= 2019 Arizona Wildcats football team =

American college football season

2019 Arizona Wildcats football
- Conference: Pac-12 Conference
- South Division
- Record: 4–8 (2–7 Pac-12)
- Head coach: Kevin Sumlin (2nd season)
- Offensive coordinator: Noel Mazzone (2nd season)
- Offensive scheme: Spread
- Defensive coordinator: Marcel Yates (4th season; first 8 games); Chuck Cecil (interim; remainder of season)
- Base defense: 4–2–5
- Captain: 4: Khalil Tate (QB); J. J. Taylor (RB); Jace Whittaker (CB); Colin Schooler (LB)
- Home stadium: Arizona Stadium

Uniform
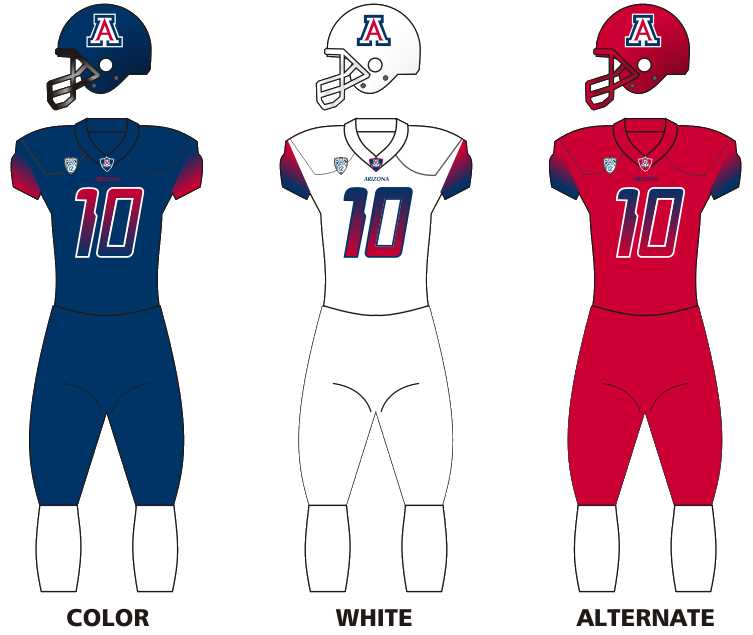

2019 Pac-12 Conference football standings
	Conf.			Overall
Team	W		L	W		L
North Division
No. 5 Oregon xy$	8	–	1	12	–	2
California	4	–	5	8	–	5
Washington	4	–	5	8	–	5
Oregon State	4	–	5	5	–	7
Washington State	3	–	6	6	–	7
Stanford	3	–	6	4	–	8
South Division
No. 16 Utah xy	8	–	1	11	–	3
USC	7	–	2	8	–	5
Arizona State	4	–	5	8	–	5
UCLA	4	–	5	4	–	8
Colorado	3	–	6	5	–	7
Arizona	2	–	7	4	–	8
Championship: Oregon 37, Utah 15
$ – Conference champion; x – Division champion/co-champions; y – Championship game participant; Rankings from AP Poll

The 2019 Arizona Wildcats football team represented the University of Arizona in the 2019 NCAA Division I FBS football season. The season marked the Wildcats' 120th season. They played their home games at Arizona Stadium in Tucson, Arizona (for the 91st year) and competed as members of the South Division (9th season) in the Pac-12 Conference (42nd overall season). They were led by second-year head coach Kevin Sumlin. They finished the season 4–8, 2–7 in Pac-12 play to finish in last place in the South Division.

Defensive coordinator Marcel Yates was fired after eight games due to a poor defensive performance by the team. He was hired to be the defensive backs coach at California in 2020.

== Offseason ==
The Wildcats have 12 senior graduates only graduated players noted until spring practice. As well as one junior who would choose to forgo their senior season in pursuit of an early NFL career. The Wildcats would lose 14 more players from the 2018 team due to various reasons. Notable departures from the 2018 squad included.

Name	Number	Pos.	Height	Weight	Year	Hometown	Notes
P. J. Johnson	#52	DT	6'4	335	RS junior	Sacramento, CA	Declared for 2019 NFL draft
Layth Friekh	#58	OL	6'5	297	RS senior	Glendale, AZ	Graduated/2019 NFL draft
Shawn Poindexter	#19	WR	6'5	218	RS senior	Peoria, AZ	Graduated/2019 NFL draft
Dylan Klumph	#42	P	6'3	229	RS senior	Malibu, CA	Graduated
Josh Pollack	#30	PK	5'10	184	RS senior	Highland Park, IL	Graduated
Jake Glatting	#18	P	6'3	221	RS senior	Phoenix, AZ	Graduated
Tim Hough	#8	CB	5'11	195	RS senior	Detroit, MI	Graduated
Dereck Boles	#99	DT	6'2	306	RS senior	Kingston, Jamaica	Graduated
Matt Thomas	#90	DT	6'1	278	RS senior	Tucson, AZ	Graduated
Nick Reinhardt	#49	LS	6'1	241	RS senior	Scottsdale, AZ	Graduated
Tony Ellison	#9	WR	5'11	189	RS senior	Granite Bay, CA	Graduated
Demetrius Flannigan-Fowles	#6	S	6'2	209	Senior	Tucson, AZ	Graduated
Shun Brown	#6	WR	5'10	188	Senior	Shreveport, LA	Graduated
Jamie Nunley	#85	TE	6'5	230	RS sophomore	Murrieta, CA	Medically retirement
Jacob Colacion	#34	LB	6'1	218	RS sophomore	La Habra, CA	Medically retirement

=== Recruiting ===
The 2019 football recruiting cycle was the first in which the NCAA authorized two signing periods for high school seniors in that sport. In addition to the traditional spring period starting with National Signing Day in February 2019, a new early signing period was introduced, with the first such period falling from December 19, 2018.

College recruiting
Name	Hometown	School	Height	Weight	Commit date
Jalen Curry; WR	Houston, TX	St. Pius X HS	6 ft 3 in (1.91 m)	197 lb (89 kg)	Dec 19, 2018
Jalen Curry; WR	Recruit ratings: Rivals: 247Sports: ESPN: (82)				
Grant Gunnell; QB	Houston, TX	St. Pius X HS	6 ft 6 in (1.98 m)	213 lb (97 kg)	Jun 6, 2018
Grant Gunnell; QB	Recruit ratings: Rivals: 247Sports: ESPN: (80)				
Bobby Wolfe; CB	Houston, TX	James Madison HS	6 ft 1 in (1.85 m)	175 lb (79 kg)	Dec 19, 2018
Bobby Wolfe; CB	Recruit ratings: Rivals: 247Sports: ESPN: (78)				
Jaden Mitchell; WR (LQ)	Las Vegas, NV	Desert Oasis HS	5 ft 11 in (1.80 m)	175 lb (79 kg)	Apr 28, 2017
Jaden Mitchell; WR (LQ)	Recruit ratings: Rivals: 247Sports: ESPN: (78)				
Jamari Williams; OG	Fort Lauderdale, FL	Cardinal Gibbons HS	6 ft 3 in (1.91 m)	295 lb (134 kg)	Nov 1, 2018
Jamari Williams; OG	Recruit ratings: Rivals: 247Sports: ESPN: (77)				
Jalen Johnson; WR	Corona, CA	Eleanor Roosevelt HS	6 ft 3 in (1.91 m)	170 lb (77 kg)	Jul 14, 2018
Jalen Johnson; WR	Recruit ratings: Rivals: 247Sports: ESPN: (77)				
Kwabena Watson; LB	Fresno, CA	Edison HS	6 ft 3 in (1.91 m)	201 lb (91 kg)	Jun 24, 2018
Kwabena Watson; LB	Recruit ratings: Rivals: 247Sports: ESPN: (77)				
Josh Donovan; OT	College Station, TX	Trinity Valley CC (JC)	6 ft 5 in (1.96 m)	325 lb (147 kg)	Nov 25, 2018
Josh Donovan; OT	Recruit ratings: Rivals: 247Sports: ESPN: (76)				
Myles Tapuosa; DT	Salt Lake City, UT	Eastern Arizona College (JC)	6 ft 2 in (1.88 m)	320 lb (150 kg)	Nov 27, 2018
Myles Tapuosa; DT	Recruit ratings: Rivals: 247Sports: ESPN: (76)				
Jaxen Turner; S	Moreno Valley, CA	Rancho Valley HS	6 ft 1 in (1.85 m)	175 lb (79 kg)	Oct 21, 2018
Jaxen Turner; S	Recruit ratings: Rivals: 247Sports: ESPN: (75)				
Kane Bradford; DT	Dallas, TX	Skyline HS	6 ft 4 in (1.93 m)	270 lb (120 kg)	Jun 24, 2018
Kane Bradford; DT	Recruit ratings: Rivals: 247Sports: ESPN: (75)				
Michael Wiley; RB	Houston, TX	Strake Jesuit College Prep	5 ft 10 in (1.78 m)	175 lb (79 kg)	May 26, 2018
Michael Wiley; RB	Recruit ratings: Rivals: 247Sports: ESPN: (75)				
Chris Roland; ATH	Palmdale, CA	William J. "Pete" Knight HS	6 ft 2 in (1.88 m)	185 lb (84 kg)	Jul 29, 2018
Chris Roland; ATH	Recruit ratings: Rivals: 247Sports: ESPN: (74)				
Eddie Siaumau; S	Pago Pago, AS	Leone High School	6 ft 1 in (1.85 m)	210 lb (95 kg)	Jul 28, 2018
Eddie Siaumau; S	Recruit ratings: Rivals: 247Sports: ESPN: (74)				
Trevon Mason; DT	Arlington, TX	Navarro College (JC)	6 ft 3 in (1.91 m)	290 lb (130 kg)	Nov 25, 2018
Trevon Mason; DT	Recruit ratings: Rivals: 247Sports: ESPN: (74)				
Derrion Clark; DE	Dallas, TX	South Oak Cliff HS	6 ft 0 in (1.83 m)	237 lb (108 kg)	Jun 23, 2018
Derrion Clark; DE	Recruit ratings: Rivals: 247Sports: ESPN: (74)				
Jordan Morgan; OT	Tucson, AZ	Marana HS	6 ft 4 in (1.93 m)	265 lb (120 kg)	Jun 14, 2018
Jordan Morgan; OT	Recruit ratings: Rivals: 247Sports: ESPN: (73)				
Kyle Ostendorp; K	Phoenix, AZ	Desert Vista HS	6 ft 1 in (1.85 m)	195 lb (88 kg)	May 21, 2018
Kyle Ostendorp; K	Recruit ratings: Rivals: 247Sports: ESPN: (72)				
Paiton Fears; OT	Hutchinson, KS	Hutchinson CC (JC)	6 ft 5 in (1.96 m)	325 lb (147 kg)	Dec 18, 2018
Paiton Fears; OT	Recruit ratings: Rivals: 247Sports: ESPN: (72)				
Kyon Barrs; DT	Murrieta, CA	Murrieta Mesa HS	6 ft 3 in (1.91 m)	285 lb (129 kg)	May 17, 2019
Kyon Barrs; DT	Recruit ratings: Rivals: 247Sports: ESPN: (72)				
Overall recruit ranking:
‡ Refers to 40-yard dash; Note: In many cases, Scout, Rivals, 247Sports, On3, and ESPN may conflict in their listings of height, weight and 40 time.; In these cases, the average was taken. ESPN grades are on a 100-point scale.; Sources: "Arizona Football Commitment List". Rivals.; "2019 Player Commitments – Arizona". ESPN.; "2019 Team Ranking". Rivals.com.; "2019 Arizona Wildcats football team". 247Sports.

=== Transfers ===
Outgoing

Name	No.	Pos.	Height	Weight	Year	Hometown	New school
Kurtis Brown	#44	DT	6'1"	291	RS-Junior	Bakersfield, CA	Fresno State Bulldogs
Nathan Eldridge	#75	OL	6'3"	292	RS-Senior	Anthem, AZ	Oregon State Beavers
Michael Eletise	#47	OL	6'3"	323	RS-Junior	Honolulu, HI	Hawaii Rainbow Warriors
K'Hari Lane	#11	QB	6'1"	222	RS-Freshman	Montezuma, GA	Hutchinson Community College
Sammy Morrison	#27	CB	5'10"	177	RS-Senior	Leesburg, VA	San Diego State Aztecs
Antonio Parks	#4	CB	5'10"	204	RS-Junior	New Orleans, LA	UTSA Roadrunners
Isaiah Hayes	#21	S	6'0	191	Junior	Los Angeles, California	Louisville Cardinals
Geno Albini	#66	LS	5'11	213	RS freshman	Austin, Texas	Texas Tech Red Raiders
Azizi Hearn	#20	CB	6'1	193	RS freshman	Oceanside, California	Wyoming Cowboys
DeVaughn Cooper	#7	WR	5'10	175	RS sophomore	Los Angeles, California	UTEP Miners
Brandon Leon	#38	RB	5'8"	213	RS-Senior	Goodyear, AZ	TBD
Thiyo Lukusa	#70	OL	6'5"	308	RS-Junior	Traverse City, MI	TBD
Anthony Mariscal	#38	RB	5'10"	212	RS-Senior	Bakersfield, CA	TBD
Sione Taufahema	#94	DT	6'1"	339	RS-Senior	Mission Hills, CA	TBD
Jailen Bailey	#83	WR	5'10"	163	Freshman	San Diego, CA	San Diego Mesa College

Incoming

Name	No.	Pos.	Height	Weight	Year	Hometown	Prev. school
Josh Donovan	#56	OT	6'5"	325	2019	College Station, TX	Trinity Valley Community College
Myles Tapusoa	#99	DT	6'2"	320	2019	Salt Lake City, UT	Eastern Arizona College
Trevon Mason	#90	DT	6'3"	290	2019	Arlington, TX	Navarro College
Paiton Fears	#74	OT	6'5"	325	2019	Hutchinson, KS	Hutchinson Community College
Zach Lord	#75	OT	6'10"	265	2019	Liberty Hill, TX	Dallas Baptist University
Samari Springs	#29	S	6'0"	189	2019	Ashburn, VA	Richmond Spiders

=== Position key ===
Back	B	Center	C	Cornerback	CB	Defensive back	DB
Defensive end	DE	Defensive lineman	DL	Defensive tackle	DT	End	E
Fullback	FB	Guard	G	Halfback	HB	Kicker	K
Kickoff returner	KR	Offensive tackle	OT	Offensive lineman	OL	Linebacker	LB
Long snapper	LS	Punter	P	Punt returner	PR	Quarterback	QB
Running back	RB	Safety	S	Tight end	TE	Wide receiver	WR

=== Returning starters ===
Offense

Player	Class	Position
Khalil Tate	Senior	Quarterback
J. J. Taylor	RS junior	Running back
Cedric Peterson	RS senior	Wide receiver
Stanley Berryhill	RS sophomore	Wide receiver
Bryce Wolma	Junior	Tight end
Cody Creason	RS senior	Offensive line
Josh McCauley	RS senior	Offensive line

Defense

Player	Class	Position
J.B. Brown	Junior	Defensive end
Kylan Wilborn	Junior	Linebacker
Tony Fields II	Junior	Linebacker
Colin Schooler	Junior	Linebacker
Jace Whittaker	RS senior	Defensive back
Lorenzo Burns	RS junior	Defensive back
Jarrius Wallace	RS junior	Defensive back
Tristan Cooper	Senior	Defensive back

Special teams

Player	Class	Position
Lucas Havrisik	Junior	Placekicker
Cedric Peterson	RS senior	Kick returner

† Indicates player was a starter in 2018 but missed all of 2019 due to injury.

=== Spring game ===
The 2019 Wildcats had spring practice in March 2019. The 2019 Arizona football spring game took place in Tucson, AZ on April 13, 2019, at 6:00 pm MT with the Defense team beating the Offense team 87–30.

== Preseason ==
=== Award watch lists ===
Listed in the order that they were released

Award	Player	Position	Year
Lott Trophy	Colin Schooler	LB	JR
Maxwell Award	Khalil Tate	QB	SR
Maxwell Award	J. J. Taylor	RB	RS JR
Bednarik Award	Colin Schooler	LB	JR
Davey O'Brien Award	Khalil Tate	QB	SR
Doak Walker Award	J. J. Taylor	RB	RS JR
John Mackey Award	Bryce Wolma	TE	JR
Rimington Trophy	Josh McCauley	C	RS SR
Butkus Award	Tony Fields II	LB	JR
Butkus Award	Colin Schooler	LB	JR
Bronko Nagurski Trophy	Colin Schooler	LB	JR
Wuerffel Trophy	Malcolm Holland	CB	RS JR
Polynesian College Football Player Of The Year Award	Donovan Laie	OL	SO
Johnny Unitas Golden Arm Award	Khalil Tate	QB	SR
Manning Award	Khalil Tate	QB	SR

=== Pac-12 Media Day ===
The 2019 Pac-12 Media Day was held on July 24, 2019, in Hollywood, California. Arizona head coach Kevin Sumlin, quarterback Khalil Tate, and running back J. J. Taylor were in attendance to field questions from the media.

In the 2019 Pac-12 preseason media poll, Arizona was voted to finish in fifth place in the South Division.

=== Preseason All-Pac-12 teams ===
The Wildcats had 2 players at 2 positions selected to the preseason All-Pac-12 teams.

Offense

2nd team

J. J. Taylor – RB

Defense

1st team

Colin Schooler – LB

Specialists

1st team

J. J. Taylor – RET

== Personnel ==
=== Coaching staff ===
Name	Position	Year at Arizona	Alma mater
Kevin Sumlin	Head coach	2nd	Purdue
Noel Mazzone	Offensive coordinator/quarterbacks	2nd	New Mexico
Chuck Cecil	Defensive coordinator/safeties	1st	Arizona
Taylor Mazzone	Assistant coach/outside Receivers	2nd	East Carolina
Greg Patrick	Assistant coach/defensive backs/Line	1st	
Kyle DeVan	Assistant coach/offensive line	1st	Oregon State
Hank Hobson	Assistant coach/linebackers	1st	Arizona
DeMarco Murray	Assistant coach/running backs	1st	Oklahoma
Theron Aych	Assistant coach/inside wide receivers	3rd	Northern State
Jeremy Springer	Tight ends/Special teams	2nd	UTEP
Brian Johnson	Strength and Conditioning	2nd	LSU

=== Roster ===
2019 Arizona Wildcats Football
Quarterbacks: 4 Rhett Rodriguez – junior (6'0, 186); 12 Kevin Doyle – sophomore (6'3, 210); 13 Luke Ashworth – sophomore (6'0, 197); 14 Khalil Tate – senior (6'2, 215); 15 Cameron Fietz – (redshirt) freshman (6'1, 192); 17 Grant Gunnell – freshman (6'5, 222); Running backs: 6 Michael Wiley – freshman (5'11, 186); 20 Darrius Smith – (redshirt) freshman (5'9, 175); 21 J. J. Taylor – (redshirt) junior (5'6, 180); 23 Gary Brightwell – junior (6'1, 196); 28 Nazar Bombata – sophomore (5'11, 195); 33 Nathan Tilford – (redshirt) sophomore (6'2, 206); 34 John Burton – freshman (5'11, 210); 36 Bryce Coleman – (redshirt) junior (5'9, 185); Wide receiver: 1 Drew Dixon – (redshirt) sophomore (6'3, 203); 4 Boobie Curry – freshman (6'2, 206); 5 Brian Casteel – junior (6'0, 214); 7 Jaden Mitchell – freshman (5'9, 175); 8 Thomas Aych – (redshirt) sophomore (6'0, 167); 9 Jalen Johnson – freshman (6'2, 199); 10 Jamarye Joiner – (redshirt) freshman (6'1, 210); 11 Tayvian Cunningham – junior (5'7, 181); 15 William Gunnell – (redshirt) freshman (5'9, 187); 16 Thomas Reid III – (redshirt) junior (6'2, 202); 18 Cedric Peterson – (redshirt) senior (5'11, 188) (KR+); 25 Devin Green – freshman (5'10, 166); 35 Karl Altenburg – (redshirt) sophomore (5'9, 180); 40 Jashon Butler – (redshirt) freshman (5'8, 182); 41 Daniel Egbo – senior (6'2, 192); 82 Zach Williams – (redshirt) freshman (6'3, 224); 83 Terrence Johnson – (redshirt) senior (6'2, 211); 86 Stanley Berryhill – (redshirt) sophomore (5'9, 169); 88 Vince Ellison – freshman (6'2, 170); 89 Brice Vooletich – (redshirt) freshman (5'10, 194); Tight end: 39 Tristen D'Angelo – Sophomore (6'3, 203); 42 Connor Hutchings – junior (6'5, 220) (OL+); 46 Jack Koceman – (redshirt) freshman (6'4, 235); 80 Jake Peters – (redshirt) freshman (6'4, 235); 81 Bryce Wolma – junior (6'3, 239); Punter: 19 Kyle Ostendorp – freshman (6'1, 202); 26 Matt Aragon – (redshirt) senior (6'5, 211); 32 Jacob Meeker-Hackett - (redshirt) Junior (6'0, 199) (WR+); 99 Cameron Weinberg – freshman (5'11, 177) (K+)	Offensive lineman: 50 Josh McCauley – (redshirt) junior (6'3, 292) (OL+); 53 Jon Jacobs – (redshirt) junior (6'4, 300) (OL+); 54 Bryson Cain – (redshirt) junior (6'4, 291) (OT+); 55 Jamari Williams – freshman (6'3, 298) (OL+); 56 Josh Donovan – junior (6'5, 317) (OL+); 60 Mykee Irving – (redshirt) freshman (6'3, 337) (OL+); 63 Steven Bailey – senior (6'3, 318) (OL+); 66 Robert Congel – (redshirt) sophomore (6'3, 315) (OL+); 67 David Watson – sophomore (6'3, 307) (OL+); 72 Edgar Burrola – (redshirt) sophomore (6'5, 293) (OL+); 74 Paiton Fears – junior (6'5, 308) (OL+); 75 Zach Lord – junior (6'7, 275) (OT+); 76 Cody Creason – (redshirt) senior (6'4, 294) (OT+); 77 Jordan Morgan – freshman (6'5, 287); 78 Donovan Laie – sophomore (6'4, 318) (OL+); 79 Tyson Gardner – (redshirt) sophomore (6'3, 277) (OL+); Defensive lineman: 12 JB Brown – junior (6'3, 244) (DE+); 19 Kwabena Watson – freshman (6'2, 210) (DE+); 40 Dante Diaz–Infante – junior (6'1, 250) (DE+); 45 Issaiah Johnson – sophomore (6'1, 235) (DL+); 55 Chandler Kelly – freshman (6'2, 209) (DL+); 58 Nahe Sulunga – (redshirt) freshman (6'2, 270) (DT+); 81 Jalen Cochran – (redshirt) junior (6'3, 249) (DE+); 86 Justin Belknap – (redshirt) senior (DE+); 90 Trevon Mason – junior (6'4, 285) (DL+); 91 Finton Connolly – (redshirt) senior (6'5, 275) (DT+); 92 Kyon Barrs – freshman (6'2, 299) (DT+); 94 Naz Higgins – freshman (6'3, 272) (DT+); 99 Myles Tapousa – junior (6'1, 330) (DL+); Linebackers: 1 Tony Fields II – junior (6'1, 225); 7 Colin Schooler – junior (6'0, 226); 8 Anthony Pandy – junior (6'0, 225); 9 Dayven Coleman – sophomore (6'2, 216); 14 Kylan Wilborn – junior (6'2, 245) (STUD+); 26 Eddie Siaumau – freshman (6'3, 235); 27 Derrion Clark – freshman (6'1, 211); 38 Dante Smith – sophomore (5'10, 223); 44 Calib McRae – freshman (6'1, 246); 48 Parker Henley – (redshirt) sophomore (5'11, 222); 49 Jalen Harris – (redshirt) sophomore (6'4, 212) (STUD+); 51 Lee Anderson III – senior (6'1, 235) (STUD+); 53 Richard Merritt – (redshirt) junior (6'0, 216); 56 Rexx Tessler – (redshirt) sophomore (5'9, 209); Placekicker: 43 Lucas Havrisik – junior (6'2, 173); 80 Nathan Halsell – freshman (6'1, 201)	Defensive backs: 2 Lorenzo Burns – (redshirt) junior (5'10, 173) (CB+); 3 Jarrius Wallace – (redshirt) junior (6'1, 180) (S+); 4 Christian Roland-Wallace – freshman (5'11, 198) (CB+); 5 Christian Young – sophomore (6'1, 209) (S+); 6 Scottie Young Jr. – junior (5'11, 200) (S+); 10 Malcolm Holland – (redshirt) senior (5'11, 189) (CB+); 11 Troy Young – junior (6'0, 205) (S+); 13 Chacho Ulloa – senior (5'11, 192) (S+); 15 McKenzie Barnes – sophomore (6'1, 178) (CB+); 17 Jace Whittaker – (redshirt) senior (5'11, 182) (CB+); 18 Dhameer Warren – freshman (6'1, 175) (CB+); 21 Jaxen Turner – freshman (6'0, 190) (CB+); 23 Malik Hausman – (redshirt) sophomore (6'0, 170) (CB+); 24 Rhedi Short – (redshirt) sophomore (6'0, 184) (S+); 25 Bobby Wolfe – freshman (6'1, 170) (CB+); 29 Samari Springs – junior (6'0, 189) (S+); 30 Quinn Sullivan – freshman (5'11, 181) (S+); 31 Tristan Cooper – senior (6'1, 188) (S+); 32 Blake Washington – freshman (5'9, 182) (S+); 33 Blake Pfaff – (redshirt) sophomore (5'11, 182) (S+); 37 Xavier Bell – (redshirt) sophomore (6'2, 192) (S+); 47 Rourke Freeburg – (redshirt) sophomore (6'2, 200) (S+); Long snapper: 51 Donald Reiter – (redshirt) junior (5'10, 235); 61 Seth Mackellar – freshman (5'11, 195)
Source and player details:

=== Depth chart ===
Starters and backups.

Defense

FS
Scottie Young Jr.
Jarrius Wallace
-

WLB	SLB
Tony Fields II	Colin Schooler
Anthony Pandy	Dayven Coleman
–	-

SS
Tristian Cooper
Xavier Bell
Jaxen Turner

CB
Jace Whittaker
Christian Roland-Wallace
-

OLB	DT	NT	DT	DE
Jalen Harris	Trevon Mason	Myles Tapusoa	Isaiah Johnson	JB Brown
Justin Belknap	Mykee Irving	Finton Connolly	Nahe Sulunga	Kylan Wilborn
–	-	-	-	-

CB
Lorenzo Burns
Samari Springs
–

Offense

WR
Drew Dixon
or
Jalen Curry
Tre Adams
–

WR
Cedric Peterson
Stanley Berryhill
Thomas Reid III

LT	LG	C	RG	RT
Donovan Laie	Robert Congel	Josh McCauley	Cody Creason	Edgar Burrola or Paiton Fears
Jordan Morgan	Josh Donovan	Steven Bailey	Bryson Cain	–
–	–	–	–	–

TE
Bryce Wolma
Zach Williams
–

WR
Brian Casteel
or
Jamarye Joiner
Tayvian Cunningham
Jaden Mitchell

QB
Khalil Tate
Rhett Rodriguez
Grant Gunnell

Key reserves
Offense
Defense
Out (Suspension)
Out (season)
Out (Mission)
Out (Transfer)

RB
J. J. Taylor
Gary Brightwell
Darrius Smith
Nathan Tilford
or
Michael Wiley

Special teams
PK Lucas Havrisik
PK Nathan Halsell
P Matt Aragon
P Kyle Ostendorp
KR J. J. Taylor
Gary Brightwell
Jamarye Joiner
Christian Roland-Wallace
PR Brian Casteel
or
Stanley Berryhill
LS Donald Reiter
Seth MacKeller
H Matt Aragon
Rhett Rodriguez

Depth Chart Source: 2019 Arizona Wildcats Football Fact Book

True Freshman
Double Position : *

== Schedule ==
Arizona announced its 2019 football schedule on December 4, 2018. The 2019 Wildcats' schedule consisted of 6 home and 6 away games for the regular season. Arizona host 4 Pac-12 opponents Oregon State, UCLA, Utah and Washington, host 5 Pac-12 opponents on the road to arch-rival Arizona State for the 92nd annual Territorial Cup to close out the regular season, Colorado, Oregon, Stanford and USC. Arizona is not scheduled to play Pac-12 North opponents California and Washington State for the 2019 Pac-12 regular season. The Wildcats had 3 bye weeks coming during Week 1 (on August 31), Week 4 (on September 21) and Week 11 (on November 9).

Arizona's out of conference opponents represent the Big Sky, Big 12 and Mountain West conferences. The Wildcats would host two non–conference games which are against Northern Arizona from the (Big Sky) and Texas Tech (Big 12) and traveled to Hawaii from the (Mountain West).

Date	Time	Opponent	Site	TV	Result	Attendance
August 24	7:30 p.m.	at Hawaii*	Aloha Stadium; Halawa, HI	CBSSN	L 38–45	22,396
September 7	7:45 p.m.	Northern Arizona*	Arizona Stadium; Tucson, AZ	P12N	W 65–41	40,741
September 14	7:30 p.m.	Texas Tech*	Arizona Stadium; Tucson, AZ	ESPN	W 28–14	37,307
September 28	7:30 p.m.	UCLA	Arizona Stadium; Tucson, AZ	ESPN	W 20–17	38,283
October 5	1:30 p.m.	at Colorado	Folsom Field; Boulder, CO	P12N	W 35–30	52,569
October 12	8:00 p.m.	Washington	Arizona Stadium; Tucson, AZ	FS1	L 27–51	47,933
October 19	6:30 p.m.	at USC	Los Angeles Memorial Coliseum; Los Angeles, CA	P12N	L 14–41	53,826
October 26	12:30 p.m.	at Stanford	Stanford Stadium; Stanford, CA	P12N	L 31–41	31,711
November 2	1:30 p.m.	Oregon State^{†}	Arizona Stadium; Tucson, AZ	P12N	L 38–56	36,939
November 16	8:30 p.m.	at No. 6 Oregon	Autzen Stadium; Eugene, OR	ESPN	L 6–34	54,219
November 23	8:00 p.m.	No. 7 Utah	Arizona Stadium; Tucson, AZ	FS1	L 7–35	35,991
November 30	8:00 p.m.	at Arizona State	Sun Devil Stadium; Tempe, AZ (rivalry)	ESPN	L 14–24	54,074
*Non-conference game; ^{†}Homecoming; Rankings from AP Poll released prior to the game; All times are in Mountain time

== Game summaries ==
=== at Hawaii ===
Arizona Wildcats (0–0) at Hawaii Rainbow Warriors (0–0) – Game summary

Quarter	1	2	3	4	Total
Wildcats	0	21	14	3	38
Rainbow Warriors	14	14	7	10	45

at Aloha Stadium • Honolulu, HI

- Date: August 24, 2019
- Game time: 7:30 P.M.
- Game weather: Mostly sunny, humid, 88 °F (31 °C)
- Game attendance: 22,396
- Referee: Brandon Cruse
- TV announcers (CBS Sports Network): Carter Blackburn (play-by-play), Aaron Taylor (analyst), Rick Neuheisel (analyst), Jenny Dell (sideline reporter)

Game information

First quarter

- (9:22) HAW – Cedric Byrd II 7-yard pass from Cole McDonald, Ryan Meskell kick (Drive: 7 plays, 51 yards, 2:51; Hawaii 7–0)
- (4:54) HAW – JoJo Ward 39-yard pass from Cole McDonald, Ryan Meskell kick (Drive: 5 plays, 62 yards, 3:12; Hawaii 14–0)

Second quarter

- (14:23) ARIZ – Bryce Wolma 14-yard pass from Khalil Tate, Lucas Havrisik kick (Drive: 7 plays, 49 yards, 2:00; Hawaii 14–7)
- (9:50) HAW – Cedric Byrd II 25-yard pass from Cole McDonald, Ryan Meskell kick (Drive: 10 plays, 75 yards, 4:33; Hawaii 21–7)
- (8:00) ARIZ – Nathan Tilford 1-yard run, Lucas Havrisik kick (Drive: 6 plays, 77 yards, 1:45; Hawaii 21–14)
- (1:47) ARIZ – Jamarye Joiner 27-yard pass from Khalil Tate, Lucas Havrisik kick (Drive: 4 plays, 76 yards, 1:01; Tied 21–21)
- (0:28) HAW – Cedric Byrd II 35-yard pass from Cole McDonald, Ryan Meskell kick (Drive: 4 plays, 75 yards, 1:19; Hawaii 28–21)

Third quarter

- (11:02) HAW – Dayton Furuta 3-yard run, Ryan Meskell kick (Drive: 4 plays, 78 yards, 1:42; Hawaii 35–21)
- (4:23) ARIZ – J.J. Taylor 24-yard run, Lucas Havrisik kick (Drive: 8 plays, 68 yards, 2:36; Hawaii 35–28)
- (0:51) ARIZ – Stanley Berryhill III 21-yard pass from Khalil Tate, Lucas Havrisik kick (Drive: 4 plays, 52 yards, 1:42; Tied 35–35)

Fourth quarter

- (10:39) HAW – Ryan Meskell 34-yard field goal (Drive: 10 plays, 51 yards, 5:05; Hawaii 38–35)
- (5:02) HAW – Cedric Byrd II 30-yard pass from Chevan Cordeiro, Ryan Meskell kick (Drive: 4 plays, 48 yards, 2:30; Hawaii 45–35)
- (3:53) ARIZ – Lucas Havrisik 53-yard field goal (Drive: 5 plays, 40 yards, 1:09; Hawaii 45–38)

Statistics	ARIZ	HAW
First downs	27	31
Total yards	539	595
Rushing yards	32–178	30–159
Passing yards	361	436
Passing: Comp–Att–Int	22–39–2	34–48–4
Time of possession	22:04	37:56

Team	Category	Player	Statistics
Arizona	Passing	Khalil Tate	22/39, 361 yards, 3 TD, 2 INT
Arizona	Rushing	Khalil Tate	13 carries, 108 yards
Arizona	Receiving	Stanley Berryhill III	3 receptions, 92 yards, TD
Hawaii	Passing	Cole McDonald	29/41, 378 yards, 4 TD, 4 INT
Hawaii	Rushing	Dayton Furuta	5 carries, 42 yards, TD
Hawaii	Receiving	Cedric Byrd II	14 receptions, 224 yards, 4 TD

=== vs Northern Arizona ===
Northern Arizona Lumberjacks (1–0) vs Arizona Wildcats (0–1) – Game summary

Quarter	1	2	3	4	Total
Lumberjacks	7	6	14	14	41
Wildcats	21	30	7	7	65

at Arizona Stadium • Tucson, AZ

- Date: September 7, 2019
- Game time: 7:45 P.M.
- Game weather: Partly cloudy, 88 °F (31 °C)
- Game attendance: 40,741
- Referee: Chris Coyte
- TV announcers (Pac-12 Network): Guy Haberman (play-by-play), Lincoln Kennedy (analyst), Cindy Brunson (sideline reporter)

Game information

First quarter

- (13:29) ARIZ – Tayvian Cunningham 47-yard pass from Khalil Tate, Lucas Havrisik kick (Drive: 5 plays, 77 yards, 1:31; Arizona 7–0)
- (11:00) ARIZ – J.J. Taylor 25-yard run, Lucas Havrisik kick (Drive: 3 plays, 65 yards, 1:01; Arizona 14–0)
- (7:22) ARIZ – Gary Brightwell 94-yard run, Lucas Havrisik kick (Drive: 2 plays, 92 yards, 0:51; Arizona 21–0)
- (4:45) NAU – Stacy Chukwumezie 24-yard pass from Case Cookus, Luis Aguilar kick (Drive: 8 plays, 75 yards, 2:37; Arizona 21–7)

Second quarter

- (12:27) ARIZ – Khalil Tate 1-yard run, Lucas Havrisik kick (Drive: 16 plays, 80 yards, 7:11; Arizona 28–7)
- (9:42) ARIZ – Tayvian Cunningham 8-yard pass from Khalil Tate, Lucas Havrisik kick (Drive: 4 plays, 31 yards, 1:33; Arizona 35–7)
- (7:56) NAU – Luis Aguilar 34-yard field goal (Drive: 7 plays, 67 yards, 1:41; Arizona 35–10)
- (4:18) ARIZ – Drew Dixon 9-yard pass from Grant Gunnell, Lucas Havrisik kick (Drive: 10 plays, 75 yards, 3:38; Arizona 42–10)
- (3:28) ARIZ – Team safety (Arizona 44–10)
- (1:41) ARIZ – Thomas Reid III 75-yard pass from Grant Gunnell, Lucas Havrisik kick (Drive: 4 plays, 87 yards, 1:40; Arizona 51–10)
- (0:00) NAU – Luis Aguilar 43-yard field goal (Drive: 8 plays, 49 yards, 0:04; Arizona 51–13)

Third quarter

- (9:08) NAU – Jacob Mpungi 2-yard run, Luis Aguilar kick (Drive: 13 plays, 75 yards, 5:52; Arizona 51–20)
- (6:05) ARIZ – Darrius Smith 47-yard run, Lucas Havrisik kick (Drive: 3 plays, 91 yards, 1:14; Arizona 58–20)
- (3:20) NAU – Nate Stinson 7-yard run, Luis Aguilar kick (Drive: 7 plays, 75 yards, 2:45; Arizona 58–27)

Fourth quarter

- (10:30) ARIZ – Darrius Smith 1-yard pass from Grant Gunnell, Lucas Havrisik kick (Drive: 16 plays, 75 yards, 7:50; Arizona 65–27)
- (7:12) NAU – Terrell Hayward 6-yard pass from Case Cookus, Luis Aguilar kick (Drive: 8 plays, 75 yards, 3:18; Arizona 65–34)
- (3:19) NAU – George Romero 23-yard run, Luis Aguilar kick (Drive: 4 plays, 71 yards, 1:26; Arizona 65–41)

Statistics	NAU	ARIZ
First downs	26	27
Total yards	442	720
Rushing yards	27–69	46–431
Passing yards	373	289
Passing: Comp–Att–Int	28–48–2	23–28–0
Time of possession	26:21	33:39

Team	Category	Player	Statistics
Northern Arizona	Passing	Case Cookus	28/48, 373 yards, 2 TD, 2 INT
Northern Arizona	Rushing	George Romero	4 carries, 40 yards, TD
Northern Arizona	Receiving	Hendrix Johnson	7 receptions, 97 yards
Arizona	Passing	Grant Gunnell	9/11, 151 yards, 3 TD
Arizona	Rushing	Gary Brightwell	5 carries, 141 yards, TD
Arizona	Receiving	Thomas Reid III	1 reception, 75 yards, TD

=== vs Texas Tech ===
Texas Tech Red Raiders (2–0) vs Arizona Wildcats (1–1) – Game summary

Quarter	1	2	3	4	Total
Red Raiders	7	0	7	0	14
Wildcats	0	13	0	15	28

at Arizona Stadium • Tucson, AZ

- Date: September 14, 2019
- Game time: 7:30 P.M.
- Game weather: Partly cloudy, 80 °F (27 °C)
- Game attendance: 37,307
- Referee: Mike Defee
- TV announcers (ESPN): Jason Benetti (play-by-play), Rod Gilmore (analyst), Quint Kessenich (sideline reporter)

Game information

First quarter

- (0:49) TTU – SaRodorick Thompson 1-yard run, Trey Wolff kick (Drive: 6 plays, 51 yards, 1:30; Texas Tech 7–0)

Second quarter

- (13:37) ARIZ – Stanley Berryhill III 12-yard pass from Khalil Tate, Lucas Havrisik kick (Drive: 7 plays, 75 yards, 2:12; Tied 7–7)
- (8:35) ARIZ – Khalil Tate 84-yard run, kick failed (Drive: 3 plays, 87 yards, 0:57; Arizona 13–7)

Third quarter

- (6:08) TTU – McLane Mannix 8-yard pass from Alan Bowman, Trey Wolff kick (Drive: 7 plays, 86 yards, 2:42; Texas Tech 14–13)

Fourth quarter

- (14:57) ARIZ – Gary Brightwell 1-yard run, Lucas Havrisik kick (Drive: 14 plays, 87 yards, 6:11; Arizona 20–14)
- (4:05) ARIZ – Gary Brightwell 1-yard run, Khalil Tate two-point pass to Jamarye Joiner (Drive: 13 plays, 99 yards, 7:10; Arizona 28–14)

Statistics	TTU	ARIZ
First downs	22	23
Total yards	411	499
Rushing yards	25–104	61–314
Passing yards	307	185
Passing: Comp–Att–Int	30–55–2	14–23–2
Time of possession	25:08	34:52

Team	Category	Player	Statistics
Texas Tech	Passing	Alan Bowman	30/55, 307 yards, TD, 2 INT
Texas Tech	Rushing	Armand Shyne	13 carries, 68 yards
Texas Tech	Receiving	T.J. Vasher	6 receptions, 96 yards
Arizona	Passing	Khalil Tate	14/23, 185 yards, TD, 2 INT
Arizona	Rushing	Khalil Tate	17 carries, 129 yards, TD
Arizona	Receiving	Cedric Peterson	1 reception, 47 yards

=== vs UCLA ===
UCLA Bruins (1–3) vs Arizona Wildcats (2–1) – Game summary

Quarter	1	2	3	4	Total
Bruins	7	0	10	0	17
Wildcats	0	6	7	7	20

at Arizona Stadium • Tucson, AZ

- Date: September 28, 2019
- Game time: 7:30 P.M.
- Game weather: Mostly clear, 82 °F (28 °C)
- Game attendance: 38,283
- Referee: Steve Strimling
- TV announcers (ESPN): Beth Mowins (play-by-play), Anthony Becht (analyst), Rocky Boiman (sideline reporter)

Game information

First quarter

- (8:33) UCLA – Matt Lynch 2-yard pass from Dorian Thompson-Robinson, JJ Molson kick (Drive: 12 plays, 85 yards, 4:45; UCLA 7–0)

Second quarter

- (8:00) ARIZ – Lucas Havrisik 40-yard field goal (Drive: 9 plays, 33 yards, 3:31; UCLA 7–3)
- (3:14) ARIZ – Lucas Havrisik 41-yard field goal (Drive: 11 plays, 47 yards, 3:10; UCLA 7–6)

Third quarter

- (8:28) UCLA – JJ Molson 37-yard field goal (Drive: 17 plays, 56 yards, 6:32; UCLA 10–6)
- (8:17) ARIZ – Darrius Smith 75-yard pass from Grant Gunnell, Lucas Havrisik kick (Drive: 1 play, 75 yards, 0:11; Arizona 13–10)
- (0:02) UCLA – Joshua Kelley 3-yard run, JJ Molson kick (Drive: 9 plays, 80 yards, 3:36; UCLA 17–13)

Fourth quarter

- (10:51) ARIZ – Gary Brightwell 10-yard run, Lucas Havrisik kick (Drive: 10 plays, 75 yards, 4:11; Arizona 20–17)

Statistics	UCLA	ARIZ
First downs	25	21
Total yards	445	451
Rushing yards	43–217	30–99
Passing yards	228	352
Passing: Comp–Att–Int	22–42–1	29–44–0
Time of possession	31:56	28:04

Team	Category	Player	Statistics
UCLA	Passing	Dorian Thompson-Robinson	17/33, 180 yards, TD, INT
UCLA	Rushing	Joshua Kelley	27 carries, 127 yards. TD
UCLA	Receiving	Kyle Phillips	6 receptions, 63 yards
Arizona	Passing	Grant Gunnell	29/44, 352 yards, TD
Arizona	Rushing	Darrius Smith	6 carries, 35 yards
Arizona	Receiving	Darrius Smith	5 receptions, 99 yards, TD

=== at Colorado ===
Arizona Wildcats (3–1) at Colorado Buffaloes (3–1) – Game summary

Quarter	1	2	3	4	Total
Wildcats	7	7	14	7	35
Buffaloes	3	17	7	3	30

at Folsom Field • Boulder, CO

- Date: October 5, 2019
- Game time: 1:30 P.M.
- Game weather: Mostly sunny, 63 °F (17 °C)
- Game attendance: 52,569
- Referee: Matt Richards
- TV announcers (Pac-12 Network): Ted Robinson (play-by-play), Yogi Roth (analyst), Samantha Peszek (sideline reporter)

Game information

First quarter

- (9:02) COLO – James Stefanou 37-yard field goal (Drive: 13 plays, 55 yards, 5:58; Colorado 3–0)
- (0:15) ARIZ – Stanley Berryhill III 7-yard pass from Khalil Tate, Lucas Havrisik kick (Drive: 8 plays, 90 yards, 3:11; Arizona 7–3)

Second quarter

- (2:37) COLO – James Stefanou 39-yard field goal (Drive: 6 plays, 27 yards, 2:26; Arizona 7–6)
- (1:50) COLO – Dimitri Stanley 38-yard pass from K.D. Nixon, James Stefanou kick (Drive: 1 play, 38 yards, 0:09; Colorado 13–7)
- (1:40) ARIZ – Cedric Peterson 75-yard pass from Khalil Tate, Lucas Havrisik kick (Drive: 1 play, 75 yards, 0:10; Arizona 14–13)
- (0:03) COLO – Brady Russell 12-yard pass from Steven Montez, James Stefanou kick (Drive: 9 plays, 75 yards, 1:37; Colorado 20–14)

Third quarter

- (13:11) ARIZ – Brian Casteel 33-yard pass from Khalil Tate, Lucas Havrisik kick (Drive: 6 plays, 65 yards, 1:49; Arizona 21–20)
- (5:11) COLO – Tony Brown 15-yard run, James Stefanou kick (Drive: 4 plays, 68 yards, 1:11; Colorado 27–21)
- (3:42) ARIZ – Nathan Tilford 5-yard run, Lucas Havrisik kick (Drive: 6 plays, 85 yards, 1:29; Arizona 28–27)

Fourth quarter

- (11:29) COLO – James Stefanou 20-yard field goal (Drive: 14 plays, 72 yards, 7:13; Colorado 30–28)
- (6:51) ARIZ – Nathan Tilford 5-yard run, Lucas Havrisik kick (Drive: 13 plays, 77 yards, 4:32; Arizona 35–30)

Statistics	ARIZ	COLO
First downs	22	26
Total yards	487	496
Rushing yards	26–83	37–159
Passing yards	404	337
Passing: Comp–Att–Int	31–41–1	29–44–0
Time of possession	24:57	35:03

Team	Category	Player	Statistics
Arizona	Passing	Khalil Tate	31/41, 404 yards, 3 TD, INT
Arizona	Rushing	Gary Brightwell	11 carries, 27 yards
Arizona	Receiving	Cedric Peterson	3 receptions, 99 yards, TD
Colorado	Passing	Steven Montez	28/42, 299 yards, TD
Colorado	Rushing	Alex Fontenot	21 carries, 94 yards
Colorado	Receiving	Tony Brown	10 receptions, 141 yards

=== vs Washington ===
Washington Huskies (4–2) vs Arizona Wildcats (4–1) – Game summary

Quarter	1	2	3	4	Total
Huskies	6	7	14	24	51
Wildcats	0	17	0	10	27

at Arizona Stadium • Tucson, AZ

- Date: October 12, 2019
- Game time: 8:00 P.M.
- Game weather: Clear, 77 °F (25 °C)
- Game attendance: 47,933
- Referee: Mike McCabe
- TV announcers (FS1): Tim Brando (play-by-play), Spencer Tillman (analyst), Coley Harvey (sideline reporter)

Game information

First quarter

- (5:43) WASH – Peyton Henry 27-yard field goal (Drive: 8 plays, 62 yards, 3:36; Washington 3–0)
- (0:35) WASH – Peyton Henry 25-yard field goal (Drive: 4 plays, 0 yards, 1:47; Washington 6–0)

Second quarter

- (12:59) ARIZ – Lucas Havrisik 50-yard field goal (Drive: 4 plays, 8 yards, 1:15; Washington 6–3)
- (8:55) WASH – Brandon Wellington 5-yard fumble return, Peyton Henry kick (Washington 13–3)
- (5:31) ARIZ – Jamarye Joiner 40-yard pass from Khalil Tate, Lucas Havrisik kick (Drive: 9 plays, 75 yards, 3:24; Washington 13–10)
- (1:06) ARIZ – J.J. Taylor 1-yard run, Lucas Havrisik kick (Drive: 9 plays, 68 yards, 2:47; Arizona 17–13)

Third quarter

- (10:40) WASH – Jack Westover 3-yard pass from Jacob Eason, Peyton Henry kick (Drive: 10 plays, 75 yards, 4:20; Washington 20–17)
- (2:41) WASH – Salvon Ahmed 4-yard run, Peyton Henry kick (Drive: 6 plays, 36 yards, 3:02; Washington 27–17)

Fourth quarter

- (14:46) ARIZ – Lucas Havrisik 31-yard field goal (Drive: 9 plays, 62 yards, 2:55; Washington 27–20)
- (13:07) WASH – Aaron Fuller 22-yard pass from Jacob Eason, Peyton Henry kick (Drive: 4 plays, 75 yards, 1:39; Washington 34–20)
- (9:54) WASH – Salvon Ahmed 3-yard run, Peyton Henry kick (Drive: 5 plays, 63 yards, 2:15; Washington 41–20)
- (6:59) WASH – Peyton Henry 27-yard field goal (Drive: 5 plays, 20 yards, 2:48; Washington 44–20)
- (4:25) ARIZ – Nathan Tilford 25-yard run, Lucas Havrisik kick (Drive: 9 plays, 79 yards, 2:28; Washington 44–27)
- (2:12) WASH – Salvon Ahmed 10-yard run, Peyton Henry kick (Drive: 4 plays, 43 yards, 2:11; Washington 51–27)

Statistics	WASH	ARIZ
First downs	18	18
Total yards	450	360
Rushing yards	45–207	39–151
Passing yards	243	209
Passing: Comp–Att–Int	15–22–0	16–33–1
Time of possession	34:24	25:36

Team	Category	Player	Statistics
Washington	Passing	Jacob Eason	15/22, 243 yards, 2 TD
Washington	Rushing	Sean McGrew	13 carries, 106 yards
Washington	Receiving	Puka Nacua	3 receptions, 97 yards
Arizona	Passing	Khalil Tate	13/25, 184 yards, TD, INT
Arizona	Rushing	J.J. Taylor	18 carries, 89 yards, TD
Arizona	Receiving	Cedric Peterson	3 receptions, 64 yards

=== at USC ===
Arizona Wildcats (4–2) at USC Trojans (3–3) – Game summary

Quarter	1	2	3	4	Total
Wildcats	0	0	0	14	14
Trojans	10	7	10	14	41

at Los Angeles Memorial Coliseum • Los Angeles, CA

- Date: October 19, 2019
- Game time: 6:30 P.M.
- Game weather: Clear LA skies, 69 °F (21 °C)
- Game attendance: 53,826
- Referee: Kevin Mar
- TV announcers (Pac-12 Network): Roxy Bernstein (play by play), Anthony Herron (analyst), Jill Savage (sideline reporter)

Game information

First quarter

- (8:02) USC – Chase McGrath 31-yard field goal (Drive: 4 plays, 8 yards, 1:22; USC 3–0)
- (0:23) USC – Michael Pittman Jr. 9-yard pass from Kedon Slovis, Chase McGrath kick (Drive: 5 plays, 34 yards, 2:19; USC 10–0)

Second quarter

- (1:07) USC – Markese Stepp 12-yard run, Chase McGrath kick (Drive: 10 plays, 87 yards, 5:09; USC 17–0)

Third quarter

- (8:28) USC – Chase McGrath 38-yard field goal (Drive: 4 plays, 9 yards, 1:19; USC 20–0)
- (3:29) USC – Tyler Vaughns 5-yard pass from Kedon Slovis, Chase McGrath kick (Drive: 4 plays, 60 yards, 1:17; USC 27–0)

Fourth quarter

- (13:13) USC – Kenan Christon 55-yard run, Chase McGrath kick (Drive: 3 plays, 68 yards, 1:07; USC 34–0)
- (12:12) ARIZ – Brian Casteel 56-yard pass from Grant Gunnell, Lucas Havrisik kick (Drive: 3 plays, 70 yards, 0:55; USC 34–7)
- (8:20) USC – Kenan Christon 30-yard run, Chase McGrath kick (Drive: 7 plays, 75 yards, 3:52; USC 41–7)
- (0:28) ARIZ – Brian Casteel 27-yard pass from Grant Gunnell, Lucas Havrisik kick (Drive: 7 plays, 98 yards, 1:48; USC 41–14)

Statistics	ARIZ	USC
First downs	22	16
Total yards	385	448
Rushing yards	37–138	36–201
Passing yards	247	247
Passing: Comp–Att–Int	23–38–1	21–30–0
Time of possession	30:02	29:58

Team	Category	Player	Statistics
Arizona	Passing	Grant Gunnell	16/26, 196 yards, 2 TD, INT
Arizona	Rushing	J.J. Taylor	16 carries, 80 yards
Arizona	Receiving	Brian Casteel	5 receptions, 105 yards, 2 TD
USC	Passing	Kedon Slovis	19/28, 232 yards, 2 TD
USC	Rushing	Kenan Christon	8 carries, 103 yards, 2 TD
USC	Receiving	Tyler Vaughns	7 receptions, 73 yards, TD

=== at Stanford ===
Arizona Wildcats (4–3) at Stanford Cardinal (4–3) – Game summary

Quarter	1	2	3	4	Total
Wildcats	10	14	7	0	31
Cardinal	7	24	7	3	41

at Stanford Stadium • Stanford, CA

- Date: October 26, 2019
- Game time: 12:30 P.M.
- Game weather: Sunny and clear, 75 °F (24 °C)
- Game attendance: 31,711
- Referee: Mark Duddy
- TV announcers (Pac-12 Network): Roxy Bernstein (play by play), Anthony Herron (analyst), Jill Savage (sideline reporter)

Game information

First quarter

- (12:07) ARIZ – Lucas Havrisik 29-yard field goal (Drive: 9 plays, 64 yards, 2:53; Arizona 3–0)
- (8:20) STAN – Cameron Scarlett 1-yard run, Ryan Sanborn kick (Drive: 8 plays, 75 yards, 3:47; Stanford 7–3)
- (2:55) ARIZ – Jalen Johnson 8-yard pass from Grant Gunnell, Lucas Havrisik kick (Drive: 8 plays, 65 yards, 2:41; Arizona 10–7)

Second quarter

- (14:54) STAN – Brycen Tremayne 14-yard pass from K.J. Costello, Ryan Sanborn kick (Drive: 7 plays, 49 yards, 2:50; Stanford 14–10)
- (7:55) STAN – Cameron Scarlett 8-yard run, Ryan Sanborn kick (Drive: 9 plays, 75 yards, 5:04; Stanford 21–10)
- (7:29) ARIZ – Khalil Tate 57-yard run, Lucas Havrisik kick (Drive: 2 plays, 75 yards, 0:26; Stanford 21–17)
- (4:36) STAN – Simi Fehoko 44-yard pass from K.J. Costello, Ryan Sanborn kick (Drive: 5 plays, 66 yards, 2:44; Stanford 28–17)
- (1:41) ARIZ – Jamarye Joiner 18-yard pass from Khalil Tate, Lucas Havrisik kick (Drive: 8 plays, 75 yards, 2:55; Stanford 28–24)
- (0:07) STAN – Ryan Sanborn 33-yard field goal (Drive: 10 plays, 60 yards, 1:34; Stanford 31–24)

Third quarter

- (9:32) ARIZ – Drew Dixon 9-yard pass from Khalil Tate, Lucas Havrisik kick (Drive: 8 plays, 73 yards, 2:37; Tied 31–31)
- (5:11) STAN – Simi Fehoko 14-yard pass from K.J. Costello, Ryan Sanborn kick (Drive: 8 plays, 65 yards, 4:21; Stanford 38–31)

Fourth quarter

- (6:18) STAN – Ryan Sanborn 21-yard field goal (Drive: 10 plays, 60 yards, 5:59; Stanford 41–31)

Statistics	ARIZ	STAN
First downs	29	26
Total yards	495	472
Rushing yards	37–222	31–160
Passing yards	273	312
Passing: Comp–Att–Int	24–40–2	30–43–0
Time of possession	25:29	34:31

Team	Category	Player	Statistics
Arizona	Passing	Khalil Tate	17/33, 205 yards, 2 TD, 2 INT
Arizona	Rushing	J.J. Taylor	16 carries, 107 yards
Arizona	Receiving	Tayvian Cunningham	4 receptions, 61 yards
Stanford	Passing	K.J. Costello	30/43, 312 yards, 3 TD
Stanford	Rushing	Cameron Scarlett	19 carries, 102 yards, TD
Stanford	Receiving	Simi Fehoko	3 receptions, 97 yards, 2 TD

=== vs Oregon State ===
Oregon State Beavers (3–4) vs Arizona Wildcats (4–4) – Game summary

Quarter	1	2	3	4	Total
Beavers	7	28	7	14	56
Wildcats	6	13	12	7	38

at Arizona Stadium • Tucson, AZ

- Date: November 2, 2019
- Game time: 1:30 P.M.
- Game weather: Mostly Sunny, 86 °F (30 °C)
- Game attendance: 36,939
- Referee: Michael Mothershed
- TV announcers (Pac-12 Network): Roxy Bernstein (play by play), Anthony Herron (analyst), Jill Savage (sideline reporter)

Game information

First quarter

- (11:28) OSU – Isaiah Hodgins 21-yard pass from Jake Luton, Everett Hayes kick (Drive: 9 plays, 75 yards, 3:32; Oregon State 7–0)
- (6:18) ARIZ – Lucas Havrisik 23-yard field goal (Drive: 14 plays, 70 yards, 5:04; Oregon State 7–3)
- (2:33) ARIZ – Lucas Havrisik 27-yard field goal (Drive: 7 plays, 50 yards, 2:47; Oregon State 7–6)

Second quarter

- (14:04) OSU – Jermar Jefferson 1-yard run, Everett Hayes kick (Drive: 10 plays, 75 yards, 3:29; Oregon State 14–6)
- (13:03) ARIZ – Gary Brightwell 38-yard pass from Grant Gunnell, two-point pass failed (Drive: 3 plays, 75 yards, 1:01; Oregon State 14–12)
- (9:02) OSU – Jermar Jefferson 5-yard run, Everett Hayes kick (Drive: 8 plays, 75 yards, 4:01; Oregon State 21–12)
- (5:41) ARIZ – J.J. Taylor 3-yard run, Lucas Havrisik kick (Drive: 9 plays, 75 yards, 3:21; Oregon State 21–19)
- (2:31) OSU – Artavis Pierce 4-yard run, Everett Hayes kick (Drive: 6 plays, 75 yards, 3:10; Oregon State 28–19)
- (0:04) OSU – Noah Togiai 23-yard pass from Jake Luton, Everett Hayes kick (Drive: 7 plays, 92 yards, 0:54; Oregon State 35–19)

Third quarter

- (10:33) OSU – Jermar Jefferson 5-yard run, Everett Hayes kick (Drive: 7 plays, 65 yards, 3:16; Oregon State 42–19)
- (8:42) ARIZ – Cedric Peterson 35-yard pass from Grant Gunnell, two-point pass failed (Drive: 6 plays, 75 yards, 1:51; Oregon State 42–25)
- (3:20) ARIZ – Gary Brightwell 10-yard run, kick failed (Drive: 10 plays, 55 yards, 3:33; Oregon State 42–31)

Fourth quarter

- (7:58) OSU – Isaiah Hodgins 25-yard pass from Jake Luton, Everett Hayes kick (Drive: 7 plays, 79 yards, 3:18; Oregon State 49–31)
- (4:11) ARIZ – J.J. Taylor 2-yard run, Lucas Havrisik kick (Drive: 12 plays, 75 yards, 3:47; Oregon State 49–38)
- (2:15) OSU – Tyjon Lindsey 24-yard run, Everett Hayes kick (Drive: 3 plays, 38 yards, 1:56; Oregon State 56–38)

Statistics	OSU	ARIZ
First downs	31	33
Total yards	572	526
Rushing yards	42–244	47–148
Passing yards	328	378
Passing: Comp–Att–Int	20–26–0	26–41–0
Time of possession	29:35	30:25

Team	Category	Player	Statistics
Oregon State	Passing	Jake Luton	20/26, 328 yards, 3 TD
Oregon State	Rushing	Artavis Pierce	15 carries, 114 yards, TD
Oregon State	Receiving	Isaiah Hodgins	7 receptions, 150 yards, 2 TD
Arizona	Passing	Grant Gunnell	19/29, 269 yards, 2 TD
Arizona	Rushing	J.J. Taylor	21 carries, 78 yards, 2 TD
Arizona	Receiving	J.J. Taylor	7 receptions, 89 yards

=== at No. 6 Oregon ===
Arizona Wildcats (4–5) at No. 6 Oregon Ducks (8–1) – Game summary

Quarter	1	2	3	4	Total
Wildcats	0	6	0	0	6
#6 Ducks	14	7	7	6	34

at Autzen Stadium • Eugene, OR

- Date: November 16, 2019
- Game time: 8:30 P.M.
- Game weather: Mostly Cloudy, 53 °F (12 °C)
- Game attendance: 54,219
- Referee: Mike McCabe
- TV announcers (ESPN): Dave Pasch (play by play), Greg McElroy (analyst), Tom Luginbill (sideline reporter)

Game information

First quarter

- (14:28) ORE – Johnny Jackson III 73-yard pass from Justin Herbert, Camden Lewis kick (Drive: 2 plays, 75 yards, 0:32; Oregon 7–0)
- (1:57) ORE – Cyrus Habibi-Likio 1-yard run, Camden Lewis kick (Drive: 13 plays, 76 yards, 6:01; Oregon 14–0)

Second quarter

- (5:09) ORE – Juwan Johnson 53-yard pass from Justin Herbert, Camden Lewis kick (Drive: 7 plays, 80 yards, 3:01; Oregon 21–0)
- (2:56) ARIZ – Lucas Havrisik 23-yard field goal (Drive: 7 plays, 48 yards, 2:13; Oregon 21–3)
- (0:00) ARIZ – Lucas Havrisik 42-yard field goal (Drive: 6 plays, 54 yards, 0:55; Oregon 21–6)

Third quarter

- (7:32) ORE – Spencer Webb 24-yard pass from Justin Herbert, Camden Lewis kick (Drive: 4 plays, 41 yards, 1:45; Oregon 28–6)

Fourth quarter

- (10:02) ORE – Travis Dye 33-yard pass from Justin Herbert, kick failed (Drive: 8 plays, 88 yards, 4:14; Oregon 34–6)

Statistics	ARIZ	ORE
First downs	18	21
Total yards	240	471
Rushing yards	39–108	39–138
Passing yards	132	333
Passing: Comp–Att–Int	17–30–0	20–28–1
Time of possession	27:46	32:14

Team	Category	Player	Statistics
Arizona	Passing	Grant Gunnell	10/14, 82 yards
Arizona	Rushing	J.J. Taylor	17 carries, 74 yards
Arizona	Receiving	J.J. Taylor	6 receptions, 55 yards
Oregon	Passing	Justin Herbert	20/28, 333 yards, 4 TD, INT
Oregon	Rushing	Travis Dye	14 carries, 71 yards
Oregon	Receiving	Juwan Johnson	5 receptions, 93 yards, TD

=== vs No. 7 Utah ===
No. 7 Utah Utes (9–1) vs Arizona Wildcats (4–6) – Game summary

Quarter	1	2	3	4	Total
#7 Utes	14	0	14	7	35
Wildcats	0	0	0	7	7

at Arizona Stadium • Tucson, AZ

- Date: November 23, 2019
- Game time: 8:00 P.M.
- Game weather: Clear, 58 °F (14 °C)
- Game attendance: 35,991
- Referee: Mark Duddy
- TV announcers (FS1): Cory Provus (play-by-play), Petros Papadakis (analyst), Shane Vereen (sideline reporter)

Game information

First quarter

- (7:39) UTAH – Brant Kuithe 3-yard run, Jadon Redding kick (Drive: 11 plays, 75 yards, 5:56; Utah 7–0)
- (0:37) UTAH – Demari Simpkins 3-yard pass from Tyler Huntley, Jadon Redding kick (Drive: 10 plays, 72 yards, 5:12; Utah 14–0)

Second quarter

- No scoring plays

Third quarter

- (12:50) UTAH – Zack Moss 41-yard run, Jadon Redding kick (Drive: 6 plays, 75 yards, 2:10; Utah 21–0)
- (8:08) UTAH – Brant Kuithe 6-yard run, Jadon Redding kick (Drive: 6 plays, 75 yards, 3:33; Utah 28–0)

Fourth quarter

- (12:47) UTAH – TJ Green 1-yard run, Jadon Redding kick (Drive: 4 plays, 18 yards, 1:57; Utah 35–0)
- (1:50) ARIZ – Grant Gunnell 7-yard run, Lucas Havrisik kick (Drive: 12 plays, 85 yards, 5:00; Utah 35–7)

Statistics	UTAH	ARIZ
First downs	28	11
Total yards	517	196
Rushing yards	50–297	25–61
Passing yards	220	135
Passing: Comp–Att–Int	20–24–1	14–27–0
Time of possession	39:32	20:28

Team	Category	Player	Statistics
Utah	Passing	Tyler Huntley	19/23, 211 yards, TD, INT
Utah	Rushing	Zack Moss	26 carries, 203 yards, TD
Utah	Receiving	Brant Kuithe	4 receptions, 81 yards
Arizona	Passing	Grant Gunnell	8/16, 96 yards
Arizona	Rushing	J.J. Taylor	10 carries, 33 yards
Arizona	Receiving	Cedric Peterson	4 receptions, 63 yards

=== at Arizona State ===
Arizona Wildcats (4–7) at Arizona State Sun Devils (6–5) – Game summary

Quarter	1	2	3	4	Total
Wildcats	0	7	0	7	14
Sun Devils	0	6	15	3	24

at Sun Devil Stadium • Tempe, AZ

- Date: November 30, 2019
- Game time: 8:00 P.M.
- Game weather: Mostly Clear Skies, 51 °F (11 °C)
- Game attendance: 54,074
- Referee: Steve Strimling
- TV announcers (ESPN): Mark Jones (play by play), Dusty Dvoracek (analyst), Olivia Dekker (sideline reporter)

Game information

First quarter

- No scoring plays

Second quarter

- (13:07) ASU – Christian Zendejas 33-yard field goal (Drive: 6 plays, 25 yards, 2:07; Arizona State 3–0)
- (7:04) ARIZ – Jamarye Joiner 48-yard pass from Khalil Tate, Lucas Havrisik kick (Drive: 6 plays, 83 yards, 2:13; Arizona 7–3)
- (0:00) ASU – Christian Zendejas 24-yard field goal (Drive: 7 plays, 69 yards, 1:50; Arizona 7–6)

Third quarter

- (9:30) ASU – Eno Benjamin 6-yard run, Christian Zendejas kick (Drive: 11 plays, 75 yards, 5:30; Arizona State 13–7)
- (1:20) ASU – Eno Benjamin 1-yard run, Jayden Daniels run for two-point conversion (Drive: 7 plays, 49 yards, 2:45; Arizona State 21–7)

Fourth quarter

- (7:16) ASU – Christian Zendejas 26-yard field goal (Drive: 12 plays, 72 yards, 6:29; Arizona State 24–7)
- (4:48) ARIZ – Jamarye Joiner 2-yard pass from Khalil Tate, Lucas Havrisik kick (Drive: 9 plays, 66 yards, 2:20; Arizona State 24–14)

Statistics	ARIZ	ASU
First downs	19	23
Total yards	383	338
Rushing yards	32–155	55–234
Passing yards	228	104
Passing: Comp–Att–Int	22–38–3	12–19–0
Time of possession	25:31	34:29

Team	Category	Player	Statistics
Arizona	Passing	Khalil Tate	22/38, 228 yards, 2 TD, 3 INT
Arizona	Rushing	Khalil Tate	11 carries, 78 yards
Arizona	Receiving	Jamarye Joiner	7 receptions, 140 yards, 2 TD
Arizona State	Passing	Jayden Daniels	12/19, 104 yards
Arizona State	Rushing	Eno Benjamin	34 carries, 168 yards, 2 TD
Arizona State	Receiving	Brandon Aiyuk	5 receptions, 67 yards

== Statistics ==
Team Statistics
	Arizona	Opponents
Points	151	117
First Downs	98	104
Rushing	44	32
Passing	52	60
Penalty	2	12
Rushing Yards	1,022	549
Rushing Attempts	169	125
Average Per Rush	6.0	4.4
Average per game	255.5	137.2
Rushing TDs	10	6
Passing Yards	1,187	1,344
Comp–Att-INT	88–134–4	114–193–9
Average per game	296.8	336.0
Average per catch	13.5	11.8
Average per pass	8.9	7.0
Passing TDs	10	9
Total Offense'	2,209	1,893
Total Plays	303	318
Average Per Yards/Game	7.3/552.3	6.0/473.2
Kickoffs: # – Yards	27–1,730	23–1,436
Average per kick	64.1	62.4
Net kick average	40.3	41.2
Punts: # – Yards	17–667	14–616
Average per punt	39.2	44.0
Net punt average	35.7	39.6
Kick Returns: # – Yards	7–113	5–116
TDs	0	0
Average	16.1	23.2
Long	23	37
Punt Returns: # – Yards	2–41	4–20
TDs	0	0
Average	20.5	5.0
Long	42	8
INT Returns: # – Yards	9–84	4–49
Average	9.3	12.2
Long	27	49
Fumbles – Fumbles Lost	2–1	2–2
Penalties – Yards	36–326	23–169
Average	81.5	42.2
Time of possession/game	29:40	30:20
3rd–Down Conversion %	33/63 (52%)	29/59 (49%)
4th–Down Conversion %	5/5 (100%)	4/10 (40%)
XP attempts	18–19 (95%)	15–15 (100%)
Field goal attempts	3–5	4–5
Onside kicks	0–0	0–0
Touchdown scored	18	13
Red-zone scores	13–15 (87%)	12–13 (92%)
Red-zone touchdowns	10–15 (67%)	9–13 (69%)
MISC Yards	0	0
Sacks by: - # Yards	4–8	7–30

=== Offense ===
Rushing

Note: G = Games played; ATT = Attempts; YDS = Yards; AVG = Average yard per carry; LG = Longest run; TD = Rushing touchdowns

Name	GP	Att	Gain	Loss	Net	Avg	TD	Long	Avg/G
#23 Gary Brightwell	4	33	265	6	259 yards	7.8	4 TDs	94	64.8
#14 Khalil Tate (QB)	3	42	267	29	238 yards	78.4	2 TDs	84	79.3
#21 J. J. Taylor	3	35	213	5	208 yards	5.9	2 TDs	40	69.3
#20 Darrius Smith	3	23	186	4	182 yards	7.9	1 TDs	47	60.7
#33 Nathan Tilford	3	10	81	7	74 yards	7.4	1 TDs	28	24.7
#6 Michael Wiley	4	18	55	6	49 yards	2.7	0 TDs	9	12.2
#5 Brian Casteel (WR)	4	2	14	0	14 yards	7.0	0 TDs	9	3.5
#28 Nazar Bombata	2	2	12	0	12 yards	6.0	0 TDs	7	6.0
#17 Grant Gunnell (QB)	2	8	21	15	6 yards	0.8	0 TDs	9	3.0
#11 Tayvian Cunningham (WR)	4	1	0	1	-1 yards	-1.0	0 TDs	0	-0.2
#4 Rhett Rodriguez (QB)	1	1	0	3	-3 yards	-3.0	0 TDs	0	-3.0
TEAM	4	4	0	16	-16 yards	-4.0	0 TDs	0	-4.0
Total	4	169	1,114	92	1,022 yards	6.0	10 TDs	94	255.5

Passing

Note: G = Games played; COMP = Completions; ATT = Attempts; COMP % = Completion percentage; YDS = Passing yards; TD = Passing touchdowns; INT = Interceptions; EFF = Passing efficiency

Name	GP	Att-Cmp-Int	Pct	EFFP	Yds	TD	Lng	Avg/G
#14 Khalil Tate	3	50–74–4	63.3%	150.96	684 yards	6 TDs	57	228.0
#17 Grant Gunnell	2	33–55–0	69.1%	169.91	503 yards	4 TDs	75	251.5
Total	4	88–134–4	65.7%	158.74	1,187 yards	10 TDs	75	296.8

Receiving

Note: G = Games played; REC = Receptions; YDS = Yards; AVG = Average yard per catch; LG = Longest catch; TD = Receiving touchdowns

Name	GP	Att	Yards	Avg	TD	Long	Avg/G
#86 Stanley Berryhill	4	12	187 yards	15.6	2 TDs	57	46.8
#11 Tayvian Cunningham	4	16	177 yards	11.1	2 TDs	47	44.2
#20 Darrius Smith (RB)	3	8	153 yards	19.1	2 TDs	75	51.0
#10 Jamarye Joiner	4	10	139 yards	13.9	1 TDs	27	34.8
#18 Cedric Peterson	4	8	107 yards	13.4	1 TDs	47	26.8
#5 Brian Casteel	4	14	106 yards	7.6	0 TDs	17	26.5
#1 Drew Dixon	4	9	100 yards	1.1	1 TDs	24	25.0
#16 Thomas Reid III	4	2	85 yards	42.5	1 TDs	75	21.2
#6 Michael Wiley (RB)	4	5	81 yards	16.2	0 TDs	34	20.2
#81 Bryce Wolma	3	1	14 yards	14.0	1 TDs	14	7.0
#9 Jalen Johnson	1	1	14 yards	14.0	0 TDs	14	14.0
#21 J. J. Taylor (RB)	3	1	13 yards	13.0	0 TDs	13	4.3
#23 Gary Brightwell (RB)	4	1	11 yards	11.0	0 TDs	11	2.8
Total	4	88	1,187 yards	13.5	10 TDs	75	296.8

=== Defense ===
Note: G = Games played; Solo = Solo tackles; Ast = Assisted tackles; Total = Total tackles; TFL-Yds = Tackles for loss-yards lost; Sack = Sacks; INT = Interceptions; PD = Passes defended; FF = Forced fumbles; FR = Forced recoveries

Name	GP	Tackles				Sacks	Passing Defense		Interceptions				Fumbles		Blkd Kick	S
Name	GP	Solo	Ast	Total	TFL-Yds	No-Yds	BrUp	QBH	No.-Yds	Avg	TD	Long	Rcv-Yds	FF	Blkd Kick	S
#1 Tony Fields II	4	22	6	28	2.0–2 yards	0–0 yards	0	0	1–14 yards	14.0	0 TDs	14	0–0 yards	0	0	0
#2 Lorenzo Burns	4	12	3	15	0.5–1 yards	0–0 yards	4	0	3–26 yards	7.0	0 TDs	14	0–0 yards	0	0	0
#3 Jarrius Wallace	3	7	0	7	0–0 yards	0–0 yards	0	0	0–0 yards	0.0	0 TDs	0	0–0 yards	0	0	0
#4 Christian Roland-Wallace	4	7	0	7	0–0 yards	0–0 yards	1	0	0–0 yards	0.0	0 TDs	0	0–0 yards	0	0	0
#5 Christian Young	4	10	3	13	0–0 yards	0–0 yards	3	0	0–0 yards	0.0	0 TDs	0	1–0 yards	2	0	0
#6 Scottie Young Jr.	3	14	1	15	1.0–10–0 yards	0–0 yards	2	0	0–0 yards	0.0	0 TDs	0	0–0 yards	0	0	0
#7 Colin Schooler	4	24	8	32	4.0–10 yards	0.5–3 yards	0	0	0–0 yards	0.0	0 TDs	0	1–10 yards	0	0	0
#8 Anthony Pandy	4	19	5	24	3.0–7 yards	1.0–1 yards	0	0	1–27 yards	0.0	0 TDs	0	0–0 yards	0	0	0
#9 Dayven Coleman	4	5	1	6	0–0 yards	0–0 yards	0	0	0–0 yards	0.0	0 TDs	0	0–0 yards	0	0	0
#10 Malcolm Holland	3	0	1	1	0.5–2 yards	0–0 yards	0	0	0–0 yards	0.0	0 TDs	0	0–0 yards	0	0	0
#11 Troy Young	4	5	0	5	0–0 yards	0–0 yards	0	0	0–0 yards	0.0	0 TDs	0	0–0 yards	0	0	0
#12 J.B. Brown	4	3	2	5	1.0–1 yards	0–0 yards	0	1	0–0 yards	0.0	0 TDs	0	0–0 yards	0	0	0
#13 Chacho Ulloa	2	2	1	3	0.5–1 yards	0–0 yards	0	0	0–0 yards	0.0	0 TDs	0	0–0 yards	0	0	0
#14 Kylan Wilborn	4	0	3	3	0–0 yards	0–0 yards	0	0	0–0 yards	0.0	0 TDs	0	0–0 yards	0	0	0
#15 McKenzie Barnes	4	1	0	1	0–0 yards	0–0 yards	0	0	0–0 yards	0.0	0 TDs	0	0–0 yards	0	0	0
#17 Jace Whittaker	4	11	0	11	0–0 yards	0–0 yards	4	0	3–17 yards	5.7	0 TDs	17	0–0 yards	0	0	0
#18 Cedric Peterson (WR)	4	1	0	1	0–0 yards	0–0 yards	0	0	0–0 yards	0.0	0 TDs	0	0–0 yards	0	0	0
#19 Kwabena Watson	2	1	0	1	0–0 yards	0–0 yards	0	0	0–0 yards	0.0	0 TDs	0	0–0 yards	0	0	0
#23 Malik Hausman	2	2	0	2	0–0 yards	0–0 yards	0	0	0–0 yards	0.0	0 TDs	0	0–0 yards	0	0	0
#23 Gary Brightwell (RB)	4	0	1	1	0–0 yards	0–0 yards	0	0	0–0 yards	0.0	0 TDs	0	0–0 yards	0	0	0
#25 Bobby Wolfe	4	2	0	2	0–0 yards	0–0 yards	0	0	0–0 yards	0.0	0 TDs	0	0–0 yards	0	0	0
#27 Derrion Clark	4	1	0	1	0–0 yards	0–0 yards	0	0	0–0 yards	0.0	0 TDs	0	0–0 yards	0	0	0
#29 Samari Springs	3	1	0	1	0–0 yards	0–0 yards	0	0	0–0 yards	0.0	0 TDs	0	0–0 yards	0	0	0
#31 Tristan Cooper	3	9	1	10	0–0 yards	0–0 yards	2	0	0–0 yards	0.0	0 TDs	0	0–0 yards	0	0	0
#49 Jalen Harris	4	10	1	11	4.5–12 yards	2.5–4 yards	0	0	0–0 yards	0.0	0 TDs	0	0–0 yards	0	0	0
#51 Lee Anderson III	3	2	0	2	0–0 yards	0–0 yards	0	0	0–0 yards	0.0	0 TDs	0	0–0 yards	0	0	0
#61 Seth MacKellar (LS)	3	1	0	1	0–0 yards	0–0 yards	0	0	0–0 yards	0.0	0 TDs	0	0–0 yards	0	0	0
#86 Justin Belknap	4	0	3	3	0–0 yards	0–0 yards	0	0	0–0 yards	0.0	0 TDs	0	0–0 yards	0	0	0
#90 Trevon Mason	4	6	5	11	1.0–3 yards	0–0 yards	0	0	0–0 yards	0.0	0 TDs	0	0–0 yards	0	0	0
#91 Finton Connolly	4	4	1	5	0–0 yards	0–0 yards	0	0	0–0 yards	0.0	0 TDs	0	0–0 yards	0	0	0
#92 Kyon Barrs	3	2	0	2	0–0 yards	0–0 yards	0	0	0–0 yards	0.0	0 TDs	0	0–0 yards	0	0	0
#99 Myles Tapusoa	4	2	2	4	0–0 yards	0–0 yards	0	0	0–0 yards	0.0	0 TDs	0	0–0 yards	0	0	0
TEAM	3	0	0	0	0–0 yards	0–0 yards	0	0	0–0 yards	0.0	0 TDs	0	0–0 yards	0	0	1
Total	4	191	48	239	18–40 yards	4–8 yards	21	1	9–84 yards	9.0	0 TDs	27	2–10 yards	2	0	1

=== Special teams ===
Kick and punt returning

Note: G = Games played; PR = Punt returns; PYDS = Punt return yards; PLG = Punt return long; KR = Kick returns; KYDS = Kick return yards; KLG = Kick return long; TD = Total return touchdowns

Pos.	Player	G	PR	PYDS	PLG	AVG	Total PR TDs	KR	KYDS	KLG	Total KOR TDs	AVG
RB	Gary Brightwell	3	0	0	0	0	0	3	39	22	0	13.0
RB	J. J. Taylor	3	0	0	1	0	0	2	44	23	0	22.0
WR	Tayvian Cunningham	3	0	0	0	0	0	1	23	23	0	23.0
RB	Nathan Tilford	3	0	0	0	0	0	1	7	7	0	7.0
WR	Brian Casteel	3	1	42	42	42.0	0	0	0	0	0	0.0
WR	Stanley Berryhill	3	1	-1	-1	0.0	0	0	0	0	0	0.0
Total		3	2	41 yards	41	20.5	0 TDs	7	113 yards	23	0 TDs	16.1

Kicking

Note: G = Games played; FGM = Field goals made; FGA = Field goals attempted; LG = Field goal long; XPT = Extra points made; XPT ATT = XPT attempted; In20 = Kicking inside the 20; 20-29 = Kicking inside the 20-29; 30-39 = Kicking inside the 30-39; 40-49 = Kicking inside the 40-49; 50 = Kicking inside the 50; TP = Total points

Pos.	Player	G	FGM	FGA	PCT	LG	10–19	I20	30–39	40–49	50+	BLK	NO.	XPT	XPT ATT	PCT	KO Yards	TB	TP	AVG	OB
K	Lucas Havrisik	4	3	5	60%	53	0-0	0–0	0–1	2–2	1–2	0	27	18	19	95%	1,730	21	23	64.1	0

Punting

Note: G = Games played; P = Punts; YDS = Yards; AVG = Average per punt; LG = Punt long; In20 = Punts inside the 20; TB = Touchbacks

Pos.	Player	G	No.	YDS	AVG	Long	FC	In20	50+	TB	BLK
P	Matt Aragon	4	15	594	39.4	70	2	5	1	2	0
P	Kyle Ostendorp	3	2	76	38.0	42	1	0	0	0	0
Total		4	17	667 yards	39.2	70	3	5	1	2	0

== Scoring ==
=== Scores by quarter (non-conference opponents) ===
	1	2	3	4	Total
All opponents	28	20	28	24	100
Arizona	21	64	21	25	131

=== Scores by quarter (Pac-12 opponents) ===
	1	2	3	4	Total
Pac-12 opponents	10	17	17	3	47
Arizona	7	13	21	14	55

=== Scores by quarter (all opponents) ===
	1	2	3	4	Total
All opponents	35	20	38	24	117
Arizona	21	70	28	32	151

== Awards and honors ==
Weekly awards
Player	Position	Date	Ref.
Grant Gunnell (Pac-12 Freshman Player of the Week)	QB	September 30, 2019	
Lucas Havrisik (Pac-12 Special Teams Player of the Week)	PK	October 14, 2019	

Individual awards
Player	Position	Award	Ref.

All-American
Player	AP	AFCA	FWAA	TSN	WCFF	Designation
The NCAA recognizes a selection to all five of the AP, AFCA, FWAA, TSN and WCFF first teams for unanimous selections and three of five for consensus selections. HM = Honorable mention. Source:

All-Pac-12
Player	Position	Team
HM = Honorable mention. Source:

All-Pac-12 Academic
Player	Position	Class	Major	Ref.
HM = Honorable mention. Source:

== Media affiliates ==
=== Radio ===
- ESPN Radio – (ESPN Tucson 1490 AM & 104.09 FM) – Nationwide (Dish Network, Sirius XM, TuneIn radio and iHeartRadio)
- KCUB 1290 AM – Football Radio Show – (Tucson, AZ)
- KHYT – 107.5 FM (Tucson, AZ)
- KTKT 990 AM – La Hora de Los Gatos (Spanish) – (Tucson, AZ)
- KGME 910 AM – (IMG Sports Network) – (Phoenix, AZ)
- KTAN 1420 AM – (Sierra Vista, AZ)
- KDAP 96.5 FM (Douglas, Arizona)
- KWRQ 102.3 FM – (Safford, AZ/Thatcher, AZ)
- KIKO 1340 AM – (Globe, AZ)
- KVWM 970 AM – (Show Low, AZ/Pinetop-Lakeside, AZ)
- XENY 760 – (Nogales, Sonora) (Spanish)

=== TV ===
- CBS Family - KOLD (CBS), CBSN
- ABC/ESPN Family - KGUN (ABC), ABC, ESPN, ESPN2, ESPNU, ESPN+,
- FOX Family - KMSB (FOX), FOX/FS1, FSN
- Pac-12 Network (Pac-12 Arizona)
