= 2020 Arizona Wildcats football team =

American college football season

2020 Arizona Wildcats football
- Conference: Pac-12 Conference
- South Division
- Record: 0–5 (0–5 Pac-12)
- Head coach: Kevin Sumlin (3rd season)
- Offensive coordinator: Noel Mazzone (3rd season)
- Offensive scheme: Spread
- Defensive coordinator: Paul Rhoads (1st season)
- Base defense: 4–2–5
- Home stadium: Arizona Stadium

Uniform
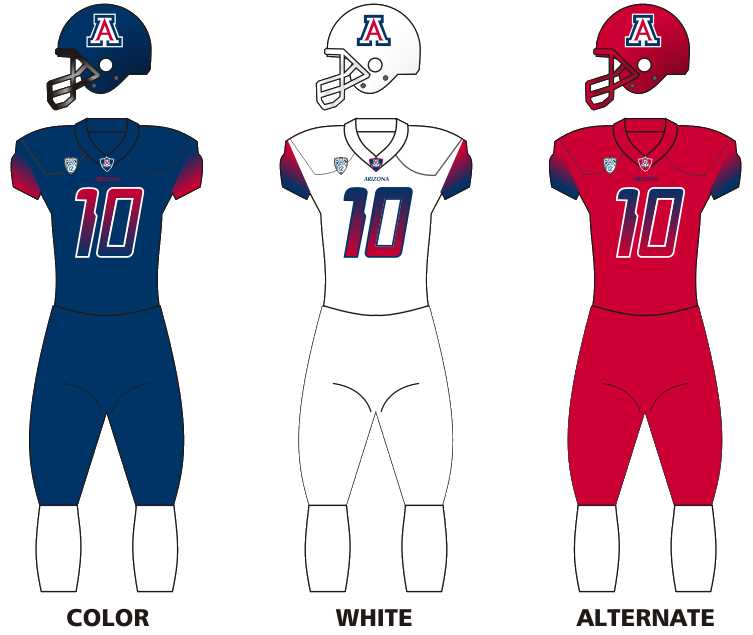

2020 Pac-12 Conference football standings
	Conf.			Overall
Team	W		L	W		L
North Division
Washington x	3	–	1	3	–	1
Oregon y$	3	–	2	4	–	3
Stanford	4	–	2	4	–	2
California	1	–	3	1	–	3
Washington State	1	–	3	1	–	3
Oregon State	2	–	5	2	–	5
South Division
No. 21 USC xy	5	–	0	5	–	1
Colorado	3	–	1	4	–	2
Utah	3	–	2	3	–	2
Arizona State	2	–	2	2	–	2
UCLA	3	–	4	3	–	4
Arizona	0	–	5	0	–	5
Championship: Oregon 31, USC 24
$ – Conference champion; x – Division champion/co-champions; y – Championship game participant; Note: Due to COVID-19, the Pac-12 suspended the season on August 11, but later decided to begin play on November 6. In addition to the title game on December 18, the conference seeded all remaining teams for a game during that weekend.; Rankings from AP Poll.

The 2020 Arizona Wildcats football team represented the University of Arizona in the 2020 NCAA Division I FBS football season. Arizona was led by third-year head coach Kevin Sumlin, in the Wildcats' 121st season. The Wildcats played in the South Division (11th season) of the Pac-12 Conference, and played their home games at Arizona Stadium in Tucson, Arizona (93rd season).

On August 11, the Pac-12 Conference initially canceled all fall sports competitions due to the COVID-19 pandemic. On September 24, the conference announced that a six-game conference-only season would begin on November 6, with the Pac-12 Championship Game to be played December 18. Teams not selected for the championship game would be seeded to play a seventh game.

On December 12, 2020, Sumlin was fired after three seasons following a 70–7 loss to ASU in the Territorial Cup on December 11, 2020. He finished at Arizona with an overall record of 9–20 and 6–17 against the Pac-12. On December 23, 2020, the University of Arizona hired Jedd Fisch as the 32nd head coach.

== Offseason ==
=== Departures ===
Name	Number	Pos.	Height	Weight	Year	Hometown	Notes
Khalil Tate	14	QB	6'0	195	Senior	Inglewood, California	Graduated
J. J. Taylor	21	RB	5'6	180	Junior	Corona, California	Declared for the 2020 NFL draft
Cedric Peterson	18	WR	5'11	188	RS senior	Moreno Valley, California	Graduated
Daniel Egbo	41	WR	6'2	192	Senior	Gilbert, Arizona	Graduated
Lee Anderson	51	LB	6'1	246	Senior	Moreno Valley, California	Graduated
Matt Aargon	26	P	6'5	211	Senior	Tucson, Arizona	Graduated
Finton Connolly	91	DT	6'5	300	RS senior	Gilbert, Arizona	Graduated
Tristan Cooper	31	S	6'2	198	Senior	El Paso, Texas	Graduated
Cody Creason	76	OL	6'4	295	RS senior	Folsom, California	Graduated
Malcolm Holland	12	WR	5'11	189	RS senior	Chandler, Arizona	Graduated
Terrance Johnson	83	WR	6'2	211	RS senior	Tucson, Arizona	Graduated
Jace Whittaker	17	CB	5'11	185	RS senior	Oceanside, California	Graduated

=== Recruiting ===
College recruiting
Name	Hometown	School	Height	Weight	Commit date
Will Plummer; QB	Gilbert, AZ	Gilbert High School	6 ft 1 in (1.85 m)	205 lb (93 kg)	Jan 30, 2019
Will Plummer; QB	Recruit ratings: Rivals: 247Sports: ESPN: (78)				
Frank Brown; RB	Baytown, TX	Ross Sterling High School	6 ft 0 in (1.83 m)	180 lb (82 kg)	Jan 14, 2020
Frank Brown; RB	Recruit ratings: Rivals: 247Sports: ESPN: (76)				
Derick Mourning; LB	Katy, TX	Patricia E. Paetow High School	6 ft 3 in (1.91 m)	210 lb (95 kg)	Feb 2, 2020
Derick Mourning; LB	Recruit ratings: Rivals: 247Sports: ESPN: (76)				
Regen Terry; DE	Florence, AZ	Florence High School	6 ft 4 in (1.93 m)	230 lb (100 kg)	Dec 9, 2019
Regen Terry; DE	Recruit ratings: Rivals: 247Sports: ESPN: (76)				
Edric Whitney; CB	Pflugerville, TX	Weiss High School	5 ft 11 in (1.80 m)	160 lb (73 kg)	Feb 5, 2020
Edric Whitney; CB	Recruit ratings: Rivals: 247Sports: ESPN: (76)				
Roberto Miranda; TE	Berlin, Germany	Schul- und Leistungssportzentrum	6 ft 3 in (1.91 m)	225 lb (102 kg)	Oct 15, 2019
Roberto Miranda; TE	Recruit ratings: Rivals: 247Sports: ESPN: (75)				
Majon Wright; S	Fort Lauderdale, FL	Cardinal Gibbons High School	6 ft 2 in (1.88 m)	190 lb (86 kg)	Dec 15, 2019
Majon Wright; S	Recruit ratings: Rivals: 247Sports: ESPN: (75)				
Paris Shand; DE	Windsor, CT	Loomis Chaffee School	6 ft 5 in (1.96 m)	240 lb (110 kg)	Feb 8, 2020
Paris Shand; DE	Recruit ratings: Rivals: 247Sports: ESPN: (75)				
Jalen John; RB	Lake Oswego, OR	Lakeridge High School	5 ft 11 in (1.80 m)	206 lb (93 kg)	Jul 15, 2019
Jalen John; RB	Recruit ratings: Rivals: 247Sports: ESPN: (75)				
Dyelan Miller; WR	Peoria, AZ	Centennial High School	6 ft 2 in (1.88 m)	190 lb (86 kg)	Jul 4, 2019
Dyelan Miller; WR	Recruit ratings: Rivals: 247Sports: ESPN: (74)				
Leif Magnuson; OT	Toronto, Ontario, Canada	Bethlehem Catholic High School	6 ft 4 in (1.93 m)	260 lb (120 kg)	Jan 22, 2020
Leif Magnuson; OT	Recruit ratings: Rivals: 247Sports: ESPN: (74)				
Dion Wilson; ATH	Vista, CA	Vista High School	6 ft 5 in (1.96 m)	250 lb (110 kg)	Jul 19, 2019
Dion Wilson; ATH	Recruit ratings: Rivals: 247Sports: ESPN: (74)				
Jabar Triplett; LB	Baton Rouge, LA	Southern University Laboratory School	6 ft 0 in (1.83 m)	215 lb (98 kg)	Oct 13, 2019
Jabar Triplett; LB	Recruit ratings: Rivals: 247Sports: ESPN: (74)				
Tyler Loop; K	Allen, TX	Lovejoy High School	6 ft 0 in (1.83 m)	165 lb (75 kg)	Sep 8, 2019
Tyler Loop; K	Recruit ratings: Rivals: 247Sports: ESPN: (73)				
Shontrail Key; DE	Chicago, IL	Morgan Park High School	6 ft 7 in (2.01 m)	250 lb (110 kg)	Feb 5, 2020
Shontrail Key; DE	Recruit ratings: Rivals: 247Sports: ESPN: (73)				
Josh Baker; OL	Eureka, MO	Eureka High School	6 ft 3 in (1.91 m)	280 lb (130 kg)	Jun 7, 2019
Josh Baker; OL	Recruit ratings: ESPN: (73)				
Woody Jean; OG	Deerfield Beach, FL	Deerfield Beach High School	6 ft 4 in (1.93 m)	270 lb (120 kg)	Jun 25, 2019
Woody Jean; OG	Recruit ratings: Rivals: 247Sports: ESPN: (73)				
Khary Crump; CB	Culver City, CA	Culver City High School	5 ft 11 in (1.80 m)	160 lb (73 kg)	Apr 13, 2019
Khary Crump; CB	Recruit ratings: Rivals: 247Sports: ESPN: (73)				
Stacey Marshall; TE	Montgomery, AL	Hutchinson Community College (JC)	6 ft 4 in (1.93 m)	220 lb (100 kg)	Dec 18, 2019
Stacey Marshall; TE	Recruit ratings: Rivals: 247Sports: ESPN: (70)				
Anthony Patt; OT	San Marcos, CA	San Marcos High School	6 ft 5 in (1.96 m)	265 lb (120 kg)	Apr 6, 2020
Anthony Patt; OT	Recruit ratings: 247Sports:				
Sam Langi; OL	San Mateo, CA	College of San Mateo (JC)	6 ft 5 in (1.96 m)	315 lb (143 kg)	Mar 28, 2020
Sam Langi; OL	Recruit ratings: Rivals: 247Sports:				
Isaiah Mays; CB	Berkeley, CA	City College of San Francisco (JC)	6 ft 1 in (1.85 m)	177 lb (80 kg)	Jul 16, 2020
Isaiah Mays; CB	Recruit ratings: No ratings found				
Overall recruit ranking:
‡ Refers to 40-yard dash; Note: In many cases, Scout, Rivals, 247Sports, On3, and ESPN may conflict in their listings of height, weight and 40 time.; In these cases, the average was taken. ESPN grades are on a 100-point scale.; Sources: "Arizona Football Commitment List". Rivals.; "2020 Player Commitments – Arizona". ESPN.; "2020 Team Ranking". Rivals.com.; "2020 Arizona Wildcats football team". 247Sports.

=== Transfers ===
The Wildcats lose multiple players due to various reasons.

Outgoing

Name	No.	Pos.	Height	Weight	Year	Hometown	New school
Dayven Coleman	9	LB	6'2	216	Sophomore	Dallas, Texas	Stephen F. Austin
Chaco Ulloa	13	S	5'11	200	Senior	Corona, California	Montana State
Jake Peters	80	TE	6'4	222	Freshman	Coto de Caza, California	Colorado
Thomas Marcus	84	WR	6'2	203	Freshman	San Diego, California	Montana State
Justin Belknap	86	DL	6'3	245	RS senior	Henderson, Nevada	Montana
Troy Young	11	S	6'0	205	Junior	Prichard, Alabama	UAB
Scottie Young Jr.	6	S	5'11	201	Junior	San Diego, California	West Virginia
Xavier Bell	37	S	6'2	196	RS junior	Long Beach, California	Portland State
Tony Fields II	1	LB	6'1	220	Senior	Las Vegas, Nevada	West Virginia
Colin Schooler	7	LB	6'1	230	Junior	Dana Point, California	Texas Tech
Brenden Schooler	8	WR	6'2	193	Senior	Dana Point, California	Texas

Incoming

Name	No.	Pos.	Height	Weight	Year	Hometown	Prev. school
Aaron Blackwell	52	DL	6'3	298	Senior	Peoria, Arizona	New Mexico
Roy Lopez	51	DL	6'2	310	Senior	Tempe, Arizona	New Mexico State
Matthew Stefanski	--	OL	6'4	314	Freshman	Frankfort, Michigan	Grand Valley State

=== Position key ===
Back	B	Center	C	Cornerback	CB	Defensive back	DB
Defensive end	DE	Defensive lineman	DL	Defensive tackle	DT	End	E
Fullback	FB	Guard	G	Halfback	HB	Kicker	K
Kickoff returner	KR	Offensive tackle	OT	Offensive lineman	OL	Linebacker	LB
Long snapper	LS	Punter	P	Punt returner	PR	Quarterback	QB
Running back	RB	Safety	S	Tight end	TE	Wide receiver	WR

=== Returning starters ===
Offense

Player	Class	Position
Grant Gunnell	Sophomore	Quarterback
Gary Brightwell	Senior	Running back
Jarmarye Joiner	RS sophomore	Wide receiver
Stanley Berryhill	RS junior	Wide receiver
Bryce Wolma	Senior	Tight end
Josh McCauley	RS senior	Offensive line

Defense

Player	Class	Position
J.B. Brown	Senior	Defensive end
Anthony Pandy	Senior	Linebacker
Jarrius Wallace	RS senior	Defensive back

Special teams

Player	Class	Position
Lucas Havrisik	Senior	Placekicker
Jarmarye Joiner	RS sophomore	Kick returner

† Indicates player was a starter in 2019 but missed all of 2020 due to injury.

== Preseason ==
=== Award watch lists ===
Listed in the order that they were released

Award	Player	Position	Year
Doak Walker Award	Gary Brightwell	RB	Sr.
Wuerffel Trophy	Colin Schooler	LB	SR

=== Pac-12 Media Day ===
The Pac-12 Media Day was held in July 2020 in Hollywood, California.

== Personnel ==
=== Coaching staff ===
Name	Position	Year at Arizona	Alma mater
Kevin Sumlin	Head coach	3rd	Purdue
Noel Mazzone	Offensive coordinator/quarterbacks	3rd	New Mexico
Paul Rhoads	Defensive coordinator/safeties	1st	Missouri Western
Taylor Mazzone	Assistant coach/outside Receivers	3rd	East Carolina
Greg Burns	Assistant coach/cornerbacks	1st	Washington State
Stan Eggen	Assistant coach/defensive line	1st	Moorhead State
Kyle DeVan	Assistant coach/offensive line	2nd	Oregon State
Andy Buh	Assistant coach/linebackers	1st	Nevada
AJ Steward	Assistant coach/running backs	1st	Kansas
Theron Aych	Assistant coach/inside wide receivers	4th	Northern State
Jeremy Springer	Tight ends/Special teams	3rd	UTEP
Brian Johnson	Strength and Conditioning	3rd	LSU

=== Roster ===
2020 Arizona Wildcats roster
Quarterbacks: 4 – Rhett Rodriguez – (redshirt) junior (6'0, 192); 12 – Kevin Doyle – (redshirt) sophomore (6'3, 205); 13 – Luke Ashworth – (redshirt) sophomore (6'1, 200); 15 – Will Plummer – freshman (6'1, 208); 16 – Cameron Fietz – (redshirt) junior (6'1, 196); 17 – Grant Gunnell – sophomore (6'6, 225); Running backs: 0 – Gary Brightwell – senior (6'1, 210); 6 – Michael Wiley – sophomore (5'11, 186); 8 – Frank Brown – freshman (6'0, 200); 20 – Darrius Smith – (redshirt) sophomore (5'9, 176); 21 – Jalen John – freshman (5'11, 222); 28 – Nazar Bombata – (redshirt) sophomore (6'0, 206); 33 – Nathan Tilford – (redshirt) junior (6'2, 207); Wide receiver: 1 – Drew Dixon – (redshirt) junior (6'3, 205); 2 – Boobie Curry – sophomore (6'2, 206); 3 – Jalen Johnson – sophomore (6'2, 199); 5 – Brian Casteel – senior (6'0, 195); 7 – Jaden Mitchell – (redshirt) freshman (5'9, 175); 9 – Tre Adams – (redshirt) sophomore (6'3, 195); 10 – Jamarye Joiner – (redshirt) sophomore (6'1, 210); 11 – Tayvian Cunningham – senior (5'7, 181); 14 – Dyelan Miller – freshman (6'2, 192); 16 – Thomas Reid III – (redshirt) senior (6'2, 205); 18 – Ma'Jon Wright – freshman (6'2, 197); 25 – Valen Jones – freshman (6'2, 164); 29 – Jashon Butler – (redshirt) sophomore (5'8, 182); 85 – Roberto Miranda – freshman (6'2, 217); 86 – Stanley Berryhill – (redshirt) junior (5'10, 177); Tight end: 42 – Connor Hutchings – junior (6'4, 230) (OL+); 46 – Jack Koceman – (redshirt) sophomore (6'4, 235); 81 – Bryce Wolma – senior (6'4, 245); 82 – Zach Williams – (redshirt) sophomore (6'3, 216); 84 – Tristen D'Angelo – junior (6'3, 203); 87 – Stacey Marshall – junior (6'5, 248); Punter: 19 – Kyle Ostendorp – sophomore (6'1, 202); 32 – Jacob Meeker-Hackett – (redshirt) senior (6'0, 199) (WR+)	Offensive lineman: 50 – Josh McCauley – (redshirt) senior (6'3, 292); 54 – Matthew Stefanski – junior (6'4, 314); 55 – Jamari Williams – (redshirt) freshman (6'3, 298); 56 – Josh Donovan – (redshirt) junior (6'5, 317); 58 – Sam Langi – junior (6'5, 329); 62 – Jacob Bracamonte – freshman (6'3, 298); 63 – Steven Bailey – (redshirt) senior (6'3, 305); 65 – Leif Magnuson – freshman (6'4, 284); 66 – Robert Congel – (redshirt) junior (6'3, 310); 67 – David Watson – (redshirt) sophomore (6'5, 303); 71 – Darrell Branch – freshman (6'2, 319); 72 – Edgar Burrola – (redshirt) junior (6'6, 305); 73 – Woody Jean – freshman (6'4, 314); 74 – Paiton Fears – (redshirt) junior (6'5, 328); 76 – Anthony Patt – freshman (6'4, 280); 77 – Jordan Morgan – sophomore (6'5, 287); 78 – Donovan Laie – junior (6'4, 315); 79 – Tyson Gardner – (redshirt) junior (6'4, 300); Defensive lineman: 12 – JB Brown – senior (6'3, 255) (DE+); 17 – Regen Terry – freshman (6'4, 289); 19 – Kwabena Watson – (redshirt) freshman (6'2, 210) (DE+); 26 – Eddie Siaumau-Sanitoa – (redshirt) freshman (6'3, 235); 40 – Dante Diaz–Infante – senior (6'1, 250) (DE+); 44 – Shontrail Key – freshman (6'4, 248); 45 – Issaiah Johnson – (redshirt) sophomore (6'1, 245) (DE+); 51 – Roy Lopez – graduate (6'2, 310); 52 – Aaron Blackwell – graduate (6'3, 298); 55 – Chandler Kelly – freshman (6'2, 209); 58 – Nahe Sulunga – (redshirt) sophomore (6'2, 275) (DT+); 60 – Mykee Irving – (redshirt) sophomore (6'3, 337); 90 – Trevon Mason – senior (6'5, 310); 92 – Kyon Barrs – sophomore (6'2, 299) (DT+); 93 – Ugochukwu Nosike – freshman (6'3, 280); 94 – Dion Wilson Jr. – freshman (6'4, 276, 319); 95 – Paris Shand – freshman (6'5, 272); 97 – Naz Higgins – sophomore (6'3, 272) (DT+); 99 – Myles Tapousa – senior (6'1, 330); Linebackers: 8 – Anthony Pandy – senior (6'0, 225); 10 – Jabar Triplett – freshman (6'1, 226); 18 – Derrick Mourning – freshman (6'3, 229); 27 – Derrion Clark – sophomore (6'1, 211); 32 – Calib McRae – sophomore (6'1, 246); 34 – John Burton – (redshirt) freshman (5'11, 210); 38 – Dante Smith – (redshirt) sophomore (5'10, 223); 41 – Mike Saliba – freshman (6'0, 188); 42 – Jeremiah Fletcher – freshman (5'11, 203); 46 – Thor Canales – freshman (6'3, 224); 47 – Rourke Freeburg – (redshirt) junior (6'2, 204); 48 – Parker Henley – (redshirt) junior (5'11, 222); 49 – Jalen Harris – (redshirt) junior (6'5, 250); Placekicker': 33 – Tyler Loop – freshman (6'0, 164); 43 – Lucas Havrisik – senior (6'2, 184); 80 – Nathan Halsell – (redshirt) freshman (6'1, 205)	Defensive backs: 2 – Lorenzo Burns – (redshirt) senior (5'11, 175) (CB+); 3 – Jarrius Wallace – (redshirt) senior (6'1, 185) (S+); 4 – Christian Roland-Wallace – sophomore (5'11, 198) (CB+); 5 – Christian Young – junior (6'2, 217) (S+); 11 – Edric Whitley – freshman (5'11, 144); 13 – Isaiah Mays – junior (6'1, 190); 15 – McKenzie Barnes – junior (6'1, 193) (CB+); 20 – Khary Crump – freshman (5'11, 164); 21 – Jaxen Turner – sophomore (6'0, 189) (S+); 23 – Malik Hausman – (redshirt) junior (6'0, 175) (CB+); 24 – Rhedi Short – (redshirt) junior (6'1, 194) (S+); 25 – Bobby Wolfe – sophomore (6'1, 170) (CB+); 29 – Donte Bowers Jr. – freshman (5'10, 163); 30 – Quinn Sullivan – sophomore (5'11, 181) (S+); 31 – Trey Cartledge – freshman (6'0, 170); 35 – Adama Fall – freshman (6'3, 200); 36 – RJ Edwards – freshman (6'1, 198); 37 – Jaydin Young – freshman (6'0, 182); 39 – Treydan Stukes – freshman (6'0, 168); Long snapper: 64 – Seth Mackellar – sophomore (5'11, 195); Legend: (C) Team captain; (S) Suspended; (I) Ineligible; Injured; Redshirt
Source and player details:

=== Depth chart ===
Starters and backups.

Defense

FS
Jarrius Wallace
Rhedi Short
Isaiah Mays

BUCK	WILL	MIKE	SAM
Jalen Harris	Anthony Pandy	Derick Mourning	Kwabena Watson
Issaiah Johnson	Derrion Clark	Parker Henley	Rourke Freeburg
⋅	–	–	–

SS
Jaxen Turner
Christian Young
⋅

CB
Christian Roland-Wallace
Malik Hausman
McKenzie Barnes

DE	NT	DE
Jalen Harris	Roy Lopez	Aaron Blackwell
Issaiah Johnson	Myles Tapusoa	Trevon Mason
–	Regen Terry	Paris Shand

CB
Lorenzo Burns
Bobby Wolfe
–

Offense

WR
Jalen "Boobie" Curry
Drew Dixon
Stanley Berryhill

WR
Brian Casteel
Ma’jon Wright
Thomas Reid III

LT	LG	C	RG	RT
Jordan Morgan	Donovan Laie	Josh McCauley	Robert Congel	Paiton Fears
Sam Langi	Tyson Gardner	Steven Bailey	Josh Donovan	David Watson
–	–	–	–	–

TE
Bryce Wolma
Stacey Marshall
Zach Williams

WR
Jamarye Joiner
Tayvian Cunningham
Dyelan Miller

QB
Grant Gunnell
Rhett Rodriguez
Kevin Doyle
or
Will Plummer

Key reserves
Offense
Defense
Out (Suspension)
Out (season)
Out (mission)
Out (Transfer)

RB
Gary Brightwell
Michael Wiley
Nathan Tilford
or
Jalen John

Special teams
PK Lucas Havrisik
PK Tyler Loop
P Kyle Ostendorp
P Tyler Loop
KR Gary Brightwell
Jamarye Joiner
Stanley Berryhill
PR Brian Casteel
Christian Roland-Wallace
Michael Wiley
LS Seth MacKeller
Kameron Hawkins
H Jacob Meeker-Hackett
Kyle Ostendorp

Depth Chart Source: 2020 Arizona Wildcats Football Fact Book

True Freshman
Double Position : *

== Schedule ==
=== Spring game ===
The 2020 Wildcats began spring practice on March 2, 2020 and finish with the 2020 Arizona spring game. The remainder of spring practice and the spring game were canceled on March 18, 2020, due to the ongoing Coronavirus pandemic.

=== Regular season ===
Arizona had scheduled non–conference games against Hawaii, Portland State, and Texas Tech but canceled these games on July 10 due to the Pac-12 Conference's decision to play a conference-only schedule due to the COVID-19 pandemic.

Original 2020 Arizona Wildcats schedule
Date	Opponent	Site
August 29	Hawaii*	Arizona Stadium • Tucson, AZ
September 5	Portland State*	Arizona Stadium • Tucson, AZ
September 12	Stanford	Arizona Stadium • Tucson, AZ
September 19	at Texas Tech*	Jones AT&T Stadium • Lubbock, TX
October 3	at UCLA	Rose Bowl • Pasadena, CA
October 9	Colorado	Arizona Stadium • Tucson, AZ
October 17	USC	Arizona Stadium • Tucson, AZ
October 23	at Washington	Husky Stadium • Seattle, WA
October 31	Oregon	Arizona Stadium • Tucson, AZ
November 7	at Utah	Rice–Eccles Stadium • Salt Lake City, UT
November 21	at Oregon State	Reser Stadium • Corvallis, OR
November 28	Arizona State	Arizona Stadium • Tucson, AZ (Territorial Cup)

Date	Time	Opponent	Site	TV	Result	Attendance
~~November 7~~	~~12:30 p.m.~~	at ~~Utah~~	~~Rice-Eccles Stadium~~; ~~Salt Lake City, UT~~	~~ESPN2~~	No contest	
November 14	1:30 p.m.	No. 20 USC	Arizona Stadium; Tucson, AZ	FOX	L 30–34	0
November 21	6:00 p.m.	at Washington	Husky Stadium; Seattle, WA	FOX	L 27–44	253
November 28	6:00 p.m.	at UCLA	Rose Bowl; Pasadena, CA	FOX	L 10–27	0
December 5	5:00 p.m.	Colorado	Arizona Stadium; Tucson, AZ	FS1	L 13–24	
December 11	5:00 p.m.	Arizona State	Arizona Stadium; Tucson, AZ (Territorial Cup)	ESPN	L 7–70	0
~~December 19~~		at ~~California~~	~~California Memorial Stadium~~; ~~Berkeley, CA~~		No contest	
Rankings from AP Poll released prior to the game; All times are in Mountain time

== Game summaries ==
=== vs No. 20 USC ===
No. 20 USC Trojans (0–0) vs Arizona Wildcats (0–0) – Game summary

Quarter	1	2	3	4	Total
#20 Trojans	10	7	3	14	34
Wildcats	7	6	7	10	30

at Arizona Stadium • Tucson, AZ

- Date: November 14, 2020
- Game time: 1:30 p.m.
- Game weather: Sunny, 73 °F (23 °C)
- Game attendance: 0
- Referee: Matthew Richards
- TV announcers (Fox): Gus Johnson (play-by-play), Joel Klatt (analyst), Jenny Taft (sideline reporter)

Game information

First quarter

- (12:36) USC – Markese Stepp 1-yard run, Parker Lewis kick (Drive: 6 plays, 17 yards, 1:31; USC 7–0)
- (8:50) ARIZ – Jamarye Joiner 34-yard pass from Grant Gunnell, Lucas Havrisik kick (Drive: 10 plays, 75 yards, 3:46; Tied 7–7)
- (2:04) USC – Parker Lewis 30-yard field goal (Drive: 15 plays, 62 yards, 6:46; USC 10–7)

Second quarter

- (5:07) ARIZ – Lucas Havrisik 25-yard field goal (Drive: 13 plays, 88 yards, 5:15; Tied 10–10)
- (2:33) USC – Stephen Carr 3-yard run, Parker Lewis kick (Drive: 7 plays, 75 yards, 2:34; USC 17–10)
- (0:12) ARIZ – Lucas Havrisik 32-yard field goal (Drive: 9 plays, 57 yards, 2:15; USC 17–13)

Third quarter

- (9:57) USC – Parker Lewis 28-yard field goal (Drive: 5 plays, 47 yards, 0:54; USC 20–13)
- (9:45) ARIZ – Tayvian Cunningham 75-yard pass from Grant Gunnell, Lucas Havrisik kick (Drive: 1 play, 75 yards, 0:12; Tied 20–20)

Fourth quarter

- (7:49) ARIZ – Lucas Havrisik 51-yard field goal (Drive: 10 plays, 45 yards, 4:35; Arizona 23–20)
- (3:30) USC – Erik Krommenhoek 6-yard pass from Kedon Slovis, Parker Lewis kick (Drive: 11 plays, 75 yards, 4:19; USC 27–23)
- (1:35) ARIZ – Stanley Berryhill III 6-yard pass from Grant Gunnell, Lucas Havrisik kick (Drive: 8 plays, 65 yards, 1:55; Arizona 30–27)
- (0:25) USC – Vavae Malepeai 8-yard run, Parker Lewis kick (Drive: 6 plays, 75 yards, 1:10; USC 34–30)

Statistics	USC	ARIZ
First downs	26	26
Total yards	498	444
Rushing yards	32–173	40–158
Passing yards	325	286
Passing: Comp–Att–Int	30–43–0	24–36–1
Time of possession	29:56	30:04

Team	Category	Player	Statistics
USC	Passing	Kedon Slovis	30/43, 325 yards, TD
USC	Rushing	Markese Stepp	12 carries, 82 yards, TD
USC	Receiving	Amon-Ra St. Brown	7 receptions, 113 yards
Arizona	Passing	Grant Gunnell	24/36, 286 yards, 3 TD, INT
Arizona	Rushing	Gary Brightwell	21 carries, 112 yards
Arizona	Receiving	Tayvian Cunningham	5 receptions, 110 yards, TD

=== at Washington ===
Arizona Wildcats (0–1) at Washington Huskies (1–0) – Game summary

Quarter	1	2	3	4	Total
Wildcats	0	0	0	27	27
Huskies	17	7	13	7	44

at Husky Stadium • Seattle, WA

- Date: November 21, 2020
- Game time: 6:00 p.m.
- Game weather: Clear, 50 °F (10 °C)
- Game attendance: 253
- Referee: Francisco Villar
- TV announcers (Fox): Joe Davis (play-by-play), Mark Helfrich (analyst)

Game information

First quarter

- (11:27) WASH – Puka Nacua 65-yard pass from Dylan Morris, Peyton Henry kick (Drive: 7 plays, 78 yards, 3:33; Washington 7–0)
- (4:58) WASH – Peyton Henry 20-yard field goal (Drive: 10 plays, 77 yards, 5:20; Washington 10–0)
- (2:48) WASH – Sean McGrew 1-yard run, Peyton Henry kick (Drive: 2 plays, 9 yards, 0:43; Washington 17–0)

Second quarter

- (8:49) WASH – Richard Newton 2-yard run, Peyton Henry kick (Drive: 13 plays, 65 yards, 6:39; Washington 24–0)

Third quarter

- (10:31) WASH – Kamari Pleasant 21-yard run, two-point run failed (Drive: 5 plays, 51 yards, 2:35; Washington 30–0)
- (5:02) WASH – Cade Otton 20-yard pass from Dylan Morris, Peyton Henry kick (Drive: 7 plays, 47 yards, 3:11; Washington 37–0)

Fourth quarter

- (12:54) ARIZ – Stanley Berryhill III 30-yard pass from Grant Gunnell, kick failed (Drive: 10 plays, 71 yards, 3:04; Washington 37–6)
- (11:34) WASH – Richard Newton 54-yard run, Peyton Henry kick (Drive: 3 plays, 65 yards, 1:20; Washington 44–6)
- (9:28) ARIZ – Ma'Jon Wright 11-yard pass from Grant Gunnell, Lucas Havrisik kick (Drive: 8 plays, 75 yards, 2:06; Washington 44–13)
- (4:54) ARIZ – Michael Wiley 3-yard run, Lucas Havrisik kick (Drive: 8 plays, 80 yards, 2:14; Washington 44–20)
- (0:33) ARIZ – Stanley Berryhill III 24-yard pass from Grant Gunnell, Lucas Havrisik kick (Drive: 6 plays, 75 yards, 1:56; Washington 44–27)

Statistics	ARIZ	WASH
First downs	22	24
Total yards	331	472
Rushing yards	26–72	45–233
Passing yards	259	239
Passing: Comp–Att–Int	27–39–0	16–26–0
Time of possession	22:43	37:17

Team	Category	Player	Statistics
Arizona	Passing	Grant Gunnell	27/39, 259 yards, 3 TD
Arizona	Rushing	Gary Brightwell	11 carries, 55 yards
Arizona	Receiving	Stanley Berryhill III	5 receptions, 65 yards, 2 TD
Washington	Passing	Dylan Morris	15/25, 230 yards, 2 TD
Washington	Rushing	Richard Newton	8 carries, 81 yards, 2 TD
Washington	Receiving	Cade Otton	7 receptions, 100 yards, TD

=== at UCLA ===
Arizona Wildcats (0–2) at UCLA Bruins (1–2) – Game summary

Quarter	1	2	3	4	Total
Wildcats	7	0	3	0	10
Bruins	3	17	0	7	27

at Rose Bowl • Pasadena, CA

- Date: November 28, 2020
- Game time: 6:00 p.m.
- Game weather: Clear, 64 °F (18 °C)
- Game attendance: 0
- Referee: Mike McCabe
- TV announcers (Fox): Aaron Goldsmith (play-by-play), Brady Quinn (analyst)

Game information

First quarter

- (10:05) ARIZ – Michael Wiley 3-yard run, Lucas Havrisik kick (Drive: 4 plays, 22 yards, 1:24; Arizona 7–0)
- (5:34) UCLA – Nicholas Barr-Mira 31-yard field goal (Drive: 10 plays, 62 yards, 4:31; Arizona 7–3)

Second quarter

- (11:58) UCLA – Brittain Brown 16-yard pass from Chase Griffin, Nicholas Barr-Mira kick (Drive: 9 plays, 52 yards, 2:50; UCLA 10–7)
- (8:23) UCLA – Demetric Felton 1-yard run, Nicholas Barr-Mira kick (Drive: 6 plays, 43 yards, 2:09; UCLA 17–7)
- (0:10) UCLA – Nicholas Barr-Mira 30-yard field goal (Drive: 13 plays, 81 yards, 4:11; UCLA 20–7)

Third quarter

- (1:15) ARIZ – Lucas Havrisik 26-yard field goal (Drive: 11 plays, 65 yards, 3:16; UCLA 20–10)

Fourth quarter

- (1:38) UCLA – Brittain Brown 2-yard run, Nicholas Barr-Mira kick (Drive: 5 plays, 30 yards, 1:44; UCLA 27–10)

Statistics	ARIZ	UCLA
First downs	17	23
Total yards	300	410
Rushing yards	39–147	56–281
Passing yards	153	129
Passing: Comp–Att–Int	18–36–2	12–20–0
Time of possession	28:29	31:31

Team	Category	Player	Statistics
Arizona	Passing	Will Plummer	17/35, 151 yards, 2 INT
Arizona	Rushing	Gary Brightwell	17 carries, 57 yards
Arizona	Receiving	Stanley Berryhill III	5 receptions, 58 yards
UCLA	Passing	Chase Griffin	12/20, 129 yards, TD
UCLA	Rushing	Demetric Felton	32 carries, 206 yards, TD
UCLA	Receiving	Kyle Phillips	3 receptions, 40 yards

=== vs Colorado ===
Colorado Buffaloes (3–0) vs Arizona Wildcats (0–3) – Game summary

Quarter	1	2	3	4	Total
Buffaloes	0	14	7	3	24
Wildcats	10	3	0	0	13

at Arizona Stadium • Tucson, AZ

- Date: December 5, 2020
- Game time: 5:00 p.m.
- Game weather: Clear skies, 63 °F (17 °C)
- Game attendance: 0
- Referee: Matthew Richards
- TV announcers (FS1): Alex Faust (play-by-play), Evan Moore (analyst)

Game information

First quarter

- (10:26) ARIZ – Gary Brightwell 26-yard run, Lucas Havrisik kick (Drive: 5 plays, 40 yards, 1:20; Arizona 7–0)
- (4:37) ARIZ – Lucas Havrisik 38-yard field goal (Drive: 7 plays, 75 yards, 3:04; Arizona 10–0)

Second quarter

- (13:36) ARIZ – Lucas Havrisik 42-yard field goal (Drive: 6 plays, 29 yards, 2:53; Arizona 13–0)
- (6:38) COLO – Ashaad Clayton 1-yard run, Evan Price kick (Drive: 4 plays, 95 yards, 1:46; Arizona 13–7)
- (3:00) COLO – Ashaad Clayton 4-yard run, Evan Price kick (Drive: 5 plays, 78 yards, 1:41; Colorado 14–13)

Third quarter

- (9:22) COLO – Sam Noyer 2-yard run, Evan Price kick (Drive: 8 plays, 80 yards, 3:37; Colorado 21–13)

Fourth quarter

- (2:26) COLO – Evan Price 19-yard field goal (Drive: 9 plays, 94 yards, 3:41; Colorado 24–13)

Statistics	COLO	ARIZ
First downs	18	23
Total yards	499	422
Rushing yards	46–407	43–268
Passing yards	92	154
Passing: Comp–Att–Int	12–20–2	19–32–1
Time of possession	29:03	30:57

Team	Category	Player	Statistics
Colorado	Passing	Sam Noyer	12/19, 92 yards, 2 INT
Colorado	Rushing	Jarek Broussard	25 carries, 301 yards
Colorado	Receiving	Dimitri Stanley	2 receptions, 44 yards
Arizona	Passing	Will Plummer	19/32, 154 yards, INT
Arizona	Rushing	Michael Wiley	7 carries, 122 yards
Arizona	Receiving	Brian Casteel	3 receptions, 71 yards

=== vs Arizona State ===
Arizona State Sun Devils (0–2) vs Arizona Wildcats (0–4) – Game summary

Quarter	1	2	3	4	Total
Sun Devils	21	21	21	7	70
Wildcats	0	7	0	0	7

at Arizona Stadium • Tucson, AZ

- Date: December 11, 2020
- Game time: 5:00 p.m.
- Game weather: Mostly clear, 62 °F (17 °C)
- Game attendance: 0
- Referee: Michael Mothershed
- TV announcers (ESPN): Jason Benetti (play-by-play) Andre Ware (analyst), Stormy Buonantony (sideline reporter)

Game information

First quarter

- (14:47) ASU – D.J. Taylor 100-yard kickoff return, Christian Zendejas kick (Arizona State 7–0)
- (14:04) ASU – Chip Trayanum 4-yard run, Christian Zendejas kick (Drive: 1 play, 4 yards, 0:05; Arizona State 14–0)
- (2:21) ASU – Jayden Daniels 20-yard run, Jack Luckhurst kick (Drive: 6 plays, 41 yards, 3:08; Arizona State 21–0)

Second quarter

- (11:45) ASU – Rachaad White 93-yard run, Jack Luckhurst kick (Drive: 2 plays, 96 yards, 0:59; Arizona State 28–0)
- (10:15) ASU – Ricky Pearsall 31-yard pass from Jayden Daniels, Jack Luckhurst kick (Drive: 2 plays, 26 yards, 1:15; Arizona State 35–0)
- (5:25) ASU – Daniyel Ngata 3-yard run, Jack Luckhurst kick (Drive: 5 plays, 36 yards, 2:05; Arizona State 42–0)
- (3:38) ARIZ – Michael Wiley 20-yard run, Lucas Havrisik kick (Drive: 5 plays, 75 yards, 1:47; Arizona State 42–7)

Third quarter

- (10:28) ASU – Rachaad White 2-yard run, Jack Luckhurst kick (Drive: 6 plays, 55 yards, 3:04; Arizona State 49–7)
- (6:29) ASU – Rachaad White 1-yard run, Jack Luckhurst kick (Drive: 7 plays, 30 yards, 3:28; Arizona State 56–7)
- (4:00) ASU – Curtis Hodges 74-yard pass from Jayden Daniels, Jack Luckhurst kick (Drive: 2 plays, 73 yards, 0:52; Arizona State 63–7)

Fourth quarter

- (7:02) ASU – Jackson He 1-yard run, Jack Luckhurst kick (Drive: 7 plays, 43 yards, 4:01; Arizona State 70–7)

Statistics	ASU	ARIZ
First downs	17	18
Total yards	486	350
Rushing yards	50–259	36–137
Passing yards	227	213
Passing: Comp–Att–Int	10–13–0	26–46–3
Time of possession	31:01	27:53

Team	Category	Player	Statistics
Arizona State	Passing	Jayden Daniels	9/11, 203 yards, 2 TD
Arizona State	Rushing	Rachaad White	10 carries, 133 yards. 3 TD
Arizona State	Receiving	Curtis Hodges	1 reception, 74 yards, TD
Arizona	Passing	Will Plummer	7/13, 83 yards
Arizona	Rushing	Gary Brightwell	17 carries, 49 yards
Arizona	Receiving	Ma'Jon Wright	8 receptions, 85 yards

Arizona committed seven turnovers as Arizona State scored 70 points, the most points scored in the history of the Territorial Cup. The Wildcats used three different quarterbacks in the game, none of which broke 100 yards passing; Will Plummer finished 7-of-13 for 83 yards, Grant Gunnell went 12-of-17 for 78 yards with one interception and one lost fumble, and Rhett Rodriguez finished 7-of-16 for 52 yards with two interceptions. Running back Gary Brightwell lost three fumbles. The defeat was so devastating that head coach Kevin Sumlin was fired the following day.

== Statistics ==
=== Scores by quarter ===
	1	2	3	4	Total
Opponents	51	66	44	38	199
Arizona	24	16	10	37	87

== Players drafted into the NFL ==
Round	Pick	Player	Position	NFL club
6	195	Roy Lopez	DT	Houston Texans
6	196	Gary Brightwell	RB	New York Giants

== Media affiliates ==
=== Radio ===
- ESPN Radio – (ESPN Tucson 1490 AM & 104.09 FM) – Nationwide (Dish Network, Sirius XM, TuneIn radio and iHeartRadio)
- KCUB 1290 AM – Football Radio Show – (Tucson, AZ)
- KHYT – 107.5 FM (Tucson, AZ)
- KTKT 990 AM – La Hora de Los Gatos (Spanish) – (Tucson, AZ)
- KGME 910 AM – (IMG Sports Network) – (Phoenix, AZ)
- KTAN 1420 AM – (Sierra Vista, AZ)
- KDAP 96.5 FM (Douglas, Arizona)
- KWRQ 102.3 FM – (Safford, AZ/Thatcher, AZ)
- KIKO 1340 AM – (Globe, AZ)
- KVWM 970 AM – (Show Low, AZ/Pinetop-Lakeside, AZ)
- XENY 760 – (Nogales, Sonora) (Spanish)

=== TV ===
- CBS Family – KOLD (CBS), CBSN
- ABC/ESPN Family – KGUN (ABC), ABC, ESPN, ESPN2, ESPNU, ESPN+,
- FOX Family – KMSB (FOX), FOX/FS1, FSN
- Pac-12 Network (Pac-12 Arizona)
- NBC – KVOA, NBC Sports, NBCSN
