= KVWM =

Coordinates: 34°12′40.2″N 110°00′22.4″W

- Show Low, Arizona; United States
- Broadcast area: White Mountains (Arizona)
- Frequency: 970 (kHz)
- Branding: NewsTalk 970

Programming
- Format: Talk radio

Ownership
- Owner: Petracom of Holbrook, LLC

History
- First air date: May 17, 1957
- Call sign meaning: Voice of the White Mountains

Technical information
- Licensing authority: FCC
- Class: D
- Power: 5,000 watts day 195 watts night

Links
- Public license information: Public file; LMS
- Webcast: Listen Live
- Website: 970kvwm.com

KVWM is a commercial talk radio station in Show Low, Arizona, broadcasting on 970 AM and owned by Petracom of Holbrook, LLC (a subsidiary of Petracom Media).

== History ==
The first words on KVWM were spoken by station founder "Woody" Woodworth, on May 17, 1957. The station was originally an Easy Listening station, and later changed to an Oldies format. In 2004, the Oldies format was moved to another Petracom station, KSNX, and KVWM began simulcasting the NewsTalk format that is still carried on the station today.
