= Jordan Morgan (American football, born 2001) =

American football player (born 2001)

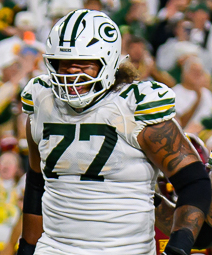
- Morgan with the Green Bay Packers in 2025

No. 77 – Green Bay Packers
- Position: Offensive tackle
- Roster status: Active

Personal information
- Born: August 4, 2001 (age 25); Tucson, Arizona, U.S.
- Listed height: 6 ft 5 in (1.96 m)
- Listed weight: 311 lb (141 kg)

Career information
- High school: Marana (Marana)
- College: Arizona (2019–2023)
- NFL draft: 2024: 1st round, 25th overall pick

Career history
- Green Bay Packers (2024–present)

Awards and highlights
- First-team All-Pac-12 (2023)

Career NFL statistics as of Week 10, 2026
- Games played: 33
- Games started: 23
- Stats at Pro Football Reference

Jordan Morgan (born August 4, 2001) is an American professional football offensive tackle for the Green Bay Packers of the National Football League (NFL). He played college football for the Arizona Wildcats and was selected by the Packers in the first round of the 2024 NFL draft.

== Early life ==
Morgan was born on August 4, 2001, in Tucson, Arizona. He attended Marana High School, where he played on both sides of the line for the football team. Morgan committed to play college football at the University of Arizona.

== College career ==
In Morgan's first two seasons he played in eight games, while starting in four of them. Morgan was named the Wildcats' starting left tackle going into his third season and started the final 11 games after missing the season opener due to injury. In 2022 Morgan started ten games and was named first-team all Pac-12 by the Associated Press, and an honorable mention by the Pac-12. After thinking about entering the 2023 NFL draft, Morgan returned to Arizona for the 2023 season. Morgan was named preseason second team all-Pac-12 ahead of the 2023 season. Morgan was also named to the watchlists of the Outland Trophy and the Wuerffel Trophy.

== Professional career ==
Pre-draft measurables
Height	Weight	Arm length	Hand span	Wingspan	40-yard dash	10-yard split	20-yard split	Vertical jump	Broad jump	Bench press
6 ft 5 in (1.96 m)	311 lb (141 kg)	32 7/8 in (0.84 m)	10 7/8 in (0.28 m)	6 ft 9 3/8 in (2.07 m)	5.04 s	1.70 s	2.88 s	28.0 in (0.71 m)	9 ft 2 in (2.79 m)	27 reps
All values from NFL Combine/Pro Day

Morgan was selected by the Green Bay Packers with the 25th overall pick in the 2024 NFL draft. On June 13, 2024, he signed his rookie contract. On November 16, the Packers placed Morgan on injured reserve.

Morgan entered the 2025 season as a backup after losing the starting left tackle job to Rasheed Walker.
