= Stanley Berryhill III =

American gridiron football player (born 1998)

- Berryhill with the BC Lions in 2026

No. 83 – BC Lions
- Position: Wide receiver / Return specialist
- Roster status: Active
- CFL status: American

Personal information
- Born: June 9, 1998 (age 28); Tucson, Arizona, U.S.
- Listed height: 5 ft 10 in (1.78 m)
- Listed weight: 190 lb (86 kg)

Career information
- High school: Orange Lutheran (Orange, California)
- College: Arizona
- NFL draft: 2022: undrafted

Career history
- Atlanta Falcons (2022)*; Arizona Cardinals (2022)*; Detroit Lions (2022); Houston Roughnecks (2024)*; BC Lions (2024–present)
- * Offseason or practice squad member only

Awards and highlights
- First-team All-Pac-12 (2021)
- Stats at Pro Football Reference

Stanley Berryhill III (born June 8, 1998) is an American professional football wide receiver and return specialist for the BC Lions of the Canadian Football League (CFL). He played college football at Arizona.

== Professional career ==
Pre-draft measurables
Height	Weight	Arm length	Hand span	Wingspan	40-yard dash	10-yard split	20-yard split	20-yard shuttle	Three-cone drill	Vertical jump	Broad jump	Bench press
5 ft 9 3/4 in (1.77 m)	182 lb (83 kg)	30 1/4 in (0.77 m)	8 1/4 in (0.21 m)	6 ft 0 in (1.83 m)	4.46 s	1.54 s	2.57 s	4.41 s	7.25 s	37.0 in (0.94 m)	10 ft 2 in (3.10 m)	14 reps
All values from Pro Day

=== Atlanta Falcons ===
On May 2, 2022, Berryhill III signed with the Atlanta Falcons as an undrafted free agent. He was waived by the Falcons on August 30.

=== Arizona Cardinals ===
On September 20, 2022, Berryhill III signed with the practice squad of the Arizona Cardinals. He was released off the practice squad on October 18.

=== Detroit Lions ===
On October 19, 2022, Berryhill III signed with the practice squad of the Detroit Lions. He was elevated to the active roster on October 27, and then reverted to the practice squad after the game. Berryhill was signed to the active roster on November 5, then was waived and re-signed to the practice squad.

Berryhill signed a reserve/future contract with the Lions on January 9, 2023. On April 21, Berryhill was suspended six games for violating the league’s gambling policy after betting on college football games at the Lions' facility. He was released by Detroit on May 10. After the league adjusted its gambling policy for players, Berryhill's suspension was reduced to four games and was reinstated on October 3.

=== Houston Roughnecks ===
On December 12, 2023, Berryhill signed with the Houston Roughnecks of the XFL. The Roughnecks brand was transferred to the Houston Gamblers when the XFL and United States Football League merged to create the United Football League (UFL).

=== BC Lions ===
Berryhill signed with the BC Lions of the Canadian Football League on January 16, 2024. On June 2, Berryhill was re-assigned to the Practice Squad. He rejoined the active roster on June 20.

On June 19, 2025, Berryhill was placed on the Lions' one-game injured list. He rejoined the active roster on July 4. On June 18, 2026, Berryhill was placed on the Lions' six-game injured list. He rejoined the active roster on August 12. On October 22, 2026, Berryhill III was again placed on the Lions' 1-game injured list. He rejoined the active roster on October 30, 2026, ahead of the Western Semi-Final.
