= Joshua Donovan =

American gridiron football player (born 1999)

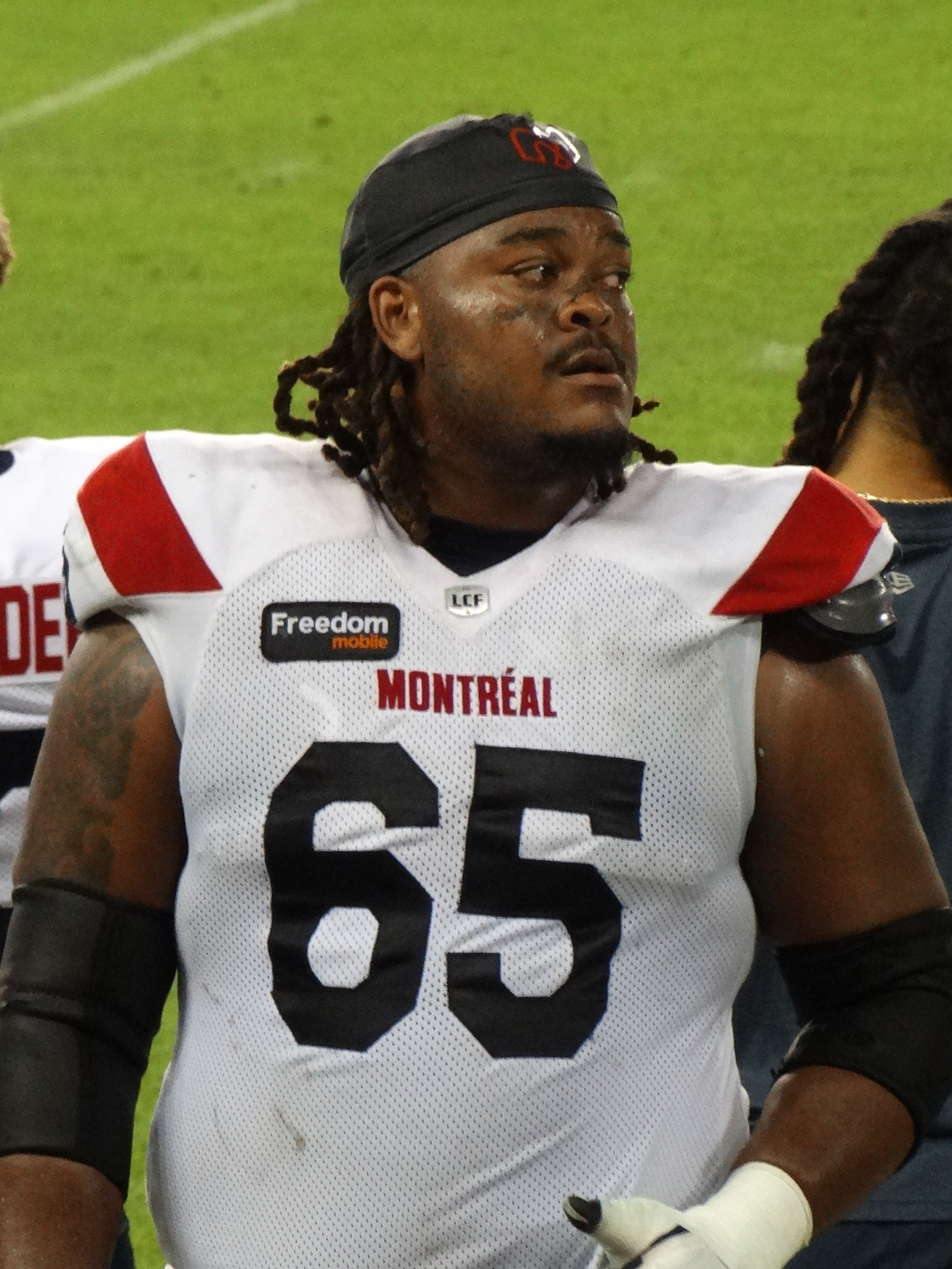
- Donovan with the Montreal Alouettes in 2024

No. 65 – BC Lions
- Position: Offensive tackle
- Roster status: Active
- CFL status: American

Personal information
- Born: July 2, 1999 (age 27); College Station, Texas, U. S.
- Listed height: 6 ft 6 in (1.98 m)
- Listed weight: 330 lb (150 kg)

Career information
- High school: College Station High
- College: Trinity Valley CC (2017–2018); Arizona (2019–2022)

Career history
- 2023–2024: Montreal Alouettes
- 2025: Toronto Argonauts
- 2026–present: BC Lions

Awards and highlights
- Grey Cup champion (2023)
- Stats at CFL.ca

Joshua Donovan (born July 2, 1999) is an American professional football offensive tackle for the BC Lions of the Canadian Football League (CFL). He played college football for the Arizona Wildcats.

== College career ==
Donovan played college football for the Arizona Wildcats from 2019 to 2022.

== Professional career ==
Pre-draft measurables
Height	Weight	Arm length	Hand span	Wingspan	40-yard dash	10-yard split	20-yard split	20-yard shuttle	Three-cone drill	Bench press
6 ft 4 5/8 in (1.95 m)	312 lb (142 kg)	33 1/8 in (0.84 m)	9 1/2 in (0.24 m)	6 ft 7 1/2 in (2.02 m)	5.48 s	1.99 s	3.20 s	5.22 s	8.21 s	20 reps
All values from Pro Day

=== Montreal Alouettes ===
On July 24, 2023, it was announced that Donovan had been signed by the Montreal Alouettes. He spent the 2023 season on the practice roster and remained there as the Alouettes won the 110th Grey Cup.

After becoming a free agent after the 2023 season, Donovan re-signed with the Alouettes to a two-year contract on December 15, 2023. With the team's incumbent right tackle, Jamar McGloster, beginning the season on the injured list, Donovan made his professional debut in week 1 of the 2024 season on June 6, 2024, against the Winnipeg Blue Bombers. He played and started in 17 regular season games in 2024. Donovan was with the team in training camp in 2025, but was part of the final cuts on May 31, 2025.

=== Toronto Argonauts ===
On September 15, 2025, it was announced that Donovan had agreed to a practice roster agreement with the Toronto Argonauts.

On May 13, 2026, Donovan was released by the Argonauts.

=== BC Lions ===
On May 18, 2026, Donovan signed with the BC Lions. On June 12, 2026, Donovan was placed on the Lions' 6-game injured list to start the 2026 CFL season. He rejoined the active roster on June 26. On July 3, 2026, Donovan was placed on the Lions' reserve roster. He rejoined the active roster on July 24, 2026. On July 30, 2026, Donovan was again placed on the Lions' 6-game injured list and he remained there to end the 2026 CFL season.
