= Christian Roland-Wallace =

American football player (born 2001)

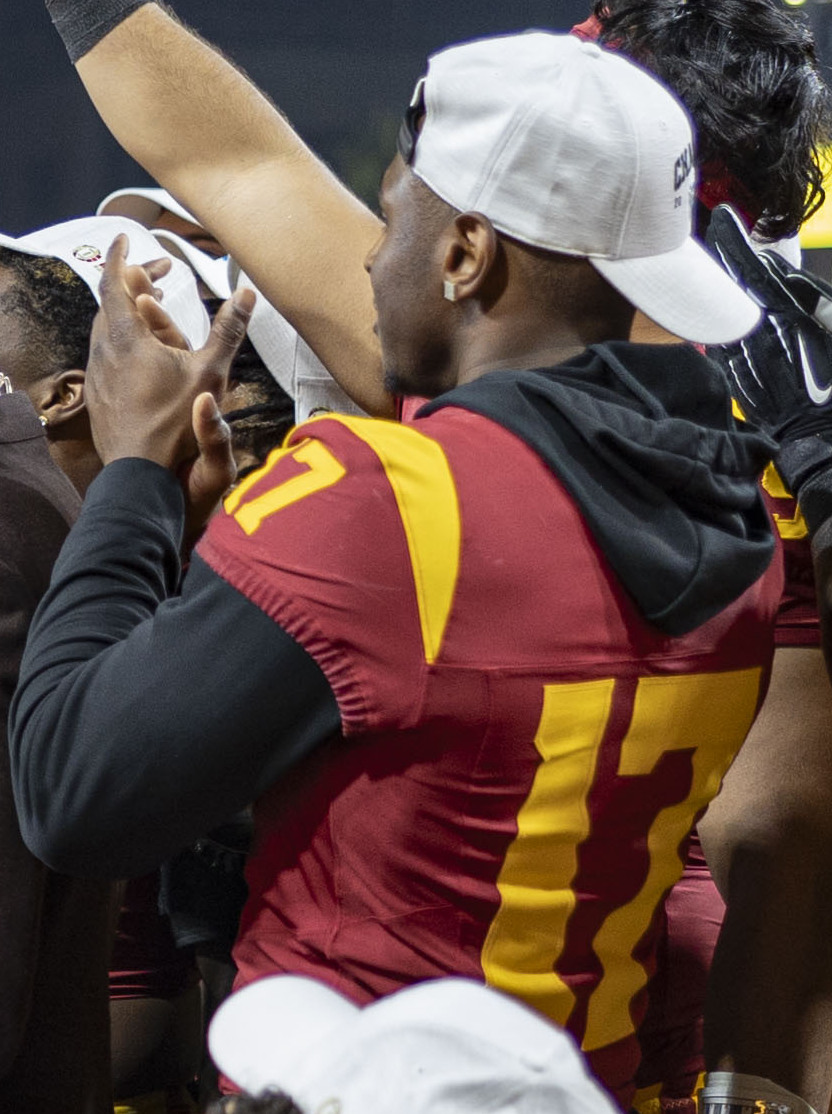
- Roland-Wallace in 2023

No. 30 – Kansas City Chiefs
- Position: Cornerback
- Roster status: Active

Personal information
- Born: November 23, 2001 (age 24); Palmdale, California, U.S.
- Listed height: 5 ft 11 in (1.80 m)
- Listed weight: 202 lb (92 kg)

Career information
- High school: Knight (Palmdale, California)
- College: Arizona (2019–2022); USC (2023)
- NFL draft: 2024: undrafted

Career history
- Kansas City Chiefs (2024–present)

Career NFL statistics as of Week 8, 2025
- Total tackles: 51
- Forced fumbles: 1
- Pass deflections: 2
- Interceptions: 2
- Stats at Pro Football Reference

Christian Roland-Wallace (born November 23, 2001) is an American professional football cornerback for the Kansas City Chiefs of the National Football League (NFL). He played college football for the Arizona Wildcats and USC Trojans.

== Early life ==
Coming out of high school, Roland-Wallace was rated as a three star recruit where he decided to commit to play college football for the Arizona Wildcats.

== College career ==
=== Arizona ===
During Roland-Wallace's freshman season in 2019 he played in all 12 games, where he tallied 37 tackles, four pass deflections, and an interception. In the 2020 season, Roland-Wallace finished the season with 26 tackles and three pass deflections. During the 2021 season, Roland-Wallace would breakout, notching 48 tackles with three being for a loss, a sack and a half, two pass deflections, and an interception. During the 2022 season, Roland-Wallace started all 12 games for Arizona where he notched 58 tackles, six pass deflections, and two forced fumbles. After the conclusion of the 2022 season, Roland-Wallace decided to enter his name into the NCAA transfer portal. During his time at Arizona, Roland-Wallace played in 41 games with 37 starts where he totaled 169 tackles, 18 pass deflections, two interceptions, and two forced fumbles.

=== USC ===
Roland-Wallace decided to transfer to play for the USC Trojans. Roland-Wallace finished his one season at USC, recording 37 tackles, nine pass deflections, and two interceptions. After the conclusion of the 2023 season, Roland-Wallace declared for the 2024 NFL draft, and was invited to participate in the 2024 East-West Shrine Bowl.

== Professional career ==
Pre-draft measurables
Height	Weight	Arm length	Hand span	Wingspan	40-yard dash	10-yard split	20-yard split	20-yard shuttle	Three-cone drill	Vertical jump	Broad jump	Bench press
5 ft 11 1/2 in (1.82 m)	201 lb (91 kg)	32 1/2 in (0.83 m)	9 in (0.23 m)	6 ft 5 in (1.96 m)	4.64 s	1.60 s	2.67 s	4.52 s	7.16 s	37.5 in (0.95 m)	9 ft 11 in (3.02 m)	17 reps
All values from NFL Combine/Pro Day

Roland-Wallace was signed by the Kansas City Chiefs as an undrafted free agent after the 2024 NFL draft. Roland-Wallace, a UDFA, was among the 53 players included on the Chiefs' initial Week 1 roster.

Roland-Wallace began the 2025 season as one of Kansas City's reserve defensive backs, recording one interception, three pass deflections, and 34 combined tackles across 11 appearances (two starts). On December 6, 2025, Rolland-Wallace was placed on injured reserve due to a back injury.
