= Jace Whittaker =

American football player (born 1995)

Profile
- Position: Cornerback

Personal information
- Born: July 16, 1995 (age 31); Oceanside, California, U.S.
- Listed height: 5 ft 11 in (1.80 m)
- Listed weight: 185 lb (84 kg)

Career information
- High school: Oceanside (Oceanside)
- College: Arizona (2015–2019)
- NFL draft: 2020: undrafted

Career history
- Arizona Cardinals (2020–2022); Washington Commanders (2023)*
- * Offseason or practice squad member only

Career NFL statistics
- Total tackles: 31
- Pass deflections: 3
- Stats at Pro Football Reference

Jace Whittaker (born July 16, 1995) is an American professional football cornerback. He played college football at Arizona and was signed by the Arizona Cardinals as an undrafted free agent in 2020.

== Professional career ==
Pre-draft measurables
Height	Weight	Arm length	Hand span
5 ft 10 1/4 in (1.78 m)	189 lb (86 kg)	29 in (0.74 m)	9 in (0.23 m)
All values from Pro Day

=== Arizona Cardinals ===
Whittaker signed with the Arizona Cardinals as an undrafted free agent following the 2020 NFL draft on April 27, 2020. He was waived during final roster cuts on September 5, 2020, and signed to the team's practice squad the next day. He was elevated to the active roster on October 3, November 7, November 14, and January 2, 2021, for the team's weeks 4, 9, 10, 12, and 17 games against the Carolina Panthers, Miami Dolphins, Buffalo Bills, New England Patriots, and Los Angeles Rams, and reverted to the practice squad after each game. He signed a reserve/future contract on January 5, 2021.

On August 31, 2021, Whittaker was waived by the Cardinals and re-signed to the practice squad the next day. He signed a reserve/future contract with the Cardinals on January 19, 2022.

On August 30, 2022, Whittaker was waived by the Cardinals and signed to the practice squad the next day. He was released on November 9. He was re-signed to the active roster on December 14.

=== Washington Commanders ===
On August 5, 2023, Whittaker signed with the Washington Commanders. He was waived on August 29. He was re-signed to the practice squad on January 2, 2024. He became a free agent when his practice squad contract expired after the season.
