= Gary Brightwell =

American football player (born 1999)

Profile
- Position: Running back

Personal information
- Born: February 28, 1999 (age 27); Chester, Pennsylvania, U.S.
- Listed height: 6 ft 1 in (1.85 m)
- Listed weight: 218 lb (99 kg)

Career information
- High school: Saint Frances Academy (Baltimore, Maryland)
- College: Arizona (2017–2020)
- NFL draft: 2021: 6th round, 196th overall pick

Career history
- New York Giants (2021–2023); Jacksonville Jaguars (2024)*; Cleveland Browns (2024); Cincinnati Bengals (2024–2025)*
- * Offseason or practice squad member only

Career NFL statistics as of 2025
- Rushing attempts: 41
- Rushing yards: 164
- Rushing touchdowns: 1
- Receptions: 11
- Receiving yards: 92
- Return yards: 674
- Stats at Pro Football Reference

Gary Brightwell Jr. (born February 28, 1999) is an American professional football running back. He has previously played in the NFL for the New York Giants and Cleveland Browns. He played college football for the Arizona Wildcats.

== Early life ==
Gary graduated in 2017 from St. Frances Academy in Baltimore. His senior season he served as team captain and was First-team all-conference and first-team All-State MIAA. He averaged 6.7 yards per carry as a senior rushing for 519 yards and eight touchdowns on 78 carries.

== College career ==
In his time at Arizona, Brightwell rushed for over 1,300 yards and had nine rushing touchdowns.

== Professional career ==
Pre-draft measurables
Height	Weight	Arm length	Hand span	Wingspan	40-yard dash	10-yard split	20-yard split	20-yard shuttle	Three-cone drill	Vertical jump	Broad jump	Bench press
5 ft 10 3/4 in (1.80 m)	218 lb (99 kg)	31 in (0.79 m)	9 3/8 in (0.24 m)	6 ft 2 1/4 in (1.89 m)	4.58 s	1.62 s	2.62 s	4.48 s	7.51 s	34.5 in (0.88 m)	9 ft 10 in (3.00 m)	17 reps
All values from Pro Day

=== New York Giants ===
Brightwell was selected by the New York Giants in the sixth round, 196th overall, of the 2021 NFL draft. On May 13, 2021, Brightwell officially signed with the Giants. On December 30, Brightwell was placed on injured reserve after suffering a neck injury.

Brightwell had his first career rushing touchdown in Week 5 against the Green Bay Packers in the 27–22 victory. In the 2022 season, Brightwell appeared in all 17 games. He totaled 31 carries for 141 rushing yards and one rushing touchdown.

Brightwell entered the 2023 season third on the running back depth chart. He suffered a hamstring injury in Week 7 and was placed on injured reserve on October 28, 2023. He was waived with injury designation on May 30, 2024.

=== Jacksonville Jaguars ===
On August 3, 2024, Brightwell signed with the Jacksonville Jaguars. He was waived on August 27.

=== Cleveland Browns ===
On August 29, 2024, Brightwell was signed to the Cleveland Browns' practice squad. He was promoted to the active roster on September 21. Brightwell was waived by the Browns on October 1, and re-signed to the practice squad. He was released on October 29.

=== Cincinnati Bengals ===
On November 11, 2024, the Cincinnati Bengals signed Brightwell to their practice squad. He signed a reserve/future contract with the Bengals on January 7, 2025.

On August 26, 2025, Brightwell was released by the Bengals as part of final roster cuts and was re-signed to the practice squad the next day. He signed a reserve/future contract with Cincinnati on January 5, 2026.

On August 30, 2026, Brightwell was released by the Bengals as a part of final roster cuts.

== Personal life ==
Brightwell's father was murdered at a gas station when Brightwell was five months old, his older sister was killed in a car crash when he was a senior in high school and his grandmother who taught him how to play football died just weeks before the NFL draft.
