= 2020 Oregon State Beavers football team =

American college football season

2020 Oregon State Beavers football
- Conference: Pac-12 Conference
- North Division
- Record: 2–5 (2–5 Pac-12)
- Head coach: Jonathan Smith (3rd season)
- Offensive coordinator: Brian Lindgren (3rd season)
- Offensive scheme: Spread
- Defensive coordinator: Tim Tibesar (3rd season)
- Base defense: Multiple 4–2–5
- Home stadium: Reser Stadium

2020 Pac-12 Conference football standings
	Conf.			Overall
Team	W		L	W		L
North Division
Washington x	3	–	1	3	–	1
Oregon y$	3	–	2	4	–	3
Stanford	4	–	2	4	–	2
California	1	–	3	1	–	3
Washington State	1	–	3	1	–	3
Oregon State	2	–	5	2	–	5
South Division
No. 21 USC xy	5	–	0	5	–	1
Colorado	3	–	1	4	–	2
Utah	3	–	2	3	–	2
Arizona State	2	–	2	2	–	2
UCLA	3	–	4	3	–	4
Arizona	0	–	5	0	–	5
Championship: Oregon 31, USC 24
$ – Conference champion; x – Division champion/co-champions; y – Championship game participant; Note: Due to COVID-19, the Pac-12 suspended the season on August 11, but later decided to begin play on November 6. In addition to the title game on December 18, the conference seeded all remaining teams for a game during that weekend.; Rankings from AP Poll.

The 2020 Oregon State Beavers football team represented Oregon State University during the 2020 NCAA Division I FBS football season. They were led by third-year head coach Jonathan Smith. The team played their home games on campus at Reser Stadium in Corvallis, Oregon, as a member of the North Division of the Pac-12 Conference.

On August 11, the Pac-12 Conference initially canceled all fall sports competitions due to the COVID-19 pandemic.

On September 24, the conference announced that a six-game conference-only season would begin on November 6, with the Pac-12 Championship Game to be played December 18. Teams not selected for the championship game would be seeded to play a seventh game.

== Preseason ==
=== Pac-12 media day ===
==== Pac-12 media poll ====
In the Pac-12 preseason media poll, Oregon State was voted to finish in last place in the North Division.

== Schedule ==
Oregon State had games scheduled against Oklahoma State, Colorado State, and Portland State, but canceled these games on July 10 due to the Pac-12 Conference's decision to play a conference-only schedule due to the COVID-19 pandemic.

Original 2020 Oregon State Beavers schedule
Date	Opponent	Site
September 3	at Oklahoma State*	Boone Pickens Stadium • Stillwater, OK
September 12	Colorado State*	Reser Stadium • Corvallis, OR
September 19	Portland State*	Reser Stadium • Corvallis, OR
September 26	Washington State	Reser Stadium • Corvallis, OR
October 3	at Arizona State	Sun Devil Stadium • Tempe, AZ
October 10	at Washington	Husky Stadium • Seattle, WA
October 24	California	Reser Stadium • Corvallis, OR
October 30	at Stanford	Stanford Stadium • Stanford, CA
November 7	UCLA	Reser Stadium • Corvallis, OR
November 14	at Utah	Rice–Eccles Stadium • Salt Lake City, UT
November 21	Arizona	Reser Stadium • Corvallis, OR
November 28	Oregon	Reser Stadium • Corvallis, OR (rivalry)

Date	Time	Opponent	Site	TV	Result	Attendance
November 7	7:30 p.m.	Washington State	Reser Stadium; Corvallis, OR	FS1	L 28–38	–
November 14	8:00 p.m.	at Washington	Husky Stadium; Seattle, WA	FS1	L 21–27	294
November 21	12:30 p.m.	California	Reser Stadium; Corvallis, OR	FS1	W 31–27	–
November 27	4:00 p.m.	No. 15 Oregon	Reser Stadium; Corvallis, OR (rivalry)	ESPN	W 41–38	–
December 5	7:30 p.m.	at Utah	Rice–Eccles Stadium; Salt Lake City, UT	ESPN	L 24–30	
December 12	7:30 p.m.	Stanford	Reser Stadium; Corvallis, OR	ESPNU	L 24–27	0
December 19	7:30 p.m.	Arizona State	Reser Stadium; Corvallis, OR	ESPN	L 33–46	0
Rankings from AP Poll released prior to the game; All times are in Pacific time

== Game summaries ==
=== Washington State ===
Washington State Cougars vs. Oregon State Beavers – Game summary

Quarter	1	2	3	4	Total
Cougars	7	7	14	10	38
Beavers	0	7	7	14	28

at Reser Stadium • Corvallis, Oregon

- Date: November 7, 2020
- Game time: 7:30 p.m. PST
- Game attendance: 0
- TV: FS1

Game information

First quarter

- WSU – Travell Harris 29-yard pass from Jayden de Laura (Blake Mazza kick), 3:50. Washington State 7–0. Drive: 6 plays, 58 yards, 2:44.

Second quarter

- OSU – Trevon Bradford 7-yard pass from Tristan Gebbia (Everett Hayes kick), 4:10. Tied 7–7. Drive: 15 plays, 93 yards, 7:27.
- WSU – Deon McIntosh 3-yard run (Blake Mazza kick), 0:37. Washington State 14–7. Drive: 9 plays, 84 yards, 3:27.

Third quarter

- WSU – Jayden de Laura 5-yard run (Blake Mazza kick), 12:10. Washington State 21–7. Drive: 5 plays, 64 yards, 1:52.
- WSU – Travell Harris 28-yard pass from Jayden de Laura (Blake Mazza kick), 8:12. Washington State 28–7. Drive: 4 plays, 38 yards, 2:20.
- OSU – Jermar Jefferson 1-yard run (Everett Hayes kick), 3:27. Washington State 28–14. Drive: 9 plays, 85 yards, 4:47.

Fourth quarter

- WSU – Blake Mazza 34-yard field goal, 11:59. Washington State 31–14. Drive: 12 plays, 66 yards, 6:22.
- OSU – Jermar Jefferson 7-yard run (pass failed), 11:01. Washington State 31–20. Drive: 8 plays, 72 yards, 3:21.
- OSU – Jermar Jefferson 15-yard run (Tristan Gebbia–Trevon Bradford pass), 2:39. Washington State 31–28. Drive: 14 plays, 90 yards, 2:52.
- WSU – Travell Harris 44-yard run (Blake Mazza kick), 2:29. Washington State 38–28. Drive: 1 play, 44 yards, 0:09.

Top passers

- WSU – Jayden de Laura – 18/33, 227 yards, 2 TD, INT
- OSU – Tristan Gebbia – 34/48, 329 yards, TD

Top rushers

- WSU – Deon McIntosh – 18 rushes, 147 yards, TD
- OSU – Jermar Jefferson – 21 rushes, 120 yards, 3 TD

Top receivers

- WSU – Travell Harris – 9 receptions, 130 yards, 2 TD
- OSU – Trevon Bradford – 7 receptions, 78 yards, TD

=== At Washington ===
Oregon State Beavers vs. Washington Huskies – Game summary

Quarter	1	2	3	4	Total
Beavers	7	14	0	0	21
Huskies	10	14	0	3	27

at Husky Stadium • Seattle, Washington

- Date: November 14, 2020
- Game time: 8:00 p.m. PST
- Game weather: 43 °F (6 °C) • Light Rain • Wind @ 8 mph (13 km/h)
- Game attendance: 294 (Limited in-person attendance)
- Referee: Mike McCabe
- TV announcers (FS1): Petros Papadakis and Alex Faust

Game information

First quarter

- OSU – Jaydon Grant 11-yard return of blocked punt (Everett Hayes kick), 9:46. Oregon State 7–0. Drive: 0 plays, 0 yards, 0:00.
- UW – Sean McGrew 21-yard run (Peyton Henry kick), 7:44. Tied 7–7. Drive: 5 plays, 75 yards, 2:02.
- UW – Peyton Henry 25-yard field goal, 2:10. Washington 10–7. Drive: 9 plays, 52 yards, 4:23.

Second quarter

- UW – Kamari Pleasant 15-yard run (Peyton Henry kick), 14:15. Washington 17–7. Drive: 3 plays, 32 yards, 0:58.
- OSU – B. J. Baylor 3-yard run (Everett Hayes kick), 9:31. Washington 17–14. Drive: 11 plays, 80 yards, 4:38.
- UW – Dylan Morris 1-yard run (Peyton Henry kick), 2:19. Washington 24–14. Drive: 8 plays, 15 yards, 3:49.
- OSU – Jermar Jefferson 4-yard run (Everett Hayes kick), 0:18. Washington 24–21. Drive: 9 plays, 56 yards, 1:53.

Third quarter

- No Scoring Plays.

Fourth quarter

- UW – Peyton Henry 23-yard field goal, 1:45. Washington 27–21. Drive: 15 plays, 52 yards, 7:24.

Top passers

- OSU – Tristan Gebbia – 11/24, 85 yards, INT
- UW – Dylan Morris – 14/24, 141 yards

Top rushers

- OSU – Jermar Jefferson – 23 carries, 133 yards, TD
- UW – Sean McGrew – 9 carries, 92 yards, TD

Top receivers

- OSU – Luke Musgrave – 2 receptions, 25 yards
- UW – Terrell Bynum – 4 receptions, 66 yards

=== California ===
California Golden Bears vs. Oregon State Beavers – Game summary

Quarter	1	2	3	4	Total
Golden Bears	7	13	0	7	27
Beavers	14	0	3	14	31

at Reser Stadium • Corvallis, Oregon

- Date: November 21, 2020
- Game time: 12:30 p.m. PST
- Game weather: Partly cloudy, 41 °F (5 °C)
- Game attendance: 0
- Referee: Chris Coyle
- TV announcers (FS1): Eric Collins (play-by-play) and Ben Leber (analyst)

Game information

First quarter

- OSU – Jermar Jefferson 75-yard run (Everett Hayes kick), 14:42. Oregon State 7–0. Drive: 1 play, 75 yards, 0:18.
- CAL – Makai Polk 7-yard pass from Chase Garbers (Dario Longhetto kick), 10:30. Tied 7–7. Drive: 8 plays, 75 yards, 4:12.
- OSU – Teagan Quitoriano 35-yard pass from Tristan Gebbia (Everett Hayes kick), 5:47. Oregon State 14–7. Drive: 1 play, 35 yards, 0:09.

Second quarter

- CAL – Dario Longhetto 26-yard field goal, 14:49. Oregon State 14–10. Drive: 12 plays, 66 yards, 5:58.
- CAL – Kekoa Crawford 21-yard pass from Chase Garbers (Dario Longhetto kick), 2:31. California 17–14. Drive: 4 plays, 64 yards, 2:05.
- CAL – Dario Longhetto 52-yard field goal, 0:00. California 20–14. Drive: 11 plays, 30 yards, 1:24.

Third quarter

- OSU – Everett Hayes 35-yard field goal, 6:20. California 20–17. Drive: 13 plays, 53 yards, 5:45.

Fourth quarter

- OSU – Tristan Gebbia 8-yard pass from Tyjon Lindsey (Everett Hayes kick), 13:35. Oregon State 24–20. Drive: 6 plays, 39 yards, 2:57.
- CAL – Jake Tonges 2-yard pass from Chase Garbers (Dario Longhetto kick), 8:04. California 27–24. Drive: 6 plays, 32 yards, 2:21.
- OSU – Tristan Gebbia 1-yard run (Everett Hayes kick), 4:30. Oregon State 31–27. Drive: 3 plays, 14 yards, 0:56.

Top passers

- CAL – Chase Garbers – 28/42, 315 yards, 3 TD, 2 INT
- OSU – Tristan Gebbia – 12/20, 147 yards, TD, 2 INT

Top rushers

- CAL – Marcel Dancy – 17 rushes, 76 yards
- OSU – Jermar Jefferson – 18 rushes, 196 yards, TD

Top receivers

- CAL – Kekoa Crawford – 10 receptions, 141 yards, TD
- OSU – Teagan Quitoriano – 4 receptions, 65 yards, TD

=== Oregon ===
Oregon Ducks vs. Oregon State Beavers – Game summary

Quarter	1	2	3	4	Total
No. 15 Ducks	14	10	7	7	38
Beavers	7	6	6	22	41

at Reser Stadium • Corvallis, Oregon

- Date: November 27, 2020
- Game time: 4:30 p.m. PST
- Game weather: Cloudy, 43 °F (6 °C)
- Game attendance: 0
- Referee: Steven Strimling
- TV: ESPN
- Reference

Game information

First quarter

- ORE – Jaylon Redd 37-yard run (Henry Katleman kick), 11:52. Oregon 7–0. Drive: 8 plays, 77 yards, 3:08.
- OSU – Jermar Jefferson 82-yard run (Everett Hayes kick), 10:59. Tied 7–7. Drive: 2 plays, 91 yards, 0:53.
- ORE – Tyler Shough 1-yard run (Henry Katleman kick), 5:21. Oregon 14–7. Drive: 11 plays, 93 yards, 5:38.

Second quarter

- OSU – Everett Hayes 34-yard field goal, 13:38. Oregon 14–10. Drive: 10 plays, 83 yards, 3:49.
- ORE – Devon Williams 60-yard pass from Tyler Shough (Henry Katleman kick), 10:57. Oregon 21–10. Drive: 6 plays, 75 yards, 2:41.
- OSU – Everett Hayes 48-yard field goal, 5:55. Oregon 21–13. Drive: 11 plays, 45 yards, 5:02.
- ORE – Henry Katleman 33-yard field goal, 0:46. Oregon 24–13. Drive: 6 plays, 29 yards, 2:00.

Third quarter

- OSU – Zeriah Beason 8-yard pass from Tristan Gebbia (pass failed), 8:57. Oregon 24–19. Drive: 6 plays, 38 yards, 3:08.
- ORE – Hunter Kampmoyer 4-yard pass from Tyler Shough (Henry Katleman kick), 6:43. Oregon 31–19. Drive: 6 plays, 74 yards, 2:14.

Fourth quarter

- OSU – Tristan Gebbia 1-yard run (Everett Hayes kick), 13:26. Oregon 31–26. Drive: 16 plays, 92 yards, 8:17.
- OSU – Jermar Jefferson 2-yard run (Tristan Gebbia run), 12:23. Oregon State 34–31. Drive: 2 plays, 33 yards, 0:15.
- ORE – Cyrus Habibi-Likio 1-yard run (Henry Katleman kick), 8:27. Oregon 38–34. Drive: 10 plays, 75 yards, 3:56.
- OSU – Chance Nolan 1-yard run (Everett Hayes kick), 0:33. Oregon State 41–38. Drive: 10 plays, 53 yards, 1:22.

Top passers

- ORE – Tyler Shough – 20/31, 285 yards, 2 TD, 2 INT
- OSU – Tristan Gebbia – 23/37, 263 yards, TD

Top rushers

- ORE – Travis Dye – 12 rushes, 93 yards
- OSU – Jermar Jefferson – 29 rushes, 226 yards, 2 TD

Top receivers

- ORE – Devon Williams – 4 receptions, 101 yards, TD
- OSU – Kolby Taylor – 7 receptions, 114 yards

=== At Utah ===
Oregon State Beavers vs. Utah Utes – Game summary

Quarter	1	2	3	4	Total
Beavers	0	10	0	14	24
Utes	6	10	7	7	30

at Rice-Eccles Stadium • Salt Lake City, Utah

- Date: December 5, 2020
- Game time: 8:30 p.m. MST
- Game weather: Clear, 30 °F (−1 °C)
- Game attendance: 0
- Referee: Mike McCabe
- TV: ESPN
- Reference

Game information

First quarter

- UTAH – Jadon Redding 33-yard field goal, 10:21. Utah 3–0. Drive: 9 plays, 60 yards, 4:39.
- UTAH – Jadon Redding 20-yard field goal, 6:50. Utah 6–0. Drive: 4 plays, 8 yards, 1:31.

Second quarter

- UTAH – Jadon Redding 27-yard field goal, 12:27. Utah 9–0. Drive: 11 plays, 60 yards, 5:12.
- OSU – Everett Hayes 33-yard field goal, 9:16. Utah 9–3. Drive: 7 plays, 54 yards, 3:05.
- UTAH – Ty Jordan 1-yard run (Jadon Redding kick), 3:10. Utah 16–3. Drive: 10 plays, 75 yards, 6:06.
- OSU – Calvin Tyler Jr. 1-yard run (Everett Hayes kick), 0:50. Utah 16–10. Drive: 9 plays, 75 yards, 2:20.

Third quarter

- UTAH – Britain Covey 8-yard pass from Jake Bentley (Jadon Redding kick), 6:22. Utah 23–10. Drive: 14 plays, 89 yards, 7:45.

Fourth quarter

- UTAH – Britain Covey 64-yard punt return (Jadon Redding kick), 14:37. Utah 30–10.
- OSU – Calvin Tyler Jr. 6-yard run (Everett Hayes kick), 11:50. Utah 30–17. Drive: 8 plays, 65 yards, 2:41.
- OSU – Kolby Taylor 21-yard pass from Chance Nolan (Everett Hayes kick), 5:07. Utah 30–24. Drive: 9 plays, 61 yards, 2:11.

Top passers

- OSU – Chance Nolan – 20/38, 202 yards, TD, INT
- UTAH – Jake Bentley – 18/27, 174 yards, TD

Top rushers

- OSU – Jack Colletto – 1 rush, 40 yards
- UTAH – Ty Jordan – 27 rushes, 167 yards, TD

Top receivers

- OSU – Tyjon Lindsey – 3 receptions, 37 yards
- UTAH – Brant Kuithe – 8 receptions, 76 yards

=== Stanford ===
Stanford Cardinal vs. Oregon State Beavers – Game summary

Quarter	1	2	3	4	Total
Cardinal	6	3	7	11	27
Beavers	7	7	7	3	24

at Reser Stadium • Corvallis, OR

- Date: December 12, 2020
- Game time: 7:00 p.m. PST
- Game weather: Cloudy, 36 °F (2 °C)
- Game attendance: 0
- Referee: Francisco Villar
- TV announcers (ESPNU): John Schriffen, Rene Ingoglia
- Reference

Game information

First quarter

- OSU – Tyjon Lindsey 18-yard pass from Chance Nolan (Everett Hayes kick), 9:46. Oregon State 7–0. Drive: 11 plays, 75 yards, 5:14.
- STAN – Tucker Fisk 12-yard pass from Davis Mills (pass failed), 5:45. Oregon State 7–6. Drive: 8 plays, 77 yards, 3:56.

Second quarter

- OSU – Zeriah Beason 8-yard pass from Chance Nolan (Everett Hayes kick), 12:34. Oregon State 14–6. Drive: 4 plays, 88 yards, 2:19.
- STAN – Jet Toner 47-yard field goal, 1:16. Oregon State 14–9. Drive: 7 plays, 57 yards, 1:14.

Third quarter

- STAN – Davis Mills 1-yard run (Jet Toner kick), 12:14. Stanford 16–14. Drive: 6 plays, 71 yards, 2:39.
- OSU – Tyjon Lindsey 30-yard pass from Chance Nolan (Everett Hayes kick), 8:38. Oregon State 21–16. Drive: 9 plays, 75 yards, 3:36.

Fourth quarter

- STAN – Davis Mills 6-yard run (Davis Mills–Houston Heimuli pass), 13:03. Stanford 24–21. Drive: 13 plays, 90 yards, 6:10.
- OSU – Everett Hayes 26-yard field goal, 7:18. Tied 24–24. Drive: 13 plays, 67 yards, 5:45.
- STAN – Jet Toner 39-yard field goal, 1:48. Stanford 27–24. Drive: 10 plays, 62 yards, 5:24.

Top passers

- STAN – Davis Mills – 21/29, 292 yards, TD
- OSU – Chance Nolan – 17/30, 221 yards, 3 TD

Top rushers

- STAN – Austin Jones – 22 rushes, 126 yards
- OSU – Jermar Jefferson – 18 rushes, 80 yards

Top receivers

- STAN – Simi Fehoko – 6 receptions, 110 yards
- OSU – Tre'Shaun Harrison – 5 receptions, 91 yards

== Players drafted into the NFL ==
Round	Pick	Player	Position	NFL Club
3	99	Nahshon Wright	CB	Dallas Cowboys
