= 2020 Washington State Cougars football team =

American college football season

2020 Washington State Cougars football
- Conference: Pac–12 Conference
- North Division
- Record: 1–3 (1–3 Pac-12)
- Head coach: Nick Rolovich (1st season)
- Offensive coordinator: Brian Smith (1st season)
- Co-offensive coordinator: Craig Stutzmann (1st season)
- Offensive scheme: Run and Shoot
- Defensive coordinator: Jake Dickert (1st season)
- Base defense: 4–2–5
- Captains: Max Borghi; Abraham Lucas; Liam Ryan; Jahad Woods
- Home stadium: Martin Stadium

2020 Pac-12 Conference football standings
	Conf.			Overall
Team	W		L	W		L
North Division
Washington x	3	–	1	3	–	1
Oregon y$	3	–	2	4	–	3
Stanford	4	–	2	4	–	2
California	1	–	3	1	–	3
Washington State	1	–	3	1	–	3
Oregon State	2	–	5	2	–	5
South Division
No. 21 USC xy	5	–	0	5	–	1
Colorado	3	–	1	4	–	2
Utah	3	–	2	3	–	2
Arizona State	2	–	2	2	–	2
UCLA	3	–	4	3	–	4
Arizona	0	–	5	0	–	5
Championship: Oregon 31, USC 24
$ – Conference champion; x – Division champion/co-champions; y – Championship game participant; Note: Due to COVID-19, the Pac-12 suspended the season on August 11, but later decided to begin play on November 6. In addition to the title game on December 18, the conference seeded all remaining teams for a game during that weekend.; Rankings from AP Poll.

The 2020 Washington State Cougars football team represented Washington State University during the 2020 NCAA Division I FBS football season. They were led by first-year head coach Nick Rolovich. The team played their home games in Martin Stadium in Pullman, Washington, and competed as members of the North Division of the Pac-12 Conference.

On August 11, 2020, the Pac-12 Conference initially canceled all fall sports competitions due to the COVID-19 pandemic.

On September 24, the conference announced that a six-game conference-only season would begin on November 6, with the Pac-12 Championship Game to be played December 18. Teams not selected for the championship game would be seeded to play a seventh game.

== Schedule ==
Washington State had games scheduled against Utah State, Houston, and Idaho, but canceled these games on July 10 due to the Pac-12 Conference's decision to play a conference-only schedule due to the COVID-19 pandemic.

Original 2020 Washington State Cougars schedule
Date	Opponent	Site
September 3	at Utah State*	Maverik Stadium • Logan, UT
September 12	Houston*	Martin Stadium • Pullman, WA
September 19	Idaho*	Martin Stadium • Pullman, WA (Battle of the Palouse)
September 26	at Oregon State	Reser Stadium • Corvallis, OR
October 3	California	Martin Stadium • Pullman, WA
October 10	Utah	Martin Stadium • Pullman, WA
October 17	at Stanford	Stanford Stadium • Stanford, CA
October 31	Arizona State	Martin Stadium • Pullman, WA
November 7	at Colorado	Folsom Field • Boulder, CO
November 14	at UCLA	Rose Bowl • Pasadena, CA
November 21	Oregon	Martin Stadium • Pullman, WA
November 27	Washington	Martin Stadium • Pullman, WA (Apple Cup)

Date	Time	Opponent	Rank	Site	TV	Result	Attendance
November 7	7:30 p.m.	at Oregon State		Reser Stadium; Corvallis, OR	FS1	W 38–28	—
November 14	4:00 p.m.	No. 11 Oregon		Martin Stadium; Pullman, WA	FOX	L 29–43	—
~~November 21~~	~~7:30 p.m.~~	at ~~Stanford~~		~~Stanford Stadium~~; ~~Stanford, CA~~	~~FS1~~	No Contest	
~~November 27~~	~~7:30 p.m.~~	~~Washington~~		~~Martin Stadium~~; ~~Pullman, WA~~ (~~Apple Cup~~)	~~ESPN~~	No Contest	
December 6	4:30 p.m.	at No. 20 USC		Los Angeles Memorial Coliseum; Los Angeles, California	FS1	L 13–38	—
~~December 12~~	~~1:00 p.m.~~	~~California~~		~~Martin Stadium~~; ~~Pullman, WA~~	~~FOX~~	No Contest	
December 19	10:30 a.m.	at Utah		Rice–Eccles Stadium; Salt Lake City, UT	FS1	L 28–45	
Rankings from AP Poll released prior to the game; All times are in Pacific time

== #WeAreUnited controversy ==
In the wake of the COVID-19 pandemic, student athletes of the Pac-12 Conference formed a unity group to negotiate with the conference to get more fair treatment for student athletes ranging from COVID-19 safety protocols to racial equality messages under the threat of opting out of the fall season with the hashtag #WeAreUnited.

On August 2, 2020, Washington State wide receiver Kassidy Woods alleged that head coach Nick Rolovich threatened his status on the team, while also being removed from the team chats and being told to clear out his locker. Woods also released an audio conversation between him and Rolovich to the Dallas Morning News, where Rolovich was understanding of Woods opting out due to COVID-19 but was still critical of the unity group. Rolovich said in a statement that the said conversation between him and Woods occurred before the release of the #WeAreUnited group's article, and Washington State spokesman Bill Stephens clarified that Woods did not lose his scholarship or has been cut from the team, while ESPN reported that no one has been cut, but is not allowed to participate in team activities if they choose to opt out due to safety reasons.

== Personnel ==
=== Staff ===
Name	Position	Seasons at Washington State	Alma mater
Nick Rolovich	Head coach	1	Hawaii (2004)
Brian Smith	Offensive coordinator / running backs	1	Hawaii (2005)
Jake Dickert	Defensive coordinator / Linebackers	1	Wisconsin–Stevens Point (2007)
Michael Ghobrial	Special teams coordinator	1	UCLA (2011)
Craig Stutzmann	Co-offensive coordinator / quarterbacks	1	Hawaii (2002)
Andre Allen	Wide receivers	1	Ashford (2014)
Mark Weber	Offensive line	1	Cal Lutheran (1980)
A. J. Cooper	Defensive ends	1	North Dakota State (2006)
Ricky Logo	Defensive tackles	1	North Carolina State (1992)
Mark Banker	Safeties	1	Springfield (MA) (1978)
John Richardson	Cornerbacks / recruiting coordinator	1	North Dakota State (2010)
Dwain Bradshaw	Head strength and conditioning coach	1	Arizona State (2014)
Jason Cvercko	Chief of Staff	1	Connecticut (2011)

== Rankings ==
Ranking movements Legend: ██ Increase in ranking ██ Decrease in ranking — = Not ranked RV = Received votes
	Week																	
Poll	Pre	1	2	3	4	5	6	7	8	9	10	11	12	13	14	15	16	Final
AP	—	—	—	—	—	—	—	—	—	—								
Coaches	RV	—	—	—	—	—	—	—	—	—								
CFP	Not released																	Not released

== Game summaries ==
=== At Oregon State ===
Washington State Cougars (0–0) at Oregon State Beavers (0–0)

Quarter	1	2	3	4	Total
Cougars	7	7	14	10	38
Beavers	0	7	7	14	28

at Reser Stadium, Corvallis, Oregon

- Date: November 7, 2020
- Game time: 7:30 p.m. PST
- Game attendance: 0
- TV announcers (FS1): Alex Faust (play-by-play) & Petros Papadakis (analyst)

Game information

First quarter

- WSU – Travell Harris 29-yard pass from Jayden de Laura (Blake Mazza kick), 3:50. Washington St. 7–0. Drive: 6 plays, 58 yards, 2:44.

Second quarter

- OSU – Trevon Bradford 7-yard pass from Tristan Gebbia (Everett Hayes kick), 4:10. Tied 7–7. Drive: 15 plays, 93 yards, 7:27.
- WSU – Deon McIntosh 3-yard run (Blake Mazza kick), 0:37. Washington St. 14–7. Drive: 9 plays, 84 yards, 3:27.

Third quarter

- WSU – Jayden de Laura 5-yard run (Blake Mazza kick), 12:10. Washington St. 21–7. Drive: 5 plays, 64 yards, 1:52.
- WSU – Travell Harris 28-yard pass from Jayden de Laura (Blake Mazza kick), 8:20. Washington St. 28–7. Drive: 4 plays, 38 yards, 2:20.
- OSU – Jermar Jefferson 1-yard run (Everett Hayes kick), 3:27. Washington St. 28–14. Drive: 9 plays, 85 yards, 4:47.

Fourth quarter

- WSU – Blake Mazza 34-yard field goal, 11:59. Washington St. 31–14. Drive: 12 plays, 66 yards, 6:22.
- OSU – Jermar Jefferson 7-yard run (two-point conversion failed), 8:32. Washington St. 31–20. Drive: 8 plays, 72 yards, 3:21.
- OSU – Jermar Jefferson 15-yard run (Tristan Gebbia–Trevon Bradford pass), 2:39. Washington St. 31–28. Drive: 14 plays, 90 yards, 2:52.
- WSU – Travell Harris 44-yard run (Blake Mazza kick), 2:29. Washington St. 38–28. Drive: 1 play, 44 yards, 0:09.

Top passers

- WSU – Jayden de Laura – 18/33, 227 yards, 2 TD, int
- OSU – Tristan Gebbia – 34/48, 329 yards, TD

Top rushers

- WSU – Deon McIntosh – 18 rushes, 147 yards, TD
- OSU – Jermar Jefferson – 21 rushes, 120 yards, 3 TD

Top receivers

- WSU – Travell Harris – 7 receptions, 107 yards, 2 TD
- OSU – Trevon Bradford – 7 receptions, 78 yards, TD

=== Oregon ===
Oregon Ducks (1–0) at Washington State Cougars (1–0)

Quarter	1	2	3	4	Total
No. 11 Ducks	7	7	7	22	43
Cougars	13	6	0	10	29

at Martin Stadium • Pullman, Washington

- Date: November 14, 2020
- Game time: 4:00 p.m. PST
- Game attendance: 0
- Referee: Chris Coyle
- TV announcers (FOX): Tim Brando (play-by-play) & Spencer Tillman (analyst)

Game information

First quarter

- ORE – D.J. Johnson 13-yard pass from Tyler Shough (Camden Lewis kick), 6:48. Oregon 7–0. Drive: 15 plays, 92 yards, 5:50.
- WSU – Lucas Bacon 18-yard pass from Jayden de Laura (two-point conversion failed), 3:00. Oregon 7–6. Drive: 6 plays, 77 yards, 3:48.
- WSU – Renard Bell 4-yard pass from Jayden de Laura (Blake Mazza kick), 0:48. Washington State 13–7. Drive: 4 plays, 53 yards, 1:33.

Second quarter

- WSU – Blake Mazza 39-yard field goal, 9:38. Washington State 16–7. Drive: 7 plays, 35 yards, 3:00.
- WSU – Blake Mazza 49-yard field goal, 0:24. Washington State 19–7. Drive: 13 plays, 59 yards, 6:19.
- ORE – CJ Verdell 3-yard run (Camden Lewis kick), 0:03. Washington State 19–14. Drive: 2 plays, 60 yards, 0:17.

Third quarter

- ORE – Travis Dye 16-yard pass from Tyler Shough (Camden Lewis kick), 3:26. Oregon 21–19. Drive: 5 plays, 68 yards, 2:09.

Fourth quarter

- ORE – Johnny Johnson III 2-yard pass from Tyler Shough (Camden Lewis kick), 14:19. Oregon 28–19. Drive: 7 plays, 80 yards, 3:06.
- WSU – Blake Mazza 25-yard field goal, 9:59. Oregon 28–22. Drive: 7 plays, 79 yards, 4:20.
- ORE – Travis Dye 71-yard pass from Tyler Shough (Tyler Shough run), 8:25. Oregon 36–22. Drive: 3 plays, 75 yards, 1:34.
- WSU – Deon McIntosh 1-yard run (Blake Mazza kick), 4:40. Oregon 36–29. Drive: 9 plays, 74 yards, 3:45.
- ORE – Cyrus Habibi-Likio 1-yard run (Camden Lewis kick), 1:40. Oregon 43–29. Drive: 6 plays, 75 yards, 3:00.

Top passers

- ORE – Tyler Shough – 21/30, 312 yards, 4 TD, int
- WSU – Jayden de Laura – 25/39, 329 yards, 2 TD

Top rushers

- ORE – C. J. Verdell – 18 rushes, 118 yards, TD
- WSU – Deon McIntosh – 18 rushes, 92 yards, TD

Top receivers

- ORE – Jaylon Redd – 5 receptions, 99 yards
- WSU – Renard Bell – 10 receptions, 158 yards, TD

=== At USC ===
Washington State Cougars (1–1) at USC Trojans (3–0)

Quarter	1	2	3	4	Total
Cougars	0	6	0	7	13
No. 20 Trojans	28	7	3	0	38

at Los Angeles Memorial Coliseum, Los Angeles, California

- Date: December 6, 2020
- Game time: 4:30 p.m. PST
- Game weather: Scattered clouds, 64 °F (18 °C)
- Game attendance: 0
- Referee: Steven Strimling
- TV announcers (FS1): Alex Faust, Petros Papadakis
- Reference

Game information

First quarter

- USC – Amon-Ra St. Brown 7-yard pass from Kedon Slovis (Parker Lewis kick), 8:46. USC 7–0. Drive: 7 plays, 65 yards, 2:50.
- USC – Amon-Ra St. Brown 22-yard pass from Kedon Slovis (Parker Lewis kick), 5:11. USC 14–0. Drive: 5 plays, 34 yards, 2:20.
- USC – Amon-Ra St. Brown 4-yard pass from Kedon Slovis (Parker Lewis kick), 2:33. USC 21–0. Drive: 1 play, 4 yards, 0:06.
- USC – Amon-Ra St. Brown 2-yard pass from Kedon Slovis (Parker Lewis kick), 0:44. USC 28–0. Drive: 4 plays, 31 yards, 1:40.

Second quarter

- USC – Tyler Vaughns 35-yard pass from Kedon Slovis (Parker Lewis kick), 7:11. USC 35–0. Drive: 7 plays, 80 yards, 3:51.
- WSU – Travell Harris 5-yard run (kick failed), 0:28. USC 35–6. Drive: 11 plays, 75 yards, 6:43.

Third quarter

- USC – Parker Lewis 48-yard field goal, 11:53. USC 38–6. Drive: 8 plays, 16 yards, 3:07.

Fourth quarter

- WSU – Renard Bell 6-yard pass from Gunner Cruz (Blake Mazza kick), 1:37. USC 38–13. Drive: 16 plays, 93 yards, 10:38.

Top passers

- WSU – Jayden de Laura – 18/29, 134 yards, 2 int
- USC – Kedon Slovis – 25/32, 287 yards, 5 TD

Top rushers

- WSU – Deon McIntosh – 10 rushes, 65 yards
- USC – Kenan Christon – 3 rushes, 11 yards

Top receivers

- WSU – Renard Bell – 11 receptions, 76 yards, TD
- USC – Drake London – 5 receptions, 92 yards

=== At Utah ===
Washington State Cougars (1–2) at Utah Utes (2–2)

Quarter	1	2	3	4	Total
Cougars	7	21	0	0	28
Utes	0	7	14	24	45

at Rice-Eccles Stadium, Salt Lake City, Utah

- Date: December 19, 2020
- Game time: 10:30 a.m. PST
- Game weather: Partly cloudy, 38 °F (3 °C)
- Game attendance: 0
- Referee: Mark Duddy
- TV: FS1
- Reference

Game information

First quarter

- WSU – Max Borghi 8-yard run (Blake Mazza kick), 4:34. Washington State 7–0. Drive: 7 plays, 57 yards, 4:26.

Second quarter

- WSU – Deon McIntosh 11-yard run (Blake Mazza kick), 8:31. Washington State 14–0. Drive: 7 plays, 88 yards, 4:01.
- UTAH – Britain Covey 91-yard pass from Jake Bentley (Jadon Redding kick), 3:37. Washington State 14–7. Drive: 3 plays, 95 yards, 0:58.
- WSU – Jamire Calvin 8-yard pass from Jayden de Laura (Blake Mazza kick), 1:51. Washington State 21–7. Drive: 4 plays, 75 yards, 1:46.
- WSU – Jayden de Laura 3-yard run (Blake Mazza kick), 1:21. Washington State 28–7. Drive: 1 play, 3 yards, 0:04.

Third quarter

- UTAH – Ty Jordan 5-yard run (Jadon Redding kick), 6:09. Washington State 28–14. Drive: 9 plays, 81 yards, 4:39.
- UTAH – Bryan Thompson 9-yard run (Jadon Redding kick), 0:55. Washington State 28–21. Drive: 8 plays, 68 yards, 3:38.

Fourth quarter

- UTAH – Ty Jordan 33-yard run (Jadon Redding kick), 12:01. Tied 28–28. Drive: 7 plays, 70 yards, 2:15.
- UTAH – Ty Jordan 13-yard run (Jadon Redding kick), 6:29. Utah 35–28. Drive: 2 plays, 13 yards, 0:12.
- UTAH – Jadon Redding 44-yard field goal, 2:37. Utah 38–28. Drive: 7 plays, 30 yards, 3:37.
- UTAH – Clark Phillips III 36-yard interception return (Jadon Redding kick), 2:06. Utah 45–28.

Top passers

- WSU – Jayden de Laura – 17/28, 204 yards, TD, int
- UTAH – Jake Bentley – 7/14, 153 yards, TD, int

Top rushers

- WSU – Max Borghi – 10 rushes, 95 yards, TD
- UTAH – Ty Jordan – 22 rushes, 154 yards, 3 TD

Top receivers

- WSU – Jamire Calvin – 7 receptions, 104 yards, TD
- UTAH – Britain Covey – 6 receptions, 134 yards, TD

== Awards ==
Player	Award	Date
Jayden de Laura	Pac-12 Freshman of the Week	November 9, 2020
Ayden Hector	Pac-12 Freshman of the Week	November 16, 2020
