= 2020 Utah Utes football team =

American college football season

2020 Utah Utes football
- Conference: Pac-12 Conference
- South Division
- Record: 3–2 (3–2 Pac-12)
- Head coach: Kyle Whittingham (16th season)
- Offensive coordinator: Andy Ludwig (6th season)
- Offensive scheme: Spread
- Defensive coordinator: Morgan Scalley (5th season)
- Base defense: 4–3
- Captains: Jake Bentley; Devin Lloyd; Mika Tafua; Orlando Umana
- Home stadium: Rice–Eccles Stadium

2020 Pac-12 Conference football standings
	Conf.			Overall
Team	W		L	W		L
North Division
Washington x	3	–	1	3	–	1
Oregon y$	3	–	2	4	–	3
Stanford	4	–	2	4	–	2
California	1	–	3	1	–	3
Washington State	1	–	3	1	–	3
Oregon State	2	–	5	2	–	5
South Division
No. 21 USC xy	5	–	0	5	–	1
Colorado	3	–	1	4	–	2
Utah	3	–	2	3	–	2
Arizona State	2	–	2	2	–	2
UCLA	3	–	4	3	–	4
Arizona	0	–	5	0	–	5
Championship: Oregon 31, USC 24
$ – Conference champion; x – Division champion/co-champions; y – Championship game participant; Note: Due to COVID-19, the Pac-12 suspended the season on August 11, but later decided to begin play on November 6. In addition to the title game on December 18, the conference seeded all remaining teams for a game during that weekend.; Rankings from AP Poll.

The 2020 Utah Utes football team represented the University of Utah during the 2020 NCAA Division I FBS football season. The Utes were led by 16th-year head coach Kyle Whittingham and played their home games at Rice–Eccles Stadium in Salt Lake City, Utah, as members of the South Division of the Pac-12 Conference.

On August 11, 2020, the Pac-12 suspended all fall sports competitions due to the COVID-19 pandemic. On September 24, the Pac-12 announced that football teams would return to play a seven-game conference-only season beginning on November 6, with the conference championship game scheduled for December 18.

On December 18, with a 2–2 record and one game left to play, the Utes announced that they would not pursue a bid to a bowl game. The Utes won their final game, finishing their season with a 3–2 record. Running back Ty Jordan was voted the Pac-12 Offensive Freshman of the Year.

== Schedule ==
Utah had games scheduled against BYU, Montana State, and Wyoming, but canceled these games on July 10 due to the Pac-12 Conference's decision to play a conference-only schedule due to the COVID-19 pandemic.

On November 24, Utah's scheduled game at Arizona State for November 29 was canceled after a COVID-19 outbreak within the Arizona State program. The Pac-12 then announced that Utah would instead play at Washington on November 28; the Huskies' scheduled game at Washington State had also been canceled after Washington State had a COVID-19 outbreak.

Original 2020 Utah Utes schedule
Date	Opponent	Site
September 3	BYU*	Rice–Eccles Stadium • Salt Lake City, UT (Holy War)
September 12	Montana State*	Rice–Eccles Stadium • Salt Lake City, UT
September 19	at Wyoming*	War Memorial Stadium • Laramie, WY
September 26	at California	California Memorial Stadium • Berkeley, CA
October 2	USC	Rice–Eccles Stadium • Salt Lake City, UT
October 10	at Washington State	Martin Stadium • Pullman, WA
October 17	Washington	Rice–Eccles Stadium • Salt Lake City, UT
October 29	at UCLA	Rose Bowl • Pasadena, CA
November 7	Arizona	Rice–Eccles Stadium • Salt Lake City, UT
November 14	Oregon State	Rice–Eccles Stadium • Salt Lake City, UT
November 21	at Arizona State	Sun Devil Stadium • Tempe, AZ
November 28	at Colorado	Folsom Field • Boulder, CO (Rumble in the Rockies)

Date	Time	Opponent	Rank	Site	TV	Result	Attendance
~~November 7~~	~~1:30 p.m.~~	~~Arizona~~		~~Rice–Eccles Stadium~~; ~~Salt Lake City, UT~~	~~ESPN2~~	No Contest	
~~November 14~~	~~8:30 p.m.~~	~~at UCLA~~		~~Rose Bowl~~; ~~Pasadena, CA~~	~~FOX~~	No Contest	
November 21	8:30 p.m.	No. 20 USC		Rice–Eccles Stadium; Salt Lake City, UT	ESPN	L 17–33	0
November 28	5:30 p.m.	at Washington		Husky Stadium; Seattle, WA	ABC	L 21–24	259
December 5	8:30 p.m.	Oregon State		Rice–Eccles Stadium; Salt Lake City, UT	ESPN	W 30–24	0
December 12	10:00 a.m.	at No. 21 Colorado		Folsom Field; Boulder, CO (Rumble in the Rockies)	FOX	W 38–21	0
December 19	11:30 a.m.	Washington State		Rice–Eccles Stadium; Salt Lake City, UT	FS1	W 45–28	0
Rankings from AP Poll and CFP Rankings after November 24 released prior to game; All times are in Mountain time

== Rankings ==
Ranking movements Legend: ██ Increase in ranking ██ Decrease in ranking — = Not ranked RV = Received votes
	Week																	
Poll	Pre	1	2	3	4	5	6	7	8	9	10	11	12	13	14	15	16	Final
AP	22	22*	—	—	RV	RV	RV	RV	RV	RV	RV	RV	—	—	—	—	—	—
Coaches	20	20*	—	—	—	RV	RV	RV	RV	RV	RV	RV	—	—	—	RV	RV	RV
CFP	Not released												—	—	—	—	—	Not released

== Personnel ==
2020 Utah Utes football team roster
Players
Coaches
Offense

Pos.	#	Name	Class
WR	1	Bryan Thompson	Jr
RB	3	Micah Bernard	Fr
WR	3	Tyrone Young-Smith	Sr
RB	5	Jordan Wilmore	So
RB	6	Devin Brumfield	Jr
QB	7	Cameron Rising	So
QB	8	Jake Bentley	Sr
QB	9	Cooper Justice	Fr
WR	10	Money Parks	Fr
QB	12	Drew Lisk	Sr
QB	14	Carter Robinson	Fr
QB	15	Nick Billoups	Fr
WR	17	Devaughn Vele	Fr
WR	18	Britain Covey	Jr
WR	21	Solomon Enis	Jr
RB	22	Ty Jordan	Fr
RB	24	Elvis Vakapuna	Fr
WR	25	Kyrese Rowan	Fr
WR	26	Maxwell Cotton	Fr
WR	27	Pierre Moudourou	Jr
WR	28	Robbie Colenzo	Fr
WR	29	Sebastian Macaluso	Fr
RB	31	Aaron Tapusoa	Sr
QB	34	Bryson Barnes	Fr
RB	34	Braedon Wissler	Fr
RB	35	Charlie Vincent	Fr
RB	37	Faysal Aden	Fr
TE	39	Joe Ludwig	Jr
TE	40	Ali'i Niumatalolo	Sr
TE	43	Mufi Hill-Hunt	Sr
TE	45	Samson Nacua	Sr
OL	50	Orlando Umana	Sr
OL	51	Keaton Bills	Fr
OL	53	Johnny Maea	So
OL	54	Paul Maile	So
OL	55	Nick Ford	Jr
OL	60	Shintaro Mann	Fr
OL	64	Marist Talavou	Fr
OL	68	Jaren Kump	Fr
OL	69	Simi Moala	So
OL	70	Hunter Lotulelei	Fr
OL	71	Braeden Daniels	So
OL	72	Luke Felix-Fualalo	Fr
OL	74	Jaxon Garcia	Fr
OL	76	London Bartholomew	Sr
OL	77	Bamidele Olaseni	Sr
OL	78	Sataoa Laumea	Fr
OL	79	Alex Harrison	Fr
TE	80	Brant Kuithe	Jr
WR	81	Connor O'Toole	Fr
WR	82	Dylan Slavens	Jr
WR	83	Cameron Gardner	So
WR	84	Dominique Thompson	So
TE	85	Soa Rosales	Fr
TE	86	Dalton Kincaid	Jr
TE	87	Thomas Yassmin	So
TE	88	Branden Anderson	Fr
TE	89	Cole Fotheringham	Jr
OL	94	Falcon Kaumatule	Fr

Defense

Pos.	#	Name	Class
LB	0	Devin Lloyd	Jr
CB	2	Aaron Lowe	So
CB	3	Drew Rawls	Fr
CB	4	JaTravis Broughton	So
CB	5	Caine Savage	Fr
S	6	Nate Ritchie	Fr
DE	7	Van Fillinger	Fr
CB	8	Clark Phillips III	Fr
LB	9	Sione Fotu	Fr
LB	10	Ethan Calvert	Fr
S	10	R. J. Hubert	Jr
S	11	Dakota Hansen	Jr
DE	12	Tyler Wegis	Fr
S	13	Kamo'i Latu	Fr
S	14	Ben Renfro	Fr
CB	15	Malone Mataele	So
S	16	Zemaiah Vaughn	Fr
DB	18	Ousmane Doumbia	Fr
S	19	Vonte Davis	Sr
LB	20	Jeremy Mercier	Jr
CB	23	Faybian Marks	Fr
CB	25	Kenzel Lawler	Fr
S	28	Jake Biggs	Fr
LB	29	Nephi Sewell	Jr
LB	30	Chris Wilson	Fr
CB	31	LaCarea Pleasant-Johnson	Fr
LB	32	Moroni Anae	Jr
S	38	Stone Azarcon	Jr
DT	41	Hauati Pututau	Sr
DE	42	Mika Tafua	Jr
DE	44	Xavier Carlton	Fr
DE	46	Miki Suguturaga	Fr
LB	47	Rob Bonar	Fr
DT	49	Pita Tonga	Sr
DT	50	Fua Pututau	So
LB	51	Samuelu Elisaia	Sr
DE	52	Max Miner	Fr
LB	54	Hayden Furey	So
LB	55	Andrew Mata'afa	So
DE	56	Tyler Gonzalez	So
DT	57	Eli Morrow	So
DE	58	Junior Tafuna	Fr
LB	59	Sione Tuha	Fr
DE	65	Tyler Gleed	Fr
DE	66	Gavin Nawahine	Fr
LB	81	Taniela Pututau	Fr
DE	90	Devin Kaufusi	Jr
DE	91	Blake Kuithe	So
DE	92	Maxs Tupai	Sr
DL	93	Semisi Lauaki	Fr
DT	95	Aliki Vimahi	Fr
DT	96	Tanoa Togiai	Fr
DT	98	Viane Moala	Sr
DL	99	Tennessee Pututau	Fr

Special teams

Pos.	#	Name	Class
K	22	Jordan Noyes	Fr
P	33	Ben Lennon	So
K	36	Skylar Southam	Jr
P	37	Jared March	Fr
LS	48	Noah Rodriguez-Trammell	Jr
K/P	61	Tanner Cragun	Fr
LS	93	Keegan Markgraf	Sr
K	97	Jadon Redding	So

Head coach

- Kyle Whittingham

Coordinators/assistant coaches

- Morgan Scalley – Defensive coordinator/safeties
- Andy Ludwig – Offensive coordinator/quarterbacks
- Jim Harding – Assistant head coach/offensive line
- Sharrieff Shah – Special teams coordinator/cornerbacks
- Freddie Whittingham – Tight ends/recruiting coordinator
- Guy Holliday – Wide receivers
- Kiel McDonald – Running backs
- Sione Po'uha – Defensive tackles
- Lewis Powell – Defensive ends
- Colton Swan – Linebackers
- Ryan Blakney – Offensive Analyst
- Vince Conti – Offensive Analyst
- Ryan Lindley – Offensive Analyst
- Dom Conti – Special Teams Analyst
- J. J. Dielman – Offensive Graduate Assistant
- D. J. Gillins – Offensive Graduate Assistant
- Justin Mallgrav – Defensive Graduate Assistant

Legend

- (C) Team captain
- (S) Suspended
- (I) Ineligible
- Injured
- Redshirt

Roster
Last update: 4/27/23

== Game summaries ==
=== No. 20 USC ===
No. 20 USC Trojans at Utah Utes – Game summary

Quarter	1	2	3	4	Total
No. 20 Trojans	3	21	6	3	33
Utes	3	14	0	0	17

at Rice–Eccles Stadium, Salt Lake City, Utah

- Date: November 21
- Game time: 8:30 p.m. MST
- Game weather: Clear, 35 °F (2 °C)
- Game attendance: 0
- Referee: M. Mothershed
- TV announcers (ESPN): Dave Flemming, Rod Gilmore, Stormy Buonantony
- Box score, Recap

Game information
First quarter
- UTAH – Jadon Redding 36-yard field goal, 9:07. Utes 3–0. Drive: 7 plays, 42 yards, 3:06.
- USC – Parker Lewis 35-yard field goal, 5:17. Tied 3–3. Drive: 11 plays, 63 yards, 3:50.

Second quarter

- USC – Vavae Malepeai 2-yard run (Parker Lewis kick), 14:04. Trojans 10–3. Drive: 2 plays, 4 yards, 0:41
- UTAH – Nephi Sewell 23-yard fumble return (Jadon Redding kick), 11:53. Tied 10–10.
- USC – Tyler Vaughns 8-yard pass from Kedon Slovis (Parker Lewis kick), 9:28. Trojans 17–10. Drive: 7 plays, 75 yards, 2:25.
- USC – Erik Krommenhoek 10-yard pass from Kedon Slovis (Parker Lewis kick), 5:45. Trojans 24–10. Drive: 4 plays, 40 yards, 1:29.
- UTAH – Samson Nacua 7-yard pass from Jake Bentley (Jadon Redding kick), 0:49. Trojans 24–17. Drive: 9 plays, 75 yards, 4:56.

Third quarter

- USC – Parker Lewis 24-yard field goal, 9:32. Trojans 27–17. Drive: 11 plays, 74 yards, 5:28.
- USC – Parker Lewis 43-yard field goal, 4:47. Trojans 30–17. Drive: 8 plays, 62 yards, 3:56.

Fourth quarter

- USC – Parker Lewis 47-yard field goal, 1:03. Trojans 33–17. Drive: 4 plays, -3 yards, 0:26.

Statistics	USC	UTAH
First downs	17	17
Total yards	357	327
Rushing yards	93	111
Passing yards	264	216
Turnovers	2	5
Time of possession	30:41	29:19

Team	Category	Player	Statistics
USC	Passing	Kedon Slovis	24/35, 264 yards, 2 TD, INT
USC	Rushing	Vavae Malepeai	20 rushes, 62 yards, TD
USC	Receiving	Bru McCoy	5 receptions, 66 yards
Utah	Passing	Jake Bentley	16/28, 171 yards, TD, 2 INT
Utah	Rushing	Ty Jordan	7 rushes, 32 yards
Utah	Receiving	Bryan Thompson	2 receptions, 48 yards

=== At Washington ===
Utah Utes at Washington Huskies – Game summary

Quarter	1	2	3	4	Total
Utes	7	14	0	0	21
Huskies	0	0	17	7	24

at Husky Stadium, Seattle, Washington

- Date: November 28
- Game time: 5:30 p.m. MST / 4:30 p.m. PST
- Game weather: Mostly cloudy, 47 °F (8 °C)
- Game attendance: 259
- Referee: Mark Duddy
- TV announcers (ABC): Beth Mowins, Kirk Morrison, and Stormy Buonantony
- Box score, Recap

Game information
First quarter
- UTAH – Jake Bentley 7-yard run (Jadon Redding kick), 2:18. Utes 7–0. Drive: 9 plays, 48 yards, 5:40.

Second quarter

- UTAH – Devin Brumfield 2-yard run (Jadon Redding kick), 7:55. Utes 14–0. Drive: 5 plays, 59 yards, 2:30.
- UTAH – Bryan Thompson 13-yard pass from Jake Bentley (Jadon Redding kick), 0:42. Utes 21–0. Drive: 8 plays, 78 yards, 3:09.

Third quarter

- WASH – Kamari Pleasant 2-yard run (Peyton Henry kick), 12:01. Utes 21–7. Drive: 6 plays, 72 yards, 2:59.
- WASH – Peyton Henry 26-yard field goal, 7:21. Utes 21–10. Drive: 7 plays, 19 yards, 2:41.
- WASH – Cade Otton 21-yard pass from Dylan Morris (Peyton Henry kick), 2:49. Utes 21–17. Drive: 3 plays, 58 yards, 1:06.

Fourth quarter

- WASH – Cade Otton 16-yard pass from Dylan Morris (Peyton Henry kick), 0:36. Huskies 24–21. Drive: 12 plays, 88 yards, 3:55.

Statistics	UTAH	WASH
First downs	19	20
Total yards	359	360
Rushing yards	215	88
Passing yards	144	272
Turnovers	4	3
Time of possession	34:24	25:36

Team	Category	Player	Statistics
Utah	Passing	Jake Bentley	16/23, 144 yards, TD, 2 INT
Utah	Rushing	Ty Jordan	10 rushes, 97 yards
Utah	Receiving	Bryan Thompson	3 receptions, 65 yards, TD
Washington	Passing	Dylan Morris	23/38, 272 yards, 2 TD, 3 INT
Washington	Rushing	Sean McGrew	7 rushes, 36 yards
Washington	Receiving	Cade Otton	8 receptions, 108 yards, 2 TD

=== Oregon State ===
Oregon State Beavers at Utah Utes – Game summary

Quarter	1	2	3	4	Total
Beavers	0	10	0	14	24
Utes	6	10	7	7	30

at Rice–Eccles Stadium, Salt Lake City, Utah

- Date: December 5, 2020
- Game time: 8:30 p.m. MST
- Game weather: Clear, 30 °F (−1 °C)
- Game attendance: 0
- Referee: Mike McCabe
- TV: ESPN
- Box score, Recap

Game information

First quarter

- UTAH – Jadon Redding 33-yard field goal, 10:21. Utes 3–0. Drive: 9 plays, 60 yards, 4:39.
- UTAH – Jadon Redding 20-yard field goal, 6:50. Utes 6–0. Drive: 4 plays, 8 yards, 1:31.

Second quarter

- UTAH – Jadon Redding 27-yard field goal, 12:27. Utes 9–0. Drive: 11 plays, 60 yards, 5:12.
- ORST – Everett Hayes 33-yard field goal, 9:16. Utes 9–3. Drive: 7 plays, 54 yards, 3:05.
- UTAH – Ty Jordan 1-yard run (Jadon Redding kick), 3:10. Utes 16–3. Drive: 10 plays, 75 yards, 6:06.
- ORST – Calvin Tyler Jr. 1-yard run (Everett Hayes kick), 0:50. Utes 16–10. Drive: 9 plays, 75 yards, 2:20.

Third quarter

- UTAH – Britain Covey 8-yard pass from Jake Bentley (Jadon Redding kick), 6:22. Utes 23–10. Drive: 14 plays, 89 yards, 7:45.

Fourth quarter

- UTAH – Britain Covey 64-yard punt return (Jadon Redding kick), 14:37. Utes 30–10.
- ORST – Calvin Tyler Jr. 6-yard run (Everett Hayes kick), 11:50. Utes 30–17. Drive: 8 plays, 65 yards, 2:41.
- ORST – Kolby Taylor 21-yard pass from Chance Nolan (Everett Hayes kick), 5:07. Utes 30–24. Drive: 9 plays, 61 yards, 2:11.

Statistics	ORST	UTAH
First downs	22	21
Total yards	335	403
Rushing yards	133	229
Passing yards	202	174
Turnovers	1	0
Time of possession	24:15	35:45

Team	Category	Player	Statistics
Oregon State	Passing	Chance Nolan	20/38, 202 yards, TD, INT
Oregon State	Rushing	Jack Colletto	1 rush, 40 yards
Oregon State	Receiving	Tyjon Lindsey	3 receptions, 37 yards
Utah	Passing	Jack Bentley	18/27, 174 yards, TD
Utah	Rushing	Ty Jordan	27 rushes, 167 yards, TD
Utah	Receiving	Brant Kuithe	8 receptions, 76 yards

=== At No. 21 Colorado ===
Utah Utes at No. 21 Colorado Buffaloes – Game summary

Quarter	1	2	3	4	Total
Utes	7	3	14	14	38
No. 21 Buffaloes	0	14	7	0	21

at Folsom Field, Boulder, Colorado

- Date: December 12
- Game time: 10:00 a.m. MST
- Game weather: Cloudy, 23 °F (−5 °C)
- Game attendance: 0
- Referee: Mike McCabe
- TV: Fox
- Box Score, Recap

Game information
First quarter
- UTAH – Solomon Enis 7-yard pass from Jack Bentley (Jadon Redding kick), 12:03. Utes 7–0. Drive: 6 plays, 60 yards, 2:57.

Second quarter

- COLO – Maurice Bell 21-yard pass from Sam Noyer (Evan Price kick), 12:46. Tied 7–7. Drive: 11 plays, 90 yards, 3:33.
- COLO – Brenden Rice 81-yard punt return (Evan Price kick), 1:30. Buffaloes 14–7.
- UTAH – Jadon Redding 42-yard field goal, 0:00. Buffaloes 14–10. Drive: 3 plays, 15 yards, 0:13.

Third quarter

- COLO – Brenden Rice 61-yard pass from Sam Noyer (Evan Price kick), 14:39. Buffaloes 21–10. Drive: 1 play, 61 yards, 0:11.
- UTAH – Ty Jordan 18-yard run (Jadon Redding kick), 13:14. Buffaloes 21–17. Drive: 3 plays, 60 yards, 1:25.
- UTAH – Britain Covey 20-yard pass from Jack Bentley (Jadon Redding kick), 6:23. Utes 24–21. Drive: 10 plays, 80 yards, 5:28.

Fourth quarter

- UTAH – Jadon Redding 43-yard field goal, 9:19. Utes 27–21. Drive: 7 plays, 28 yards, 3:49.
- UTAH – Ty Jordan 66-yard run (Jack Bentley pass to Dalton Kincaid), 4:43. Utes 35–21. Drive: 1 play, 66 yards, 0:11.
- UTAH – Jadon Redding 38-yard field goal, 2:24. Utes 38–21. Drive: 4 plays, -2 yards, 1:52.

Statistics	UTAH	COLO
First downs	22	15
Total yards	432	377
Rushing yards	192	110
Passing yards	240	267
Turnovers	1	3
Time of possession	36:11	23:49

Team	Category	Player	Statistics
Utah	Passing	Jack Bentley	20/32, 240 yards, 2 TD, INT
Utah	Rushing	Ty Jordan	17 rushes, 147 yards, 2 TD
Utah	Receiving	Britain Covey	9 receptions, 76 yards, TD
Colorado	Passing	Sam Noyer	16/34, 258 yards, 2 TD, INT
Colorado	Rushing	Jarek Broussard	14 rushes, 80 yards
Colorado	Receiving	Brenden Rice	1 reception, 61 yards, TD

=== Washington State ===
Washington State Cougars at Utah Utes – Game summary

Quarter	1	2	3	4	Total
Cougars	7	21	0	0	28
Utes	0	7	14	24	45

at Rice–Eccles Stadium, Salt Lake City, Utah

- Date: December 19
- Game time: 11:30 a.m. MST
- Game weather: Partly cloudy, 38 °F (3 °C)
- Game attendance: 0
- Referee: Mark Duddy
- TV: FS1
- Box score, Recap

Game information
First quarter
- WSU – Max Borghi 8-yard run (Blake Mazza kick), 4:34. Cougars 7–0. Drive: 7 plays, 57 yards, 4:26.

Second quarter

- WSU – Deon McIntosh 11-yard run (Blake Mazza kick), 8:31. Cougars 14–0. Drive: 7 plays, 88 yards, 4:01.
- UTAH – Britain Covey 91-yard pass from Jake Bentley (Jadon Redding kick), 3:37. Cougars 14–7. Drive: 3 plays, 95 yards, 0:58.
- WSU – Jamire Calvin 8-yard pass from Jayden de Laura (Blake Mazza kick), 1:51. Cougars 21–7. Drive: 4 plays, 75 yards, 1:46.
- WSU – Jayden de Laura 3-yard run (Blake Mazza kick), 1:21. Cougars 28–7. Drive: 1 play, 3 yards, 0:04.

Third quarter

- UTAH – Ty Jordan 5-yard run (Jadon Redding kick), 6:09. Cougars 28–14. Drive: 9 plays, 81 yards, 4:39.
- UTAH – Bryan Thompson 9-yard run (Jadon Redding kick), 0:55. Cougars 28–21. Drive: 8 plays, 68 yards, 3:38.

Fourth quarter

- UTAH – Ty Jordan 33-yard run (Jadon Redding kick), 12:01. Tied 28–28. Drive: 7 plays, 70 yards, 2:15.
- UTAH – Ty Jordan 13-yard run (Jadon Redding kick), 6:29. Utes 35–28. Drive: 2 plays, 13 yards, 0:12.
- UTAH – Jadon Redding 44-yard field goal, 2:37. Utes 38–28. Drive: 7 plays, 30 yards, 3:37.
- UTAH – Clark Phillips III 36-yard interception return (Jadon Redding kick), 2:06. Utes 45–28.

Statistics	WSU	UTAH
First downs	17	23
Total yards	396	528
Rushing yards	115	223
Passing yards	281	305
Turnovers	4	3
Time of possession	29:00	31:00

Team	Category	Player	Statistics
Washington State	Passing	Jayden de Laura	17/28, 204 yards, TD, INT
Washington State	Rushing	Max Borghi	10 rushes, 95 yards, TD
Washington State	Receiving	Jamire Calvin	7 receptions, 104 yards, TD
Utah	Passing	Jack Bentley	7/14, 153 yards, TD, INT
Utah	Rushing	Ty Jordan	22 rushes, 154 yards, 3 TD
Utah	Receiving	Britain Covey	6 receptions, 134 yards, TD
