= 2020 Colorado Buffaloes football team =

American college football season

2020 Colorado Buffaloes football

Alamo Bowl, L 23–55 vs. Texas
- Conference: Pac-12 Conference
- South Division
- Record: 4–2 (3–1 Pac-12)
- Head coach: Karl Dorrell (1st season)
- Offensive coordinator: Darrin Chiaverini (1st season)
- Offensive scheme: Pro-style
- Defensive coordinator: Tyson Summers (2nd season)
- Base defense: 4–3
- Home stadium: Folsom Field

Uniform
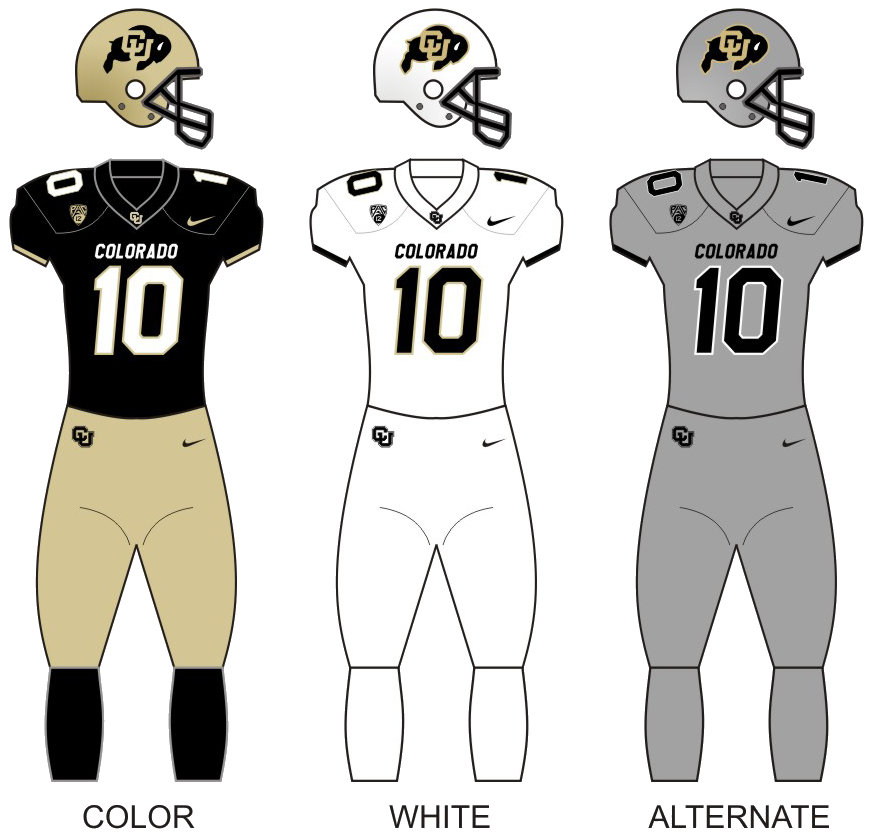

2020 Pac-12 Conference football standings
	Conf.			Overall
Team	W		L	W		L
North Division
Washington x	3	–	1	3	–	1
Oregon y$	3	–	2	4	–	3
Stanford	4	–	2	4	–	2
California	1	–	3	1	–	3
Washington State	1	–	3	1	–	3
Oregon State	2	–	5	2	–	5
South Division
No. 21 USC xy	5	–	0	5	–	1
Colorado	3	–	1	4	–	2
Utah	3	–	2	3	–	2
Arizona State	2	–	2	2	–	2
UCLA	3	–	4	3	–	4
Arizona	0	–	5	0	–	5
Championship: Oregon 31, USC 24
$ – Conference champion; x – Division champion/co-champions; y – Championship game participant; Note: Due to COVID-19, the Pac-12 suspended the season on August 11, but later decided to begin play on November 6. In addition to the title game on December 18, the conference seeded all remaining teams for a game during that weekend.; Rankings from AP Poll.

The 2020 Colorado Buffaloes football team represented the University of Colorado Boulder during the 2020 NCAA Division I FBS football season. The Buffaloes were led by first-year lead coach Karl Dorrell and played their home games on campus at Folsom Field as a member of the South Division of the Pac-12 Conference.

On August 11, 2020, the Pac-12 Conference suspended all fall sports competitions due to the COVID-19 pandemic. On September 3, the Pac-12 announced a resumption of the 2020 football season featuring a seven-game conference-only schedule, starting on November 7 and ending with the Pac-12 Championship game on December 18.

== Schedule ==
Colorado had games scheduled against Colorado State, Fresno State and Texas A&M. These games were canceled on July 10, due to the Pac-12 Conference's decision to play a conference-only schedule due to the COVID-19 pandemic.

On November 26, Colorado's scheduled game at USC for November 28 was canceled after a COVID-19 outbreak within the USC program. The Pac-12 then announced that Colorado would instead play San Diego State in a non-conference game at home on November 28.

Original 2020 Colorado Buffaloes schedule
Date	Opponent	Site
September 5	at Colorado State*	Canvas Stadium • Fort Collins, CO (Rocky Mountain Showdown)
September 12	Fresno State*	Folsom Field • Boulder, CO
September 19	at Texas A&M*	Kyle Field • College Station, TX
September 26	Oregon	Folsom Field • Boulder, CO
October 9	at Arizona	Arizona Stadium • Tucson, AZ
October 17	UCLA	Folsom Field • Boulder, CO
October 24	Arizona State	Folsom Field • Boulder, CO
October 31	at USC	Los Angeles Memorial Coliseum • Los Angeles, CA
November 7	Washington State	Folsom Field • Boulder, CO
November 14	at Stanford	Stanford Stadium • Stanford, CA
November 21	at Washington	Husky Stadium • Seattle, WA
November 28	Utah	Folsom Field • Boulder, CO (Rumble in the Rockies)

Date	Time	Opponent	Rank	Site	TV	Result	Attendance
November 7	5:00 p.m.	UCLA		Folsom Field; Boulder, CO	ESPN2	W 48–42	554
November 14	1:30 p.m.	at Stanford		Stanford Stadium; Stanford, CA	ESPN	W 35–32	—
~~November 21~~	~~8:00 p.m.~~	~~Arizona State~~		~~Folsom Field~~; ~~Boulder, CO~~	~~ESPN2~~	No Contest	
November 28	3:00 p.m.	San Diego State*		Folsom Field; Boulder, CO	P12N	W 20–10	—
December 5	5:00 p.m.	at Arizona		Arizona Stadium; Tucson, AZ	FS1	W 24–13	—
December 12	10:00 a.m.	Utah	No. 21	Folsom Field; Boulder, CO (Rumble in the Rockies)	FOX	L 21–38	—
~~December 19~~	~~7:00 p.m.~~	vs. ~~Oregon~~	No. 25	~~Los Angeles Memorial Coliseum~~; ~~Los Angeles, CA~~	~~FS1~~	No Contest	
December 29	7:00 p.m.	vs. No. 20 Texas*		Alamodome; San Antonio, TX (Alamo Bowl)	ESPN	L 23–55	10,822
*Non-conference game; Rankings from AP Poll and CFP Rankings after November 24 released prior to game; All times are in Mountain time

== Coaching staff ==
Name	Title
Karl Dorrell	Head coach
Darrin Chiaverini	Offensive coordinator/wide receivers coach
Tyson Summers	Defensive coordinator/inside linebackers coach
Taylor Embree	Tight ends coach
Darian Hagan	Running backs coach
Danny Langsdorf	Pass game coordinator/ quarterbacks coach
Demetrice Martin	Cornerbacks coach
Brett Maxie	Safeties coach
Brian Michalowski	Outside linebackers coach
Mitch Rodrigue	Offensive line coach
Chris Wilson	Defensive line coach

== Awards and honors ==
=== Weekly awards ===
Date	Week	Award	Player	Position
Nov. 9	1	Pac-12 Offensive Player of the Week	Jarek Broussard	RB
Nov. 16	2	Pac-12 Offensive Player of the Week	Sam Noyer	QB
Nov. 16	2	Pac-12 Defensive Player of the Week	Nate Landman	LB
Nov. 29	9 (Note: National week numbering)	Walter Camp National Defensive Player of the Week	Nate Landman	LB
Nov. 30	4	Pac-12 Defensive Player of the Week	Nate Landman (2)	LB
Dec. 7	5	Pac-12 Offensive Player of the Week	Jarek Broussard (2)	RB

=== End of year awards ===
==== Individual ====
- Jarek Broussard - Pac-12 Offensive Player of the Year
- Karl Dorrell - Pac-12 Coach of the Year
- Brenden Rice - Pac-12 Freshman Offensive Player of the Year Honorable Mention
- Christian Gonzalez - Pac-12 Defensive Player of the Year Honorable Mention

==== All-Pac-12 Team ====
1st Team

- Jarek Broussard (RB)
- Nate Landman (LB)

2nd Team

- Sam Noyer (QB)
- Will Sherman (OL)
- Mustafa Johnson (DL)
- Jaylen Jackson (ST)

Honorable mention

- Frank Fillip (OL)
- Terrance Lang (DL)
- Isaiah Lewis (DB)
- Casey Roddick (OL)
- Dimitri Stanley (WR)
- Carson Wells (LB)

== Players drafted into the NFL ==
Round	Pick	Player	Position	NFL Club
6	197	Will Sherman	OT	New England Patriots
