= 2020 Stanford Cardinal football team =

American college football season

2020 Stanford Cardinal football
- Conference: Pac-12 Conference
- North Division
- Record: 4–2 (4–2 Pac-12)
- Head coach: David Shaw (10th season)
- Offensive coordinator: Tavita Pritchard (3rd season)
- Offensive scheme: Multiple
- Defensive coordinator: Lance Anderson (7th season)
- Base defense: 3–4
- Home stadium: Stanford Stadium

Uniform
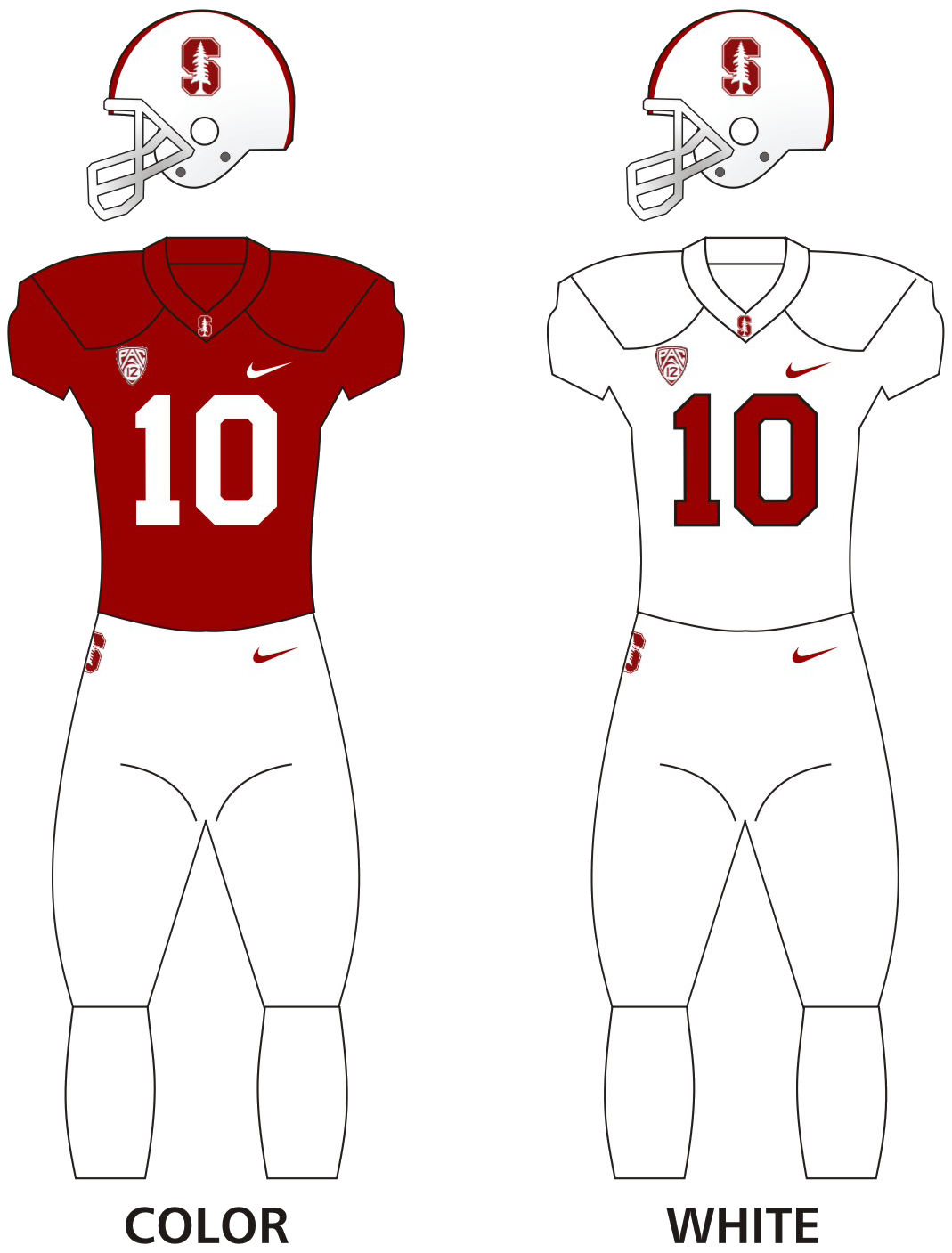

2020 Pac-12 Conference football standings
	Conf.			Overall
Team	W		L	W		L
North Division
Washington x	3	–	1	3	–	1
Oregon y$	3	–	2	4	–	3
Stanford	4	–	2	4	–	2
California	1	–	3	1	–	3
Washington State	1	–	3	1	–	3
Oregon State	2	–	5	2	–	5
South Division
No. 21 USC xy	5	–	0	5	–	1
Colorado	3	–	1	4	–	2
Utah	3	–	2	3	–	2
Arizona State	2	–	2	2	–	2
UCLA	3	–	4	3	–	4
Arizona	0	–	5	0	–	5
Championship: Oregon 31, USC 24
$ – Conference champion; x – Division champion/co-champions; y – Championship game participant; Note: Due to COVID-19, the Pac-12 suspended the season on August 11, but later decided to begin play on November 6. In addition to the title game on December 18, the conference seeded all remaining teams for a game during that weekend.; Rankings from AP Poll.

The 2020 Stanford Cardinal football team represented Stanford University in the 2020 NCAA Division I FBS football season. The Cardinal were led by tenth-year head coach David Shaw. They played their home games at Stanford Stadium as members of the North Division of the Pac-12 Conference.

On August 11, the Pac-12 Conference initially canceled all fall sports competitions due to the COVID-19 pandemic. On September 24, the conference announced that a six-game conference-only season would begin on November 6, with the Pac-12 Championship Game to be played December 18. Teams not selected for the championship game would be seeded to play a seventh game.

On December 13, with a record of 3-2 and one game left to play, the program announced that it would not participate in any bowl game. The Cardinal won their final game, finishing their season with a 4-2 record.

== Pac-12 media day ==
=== Pac-12 media poll ===
In the Pac-12 preseason media poll, Stanford was voted to finish fourth in the Pac-12 North division.

== Schedule ==
Stanford had games scheduled against William & Mary (September 5), Notre Dame (October 10), and BYU (November 28), but canceled these games on July 10 due to the Pac-12 Conference's decision to play a conference-only schedule due to the COVID-19 pandemic.

Original 2020 Stanford Cardinal schedule
Date	Opponent	Site
September 5	William & Mary*	Stanford Stadium • Stanford, CA
September 12	at Arizona	Arizona Stadium • Tucson, AZ
September 19	USC	Stanford Stadium • Stanford, CA (rivalry)
September 26	at UCLA	Rose Bowl • Pasadena, CA (rivalry)
October 10	at Notre Dame*	Notre Dame Stadium • Notre Dame, IN (rivalry)
October 17	Washington State	Stanford Stadium • Stanford, CA
October 24	at Oregon	Autzen Stadium • Eugene, OR (rivalry)
October 30	Oregon State	Stanford Stadium • Stanford, CA
November 7	at Washington	Husky Stadium • Seattle, WA
November 14	Colorado	Stanford Stadium • Stanford, CA
November 21	at California	California Memorial Stadium • Berkeley, CA (Big Game)
November 28	BYU*	Stanford Stadium • Stanford, CA

Date	Time	Opponent	Site	TV	Result	Attendance	Source
November 7	4:30 p.m.	at No. 12 Oregon	Autzen Stadium; Eugene, OR (rivalry)	ABC	L 14–35		
November 14	12:30 p.m.	Colorado	Stanford Stadium; Stanford, CA	ESPN	L 32–35		
November 21	8:00 p.m.	Washington State	Stanford Stadium; Stanford, CA	FS1	No contest		
November 27	1:30 p.m.	at California	California Memorial Stadium; Berkeley, CA (Big Game)	FOX	W 24–23		
December 5	1:00 p.m.	at No. 22 Washington	Husky Stadium; Seattle, WA	FOX	W 31–26	278	
December 12	7:30 p.m.	at Oregon State	Reser Stadium; Corvallis, OR	ESPNU	W 27–24		
December 19	4:00 p.m.	at UCLA	Rose Bowl; Pasadena, CA (rivalry)	ESPN	W 48–47 ^{2OT}	0	
Rankings from AP Poll released prior to the game; All times are in Pacific time

== Personnel ==
=== Coaching staff ===
Name	Position	Stanford years	Alma mater
David Shaw	Head coach	14th	Stanford (1994)
Lance Anderson	Defensive coordinator / outside linebackers coach	14th	Idaho State (1996)
Tavita Pritchard	Offensive coordinator/quarterbacks	8th	Stanford (2009)
Pete Alamar	Special teams coordinator	5th	Cal Lutheran (1983)
Ron Gould	Running backs coach	4th	Oregon (1987)
Morgan Turner	Tight ends coach	8th	Illinois (2009)
Kevin Carberry	Offensive line coach	4th	Ohio (2005)
Bobby Kennedy	Wide receivers coach	3rd	Northern Colorado (1989)
Duane Akina	Defensive backs coach	7th	Washington (1979)
Eric Sanders	Inside linebackers coach	1st	UC Davis (2005)
Diron Reynolds	Defensive linemen coach	4th	Wake Forest (1994)

== Game summaries ==
=== At Oregon ===
Stanford Cardinal vs. Oregon Ducks – Game summary

Quarter	1	2	3	4	Total
Cardinal	7	0	0	7	14
No. 12 Ducks	7	7	14	7	35

at Autzen Stadium • Eugene, Oregon

- Date: November 7, 2020
- Game time: 4:30 p.m. PST
- Game weather: Cloudy, 46 °F (8 °C)
- Game attendance: 0
- Referee: Michael Mothershed
- TV: ABC
- Reference

Game information

First quarter

- STAN – Austin Jones 4-yard run (Jet Toner kick), 3:25. Stanford 7–0. Drive: 9 plays, 80 yards, 5:30.
- ORE – C. J. Verdell 10-yard run (Camden Lewis kick), 0:54. Tied 7–7. Drive: 7 plays, 87 yards, 2:31.

Second quarter

- ORE – D. J. Johnson 5-yard pass from Tyler Shough (Camden Lewis kick), 1:05. Oregon 14–7. Drive: 10 plays, 96 yards, 3:59.

Third quarter

- ORE – Travis Dye 14-yard run (Camden Lewis kick), 11:13. Oregon 21–7. Drive: 9 plays, 75 yards, 3:47.
- ORE – Tyler Shough 9-yard run (Camden Lewis kick), 0:53. Oregon 28–7. Drive: 10 plays, 80 yards, 3:57.

Fourth quarter

- STAN – Austin Jones 2-yard run (Jet Toner kick), 7:39. Oregon 28–14. Drive: 3 plays, 80 yards, 1:32.
- ORE – Cyrus Habibi-Likio 4-yard run (Camden Lewis kick), 3:37. Oregon 35–14. Drive: 9 plays, 73 yards, 4:02.

Top passers

- STAN – Jack West – 13/19, 154 yards
- ORE – Tyler Shough – 17/26, 227 yards, TD, int

Top rushers

- STAN – Austin Jones – 20 rushes, 100 yards, 2 TD
- ORE – C. J. Verdell – 20 rushes, 105 yards, TD

Top receivers

- STAN – Simi Fehoko – 3 receptions, 88 yards
- ORE – Johnny Johnson III – 4 receptions, 60 yards

=== Colorado ===
Colorado Buffaloes vs. Stanford Cardinal – Game summary

Quarter	1	2	3	4	Total
Buffaloes	7	7	14	7	35
Cardinal	3	6	7	16	32

at Stanford Stadium • Stanford, California

- Date: November 14, 2020
- Game time: 12:30 p.m. PST
- Game weather: Overcast, 50 °F (10 °C)
- Game attendance: 1
- Referee: Francisco Villar
- TV: ESPN
- Reference

Game information

First quarter

- STAN – Jet Toner 48-yard field goal, 11:45. Stanford 3–0. Drive: 7 plays, 37 yards, 3:15.
- COLO – Dimitri Stanley 55-yard pass from Sam Noyer (Evan Price kick), 3:20. Colorado 7–3. Drive: 2 plays, 57 yards, 0:40.

Second quarter

- STAN – Jet Toner 33-yd field goal, 14:13. Colorado 7–6. Drive: 8 plays, 55 yards, 4:07.
- COLO – Sam Noyer 7-yard run (Evan Price kick), 9:36. Colorado 14–6. Drive: 10 plays, 75 yards, 4:37.
- STAN – Jet Toner 28-yard field goal, 4:38. Colorado 14–9. Drive: 8 plays, 63 yards, 4:58.

Third quarter

- COLO – Sam Noyer 10-yard run (Evan Price kick), 11:32. Colorado 21–9. Drive: 9 plays, 75 yards, 3:28.
- COLO – Brenden Rice 34-yard pass from Sam Noyer (Evan Price kick), 8:55. Colorado 28–9. Drive: 3 plays, 61 yards, 1:09.
- STAN – Davis Mills 2-yard run (Jet Toner kick), 4:35. Colorado 28–16. Drive: 9 plays, 82 yards, 4:20.

Fourth quarter

- COLO – Jaren Mangham 2-yard run (Evan Price kick), 14:58. Colorado 35–16. Drive: 10 plays, 80 yards, 4:37.
- STAN – Austin Jones 2-yard run (Davis Mills–Connor Wedington pass), 8:45. Colorado 35–24. Drive: 11 plays, 73 yards, 3:08.
- STAN – Scooter Harrington 1-yard pass from Davis Mills (Davis Mills–Tucker Fisk pass), 2:34. Colorado 35–32. Drive: 13 plays, 80 yards, 3:15.

Top passers

- COLO – Sam Noyer – 15/24, 255 yards, 2 TD, int
- STAN – Davis Mills – 31/56, 327 yards, TD

Top rushers

- COLO – Jarek Broussard – 27 rushes, 121 yards
- STAN – Davis Mills – 6 rushes, 36 yards, TD

Top receivers

- COLO – Dimitri Stanley – 6 receptions, 126 yards, TD
- STAN – Michael Wilson – 6 receptions, 95 yards

=== At California ===
Stanford Cardinal vs. California Golden Bears – Game summary

Quarter	1	2	3	4	Total
Cardinal	0	10	14	0	24
Golden Bears	7	3	7	6	23

at California Memorial Stadium • Berkeley, California

- Date: November 27, 2020
- Game time: 1:30 p.m. PST
- Game weather: Clear, 64 °F (18 °C)
- Game attendance: 0
- Referee: Matt Richards
- TV announcers (FOX): Alex Faust and Petros Papadakis
- Reference

Game information

First quarter

- CAL – Kekoa Crawford 7-yard pass from Chase Garbers (Dario Longhetto kick), 10:32. California 7–0. Drive: 8 plays, 75 yards, 4:28.

Second quarter

- STAN – Jet Toner 27-yard field goal, 14:55. California 7–3. Drive: 8 plays, 48 yards, 4:29.
- CAL – Dario Longhetto 24-yard field goal, 10:15. California 10–3. Drive: 9 plays, 68 yards, 4:40.
- STAN – Michael Wilson 11-yard pass from Davis Mills (Jet Toner kick), 3:09. Tied 10–10. Drive: 3 plays, 16 yards, 0:57.

Third quarter

- STAN – Austin Jones 2-yard run (Jet Toner kick), 10:57. Stanford 17–10. Drive: 3 plays, 41 yards, 1:00.
- CAL – Nikko Remigio 3-yard pass from Chase Garbers (Dario Longhetto kick), 9:13. Tied 17–17. Drive: 6 plays, 75 yards, 1:44.
- STAN – Austin Jones 8-yard run (Jet Toner kick), 1:51. Stanford 24–17. Drive: 8 plays, 71 yards, 4:28.

Fourth quarter

- CAL – Christopher Brooks Jr. 3-yard run (kick blocked), 0:58. Stanford 24–23. Drive: 14 plays, 90 yards, 3:30.

Top passers

- STAN – Davis Mills – 24/32, 205 yards, TD
- CAL – Chase Garbers – 19/29, 151 yards, 2 TD

Top rushers

- STAN – Austin Jones – 21 rushes, 85 yards, 2 TD
- CAL – Damien Moore – 10 rushes, 121 yards

Top receivers

- STAN – Michael Wilson – 7 receptions, 88 yards, TD
- CAL – Kekoa Crawford – 5 receptions, 52 yards, TD

=== At Washington ===
Stanford Cardinal vs. Washington Huskies – Game summary

Quarter	1	2	3	4	Total
Cardinal	14	10	7	0	31
No. 22 Huskies	0	3	13	10	26

at Husky Stadium • Seattle, Washington

- Date: December 5, 2020
- Game time: 1:00 p.m. PST
- Game weather: Sunny, 55 °F (13 °C)
- Game attendance: 278
- Referee: Michael Mothershed
- TV announcers (FOX): Joe Davis and Mark Helfrich
- Reference

Game information

First quarter

- STAN – Austin Jones 3-yard run (Jet Toner kick), 9:53. Stanford 7–0. Drive: 11 plays, 65 yards, 5:07.
- STAN – Austin Jones 1-yard run (Jet Toner kick), 2:05. Stanford 14–0. Drive: 9 plays, 80 yards, 4:34.

Second quarter

- UW – Peyton Henry 23-yard field goal, 11:59. Stanford 14–3. Drive: 13 plays, 71 yards, 5:06.
- STAN – Nathaniel Peat 3-yard run (Jet Toner kick), 6:54. Stanford 21–3. Drive: 9 plays, 64 yards, 5:05.
- STAN – Jet Toner 42-yard field goal, 0:00. Stanford 24–3. Drive: 14 plays, 61 yards, 3:09.

Third quarter

- UW – Sean McGrew 6-yard run (Peyton Henry kick), 12:20. Stanford 24–10. Drive: 7 plays, 75 yards, 2:40.
- STAN – Scooter Harrington 3-yard pass from Davis Mills (Jet Toner kick), 9:01. Stanford 31–10. Drive: 7 plays, 69 yards, 3:19.
- UW – Dylan Morris 1-yard run (kick blocked), 2:33. Stanford 31–16. Drive: 12 plays, 75 yards, 6:28.

Fourth quarter

- UW – Sean McGrew 2-yard run (Peyton Henry kick), 11:03. Stanford 31–23. Drive: 9 plays, 92 yards, 4:11.
- UW – Peyton Henry 45-yard field goal, 7:54. Stanford 31–26. Drive: 4 plays, -17 yards, 2:11.

Top passers

- STAN – Davis Mills – 20/30, 252 yards, TD
- UW – Dylan Morris – 15/23, 254 yards

Top rushers

- STAN – Austin Jones – 31 rushes, 138 yards, 2 TD
- UW – Sean McGrew – 16 rushes, 65 yards, 2 TD

Top receivers

- STAN – Simi Fehoko – 4 receptions, 61 yards
- UW – Ty Jones – 2 receptions, 79 yards

=== At Oregon State ===
Stanford Cardinal vs. Oregon State Beavers – Game summary

Quarter	1	2	3	4	Total
Cardinal	6	3	7	11	27
Beavers	7	7	7	3	24

at Reser Stadium • Corvallis, OR

- Date: December 12, 2020
- Game time: 7:00 p.m. PST
- Game weather: Cloudy, 36 °F (2 °C)
- Game attendance: 0
- Referee: Francisco Villar
- TV announcers (ESPNU): John Schriffen and Rene Ingoglia
- Reference

Game information

First quarter

- OSU – Tyjon Lindsey 18-yard pass from Chance Nolan (Everett Hayes kick), 9:46. Oregon State 7–0. Drive: 11 plays, 75 yards, 5:14.
- STAN – Tucker Fisk 12-yard pass from Davis Mills (pass failed), 5:45. Oregon State 7–6. Drive: 8 plays, 77 yards, 3:56.

Second quarter

- OSU – Zeriah Beason 8-yard pass from Chance Nolan (Everett Hayes kick), 12:34. Oregon State 14–6. Drive: 4 plays, 88 yards, 2:19.
- STAN – Jet Toner 47-yard field goal, 1:16. Oregon State 14–9. Drive: 7 plays, 57 yards, 1:14.

Third quarter

- STAN – Davis Mills 1-yard run (Jet Toner kick), 12:14. Stanford 16–14. Drive: 6 plays, 71 yards, 2:39.
- OSU – Tyjon Lindsey 30-yard pass from Chance Nolan (Everett Hayes kick), 8:38. Oregon State 21–16. Drive: 9 plays, 75 yards, 3:36.

Fourth quarter

- STAN – Davis Mills 6-yard run (Davis Mills–Houston Heimuli pass), 13:03. Stanford 24–21. Drive: 13 plays, 90 yards, 6:10.
- OSU – Everett Hayes 26-yard field goal, 7:18. Tied 24–24. Drive: 13 plays, 67 yards, 5:45.
- STAN – Jet Toner 39-yard field goal, 1:48. Stanford 27–24. Drive: 10 plays, 62 yards, 5:24.

Top passers

- STAN – Davis Mills – 21/29, 292 yards, TD
- OSU – Chance Nolan – 17/30, 221 yards, 3 TD

Top rushers

- STAN – Austin Jones – 22 rushes, 126 yards
- OSU – Jermar Jefferson – 18 rushes, 80 yards

Top receivers

- STAN – Simi Fehoko – 6 receptions, 110 yards
- OSU – Tre'Shaun Harrison – 5 receptions, 91 yards

=== At UCLA ===
Stanford Cardinal vs. UCLA Bruins – Game summary

Quarter	1	2	3	4	OT	2OT	Total
Cardinal	7	13	0	14	7	7	48
Bruins	3	0	14	17	7	6	47

at Rose Bowl Stadium • Pasadena, CA

- Date: December 19, 2020
- Game time: 4:05 p.m. PST
- Game weather: 68 °F (20 °C), Clear, Wind 5 MPH
- Game attendance: 0
- Referee: Michael Mothershed
- TV announcers (ESPN): Beth Mowins, Kirk Morrison, and Taylor McGregor

Game information

First quarter

- STAN – Austin Jones 1-yard run (Jet Toner kick), 7:02. Stanford 7–0. Drive: 7 plays, 61 yards, 3:54.
- UCLA – Nicholas Barr-Mira 31-yard field goal, 1:21. Stanford 7–3. Drive: 13 plays, 62 yards, 5:41.

Second quarter

- STAN – Isaiah Sanders 2-yard run (kick failed), 13:42. Stanford 13–3. Drive: 6 plays, 75 yards, 2:39.
- STAN – Austin Jones 1-yard run (Jet Toner kick), 0:16. Stanford 20–3. Drive: 8 plays, 80 yards, 1:45.

Third quarter

- UCLA – Keegan Jones 9-yard run (Nicholas Barr-Mira kick), 9:10. Stanford 20–10. Drive: 6 plays, 67 yards, 2:41.
- UCLA – Greg Dulcich 17-yard pass from Chase Griffin (Nicholas Barr-Mira kick), 3:07. Stanford 20–17. Drive: 9 plays, 60 yards, 4:12.

Fourth quarter

- UCLA – Chase Cota 23-yard pass from Chase Griffin (Nicholas Barr-Mira kick), 14:54. UCLA 24–20. Drive: 4 plays, 84 yards, 1:25.
- UCLA – Nicholas Barr-Mira 31-yard field goal, 6:28. UCLA 27–20. Drive: 10 plays, 46 yards, 4:30.
- UCLA – Jay Shaw 39-yard interception return (Nicholas Barr-Mira kick), 5:39. UCLA 34–20.
- STAN – Simi Fehoko 11-yard pass from Davis Mills (Jet Toner kick), 2:34. UCLA 34–27. Drive: 11 plays, 75 yards, 3:05.
- STAN – Simi Fehoko 21-yard pass from Davis Mills (Jet Toner kick), 0:18. Tied 34–34. Drive: 9 plays, 72 yards, 1:20.

First Overtime

- UCLA – Greg Dulcich 21-yard pass from Chase Griffin (Nicholas Barr-Mira kick). UCLA 41–34. Drive: 2 plays, 25 yards.
- STAN – Isaiah Sanders 3-yard run (Jet Toner kick). Tied 41–41. Drive: 7 plays, 25 yards.

Second Overtime

- STAN – Simi Fehoko 14-yard pass from Davis Mills (Jet Toner kick). Stanford 48–41. Drive: 3 plays, 25 yards.
- UCLA – Kyle Philips 21-yard pass from Chase Griffin (run failed). Stanford 48–47. Drive: 7 plays, 25 yards.

Top passers

- STAN – Davis Mills – 32/47, 428 yards, 3 TD, 3 int
- UCLA – Chase Griffin – 9/11, 127 yards, 4 TD

Top rushers

- STAN – Austin Jones – 23 rushes, 92 yards, 2 TD
- UCLA – Brittain Brown – 29 rushes, 219 yards

Top receivers

- STAN – Simi Fehoko – 16 receptions, 230 yards, 3 TD
- UCLA – Kyle Philips – 7 receptions, 61 yards, TD

== Rankings ==
Ranking movements Legend: ██ Increase in ranking ██ Decrease in ranking — = Not ranked RV = Received votes
	Week																	
Poll	Pre	1	2	3	4	5	6	7	8	9	10	11	12	13	14	15	16	Final
AP	—	—	—	—	—	—	—	—	—	—	—	—	—	—				
Coaches	RV	—	—	—	—	RV	RV	RV	RV	—	—	—	—	—				
CFP	Not released												—	—				Not released

== Players drafted into the NFL ==
Round	Pick	Player	Position	NFL club
2	45	Walker Little	OT	Jacksonville Jaguars
3	67	Davis Mills	QB	Houston Texans
3	76	Paulson Adebo	CB	New Orleans Saints
4	114	Drew Dalman	C	Atlanta Falcons
5	179	Simi Fehoko	WR	Dallas Cowboys
