= 2020 California Golden Bears football team =

American college football season

2020 California Golden Bears football
- Conference: Pac-12 Conference
- North Division
- Record: 1–3 (1–3 Pac-12)
- Head coach: Justin Wilcox (4th season)
- Offensive coordinator: Bill Musgrave (1st season)
- Offensive scheme: Spread option
- Defensive coordinator: Peter Sirmon (1st season)
- Co-defensive coordinator: Tim DeRuyter (1st as co-DC; 4th overall season)
- Base defense: 3–4
- Home stadium: California Memorial Stadium

2020 Pac-12 Conference football standings
	Conf.			Overall
Team	W		L	W		L
North Division
Washington x	3	–	1	3	–	1
Oregon y$	3	–	2	4	–	3
Stanford	4	–	2	4	–	2
California	1	–	3	1	–	3
Washington State	1	–	3	1	–	3
Oregon State	2	–	5	2	–	5
South Division
No. 21 USC xy	5	–	0	5	–	1
Colorado	3	–	1	4	–	2
Utah	3	–	2	3	–	2
Arizona State	2	–	2	2	–	2
UCLA	3	–	4	3	–	4
Arizona	0	–	5	0	–	5
Championship: Oregon 31, USC 24
$ – Conference champion; x – Division champion/co-champions; y – Championship game participant; Note: Due to COVID-19, the Pac-12 suspended the season on August 11, but later decided to begin play on November 6. In addition to the title game on December 18, the conference seeded all remaining teams for a game during that weekend.; Rankings from AP Poll.

The 2020 California Golden Bears football team represented the University of California, Berkeley during the 2020 NCAA Division I FBS football season. The team was led by head coach Justin Wilcox, in his fourth year as head coach. The team's offense was led by Bill Musgrave, who replaced Beau Baldwin; Baldwin left to become the head coach at Cal Poly.

On August 11, 2020, the Pac-12 Conference canceled all Fall 2020 sports competitions due to the COVID-19 pandemic. On September 24, it was announced that a seven-game season would be played in 2020, and the schedule was officially announced on October 3. Due to additional COVID-related game cancellations, the Bears ultimately only played four games and finished with a 1–3 record for the season, with the sole win coming against No. 23 ranked Oregon.

== Offseason ==
=== Position key ===
Back	B	Center	C	Cornerback	CB	Defensive back	DB
Defensive end	DE	Defensive lineman	DL	Defensive tackle	DT	End	E
Fullback	FB	Guard	G	Halfback	HB	Kicker	K
Kickoff returner	KR	Offensive tackle	OT	Offensive lineman	OL	Linebacker	LB
Long snapper	LS	Punter	P	Punt returner	PR	Quarterback	QB
Running back	RB	Safety	S	Tight end	TE	Wide receiver	WR

=== Offseason departures ===
Nine Golden Bears graduated in 2020, and three were selected in the 2020 NFL draft.

2020 California offseason departures
Name	Number	Pos.	Height	Weight	Year	Hometown	Notes
Ashtyn Davis	27	S	6'1	202	Senior	Santa Cruz, CA	Declared for NFL draft, drafted in the third round by New York Jets.
Jaylinn Hawkins	6	S	6'2	210	RS senior	Buena Park, CA	Declared for NFL draft, drafted in the fourth round by Atlanta Falcons.
Evan Weaver	89	LB	6'3	235	Senior	Spokane, WA	Declared for NFL draft, drafted in the sixth round by Arizona Cardinals.
Ricky Walker III	21	WR	5'11	190	Senior		Graduated
Colt Doughty	42	LB	6'1	230	Senior		Graduated
Trey Turner III	5	S	6'1	185	Senior		Graduated
Lone Toailoa	55	DE	6'2	290	Senior		Graduated
Chinedu Udeogu	91	TE	6'4	275	Senior		Graduate transfer to Illinois.
Gabe Siemieniec	46	PK	6'1	210	Senior		Graduate transfer to Louisiana Tech.
Greg Thomas	39	PK	5'9	165	Senior		Graduated

=== Recruiting ===
College recruiting
Name	Hometown	School	Height	Weight	Commit date
Jaden Casey; QB	Calabasas, CA	Calabasas High School	6 ft 1 in (1.85 m)	185 lb (84 kg)	Oct 14, 2019
Jaden Casey; QB	Recruit ratings: Rivals: 247Sports: ESPN:				
Jeremiah Hunter; WR	Fresno, CA	Central East High School	6 ft 2 in (1.88 m)	178 lb (81 kg)	May 11, 2019
Jeremiah Hunter; WR	Recruit ratings: Rivals: 247Sports: ESPN:				
Muelu Iosefa; OLB	Mililani, HI	Mililani High School	6 ft 3 in (1.91 m)	215 lb (98 kg)	Jun 11, 2019
Muelu Iosefa; OLB	Recruit ratings: Rivals: 247Sports: ESPN:				
Collin Gamble; CB	Argyle, TX	Liberty Christian High School	5 ft 10 in (1.78 m)	185 lb (84 kg)	Sep 22, 2019
Collin Gamble; CB	Recruit ratings: Rivals: 247Sports: ESPN:				
Overall recruit ranking: 247Sports: 39
Note: In many cases, Scout, Rivals, 247Sports, On3, and ESPN may conflict in their listings of height and weight.; In these cases, the average was taken. ESPN grades are on a 100-point scale.; Sources: "Rivals commits". Rivals.; "ESPN commits". ESPN.; "2020 Team Ranking". Rivals.com.; "247Sports commits". 247Sports.

== Preseason ==
On January 3, 2020, Cal announced that it would hire former Denver Broncos offensive coordinator Bill Musgrave as its next offensive coordinator, replacing Beau Baldwin. Musgrave, an Oregon alumnus like Wilcox, began his coaching career as quarterbacks coach for the Oakland Raiders in 1997. He last coached at the collegiate level as an offensive coordinator for Virginia in 2001–2002.

On January 10, Angus McClure was announced as the next offensive line coach. McClure spent 11 years at UCLA. Four days later, Aristotle Thompson was hired as the running backs coach. Thompson was the running backs coach at Cal Poly prior to being hired at Cal.

Cal's defensive line coach, Gerald Alexander, was hired to the same position by the Miami Dolphins on January 24. Cal announced it would hire former Arizona defensive coordinator Marcel Yates to replace him the following day.

On March 4, it was announced that Peter Sirmon would be made co-defensive coordinator alongside Tim DeRuyter.

=== Pac-12 media poll ===
In the 2020 Pac-12 preseason media poll, California was voted to finish in second place in the North Division.

Media poll (North Division)
Predicted finish	Team	Votes (1st place)
1	Oregon	222 (35)
2	California	176 (3)
3	Washington	161
4	Stanford	105
5	Oregon State	76
6	Washington State	58

== Schedule ==
Cal's 2020 regular season was announced on January 16. The Golden Bears had 3 games scheduled against UNLV, TCU, and Cal Poly, but canceled these games on July 10 due to the Pac-12 Conference's decision to play a conference-only schedule due to the COVID-19 pandemic.

On August 11, the Pac-12 Conference canceled all Fall 2020 sports competitions due to the COVID-19 pandemic. However, following an agreement that boosted testing capacity for players and personnel, the conference announced it would play a seven-game football schedule beginning in November. The schedule would see Cal play all five division opponents, Arizona State from the Pac-12 South division, and a season-closing game against the equally-ranked team in the opposite division (the division winners will play each other in the conference championship, while the team that finishes second in the North division plays the team that finishes second in the South division).

On November 13, Cal's scheduled game at Arizona State for November 14 was canceled after a COVID-19 outbreak within the Arizona State program. The Pac-12 then announced that Cal would instead play at UCLA on the morning of November 15; the Bruins' scheduled game against Utah had also been canceled after Utah had a COVID-19 outbreak.

Original 2020 California Golden Bears schedule
Date	Opponent	Site
August 29	at UNLV*	Allegiant Stadium • Paradise, NV
September 5	TCU*	California Memorial Stadium • Berkeley, CA
September 12	Cal Poly*	California Memorial Stadium • Berkeley, CA
September 26	Utah	California Memorial Stadium • Berkeley, CA
October 3	at Washington State	Martin Stadium • Pullman, WA
October 10	at USC	Los Angeles Memorial Coliseum • Los Angeles, CA
October 17	Oregon	California Memorial Stadium • Berkeley, CA
October 24	at Oregon State	Reser Stadium • Corvallis, OR
October 31	Washington	California Memorial Stadium • Berkeley, CA
November 7	at Arizona State	Sun Devil Stadium • Tempe, AZ
November 21	Stanford	California Memorial Stadium • Berkeley, CA (Big Game)
November 27	UCLA	California Memorial Stadium • Berkeley, CA (rivalry)

Date	Time	Opponent	Site	TV	Result	Attendance
~~November 7~~	~~7:30 p.m.~~	~~Washington~~	~~California Memorial Stadium~~; ~~Berkeley, CA~~	~~ESPN~~	No Contest	
November 15	9:00 a.m.	at UCLA	Rose Bowl; Pasadena, CA (rivalry)	FS1	L 10–34	—
November 21	12:30 p.m.	at Oregon State	Reser Stadium; Corvallis, OR	FS1	L 27–31	—
November 27	1:30 p.m.	Stanford	California Memorial Stadium; Berkeley, CA (Big Game)	FOX	L 23–24	—
December 5	4:00 p.m.	No. 23 Oregon	California Memorial Stadium; Berkeley, CA	ESPN	W 21–17	—
~~December 12~~	~~1:00 p.m.~~	at ~~Washington State~~	~~Martin Stadium~~; ~~Pullman, WA~~	~~FS1~~	No Contest	
~~December 19~~		~~Arizona~~	~~California Memorial Stadium~~; ~~Berkeley, CA~~		No Contest	
Rankings from AP Poll released prior to the game; All times are in Pacific time

== Game summaries ==
=== At UCLA ===
California Golden Bears vs. UCLA Bruins – Game summary

Quarter	1	2	3	4	Total
Golden Bears	3	7	0	0	10
Bruins	7	20	0	7	34

at Rose Bowl • Pasadena, California

- Date: November 15, 2020
- Game time: 9:00 a.m.
- Game weather: Clear, sunny, 65 °F (18 °C)
- Game attendance: 0
- Referee: Steven Strimling
- TV announcers (FS1): Aaron Goldsmith (play-by-play) and Brady Quinn (analyst)
- Reference

Game information

First quarter

- CAL – Dario Longhetto 31-yard field goal, 11:12. California 3–0. Drive: 6 plays, 3 yards, 2:38.
- UCLA – Dorian Thompson-Robinson 2-yard run (Nicholas Barr-Mira kick), 0:58. UCLA 7–3. Drive: 15 plays, 88 yards, 6:20.

Second quarter

- UCLA – Charles Njoku 27-yard pass from Dorian Thompson-Robinson (Nicholas Barr-Mira kick), 11:45. UCLA 14–3. Drive: 9 plays, 71 yards, 3:04.
- CAL – Chase Garbers 8-yard run (Dario Longhetto kick), 7:10. UCLA 14–10. Drive: 12 plays, 75 yards, 4:35.
- UCLA – Chase Cota 6-yard pass from Dorian Thompson-Robinson (kick failed), 5:49. UCLA 20–10. Drive: 5 plays, 67 yards, 1:14.
- UCLA – Kyle Philips 5-yard pass from Dorian Thompson-Robinson (Nicholas Barr-Mira kick), 1:17. UCLA 27–10. Drive: 3 plays, 13 yards, 1:22.

Third quarter

- No scoring plays.

Fourth quarter

- UCLA – Brittain Brown 31-yard run (Nicholas Barr-Mira kick), 10:12. UCLA 34–10. Drive: 8 plays, 78 yards, 4:15.

Top passers

- CAL – Chase Garbers – 18/33, 122 yards, int
- UCLA – Dorian Thompson-Robinson – 14/26, 196 yards, 3 TD, int

Top rushers

- CAL – Christopher Brown – 8 rushes, 25 yards
- UCLA – Demetric Felton – 25 rushes, 107 yards

Top receivers

- CAL – Collin Moore – 2 receptions, 28 yards
- UCLA – Greg Dulcich – 3 receptions, 80 yards

=== At Oregon State ===
California Golden Bears vs. Oregon State Beavers – Game summary

Quarter	1	2	3	4	Total
Golden Bears	7	13	0	7	27
Beavers	14	0	3	14	31

at Reser Stadium • Corvallis, Oregon

- Date: November 21, 2020
- Game time: 12:30 p.m.
- Game weather: Partly cloudy, 41 °F (5 °C)
- Game attendance: 0
- Referee: Chris Coyle
- TV announcers (FS1): Eric Collins (play-by-play) and Ben Leber (analyst)
- Reference

Game information

First quarter

- OSU – Jermar Jefferson 75-yard run (Everett Hayes kick), 14:42. Oregon State 7–0. Drive: 1 play, 75 yards, 0:18.
- CAL – Makai Polk 7-yard pass from Chase Garbers (Dario Longhetto kick), 10:30. Tied 7–7. Drive: 8 plays, 75 yards, 4:12.
- OSU – Teagan Quitoriano 35-yard pass from Tristan Gebbia (Everett Hayes kick), 5:47. Oregon State 14–7. Drive: 1 play, 35 yards, 0:09.

Second quarter

- CAL – Dario Longhetto 26-yard field goal, 14:49. Oregon State 14–10. Drive: 12 plays, 66 yards, 5:58.
- CAL – Kekoa Crawford 21-yard pass from Chase Garbers (Dario Longhetto kick), 2:31. California 17–14. Drive: 4 plays, 64 yards, 2:05.
- CAL – Dario Longhetto 52-yard field goal, 0:00. California 20–14. Drive: 11 plays, 30 yards, 1:24.

Third quarter

- OSU – Everett Hayes 35-yard field goal, 6:20. California 20–17. Drive: 13 plays, 53 yards, 5:45.

Fourth quarter

- OSU – Tristan Gebbia 8-yard pass from Tyjon Lindsey (Everett Hayes kick), 13:35. Oregon State 24–20. Drive: 6 plays, 39 yards, 2:57.
- CAL – Jake Tonges 2-yard pass from Chase Garbers (Dario Longhetto kick), 8:04. California 27–24. Drive: 6 plays, 32 yards, 2:21.
- OSU – Tristan Gebbia 1-yard run (Everett Hayes kick), 4:30. Oregon State 31–27. Drive: 3 plays, 14 yards, 0:56.

Top passers

- CAL – Chase Garbers – 28/42, 315 yards, 3 TD, 2 int
- OSU – Tristan Gebbia – 12/20, 147 yards, TD, 2 int

Top rushers

- CAL – Marcel Dancy – 17 rushes, 76 yards
- OSU – Jermar Jefferson – 18 rushes, 196 yards, TD

Top receivers

- CAL – Kekoa Crawford – 10 receptions, 141 yards, TD
- OSU – Teagan Quitoriano – 4 receptions, 65 yards, TD

=== Stanford ===
Stanford Cardinal vs. California Golden Bears – Game summary

Quarter	1	2	3	4	Total
Cardinal	0	10	14	0	24
Golden Bears	7	3	7	6	23

at California Memorial Stadium • Berkeley, California

- Date: November 27, 2020
- Game time: 1:30 p.m.
- Game weather: Clear, 64 °F (18 °C)
- Game attendance: 0
- Referee: Matt Richards
- TV announcers (FOX): Alex Faust and Petros Papadakis
- Reference

Game information

First quarter

- CAL – Kekoa Crawford 7-yard pass from Chase Garbers (Dario Longhetto kick), 10:32. California 7–0. Drive: 8 plays, 75 yards, 4:28.

Second quarter

- STAN – Jet Toner 27-yard field goal, 14:55. California 7–3. Drive: 8 plays, 48 yards, 4:29.
- CAL – Dario Longhetto 24-yard field goal, 10:15. California 10–3. Drive: 9 plays, 68 yards, 4:40.
- STAN – Michael Wilson 11-yard pass from Davis Mills (Jet Toner kick), 3:09. Tied 10–10. Drive: 3 plays, 16 yards, 0:57.

Third quarter

- STAN – Austin Jones 2-yard run (Jet Toner kick), 10:57. Stanford 17–10. Drive: 3 plays, 41 yards, 1:00.
- CAL – Nikko Remigio 3-yard pass from Chase Garbers (Dario Longhetto kick), 9:13. Tied 17–17. Drive: 6 plays, 75 yards, 1:44.
- STAN – Austin Jones 8-yard run (Jet Toner kick), 1:51. Stanford 24–17. Drive: 8 plays, 71 yards, 4:28.

Fourth quarter

- CAL – Christopher Brown 3-yard run (kick blocked), 0:58. Stanford 24–23. Drive: 14 plays, 90 yards, 3:30.

Top passers

- STAN – Davis Mills – 24/32, 205 yards, TD
- CAL – Chase Garbers – 19/29, 151 yards, 2 TD

Top rushers

- STAN – Austin Jones – 21 rushes, 85 yards, 2 TD
- CAL – Damien Moore – 10 rushes, 121 yards

Top receivers

- STAN – Michael Wilson – 7 receptions, 88 yards, TD
- CAL – Kekoa Crawford – 5 receptions, 52 yards, TD

=== Oregon ===
Oregon Ducks vs. California Golden Bears – Game summary

Quarter	1	2	3	4	Total
No. 23 Ducks	3	14	0	0	17
Golden Bears	7	7	7	0	21

at California Memorial Stadium • Berkeley, California

- Date: December 5, 2020
- Game time: 4:05 p.m.
- Game weather: Partly cloudy, 60 °F (16 °C)
- Game attendance: 0
- Referee: Francisco Villar
- TV announcers (ESPN): Dave Flemming, Rod Gilmore, Taylor McGregor
- Reference

Game information

First quarter

- ORE – Henry Katleman 21-yard field goal, 8:06. Oregon 3–0. Drive: 10 plays, 75 yards, 3:19.
- CAL – Chase Garbers 1-yard run (Dario Longhetto kick), 2:23. California 7–3. Drive: 13 plays, 75 yards, 5:43.

Second quarter

- CAL – Bradrick Shaw 1-yard run (Dario Longhetto kick), 5:31. California 14–3. Drive: 19 plays, 80 yards, 9:51.
- ORE – Johnny Johnson III 39-yard pass from Tyler Shough (Henry Katleman kick), 2:08. California 14–10. Drive: 7 plays, 75 yards, 3:23.
- ORE – Cyrus Habibi-Likio 1-yard run (Henry Katleman kick), 0:23. Oregon 17–14. Drive: 3 plays, 75 yards, 0:23.

Third quarter

- CAL – Nikko Remigio 28-yard pass from Chase Garbers (Dario Longhetto kick), 5:14. California 21–17. Drive: 5 plays, 64 yards, 2:21.

Fourth quarter

- No scoring plays.

Top passers

- ORE – Tyler Shough – 14/26, 231 yards, TD
- CAL – Chase Garbers – 20/32, 183 yards, TD

Top rushers

- ORE – Travis Dye – 12 rushes, 71 yards
- CAL – Marcel Dancy – 5 rushes, 34 yards

Top receivers

- ORE – Travis Dye – 2 receptions, 85 yards
- CAL – Nikko Remigio – 6 receptions, 81 yards, TD

== Players drafted into the NFL ==
Round	Pick	Player	Position	NFL club
4	125	Camryn Bynum	CB	Minnesota Vikings
