= Brant Kuithe =

American football tight end (born 1999)

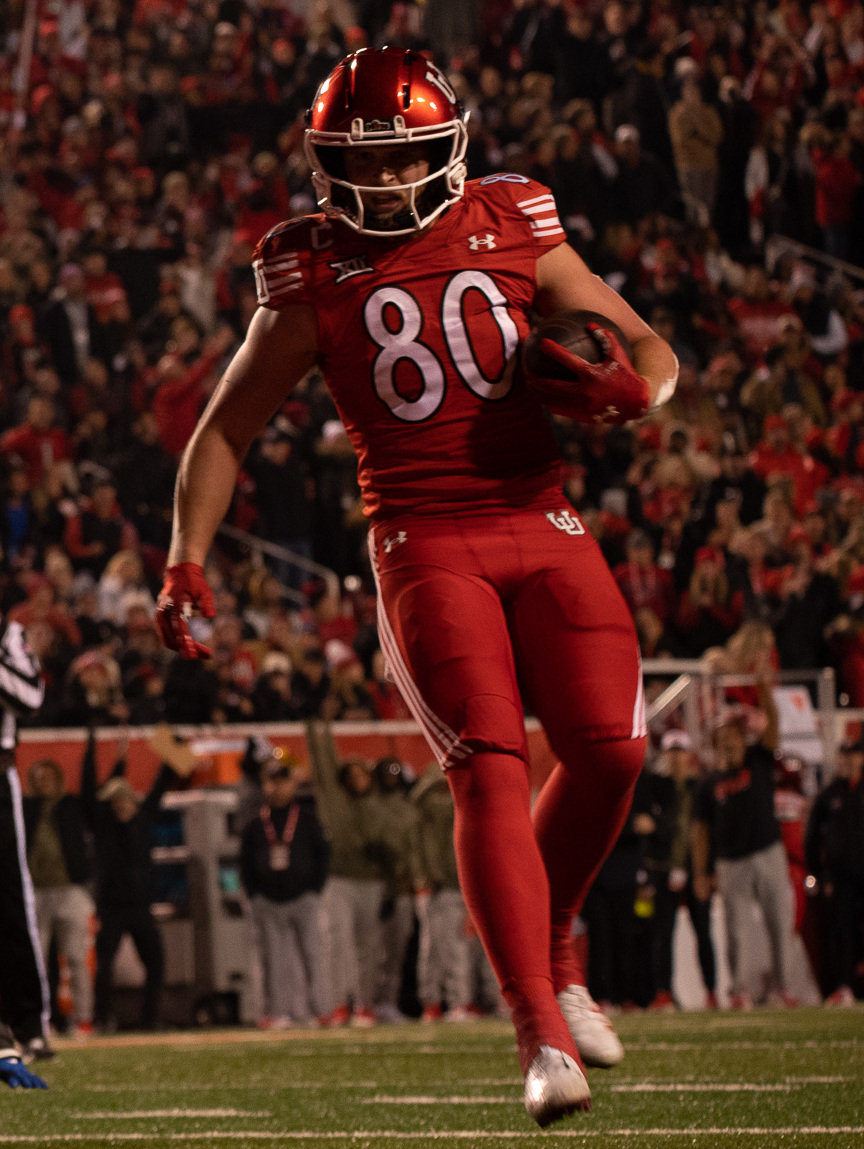
- Kuithe in 2024

No. 80
- Position: Tight end

Personal information
- Born: December 19, 1999 (age 26); Katy, Texas, U.S.
- Listed height: 6 ft 2 in (1.88 m)
- Listed weight: 236 lb (107 kg)

Career information
- High school: Cinco Ranch (Cinco Ranch, Texas)
- College: Utah (2018–2024)

Awards and highlights
- First-team All-Big 12 (2024); 3× Second team All-Pac-12 (2019, 2020, 2021)
- Stats at ESPN

Brant Kuithe (born December 19, 1999) is an American former college football player who was a tight end for the Utah Utes of the Big 12 Conference.

== Early life ==
Kuithe grew up in Katy, Texas, and attended Cinco Ranch High School, where he played football and ran track. He was named the District 19-6A MVP after rushing for 1,041 yards and 18 touchdowns and punting 22 times for 881 yards despite playing in seven games only due to injury. Kuithe and his twin brother Blake, who played edge rusher, both initially committed to play college football at Rice University, but de-committed after the firing of head coach David Bailiff. The brothers later signed to play at the University of Utah over offers from Colorado and Iowa State.

== College career ==
In his freshman season Kuithe led Utah's tight ends with 20 receptions and 227 receiving yards with a touchdown reception. Kuithe led the Utes with 34 receptions, 602 receiving yards and 6 receiving touchdowns and also rushed six times for 102 yards and three touchdowns and was named second team All-Pac-12 Conference as a sophomore. As a junior, Kuithe led the Utes with 25 receptions for 236 yards in five games during the Pac-12's abbreviated season due to Covid-19 and was again named second team All-Conference.

Two days after injuring his knee during the September 24, 2022 game against Arizona State, it was revealed that he would miss the remainder of the 2022 season due to a torn ACL.

=== College statistics ===
Year	Team	Games		Receiving				Rushing			
Year	Team	GP	GS	Rec	Yards	Avg	TD	Att	Yards	Avg	TD
2018	Utah	14	2	20	227	11.4	1	1	-2	-2.0	0
2019	Utah	14	9	34	602	17.7	6	6	102	17.0	3
2020	Utah	5	3	25	236	9.4	0	6	50	8.3	0
2021	Utah	14	9	50	611	12.2	6	4	12	3.0	1
2022	Utah	4	3	19	206	10.8	3	0	0	0.0	0
2023	Utah	Medical (redshirt)									
2024	Utah	9	5	35	505	14.6	6	8	26	3.3	2
Career		60	32	183	2,387	13.0	22	25	188	7.5	6

== Professional career ==
Pre-draft measurables
Height	Weight	Arm length	Hand span	Wingspan
6 ft 2 in (1.88 m)	236 lb (107 kg)	31 5/8 in (0.80 m)	10 1/2 in (0.27 m)	6 ft 4 3/4 in (1.95 m)
All values from NFL Combine
