= Jayden de Laura =

American football player (born 2001)

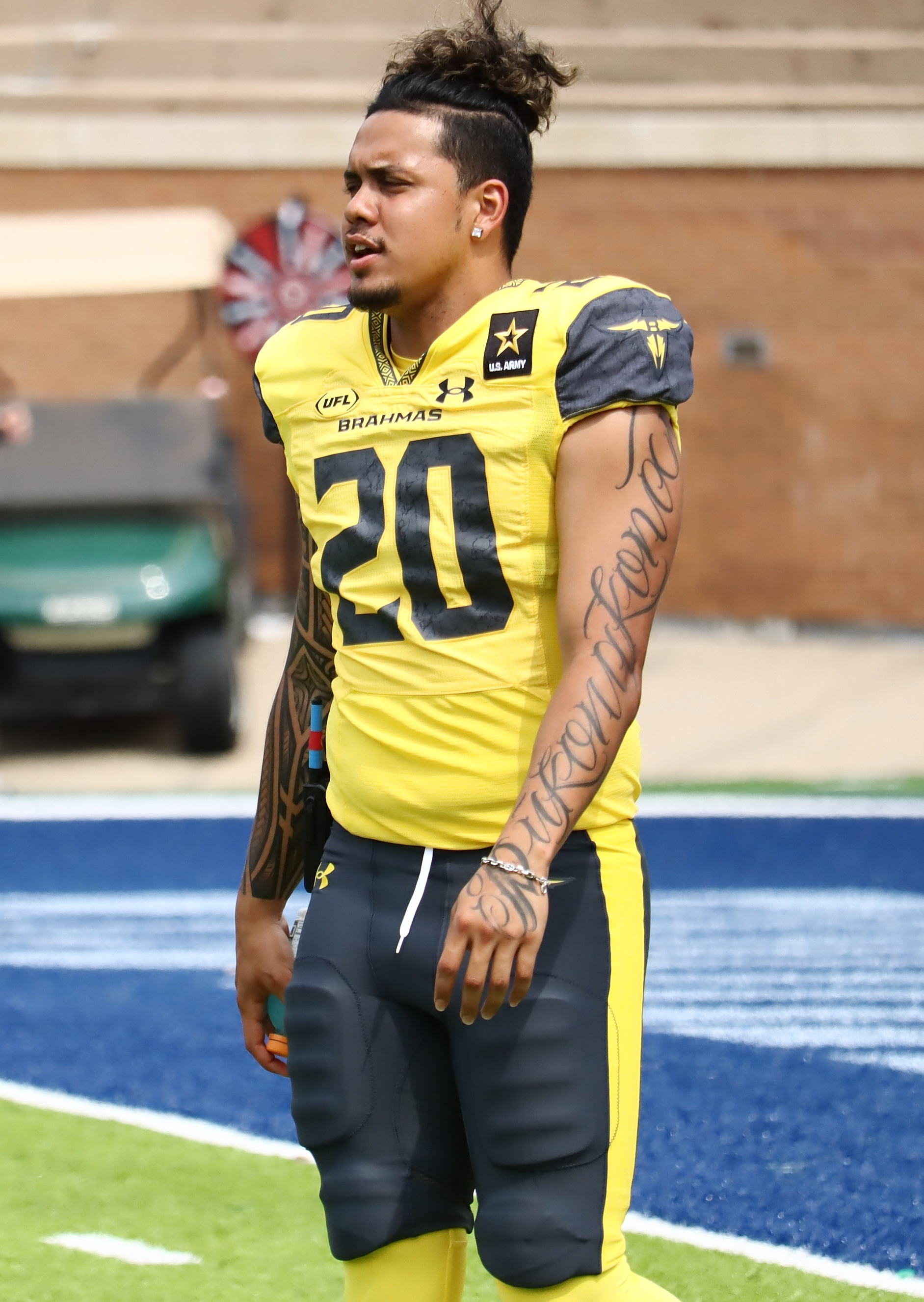
- de Laura with the San Antonio Brahmas in 2024

No. 10 – Vegas Knight Hawks
- Position: Quarterback
- Roster status: Active

Personal information
- Born: August 11, 2001 (age 25); Honolulu, Hawaii, U.S.
- Listed height: 6 ft 0 in (1.83 m)
- Listed weight: 210 lb (95 kg)

Career information
- High school: Saint Louis (Honolulu)
- College: Washington State (2020–2021); Arizona (2022–2023)
- NFL draft: 2024: undrafted

Career history
- San Antonio Brahmas (2024); Vegas Knight Hawks (2025–present)

Awards and highlights
- IFL champion (2025); IFL championship MVP (2025); Pac-12 Offensive Freshman of the Year (2021)

Jayden de Laura (born August 11, 2001) is an American football quarterback for the Vegas Knight Hawks of the Indoor Football League (IFL). He played college football for the Washington State Cougars before transferring to the Arizona Wildcats in 2022.

== Early life ==
De Laura began his high school football career at Damien Memorial School in Honolulu, Hawaii, playing on the school's junior varsity team as a quarterback, safety, kicker, and punter before dislocating his collarbone two games into the season. He then decided to focus exclusively on playing quarterback, transferring to Saint Louis School in Honolulu, which produced quarterbacks such as Timmy Chang, Marcus Mariota, Tua Tagovailoa, and Chevan Cordeiro. De Laura also worked to increase his weight from 140 pounds with help from his family, including his uncle Mel, a former strength & conditioning coach at Hawaii and SMU under June Jones.

After sitting out his sophomore year due to transfer rules, de Laura took over the starting job from Cordeiro in his junior season, during which he helped lead the team to a state title while throwing for over 2,000 passing yards. In his senior season, he threw for 3,452 yards and 29 touchdowns and was named the ILH offensive player of the year and Hawaii's Gatorade Player of the Year award.

A three-star recruit by 247Sports and ESPN, de Laura committed to playing college football at Washington State on October 2, 2019.

College recruiting
Name	Hometown	School	Height	Weight	Commit date
Jayden de Laura; QB	Honolulu, HI	Saint Louis School	6 ft 1 in (1.85 m)	190 lb (86 kg)	Oct 2, 2019
Jayden de Laura; QB	Recruit ratings: Rivals: 247Sports: ESPN: (73)				
Overall recruit ranking:
Note: In many cases, Scout, Rivals, 247Sports, On3, and ESPN may conflict in their listings of height and weight.; In these cases, the average was taken. ESPN grades are on a 100-point scale.; Sources: "ESPN commits". ESPN.; "2020 Team Ranking". Rivals.com.

== College career ==
=== Washington State ===
Initially unsure about his future at Washington State following the departure of Mike Leach and other offers from schools such as Ohio State, de Laura reaffirmed his commitment to Washington State following the hire of Hawaii head coach Nick Rolovich, whose run and shoot offense was similar to the one de Laura ran at Saint Louis.

De Laura was named the starting quarterback for the opening game against Oregon State in 2020, becoming the first true freshman quarterback to start a season opener in program history. He missed one game against Stanford after testing positive for COVID-19.

=== Arizona ===
After the end of the 2021 Washington State season on January 7, 2022, de Laura entered his name into the transfer portal. On January 10, De Laura announced his intention to transfer to the University of Arizona.

On December 25, 2023, Arizona head coach Jedd Fisch announced that de Laura would be entering the transfer portal for the second time.

=== Texas State ===
In January 2024, de Laura transferred to Texas State. On January 24, de Laura withdrew his transfer to Texas State days after settling his civil sexual assault case and public outcry.

On February 22, de Laura declared for the 2024 NFL draft.

=== Statistics ===
Year	Team	Games			Passing								Rushing			
Year	Team	GP	GS	Record	Cmp	Att	Pct	Yds	Avg	TD	Int	Rtg	Att	Yds	Avg	TD
2020	Washington State	4	4	1–3	78	129	60.5	886	6.9	5	4	124.7	28	34	1.2	2
2021	Washington State	12	11	7–4	227	359	63.2	2,798	7.9	23	9	144.8	46	67	1.5	3
2022	Arizona	12	12	5–7	272	435	62.5	3,685	8.5	25	13	146.7	74	116	1.6	4
2023	Arizona	7	4	3–1	89	126	69.5	1,120	8.8	10	5	161.0	21	121	5.8	3
Career		35	31	16−15	666	1,051	63.4	8,489	8.1	63	31	145.1	169	338	2.0	12

== Professional career ==
Pre-draft measurables
Height	Weight	Arm length	Hand span	40-yard dash	10-yard split	20-yard split	20-yard shuttle	Three-cone drill	Vertical jump	Broad jump
5 ft 10 1/2 in (1.79 m)	207 lb (94 kg)	30 3/8 in (0.77 m)	9 3/8 in (0.24 m)	4.93 s	1.76 s	2.82 s	4.64 s	7.55 s	27.5 in (0.70 m)	8 ft 9 in (2.67 m)
All values from Pro Day

=== San Antonio Brahmas ===
After not being selected in the 2024 NFL draft, de Laura signed with the San Antonio Brahmas of the United Football League (UFL) on May 2, 2024. He was released by the Brahmas on May 20.

=== Vegas Knight Hawks ===
On March 27, 2025, de Laura signed with the Vegas Knight Hawks of the Indoor Football League. In 12 appearances for the Knight Hawks during the 2025 season, he threw for 1,222 yards, 26 touchdowns, and two interceptions, leading the team to a 10–6 regular season record. On August 23, de Laura led the Knight Hawks to the league championship in a 64–61 victory over the Green Bay Blizzard.

== Sexual assault settlement ==
On May 3, 2023, Hawaii News Now reported that de Laura settled a civil lawsuit stemming from a criminal sexual assault case that was handled in juvenile court. It was reported that De Laura "agreed to pay a woman who said she was raped by the players on October 27, 2018, after the St. Louis Crusaders beat Punahou in the ILH championship game." The woman's complaint alleged that de Laura held and choked the woman "to gain her cooperation" while forcing her to engage in sexual acts against her will. According to the complaint, de Laura texted the woman admitting to the assault. It was also reported that de Laura pleaded guilty to second degree sexual assault. On August 31, 2023, however, a Hawaiian judge struck down the settlement agreement. On January 18, 2024, it was reported that de Laura again agreed to settle the lawsuit. The settlement was reached around the time of his transfer to Texas State
