= Ty Jordan =

American football player (2001–2020)

No. 22
- Position: Running back

Personal information
- Born: November 21, 2001; Mesquite, Texas, U.S.
- Died: December 25, 2020 (aged 19); Denton, Texas, U.S.
- Listed height: 5 ft 7 in (1.70 m)
- Listed weight: 200 lb (91 kg)

Career information
- High school: West Mesquite (Mesquite, Texas)
- College: Utah (2020)

Awards and highlights
- Second-team All-Pac-12 (2020); Pac-12 Offensive Freshman of the Year (2020); Freshman All-American (2020); Utah Utes No. 22 retired

Ty-Coreous Jordan (November 21, 2001 – December 25, 2020) was an American college football player who was a running back for the Utah Utes in the Pac-12 Conference. He earned second-team all-conference honors and was named the Pac-12 Offensive Freshman of the Year in 2020.

== Early life ==
As a junior at West Mesquite High School in Mesquite, Texas, Jordan rushed for 1,236 yards and 16 touchdowns. In his senior year in 2019, he ran for 453 yards on 77 carries and had 41 receptions for 378 yards and scored a combined 11 touchdowns (7 rushing, 4 receiving). Jordan was also on the school's track and field team, running a personal-best 10.52 in the 100-meter dash as a junior.

Jordan initially committed verbally to play college ball for the Texas Longhorns, but he decommitted and signed with the Utah Utes instead.

== College career ==
Amid the COVID-19 pandemic during the 2020 season at the University of Utah, Jordan made his college debut on his 19th birthday on November 21, 2020, when he had 53 all-purpose yards on eight touches in a 33–17 loss to USC. In his third game, he rushed 27 times for 167 yards for the first 100-yard rushing game by a Utah true freshman since Chris Fuamatu-Maʻafala in 1995. He later became the first Utes freshman since Fuamatu-Maʻafala to accumulate three straight 100-yard rushing games. Jordan finished the season with 597 rushing yards and six touchdowns in five games. His 144.6 all-purpose yards per game average ranked second among freshmen in the Football Bowl Subdivision.

The Pac-12 named Jordan to their All-Pac-12 second team and voted him the Pac-12 Offensive Freshman of the Year. He was the first Utah player to garner conference freshman of the year recognition since Jason Kaufusi in 2000, when the Utes were in the Mountain West Conference. Jordan was also named to the Freshman All-America team by The Athletic and the True Freshman All-American team by 247Sports. The Associated Press selected him as the Pac-12 Newcomer of the Year.

== Personal life and death ==
In December 2018, Jordan's mother, Tiffany, was diagnosed with stage 4 lung cancer. She received a bone cancer diagnosis the following month in January. In November 2019, a picture went viral of Jordan kneeling with a friend on the opposing team in prayer for Jordan's mother. She died in August 2020.

On December 25, 2020, four months after his mother's death, Jordan died in Denton, Texas, after being shot in the abdomen from an apparent self-inflicted accidental gunshot. He was 19 years old. His death on Christmas Day was just the day after he was named the conference newcomer of the year.

Jordan's memorial service was held on January 6, 2021, at AT&T Stadium in Arlington, Texas. The University of Utah chartered a plane, and his service was attended by members of the athletic department and most of the football team and coaching staff. It was just the second memorial service ever held at AT&T Stadium—the first was the tribute to U.S. military sniper Chris Kyle in 2013.

== Legacy ==
After his death, the Ty Jordan Memorial Scholarship was founded, and it was awarded to Aaron Lowe, with whom Jordan played in both high school and at Utah. Lowe changed his jersey number to No. 22 in Jordan’s honor. Lowe was shot and killed on September 26, 2021, which was nine months and one day after Jordan’s death. No. 22 was retired on October 30, 2021, in Jordan’s and Lowe’s memories. On December 3, 2021, at the Pac-12 Conference Championship, there was a “moment of loudness” in their memories.

== See also ==
- List of American football players who died during their careers
