= Britain Covey =

American football player (born 1997)

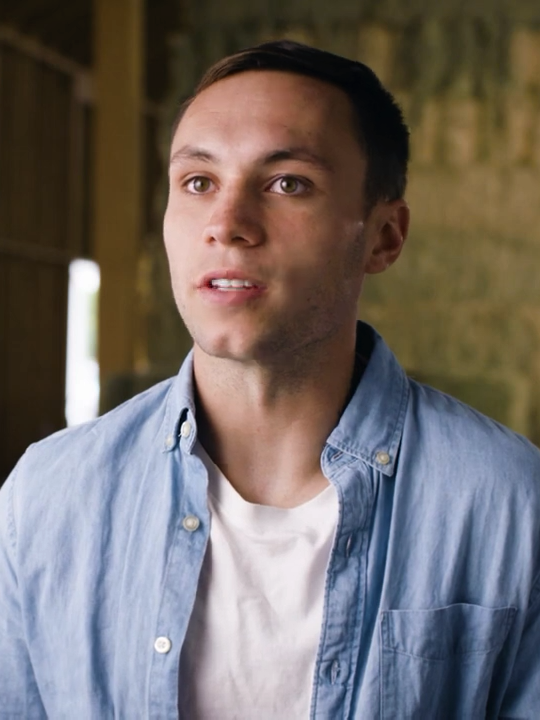
- Covey in 2021

No. 85 – Philadelphia Eagles
- Position: Wide receiver
- Roster status: Active

Personal information
- Born: March 18, 1997 (age 29); Provo, Utah, U.S.
- Listed height: 5 ft 8 in (1.73 m)
- Listed weight: 173 lb (78 kg)

Career information
- High school: Timpview (UT)
- College: Utah (2015, 2018–2021)
- NFL draft: 2022: undrafted

Career history
- Philadelphia Eagles (2022–2024); Los Angeles Rams (2025)*; Philadelphia Eagles (2025–present)
- * Offseason or practice squad member only

Awards and highlights
- Super Bowl champion (LIX); NFL punt return yards leader (2023); First-team All-American (2021); Freshman All-American (2015); 3× First-team All-Pac-12 (2018, 2020, 2021)

Career NFL statistics as of Week 7, 2026
- Receptions: 13
- Receiving yards: 96
- Return yards: 1,625
- Stats at Pro Football Reference

Britain Covey (born March 18, 1997) is an American professional football wide receiver for the Philadelphia Eagles of the National Football League (NFL). He played college football for the Utah Utes and was signed by the Philadelphia Eagles as an undrafted free agent in 2022.

== Early life ==
Covey grew up in Provo, Utah, and attended Timpview High School. He is the grandson of author Stephen Covey. Covey earned the Eagle Scout rank in 2015 with the Utah National Parks Council. In high school, Covey played two years at quarterback and led his team to a 26–0 record. He totaled 4492 passing yards and threw for 56 touchdowns, while also making 2904 rushing yards and scoring 44 touchdowns as a runner. He finished his high school career fourth all-time in Utah touchdowns (with 111), despite only playing two years as a starter. He was twice the Utah Valley Football Player of the Year and led Timpview to back-to-back state championships. Covey made nearly 7,400 yards of total offense at the school.

== College career ==
Covey committed to the University of Utah, and as a true freshman started eight games and appeared in twelve. He led Utah with 43 catches for 519 yards with four touchdown catches, and was the conference leader in receiving yards per game, total receiving yards, catches per game, touchdown catches and overall receptions, being named honorable mention All-Pac-12. He also played on special teams, leading the team with 916 all-purpose yards and being named first-team Freshman All-American by Sporting News and Scout.com for his work as a punt returner. Covey was named a freshman All-America receiver by Pro Football Focus.

Covey missed the 2016 and 2017 seasons as he was on a LDS mission in Chile. He returned to Utah in 2018. That year, he started four games and appeared in a total of thirteen, being named a first-team all-conference returner after posting 221 punt return and 144 kick return yards. He also led Utah in receptions with 60, receiving yards with 637 and yards per game with 49.0. He finished the year with one touchdown and 1,174 all-purpose yards, and also was 3-for-3 passing with 71 yards and two scores. A torn ACL in the Pac-12 Championship Game forced him to miss the bowl games.

In 2019, Covey redshirted after playing in four games (three as a starter). He recorded ten catches for 77 yards, three rush attempts for 22 yards, nine punt returns for 69 yards and three kickoff returns for 52 yards. He was a Pac-12 All-Academic Honor Roll selection.

In a COVID-19-shortened 2020 season, Covey appeared in four games and started two. He made 19 receptions for a team-leading 264 yards and scored a team-high three touchdowns receiving. He was second in the FBS (first in the conference) with a punt return average of 16.1 yards. Against Washington State, Covey recorded 134 receiving yards, a career-high, and made a 91-yard touchdown catch, the second longest in school history. He was a first-team All-Pac-12 return specialist and was honorable mention all-conference at receiver. Phil Steele named him an honorable mention All-American.

As a senior in 2021, Covey started six games and appeared in a total of fourteen, making 52 catches for 514 yards and a team-leading 1,400 all-purpose yards. In the Rose Bowl Game against Ohio State, Covey made a 97-yard kickoff return touchdown and recorded 208 total all-purpose yards, second all-time in a single game for Utah. His kick return score was the fourth longest in team history. He was named Paul Hornung Player of the Week for his performance against San Diego State, in which he made eight catches for 46 yards and a touchdown, in addition to six punt returns for 132 yards and a 25-yard kick return for a total of 203 all-purpose yards. The 132 punt return yards ranked second-most for an FBS player on the season and is sixth all-time in team history for a single game. Covey placed seventh in the FBS with combined return yards with 787 and was third in punt return average and first in punt return touchdowns. He averaged 100.0 yards exactly per game, and was named a CBS Sports and Phil Steele first-team All-American at the end of the year. FWWA named him a second-team selection, as Covey also made first-team All-Pac-12.

Covey finished his college career with the all-time team record in punt return yards (with 1,092), second in career punt returns (with 92), second in catches (with 184), third in all-purpose yards (with 4,241) and sixth in receiving yards (with 2,011). He led the school in receiving yards in three seasons (2015, 2018, 2020) and played in 47 total games, with 23 starts.

== Professional career ==
Pre-draft measurables
Height	Weight	Arm length	Hand span	Wingspan	40-yard dash	10-yard split	20-yard split	20-yard shuttle	Three-cone drill	Vertical jump	Broad jump
5 ft 8 in (1.73 m)	169 lb (77 kg)	27 3/8 in (0.70 m)	8 1/2 in (0.22 m)	5 ft 8 in (1.73 m)	4.50 s	1.54 s	2.60 s	4.09 s	6.73 s	32.0 in (0.81 m)	9 ft 10 in (3.00 m)
All values from Pro Day

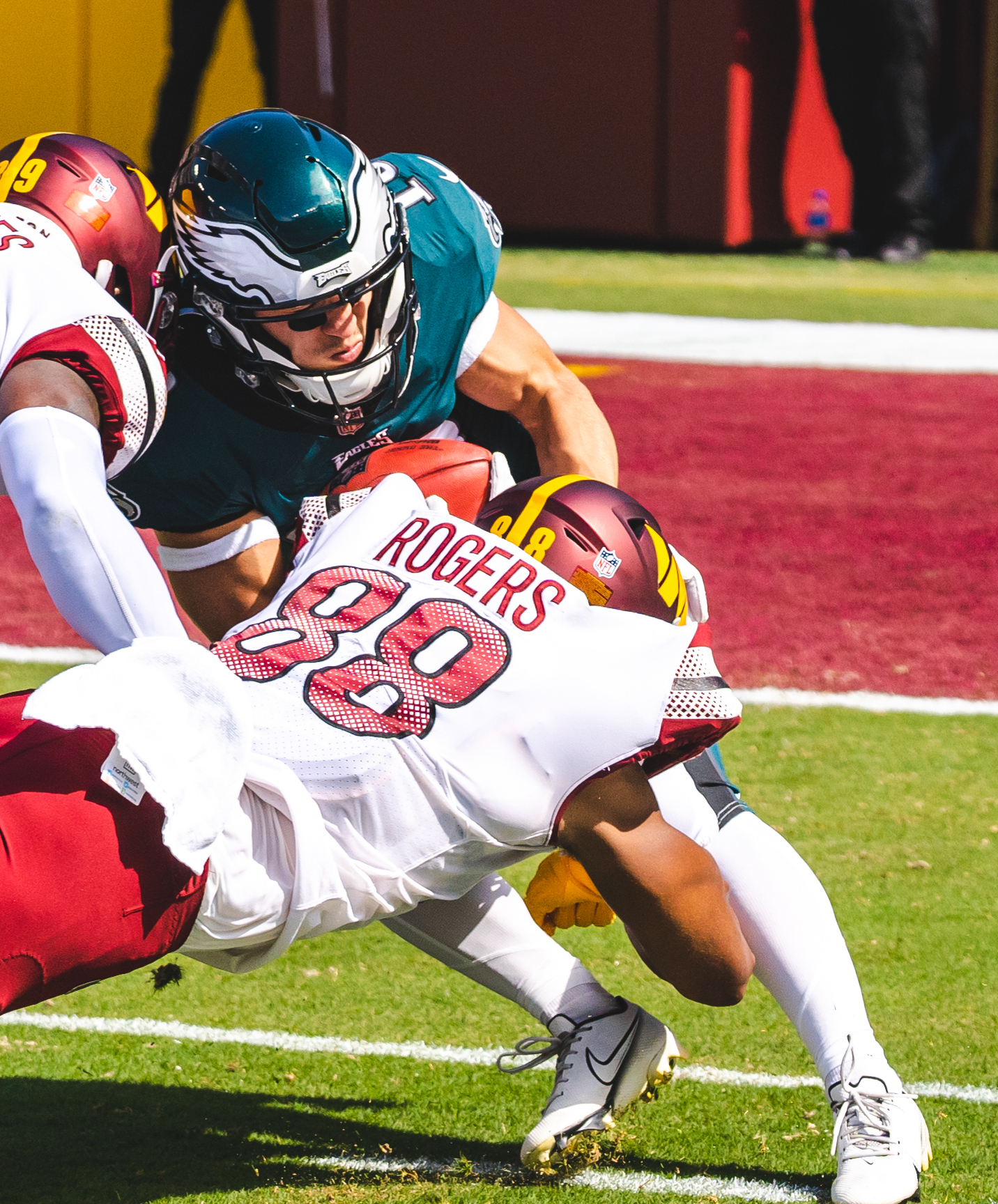
Covey with the Eagles in 2022

=== Philadelphia Eagles ===
After going unselected in the 2022 NFL draft, Covey was signed by the Philadelphia Eagles as an undrafted free agent. He was waived on August 30, 2022, and signed to the practice squad the next day. He was elevated to the active roster for their week one game against the Detroit Lions, and made his NFL debut in the match, returning two punts for 13 yards. Covey was signed to the active roster on October 1. In week thirteen against the Tennessee Titans, he returned six punts for 105 yards for an average of 17.5 yards-per-return, which was the second-highest single-game total in the season. Covey helped the Eagles reach Super Bowl LVII. In the Super Bowl, Covey had two punt returns for 35 yards in the Eagles 38–35 loss to the Kansas City Chiefs.

On August 29, 2023, Covey was waived by the Eagles and re-signed to the practice squad. He was elevated to active roster for the first two games before being permanently signed to the active roster on September 20 ahead of their week 3 matchup against the Buccaneers, where Covey had 111 return yards including a 52-yard punt return in the 25-11 win. Covey finished the season 2nd in average yards per punt return and led the league in total punt return yards with 417. He was listed an alternate to the 2024 Pro Bowl following his successful season.

Covey appeared in 5 games for Philadelphia in 2024, recording 34 yards on 7 receptions. In the return game, he averaged 7.7 yards per return and 46 total yards. On December 28, 2024, Covey was placed on injured reserve with a neck injury, ending his regular season. Covey won a Super Bowl ring when the Eagles defeated the Chiefs in Super Bowl LIX.

=== Los Angeles Rams ===
On May 5, 2025, the Los Angeles Rams signed Covey to a one-year contract. He was waived on August 26 as part of final roster cuts.

=== Philadelphia Eagles (second stint) ===
On August 28, 2025, Covey signed with the Philadelphia Eagles' practice squad. He was promoted to the active roster on November 26.

On August 30, 2026, Covey was released by the Eagles as a part of final roster cuts; he was re-signed to the practice squad the next day. On September 15, he was signed to the active roster.

== NFL career statistics ==
Legend
	Led the league
**Bold**	Career high

=== Regular season ===
Year	Team	Games		Receiving						Punt returns					Kick returns					Fumbles	
Year	Team	GP	GS	Tgt	Rec	Yds	Avg	Lng	TD	Ret	Yds	Avg	Lng	TD	Ret	Yds	Avg	Lng	TD	Fum	FR
2022	PHI	**17**	0	0	—	—	—	—	—	**33**	308	9.3	27	0	**10**	**206**	20.6	26	0	**2**	**2**
2023	PHI	16	0	6	4	**42**	**10.5**	**22**	0	29	**417**	**14.4**	**54**	0	1	30	**30.0**	**30**	0	**2**	1
2024	PHI	5	1	**8**	**7**	34	4.9	11	0	6	46	7.7	10	0	0	0	0.0	0	0	0	0
2025	PHI	6	0	4	2	20	10.0	12	0	11	124	11.3	22	0	5	125	25.0	30	0	2	2
2026	PHI	7	0	0	0	0	0.0	0	0	14	177	12.6	41	0	9	192	21.3	42	0	0	0
Career		51	1	18	13	96	7.4	22	0	93	1,072	11.5	54	0	25	553	22.1	42	0	6	5

=== Postseason ===
Year	Team	Games		Receiving						Punt returns					Kick returns					Fumbles	
Year	Team	GP	GS	Tgt	Rec	Yds	Avg	Lng	TD	Ret	Yds	Avg	Lng	TD	Ret	Yds	Avg	Lng	TD	Fum	FR
2022	PHI	**3**	0	0	—	—	—	—	—	**2**	**35**	**17.5**	**27**	0	0	—	—	—	—	0	0
2023	PHI	1	0	0	—	—	—	—	—	1	0	0.0	0	0	0	—	—	—	—	**1**	**1**
2024	PHI	0	0	0	—	—	—	—	—	0	0	0.0	0	0	0	—	—	—	—	0	0
2025	PHI	1	0	0	—	—	—	—	—	0	0	0.0	0	0	2	61	30.5	27	0	0	0
Career		5	0	0	—	—	—	—	—	3	35	11.7	27	0	2	61	30.5	27	0	1	1

== See also ==
- List of Eagle Scouts
