= Tristan Gebbia =

American football player (born 1998)

No. 14, 3, 13
- Position: Quarterback

Personal information
- Born: June 1, 1998 (age 28); Calabasas, California, U.S.
- Listed height: 6 ft 2 in (1.88 m)
- Listed weight: 210 lb (95 kg)

Career information
- High school: Calabasas
- College: Nebraska (2017); Oregon State (2018–2022); Ohio State (2023)
- Stats at ESPN

Tristan Gebbia (born June 1, 1998) is an American former football quarterback. He played college football at Nebraska, Oregon State and Ohio State.

== College career ==
Gebbia began his collegiate career at Nebraska in 2017 before transferring to Oregon State.

Gebbia was Oregon State's starting quarterback for four games in 2020 before sustaining a hamstring injury on a quarterback sneak against Oregon.

Gebbia did not play in 2021 but returned in 2022 and was voted a team captain for the third consecutive year. Limited to a backup role, he completed five of five passes in 2022. He transferred to Ohio State on January 17, 2023.
