= Jarek Broussard =

American football player (born 2000)

Profile
- Position: Running back

Personal information
- Born: April 24, 2000 (age 26); New Orleans, Louisiana
- Listed height: 5 ft 9 in (1.75 m)
- Listed weight: 195 lb (88 kg)

Career information
- High school: Richardson (TX); Bishop Lynch (TX)
- College: Colorado (2018–2021); Michigan State (2022)
- NFL draft: 2023: undrafted

Awards and highlights
- Pac-12 Offensive Player of the Year (2020); First-team All-Pac-12 (2020)
- Stats at Pro Football Reference

Jarek Broussard (born April 24, 2000) is an American football running back.

== Early life ==
Broussard grew up in Dallas, Texas and attended Bishop Lynch High School. As a senior, he rushed for 745 yards and 10 touchdowns on 63 carries while catching 22 passes for 360 yards and three touchdowns. Broussard was rated a three-star recruit and committed to play college football at Colorado over offers from Colorado State, Houston, Illinois, and TCU.

== College career ==
Broussard redshirted as a true freshman after suffering a knee injury in practice in early September and also missed the entirety of the following season. As a redshirt sophomore, Broussard rushed for 895 yards and five touchdowns on 156 attempts and was named first team All-Pac-12 Conference and the conference Offensive Player of the Year. He was named the conference Offensive Player of the Week twice, including after rushing for 301 yards against Arizona on December 5, 2020, in a 24–13 win over Arizona. Broussard rushed 142 times for 661 yards and two touchdowns as a redshirt junior. After the season, he entered the NCAA transfer portal.

Broussard ultimately transferred to Michigan State.
