= 2020 USC Trojans football team =

American college football season

2020 USC Trojans football

Pac-12 South Division champion

Pac-12 Championship Game, L 24–31 vs. Oregon
- Conference: Pac-12 Conference
- South Division

Ranking
- Coaches: No. 21
- AP: No. 21
- Record: 5–1 (5–0 Pac-12)
- Head coach: Clay Helton (5th season)
- Offensive coordinator: Graham Harrell (2nd season)
- Offensive scheme: Air raid
- Defensive coordinator: Todd Orlando (1st season)
- Base defense: 3–3–5
- Captain: 4: Kedon Slovis; Amon-Ra St. Brown; Alijah Vera-Tucker; Isaiah Pola-Mao
- Home stadium: United Airlines Field at the Los Angeles Memorial Coliseum

Uniform
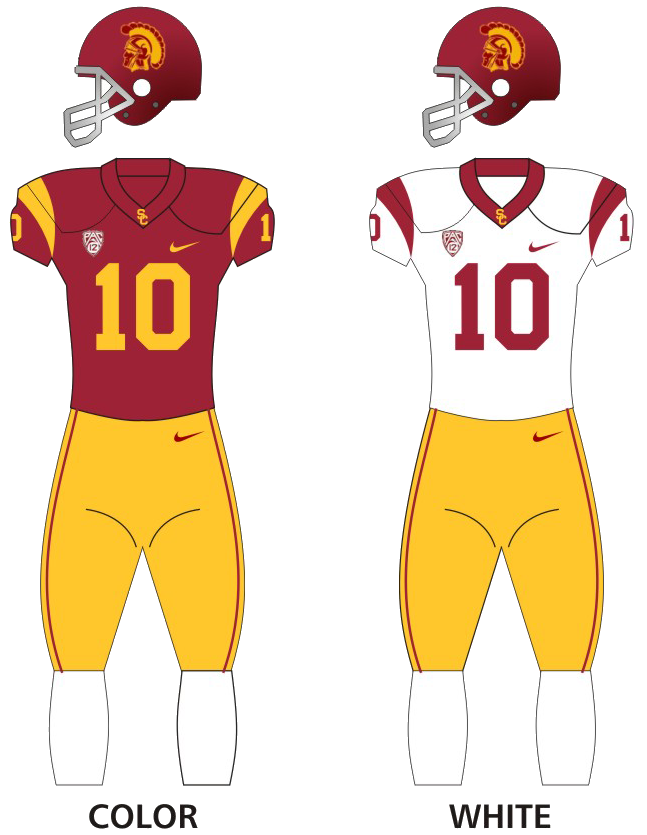

2020 Pac-12 Conference football standings
	Conf.			Overall
Team	W		L	W		L
North Division
Washington x	3	–	1	3	–	1
Oregon y$	3	–	2	4	–	3
Stanford	4	–	2	4	–	2
California	1	–	3	1	–	3
Washington State	1	–	3	1	–	3
Oregon State	2	–	5	2	–	5
South Division
No. 21 USC xy	5	–	0	5	–	1
Colorado	3	–	1	4	–	2
Utah	3	–	2	3	–	2
Arizona State	2	–	2	2	–	2
UCLA	3	–	4	3	–	4
Arizona	0	–	5	0	–	5
Championship: Oregon 31, USC 24
$ – Conference champion; x – Division champion/co-champions; y – Championship game participant; Note: Due to COVID-19, the Pac-12 suspended the season on August 11, but later decided to begin play on November 6. In addition to the title game on December 18, the conference seeded all remaining teams for a game during that weekend.; Rankings from AP Poll.

The 2020 USC Trojans football team represented the University of Southern California in the 2020 NCAA Division I FBS football season. They played their home games at the Los Angeles Memorial Coliseum and competed as members of the South Division of the Pac-12 Conference. They were led by fifth-year head coach Clay Helton.

On August 11, the Pac-12 Conference initially canceled all fall sports competitions due to the COVID-19 pandemic. On September 24, the conference announced that a six-game conference-only season would begin on November 6, with the conference's championship game to be played on December 18. Teams not selected for the championship game would be seeded to play a seventh game.

USC compiled a 5–0 regular season record, and qualified for the Pac-12 Championship Game, which they lost to Oregon. The following day, USC announced that it would not play in any bowl game, ending the season with an overall 5–1 record.

== Offseason ==
=== Transfers ===
The Trojans lost nine players to transfer.

Name	Number	Pos.	Height	Weight	Year	Hometown	Transfer to
Clayton Bradley	#76	OT	6'5	295	Senior (redshirt)	Orange, CA	UNLV Rebels
JT Daniels	#10	QB	6'3	210	Sophomore (redshirt)	Santa Ana, CA	Georgia Bulldogs
Thomas Fitts	#15	PK	6'1	185	Senior (redshirt)	Dallas, TX	SMU Mustangs
Daniel Imatorbhebhe	#88	TE	6’3	240	Senior (redshirt)	Suwanee, GA	Illinois Fighting Illini
Velus Jones Jr.	#1	WR	6'0	190	Senior (redshirt)	Saraland, AL	Tennessee Volunteers
C.J. Pollard	#28	S	6'1	195	Senior (redshirt)	Carson, CA	Utah State Aggies
Jack Sears	#13	QB	6'3	205	Sophomore (redshirt)	San Clemente, CA	Boise State Broncos
Devon Williams	#2	WR	6'4	205	Junior (redshirt)	Lancaster, CA	Oregon Ducks
Jack Yary	-	TE	6’6	255	Freshman	Murrieta, CA	Washington Huskies

The Trojans added 5 players via transfer.

Name	Number	Pos.	Height	Weight	Year	Hometown	Transfer from
Joe Bryson	–	OT	6'8	285	Junior	Castle Pines, CO	Colorado Mesa Mavericks
Micah Croom	–	DB	6'1	210	Senior (redshirt)	Miami, FL	Dartmouth Big Green
Mo Hasan	–	QB	6'3	190	Senior (redshirt)	Miami, FL	Vanderbilt Commodores
Samuel Oram-Jones	–	TB	5'8	200	Graduate	Milton Keynes, UK	Vanderbilt Commodores
Nathan Weneta	–	LS	6'2	210	Freshman	San Diego, CA	Purdue Boilermakers

=== Returning Starters ===
USC returns 37 starters in 2020 including 15 on offense, 19 on defense, and 3 on special teams.

Key departures include Michael Pittman Jr. (WR – 13 games), Austin Jackson (OT – 13 games), Drew Richmond (OT – 12 games), Christian Rector (DE – 10 games), John Houston Jr. (ILB – 13 games)

Other departures include Jack Sears (QB – 1 game in 2018), Dominic Davis (WR – 9 games), and Jacob Daniel (OG – 6 games).

==== Offense (15) ====
Player	Class	Position	Games started
Kedon Slovis	Sophomore	Quarterback	11 games
Matt Fink	Senior (redshirt)	Quarterback	1 game
Vavae Malepeai	Senior (redshirt)	Tailback	7 games
Stephen Carr	Senior	Tailback	1 game
Kenan Christon	Sophomore	Tailback	3 games
Erik Krommenhoek	Senior	Tight end	5 games
Josh Falo	Senior	Tight end	2 games
Amon-Ra St. Brown	Junior	Wide receiver	12 games
Tyler Vaughns	Senior (redshirt)	Wide receiver	11 games
Drake London	Sophomore	Wide receiver	9 games
Alijah Vera-Tucker	Junior (redshirt)	Offensive guard	13 games
Jalen McKenzie	Junior (redshirt)	Offensive guard	13 games
Liam Jimmons	Senior (redshirt)	Offensive guard	2 games
Brett Neilon	Junior (redshirt)	Center	11 games
Justin Dedich	Sophomore (redshirt)	Center	2 games

==== Defense (19) ====
Player	Class	Position	Games started
Jay Tufele	Junior (redshirt)	Defensive tackle	13 games
Marlon Tuipulotu	Junior (redshirt)	Defensive tackle	12 games
Drake Jackson	Sophomore	Defensive end	11 games
Caleb Tremblay	Senior (redshirt)	Defensive end	2 games
Connor Murphy	Senior (redshirt)	Defensive end	1 game
Brandon Pili	Senior	Defensive tackle	1 game
Palaie Gaoteote IV	Junior	Inside linebacker	7 games
Kana'i Mauga	Junior	Inside linebacker	8 games
Hunter Echols	Junior (redshirt)	Outside linebacker	2 games
Eli'jah Winston	Sophomore (redshirt)	Outside linebacker	1 game
Olaijah Griffin	Junior	Cornerback	10 games
Isaac Taylor-Stuart	Sophomore (redshirt)	Cornerback	8 games
Greg Johnson	Junior (redshirt)	Cornerback	9 games
Chris Steele	Sophomore	Cornerback	6 games
Max Williams	Freshman (redshirt)	Cornerback	2 games
Chase Williams	Sophomore (redshirt)	Defensive back	4 games
Dorian Hewett	Sophomore	Defensive back	1 game
Talanoa Hufanga	Junior	Safety	10 games
Isaiah Pola-Mao	Junior (redshirt)	Safety	12 games

==== Special teams (3) ====
Player	Class	Position	Games started
Chase McGrath	Junior (redshirt)	Kicker	13 games
Damon Johnson	Senior (redshirt)	Long snapper	13 games
Ben Griffiths	Sophomore (redshirt)	Punter	13 games

=== Recruiting class ===
College recruiting (2020)
Name	Hometown	School	Height	Weight	Commit date
Gary Bryant Jr. #7 WR	Corona, California	Centennial High School	5 ft 11 in (1.80 m)	164 lb (74 kg)	December 18, 2019 (Signed) / January 4, 2020 (Committed)
Gary Bryant Jr. #7 WR	Recruit ratings: 247Sports: ESPN:				
Jonah Monheim #16 OG	Moorpark, California	Moorpark High School	6 ft 5 in (1.96 m)	280 lb (130 kg)	December 18, 2019 (Signed) / August 24, 2019 (Committed)
Jonah Monheim #16 OG	Recruit ratings: 247Sports: ESPN:				
Tuli Tuipulotu #40 DT	Lawndale, California	Lawndale High School	6 ft 3 in (1.91 m)	266 lb (121 kg)	December 18, 2019 (Signed) / December 18, 2019 (Committed)
Tuli Tuipulotu #40 DT	Recruit ratings: 247Sports: ESPN:				
Josh Jackson Jr. #74 WR	Harbor City, California	Narbonne High School	6 ft 1 in (1.85 m)	179 lb (81 kg)	December 18, 2019 (Signed) / March 23, 2019 (Committed)
Josh Jackson Jr. #74 WR	Recruit ratings: 247Sports: ESPN:				
Jamar Sekona #47 DT	Kentfield, California	Marin Catholic High School	6 ft 3 in (1.91 m)	303 lb (137 kg)	December 18, 2019 (Signed) / July 30, 2019 (Committed)
Jamar Sekona #47 DT	Recruit ratings: 247Sports: ESPN:				
Kobe Pepe #49 DT	Bellflower, California	St. John Bosco High School	6 ft 1 in (1.85 m)	294 lb (133 kg)	December 18, 2019 (Signed) / June 21, 2019 (Committed)
Kobe Pepe #49 DT	Recruit ratings: 247Sports: ESPN:				
Courtland Ford #52 OT	Cedar Hill, Texas	Cedar Hill High School	6 ft 6 in (1.98 m)	305 lb (138 kg)	December 18, 2019 (Signed) / December 9, 2019 (Committed)
Courtland Ford #52 OT	Recruit ratings: 247Sports: ESPN:				
Caadyn Stephen #54 OT	Camas, Washington	Camas High School	6 ft 5 in (1.96 m)	295 lb (134 kg)	December 18, 2019 (Signed) / September 4, 2019 (Committed)
Caadyn Stephen #54 OT	Recruit ratings: 247Sports: ESPN:				
Casey Collier #88 OT	Mont Belvieu, Texas	Barbers Hill High School	6 ft 7 in (2.01 m)	300 lb (140 kg)	December 18, 2019 (Signed) / December 2, 2019 (Committed)
Casey Collier #88 OT	Recruit ratings: 247Sports: ESPN:				
Andrew Milek #99 OT	Phoenix, Arizona	Brophy College Preparatory	6 ft 6 in (1.98 m)	295 lb (134 kg)	December 18, 2019 (Signed) / June 21, 2019 (Committed)
Andrew Milek #99 OT	Recruit ratings: 247Sports: ESPN:				
Andres Dewerk #100 OT	Los Gatos, California	Los Gatos High School	6 ft 7 in (2.01 m)	297 lb (135 kg)	December 18, 2019 (Signed) / June 23, 2019 (Committed)
Andres Dewerk #100 OT	Recruit ratings: 247Sports: ESPN:				
Parker Lewis #7 K	Scottsdale, Arizona	Saguaro High School	6 ft 3 in (1.91 m)	200 lb (91 kg)	December 18, 2019 (Signed) / August 5, 2018 (Committed)
Parker Lewis #7 K	Recruit ratings: 247Sports: ESPN:				
Danny Lockhart II #137 ILB	Redlands, California	St. John Bosco High School	5 ft 11 in (1.80 m)	210 lb (95 kg)	January 27, 2020 (Committed/Walk on)
Danny Lockhart II #137 ILB	Recruit ratings: 247Sports:				
Matthew Colombo; TB	Bellflower, California	St. John Bosco High School	5 ft 11 in (1.80 m)	185 lb (84 kg)	February 4, 2020 (Committed/Walk on)
Matthew Colombo; TB	Recruit ratings: 247Sports:				
Danny Ryan; WR	San Francisco, California	St. Ignatius College Prep	6 ft 2 in (1.88 m)	180 lb (82 kg)	March 2, 2020 (Committed/Walk on)
Danny Ryan; WR	Recruit ratings: 247Sports:				
Tommy Maurice; S	Brookfield, Wisconsin	Brookfield Central High School	5 ft 9 in (1.75 m)	190 lb (86 kg)	May 1, 2020 (Committed/Walk on)
Tommy Maurice; S	Recruit ratings: 247Sports:				
Overall recruit ranking: Scout: – 247Sports: #51 ESPN: –
Note: In many cases, Scout, Rivals, 247Sports, On3, and ESPN may conflict in their listings of height and weight.; In these cases, the average was taken. ESPN grades are on a 100-point scale.; Sources: "2020 Team Ranking". Rivals.com.

=== 2020 NFL draft ===
==== NFL Combine ====
The official list of participants for the 2020 NFL Combine included USC football players Michael Pittman (WR) and Austin Jackson (OT).

==== Team players drafted into the NFL ====
Player	Position	Round	Pick	NFL team
Austin Jackson	Offensive tackle	1	18	Miami Dolphins
Michael Pittman Jr.	Wide receiver	2	34	Indianapolis Colts
Christian Rector	Defensive end	UDFA	–	–
John Houston Jr.	Inside linebacker	UDFA	–	Pittsburgh Steelers
Drew Richmond	Offensive tackle	UDFA	–	–

== Preseason ==
=== Pac-12 media days ===
==== Pac-12 media polls ====
In the 2020 Pac-12 preseason media poll.

== Personnel ==
=== Coaching staff ===
Name	Position	Seasons at USC	Alma mater	Before USC
Clay Helton	Head coach	10	Houston (1994)	Memphis – Offensive coordinator (2009)
Graham Harrell	Offensive coordinator / quarterbacks coach	2	Texas Tech (2009)	North Texas – Offensive coordinator / quarterbacks coach (2018)
Todd Orlando	Defensive coordinator / linebackers coach	1	Wisconsin (1993)	Texas – Defensive coordinator / linebackers coach (2019)
Sean Snyder	Special teams coordinator	1	Kansas State (1993)	Kansas State – Assistant head coach / special teams coordinator / senior special teams analyst (2019)
Mike Jinks	Tailbacks coach	2	Angelo State (1993)	Bowling Green – Head coach (2018)
Keary Colbert	Wide receivers coach	6	USC (2006)	Alabama – Offensive analyst (2015)
John David Baker	Inside wide receivers / tight ends coach	2	Abilene Christian (2013)	North Texas – Offensive quality control coach (2018)
Tim Drevno	Offensive line coach / running game coordinator / pass protection coordinator	4	Cal State Fullerton (1992)	Michigan – Offensive coordinator / offensive line coach (2015)
Vic So'oto	Defensive line coach	1	BYU (2011)	Virginia – Defensive line coach (2019)
Donte Williams	Cornerbacks coach / Defensive Pass game coordinator	1	Idaho State (2006)	Oregon – Cornerbacks coach (2019)
Craig Naivar	Safeties coach	1	Hardin-Simmons (1993)	Texas – Co-Defensive coordinator / Safeties coach (2019)
Aaron Ausmus	Head strength and conditioning coach	4	Tennessee (1998)	Tennessee – Director of strength and conditioning (2009)

=== Roster ===
2020 USC Trojans Football roster
Quarterback: 9 Kedon Slovis – Sophomore (6'3, 215); 10 Mo Hasan – (redshirt) Senior (6'3, 205); 13 Isaac Ward – Freshman (6'0, 175); 19 Matt Fink – (redshirt) Senior (6'3, 210); 38 Brad Aoki – (redshirt) Sophomore (5'9, 170); Tailback: 7 Stephen Carr – Senior (6'0, 215); 23 Kenan Christon – Sophomore (5'10, 185); 26 Samuel Oram-Jones – (redshirt) Senior (5'8, 200); 27 Quincy Jountti – (redshirt) Senior (5'10, 215); 29 Vavae Malepeai – (redshirt) Senior (6'0, 200); 30 Markese Stepp – (redshirt) Sophomore (6'0, 235); 34 Matthew Colombo – Freshman (5'11, 185); 37 Ben Easington – (redshirt) Junior (5'10, 215); 46 Grant Jones – (redshirt) Senior (6'2, 225); Wide receiver: 1 Gary Bryant Jr. – Freshman (5'11, 170); 4 Bru McCoy – (redshirt) Freshman (6'3, 220); 6 Joshua Jackson Jr. – Freshman (6'1, 185); 8 Amon-Ra St. Brown – Junior (6'1, 195); 15 Drake London – Sophomore (6'5, 210); 17 Zach Wilson – (redshirt) Sophomore (6'1, 205); 21 Tyler Vaughns – (redshirt) Senior (6'2, 190); 22 Jack Webster – (redshirt) Junior (6'0, 190); 40 Ty Shamblin – Freshman (6'0, 185); 42 Danny Ryan – Freshman (6'2, 175); 80 John Jackson III – Sophomore (6'2, 205); 81 Kyle Ford – (redshirt) Freshman (6'2, 210); 86 Chase Locke – (redshirt) Freshman (6'4, 200); Tight end: 18 Jude Wolfe – (redshirt) Freshman (6'5, 250); 46 Scott Voigt – (redshirt) Senior (6'3, 215); 83 Josh Falo – Senior (6'6, 235); 84 Erik Krommenhoek – Senior (6'5, 260); 85 Ethan Rae – (redshirt) Freshman (6'5, 245); 89 Sean Mahoney – (redshirt) Freshman (6'5, 230); Placekicker: 38 Alex Stadthaus – Junior (6'2, 205); 40 Chase McGrath – (redshirt) Junior (6'0, 190); 48 Parker Lewis – Freshman (6'3, 205); 49 Michael Brown – (redshirt) Senior (6'1, 205)	Offensive Lineman: 51 Bernard Schirmer – OT – (redshirt) Senior (6'6, 285); 56 Andres Dewerk – OT – Freshman (6'7, 295); 57 Justin Dedich – C-OG – (redshirt) Sophomore (6'2, 300); 61 Joe Bryson – OT – Junior (6'8, 295); 62 Brett Neilon – C – (redshirt) Junior (6'2, 305); 63 Damian Lopez – OG-OT – (redshirt) Junior (6'6, 315); 64 AJ Mageo – OG-OT – (redshirt) Sophomore (6'5, 310); 65 Frank Martin II – OG – (redshirt) Senior (6'4, 310); 66 Gino Quinones – C-OG – (redshirt) Freshman (6'3, 290); 67 Mark Zuvich – C – (redshirt) Sophomore (6'3, 250); 68 Liam Douglass – OG-OT – (redshirt) Sophomore (6'5, 315); 69 Casey Collier – OT – Freshman (6'7, 290); 70 Jalen McKenzie – OT – (redshirt) Junior (6'5, 315); 71 Liam Jimmons – OG-OT – (redshirt) Senior (6'4, 315); 72 Andrew Vorhees – OG – (redshirt) Junior (6'6, 320); 73 Caadyn Stephen – OT – Freshman (6'5, 285); 74 Courtland Ford – OT – Freshman (6'5, 305); 75 Alijah Vera-Tucker – OG – (redshirt) Junior (6'4, 315); 77 Jason Rodriguez – OT – (redshirt) Freshman (6'6, 320); 78 Andrew Milek – C-OT – Freshman (6'5, 290); 79 Jonah Monheim – OG – Freshman (6'5, 290); Defensive line: 45 Maninoa Tufono – (redshirt) Freshman (6'3, 245); 47 Stanley Ta'ufo'ou – (redshirt) Freshman (6'3, 280); 49 Tuli Tuipulotu – Freshman (6'3, 265); 50 Nick Figueroa – (redshirt) Junior (6'5, 260); 77 Jamar Sekona – Freshman (6'2, 300); 79 De'jon Benton – (redshirt) Freshman (6'3, 300); 90 Connor Murphy – (redshirt) Senior (6'7, 270); 91 Brandon Pili – Senior (6'4, 325); 93 Marlon Tuipulotu – (redshirt) Junior (6'3, 305); 94 Kobe Pepe – Freshman (6'1, 300); 95 Trevor Trout – (redshirt) Sophomore (6'4, 310); 96 Caleb Tremblay – (redshirt) Senior (6'5, 270); 97 Jacob Lichtenstein – (redshirt) Junior (6'5, 265); Outside Linebacker: 31 Hunter Echols – (redshirt) Junior (6'5, 245); 41 Juliano Falaniko – (redshirt) Junior (6'4, 235); 48 Peter Esparza – (redshirt) Sophomore (6'1, 215); 53 Bryce Matthews – (redshirt) Junior (6'3, 225); 99 Drake Jackson – Sophomore (6'4, 255)	Inside Linebacker: 1 Palaie Gaoteote IV – Junior (6'2, 250); 10 Ralen Goforth – Sophomore (6'2, 235); 18 Raymond Scott – (redshirt) Sophomore (6'2, 220); 26 Kana'i Mauga – Junior (6'2, 245); 34 Eli'jah Winston – (redshirt) Sophomore (6'3, 240); 36 Clyde Moore – (redshirt) Freshman (6'0, 225); 44 Tuasivi Nomura – (redshirt) Freshman (6'1, 225); 52 Spencer Gilbert – (redshirt) Sophomore (6'0, 220); 54 Tayler Katoa – (redshirt) Sophomore (6'2, 230); 56 Jordan Iosefa – (redshirt) Senior (6'2, 235); 57 Danny Lockhart II – Freshman (6'0, 220); 58 Solomon Tuliaupupu – (redshirt) Sophomore (6'3, 240); Cornerback: 2 Olaijah Griffin – Junior (6'0, 175); 6 Isaac Taylor-Stuart – (redshirt) Sophomore (6'2, 195); 8 Chris Steele – Sophomore (6'1, 190); 13 Adonis Otey – (redshirt) Freshman (6'1, 185); 14 Jayden Williams – Sophomore (6'1, 195); 22 Dorian Hewett – Sophomore (6'0, 185); 44 Jack Drake – (redshirt) Junior (5'10, 190); Safety: 4 Max Williams – (redshirt) Freshman (5'9, 180); 7 Chase Williams – (redshirt) Sophomore (6'2, 195); 9 Greg Johnson – (redshirt) Junior (5'11, 195); 15 Talanoa Hufanga – Junior (6'1, 215); 17 Micah Croom – (redshirt) Senior (6'1, 210); 21 Isaiah Pola-Mao – (redshirt) Junior (6'4, 205); 23 Kaulana Makaula – (redshirt) Freshman (6'3, 210); 25 Briton Allen – Sophomore (6'0, 185); 30 Jordan McMillan – (redshirt) Sophomore (5'11, 195); 37 Tommy Maurice – Freshman (5'9, 190); Punter: 24 Ben Griffiths – (redshirt) Sophomore (6'5, 245); 35 Michael McAllister – Freshman (6'2, 230); 36 Will Rose – (redshirt) Freshman (6'1, 180); 47 Michael Shahidi – (redshirt) Freshman (6'0, 180); Long snappers: 39 Jac Casasante – (redshirt) Sophomore (6'0, 215); 53 Nathan Weneta – (redshirt) Freshman (6'2, 215); 59 Damon Johnson – (redshirt) Senior (6'0, 210)
2020 USC Football Roster (10/21/2020)

=== Depth chart ===
Defense

FS
Isaiah Pola-Mao
Chase Williams

Nickelback	ILB	ILB	B-Backer
Greg Johnson	Palaie Gaoteote IV	Ralen Goforth	Drake Jackson
Max Williams	Raymond Scott	Kana'i Mauga	Hunter Echols

SS
Talanoa Hufanga
Micah Croom

CB
Olaijah Griffin
Dorian Hewett
Jayden Williams

DE	NT	DE
Nick Figueroa	Marlon Tuipulotu	Caleb Tremblay
Tuli Tuipulotu	Brandon Pili	Connor Murphy

CB
Chris Steele
Isaac Taylor-Stuart

Offense

WR
Tyler Vaughns
Bru McCoy

WR
Drake London
John Jackson III

LT	LG	C	RG	RT
Alijah Vera-Tucker	Andrew Vorhees	Brett Neilon	Liam Jimmons	Jalen McKenzie
Casey Collier	Liam Douglass	Justin Dedich	Courtland Ford	Jonah Monheim

TE
Erik Krommenhoek
Jude Wolfe

WR
Amon-Ra St. Brown
Joshua Jackson, Jr.
Gary Bryant Jr.

QB
Kedon Slovis
Matt Fink

Key reserves
Offense
Quincy Jountti TB
Andres Dewerk OL
AJ Mageo OL
Gino Quinones OL
Caadyn Stephen OL
Jason Rodriguez OL
Andrew Milek OL
Josh Falo TE
Ethan Rae TE
Defense
Adonis Otey DB
Kaulana Makaula DB
Briton Allen DB
Juliano Falaniko LB
Tuasivi Nomura LB
Maninoa Tufono DL
Stanley Tau'ufo'ou DL
Tayler Katoa LB
Jamar Sekona DL
De'jon Benton DL
Jacob Lichtenstein DL
Special teams
Chase McGrath K
Michael Brown K
Alex Stadthaus K (KOS)
Will Rose P
Jac Casasante LS
Questionable
-
Out (season)
Samuel Oram-Jones TB
Eli'jah Winston LB
Jordan Iosefa LB
Solomon Tuliaupupu LB
Kyle Ford WR
Trevor Trout DL
Out (Opt Out)
Bernard Schirmer OT
Frank Martin II OL
Out (Transfer Portal)
Munir McClain WR
Abdul-Malik McClain OLB

RB
Stephen Carr
Vavae Malepeai
Kenan Christon
Markese Stepp

Special teams
PK Parker Lewis
P Ben Griffiths
KR Amon-Ra St. Brown
Stephen Carr
PR Amon-Ra St. Brown
Tyler Vaughns
LS Damon Johnson
H Ben Griffiths

- Official Depth Chart as of 11/6/2020

True Freshman
Double Position : *

=== Scholarship distribution chart ===
Position	Freshman (25)	Sophomore (22)	Junior (15)	Senior (16)	2021 signed (20) 2021 targets (10)	2022 commit (3)
QB 2 (3)	–	Kedon Slovis	–	Matt Fink	Jaxson Dart; Miller Moss	Devin Brown
TB 5 (1)	–	Kenan Christon; Markese Stepp	–	Stephen Carr; Quincy Jountti*; Vavae Malepeai	Brandon Campbell	–
WR 9 (2)	Gary Bryant Jr. Kyle Ford; Joshua Jackson Jr. Bru McCoy	John Jackson III; Drake London; Munir McClain	Amon-Ra St. Brown	Tyler Vaughns	Michael Jackson III; Joseph Manjack IV; Kyron Ware-Hudson	–
TE 4 (2)	Ethan Rae; Jude Wolfe	–	–	Josh Falo; Erik Krommenhoek	Lake McRee; Michael Trigg	–
OL 17 (4)	Casey Collier; Andres Dewerk; Courtland Ford; Andrew Milek; Jonah Monheim; Gino Quinones; Jason Rodriguez; Caadyn Stephen	Justin Dedich; Liam Douglass	Jalen McKenzie; Brett Neilon; Alijah Vera-Tucker; Andrew Vorhees	Liam Jimmons; Frank Martin II; Bernard Schirmer	Ty Buchanan; Maximus Gibbs; Mason Murphy	Dylan Lopez
DL 13 (2)	De'jon Benton; Kobe Pepe; Jamar Sekona; Stanley Ta'ufo'ou; Maninoa Tufono; Tuli Tuipulotu	Trevor Trout	Nick Figueroa; Jacob Lichtenstein; Marlon Tuipulotu	Connor Murphy; Brandon Pili; Caleb Tremblay	Colin Mobley; Ishmael Sopsher (Transfer); Jay Toia	–
OLB 4 (1)	–	Drake Jackson; Eli'Jah Winston	Hunter Echols; Juliano Falaniko	–	Julien Simon	–
ILB 7 (1)	Ralen Goforth	Tayler Katoa; Tuasivi Nomura; Raymond Scott; Solomon Tuliaupupu	Kana'i Mauga	Jordan Iosefa	–	Niuafe Tuihalamaka
CB 6 (1)	Adonis Otey	Dorian Hewett; Chris Steele; Isaac Taylor-Stuart; Jayden Williams	Olaijah Griffin	–	Prophet Brown	–
S 7 (1)	Kaulana Makaula; Max Williams	Briton Allen; Chase Williams	Talanoa Hufanga; Greg Johnson; Isaiah Pola-Mao	–	Xamarion Gordon	–
SP 4	Parker Lewis	Ben Griffiths	–	Michael Brown; Damon Johnson	–	–
ATH (3)	x	x	x	x	Anthony Beavers Jr. Calen Bullock; Jaylin Smith	–

redshirt year used / redshirt year eligible / * Former Walk-on

– 85 scholarships permitted, 82 currently allotted to players

– 81 recruited players on scholarship (on former walk-ons)

– Transfer portal out : Palaie Gaoteote IV (ILB, -), Abdul-Malik McClain (OLB, Jackson State), Chase McGrath (K, -)

– COVID-19 Opt out to NFL : Jay Tufele (DL)

Scholarship Distribution 2020

== Schedule ==
=== Regular season ===
USC had games scheduled against Alabama, New Mexico, and Notre Dame, but canceled these games on July 10 because the Pac-12 Conference decided to play a conference-only schedule because of the COVID-19 pandemic.

Original 2020 USC Trojans schedule
Date	Opponent	Site
September 5	vs. Alabama*	AT&T Stadium • Arlington, TX (Advocare Classic)
September 12	New Mexico*	Los Angeles Memorial Coliseum • Los Angeles, CA
September 19	at Stanford	Stanford Stadium • Stanford, CA (rivalry)
September 26	Arizona State	Los Angeles Memorial Coliseum • Los Angeles, CA
October 2	at Utah	Rice–Eccles Stadium • Salt Lake City, UT
October 10	California	Los Angeles Memorial Coliseum • Los Angeles, CA
October 17	at Arizona	Arizona Stadium • Tucson, AZ
October 31	Colorado	Los Angeles Memorial Coliseum • Los Angeles, CA
November 7	at Oregon	Autzen Stadium • Eugene, OR
November 14	Washington	Los Angeles Memorial Coliseum • Los Angeles, CA
November 21	at UCLA	Rose Bowl • Pasadena, CA (Victory Bell)
November 28	Notre Dame*	Los Angeles Memorial Coliseum • Los Angeles, CA (Jeweled Shillelagh)

Date	Time	Opponent	Rank	Site	TV	Result	Attendance
November 7	9:00 a.m.	Arizona State^{†}	No. 20	Los Angeles Memorial Coliseum; Los Angeles, CA (Big Noon Kickoff)	Fox	W 28–27	—
November 14	12:30 p.m.	at Arizona	No. 20	Arizona Stadium; Tucson, AZ	Fox	W 34–30	—
November 21	7:30 p.m.	at Utah	No. 20	Rice-Eccles Stadium; Salt Lake City, UT	ESPN	W 33–17	—
~~November 28~~	~~12:30 p.m.~~	~~Colorado~~	No. 18	~~Los Angeles Memorial Coliseum~~; ~~Los Angeles, CA~~	~~ABC~~	No Contest	—
December 6	4:30 p.m.	Washington State	No. 20	Los Angeles Memorial Coliseum; Los Angeles, CA	FS1	W 38–13	—
December 12	4:30 p.m.	at UCLA	No. 15	Rose Bowl; Pasadena, CA (Victory Bell)	ABC	W 43–38	—
December 18	5:00 p.m.	Oregon	No. 13	Los Angeles Memorial Coliseum; Los Angeles, CA (Pac-12 Championship Game)	Fox	L 24–31	—
^{†}Homecoming; Rankings from AP Poll released prior to the game; All times are in Pacific time

== Game summaries ==
=== Arizona State ===
Arizona State Sun Devils at USC Trojans

Quarter	1	2	3	4	Total
Sun Devils	3	14	7	3	27
No. 20 Trojans	7	7	0	14	28

at Los Angeles Memorial Coliseum, Los Angeles, California

- Date: November 7, 2020
- Game time: 9:07 a.m. PT
- Game weather: 57 °F (14 °C) Partly Sunny
- Game attendance: 0
- Referee: Chris Coyte
- TV announcers (Fox): Gus Johnson, Joel Klatt, Jenny Taft

Game information

First Quarter

- Arizona State (12:11) – #45 Cristian Zendejas 38 yard field goal – Arizona State 3–0
- USC (3:30) – #7 Stephen Carr 2 yard run TD
  (#48 Parker Lewis kick) – USC 7–3

Second Quarter

- Arizona State (10:39) – #1 DeaMonte Trayanum 25 yard run TD
  (#45 Cristian Zendejas kicks) – Arizona State 10–7
- USC (6:10) – #30 Markese Stepp 1 yard run TD
  (#48 Parker Lewis kicks) – USC 14–10
- Arizona State (4:48) – #5 Jayden Daniels to #3 Rachaad White 55 yard pass TD
  (#45 Cristian Zendejas kicks) – Arizona State 17–14

Third Quarter

- Arizona State (6:47) – #1 DeaMonte Trayanum 17 yard run TD
  (#45 Cristian Zendejas kicks) – Arizona State 24–14

Fourth Quarter

- Arizona State (11:23) – #45 Cristian Zendejas 38 yard field goal – Arizona State 27–14
- USC (2:52) – #9 Kedon Slovis to #4 Bru McCoy 26 yard pass TD
  (#48 Parker Lewis kicks) – Arizona State 27–21
- USC (1:20) – #9 Kedon Slovis to #15 Drake London 21 yard pass TD
  (#48 Parker Lewis kicks) – USC 28–27

Passing

- Arizona state – #5 Jayden Daniels – 11/23 134 yds 1TD
- USC – #9 Kedon Slovis – 40/55 381 yds 2TD 1Int

Rushing

- Arizona state – #1 DeaMonte Trayanum – 12 Runs 84 yds 2TD
- USC – #30 Markese Stepp – 14 Runs 53 yds 1TD

Receiving

- Arizona state – #3 Rachaad White – 3 Rec 70 yds 1TD
- USC – #15 Drake London – 8 Rec 125 yds 1TD

=== Arizona ===
USC Trojans at Arizona Wildcats

Quarter	1	2	3	4	Total
No. 20 Trojans	10	7	3	14	34
Wildcats	7	6	7	10	30

at Arizona Stadium, Tucson, Arizona

- Date: November 14, 2020
- Game time: 12:35 p.m. PST
- Game weather: 72 °F (22 °C) Clear, Sunny
- Game attendance: 0
- Referee: Matt Richards
- TV announcers (Fox): Gus Johnson, Joel Klatt, Jenny Taft and Dean Blandino

Game information

1st Quarter

- USC (10:36) – #30 Markese Stepp 1 yard run TD
  (#48 Parker Lewis kick) – USC 7–0
- Arizona (8:50) – #17 Grant Gunnell to #10 Jamarye Joiner 34 yard pass TD
  (#43 Lucas Havrisik kick) – Tied 7–7
- USC (2:04) – #48 Parker Lewis 30 yard field goal – USC 10–7

2nd Quarter

- Arizona (5:07) – #43 Lucas Havrisik 24 yard field goal – Tied 10–10
- USC (2:33) – #7 Stephen Carr 3 yard run TD
  (#48 Parker Lewis kick) – USC 17–10
- Arizona (0:12) – #43 Lucas Havrisik 32 yard field goal – USC 17–13

3rd Quarter

- USC (9:57) – #48 Parker Lewis 28 yard field goal – USC 20–13
- Arizona (9:45) – #17 Grant Gunnell to #11 Tayvian Cunningham 75 yard pass TD
  (#43 Lucas Havrisik kick) – Tied 20–20

4th Quarter

- Arizona (7:49) – #43 Lucas Havrisik 51 yard field goal – Arizona 23–20
- USC (3:30) – #9 Kedon Slovis to #84 Erik Krommenkoek 6 yard pass TD
  (#48 Parker Lewis kick) – USC 27–23
- Arizona (1:35) – #17 Grant Gunnell to #86 Stanley Berryhill III 6 yard pass TD
  (#43 Lucas Havrisik kick) – Arizona 30–27
- USC (0:25) – #29 Vavae Malepeai 8 yard run TD
  (#48 Parker Lewis kick) – USC 34–30

Passing

- USC – #9 Kedon Slovis – 30/43 325 yds 1TD
- Arizona – #17 Grant Gunnell – 24/36 286 yds 3TD 1Int

Rushing

- USC – #7 Stephen Carr – 12 Runs 82 yds 1TD
- Arizona – #0 Gary Brightwell – 21 Runs 112 yds

Receiving

- USC – #8 Amon-Ra St. Brown – 7 Rec 113 yds
- Arizona – #11 Tayvian Cunningham – 5 Rec 110 yds 1TD

=== Utah ===
USC Trojans at Utah Utes

Quarter	1	2	3	4	Total
No. 20 Trojans	3	21	6	3	33
Utes	3	14	0	0	17

at Rice-Eccles Stadium, Salt Lake City, Utah

- Date: November 21, 2020
- Game time: 7:30 p.m. PST
- Game weather: 34 °F (1 °C) Mostly Clear, Humidity at 58%
- Game attendance: 0
- TV announcers (ESPN): Dave Flemming, Rod Gilmore, Stormy Buonantony

Game information

1st Quarter

- Utah (9:07) – #97 Jadon Redding kicks a 36 yard field goal – Utah 3–0
- USC (5:17) – #48 Parker Lewis kicks a 35 yard field goal – Tied 3–3

2nd Quarter

- USC (14:04) – #29 Vavae Malepeai runs for a 2 yard TD (#48 Parker Lewis kick) – USC 10–3
- Utah (11:53) – #29 Nephi Sewell recovered a fumble for a 23 yard TD (#97 Jadon Redding kick) – Tied 10–10
- USC (9:28) – #9 Kedon Slovis to #21 Isaiah Pola-Mao for a 8 yard pass TD (#48 Parker Lewis kick) – USC 17–10
- USC (5:45) – #9 Kedon Slovis to #84 Erik Krommenhoek for a 10 yard pass TD (#48 Parker Lewis kick) – USC 24–10
- Utah (0:49) – #8 Jake Bentley to #45 Samson Nacua for a 7 yard pass TD (#97 Jadon Redding kick) – USC 24–17

3rd Quarter

- USC (9:32) – #48 Parker Lewis kicks a 44 yard field goal – USC 27–17
- USC (4:47) – #48 Parker Lewis kicks a 43 yard field goal – USC 30–17

4th Quarter

- USC (1:03) – #48 Parker Lewis kicks a 47 yard field goal – USC 33–17

Passing

- USC – #9 Kedon Slovis 17/28 217 yds 2 touchdowns 1 interception
- Utah – #7 Cameron Rising 3/6 45 yds, 0 touchdowns, 1 Interception
  #8 Jake Bentley 4/8 41 yds 1 touchdown 0 interception

Rushing

- USC – #29 Vavae Malepeai 13 Att, 55 yds, 1 touchdown
- Utah – #8 Jake Bentley 2 Att, 33 yds, 0 touchdown

Receiving

- USC – #21 Tyler Vaughns 4 Rec, 62 yds, 1 touchdown
- Utah – #21 Ty Jordan 1 Rec, 21 yds, 0 touchdown

=== Washington State ===
Washington State Cougars at USC Trojans

Quarter	1	2	3	4	Total
Cougars	0	6	0	7	13
No. 20 Trojans	28	7	3	0	38

at Los Angeles Memorial Coliseum, Los Angeles, California

- Date: December 6, 2020
- Game time: 4:30 p.m. PST
- Game attendance: 0
- Referee: S. Strimling
- TV announcers (FS1): Alex Faust and Petros Papadakis

Game information

First Quarter

- USC (8:46) – #9 Kedon Slovis to #8 Amon-Ra St. Brown for a 7 yard pass TD (#48 Parker Lewis kick) – USC 7–0 Drive 7 Plays, 65 yards, 2:50
- USC (5:11) – #9 Kedon Slovis to #8 Amon-Ra St. Brown for a 22 yard pass TD (#48 Parker Lewis kick) – USC 14–0 Drive 5 Plays, 34 yards, 2:20
- USC (2:33) – #9 Kedon Slovis to #8 Amon-Ra St. Brown for a 4 yard pass TD (#48 Parker Lewis kick) – USC 21–0 Drive 1 Plays, 4 yards, 0:06
- USC (0:44) – #9 Kedon Slovis to #8 Amon-Ra St. Brown for a 2 yard pass TD (#48 Parker Lewis kick) – USC 28–0 Drive 4 Plays, 31 yards, 1:40

Second Quarter

- USC (7:11) – #9 Kedon Slovis to #21 Tyler Vaughns for a 33 yard pass TD (#2 Parker Lewis kick) – USC 35–0 Drive 7 Plays, 80 yards, 3:51
- WSU (0:28) – #1 Travell Harris runs for a 5 yard TD (#40 Blake Mazza kick missed) – USC 35–6 Drive 11 Plays, 75 yards, 6:43

Third Quarter

- USC (11:53) – #48 Parker Lewis kicks a 48 yard field goal – USC 38–6 Drive 8 Plays, 16 yards, 3:07

Fourth Quarter

- WSU (1:37) – #15 Gunner Cruz to #9 Renard Bell for a 6 yard pass TD (#40 Blake Mazza kick) – USC 38–13 Drive 16 Plays, 93 yards, 10:38

Passing leaders

- Washington state – #4 Jayden de Laura 18/29 134 yds 2 interceptions
- USC – #9 Kedon Slovis 25/32 287 yds 5 touchdowns

Rushing

- Washington state – #3 Deon McIntosh 10 rushes 65 yds
- USC – #23 Kenan Christon 3 rushes 11 yds

Receiving

- Washington state – #9 Renard Bell 11 receptions 76 yds 1 touchdown
- USC – #15 Drake London 5 receptions 92 yds

=== UCLA ===
USC Trojans at UCLA Bruins

Quarter	1	2	3	4	Total
Trojans	0	10	13	20	43
Bruins	7	14	14	3	38

at Rose Bowl, Pasadena, California

- Date: December 12, 2020
- Game time: 4:30 p.m. PST
- Game weather: Temperature: 59 °F (15 °C) • Wind: NE at 21 miles per hour (34 km/h) • Weather: Sunny Humidity at 59%
- Game attendance: 0
- TV announcers (ABC): Dave Pasch, Greg McElroy, Allison Williams

Game information

1st Quarter

- UCLA (3:05) – #1 Dorian Thompson-Robinson to #36 Ethan Fernea for a 33 yard pass TD (#2 Nicholas Barr-Mira kick) – UCLA 7–0 Drive 10 Plays, 85 yards, 4:13

2nd Quarter

- UCLA (8:41) – #1 Dorian Thompson-Robinson to #10 Demetric Felton for a 21 yard pass TD (#2 Nicholas Barr-Mira kick) – UCLA 14–0 Drive 6 Plays, 61 yards, 2:12
- USC (7:34) – #9 Kedon Slovis to #15 Drake London for a 65 yard pass TD (#48 Parker Lewis kick) UCLA 14–7 Drive 3 Plays, 75 yards, 1:07
- USC (3:26)- #48 Parker Lewis kicks a 42 yard field goal – UCLA 14–10 Drive 7 Plays, 3 yards, 3:29
- UCLA (0:20) – #1 Dorian Thompson-Robinson to #10 Demetric Felton for a 12 yard pass TD (#2 Nicholas Barr-Mira kick) – UCLA 21–10 Drive 11 Plays, 75 yards, 3:06

3rd Quarter

- UCLA (12:28) – #28 Brittain Brown runs for a 15 yard TD (#2 Nicholas Barr-Mira kick) – UCLA 28–10 Drive 7 Plays, 75 yards 2:32
- USC (10:25) – #9 Kedon Slovis to #21 Tyler Vaughns for a 38 yard pass TD (#48 Parker Lewis kick) – UCLA 28–17 Drive 7 Plays, 75 yards, 2:03
- USC (4:00) – #9 Kedon Slovis to #8 Amon-Ra St. Brown for a 3 yard pass TD (2 point Conversation failed) – UCLA 28–23 Drive 10 Plays, 31 yards, 4:03
- UCLA (1:16) – #1 Dorian Thompson-Robinson to #85 Greg Dulcich for a 69 yard pass TD (#2 Nicholas Barr-Mira kick) – UCLA 35–23 Drive 1 Play, 69 yards, 0:09

4th Quarter

- USC (11:40) – #29 Vavae Malepeai runs for a 10 yard TD (#48 Parker Lewis kick) – UCLA 35–30 Drive 11 Plays, 75 yards, 4:36
- USC (8:09) – #9 Kedon Slovis to #15 Drake London for a 9 yard pass TD (2 Point Conversion failed) – USC 36–35 Drive 6 Plays, 30 yards 2:10
- UCLA (0:52) – #2 Nicholas Barr-Mira kicks a 43 yard field goal – UCLA 38–36 Drive 7 Plays, 51 yards, 2:09
- USC (0:16) – #9 Kedon Slovis to #8 Amon-Ra St. Brown for a 8 yard pass TD (#48 Parker Lewis kick) – USC 43–38 Drive 2 Plays, 43 yards, 0:27

Passing

- USC – #9 Kedon Slovis 30/47 344 yds 5 touchdown 2 interception
- UCLA – #1 Dorian Thompson-Robinson 30/36 364 yds 4 touchdown 2 interception

Rushing

- USC – #29 Vavae Malepeai 19 Att, 110 yds, 1 touchdown
- UCLA – #10 Demetric Felton 21 Att, 90 yds, 0 touchdown

Receiving

- USC – #21 Tyler Vaughns 8 Rec, 128 yds, 1 touchdown
- UCLA – #85 Greg Dulcich 8 Rec, 167 yds, 1 touchdown

=== Oregon ===
Oregon Ducks vs USC Trojans (2020 Pac-12 Football Championship Game presented by 76)

Quarter	1	2	3	4	Total
Ducks	14	7	7	3	31
No. 13 Trojans	7	7	3	7	24

at Los Angeles Memorial Coliseum, Los Angeles, CA

- Date: December 18, 2020
- Game time: 5:00 p.m. PST
- Game weather: Temperature: 63 °F (17 °C) • Wind: NW at 6 miles per hour (9.7 km/h) • Weather: Sunny, Clear, Humidity at 51%
- Game attendance: 0
- Referee: Chris Coyte
- TV announcers (Fox): Joe Davis (play-by-play) and Mark Helfrich (analyst)

Game information

1st Quarter

- Oregon (13:49) – #13 Anthony Brown to #30 Jaylon Reed for a 2 yard pass TD (#90 Henry Katleman kick) – Oregon 7–0 Drive 3 Plays, 9 yards, 0:47
- Oregon (7:14) – #12 Tyler Shough to #48 Hunter Kampmoyer for a 14 yard pass TD (#90 Henry Katleman kick) – Oregon 14–0 Drive 3 Plays, 32 yards, 1:25
- USC (0:50) – #9 Kedon Slovis #8 Amon-Ra St. Brown for a 47 yard pass TD (#48 Parker Lewis kick) – Oregon 14–7 Drive 7 Plays, 87 yards, 2:46

2nd Quarter

- Oregon (9:45) – #12 Tyler Shough to #89 DJ Johnson for a 16 yard pass TD (#90 Henry Katleman kick) – Oregon 21–7 Drive 4 Plays, 41 yards, 1:53
- USC (4:35) #30 Markese Stepp for a 1 yard TD (#48 Parker Lewis kick) – Oregon 21–14 Drive 12 Plays, 80 yards, 5:04

3rd Quarter

- Oregon (7:20) – #13 Anthony Brown to #26 Travis Dye for a 4 yard pass TD (#90 Henry Katleman kick) – Oregon 28–14 Drive 14 Plays, 83 yards, 7:40
- USC (2:28) – #48 Parker Lewis kicks a 21 yard field goal – Oregon 28–17 Drive 12 Plays, 76 yards, 4:44

4th Quarter

- Oregon (10:26) – #90 Henry Katleman kicks a 40 yard field goal – Oregon 31–17 Drive 11 Plays, 58 yards, 6:00
- USC (6:16) – #9 Kedon Slovis to #4 Bru McCoy for a 4 yard pass TD (#48 Parker Lewis kick) – Oregon 31–24 Drive 12 Plays, 60 yards, 4:02

Passing leaders

- Oregon – #12 Tyler Shough 8/13 91 yds 2 touchdown 1 interception
  #13 Anthony Brown 1/1 2 yds 1 touchdown 0 interception
- USC – #9 Kedon Slovis 15/26 178 yds 3 touchdown 2 interception

Rushing leaders

- Oregon – #26 Travis Dye 8 Att, 47 yds, 0 touchdown
- USC – #7 Stephen Carr 9 Att, 35 yds, 0 touchdown

Receiving leaders

- Oregon – #89 DJ Johnson 2 Rec, 27 yds, 1 touchdown
- USC – #8 Amon-Ra St. Brown 3 Rec, 65 yds, 1 touchdown

== Rankings ==
Ranking movements Legend: ██ Increase in ranking ██ Decrease in ranking — = Not ranked RV = Received votes
	Week																	
Poll	Pre	1	2	3	4	5	6	7	8	9	10	11	12	13	14	15	16	Final
AP	17	—	—	—	RV	RV	25	24	21	20	20	20	19	17	15	13	21	21
Coaches	17	—	—	—	RV	RV	24	23	20	20	20	19	18	16	16	13	19	
CFP	Not released												18	20	15	13	17	Not released

== Statistics ==
Pac-12 opponents

	1	2	3	4	Total
USC	48	42	12	31	133
Pac-12 opponents	13	40	17	13	83

=== Offense ===
Passing statistics
#	NAME	POS	RAT	CMP	ATT	YDS	CMP%	TD	INT	LONG
9	Kedon Slovis	QB	140.0	70	98	706	71.43	3	1	48
	TOTALS		140.0	70	98	706	71.43	3	1	48
	OPPONENTS		138.10	35	59	420	59.32	4	1	75

Rushing statistics
#	NAME	POS	CAR	YDS	AVG	LONG	TD
30	Markese Stepp	TB	26	135	5.2	49	2
7	Stephen Carr	TB	21	126	6.0	37	2
29	Vavae Malepeai	TB	14	67	4.8	20	1
23	Kenan Christon	TB	1	4	4.0	4	0
9	Kedon Slovis	QB	7	22	3.1	24	0
–	Team	–	3	−6	−2.0	0	0
	TOTALS		72	348	4.8	49	5
	OPPONENTS		78	416	5.3	38	2

Receiving statistics
#	NAME	POS	REC	YDS	AVG	LONG	TD
8	Amon-Ra St. Brown	WR	14	213	15.21	48	0
15	Drake London	WR	12	193	16.08	31	1
21	Tyler Vaughns	WR	14	123	8.79	20	0
4	Bru McCoy	WR	8	76	9.50	26	1
80	John Jackson III	WR	1	23	23.00	23	0
1	Gary Bryant Jr.	WR	1	3	3.00	3	0
84	Erik Krommenhoek	TE	1	6	6.00	6	1
18	Jude Wolfe	TE	2	5	2.50	4	0
29	Vavae Malepeai	TB	9	43	4.78	16	0
7	Stephen Carr	TB	5	12	2.40	12	0
30	Markese Stepp	TB	2	12	6.00	9	0
23	Kenan Christon	TB	1	−3	−3.00	0	0
	TOTALS		70	706	10.09	48	3
	OPPONENTS		35	420	12.00	75	4

=== Defense ===
Defense statistics
#	NAME	POS	SOLO	AST	TOT	TFL-YDS	SACK-YDS	INT	BU	QBH	FR-YDS	FF	BLK	SAF	TD
93	Marlon Tuipulotu	DL	11	5	16	2.5–14	1.0–11	–	–	–	–	–	–	–	–
50	Nick Figueroa	DL	3	6	9	2.0–5	0.5–2	–	–	–	–	–	–	–	–
49	Tuli Tuipulotu	DL	4	1	5	–	–	–	–	–	–	–	–	–	–
96	Caleb Tremblay	DL	0	2	2	0.5–2	–	–	–	–	–	–	–	–	–
90	Connor Murphy	DL	1	0	1	–	–	–	–	–	–	–	–	–	–
47	Stanley Ta'ufo'ou	DL	1	0	1	–	–	–	–	–	–	–	–	–	–
99	Drake Jackson	BB	5	3	8	3.0–21	2.0–17	–	–	–	–	–	–	–	–
31	Hunter Echols	BB	3	0	3	–	–	–	–	–	–	–	–	–	–
10	Ralen Goforth	LB	3	8	11	1.0–1	–	–	–	–	–	–	–	–	–
1	Palaie Gaoteote IV	LB	2	7	9	–	–	–	–	–	–	–	–	–	–
26	Kana'i Mauga	LB	2	2	4	–	–	–	–	–	–	–	–	–	–
18	Raymond Scott	LB	2	1	3	1.0–4	1.0–4	–	–	–	–	–	–	–	–
15	Talanoa Hufanga	DB	11	3	14	0.5–0	–	1	–	–	–	1	–	–	–
21	Isaiah Pola-Mao	DB	9	3	12	1.0–14	–	–	2	–	1–0	–	–	–	–
9	Greg Johnson	DB	6	4	10	1.0–6	–	–	1	–	–	–	–	–	–
2	Olaijah Griffin	DB	5	3	8	–	–	–	2	–	–	–	–	–	–
4	Max Williams	DB	1	3	4	0.5–3	0.5–3	–	–	–	–	–	–	–	–
8	Chris Steele	DB	4	0	4	–	–	–	2	–	–	–	–	–	–
6	Isaac Taylor-Stuart	DB	0	1	1	–	–	–	–	–	–	–	–	–	–
14	Jayden Williams	DB	1	0	1	–	–	–	–	–	–	–	–	–	–
22	Dorian Hewett	DB	1	0	1	–	–	–	–	–	–	–	–	–	–
25	Briton Allen	DB	1	0	1	–	–	–	–	–	–	–	–	–	–
4	Bru McCoy	WR	0	0	0	–	–	–	–	–	1–0	–	–	–	–
27	Quincy Jountti	TB	0	0	0	–	–	–	–	–	1–0	–	–	–	–
	TOTAL		76	52	128	13.0–70	5.0–37	1	7	0	3	1	0	0	-
	OPPONENTS		90	84	174	15.0–44	3.0–19	1	9	0	3	3	0	0	0

Key: POS: Position, SOLO: Solo Tackles, AST: Assisted Tackles, TOT: Total Tackles, TFL: Tackles-for-loss, SACK: Quarterback Sacks, INT: Interceptions, BU: Passes Broken Up, PD: Passes Defended, QBH: Quarterback Hits, FR: Fumbles Recovered, FF: Forced Fumbles, BLK: Kicks or Punts Blocked, SAF: Safeties, TD : Touchdown

=== Special teams ===
Kicking statistics
#	NAME	POS	XPM	XPA	XP%	FGM	FGA	FG%	1–19	20–29	30–39	40–49	50+	LNG	PTS
48	Parker Lewis	PK	8	8	100%	2	3	66.67%	0/0	1/2	1/1	0/0	0/0	30	14
	TOTALS		8	8	100%	2	3	66.67%	0/0	1/2	1/1	0/0	0/0	30	14
	OPPONENTS		6	6	100%	5	6	83.33%	0/0	0/0	0/0	2/2	3/4	51	21

Kickoff statistics
#	NAME	POS	KICKS	YDS	AVG	TB	OB
48	Parker Lewis	PK	11	633	57.5	5	2
	TOTALS		11	633	57.5	5	2
	OPPONENTS		13	838	64.5	8	0

Punting statistics
#	NAME	POS	PUNTS	YDS	AVG	LONG	TB	I–20	50+	BLK
24	Ben Griffiths	P	6	281	46.83	61	1	3	4	0
	TOTALS		6	281	46.83	61	1	3	4	0
	OPPONENTS		8	394	49.25	58	1	3	4	0

Kick return statistics
#	NAME	POS	RTNS	YDS	AVG	TD	LNG
2	Olaijah Griffin	CB	3	52	17.33	0	27
8	Amon-Ra St. Brown	WR	2	43	21.50	0	23
	TOTALS		5	95	19.00	0	27
	OPPONENTS		2	46	23.00	0	22

Punt return statistics
#	NAME	POS	RTNS	YDS	AVG	TD	LONG
8	Amon-Ra St. Brown	WR	4	32	8.00	0	11
	TOTALS		4	32	8.00	0	11
	OPPONENTS		2	3	1.50	0	2

== Players drafted into the NFL ==
Round	Pick	Player	Position	NFL Club
1	14	Alijah Vera-Tucker	OG	New York Jets
4	106	Jay Tufele	DT	Jacksonville Jaguars
4	112	Amon-Ra St. Brown	WR	Detroit Lions
5	180	Talanoa Hufanga	S	San Francisco 49ers
6	189	Marlon Tuipulotu	DT	Philadelphia Eagles
