= 2020 Oregon Ducks football team =

American college football season

2020 Oregon Ducks football

Pac-12 champion

Pac-12 Championship Game, W 31-24 vs. USC

Fiesta Bowl, L 17–34 vs. Iowa State
- Conference: Pac-12 Conference
- North Division
- Record: 4–3 (3–2 Pac-12)
- Head coach: Mario Cristobal (3rd season)
- Offensive coordinator: Joe Moorhead (1st season)
- Offensive scheme: Spread
- Defensive coordinator: Andy Avalos (2nd season)
- Base defense: 4–2–5
- Captain: Game captains
- Home stadium: Autzen Stadium

2020 Pac-12 Conference football standings
	Conf.			Overall
Team	W		L	W		L
North Division
Washington x	3	–	1	3	–	1
Oregon y$	3	–	2	4	–	3
Stanford	4	–	2	4	–	2
California	1	–	3	1	–	3
Washington State	1	–	3	1	–	3
Oregon State	2	–	5	2	–	5
South Division
No. 21 USC xy	5	–	0	5	–	1
Colorado	3	–	1	4	–	2
Utah	3	–	2	3	–	2
Arizona State	2	–	2	2	–	2
UCLA	3	–	4	3	–	4
Arizona	0	–	5	0	–	5
Championship: Oregon 31, USC 24
$ – Conference champion; x – Division champion/co-champions; y – Championship game participant; Note: Due to COVID-19, the Pac-12 suspended the season on August 11, but later decided to begin play on November 6. In addition to the title game on December 18, the conference seeded all remaining teams for a game during that weekend.; Rankings from AP Poll.

The 2020 Oregon Ducks football team represented the University of Oregon during the 2020 NCAA Division I FBS football season. The team was led by third-year head coach Mario Cristobal. The Ducks played their home games at Autzen Stadium in Eugene, Oregon, and competed as members of the North Division of the Pac-12 Conference.

On August 11, 2020, the Pac-12 Conference canceled all fall sports competitions due to the COVID-19 pandemic. However, the decision was reversed on September 24, when the Pac-12 announced that they would play a seven-game schedule starting November 6.

Despite finishing in second place in the North Division during the regular season, the Ducks would represent the division in the Pac-12 Championship Game due to first-place Washington having an insufficient number of players available due to COVID-19. There, they defeated the undefeated South Division champion USC to receive the Pac-12's automatic bid to a New Year's Six bowl game. They were invited to the Fiesta Bowl, where they lost to Big 12 runner-up Iowa State.

== Pac-12 media day ==
=== Pac-12 media poll ===
In the Pac-12 preseason media poll, Oregon was voted as the favorite to win both the North Division and the Pac-12 Championship Game.

Media poll (North Division)
Predicted finish	Team	Votes (1st place)
1	Oregon	222 (35)
2	California	176 (3)
3	Washington	161
4	Stanford	105
5	Oregon State	76
6	Washington State	58

Media poll (Pac-12 Championship)
Rank	Team	Votes
1	Oregon	21
2	USC	15
3	Arizona State	1
4	Utah	1

== Schedule ==
Oregon had three games scheduled against Ohio State, North Dakota State, and Hawaii, but canceled these games on July 10 due to the Pac-12 Conference's decision to play a conference-only schedule due to the COVID-19 pandemic.

Oregon's game against UCLA had initially been scheduled for Friday, November 20, but was moved forward a day to accommodate UCLA playing California on Sunday, November 15. The change occurred after both UCLA and California had their initially scheduled games for Saturday, November 14 (against Utah and Arizona State, respectively), canceled due to COVID-19 outbreaks within the other programs.

On December 14, Oregon's scheduled game against Colorado in Los Angeles for December 19 was canceled after the Ducks were elevated into the Pac-12 Championship Game against USC. The change occurred after Washington had a COVID-19 outbreak.

Original 2020 Oregon Ducks schedule
Date	Opponent	Site
September 5	North Dakota State*	Autzen Stadium • Eugene, OR
September 12	Ohio State*	Autzen Stadium • Eugene, OR
September 19	Hawaii*	Autzen Stadium • Eugene, OR
September 26	at Colorado	Folsom Field • Boulder, CO
October 3	Washington	Autzen Stadium • Eugene, OR (rivalry)
October 17	at California	California Memorial Stadium • Berkeley, CA
October 24	Stanford	Autzen Stadium • Eugene, OR (rivalry)
October 31	at Arizona	Arizona Stadium • Tucson, AZ
November 7	USC	Autzen Stadium • Eugene, OR (rivalry)
November 13	Arizona State	Autzen Stadium • Eugene, OR
November 21	at Washington State	Martin Stadium • Pullman, WA
November 28	at Oregon State	Reser Stadium • Corvallis, OR (rivalry)

Date	Time	Opponent	Rank	Site	TV	Result	Attendance	Source
November 7	4:30 p.m.	Stanford	No. 12	Autzen Stadium; Eugene, OR (rivalry)	ABC	W 35–14	0	
November 14	4:00 p.m.	at Washington State	No. 11	Martin Stadium; Pullman, WA	FOX	W 43–29		
November 21	12:30 p.m.	UCLA	No. 11	Autzen Stadium; Eugene, OR	ESPN2	W 38–35		
November 27	4:00 p.m.	at Oregon State	No. 9	Reser Stadium; Corvallis, Oregon (rivalry)	ESPN	L 38–41		
December 5	4:00 p.m.	at California	No. 21	California Memorial Stadium; Berkeley, CA	ESPN	L 17–21		
December 12	1:00 p.m.	Washington		Autzen Stadium; Eugene, OR (rivalry)	FOX	No contest		
December 18	5:00 p.m.	at No. 13 USC*		Los Angeles Memorial Coliseum; Los Angeles, CA (Pac-12 Championship Game, rivalry)	FOX	W 31–24	0	
January 2	1:00 p.m.	vs. No. 10 Iowa State*	No. 25	State Farm Stadium; Glendale, AZ (Fiesta Bowl)	ESPN	L 17–34	0	
*Non-conference game; Rankings from AP Poll released prior to the game; All times are in Pacific time

== Rankings ==
Ranking movements Legend: ██ Increase in ranking ██ Decrease in ranking — = Not ranked RV = Received votes
	Week																	
Poll	Pre	1	2	3	4	5	6	7	8	9	10	11	12	13	14	15	16	Final
AP	9	—	—	—	14	12	12	13	14	12	11	11	9	21			25	RV
Coaches	9	—	—	—	—	17	16	15	15	14	12	13	11	20	RV	RV	RV	
CFP	Not released												15	23			25	Not released

== Game summaries ==
=== Stanford ===
Uniform combination
Helmet	Jersey	Pants

Stanford Cardinal vs. Oregon Ducks – Game summary

Quarter	1	2	3	4	Total
Cardinal	7	0	0	7	14
No. 12 Ducks	7	7	14	7	35

at Autzen Stadium • Eugene, Oregon

- Date: November 7, 2020
- Game time: 4:30 p.m. PST
- Game weather: Cloudy, 46 °F (8 °C)
- Game attendance: 0
- Referee: Michael Mothershed
- TV: ABC

Game information

First quarter

- STAN – Austin Jones 4-yard run (Jet Toner kick), 3:25. Stanford 7–0. Drive: 9 plays, 80 yards, 5:30.
- ORE – C. J. Verdell 10-yard run (Camden Lewis kick), 0:54. Tied 7–7. Drive: 7 plays, 87 yards, 2:31.

Second quarter

- ORE – D. J. Johnson 5-yard pass from Tyler Shough (Camden Lewis kick), 1:05. Oregon 14–7. Drive: 10 plays, 96 yards, 3:59.

Third quarter

- ORE – Travis Dye 14-yard run (Camden Lewis kick), 11:13. Oregon 21–7. Drive: 9 plays, 75 yards, 3:47.
- ORE – Tyler Shough 9-yard run (Camden Lewis kick), 0:53. Oregon 28–7. Drive: 10 plays, 80 yards, 3:57.

Fourth quarter

- STAN – Austin Jones 2-yard run (Jet Toner kick), 7:39. Oregon 28–14. Drive: 3 plays, 80 yards, 1:32.
- ORE – Cyrus Habibi-Lakio 4-yard run (Camden Lewis kick), 3:37. Oregon 35–14. Drive: 9 plays, 73 yards, 4:02.

Top passers

- STAN – Jack West – 13/19, 154 yards
- ORE – Tyler Shough – 17/26, 227 yards, 1 TD, 1 INT

Top rushers

- STAN – Austin Jones – 20 carries, 100 yards, 2 TD
- ORE – C. J. Verdell – 20 carries, 105 yards, 1 TD

Top receivers

- STAN – Simi Fehoko – 3 receptions, 88 yards
- ORE – Johnny Johnson III – 4 receptions, 60 yards

=== At Washington State ===
Uniform combination
Helmet	Jersey	Pants

Oregon Ducks vs. Washington State Cougars – Game summary

Quarter	1	2	3	4	Total
No. 11 Ducks	7	7	7	22	43
Cougars	13	6	0	10	29

at Martin Stadium • Pullman, Washington

- Date: November 14, 2020
- Game time: 4:30 p.m. PST
- Game attendance: 0
- TV: ESPN

Game information

First quarter

- ORE – D. J. Johnson 13 Yd pass from Tyler Shough (Camden Lewis Kick), 6:48. Oregon 7–0. Drive: 15 plays, 92 yards, 5:50.
- WSU – Lucas Bacon 18 Yd pass from Jayden de Laura (2pt Failed), 3:00. Oregon 7–6. Drive: 6 plays, 77 yards, 3:48.
- WSU – Renard Bell 4 Yd pass from Jayden de Laura (Blake Mazza Kick), 0:48. Washington State 13–7. Drive: 4 plays, 53 yards, 1:33.

Second quarter

- WSU – Blake Mazza 39 Yd Field Goal, 9:38. Washington State 16–7. Drive: 7 plays, 35 yards, 3:00.
- WSU – Blake Mazza 49 Yd Field Goal, 0:24. Washington State 19–7. Drive: 13 plays, 59 yards, 6:19.
- ORE – C.J. Verdell 3 Yd Run (Camden Lewis Kick), 0:03. Washington State 19–14. Drive: 2 plays, 60 yards, 0:17.

Third quarter

- ORE – Travis Dye 16 Yd pass from Tyler Shough (Camden Lewis Kick), 3:26. Oregon 21–19. Drive: 5 plays, 68 yards, 2:09.

Fourth quarter

- ORE – Johnny Johnson III 2 Yd pass from Tyler Shough (Camden Lewis Kick), 14:19. Oregon 28–19. Drive: 7 plays, 80 yards, 3:06.
- WSU – Blake Mazza 25 Yd Field Goal, 9:59. Oregon 28–22. Drive: 7 plays, 79 yards, 4:20.
- ORE – Travis Dye 71 Yd pass from Tyler Shough (Tyler Shough Run), 8:25. Oregon 36–22. Drive: 3 plays, 75 yards, 1:34.
- WSU – Deon McIntosh 1 Yd Run (Blake Mazza Kick), 4:40. Oregon 36–29. Drive: 9 plays, 74 yards, 3:45.
- ORE – Cyrus Habibi-Likio 1 Yd Run (Camden Lewis Kick), 1:40. Oregon 43–29. Drive: 6 plays, 75 yards, 3:00.

Top passers

- ORE – Tyler Shough – 21/30, 312 yards, 4 TD, 1 INT
- WSU – Jayden de Laura – 25/39, 329 yards, 2 TD

Top rushers

- ORE – C.J. Verdell – 18 carries, 118 yards, 1 TD
- WSU – Deon McIntosh – 18 carries, 92 yards, 1 TD

Top receivers

- ORE – Jaylon Redd – 5 receptions, 99 yards
- WSU – Renard Bell – 10 receptions, 158 yards, 1 TD

=== UCLA ===
Uniform combination
Helmet	Jersey	Pants

UCLA Bruins vs. Oregon Ducks – Game summary

Quarter	1	2	3	4	Total
Bruins	7	14	7	7	35
No. 11 Ducks	14	10	14	0	38

at Autzen Stadium • Eugene, Oregon

- Date: November 21, 2020
- Game time: 12:30 p.m. PST
- Game attendance: 0
- Referee: Mark Duddy
- TV announcers (ESPN2): Jason Benetti, Andre Ware, Taylor McGregor

Game information

First quarter

- ORE – Devon Williams 19-yard pass from Tyler Shough (Camden Lewis kick), 5:39. Oregon 7–0. Drive: 1 play, 19 yards, 0:15.
- ORE – Travis Dye 32-yard pass from Tyler Shough (Camden Lewis kick), 5:23. Oregon 14–0. Drive: 1 play, 27 yards, 0:08.
- UCLA – Demetric Felton 1-yard run (Nicholas Barr-Mira kick), 2:15. Oregon 14–7. Drive: 6 plays, 52 yards, 3:08.

Second quarter

- UCLA – Qwuantrezz Knight 20-yard fumble return (Nicholas Barr-Mira kick), 13:21. Tied 14–14. Drive: 1 play, -3 yards, 0:07.
- ORE – Camden Lewis 23-yard field goal, 7:14. Oregon 17–14. Drive: 13 plays, 70 yards, 6:07.
- UCLA – Greg Dulcich 32-yard pass from Chase Griffin (Nicholas Barr-Mira kick), 3:24. UCLA 21–17. Drive: 10 plays, 69 yards, 3:50.
- ORE – Jordan Happle 58-yard interception return (Camden Lewis kick), 0:00. Oregon 24–21. Drive: 5 plays, 34 yards, 0:50.

Third quarter

- ORE – CJ Verdell 4-yard run (Camden Lewis kick), 11:48. Oregon 31–21. Drive: 7 plays, 75 yards, 3:12.
- UCLA – Brittain Brown 2-yard run (Nicholas Barr-Mira kick), 7:39. Oregon 31–28. Drive: 13 plays, 75 yards, 4:09.
- ORE – Hunter Kampmoyer 12-yard pass from Tyler Shough (Camden Lewis kick), 1:24. Oregon 38–28. Drive: 5 plays, 78 yards, 2:19.

Fourth quarter

- UCLA – Demetric Felton 11-yard run (Nicholas Barr-Mira kick), 3:43. Oregon 38–35. Drive: 12 plays, 90 yards, 3:33.

Top passers

- UCLA – Chase Griffin – 19/31, 195 yards, TD, 2 INT
- ORE – Tyler Shough – 19/30, 334 yards, 3 TD

Top rushers

- UCLA – Demetric Felton – 34 rushes, 167 yards, 2 TD
- ORE – Travis Dye – 10 rushes, 40 yards

Top receivers

- UCLA – Kyle Philips – 8 receptions, 91 yards
- ORE – Devon Williams – 6 receptions, 123 yards, TD

=== At Oregon State ===
Uniform combination
Helmet	Jersey	Pants

Oregon Ducks vs. Oregon State Beavers – Game summary

Quarter	1	2	3	4	Total
No. 15 Ducks	14	10	7	7	38
Beavers	7	6	6	22	41

at Reser Stadium • Corvallis, Oregon

- Date: November 27, 2020
- Game time: 4:30 p.m. PST
- Game attendance: 0
- TV: ESPN

Game information

First quarter

- ORE – Jaylon Redd 37-yard run (Henry Katleman kick), 11:52. Oregon 7–0. Drive: 8 plays, 77 yards, 3:08.
- OSU – Jermar Jefferson 82-yard run (Everett Hayes kick), 10:59. Tied 7–7. Drive: 2 plays, 91 yards, 0:53.
- ORE – Tyler Shough 1-yard run (Henry Katleman kick), 5:21. Oregon 14–7. Drive: 11 plays, 93 yards, 5:38.

Second quarter

- OSU – Everett Hayes 34-yard field goal, 13:38. Oregon 14–10. Drive: 10 plays, 83 yards, 3:49.
- ORE – Devon Williams 60-yard pass from Tyler Shough (Henry Katleman kick), 10:57. Oregon 21–10. Drive: 6 plays, 75 yards, 2:41.
- OSU – Everett Hayes 48-yard field goal, 5:55. Oregon 21–13. Drive: 11 plays, 45 yards, 5:02.
- ORE – Henry Katleman 33-yard field goal, 0:46. Oregon 24–13. Drive: 6 plays, 29 yards, 2:00.

Third quarter

- OSU – Zeriah Beason 8-yard pass from Tristan Gebbia (pass failed), 8:57. Oregon 24–19. Drive: 6 plays, 38 yards, 3:08.
- ORE – Hunter Kampmoyer 4-yard pass from Tyler Shough (Henry Katleman kick), 6:43. Oregon 31–19. Drive: 6 plays, 74 yards, 2:14.

Fourth quarter

- OSU – Tristan Gebbia 1-yard run (Everett Hayes kick), 13:26. Oregon 31–26. Drive: 16 plays, 92 yards, 8:17.
- OSU – Jermar Jefferson 2-yard run (Tristan Gebbia run), 12:23. Oregon State 34–31. Drive: 2 plays, 33 yards, 0:15.
- ORE – Cyrus Habibi-Likio 1-yard run (Henry Katleman kick), 8:27. Oregon 38–34. Drive: 10 plays, 75 yards, 3:56.
- OSU – Chance Nolan 1-yard run (Everett Hayes kick), 0:33. Oregon State 41–38. Drive: 10 plays, 53 yards, 1:22.

Top passers

- ORE – Tyler Shough – 20/31, 285 yards, 2 TD, 2 INT
- OSU – Tristan Gebbia – 23/37, 263 yards, TD

Top rushers

- ORE – Travis Dye – 12 rushes, 93 yards
- OSU – Jermar Jefferson – 29 rushes, 226 yards, 2 TD

Top receivers

- ORE – Devon Williams – 4 receptions, 101 yards, TD
- OSU – Kolby Taylor – 7 receptions, 114 yards

=== At California ===
Uniform combination
Helmet	Jersey	Pants

Oregon Ducks vs. California Golden Bears – Game summary

Quarter	1	2	3	4	Total
No. 23 Ducks	3	14	0	0	17
Golden Bears	7	7	7	0	21

at California Memorial Stadium • Berkeley, California

- Date: December 5, 2020
- Game time: 4:05 p.m.
- Game weather: Partly cloudy, 60 °F (16 °C)
- Game attendance: 0
- Referee: Francisco Vilar
- TV announcers (ESPN): Dave Flemming, Rod Gilmore, Taylor McGregor

Game information

First quarter

- ORE – Henry Katleman 21-yard field goal, 8:06. Oregon 3–0. Drive: 10 plays, 75 yards, 3:19.
- CAL – Chase Garbers 1-yard run (Dario Longhetto kick), 2:23. California 7–3. Drive: 13 plays, 75 yards, 5:43.

Second quarter

- CAL – Bradrick Shaw 1-yard run (Dario Longhetto kick), 5:31. California 14–3. Drive: 19 plays, 80 yards, 9:51.
- ORE – Johnny Johnson III 39-yard pass from Tyler Shough (Henry Katleman kick), 2:08. California 14–10. Drive: 7 plays, 75 yards, 3:23.
- ORE – Cyrus Habibi-Likio 1-yard run (Henry Katleman kick), 0:23. Oregon 17–14. Drive: 3 plays, 75 yards, 0:23.

Third quarter

- CAL – Nikko Remigio 28-yard pass from Chase Garbers (Dario Longhetto kick), 5:14. California 21–17. Drive: 5 plays, 64 yards, 2:21.

Fourth quarter

- No scoring plays.

Top passers

- ORE – Tyler Shough – 14/26, 231 yards, TD
- CAL – Chase Garbers – 20/32, 183 yards, TD

Top rushers

- ORE – Travis Dye – 12 rushes, 71 yards
- CAL – Marcel Dancy – 5 rushes, 34 yards

Top receivers

- ORE – Travis Dye – 2 receptions, 85 yards
- CAL – Nikko Remigio – 6 receptions, 81 yards, TD

=== At USC (Pac-12 Championship Game) ===
Uniform combination
Helmet	Jersey	Pants

Oregon Ducks vs. USC Trojans – Game summary

Quarter	1	2	3	4	Total
Ducks	14	7	7	3	31
No. 13 Trojans	7	7	3	7	24

at Los Angeles Memorial Coliseum • Los Angeles, California

- Date: December 18, 2020
- Game time: 5:00 p.m.
- Game weather: Clear, 61 °F (16 °C)
- Game attendance: 1
- Referee: Chris Coyte
- TV announcers (FOX): Joe Davis, Mark Helfrich

Game information

First quarter

- ORE – Jaylon Redd 2-yard pass from Anthony Brown (Henry Katleman kick), 13:49. Oregon 7–0. Drive: 3 plays, 9 yards, 0:46.
- ORE – Hunter Kampmoyer 14-yard pass from Tyler Shough (Henry Katleman kick), 7:14. Oregon 14–0. Drive: 3 plays, 32 yards, 1:25.
- USC – Amon-Ra St. Brown 47-yard pass from Kedon Slovis (Parker Lewis kick), 0:50. Oregon 14–7. Drive: 7 plays, 87 yards, 2:46.

Second quarter

- ORE – D. J. Johnson 16-yard pass from Tyler Shough (Henry Katleman kick), 9:45. Oregon 21–7. Drive: 4 plays, 41 yards, 1:53.
- USC – Markese Stepp 1-yard run (Parker Lewis kick), 4:35. Oregon 21–14. Drive: 12 plays, 80 yards, 5:04.

Third quarter

- ORE – Travis Dye 4-yard pass from Tyler Shough (Henry Katleman kick), 7:20. Oregon 28–14. Drive: 14 plays, 83 yards, 7:40.
- USC – Parker Lewis 21-yard field goal, 2:28. Oregon 28–17. Drive: 12 plays, 76 yards, 4:44.

Fourth quarter

- ORE – Henry Katleman 40-yard field goal, 10:26. Oregon 31–17. Drive: 11 plays, 58 yards, 6:00.
- USC – Bru McCoy 4-yard pass from Kedon Slovis (Parker Lewis kick), 6:16. Oregon 31–24. Drive: 12 plays, 60 yards, 4:02.

Top passers

- ORE – Tyler Shough – 8/15, 91 yards, 2 TD, INT
- USC – Kedon Slovis – 28/52, 320 yards, 2 TD, 3 INT

Top rushers

- ORE – Travis Dye – 11 rushes, 55 yards
- USC – Stephen Carr – 12 rushes, 40 yards

Top receivers

- ORE – D. J. Johnsno – 2 receptions, 27 yards, TD
- USC – Bru McCoy – 6 receptions, 76 yards, TD

=== vs Iowa State (2021 Fiesta Bowl) ===
Uniform combination
Helmet	Jersey	Pants

Iowa State vs Oregon – Game summary

Quarter	1	2	3	4	Total
No. 25 Ducks	7	10	0	0	17
No. 10 Cyclones	7	21	6	0	34

at State Farm Stadium • Glendale, Arizona

- Date: January 2, 2021
- Game time: 1:00 p.m.
- Game weather: n/a (game played indoors)
- Game attendance: 0
- TV: ESPN

Game information

First quarter
Second quarter
Third quarter
Fourth quarter

Top passers

- ORE –
- ISU –

Top rushers

- ORE –
- ISU –

Top receivers

- ORE –
- ISU −

== Players drafted into the NFL ==
Round	Pick	Player	Position	NFL club
1	7	Penei Sewell	OT	Detroit Lions
2	36	Jevon Holland	S	Miami Dolphins
5	172	Deommodore Lenoir	CB	San Francisco 49ers
6	215	Brady Breeze	S	Tennessee Titans
6	228	Thomas Graham Jr.	CB	Chicago Bears
