= 2020 Pac-12 Football Championship Game =

- Conference championship
Oregon Ducks	USC Trojans
(3–2)	(5–0)
31	24
Head coach: Mario Cristobal	Head coach: Clay Helton
	AP / Coaches / CFP; 13 / 13 / 13
	1	2	3	4	Total
Oregon	14	7	7	3	31
USC	7	7	3	7	24
- Date: December 18, 2020
- Season: 2020
- Stadium: Los Angeles Memorial Coliseum
- Location: Los Angeles, CA
- MVP: Kayvon Thibodeaux, Oregon
- Favorite: USC by 3
- Referee: Chris Coyte
- Attendance: N/A (Behind closed doors)

United States TV coverage
- Network: Fox; ESPN Radio
- Announcers: Fox: Joe Davis (play-by-play) and Mark Helfrich (analyst); ESPN Radio: Sean Kelley (play-by-play) and Barrett Jones (analyst)

2020 Pac-12 Conference football standings
	Conf.			Overall
Team	W		L	W		L
North Division
Washington x	3	–	1	3	–	1
Oregon y$	4	–	2	4	–	3
Stanford	4	–	2	4	–	2
California	1	–	3	1	–	3
Washington State	1	–	3	1	–	3
Oregon State	2	–	5	2	–	5
South Division
No. 21 USC xy	5	–	0	5	–	1
Colorado	3	–	1	4	–	2
Utah	3	–	2	3	–	2
Arizona State	2	–	2	2	–	2
UCLA	3	–	4	3	–	4
Arizona	0	–	5	0	–	5
Championship: Oregon 31, USC 24
$ – Conference champion; x – Division champion/co-champions; y – Championship game participant; Note: Due to COVID-19, the Pac-12 suspended the season on August 11, but later decided to begin play on November 6. In addition to the title game on December 18, the conference seeded all remaining teams for a game during that weekend.; Rankings from AP Poll.

The 2020 Pac-12 Football Championship Game (branded as the Pac-12 Football Championship Game presented by 76 for sponsorship reasons) was a college football game played on Friday, December 18, 2020, at Los Angeles Memorial Coliseum in Los Angeles, California, to determine the 2020 champion of the Pac-12 Conference. The game featured the North division's then second place Oregon and the South division champions USC, and is the conference's tenth championship game. Washington, the North division champion, was unable to participate due to having insufficient players available.

This game was originally to be held at Allegiant Stadium in Paradise, Nevada, as part of a new two-year deal. Due to the COVID-19 pandemic, the game was pulled from Las Vegas, and was instead hosted at the home stadium of USC.

== Teams ==
The 2020 Pac–12 Football Championship Game featured the Oregon Ducks, then second place in the North Division, and the USC Trojans, South Division champions. Oregon and USC had met 61 times previously before this game, with USC holding a 38–21–1 advantage in the series. The two teams did not meet during the 2020 regular season.

=== Oregon ===
Oregon was selected to represent the North Division after division winner Washington did not have the minimum number of scholarship players available to participate in the game due to the COVID-19 pandemic. The week before, Washington had to cancel its game against Oregon for the same reason. This marks Oregon's fourth overall appearance in the Pac-12 championship game, having won in all three of their prior appearances. The Ducks are the defending Pac-12 champions, having defeated Utah in the 2019 title game. Oregon enters the contest with a 3–2 record.

=== USC ===
USC secured its spot in the game with its December 13 win over UCLA. This is USC's third appearance in the championship game, having last appeared the 2017 game. USC entered the game with an 5–0 record in the regular season and in Pac-12 play. The Trojans were designated as the home team, based on their better overall record.

== Game summary ==
2020 Pac-12 Football Championship Game presented by 76

Quarter	1	2	3	4	Total
Oregon	14	7	7	3	31
No. 13 USC	7	7	3	7	24

at Los Angeles Memorial Coliseum • Los Angeles, CA

- Date: Friday, December 18, 2020
- Game time: 8:00 p.m. EST (5:00 p.m. PST)
- Game weather: Temperature: 63 °F (17 °C) • Wind: NW at 6 miles per hour (9.7 km/h) • Weather: Sunny, Clear, Humidity at 51%
- Game attendance: N/A (Behind closed doors)
- Referee: Chris Coyte
- TV announcers (Fox): Joe Davis (play-by-play) and Mark Helfrich (analyst)

Game information

First quarter

- (13:49) ORE – Jaylon Redd 2 yard pass from Anthony Brown, Henry Katleman kick (Drive: 3 plays, 9 yards, 0:46; Oregon 7–0)
- (7:14) ORE – Hunter Kampmoyer 14 yard pass from Tyler Shough, Henry Katleman kick (Drive: 3 plays, 32 yards, 1:25; Oregon 14–0)
- (0:50) USC – Amon-Ra St. Brown 47 yard pass from Kedon Slovis, Parker Lewis kick (Drive: 7 plays, 87 yards, 2:46; Oregon 14–7)

Second quarter

- (9:45) ORE – DJ Johnson 16 yard pass from Tyler Shough, Henry Katleman kick (Drive: 4 plays, 41 yards, 1:53; Oregon 21–7)
- (4:35) USC – Markese Stepp 1 yard rush, Parker Lewis kick (Drive: 12 plays, 80 yards, 5:04; Oregon 21–14)

Third quarter

- (7:20) ORE – Travis Dye 4 yard pass from Tyler Shough, Henry Katleman kick (Drive: 14 plays, 83 yards, 7:40; Oregon 28–14)
- (2:28) USC – Parker Lewis 21 yard field goal (Drive: 12 plays, 76 yards, 4:44; Oregon 28–17)

Fourth quarter

- (10:26) ORE – Henry Katleman 40 yard field goal (Drive: 11 plays, 58 yards, 6:00; Oregon 31–17)
- (6:16) USC – Bru McCoy 4 yard pass from Kedon Slovis, Parker Lewis kick (Drive: 12 plays, 60 yards, 4:02; Oregon 31–24)

=== Statistics ===
Statistics	ORE	USC
First downs	16	25
Plays–yards	60–243	80–358
Rushes–yards	41–135	28–38
Passing yards	108	320
Passing: comp–att–int	11–19–1	28–52–3
Time of possession	30:46	29:14

Team	Category	Player	Statistics
Oregon	Passing	Tyler Shough	8/15, 91 yards 2 TD, 1 INT
Oregon	Rushing	Travis Dye	11 carries, 55 yards
Oregon	Receiving	DJ Johnson	2 receptions, 27 yards, 1 TD
USC	Passing	Kedon Slovis	28/52, 320 yards, 2 TD, 3 INT
USC	Rushing	Stephen Carr	12 carries, 40 yards
USC	Receiving	Bru McCoy	6 receptions, 76 yards, 1 TD

== See also ==
- List of Pac-12 Conference football champions
