= Olaijah Griffin =

American football player (born 1999)

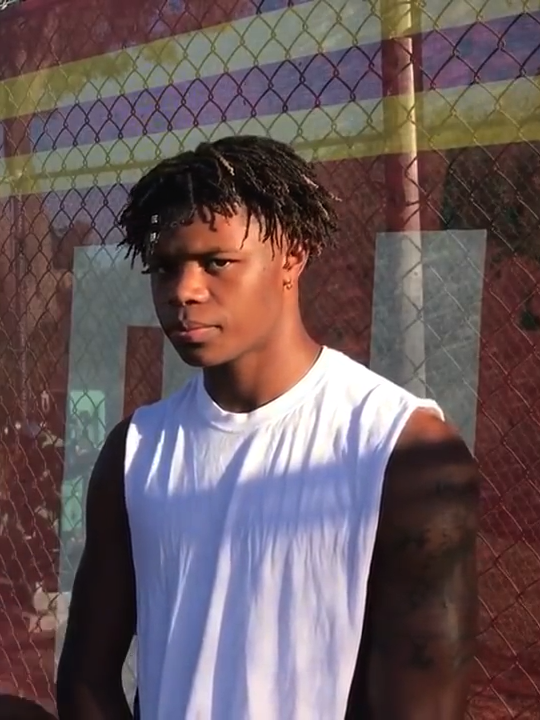
- Griffin in 2017

No. 38
- Position: Cornerback

Personal information
- Born: March 10, 1999 (age 27); Mission Viejo, California, U.S.
- Listed height: 5 ft 11 in (1.80 m)
- Listed weight: 176 lb (80 kg)

Career information
- High school: Mission Viejo High School
- College: USC
- NFL draft: 2021: undrafted

Career history
- Buffalo Bills (2021–2022)*; New York Giants (2022)*; Seattle Sea Dragons (2023)
- * Offseason or practice squad member only
- Stats at Pro Football Reference

Olaijah Griffin (born March 10, 1999) is an American former football cornerback. He played college football at USC and was signed by the Buffalo Bills as an undrafted free agent in 2021.

== Early life ==
Griffin played the positions of cornerback and wide receiver while on the Mission Viejo football team. Between 2015 and 2017 during his freshman, sophomore and junior seasons, Griffin and the team earned numerous regional, state and All-American accolades. In his senior season in 2017, Griffin earned personal distinctions including the Los Angeles Times' All-Area Back of the Year award and the All-South Coast League MVP award.

== College career ==
As a freshman cornerback during the 2018 season with the USC Trojans, Griffin only played 8 games before suffering a season-ending shoulder injury in the game against Colorado. After surgery, Griffin joined the 2019 spring practice in a limited capacity while he continued recovery. He went on to start 10 of the 11 games during the 2019 season. However, Griffin injured his back during the game against Utah. This injury caused him to miss the Trojans' game against Washington. Griffin was cleared to play again, only to reinjure his back during the game against Notre Dame. Griffin returned in his junior year for the 2020 season where he started in 5 of the total 6 games played prior to the COVID-19 pandemic. During his sophomore and junior seasons, Griffin earned All-Pac-12 honorable mentions. While at USC, Griffin majored in communication.

Griffin only played three seasons of college football as he declared for the 2021 NFL Draft along with junior season teammates Alijah Vera-Tucker and Talanoa Hufanga.

== Professional career ==
Pre-draft measurables
Height	Weight	Arm length	Hand span	40-yard dash	10-yard split	20-yard split	20-yard shuttle	Three-cone drill	Vertical jump	Broad jump
5 ft 11 in (1.80 m)	176 lb (80 kg)	31 7/8 in (0.81 m)	8 3/4 in (0.22 m)	4.57 s	1.59 s	2.66 s	4.38 s	7.04 s	34.0 in (0.86 m)	9 ft 11 in (3.02 m)
All values from Pro Day

=== Buffalo Bills ===
After going unselected in the 2021 NFL draft, Griffin was signed by the Buffalo Bills as an undrafted free agent. He was released at the final roster cuts but re-signed to the practice squad the next day, where he spent the rest of the 2021 season. He was signed to a two-year futures contract on January 24, 2022. He was waived on August 14, 2022.

=== New York Giants ===
On August 15, 2022, Griffin was claimed off waivers by the New York Giants. He was waived on August 29, 2022. The Giants re-signed Griffin to their practice squad on September 28. He was released on November 8, 2022.

=== Seattle Sea Dragons ===
On April 13, 2023, Grffin signed with the Seattle Sea Dragons of the XFL. The Sea Dragons folded when the XFL and USFL merged to create the United Football League (UFL).

== Personal life ==
Griffin is the son of rapper Warren G and step-nephew of rapper and producer Dr. Dre.
