= 2020 Washington Huskies football team =

American college football season

2020 Washington Huskies football

Pac-12 North Division champion
- Conference: Pac-12 Conference
- North Division
- Record: 3–1 (3–1 Pac-12)
- Head coach: Jimmy Lake (1st season)
- Offensive coordinator: John Donovan (1st season)
- Offensive scheme: Multiple
- Defensive coordinator: Pete Kwiatkowski (7th season)
- Co-defensive coordinator: Ikaika Malloe (1st season)
- Base defense: 4–2–5
- Home stadium: Husky Stadium

2020 Pac-12 Conference football standings
	Conf.			Overall
Team	W		L	W		L
North Division
Washington x	3	–	1	3	–	1
Oregon y$	3	–	2	4	–	3
Stanford	4	–	2	4	–	2
California	1	–	3	1	–	3
Washington State	1	–	3	1	–	3
Oregon State	2	–	5	2	–	5
South Division
No. 21 USC xy	5	–	0	5	–	1
Colorado	3	–	1	4	–	2
Utah	3	–	2	3	–	2
Arizona State	2	–	2	2	–	2
UCLA	3	–	4	3	–	4
Arizona	0	–	5	0	–	5
Championship: Oregon 31, USC 24
$ – Conference champion; x – Division champion/co-champions; y – Championship game participant; Note: Due to COVID-19, the Pac-12 suspended the season on August 11, but later decided to begin play on November 6. In addition to the title game on December 18, the conference seeded all remaining teams for a game during that weekend.; Rankings from AP Poll.

The 2020 Washington Huskies football team represented the University of Washington during the 2020 NCAA Division I FBS football season. The team was led by first-year head coach Jimmy Lake. The Huskies played their home games at Husky Stadium in Seattle, Washington, and competed in the North Division of the Pac-12 Conference.

On August 11, 2020, the Pac-12 canceled all fall sports competitions due to the COVID-19 pandemic. On September 24, the Pac-12 announced that football teams would return to play a seven-game conference-only season beginning on November 6, with the conference championship game scheduled for December 18.

The Huskies finished atop the North Division after canceling their game against Oregon, compiling a 3–1 record. On December 14, the Pac-12 announced that the Huskies would not play in the 2020 Pac-12 Football Championship Game, due to "neither having the minimum 53 scholarship student-athletes available for the game nor the minimum number of scholarship student-athletes at a position group" because of the COVID-19 pandemic. On December 18, the Huskies announced that they would not pursue a bid to a bowl game.

== Offseason ==
=== Position key ===
Back	B	Center	C	Cornerback	CB	Defensive back	DB
Defensive end	DE	Defensive lineman	DL	Defensive tackle	DT	End	E
Fullback	FB	Guard	G	Halfback	HB	Kicker	K
Kickoff returner	KR	Offensive tackle	OT	Offensive lineman	OL	Linebacker	LB
Long snapper	LS	Punter	P	Punt returner	PR	Quarterback	QB
Running back	RB	Safety	S	Tight end	TE	Wide receiver	WR

== Preseason ==
=== Pac-12 media days ===
The Preseason Media poll will be released prior to the start of the regular season.

=== Preseason All-Pac-12 teams ===
First team

Position	Player	Class
First Team Offense
OL	Jaxson Kirkland	Jr.
First Team Defense
DB	Elijah Molden	Sr.

Second team

Position	Player	Class
Second Team Offense
TE	Cade Otton	Jr.
Second Team Defense
LB	Ryan Bowman	Sr.
Second Team Special Teams
PK	Peyton Henry	Jr.

== Personnel ==
=== Coaching staff ===
Name	Position	Alma mater
Junior Adams	Wide receivers coach	Montana State (2004)
Keith Bhonapha	Running backs coach	Hawai'i (2003)
Terrence Brown	Assistant defensive backs coach	Stanford (2013)
Derham Cato	Tight ends coach	Dartmouth (2010)
John Donovan	Offensive coordinator/quarterbacks coach	Johns Hopkins (1996)
Bob Gregory	Special teams coordinator/inside linebackers coach	Washington State (1987)
Will Harris	Defensive backs coach	USC (2009)
Scott Huff	Offensive line coach	Boise State (2002)
Pete Kwiatkowski	Defensive coordinator/Outside linebackers coach	Boise State (1990)
Ikaika Malloe	Co-defensive coordinator/defensive line coach	Washington (1997)
Tim Socha	Head strength and conditioning coach	Minnesota (1999)
Aaron Knotts	Chief of staff	Miami (OH) (1999)

=== Roster ===
2020 Washington Huskies football roster
Quarterback: 3 Jacob Sirmon – sophomore (6'5, 240); 7 Kevin Thomson – graduate student (6'2, 200); 9 Dylan Morris – (redshirt) freshman (6'0, 200); 10 Ethan Garbers – freshman (6'3, 215); 13 Jesse Martineau – sophomore (6'1, 205); 14 Jack Stewardson – freshman (6'1, 205); 15 Jaden Sheffey – junior (6'1, 190); Tailback: 5 Sean McGrew – senior (5'7, 175); 6 Richard Newton – sophomore (6'0, 210); 22 Cameron Davis – (redshirt) freshman (6'0, 205); 24 Kamari Pleasant – senior (6'0, 230); 26 Jay'veon Sunday – freshman (5'11, 200); 27 Javon Forward – freshman (6'0, 225); 28 Sam Adams II – freshman (6'1, 190); 34 Capassio Cherry – sophomore (5'10, 195); 35 Christian Galvan – freshman (5'7, 190); 46 Junior Faualo – freshman (5'11, 250); Wide receiver: 4 Terrell Bynum – junior (6'1, 190); 8 Marquis Spiker – sophomore (6'3, 200); 11 Jalen McMillan – freshman (6'1, 185); 12 Puka Nacua – sophomore (6'1, 210); 16 Rome Odunze – freshman (6'3, 205); 18 Austin Osborne – sophomore (6'2, 200); 19 Sawyer Racanelli – freshman (6'2, 210); 30 David Pritchard – sophomore (6'0, 175); 38 Camden Verstrate – (redshirt) freshman (5'9, 165); 82 Jordan Chin – senior (6'0, 170); 85 Fatu Sua-Godinet – senior (5'11, 180); 88 Ty Jones – junior (6'4, 200); Tight end: 37 Jack Westover – sophomore (6'3, 245); 39 Zeke Pelluer – (redshirt) freshman (6'4, 255); 42 Carson Smith – (redshirt) freshman (6'4, 250); 80 Mason West – freshman (6'4, 225); 81 Mark Redman – freshman (6'6, 245); 83 Devin Culp – sophomore (6'3, 245); 84 Jack Yary – freshman (6'6, 250); 87 Cade Otton – junior (6'5, 240)	Offensive line: 50 Myles Murao – freshman (6'2, 330); 51 Jaxson Kirkland – junior (6'7, 295); 55 Troy Fautanu – (redshirt) freshman (6'4, 315); 56 Geirean Hatchett – freshman (6'4, 295); 62 Noah Hellyer – sophomore (6'1, 295); 64 Gaard Memmelaar – freshman (6'4, 295); 65 Samuel Peacock – freshman (6'6, 270); 66 Henry Bainivalu – junior (6'6, 335); 67 Chase Skuza – junior (6'6, 300); 68 Ulumoo Ale – sophomore (6'6, 355); 69 Will Pliska – sophomore (6'5, 290); 71 Nate Kalepo – (redshirt) freshman (6'6, 330); 72 Roger Rosengarten – freshman (6'6, 280); 73 Gage Harty – sophomore (6'4, 275); 74 Corey Luciano – junior (6'4, 295); 75 Logan Bruce-Jones – freshman (6'2, 320); 76 Luke Wattenberg – senior (6'5, 300); 77 Julius Buelow – (redshirt) freshman (6'8, 325); 78 Matteo Mele – sophomore (6'5, 300); 79 Victor Curne – sophomore (6'3, 330); Defensive line: 11 Josiah Bronson – senior (6'3, 300); 59 Draco Bynum – sophomore (6'4, 270); 91 Tuli Letuligasenoa – sophomore (6'2, 305); 92 Noa Ngalu – (redshirt) freshman (6'1, 290); 94 Sam Taimani – sophomore (6'2, 335); 96 Jacob Bandes – (redshirt) freshman (6'2, 315); 97 Bradley McGannon – freshman (6'4, 270); 99 Faatui Tuitele – (redshirt) freshman (6'3, 305); Long snapper: 89 Jaden Green – freshman (5'10, 205); Placekicker: 37 Tim Horn – sophomore (6'2, 205); 47 Peyton Henry – junior (5'11, 195); 85 Addison Shrock – freshman (6'1, 165); Punter: 32 Triston Brown – sophomore (6'1, 195); 46 Race Porter – senior (6'2, 190)	Inside linebacker: 10 Miki Ah You – (redshirt) freshman (6'1, 210); 14 Josh Calvert – (redshirt) freshman (6'2, 235); 15 Daniel Heimuli – (redshirt) freshman (6'0, 215); 35 Ben Hines – sophomore (5'10, 225); 40 Alphonzo Tuputala – (redshirt) freshman (6'2, 225); 41 Cooper McDonald – freshman (6'2, 235); 42 Carson Bruener – freshman (6'2, 215); 43 Jackson Sirmon – sophomore (6'3, 230); 48 Edefuan Ulofoshio – sophomore (6'0, 230); 53 M.J. Tafisi – sophomore (6'0, 230); 54 Drew Fowler – (redshirt) freshman (6'0, 225); 56 Ruperake Fuavai – (redshirt) freshman (6'0, 215); 57 Anthony Ward – freshman (6'0, 215); Outside linebacker: 13 Laiatu Latu – sophomore (6'4, 265); 17 Sav'ell Smalls – freshman (6'2, 250); 45 Bralen Trice – (redshirt) freshman (6'3, 240); 51 Jordan Lolohea – freshman (6'2, 270); 55 Ryan Bowman – senior (6'0, 280); 58 Zion Tupuola-Fetui – sophomore (6'3, 280); Defensive back: 2 Kyler Gordon – sophomore (6'0, 195); 3 Elijah Molden – senior (5'10, 190); 5 Alex Cook – junior (6'1, 200); 6 Cameron Williams – sophomore (6'0, 190); 8 Keith Taylor – senior (6'3, 195); 12 Jacobe Covington – freshman (6'2, 195); 20 Asa Turner – sophomore (6'3, 200); 21 Dominique Hampton – sophomore (6'2, 220); 22 Trent McDuffie – sophomore (5'11, 195); 23 Brandon McKinney – senior (6'0, 208); 24 Makell Esteen – freshman (6'1, 180); 25 Elijah Jackson – freshman (6'1, 185); 26 Meki Pei – freshman (5'11, 175); 27 James Smith – freshman (6'1, 190); 29 Julius Irvin – sophomore (6'1, 185); 31 Kamren Fabiculanan – (redshirt) freshman (6'1, 185); 34 Mishael Powell – (redshirt) freshman (6'1, 205); 36 Kasen Kinchen – freshman (5'10, 180); 38 Zechariah Brown – junior (5'10, 205); 39 Nick Juran – (redshirt) freshman (6'0, 195)

As of November 2, 2020

== Schedule ==
=== Regular season ===
Washington's 2020 regular season was announced on January 16. The Huskies had a game scheduled against Michigan on September 5, which was later canceled before the start of the 2020 season. The Huskies canceled their other two non-conference games, scheduled against Sacramento State and Utah State, shortly thereafter due to the Pac-12 Conference's decision to play a conference-only schedule due to the COVID-19 pandemic. The seven game Conference only schedule was announced October 3, 2020.

On November 22, Washington's scheduled game at Washington State for November 27 was canceled after a COVID-19 outbreak within the Washington State program. Two days later, the Pac-12 announced that Washington would instead host Utah on November 28; the Utes' scheduled game at Arizona State had also been canceled after Arizona State had a COVID-19 outbreak.

Original 2020 Washington Huskies schedule
Date	Opponent	Site
September 5	Michigan*	Husky Stadium • Seattle, WA
September 12	Sacramento State*	Husky Stadium • Seattle, WA
September 19	Utah State*	Husky Stadium • Seattle, WA
October 3	at Oregon	Autzen Stadium • Eugene, OR (rivalry)
October 10	Oregon State	Husky Stadium • Seattle, WA
October 17	at Utah	Rice–Eccles Stadium • Salt Lake City, UT
October 23	Arizona	Husky Stadium • Seattle, WA
October 31	at California	California Memorial Stadium • Berkeley, CA
November 7	Stanford	Husky Stadium • Seattle, WA
November 14	at USC	Los Angeles Memorial Coliseum • Los Angeles, CA
November 21	Colorado	Husky Stadium • Seattle, WA
November 27	at Washington State	Martin Stadium • Pullman, WA (Apple Cup)

Date	Time	Opponent	Rank	Site	TV	Result	Attendance	Source
November 7	7:30 p.m.	at California		California Memorial Stadium; Berkeley, CA	ESPN	No contest		
November 14	8:00 p.m.	Oregon State^{†}		Husky Stadium; Seattle, WA	FS1	W 27–21	294	
November 21	5:00 p.m.	Arizona		Husky Stadium; Seattle, WA	FOX	W 44–27	253	
November 28	4:30 p.m.	Utah		Husky Stadium; Seattle, WA	ABC	W 24–21	259	
December 5	1:00 p.m.	Stanford	No. 22	Husky Stadium; Seattle, WA	FOX	L 26–31	278	
December 12	1:00 p.m.	at Oregon		Autzen Stadium; Eugene, OR (rivalry)	FOX	No contest		
December 18	5:00 p.m.	at No. 15 USC		Los Angeles Memorial Coliseum; Los Angeles, CA (Pac-12 Championship Game)	FOX	No contest		
^{†}Homecoming; Rankings from AP Poll and CFP Rankings (after November 24) released prior to game; All times are in Pacific time

== Game summaries ==
=== At California ===
Game canceled due to Cal not having the minimum number of scholarship players available for the game as a result of a positive football student-athlete COVID-19 cases.

Washington at California – Game summary

Quarter	1	2	3	4	Total
Huskies	0	0	0	0	0
Bears	0	0	0	0	0

at California Memorial Stadium • Berkeley, CA

- Date: November 7, 2020
- Game time: 7:30 p.m. PST
- TV: ESPN

Game information

Top passers

- Cal –
- UW –

Top rushers

- Cal –
- UW –

Top receiving

- Cal –
- UW –

=== Oregon State ===
Oregon State at Washington – Game summary

Quarter	1	2	3	4	Total
Beavers	7	14	0	0	21
Huskies	10	14	0	3	27

at Husky Stadium • Seattle, WA

- Date: November 14, 2020
- Game time: 8:00 p.m. PST
- Game weather: 43 °F (6 °C) • Light Rain • Wind @ 8 mph (13 km/h)
- Game attendance: 294 (Limited in-person attendance)
- Referee: Mike McCabe
- TV announcers (FS1): Petros Papadakis and Alex Faust

Game information

First quarter

- OSU – Jaydon Grant 11-yard return of blocked punt (Everett Hayes kick), 9:46. Oregon State 7–0. Drive: 0 plays, 0 yards, 0:00.
- UW – Sean McGrew 21-yard run (Peyton Henry kick), 7:44. Tied 7–7. Drive: 5 plays, 75 yards, 2:02.
- UW – Peyton Henry 25-yard field goal, 2:10. Washington 10–7. Drive: 9 plays, 52 yards, 4:23.

Second quarter

- UW – Kamari Pleasant 15-yard run (Peyton Henry kick), 14:15. Washington 17–7. Drive: 3 plays, 32 yards, 0:58.
- OSU – B. J. Baylor 3-yard run (Everett Hayes kick), 9:31. Washington 17–14. Drive: 11 plays, 80 yards, 4:38.
- UW – Dylan Morris 1-yard run (Peyton Henry kick), 2:19. Washington 24–14. Drive: 8 plays, 15 yards, 3:49.
- OSU – Jermar Jefferson 4-yard run (Everett Hayes kick), 0:18. Washington 24–21. Drive: 9 plays, 56 yards, 1:53.

Third quarter

- No Scoring Plays.

Fourth quarter

- UW – Peyton Henry 23-yard field goal, 1:45. Washington 27–21. Drive: 15 plays, 52 yards, 7:24.

Top passers

- OSU – QB Tristan Gebbia: 11/24, 85 yards, 1 int
- UW – QB Dylan Morris: 14/24, 141 yards

Top rushers

- OSU – RB Jermar Jefferson: 23 carries, 131 yards, 1 TD
- UW – RB Sean McGrew: 9 carries, 91 yards, 1 TD

Top receiving

- OSU – TE Luke Musgrave: 2 receptions, 25 yards (6 targets)
- UW – WR Terrell Bynum: 4 receptions, 66 yards (6 targets)

Defense

- OSU – LB Avery Roberts: 14 tackles

- DT Isaac Hodgins: 7 tackles, 1 assist

- UW – LB Edefuan Ulofoshio: 8 tackles, 1 fumble recovery

- LB Zion Tupuola-Fetui: 4 tackles, 2 sacks, 2 forced fumbles

=== Arizona ===
Arizona at Washington – Game summary

Quarter	1	2	3	4	Total
Wildcats	0	0	0	27	27
Huskies	17	7	13	7	44

at Husky Stadium • Seattle, WA

- Date: November 21, 2020
- Game time: 5:00 p.m. PST
- Game weather: 49 °F (9 °C) • Clear • Wind @ 8 mph (13 km/h)
- Game attendance: 253 (Limited in-person attendance)
- Referee: Francisco Villar
- TV announcers (FOX): Joe Davis and Mark Helfrich

Game information

First quarter

- (11:27) WASH – Puka Nacua 65-yard pass from Dylan Morris, Peyton Henry kick (Drive: 7 plays, 78 yards, 3:33; Washington 7–0)
- (4:58) WASH – Peyton Henry 20-yard field goal (Drive: 10 plays, 77 yards, 5:20; Washington 10–0)
- (2:48) WASH – Sean McGrew 1-yard run, Peyton Henry kick (Drive: 2 plays, 9 yards, 0:43; Washington 17–0)

Second quarter

- (8:49) WASH – Richard Newton 2-yard run, Peyton Henry kick (Drive: 13 plays, 65 yards, 6:39; Washington 24–0)

Third quarter

- (10:31) WASH – Kamari Pleasant 21-yard run, two-point run failed (Drive: 5 plays, 51 yards, 2:35; Washington 30–0)
- (5:02) WASH – Cade Otton 20-yard pass from Dylan Morris, Peyton Henry kick (Drive: 7 plays, 47 yards, 3:11; Washington 37–0)

Fourth quarter

- (12:54) ARIZ – Stanley Berryhill III 30-yard pass from Grant Gunnell, kick failed (Drive: 10 plays, 71 yards, 3:04; Washington 37–6)
- (11:34) WASH – Richard Newton 54-yard run, Peyton Henry kick (Drive: 3 plays, 65 yards, 1:20; Washington 44–6)
- (9:28) ARIZ – Ma'Jon Wright 11-yard pass from Grant Gunnell, Lucas Havrisik kick (Drive: 8 plays, 75 yards, 2:06; Washington 44–13)
- (4:54) ARIZ – Michael Wiley 3-yard run, Lucas Havrisik kick (Drive: 8 plays, 80 yards, 2:14; Washington 44–20)
- (0:33) ARIZ – Stanley Berryhill III 24-yard pass from Grant Gunnell, Lucas Havrisik kick (Drive: 6 plays, 75 yards, 1:56; Washington 44–27)

Top passers

- Az – QB Grant Gunnell: 27/39, 259 yards, 3 TD
- UW – QB Dylan Morris: 15/25, 230 yards, 2 TD

Top rushers

- Az – RB Gary Brightwell: 5 carries, 65 yards, 2 TD
- UW – RB Richard Newton:11 carries, 57 yards

Top receiving

- Az – WR Stanley Berryhill: 5 receptions, 65 yards, 2 TD
- UW – TE Cade Otton: 7 receptions, 100 yards, 1 TD

=== At Washington State ===
Game canceled due to Washington State not having the minimum number of scholarship players available for the game as a result of a positive football student-athlete COVID-19 cases.

Washington at Washington State – Game summary

Quarter	1	2	3	4	Total
Huskies	0	0	0	0	0
Cougars	0	0	0	0	0

at Martin Stadium • Pullman, WA

- Date: November 27, 2020
- Game time: 7:30 p.m. PST
- TV: ESPN

Game information

Top passers

- WSU –
- UW –

Top rushers

- WSU –
- UW –

Top receiving

- WSU –
- UW –

=== Utah ===
Due to Arizona State not having the minimum number of scholarship players available due to positive COVID-19 tests Utah was rescheduled to play at Washington. Trailing 21–0 at halftime, Washington scored 24 unanswered points for the eventual 24–21 victory. It has been Washington's largest come-from-behind win since a 1988 game against California.

Utah at Washington – Game summary

Quarter	1	2	3	4	Total
Utes	7	14	0	0	21
Huskies	0	0	17	7	24

at Husky Stadium • Seattle, WA

- Date: November 28, 2020
- Game time: 4:30 p.m. PST
- Game weather: 47 °F (8 °C) • Mostly Cloudy• Wind @ 0 mph (0 km/h)
- Game attendance: 259
- Referee: Mark Duddy
- TV announcers (ABC): Beth Mowins, Kirk Morrison, and Stormy Buonantony

Game information

Top passers

- Utah – QB Jake Bentley: 16/23, 144 yards, 1 TD, 2 int
- UW – QB Dylan Morris: 23/38, 272 yards, 2 TD, 3 int

Top rushers

- Utah – RB Ty Jordan: 10 carries, 99 yards
- UW – RB Sean McGrew: 7 carries, 38 yards

Top receiving

- Utah – WR Bryan Thompson: 3 receptions, 65 yards, 1 TD
- UW – TE Cade Otton: 8 receptions, 108 yards, 2 TD

=== Stanford ===
Stanford at Washington – Game summary

Quarter	1	2	3	4	Total
Cardinal	14	10	7	0	31
No. 22 Huskies	0	3	13	10	26

at Husky Stadium • Seattle, WA

- Date: December 5, 2020
- Game time: 1:00 p.m. PST
- Game weather: Sunny, 55 °F (13 °C)
- Game attendance: 278
- Referee: Michael Mothershed
- TV announcers (FOX): Joe Davis and Mark Helfrich

Game information

First quarter

- STAN – Austin Jones 3-yard run (Jet Toner kick), 9:53. Stanford 7–0. Drive: 11 plays, 65 yards, 5:07.
- STAN – Austin Jones 1-yard run (Jet Toner kick), 2:05. Stanford 14–0. Drive: 9 plays, 80 yards, 4:34.

Second quarter

- UW – Peyton Henry 23-yard field goal, 11:59. Stanford 14–3. Drive: 13 plays, 71 yards, 5:06.
- STAN – Nathaniel Peat 3-yard run (Jet Toner kick), 6:54. Stanford 21–3. Drive: 9 plays, 64 yards, 5:05.
- STAN – Jet Toner 42-yard field goal, 0:00. Stanford 24–3. Drive: 14 plays, 61 yards, 3:09.

Third quarter

- UW – Sean McGrew 6-yard run (Peyton Henry kick), 12:20. Stanford 24–10. Drive: 7 plays, 75 yards, 2:40.
- STAN – Scooter Harrington 3-yard pass from Davis Mills (Jet Toner kick), 9:01. Stanford 31–10. Drive: 7 plays, 69 yards, 3:19.
- UW – Dylan Morris 1-yard run (kick blocked), 2:33. Stanford 31–16. Drive: 12 plays, 75 yards, 6:28.

Fourth quarter

- UW – Sean McGrew 2-yard run (Peyton Henry kick), 11:03. Stanford 31–23. Drive: 9 plays, 92 yards, 4:11.
- UW – Peyton Henry 45-yard field goal, 7:54. Stanford 31–26. Drive: 4 plays, -17 yards, 2:11.

Top passers

- STAN – Davis Mills – 20/30, 252 yards, TD
- UW – Dylan Morris – 15/23, 254 yards

Top rushers

- STAN – Austin Jones – 31 rushes, 138 yards, 2 TD
- UW – Sean McGrew – 16 rushes, 65 yards, 2 TD

Top receivers

- STAN – Simi Fehoko – 4 receptions, 61 yards
- UW – Ty Jones – 2 receptions, 79 yards

=== At Oregon ===
Game canceled due to UW not having the minimum number of scholarship players available for the game as a result of a positive football student-athlete COVID-19 cases.

Washington at Oregon – Game summary

Quarter	1	2	3	4	Total
Huskies	0	0	0	0	0
Ducks	0	0	0	0	0

at Autzen Stadium • Eugene, OR

- Date: December 12, 2020
- Game time: 1:00 p.m. PST
- TV: FOX

Game information

Top passers

- UO –
- UW –

Top rushers

- UO –
- UW –

Top receiving

- UO –
- UW –

=== Pac-12 Championship Game at USC ===
Game canceled due to Washington not having the minimum number of scholarship players available for the game as a result of a positive football student-athlete COVID-19 cases. Oregon played in the championship game since they had more conference wins.

Washington at USC – Game summary

Quarter	1	2	Total
Huskies			0
No. 13 Trojans			0

at Los Angeles Memorial Coliseum • Los Angeles, CA

- Date: December 18, 2020
- Game time: 5:00 p.m. PST
- TV: FOX

Game information

Top passers

- USC –
- UW –

Top rushers

- USC –
- UW –

Top receiving

- USC –
- UW –

== Rankings ==
Ranking movements Legend: ██ Increase in ranking ██ Decrease in ranking — = Not ranked RV = Received votes
	Week																	
Poll	Pre	1	2	3	4	5	6	7	8	9	10	11	12	13	14	15	16	Final
AP	RV	—	—	—	RV	RV	RV	RV	RV	RV	RV	RV	RV	23	RV	RV	RV	RV
Coaches	RV	—	—	—	—	RV	RV	RV	—	—	—	RV	RV	23	RV	RV	RV	RV
CFP	Not released												—	22	—	—	—	Not released

== Awards and honors ==
=== Pac-12 Player of the Week ===
Week	Player	Opponent	Position	Ref
2	Zion Tupuola-Fetui	Oregon State	Defensive line	
3	Luke Wattenberg	Arizona	Offensive line	
3	Zion Tupuola-Fetui	Arizona	Defensive line	
3	Dylan Morris	Arizona	Freshman	
4	Zion Tupuola-Fetui	Utah	Defensive line	
4	Dylan Morris	Utah	Freshman	

=== Athlon Sports National Player of the Week ===
Week	Player	Opponent	Position	Ref
13	Zion Tupuola-Fetui	Utah	Defensive Player	

== Players drafted into the NFL ==
Round	Pick	Player	Position	NFL club
1	32	Joe Tryon-Shoyinka	OLB	Tampa Bay Buccaneers
2	41	Levi Onwuzurike	DT	Detroit Lions
3	100	Elijah Molden	CB	Tennessee Titans
5	166	Keith Taylor	CB	Carolina Panthers
