= Kedon Slovis =

American football player (born 2001)

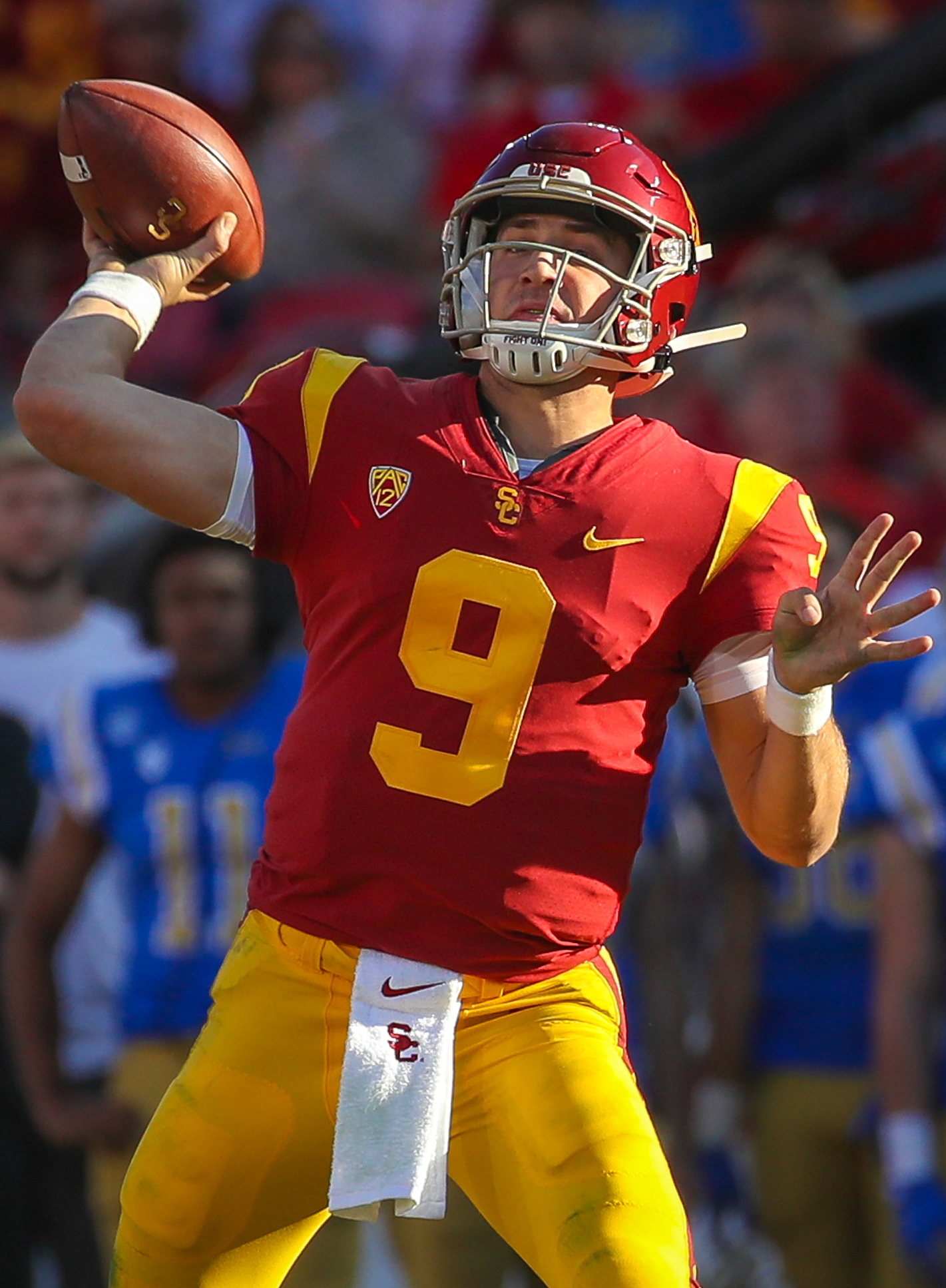
- Slovis with USC in 2019

No. 18 – Baltimore Ravens
- Position: Quarterback
- Roster status: Active

Personal information
- Born: April 11, 2001 (age 25); Scottsdale, Arizona, U.S.
- Listed height: 6 ft 2 in (1.88 m)
- Listed weight: 223 lb (101 kg)

Career information
- High school: Desert Mountain (Scottsdale, Arizona)
- College: USC (2019–2021); Pittsburgh (2022); BYU (2023)
- NFL draft: 2024: undrafted

Career history
- Indianapolis Colts (2024)*; Houston Texans (2024–2025)*; Arizona Cardinals (2025); Green Bay Packers (2026)*; Baltimore Ravens (2026–present)
- * Offseason or practice squad member only

Awards and highlights
- First-team All-Pac-12 (2020); Pac-12 Freshman of the Year (2019)

Career NFL statistics as of Week 8, 2026
- Passing attempts: 2
- Passing completions: 1
- Completion percentage: 50.0%
- TD–INT: 0–0
- Passing yards: -2
- Passer rating: 56.2
- Stats at Pro Football Reference

Kedon Slovis (born April 11, 2001) is an American professional football quarterback for the Baltimore Ravens of the National Football League (NFL). He played college football for the USC Trojans, Pittsburgh Panthers, and BYU Cougars.

== Early life ==
Slovis attended Desert Mountain High School in Scottsdale, Arizona. During his two years playing varsity high school football, he passed for 5,549 yards with 50 touchdowns and only 11 interceptions. His high school quarterback coach was Pro Football Hall of Famer Kurt Warner. In his senior year of high school, he received offers from 12 colleges, with Northern Arizona University being the only in-state university, before committing to USC in 2018. USC had been one of the only teams from one of the Power Five conferences to show interest in Slovis, which happened shortly after USC quarterbacks coach Bryan Ellis visited the high school. Arizona State offensive coordinator Rob Likens had also shown interest in Slovis, but was unable to recruit him before he committed to the Trojans. Slovis graduated from his high school a semester early and enrolled at the University of Southern California in January 2019.

== College career ==
=== USC ===
==== 2019 ====
Slovis entered the 2019 season as the second quarterback in the depth chart, behind then-starting quarterback JT Daniels. Slovis made his first collegiate appearance in the Trojans' season opener against the Fresno State Bulldogs, after Daniels suffered a season-ending knee injury. Slovis would go on to make his first start next week, where he set the school record for quarterback touchdowns in a 45–20 victory over the 23rd ranked Stanford Cardinal. For his efforts, Slovis was named the Pac-12 Freshman of the Week. The next week, Slovis started in an away game against the BYU Cougars, where he would throw three interceptions in a 30–27 loss in overtime. Slovis would next start in a home game against the 10th ranked Utah Utes, where he left the game early in the first quarter after suffering a possible head injury. Backup quarterback Matt Fink would proceed to lead the Trojans to a 30–23 upset victory. Following the incident, Slovis was placed in the concussion protocol and ruled out for the next game, an away game against the Washington Huskies, leaving Fink to start. Slovis would return to the starting position for the next game, a narrow loss at the 9th ranked Notre Dame Fighting Irish. Rebounding from that loss, Slovis would lead the Trojans to two straight wins, a blowout against the Arizona Wildcats and a come from behind victory in USC's first away game win of the season against the Colorado Buffaloes. For his performance in the Colorado victory, Slovis was awarded his second Pac-12 Freshman of the Week Award. Following a 56–24 blowout loss to the Oregon Ducks, where Slovis set the USC record for most pass attempts in a game, Slovis would return to his native Arizona where he set another school record with 292 passing yards and 4 touchdowns in the first quarter of a 31–26 victory against the Arizona State Sun Devils. For his performance, Slovis was awarded the Pac-12 Player of the Week Award, while freshman Kenan Christon was named the Pac-12 Freshman of the Week. The following week, Slovis led the Trojans to a 41–17 blowout of the California Golden Bears going 29/35 for 406 yards, 4 touchdowns and zero interceptions. In the final game of the regular season, Slovis broke another USC record throwing for single game passing yards, throwing for 515 yards and 4 touchdowns (the previous record of 493 yards was set by Matt Barkley in 2012) in a 52–35 win over the UCLA Bruins. It was his fourth game of at least 400 yards passing, setting yet another school record. During the 2019 Holiday Bowl, with USC down 28–24 and with Iowa's sack leader A. J. Epenesa continuing to beat USC's offensive line, Slovis suffered an elbow strain in the second quarter after getting sacked by Epenesa. He was replaced by Fink and USC would lose to the Iowa Hawkeyes 49–24.

Slovis finished the 2019 season with a freshman record 3,502 yards, 30 touchdowns to only 9 interceptions and an NCAA Freshman record 71.8 completion percentage, while leading USC to an 8–4 regular season record and a Holiday Bowl berth en route to being named the Pac-12 Freshman of the Year.

==== 2020 ====
Following the 2019 season, multiple sources pegged Slovis as a possible contender for the Heisman Trophy in 2020. On July 14, 2020, he was named to the Davey O'Brien Award Watch List alongside other notable quarterbacks, including 2020 Heisman Trophy favorites Trevor Lawrence and Justin Fields. In light of the COVID-19 pandemic, the 2020 Pac-12 Conference football season was indefinitely suspended. In September, Slovis sent an open letter alongside several other USC players convincing Governor of California Gavin Newsom to loosen restrictions related to the pandemic to possibly allow for a 2020 season.

In week one of the 2020 season, against the Arizona State Sun Devils, Slovis set a USC record of 40 completions as he threw for 380 yards and 2 touchdowns in a 28–27 comeback victory. For his efforts he received Davey O'Brien Award "Great 8", Manning Award Star of the Week and CollegeSportsMadness.com Pac-12 Offensive Player of the Week honors. The following week, the Trojans traveled to Tucson to play the Arizona Wildcats, where Slovis led another 4th quarter comeback, throwing for 325 yards and 1 touchdown in the 34–30 victory. In Week 3, Slovis threw for 264 yards, 2 touchdowns and 1 interception en route to defeating the Utah Utes in Salt Lake City, for the first time since 2012, and improving USC's record to 3–0. Following the cancellation of their Week 4 matchup against the Colorado Buffaloes due to COVID-19, Slovis led USC to a 38–13 victory over the Washington State Cougars, throwing for 287 yards and 5 touchdowns (4 of which were to Amon-Ra St. Brown).

In the final week of the regular season, Slovis helped rally the Trojans from an 18-point deficit by throwing for 344 yards and 5 touchdowns (including the game winner to St. Brown with under a minute left) in a 43–38 victory over their crosstown rivals, the UCLA Bruins. For his efforts in the Battle for the Victory Bell, he was named Pac-12 Offensive Player of the Week and CollegeSportsMadness.com Pac-12 Offensive Player of the Week. USC finished the regular season at 5–0 (for the first time since 2006), claimed the Pac-12 South Title and advanced to the Pac-12 Championship Game.

In the 2020 Pac-12 Football Championship Game, USC suffered its only loss of the season to the defending Pac-12 Champion Oregon Ducks, 31–24. In a game marred by USC penalties, inconsistencies, turnovers and lack of running game, Slovis went 28/52 for 320 yards with two touchdowns and three interceptions (with his third being picked off in the 4th quarter as he attempted to throw the ball out of bounds). On the final play of the game, Slovis would suffer a season ending shoulder injury.

On December 19, USC announced that it would be opting out of their Bowl Game. The team would finish the season as the Pac-12 South Champions with a 5–1 record and ranked #17 in NCAA. Slovis would lead all Pac-12 starting quarterbacks in wins (5), passing yards (1,921), passing yards per game (320.2), completions (177), attempts (264), completion percentage (67.0%) and touchdowns (17) but also lead the league in interceptions (7) and sacks (15). For his play over the season, Slovis was named to the first team All-Pac-12 Team as voted by Pac-12 coaches, first team All-Pac-12 as voted by the Associated Press and third team All-Pac-12 by Pro Football Focus.

==== 2021 ====
In order to improve his mechanics, during the 2021 offseason Slovis began working with QB mechanics coaches Jordan Palmer and Tom House, who have worked with several NFL quarterbacks. Despite this, Slovis struggled in his junior and final season at USC, finishing with 2,153 passing yards, 11 touchdowns and 8 interceptions with a 132.7 quarterback rating as the Trojans would finish with a 4–8 record in 2021. On December 13, 2021, Slovis entered the NCAA transfer portal.

=== Pittsburgh ===
On December 21, 2021, Slovis announced he would transfer to Pittsburgh. On August 24, 2022, Slovis was named the starter for the Panthers' week 1 game against the West Virginia Mountaineers.

In the Backyard Brawl, Slovis threw for 308 yards and a touchdown in his debut for the Panthers in a 38–31 win. The next week, he threw for 195 yards with a touchdown and an interception, before sustaining an injury that kept him in for the second-half, as the Panthers lost in overtime to the 24th ranked Tennessee Volunteers. He and backup quarterback Nick Patti missed the game against the Western Michigan Broncos due to injury, which saw third-string redshirt freshman Nate Yarnell start in their absence. Slovis returned to the team in a 45–24 win over the 20th ranked FCS team Rhode Island Rams, and went 20/27 for 189 yards. Against the Georgia Tech Yellow Jackets, Slovis threw three touchdowns and an interception in a 26–21 loss. Slovis then went on a dismal run in the next four games, failing to record a touchdown, in addition to being intercepted four times. The Panthers ended their regular season with wins over the Virginia Cavaliers, the Duke Blue Devils and Miami Hurricanes, which saw Slovis throwing five touchdowns as well as three interceptions.

On December 5, 2022, Slovis announced he would again enter the transfer portal as a graduate transfer.

=== BYU ===
On December 24, 2022, Slovis announced he would transfer to BYU for his last year of eligibility and the school's inaugural season in the Big 12 Conference. During an interview on BYU Sports Nation later that month, Slovis said he would wear jersey #10 as a Cougar.

He made his debut for the Cougars in a 14–0 win over Sam Houston Bearkats, with two rushing touchdowns. The next week, he threw four touchdowns and scored another rushing touchdown in a 41–17 win over the Southern Utah Thunderbirds. Against the Arkansas Razorbacks, he led the Cougars on two second-half touchdown drives in a 38–31 win. He then threw two touchdowns and two interceptions, with one resulting in a pick-six, in a 38–27 loss to the Kansas Jayhawks. In his next three games, he threw four touchdowns and had one interception, as the Cougars went 5–2 on the season. After a 35–6 loss to the Texas Longhorns, Slovis was unable to start against the West Virginia Mountaineers, as he struggled with shoulder and elbow injuries to his throwing arm. Although named as an emergency quarterback against West Virginia, the Texas game proved to be his final appearance for the Cougars, and Jake Retzlaff took over for the rest of the season.

=== Statistics ===
Season	Team	Games		Passing								
Season	Team	GP	GS	Record	Cmp	Att	Pct	Yds	Avg	TD	Int	Rtg
2019	USC	12	11	7–4	282	392	71.9	3,502	8.9	30	9	167.6
2020	USC	6	6	5–1	177	264	67.0	1,921	7.4	17	7	144.1
2021	USC	9	9	4–5	193	297	65.0	2,153	7.2	11	8	132.7
2022	Pittsburgh	11	11	7–4	184	315	58.4	2,397	7.6	10	9	127.1
2023	BYU	8	8	5–3	153	266	57.5	1,716	6.5	12	6	122.1
Career		43	42	28–17	989	1,534	64.5	11,689	7.6	80	39	140.6

== Professional career ==
Pre-draft measurables
Height	Weight	Arm length	Hand span	Wingspan	40-yard dash	10-yard split	20-yard split	Vertical jump	Broad jump
6 ft 2 1/2 in (1.89 m)	223 lb (101 kg)	31 1/8 in (0.79 m)	9 7/8 in (0.25 m)	6 ft 2 3/8 in (1.89 m)	4.55 s	1.58 s	2.65 s	30.0 in (0.76 m)	9 ft 10 in (3.00 m)
All values from NFL Combine

=== Indianapolis Colts ===
On April 28, 2024, Slovis signed with the Indianapolis Colts as an undrafted free agent after he was not selected in the 2024 NFL draft. He was waived on August 25 as part of final roster cuts before the start of the 2024 season.

=== Houston Texans ===
On August 29, 2024, Slovis signed with the practice squad of the Houston Texans. He signed a reserve/future contract with Houston on January 21, 2025. On August 26, Slovis was waived by the Texans as part of final roster cuts.

=== Arizona Cardinals ===
On August 28, 2025, Slovis signed with the Arizona Cardinals' practice squad. He was promoted to the team's active roster on October 11, amidst Kyler Murray dealing with a foot injury. Slovis made his NFL debut on November 9, against the Seattle Seahawks. He replaced Jacoby Brissett for two plays against the Jacksonville Jaguars, throwing one completion for −2 yards.

Slovis was waived by the Cardinals as a part of final roster cuts on August 30, 2026.

=== Green Bay Packers ===
Slovis was signed to the Green Bay Packers' practice squad on September 1, 2026.

=== Baltimore Ravens ===
On November 3, 2026, Slovis was signed off the Green Bay Packers practice squad by the Baltimore Ravens. The move came after Ravens quarterbacks Lamar Jackson and Tyler Huntley suffered significant injuries that required them to be placed on injured reserve. After the Ravens traded for Jacoby Brissett, Slovis was named the third string quarterback behind Joe Fagnano.

== NFL career statistics ==
Year	Team	Games			Passing									Rushing					Sacks		Fumbles	
Year	Team	GP	GS	Record	Cmp	Att	Pct	Yds	Y/A	Lng	TD	Int	Rtg	Att	Yds	Y/A	Lng	TD	Sck	Yds	Fum	Lost
2025	ARI	2	0	—	1	2	50.0	−2	−1.0	−2	0	0	56.2	0	0	—	0	0	0	0	0	0
2026	BAL	0	0	—	0	0	0.0	0	0.0	0	0	0	0.0	0	0	—	0	0	0	0	0	0
Career		2	0	—	1	2	50.0	-2	-1.0	-2	0	0	56.2	0	0	—	0	0	0	0	0	0
