= John Jackson (wide receiver) =

American sports commentator (born 1967)

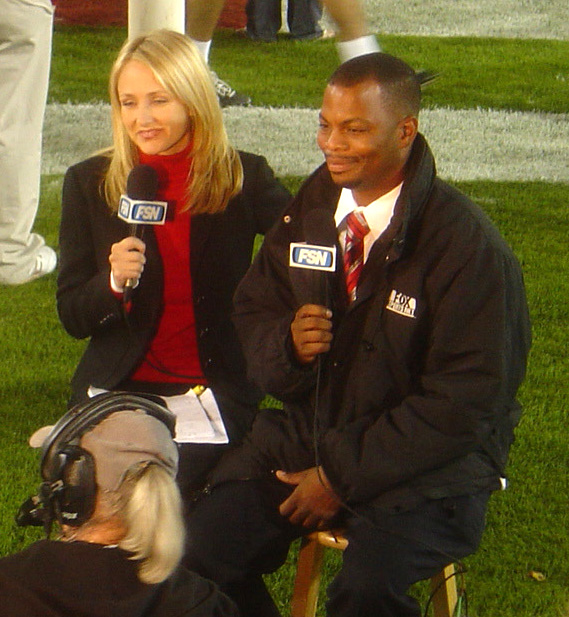
- Jackson doing sideline reporting at a USC game

Profile
- Position: Wide receiver

Personal information
- Born: January 2, 1967 (age 59); Brooklyn, New York, U.S.
- Listed height: 5 ft 10 in (1.78 m)
- Listed weight: 170 lb (77 kg)

Career information
- High school: Bishop Amat Memorial (La Puente, California)
- College: Southern California
- NFL draft: 1990: undrafted

Career history
- 1990–1992: Phoenix Cardinals
- 1996: Los Angeles Rams*
- 1996: New Orleans Saints*
- 1996: Chicago Bears
- * Offseason or practice squad member only
- Stats at Pro Football Reference

John Jackson Jr. (born January 2, 1967) is an American sports commentator who works for ESPN Radio 710 and FSN West and formerly played professional American football. "JJ," as he is referenced by his on-air colleagues, co-hosts the Lexus Gauntlet Show and the USC Press Conference Show, and serves as an analyst for Trojans Live. He serves as a sideline reporter during USC football games for 710 ESPN.

== High school and college ==
Jackson prepped at Bishop Amat Memorial High School in La Puente, California.

Jackson was an athletic and academic All-American at the University of Southern California and also played baseball. He was team MVP in 1989.

== Professional career ==
Jackson played wide receiver for the National Football League Phoenix Cardinals between 1990 and 1992 and for the Chicago Bears in 1996.

He also played in Minor League Baseball from 1990 to 1995 with the San Francisco Giants, California Angels and Minnesota Twins organizations.

== Personal life ==
Jackson is the father of former Chicago Bears wide receiver John Jackson III.
