= John Jackson (wide receiver, born 1999) =

American football player (born 1999)

Profile
- Position: Wide receiver

Personal information
- Born: August 23, 1999 (age 27); Redondo Beach, California, U.S.
- Listed height: 6 ft 0 in (1.83 m)
- Listed weight: 213 lb (97 kg)

Career information
- High school: Junípero Serra (Gardena, California)
- College: USC (2019–2022); Nevada (2023)
- NFL draft: 2024: undrafted

Career history
- Chicago Bears (2024)*
- * Offseason or practice squad member only
- Stats at Pro Football Reference

John Jackson III (born August 23, 1999) is an American professional football wide receiver. He played college football for the Nevada Wolfpack and for the USC Trojans.

== Early life ==
Jackson, the son of former NFL wide receiver John Jackson, grew up in Redondo Beach, California and attended Mater Dei High School in Santa Ana, California before transferring to Junípero Serra High School in Gardena, California during his junior year. Coming out of preschool, Jackson decided to commit to play college football for the USC Trojans.

== College career ==
=== USC ===
In Jackson's first two collegiate seasons in 2019 and 2020, he played in 17 games, making just one catch for 23 yards. During the 2021 season, Jackson recorded three receptions for 16 yards. In the 2022 season, Jackson played in all 13 games for USC where he caught just one pass for three yards. After the conclusion of the 2022 season, Jackson decided to enter his name into the NCAA transfer portal.

During Jackson's career at USC he played in 40 games bringing in five receptions for 42 yards.

=== Nevada ===
Jackson decided to transfer to play for the Nevada Wolfpack. During Jackson's lone season with the Wolfpack in 2023, he recorded 35 receptions for 267 yards.

== Professional career ==
Pre-draft measurables
Height	Weight	Arm length	Hand span	40-yard dash	10-yard split	20-yard split	Vertical jump	Broad jump	Bench press
5 ft 11 3/4 in (1.82 m)	196 lb (89 kg)	31 1/4 in (0.79 m)	9 5/8 in (0.24 m)	4.71 s	1.68 s	2.74 s	33 in (0.84 m)	10 ft 0 in (3.05 m)	11 reps
All values from Pro Day

After not being selected in the 2024 NFL draft, Jackson signed with the Chicago Bears as an undrafted free agent. He was waived on August 26, and later re-signed to the practice squad. He signed a reserve/future contract with Chicago on January 6, 2025. On August 12, Jackson was waived by the Bears.
