= Alijah Vera-Tucker =

American football player (born 1999)

No. 75 – New England Patriots
- Position: Guard
- Roster status: Injured reserve

Personal information
- Born: June 17, 1999 (age 27); Oakland, California, U.S.
- Listed height: 6 ft 4 in (1.93 m)
- Listed weight: 308 lb (140 kg)

Career information
- High school: Bishop O'Dowd (Oakland)
- College: USC (2017–2020)
- NFL draft: 2021: 1st round, 14th overall pick

Career history
- New York Jets (2021–2025); New England Patriots (2026–present)

Awards and highlights
- PFWA All-Rookie Team (2021); Morris Trophy (2020); First-team All-Pac-12 (2020); Second-team All-Pac-12 (2019)

Career NFL statistics as of Week 6, 2026
- Games played: 49
- Games started: 49
- Stats at Pro Football Reference

Solomon Alijah Lewis Vera-Tucker (born June 17, 1999) is an American professional football guard for the New England Patriots of the National Football League (NFL). He played college football for the USC Trojans, where he was awarded the Morris Trophy in 2020 and was a two-time All-Pac-12 selection. Vera-Tucker was selected by the New York Jets in the first round of the 2021 NFL draft.

== Early life ==
Vera-Tucker grew up in Oakland, California and attended Bishop O'Dowd High School. He played offensive tackle and defensive end on the football team and was named an Under Armour All-American as a senior. Vera-Tucker was rated a four-star recruit and committed to play college football at USC over offers from Washington, Oregon, Arizona, Arizona State, California, UCLA and Washington State.

== College career ==
Vera-Tucker redshirted his true freshman season. Vera-Tucker played in all 12 of the Trojans games as a reserve guard and on special teams during his redshirt freshman season. He was named first-team All-Pac-12 Conference by the Associated Press. Vera-Tucker considered entering the 2020 NFL draft, but opted to return to USC for his redshirt junior season. Following the announcement that Pac-12 would postpone the 2020 season due to the COVID-19 pandemic, Vera-Tucker announced that he would opt out of the season in order to focus on preparing for the 2021 NFL draft. Vera-Tucker reversed his decision to opt out after the Pac-12 announced that they would resume fall football.

== Professional career ==
Pre-draft measurables
Height	Weight	Arm length	Hand span	Wingspan	40-yard dash	10-yard split	20-yard split	20-yard shuttle	Three-cone drill	Vertical jump	Broad jump	Bench press
6 ft 4 1/2 in (1.94 m)	308 lb (140 kg)	32 1/8 in (0.82 m)	9 5/8 in (0.24 m)	6 ft 4 7/8 in (1.95 m)	5.10 s	1.77 s	2.95 s	4.63 s	7.70 s	32.0 in (0.81 m)	8 ft 10 in (2.69 m)	32 reps
All values from Pro Day

=== New York Jets ===
Vera-Tucker was selected by the New York Jets in the first round (14th overall) of the 2021 NFL draft. He signed his four-year rookie contract with the Jets on July 20, 2021, worth $15.88 million. He was named the Jets starting left guard, and started 16 games there, and was named to the PFWA All-Rookie Team.

Vera-Tucker was named the Jets starting right guard in 2022 after the team signed left guard Laken Tomlinson. He started at left tackle in Week 4 after an injury to George Fant, then moved to right tackle in Week 5 after an injury to Max Mitchell, and started the next three games. He suffered a torn triceps in Week 7 and was placed on injured reserve on October 25, 2022.

Vera-Tucker returned as the Jets starting right guard in 2023. He moved to right tackle in Week 3 due to injuries. He suffered an Achilles injury in Week 5 and was placed on injured reserve on October 11, 2023.

On April 30, 2024, the Jets picked up the fifth-year option on Vera-Tucker's contract.

Vera-Tucker suffered a torn triceps in practice before Week 1 and was placed on season-ending injured reserve on September 6, 2025.

=== New England Patriots ===
On March 12, 2026, Vera-Tucker signed a three-year, $42 million contract with the New England Patriots.
