= Bru McCoy =

American football player (born 2000)

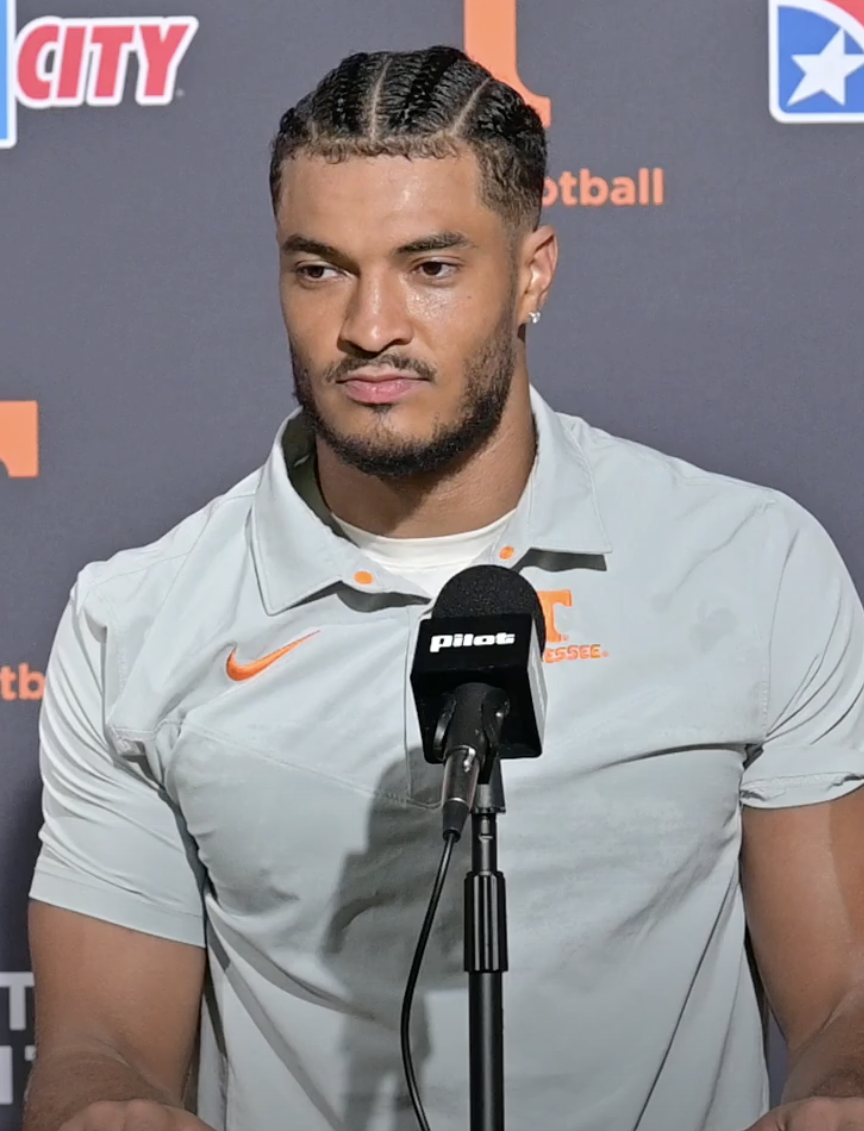
- McCoy in 2024

No. 5
- Position: Wide receiver

Personal information
- Born: June 22, 2000 (age 26); Los Angeles, California, U.S.
- Listed height: 6 ft 2 in (1.88 m)
- Listed weight: 209 lb (95 kg)

Career information
- High school: Mater Dei (Santa Ana, California)
- College: USC (2019–2021); Tennessee (2022–2024)

Awards and highlights
- U.S. Army Player of the Year Award (2018); USA Today High School All-American (2018)
- Stats at ESPN

Horace "Bru" McCoy III (born June 22, 2000) is an American former college football wide receiver. He previously played for the USC Trojans and the Tennessee Volunteers

== Early life ==
Horace McCoy III received the nickname "Bruiser", from his grandmother when he was eight months old; the nickname was later shortened to "Bru". His parents were athletes at Northern Illinois University; his father, Horace II, played college football, and his mother, Shelby, played volleyball. He has two sisters, Alexa and Ava.

Though the McCoy family lives in Rancho Palos Verdes, California, he went to Mater Dei High School in Santa Ana, California, instead of Palos Verdes High School, because he thought it would improve his chances of playing college football. He played for Mater Dei's football team as a wide receiver and linebacker. In his senior year, he had 77 receptions for 1,428 yards and 18 touchdowns as a receiver, and five sacks as a linebacker. MaxPreps named him their National Football Player of the Year. He was named to the All-American Bowl, and won the U.S. Army Player of the Year Award.

== College career ==
=== USC ===
A five star recruit out of high school, 247Sports.com ranked him the ninth-best recruit in the class of 2019. McCoy committed to the University of Southern California (USC) to play for the USC Trojans. He graduated early from Mater Dei and enrolled at USC in January 2019. After 17 days, he opted to transfer to the University of Texas at Austin, as he felt betrayed by Kliff Kingsbury, the Trojans' offensive coordinator, leaving USC to be the head coach for the Arizona Cardinals of the National Football League. He participated in spring practice with the Texas Longhorns, before he decided to leave Texas. He transferred back to USC in June. He missed several months of the 2019 season due to symptoms that were never diagnosed, and took a redshirt for the season. McCoy made his college football debut for the Trojans in the 2020 season. He caught 21 passes for 236 yards and two touchdowns. After a July 2021 arrest for alleged domestic violence, McCoy was suspended indefinitely from the football team. Citing privacy regulations, former USC coach Clay Helton was not forthcoming with more information with the media. Despite all charges being dropped for a lack of evidence, USC did not reinstate McCoy.

=== University of Tennessee ===
In May 2022, McCoy announced his transfer to the University of Tennessee to play for the Tennessee Volunteers football team. For the 2022 season, McCoy recorded 52 receptions for 667 receiving yards and four receiving touchdowns. He had three games over the 100-yard mark in the Volunteers 11–2 season. Tennessee defeated Clemson in the 2022 Orange Bowl 31–14.

In the 2023 season, McCoy recorded 17 receptions for 217 yards and one touchdown in five games. He suffered a season-ending displaced fracture of his right ankle against South Carolina on September 30.

In 2024, McCoy returned with lean muscle weighing in at 215 lbs. He led the Volunteers with a total of 35 receptions and made his 100th reception of his career against Georgia. McCoy shone in the game against UTEP, scoring two touchdowns. This brought his NFL draft projection up to 92nd.

McCoy led the Vols throughout the season. He was recognized as a captain in regular season games against Alabama, Georgia,, and UTEP, and in the playoff game against Ohio State. He captained five total games. Moreover, McCoy attended the 2025 Reese's Senior Bowl.

== Professional career ==
Pre-draft measurables
Height	Weight	Arm length	Hand span
6 ft 2 1/2 in (1.89 m)	209 lb (95 kg)	32 1/8 in (0.82 m)	10 in (0.25 m)
All values from NFL Combine

On May 6, 2025, McCoy announced that he was medically retiring from football.
