= 2022 Oregon State Beavers football team =

American college football season

2022 Oregon State Beavers football

Las Vegas Bowl champion

Las Vegas Bowl, W 30–3 vs. Florida
- Conference: Pac-12 Conference

Ranking
- Coaches: No. 17
- AP: No. 17
- Record: 10–3 (6–3 Pac-12)
- Head coach: Jonathan Smith (5th season)
- Offensive coordinator: Brian Lindgren (5th season)
- Offensive scheme: Multiple
- Defensive coordinator: Trent Bray (1st season)
- Base defense: 3–4
- Home stadium: Reser Stadium

2022 Pac-12 Conference football standings
	Conf.			Overall
Team	W		L	W		L
No. 12 USC y	8	–	1	11	–	3
No. 10 Utah y$	7	–	2	10	–	4
No. 8 Washington	7	–	2	11	–	2
No. 15 Oregon	7	–	2	10	–	3
No. 17 Oregon State	6	–	3	10	–	3
No. 21 UCLA	6	–	3	9	–	4
Washington State	4	–	5	7	–	6
Arizona	3	–	6	5	–	7
California	2	–	7	4	–	8
Arizona State†	1	–	7	1	–	9
Stanford	1	–	8	3	–	9
Colorado	1	–	8	1	–	11
Championship: Utah 47, USC 24
$ – Conference champion; y – Championship game participant; Rankings from AP Poll

The 2022 Oregon State Beavers football team represented Oregon State University during the 2022 NCAA Division I FBS football season. The Beavers played their home games at Reser Stadium in Corvallis, Oregon, and competed as members of the Pac–12 Conference. They were led by head coach Jonathan Smith, in his fifth season. The team finished 10–3, becoming the third team in Oregon State history to achieve 10 wins and accomplishing the second highest win percentage since 1967.

== Schedule ==
Date	Time	Opponent	Rank	Site	TV	Result	Attendance
September 3	7:30 p.m.	Boise State*		Reser Stadium; Corvallis, OR	ESPN	W 34–17	27,732
September 10	7:30 p.m.	at Fresno State*		Bulldog Stadium; Fresno, CA	CBSSN	W 35–32	41,031
September 17	5:00 p.m.	vs. Montana State*		Providence Park; Portland, OR	P12N	W 68–28	25,218
September 24	6:30 p.m.	No. 7 USC		Reser Stadium; Corvallis, OR	P12N	L 14–17	28,769
October 1	11:00 a.m.	at No. 12 Utah		Rice–Eccles Stadium; Salt Lake City, UT	P12N	L 16–42	51,729
October 8	8:00 p.m.	at Stanford		Stanford Stadium; Stanford, CA	ESPN	W 28–27	32,482
October 15	6:00 p.m.	Washington State		Reser Stadium; Corvallis, OR	P12N	W 24–10	28,735
October 22	5:00 p.m.	Colorado		Reser Stadium; Corvallis, OR	P12N	W 42–9	27,679
November 4	7:30 p.m.	at Washington	No. 23	Husky Stadium; Seattle, WA	ESPN2	L 21–24	62,142
November 12	6:00 p.m.	California		Reser Stadium; Corvallis, OR	P12N	W 38–10	28,642
November 19	11:15 a.m.	at Arizona State	No. 23	Sun Devil Stadium; Tempe, AZ	ESPN2	W 31–7	39,551
November 26	12:30 p.m.	No. 9 Oregon	No. 21	Reser Stadium; Corvallis, OR (rivalry)	ABC	W 38–34	28,840
December 17	11:30 a.m.	vs. Florida*	No. 14	Allegiant Stadium; Las Vegas, NV (Las Vegas Bowl)	ESPN	W 30–3	29,750
*Non-conference game; Rankings from AP Poll (and CFP Rankings, after November 1) - Released prior to game; All times are in Pacific time

== Roster ==
2022 Oregon State Beavers football team roster
Players
Coaches
Offense

Pos.	#	Name	Class
WR	0	Tre'Shaun Harrison	Sr
WR	1	Tyjon Lindsey	Sr
WR	2	Anthony Gould	So
QB	3	Tristan Gebbia	Sr
QB	4	Travis Throckmorton	Fr
RB	5	Deshaun Fenwick	Jr
RB	6	Damien Martinez	Fr
WR	7	Silas Bolden	So
RB	8	Jam Griffin	So
WR	9	Makiya Tongue	So
QB	10	Chance Nolan	Jr
WR	13	Jesiah Irish	Jr
WR	14	John Dunmore	So
QB	15	Dom Montiel	Fr
WR	16	Jimmy Valsin III	Fr
QB	17	Ben Gulbranson	Fr
WR	20	Jeremiah Noga	Fr
RB	21	Trey Lowe	Jr
WR	23	Walker Riney	Fr
RB	24	Gavin Haines	Fr
RB	25	Isaiah Newell	Fr
WR	27	Rweha Munyagi Jr.	Jr
WR	28	Trent Walker	Fr
RB	29	Kanoa Shannon	Jr
RB	34	Jake Reichle	Fr
OL	52	Zach Holmes	Fr
OL	53	Marco Balestrieri	Fr
OL	54	Campbell McHarg	Fr
OL	55	Jason White	Fr
OL	56	Jacob Ferenczi	Fr
OL	57	Dylan Lopez	Fr
OL	58	Heneli Bloomfield	Jr
OL	60	Marco Brewer	Jr
OL	61	Tanner Miller	So
OL	62	Joe Quillin	So
OL	63	Luka Vincic	Fr
OL	65	Andrew Johnson	Fr
OL	67	Joshua Gray	So
OL	68	Brandon Kipper	Sr
OL	69	Jacob Strand	Fr
OL	70	Jake Levengood	Jr
OL	71	Tommy Spencer	So
OL	72	Nick Suing	So
OL	73	Tyler Morano	Fr
OL	74	Brian Espinoza	So
OL	75	Taliese Fuaga	So
OL	77	Flavio Gonzalez	Jr
OL	78	Nathan Elu	Fr
OL	79	Tyler Voltin	Fr
WR	80	Trevor Pope	Fr
TE	81	Jake Overman	So
TE	82	Gabe Milbourn	Fr
TE	83	Carter Neuman	Fr
TE	84	Jack Velling	Fr
TE	86	Malik Kelley	Fr
TE	87	J. T. Byrne	Fr
TE	88	Luke Musgrave	Jr
TE	89	Bryce Caufield	Fr

Defense

Pos.	#	Name	Class
DB	0	Akili Arnold	So
ILB	1	Omar Speights	Jr
DB	2	Rejzohn Wright	Sr
DB	3	Jaydon Grant	Sr
DB	4	Jaden Robinson	Jr
DB	5	Alex Austin	So
OLB	6	John McCartan	Jr
DB	7	Alton Julian	Jr
ILB	8	Kyrei Fisher-Morris	Sr
OLB	9	Ryan Franke	So
OLB	10	Andrew Chatfield Jr.	Jr
ILB	12	Jack Colletto	Sr
DB	13	Joe Swen	Fr
ILB	14	Kord Shaw	Fr
DB	15	Sam Mason Jr.	Fr
DB	16	Carlos Mack Jr.	Jr
DB	17	Johnathan Riley	Jr
DB	18	Ian Massey	So
DB	19	Skyler Thomas	So
ILB	20	John Miller	So
DB	21	Ron Hardge III	Sr
DB	22	Wynston Russell	So
DB	23	Ryan Cooper Jr.	Jr
DB	24	Jack Kane	Fr
DB	26	Jhae Drummer	Fr
DB	27	Noble Thomas	Fr
DB	28	Kitan Oladapo	Jr
OLB	29	Cade Brownholtz	So
DB	30	Josiah Johnson	Fr
OLB	31	Matias Malaki-Donaldson	Fr
DB	32	Melvin Jordan IV	Fr
ILB	40	Michael Erhart	So
ILB	41	Jontae Allen	Fr
OLB	42	Jake Parrella	Fr
DL	43	Takari Hickle	Fr
ILB	44	Porter Phillips	Fr
DL	45	Semisi Saluni	So
ILB	46	Brayden Bruener	Fr
ILB	47	Tyree Blake	Fr
DL	52	James Rawls	Jr
ILB	55	Easton Mascarenas-Arnold	So
OLB	56	Riley Sharp	Jr
DL	76	Thomas Sio	So
OLB	82	Cory Stover	So
DL	89	Sebastian Briski	Jr
DL	90	Sione Lolohea	So
DL	92	Jake Wright	Fr
DL	94	Tavis Shippen	Jr
DL	95	Joe Golden	Jr
DL	96	Simon Sandberg	Sr
DL	97	Quincy Wright	Fr
DL	98	Cody Anderson	Sr
DL	99	Isaac Hodgins	Jr

Special teams

Pos.	#	Name	Class
LS	33	Peyton Hogan	Fr
P	34	Max Walker	Fr
K	35	Everett Hayes	Jr
K	36	Atticus Sappington	Fr
P	37	Josh Green	Jr
P	38	Luke Loecher	Sr
K	39	Josh McCormick	Fr
LS	48	Dylan Black	So
LS	49	Connor Meholovitch	Fr

Head coach

- Jonathan Smith

Coordinators/assistant coaches

- Jim Michalczik – Associate head coach/offensive line/run game coordinator
- Brian Lindgren – Offensive Coordinator/quarterbacks
- Trent Bray – Defensive coordinator/linebackers
- Jake Cookus – Special teams coordinator
- Kefense Hynson – Special teams coordinator
- Blue Adams – Defensive backs
- Anthony Perkins– Cornerbacks
- A. J. Steward – Running Backs
- Legi Suiaunoa – Defensive line
- Brian Wozniak – Tight Ends/recruiting coordinator
- Jon Boyer – Offensive quality control
- Brian Michalowski – Defensive quality control
- Ryan Saparto – Special teams quality control
- Jacob Alsadek – Offensive graduate assistant
- Jeremy Bruce – Defensive graduate assistant
- A. J. Cooper – Defensive graduate assistant
- Mike McDonald – Strength and conditioning
- Marco Candido – Assistant, strength and conditioning
- Dustyn Baethke – Assistant, strength and conditioning

Legend

- (C) Team captain
- (S) Suspended
- (I) Ineligible
- Injured
- Redshirt

Roster
Last update: 9/19/22

== Rankings ==
Ranking movements Legend: ██ Increase in ranking ██ Decrease in ranking — = Not ranked RV = Received votes
	Week															
Poll	Pre	1	2	3	4	5	6	7	8	9	10	11	12	13	14	Final
AP	—	RV	RV	RV	RV	—	—	RV	RV	24	RV	25	22	16	17	17
Coaches	RV	RV	RV	RV	RV	—	—	—	RV	RV	RV	RV	22	16	16	17
CFP	Not released									23	—	23	21	15	14	Not released

== Game summaries ==
=== vs Boise State ===
Overall record	Previous meeting	Previous winner
6–4	September 24, 2016	Boise State

Boise State Broncos (0–0) vs Oregon State Beavers (0–0) – Game summary

Quarter	1	2	3	4	Total
Broncos	0	0	10	7	17
Beavers	14	10	3	7	34

at Reser Stadium • Corvallis, Oregon

- Date: September 3, 2022
- Game time: 7:30 p.m.
- Game weather: Sunny, 77 °F (25 °C)
- Game attendance: 27,732
- Referee: Scott Campbell
- TV announcers (ESPN): Sean McDonough (play-by-play), Todd Blackledge (analyst), Molly McGrath (Field Reporter)

Game information

First quarter

- (5:24) OSU – Luke Musgrave 27-yard pass from Chance Nolan, Everett Hayes kick (Drive: 2 plays, 53 yards, 0:54; Oregon State 7-0)
- (1:15) OSU – Tyjon Lindsey 47-yard pass from Chance Nolan, Everett Hayes kick (Drive: 4 plays, 60 yards, 2:01; Oregon State 14-0)

Second quarter

- (10:28) OSU – Everett Hayes 20-yard field goal, (Drive: 4 plays, 3 yards, 1:35; Oregon State 17-0)
- (3:11) OSU – Deshaun Fenwick 12-yard Run, Everett Hayes kick (Drive: 4 plays, 98 yards, 1:33; Oregon State 24-0)

Third quarter

- (12:11) BSU – Jonah Dalmas 41-yard field goal (Drive: 4 plays, 2 yards, 1:24; Oregon State 24-3)
- (2:57) OSU – Everett Hayes 23-yard field goal (Drive: 7 plays, 55 yards, 4:26; Oregon State 27-3)
- (2:10) BSU – Taylen Green 74-yard run, Jonah Dalmas kick (Drive: 2 plays, 75 yards, 0:47; Oregon State 27-10)

Fourth quarter

- (13:05) BSU – Taylen Green 4-yard run, Jonah Dalmas kick (Drive: 6 plays, 67 yards, 1:59; Oregon State 27-17)
- (10:39) OSU – Jack Colletto 41-yard run, Everett Hayes kick (Drive: 5 plays, 65 yards, 2:26; Oregon State 34-17)

Statistics	BSU	OSU
First downs	17	17
Total yards	311	470
Rushes/yards	31–126	37–178
Passing yards	185	292
Passing: Comp–Att–Int	23–36–3	15–24–2
Time of possession	24:58	35:02

Team	Category	Player	Statistics
Boise State	Passing	Taylen Green	19/28, 255 yards, INT
Boise State	Rushing	Taylen Green	11 carries, 102 yards, 2 TD
Boise State	Receiving	Ashton Jeanty	6 receptions, 52 yards
Oregon State	Passing	Chance Nolan	14/23, 251 yards, 2 TD, 2 INT
Oregon State	Rushing	Jack Colletto	3 carries, 44 yards, TD
Oregon State	Receiving	Luke Musgrave	6 receptions, 89 yards, TD

=== at Fresno State ===
Overall record	Previous meeting	Previous winner
6–8	September 5, 2003	Fresno State

Oregon State Beavers (1–0) vs Fresno State Bulldogs (1–0) – Game summary

Quarter	1	2	3	4	Total
Beavers	7	7	7	14	35
Bulldogs	7	6	10	9	32

at Bulldog Stadium • Fresno, CA

- Date: September 10, 2022
- Game time: 7:30 p.m.
- Game weather: Cloudy, 88 °F (31 °C)
- Game attendance: 41,032
- Referee: Jonathan Noli
- TV announcers (CBS): Alex Del Barrio (play-by-play), Donte Whitner (analyst)

Game information

First quarter

- (5:39) OSU – Jack Colletto 2-yard run, Everett Hayes kick (Drive: 13 plays, 47 yards, 6:52; Oregon State 7–0)
- (2:19) FRES – Jordan Mims 1-yard run, Abraham Montano kick (Drive: 6 plays, 73 yards, 3:20; Tied 7–7)

Second quarter

- (8:57) OSU – Silas Bolden 36-yard run, Everett Hayes kick (Drive: 4 plays, 65 yards, 1:49; Oregon State 14–7)
- (3:04) FRES – Abraham Montano 26-yard field goal (Drive: 13 plays, 67 yards, 5:53; Oregon State 14–10)
- (0:05) FRES – Abraham Montano 23-yard field goal (Drive: 8 plays, 30 yards, 1:52; Oregon State 14–13)

Third quarter

- (10:21) FRES – Abraham Montano 43-yard field goal (Drive: 11 plays, 49 yards, 4:39; Fresno State 16–14)
- (6:04) FRES – Jordan Mims 11-yard run, Abraham Montano kick (Drive: 4 plays, 80 yards, 1:21; Fresno State 23–14)
- (4:04) OSU – Deshaun Fenwick 4-yard run, Everett Hayes kick (Drive: 5 plays, 77 yards, 1:54; Fresno State 23–21)

Fourth quarter

- (10:31) FRES – Abraham Montano 37-yard field goal (Drive: 8 plays, 49 yards, 3:01; Fresno State 26–21)
- (1:50) OSU – Tre'Shaun Harrison 17-yard pass from Chance Nolan, Chance Nolan two-point pass to Silas Bolden (Drive: 5 plays, 66 yards, 2:29; Oregon State 29–26)
- (1:05) FRES – Erik Brooks 4-yard pass from Jake Haener (Drive: 5 plays, 75 yards, 0:45; Fresno State 32–29)
- (0:00) OSU – Jack Colletto 2-yard run (Drive: 7 plays, 73 yards, 0:58; Oregon State 35–32)

Statistics	OSU	FRES
First downs	23	24
Total yards	397	492
Rushes/yards	37–178	29–132
Passing yards	219	360
Passing: Comp–Att–Int	14–27–0	29–46–0
Time of possession	26:50	33:10

Team	Category	Player	Statistics
Oregon State	Passing	Chance Nolan	14/27, 219 yards, TD
Oregon State	Rushing	Deshaun Fenwick	19 carries, 102 yards, TD
Oregon State	Receiving	Luke Musgrave	5 receptions, 80 yards
Fresno State	Passing	Jake Haener	29/45, 360 yards, TD
Fresno State	Rushing	Jordan Mims	21 carries, 122 yards, 2 TD
Fresno State	Receiving	Nikko Remigio	6 receptions, 100 yards

=== vs Montana State (FCS) ===
Previous meeting
First ever Meeting

Montana State Bobcats (2–0) vs Oregon State Beavers (2–0) – Game Summary

Quarter	1	2	3	4	Total
No. 4 (FCS) Bobcats	7	7	7	7	28
Beavers	7	27	20	14	68

at Providence Park • Portland, OR

- Date: September 17, 2022
- Game time: 5:00 p.m.
- Game weather: Cloudy, 68 °F (20 °C)
- Game attendance: 25,218
- Referee: Francisco Villar
- TV announcers (Pac-12 Network): Jordan Kent (play-by-play), Nigel Burton (analyst)

Game information

First quarter

- (11:20) OSU – Deshaun Fenwick 25-yard run, Everett Hayes kick (Drive: 7 plays, 90 yards, 3:33; Oregon State 7–0)
- (5:19) MTST – Sean Chambers 7-yard run, Blake Glessner kick (Drive: 10 plays, 66 yards, 5:54; Tied 7–7)

Second quarter

- (14:51) OSU – Tre'Shaun Harrison 6-yard pass from Chance Nolan, Everett Hayes kick (Drive: 14 plays, 75 yards, 5:28; Oregon State 14–7)
- (11:09) OSU – Chance Nolan 1-yard run, Everett Hayes kick (Drive: 7 plays, 58 yards, 3:28; Oregon State 21–7)
- (10:53) MTST – Marqui Johnson 98-yard kickoff return, Blake Glessner kick (Drive: 8 plays, 75 yards, 4:34; Oregon State 21–14)
- (6:19) OSU – Silas Bolden 24-yard pass from Chance Nolan, Everett Hayes kick (Drive: 8 plays, 75 yards, 4:34; Oregon State 28–14)
- (4:14) OSU – Anthony Gould 9-yard pass from Chance Nolan (Drive: 2 plays, 12 yards, 0:47; Oregon State 34–14)

Third quarter

- (12:41) OSU – Anthony Gould 80-yard punt return (Drive: 4 plays, 19 yards, 2:19; Oregon State 40–14)
- (7:21) MTST – Sean Chambers 8-yard run, Blake Glessner kick (Drive: 11 plays, 75 yards, 5:20; Oregon State 40–21)
- (5:51) OSU – Damien Martinez 7-yard run, Atticus Sappington kick (Drive: 3 plays, 20 yards, 1:18; Oregon State 47–21)
- (1:09) OSU – Anthony Gould 17-yard pass from Chance Nolan, Atticus Sappington kick (Drive: 5 plays, 33 yards, 1:58; Oregon State 54–21)

Fourth quarter

- (12:33) OSU – Jam Griffin 23-yard run, Atticus Sappington kick (Drive: 6 plays, 54 yards, 2:48; Oregon State 61–21)
- (7:55) MTST – Sean Chambers 1-yard run, Blake Glessner kick (Drive: 8 plays, 65 yards, 4:38; Oregon State 61–28)
- (3:02) OSU – Kanoa Shannon 3-yard run, Atticus Sappington kick (Drive: 10 plays, 64 yards, 4:51; Oregon State 68–28)

Statistics	MTST	OSU
First downs	14	31
Total yards	269	538
Rushes/yards	32–168	42–214
Passing yards	101	324
Passing: Comp–Att–Int	9–18–3	22–29–0
Time of possession	27:38	32:22

Team	Category	Player	Statistics
Montana State	Passing	Tommy Mellott	9/18, 101 yards, 3 INT
Montana State	Rushing	Tommy Mellott	18 carries, 135 yards
Montana State	Receiving	Derryck Snell	1 reception, 27 yards
Oregon State	Passing	Chance Nolan	19/25, 276 yards, 4 TD
Oregon State	Rushing	Deshaun Fenwick	9 carries, 63 yards, TD
Oregon State	Receiving	Tre'Shaun Harrison	8 receptions, 133 yards, TD

=== vs No. 7 USC ===
Overall record	Previous meeting	Previous winner
13–63	September 25, 2021	Oregon State

No. 7 USC Trojans (3–0) vs Oregon State Beavers (3–0) – Game summary

Quarter	1	2	3	4	Total
No. 7 Trojans	0	3	0	14	17
Beavers	0	7	0	7	14

at Reser Stadium • Corvallis, OR

- Date: September 24, 2022
- Game time: 6:30 p.m.
- Game weather: Sunny, 76 °F (24 °C)
- Game attendance: 28,768
- Referee: Mike Richards
- TV announcers (Pac-12 Network): Ted Robinson (play-by-play), Yogi Roth (analyst)

Game information

First quarter

None

Second quarter

- (13:18) OSU – Deshaun Fenwick 4-yard run, Everett Hayes kick (Drive: 10 plays, 80 yards, 4:58; Oregon State 7–0)
- (5:38) USC – Denis Lynch 42-yard field goal (Drive: 7 plays, 41 yards, 1:59; Oregon State 7–3)

Third quarter

None

Fourth quarter

- (14:18) USC – Travis Dye 7-yard run, Denis Lynch kick (Drive: 7 plays, 26 yards, 3:07; USC 10–7)
- (4:41) OSU – Jam Griffin 18-yard run, Everett Hayes kick (Drive: 2 plays, 22 yards, 0:44; Oregon State 14–10)
- (1:13) USC – Jordan Addison 21-yard pass from Caleb Williams, Denis Lynch kick (Drive: 11 plays, 84 yards, 3:22; USC 17–14)

Statistics	USC	OSU
First downs	21	18
Total yards	357	320
Rushes/yards	37–177	31–153
Passing yards	180	167
Passing: Comp–Att–Int	16–36–0	17–29–4
Time of possession	30:15	29:45

Team	Category	Player	Statistics
USC	Passing	Caleb Williams	16/36, 180 yards, TD
USC	Rushing	Travis Dye	19 carries, 133 yards, TD
USC	Receiving	Tahj Washington	6 receptions, 67 yards
Oregon State	Passing	Chance Nolan	17/29, 167 yards, 4 INT
Oregon State	Rushing	Jam Griffin	12 carries, 84 yards, TD
Oregon State	Receiving	Tyjon Lindsey	5 receptions, 44 yards

=== at No. 12 Utah ===
Overall record	Previous meeting	Previous winner
12–11	October 23, 2021	Oregon State

Oregon State Beavers (3–1) at No. 12 Utah Utes (3–1) – Game summary

Quarter	1	2	3	4	Total
Beavers	7	6	3	0	16
No. 12 Utes	14	7	14	7	42

at Rice-Eccles Stadium • Salt Lake City, Utah

- Date: October 1, 2022
- Game time: 12:00 p.m. MST
- Game weather: Sunny, 62 °F (17 °C)
- Game attendance: 51,729
- Referee: Mike McCabe
- TV announcers (Pac-12 Network): Ted Robinson (play-by-play), Yogi Roth (analyst)

Game information

First quarter

- (13:03) UTAH – Jaylen Dixon 19-yard pass from Cameron Rising, Jordon Noyes kick (Drive: 3 plays, 25 yards, 1:15; Utah 7–0)
- (9:36) OSU – Silas Bolden 29-yard run, Atticus Sappington kick (Drive: 7 plays, 79 yards, 3:21; Tied 7–7)
- (7:21) UTAH – Clark Phillips III 38-yard interception return, Jordon Noyes kick (Utah 14–7)

Second quarter

- (14:13) UTAH – Cameron Rising 24-yard run, Jordon Noyes kick (Drive: 5 plays, 60 yards, 1:07; Utah 21–7)
- (9:38) OSU – Atticus Sappington 26-yard field goal (Drive: 9 plays, 42 yards, 4:35; Utah 21–10)
- (0:37) OSU – Atticus Sappington 26-yard field goal (Drive: 10 plays, 72 yards, 2:48; Utah 21–13)

Third quarter

- (9:46) OSU – Atticus Sappington 31-yard field goal (Drive: 8 plays, 44 yards, 3:42; Utah 21–16)
- (6:18) UTAH – Devaughn Vele 16-yard pass from Cameron Rising, Jordon Noyes kick (Drive: 8 plays, 75 yards, 3:28; Utah 28–16)
- (1:57) UTAH – Jaylen Dixon 22-yard run, Jordon Noyes kick (Drive: 2 plays, 30 yards, 0:43; Utah 35–16)

Fourth quarter

- (12:38) UTAH – Dalton Kincaid 4-yard pass from Cameron Rising, Jordon Noyes kick (Drive: 5 plays, 36 yards, 2:18; Utah 42–16)

Statistics	OSU	UTAH
First downs	21	20
Total yards	417	361
Rushes/yards	37–171	31–162
Passing yards	246	199
Passing: Comp–Att–Int	16–30–4	19–25–0
Time of possession	31:15	28:45

Team	Category	Player	Statistics
Oregon State	Passing	Ben Gulbranson	12/21, 177 yards, 2 INT
Oregon State	Rushing	Deshaun Fenwick	10 carries, 44 yards
Oregon State	Receiving	Tre'Shaun Harrison	5 receptions, 96 yards
Utah	Passing	Cameron Rising	19/25, 199 yards, 3 TD
Utah	Rushing	Cameron Rising	7 carries, 73 yards, TD
Utah	Receiving	Devaughn Vele	7 receptions, 94 yards, TD

=== at Stanford ===
Overall record	Previous meeting	Previous winner
27–59–3	November 13, 2021	Oregon State

Oregon State Beavers (3–2) at Stanford Cardinal (1–3) – Game summary

Quarter	1	2	3	4	Total
Beavers	0	7	3	18	28
Cardinal	7	10	7	3	27

at Stanford Stadium • Stanford, CA

- Date: October 8, 2022
- Game time: 8:00 p.m.
- Game weather: Clear, 63 °F (17 °C)
- Game attendance: 50,424
- Referee: Mark Duddy
- TV announcers (ESPN): Mark Jones (play-by-play), Robert Griffin III (analyst), Quint Kessenich (sideline)

Game information

First quarter

- (3:37) STAN – Casey Filkins 1-yard run, Joshua Karty kick (Drive: 12 plays, 78 yards, 5:30; Stanford 7–0)

Second quarter

- (10:52) OSU – Jack Colletto 1-yard run, Atticus Sappington kick (Drive: 16 plays, 99 yards, 7:45; Tied 7–7)
- (8:44) STAN – Joshua Karty 47-yard field goal (Drive: 5 plays, 36 yards, 2:08; Stanford 10–7)
- (0:58) STAN – Brycen Tremayne 21-yard pass from Tanner McKee, Joshua Karty kick (Drive: 7 plays, 61 yards, 1:38; Stanford 17–7)

Third quarter

- (7:03) OSU – Atticus Sappington 40-yard field goal (Drive: 11 plays, 53 yards, 6:37; Stanford 17–10)
- (3:41) STAN – Brycen Tremayne 37-yard pass from Tanner McKee, Joshua Karty kick (Drive: 4 plays, 65 yards, 0:52; Stanford 24–10)

Fourth quarter

- (14:50) OSU – Silas Bolden 21-yard pass from Ben Gulbranson (Drive: 8 plays, 75 yards, 3:51; Stanford 24–16)
- (5:45) OSU – Damien Martinez 43-yard run (Drive: 3 plays, 66 yards, 1:14; Stanford 24–22)
- (0:58) STAN – Joshua Karty 46-yard field goal (Drive: 11 plays, 49 yards, 4:47; Stanford 27–22)
- (0:13) OSU – Tre'Shaun Harrison 56-yard pass from Ben Gulbranson (Drive: 3 plays, 76 yards, 0:45; Oregon State 28–27)

Statistics	OSU	STAN
First downs	23	19
Total yards	442	359
Rushes/yards	40–192	27–90
Passing yards	250	269
Passing: Comp–Att–Int	20–29–0	20–34–1
Time of possession	33:42	26:18

Team	Category	Player	Statistics
Oregon State	Passing	Ben Gulbranson	20/29, 250 yards, 2 TD
Oregon State	Rushing	Damien Martinez	3 carries, 83 yards, TD
Oregon State	Receiving	Tre'Shaun Harrison	7 receptions, 104 yards, TD
Stanford	Passing	Tanner McKee	20/33, 269 yards, 2 TD, INT
Stanford	Rushing	Casey Filkins	21 carries, 62 yards, TD
Stanford	Receiving	Brycen Tremayne	6 receptions, 82 yards, 2 TD

=== vs Washington State ===
Overall record	Previous meeting	Previous winner
47–56	October 9, 2021	Washington State

Washington State Cougars (4–2) vs Oregon State Beavers (4–2) – Game summary

Quarter	1	2	3	4	Total
Cougars	0	3	7	0	10
Beavers	7	3	7	7	24

at Reser Stadium • Corvallis, OR

- Date: October 15, 2022
- Game time: 6:00 p.m.
- Game weather: Sunny, 79 °F (26 °C)
- Game attendance: 28,735
- Referee: Steven Strimling
- TV announcers (Pac-12 Network): Roxy Bernstein (play-by-play), Lincoln Kennedy (analyst)

Game information
'First quarter
- (10:33) OSU – Jack Colletto 1-yard run, Atticus Sappington kick (Drive: 8 plays, 40 yards, 4:27; Oregon State 7–0)

Second quarter

- (14:00) OSU – Atticus Sappington 26-yard field goal (Drive: 12 plays, 87 yards, 5:35; Oregon State 10–0)
- (9:20) WSU – Dean Janikowski 29-yard field goal (Drive: 12 plays, 72 yards, 4:34;Oregon State 10–3)

Third quarter

- (8:01) OSU – Anthony Gould 17-yard pass from Ben Gulbranson, Atticus Sappington kick (Drive: 11 plays, 74 yards, 5:34;Oregon State 17–3)
- (4:15) WSU – Jaylen Jenkins 9-yard pass from Cameron Ward, Dean Janikowski kick (Drive: 7 plays, 81 yards, 3:41; Oregon State 17–10)

Fourth quarter

- (14:57) OSU – Jack Colletto 2-yard run, Atticus Sappington kick (Drive: 8 plays, 75 yards, 4:18; Oregon State 24–10)

Statistics	WSU	OSU
First downs	18	21
Total yards	368	344
Rushes/yards	20–23	47–203
Passing yards	345	141
Passing: Comp–Att–Int	25–54–1	12–24–1
Time of possession	25:05	34:55

Team	Category	Player	Statistics
Washington State	Passing	Cam Ward	25/54, 345 yards, TD, INT
Washington State	Rushing	Jaylen Jenkins	6 carries, 42 yards
Washington State	Receiving	Robert Ferrel	5 receptions, 131 yards
Oregon State	Passing	Ben Gulbranson	12/24, 141 yards, TD, INT
Oregon State	Rushing	Damien Martinez	16 carries, 111 yards
Oregon State	Receiving	Jack Velling	4 receptions, 63 yards

=== vs Colorado ===
Overall record	Previous meeting	Previous winner
6–6	November 6, 2021	Colorado

Colorado Buffaloes (1–5) vs Oregon State Beavers (5–2) – Game summary

Quarter	1	2	3	4	Total
Buffaloes	0	3	6	0	9
Beavers	7	14	14	7	42

at Reser Stadium • Corvallis, Oregon

- Date: October 22, 2022
- Game time: 5:00 p.m.
- Game weather: Cloudy, 57 °F (14 °C)
- Game attendance: 27,679
- Referee: Chris Coyte
- TV announcers (Pac-12 Network): Roxy Bernstein (play-by-play), Lincoln Kennedy (analyst)

Game information

First quarter

- (8:09) OSU – Damien Martinez 4-yard run, Atticus Sappington kick (Drive 9 plays, 40 yards, 4:59; Oregon State 7–0)

Second quarter

- (13:30) OSU – Silas Bolden 16-yard pass from Ben Gulbranson, Atticus Sappington kick (Drive 11 plays, 82 yards, 6:07; Oregon State 14–0)
- (8:44) COL – Cole Becker 44-yard field goal (Drive 8 plays, 33 yards, 4:34; Oregon State 14–3)
- (1:45) OSU – Damien Martinez 3-yard run, Atticus Sappington kick (Drive 5 plays, 55 yards, 2:47; Oregon State 21–3)

Third quarter

- (12:30) OSU – Jack Velling 60-yard pass from Ben Gulbranson, Atticus Sappington kick (Drive 8 plays, 80 yards, 5:34; Oregon State 28–3)
- (12:19) OSU – Alex Austin 42-yard interception return, Atticus Sappington kick (1 play, 0 yards, 0:11; Oregon State 35–3)
- (2:38) COL – Jayle Stacks 1-yard run (Drive 9 plays, 80 yards, 4:42; Oregon State 35–9)

Fourth quarter

- (7:38) OSU – Jack Colletto 2-yard run, Atticus Sappington kick (Drive 11 plays, 87 yards, 5:17; Oregon State 42–9)

Statistics	COL	OSU
First downs	17	26
Total yards	290	427
Rushes/yards	28–84	44–270
Passing yards	206	202
Passing: Comp–Att–Int	13–29–2	14–22–0
Time of possession	25:39	34:21

Team	Category	Player	Statistics
Colorado	Passing	J. T. Shrout	13/29, 206 yards, 2 INT
Colorado	Rushing	Jayle Stacks	8 carries, 50 yards, TD
Colorado	Receiving	Jordyn Tyson	3 receptions, 92 yards
Oregon State	Passing	Ben Gulbranson	14/22, 202 yards, 2 TD
Oregon State	Rushing	Damien Martinez	22 carries, 178 yards, 3 TD
Oregon State	Receiving	Jack Velling	1 reception, 60 yards, TD

=== at Washington ===
Overall record	Previous meeting	Previous winner
35–67	October 2, 2021	Oregon State

No. 23 Oregon State Beavers (6–2) at Washington Huskies (6–2) – Game summary

Quarter	1	2	3	4	Total
No. 23 Beavers	7	7	7	0	21
Huskies	0	7	7	10	24

at Husky Stadium • Seattle, WA

- Date: November 4, 2022
- Game time: 7:35 p.m.
- Game weather: Cloudy, 57 °F (14 °C)
- Game attendance: 62,142
- Referee: Michael Mothershed
- TV announcers (ESPN2): Roy Philpott (play-by-play), Andre Ware (analyst), Paul Carcaterra (sideline)

Game information

First quarter

- (10:01) OSU – Deshaun Fenwick 3-yard run, Everett Hayes kick (Drive 9 plays, 75 yards, 4:59; Oregon State 7–0)

Second quarter

- (4:23) WASH – Wayne Taulapapa 2-yard run, Peyton Henry kick (Drive 15 plays, 85 yards, 6:46; Tied 7–7)
- (1:10) OSU – Easton Mascarenas-Arnold 37-yard interception return, Everett Hayes kick (Drive 2 plays, 8 yards, 0:33; Oregon State 14–7)

Third quarter

- (6:47) WASH – Jack Westover 24-yard pass from Michael Penix Jr., Peyton Henry kick (Drive 8 plays, 35 yards, 4:10; Tied 14–14)
- (0:39) OSU – Deshaun Fenwick 19-yard run, Everett Hayes kick (Drive 11 plays, 79 yards, 6:08; Oregon State 21–14)

Fourth quarter

- (11:36) WASH – Wayne Taulapapa 4-yard run, Peyton Henry kick (Drive 9 plays, 66 yards, 4:03; Tied 21–21)
- (0:08) WASH – Peyton Henry 22-yard field goal (Drive 18 plays, 92 yards, 4:25; Washington 24–21)

Statistics	OSU	WASH
First downs	18	24
Total yards	262	398
Rushes/yards	40–175	24–100
Passing yards	87	298
Passing: Comp–Att–Int	12–19–0	30–52–1
Time of possession	31:46	28:14

Team	Category	Player	Statistics
Oregon State	Passing	Ben Gulbranson	12/19, 87 yards
Oregon State	Rushing	Damien Martinez	19 carries, 107 yards
Oregon State	Receiving	Damien Martinez	1 reception, 40 yards
Washington	Passing	Michael Penix Jr.	30/52, 298 yards, TD, INT
Washington	Rushing	Cameron Davis	11 carries, 55 yards
Washington	Receiving	Rome Odunze	7 receptions, 102 yards

=== vs California ===
Overall record	Previous meeting	Previous winner
35–39	October 30, 2021	California

California Golden Bears (3–6) at Oregon State Beavers (6–3) – Game summary

Quarter	1	2	3	4	Total
Golden Bears	0	7	0	3	10
Beavers	14	7	10	7	38

at Reser Stadium • Corvallis, Oregon

- Date: November 12, 2022
- Game time: 6:00 p.m.
- Game weather: Clear, 50 °F (10 °C)
- Game attendance: 28,642
- Referee: Steven Strimling
- TV announcers (Pac-12 Network): Ted Robinson (play-by-play), Yogi Roth (analyst)

Game information

First quarter

- (5:37) OSU – Ben Gulbranson 3-yard run, Everett Hayes kick (Drive: 10 plays, 65 yards, 4:58; Oregon State 7–0)
- (2:14) OSU – Jam Griffin 3-yard run, Everett Hayes kick (Drive: 6 plays, 31 yards, 3:18; Oregon State 14–0)

Second quarter

- (12:01) OSU – Anthony Gould 55-yard punt return, Everett Hayes (Drive: 3 plays, 3 yards, 0:58; Oregon State 21–0)
- (2:33) CAL – Jeremiah Earby 33-yard fumble return, Dario Longhetto (Drive: 4 plays, 15 yards, 1:51; Oregon State 21–7)

Third quarter

- (10:12) OSU – Everett Hayes 49-yard field goal (Drive: 9 plays, 38 yards, 4:41; Oregon State 24–7)
- (4:03) OSU – Tre'Shaun Harrison 8–yard pass from Ben Gulbranson, Everett Hayes (Drive: 7 plays, 70 yards, 4:18; Oregon State 31–7)

Fourth quarter

- (12:30) CAL – Michael Luckhurst 36-yard field goal (Drive: 16 plays, 57 yards, 6:33; Oregon State 31–10)
- (7:00) OSU – Jack Velling 2-yard pass from Ben Gulbranson, Everett Hayes (Drive: 11 plays, 65 yards, 5:20; Oregon State 38–10)

Statistics	CAL	OSU
First downs	10	21
Total yards	156	362
Rushes/yards	16−9	45−166
Passing yards	147	196
Passing: Comp–Att–Int	22−34−1	18−27−0
Time of possession	23:22	36:38

Team	Category	Player	Statistics
California	Passing	Jack Plummer	22/34, 147 yards, INT
California	Rushing	Jaydn Ott	8 carries, 20 yards
California	Receiving	Jeremiah Hunter	6 receptions, 63 yards
Oregon State	Passing	Ben Gulbranson	15/23, 137 yards, 2 TD
Oregon State	Rushing	Damien Martinez	23 carries, 105 yards
Oregon State	Receiving	Tre'Shaun Harrison	8 receptions, 79 yards, TD

=== at Arizona State ===
Overall record	Previous meeting	Previous winner
15–30	November 20, 2021	Oregon State

No. 23 Oregon State Beavers (7–3) at Arizona State Sun Devils (3–7) – Game summary

Quarter	1	2	3	4	Total
No. 23 Beavers	7	7	14	3	31
Sun Devils	0	7	0	0	7

at Sun Devil Stadium • Tempe, Arizona

- Date: November 19, 2022
- Game time: 12:20 p.m.
- Game weather: Sunny; 71 °F (22 °C)
- Game attendance: 39,551
- Referee: Matthew Richards
- TV announcers (ESPN2): Anish Shroff (play-by-play), Brock Osweiler (analyst), Taylor McGregor (sideline)

Game information

First quarter

- (8:22) OSU – Damien Martinez 5-yard run, Everett Hayes kick (Drive 9 plays, 78 yards, 4:44; Oregon State 7–0)

Second quarter

- (1:53) ASU – Xazavian Valladay 11-yard run, Jace Feely kick (Drive 7 plays, 67 yards, 3:00; Tied 7–7)
- (1:00) OSU – Jack Velling 21-yard pass from Ben Gulbranson, Everett Hayes kick (Drive 4 plays, 75 yards, 0:53; Oregon State 14–7)

Third quarter

- (9:43) OSU – Damien Martinez 12-yard run, Everett Hayes kick (Drive 10 plays, 83 yards, 5:10; Oregon State 21–7)
- (0:10) OSU – Ben Gulbranson 8-yard run, Everett Hayes kick (Drive 11 plays, 59 yards, 5:35; Oregon State 28–7)

Fourth quarter

- (9:38) OSU – Everett Hayes 26-yard field goal (Drive 4 plays, 3 yards, 0:51; Oregon State 31–7)

Statistics	OSU	ASU
First downs	28	13
Total yards	443	276
Rushes/yards	42–222	25–154
Passing yards	221	122
Passing: Comp–Att–Int	18–24–0	20–32–0
Time of possession	34:17	25:43

Team	Category	Player	Statistics
Oregon State	Passing	Ben Gulbranson	15/21, 188 yards, TD
Oregon State	Rushing	Damien Martinez	22 carries, 138 yards, 2 TD
Oregon State	Receiving	Jack Velling	3 receptions, 74 yards, TD
Arizona State	Passing	Trenton Bourguet	20/32, 122 yards
Arizona State	Rushing	Xazavian Valladay	13 carries, 109 yards, TD
Arizona State	Receiving	Jalin Conyers	6 receptions, 49 yards

=== vs No. 9 Oregon ===
Overall record	Previous meeting	Previous winner
48–67	November 27, 2021	Oregon

No. 9 Oregon Ducks (9–2) vs No. 21 Oregon State Beavers (8–3) – Game summary

Quarter	1	2	3	4	Total
No. 9 Ducks	7	7	17	3	34
No. 21 Beavers	10	0	7	21	38

at Reser Stadium • Corvallis, Oregon

- Date: November 26, 2022
- Game time: 12:30 p.m.
- Game weather: Partly cloudy, 46 °F (8 °C)
- Game attendance: 28,840
- Referee: Mark Duddy
- TV announcers (ABC): Dave Flemming (play-by-play), Rod Gilmore (analyst), Tiffany Blackmon (sideline)

Game information

First quarter

- (10:20) OSU – Everett Hayes 50-yard field goal (Drive: 9 plays, 44 yards, 4:40; Oregon State 3–0)
- (7:57) ORE – Chase Cota 44-yard pass from Bo Nix, Camden Lewis kick (Drive: 6 plays, 75 yards, 2:23; Oregon 7–3)
- (2:33) OSU – Ben Gulbranson 1-yard run, Everett Hayes kick (Drive: 13 plays, 75 yards, 5:24; Oregon State 10–7)

Second quarter

- (0:14) ORE – Troy Franklin 9-yard pass from Bo Nix, Camden Lewis kick (Drive: 13 plays, 95 yards, 3:59; Oregon 14–10)

Third quarter

- (13:47) ORE – Jordan James 2-yard run, Camden Lewis kick (Drive: 1 plays, 2 yards, 0:05; Oregon 21–10)
- (9:02) ORE – Noah Whittington 5-yard run, Camden Lewis kick (Drive: 8 plays, 67 yards, 3:21; Oregon 28–10)
- (4:46) ORE – Camden Lewis 42-yard field goal (Drive: 7 plays, 18 yards, 3:38; Oregon 31–10)
- (2:57) OSU – Deshaun Fenwick 4-yard run, Everett Hayes kick (Drive: 4 plays, 75 yards, 1:49; Oregon 31–17)

Fourth quarter

- (14:57) ORE – Camden Lewis 24-yard field goal (Drive: 7 plays, 69 yards, 3:00; Oregon 34–17)
- (13:24) OSU – Isaiah Newell 15-yard run, Everett Hayes kick (Drive: 3 plays, 36 yards, 1:33; Oregon 34–24)
- (12:13) OSU – Ben Gulbranson 1-yard run, Everett Hayes kick (Drive: 2 plays, 2 yards, 0:11; Oregon 34–31)
- (8:11) OSU – Isaiah Newell 6-yard run, Everett Hayes kick (Drive: 4 plays, 28 yards, 1:28; Oregon State 38–34)

Statistics	ORE	OSU
First downs	26	19
Total yards	470	328
Rushes/yards	42–143	43–268
Passing yards	327	60
Passing: Comp–Att–Int	27–41–0	6–13–0
Time of possession	34:47	25:13

Team	Category	Player	Statistics
Oregon	Passing	Bo Nix	27/41, 327 yards, 2 TD
Oregon	Rushing	Noah Whittington	16 carries, 81 yards, TD
Oregon	Receiving	Chase Cota	9 receptions, 136 yards, TD
Oregon State	Passing	Ben Gulbranson	6/13, 60 yards, 2 INT
Oregon State	Rushing	Damien Martinez	15 carries, 103 yards
Oregon State	Receiving	Silas Bolden	2 receptions, 23 yards

=== vs Florida (Las Vegas Bowl) ===
Previous meeting
First ever Meeting

Florida Gators (6–6) vs No. 14 Oregon State Beavers (9–3) – Game summary
(2022 Las Vegas Bowl)

Quarter	1	2	3	4	Total
Gators	0	0	0	3	3
No. 14 Beavers	7	3	13	7	30

at Allegiant Stadium • Paradise, Nevada

- Date: December 17, 2022
- Game time: 11:30 a.m.
- Game weather: Indoors
- Game attendance: 29,750
- Referee: Riley Johnson
- TV announcers (ESPN): Dave Pasch (play-by-play), Kirk Herbstreit (color), Pat McAfee (analyst), Laura Rutledge (sideline reporter)

Game information

First quarter

- (2:10) OSU – Tyjon Lindsey 8-yard run, Everett Hayes kick (Drive: 8 plays, 65 yards, 3:39; Oregon State 7–0)

Second quarter

- (4:32) OSU – Everett Hayes 27-yard field goal (Drive: 9 plays, 59 yards, 5:20; Oregon State 10–0)

Third quarter

- (10:20) OSU – Silas Bolden 15-yard pass from Ben Gulbranson, Everett Hayes kick (Drive: 10 plays, 64 yards, 4:40; Oregon State 17–0)
- (8:44) OSU – Ben Gulbranson 7-yard run (Drive: 2 plays, 7 yards, 0:25; Oregon State 23–0)

Fourth quarter

- (13:02) OSU – Jam Griffin 2-yard run, Everett Hayes kick (Drive: 13 plays, 98 yards, 6:33; Oregon State 30–0)
- (0:37) FLA – Adam Mihalek 40-yard field goal (Drive: 12 plays, 64 yards, 5:14; Oregon State 30–3)

Statistics	FLA	OSU
First downs	13	24
Total yards	219	353
Rushes/yards	33–39	39–164
Passing yards	180	189
Passing: Comp–Att–Int	13–22–0	17–26–0
Time of possession	30:25	29:35

Team	Category	Player	Statistics
Florida	Passing	Jack Miller	13/22, 180 yards
Florida	Rushing	Montrell Johnson Jr.	11 carries, 14 yards
Florida	Receiving	Ricky Pearsall	4 receptions, 65 yards
Oregon State	Passing	Ben Gulbranson	12/19, 165 yards, TD
Oregon State	Rushing	Deshaun Fenwick	21 carries, 107 yards
Oregon State	Receiving	Silas Bolden	6 receptions, 99 yards, TD
