= 2022 Las Vegas Bowl =

Postseason college football bowl game

2022 SRS Distribution Las Vegas Bowl
- 30th Las Vegas Bowl
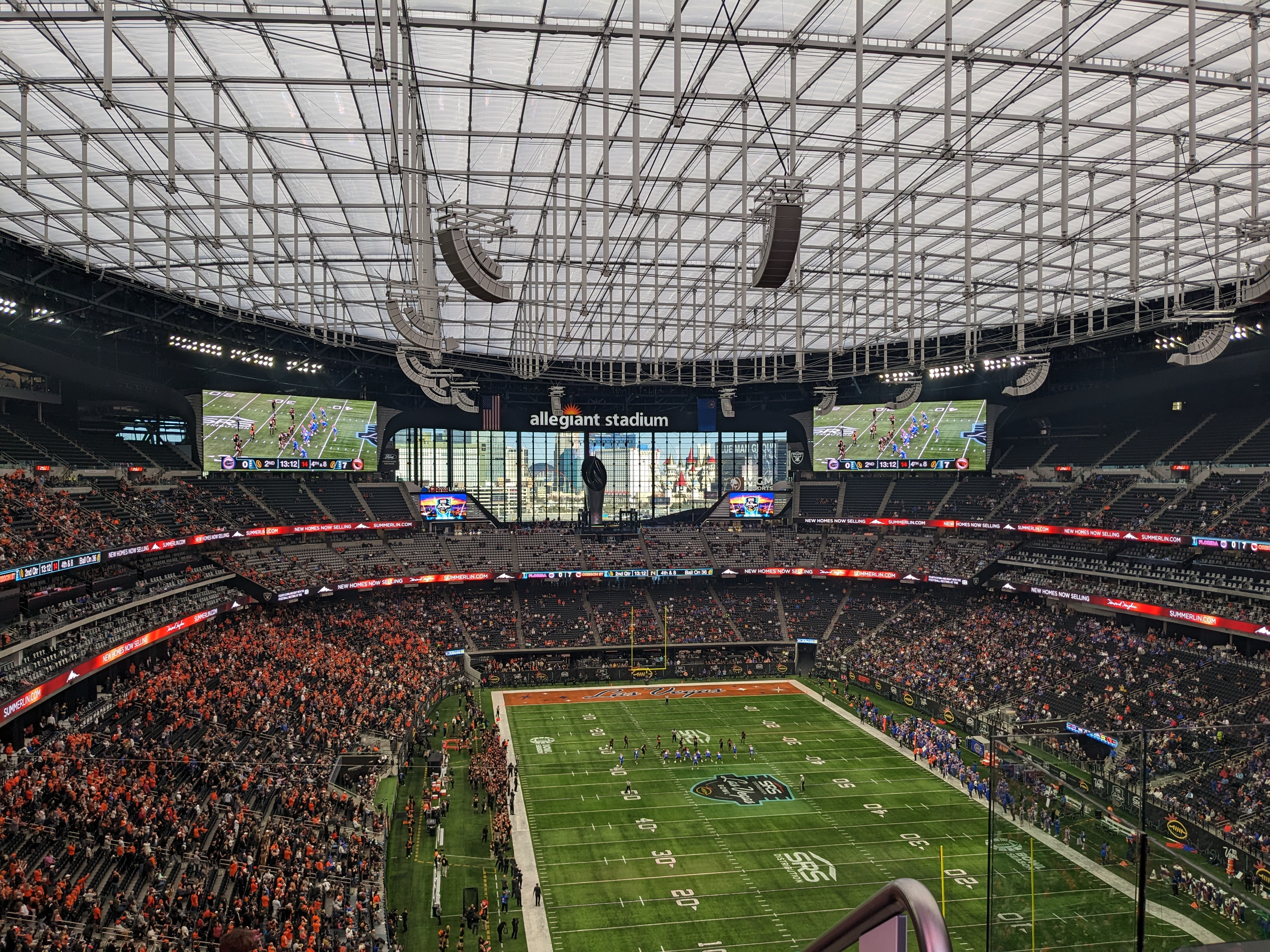
- Allegiant Stadium and the teams at scrimmage during the second quarter
Florida Gators	Oregon State Beavers
(6–6)	(9–3)
SEC	Pac-12
3	30
Head coach: Billy Napier	Head coach: Jonathan Smith
	AP / Coaches / CFP; 17 / 16 / 14
	1	2	3	4	Total
Florida	0	0	0	3	3
Oregon State	7	3	13	7	30
- Date: December 17, 2022
- Season: 2022
- Stadium: Allegiant Stadium
- Location: Paradise, Nevada
- MVP: Ben Gulbranson (QB, Oregon State)
- Favorite: Oregon State by 8.5
- Referee: Riley Johnson (ACC)
- Attendance: 29,750
- Payout: US$2,900,000

United States TV coverage
- Network: ESPN
- Announcers: Dave Pasch (play-by-play), Kirk Herbstreit and Pat McAfee (analysts), and Laura Rutledge (sideline)

The 2022 Las Vegas Bowl was a college football bowl game played on December 17, 2022, at Allegiant Stadium in Paradise, Nevada. The 30th annual Las Vegas Bowl, the game featured Oregon State from the Pac-12 Conference and Florida from the Southeastern Conference (SEC). The game began at 11:35 a.m. PST and aired on ESPN. It was one of the 2022–23 bowl games concluding the 2022 FBS football season. Sponsored by roofing distribution company SRS Distribution, the game was officially known as the SRS Distribution Las Vegas Bowl.

== Teams ==
The Las Vegas Bowl featured the Florida Gators from the Southeastern Conference and the Oregon State Beavers from the Pac-12 Conference. This was the first meeting between the teams.

This was the 19th bowl game appearance for Oregon State, and they entered with a bowl record of 11–7. The Beavers had appeared in the Las Vegas Bowl twice before: they defeated New Mexico in the 2003 game and lost to BYU in the 2009 game. The game was Florida's 48th bowl game appearance, and they entered with a record of 24–23 across all prior appearances. This was the first appearance in the Las Vegas Bowl — and in a bowl game in the state of Nevada — for the Gators.

=== Florida ===
In Billy Napier's debut season with the program, the Gators kicked off their campaign with an upset victory over No. 7 Utah, vaulting them into the AP Poll at No. 12. They suffered a setback in their conference opener the next week as they lost by ten to No. 20 Kentucky, but rebounded with a narrow win over South Florida closed out their three-game home stretch to begin the year. They fell out of the rankings following a five-point defeat at No. 11 Tennessee the next week in a game that was visited by College GameDay. After delaying their fifth game by a day due to Hurricane Ian, the Gators hosted Eastern Washington and won, and they played Missouri the next Saturday for homecoming in a game that they also won. They were unable to keep up their good form, as the Gators fell to LSU by ten points at home before heading into a bye week. They fell back to .500 with a rivalry loss against No. 1 Georgia in Jacksonville to conclude the month of October. Florida responded with a pair of conference wins, the second of which earned them bowl eligibility: first on the road against Texas A&M and second at home against South Carolina. The Gators' final SEC game resulted in an upset loss to Vanderbilt by seven points, and Florida's regular season concluded with a rivalry loss to Florida State, also by seven. The Gators accepted their bid to the Las Vegas Bowl on December 4, and entered with a 6–6 overall record and a 3–5 record in SEC play.

On December 5, Florida quarterback Anthony Richardson announced that he would forgo playing in the bowl game and instead declare for the NFL draft. As a result, Napier announced on December 8 that redshirt freshman Jack Miller III would start at quarterback for the Gators in Richardson's place.

=== Oregon State ===
Jonathan Smith's fifth year at the helm of the Oregon State program began with a trio of non-conference games: one home, one away, and one played at a neutral site. The Beavers' opener saw them defeat Boise State and their first road contest of the season resulted in a three-point win over Fresno State after a game-winning touchdown on the game's last play. They improved to 3–0 with a 40-point win over Montana State in Portland. Two ranked opponents waited for Oregon State as the Beavers entered Pac-12 play with a loss to No. 7 USC, by three points, followed by a loss to No. 12 Utah, by 26 points. The Beavers rebounded with a one-point win over Stanford before returning home to face Washington State, whom they defeated by 14 points. OSU earned bowl eligibility the following week by defeating Colorado at home, 42–9. After entering the rankings for the first time this season at No. 23, the Beavers fell to Washington in a Friday night road game, but regained their place in the top 25 with a victory the next week against California. In their final road game, Oregon State traveled to Tempe and beat Arizona State by 24 points, putting them at No. 21 in the College Football Playoff rankings entering their rivalry game with No. 9 Oregon. The Beavers rallied from a 21-point third quarter deficit to beat the Ducks by 4, marking the end of their best regular season under Jonathan Smith.

The Beavers accepted their bowl bid on December 4; they entered with a 9–3 record and a 6–3 mark in conference play.

== Game summary ==
The game was originally scheduled for 4:30 p.m. PST on ABC, but was moved up after the NFL flexed the New England Patriots–Las Vegas Raiders game out of NBC Sunday Night Football in order to allow the Raiders, who play their home games at Allegiant Stadium, more time to prepare the venue. The game's original time and network was moved to be the new time and network for the New Mexico Bowl as a result.

The officiating crew for the game, representing the Atlantic Coast Conference, was led by referee Riley Johnson and umpire Mark Wilson.

Due in part to many players sitting out the bowl game in order to avoid an injury, the Gators offense struggled mightily in the game. Florida scored a field goal with just 37 seconds left in the game to barely avoid its first shutout since October 29, 1988 and extend its all time NCAA record of avoiding a shutout to 436 games.

2022 SRS Distribution Las Vegas Bowl

Quarter	1	2	3	4	Total
Florida	0	0	0	3	3
No. 14 Oregon State	7	3	13	7	30

at Allegiant Stadium • Paradise, Nevada

- Date: Saturday, December 17, 2022
- Game time: 11:30 a.m. PST
- Game weather: Indoor
- Referee: Riley Johnson
- TV announcers (ESPN): Dave Pasch (play-by-play), Kirk Herbstreit and Pat McAfee (analysts), and Laura Rutledge (sideline)
- Box score

Scoring summary

Quarter	Time	Drive			Team	Scoring information	Score	
Quarter	Time	Plays	Yards	TOP	Team	Scoring information	Florida	Oregon State
1	2:10	8	65	3:39	Oregon State	Tyjon Lindsey 8-yard touchdown run, Everett Hayes kick good	0	7
2	4:32	9	59	5:20	Oregon State	27-yard field goal by Everett Hayes	0	10
3	10:20	10	64	4:33	Oregon State	Silas Bolden 15-yard touchdown reception from Ben Gulbranson, Everett Hayes kick good	0	17
3	8:44	3	7	0:25	Oregon State	Ben Gulbranson 7-yard touchdown run, Atticus Sappington kick good	0	23
4	13:02	13	98	6:33	Oregon State	Jam Griffin 2-yard touchdown run, Atticus Sappington kick good	0	30
4	0:37	12	64	5:14	Florida	40-yard field goal by Adam Mihalek	3	30
"TOP" = time of possession. For other American football terms, see Glossary of American football.							0	30

== Statistics ==
Team statistical comparison
Statistic	Florida	Oregon State
First downs	13	24
First downs rushing	3	11
First downs passing	9	10
First downs penalty	1	3
Third down efficiency	5–14	7–12
Fourth down efficiency	0–2	1–1
Total plays–net yards	55–219	65–353
Rushing attempts–net yards	33–39	39–164
Yards per rush	1.2	4.2
Yards passing	180	189
Pass completions–attempts	13–22	17–26
Interceptions thrown	0	0
Punt returns–total yards	1–(−1)	1–13
Kickoff returns–total yards	4–91	1–26
Punts–average yardage	5–45.2	3–55.3
Fumbles–lost	2–0	0–0
Penalties–yards	11–82	7–50
Time of possession	30:25	29:35

Florida statistics
Gators passing
	C–A	Yds	TD–INT
Jack Miller III	13–22	180	0–0
Gators rushing
	Car	Yds	TD
Montrell Johnson Jr.	11	14	0
Trevor Etienne	8	14	0
Jack Miller III	13	13	0
Ricky Pearsall	1	−2	0
Gators receiving
	Rec	Yds	TD
Ricky Pearsall	4	65	0
Thai Chiaokhiao-Bowman	2	53	0
Caleb Douglas	2	25	0
Jonathan Odom	2	24	0
Ja'Quavion Fraziars	1	10	0
Trevor Etienne	1	9	0
Montrell Johnson Jr.	1	−6	0

Oregon State statistics
Beavers passing
	C–A	Yds	TD–INT
Ben Gulbranson	12–19	165	1–0
Tristan Gebbia	5–6	24	0–0
Tyjon Lindsey	0–1	0	0–0
Beavers rushing
	Car	Yds	TD
Deshaun Fenwick	20	107	0
Jack Colletto	2	17	0
Ben Gulbranson	5	15	1
Jesiah Irish	2	15	0
Damien Martinez	3	12	0
Tyjon Lindsey	1	8	1
Jam Griffin	2	2	1
Kanoa Shannon	1	2	0
TEAM	1	−2	0
Tristan Gebbia	1	−12	0
Beavers receiving
	Rec	Yds	TD
Silas Bolden	6	99	1
John Dunmore	5	42	0
Jack Velling	2	21	0
Isaiah Newell	1	11	0
Jesiah Irish	1	9	0
Tyjon Lindsey	2	7	0
