= Tre'Shaun Harrison =

American football player (born 2000)

Profile
- Position: Wide receiver

Personal information
- Born: June 26, 2000 (age 26); Seattle, Washington, U.S.
- Listed height: 5 ft 11 in (1.80 m)
- Listed weight: 188 lb (85 kg)

Career information
- High school: Garfield (Seattle, Washington)
- College: Florida State (2018–2019); Oregon State (2020–2022)
- NFL draft: 2023: undrafted

Career history
- Tennessee Titans (2023–2024)*; Arlington Renegades (2025)*; Hamilton Tiger-Cats (2025)*
- * Offseason or practice squad member only
- Stats at Pro Football Reference

Tre'Shuan Harrison (born June 26, 2000) is an American professional football wide receiver. He played college football at Florida State and Oregon State.

== Early life ==
Harrison was born in Seattle, Washington and attended Garfield High School. In Harrison's career he caught 100 passes for 1,968 yards and 17 touchdowns, he also rushed for 610 yards and four touchdowns. Harrison also played a little on defense racking up 19 tackles, a sack, and two interceptions. Harrison would decide to commit to play college football at the Florida State, over other schools such as Oregon, and Utah.

== College career ==
=== Florida State ===
==== 2018 season ====
Harrison made his college debut against Northern Illinois, where he caught 3 passes for 34 yards. Later in the season Harrison caught his first career touchdown against Wake Forest. Harrison finished the season with 10 receptions for 66 yards and a touchdown.

==== 2019 season ====
In Week two, Harrison made his season debut, catching three receptions for 43 yards and a touchdown, as he helped Florida State beat Louisiana–Monroe 45–44. In Week four, Harrison brought in four receptions for 54 yards, as he helped the Seminoles beat Louisville 35–24. In Week 12, Harrison had his best game as a Seminole against North Alabama, where he brought in 3 receptions for 94 yards and a 39-yard touchdown to help Florida State become bowl eligible. Harrison finished the year with 27 receptions for 289 yards and two touchdowns. After the conclusion of the season, Harrison announced he had decided to enter his name into the transfer portal.

=== Oregon State ===
==== 2020 season ====
Harrison would ultimately decide to transfer to Oregon State. In Harrison's Oregon State debut, he brought in five passes for 91 yards in a loss to Stanford. Just a week later in Oregon State's season finale, Harrison brought in his first touchdown as a Beaver, as he finished the day with 4 receptions for 51 yards and a touchdown. Harrison finished the year with nine receptions for 142 yards and a touchdown in two games.

==== 2021 season ====
In Week three, Harrison had a good performance against USC, where he caught four receptions for 52 yards and a touchdown, as he helped the Beavers beat USC 45–27. In Week eight, Harrison had another good performance against Utah where he brought in 3 passes for 72 yards as he helped the Beavers beat Utah. Harrison again continued to perform as two weeks later in Week ten as he caught three passes for 47 yards and a touchdown as Oregon State fell in double overtime to Colorado. Harrison would haul in two receptions for 17 yards and a touchdown in Week 12 to help the Beavers beat Arizona State 24–10. In Oregon State's bowl game Harrison had a lackluster performance, as he caught four passes for 39 yards as the Beavers fell to Utah State 24–13. Harrison finished the year with 29 receptions for 401 yards and three touchdowns.

==== 2022 season ====
Harrison opened the season strong as in Week two, Harrison brought in five receptions for 53 yards and a touchdown as he helped the Beavers beat Fresno State 35–32. In the following week Harrison would have the best game of his career as he would bring in eight passes for 133 yards and a touchdown, as he helped the Beavers destroy Montana State 68–28. In Week five, Harrison would have a good performance against Utah as he caught five passes for 96 yards as the Beavers fell to Utah. In Week six, just one week later, Harrison would have another amazing performance as he hauled in seven receptions for 104 yards and a touchdown, but that touchdown would be a 56-yard pass from quarterback Ben Gulbranson with 13 second left to put the Beavers up 28-27 and would be the game winning touchdown, as Oregon State beat Stanford 28–27. In Week 11, Harrison would have his final good performance for Oregon State as he caught eight receptions for 79 yards and a touchdown, as he would help beat California. Harrison would have his best career season finishing with 52 receptions for 604 yards and four touchdowns.

Harrison finished his collegiate career with 127 receptions for 1,502 yards and 13 touchdowns, spending two years at Florida State, and three years at Oregon State.

== Professional career ==
Pre-draft measurables
Height	Weight	Arm length	Hand span	40-yard dash	10-yard split	20-yard split	20-yard shuttle	Three-cone drill	Vertical jump	Broad jump
5 ft 11 1/4 in (1.81 m)	188 lb (85 kg)	30 3/4 in (0.78 m)	9 5/8 in (0.24 m)	4.41 s	1.58 s	2.56 s	4.41 s	6.97 s	34.0 in (0.86 m)	10 ft 3 in (3.12 m)
All values from Pro Day

=== Tennessee Titans ===
After not being selected in the 2023 NFL draft, Harrison signed with the Tennessee Titans as an undrafted free agent. He was waived on August 29, 2023, and re-signed to the practice squad. Following the end of the 2023 regular season, the Titans signed him to a reserve/future contract on January 8, 2024.

Harrison was waived/injured by the Titans on August 26, 2024.

=== Arlington Renegades ===
On March 13, 2025, Harrison signed with the Arlington Renegades of the United Football League (UFL). He was released on March 20, 2025.

=== Hamilton Tiger-Cats ===
On May 2, 2025, Harrison signed with the Hamilton Tiger-Cats. However, he was part of the final cuts on June 1, 2025.
