= Tyjon Lindsey =

American football player (born 1999)

Profile
- Position: Wide receiver

Personal information
- Born: January 7, 1999 (age 27); Corona, California, U.S.
- Listed height: 5 ft 8 in (1.73 m)
- Listed weight: 171 lb (78 kg)

Career information
- High school: Bishop Gorman (Las Vegas, Nevada)
- College: Nebraska (2017–2018); Oregon State (2019–2022)
- NFL draft: 2023: undrafted

Career history
- Seattle Seahawks (2023)*; Montreal Alouettes (2024–2025)
- * Offseason or practice squad member only
- Stats at Pro Football Reference
- Stats at CFL.ca

Tyjon Lindsey (born January 7, 1999) is an American professional football wide receiver. He played college football at Nebraska and Oregon State.

== Early life ==
Lindsey grew up in Corona, California and attended Bishop Gorman High School. In his high school career he hauled in 84 receptions for 2,126 yards and 31 touchdowns. He also played some defense racking up 10 tackles, four sacks, an interception, and two pass deflections. On August 22, 2016, Lindsey committed to play college football at the Ohio State. In January 2017, Lindsey decommitted from Ohio State. A few days later, Lindsey announced he would commit to play football at the University of Nebraska.

== College career ==
=== Nebraska ===
In Lindsey's first season with Nebraska in 2017, he played in ten games, making ten receptions for 76 yards. In the 2018 season, Lindsey played in four games, racking up three receptions for 22 yards. Lindsey was granted release from the team.

=== Oregon State ===
Midway through the 2018 season, Lindsey announced that he would transfer to Oregon State. Lindsey made his Oregon State debut in week one; he brought in his first career touchdown against Oklahoma State. In week six, Lindsey brought in a 53-yard touchdown, as he helped the Beavers beat UCLA. Lindsey finished the 2019 season with 18 receptions for 209 yards and two touchdowns, while also rushing for 71 yards and a touchdown. In week five of the 2020 season, Lindsey had a breakout game, bringing in three passes for 62 yards and two touchdowns, while also adding 32 yards on the ground, as Oregon State fell to Stanford 27–24. In the Beavers season finale versus Arizona State, Lindsey brought in four receptions for 46 yards and a touchdown, while also completing one pass for 46 yards. Lindsey finished the shortened 2020 season with 11 receptions for 159 yards and three touchdowns, while also going for 75 yards on the ground. Lindsey opened the 2021 season hauling in four receptions for 42 yards, rushing for ten yards and a touchdown, and completing a pass for 34 yards, but Oregon State would lose their season opener 30–21 against Purdue. In week three, Lindsey brought in one pass for 18 yards and a touchdown, as he helped the Beavers dominate Idaho 42–0. In week four, Lindsey had the best game of his career, as he caught five passes for 102 yards and two touchdowns, while also rushing for 11 yards, as he helped Oregon State beat USC at the Coliseum for the first time since 1960. Lindsey finished the 2021 season with 16 receptions for 232 yards and three touchdowns, while also rushing for 17 yards and a touchdown. Lindsey started the 2022 season hot as he caught two passes for 55 yards and a touchdown as he helped the Beavers win their season opener, against Boise State 34–17. Lindsey had another good performance in week four where he caught five passes for 44 yards, but Oregon State lost 17–14 to USC. Lindsey had another good performance in week eight, as he brought in four receptions for 45 yards, as the Beavers beat Colorado 42–9. In week twelve, Lindsey brought in four receptions for 42 yards, while also rushing for 13 yards, as Oregon State would beat Arizona State 31–7. In the Beavers 2022 Las Vegas Bowl, Lindsey made two receptions for seven yards, as well as eight rushing yards and a touchdown, as Lindsey would help the Beavers win 30–3 against Florida. Lindsey finished the 2022 season with 30 receptions for 317 yards and one touchdown, while also rushing for 21 yards and a touchdown.

Lindsey finished his career with 90 receptions for 1,015 yards and nine touchdowns, while rushing for 197 yards and three touchdowns and completing four of his five passing attempts for 115 yards and a touchdown.

== Professional career ==
Pre-draft measurables
Height	Weight	Arm length	Hand span	40-yard dash	10-yard split	20-yard split	20-yard shuttle	Three-cone drill	Vertical jump	Broad jump	Bench press
5 ft 8 in (1.73 m)	171 lb (78 kg)	29 7/8 in (0.76 m)	8 3/4 in (0.22 m)	4.47 s	1.51 s	2.55 s	4.10 s	6.69 s	39.0 in (0.99 m)	10 ft 8 in (3.25 m)	13 reps
All values from Pro Day

=== Seattle Seahawks ===
After not being selected in the 2023 NFL draft, Lindsey signed with the Seattle Seahawks as an undrafted free agent. He was waived on August 28, 2023 and re-signed to the practice squad on September 20. Lindsey was released on November 8.

=== Montreal Alouettes ===
Lindsey signed with the Montreal Alouettes of the Canadian Football League (CFL) on February 1, 2024. He played in the final game of the regular season where he had one catch for 39 yards. He was with the team in training camp in 2025, but was part of the final cuts on May 31, 2025. He was signed back on the team on July 28. Lindsey was released on September 2, 2025.
