= Chance Nolan =

American football & baseball player (born 1999)

Glacier Range Riders
- Pitcher
- Born: September 7, 1999 (age 27); Menifee, California, U.S.
- Bats: Right Throws: Right

Chance Joseph Nolan (born September 7, 1999) is an American former football quarterback and current professional baseball pitcher for the Glacier Range Riders of the Pioneer League. He played college football for Middle Tennessee, Saddleback College, and Oregon State, and college baseball for Morningside.

== Early life ==
Nolan attended Paloma Valley High School. In Nolan's high school career he completed 541 of his 820 passes for 9,024 yards and 104 touchdowns to 17 interceptions. He also rushed for 854 yards and four touchdowns. Nolan committed to play college football at Middle Tennessee.

== College career ==
Chance Nolan
Profile
- Position: Quarterback

Personal information
- Born: September 7, 1999 (age 27); Menifee, California, U.S.
- Listed height: 6 ft 3 in (1.91 m)
- Listed weight: 209 lb (95 kg)

Career information
- High school: Paloma Valley (CA)
- College: Middle Tennessee (2018); Saddleback (2019); Oregon State (2020–2022)
- Stats at ESPN

=== Middle Tennessee ===
Nolan redshirted his first year at Middle Tennessee.

=== Saddleback College ===
After one year at Middle Tennessee, Nolan transferred to Saddleback College. In his one year with Saddleback he completed 66 percent of his passes for 3,315 yards and rushed for 1,069 yards while finishing with 45 total touchdowns.

=== Oregon State ===
Nolan committed to Oregon State, over schools like Utah. Nolan received his first snap for the Beavers after quarterback Tristan Gebbia was injured against rival Oregon. On his first play the Beavers were down 38–34 at the one yard line, and Nolan ran a quarterback sneak to score on a one-yard touchdown giving Oregon State the lead with 33 second left, and Oregon State would hold on to win 41–38. Nolan got his first start the next week, where he completed 20 of 38 passes for 202 yards and one touchdown, additionally totaling 36 rushing yards, but the Beavers lost to Utah 30–24. Nolan started the next week against Stanford, where he completed 17 of 30 passes for 221 yards and three touchdowns, but a late-game fumble at the Stanford 25-yard line by Nolan cost Oregon State the game as the lost 27–24. In the Beavers season finale, Nolan completed nine of his 23 passes for 114 yards and two touchdowns, to one interception, as Oregon State lost 46–33 against Arizona State. Nolan finished the year completing 46 of 91 passes for 537 yards and six touchdowns to two interceptions, while adding 147 yards on the ground and one touchdown.

Nolan opened the season as the backup quarterback but replaced starter Sam Noyer in week one. He completed 10 of his 16 passes for 157 yards, but the Beavers lost to Purdue 30–24. Nolan got the start in week two against Hawaii and completed 21 of 29 passes for 302 yards and two touchdown, getting a 45–27 win over Hawaii. In week three, Nolan went 14 for 19 for 175 yards and three touchdowns, as Oregon State shutout Idaho 42–0. In week four, Nolan completed 15 of 19 passes for 215 yards and four touchdowns, with two interceptions, as the Beavers beat USC at the coliseum for the first time since 1960. In week five, Nolan struggled, going seven for 15 for 48 yards and an interception, but Oregon State won 27–24 over Washington. In week six, Nolan again struggled, completing 11 of his 25 passes for 158 yards and two interceptions, as the Beavers fell to Washington State 31–24. Nolan bounced back in week eight, going 14 of 19 for 208 yards and two touchdowns, as Oregon State would beat Utah 42–34. The following game in week nine, Nolan had a subpar performance completing 15 of his 26 passes for 243 yards and two touchdowns with two interceptions, as the Beavers would lose 39–25 against California. In week ten, Nolan completed 20 for 38 passes for 255 yards and a touchdown with one interception, but Oregon State lost in double overtime against Colorado. In week eleven, Nolan had a great performance, going 19 for 25 on his passing attempts for 257 yards and two touchdowns, while also adding a score on the ground, as the Beavers won 35–14 against Stanford and become bowl eligible for the first time since the 2013 season. In week twelve, Nolan completed 12 of his 18 passes for 90 yards and a touchdown, while also rushing for a touchdown on the ground, as he helped Oregon State beat Arizona State 24–10. In Oregon State's season finale against their rival Oregon, Nolan had a good performance throwing for 308 yards and two touchdowns, with one interception, while also adding a rushing touchdown, but it would not be enough, as the Beavers would fall to Oregon, 38–29. In the 2021 LA Bowl, Nolan completed 21 of his 30 passes for 263 yards and an interception, as Oregon State lost 24–13 against Utah State. Nolan finished the 2021 season completing 204 of his 318 passing attempts for 2,677 yards, and 19 touchdowns to 10 interceptions. He also added 286 rushing yards and three touchdowns. For his performance on the year he was named first team all Pac-12 by Pro Football Focus, and an honorable mention all Pac-12 member by the players and coaches.

Nolan was named to the Johnny Unitas Golden Arm Award Watch List during the 2022 preseason. Nolan opened up the 2022 season with a good performance, completing 14 of his 23 passes for 251 yards and two touchdowns with two interceptions, leading the Beavers to a win their opening game 34–17 against Boise State. In week two, Nolan again had a good performance going 14 for 27 on his passing attempts for 219 yards and a touchdown, to help Oregon State win again, beating Fresno State 35–32. In week three, Nolan would have one of the best performances of his career throwing for 276 yards and four touchdowns, while also adding a rushing touchdown, as he helped the Beavers dominate Montana State 68–28. Nolan struggled in week four, completing 17 of his 29 passes for 167 yards and four interceptions, as Oregon State lost versus USC 17–14. Nolan again struggled in week five completing two of his seven passing attempts for 26 yards and two interceptions. Nolan exited the game in the first quarter as the Beavers went on to lose 42–16 against Utah. Nolan missed the team's next game against Stanford with a neck injury. Nolan did not play in any more of the team's games as backup quarterback Ben Gulbranson took over as the starter. Nolan finished the 2022 season completing 66 of his 111 passes for 939 yards and seven touchdowns to eight interceptions, while also rushing for 75 yards and a touchdown. After the conclusion of the 2022 season Nolan announced that he had entered the transfer portal. Nolan finished his career at Oregon State completing 316 of his 520 passes for 4,153 yards and 32 touchdowns to 20 interceptions, while also adding 508 rushing yards and five touchdowns.

=== TCU ===
On April 25, 2023, Nolan announced that he had decided to transfer to TCU where he was expected to compete for the starting job in 2023. However, Nolan left the team before the end of fall camp, never suiting up for the Horned Frogs.

== Baseball career ==
=== New York Yankees ===
On January 28, 2025, Nolan signed a minor league contract with the New York Yankees as a pitcher. He made 16 appearances for the rookie-level Florida Complex League Yankees, posting a 1-1 record and 1.50 ERA with 12 strikeouts over 18 innings of work. On March 22, 2026, Nolan was released by the Yankees organization.

=== Glacier Range Riders ===
On March 25, 2026, Nolan signed with the Glacier Range Riders of the Pioneer League. On May 15, he was placed on the 60-day injured list.
