= Jonathan Smith (American football coach) =

American football player and coach (born 1979)

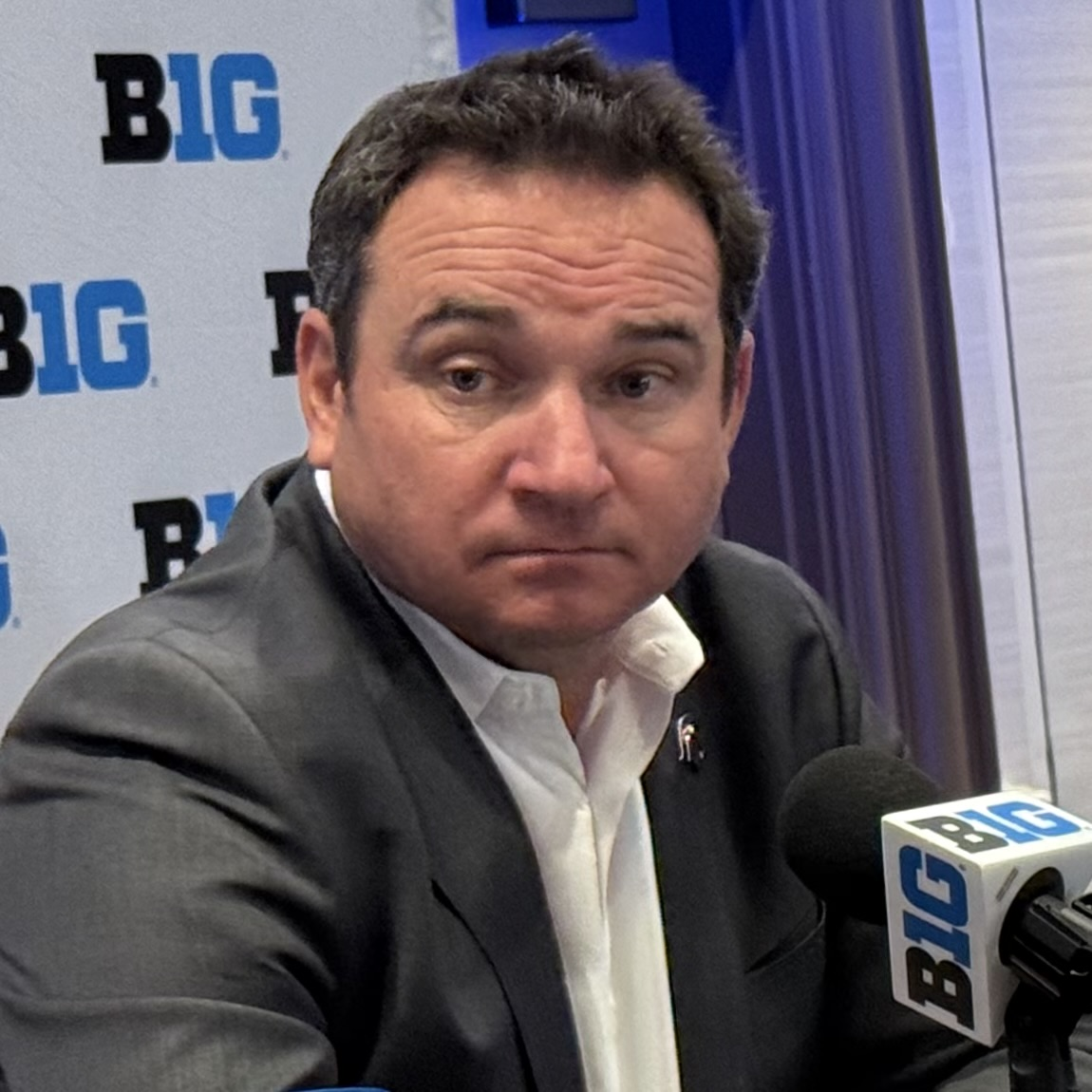
- Smith at 2025 Big Ten Media Days

Biographical details
- Born: January 18, 1979 (age 47); Pasadena, California, U.S.

Playing career
- 1998–2001: Oregon State
- Position: Quarterback

Coaching career (HC unless noted)
- 2002–2003: Oregon State (GA)
- 2004–2009: Idaho (QB)
- 2010–2011: Montana (OC/QB)
- 2012–2013: Boise State (QB)
- 2014–2017: Washington (OC/QB)
- 2018–2023: Oregon State
- 2024–2025: Michigan State

Head coaching record
- Overall: 43–50
- Bowls: 1–2

Accomplishments and honors

Awards
- Co-Pac-12 Coach of the Year (2022)

Jonathan Charles Smith (born January 18, 1979) is an American college football coach. He was most recently the head football coach at Michigan State University, serving from 2024 to 2025. He was previously the head football coach for six seasons, from 2018 to 2023, at his alma mater, Oregon State University. As a player, Smith was a four-year starter at quarterback for the Oregon State Beavers under head coaches Mike Riley and Dennis Erickson.

== Early years ==
Born in Pasadena, California, Smith graduated from Glendora High School in east Los Angeles County in 1997. He went north to play college football at Oregon State, and was originally a walk-on under head coach Mike Riley.

Smith was a four-year starter for the Beavers at quarterback, taking over midway through his redshirt freshman season in 1998 and maintaining the job through his senior season in 2001. As a junior in 2000 under Dennis Erickson, he led the Beavers to their greatest season in school history. The Beavers finished 11–1, a school record for wins, and won a share of their first conference title in 36 years, and finished the season ranked fourth in the country. His wide receivers on the team included future NFL players Chad Johnson and T. J. Houshmandzadeh. Smith was the MVP of the Fiesta Bowl.

=== College statistics ===
			Passing						Rushing	
Year	Team	GP	Cmp	Att	Pct	Yds	TD	Int	Yds	TD
1998	Oregon State	6	81	181	44.8	1,427	6	5	-56	0
1999	Oregon State	12	207	425	48.7	3,053	15	7	-96	3
2000	Oregon State	12	170	338	50.3	2,773	20	7	-165	0
2001	Oregon State	11	180	317	56.8	2,427	14	10	-141	1
College totals		41	638	1,261	50.6	9,680	55	29	-458	4

== Coaching career ==
=== Assistant coach ===
Smith was a graduate assistant at his alma mater in 2002 and 2003 under Erickson and Riley. He was the quarterbacks coach for six seasons (2004–2009) at the University of Idaho under three head coaches: Nick Holt, Erickson, and Robb Akey, then the offensive coordinator for two seasons at the University of Montana. Smith was the quarterbacks coach for two seasons at Boise State University under Chris Petersen, then went with him to the University of Washington and stayed for four seasons.

=== Oregon State ===
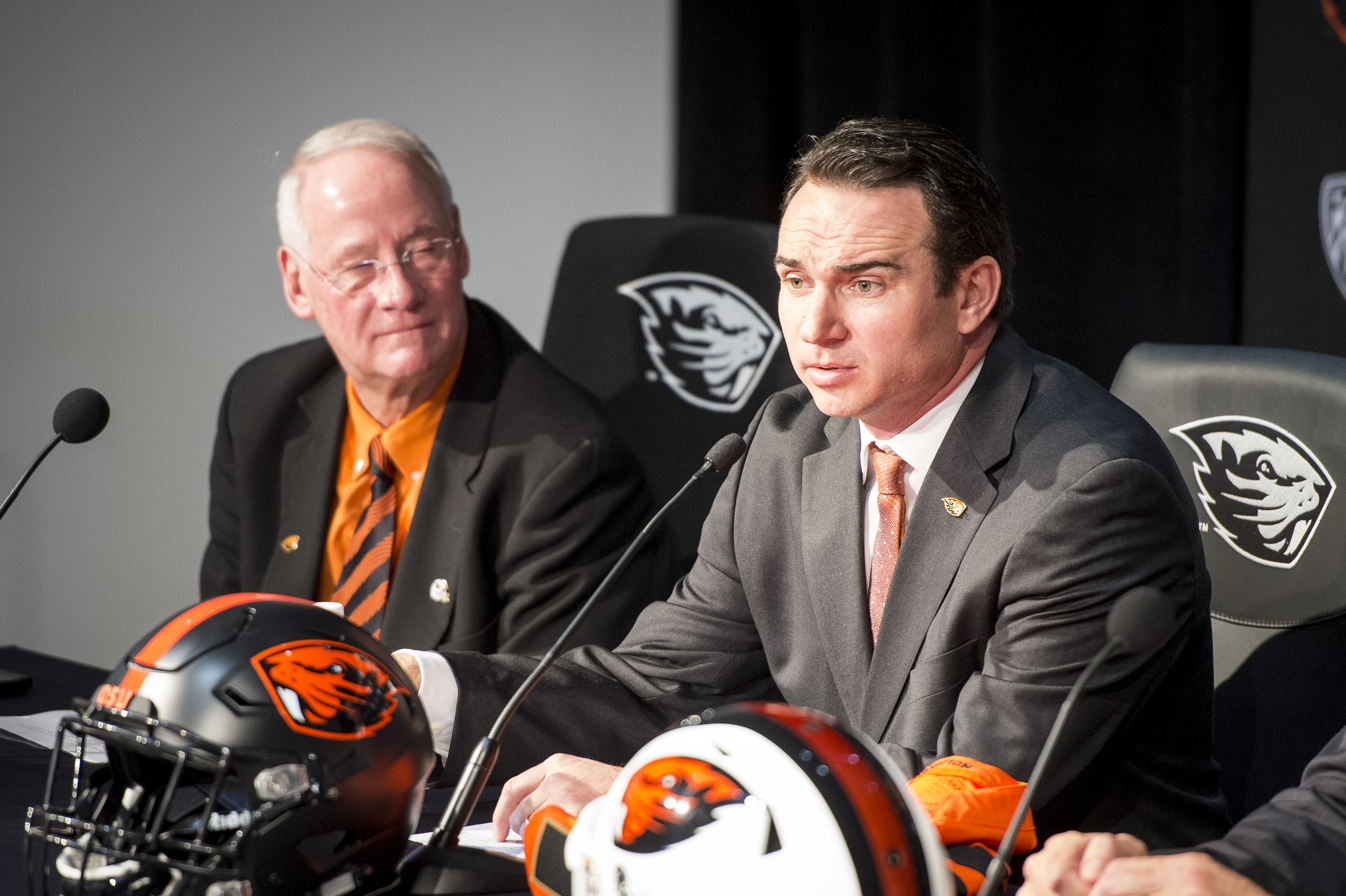
Smith at a press conference with University President Edward J. Ray soon after being hired as Oregon State's head coach in 2017.

Smith was named Oregon State's head coach on November 29, 2017. He took the reins of his alma mater in a tumultuous period after Gary Andersen quit on October 9, six games in to his third season. Oregon State was 12–36 (.250) in the four seasons before Smith's arrival.

Smith broke through in his fourth season in 2021, posting his first winning record at 7–6 and receiving an invite to the LA Bowl. The Beavers improved in 2022, posting the third ten-win season in program history after soundly defeating Florida 30–3 in the Las Vegas Bowl.

Smith's initial five-year deal in 2017 paid him $1.9 million annually and automatically extended by one year after every six-win season. On January 7, 2020, Smith received a three-year extension through the 2025 season. After his first winning season in 2021, Smith's contract was rewritten, keeping him signed through the 2027 season and calling for him to make $3.25 million beginning in the 2022 season. After a historic season for the program in 2022, including a win over rival Oregon, Smith received a new deal with another significant pay increase; the new six-year deal raised his salary to $4.85 million beginning in 2023. Smith's new deal reportedly placed him at fifth in the Pac-12 in compensation, including ahead of his in-state counterpart Dan Lanning.

=== Michigan State ===
Smith was officially named Michigan State's head coach on November 25, 2023. The position had been vacant since late September, after Mel Tucker's employment was terminated. On November 30, 2025, Michigan State fired Smith, after going 4–15 over his two years with the program.

== Head coaching record ==
=== College ===
Year	Team	Overall	Conference	Standing	Bowl/playoffs	Coaches^{#}	AP^{°}
Oregon State Beavers (Pac-12 Conference) (2018–2023)
2018	Oregon State	2–10	1–8	6th (North)			
2019	Oregon State	5–7	4–5	T–2nd (North)			
2020	Oregon State	2–5	2–5	4th (North)			
2021	Oregon State	7–6	5–4	3rd (North)	L LA		
2022	Oregon State	10–3	6–3	T–5th	W Las Vegas	17	17
2023	Oregon State	8–4	5–4	T–4th	L Sun (Note: Smith left for Michigan State before Oregon State's bowl game)		
Oregon State:		34–35	23–29				
Michigan State Spartans (Big Ten Conference) (2024–2025)
2024	Michigan State	0–7 (Note: 5 wins (3 conference wins) were vacated as a result of an NCAA settlement over recruiting violations during Mel Tucker's tenure.)	0–6	17th			
2025	Michigan State	4–8	1–8	T–16th			
Michigan State:		4–15	1–14				
Total:		38–49					
