= Jack Velling =

American football player (born 2003)

Profile
- Position: Tight end

Personal information
- Born: October 29, 2003 (age 23); Seattle, Washington, U.S.
- Listed height: 6 ft 4 in (1.93 m)
- Listed weight: 242 lb (110 kg)

Career information
- High school: Seattle Prep (Washington)
- College: Oregon State (2022–2023); Michigan State (2024–2025)
- NFL draft: 2026: undrafted

Career history
- Atlanta Falcons (2026)*
- * Offseason or practice squad member only

Awards and highlights
- Second-team All-Pac-12 (2023); Third-team All-Big Ten (2025)
- Stats at Pro Football Reference

Jack Velling (born October 29, 2003) is an American professional football tight end. He played college football for the Michigan State Spartans and Oregon State Beavers, and was signed by the Atlanta Falcons as an undrafted free agent in 2026.

== Early life ==
Velling attended Seattle Prep School in Seattle, Washington. As a senior, he brought in 57 catches for 838 yards and four touchdowns. Velling committed to play college football at Oregon State over other schools such as Arizona, Fresno State, Michigan, Minnesota, and Utah.

== College career ==
=== Oregon State ===
Velling made his collegiate debut in week 3 against Montana State, where he caught one pass for seven yards. In week 7 against Washington State, he hauled in four receptions for 63 yards. In week 8, Velling hauled in his first career touchdown on a 60-yard catch against Colorado. In a week 11 matchup against California, he recorded two receptions for 15 yards and a touchdown, as he helped the Beavers win 38–10. A week later, Velling caught three passes for 74 yards and a touchdown in a 31–7 win over Arizona State. In Oregon State's bowl game, he made two receptions for 21 yards in a 30–3 win over Florida. Velling finished the year with 16 receptions for 281 yards and three touchdowns, earning Freshman All-American honorable mention accolades from College Football News.

On December 6, 2023, Velling announced that he would be entering the transfer portal.

=== Michigan State ===
On December 18, 2023, Velling announced that he would be transferring to Michigan State.

== Professional career ==
Pre-draft measurables
| Height | Weight | Arm length | Hand span | Wingspan | 40-yard dash | 10-yard split | 20-yard split | 20-yard shuttle | Three-cone drill | Vertical jump | Broad jump |
|---|---|---|---|---|---|---|---|---|---|---|---|
| 6 ft 3 5/8 in (1.92 m) | 242 lb (110 kg) | 32 in (0.81 m) | 9 1/4 in (0.23 m) | 6 ft 4 7/8 in (1.95 m) | 4.88 s | 1.75 s | 2.88 s | 4.64 s | 7.19 s | 31.5 in (0.80 m) | 9 ft 7 in (2.92 m) |
All values from Pro Day

Velling was signed as an undrafted free agent by the Atlanta Falcons after the conclusion of the 2026 NFL draft. On August 30, 2026, Velling was waived by the Falcons as a part of final roster cuts; he was re-signed to the team's practice squad the next day. He was released on October 26.
