= Ben Gulbranson =

American football player

No. 15
- Position: Quarterback

Personal information
- Born: Mesa, Arizona, U.S.
- Listed height: 6 ft 3 in (1.91 m)
- Listed weight: 215 lb (98 kg)

Career information
- High school: Newbury Park (Newbury Park, California)
- College: Oregon State (2020–2024); Stanford (2025)

Awards and highlights
- Las Vegas Bowl MVP (2022)
- Stats at ESPN

Ben Gulbranson is an American former college football quarterback for the Oregon State Beavers and Stanford Cardinal.

== Early life ==
Gulbranson was born in Mesa, Arizona, and attended Newbury Park High School in Newbury Park, California. In his high school career, he completed 252 of 453 passes for 3,710 yards and 37 touchdowns to 18 interceptions and rushed for 95 yards and four touchdowns. Gulbranson committed to play college football at Oregon State over other schools such as Arizona State, California, and Kansas State.

== College career ==
=== Oregon State ===
Gulbranson made his collegiate debut in the 2020 season finale against Arizona State, where he completed six of nine passes for 64 yards and a touchdown on the final play of the game to Zeriah Beason. Gulbranson took a redshirt in 2021.

In week 5 of the 2022 season, Gulbranson played the final three quarters after replacing injured starter Chance Nolan, completing 12 of 20 passes for 177 yards and two interceptions in a loss to #12 Utah. He made his first career start the following week against Stanford, where he completed 20 of 28 passes for 250 yards and two touchdowns including the game-winning 56-yard touchdown pass to Tre’Shaun Harrison with 13 seconds left to help the Beavers beat Stanford 28–27 after being down 24–10. Gulbranson again got the start the following week against Washington State where he completed 12 of 24 passes for 141 yards and a touchdown with one interception in a 24–10 win to help the Beavers achieve bowl eligibility. The following week, Gulbranson went 14 for 22 for 202 yards and two touchdowns, including a 60-yard touchdown to tight end Jack Velling, in a 42–9 win over Colorado. In Gulbranson's next start he struggled, completing 12 of 19 passes for 87 yards as the Beavers fell to Washington 24–21. The next week, Gulbranson went 15 for 23 for 137 yards and two touchdowns, as well as a rushing touchdown, in a 38–10 win over California. The following week, Gulbranson led his team to a 31–7 win over Arizona State, where he completed 15 of 21 passing attempts for 188 yards and a touchdown, adding an eight-yard rushing touchdown. In the season finale and rivalry game versus #9 Oregon, Gulbranson completed just six of his 13 passes for 60 yards and two interceptions, but added two touchdowns on the ground as Oregon State rallied down 21 to beat Oregon 38–34. In the 2022 Las Vegas Bowl against Florida, Gulbranson completed 12 of his 19 passes for 165 yards and a touchdown while also adding a rushing touchdown to beat Florida 30–3 and help the Beavers to just their third 10-win season. For his performance, he was named the Las Vegas Bowl MVP. Gulbranson finished the year completing 121 of his 194 passes for 1,455 yards and nine touchdowns to five interceptions while also rushing for 52 yards and five touchdowns. Gulbranson finished the 2022 season with a 7–1 record. He lost the 2023 season starting quarterback job to Clemson transfer DJ Uiagalelei in camp.

On April 25, 2025, Gulbranson entered the transfer portal.

=== Stanford ===
On April 29, 2025, Gulbranson transferred to Stanford.

=== Statistics ===
Season	Team	Games			Passing								Rushing			
Season	Team	GP	GS	Record	Cmp	Att	Pct	Yds	Y/A	TD	Int	Rtg	Att	Yds	Avg	TD
2020	Oregon State	1	0	—	6	9	66.7	64	7.1	1	0	163.1	0	0	0.0	0
2021	Oregon State	Redshirt (redshirt)														
2022	Oregon State	10	8	7–1	121	194	62.4	1,455	7.5	9	5	135.5	40	52	1.3	5
2023	Oregon State	2	1	0–1	17	28	60.7	186	6.6	1	1	121.2	5	−12	−2.4	0
2024	Oregon State	5	3	1–2	78	128	60.9	943	7.4	4	4	126.9	14	−7	−0.5	1
2025	Stanford	9	9	3–6	148	260	56.9	1,813	7.0	9	10	119.2	33	−201	−6.1	0
Career		27	21	8–6	370	619	59.8	4,461	7.2	24	20	126.6	92	-168	-1.8	6
