= 2022 California Golden Bears football team =

American college football season

2022 California Golden Bears football
- Conference: Pac-12 Conference
- Record: 4–8 (2–7 Pac-12)
- Head coach: Justin Wilcox (6th season)
- Offensive coordinator: Bill Musgrave (3rd season; first ten games)
- Offensive scheme: Spread option
- Defensive coordinator: Peter Sirmon (3rd season)
- Base defense: 2–4–5
- Home stadium: California Memorial Stadium

2022 Pac-12 Conference football standings
	Conf.			Overall
Team	W		L	W		L
No. 12 USC y	8	–	1	11	–	3
No. 10 Utah y$	7	–	2	10	–	4
No. 8 Washington	7	–	2	11	–	2
No. 15 Oregon	7	–	2	10	–	3
No. 17 Oregon State	6	–	3	10	–	3
No. 21 UCLA	6	–	3	9	–	4
Washington State	4	–	5	7	–	6
Arizona	3	–	6	5	–	7
California	2	–	7	4	–	8
Arizona State†	2	–	7	3	–	9
Stanford	1	–	8	3	–	9
Colorado	1	–	8	1	–	11
Championship: Utah 47, USC 24
$ – Conference champion; y – Championship game participant; Rankings from AP Poll

The 2022 California Golden Bears football team represented the University of California, Berkeley during the 2022 NCAA Division I FBS football season. The team is led by head coach Justin Wilcox, in his sixth year. The team plays their home games at California Memorial Stadium as a member of the Pac-12 Conference.

== Schedule ==
Date	Time	Opponent	Site	TV	Result	Attendance
September 3	1:00 p.m.	No. 25 (FCS) UC Davis*	California Memorial Stadium; Berkeley, CA	P12N	W 34–13	34,984
September 10	1:00 p.m.	UNLV*	California Memorial Stadium; Berkeley, CA	P12N	W 20–14	38,180
September 17	11:30 a.m.	at Notre Dame*	Notre Dame Stadium; Notre Dame, IN	NBC	L 17–24	77,622
September 24	2:30 p.m.	Arizona^{†}	California Memorial Stadium; Berkeley, CA	P12N	W 49–31	37,216
October 1	2:30 p.m.	at Washington State	Martin Stadium; Pullman, WA	P12N	L 9–28	23,021
October 15	11:00 a.m.	at Colorado	Folsom Field; Boulder, CO	P12N	L 13–20 ^{OT}	50,471
October 22	7:30 p.m.	Washington	California Memorial Stadium; Berkeley, CA	ESPN	L 21–28	34,601
October 29	12:30 p.m.	No. 8 Oregon	California Memorial Stadium; Berkeley, CA	FS1	L 24–42	37,077
November 5	7:30 p.m.	at No. 9 USC	Los Angeles Memorial Coliseum; Los Angeles, CA	ESPN	L 35–41	64,916
November 12	6:00 p.m.	at Oregon State	Reser Stadium; Corvallis, OR	P12N	L 10–38	28,642
November 19	2:30 p.m.	Stanford	California Memorial Stadium; Berkeley, CA (Big Game)	P12N	W 27–20	51,892
November 25	1:30 p.m.	No. 18 UCLA	California Memorial Stadium; Berkeley, CA (rivalry)	FOX	L 28–35	36,221
*Non-conference game; ^{†}Homecoming; Rankings from AP Poll (and CFP Rankings, after November 1) - Released prior to game; All times are in Pacific time

== Roster ==
2022 California Golden Bears football team roster
Players
Coaches
Offense

Pos.	#	Name	Class
QB	2	Kai Millner	Fr
WR	3	Jeremiah Hunter	Jr
TE	4	Jermaine Terry II	So
RB	6	Jaydn Ott	Fr
WR	7	J. Michael Sturdivant	Fr
WR	11	Mavin Anderson	Fr
QB	13	Jack Plummer	Sr
WR	14	Monroe Young	Sr
QB	15	Fernando Mendoza	Fr
QB	16	Zach Johnson	So
QB	17	Noah Mitcheom	Fr
WR	18	Mason Starling	Jr
QB	18	Tyler Jensen	Fr
WR	22	Justin Richard Baker	Jr
RB	24	Chris Street	Jr
RB	25	DeCarlos Brooks	Jr
RB	26	Ashton Hayes	Fr
RB	28	Damien Moore	Jr
WR	29	Aidan Lee	Jr
RB	31	Ashton Stredick	So
TE	34	Andy Alfieri	So
WR	36	Grant Daley	So
WR	37	Kenden Robinson Jr.	Jr
WR	39	Trond Grizzell	Fr
RB	28	Anthony Summey	So
FB	41	Champion Johnson	Fr
FB	44	Beaux Tagaloa	Jr
TE	46	Jake Muller	So
OL	54	Spencer Lovell	Sr
OL	60	Brian Driscoll	Jr
OL	62	Ben Coleman	Jr
OL	63	Brayden Rohme	Jr
OL	64	Joshua Stovall	Fr
OL	65	Dylan Jemtegaard	Fr
OL	66	Colin Hamilton	So
OL	67	Colin Moroney	So
OL	68	Trent Ramsey	Fr
OL	70	Ryan Lange	Fr
OL	71	Sioape Vatikani	Fr
OL	72	T. J. Session	Jr
OL	73	Matthew Sindric	Sr
OL	74	Dashaun Harris	Fr
OL	76	Bastian Swinney	Fr
OL	77	Everett Johnson	Jr
OL	78	Jackson Brown	Fr
OL	79	Ender Aguilar	So
WR	80	Jordan King	Fr
TE	81	Elijah Mojarro	Jr
WR	82	Mason Mangum	So
WR	83	Chris Rogers	Jr
WR	84	Jaiven Plummer	Fr
TE	85	Keleki Latu	So
TE	86	Jeffrey Johnson	Fr
TE	87	Jack Endries	Fr
TE	88	Nick Alftin	Sr
WR	89	Tommy Christakos	Jr

Defense

Pos.	#	Name	Class
S	2	Craig Woodson	Jr
S	5	Raymond Woodie III	Sr
ILB	8	Jackson Sirmon	Sr
ILB	10	Oluwafemi Oladejo	So
CB	11	Tyson McWilliams	So
S	13	Miles Williams	Jr
CB	15	Lu-Magia Hearns III	So
OLB	16	Henry Ikahihifo	Jr
DE	19	Curlee Thomas IV	Fr
CB	20	Cam Sidney	Fr
CB	21	Colin Gamble	Jr
S	23	Dejuan Butler	So
S	24	Fatu Iosefa	Fr
ILB	27	Trey Paster	Jr
CB	28	Kaleb Higgins	Fr
CB	29	Jeremiah Earby	Fr
CB	30	Mayze Bryant	Fr
S	31	Hunter Barth	Fr
S	32	Daniel Scott	Sr
OLB	33	Myles Jernigan	Jr
S	37	Julian Womack	Fr
OLB	38	Patrick Hisatake	Fr
CB	39	Evan McLurkin	So
S	40	Demetric Jackson Jr.	Sr
CB	41	Isaiah Young	Jr
ILB	42	Nate Rutchena	So
ILB	43	Malcolm McClure	Fr
OLB	44	Xavier Carlton	Jr
ILB	45	McKyle So'oto	Fr
OLB	46	Sam Ross	Fr
OLB	47	Moso'opala Tuitele	Fr
OLB	48	Orin Patu	Jr
DL	49	Darius Long Jr.	Sr
ILB	50	Kyle Smith	Jr
ILB	51	Blake Antzoulatos	Jr
OLB	52	Braxten Croteau	Sr
ILB	53	Kaleb Elarms-Orr	Fr
ILB	55	Muelu Iosefa	Jr
DE	57	Ieremia Ieremai	Fr
ILB	59	Ryan Puskas	Jr
DL	75	Jaedon Roberts	Jr
DL	90	Brett Johnson	Jr
DT	91	Ricky Correia	Jr
OLB	92	Myles Williams	Fr
DE	93	Elijah Diaz	Fr
DT	94	Gunnar Rask	Jr
DE	95	Akili Calhoun	Fr
DE	96	Derek Wilkins	Fr
OLB	97	Odua Isibor	Sr
DE	98	Nate Burrell	Fr
DE	99	Ethan Saunders	Jr

Special teams

Pos.	#	Name	Class
P	17	Jamieson Sheahan	Sr
K	30	Dario Longhetto	Sr
P	34	Ethan Baxter	Fr
K	38	Michael Luckhurst	Fr
LS	45	Slater Zellers	Sr

Head coach

- Justin Wilcox

Coordinators/assistant coaches

- Bill Musgrave – Offensive coordinator/quarterbacks (first 10 games)
- Peter Sirmon – Defensive coordinator/inside linebackers
- Terrence Brown – Defensive backs
- Andrew Browning – Defensive line
- Geep Chryst – Tight end
- Angus McClure – Offensive line (first 10 games)
- Vic So'oto – Outside linebackers
- Aristotle Thompson – Running backs
- Burl Toler III – Wide receivers/recruiting coordinator
- Tre Watson – Defensive backs
- Brian Johnson – Director, athletic performance

Legend

- (C) Team captain
- (S) Suspended
- (I) Ineligible
- Injured
- Redshirt

Roster
Last update: 10/30/22

== Game summaries ==
=== vs UC Davis ===
UC Davis Aggies (0–0) vs California Golden Bears (0–0) – Game summary

Quarter	1	2	3	4	Total
No. 25 (FCS) Aggies	7	0	6	0	13
Golden Bears	0	17	10	7	34

at California Memorial Stadium • Berkeley, CA

- Date: September 3, 2022
- Game time: 1:07 p.m.
- Game weather: Sunny, 76 °F (24 °C)
- Game attendance: 34,984
- Referee: Michael Mothershed
- TV announcers (Pac-12 Network): Guy Haberman (play-by-play), Shane Vereen (analyst)

Game information

First quarter

- (3:09) UCD – Chaz Davis 4-yard pass from Miles Hastings, Isaiah Gomez kick (Drive: 14 plays, 53 yards, 5:39; UCD 7–0)

Second quarter

- (8:54) CAL – Jeremiah Hunter 3-yard pass from Jack Plummer, Dario Longhetto kick (Drive: 8 plays, 53 yards, 3:26; Tied 7–7)
- (2:25) CAL – Jaydn Ott 8-yard pass from Jack Plummer, Dario Longhetto kick (Drive: 10 plays, 87 yards, 4:08; California 14–7)
- (0:00) CAL – Dario Longhetto 32-yard field goal (Drive: 5 plays, 52 yards, 0:36; California 17–7)

Third quarter

- (14:20) CAL – Craig Woodson 39-yard interception return, Dario Longhetto kick (Drive: 2 plays, 5 yards, 0:40; California 24–7)
- (14:04) UCD – Ulonzo Gilliam Jr. 60-yard run (Drive: 1 plays, 60 yards, 0:10; California 24–13)
- (7:02) CAL – Dario Longhetto 41-yard field goal (Drive: 15 plays, 59 yards, 6:57; California 27–13)

Fourth quarter

- (7:19) CAL – Mavin Anderson 14-yard pass from Jack Plummer, Dario Longhetto kick (Drive: 5 plays, 58 yards, 1:37; California 34–13)

Statistics	UCD	CAL
First downs	19	24
Total yards	387	415
Rushes/yards	27–145	34–147
Passing yards	242	262
Passing: Comp–Att–Int	32–50–2	23–35–1
Time of possession	30:01	29:59

Team	Category	Player	Statistics
UC Davis	Passing	Miles Hastings	32/50, 242 yards, TD, 2 int
UC Davis	Rushing	Ulonzo Gilliam Jr.	14 carries, 115 yards, TD
UC Davis	Receiving	Chaz Davis	5 receptions, 53 yards, TD
California	Passing	Jack Plummer	23/35, 268 yards, 3 TD, int
California	Rushing	Jaydn Ott	17 carries, 104 yards
California	Receiving	Jeremiah Hunter	6 receptions, 78 yards

=== vs UNLV ===
UNLV Rebels (1–0) vs California Golden Bears (1–0) – Game summary

Quarter	1	2	3	4	Total
Rebels	0	7	7	0	14
Golden Bears	14	3	3	0	20

at California Memorial Stadium • Berkeley, CA

- Date: September 10, 2022
- Game time: 1:07 p.m.
- Game weather: Sloudy, 68 °F (20 °C)
- Game attendance: 38,180
- Referee: Francisco Villar
- TV announcers (Pac-12 Network): Guy Haberman (play-by-play), Shane Vereen (analyst)

Game information

First quarter

- (11:08) CAL – Jaydn Ott 2-yard run, Dario Longhetto kick (Drive: 6 plays, 55 yards, 3:02; California 7–0)
- (3:52) CAL – Jaydn Ott 12-yard pass from Jack Plummer, Dario Longhetto kick (Drive: 10 plays, 80 yards, 5:58; California 14–0)

Second quarter

- (14:55) UNLV – Kyle Williams 11-yard pass from Doug Brumfield, Daniel Gutierrez kick (Drive: 9 plays, 75 yards, 3:57; California 14–7)
- (1:58) CAL – Dario Longhetto 21-yard field goal (Drive: 8 plays, 65 yards, 4:22; California 17–7)

Third quarter

- (8:21) CAL – Dario Longhetto 30-yard field goal (Drive: 14 plays, 67 yards, 6:34; California 20–7)
- (7:04) UNLV – Aidan Robbins 31-yard run, Daniel Gutierrez kick (Drive: 4 plays, 75 yards, 1:17; California 20–14)

Fourth quarter

None

Statistics	UNLV	CAL
First downs	17	25
Total yards	309	370
Rushes/yards	31–103	32–92
Passing yards	206	278
Passing: Comp–Att–Int	18–33–1	28–39–1
Time of possession	24:24	35:36

Team	Category	Player	Statistics
UNLV	Passing	Doug Brumfield	18/33, 206 yards, TD, int
UNLV	Rushing	Aidan Robbins	14 carries, 84 yards, TD
UNLV	Receiving	Ricky White	4 receptions, 59 yards
California	Passing	Jack Plummer	28/39, 278 yards, TD, int
California	Rushing	Jaydn Ott	7 carries, 52 yards, TD
California	Receiving	Jeremiah Hunter	5 receptions, 79 yards

=== at Notre Dame ===
California Golden Bears (2–0) at Notre Dame Fighting Irish (0–2) – Game summary

Quarter	1	2	3	4	Total
Golden Bears	0	10	7	0	17
Fighting Irish	0	7	7	10	24

at Notre Dame Stadium • Notre Dame, IN

- Date: September 17, 2022
- Game time: 5:30 p.m. CST
- Game weather: Sunny, 83 °F (28 °C)
- Game attendance: 77,622
- Referee: Mike Roche
- TV announcers (NBC): Jac Collinsworth (play-by-play), Jason Garrett (analyst), Zora Stephenson (sideline)

Game information

First quarter

None

Second quarter

- (14:27) CAL – J. Michael Sturdivant 18-yard pass from Jack Plummer, Dario Longhetto kick (Drive: 4 plays, 33 yards, 0:26; California 7–0)
- (8:54) ND – Chris Tyree 21-yard pass from Drew Pyne, Blake Grupe kick (Drive: 10 plays, 60 yards, 5:28; Tied 7–7)
- (4:11) CAL – Dario Longhetto 34-yard field goal (Drive: 10 plays, 69 yards, 4:43; California 10–7)

Third quarter

- (9:14) ND – Audric Estimé 1-yard run, Blake Grupe kick (Drive: 9 plays, 60 yards, 4:00; Notre Dame 14–10)
- (4:48) CAL – Jack Plummer 1-yard run, Dario Longhetto kick (Drive: 10 plays, 75 yards, 4:26; California 17–14)

Fourth quarter

- (14:48) ND – Blake Grupe 47-yard field goal (Drive: 10 plays, 46 yards, 5:00; Notre Dame 17–17)
- (9:16) ND – Michael Mayer 6-yard pass from Drew Pyne, Blake Grupe kick (Drive: 7 plays, 66 yards, 3:46; Notre Dame 24–17)

Statistics	CAL	ND
First downs	18	17
Total yards	296	297
Rushes/yards	31–112	41–147
Passing yards	184	150
Passing: Comp–Att–Int	16–37–0	17–23–0
Time of possession	26:58	33:02

Team	Category	Player	Statistics
California	Passing	Jack Plummer	16/37, 184 yards, TD
California	Rushing	DeCarlos Brooks	5 carries, 43 yards
California	Receiving	Jeremiah Hunter	5 receptions, 66 yards
Notre Dame	Passing	Drew Pyne	17/23, 150 yards, 2 TD
Notre Dame	Rushing	Audric Estimé	18 carries, 75 yards, TD
Notre Dame	Receiving	Chris Tyree	5 receptions, 44 yards, TD

=== vs Arizona ===
Arizona Wildcats (2–1) vs California Golden Bears (2–1) – Game summary

Quarter	1	2	3	4	Total
Wildcats	14	10	0	7	31
Golden Bears	7	14	14	14	49

at California Memorial Stadium • Berkeley, CA

- Date: September 24, 2022
- Game time: 2:37 p.m.
- Game weather: Sunny, 80 °F (27 °C)
- Game attendance: 37,216
- Referee: Mark Duddy
- TV announcers (Pac-12 Network): J. B. Long (play-by-play), Max Browne (analyst)

Game information

First quarter

- (14:17) CAL – Jaydn Ott 73-yard run, Dario Longhetto kick (Drive: 7 plays, 75 yards, 0:43; California 7–7)
- (11:16) UA – Jonah Coleman 1-yard run, Tyler Loop kick (Drive: 8 plays, 75 yards, 3:01; Tied 7–7)
- (5:28) UA – Michael Wiley 1-yard run, Tyler Loop kick (Drive: 9 plays, 92 yards, 4:23; Arizona 14–7)

Second quarter

- (11:56) CAL – J. Michael Sturdivant 16-yard pass from Jack Plummer, Dario Longhetto kick (Drive: 8 plays, 80 yards, 3:22; Tied 14–14)
- (10:00) UA – Tetairoa McMillan 24-yard pass from Jayden de Laura, Tyler Loop kick (Drive: 6 plays, 75 yards, 1:56; Arizona 21–14)
- (3:40) CAL – DeCarlos Brooks 3-yard run, Dario Longhetto kick (Drive: 13 plays, 82 yards, 6:16; Tied 21–21)
- (0:40) UA – Tyler Loop 37-yard field goal (Drive: 10 plays, 41 yards, 2:53; Arizona 24–21)

Third quarter

- (9:17) CAL – Keleki Latu 3-yard pass from Jack Plummer, Dario Longhetto kick (Drive: 8 plays, 87 yards, 4:03; California 28–24)
- (4:59) CAL – Jaydn Ott 18-yard run, Dario Longhetto kick (Drive: 5 plays, 58 yards, 2:14; California 35–24)

Fourth quarter

- (14:53) CAL – Jeremiah Hunter 37-yard pass from Jack Plummer, Dario Longhetto kick (Drive: 6 plays, 71 yards, 2:53; California 42–24)
- (12:36) UA – Jacob Cowing 14-yard pass from Jayden de Laura, Tyler Loop kick (Drive: 6 plays, 75 yards, 2:17; California 42–31)
- (4:56) CAL – Jaydn Ott 72-yard run, Dario Longhetto kick (Drive: 2 plays, 75 yards, 0:55; California 49–31)

Statistics	ARIZ	CAL
First downs	31	27
Total yards	536	599
Rushes/yards	26–135	38–354
Passing yards	401	245
Passing: Comp–Att–Int	27–45–2	18–28–0
Time of possession	26:46	33:14

Team	Category	Player	Statistics
Arizona	Passing	Jayden de Laura	27/45, 402 yards, 2 TD, 2 int
Arizona	Rushing	Michael Wiley	14 carries, 79 yards, TD
Arizona	Receiving	Jacob Cowing	7 receptions, 133 yards, TD
California	Passing	Jack Plummer	18/28, 245 yards, 3 TD
California	Rushing	Jaydn Ott	19 carries, 274 yards, 3 TD
California	Receiving	Jeremiah Hunter	5 receptions, 82 yards

=== at Washington State ===
California Golden Bears (3–1) at Washington State Cougars (3–1) – Game summary

Quarter	1	2	3	4	Total
Golden Bears	0	3	0	6	9
Cougars	0	7	7	14	28

at Martin Stadium • Pullman, WA

- Date: October 1, 2022
- Game time: 2:40 p.m.
- Game weather: Sunny, 70 °F (21 °C)
- Game attendance: 23,021
- Referee: Michael Mothershead
- TV announcers (Pac-12 Network): Roxy Bernstein (play-by-play), Lincoln Kennedy (analyst)

Game information

First quarter

None

Second quarter

- (13:18) WSU – Jaylen Jenkins 2-yard run, Dean Janikowski kick (Drive: 4 plays, 20 yards, 1:29; Washington State 7–0)
- (9:13) CAL – Dario Longhetto 42-yard field goal (Drive: 8 plays, 51 yards, 4:08; Washington State 7–3)

Third quarter

- (13:51) WSU – Robert Ferrel 17-yard pass from Cameron Ward, Dean Janikowski kick (Drive: 4 plays, 75 yards, 1:09; Washington State 14–3)

Fourth quarter

- (13:28) CAL – Jaydn Ott 2-yard run (Drive: 7 plays, 90 yards, 2:50; Washington State 14–9)
- (12:00) WSU – Renard Bell 37-yard pass from Cameron Ward, Dean Janikowski kick (Drive: 4 plays, 75 yards, 1:28; Washington State 21–9)
- (6:19) WSU – Billy Riviere III 11-yard pass from Cameron Ward, Dean Janikowski kick (Drive: 9 plays, 67 yards, 3:47; Washington State 28–9)

Statistics	CAL	WSU
First downs	13	21
Total yards	311	415
Rushes/yards	25–32	25–72
Passing yards	279	343
Passing: Comp–Att–Int	24–37–0	27–40–0
Time of possession	31:31	28:29

Team	Category	Player	Statistics
California	Passing	Jack Plummer	23/33, 272 yards
California	Rushing	Jaydn Ott	17 carries, 70 yards, TD
California	Receiving	Jeremiah Hunter	6 receptions, 109 yards
Washington State	Passing	Cam Ward	27/40, 343 yards, 3 TD, int
Washington State	Rushing	Nakia Watson	14 carries, 52 yards
Washington State	Receiving	Renard Bell	8 receptions, 115 yards, TD

=== at Colorado ===
California Golden Bears (3–2) at Colorado Buffaloes (0–5) – Game summary

Quarter	1	2	3	4	OT	Total
Golden Bears	0	0	7	6	0	13
Buffaloes	0	3	0	10	7	20

at Folsom Field • Boulder, CO

- Date: October 15, 2022
- Game time: 12:01 p.m. MST
- Game weather: Cloudy, 65 °F (18 °C)
- Game attendance: 50,471
- Referee: Matthew Richards
- TV announcers (Pac-12 Network): J. B. Long (play-by-play), Max Browne (analyst)

Game information

First quarter

None

Second quarter

- (4:11) COL – Cole Becker 31-yard field goal (Drive: 8 plays, 57 yards, 4:39; Colorado 3–0)

Third quarter

- (5:49) CAL – J. Michael Sturdivant 14-yard pass from Jack Plummer, Dario Longhetto kick (Drive: 7 plays, 47 yards, 3:04; California 7–3)

Fourth quarter

- (14:25) COL – Anthony Hankerson 1-yard run, Cole Becker kick (Drive: 6 plays, 58 yards, 1:42; Colorado 10–7)
- (10:20) CAL – Dario Longhetto 27-yard field goal (Drive: 5 plays, 36 yards, 2:04; Tied 10–10)
- (4:30) COL – Cole Becker 24-yard field goal (Drive: 14 plays, 69 yards, 5:50; Colorado 13–10)
- (0:00) CAL – Dario Longhetto 34-yard field goal (Drive: 12 plays, 59 yards, 4:30; Tied 13–13)

Overtime

- (0:00) COL – Montana Lemonious-Craig 22-yard pass from J. T. Shrout, Cole Becker kick (Drive: 3 plays, 35 yards; Colorado 20–13)

Statistics	CAL	COL
First downs	19	17
Total yards	297	328
Rushes/yards	22–35	35–118
Passing yards	262	210
Passing: Comp–Att–Int	29–52–1	22–34–1
Time of possession	30:06	29:54

Team	Category	Player	Statistics
California	Passing	Jack Plummer	29/52, 262 yards, TD, int
California	Rushing	Jaydn Ott	16 carries, 47 yards
California	Receiving	Mavin Anderson	6 receptions, 61 yards
Colorado	Passing	Owen McCown	13/21, 104 yards, int
Colorado	Rushing	Deion Smith	12 carries, 48 yards
Colorado	Receiving	Montana Lemonious-Craig	8 receptions, 119 yards, TD

=== vs Washington ===
Washington Huskies (5–2) vs California Golden Bears (3–3) – Game summary

Quarter	1	2	3	4	Total
Huskies	6	0	8	14	28
Golden Bears	0	0	14	7	21

at California Memorial Stadium • Berkeley, CA

- Date: October 22, 2022
- Game time: 7:35 p.m.
- Game weather: Party Cloudy, 69 °F (21 °C)
- Game attendance: 34,601
- Referee: Mike McCabe
- TV announcers (ESPN): Dave Flemming (play-by-play), Rod Gilmore (analyst), Tiffany Blackmon (sideline)

Game information

First quarter

- (10:45) WASH – Peyton Henry 40-yard field goal (Drive: 10 plays, 52 yards, 4:15; Washington 3–0)
- (2:01) WASH – Peyton Henry 35-yard field goal (Drive: 14 plays, 62 yards, 6:18; Washington 6–0)

Second quarter

None

Third quarter

- (10:20) CAL – J. Michael Sturdivant 8-yard pass from Jack Plummer, Dario Longhetto kick (Drive: 13 plays, 75 yards, 4:40; California 7–6)
- (4:48) WASH – Cameron Davis 6-yard run, Michael Penix Jr. two-point pass to Ja'Lynn Polk (Drive: 11 plays, 70 yards, 5:32; Washington 14–7)
- (2:10) CAL – J. Michael Sturdivant 48-yard pass from Jack Plummer, Dario Longhetto kick (Drive: 6 plays, 65 yards, 2:38; Tied 14–14)

Fourth quarter

- (13:49) WASH – Jalen McMillan 13-yard pass from Michael Penix Jr., Peyton Henry kick (Drive: 10 plays, 75 yards, 3:21; Washington 21–14)
- (10:19) WASH – Richard Newton 36-yard pass from Michael Penix Jr., Peyton Henry kick (Drive: 6 plays, 67 yards, 2:15; Washington 28–14)
- (6:11) CAL – Mavin Anderson 8-yard pass from Jack Plummer, Dario Longhetto kick (Drive: 12 plays, 80 yards, 4:08; Washington 28–21)

Statistics	WASH	CAL
First downs	28	18
Total yards	476	306
Rushes/yards	32–102	31–61
Passing yards	374	245
Passing: Comp–Att–Int	36–51–0	21–34–0
Time of possession	35:25	24:35

Team	Category	Player	Statistics
Washington	Passing	Michael Penix Jr.	36/51, 374 yards, 2 TD
Washington	Rushing	Cameron Davis	13 carries, 46 yards, TD
Washington	Receiving	Jalen McMillan	8 receptions, 81 yards, TD
California	Passing	Jack Plummer	21/34, 245 yards, 3 TD
California	Rushing	DeCarlos Brooks	10 carries, 43 yards
California	Receiving	J. Michael Sturdivant	8 receptions, 104 yards, 2 TD

=== vs No. 8 Oregon ===
No. 8 Oregon Ducks (6–1) vs California Golden Bears (3–4) – Game summary

Quarter	1	2	3	4	Total
No. 8 Ducks	0	21	7	14	42
Golden Bears	3	7	0	14	24

at California Memorial Stadium • Berkeley, CA

- Date: October 29, 2022
- Game time: 12:35 p.m.
- Game weather: Sunny, 61 °F (16 °C)
- Game attendance: 37,077
- Referee: Mark Duddy
- TV announcers (FS1): Tim Brando (play-by-play), Spencer Tillman (analyst)

Game information

First quarter

- (4:01) CAL – Dario Longhetto 28-yard field goal (Drive: 9 plays, 77 yards, 4:09; California 3–0)

Second quarter

- (14:56) ORE – Bo Nix 4-yard run, Camden Lewis kick (Drive: 6 plays, 47 yards, 2:08; Oregon 7–3)
- (13:08) CAL – J. Michael Sturdivant 6-yard pass from Jack Plummer, Dario Longhetto kick (Drive: 5 plays, 75 yards, 1:48; California 10–7)
- (4:14) ORE – Bo Nix 1-yard run, Camden Lewis kick (Drive: 8 plays, 63 yards, 3:21; Oregon 14–10)
- (1:54) ORE – Bucky Irving 12-yard pass from Bo Nix, Camden Lewis kick (Drive: 3 plays, 48 yards, 0:35; Oregon 21–10)

Third quarter

- (12:45) ORE – Noah Whittington 29-yard pass from Bo Nix, Camden Lewis kick (Drive: 5 plays, 75 yards, 2:15; Oregon 28–10

Fourth quarter

- (12:19) ORE – Bo Nix 1-yard run, Camden Lewis kick (Drive: 5 plays, 65 yards, 2:58; Oregon 35–10)
- (7:38) CAL – Monroe Young 11-yard pass from Kai Millner, Dario Longhetto kick (Drive: 13 plays, 75 yards, 4:41; Oregon 35–17)
- (3:16) ORE – Patrick Herbert 40-yard pass from Bo Nix, Camden Lewis kick (Drive: 8 plays, 75 yards, 4:22; Oregon 42–17)
- (2:21) CAL – Justin Richard Baker 55-yard pass from Kai Millner, Dario Longhetto kick (Drive: 3 plays, 75 yards, 0:55; Oregon 42–24)

Statistics	ORE	CAL
First downs	29	21
Total yards	586	402
Rushes/yards	40–174	26–74
Passing yards	412	328
Passing: Comp–Att–Int	27–35–2	28–44–2
Time of possession	31:58	28:02

Team	Category	Player	Statistics
Oregon	Passing	Bo Nix	27/35, 412 yards, 3 TD, 2 int
Oregon	Rushing	Noah Whittington	10 carries, 66 yards
Oregon	Receiving	Noah Whittington	5 receptions, 67 yards, TD
California	Passing	Jack Plummer	20/33, 214 yards, TD, 2 int
California	Rushing	Jaydn Ott	14 carries, 57 yards
California	Receiving	Jeremiah Hunter	5 receptions, 96 yards

=== at No. 9 USC ===
California Golden Bears (3–5) at No. 9 USC Trojans (7–1) – Game summary

Quarter	1	2	3	4	Total
Golden Bears	7	0	7	21	35
No. 9 Trojans	6	14	14	7	41

at Los Angeles Memorial Coliseum • Los Angeles, CA

- Date: November 5, 2022
- Game time: 7:35 p.m.
- Game weather: Clear, 57 °F (14 °C)
- Game attendance: 64,916
- Referee: Chris Coyte
- TV announcers (ESPN): Dave Pasch (play-by-play), Dusty Dvoracek (analyst), Tom Luginbill (sideline)

Game information

First quarter

- (10:29) CAL – Jaydn Ott 10-yard run, Dario Longhetto kick (Drive: 5 plays, 76 yards, 1:46; California 7–0)
- (5:58) USC – Caleb Williams 1-yard run (Drive: 10 plays, 72 yards, 4:23; California 7–6)

Second quarter

- (11:44) USC – Travis Dye 12-yard run, Denis Lynch kick (Drive: 7 plays, 58 yards, 2:26; USC 13–7)
- (0:53) USC – Michael Jackson III 7-yard pass from Caleb Williams, Denis Lynch kick (Drive: 3 plays, 50 yards, 0:59; USC 20–7)

Third quarter

- (11:00) USC – Michael Jackson III 59-yard pass from Caleb Williams, Denis Lynch kick (Drive: 5 plays, 70 yards, 2:21; USC 27–7)
- (7:27) CAL – Monroe Young 2-yard pass from Jack Plummer, Dario Longhetto kick (Drive: 6 plays, 73 yards, 3:26; USC 27–14)
- (1:18) USC – Tahj Washington 8-yard pass from Caleb Williams, Denis Lynch kick (Drive: 8 plays, 86 yards, 4:03; USC 34–14)

Fourth quarter

- (12:56) CAL – Mavin Anderson 47-yard pass from Jack Plummer, Dario Longhetto kick (Drive: 8 plays, 92 yards, 3:17; USC 34–21)
- (9:00) CAL – Jeremiah Hunter 3-yard pass from Jack Plummer (Drive: 10 plays, 52 yards, 3:52; USC 34–28)
- (5:34) USC – Lake McCree 2-yard pass from Caleb Williams, Denis Lynch kick (Drive: 6 plays, 77 yards, 3:20; USC 41–28)
- (2:31) CAL – Jaydn Ott 4-yard run, Jack Plummer two-point pass to Monroe Young (Drive: 12 plays, 85 yards, 2:54; USC 41–35)

Statistics	CAL	USC
First downs	22	24
Total yards	469	515
Rushes/yards	24–63	28–155
Passing yards	406	360
Passing: Comp–Att–Int	35–49–1	26–41–0
Time of possession	32:00	28:00

Team	Category	Player	Statistics
California	Passing	Jack Plummer	35/49, 406 yards, 3 TD, int
California	Rushing	Jaydn Ott	14 carries, 50 yards, 2 TD
California	Receiving	Jeremiah Hunter	6 receptions, 102 yards, TD
USC	Passing	Caleb Williams	26/41, 360 yards, 4 TD
USC	Rushing	Travis Dye	15 carries, 98 yards, TD
USC	Receiving	Michael Jackson III	5 receptions, 115 yards, 2 TD

=== at Oregon State ===
California Golden Bears (3–6) at Oregon State Beavers (6–3) – Game summary

Quarter	1	2	3	4	Total
Golden Bears	0	7	0	3	10
Beavers	14	7	10	7	38

at Reser Stadium • Corvallis, OR

- Date: November 12, 2022
- Game time: 6:00 p.m.
- Game weather: Clear, 50 °F (10 °C)
- Game attendance: 28,642
- Referee: Steven Strimling
- TV announcers (Pac-12 Network): Ted Robinson (play-by-play), Yogi Roth (analyst)

Game information

First quarter

- (5:37) OSU – Ben Gulbranson 3-yard run, Everett Hayes kick (Drive: 10 plays, 65 yards, 4:58; Oregon State 7–0)
- (2:14) OSU – Jam Griffin 3-yard run, Everett Hayes kick (Drive: 6 plays, 31 yards, 3:18; Oregon State 14–0)

Second quarter

- (12:01) OSU – Anthony Gould 55-yard punt return, Everett Hayes (Drive: 3 plays, 3 yards, 0:58; Oregon State 21–0)
- (2:33) CAL – Jeremiah Earby 33-yard fumble return, Dario Longhetto (Drive: 4 plays, 15 yards, 1:51; Oregon State 21–7)

Third quarter

- (10:12) OSU – Everett Hayes 49-yard field goal (Drive: 9 plays, 38 yards, 4:41; Oregon State 24–7)
- (4:03) OSU – Tre'Shaun Harrison 8–yard pass from Ben Gulbranson, Everett Hayes (Drive: 7 plays, 70 yards, 4:18; Oregon State 31–7)

Fourth quarter

- (12:30) CAL – Michael Luckhurst 36-yard field goal (Drive: 16 plays, 57 yards, 6:33; Oregon State 31–10)
- (7:00) OSU – Jack Velling 2-yard pass from Ben Gulbranson, Everett Hayes (Drive: 11 plays, 65 yards, 5:20; Oregon State 38–10)

Statistics	CAL	OSU
First downs	10	21
Total yards	156	362
Rushes/yards	16−9	45−166
Passing yards	147	196
Passing: Comp–Att–Int	22−34−1	18−27−0
Time of possession	23:22	36:38

Team	Category	Player	Statistics
California	Passing	Jack Plummer	22/34, 147 yards, int
California	Rushing	Jaydn Ott	8 carries, 20 yards
California	Receiving	Jeremiah Hunter	6 receptions, 63 yards
Oregon State	Passing	Ben Gulbranson	15/23, 137 yards, 2 TD
Oregon State	Rushing	Damien Martinez	23 carries, 105 yards
Oregon State	Receiving	Tre'Shaun Harrison	8 receptions, 79 yards, TD

=== vs Stanford ===
Stanford Cardinal (3–7) vs California Golden Bears (3–7) – Game summary

Quarter	1	2	3	4	Total
Cardinal	10	0	7	3	20
Golden Bears	6	0	0	21	27

at California Memorial Stadium • Berkeley, CA

- Date: November 19, 2022
- Game time: 2:30 p.m.
- Game weather: Sunny, 64 °F (18 °C)
- Game attendance: 51,892
- Referee: Mike McCabe
- TV announcers (Pac-12 Network): Roxy Bernstein (play-by-play), Lincoln Kennedy (analyst)

Game information

First quarter

- (12:08) STAN – Mitch Leigber 1-yard run, Joshua Karty kick (Drive: 6 plays, 75 yards, 2:52; Stanford 7–0)
- (10:00) CAL – Dario Longhetto 54-yard field goal (Drive: 7 plays, 39 yards, 2:08; Stanford 7–3)
- (3:47) STAN – Joshua Karty 42-yard field goal (Drive: 11 plays, 51 yards, 6:13; Stanford 10–3)
- (0:33) CAL – Dario Longhetto 38-yard field goal (Drive: 8 plays, 55 yards, 3:14; Stanford 10–6)

Second quarter

None

Third quarter

- (8:31) STAN – Elijah Higgins 9-yard pass from Tanner McKee, Joshua Karty kick (Drive: 11 plays, 71 yards, 5:29; Stanford 17–6)

Fourth quarter

- (11:18) CAL – Monroe Young 1-yard pass from Jack Plummer (Drive: 7 plays, 47 yards, 2:47; Stanford 17–12)
- (9:54) CAL – Jackson Sirmon 37-yard fumble return, Jack Plummer two-point pass to Jaydn Ott (Drive: 3 plays, 12 yards, 1:19; California 20–17)
- (0:58) CAL – Jaydn Ott 1-yard run, Dario Longhetto kick (Drive: 3 plays, 9 yards, 1:18; California 27–17)
- (0:00) STAN – Joshua Karty 61-yard field goal (Drive: 9 plays, 37 yards, 0:54; California 27–20)

Statistics	STAN	CAL
First downs	22	19
Total yards	400	393
Rushes/yards	32–129	22–113
Passing yards	271	280
Passing: Comp–Att–Int	29–48–1	23–43–2
Time of possession	33:54	26:06

Team	Category	Player	Statistics
Stanford	Passing	Tanner McKee	29/45, 271 yards, TD, int
Stanford	Rushing	Mitch Leigber	22 carries, 83 yards, TD
Stanford	Receiving	Elijah Higgins	8 receptions, 69 yards, TD
California	Passing	Jack Plummer	23/43, 280 yards, TD, 2 int
California	Rushing	Jaydn Ott	18 carries, 97 yards, TD
California	Receiving	Jeremiah Hunter	5 receptions, 103 yards

=== vs No. 18 UCLA ===
No. 18 UCLA Bruins (8–3) vs California Golden Bears (4–7) – Game summary

Quarter	1	2	3	4	Total
No. 18 Bruins	7	10	7	11	35
Golden Bears	7	14	0	7	28

at California Memorial Stadium • Berkeley, CA

- Date: November 25, 2022
- Game time: 1:40 p.m.
- Game weather: Sunny; 67 °F (19 °C)
- Game attendance: 36,221
- Referee: Michael Mothershed
- TV announcers (FOX): Dan Hellie (play-by-play), Petros Papadakis (play-by-play)

Game information

First quarter

- (7:04) UCLA – Jake Bobo 5-yard pass from Dorian Thompson-Robinson, Nicholas Barr-Mira kick (Drive: 8 plays, 55 yards, 3:10; UCLA 7–0)
- (0:16) CAL – J. Michael Sturdivant 46-yard pass from Jack Plummer, Dario Longhetto kick (Drive: 7 plays, 80 yards, 2:59; Tied 7–7)

Second quarter

- (9:33) UCLA – Nicholas Barr-Mira 23-yard field goal (Drive: 15 plays, 65 yards, 5:36; UCLA 10–7)
- (4:37) CAL – Jeremiah Hunter 38-yard pass from Jack Plummer, Dario Longhetto (Drive: 8 plays, 83 yards, 4:50; California 14–10)
- (0:58) CAL – Jeremiah Hunter 22-yard pass from Jack Plummer, Dario Longhetto (Drive: 4 plays, 44 yards, 1:37; California 21–10)
- (0:18) UCLA – Dorian Thompson-Robinson 19-yard run, Nicholas Barr-Mira kick (Drive: 5 plays, 75 yards, 0:40; California 21–17)

Third quarter

- (7:06) UCLA – Dorian Thompson-Robinson 14-yard run, Nicholas Barr-Mira kick (Drive: 12 plays, 90 yards, 4:11; UCLA 24–21)

Fourth quarter

- (14:01) UCLA – Nicholas Barr-Mira 26-yard field goal (Drive: 9 plays, 35 yards, 4:45; UCLA 27–21)
- (11:16) CAL – Jaydn Ott 8-yard pass from Jack Plummer, Dario Longhetto (Drive: 5 plays, 82 yards, 2:40; California 28–27)
- (7:53) UCLA – Zach Charbonnet 5-yard run, Dorian Thompson-Robinson two-point pass to Jake Bobo (Drive: 10 plays, 73 yards, 3:16; UCLA 35–28)

Statistics	UCLA	CAL
First downs	33	15
Total yards	541	361
Rushes/yards	64–352	18–67
Passing yards	189	294
Passing: Comp–Att–Int	21–30–0	24–34–0
Time of possession	36:50	23:10

Team	Category	Player	Statistics
UCLA	Passing	Dorian Thompson-Robinson	21/30, 189 yards, TD
UCLA	Rushing	Zach Charbonnet	24 carries, 119 yards, TD
UCLA	Receiving	Jake Bobo	7 receptions, 62 yards, TD
California	Passing	Jack Plummer	24/34, 294 yards, 4 TD
California	Rushing	Jaydn Ott	13 carries, 55 yards
California	Receiving	Jeremiah Hunter	8 receptions, 153 yards, 2 TD
