= Jack Miller III =

American football quarterback (born 2002)

No. 10
- Position: Quarterback

Personal information
- Born: April 12, 2002 (age 24); Scottsdale, Arizona, U.S.
- Listed height: 6 ft 3 in (1.91 m)
- Listed weight: 222 lb (101 kg)

Career information
- High school: Chaparral (Scottsdale)
- College: Ohio State (2020–2021); Florida (2022–2023)
- Stats at ESPN

Jack James Miller III (born April 12, 2002) is an American former college football quarterback. Miller attended and played high school football at Chaparral High School located in Scottsdale, Arizona. Following his time as a backup with the Ohio State Buckeyes, Miller announced that he would be transferring to the Florida Gators.

== Early life ==
Miller was born in Scottsdale, Arizona, and later attended Chaparral High School in Scottsdale, Arizona. Miller holds the Arizona state record with 115 passing touchdowns, 3,653 passing yards and 53 touchdowns in a season. Miller was selected as a MaxPreps in 2020. He committed to Ohio State University to play college football.

== College career ==
=== Ohio State ===
Miller spent his true freshman year at Ohio State as a backup to Justin Fields. He did not attempt any passes but scored a rushing touchdown against Nebraska.

Miller was named the backup quarterback to C. J. Stroud as a redshirt freshman following the departure of Fields to the 2021 NFL draft. He played in four games following blowout leads. On November 28, 2021, Miller announced that he was leaving Ohio State. On December 21, 2021, Miller announced his commitment to the Florida Gators.

=== Florida ===
On December 21, 2021, Miller transferred to Florida. After graduating in 2023, it was announced that he retired from college football.

=== College statistics ===
Year	Team	Games			Passing								Rushing			
Year	Team	GP	GS	Record	Cmp	Att	Pct	Yds	Avg	TD	Int	Rtg	Att	Yds	Avg	TD
2020	Ohio State	2	0	0–0	0	0	0.0	0	0.0	0	0	0.0	2	23	11.5	1
2021	Ohio State	4	0	0–0	7	14	50.0	101	7.2	0	0	110.6	5	−1	−0.3	0
2022	Florida	1	1	0–1	13	22	59.1	180	8.2	0	0	127.8	13	13	1.0	0
2023	Florida	0	0	0–0	0	0	0.0	0	0.0	0	0	0.0	0	0	0.0	0
Career		7	1	0–1	20	36	55.6	281	7.8	0	0	121.1	20	35	1.8	1
