= Jeremiah Hunter =

American gridiron football player (born 2002)

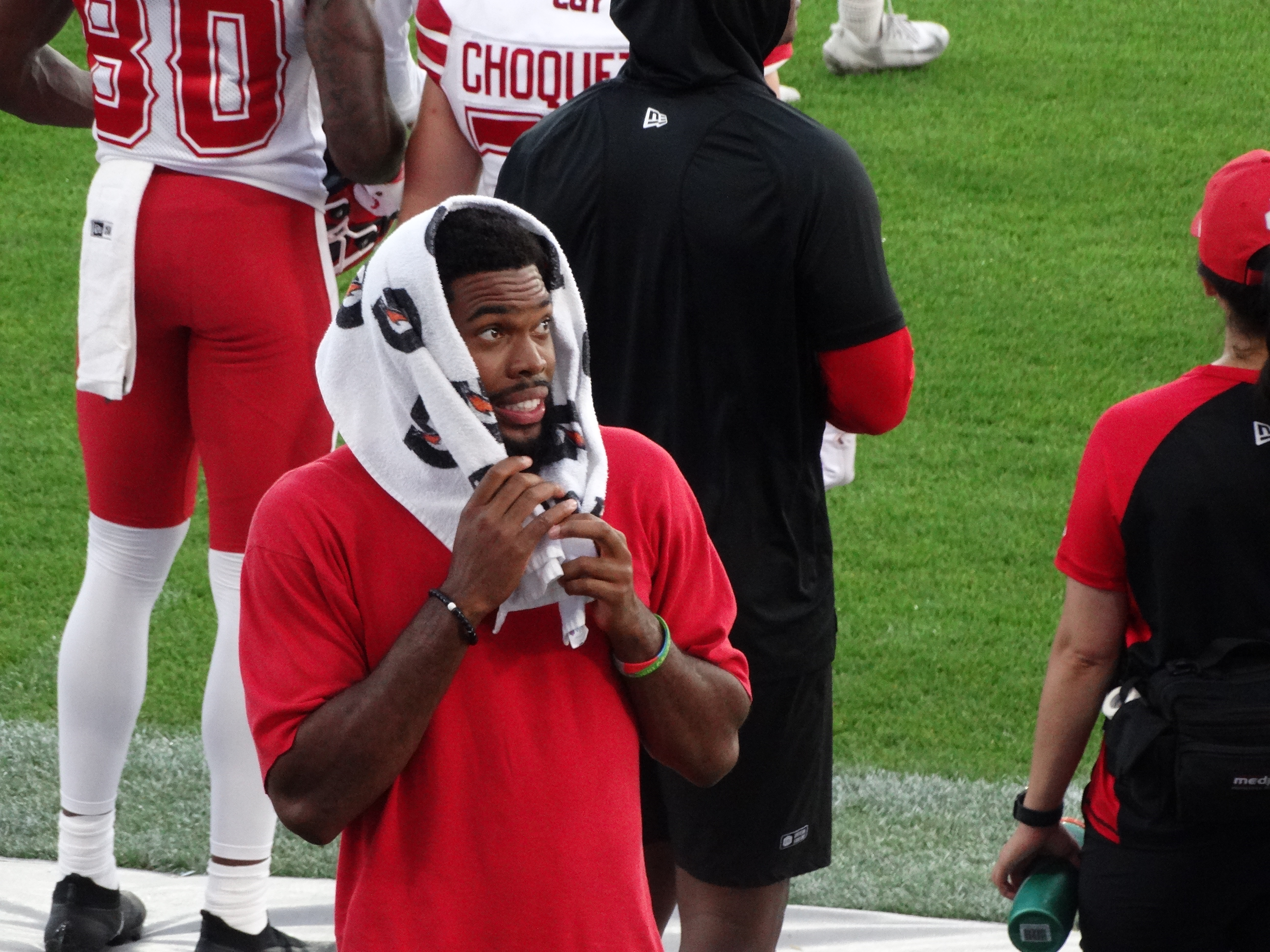
- Hunter with the Calgary Stampeders in 2026

Profile
- Position: Wide receiver

Personal information
- Born: April 12, 2002 (age 24); Fresno, California
- Listed height: 6 ft 1 in (1.85 m)
- Listed weight: 202 lb (92 kg)

Career information
- High school: Central (Fresno, California)
- College: California (2020–2023); Washington (2024)
- NFL draft: 2025: undrafted

Career history
- Calgary Stampeders (2026)*
- * Offseason or practice squad member only
- Stats at ESPN

Jeremiah Hunter (born April 12, 2002) is an American gridiron football wide receiver. He previously played college football for the California Golden Bears and the Washington Huskies.

== Early life ==
Hunter attended Central High School in Fresno, California. He was rated as a three-star recruit and committed to play college football for the California Golden Bears.

== College career ==
=== California ===
As a freshman in 2020, Hunter took a redshirt due to a shoulder injury. In 2021, he totaled 21 receptions for 388 yards and a touchdown in nine games for the Golden Bears. In 2022, Hunter tallied 60 receptions for 965 yards and five touchdowns for California. In week 14 of the 2023 season, he hauled in eight receptions for 101 yards and two touchdowns versus UCLA. During the 2023 season, Hunter notched 63 receptions for 731 yards and a career-high seven touchdowns for the Golden Bears. After the season, he entered his name into the NCAA transfer portal.

=== Washington ===
Hunter transferred to play for the Washington Huskies.

== Professional career ==
Pre-draft measurables
Height	Weight	Arm length	Hand span	Wingspan	40-yard dash	10-yard split	20-yard split	20-yard shuttle	Three-cone drill	Vertical jump	Broad jump	Bench press
6 ft 1 3/8 in (1.86 m)	208 lb (94 kg)	32 in (0.81 m)	9 5/8 in (0.24 m)	6 ft 6 1/4 in (1.99 m)	4.75 s	1.68 s	2.74 s	4.44 s	7.19 s	28.5 in (0.72 m)	9 ft 6 in (2.90 m)	11 reps
All values from Pro Day

In May 2025, Hunter attended rookie minicamp with the Chicago Bears.

Hunter signed with the Calgary Stampeders in January 2026. He was released at the end of the season.
