= 2018 California Golden Bears football team =

American college football season

2018 California Golden Bears football

Cheez-It Bowl, L 7–10 ^{OT} vs. TCU
- Conference: Pac-12 Conference
- North Division
- Record: 7–6 (4–5 Pac-12)
- Head coach: Justin Wilcox (2nd season)
- Offensive coordinator: Beau Baldwin (2nd season)
- Offensive scheme: Multiple
- Defensive coordinator: Tim DeRuyter (2nd season)
- Base defense: 3–4
- Captains: Patrick Laird; Jordan Kunaszyk
- Home stadium: California Memorial Stadium

2018 Pac-12 Conference football standings
| | Conf. | | | Overall |
| Team | W | | L | W | | L |
|---|---|---|---|---|---|---|
North Division
| No. 13 Washington xy$ | 7 | – | 2 | 10 | – | 4 |
| No. 10 Washington State x | 7 | – | 2 | 11 | – | 2 |
| Stanford | 6 | – | 3 | 9 | – | 4 |
| Oregon | 5 | – | 4 | 9 | – | 4 |
| California | 4 | – | 5 | 7 | – | 6 |
| Oregon State | 1 | – | 8 | 2 | – | 10 |
South Division
| Utah xy | 6 | – | 3 | 9 | – | 5 |
| Arizona State | 5 | – | 4 | 7 | – | 6 |
| USC | 4 | – | 5 | 5 | – | 7 |
| Arizona | 4 | – | 5 | 5 | – | 7 |
| UCLA | 3 | – | 6 | 3 | – | 9 |
| Colorado | 2 | – | 7 | 5 | – | 7 |
Championship: Washington 10, Utah 3
$ – Conference champion; x – Division champion/co-champions; y – Championship game participant; Rankings from AP Poll

The 2018 California Golden Bears football team represented the University of California, Berkeley in the 2018 NCAA Division I FBS football season. The Bears went 7–6 during Justin Wilcox's second year as head coach. The Bears upset #15 Washington 12–10 and defeated USC 15–14 at the Los Angeles Memorial Coliseum in Los Angeles to snap a 15-year losing streak to the Trojans, but at the same time, they also snapped an 18-year losing streak to USC in the Coliseum. They lost 10–7 in overtime to TCU in the 2018 Cheez-It Bowl.

Cal's offensive efficiency ranked as the second worst among all Power Five teams. This ranking was in direct contrast to Cal's offensive performances under Cal's previous coach Sonny Dykes; in 2014 Cal was ranked No. 11 in nation in points scored, and in 2015 was ranked No. 13 in total yards. However, there was an inverse contrast in team's defensive performance as Wilcox's 2018 team was ranked No. 15 in total yards allowed as opposed to consistent bottom of the charts performances under Dykes. Two standouts of Cal's defense were second team All-Pac-12 linebacker junior Evan Weaver who had 155 tackles and two interceptions, and first team All-Pac-12 senior Jordan Kunaszyk who had 143 tackles, six forced fumbles and one fumble recovered; Kunaszyk went undrafted but was later signed by the Carolina Panthers.

== Offseason ==
On December 5, 2017, defensive line coach Jerry Azzinaro left the Golden Bears after one season to become the new defensive coordinator for the UCLA Bruins under Chip Kelly.

=== NFL Draft selections ===
The Golden Bears had two individuals selected in the 2018 NFL draft.

| Player | Position | Round | Overall | NFL team |
|---|---|---|---|---|
| Devante Downs | Linebacker | 7 | 225 | Minnesota Vikings |
| James Looney | Defensive end | 7 | 232 | Green Bay Packers |

== Recruiting ==
=== Recruits ===
The Golden Bears signed a total of 21 recruits.

College recruiting (2018)
| Name | Hometown | School | Height | Weight | Commit date |
|---|---|---|---|---|---|
| JH Tevis; DE | Atherton, CA | Menlo School | 6 ft 5 in (1.96 m) | 227 lb (103 kg) | Mar 24, 2017 |
| JH Tevis; DE | Recruit ratings: Scout: Rivals: 247Sports: ESPN: | | | | |
| Nick Alftin; DE | San Jose, CA | Archbishop Mitty High School | 6 ft 6 in (1.98 m) | 245 lb (111 kg) | Mar 29, 2017 |
| Nick Alftin; DE | Recruit ratings: Scout: Rivals: 247Sports: ESPN: | | | | |
| Jasper Friis; OT | San Bernardino, CA | Aquinas High School | 6 ft 7 in (2.01 m) | 315 lb (143 kg) | May 8, 2017 |
| Jasper Friis; OT | Recruit ratings: Scout: Rivals: 247Sports: ESPN: | | | | |
| McCallan Castles; TE | South Lake Tahoe, CA | South Tahoe High School | 6 ft 5 in (1.96 m) | 230 lb (100 kg) | May 24, 2017 |
| McCallan Castles; TE | Recruit ratings: Scout: Rivals: 247Sports: ESPN: | | | | |
| Nikko Remigio; WR | Santa Ana, CA | Mater Dei High School | 5 ft 10 in (1.78 m) | 160 lb (73 kg) | Jun 16, 2017 |
| Nikko Remigio; WR | Recruit ratings: Scout: Rivals: 247Sports: ESPN: | | | | |
| Miles Owens; OT | Oakland, CA | Bishop O'Dowd High School | 6 ft 7 in (2.01 m) | 315 lb (143 kg) | Jul 28, 2017 |
| Miles Owens; OT | Recruit ratings: Scout: Rivals: 247Sports: ESPN: | | | | |
| Will Craig; OT | Granite Bay, CA | Granite Bay High School | 6 ft 5 in (1.96 m) | 265 lb (120 kg) | Jul 29, 2017 |
| Will Craig; OT | Recruit ratings: Scout: Rivals: 247Sports: ESPN: | | | | |
| Evan Tattersall; LB | Granite Bay, CA | Granite Bay High School | 6 ft 2 in (1.88 m) | 215 lb (98 kg) | Jul 29, 2017 |
| Evan Tattersall; LB | Recruit ratings: Scout: Rivals: 247Sports: ESPN: | | | | |
| Chigozie Anusiem; DB | La Habra, CA | Sonora High School | 6 ft 2 in (1.88 m) | 171 lb (78 kg) | Jul 30, 2017 |
| Chigozie Anusiem; DB | Recruit ratings: Scout: Rivals: 247Sports: ESPN: | | | | |
| Slater Zellers; LS | Scottsdale, AZ | Notre Dame Prep | 6 ft 1 in (1.85 m) | 220 lb (100 kg) | Aug 3, 2017 |
| Slater Zellers; LS | Recruit ratings: Scout: Rivals: 247Sports: ESPN: | | | | |
| Brandon Mello; OT | Clayton, CA | Clayton Valley Charter High School | 6 ft 7 in (2.01 m) | 295 lb (134 kg) | Aug 11, 2017 |
| Brandon Mello; OT | Recruit ratings: Scout: Rivals: 247Sports: ESPN: | | | | |
| Matthew Cindric; OT | Sammamish, WA | Skyline High School | 6 ft 4 in (1.93 m) | 270 lb (120 kg) | Aug 24, 2017 |
| Matthew Cindric; OT | Recruit ratings: Scout: Rivals: 247Sports: ESPN: | | | | |
| Colt Doughty; LB | Los Gatos, CA | College of San Mateo | 6 ft 2 in (1.88 m) | 235 lb (107 kg) | Sep 21, 2017 |
| Colt Doughty; LB | Recruit ratings: Scout: Rivals: 247Sports: ESPN: | | | | |
| Lonetona Toailoa Isara; DE | Auckland, NZ | Mt. San Antonio College | 6 ft 3 in (1.91 m) | 260 lb (120 kg) | Oct 24, 2017 |
| Lonetona Toailoa Isara; DE | Recruit ratings: Scout: Rivals: 247Sports: ESPN: | | | | |
| Louis Bickett; LB | Del Mar, CA | Torrey Pines High School | 6 ft 4 in (1.93 m) | 185 lb (84 kg) | Nov 30, 2017 |
| Louis Bickett; LB | Recruit ratings: Scout: Rivals: 247Sports: ESPN: | | | | |
| Johnny Adams; RB | Indianapolis, IN | Ben Davis High School | 5 ft 11 in (1.80 m) | 196 lb (89 kg) | Dec 3, 2017 |
| Johnny Adams; RB | Recruit ratings: Scout: Rivals: 247Sports: ESPN: | | | | |
| Christopher Brown; RB | Oceanside, CA | El Camino High School | 6 ft 1 in (1.85 m) | 218 lb (99 kg) | Dec 4, 2017 |
| Christopher Brown; RB | Recruit ratings: Scout: Rivals: 247Sports: ESPN: | | | | |
| Aaron Maldonado; DT | La Puente, CA | Bishop Amat Memorial High School | 6 ft 3 in (1.91 m) | 280 lb (130 kg) | Dec 20, 2017 |
| Aaron Maldonado; DT | Recruit ratings: Scout: Rivals: 247Sports: ESPN: | | | | |
| Monroe Young; S | Las Cruces, New Mexico | Onate High School | 6 ft 1 in (1.85 m) | 182 lb (83 kg) | Jan 24, 2018 |
| Monroe Young; S | Recruit ratings: Scout: Rivals: 247Sports: ESPN: | | | | |
| Chris Fatilua; LB | San Diego, CA | Madison High School | 6 ft 3 in (1.91 m) | 220 lb (100 kg) | Jan 28, 2018 |
| Chris Fatilua; LB | Recruit ratings: Scout: Rivals: 247Sports: ESPN: | | | | |
| Joseph Ogunbanjo; LB | Houston, Texas | Alief Taylor High School | 6 ft 2 in (1.88 m) | 223 lb (101 kg) | Feb 7, 2018 |
| Joseph Ogunbanjo; LB | Recruit ratings: Scout: Rivals: 247Sports: ESPN: | | | | |
Overall recruit ranking:
Note: In many cases, Scout, Rivals, 247Sports, On3, and ESPN may conflict in their listings of height and weight.; In these cases, the average was taken. ESPN grades are on a 100-point scale.; Sources: "California Football Commitments". Rivals.; "2018 Team Ranking". Rivals.com.

== Preseason ==
=== Award watch lists ===
Listed in the order that they were released

| Award | Player | Position | Year |
|---|---|---|---|
| Lott Trophy | Jordan Kunaszyk | LB | SR |
| Rimington Trophy | Addison Ooms | C | SR |
| Maxwell Award | Patrick Laird | RB | SR |
| Doak Walker Award | Patrick Laird | RB | SR |
| Fred Biletnikoff Award | Kanawai Noa | WR | JR |
| Fred Biletnikoff Award | Vic Wharton III | WR | SR |
| John Mackey Award | Ray Hudson | TE | SR |
| Butkus Award | Jordan Kunaszyk | LB | SR |
| Bronko Nagurski Trophy | Jordan Kunaszyk | LB | SR |
| Outland Trophy | Patrick Mekari | OL | SR |
| Paul Hornung Award | Ashtyn Davis | S/KR | JR |
| Wuerffel Trophy | Patrick Laird | RB | SR |
| Johnny Unitas Golden Arm Award | Ross Bowers | QB | JR |

=== Pac-12 media days ===
The 2018 Pac-12 media days were set for July 25, 2018 in Hollywood, California. Justin Wilcox (HC), Patrick Laird (RB) & Jordan Kunaszyk (LB) at Pac-12 media days. The Pac-12 media poll was released with the Golden Bears predicted to finish in fourth place at Pac-12 North division.

== Schedule ==
| Date | Time | Opponent | Rank | Site | TV | Result | Attendance |
|---|---|---|---|---|---|---|---|
| September 1 | 1:00 p.m. | North Carolina* | | California Memorial Stadium; Berkeley, CA | FOX | W 24–17 | 42,168 |
| September 8 | 7:15 p.m. | at BYU* | | LaVell Edwards Stadium; Provo, UT | ESPN2 | W 21–18 | 52,602 |
| September 15 | 3:00 p.m. | Idaho State* | | California Memorial Stadium; Berkeley, CA | P12N | W 45–23 | 37,104 |
| September 29 | 7:30 p.m. | No. 19 Oregon | No. 24 | California Memorial Stadium; Berkeley, CA | FS1 | L 24–42 | 43,448 |
| October 6 | 7:00 p.m. | at Arizona | | Arizona Stadium; Tucson, AZ | FS1 | L 17–24 | 44,253 |
| October 13 | 4:00 p.m. | UCLA^{†} | | California Memorial Stadium; Berkeley, CA (Joe Roth Memorial Game, rivalry) | P12N | L 7–37 | 45,889 |
| October 20 | 1:00 p.m. | at Oregon State | | Reser Stadium; Corvallis, OR | P12N | W 49–7 | 32,390 |
| October 27 | 3:30 p.m. | No. 15 Washington | | California Memorial Stadium; Berkeley, CA | FS1 | W 12–10 | 39,138 |
| November 3 | 7:45 p.m. | at No. 10 Washington State | | Martin Stadium; Pullman, WA | ESPN | L 13–19 | 32,952 |
| November 10 | 7:30 p.m. | at USC | | Los Angeles Memorial Coliseum; Los Angeles, CA | ESPN | W 15–14 | 56,721 |
| November 24 | 4:00 p.m. | Colorado | | California Memorial Stadium; Berkeley, CA | P12N | W 33–21 | 34,457 |
| December 1 (Note: Rescheduled from November 17 due to poor air quality caused by the Camp Fire.) | 12:00 p.m. | Stanford | | California Memorial Stadium; Berkeley, CA (Big Game) | P12N | L 13–23 | 57,858 |
| December 26 | 6:00 p.m. | vs. TCU* | | Chase Field; Phoenix, AZ (Cheez-It Bowl) | ESPN | L 7–10 ^{OT} | 33,121 |
*Non-conference game; ^{†}Homecoming; Rankings from AP Poll released prior to the game; All times are in Pacific time

== Personnel ==
=== Coaching staff ===
| Name | Position | Seasons at Cal | Before Cal |
|---|---|---|---|
| Justin Wilcox | Head Coach | 2nd as head coach (LB Coach, 2003–2005) | Wisconsin – Defensive coordinator (2016) |
| Beau Baldwin | Assistant head coach / offensive coordinator / tight ends coach | 2nd year | Eastern Washington – head coach (2008–16) |
| Tim DeRuyter | Defensive coordinator / outside linebackers coach | 2nd year | Fresno State – Head coach (2012–16) |
| Gerald Alexander | Defensive backs coach | 2nd year | Montana State – Defensive backs coach (2016) |
| Nicholas Edwards | Wide receivers coach | 2nd year | Eastern Washington – Wide receivers coach (2014–16) |
| Steve Greatwood | Offensive line coach | 2nd year | Oregon – Offensive line / defensive line coach (2000–16) |
| Charlie Ragle | Special teams coordinator / tight ends coach | 2nd year | Arizona – Special teams coordinator (2013–17) |
| Peter Sirmon | Associate head coach / inside linebackers | 1st year | Louisville – Defensive coordinator / outside linebackers coach (2017) |
| Burl Toler III | Running backs coach | 1st as Asst. Coach (WR, 2001–2004) | UC Davis – Wide receivers coach (2016) |
| Marques Tuiasosopo | Quarterbacks coach / passing game coordinator / recruiting coordinator | 2nd year | UCLA – Quarterbacks coach / passing game coordinator (2016) |
| Tony Tuioti | Defensive line coach | 2nd year | Cleveland Browns – Quality Control, Defense (2014–15) |
| Erik Meyer | Quality Control, Offensive | 2nd year | La Mirada HS (CA) – Quarterbacks coach (2008–16) |

=== Roster ===
2018 California Golden Bears Football
| Quarterback: 3 Ross Bowers – (redshirt) junior (6'2, 190); 7 Chase Garbers – (redshirt) freshman (6'2, 210); 11 Brandon McIlwain – (redshirt) sophomore (6'1, 195); 14 Chase Forrest – (redshirt) senior (6'2, 205); Running back: 4 Zion Echols – (redshirt) sophomore (5'8, 180); 22 Derrick Clark – (redshirt) sophomore (5'10, 210); 26 Biaggo Ali Walsh – sophomore (5'10, 190); 28 Patrick Laird – (redshirt) senior (6'0, 200); 30 Billy McCrary III – senior (5'11, 210); 31 Alex Netherda – (redshirt) junior (6'0, 215); Wide receiver: 2 Jordan Duncan – junior (6'1, 210); 9 Kanawai Noa – (redshirt) junior (6'0, 180); 10 Jeremiah Hawkins – sophomore (5'8, 175); 17 Vic Wharton III – (redshirt) senior (5'11, 210); 18 Moe Ways – (redshirt) senior (6'4, 220); 25 Nikko Remigio – freshman (5'10, 170); 30 Matt Rockett – (redshirt) senior (5'9, 195); 36 Hiroaki Endo – (redshirt) senior (6'0, 195); 38 Ricky Walker III – (redshirt) freshman (5'11, 200); 39 Evan King – (redshirt) freshman (6'3, 195); 41 Ben Skinner – freshman (6'2, 195); 81 Brandon Singleton – (redshirt) junior (6'0, 170); 85 Greyson Bankhead – (redshirt) sophomore (6'0, 170); 86 Monroe Young – freshman (6'0, 190); 88 Ryan Regan – freshman (6'0, 175); Tight end: 16 Collin Moore – sophomore (6'4, 225); 80 Jake Ashton – (redshirt) senior (6'3, 235); 82 McCallan Castles – freshman (6'5, 235); 83 Ben Moos – sophomore (6'4, 235); 84 Gavin Reinwald – sophomore (6'3, 215); 87 Kyle Wells – (redshirt) senior (6'3, 245); 89 Matt Laris – (redshirt) sophomore (6'3, 235); 99 Malik McMorris – senior (5'11, 300) (+FB); Punter: 37 Steven Coutts – senior (6'4, 210); 42 Dylan Klumph – (redshirt) senior (6'2, 235) | Offensive lineman: 53 Michael Saffell – sophomore (6'2, 295); 54 Gentle Williams – (redshirt) sophomore (6'3, 295); 57 Addison Ooms – (redshirt) senior (6'4, 300); 58 Semisi Uluave – senior (6'5, 345); 60 Daniel Juarez – sophomore (6'5, 290); 61 Valentino Daltoso – (redshirt) sophomore (6'4, 310); 65 Tanner Prenovost – (redshirt) sophomore (6'0, 265); 70 Poutasi Poutasi – sophomore (6'4, 305); 71 Jake Curhan – (redshirt) sophomore (6'6, 325); 72 Kamryn Bennett – (redshirt) senior (6'3, 310); 74 Ryan Gibson – (redshirt) junior (6'2, 285); 76 Henry Bazakas – (redshirt) junior (6'6, 300); 79 Patrick Mekari – senior (6'4, 300); Defensive end: 44 Zeandae Johnson – (redshirt) junior (6'4, 280); 91 Chinedu Udeogu – (redshirt) sophomore (6'4, 250); 92 Gabe Cherry – sophomore (6'5, 260); 96 Tevin Paul – (redshirt) sophomore (6'4, 270); Nose guard: 50 Hunter Abel – (redshirt) junior (6'0, 275); 93 Luc Bequette – (redshirt) junior (6'2, 290); 98 Chris Palmer – (redshirt) senior (6'2, 320); Outside linebacker: 13 Russell Ude – (redshirt) junior (6'3, 245); 19 Cameron Goode – (redshirt) sophomore (6'3, 225); 36 Alex Funches – senior (6'2, 230); 46 Drew Bryant – (redshirt) senior (6'2, 220); 51 Cameron Saffle – senior (6'3, 250); 89 Evan Weaver – junior (6'3, 250); 94 Trevor Howard – (redshirt) junior (6'3, 250); Placekicker: 41 Gabe Siemieniec – (redshirt) sophomore (6'1, 220); 49 Matt Abramo – (redshirt) junior (6'3, 190) | Inside linebacker: 40 David Ortega Jr. – (redshirt) senior (5'9, 210); 41 Gerran Brown – (redshirt) junior (6'2, 220); 43 Kyle Harmon – sophomore (6'1, 240) (+OLB); 55 Aisea Tongilava – (redshirt) senior (6'1, 220); 59 Jordan Kunaszyk – (redshirt) senior (6'3, 235); Cornerback: 3 Elijah Hicks – sophomore (5'11, 180); 7 Chigozie Anusiem – freshman (6'1, 185); 8 Nygel Edmonds – (redshirt) sophomore (5'11, 190); 16 Chibuzo Nwokocha – (redshirt) senior (6'1, 185); 20 Joshua Drayden – junior (5'9, 185); 22 Traveon Beck – junior (5'9, 160); 24 Camryn Bynum – (redshirt) sophomore (6'0, 180); 27 Ashtyn Davis – (redshirt) junior (6'1, 195); Defensive back: 10 Daniel Scott – sophomore (6'2, 200); 45 Branden Smith – sophomore (5'10, 170); Safety: 4 Derron Brown – (redshirt) senior (6'1, 210); 5 Trey Turner – senior (6'1, 190); 6 Jaylinn Hawkins – (redshirt) junior (6'2, 200); 21 Evan Rambo – (redshirt) junior (6'4, 210); 23 Malik Psalms – (redshirt) junior (6'1, 185); 28 Quentin Tartabull – (redshirt) senior (5'11, 205); 29 Bryce Turner – (redshirt) sophomore (5'10, 175); Long snapper: 45 Grant Gluhaich – (redshirt) junior (5'11, 200); 47 Alonso Vera – senior (5'11, 225); Fullback: 40 Justin Norbeck – (redshirt) senior (6'0, 235) |
Source and player details:

== Game summaries ==
=== North Carolina ===
North Carolina Tar Heels at California Golden Bears

| Quarter | 1 | 2 | 3 | 4 | Total |
|---|---|---|---|---|---|
| Tar Heels | 0 | 0 | 3 | 14 | 17 |
| Golden Bears | 7 | 10 | 7 | 0 | 24 |

at California Memorial Stadium, Berkeley, California

- Date: September 1, 2018
- Game time: 1:05 p.m. PDT
- Game weather: Clear, 66 °F (19 °C)
- Game attendance: 42,168
- Referee: David Epperley
- TV announcers (FOX): Brian Custer and Ben Leber
- Defense keys California's 24-17 win over North Carolina, Game Book

Game information

First quarter

- CAL – Patrick Laird 3-yard run (Greg Thomas kick), 2:40. Golden Bears 7–0. Drive: 4 plays, 23 yards, 1:35.

Second quarter

- CAL – Cameron Goode 38-yard interception return (Greg Thomas kick), 13:51. Golden Bears 14–0. Drive: 3 plays, 3 yards, 0:00.
- CAL – Greg Thomas 35-yard field goal, 6:43. Golden Bears 17–0. Drive: 11 plays, 49 yards, 5:08.

Third quarter

- UNC – Freeman Jones 43-yard field goal, 4:39. Golden Bears 17–3. Drive: 5 plays, 44 yards, 1:16.
- CAL – Patrick Laird 4-yard pass from Chase Garbers (Greg Thomas kick), 0:22. Golden Bears 24–3. Drive: 10 plays, 79 yards, 4:09.

Fourth quarter

- UNC – Antonio Williams 3-yard run (Freeman Jones kick), 6:31. Golden Bears 24–10. Drive: 19 plays, 92 yards, 7:04.
- UNC – Anthony Ratliff 14-yard pass from Nathan Elliot (Freeman Jones kick), 1:13. Golden Bears 24–17. Drive: 14 plays, 0 yards, 1:08.

Passing

- UNC – Nathan Elliott – 15/35, 137 yards, 1 TD, 4 int
- CAL – Ross Bowers – 8/17, 56 yards

Rushing

- UNC – Nathan Elliott – 10 rushes, 58 yards
- CAL – Patrick Laird – 29 rushes, 95 yards, 1 TD

Receiving

- UNC – Anthony Ratliff – 3 receptions, 62 yards, 1 TD
- CAL – Jordan Duncan – 3 receptions, 34 yards

=== At BYU ===
California Golden Bears at BYU Cougars

| Quarter | 1 | 2 | 3 | 4 | Total |
|---|---|---|---|---|---|
| Golden Bears | 7 | 0 | 7 | 7 | 21 |
| Cougars | 0 | 3 | 7 | 8 | 18 |

at LaVell Edwards Stadium, Provo, Utah

- Date: September 8, 2018
- Game time: 8:20 p.m. MDT
- Game weather: Partly cloudy, 79 °F (26 °C)
- Game attendance: 52,602
- Referee: Reggie Smith
- TV announcers (ESPN2): Roy Philpott, Tom Ramsey, and Mark Morgan
- California outlasts BYU for 21-18 win, Game Book

Game information

First quarter

- CAL – Patrick Laird 25-yard pass from Chase Garbers (Greg Thomas Kick), 1:46. Golden Bears 7–0. Drive: 11 plays, 80 yards, 4:31.

Second quarter

- BYU – Skyler Southam 36-yard field goal, 7:53. Golden Bears 7–3. Drive: 13 plays, 67 yards, 6:15.

Third quarter

- CAL – Kanawai Noa 52-yard pass from Chase Garbers (Greg Thomas Kick), 12:10. Golden Bears 14–3. Drive: 7 plays, 79 yards, 2:44.
- BYU – Dayan Ghanwoloku 36-yard fumble return (Skyler Southam Kick), 10:07. Golden Bears 14–10. Drive: 2 plays, 8 yards, 0:37.

Fourth quarter

- CAL – Brandon McIlwain 2-yard run (Greg Thomas Kick), 13:42. Golden Bears 21–10. Drive: 11 plays, 85 yards, 4:57.
- BYU – Brayden El 1-yard pass from Tanner Mangum (Two-point conversion), 0:51. Golden Bears 21–18. Drive: 13 plays, 73 yards, 2:47.

Passing

- CAL – Chase Garbers – 18/28, 176 yards, 2 TD, 1 int
- BYU – Tanner Mangum – 22/41, 196 yards, 1 TD, 2 int

Rushing

- CAL – Brandon McIlwain – 16 rushes, 74 yards, 1 TD
- BYU – Squally Canada – 16 rushes, 49 yards

Receiving

- CAL – Kanawai Noa – 7 receptions, 93 yards, 1 TD
- BYU – Moroni Laulu – 5 receptions, 56 yards

=== Idaho State ===
Idaho State Bengals at California Golden Bears

| Quarter | 1 | 2 | 3 | 4 | Total |
|---|---|---|---|---|---|
| Bengals | 0 | 3 | 6 | 14 | 23 |
| Golden Bears | 7 | 21 | 3 | 14 | 45 |

at California Memorial Stadium, Berkeley, California

- Date: September 15, 2018
- Game time: 3:07 p.m. PDT
- Game weather: Clear, 68 °F (20 °C)
- Game attendance: 37,104
- Referee: Mike McCabe
- TV announcers (P12N): Kate Scott and Lincoln Kennedy
- Garbers passes for 3 TDs in Cal's 45-23 win over Idaho State, Game Book

Game information

First quarter

- (1:41) CAL – Dancy 5 yard rush, Thomas kick

Second quarter

- (11:57) CAL – Duncan 28 yard pass from Garbers, Thomas kick
- (10:13) IDST – Sheidow 23 yard FG
- (10:01) CAL – Davis 89 yard kickoff return, Thomas kick
- (0:53) CAL – Duncan 14 yard pass from Garbers, Thomas kick

Third quarter

- (8:07) IDST – Flanagan 11 yard rush, kick failed
- (0:04) CAL – Thomas 44 yard FG

Fourth quarter

- (10:23) CAL – Ashton 20 yard pass from Garbers, Thomas kick
- (8:04) CAL – Hawkins 4 yard pass from McIlwain, Thomas kick
- (5:23) IDST – M. Gueller 16 yard pass from T. Gueller, Sheidow kick
- (1:26) IDST – Madison 1 yard rush, Sheidow kick

Passing

- IDST – Tanner Gueller: 15/23, 179 yds, 1 TD, 1 int
- CAL – Chase Garbers: 20/25, 224 yds, 3 TD, 1 int

Rushing

- IDST – James Madison: 19 car, 63 yds, 1 TD
- CAL – Marcel Dancy: 11 car, 80 yds, 1 TD

Receiving

- IDST – Mitch Gueller: 6 rec, 156 yds, 1 TD
- CAL – Jordan Duncan: 4 rec, 63 yds, 2 TD

=== Oregon ===
No. 19 Oregon Ducks at No. 24 California Golden Bears

| Quarter | 1 | 2 | 3 | 4 | Total |
|---|---|---|---|---|---|
| No. 19 Ducks | 7 | 21 | 7 | 7 | 42 |
| No. 24 Golden Bears | 3 | 7 | 7 | 7 | 24 |

at California Memorial Stadium, Berkeley, California

- Date: September 29, 2018
- Game time: 7:41 p.m. PST
- Game weather: Clear, 66 °F (19 °C)
- Game attendance: 43,448
- Referee: Kevin Mar
- TV announcers (FS1): Justin Kutcher, DeMarco Murray, and Petros Papadakis
- No. 19 Oregon beats No. 24 California 42-24, Game Book

Game information

First quarter

- CAL – Greg Thomas 25-yard field goal, 7:31. Golden Bears 3–0. Drive: 15 plays, 72 yards, 7:29.
- ORE – Kano Dillon 30-yard pass from Justin Herbert (Adam Stack Kick), 4:13. Ducks 7–3. Drive: 8 plays, 74 yards, 3:18.

Second quarter

- CAL – Brandon McIlwain 28-yard run (Greg Thomas Kick), 9:32. Golden Bears 10–7. Drive: 11 plays, 90 yards, 5:16.
- ORE – Travis Dye 45-yard run (Adam Stack Kick), 5:44. Ducks 14–10. Drive: 8 plays, 75 yards, 3:48.
- ORE – Dillon Mitchell 36-yard pass from Justin Herbert (Adam Stack Kick), 2:47. Ducks 21–10. Drive: 4 plays, 81 yards, 1:11.
- ORE – La'Mar Winston 61-yard fumble return (Adam Stack Kick), 0:18. Ducks 28–10. Drive: 3 plays, 11 yards, 0:15.

Third quarter

- ORE – Cyrus Habibi 1-yard run (Adam Stack Kick), 13:29. Ducks 35–10. Drive: 3 plays, 75 yards, 1:31.
- CAL – Patrick Laird 10-yard run (Greg Thomas Kick), 10:41. Ducks 35–17. Drive: 6 plays, 65 yards, 2:38.

Fourth quarter

- CAL – Jordan Duncan 1-yard pass from Brandon McIlwain (Greg Thomas Kick), 4:31. Ducks 35–24. Drive: 7 plays, 97 yards, 3:04.
- ORE – Ugo Amadi 32-yard interception return (Adam Stack Kick), 3:02. Ducks 42–24. Drive: 2 plays, 7 yards, 0:26.

Passing

- ORE – Justin Herbert – 16/22, 225 yards, 2 TD
- CAL – Brandon McIlwain – 11/21, 128 yards, 1 TD, 2 int

Rushing

- ORE – Travis Dye – 20 rushes, 115 yards, 1 TD
- CAL – Brandon McIlwain – 15 rushes, 123 yards, 1 TD

Receiving

- ORE – Dillon Mitchell – 7 receptions, 105 yards, 1 TD
- CAL – Vic Wharton – 6 receptions, 68 yards

=== At Arizona ===
California Golden Bears at Arizona Wildcats

| Quarter | 1 | 2 | 3 | 4 | Total |
|---|---|---|---|---|---|
| Golden Bears | 0 | 14 | 0 | 3 | 17 |
| Wildcats | 10 | 0 | 7 | 7 | 24 |

at Arizona Stadium, Tucson, Arizona

- Date: October 6, 2018
- Game time: 7:05 p.m. PDT
- Game weather: Clear, 83 °F (28 °C)
- Game attendance: 44,253
- Referee: Mark Duddy
- TV announcers (FS1): Justin Kutcher, DeMarco Murray, and Petros Papadakis
- Wildcats take advantage of turnovers to beat Cal 24-17, Game Book

Game information

First quarter

- ARIZ – Tony Ellison 31-yard pass from Khalil Tate (Josh Pollack Kick), 9:42. Wildcats 7–0. Drive: 11 plays, 75 yards, 5:18.
- ARIZ – Josh Pollack 46-yard field goal, 1:49. Wildcats 10–0. Drive: 9 plays, 36 yards, 3:19.

Second quarter

- CAL – Brandon McIlwain 25-yard run (Greg Thomas Kick), 14:02. Wildcats 10–7. Drive: 7 plays, 75 yards, 2:47.
- CAL – Brandon McIlwain 23-yard run (Greg Thomas Kick), 0:41. Golden Bears 14–10. Drive: 7 plays, 75 yards, 2:13.

Third quarter

- ARIZ – Azizi Hearn 34-yard interception return (Josh Pollack Kick), 3:19. Wildcats 17–14. Drive: 6 plays, 20 yards, 2:40.

Fourth quarter

- ARIZ – Scottie Young 24-yard interception return (Josh Pollack Kick), 3:13. Wildcats 24–14. Drive: 1 play, 0 yards, 0:08.
- CAL – Greg Thomas 35-yard field goal, 0:16. Wildcats 24–17. Drive: 10 plays, 57 yards, 2:57.

Passing

- CAL – Brandon McIlwain – 32/43, 315 yards, 3 int
- ARIZ – Khalil Tate – 15/25, 141 yards, 1 TD, 1 int

Rushing

- CAL – Brandon McIlwain – 20 rushes, 107 yards, 2 TD
- ARIZ – J. J. Taylor – 15 rushes, 73 yards

Receiving

- CAL – Maurice Ways – 8 receptions, 97 yards
- ARIZ – Tony Ellison – 3 receptions, 41 yards, 1 TD

=== UCLA ===
87th rivalry meeting: UCLA Bruins at California Golden Bears

| Quarter | 1 | 2 | 3 | 4 | Total |
|---|---|---|---|---|---|
| Bruins | 7 | 6 | 7 | 17 | 37 |
| Golden Bears | 0 | 0 | 7 | 0 | 7 |

at California Memorial Stadium, Berkeley, California

- Date: October 13, 2018
- Game time: 4:07 p.m. PDT
- Game weather: Clear, 66 °F (19 °C)
- Game attendance: 45,889
- Referee: Chris Coyle
- TV announcers (P12N): Ted Robinson, Yogi Roth, and Jill Savage
- Chip Kelly gets 1st win at UCLA, 37-7 over California, Game Book

Game information

First quarter

- UCLA – Joshua Kelley 5-yard run (J.J. Molson Kick), 2:18. Bruins 7–0. Drive: 9 plays, 59 yards, 4:18.

Second quarter

- UCLA – J.J. Molson 25-yard field goal, 10:32. Bruins 10–0. Drive: 10 plays, 79 yards, 4:40.
- UCLA – J.J. Molson 29-yard field goal, 5:07. Bruins 13–0. Drive: 9 plays, 26 yards, 3:17.

Third quarter

- CAL – Patrick Laird 1-yard run (Greg Thomas Kick), 8:38. Bruins 13–7. Drive: 12 plays, 75 yards, 6:22.
- UCLA – Joshua Kelley 1-yard run (J.J. Molson Kick), 6:03. Bruins 20–7. Drive: 6 plays, 83 yards, 2:30.

Fourth quarter

- UCLA – Joshua Kelley 1-yard run (J.J. Molson Kick), 13:36. Bruins 27–7. Drive: 11 plays, 52 yards, 4:35.
- UCLA – J.J. Molson 42-yard field goal, 7:04. Bruins 30–7. Drive: 4 plays, 5 yards, 2:27.
- UCLA – Keisean Lucier 38-yard fumble return (J.J. Molson Kick), 5:58. Bruins 37–7. Drive: 5 plays, 8 yards, 1:00.

Passing

- UCLA – Dorian Thompson-Robinson – 13/15, 141 yards
- CAL – Brandon McIlwain – 22/40, 168 yards, 2 int

Rushing

- UCLA – Joshua Kelley – 30 rushes, 157 yards, 3 TD
- CAL – Patrick Laird – 17 rushes, 94 yards, 1 TD

Receiving

- UCLA – Caleb Wilson – 5 receptions, 92 yards
- CAL – Jeremiah Hawkins – 4 receptions, 49 yards

=== At Oregon State ===
California Golden Bears at Oregon State Beavers

| Quarter | 1 | 2 | 3 | 4 | Total |
|---|---|---|---|---|---|
| Golden Bears | 7 | 14 | 7 | 21 | 49 |
| Beavers | 0 | 0 | 7 | 0 | 7 |

at Reser Stadium, Corvallis, Oregon

- Date: October 20, 2018
- Game time: 1:10 p.m. PDT
- Game weather: Clear, 64 °F (18 °C)
- Game attendance: 32,390
- Referee: Steve Strimling
- TV announcers (P12N): Ted Robinson, Yogi Roth, and Jill Savage
- Laird has 3 TDs runs in 49-7 Cal win over Oregon State, Game Book

Game information

First quarter

- CAL – Malik McMorris 3-yard pass from Chase Garbers (Greg Thomas Kick), 2:39. Golden Bears 7–0. Drive: 6 plays, 76 yards, 2:01.

Second quarter

- CAL – Patrick Laird 29-yard pass from Chase Garbers (Greg Thomas Kick), 6:59. Golden Bears 14–0. Drive: 3 plays, 40 yards, 1:12.
- CAL – Patrick Laird 4-yard run (Greg Thomas Kick), 2:50. Golden Bears 21–0. Drive: 7 plays, 59 yards, 2:47.

Third quarter

- CAL – Christopher Brown 5-yard run (Greg Thomas Kick), 13:28. Golden Bears 28–0. Drive: 4 plays, 78 yards, 1:27.
- ORST – Jack Colletto 1-yard run (Jordan Choukair Kick), 3:40. Golden Bears 28–7. Drive: 12 plays, 64 yards, 4:39.

Fourth quarter

- CAL – Kanawai Noa 24-yard pass from Chase Garbers (Greg Thomas Kick), 9:44. Golden Bears 35–7. Drive: 6 plays, 50 yards, 2:44.
- CAL – Patrick Laird 30-yard run (Greg Thomas Kick), 3:26. Golden Bears 42–7. Drive: 7 plays, 63 yards, 4:11.
- CAL – Josh Drayden 54-yard interception return (Greg Thomas Kick), 0:20. Golden Bears 49–7. Drive: 8 plays, 23 yards, 3:06.

Passing

- CAL – Chase Garbers – 17/26, 234 yards, 3 TD
- ORST – Jack Colletto – 11/20, 104 yards, 1 int

Rushing

- CAL – Patrick Laird – 22 rushes, 193 yards, 2 TD
- ORST – Artavis Pierce – 13 rushes, 44 yards

Receiving

- CAL – Vic Wharton – 5 receptions, 80 yards
- ORST – Artavis Pierce – 5 receptions, 72 yards

=== Washington ===
No. 15 Washington Huskies at California Golden Bears

| Quarter | 1 | 2 | 3 | 4 | Total |
|---|---|---|---|---|---|
| No. 15 Huskies | 7 | 0 | 0 | 3 | 10 |
| Golden Bears | 3 | 3 | 6 | 0 | 12 |

at California Memorial Stadium, Berkeley, California

- Date: October 27, 2018
- Game time: 3:40 p.m. PDT
- Game weather: Cloudy, 71 °F (22 °C)
- Game attendance: 39,138
- Referee: Mark Duddy
- TV announcers (FS1): Tim Brando, Spencer Tillman, and Holly Sonders
- Cal uses defense to stun No. 15 Washington, 12-10, Game Book

Game information

First quarter

- WASH – Ty Jones 3-yard pass from Jake Browning (Peyton Henry Kick), 7:40. Huskies 7–0. Drive: 14 plays, 64 yards, 6:22.
- CAL – Greg Thomas 23-yard field goal, 5:09. Huskies 7–3. Drive: 6 plays, 36 yards, 2:22.

Second quarter

- CAL – Greg Thomas 35-yard field goal, 6:38. Huskies 7–6. Drive: 14 plays, 62 yards, 6:49.

Third quarter

- CAL – Evan Weaver 37-yard interception return, 0:01. Golden Bears 12–7. Drive: 5 plays, 14 yards, 1:55.

Fourth quarter

- WASH – Peyton Henry 26-yard field goal, 4:51. Golden Bears 12–10. Drive: 6 plays, 13 yards, 2:05.

Passing

- WASH – Jake Browning – 11/21, 148 yards, 1 TD, 1 int
- CAL – Chase Garbers – 16/23, 153 yards

Rushing

- WASH – Kamari Pleasant – 12 rushes, 62 yards
- CAL – Patrick Laird – 22 rushes, 83 yards

Receiving

- WASH – Ty Jones – 3 receptions, 50 yards, 1 TD
- CAL – Vic Wharton – 5 receptions, 45 yards

=== At Washington State ===
California Golden Bears at No. 10 Washington State Cougars

| Quarter | 1 | 2 | 3 | 4 | Total |
|---|---|---|---|---|---|
| Golden Bears | 0 | 10 | 3 | 0 | 13 |
| No. 10 Cougars | 3 | 10 | 0 | 6 | 19 |

at Martin Stadium, Pullman, Washington

- Date: November 3, 2018
- Game time: 7:50 p.m. PDT
- Game weather: Cloudy, 47 °F (8 °C)
- Game attendance: 32,952
- Referee: Kevin Mar
- TV announcers (ESPN): Joe Starkey, Greg McElroy, and Tom Luginbill
- No. 10 Washington State beats California 19-13, Game Book

Game information

First quarter

- WSU – Blake Mazza 29-yard field goal, 10:35. Cougars 3–0. Drive: 10 plays, 63 yards, 4:25.

Second quarter

- CAL – Malik McMorris 2-yard pass from Chase Garbers (Greg Thomas Kick), 11:00. Golden Bears 7–3. Drive: 9 plays, 39 yards, 4:46.
- WSU – Max Borghi 5-yard run (Blake Mazza Kick), 6:47. Cougars 10–7. Drive: 9 plays, 75 yards, 4:13.
- CAL – Greg Thomas 42-yard field goal, 0:36. Tie 10–10. Drive: 6 plays, 46 yards, 1:10.
- WSU – Blake Mazza 36-yard field goal, 0:01. Cougars 13–10. Drive: 5 plays, 32 yards, 0:35.

Third quarter

- CAL – Greg Thomas 46-yard field goal, 2:04. Tie 13–13. Drive: 7 plays, 51 yards, 3:53.

Fourth quarter

- WSU – Easop Winston 10-yard pass from Gardner Minshew, 0:32. Cougars 19–13. Drive: 6 plays, 69 yards, 2:07.

Passing

- CAL – Chase Garbers – 15/26, 127 yards, 1 TD, 1 int
- WSU – Gardner Minshew – 35/51, 334 yards, 1 TD, 1 int

Rushing

- CAL – Chase Garbers – 11 rushes, 67 yards
- WSU – James Williams – 5 rushes, 34 yards

Receiving

- CAL – Vic Wharton – 4 receptions, 47 yards
- WSU – Easop Winston – 7 receptions, 92 yards, 1 TD

=== At USC ===
California Golden Bears at USC Trojans

| Quarter | 1 | 2 | 3 | 4 | Total |
|---|---|---|---|---|---|
| Golden Bears | 0 | 0 | 15 | 0 | 15 |
| Trojans | 0 | 14 | 0 | 0 | 14 |

at Los Angeles Memorial Coliseum, Los Angeles

- Date: November 10, 2018
- Game time: 7:36 p.m. PST
- Game weather: Partly cloudy, 61 °F (16 °C)
- Game attendance: 56,721
- Referee: Mike McCabe
- TV announcers (ESPN): Adam Amin, Rod Gilmore, and Quint Kessenich
- Defensive Cal snaps 14-game skid vs USC with 15-14 victory, Game Book

Game information

First quarter
Second quarter

- USC – Tyler Vaughns 2-yard pass from JT Daniels (Michael Brown Kick), 14:13. Trojans 7–0. Drive: 4 plays, 50 yards, 1:53.
- USC – Tyler Vaughns 23-yard pass from J.T. Daniels (Michael Brown Kick), 7:29. Trojans 14–0. Drive: 6 plays, 51 yards, 3:05.

Third quarter

- CAL – Team safety, 14:03. Trojans 14–2. Drive: 3 plays, -25 yards, 0:57.
- CAL – Vic Wharton 29-yard pass from Chase Garbers (Greg Thomas Kick), 12:51. Trojans 14–9. Drive: 3 plays, 50 yards, 1:12.
- CAL – Chase Garbers 5-yard run, 6:13. Golden Bears 15–14. Drive: 9 plays, 40 yards, 3:37.

Fourth quarter

Passing

- CAL – Chase Garbers – 14/26, 93 yards, 1 TD
- USC – JT Daniels – 21/34, 180 yards, 2 TD, 1 int

Rushing

- CAL – Patrick Laird – 19 rushes, 71 yards
- USC – Aca'Cedric Ware – 16 rushes, 103 yards

Receiving

- CAL – Vic Wharton – 2 receptions, 34 yards, 1 TD
- USC – Tyler Vaughns – 8 receptions, 91 yards, 2 TD

=== Colorado ===
Colorado Buffaloes at California Golden Bears

| Quarter | 1 | 2 | 3 | 4 | Total |
|---|---|---|---|---|---|
| Buffaloes | 0 | 7 | 14 | 0 | 21 |
| Golden Bears | 21 | 3 | 3 | 6 | 33 |

at California Memorial Stadium, Berkeley, California

- Date: November 24, 2018
- Game time: 4:11 p.m. PST
- Game weather: Clear, 60 °F (16 °C)
- Game attendance: 34,457
- Referee: Mike McCabe
- TV announcers (P12N): Roxy Bernstein, Ryan Leaf, and Cindy Brunson
- California's defense scores twice in 33-21 win over Colorado, Game Book

Game information

First quarter

- CAL – Elijah Hicks 34-yard interception return (Greg Thomas Kick), 13:49. Golden Bears 7–0. Drive: 3 plays, 6 yards, 1:11.
- CAL – Ashtyn Davis 35-yard interception return (Greg Thomas Kick), 13:04. Golden Bears 14–0. Drive: 3 plays, -1 yard, 0:45.
- CAL – Patrick Laird 1-yard pass form Chase Garbers (Greg Thomas Kick), 4:41. Golden Bears 21–0. Drive: 8 plays, 29 yards, 4:19.

Second quarter

- COLO – Kyle Evans 1-yard run (James Stefanou Kick), 11:32. Golden Bears 21–7. Drive: 9 plays, 69 yards, 3:49.
- CAL – Greg Thomas 24-yard field goal, 8:14. Golden Bears 24–7. Drive: 4 plays, 8 yards, 2:10.

Third quarter

- COLO – K.D. Nixon 24-yard pass from Steven Montez (James Stefanou Kick), 10:15. Golden Bears 24–14. Drive: 9 plays, 60 yards, 3:12.
- CAL – Greg Thomas 33-yard field goal, 4:56. Golden Bears 27–14. Drive: 6 plays, 34 yards, 1:54.
- COLO – Juwann Winfree 3-yard pass from Steven Montez (James Stefanou Kick), 0:41. Golden Bears 27–21. Drive: 10 plays, 79 yards, 4:08.

Fourth quarter

- CAL – Maurice Ways 7-yard pass from Chase Garbers, 10:35. Golden Bears 33–21. Drive: 11 plays, 72 yards, 5:00.

Passing

- COLO – Steven Montez – 16/33, 170 yards, 2 TD, 3 int
- CAL – Chase Garbers – 14/26, 116 yards, 2 TD

Rushing

- COLO – Travon McMillian – 21 rushes, 58 yards
- CAL – Chase Garbers – 12 rushes, 47 yards

Receiving

- COLO – Laviska Shenault – 7 receptions, 65 yards
- CAL – Vic Wharton – 6 receptions, 61 yards

=== Stanford ===
111th Big Game: Stanford Cardinal at California Golden Bears

| Quarter | 1 | 2 | 3 | 4 | Total |
|---|---|---|---|---|---|
| Cardinal | 10 | 3 | 0 | 10 | 23 |
| Golden Bears | 0 | 6 | 0 | 7 | 13 |

at California Memorial Stadium, Berkeley, California

- Date: December 1, 2018 (rescheduled from November 17, 2018 due to air quality)
- Game time: 12:11 p.m. PST
- Game weather: Clear, 52 °F (11 °C)
- Game attendance: 57,857
- Referee: Steve Strimling
- TV announcers (P12N): Roxy Bernstein, Yogi Roth, and Jill Savage
- Stanford wins 9th straight Big Game, 23-13 over California, Game Book

Game information

First quarter

- STAN – Jet Toner 26-yard field goal, 9:15. Cardinal 3–0. Drive: 12 plays, 75 yards, 5:45.
- STAN – Cameron Scarlett 46-yard pass from K. J. Costello (Jet Toner Kick), 4:37. Cardinal 10–0. Drive: 4 plays, 73 yards, 2:12.

Second quarter

- CAL – Greg Thomas 40-yard field goal, 10:14. Cardinal 10–3. Drive: 11 plays, 36 yards, 3:44.
- CAL – Greg Thomas 24-yard field goal, 4:48. Cardinal 10–6. Drive: 7 plays, 75 yards, 2:39.
- STAN – Jet Toner 19-yard field goal, 0:01. Cardinal 13–6. Drive: 9 plays, 53 yards, 1:21.

Third quarter
Fourth quarter

- STAN – Jet Toner 21-yard field goal, 3:43. Cardinal 16–6. Drive: 13 plays, 77 yards, 7:07.
- STAN – Cameron Scarlett 3-yard run (Jet Toner Kick), 2:27. Cardinal 23–6. Drive: 1 play, 3 yards, 0:05.
- CAL – Jordan Duncan 11-yard pass from Chase Garbers (Greg Thomas Kick), 0:10. Cardinal 23–13. Drive: 13 plays, 75 yards, 2:17.

Passing

- STAN – K. J. Costello – 18/29, 237 yards, 1 TD
- CAL – Chase Garbers – 22/39, 197 yards, 1 TD, 2 int

Rushing

- STAN – Bryce Love – 22 rushes, 74 yards
- CAL – Patrick Laird – 19 rushes, 116 yards

Receiving

- STAN – J. J. Arcega-Whiteside – 5 receptions, 109 yards
- CAL – Jordan Duncan – 5 receptions, 59 yards, 1 TD

=== Vs. TCU (Cheez-It Bowl) ===
Cheez-It Bowl: TCU Horned Frogs vs. California Golden Bears

| Quarter | 1 | 2 | 3 | 4 | OT | Total |
|---|---|---|---|---|---|---|
| Horned Frogs | 0 | 0 | 7 | 0 | 3 | 10 |
| Golden Bears | 7 | 0 | 0 | 0 | 0 | 7 |

at Chase Field, Phoenix, Arizona

- Date: December 26, 2018
- Game time: 7:05 p.m. MST
- Game weather: Clear, 70 °F (21 °C)
- Game attendance: 33,121
- Referee: Marc Curles
- TV announcers (ESPN): Jason Benetti and Kelly Stouffer
- TCU beats Cal 10-7 in overtime of wild Cheez-It Bowl, Game Book

Game information

First quarter

- CAL – Chase Garbers 4-yard run (Greg Thomas Kick), 4:33. Golden Bears 7–0. Drive: 2 plays, 34 yards, 0:29.

Second quarter
Third quarter

- TCU – Sewo Olonilua 1-yard run (Jonathan Song Kick), 0:03. Tie 7–7. Drive: 7 plays, 33 yards, 3:59.

Fourth quarter
Overtime

- TCU – Jonathan Song 27-yard field goal. Horned Frogs 10–7. Drive: 10 plays, 15 yards.

Passing

- TCU – Grayson Muehlstein – 7/20, 27 yards, 4 int
- CAL – Chase Garbers – 12/19, 93 yards, 3 int

Rushing

- TCU – Sewo Olonilua – 32 rushes, 194 yards, 1 TD
- CAL – Christopher Brown – 14 rushes, 57 yards

Receiving

- TCU – Jaelan Austin – 1 reception, 15 yards
- CAL – Kanawai Noa – 2 receptions, 43 yards

== Media affiliates ==
=== Radio ===
- KGO 810 AM - Joe Starkey, Mike Pawlawski, Todd McKim

with Hal Ramey and Lee Grosscup

- KALX 90.7 FM

=== TV ===
- Pac-12 Network
- FSN/ESPN

== Rankings ==
Ranking movements Legend: ██ Increase in ranking ██ Decrease in ranking — = Not ranked RV = Received votes
| | Week | | | | | | | | | | | | | | | | |
| Poll | Pre | 1 | 2 | 3 | 4 | 5 | 6 | 7 | 8 | 9 | 10 | 11 | 12 | 13 | 14 | 15 | Final |
|---|---|---|---|---|---|---|---|---|---|---|---|---|---|---|---|---|---|
| AP | — | — | — | RV | 24 | RV | — | — | — | RV | RV | — | — | — | — | — | — |
| Coaches | — | — | — | RV | RV | RV | — | — | — | — | — | — | — | — | RV | — | — |
| CFP | Not released | | | | | | | | | — | — | — | — | — | — | — | Not released |

== Awards and honors ==
=== Award finalists ===
- Patrick Laird (RB)

Burlsworth Trophy Finalist
Senior CLASS Award Finalist

=== Award semifinalists ===
- Tim DeRuyter (DC/olb coach)

Broyles Award Semifinalist

- Jordan Kunaszyk (LB)

Lott IMPACT Trophy Semifinalist

- Patrick Laird (RB)

Campbell Trophy Semifinalist

=== Award watchlists ===
- Evan Weaver (LB)

Lott IMPACT Trophy Watch List

=== Weekly awards ===
- Team awards

FWAA National Team of the Week (Week 11 vs USC)

- Steven Coutts (P)

Pac-12 Special Teams Player of the Week (Week 13 vs Colorado)

- Luc Bequette (DE)

Pac-12 Defensive Player of the Week (Week 11 vs USC)

- Ashtyn Davis (S)

Pac-12 Defensive Player of the Week (Week 13 vs Colorado)

- Evan Weaver (LB)

Pac-12 Defensive Player of the Week (Week 9 vs Washington)
CSM Pac-12 Defensive Player of the Week (Week 9 vs Washington)

=== Honors ===
- Patrick Laird (RB)

Allstate AFCA Good Works Team
Google Cloud Academic All-District Team

=== All-Pac-12 ===
| Team | Player | Position | Year |
|---|---|---|---|
| First | Jordan Kunaszyk | LB | SR |
| Second | Evan Weaver | LB | JR |
| Honorable | Luc Buquette | DE | JR |
| Honorable | Camryn Bynum | DB | SO |
| Honorable | Steven Coutts | P | JR |
| Honorable | Ashtyn Davis | RS | JR |
