= 2019 California Golden Bears football team =

American college football season

2019 California Golden Bears football

Redbox Bowl champion

Redbox Bowl, W 35–20 vs. Illinois
- Conference: Pac-12 Conference
- North Division
- Record: 8–5 (4–5 Pac-12)
- Head coach: Justin Wilcox (3rd season)
- Offensive coordinator: Beau Baldwin (3rd season)
- Offensive scheme: Multiple
- Defensive coordinator: Tim DeRuyter (3rd season)
- Base defense: 3–4
- Captains: Camryn Bynum; Jake Curhan; Evan Weaver
- Home stadium: California Memorial Stadium

2019 Pac-12 Conference football standings
	Conf.			Overall
Team	W		L	W		L
North Division
No. 5 Oregon xy$	8	–	1	12	–	2
California	4	–	5	8	–	5
Washington	4	–	5	8	–	5
Oregon State	4	–	5	5	–	7
Washington State	3	–	6	6	–	7
Stanford	3	–	6	4	–	8
South Division
No. 16 Utah xy	8	–	1	11	–	3
USC	7	–	2	8	–	5
Arizona State	4	–	5	8	–	5
UCLA	4	–	5	4	–	8
Colorado	3	–	6	5	–	7
Arizona	2	–	7	4	–	8
Championship: Oregon 37, Utah 15
$ – Conference champion; x – Division champion/co-champions; y – Championship game participant; Rankings from AP Poll

The 2019 California Golden Bears football team represented the University of California, Berkeley in the 2019 NCAA Division I FBS football season. They competed as members of the North Division of the Pac-12 Conference. In their third year under head coach Justin Wilcox, the Bears improved to an 8–5 record for only the second time since 2009, finishing 2nd in the Pac-12 North.

The Bears started off the season strong, achieving a No. 15 AP ranking (their highest since 2009) after a 4–0 start, including a 20–19 upset win against No. 14 ranked Washington. However, after injury to quarterback Chase Garbers during the Arizona State game, the Bears proceeded to lose the next four games.

With the return of Garbers, Cal notably defeated Stanford in the Big Game for the first time since 2009. This win clinched bowl eligibility for the Bears while making the Cardinal ineligible for the post-season for the first time in ten years. The Bears went to the Redbox Bowl, where they defeated the Illinois Fighting Illini 35–20, their first bowl win since 2015.

Senior linebacker Evan Weaver was the standout player of the season after leading the nation with a school-record and Pac-12 record 182 tackles, earning him the Pac-12 Defensive Player of the Year and becoming the first consensus All-American from Cal since 2006.

== Preseason ==
=== Coaching changes ===
On February 26, 2019, defensive line coach Tony Tuioti left the Golden Bears to become the new defensive line coach for the Nebraska Cornhuskers under Scott Frost. Andrew Browning was named the Bears' new defensive line coach on February 27, 2019. Browning is the third defensive line coach in three years under Justin Wilcox after Jerry Azzinaro's departure in 2017.

=== Pac-12 media days ===
==== Pac-12 media poll ====
In the 2019 Pac-12 preseason media poll, California was voted to finish in fifth place in the North Division.

== Schedule ==
Three of California first four games were non-conference games, starting on August 31 against UC Davis of the Big Sky Conference. The Golden Bears then played their conference opener against Washington. Rounding out the non-conference slate was a home game against North Texas of Conference USA and a road game against Ole Miss of the Southeastern Conference (SEC). In conference, Cal did not play Arizona or Colorado.

Date	Time	Opponent	Rank	Site	TV	Result	Attendance
August 31	3:30 p.m.	No. 5 (FCS) UC Davis*		California Memorial Stadium; Berkeley, CA	P12N	W 27–13	44,168
September 7	7:30 p.m.	at No. 14 Washington		Husky Stadium; Seattle, WA	FS1	W 20–19	66,327
September 14	1:15 p.m.	North Texas*		California Memorial Stadium; Berkeley, CA	P12N	W 23–17	35,268
September 21	9:00 a.m.	at Ole Miss*	No. 23	Vaught–Hemingway Stadium; Oxford, MS	ESPNU	W 28–20	46,850
September 27	7:30 p.m.	Arizona State	No. 15	California Memorial Stadium; Berkeley, CA	ESPN	L 17–24	47,532
October 5	5:00 p.m.	at No. 13 Oregon		Autzen Stadium; Eugene, OR	FOX	L 7–17	54,766
October 19	11:30 a.m.	Oregon State^{†}		California Memorial Stadium; Berkeley, CA	P12N	L 17–21	42,064
October 26	7:00 p.m.	at No. 12 Utah		Rice–Eccles Stadium; Salt Lake City, UT	FS1	L 0–35	46,626
November 9	4:00 p.m.	Washington State		California Memorial Stadium; Berkeley, CA	P12N	W 33–20	39,168
November 16	8:00 p.m.	USC		California Memorial Stadium; Berkeley, CA (Joe Roth Memorial Game)	FS1	L 17–41	46,397
November 23	1:00 p.m.	at Stanford		Stanford Stadium; Stanford, CA (Big Game)	P12N	W 24–20	48,904
November 30	7:30 p.m.	at UCLA		Rose Bowl; Pasadena, CA (rivalry)	FS1	W 28–18	38,102
December 30	1:00 p.m.	vs. Illinois*		Levi's Stadium; Santa Clara, CA (Redbox Bowl)	FOX	W 35–20	34,177
*Non-conference game; ^{†}Homecoming; Rankings from AP Poll and CFP Rankings after November 5 released prior to game; All times are in Pacific time

== Game summaries ==
* Home games are in dark blue

=== UC Davis ===
	1	2	3	4	Total
No. 5 (FCS) Aggies	10	0	3	0	13
Golden Bears	0	13	7	7	27

=== At Washington ===
California at Washington – Game summary

Quarter	1	2	3	4	Total
Golden Bears	0	3	14	3	20
No. 14 Huskies	0	10	3	6	19

at Husky Stadium • Seattle, WA

- Date: September 7, 2019
- Game time: 7:30 p.m. PDT
- Game weather: 68 °F (20 °C) • Cloudy (Lightning) • Wind @ 0 mph (0 km/h)
- Game attendance: 66,327
- Referee: Michael Mothershed
- TV: FS1

Game information

Top passers

- CAL – Chase Garbers: 11/18, 111 yards
- UW – Jacob Eason: 18/31, 162 yards, one interception

Top rushers

- CAL – Christopher Brown Jr.: 16 attempts, 80 yards
- UW – Salvon Ahmed: 21 attempts, 119 yards, one touchdown

Top receiving

- CAL – Kekoa Crawford: 3 receptions, 48 yards
- UW – Hunter Bryant: 4 receptions, 40 yards; Aaron Fuller: 3 receptions, 40 yards

The game started at 7:30 pm, but was paused at the end of first quarter due to a lightning storm; the pause lasted for approximately two and a half hours. By the time of the restart - 10 pm, there was only approximately 16,000 of the original approximately 60,000 fans left at the venue. Relying on rushing of running backs Christopher Brown (80 yards), and Marcel Dancy (72 yards, 2 touchdowns) and quarterback Chase Garbers (42 yards), Cal won on a last minute field goal by Greg Thomas. This was the Golden Bears second straight win against the Huskies. In the 2018 home game Cal upset No. 15 Washington 12 to 10.

=== North Texas ===
	1	2	3	4	Total
Mean Green	0	3	7	7	17
Golden Bears	20	0	3	0	23

=== At Ole Miss ===
	1	2	3	4	Total
No. 23 Golden Bears	7	7	14	0	28
Rebels	7	6	0	7	20

=== Arizona State ===
	1	2	3	4	Total
Sun Devils	7	0	7	10	24
No. 15 Golden Bears	7	0	7	3	17

In the final drive of the first half, quarterback Chase Garbers was injured, breaking his right collarbone. Gabrers would not be cleared to play again until he started against USC.

=== At Oregon ===
	1	2	3	4	Total
Golden Bears	7	0	0	0	7
No. 13 Ducks	0	0	10	7	17

=== Oregon State ===
	1	2	3	4	Total
Beavers	7	7	0	7	21
Golden Bears	0	3	14	0	17

=== At Utah ===
	1	2	3	4	Total
Golden Bears	0	0	0	0	0
No. 12 Utes	7	21	7	0	35

This defeat was the first shutout of a California team since a 1999 defeat to No. 5 Nebraska. Starting quarterback Chase Garbers and backup Devon Modster were injured for the game.

=== Washington State ===
	1	2	3	4	Total
Cougars	5	6	3	6	20
Golden Bears	6	7	7	13	33

=== USC ===
USC Trojans at California Golden Bears

Quarter	1	2	3	4	Total
Trojans	10	7	17	7	41
Golden Bears	7	3	0	7	17

at California Memorial Stadium, Berkeley, California

- Date: November 16, 2019
- Game time: 8:00 p.m
- Game attendance: 46,397
- TV: FS1

Game information

First quarter

- CAL (12:05) – #26 DeShawn Collins 5 yard run TD
  (#39 Greg Thomas kick) – CAL 7–0
- USC (8:11) – #9 Kedon Slovis to #8 Amon-Ra St. Brown 18 yard pass TD
  (#40 Chase McGrath kick) – USC 7–7
- USC (0:07) – #40 Chase McGrath 41 yard Field Goal – USC 10–7

Second quarter

- CAL (9:22) – #39 Greg Thomas 37 yard Field Goal – USC 10–10
- USC (0:43) – #9 Kedon Slovis to #6 Michael Pittman Jr. 33 yard pass TD
  (#40 Chase McGrath kick) – USC 17–10

Third quarter

- USC (12:11) – #9 Kedon Slovis to #15 Drake London 8 yard pass TD
  (#40 Chase McGrath kick) – USC 24–10
- USC (7:20) – #40 Chase McGrath 32 yard Field Goal – USC 27–10
- USC (2:29) – #7 Stephen Carr 2 yard run TD
  (#40 Chase McGrath kick) – USC 34–10

Fourth quarter

- USC (10:12) – #9 Kedon Slovis to #83 Josh Falo 5 yard pass TD
  (#40 Chase McGrath kick) – USC 41–10
- CAL (8:24) – #26 DeShawn Collins 34 yard run TD
  (#39 Greg Thomas kick) – USC 41–17

Passing

- USC – #9 Kedon Slovis – 29/35 406 Yds – 4 TD
- CAL – #6 Devon Modster – 11/22 95 Yds – 2 int

Rushing

- USC – #23 Kenan Christon – 9 Runs 44 Yds
- CAL – #26 DeShawn Collins – 15 Runs 103 Yds – 2 TD

Receiving

- USC – #6 Michael Pittman Jr. – 11 Rec 180 Yds – 1 TD
- CAL – #2 Jordan Duncan – 5 Rec 53 Yds

=== At Stanford ===
California Golden Bears vs. Stanford Cardinal – Game summary

Quarter	1	2	3	4	Total
Golden Bears	7	3	0	14	24
Cardinal	7	3	7	3	20

at Stanford Stadium • Stanford, California

- Date: November 23, 2019
- Game time: 1:00 p.m. PST
- Game attendance: 48,904
- Referee: Chris Coyte
- TV: P12N
- Reference

Game information

First quarter

- STAN – Donald Stewart 40-yard pass from Davis Mills (Ryan Sanborn kick), 13:00. Stanford 7–0. Drive: 4 plays, 60 yards, 2:00.
- CAL – Christopher Brown 7-yard run (Greg Thomas kick), 0:45. Tied 7–7. Drive: 13 plays, 90 yards, 6:02.

Second quarter

- STAN – Ryan Sanborn 48-yard field goal, 11:45. Stanford 10–7. Drive: 8 plays, 52 yards, 3:59.
- CAL – Greg Thomas 49-yard field goal, 7:37. Tied 10–10. Drive: 9 plays, 43 yards, 4:08.

Third quarter

- STAN – Cameron Scarlett 1-yard run (Ryan Sanborn kick), 2:09. Stanford 17–10. Drive: 6 plays, 30 yards, 2:59.

Fourth quarter

- CAL – Nikko Remigio 18-yard pass from Chase Garbers (Greg Thomas kick), 7:44. Tied 17–17. Drive: 5 plays, 84 yards, 2:15.
- STAN – Ryan Sanborn 44-yard field goal, 2:23. Stanford 20–17. Drive: 10 plays, 39 yards, 5:17.
- CAL – Chase Garbers 16-yard run (Greg Thomas kick), 1:19. California 24–20. Drive: 6 plays, 75 yards, 1:04.

Top passers

- CAL – Chase Garbers – 20/30, 285 yards, TD
- STAN – Davis Mills – 26/35, 290 yards, TD, 2 int

Top rushers

- CAL – Chase Garbers – 13 rushes, 72 yards, TD
- STAN – Cameron Scarlett – 12 rushes, 31 yards, TD

Top receivers

- CAL – Nikko Remigio – 9 receptions, 157 yards, TD
- STAN – Michael Wilson – 6 receptions, 63 yards

With this victory, Cal ended Stanford's nine-year win streak in the Big Game. The win also ensured the Bears' qualification to a bowl game for the second consecutive year, the first time this has happened in ten years. Likewise, the loss put Stanford at 4–7 for the season, ending its hopes of making its tenth consecutive bowl game.

=== At UCLA ===
	1	2	3	4	Total
Golden Bears	7	7	7	7	28
Bruins	7	3	8	0	18

=== Vs. Illinois (Redbox Bowl) ===
	1	2	3	4	Total
Golden Bears	7	14	7	7	35
Fighting Illini	10	3	0	7	20

== Personnel ==
=== Coaching staff ===
Name	Position	Seasons at Cal	Before Cal
Justin Wilcox	Head coach	3rd as head coach (LB coach, 2003–2005)	Wisconsin – Defensive coordinator (2016)
Beau Baldwin	Offensive coordinator / quarterbacks coach	3rd year	Eastern Washington – Head coach (2008–16)
Tim DeRuyter	Defensive coordinator / outside linebackers coach	3rd year	Fresno State – Head coach (2012–16)
Gerald Alexander	Defensive backs coach	3rd year	Montana State – Defensive backs coach (2016)
Andrew Browning	Defensive line coach	2nd year	UTEP – Defensive line coach (2013–17)
Nicholas Edwards	Wide receivers coach	3rd year	Eastern Washington – Wide receivers coach (2014–16)
Steve Greatwood	Offensive line coach	3rd year	Oregon – Offensive line / defensive line coach (2000–16)
Erik Meyer	Quality Control, Offensive	3rd year	La Mirada HS (CA) – Quarterbacks coach (2008–16)
Charlie Ragle	Special teams coordinator	3rd year	Arizona – Special teams coordinator (2013–17)
Peter Sirmon	Co-defensive coordinator / associate head coach / inside linebackers	2nd year	Louisville – Defensive coordinator / outside linebackers coach (2017)
Burl Toler III	Wide receivers coach	2nd as Asst. Coach (WR, 2001–2004)	UC Davis – Wide receivers coach (2016)
Marques Tuiasosopo	Tight ends coach	3rd year	UCLA – Quarterbacks coach / passing game coordinator (2016)

=== Roster ===
2019 California Golden Bears Football
Quarterback: 6 Devon Modster – (redshirt) junior (6'2, 210); 7 Chase Garbers – (redshirt) sophomore (6'2, 205); 13 Spencer Brasch – freshman (6'4, 180); 15 Robbie Rowell – (redshirt) freshman (6'2, 220); Running back: 9 Alex Netherda – (redshirt) senior (6'0, 215); 23 Marcel Dancy – (redshirt) junior (5'10, 195); 25 DeCarlos Brooks – freshman (5'9, 190); 26 DeShawn Collins – (redshirt) junior (5'10, 195); 34 Christopher Brown – sophomore (6'1, 230); Wide receiver: 2 Jordan Duncan – senior (6'1, 205); 4 Nikko Remigio – sophomore (5'10, 185); 10 Jeremiah Hawkins – junior (5'8, 180); 11 Kekoa Crawford – (redshirt) junior (6'1, 190); 14 Monroe Young – (redshirt) freshman (6'0, 200); 17 Makai Polk – freshman (6'3, 185); 21 Ricky Walker III – (redshirt) sophomore (5'11, 190); 39 Evan King – (redshirt) sophomore (6'3, 205); 41 Ben Skinner – (redshirt) freshman (6'2, 185); 80 Trevon Clark – junior (6'4, 180); 83 Chris Rogers – freshman (6'3, 175); 86 Jared Staub – freshman (6'0, 180); 87 Lucas Allen – freshman (6'2, 205); 88 Ryan Regan – (redshirt) freshman (6'0, 185); Tight end: 16 Collin Moore – (redshirt) sophomore (6'4, 250); 49 Nick Alftin – (redshirt) freshman (6'5, 235); 81 Elijah Mojarro – freshman (6'5, 245); 82 McCallan Castles – (redshirt) freshman (6'4, 235); 84 Gavin Reinwald – (redshirt) sophomore (6'3, 235); 85 Jake Tonges – (redshirt) sophomore (6'5, 230); Placekicker: 36 Nick Lopez – freshman (6'1, 190); 39 Greg Thomas – (redshirt) senior (5'9, 165); Punter: 30 Dario Longhetto – (redshirt) freshman (6'0, 170); 37 Steven Coutts – (redshirt) senior (6'4, 215)	Offensive lineman: 53 Michael Saffell – junior (6'2, 300); 56 Jack Beeman – (redshirt) sophomore (6'4, 290); 60 Brian Driscoll – freshman (6'4, 295); 61 Valentino Daltoso – (redshirt) junior (6'4, 300); 62 Ben Coleman – freshman (6'4, 315); 63 Brayden Rohme – freshman (6'6, 260); 64 Gentle Williams – (redshirt) junior (6'3, 290); 66 Cal Frank – freshman (6'7, 270); 68 Erick Nisich – (redshirt) freshman (6'4, 290); 70 Poutasi Poutasi – (redshirt) sophomore (6'4, 340); 71 Jake Curhan – (redshirt) junior (6'6, 335); 72 McKade Mettauer – freshman (6'4, 285); 73 Matthew Cindric – (redshirt) freshman (6'4, 295); 74 Will Craig – sophomore (6'5, 290); 76 Henry Bazakas – (redshirt) senior (6'6, 315); 78 Brandon Mello – (redshirt) freshman (6'6, 295); Defensive end: 44 Zeandae Johnson – (redshirt) senior (6'4, 290); 47 JH Tevis – (redshirt) freshman (6'4, 275); 55 Lone Toailoa – (redshirt) senior (6'2, 290); 92 Gabriel Cherry – (redshirt) sophomore (6'5, 280); Nose guard: 90 Brett Johnson – freshman (6'5, 285); 94 Gunnar Rask – freshman (6'2, 275); 95 Miles Owens – (redshirt) freshman (6'6, 350); 97 Aaron Maldonado – sophomore (6'3, 285); 99 Siulagisipai Fuimaono – (redshirt) sophomore (6'4, 320); Outside linebacker: 15 Ben Moos – (redshirt) sophomore (6'4, 230); 19 Cameron Goode – (redshirt) junior (6'3, 235); 33 Myles Jernigan – freshman (6'3, 220); 38 Matt Horwitz – (redshirt) sophomore (6'4, 235); 40 Parker Bosche – (redshirt) freshman (6'4, 225); 41 Curley Young Jr. – freshman (6'1, 220); 48 Orin Patu – freshman (6'4, 220); 52 Braxten Croteau – freshman (6'5, 240); 91 Chinedu Udeogu – (redshirt) junior (6'4, 270); 96 Tevin Paul – (redshirt) junior (6'4, 260); 98 Ben Hawk Schrider – (redshirt) senior (6'3, 240)	Inside linebacker: 8 Kuony Deng – (redshirt) junior (6'6, 220); 42 Colt Doughty – senior (6'1, 230); 50 Kyle Smith – freshman (6'3, 215); 51 Blake Antzoulatos – freshman (6'2, 220); 53 Tommy Vanis – (redshirt) freshman (6'1, 215); 54 Evan Tattersall – (redshirt) freshman (6'2, 235); 56 Sam Walker – (redshirt) freshman (6'3, 225); 57 Nick Henderson – (redshirt) freshman (6'2, 210); 58 Zach Angelillo – (redshirt) freshman (6'2, 220); 59 Ryan Puskas – freshman (6'3, 210); 60 Alex Murray – freshman (6'2, 205); 89 Evan Weaver – senior (6'3, 235); Cornerback: 3 Elijah Hicks – junior (5'11, 195); 7 Chigozie Anusiem – (redshirt) freshman (6'1, 190); 18 Branden Smith – (redshirt) sophomore (5'10, 170); 20 Josh Drayden – senior (5'10, 180); 24 Camryn Bynum – (redshirt) junior (6'0, 195); 25 Erik Harutyunyan – freshman (6'2, 205); 28 Miles Williams – freshman (6'0, 180); 30 Jaylen Martin – freshman (6'2, 165); 34 Tarik Glenn Jr. – freshman (5'10, 175); 36 D'Shawn Hopkins – junior (5'11, 205); Defensive line: 93 Luc Bequette – (redshirt) junior (6'0, 195); Safety: 2 Isaiah Humphries – (redshirt) freshman (5'11, 190); 5 Trey Turner III – (redshirt) senior (6'1, 185); 6 Jaylinn Hawkins – (redshirt) senior (6'2, 210); 26 Craig Woodson – freshman (6'0, 190); 27 Ashtyn Davis – (redshirt) senior (6'1, 200); 31 Steve Mcintosh – (redshirt) freshman (5'11, 185); 32 Daniel Scott – (redshirt) sophomore (6'2, 195); Long snapper: 32 JJ Lindsay – freshman (6'1, 185); 45 Slater Zellers – (redshirt) freshman (6'1, 235); 48 Daniel Etter – (redshirt) sophomore (5'10, 225); Nickelback: 22 Traveon Beck – senior (5'9, 165)
Source and player details:

== Rankings ==
Ranking movements Legend: ██ Increase in ranking ██ Decrease in ranking — = Not ranked RV = Received votes
	Week																
Poll	Pre	1	2	3	4	5	6	7	8	9	10	11	12	13	14	15	Final
AP	—	—	RV	23	15	RV	RV	RV	—	—	—	—	—	—	RV	RV	RV
Coaches	—	—	RV	23	16	RV	RV	RV	—	—	—	—	—	—	—	RV	RV
CFP	Not released									—	—	—	—	—	—	—	Not released

== Media affiliates ==
=== Radio ===
- KGO 810 AM - Joe Starkey, Mike Pawlawski, Todd McKim, Hal Ramey
- KALX 90.7 FM

=== TV ===
- Pac-12 Network
- FSN/ESPN

== Players drafted into the NFL ==
Round	Pick	Player	Position	NFL club
3	68	Ashtyn Davis	S	New York Jets
4	134	Jaylinn Hawkins	S	Atlanta Falcons
6	202	Evan Weaver	LB	Arizona Cardinals
