= 2016 California Golden Bears football team =

American college football season

2016 California Golden Bears football
- Conference: Pac-12 Conference
- North Division
- Record: 5–7 (3–6 Pac-12)
- Head coach: Sonny Dykes (4th season)
- Offensive coordinator: Jake Spavital (1st season)
- Offensive scheme: Bear raid
- Defensive coordinator: Art Kaufman (3rd season)
- Base defense: 4–3
- Home stadium: California Memorial Stadium

2016 Pac-12 Conference football standings
	Conf.			Overall
Team	W		L	W		L
North Division
No. 4 Washington xy$^	8	–	1	12	–	2
Washington State	7	–	2	8	–	5
No. 12 Stanford	6	–	3	10	–	3
California	3	–	6	5	–	7
Oregon State	3	–	6	4	–	8
Oregon	2	–	7	4	–	8
South Division
No. 17 Colorado xy	8	–	1	10	–	4
No. 3 USC	7	–	2	10	–	3
No. 23 Utah	5	–	4	9	–	4
Arizona State	2	–	7	5	–	7
UCLA	2	–	7	4	–	8
Arizona	1	–	8	3	–	9
Championship: Washington 41, Colorado 10
^ – College Football Playoff participant; $ – Conference champion; x – Division champion/co-champions; y – Championship game participant; Rankings from AP Poll

The 2016 California Golden Bears football team represented the University of California, Berkeley in the 2016 NCAA Division I FBS football season. The Bears were led by fourth-year head coach Sonny Dykes and played their home games at Memorial Stadium.

Shortly after the conclusion of the 2015 season, Dykes stated that he did not anticipate any staff turnover. However, offensive coordinator Tony Franklin resigned from his position at California a few weeks after Dykes made this statement. Franklin left to take up the same position at Middle Tennessee State, citing a desire to move closer to his family in Kentucky. Dykes replaced Franklin with Jake Spavital, who had recently been fired by Texas A&M University. Like Dykes, Spavital was from Mike Leach's Air Raid coaching tree. An additional signing from that lineage was the transfer of quarterback Davis Webb from Texas Tech; Webb completed his bachelor's degree in three years transferring to Cal for his final year of eligibility as a graduate student.

Cal went 5–7 in 2016, winning only 3 out of their 9 Pac-12 games. Dykes once again lost to Stanford at home by two touchdowns and to USC in Los Angeles by three touchdowns. His team also lost to San Diego State of the Mountain West Conference. Highlights of that season were Cal's second straight beating of then-No. 11 Texas and the team's win over UCLA. This was the first time that Dykes was able to lead the team to beat one of Cal's three traditional rivals – Stanford, UCLA and USC. In his only season as Cal's quarterback, Davis Webb beat Jared Goff's passing attempts and completions records, and equaled his marks for 300-yard passing games (10) and touchdowns (43), with 37 in the air and six on the ground. Webb was drafted in the third round by New York Giants.

Sonny Dykes was fired on January 8, 2017. He finished at Cal with a four-year record of 19–30. The firing came as a surprise, as his contract was previously extended and most coaching changes come right after the end of a season and not the following year. Two of the stated concerns were Dykes' commitment to the program, as at the end of 2016 Dykes was interviewed by Baylor University for their head coaching position, and the significant decreases in home game attendance – thirty percent fewer season tickets were renewed for 2017 than for the previous year.

== Personnel ==
=== Coaching staff ===
Name	Position	Cal years	Alma mater
Sonny Dykes	Head coach / outside wide receivers coach	4th	Texas Tech (1993)
Art Kaufman	Defensive coordinator / linebackers coach	3rd	Arkansas–Monticello (1980)
Jake Spavital	Offensive coordinator / quarterbacks coach	1st	Missouri State (2008)
Greg Burns	Safeties coach	3rd	Washington State (1995)
Garret Chachere	Associate head coach / running backs coach	4th	Tulane (1992)
Brandon Jones	Run game coordinator / offensive line coach	2nd	Texas Tech (2006)
John Lovett	Cornerbacks coach	2nd	C.W. Post (1973)
Jacob Peeler	Inside wide receivers coach	4th	Louisiana Tech (2006)
Fred Tate	Defensive line coach	3rd	Southern Miss (1997)
Mark Tommerdahl	Assistant head coach / special team coordinator	4th	Concordia College (MN) (1983)
Damon Harrington	Head strength & conditioning coach	4th	Louisiana Tech (2000)

=== Roster ===
2016 California Golden Bears Football
Quarterback: 3 Ross Bowers – (redshirt) freshman (6'2, 190); 7 Davis Webb – senior (6'5, 230); 10 Victor Viramontes – freshman (6'1, 240); 14 Chase Forrest – (redshirt) sophomore (6'2, 205); 18 Max Gilliam – freshman (6'2, 205); Running back: 5 Tre Watson – junior (5'10, 195); 22 Derrick Clark – freshman (5'11, 210); 23 Vic Enwere – junior (6'1, 240); 28 Patrick Laird – (redshirt) sophomore (6'0, 205); 29 Khalfani Muhammad – senior (5'9, 175); 30 Billy McCrary III – (redshirt) freshman (5'10, 190); 34 Fabiano Hale – (redshirt) junior (5'11, 210); Wide receiver: 1 Melquise Stovall – freshman (5'9, 190); 2 Jordan Duncan – freshman (6'2, 210); 4 Zion Echols – freshman (5'10, 175); 6 Chad Hansen – (redshirt) junior (6'2, 205); 8 Demetris Robertson – freshman (6'0, 175); 9 Kanawai Noa – sophomore (6'0, 185); 11 Raymond Hudson – (redshirt) junior (6'3, 230); 13 Grayson Bankhead – freshman (5'11, 160); 15 Jordan Veasy – (redshirt) junior (6'3, 225); 17 Vic Wharton III – (redshirt) sophomore (6'0, 200); 19 Brandon Singleton – (redshirt) freshman (6'0, 175); 21 Jack Austin – (redshirt) junior (6'3, 215); 24 Matt Rockett – junior (5'9, 190); 26 Bug Rivera – (redshirt) senior (5'8, 175); 30 Chas Peterson – (redshirt) junior (6'0, 190); 80 Jake Ashton – (redshirt) sophomore (6'4, 220); 81 Logan Gamble – freshman (6'6, 190); 82 Drew Kobayashi – freshman (6'3, 200); 84 Justin Dunn – (redshirt) sophomore (6'2, 210); 86 Eric Locklin – sophomore (6'2, 195); 88 Patrick Worstell – (redshirt) senior (6'2, 195); 89 Matt Laris – freshman (6'4, 220); Tight end / fullback: 40 Justin Norbeck – (redshirt) sophomore (6'2, 235); 45 Kennedy Emesibe – (redshirt) sophomore (6'3, 255); 47 Frank Kapp – (redshirt) freshman (6'3, 225); 85 J.D. Hinnant – (redshirt) junior (6'4, 295); 87 Kyle Wells – (redshirt) sophomore (6'3, 240); 99 Malik McMorris – sophomore (5'11, 310)	Offensive lineman: 54 Gentle Williams – freshman (6'4, 280); 55 Dominic Granado – (redshirt) senior (6'4, 305); 57 Addison Ooms – (redshirt) sophomore (6'4, 295); 58 Semisi Uluave – sophomore (6'5, 345); 62 Dwayne Wallace – (redshirt) junior (6'5, 330); 64 Steven Moore – (redshirt) senior (6'6, 310); 65 Tanner Prenovost – freshman (6'1, 265); 66 Chris Borrayo – (redshirt) senior (6'3, 325); 70 Benji Palu – (redshirt) junior (6'0, 315); 71 Jake Curhan – freshman (6'6, 335); 72 Kamryn Bennett – (redshirt) sophomore (6'3, 295); 73 Jeremiah Stuckey – (redshirt) senior (6'6, 300); 74 Ryan Gibson – (redshirt) freshman (6'1, 285); 75 Aaron Cochran – (redshirt) junior (6'8, 350); 76 Henry Bazakas – (redshirt) freshman (6'6, 295); 79 Patrick Mekari – sophomore (6'4, 295); Daniel Juarez – freshman (6'5, 287); Defensive tackle: 9 James Looney – (redshirt) junior (6'3, 280); 50 Hunter Abel – (redshirt) freshman (6'1, 265); 90 Rusty Becker – junior (6'4, 275); 92 Marcus Manley – (redshirt) senior (6'3, 310); 93 Luc Bequette – (redshirt) freshman (6'1, 290); 96 Tevin Paul – freshman (6'3, 265); 97 Tony Mekari – (redshirt) junior (6'1, 280); 99 Chris Yaghi – freshman (6'4, 269); Defensive end: 13 Russell Ude – (redshirt) freshman (6'3, 265); 33 Noah Westerfield – junior (6'3, 250); 44 Zeandae Johnson – (redshirt) freshman (6'3, 275); 51 Cameron Saffle – sophomore (6'3, 245); 89 Evan Weaver – freshman (6'3, 245); 91 Chinedu Udeogu – freshman (6'5, 255); 94 Trevor Howard – (redshirt) freshman (6'3, 245); 95 DeVante Wilson – (redshirt) senior (6'5, 260); Long snapper: 45 Grant Gluhaich – (redshirt) freshman (5'10, 195); 46 Garrett Frum – (redshirt) junior (6'2, 230); 48 Bradley E. Northnagel – (redshirt) senior (6'3, 245); Punter: 42 Dylan Klumph – (redshirt) sophomore (6'3, 230)	Linebacker: 1 Devante Downs – junior (6'3, 250); 4 Derron Brown – junior (6'1, 205); 11 Hamilton Anoa'i – junior (6'2, 250); 19 Cameron Goode – freshman (6'4, 200); 31 Raymond Davison – (redshirt) junior (6'2, 225); 37 Kaodi Dike – (redshirt) junior (6'2, 210); 38 Alex Netherda – (redshirt) freshman (6'0, 210); 40 David Ortega Jr. – (redshirt) sophomore (5'10, 215); 46 Drew Bryant – (redshirt) sophomore (6'3, 225); 55 Aisea Tongilava – (redshirt) sophomore (6'0, 225); 56 Joe Castignani – (redshirt) sophomore (6'2, 225); 59 Jordan Kunaszyk – junior (6'3, 235); Cornerback: 2 Darius Allensworth – (redshirt) junior (6'0, 190); 8 Nygel Edmonds – freshman (6'0, 195); 14 Antoine Albert – (redshirt) senior (6'1, 190); 14 A.J. Greathouse – junior (6'0, 195); 16 Chibuzo Nwokocha – (redshirt) sophomore (6'1, 205); 18 Marloshawn Franklin Jr. – junior (6'0, 180); 20 Joshua Drayden – freshman (5'11, 175); 24 Camryn Bynum – freshman (6'1, 180); 27 Ashtyn Davis – (redshirt) sophomore (6'1, 185); 39 Ricky Walker III – freshman (5'11, 190); Nickelback: 3 Cameron Walker – senior (5'10, 180); 5 Trey Turner – sophomore (6'0, 195); 22 Traveon Beck – freshman (5'10, 165); 28 Quentin Tartabull – (redshirt) sophomore (5'11, 190); 34 De'Zhon Grace – (redshirt) junior (5'10, 175); Safety: 6 Jaylinn Hawkins – (redshirt) freshman (6'1, 200); 7 Khari Vanderbilt – (redshirt) senior (6'1, 195); 17 Luke Rubenzer – junior (6'0, 195); 21 Evan Rambo – sophomore (6'3, 205); 23 Malik Psalms – (redshirt) freshman (6'2, 185); 32 Jacob Anderson – (redshirt) junior (6'0, 190); 42 David Garner – (redshirt) junior (5'9, 195); Placekicker: 9 Matt Anderson – (redshirt) junior (6'0, 190); 19 Noah Beito – (redshirt) senior (6'0, 190) (+P); 39 Franklyn Cervenka – (redshirt) senior (5'10, 165); 41 Gabe Siemieniec – freshman (6'1, 190); 49 Matt Abramo – (redshirt) freshman (6'2, 185)
Source and player details: California Golden Bears Football 2016 Roster

== Schedule ==
Date	Time	Opponent	Site	TV	Result	Attendance
August 26	7:00 p.m. (Note: Game date and time are listed in Pacific Time; Sydney is on Australian Eastern Time, which at game time was 17 hours ahead of Pacific Time.)	vs. Hawaii*	(Australia) ANZ Stadium; Sydney, Australia (Sydney Cup)	ESPN	W 51–31	61,247
September 10	7:30 p.m.	at San Diego State*	Qualcomm Stadium; San Diego, CA	CBSSN	L 40–45	42,473
September 17	7:30 p.m.	No. 11 Texas*	California Memorial Stadium; Berkeley, CA	ESPN	W 50–43	50,448
September 24	7:00 p.m.	at Arizona State	Sun Devil Stadium; Tempe, AZ	ESPN2	L 41–51	49,295
October 1	3:00 p.m.	No. 18 Utah^{†}	California Memorial Stadium; Berkeley, CA	P12N	W 28–23	46,618
October 8	6:00 p.m.	at Oregon State	Reser Stadium; Corvallis, OR	P12N	L 44–47 ^{OT}	34,066
October 21	7:30 p.m.	Oregon	California Memorial Stadium; Berkeley, CA	ESPN	W 52–49 ^{2OT}	43,048
October 27	7:30 p.m.	at USC	Los Angeles Memorial Coliseum; Los Angeles, CA	ESPN	L 24–45	61,725
November 5	7:30 p.m.	No. 4 Washington	California Memorial Stadium; Berkeley, CA	ESPN	L 27–66	47,756
November 12	7:30 p.m.	at No. 23 Washington State	Martin Stadium; Pullman, WA	ESPN	L 21–56	30,135
November 19	2:30 p.m.	No. 24 Stanford	California Memorial Stadium; Berkeley, CA (Big Game)	P12N	L 31–45	52,266
November 26	4:00 p.m.	UCLA	California Memorial Stadium; Berkeley, CA (rivalry)	ESPN2	W 36–10	39,633
*Non-conference game; ^{†}Homecoming; Rankings from AP Poll released prior to the game; All times are in Pacific time

== Game summaries ==
=== Vs. Hawaii ===
	1	2	3	4	Total
Rainbow Warriors	14	0	10	7	31
Golden Bears	17	17	7	10	51

Statistics	HAW	CAL
First downs	26	31
Total yards	482	630
Rushing yards	248	189
Passing yards	234	441
Turnovers	3	0
Time of possession	29:07	30:53

Team	Category	Player	Statistics
Hawaii	Passing	Ikaika Woolsey	17/34, 234 yards, TD, INT
Hawaii	Rushing	Diocemy Saint Juste	14 rushes, 118 yards, TD
Hawaii	Receiving	Marcus Kemp	4 receptions, 73 yards, TD
California	Passing	Davis Webb	38/54, 441 yards, 4 TD
California	Rushing	Khalfani Muhammad	10 rushes, 96 yards, TD
California	Receiving	Chad Hansen	14 receptions, 160 yards, 2 TD

Calling the game for ESPN: Allen Bestwick, Mike Bellotti and Warren Smith.

=== At San Diego State ===
	1	2	3	4	Total
Golden Bears	14	7	10	9	40
Aztecs	14	17	7	7	45

Statistics	CAL	SDSU
First downs	30	22
Total yards	604	463
Rushing yards	82	334
Passing yards	522	129
Turnovers	4	2
Time of possession	25:30	34:30

Team	Category	Player	Statistics
California	Passing	Davis Webb	41/72, 522 yards, 5 TD, 3 INT
California	Rushing	Vic Enwere	10 rushes, 72 yards
California	Receiving	Chad Hansen	14 receptions, 190 yards, TD
San Diego State	Passing	Christian Chapman	14/23, 129 yards, TD, INT
San Diego State	Rushing	Donnel Pumphrey	29 rushes, 281 yards, 3 TD
San Diego State	Receiving	Eric Judge	4 receptions, 47 yards

=== No. 11 Texas ===
	1	2	3	4	Total
No. 11 Longhorns	17	16	0	10	43
Golden Bears	14	21	0	15	50

Statistics	TEX	CAL
First downs	34	24
Total yards	568	507
Rushing yards	307	111
Passing yards	261	396
Turnovers	2	0
Time of possession	31:47	28:13

Team	Category	Player	Statistics
Texas	Passing	Shane Buechele	19/33, 196 yards, TD, INT
Texas	Rushing	D'Onta Foreman	21 rushes, 157 yards, 2 TD
Texas	Receiving	Armanti Foreman	4 receptions, 72 yards
California	Passing	Davis Webb	27/40, 396 yards, 4 TD
California	Rushing	Vic Enwere	18 rushes, 110 yards, 2 TD
California	Receiving	Chad Hansen	12 receptions, 196 yards, 2 TD

=== At Arizona State ===
	1	2	3	4	Total
Golden Bears	7	17	3	14	41
Sun Devils	3	7	10	31	51

Statistics	CAL	ASU
First downs	29	23
Total yards	637	454
Rushing yards	159	164
Passing yards	478	290
Turnovers	3	1
Time of possession	29:21	30:39

Team	Category	Player	Statistics
California	Passing	Davis Webb	32/56, 478 yards, 5 TD, 2 INT
California	Rushing	Khalfani Muhammad	12 rushes, 84 yards
California	Receiving	Chad Hansen	10 receptions, 110 yards, TD
Arizona State	Passing	Manny Wilkins	21/30, 290 yards, TD, INT
Arizona State	Rushing	Manny Wilkins	23 rushes, 72 yards, 3 TD
Arizona State	Receiving	Tim White	6 receptions, 86 yards

=== No. 18 Utah ===
	1	2	3	4	Total
No. 18 Utes	0	10	7	6	23
Golden Bears	14	0	7	7	28

Statistics	UTAH	CAL
First downs	29	17
Total yards	442	362
Rushing yards	176	56
Passing yards	266	306
Turnovers	0	1
Time of possession	42:01	17:59

Team	Category	Player	Statistics
Utah	Passing	Troy Williams	24/43, 266 yards
Utah	Rushing	Armand Shyne	25 rushes, 99 yards, 2 TD
Utah	Receiving	Raelon Singleton	7 receptions, 98 yards
California	Passing	Davis Webb	22/35, 306 yards, 4 TD, INT
California	Rushing	Tre Watson	4 rushes, 37 yards
California	Receiving	Chad Hansen	5 receptions, 98 yards, 2 TD

=== At Oregon State ===
	1	2	3	4	OT	Total
Golden Bears	0	10	7	24	3	44
Beavers	10	7	17	7	6	47

Statistics	CAL	ORST
First downs	27	27
Total yards	441	559
Rushing yards	317	474
Passing yards	124	85
Turnovers	1	2
Time of possession	26:48	33:12

Team	Category	Player	Statistics
California	Passing	Davis Webb	23/44, 113 yards, INT
California	Rushing	Khalfani Muhammad	21 rushes, 165 yards, TD
California	Receiving	Vic Wharton III	3 receptions, 37 yards
Oregon State	Passing	Darrell Garretson	13/24, 85 yards, 2 INT
Oregon State	Rushing	Ryan Nall	14 rushes, 221 yards, 3 TD
Oregon State	Receiving	Victor Bolden Jr.	4 receptions, 28 yards

=== Oregon ===
	1	2	3	4	OT	2OT	Total
Ducks	0	14	14	14	7	0	49
Golden Bears	14	17	3	8	7	3	52

Statistics	ORE	CAL
First downs	27	40
Total yards	450	636
Rushing yards	192	311
Passing yards	258	325
Turnovers	1	0
Time of possession	23:40	36:20

Team	Category	Player	Statistics
Oregon	Passing	Justin Herbert	22/40, 258 yards, 6 TD, INT
Oregon	Rushing	Tony Brooks-James	15 rushes, 109 yards, TD
Oregon	Receiving	Charles Nelson	7 receptions, 84 yards, 2 TD
California	Passing	Davis Webb	42/61, 325 yards, 5 TD
California	Rushing	Tre Watson	28 rushes, 154 yards
California	Receiving	Vic Wharton III	7 receptions, 55 yards, TD

=== At USC ===
	1	2	3	4	Total
Golden Bears	0	10	7	7	24
Trojans	14	14	14	3	45

Statistics	CAL	USC
First downs	29	31
Total yards	475	629
Rushing yards	142	398
Passing yards	333	231
Turnovers	2	3
Time of possession	28:09	31:51

Team	Category	Player	Statistics
California	Passing	Davis Webb	34/53, 333 yards, 2 TD, INT
California	Rushing	Khalfani Muhammad	15 rushes, 89 yards
California	Receiving	Demetris Robertson	9 receptions, 92 yards
USC	Passing	Sam Darnold	18/25, 231 yards, 5 TD, INT
USC	Rushing	Ronald Jones II	18 rushes, 223 yards, TD
USC	Receiving	Darreus Rogers	6 receptions, 97 yards, 2 TD

=== No. 4 Washington ===
	1	2	3	4	Total
No. 4 Huskies	21	14	21	10	66
Golden Bears	13	7	0	7	27

Statistics	WASH	CAL
First downs	31	18
Total yards	704	362
Rushing yards	287	100
Passing yards	417	262
Turnovers	1	3
Time of possession	35:47	24:13

Team	Category	Player	Statistics
Washington	Passing	Jake Browning	19/28, 378 yards, 6 TD
Washington	Rushing	Lavon Coleman	7 rushes, 108 yards, TD
Washington	Receiving	John Ross III	6 receptions, 208 yards, 3 TD
California	Passing	Davis Webb	23/47, 262 yards, TD, 3 INT
California	Rushing	Khalfani Muhammad	8 rushes, 34 yards
California	Receiving	Demetris Robertson	3 receptions, 82 yards

=== At No. 23 Washington State ===
	1	2	3	4	Total
Golden Bears	0	7	7	7	21
No. 23 Cougars	14	14	7	21	56

Statistics	CAL	WSU
First downs	30	34
Total yards	525	654
Rushing yards	100	254
Passing yards	425	400
Turnovers	1	1
Time of possession	26:14	33:46

Team	Category	Player	Statistics
California	Passing	Davis Webb	34/53, 425 yards, 3 TD, INT
California	Rushing	Tre Watson	15 rushes, 58 yards
California	Receiving	Demetris Robertson	6 receptions, 141 yards, TD
Washington State	Passing	Luke Falk	36/50, 373 yards, 5 TD, INT
Washington State	Rushing	Gerald Wicks	9 rushes, 128 yards, TD
Washington State	Receiving	River Cracraft	9 receptions, 87 yards, 3 TD

=== No. 24 Stanford ===
	1	2	3	4	Total
No. 24 Cardinal	7	10	14	14	45
Golden Bears	7	7	10	7	31

Statistics	STAN	CAL
First downs	24	27
Total yards	555	483
Rushing yards	357	90
Passing yards	198	393
Turnovers	0	0
Time of possession	35:46	24:14

Team	Category	Player	Statistics
Stanford	Passing	Keller Chryst	13/23, 198 yards, 2 TD
Stanford	Rushing	Christian McCaffrey	31 rushes, 284 yards, 3 TD
Stanford	Receiving	J. J. Arcega-Whiteside	4 receptions, 107 yards
California	Passing	Davis Webb	34/57, 393 yards, 2 TD
California	Rushing	Tre Watson	11 rushes, 60 yards, 2 TD
California	Receiving	Chad Hansen	7 receptions, 114 yards, 2 TD

=== UCLA ===
	1	2	3	4	Total
Bruins	0	0	10	0	10
Golden Bears	3	9	14	10	36

Statistics	UCLA	CAL
First downs	11	34
Total yards	260	496
Rushing yards	84	195
Passing yards	176	301
Turnovers	2	0
Time of possession	17:51	42:09

Team	Category	Player	Statistics
UCLA	Passing	Mike Fafaul	12/30, 176 yards, TD, INT
UCLA	Rushing	Nate Starks	11 rushes, 73 yards
UCLA	Receiving	Caleb Wilson	3 receptions, 83 yards
California	Passing	Davis Webb	32/48, 301 yards, 2 TD
California	Rushing	Khalfani Muhammad	29 rushes, 116 yards
California	Receiving	Chad Hansen	10 receptions, 156 yards
