= Chase Garbers =

American football player (born 1999)

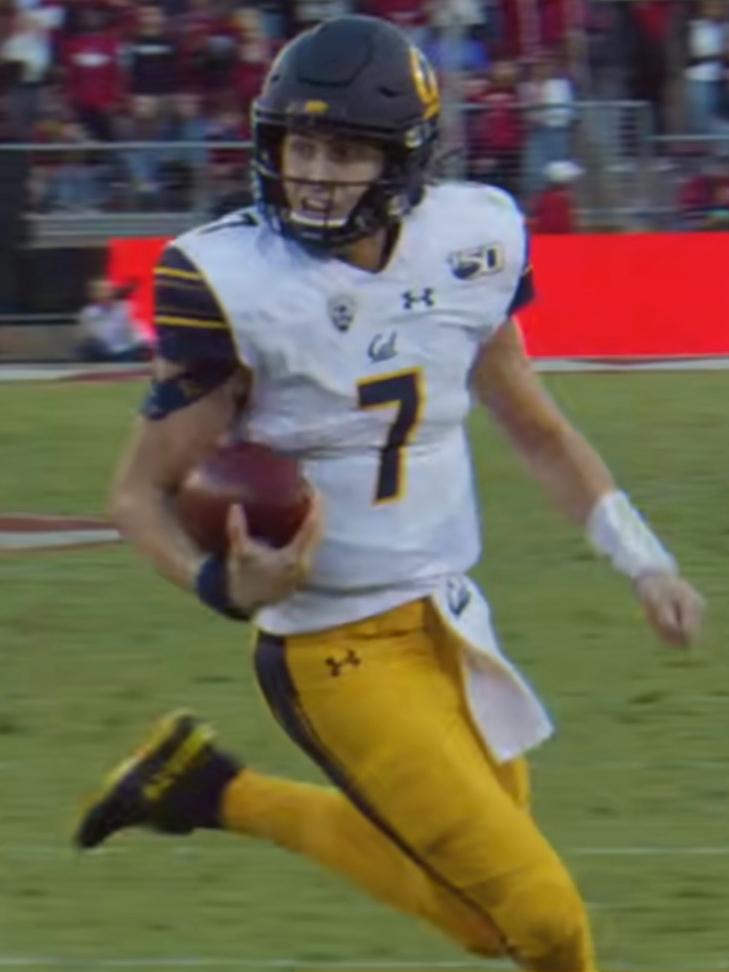
- Garbers with the Cal Golden Bears in 2019

No. 4, 15
- Position: Quarterback

Personal information
- Born: June 6, 1999 (age 27); Newport Beach, California, U.S.
- Listed height: 6 ft 2 in (1.88 m)
- Listed weight: 225 lb (102 kg)

Career information
- High school: Corona del Mar (Newport Beach, California)
- College: California (2017–2021)
- NFL draft: 2022: undrafted

Career history
- Las Vegas Raiders (2022–2023); San Antonio Brahmas (2024)

Career UFL statistics as of Week 3, 2024
- Passing attempts: 106
- Passing completions: 75
- Completion percentage: 70.8
- TD–INT: 5-1
- Passing yards: 586
- QB rating: 99
- Rushing yards: 37
- Rushing touchdowns: 1
- Stats at Pro Football Reference

Chase Garbers (born June 6, 1999) is an American former professional football quarterback. He played college football for the California Golden Bears.

== Early life ==
Garbers attended Corona del Mar High School in Newport Beach, California. He was the full-time starting quarterback in his 2015 junior and 2016 senior campaigns, earning Daily Pilot Dream Team Player of the Year and first-team All-Pacific Coast League honors in both years, while he was also his conference MVP as a senior. Over his high school career, Garbers had a combined 589-of-854 (69.0%) passes for 7,970 yards with 90 touchdowns and 10 interceptions for a 129.1 quarterback rating.

Garbers was listed as four-star recruit, ranked No. 12 pro-style quarterback and No. 315 overall prospect in the country for the 2017 class.

== College career ==
In 2016, Garbers committed to the University of California, Berkeley. He redshirted his first year at California in 2017. Garbers graduated with a B.A. in Political Economy in May 2021, then went on to earn a graduate certificate in business administration in December 2021.

=== 2018 season ===
In 2018, Garbers shared Cal's starting quarterback position with Brandon McIlwain in a two-quarterback system, though Garbers started the majority of the season. In his first career start, Garbers completed 18 of 28 passes for 171 yards and two touchdowns against BYU.

Garbers led the Bears to their first victory against USC since 2003, winning 15-14 on the road. Garbers threw for 93 yards and one touchdown and rushed for another touchdown after falling behind 0-14 in the first half.

The Bears finished the 2018 season with a 7–6 record, including a loss at the Cheez-It Bowl against the TCU Horned Frogs. Struggling to find a rhythm on offense, the Bears' offensive efficiency ranked as the second worst among all Power Five teams. Garbers finished the season with 14 touchdowns, 10 interceptions, and 1,506 yards passing.

=== 2019 season ===
In 2019, Garbers was named Cal's starting quarterback. He helped lead the Bears to a 4–0 start to the season, including a 20–19 upset win against No. 14 ranked Washington, earning the Bears a No. 15 ranking, their highest since 2009. Garbers had career highs in completions, yards passing, and touchdown passes in the Ole Miss game with 23-of-35 passes for 357 yards with four touchdown throws.

Garbers suffered a broken collarbone during the Arizona State game that sidelined him for the next five games, four of which were losses. He returned briefly for the USC game, but sustained a concussion close to the end of the first half.

Garbers returned to lead the Bears to a 24–20 win against Stanford in the Big Game, the first Big Game win for Cal since 2009. Garbers ran for a 16-yard game-winning touchdown, earning praise from Green Bay Packers quarterback and former Cal quarterback Aaron Rodgers. This win clinched bowl eligibility for the Bears while making the Cardinal ineligible for the post-season for the first time in ten years.

The Bears went to the Redbox Bowl, where they won against the Illinois Fighting Illini 35–20, their first bowl win since 2015. Garbers had a career best-tying 4 touchdowns and was named Offensive MVP for the game. The Bears finished the 2019 season with an 8–5 record (4–5 in Pac-12 play), with Garbers going undefeated in the seven games in which he started and finished.

=== 2020 season ===
Garbers entered his redshirt junior season on the Johnny Unitas Golden Arm Award Preseason Watch List. Due to the COVID-19 pandemic, the Pac-12 had a seven-game Conference-only lineup for the 2020 season. However, the Bears were ultimately only able to play four games for the season due to game cancellations. Garbers started the season 0–3, losing to UCLA, Oregon State, and Stanford. The Bears achieved their sole win in their last game against Oregon on December 5, ending the season with a 1–3 record.

=== 2021 season ===
Garbers entered his redshirt senior season as the starting quarterback. On November 6, 2021, Garbers was declared inactive for Cal's game versus Arizona on November 6, 2021, due to COVID-19, and the Bears were forced to postpone their game the following week for the same reason. On November 20, Garbers returned from COVID to lead the Bears to a 41–11 rout of rival Stanford, opening the game with an 84-yard pass to tight end Trevon Clark for the longest pass in the series history. Under Garbers, the Bears set a series record 636 yards of offense, and Garbers became the first Cal quarterback to win back-to-back road games at Stanford in 99 years, since Charles Erb in 1921 and 1922.

=== Statistics ===
Season	Team	Games			Passing								Rushing			
Season	Team	GP	GS	Record	Cmp	Att	Pct	Yds	Avg	Y/G	TD	Int	Att	Yds	Avg	TD
2017	California	0	0	0−0	(redshirt) Redshirted											
2018	California	12	9	6−3	159	260	61.2	1,506	5.8	125.5	14	10	98	420	4.3	2
2019	California	9	9	7−2	131	215	60.9	1,772	8.2	196.9	14	3	90	223	2.5	3
2020	California	4	4	1−3	85	136	62.5	771	5.7	192.8	6	3	39	75	1.9	2
2021	California	11	11	5−6	223	348	64.5	2,531	7.3	230.1	16	8	104	456	4.4	4
Totals		36	33	19−14	598	959	62.4	6,580	6.8	182.8	50	24	331	1,174	3.5	11

== Professional career ==
Pre-draft measurables
Height	Weight	Arm length	Hand span	40-yard dash	10-yard split	20-yard split	Vertical jump	Broad jump
6 ft 1 7/8 in (1.88 m)	215 lb (98 kg)	30 5/8 in (0.78 m)	9 1/4 in (0.23 m)	4.83 s	1.56 s	2.79 s	32.0 in (0.81 m)	9 ft 4 in (2.84 m)
All values from Pro Day

=== Las Vegas Raiders ===
Garbers signed with the Las Vegas Raiders as an undrafted free agent on May 12, 2022. He was waived on August 30, 2022, and signed to the practice squad the next day. On December 31, 2022, with two regular season games remaining, Garbers was promoted to the active roster to backup quarterback to new starter Jarrett Stidham, after Derek Carr was benched for the remainder of the season. Garbers was released on July 25, 2023. He was re-signed by the Las Vegas Raiders a week later. He was again released by the Las Vegas Raiders on August 27, 2023.

=== San Antonio Brahmas ===
On January 19, 2024, Garbers signed with the San Antonio Brahmas of the United Football League (UFL). He was named the starting quarterback on March 15, beating out former Orlando Guardians quarterback Quinten Dormady. On his UFL debut, Garbers led the Brahmas to a 27-12 victory over the D.C. Defenders, throwing for 158 yards completing 19 out of 25 attempts for two touchdowns and no interceptions, including one rushing touchdown. He was placed on injured reserve on April 15. Garbers was activated on May 20.

On January 13, 2025, Garbers was released by the Brahmas.

== Personal ==
Garbers' younger brother, Ethan, became a college quarterback for the UCLA Bruins.
