= Chris Brooks (running back) =

American football player (born 2000)

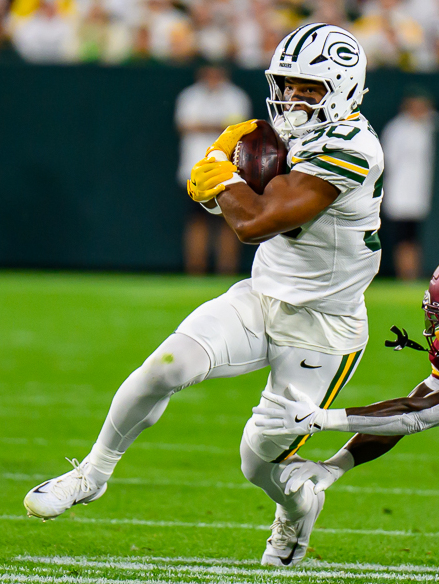
- Brooks with the Green Bay Packers in 2025

No. 30 – Green Bay Packers
- Position: Running back
- Roster status: Active

Personal information
- Born: January 11, 2000 (age 26); Oceanside, California, U.S.
- Listed height: 6 ft 1 in (1.85 m)
- Listed weight: 219 lb (99 kg)

Career information
- High school: El Camino (Oceanside)
- College: California (2018–2021); BYU (2022)
- NFL draft: 2023: undrafted

Career history
- Miami Dolphins (2023); Green Bay Packers (2024–present)

Career NFL statistics as of Week 10, 2026
- Rushing yards: 466
- Rushing average: 4.7
- Rushing touchdowns: 1
- Receptions: 28
- Receiving yards: 186
- Stats at Pro Football Reference

Christopher Brooks (born Brown, January 11, 2000) is an American professional football running back for the Green Bay Packers of the National Football League (NFL). He played college football for the California Golden Bears and BYU Cougars.

== Early life ==
Brooks is the son of Christopher Brown Sr and Raquel Brooks. Brooks attended El Camino High School in Oceanside, California. He was a four-star recruit according to 247Sports and the 12th best running back in the state of California. During high school, he was also a member of the school's track and field team, qualifying for the California State Meet in the long jump as a 2018 senior.

== College career ==
=== California ===
As a true freshman at the University of California, Berkeley, Christopher Brooks (formerly known as Christopher Brown), appeared in all 13 of the Golden Bears games off the bench. After running back Patrick Laird was injured in the first half of the 2018 Cheez-It Bowl against TCU, Brooks took over as the team's primary running back, totaling 71 all-purpose yards on 14 carries and three receptions.

As a sophomore, Brooks posted career highs in carries (208), rushing yards (914), rushing touchdowns (8), receptions (22), receiving yards (166) and receiving touchdowns (4).

In 2020, Brooks was hindered by injuries, appearing in only three games (two starts).

In his senior season, Brooks rushed for 607 yards and six touchdowns, averaging a Cal career-best 5.2 yards per carry. On December 6, 2021, he entered the transfer portal.

=== BYU ===
Brooks transferred to Brigham Young University for the 2022 season. He appeared in 11 games, starting eight, while averaging 6.28 yards per carry, fourth best all time in Cougars' history. On November 26, 2022, Brooks rushed for a BYU career-best 23 carries and 164 yards in a 35–26 win over Stanford. At the 2023 Hula Bowl in Orlando, Brooks totaled 101 all-purpose yards and was named the game's offensive MVP.

== Professional career ==
Pre-draft measurables
| Height | Weight | Arm length | Hand span | Wingspan | 40-yard dash | 10-yard split | 20-yard split | 20-yard shuttle | Three-cone drill | Vertical jump | Broad jump | Bench press |
|---|---|---|---|---|---|---|---|---|---|---|---|---|
| 6 ft 0 3/4 in (1.85 m) | 219 lb (99 kg) | 31 in (0.79 m) | 8 1/2 in (0.22 m) | 6 ft 3 1/2 in (1.92 m) | 4.63 s | 1.62 s | 2.65 s | 4.35 s | 7.13 s | 37.0 in (0.94 m) | 10 ft 2 in (3.10 m) | 21 reps |
All values from Pro Day

=== Miami Dolphins ===
On April 29, 2023, Brooks signed with the Miami Dolphins as an undrafted free agent. Brooks made the Dolphins' final roster. He was placed on injured reserve on October 20. Brooks was activated on December 19.

Brooks was released by the Dolphins on September 2, 2024, with an injury settlement.

=== Green Bay Packers ===
Brooks was signed by the Green Bay Packers to their practice squad on September 3, 2024. He was signed to the Packers' active roster on September 17. In Week 16 against the New Orleans Saints, Brooks scored his first career touchdown on a one-yard rush. In 15 total games for Green Bay, he rushed 36 times for 183 yards, and had 11 receptions for 69 yards.

On March 4, 2026, Brooks re-signed with the Packers. He was placed on injured reserve on October 10, 2026. He was activated on November 14.

== Career statistics ==
=== NFL ===
Legend
| **Bold** | Career high |

==== Regular season ====
| Year | Team | Games | | Rushing | | | | | Receiving | | | | | Fumbles | |
| Year | Team | GP | GS | Att | Yds | Avg | Lng | TD | Rec | Yds | Avg | Lng | TD | Fum | Lost |
|---|---|---|---|---|---|---|---|---|---|---|---|---|---|---|---|
| 2023 | MIA | 9 | 0 | 19 | 106 | **5.6** | **52** | 0 | 0 | 0 | 0 | 0 | 0 | 0 | 0 |
| 2024 | GB | 15 | 0 | **36** | **183** | 5.1 | 23 | **1** | 11 | 69 | **6.3** | 15 | 0 | 0 | 0 |
| 2025 | GB | **17** | 0 | 27 | 106 | 3.9 | 12 | 0 | **13** | **91** | 7.0 | **16** | 0 | 0 | 0 |
| Career | | 41 | 0 | 82 | 395 | 4.8 | 52 | 1 | 102 | 160 | 6.7 | 16 | 0 | 0 | 0 |
Source: pro-football-reference.com

==== Postseason ====
| Year | Team | Games | | Rushing | | | | | Receiving | | | | | Fumbles | |
| Year | Team | GP | GS | Att | Yds | Avg | Lng | TD | Rec | Yds | Avg | Lng | TD | Fum | Lost |
|---|---|---|---|---|---|---|---|---|---|---|---|---|---|---|---|
| 2023 | MIA | 1 | 0 | 0 | 0 | 0.0 | 0 | 0 | 0 | 0 | 0.0 | 0 | 0 | 0 | 0 |
| 2024 | GB | 1 | 0 | 0 | 0 | 0.0 | 0 | 0 | 2 | 9 | 4.5 | 5 | 0 | 0 | 0 |
| 2025 | GB | 1 | 0 | 1 | 16 | 16.0 | 16 | 0 | 1 | 11 | 11.0 | 11 | 0 | 0 | 0 |
| Total | | 3 | 0 | 1 | 16 | 16.0 | 16 | 0 | 3 | 20 | 6.7 | 11 | 0 | 0 | 0 |
Source: pro-football-reference.com

=== College ===
| Year | Team | Games | | Rushing | | | | Receiving | | | |
| Year | Team | GP | GS | Att | Yards | Avg | TD | Rec | Yards | Avg | TD |
|---|---|---|---|---|---|---|---|---|---|---|---|
| 2018 | California | **13** | 0 | 37 | 148 | 4.0 | 1 | 5 | 31 | 6.2 | 0 |
| 2019 | California | **13** | **12** | **208** | **914** | 4.4 | **8** | **22** | **166** | 7.5 | **4** |
| 2020 | California | 3 | 2 | 21 | 65 | 3.1 | 1 | 4 | 17 | 4.3 | 0 |
| 2021 | California | 12 | 4 | 116 | 607 | 5.2 | 4 | 19 | 131 | 6.9 | 3 |
| 2022 | BYU | 11 | 8 | 130 | 817 | **6.3** | 6 | 10 | 98 | **9.8** | 0 |
| Career | | 52 | 26 | 512 | 2,551 | 5.0 | 20 | 60 | 443 | 7.4 | 7 |
Source: sports-reference.com

== Personal life ==
In 2021, Brooks changed his last name from "Brown" to his mother's maiden name.
