= Evan Weaver =

American football player (born 1998)

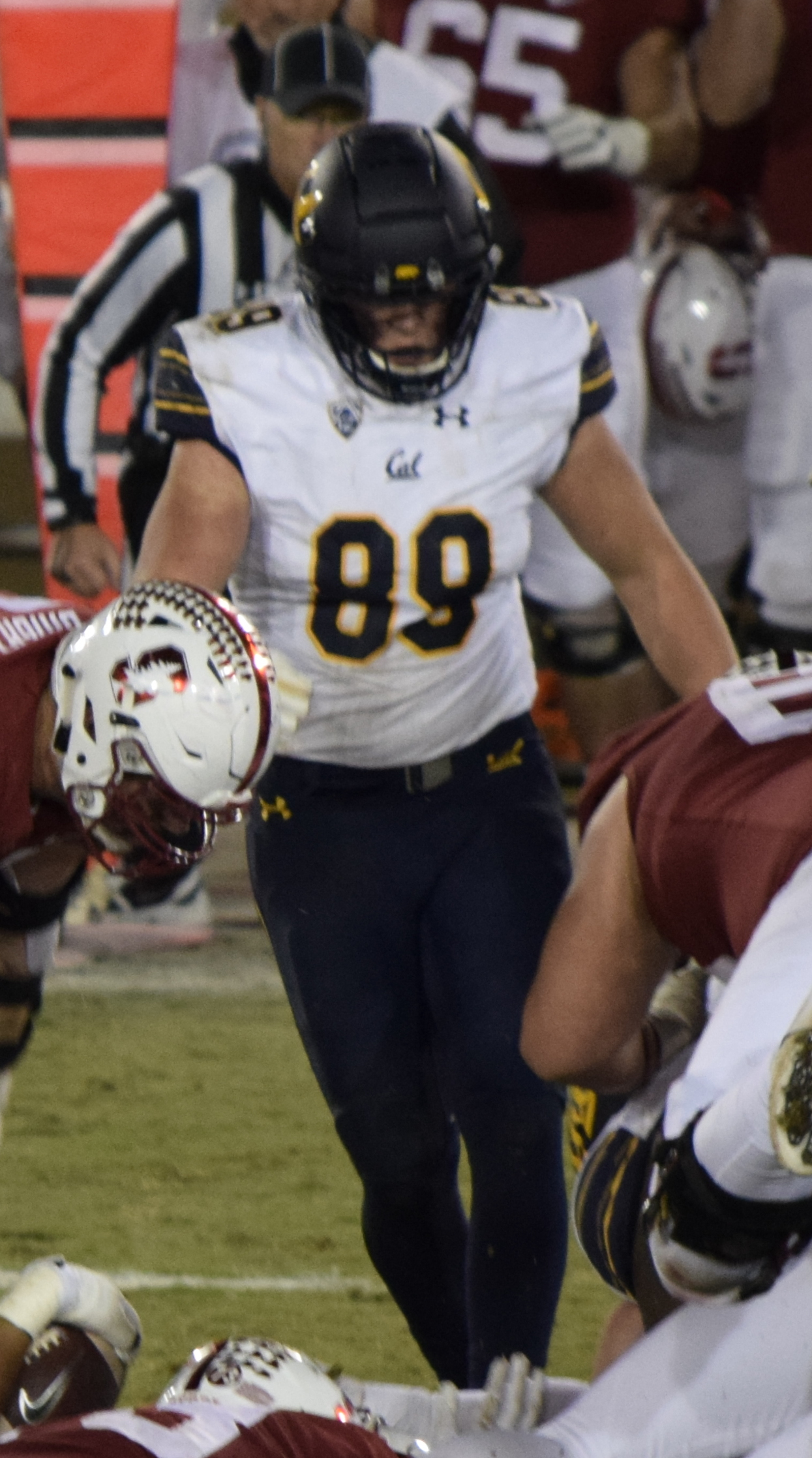
- Weaver with the Cal Golden Bears in 2017

No. 50
- Position: Linebacker

Personal information
- Born: August 11, 1998 (age 28); Spokane, Washington, U.S.
- Listed height: 6 ft 3 in (1.91 m)
- Listed weight: 235 lb (107 kg)

Career information
- High school: Gonzaga Prep (Spokane)
- College: California (2016–2019)
- NFL draft: 2020: 6th round, 202nd overall pick

Career history
- Arizona Cardinals (2020)*
- * Offseason or practice squad member only

Awards and highlights
- Unanimous All-American (2019); Pac-12 Defensive Player of the Year (2019); First-team All-Pac-12 (2019); Second-team All-Pac-12 (2018)
- Stats at Pro Football Reference

Evan Weaver (born August 11, 1998) is an American former college football player who was a linebacker for the California Golden Bears. He was a Unanimous All-American as a senior in 2019. He was selected by the Arizona Cardinals in the sixth round of the 2020 NFL draft, but never played in an NFL game.

== Early life ==
Weaver was born and raised in Spokane, Washington and attended Gonzaga Preparatory School, where he played baseball and football. He attended grade school at Cataldo Catholic School, located in South Spokane. He was named first-team All-State and the Inland Northwest Defensive MVP after making 123 tackles, 36 for a loss, with 14 sacks and six forced fumbles. Rated a three-star prospect by most recruiting services, Weaver committed to play college football at California over offers from Arizona, Boise State, Oregon, Utah, Washington and Washington State. As a senior, Weaver was named the State Defensive Player of the Year after recording 125 tackles, 1 int, 5 forced fumbles, 37 tackles for loss, 24 sacks, and two safeties. He finished his high school career with 393 tackles, 78.0 tackles for loss, 45.0 sacks, and 14 forced fumbles. Weaver also played as a running back his senior year in the 2015 season, and scored the third and fourth touchdown for Gonzaga Prep in the WIAA 2015 Championship against Skyline, where he rushed for a net gain of 133 yards, with his longest run being 24 yards. Although he played baseball in high school, he opted out his senior year once he made his college commitment.

== College career ==
Weaver played in 11 games as a true freshman as a reserve defensive end, making 16 tackles with 1.5 sacks. Weaver moved from defensive end to outside linebacker during spring camp and then moved to inside linebacker going into his sophomore year. He became a starter midway through the season and finished with 55 tackles, two for loss, and two passes broken up.

As a junior, Weaver started all 13 of the Golden Bears games and led the Football Bowl Subdivision with 159 tackles (9.5 for loss) with 4.5 sacks, two interceptions, and six passes broken up. He was named the Pac-12 Conference player of the week on October 29, 2018 for an 11-tackle (one for loss) performance with a pass broken up and an interception return for a touchdown in Cal's 12-10 upset of #15 Washington. Weaver was named a second-team All-American by Pro Football Focus, first-team All-Pac-12 by the Associated Press (AP) and second-team All-Pac-12 by the league's coaches.

Weaver entered his senior season on the watchlists for the Butkus Award and the Bronko Nagurski Trophy. He was named a midseason All-American by the AP and CBS Sports. At the end of the season, Weaver was named the Pac-12 Defensive Player of the Year and earned first-team All-Pac-12 honors after leading the nation with a school-record and Pac-12-record 182 tackles. He also became the first Cal player to earn unanimous first-team All-American honors since Daymeion Hughes and DeSean Jackson in 2006.

=== College statistics ===
| Year | Games | Tackles | | | | Interceptions | | | | | | Fumbles | |
| Year | Games | Comb | Total | Ast | Sck | PDef | Int | Yds | Avg | Lng | TD | FF | FR |
|---|---|---|---|---|---|---|---|---|---|---|---|---|---|
| 2016 | 11 | 16 | 9 | 7 | 1.5 | 0 | 0 | 0 | 0 | 0 | 0 | 0 | 0 |
| 2017 | 12 | 55 | 30 | 25 | 0 | 2 | 0 | 0 | 0 | 0 | 0 | 0 | 0 |
| 2018 | 13 | 155 | 88 | 67 | 4.5 | 6 | 2 | 47 | 23.5 | 37 | 1 | 0 | 0 |
| 2019 | 13 | 182 | 104 | 78 | 2.5 | 3 | 0 | 0 | 0 | 0 | 0 | 3 | 0 |
| Career | 49 | 384 | 213 | 171 | 8.5 | 11 | 2 | 47 | 23.5 | 37 | 1 | 3 | 0 |

== Professional career ==
Pre-draft measurables
| Height | Weight | Arm length | Hand span | 40-yard dash | 10-yard split | 20-yard split | 20-yard shuttle | Three-cone drill | Vertical jump | Broad jump | Bench press |
|---|---|---|---|---|---|---|---|---|---|---|---|
| 6 ft 2 1/8 in (1.88 m) | 237 lb (108 kg) | 31 5/8 in (0.80 m) | 9 7/8 in (0.25 m) | 4.76 s | 1.62 s | 2.78 s | 4.21 s | 7.02 s | 32.0 in (0.81 m) | 9 ft 9 in (2.97 m) | 15 reps |
All values from NFL Combine

Weaver was selected by the Arizona Cardinals in the sixth round with the 202nd overall pick of the 2020 NFL draft. He was waived on September 5, 2020. He was re-signed to the practice squad a day later. He signed a reserve/future contract on January 5, 2021. He was waived on August 30, 2021.

== See also ==
- List of NCAA major college football yearly tackles leaders
