= Patrick Laird =

American football player (born 1995)

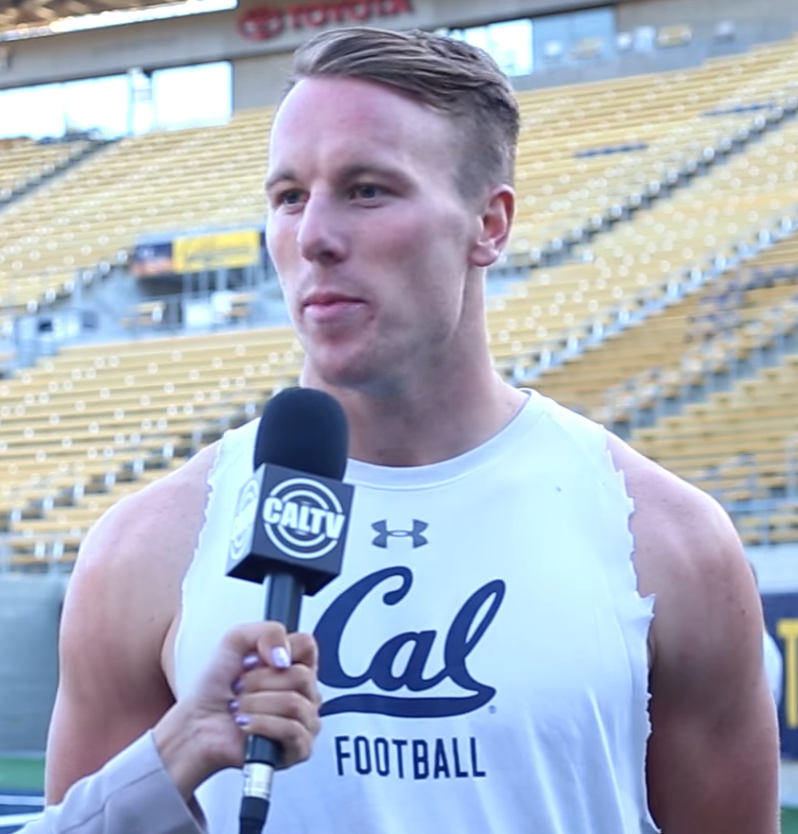
- Laird with Cal in 2017

Profile
- Position: Running back

Personal information
- Born: August 17, 1995 (age 31); San Luis Obispo, California, U.S.
- Listed height: 6 ft 0 in (1.83 m)
- Listed weight: 205 lb (93 kg)

Career information
- High school: Mission Prep (San Luis Obispo)
- College: California (2014–2018)
- NFL draft: 2019: undrafted

Career history
- Miami Dolphins (2019–2021); Tampa Bay Buccaneers (2022–2023)

Career NFL statistics
- Rushing yards: 244
- Rushing average: 3.2
- Rushing touchdowns: 1
- Receptions: 36
- Receiving yards: 289
- Stats at Pro Football Reference

Patrick Michael Laird (born August 17, 1995) is an American professional football running back. He played college football for the California Golden Bears and pro football with the Miami Dolphins and Tampa Bay Buccaneers. After his playing career, he became a pre-game studio analyst for the Cal Bears radio broadcast.

== Early life ==
Laird attended Mission College Preparatory High School in San Luis Obispo, California. As a senior, he rushed for 3,117 yards and 32 touchdowns on 408 carries for an average of 7.6 yards per rush.

== College career ==
Laird began his college career at the University of California, Berkeley, in 2014 as a walk-on. He redshirted his second year with the Golden Bears in 2015. In his second year of eligibility in 2016, he received second-team Pac-12 Conference All-Academic honors.

=== 2017 season ===
As a junior in 2017, he played in 11 games and rushed 191 times for 1,127 yards and 8 touchdowns. He is the sixteenth player in Cal history to rush for over 1,000 yards in a single season. Laird's 214 yards rushing against Oregon State in 2017 ranks tenth in program history for rushing yards in a single game.

He received first-team Pac-12 All-Academic honors, All-Pac-12 Honorable Mention, and was named a semifinalist for the Burlsworth Trophy, which is awarded annually to the nation's most outstanding college football player who began his career as a walk-on.

=== 2018 season ===
As a senior in 2018, he played in 11 games and rushed 197 times for 816 yards and 5 touchdowns.

Laird was a Finalist for the Burlsworth Trophy and the Senior CLASS Award. He was also named a semi-finalist for the Campbell Trophy.

While at California, Laird began a summer reading program, inspiring over 1,000 elementary school students to read at least four books a summer.

=== Statistics ===
| Season | Rushing | | | | | |
| Season | GP | Att | Yds | Avg | TD | Y/G |
|---|---|---|---|---|---|---|
| 2014 | 5 | 3 | 6 | 2.0 | 0 | 1.2 |
| 2015 | 0 | Redshirted | | | | |
| 2016 | 12 | 8 | 59 | 7.4 | 1 | 4.9 |
| 2017 | 11 | 191 | 1,127 | 5.9 | 8 | 102.5 |
| 2018 | 11 | 197 | 816 | 4.1 | 5 | 74.2 |
| Totals | 39 | 399 | 2,008 | 5.0 | 14 | 51.5 |

== Professional career ==
Pre-draft measurables
| Height | Weight | Arm length | Hand span | 40-yard dash | 10-yard split | 20-yard split | 20-yard shuttle | Three-cone drill | Vertical jump | Broad jump |
|---|---|---|---|---|---|---|---|---|---|---|
| 5 ft 11 1/2 in (1.82 m) | 205 lb (93 kg) | 30 in (0.76 m) | 9 3/8 in (0.24 m) | 4.56 s | 1.55 s | 2.64 s | 4.14 s | 6.90 s | 34.0 in (0.86 m) | 10 ft 0 in (3.05 m) |
All values from Pro Day

=== Miami Dolphins ===
Laird went undrafted in the 2019 NFL draft, and signed with the Miami Dolphins as an undrafted free agent.

Laird gained the nickname "The Intern" after he was mistaken for being an intern during training camp.

Laird scored his first career touchdown in a 37–31 upset over the Philadelphia Eagles in Week 13. Overall, Laird finished the 2019 season with 62 carries for 168 yards and one touchdown to go along with 23 receptions for 204 yards.

On August 31, 2021, Laird was waived by the Dolphins and re-signed to the practice squad the next day. He was promoted to the active roster on October 30, 2021. He was placed on injured reserve on December 8, 2021.

=== Tampa Bay Buccaneers ===
On August 15, 2022, Laird signed with the Tampa Bay Buccaneers. He was waived on August 30, 2022, and signed to the practice squad the next day. He signed a reserve/future contract on January 17, 2023.

On August 29, 2023, Laird was released by the Buccaneers and re-signed to the practice squad. He signed a reserve/future contract on January 23, 2024, but was released on May 22.
