= Burl Toler III =

American football player and coach (born 1983)

Burl Toler
Personal information
- Born: April 7, 1983 (age 43); Berkeley, California, U.S.
- Listed height: 6 ft 2 in (1.88 m)
- Listed weight: 196 lb (89 kg)

Career information
- Position: Wide receiver (No. 81)
- High school: Oakland (CA) Bishop O'Dowd
- College: California
- NFL draft: 2006: undrafted

Career history

Playing
- Oakland Raiders (2006)*; San Jose SaberCats (2007)*; Cologne Centurions (2007); Washington Redskins (2007–2008)*; San Jose SaberCats (2011); Orlando Predators (2012)*; San Antonio Talons (2012)
- * Offseason or practice squad member only

Coaching
- California (2013–2015) Special teams quality control coach; Fresno State (2016) Wide receivers coach; UC Davis (2017) Wide receivers coach; California (2018) Running backs coach; California (2019–2024) Wide receivers coach; UCLA (2025) Wide receivers coach, pass game coordinator, recruiting coordinator

Career AFL statistics
- Receptions: 96
- Receiving yards: 1,157
- Receiving touchdowns: 21
- Total tackles: 18.5
- Forced fumbles: 1
- Stats at ArenaFan.com

Burl Tamayo Toler III (born April 7, 1983) is an American football coach and former wide receiver. He most recently was the wide receivers coach for the UCLA Bruins. He was originally signed by the Oakland Raiders as an undrafted free agent in 2006. He played college football at Cal. After serving as the wide receiver coach at Cal from 2019–2024, Toller III was named the pass game coordinator, recruiting coordinator, and wide receivers coach for the UCLA football program by head coach DeShaun Foster on Dec. 20, 2024.

== Early life ==
Toler attended Bishop O'Dowd High School. He helped his team win the league championship in his sophomore and junior years and won the NCS Championship during his sophomore season. He earned First-team All-League on offense and defense as a senior. He also lettered in track all four years and attended the League of Champions meet in his final three years.

== College career ==
Toler, like his father was a walk-on at Cal. As a senior, he was the team's leading receiver with 61 receptions for 795 yards (13.0 avg.) and three touchdowns.

== Professional career ==
=== National Football League (2006) ===
Toler went unselected in the 2006 NFL draft. Later, he was signed as an undrafted free agent by the Oakland Raiders on May 10, 2006. He spent all of training camp and the preseason with the Raiders. He was signed to their practice squad on September 4, 2006. However, the team released him on September 12, 2006.

=== Arena Football League (2007) ===
In late 2006, Toler signed with the San Jose SaberCats of the Arena Football League. However, he never played for them as he played for the Cologne Centurions of NFL Europe.

=== National Football League (2007) ===
In 2007, Toler signed with the Washington Redskins and spent training camp and the preseason with the team before being released on September 1, 2007. Two days later, he signed to the team's practice squad. However, he was released again on September 11, only to be re-signed on November 13. He was released again, a week later. He was then re-signed to the Redskins practice squad on November 28, and spent the rest of the season there.

=== Arena Football League (2008–2012) ===
Toler then re-joined the SaberCats, however he did not play for them in 2008, as he re-signed with the Redskins on January 9, 2008, and spent the AFL season at the Redskins training camp. He was released by the Redskins again on August 20, 2008.

On September 22, 2008, Toler was activated by the SaberCats.

On April 8, 2009, Toler signed a short-term deal with the Bologna Doves of the Italian Football League.

== Personal ==
Toler's father, Burl Jr., was also a walk-on at Cal and a two-year starter at linebacker in the mid-1970s. His grandfather, Burl Toler, was an All-American at the University of San Francisco in 1951 and later became the National Football League’s first African-American official. After being released by the Washington Redskins, Toler III was a substitute teacher.

Toler and his wife, Drea, have a daughter named Laleaga and a son named Burl IV.
