= Brandon McIlwain =

American baseball player (born 1998)

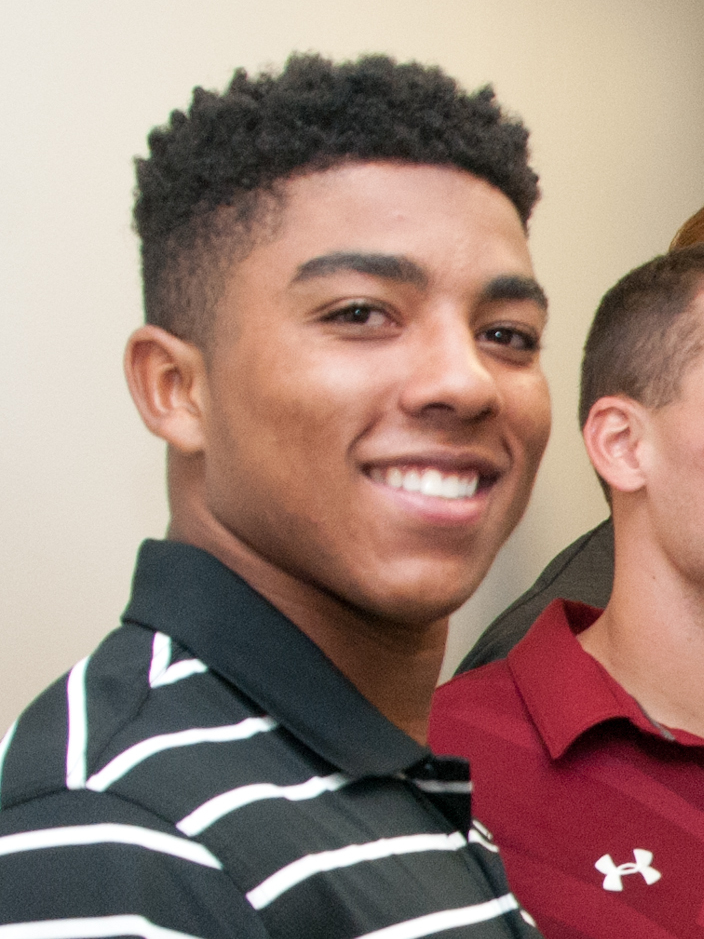
- McIlwain in 2016

Grosseto Baseball Club – No. 2
- Outfielder
- Born: May 31, 1998 (age 28); Newtown, Pennsylvania, U.S.
- Bats: Right Throws: Right

Brandon Fitzgerald McIlwain (born May 31, 1998) is an American professional baseball outfielder for the Grosseto Baseball Club of the Italian Baseball League (IBL). A multi-sport athlete, he played both college baseball and college football at the University of South Carolina and the University of California, Berkeley.

== High school career ==
McIlwain attended Council Rock High School North in Newtown, Bucks County, Pennsylvania. He played both baseball and football in high school. During his high school football career, he had 10,157 yards (6,480 passing, 3,677 rushing) of total offense and 123 total touchdowns (56 passing, 67 rushing). McIlwain committed to the University of South Carolina to play college football and college baseball. He was also a top prospect for the 2016 Major League Baseball draft, but opted to attend college.

== College career ==
=== Football ===
As a true freshman at South Carolina in 2016, McIlwain played in eight games and made three starts. He made his first career start against East Carolina University, throwing for 195 yards and rushing for 34 with two touchdowns. He finished the year with 600 passing yards with two passing touchdowns and one interception and 127 rushing yards with two touchdowns. McIlwain redshirted in 2017.

McIlwain transferred to the University of California, Berkeley in 2017. After sitting out his first year due to transfer rules, he played in 10 games with two starts in 2018. For the season, he passed for 763 yards with two touchdowns and eight interceptions and added 403 rushing yards with four touchdowns. He left the football team in 2019 to focus on his baseball career.

=== Baseball ===
As a freshman baseball player in 2016, McIlwain played in eight games and had one hit in 10 at-bats. He played in only one game in 2017, before announcing his transfer to Cal. After not playing his first year due to transfer rules, McIlwain played in 20 games in 2019 and hit .258/.309/.436 with two home runs in 62 at-bats. He was drafted by the Miami Marlins in the 26th round of the 2019 MLB draft, but did not sign and returned to Cal. In his final season in 2020, McIlwain hit .200/.333/.273 with one home run over 55 at-bats in 16 games during the shortened season caused by the COVID-19 pandemic.

== Professional career ==
=== New York Mets ===
McIlwain signed with the New York Mets as an undrafted free agent after the 2020 Major League Baseball draft. He did not play in a game in 2020 due to the cancellation of the minor league season because of the COVID-19 pandemic.

McIlwain made his professional debut in 2021 with the Single–A St. Lucie Mets, hitting .255/.362/.398 with seven home runs, 40 RBI, and eight stolen bases across 74 contests. He split 2022 between the High–A Brooklyn Cyclones and Double–A Binghamton Rumble Ponies, batting .255/.345/.391 with seven home runs, 33 RBI, and 15 stolen bases across 99 combined games. After the season, McIlwain played in the Arizona Fall League.

McIlwain split the 2023 campaign between Binghamton and the Triple–A Syracuse Mets. In 128 total games, he accumulated a .247/.356/.393 with career–highs in home runs (12), RBI (70), and stolen bases (20). McIlwain began 2024 with Binghamton, hitting .224/.306/.342 with three home runs, nine RBI, and six stolen bases. He was released by the Mets organization on June 23, 2024.

=== Washington Wild Things ===
On July 3, 2024, McIlwain signed with the Washington Wild Things of the Frontier League. In 46 appearances for the Wild Things, McIlwain batted .300/.375/.538 with eight home runs, 29 RBI, and 10 stolen bases.

=== Grosseto Baseball Club ===
On January 17, 2025, McIlwain signed with the Grosseto Baseball Club of the Italian Baseball League.
