= Jordan Kunaszyk =

American football player (born 1996)

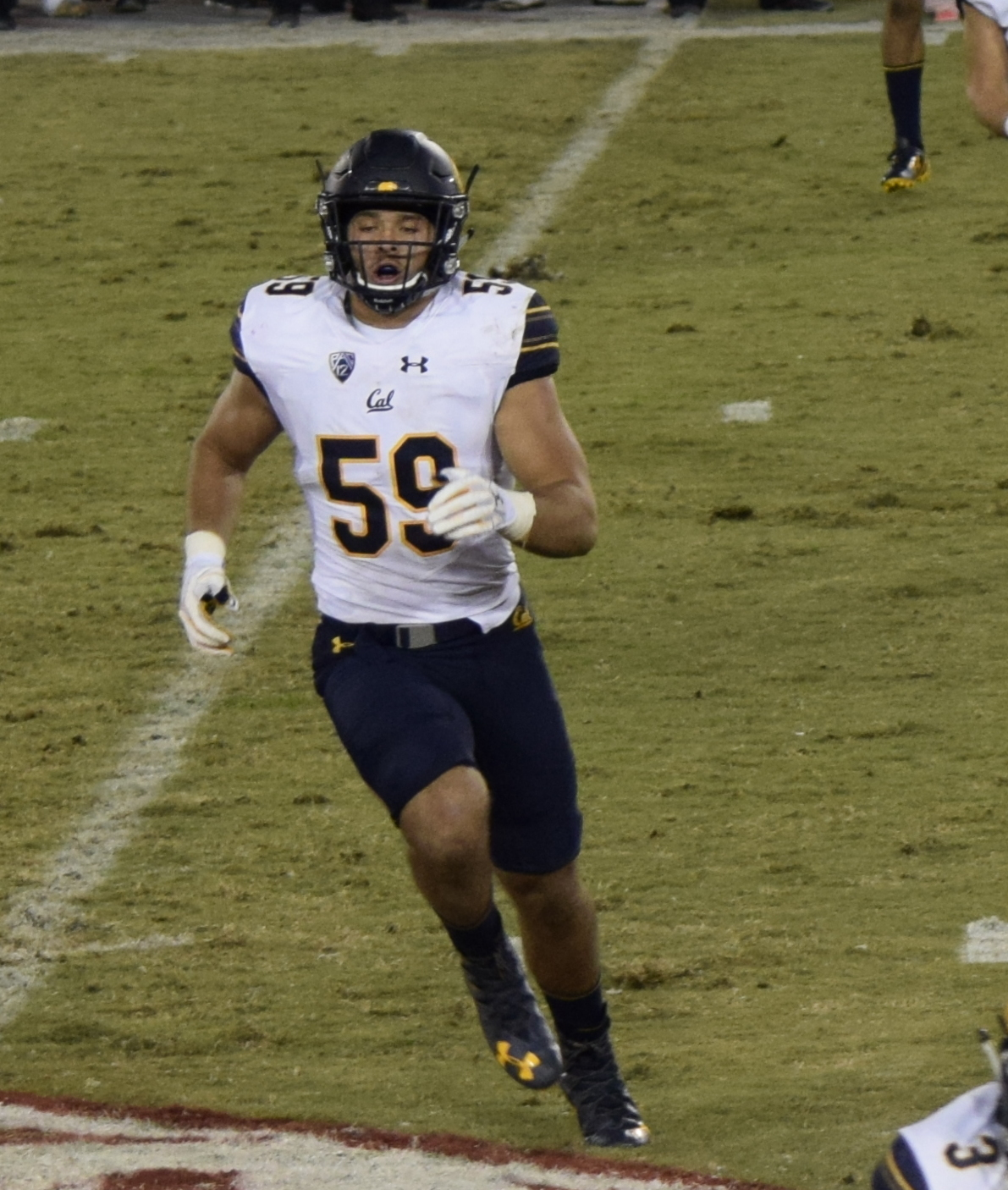
- Kunaszyk playing for Cal in 2017

Profile
- Position: Linebacker

Personal information
- Born: October 15, 1996 (age 30); Sacramento, California, U.S.
- Listed height: 6 ft 3 in (1.91 m)
- Listed weight: 235 lb (107 kg)

Career information
- High school: Roseville (Roseville, California)
- College: American River (2014–2015); California (2016–2018)
- NFL draft: 2019: undrafted

Career history
- Carolina Panthers (2019); Washington Football Team (2020–2021); Cleveland Browns (2022–2023); Minnesota Vikings (2024)

Awards and highlights
- First-team All-Pac-12 (2018)

Career NFL statistics
- Total tackles: 45
- Forced fumbles: 1
- Pass deflections: 1
- Stats at Pro Football Reference

Jordan Kunaszyk (born October 15, 1996) is an American professional football linebacker. He played college football for the American River Beavers and California Golden Bears and signed with the Carolina Panthers as an undrafted free agent in 2019.

== Early life ==
Kunaszyk was born in Sacramento, California and grew up in nearby Roseville, where he attended Roseville High School and played football. In his first year of varsity football, Kunaszyk notched 77 tackles (nine for loss), three sacks, two forced fumbles and two fumble recoveries and was named second-team All-Sierra Foothill League and was named first-team all league as a senior after recording 101 tackles (21 for loss), 2.0 sacks, one interception and a forced fumble.

== College career ==
Kunaszyk began his collegiate career at American River College. He was forced to redshirt his true freshman season after breaking his wrist while playing his first snap of the year. The following season he recorded 118 tackles (the most of any California junior college player), three sacks, one forced fumble and three pass breakups and was named first-team All-Big 8 Conference, a Junior College Freshman All-American and the CCCAA NorCal Division Defensive Player of the Year. Following the season he committed to transfer to California for the final three seasons of his NCAA eligibility over offers from Colorado, Iowa State, UNLV and Fresno State.

In his first season with the Bears, Kunaszyk made 51 tackles as a reserve linebacker. As a redshirt junior, he tallied 74 tackles, 3.5 sacks and two interceptions with a forced fumble and a fumble recovery despite missing three games to injury. In his final season, Kunaszyk made 148 tackles (11 for loss), four sacks and five forced fumbles with three pass breakups and an interception and was named first-team All-Pac-12 Conference and second-team All-America by Sports Illustrated.

== Professional career ==
Pre-draft measurables
Height	Weight	Arm length	Hand span	40-yard dash	10-yard split	20-yard split	20-yard shuttle	Three-cone drill	Vertical jump	Broad jump	Bench press
6 ft 3 in (1.91 m)	234 lb (106 kg)	30 5/8 in (0.78 m)	9 1/2 in (0.24 m)	4.81 s	1.64 s	2.76 s	4.32 s	7.41 s	33.0 in (0.84 m)	9 ft 7 in (2.92 m)	16 reps
All values from Pro Day

=== Carolina Panthers ===
Kunaszyk signed with the Carolina Panthers as an undrafted free agent on April 27, 2019. He made his NFL debut on September 12, against the Tampa Bay Buccaneers, playing 15 snaps on special teams. Kunaszyk played in nine games, recording seven tackles. Kunaszyk was waived by the Panthers on September 5, 2020.

=== Washington Football Team ===
Kunaszyk signed with the practice squad of the Washington Football Team on September 26, 2020. He was elevated to the active roster on November 14 and 21 for the team's weeks 10 and 11 games against the Detroit Lions and Cincinnati Bengals, and reverted to the practice squad after each game. Kunaszyk was signed to the active roster on November 25.

Kunaszyk was released by the Football Team on August 31, 2021, and re-signed to the practice squad the following day. Kunaszyk signed with the active roster on October 5. On January 8, 2022, Kunaszyk was placed on the COVID-19 reserve list and was officially ruled out of the team's season finale. On May 16, Kunaszyk was released by Washington.

=== Cleveland Browns ===
On August 9, 2022, Kunaszyk signed with the Cleveland Browns. He was released on September 5, and re-signed to the Browns' practice squad the following day. Kunaszyk was promoted to the active roster on September 21. He played in 15 games with two starts, recording a career-high 22 tackles.

On February 14, 2023, Kunaszyk was released by the Browns. He was re-signed on March 20. Kunaszyk was placed on injured reserve on August 31. He was activated on November 25.

=== Minnesota Vikings ===
On August 13, 2024, Kunaszyk signed with the Minnesota Vikings. He was placed on injured reserve on August 27. Kunaszyk was released by the Vikings on December 17.
