= Cameron Goode =

American football player (born 1998)

Profile
- Position: Linebacker

Personal information
- Born: April 15, 1998 (age 28); Spring, Texas, U.S.
- Listed height: 6 ft 3 in (1.91 m)
- Listed weight: 253 lb (115 kg)

Career information
- High school: Klein Collins (Spring)
- College: California (2016–2021)
- NFL draft: 2022: 7th round, 224th overall pick

Career history
- Miami Dolphins (2022–2025)

Career NFL statistics as of 2025
- Tackles: 29
- Stats at Pro Football Reference

Cameron James Goode (born April 15, 1998) is an American professional football linebacker. He played college football for the California Golden Bears.

== Early life ==
Goode is the son of James and Crystal Goode. His father played college football at Oklahoma and was selected in the fifth round of the 1991 NFL Draft by the Atlanta Falcons but never played in an NFL contest. Goode attended high school at Klein Collins High School in Klein, Texas where he played football. He wore the number 23 in high school. Goode played baseball for 10 years prior to focusing solely on football in high school.

== College career ==
At the University of California, Berkeley, Goode was a member of the California Golden Bears for six seasons and redshirted his true freshman season. Goode finished his college career with 171 tackles, 36.5 tackles for loss, and 21.5 sacks. Goode graduated from Cal in December 2020 with a bachelor's degree in legal studies before earning graduate certificates in entrepreneurship in May of 2021 and business administration in December of 2021.

== Professional career ==
Pre-draft measurables
Height	Weight	Arm length	Hand span	Wingspan	40-yard dash	10-yard split	20-yard split	20-yard shuttle	Three-cone drill	Vertical jump	Broad jump	Bench press
6 ft 3 in (1.91 m)	237 lb (108 kg)	33 7/8 in (0.86 m)	8 5/8 in (0.22 m)	6 ft 9 3/4 in (2.08 m)	4.63 s	1.51 s	2.67 s	4.29 s	6.91 s	39.0 in (0.99 m)	10 ft 5 in (3.18 m)	17 reps
All values from Pro Day

Goode was selected by the Miami Dolphins in the seventh round, 224th overall, of the 2022 NFL draft. He was waived by the Dolphins on August 30, 2022, and re-signed to the practice squad. Goode signed a reserve/future contract with Miami on January 16, 2023.

On August 29, 2023, Goode was waived by the Dolphins and re-signed to the practice squad. He was promoted to the active roster on September 30. On January 9, 2024, the Dolphins placed Goode on injured reserve.

On July 18, 2024, Goode was placed on the active/physically unable to perform (PUP) list, and placed on reserves to begin the season. He was activated on December 21.

On March 4, 2026, Goode re-signed with the Dolphins. On August 30, he was released by Miami as a part of final roster cuts.

== Personal life ==
Goode is the nephew of Don Goode.
