= 2018 Oregon State Beavers football team =

American college football season

2018 Oregon State Beavers football
- Conference: Pac-12 Conference
- North Division
- Record: 2–10 (1–8 Pac-12)
- Head coach: Jonathan Smith (1st season)
- Offensive coordinator: Brian Lindgren (1st season)
- Offensive scheme: Spread
- Defensive coordinator: Tim Tibesar (1st season)
- Base defense: Multiple 4–2–5
- Home stadium: Reser Stadium

2018 Pac-12 Conference football standings
	Conf.			Overall
Team	W		L	W		L
North Division
No. 13 Washington xy$	7	–	2	10	–	4
No. 10 Washington State x	7	–	2	11	–	2
Stanford	6	–	3	9	–	4
Oregon	5	–	4	9	–	4
California	4	–	5	7	–	6
Oregon State	1	–	8	2	–	10
South Division
Utah xy	6	–	3	9	–	5
Arizona State	5	–	4	7	–	6
USC	4	–	5	5	–	7
Arizona	4	–	5	5	–	7
UCLA	3	–	6	3	–	9
Colorado	2	–	7	5	–	7
Championship: Washington 10, Utah 3
$ – Conference champion; x – Division champion/co-champions; y – Championship game participant; Rankings from AP Poll

The 2018 Oregon State Beavers football team represented Oregon State University during the 2018 NCAA Division I FBS football season. The team played their home games on campus at Reser Stadium in Corvallis, Oregon as a member of the North Division of the Pac-12 Conference. They were led by first-year head coach Jonathan Smith. The schedule was released on November 16, 2017. The Beavers finished the season with a 2–10 record. They went 1–8 in Pac-12 play and finished in last place in the North Division.

== Preseason ==
=== Award watch lists ===
Listed in the order that they were released

Award	Player	Position	Year
Rimington Trophy	Summer Houston	C	SR
Wuerffel Trophy	Trevon Bradford	WR	JR
Johnny Unitas Golden Arm Award	Jake Luton	QB	SR
Earl Campbell Tyler Rose Award	Calvin Tyler, Jr.	RB	SO

=== Pac-12 media days ===
The 2018 Pac-12 media days were on July 25, 2018, in Hollywood, California. Oregon State was represented by Jonathan Smith (HC), Blake Brandel (OL) & Kee Whetzel (LB) at Pac-12 Media Days. The Pac-12 media poll was released with the Beavers predicted to finish in last place in the North Division.

== Schedule ==
Date	Time	Opponent	Site	TV	Result	Attendance
September 1	9:00 a.m.	at No. 5 Ohio State*	Ohio Stadium; Columbus, OH	ABC	L 31–77	102,169
September 8	5:00 p.m.	Southern Utah*	Reser Stadium; Corvallis, OR	P12N	W 48–25	36,448
September 15	4:00 p.m.	at Nevada*	Mackay Stadium; Reno, NV	ESPNU	L 35–37	20,462
September 22	1:00 p.m.	Arizona	Reser Stadium; Corvallis, OR	P12N	L 14–35	33,022
September 29	7:00 p.m.	at Arizona State	Sun Devil Stadium; Tempe, AZ	P12N	L 24–52	51,447
October 6	6:00 p.m.	Washington State	Reser Stadium; Corvallis, OR	P12N	L 37–56	34,429
October 20	1:00 p.m.	California^{†}	Reser Stadium; Corvallis, OR	P12N	L 7–49	32,390
October 27	12:00 p.m.	at Colorado	Folsom Field; Boulder, CO	P12N	W 41–34 ^{OT}	48,050
November 3	7:00 p.m.	USC	Reser Stadium; Corvallis, OR	FS1	L 21–38	35,187
November 10	6:00 p.m.	at Stanford	Stanford Stadium; Stanford, CA	P12N	L 17–48	34,671
November 17	1:30 p.m.	at No. 17 Washington	Husky Stadium; Seattle, WA	P12N	L 23–42	66,469
November 23	1:00 p.m.	Oregon	Reser Stadium; Corvallis, OR (122nd Civil War)	FS1	L 15–55	39,776
*Non-conference game; ^{†}Homecoming; Rankings from AP Poll released prior to the game; All times are in Pacific time

== Game summaries ==
=== At Ohio State ===
	1	2	3	4	Total
Beavers	7	7	17	0	31
No. 5 Buckeyes	21	21	14	21	77

=== Southern Utah ===
	1	2	3	4	Total
Thunderbirds	0	7	9	9	25
Beavers	17	24	0	7	48

=== At Nevada ===
	1	2	3	4	Total
Beavers	7	14	0	14	35
Wolf Pack	16	14	0	7	37

=== Arizona ===
	1	2	3	4	Total
Wildcats	7	7	7	14	35
Beavers	7	0	0	7	14

=== At Arizona State ===
	1	2	3	4	Total
Beavers	0	17	7	0	24
Sun Devils	10	21	7	14	52

=== Washington State ===
	1	2	3	4	Total
Cougars	14	14	7	21	56
Beavers	14	10	6	7	37

=== California ===
	1	2	3	4	Total
Golden Bears	7	14	7	21	49
Beavers	0	0	7	0	7

=== At Colorado ===
	1	2	3	4	OT	Total
Beavers	0	3	7	24	7	41
Buffaloes	7	17	7	3	0	34

=== USC ===
	1	2	3	4	Total
Trojans	7	14	7	10	38
Beavers	0	14	7	0	21

=== At Stanford ===
	1	2	3	4	Total
Beavers	7	10	0	0	17
Cardinal	13	21	7	7	48

=== At Washington ===
	1	2	3	4	Total
Beavers	3	13	0	7	23
No. 17 Huskies	28	7	7	0	42

=== Oregon ===
	1	2	3	4	Total
Ducks	14	7	13	21	55
Beavers	0	3	6	6	15

== Awards ==
Pac-12 Freshman Offensive Player of the Year: Jermar Jefferson
