= 2018 Washington State Cougars football team =

American college football season

2018 Washington State Cougars football

Pac-12 North Division co-champion Alamo Bowl champion

Alamo Bowl, W 28–26 vs. Iowa State
- Conference: Pac–12 Conference
- North Division

Ranking
- Coaches: No. 10
- AP: No. 10
- Record: 11–2 (7–2 Pac-12)
- Head coach: Mike Leach (7th season)
- Offensive scheme: Air raid
- Defensive coordinator: Tracy Claeys (1st season)
- Base defense: 4–2–5
- Home stadium: Martin Stadium

Uniform
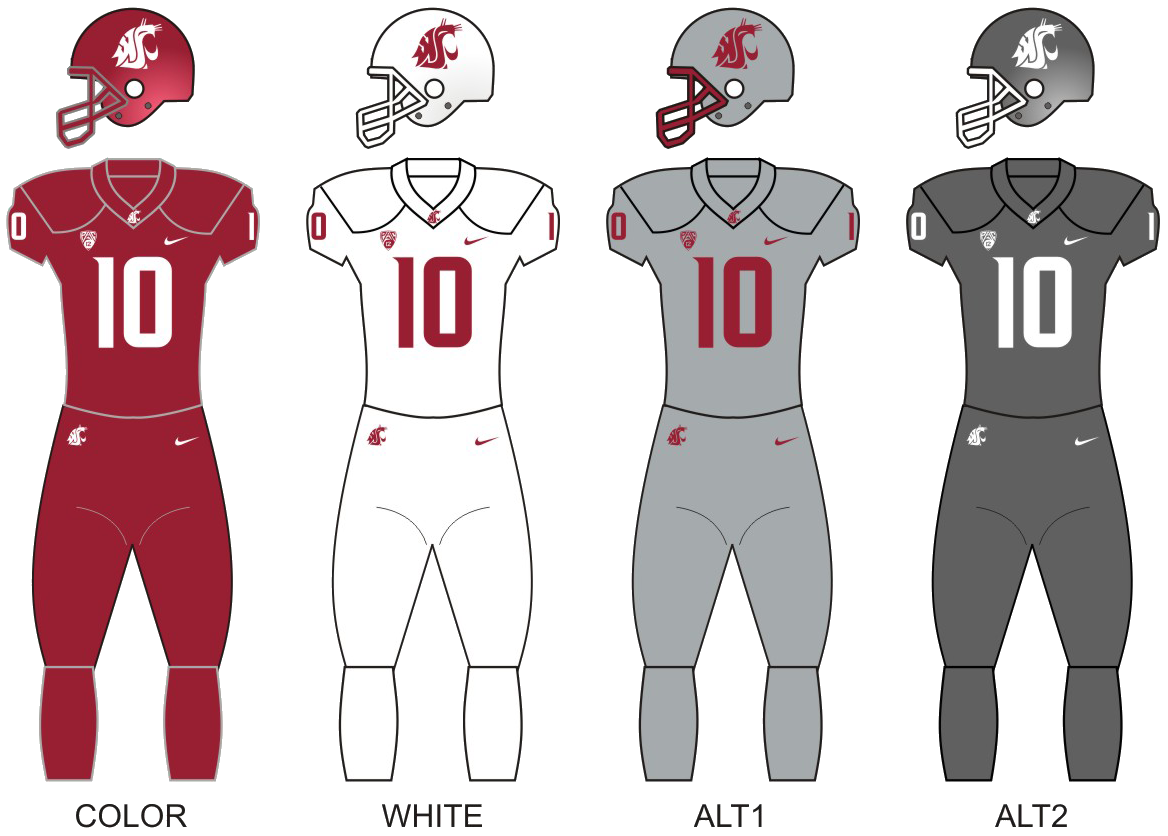

2018 Pac-12 Conference football standings
	Conf.			Overall
Team	W		L	W		L
North Division
No. 13 Washington xy$	7	–	2	10	–	4
No. 10 Washington State x	7	–	2	11	–	2
Stanford	6	–	3	9	–	4
Oregon	5	–	4	9	–	4
California	4	–	5	7	–	6
Oregon State	1	–	8	2	–	10
South Division
Utah xy	6	–	3	9	–	5
Arizona State	5	–	4	7	–	6
USC	4	–	5	5	–	7
Arizona	4	–	5	5	–	7
UCLA	3	–	6	3	–	9
Colorado	2	–	7	5	–	7
Championship: Washington 10, Utah 3
$ – Conference champion; x – Division champion/co-champions; y – Championship game participant; Rankings from AP Poll

The 2018 Washington State Cougars football team represented Washington State University during the 2018 NCAA Division I FBS football season. The team played their home games in Martin Stadium in Pullman, Washington. They were led by 7th-year head coach Mike Leach and were members of the North Division of the Pac-12 Conference.

The 2018 season was one of the greatest in Washington State history. The Cougars won a school record-tying ten games, the first time they had won that many in the regular season since the Rose Bowl year of 2002. They also surged as high as seventh in major polling and went into the Apple Cup with a chance to clinch the Pac-12 North title and a shot at the Rose Bowl, but lost 28–15 to rival Washington in the snow in Pullman, a sixth consecutive loss to the Huskies. The 10–2 Cougars were invited to the Alamo Bowl in San Antonio to play the Iowa State Cyclones. They won 28–26 for a school record 11th win.

Mike Leach's air raid offense was led by grad transfer quarterback Gardner Minshew, who led FBS in passing completions and attempts, and finished second in passing yards. Minshew was named Pac-12 Offensive Player of the Year and was the recipient of the Johnny Unitas Golden Arm Award. He and offensive tackle Andre Dillard were named first-team all-conference. Redshirt freshman offensive tackle Abraham Lucas was named to several national all-freshman teams, and was joined on the all-conference second-team by defensive end Logan Tago. Mike Leach was named Pac-12 Coach of the Year for the second time of his career.

== Preseason ==
=== Award watch lists ===
Listed in the order that they were released

Award	Player	Position	Year
Rimington Trophy	Frederick Mauigoa	C	JR
Chuck Bednarik Award	Jalen Thompson	S	JR
Wuerffel Trophy	Peyton Pelluer	LB	SR
Johnny Unitas Golden Arm Award	Gardner Minshew	QB	SR
Davey O'Brien National Quarterback Award	Gardner Minshew	QB	SR

=== Pac-12 media days ===
The 2018 Pac-12 media days were held July 25, 2018 in Hollywood, California. Mike Leach (HC), Kyle Sweet (WR/P) & Jalen Thompson (S) represented Washington State at this event. The Pac-12 media poll was released with the Cougars predicted to finish in fifth place at Pac-12 North division.

== Schedule ==
Date	Time	Opponent	Rank	Site	TV	Result	Attendance
September 1	12:30 p.m.	at Wyoming*		War Memorial Stadium; Laramie, WY	CBSSN	W 41–19	24,131
September 8	8:00 p.m.	San Jose State*		Martin Stadium; Pullman, WA	P12N	W 31–0	26,141
September 15	5:00 p.m.	No. 6 (FCS) Eastern Washington*		Martin Stadium; Pullman, WA	P12N	W 59–24	32,952
September 21	7:30 p.m.	at USC		Los Angeles Memorial Coliseum; Los Angeles, CA	ESPN	L 36–39	52,421
September 29	3:00 p.m.	Utah^{†}		Martin Stadium; Pullman, WA	P12N	W 28–24	30,088
October 6	6:00 p.m.	at Oregon State		Reser Stadium; Corvallis, OR	P12N	W 56–37	34,429
October 20	4:30 p.m.	No. 12 Oregon	No. 25	Martin Stadium; Pullman, WA (College GameDay)	FOX	W 34–20	33,152
October 27	4:10 p.m.	at No. 24 Stanford	No. 14	Stanford Stadium; Stanford, CA	P12N	W 41–38	39,596
November 3	7:45 p.m.	California	No. 8	Martin Stadium; Pullman, WA	ESPN	W 19–13	32,952
November 10	12:30 p.m.	at Colorado	No. 8	Folsom Field; Boulder, CO	ESPN	W 31–7	45,587
November 17	7:30 p.m.	Arizona	No. 8	Martin Stadium; Pullman, WA	ESPN	W 69–28	22,400
November 23	5:30 p.m.	No. 16 Washington	No. 8	Martin Stadium; Pullman, WA (111th Apple Cup)	FOX	L 15–28	32,952
December 28	6:00 p.m.	vs. No. 24 Iowa State*	No. 13	Alamodome; San Antonio, TX (Alamo Bowl)	ESPN	W 28–26	60,675
*Non-conference game; ^{†}Homecoming; Rankings from AP Poll and CFP Rankings after October 30 released prior to game; All times are in Pacific time

Conference opponents not played this season: Arizona State, UCLA

== Rankings ==
Ranking movements Legend: ██ Increase in ranking ██ Decrease in ranking — = Not ranked RV = Received votes
	Week															
Poll	Pre	1	2	3	4	5	6	7	8	9	10	11	12	13	14	Final
AP	—	RV	RV	RV	—	RV	RV	25	14	10	10	8	7	12	12	10
Coaches	RV	RV	RV	RV	RV	RV	RV	23	15	11	9	9	7	13	13	10
CFP	Not released									8	8	8	8	13	13	Not released

== Game summaries ==
=== At Wyoming ===
Washington State at Wyoming – Game summary

Quarter	1	2	3	4	Total
Cougars	10	3	7	21	41
Cowboys	2	14	3	0	19

at War Memorial Stadium, Laramie, WY

- Date: September 1
- Game time: 12:30 p.m. PDT
- Game weather: 75 °F (24 °C); Partly cloudy
- Game attendance: 24,131
- Referee: Kevin Hassell
- TV announcers (CBSSN): Rich Waltz, Aaron Murray, A.J. Ross
- wsucougars.com Game Notes wsucougars.com Box Score

Game information

First quarter

- WSU – Blake Mazza 24 yard field goal, 9:57 (WSU 3–0)
- WSU – James Williams 2 yard TD pass from Gardner Minshew (Blake Mazza kick good), 3:28 (WSU 10–0)
- WY – Jevon Bigelow safety, 1:35 (WSU 10–2)

Second quarter

- WY – Nico Evans 8 yard TD run (Cooper Rothe kick good), 12:23 (WSU 10–9)
- WSU – Blake Mazza 41 yard field goal, 8:37 (WSU 13–9)
- WY – Avante' Cox 23 yard TD run (Cooper Rothe kick good), 5:07 (WY 16–13)

Third quarter

- WY – Cooper Rothe 30 yard field goal, 8:48 (WY 19–13)
- WSU – Max Borghi 6 yard TD pass from Gardner Minshew (Blake Mazza kick good), 3:51 (WSU 20–19)

Fourth quarter

- WSU – Easop Winston 7 yard TD pass from Gardner Minshew (Blake Mazza kick good), 10:55 (WSU 27–19)
- WSU – Max Borghi 14 yard TD run (Blake Mazza kick good), 5:50 (WSU 34–19)
- WSU – James Williams 3 yard TD run (Blake Mazza kick good), 0:44 (WSU 41–19)

Top passers

- WSU – Gardner Minshew – 38/57, 319 yards, 3 TD, int
- WY – Tyler Vander Waal – 8/20, 229 yards, int

Top rushers

- WSU – James Williams – 16 carries, 82 yards, TD
- WY – Nico Evans – 18 carries, 89 yards, TD

Top receivers

- WSU – Jamire Calvin – 5 receptions, 82 yards
- WY – Austin Conway – 3 receptions, 18 yards

Top defenders

- WSU – Skyler Thomas – 9 tackles
- WY – Logan Wilson – 12 tackles, 1 TFL

=== San Jose State ===
San Jose State at Washington State – Game summary

Quarter	1	2	3	4	Total
Spartans	0	0	0	0	0
Cougars	14	10	0	7	31

at Martin Stadium, Pullman, WA

- Date: September 8
- Game time: 8:00 p.m. PDT
- Game attendance: 26,141
- TV announcers (P12N): Guy Haberman, Ryan Leaf, Cindy Brunson
- wsucougars.com Game Notes wsucougars.com Box Score

Game information

First quarter

- WSU – Tay Martin 15 yard pass from Gardner Minshew (Blake Mazza kick), 12:55 (WSU 7–0)
- WSU – Tay Martin 36 yard pass from Gardner Minshew (Blake Mazza kick), 5:45 (WSU 14–0)

Second quarter

- WSU – Blake Mazza 36 yd FG, 5:48 (WSU 17–0)
- WSU – Gardner Minshew 1 yd run (Blake Mazza kick), 0:00 (WSU 24–0)

Third quarter
Fourth quarter

- WSU – James Williams 3 yd pass from Gardner Minshew (Blake Mazza kick), 4:39 (WSU 31–0)

Top passers

- SJSU – Montel Aaron – 13/25, 52 yards
- WSU – Gardner Minshew – 34/51, 414 yards, 3 TD, 2 int

Top rushers

- SJSU – Malike Roberson – 12 carries, 33 yards
- WSU – Gardner Minshew – 9 carries, 32 yards, TD

Top receivers

- SJSU – Josh Oliver – 5 receptions, 51 yards
- WSU – Travell Harris – 6 receptions, 83 yards

Top defenders

- SJSU – A. J. Keene – 7 tackles
- WSU – Skyler Thomas – 9 tackles

=== Eastern Washington ===
Eastern Washington at Washington State – Game summary

Quarter	1	2	3	4	Total
No. 6 (FCS) Eagles	0	10	14	0	24
Cougars	14	14	7	24	59

at Martin Stadium, Pullman, WA

- Date: September 15
- Game time: 5:00 p.m. PDT
- Game attendance: 32,952
- Referee: Steve Strimling
- TV announcers (P12N): Guy Haberman, Ryan Leaf, Cindy Brunson
- wsucougars.com Game Notes Box Score

Game information

First quarter

- WSU – James Williams 1 yard TD run (Blake Mazza kick), 9:27 (WSU 7–0)
- WSU – Easop Winston 14 yard TD pass from Gardner Minshew (Blake Mazza kick), 1:45 (WSU 14–0)

Second quarter

- EWU – Roldan Alcobendas 37 yard field goal, 12:11 (WSU 14–3)
- WSU – Travell Harris 100 yard kickoff return (Blake Mazza kick), 11:56 (WSU 21–3)
- WSU – James Williams 2 yard TD run (Blake Mazza kick), 2:14 (WSU 28–3)
- EWU – Andrew Boston 26 yard TD pass from Gage Gubrud (Roldan Alcobendas kick), 0:39 (WSU 28–10)

Third quarter

- EWU – Zach Eagle 34 yard TD pass from Gage Gubrud (Roldan Alcobendas kick), 11:41 (WSU 28–17)
- WSU – James Williams 8 yard TD run (Blake Mazza kick), 4:37 (WSU 35–17)
- EWU – Dennis Merritt 44 yard TD pass from Gage Gubrud (Roldan Alcobendas kick), 3:54 (WSU 35–24)

Fourth quarter

- WSU – Blake Mazza 44 yard field goal, 14:05 (WSU 38–24)
- WSU – Tay Martin 21 yard TD pass from Gardner Minshew (Blake Mazza kick), 9:47 (WSU 45–24)
- WSU – Max Borghi 6 yard TD run (Blake Mazza kick), 8:24 (WSU 52–24)
- WSU – Robert Lewis 6 yard TD pass from Trey Tinsley (Blake Mazza kick), 1:21 (WSU 59–24)

Top passers

- EWU – Gage Gubrud – 14/36, 231 yards, 3 TD, 3 int
- WSU – Gardner Minshew – 45/57, 470 yards, 2 TD

Top rushers

- EWU – Sam McPherson – 17 carries, 72 yards
- WSU – James Williams – 6 carries, 19 yards, 3 TD

Top receivers

- EWU – Zach Eagle – 4 receptions, 73 yards, TD
- WSU – Tay Martin – 13 receptions, 149 yards, TD

Top defenders

- EWU – Ketner Kupp – 7 tackles, sack, 2 TFL
- WSU – Hunter Dale – 10 tackles

=== At USC ===
Washington State at USC – Game summary

Quarter	1	2	3	4	Total
Cougars	3	21	6	6	36
Trojans	7	10	7	15	39

at Los Angeles Memorial Coliseum, Los Angeles, CA

- Date: September 21
- Game time: 7:35 p.m. PDT
- Game weather: 70 °F (21 °C); clear skies
- Game attendance: 52,421
- Referee: Javarro Edwards
- TV announcers (ESPN): Dave Pasch, Greg McElroy, Tom Luginbill
- wsucougars.com Game Notes wsucougars.com Box Score

Game information

First quarter

- USC – Vavae Malepeai 3 yard run (Michael Brown kick), 12:56 (USC 7–0)
- WSU – Blake Mazza 50 yard field goal, 7:19 (USC 7–3)

Second quarter

- WSU – James Williams 4 yard run (Blake Mazza kick), 13:29 (WSU 10–7)
- USC – Tyler Vaughns 9 yard pass from JT Daniels (Michael Brown kick), 12:23 (USC 14–10)
- WSU – Easop Winston 28 yard pass from Gardner Minshew (Blake Mazza kick), 9:55 (WSU 17–14)
- WSU – Dezmon Patmon 7 yard pass from Gardner Minshew (Blake Mazza kick), 1:39 (WSU 24–14)
- USC – Michael Brown 26 yard field goal, 0:00 (WSU 24–17)

Third quarter

- WSU – Max Borghi 13 yard run (run failed), 10:21 (WSU 30–17)
- USC – Michael Pittman 50 yard pass from JT Daniels (Michael Brown kick), 9:03 (WSU 30–24)

Fourth quarter

- USC – Amon-Ra St. Brown 30 yard pass from JT Daniels (Michael Brown kick), 14:31 (USC 31–30)
- WSU – Easop Winston 4 yard pass from Gardner Minshew (pass failed), 10:15 (WSU 36–31)
- USC – Vavae Malepeai 2 yard run (Tyler Vaughns pass from JT Daniels), 8:03 (USC 39–36)

Top passers

- WSU – Gardner Minshew – 37/52, 344 yards, 3 TD
- USC – JT Daniels – 17/26, 241 yards, 3 TD

Top rushers

- WSU – James Williams – 17 carries, 54 yards, TD
- USC – Vavae Malepeai – 13 carries, 78 yards, 2 TD

Top receivers

- WSU – Easop Winston – 6 receptions, 143 yards, 2 TD
- USC – Tyler Vaughns – 7 receptions, 64 yards, TD

Top defenders

- WSU – Peyton Pelluer – 12 tackles, sack, 2 TFL
- USC – Cameron Smith – 15 tackles, 2 TFL

=== Utah ===
Utah at Washington State – Game summary

Quarter	1	2	3	4	Total
Utes	14	7	3	0	24
Cougars	7	14	0	7	28

at Martin Stadium, Pullman, WA

- Date: September 29
- Game time: 3:07 p.m. PDT
- Game weather: 71 °F (22 °C); partly cloudy
- Game attendance: 30,088
- Referee: M. Mothershed
- TV announcers (P12N): Ted Robinson, Yogi Roth, Jill Savage
- wsucougars.com Game Notes wsucougars.com Box Score

Game information

First quarter

- UTAH – Tyler Huntley 24 yard run (Matt Gay kick), 8:22 (UTAH 7–0)
- WSU – Tay Martin 4 yard pass from Gardner Minshew (Blake Mazza kick), 5:07 (TIE 7–7)
- UTAH – Zack Moss 6 yard run (Matt Gay kick), 1:07 (UTAH 14–7)

Second quarter

- WSU – Gardner Minshew 10 yard run (Blake Mazza kick), 11:47 (TIE 14–14)
- WSU – Dezmon Patmon 65 yard pass from Gardner Minshew (Blake Mazza kick), 9:03 (WSU 21–14)
- UTAH – Tyler Huntley 1 yard run (Matt Gay kick), 6:01 (TIE 21–21)

Third quarter

- UTAH – Matt Gay 41 yard field goal, 10:39 (UTAH 24–21)

Fourth quarter

- WSU – Easop Winston 89 yard pass from Gardner Minshew (Blake Mazza kick), 4:14 (WSU 28–24)

Top passers

- UTAH – Tyler Huntley – 12/20, 118 yards
- WSU – Gardner Minshew – 31/56, 445 yards, 3 TD, int

Top rushers

- UTAH – Zack Moss – 30 carries, 106 yards, TD
- WSU – James Williams – 5 carries, 13 yards

Top receivers

- UTAH – Britain Covey – 4 receptions, 22 yards
- WSU – Easop Winston – 4 receptions, 115 yards, TD

Top defenders

- UTAH – Chase Hansen – 7 tackles, 2 TFL
- WSU – Peyton Pelluer – 13 tackles, sack, 1.5 TFL

=== At Oregon State ===
Washington State at Oregon State – Game summary

Quarter	1	2	3	4	Total
Cougars	14	14	7	21	56
Beavers	14	10	6	7	37

at Reser Stadium, Corvallis, OR

- Date: October 6
- Game time: 6:10 p.m. PDT
- Game weather: 62 °F (17 °C); mostly clear
- Game attendance: 34,429
- Referee: Kevin Mar
- TV announcers (P12N): Ted Robinson, Yogi Roth, Jill Savage
- wsucougars.com Game Notes wsucougars.com Box Score

Game information

First quarter

- WSU – Renard Bell 6 yard pass from Gardner Minshew (Blake Mazza kick), 13:44 (WSU 7–0)
- WSU – Tristan Brock 5 yard blocked punt return (Blake Mazza kick), 12:32 (WSU 14–0)
- OSU – Jermar Jefferson 6 yard run (Jordan Choukair kick), 6:16 (WSU 14–7)
- OSU – Jermar Jefferson 6 yard run (Jordan Choukair kick), 1:21 (TIED 14–14)

Second quarter

- WSU – Tay Martin 38 yard pass from Gardner Minshew (Blake Mazza kick), 13:42 (WSU 21–14)
- OSU – Jordan Choukair 32 yard field goal, 8:35 (WSU 21–17)
- OSU – Jermar Jefferson 3 yard run (Jordan Choukair kick), 4:47 (OSU 24–21)
- WSU – James Williams 15 yard pass from Gardner Minshew (Blake Mazza kick), 0:34 (WSU 28–24)

Third quarter

- OSU – Jermar Jefferson 1 yard run (Jordan Choukair kick failed), 12:10 (OSU 30–28)
- WSU – Max Borghi 1 yard run (Blake Mazza kick), 6:37 (WSU 35–30)

Fourth quarter

- WSU – Travell Harris 3 yard pass from Gardner Minshew (Blake Mazza kick), 14:22 (WSU 42–30)
- WSU – Tay Martin 27 yard pass from Gardner Minshew (Blake Mazza kick), 9:06 (WSU 49–30)
- WSU – Max Borghi 30 yard run (Blake Mazza kick), 1:11 (WSU 56–30)
- OSU – B.J. Baylor 4 yard run (Jordan Choukair kick), 0:35 (WSU 56–37)

Top passers

- WSU – Gardner Minshew – 30/40, 430 yards, 5 TD
- OSU – Conor Blount – 15/21, 172 yards

Top rushers

- WSU – James Williams – 10 carries, 56 yards
- OSU – Jermar Jefferson – 25 carries, 138 yards, 4 TD

Top receivers

- WSU – Tay Martin – 8 receptions, 119 yards, 2 TD
- OSU – Trevon Bradford – 8 receptions, 68 yards

Top defenders

- WSU – Peyton Pelluer – 11 tackles, TFL
- OSU – Jalen Moore – 8 tackles

=== Oregon ===
Oregon at Washington State – Game summary

Quarter	1	2	3	4	Total
No. 12 Ducks	0	0	17	3	20
No. 25 Cougars	7	20	0	7	34

at Martin Stadium, Pullman, WA

- Date: October 20
- Game time: 4:35 p.m. PDT
- Game weather: 71 °F (22 °C); clear
- Game attendance: 33,152
- Referee: Mark Duddy
- TV announcers (FOX): Tim Brando, Spencer Tillman and Holly Sonders
- wsucougars.com Box Score

Game information

First quarter

- WSU – James Williams 24 yard run (Blake Mazza kick), 4:30 (WSU 7–0)

Second quarter

- WSU – Renard Bell 16 yard pass from Gardner Minshew (rush failed), 12:22 (WSU 13–0)
- WSU – Easop Winston 6 yard pass from Gardner Minshew (Blake Mazza kick), 2:59 (WSU 20–0)
- WSU – Max Borghi 15 yard pass from Gardner Minshew (Blake Mazza kick), 0:41 (WSU 27–0)

Third quarter

- ORE – Justin Herbert 8 yard run (Adam Stack kick), 11:54 (WSU 27–7)
- ORE – Adam Stack 32 yard field goal, 6:58 (WSU 27–10)
- ORE – Jaylon Redd 11 yard pass from Justin Herbert (Adam Stack kick), 0:36 (WSU 27–17)

Fourth quarter

- ORE – Adam Stack 23 yard field goal, 6:38 (WSU 27–20)
- WSU – Dezmon Patmon 22 yard pass from Gardner Minshew (Blake Mazza kick), 3:40 (WSU 34–20)

Top passers

- ORE – Justin Herbert – 25/44, 270 yards, TD
- WSU – Gardner Minshew – 39/51, 323 yards, 4 TD, 2 int

Top rushers

- ORE – C. J. Verdell – 12 carries, 55 yards
- WSU – James Williams – 9 carries, 53 yards, TD

Top receivers

- ORE – Jake Breeland – 4 receptions, 63 yards
- WSU – Dezmon Patmon – 6 receptions, 81 yards, TD

Top defenders

- ORE – Kaulana Apelu – 14 tackles
- WSU – Jalen Thompson – 7 tackles

=== At Stanford ===
Washington State at Stanford – Game summary

Quarter	1	2	3	4	Total
No. 14 Cougars	14	3	7	17	41
No. 24 Cardinal	14	14	3	7	38

at Stanford Stadium, Stanford, CA

- Date: October 27
- Game time: 4:35 p.m. PDT
- Game weather: 68 °F (20 °C)
- Game attendance: 39,596
- Referee: Mike McCabe
- TV announcers (P12N): Ted Robinson, Yogi Roth, Jill Savage
- gostanford.com Box Score

Game information

First quarter

- STAN – J. J. Arcega-Whiteside 18 yard pass from K. J. Costello (Jet Toner kick), 11:09 (STAN 7–0)
- WSU – James Williams 5 yard run (Blake Mazza kick), 8:17 (TIED 7–7)
- WSU – Max Borghi 4 yard pass from Gardner Minshew (Blake Mazza kick), 5:23 (WSU 14–7)
- STAN – Cameron Scarlett 2 yard run (Jet Toner kick), 1:22 (TIED 14–14)

Second quarter

- STAN – Kaden Smith 10 yard pass from K. J. Costello (Jet Toner kick), 9:25 (STAN 21–14)
- STAN – Houston Heimuli 1 yard pass from K. J. Costello (Jet Toner kick), 1:04 (STAN 28–14)
- WSU – Blake Mazza 23 yard field goal, 0:00 (STAN 28–17)

Third quarter

- WSU – James Williams 3 yard run (Blake Mazza kick), 10:32 (STAN 28–24)
- STAN – Jet Toner 40 yard field goal, 6:16 (STAN 31–24)

Fourth quarter

- WSU – Tay Martin 7 yard pass from Gardner Minshew (Blake Mazza kick), 12:26 (TIED 31–31)
- WSU – Renard Bell 3 yard pass from Gardner Minshew (Blake Mazza kick), 4:28 (WSU 38–31)
- STAN – J. J. Arcega-Whiteside 25 yard pass from K. J. Costello (Jet Toner kick), 1:25 (TIED 38–38)
- WSU – Blake Mazza 42 yard field goal, 0:19 (WSU 41–38)

Top passers

- WSU – Gardner Minshew – 40/50, 438 yards, 3 TD
- STAN – K. J. Costello – 34/43, 323 yards, 4 TD

Top rushers

- WSU – James Williams – 8 carries, 30 yards, 2 TD
- STAN – Bryce Love – 6 carries, 71 yards

Top receivers

- WSU – Dezmon Patmon – 10 receptions, 127 yards
- STAN – J. J. Arcega-Whiteside – 10 receptions, 111 yards, 2 TD

Top defenders

- WSU – Peyton Pelluer – 7 tackles, sack, TFL
- STAN – Sean Barton – 10 tackles, 0.5 TFL

=== California ===
California at Washington State– Game summary

Quarter	1	2	3	4	Total
Golden Bears	0	10	3	0	13
No. 10 Cougars	3	10	0	6	19

at Martin Stadium, Pullman, WA

- Date: November 3
- Game time: 7:50 p.m. PDT
- Game weather: 47 °F (8 °C); cloudy, rain
- Game attendance: 32,952
- Referee: Kevin Mar
- TV announcers (ESPN): Dave Pasch, Greg McElroy, Tom Luginbill
- wsucougars.com Game Notes wsucougars.com Box Score

Game information

First quarter

- WSU – Blake Mazza 29 yard field goal, 10:35 (WSU 3–0)

Second quarter

- CAL – Malik McMorris 2 yard pass from Chase Garbers (Greg Thomas kick), 11:00 (CAL 7–3)
- WSU – Max Borghi 5 yard run (Blake Mazza kick), 6:47 (WSU 10–7)
- CAL – Greg Thomas 42 yard field goal, 0:36 (TIED 10–10)
- WSU – Blake Mazza 36 yard field goal, 0:01 (WSU 13–10)

Third quarter

- CAL – Greg Thomas 46 yard field goal, 2:04 (TIED 13–13)

Fourth quarter

- WSU – Winston Easop, Jr. 10 yard pass from Gardner Minshew (Blake Mazza rush failed), 0:32 (WSU 19–13)

Top passers

- CAL – Chase Garbers – 15/26, 127 yards, TD, int
- WSU – Gardner Minshew – 35/51, 334 yards, TD, int

Top rushers

- CAL – Chase Garbers – 11 carries, 67 yards
- WSU – Max Borghi – 6 carries, 33 yards, TD

Top receivers

- CAL – Vic Wharton III – 4 receptions, 47 yards
- WSU – Easop Winston Jr. – 7 receptions, 92 yards, TD

Top defenders

- CAL – Jordan Kunaszyk – 9 tackles, sack, 1.5 TFL
- WSU – Peyton Pelluer – 10 tackles, 0.5 sack, 1.5 TFL

=== At Colorado ===
Washington State at Colorado – Game summary

Quarter	1	2	3	4	Total
No. 10 Cougars	0	10	7	14	31
Buffaloes	7	0	0	0	7

at Folsom Field, Boulder, CO

- Date: November 10
- Game time: 12:30 p.m. PDT
- Game weather: 57 °F (14 °C); mostly clear
- Game attendance: 45,587
- Referee: Chris Coyte
- TV announcers (ESPN): Bob Wischusen, Brock Huard, Allison Williams
- wsucougars.com Game Notes cubuffs.com Box Score

Game information

First quarter

- CU – Travon McMillian 3 yard run (Tyler Francis kick), 4:14 (CU 7–0)

Second quarter

- WSU – Blake Mazza 39 yard field goal, 13:37 (CU 7–3)
- WSU – Max Borghi 28 yard pass from Gardner Minshew (Blake Mazza kick), 8:31 (WSU 10–7)

Third quarter

- WSU – Renard Bell 1 yard pass from Gardner Minshew (Blake Mazza kick), 10:56 (WSU 17–7)

Fourth quarter

- WSU – Gardner Minshew 10 yard run (Blake Mazza kick), 14:27 (WSU 24–7)
- WSU – James Williams 3 yard run (Blake Mazza kick), 3:46 (WSU 31–7)

Top passers

- WSU – Gardner Minshew – 35/58, 335 yards, 2 TD
- CU – Steven Montez – 20/35, 199 yards

Top rushers

- WSU – James Williams – 17 carries, 60 yards, TD
- CU – Travon McMillian – 9 carries, 73 yards, TD

Top receivers

- WSU – Dezmon Patmon – 8 receptions, 103 yards
- CU – Laviska Shenault – 10 receptions, 102 yards

Top defenders

- WSU – Jahad Woods – 5 tackles, 2 FF, FR
- CU – Davion Taylor – 11 tackles, TFL

=== Arizona ===
Arizona at Washington State– Game summary

Quarter	1	2	3	4	Total
Wildcats	7	7	14	0	28
No. 8 Cougars	21	34	0	14	69

at Martin Stadium, Pullman, WA

- Date: November 17
- Game time: 7:35 p.m.PDT
- Game weather: 29 °F (−2 °C); clear
- Game attendance: 22,400
- Referee: Mike McCabe
- TV announcers (ESPN): Bob Wischusen, Brock Huard, Allison Williams
- wsucougars.com Box Score wsucougars.com Game Notes

Game information

First quarter

- WSU – James Williams 1 yard run (Blake Mazza kick), 10:44 (WSU 7–0)
- WSU – Max Borghi 1 yard run (Blake Mazza kick), 7:38 (WSU 14–0)
- ARIZ – Shawn Poindexter 24 yard pass from Khalil Tate (Lucas Havrisik kick), 3:19 (WSU 14–7)
- WSU – Calvin Jackson 27 yard pass from Gardner Minshew (Blake Mazza kick), 0:19 (WSU 21–7)

Second quarter

- WSU – Dezmon Patmon 11 yard pass from Gardner Minshew (Blake Mazza kick), 12:03 (WSU 28–7)
- ARIZ – Tony Ellison 37 yard pass from Khalil Tate (Lucas Havrisik kick), 10:43 (WSU 28–14)
- WSU – Calvin Jackson 6 yard pass from Gardner Minshew (Blake Mazza rush failed), 7:08 (WSU 34–14)
- WSU – Kainoa Wilson 0 yard fumble recovery (Blake Mazza kick), 7:04 (WSU 41–14)
- WSU – James Williams 9 yard pass from Gardner Minshew (Blake Mazza kick), 3:22 (WSU 48–14)
- WSU – Tay Martin 50 yard pass from Gardner Minshew (Blake Mazza kick), 0:10 (WSU 55–14)

Third quarter

- ARIZ – Shun Brown 2 yard pass from Khalil Tate (Lucas Havrisik kick), 12:18 (WSU 55–21)
- ARIZ – Shawn Poindexter 14 yard pass from Khalil Tate (Lucas Havrisik kick), 1:02 (WSU 55–28)

Fourth quarter

- WSU – Jamire Calvin 2 yard pass from Gardner Minshew (Blake Mazza rush failed), 12:37 (WSU 62–28)
- WSU – Easop Winston 9 yard pass from Gardner Minshew (Blake Mazza rush failed), 7:06 (WSU 69–28)

Top passers

- ARIZ – Khalil Tate – 18/30, 294 yards, 4 TD, int
- WSU – Gardner Minshew – 43/55, 473 yards, 7 TD

Top rushers

- ARIZ – J. J. Taylor – 20 carries, 69 yards
- WSU – Max Borghi – 8 carries, 50 yards, TD

Top receivers

- ARIZ – Shun Brown – 8 receptions, 37 yards, TD
- WSU – Tay Martin – 7 receptions, 124 yards, TD

Top defenders

- ARIZ – Colin Schooler – 13 tackles, 0.5 sacks, 2.5 TFL
- WSU – Jahad Woods – 11 tackles, 0.5 TFL, FF, FR

=== Washington ===
Washington at Washington State– Game summary

Quarter	1	2	3	4	Total
No. 16 Huskies	7	7	6	8	28
No. 7 Cougars	0	7	8	0	15

at Martin Stadium, Pullman, WA

- Date: November 23
- Game time: 5:45 p.m. PDT
- Game weather: 38 °F (3 °C); snow
- Game attendance: 32,952
- Referee: Steve Strimling
- TV announcers (FOX): Joe Davis, Brady Quinn, Bruce Feldman
- wsucougars.com Game Notes wsucougars.com Box Score

Game information

First quarter

- WASH – Myles Gaskin 5 yard run (Peyton Henry kick), 0:08 (WASH 7–0)

Second quarter

- WASH – Myles Gaskin 5 yard run (Peyton Henry kick), 5:37 (WASH 14–0)
- WSU – James Williams 11 yard run (Blake Mazza kick), 0:33 (WASH 14–7)

Third quarter

- WASH – Hunter Bryant 22 yard pass from Aaron Fuller (Peyton Henry kick blocked), 12:40 (WASH 20–7)
- WSU – Hunter Dale PAT return, 12:40 (WASH 20–9)
- WSU – James Williams 1 yard run (Gardner Minshew pass failed), 4:44 (WASH 20–15)

Fourth quarter

- WASH – Myles Gaskin 80 yard run (Salvon Ahmed rush), 12:30 (WASH 28–15)

Top passers

- WASH – Jake Browning – 11/14, 207 yards, int
- WSU – Gardner Minshew – 26/35, 152 yards, 2 int

Top rushers

- WASH – Myles Gaskin – 27 carries, 170 yards, 3 TD
- WSU – James Williams – 11 carries, 65 yards, 2 TD

Top receivers

- WASH – Hunter Bryant – 3 receptions, 108 yards, TD
- WSU – Max Borghi – 7 receptions, 49 yards

Top defenders

- WASH – Ben Burr-Kirven – 10 tackles, FR, int
- WSU – Peyton Pelluer – 10 tackles, 1.5 TFL

=== Vs. Iowa State (Alamo Bowl) ===
Alamo Bowl– Game summary

Quarter	1	2	3	4	Total
No. 25 Cyclones	0	10	10	6	26
No. 12 Cougars	7	14	0	7	28

at Alamodome, San Antonio, TX

- Date: December 28
- Game time: 6:00 p.m. PDT
- Game weather: 72 °F (22 °C), Indoors
- Game attendance: 60,675
- Referee: John O'Neil
- TV announcers (ESPN): Dave Pasch, Greg McElroy and Tom Luginbill

Game information

First quarter

- WSU – Renard Bell 22 yard pass from Gardner Minshew (Blake Mazza kick), 6:55 (WSU 7–0)

Second quarter

- WSU – Gardner Minshew 7 yard run (Blake Mazza kick), 6:08 (WSU 14–0)
- ISU – Brock Purdy 9 yard run (Connor Assalley kick), 4:26 (WSU 14–7)
- WSU – Dezmon Patmon 9 yard pass from Gardner Minshew (Blake Mazza kick), 1:02 (WSU 21–7)
- ISU – Connor Assalley 50 yard field goal, 0:00 (WSU 21–10)

Third quarter

- ISU – David Montgomery 8 yard run (Connor Assalley kick), 12:11 (WSU 21–17)
- ISU – Connor Assalley 23 yard field goal, 1:04 (WSU 21–20)

Fourth quarter

- WSU – Max Borghi 10 yard run (Blake Mazza kick), 10:24 (WSU 28–20)
- ISU – Brock Purdy 1 yard run (pass failed), 4:02 (WSU 28–26)

Top passers

- ISU – Brock Purdy – 18/27, 315 yards, 2 int
- WSU – Gardner Minshew – 35/49, 299 yards, 2 TD

Top rushers

- ISU – David Montgomery – 25 carries, 124 yards, TD
- WSU – Gardner Minshew – 6 carries, 16 yards, TD

Top receivers

- ISU – Hakeem Butler – 9 receptions, 192 yards
- WSU – Dezmon Patmon – 6 receptions, 76 yards, TD

Top defenders

- ISU – Marcel Spears Jr. – 8 tackles, 0.5 sacks
- WSU – Peyton Pelluer – 10 tackles, sack

== Awards ==
Player	Award	Date
Gardner Minshew	Pac-12 Offensive Player of the Week	September 17, 2018
Travell Harris	Pac-12 Special Teams Player of the Week	September 17, 2018
Jahad Woods	Pac-12 Defensive Player of the Week	November 19, 2018

Pac-12 Offensive Player of the Year: Gardner Minshew II
Pac-12 Coach of the Year: Mike Leach

== NFL draft ==
Washington State had two players selected in the 2018 NFL Draft.

Player	Position	Round	Overall	NFL club
Andre Dillard	OT	1	22	Philadelphia Eagles
Gardner Minshew	QB	6	178	Jacksonville Jaguars
