= 2018 Oregon Ducks football team =

American college football season

2018 Oregon Ducks football

Redbox Bowl champion

Redbox Bowl, W 7–6 vs. Michigan State
- Conference: Pac-12 Conference
- North Division
- Record: 9–4 (5–4 Pac-12)
- Head coach: Mario Cristobal (1st season)
- Offensive coordinator: Marcus Arroyo (2nd season)
- Offensive scheme: Pistol
- Defensive coordinator: Jim Leavitt (2nd season)
- Base defense: Hybrid 3–4/3–3–5
- Captain: Game captains
- Home stadium: Autzen Stadium

2018 Pac-12 Conference football standings
	Conf.			Overall
Team	W		L	W		L
North Division
No. 13 Washington xy$	7	–	2	10	–	4
No. 10 Washington State x	7	–	2	11	–	2
Stanford	6	–	3	9	–	4
Oregon	5	–	4	9	–	4
California	4	–	5	7	–	6
Oregon State	1	–	8	2	–	10
South Division
Utah xy	6	–	3	9	–	5
Arizona State	5	–	4	7	–	6
USC	4	–	5	5	–	7
Arizona	4	–	5	5	–	7
UCLA	3	–	6	3	–	9
Colorado	2	–	7	5	–	7
Championship: Washington 10, Utah 3
$ – Conference champion; x – Division champion/co-champions; y – Championship game participant; Rankings from AP Poll

The 2018 Oregon Ducks football team represented the University of Oregon during the 2018 NCAA Division I FBS football season. The team was led by first-year head coach Mario Cristobal who took over for Willie Taggart who departed for Florida State. Oregon played their games at Autzen Stadium and competed as members of the North Division of the Pac-12 Conference.

Coming off a 7–6 season under Taggart in 2017, Oregon began the year ranked 24th in the preseason AP Poll. After sweeping their non-conference slate, they fell to then-No. 7 Stanford in overtime. The team bounced back with wins over No. 24 California and No. 7 Washington and rose to 12th in the polls before losing three of their next four games. The Ducks finished the regular season in fourth in the Pac-12 North Division with a conference record of 5–4. They were invited to the Redbox Bowl, where they defeated Michigan State to end the year at 9–4 overall.

The Oregon offense was led by junior quarterback Justin Herbert, who finished in second the Pac-12 Conference with 31 total touchdowns (29 passing and 2 rushing). Running back C. J. Verdell finished with 1,018 rushing yards and 10 rushing touchdowns. Defensively, the team was led by defensive end Jalen Jelks, who was named first-team all-conference.

== Preseason ==
=== Award watch lists ===
Listed in the order that they were released

Award	Player	Position	Year
Lott Trophy	Troy Dye	LB	JR
Rimington Trophy	Jake Hanson	C	JR
Chuck Bednarik Award	Jalen Jelks	DE	SR
Chuck Bednarik Award	Troy Dye	LB	JR
Maxwell Award	Justin Herbert	QB	JR
Davey O'Brien Award	Justin Herbert	QB	JR
Doak Walker Award	Tony Brooks-James	RB	SR
John Mackey Award	Jake Breeland	TE	JR
Butkus Award	Troy Dye	LB	JR
Butkus Award	Justin Hollins	LB	JR
Bronko Nagurski Trophy	Troy Dye	LB	JR
Bronko Nagurski Trophy	Jalen Jelks	DE	SR
Bronko Nagurski Trophy	Jordon Scott	DL	SO
Outland Trophy	Jake Hanson	C	JR
Outland Trophy	Jordon Scott	DL	SO
Outland Trophy	Calvin Throckmorton	OL	JR
Paul Hornung Award	Tony Brooks-James	RB/KR	SR
Wuerffel Trophy	Justin Herbert	QB	JR
Ted Hendricks Award	Jalen Jelks	DE	SR
Johnny Unitas Golden Arm Award	Justin Herbert	QB	JR

=== Pac-12 media days ===
The 2018 Pac-12 media days were set for July 25, 2018 in Hollywood, California. Mario Cristobal (HC), Justin Herbert (QB) & Jalen Jelks (DL) at Pac-12 Media Days. The Pac-12 media poll was released with the Ducks predicted to finish in third place at Pac-12 North division.

== Schedule ==
Date	Time	Opponent	Rank	Site	TV	Result	Attendance
September 1	5:00 p.m.	Bowling Green*	No. 24	Autzen Stadium; Eugene, OR	P12N	W 58–24	50,112
September 8	11:00 a.m.	Portland State*	No. 23	Autzen Stadium; Eugene, OR	P12N	W 62–14	47,210
September 15	2:00 p.m.	San Jose State*	No. 20	Autzen Stadium; Eugene, OR	P12N	W 35–22	50,049
September 22	5:00 p.m.	No. 7 Stanford	No. 20	Autzen Stadium; Eugene, OR (rivalry, College GameDay)	ABC	L 31–38 ^{OT}	58,453
September 29	7:30 p.m.	at No. 24 California	No. 19	California Memorial Stadium; Berkeley, CA	FS1	W 42–24	43,448
October 13	12:30 p.m.	No. 7 Washington	No. 17	Autzen Stadium; Eugene, OR (rivalry)	ABC/ESPN2	W 30–27 ^{OT}	58,691
October 20	4:30 p.m.	at No. 25 Washington State	No. 12	Martin Stadium; Pullman, WA (College GameDay)	FOX	L 20–34	33,152
October 27	7:30 p.m.	at Arizona	No. 19	Arizona Stadium; Tucson, AZ	ESPN	L 15–44	42,845
November 3	4:30 p.m.	UCLA		Autzen Stadium; Eugene, OR	FOX	W 42–21	56,114
November 10	2:30 p.m.	at Utah		Rice–Eccles Stadium; Salt Lake City, UT	P12N	L 25–32	46,275
November 17	7:30 p.m.	Arizona State		Autzen Stadium; Eugene, OR	P12N	W 31–29	50,485
November 23	1:00 p.m.	at Oregon State		Reser Stadium; Corvallis, OR (Civil War)	FS1	W 55–15	39,776
December 31	12:00 p.m.	vs. Michigan State*		Levi's Stadium; Santa Clara, CA (Redbox Bowl)	FOX	W 7–6	30,212
*Non-conference game; Rankings from AP Poll released prior to the game; All times are in Pacific time

== Personnel ==
2018 Oregon Ducks football team roster
Players
Coaches
Offense

Pos.	#	Name	Class
WR	3	Johnny Johnson III	So
WR	9	Brenden Schooler	Jr
QB	10	Justin Herbert	Jr
QB	11	Braxton Burmeister	So
QB	12	Tyler Shough	Fr
WR	13	Dillon Mitchell	Jr
WR	14	Demetri Burch	Fr
QB	16	Bradley Yaffe	Fr
QB	17	Mike Irwin	Fr
WR	17	Tevin Jeannis	Fr
TE	18	Spencer Webb	Fr
RB	20	Tony Brooks-James	Sr
RB	22	Darrian Felix	So
WR	24	Vincenzo Logan	Fr
WR	25	Kyle Buckner	Jr
RB	25	Travis Dye	Fr
TE	27	Jake Breeland	Jr
WR	29	John Keller	Jr
WR	30	Jaylon Redd	So
RB	31	KJ Maduike	Fr
RB	33	Cyrus Habibi-Likio	Fr
RB	34	C. J. Verdell	Fr
WR	37	Noah Holmes	Fr
RB	40	Noah Dahl	So
RB	43	Demarques Singleton	Fr
TE	44	Matt Mariota	Jr
TE	48	Hunter Kampmoyer	So
OL	52	Cody Shear	Fr
OL	53	Ryan Walk	Fr
OL	54	Calvin Throckmorton	Jr
OL	55	Jake Hanson	Jr
OL	58	Penei Sewell	Fr
OL	59	Devin Lewis	Fr
OL	64	Charlie Landgraf	Jr
OL	66	Brady Aiello	Jr
OL	68	Shane Lemieux	Jr
OL	70	Dawson Jaramillo	Fr
OL	72	Sam Poutasi	So
OL	73	Justin Johnson	Fr
OL	74	Steven Jones	Fr
OL	75	Dallas Warmack	Jr
OL	77	George Moore	Jr
OL	78	Alex Forsyth	Fr
OL	79	Chris Randazzo	Fr
WR	80	Bryan Addison	Fr
WR	81	Daewood Davis	Fr
WR	82	Justin Collins	So
WR	82	Jack Vecchi	Fr
WR	83	Alfonso Cobb	So
TE	84	Cameron McCormick	So
TE	85	Kano Dillon	Sr
WR	86	Korbin Williams	Fr
TE	87	Ryan Bay	Jr
WR	88	Isaah Crocker	Fr
WR	89	JJ Tucker	Fr

Defense

Pos.	#	Name	Class
DB	4	Thomas Graham Jr.	So
DB	7	Ugo Amadi	Sr
DB	8	Jevon Holland	Fr
DB	10	Steve Stephens	Fr
LB	11	Justin Hollins	Sr
DB	12	Haki Woods Jr.	Sr
DB	15	Deommodore Lenoir	So
DB	16	Nick Pickett	So
DB	21	Mattrell McGraw	Sr
DB	23	Verone McKinley III	Fr
LB	24	Keith Simms	So
DB	25	Brady Breeze	So
DB	26	Damon Hickok	Fr
DB	27	Dexter Myers	So
DB	28	Billy Gibson	So
LB	29	Adrian Jackson	Fr
LB	30	Andrew Johnson Jr.	Fr
DB	31	Sean Killpatrick	Jr
LB	32	La'Mar Winston Jr.	Jr
DB	33	Jordan Adeyemi-John	Fr
DL	34	Jordon Scott	So
LB	35	Troy Dye	Jr
DB	36	Charles Sudduth	Jr
DB	37	Kahlef Hailassie	Fr
DB	38	Lucas Noland	Fr
LB	41	Isaac Slade-Matautia	Fr
LB	42	MJ Cunningham	Fr
LB	43	Nick Weibe	Fr
LB	44	D. J. Johnson	So
DL	45	Gus Cumberlander	Jr
LB	46	Nate Heaukulani	Jr
DB	46	Elijah Jones	Sr
LB	47	Anthony Booker	Fr
LB	48	Isaiah Pitre	Fr
DB	49	Tyler Reid	Sr
DL	50	Popo Aumavae	Fr
DL	51	Gary Baker	Jr
DL	52	Andrew Faoliu	Fr
LB	53	Matt Christman	Jr
LB	55	Sampson Nou	So
DL	56	Bryson Young	Jr
LB	57	Ben Gomes	Jr
LB	59	Pou Peleti-Gore	Sr
DL	90	Drayton Carlberg	Jr
LB	91	Avery Burt	Fr
DL	92	Miguel Nevarez	Fr
DL	93	Sione Kava	Jr
DL	94	DJ Wong	Sr
DL	97	Jalen Jelks	Sr
LB	98	Chris Beedles	Fr
DL	99	Austin Faoliu	So

Special teams

Pos.	#	Name	Class
K	36	Jace Krier	Fr
K	38	Tom Snee	Fr
K	40	Zach Emerson	So
P	42	Blake Maimone	Jr
LS	47	Peyton Yanagi	Fr
LS	49	Devin Melendez	Sr
LS	63	Karsten Battles	Fr
K	90	Henry Katleman	Fr
K	91	Taylor Koth	Fr
K	96	Adam Stack	So

Head coach

- Mario Cristobal

Coordinators/assistant coaches

- Joe Salave'a – Associate head coach / co-defensive coordinator / defensive line
- Marcus Arroyo – Assistant head coach / offensive coordinator / quarterbacks & tight ends
- Jim Leavitt – Co-defensive coordinator / inside linebackers
- Keith Heyward – Co-defensive coordinator / Safeties
- Bobby Williams – Special teams coordinator
- Michael Johnson – Wide receivers
- Jim Mastro – Running backs / run game coordinator
- Alex Mirabal – Offensive line
- Cort Dennison – Outside linebackers
- Donte Williams – Cornerbacks
- Aaron Feld – Strength and conditioning
- Matt Fyle – Assistant strength and conditioning coordinator
- Shaud Williams – Assistant strength and conditioning coordinator
- Mark Davis – Assistant strength and conditioning coordinator
- Ikaika Johnson – Graduate assistant
- Jonathan Krause – Graduate assistant
- Tre Watson – Graduate assistant
- Cody Woodiel – Graduate assistant
- Kwame Agyeman – Defensive analyst
- Rod Chance – Defensive analyst
- David Gilbertson – Offensive analyst
- Danny Langsdorf – Offensive analyst
- Chris Norris – Special teams analyst
- Matt Noyer – Director, football operations
- Kodi Look – Assistant director of football operations
- Stephen Field – Director, recruiting
- Funaki Asisi – Recruiting assistant / player development
- Matt Leitch – Recruiting assistant
- Eli Miller – Recruiting assistant
- Da'Vell Winters – Recruiting assistant / player development
- Thomas Arends – Director, player personnel / pro liaison
- Ryan Bartow – Director, high school relations
- Cassidy Noyer – Director, external relations
- Josh Heim – Director, digital media
- Alex Verdugo – Director, graphic design & social media
- Dustin Smith – Video coordinator
- Steve Poehl – Video production coordinator
- Kenny Farr – Football equipment administrator
- Taylor Hughes – Sports dietitian

Legend

- (C) Team captain
- (S) Suspended
- (I) Ineligible
- Injured
- Redshirt

Roster

== Game summaries ==
=== Bowling Green ===
	1	2	3	4	Total
Falcons	10	7	7	0	24
No. 24 Ducks	7	30	14	7	58

Uniform combination
Helmet	Jersey	Pants

=== Portland State ===
	1	2	3	4	Total
Vikings	0	7	0	7	14
No. 23 Ducks	14	21	14	13	62

Uniform combination
Helmet	Jersey	Pants

=== San Jose State ===
	1	2	3	4	Total
Spartans	0	6	6	10	22
No. 20 Ducks	14	7	7	7	35

Uniform combination
Helmet	Jersey	Pants

=== Stanford ===
	1	2	3	4	OT	Total
No. 7 Cardinal	0	7	14	10	7	38
No. 20 Ducks	7	17	0	7	0	31

Uniform combination
Helmet	Jersey	Pants

=== At California ===
	1	2	3	4	Total
No. 19 Ducks	7	21	7	7	42
No. 24 Golden Bears	3	7	7	7	24

Uniform combination
Helmet	Jersey	Pants

=== Washington ===
	1	2	3	4	OT	Total
No. 7 Huskies	10	7	7	0	3	27
No. 17 Ducks	10	7	7	0	6	30

Uniform combination
Helmet	Jersey	Pants

=== At Washington State ===
	1	2	3	4	Total
No. 12 Ducks	0	0	17	3	20
No. 25 Cougars	7	20	0	7	34

Uniform combination
Helmet	Jersey	Pants

=== At Arizona ===
	1	2	3	4	Total
No. 19 Ducks	0	8	0	7	15
Wildcats	10	13	14	7	44

Uniform combination
Helmet	Jersey	Pants

=== UCLA ===
	1	2	3	4	Total
Bruins	0	7	7	7	21
Ducks	14	7	7	14	42

Uniform combination
Helmet	Jersey	Pants

=== At Utah ===
	1	2	3	4	Total
Ducks	0	7	10	8	25
Utes	10	9	3	10	32

Uniform combination
Helmet	Jersey	Pants

=== Arizona State ===
	1	2	3	4	Total
Sun Devils	3	10	3	13	29
Ducks	7	21	0	3	31

Uniform combination
Helmet	Jersey	Pants

=== At Oregon State ===
	1	2	3	4	Total
Ducks	14	7	13	21	55
Beavers	0	3	6	6	15

Uniform combination
Helmet	Jersey	Pants

=== Vs. Michigan State (Redbox Bowl) ===
	1	2	3	4	Total
Spartans	0	0	6	0	6
Ducks	0	0	0	7	7

Uniform combination
Helmet	Jersey	Pants

== Rankings ==
Ranking movements Legend: ██ Increase in ranking ██ Decrease in ranking — = Not ranked RV = Received votes
	Week																
Poll	Pre	1	2	3	4	5	6	7	8	9	10	11	12	13	14	15	Final
AP	24	23	20	20	19	18	17	12	19	RV	—	—	—	RV	RV	RV	RV
Coaches	RV	RV	23	19	20	18	17	11	21	RV	—	—	—	RV	RV	RV	RV
CFP	Not released									—	—	—	—	—	—	—	Not released

== Players drafted into the NFL ==
The Ducks had four players selected in the 2019 NFL Draft.

Round	Pick	Player	Position	NFL Club
4	132	Ugo Amadi	S	Seattle Seahawks
5	156	Justin Hollins	LB	Denver Broncos
7	239	Dillon Mitchell	WR	Minnesota Vikings
7	241	Jalen Jelks	DE	Dallas Cowboys
