= 2018 Utah Utes football team =

American college football season

2018 Utah Utes football

Pac-12 South Division champion

Pac-12 Championship Game, L 3–10 vs. Washington

Holiday Bowl, L 20–31 vs. Northwestern
- Conference: Pac-12 Conference
- South Division
- Record: 9–5 (6–3 Pac-12)
- Head coach: Kyle Whittingham (14th season)
- Offensive coordinator: Troy Taylor (2nd season)
- Offensive scheme: West Coast
- Defensive coordinator: Morgan Scalley (3rd season)
- Base defense: 4–3
- Home stadium: Rice–Eccles Stadium

Uniform
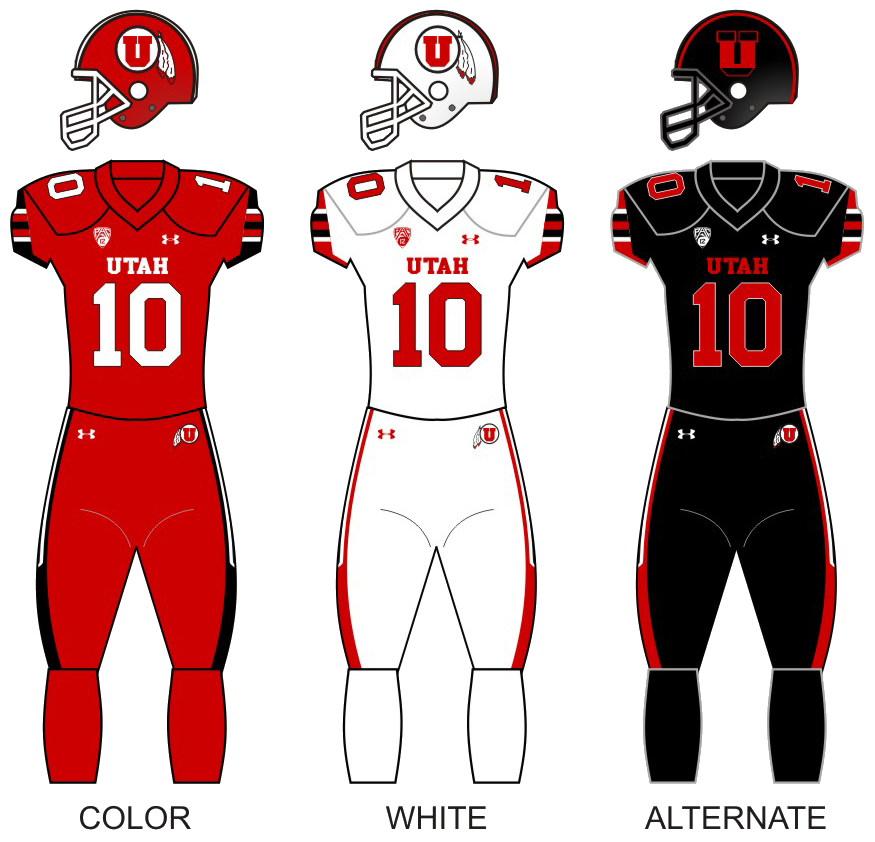

2018 Pac-12 Conference football standings
	Conf.			Overall
Team	W		L	W		L
North Division
No. 13 Washington xy$	7	–	2	10	–	4
No. 10 Washington State x	7	–	2	11	–	2
Stanford	6	–	3	9	–	4
Oregon	5	–	4	9	–	4
California	4	–	5	7	–	6
Oregon State	1	–	8	2	–	10
South Division
Utah xy	6	–	3	9	–	5
Arizona State	5	–	4	7	–	6
USC	4	–	5	5	–	7
Arizona	4	–	5	5	–	7
UCLA	3	–	6	3	–	9
Colorado	2	–	7	5	–	7
Championship: Washington 10, Utah 3
$ – Conference champion; x – Division champion/co-champions; y – Championship game participant; Rankings from AP Poll

The 2018 Utah Utes football team represented the University of Utah during the 2018 NCAA Division I FBS football season. The Utes were led by 14th-year head coach Kyle Whittingham and played their home games in Rice–Eccles Stadium in Salt Lake City, UT. They were members of the South Division of the Pac-12 Conference.

The Utes completed the regular season with a 6–3 record in conference play, winning the South Division for the first time since joining the Pac-12 Conference in 2011. In the Pac-12 Championship Game, the team lost to North Division champion Washington by a score of 10–3. They were invited to the Holiday Bowl to play Big Ten Conference runner-up Northwestern, where the Utes lost by a score of 31–20 to end the year at 9–5 overall.

Utah was led on offense by quarterback Tyler Huntley until he suffered a season-ending collarbone fracture in the game against Arizona State on November 3. Redshirt freshman Jason Shelley started for the rest of the season. Running back Zack Moss compiled 1,096 rushing yards and 11 touchdowns. Two members of the Utah offensive line earned first-team all-conference honors, Jordan Agasiva and Jackson Barton. Utah's defense featured four members of the first-team All-Pac-12: defensive linemen Bradlee Anae and Leki Fotu, linebacker Chase Hansen, and cornerback Jaylon Johnson. Hansen led the conference in tackles for loss with 22, and Anae tied for the conference lead in sacks with 8.

== Preseason ==
=== Recruits ===
The Utes signed a total of 20 recruits.

College recruiting (2018)
Name	Hometown	School	Height	Weight	Commit date
Hunter Lotulelei; OG	Salt Lake City, Utah	Highland High School	6 ft 2 in (1.88 m)	213 lb (97 kg)	Jun 17, 2016
Hunter Lotulelei; OG	Recruit ratings: Scout: Rivals: 247Sports: ESPN:				
Jack Tuttle; QB	San Marcos, California	Mission Hills High School	6 ft 4 in (1.93 m)	195 lb (88 kg)	Dec 16, 2016
Jack Tuttle; QB	Recruit ratings: Scout: Rivals: 247Sports: ESPN:				
Malone Mataele; DB	Rancho Santa Margarita, California	Santa Margarita Catholic High School	5 ft 11 in (1.80 m)	170 lb (77 kg)	Apr 21, 2017
Malone Mataele; DB	Recruit ratings: Scout: Rivals: 247Sports: ESPN:				
Tevita Fotu; TE	Herriman, Utah	Herriman High School	6 ft 4 in (1.93 m)	250 lb (110 kg)	Oct 8, 2017
Tevita Fotu; TE	Recruit ratings: Scout: Rivals: 247Sports: ESPN:				
Terrell Perriman; WR	Miami, Florida	Miami Central High School	5 ft 10 in (1.78 m)	176 lb (80 kg)	Nov 3, 2017
Terrell Perriman; WR	Recruit ratings: Scout: Rivals: 247Sports: ESPN:				
Braeden Daniels; OL	Carrollton, Texas	Hebron High School	6 ft 4 in (1.93 m)	260 lb (120 kg)	Dec 17, 2017
Braeden Daniels; OL	Recruit ratings: Scout: Rivals: 247Sports: ESPN:				
Jeremiah Jordan; DE	Stone Mountain, Georgia	Mt. San Jacinto College	6 ft 6 in (1.98 m)	250 lb (110 kg)	Dec 17, 2017
Jeremiah Jordan; DE	Recruit ratings: Scout: Rivals: 247Sports: ESPN:				
Bryant Pirtle; LB	Louisville, Kentucky	Pima Community College	6 ft 3 in (1.91 m)	235 lb (107 kg)	Dec 20, 2017
Bryant Pirtle; LB	Recruit ratings: Scout: Rivals: 247Sports: ESPN:				
Paul Maile; DT	Salt Lake City, Utah	East High School	6 ft 3 in (1.91 m)	250 lb (110 kg)	Dec 23, 2017
Paul Maile; DT	Recruit ratings: Scout: Rivals: 247Sports: ESPN:				
Andrew Mataafa; LB	San Diego, California	San Diego High School	6 ft 4 in (1.93 m)	205 lb (93 kg)	Dec 29, 2017
Andrew Mataafa; LB	Recruit ratings: Scout: Rivals: 247Sports: ESPN:				
Vonte Davis; CB	Rosenberg, Texas	Blinn College	6 ft 1 in (1.85 m)	180 lb (82 kg)	Jan 14, 2018
Vonte Davis; CB	Recruit ratings: Scout: Rivals: 247Sports: ESPN:				
Blake Kuithe; DE	Katy, Texas	Cinco Ranch High School	6 ft 2 in (1.88 m)	230 lb (100 kg)	Jan 14, 2018
Blake Kuithe; DE	Recruit ratings: Scout: Rivals: 247Sports: ESPN:				
Brant Kuithe; WR	Katy, Texas	Cinco Ranch High School	6 ft 3 in (1.91 m)	212 lb (96 kg)	Jan 14, 2018
Brant Kuithe; WR	Recruit ratings: Scout: Rivals: 247Sports: ESPN:				
Jackson Cravens; DT	Provo, Utah	Timpview High School	6 ft 3 in (1.91 m)	285 lb (129 kg)	Feb 3, 2018
Jackson Cravens; DT	Recruit ratings: Scout: Rivals: 247Sports: ESPN:				
Thomas Yassmin; TE	New South Wales, Australia	The Scots College	6 ft 4 in (1.93 m)	230 lb (100 kg)	Feb 6, 2018
Thomas Yassmin; TE	Recruit ratings: Scout: Rivals: 247Sports: ESPN:				
Devin Brumfield; RB	Covington, Louisiana	Covington High School	5 ft 10 in (1.78 m)	219 lb (99 kg)	Feb 7, 2018
Devin Brumfield; RB	Recruit ratings: Scout: Rivals: 247Sports: ESPN:				
Solomon Enis; WR	Phoenix, Arizona	North Canyon High School	6 ft 4 in (1.93 m)	190 lb (86 kg)	Feb 7, 2018
Solomon Enis; WR	Recruit ratings: Scout: Rivals: 247Sports: ESPN:				
Simi Moala; DE	Hawthorne, California	Cathedral High School	6 ft 7 in (2.01 m)	250 lb (110 kg)	Feb 7, 2018
Simi Moala; DE	Recruit ratings: Scout: Rivals: 247Sports: ESPN:				
Mika Tafua; DE	Maui, Hawaii	Kamehameha Schools	6 ft 3 in (1.91 m)	210 lb (95 kg)	Feb 7, 2018
Mika Tafua; DE	Recruit ratings: Scout: Rivals: 247Sports: ESPN:				
Tareke Lewis; CB	Palatka, Florida	Riverside City College	6 ft 1 in (1.85 m)	170 lb (77 kg)	Feb 7, 2018
Tareke Lewis; CB	Recruit ratings: Scout: Rivals: 247Sports: ESPN:				
Overall recruit ranking:
Note: In many cases, Scout, Rivals, 247Sports, On3, and ESPN may conflict in their listings of height and weight.; In these cases, the average was taken. ESPN grades are on a 100-point scale.; Sources: "Utah Football Commitments". Rivals.; "2018 Team Ranking". Rivals.com.

=== Award watch lists ===
Listed in the order that they were released

Award	Player	Position	Year
Lott Trophy	Chase Hansen	LB	SR
Rimington Trophy	Lo Falemaka	C	SR
Chuck Bednarik Award	Julian Blackmon	CB	JR
Chuck Bednarik Award	Bradlee Anae	DE	JR
Maxwell Award	Zack Moss	RB	JR
Doak Walker Award	Zack Moss	RB	JR
Bronko Nagurski Trophy	Julian Blackmon	CB	JR
Outland Trophy	Lo Falemaka	C	SR
Lou Groza Award	Matt Gay	K	SR
Ray Guy Award	Mitch Wishnowsky	P	SR
Wuerffel Trophy	Chase Hansen	DB	SR
Johnny Unitas Golden Arm Award	Tyler Huntley	QB	JR

=== Pac-12 media days ===
The 2018 Pac-12 media days were set for July 25, 2018 in Hollywood, California. Kyle Whittingham (HC), Chase Hanson (LB) & Lo Falemaka (OL) at Pac-12 Media Days. The Pac-12 media poll was released with the Utes predicted to finish in second place at Pac-12 South division.

== Schedule ==
Utah announced their 2018 football schedule on November 16, 2017. The Utes will play FCS Weber State and Northern Illinois and returning to the traditional last game of the year spot, Utah will play in-state rival BYU Cougars football in out-of-conference play. In Pac-12 conference play, the Utes will not play cross-divisional foes California and Oregon State.

Date	Time	Opponent	Rank	Site	TV	Result	Attendance
August 30	6:00 p.m.	No. 8 (FCS) Weber State*		Rice–Eccles Stadium; Salt Lake City, UT	P12N	W 41–10	45,988
September 8	5:30 p.m.	at Northern Illinois*		Huskie Stadium; DeKalb, IL	ESPNews	W 17–6	16,762
September 15	8:00 p.m.	No. 10 Washington		Rice–Eccles Stadium; Salt Lake City, UT	ESPN	L 7–21	47,445
September 29	4:00 p.m.	at Washington State		Martin Stadium; Pullman, WA	P12N	L 24–28	30,088
October 6	8:30 p.m.	at No. 14 Stanford		Stanford Stadium; Stanford, CA	ESPN	W 40–21	37,244
October 12	8:00 p.m.	Arizona		Rice–Eccles Stadium; Salt Lake City, UT	ESPN	W 42–10	45,862
October 20	6:00 p.m.	USC^{†}		Rice–Eccles Stadium; Salt Lake City, UT	P12N	W 41–28	46,405
October 26	8:30 p.m.	at UCLA	No. 23	Rose Bowl; Pasadena, CA	ESPN	W 41–10	41,848
November 3	2:00 p.m.	at Arizona State	No. 15	Sun Devil Stadium; Tempe, AZ	P12N	L 20–38	46,445
November 10	3:30 p.m.	Oregon		Rice–Eccles Stadium; Salt Lake City, UT	P12N	W 32–25	46,275
November 17	11:30 a.m.	at Colorado	No. 19	Folsom Field; Boulder, CO (Rumble in the Rockies)	P12N	W 30–7	39,360
November 24	8:00 p.m.	BYU*	No. 17	Rice–Eccles Stadium; Salt Lake City, UT (Holy War/Beehive Boot)	FS1	W 35–27	46,017
November 30	6:00 p.m.	vs. No. 11 Washington	No. 17	Levi's Stadium; Santa Clara, CA (Pac-12 Championship Game)	FOX	L 3–10	35,134
December 31	5:00 p.m.	vs. No. 22 Northwestern*	No. 17	SDCCU Stadium; San Diego, CA (Holiday Bowl)	FS1	L 20–31	47,007
*Non-conference game; ^{†}Homecoming; Rankings from AP Poll and CFP Rankings after October 30 released prior to game; All times are in Mountain time

== Game summaries ==
=== Weber State ===
	1	2	3	4	Total
No. 8 (FCS) Wildcats	10	0	0	0	10
Utes	7	10	14	10	41

=== At Northern Illinois ===
	1	2	3	4	Total
Utes	0	0	7	10	17
Huskies	3	0	0	3	6

=== Washington ===
	1	2	3	4	Total
No. 10 Huskies	7	7	7	0	21
Utes	7	0	0	0	7

=== At Washington State ===
	1	2	3	4	Total
Utes	14	7	3	0	24
Cougars	7	14	0	7	28

=== At Stanford ===
	1	2	3	4	Total
Utes	7	17	3	13	40
No. 14 Cardinal	0	7	14	0	21

=== Arizona ===
	1	2	3	4	Total
Wildcats	0	0	3	7	10
Utes	14	14	7	7	42

=== USC ===
	1	2	3	4	Total
Trojans	14	0	0	14	28
Utes	7	13	14	7	41

=== At UCLA ===
	1	2	3	4	Total
No. 23 Utes	3	14	21	3	41
Bruins	7	0	3	0	10

=== At Arizona State ===
	1	2	3	4	Total
No. 16 Utes	7	10	3	0	20
Sun Devils	14	7	0	17	38

=== Oregon ===
	1	2	3	4	Total
Ducks	0	7	10	8	25
Utes	10	9	3	10	32

=== At Colorado ===
	1	2	3	4	Total
No. 21 Utes	0	7	17	6	30
Buffaloes	7	0	0	0	7

=== BYU ===
	1	2	3	4	Total
Cougars	13	7	7	0	27
No. 18 Utes	0	0	14	21	35

The Utes scored 28 unanswered points and overcame a 27–7 deficit in the third quarter to defeat their in-state rival, the BYU Cougars, for the eighth consecutive time.

=== Vs. Washington (Pac-12 Championship game) ===
	1	2	3	4	Total
No. 17 Utes	0	0	3	0	3
No. 10 Huskies	0	3	7	0	10

=== Vs. Northwestern (Holiday Bowl) ===
	1	2	3	4	Total
No. 20 Utes	14	6	0	0	20
Wildcats	0	3	28	0	31

== Rankings ==
Ranking movements Legend: ██ Increase in ranking ██ Decrease in ranking — = Not ranked RV = Received votes
	Week															
Poll	Pre	1	2	3	4	5	6	7	8	9	10	11	12	13	14	Final
AP	RV	RV	RV	RV	RV	—	RV	RV	23	16	RV	21	18	17	20	RV
Coaches	RV	RV	RV	RV	RV	—	RV	RV	24	16	24	19	17	17	19	RV
CFP	Not released									15	—	19	17	17	17	Not released

== Players drafted into the NFL ==
The Utes had five players drafted in the 2019 NFL draft.

Round	Pick	Player	Position	NFL Club
2	47	Marquise Blair	S	Seattle Seahawks
3	88	Cody Barton	LB	Seattle Seahawks
4	110	Mitch Wishnowsky	P	San Francisco 49ers
5	145	Matt Gay	K	Tampa Bay Buccaneers
7	240	Jackson Barton	OT	Indianapolis Colts
