= 2018 Colorado Buffaloes football team =

American college football season

2018 Colorado Buffaloes football
- Conference: Pac-12 Conference
- South Division
- Record: 5–7 (2–7 Pac-12)
- Head coach: Mike MacIntyre (6th season; first 11 games); Kurt Roper (interim; game 12)
- Co-offensive coordinators: Klayton Adams (6th season); Darrin Chiaverini (3rd season)
- Offensive scheme: Pro-style
- Defensive coordinator: D. J. Eliot (2nd season)
- Base defense: 3–4
- Home stadium: Folsom Field

Uniform
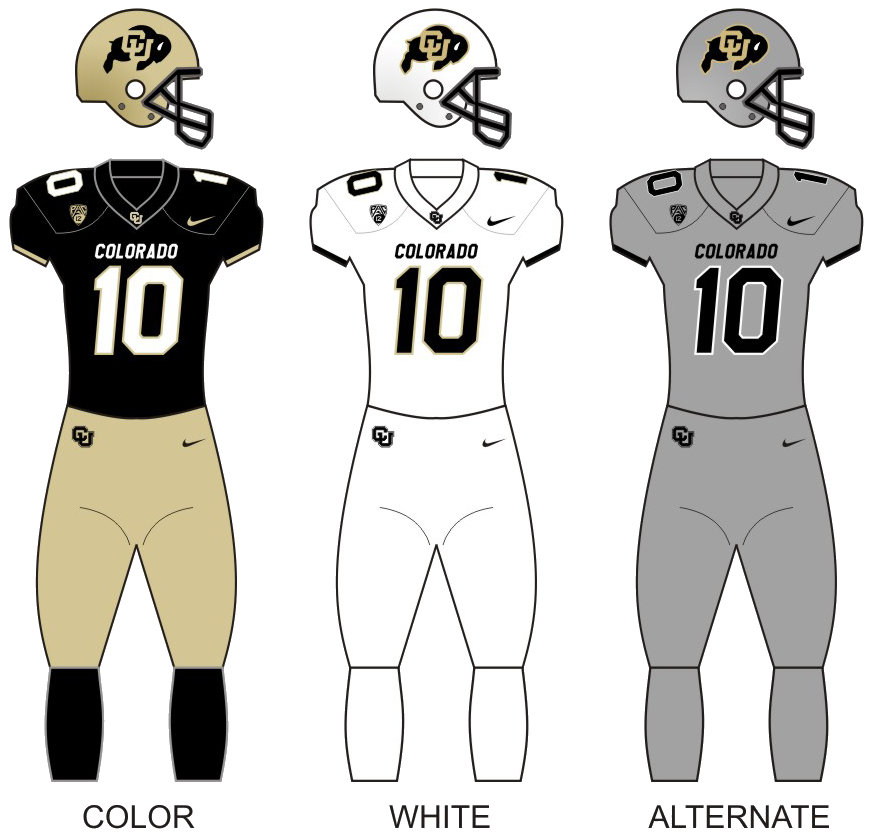

2018 Pac-12 Conference football standings
	Conf.			Overall
Team	W		L	W		L
North Division
No. 13 Washington xy$	7	–	2	10	–	4
No. 10 Washington State x	7	–	2	11	–	2
Stanford	6	–	3	9	–	4
Oregon	5	–	4	9	–	4
California	4	–	5	7	–	6
Oregon State	1	–	8	2	–	10
South Division
Utah xy	6	–	3	9	–	5
Arizona State	5	–	4	7	–	6
USC	4	–	5	5	–	7
Arizona	4	–	5	5	–	7
UCLA	3	–	6	3	–	9
Colorado	2	–	7	5	–	7
Championship: Washington 10, Utah 3
$ – Conference champion; x – Division champion/co-champions; y – Championship game participant; Rankings from AP Poll

The 2018 Colorado Buffaloes football team represented the University of Colorado in the Pac-12 Conference during the 2018 NCAA Division I FBS football season. Led by sixth-year head coach Mike MacIntyre, the Buffaloes played their home games on campus at Folsom Field in Boulder and finished at 5–7 (2–7 in Pac-12, last in South Division).

Despite a promising 5–0 start and a top twenty ranking, the Buffaloes lost their final seven games. The low point came during homecoming on October 27, when Colorado blew a 31–3 third-quarter lead to struggling Oregon State and lost by seven in overtime. MacIntyre was fired on November 18, the day after the sixth consecutive setback, a 30–7 home loss to rival Utah.

Mel Tucker, the defensive coordinator at Georgia, was hired as head coach in early December.

== Recruiting ==
=== Recruits ===
The Buffaloes signed a total of 21 recruits.

College recruiting information (2018)
Name	Hometown	School	Height	Weight	Commit date
Davion Taylor #3 OLB	Clarksdale, MS	Coahoma Community College	6 ft 1 in (1.85 m)	215 lb (98 kg)	Jun 22, 2017
Davion Taylor #3 OLB	Recruit ratings: Rivals: 247Sports: ESPN:				
Dylan Thomas #73 WR	Santa Fe Springs, CA	Santa Fe High School	6 ft 4 in (1.93 m)	180 lb (82 kg)	Jul 23, 2017
Dylan Thomas #73 WR	Recruit ratings: Rivals: 247Sports: ESPN:				
Blake Stenstrom #30 QB	Highlands Ranch, CO	Valor Christian High School	6 ft 4 in (1.93 m)	199 lb (90 kg)	Dec 17, 2016
Blake Stenstrom #30 QB	Recruit ratings: Rivals: 247Sports: ESPN:				
Delrick Abrams #5 CB	Angie, LA	Independence Community College	6 ft 2 in (1.88 m)	180 lb (82 kg)	Jul 15, 2017
Delrick Abrams #5 CB	Recruit ratings: Rivals: 247Sports: ESPN:				
Israel Antwine #41 DT	Oklahoma City, OK	Millwood High School	6 ft 3 in (1.91 m)	286 lb (130 kg)	Dec 19, 2017
Israel Antwine #41 DT	Recruit ratings: Rivals: 247Sports: ESPN:				
Dimitri Stanley #108 WR	Englewood, CO	Cherry Creek High School	5 ft 11 in (1.80 m)	180 lb (82 kg)	Jul 15, 2017
Dimitri Stanley #108 WR	Recruit ratings: Rivals: 247Sports: ESPN:				
Aaron Maddox #6 S	North Augusta, SC	Pima Community College	6 ft 0 in (1.83 m)	195 lb (88 kg)	Dec 11, 2017
Aaron Maddox #6 S	Recruit ratings: Rivals: 247Sports: ESPN:				
Joshka Gustav #67 DE	San Bernardino, CA	Aquinas High School	6 ft 3 in (1.91 m)	223 lb (101 kg)	Mar 24, 2017
Joshka Gustav #67 DE	Recruit ratings: Rivals: 247Sports: ESPN:				
Daniel Arias #156 WR	Mill Creek, WA	Henry M. Jackson High School	6 ft 3 in (1.91 m)	190 lb (86 kg)	Jul 3, 2017
Daniel Arias #156 WR	Recruit ratings: Rivals: 247Sports: ESPN:				
Darrion Jones #3 TE	Wilmington, CA	Los Angeles Harbor College	6 ft 5 in (1.96 m)	245 lb (111 kg)	Dec 11, 2017
Darrion Jones #3 TE	Recruit ratings: Rivals: 247Sports: ESPN:				
Jarek Broussard #165 WR	Dallas, TX	Bishop Lynch High School	5 ft 9 in (1.75 m)	174 lb (79 kg)	Jun 23, 2017
Jarek Broussard #165 WR	Recruit ratings: Rivals: 247Sports: ESPN:				
Lavon Wallace #55 S	Atwater, CA	Buhach High School	6 ft 2 in (1.88 m)	185 lb (84 kg)	Jul 29, 2017
Lavon Wallace #55 S	Recruit ratings: Rivals: 247Sports: ESPN:				
Clyde Moore #32 ILB	Newport Beach, CA	Corona Del Mar High School	6 ft 1 in (1.85 m)	225 lb (102 kg)	Jun 17, 2017
Clyde Moore #32 ILB	Recruit ratings: Rivals: 247Sports: ESPN:				
Deion Smith #56 RB	Houston, TX	Second Baptist School	5 ft 10 in (1.78 m)	169 lb (77 kg)	Jun 25, 2017
Deion Smith #56 RB	Recruit ratings: Rivals: 247Sports: ESPN:				
Tava Finau #101 DE	Burbank, CA	Burbank High School	6 ft 3 in (1.91 m)	250 lb (110 kg)	Sep 20, 2017
Tava Finau #101 DE	Recruit ratings: Rivals: 247Sports: ESPN:				
Frank Fillip #98 OT	Houston, TX	Clear Lake High School	6 ft 7 in (2.01 m)	263 lb (119 kg)	Jun 9, 2017
Frank Fillip #98 OT	Recruit ratings: Rivals: 247Sports: ESPN:				
Mustafa Johnson #23 DT	Modesto, CA	Modesto Junior College	6 ft 2 in (1.88 m)	285 lb (129 kg)	Dec 20, 2017
Mustafa Johnson #23 DT	Recruit ratings: Rivals: 247Sports: ESPN:				
Alex Tchangam #14 DE	Alpharetta, GA	De Anza College	6 ft 3 in (1.91 m)	250 lb (110 kg)	Feb 2, 2018
Alex Tchangam #14 DE	Recruit ratings: Rivals: 247Sports: ESPN:				
Hasaan Hypolite #82 S	Missouri City, TX	Hightower High School	6 ft 0 in (1.83 m)	190 lb (86 kg)	Feb 2, 2018
Hasaan Hypolite #82 S	Recruit ratings: Rivals: 247Sports: ESPN:				
Josh Jynes #94 OG	DeSoto, TX	DeSoto High School	6 ft 2 in (1.88 m)	312 lb (142 kg)	Apr 18, 2017
Josh Jynes #94 OG	Recruit ratings: Rivals: 247Sports: ESPN:				
Ray Robinson #89 S	Highlands Ranch, CO	Highlands Ranch High School	6 ft 1 in (1.85 m)	205 lb (93 kg)	Oct 23, 2016
Ray Robinson #89 S	Recruit ratings: Rivals: 247Sports: ESPN:				
Overall recruit ranking:
Note: In many cases, Scout, Rivals, 247Sports, On3, and ESPN may conflict in their listings of height and weight.; In these cases, the average was taken. ESPN grades are on a 100-point scale.; Sources: "Colorado Football Commitments". Rivals.; "2018 Team Ranking". Rivals.com.

== Preseason ==
=== Award watch lists ===
Listed in the order that they were released

Award	Player	Position	Year
Maxwell Award	Steven Montez	QB	JR
Lou Groza Award	James Stefanou	K	SO
Ray Guy Award	Alex Kinney	P	SR
Wuerffel Trophy	Nick Fisher	DB	SR
Walter Camp Award	Steven Montez	QB	JR
Ted Hendricks Award	Chris Mulumba	DE	SR
Earl Campbell Tyler Rose Award	Steven Montez	QB	JR
Johnny Unitas Golden Arm Award	Steven Montez	QB	JR

=== Pac-12 Media Days ===
The 2018 Pac-12 media days are set for July 25, 2018 in Hollywood, California. Mike MacIntyre (HC), Rick Gamboa (LB) & Steven Montez (QB) at Pac-12 Media Days. The Pac-12 media poll was released with the Buffaloes predicted to finish in fifth place at Pac-12 South division.

== Schedule ==
Date	Time	Opponent	Rank	Site	TV	Result	Attendance
August 31	7:30 p.m.	vs. Colorado State*		Broncos Stadium at Mile High; Denver, CO (Rocky Mountain Showdown)	CBSSN	W 45–13	70,158
September 8	1:30 p.m.	at Nebraska*		Memorial Stadium; Lincoln, NE (rivalry)	ABC	W 33–28	89,853
September 15	3:00 p.m.	New Hampshire*		Folsom Field; Boulder, CO	P12N	W 45–14	42,360
September 28	7:00 p.m.	UCLA		Folsom Field; Boulder, CO	FS1	W 38–16	46,814
October 6	2:00 p.m.	Arizona State	No. 21	Folsom Field; Boulder, CO	P12N	W 28–21	52,681
October 13	8:30 p.m.	at USC	No. 19	Los Angeles Memorial Coliseum; Los Angeles, CA	FS1	L 20–31	57,615
October 20	1:30 p.m.	at No. 15 Washington		Husky Stadium; Seattle, WA	FOX	L 13–27	68,798
October 27	1:00 p.m.	Oregon State^{†}		Folsom Field; Boulder, CO	P12N	L 34–41 ^{OT}	48,050
November 2	8:30 p.m.	at Arizona		Arizona Stadium; Tucson, AZ	FS1	L 34–42	43,080
November 10	1:30 p.m.	No. 10 Washington State		Folsom Field; Boulder, CO	ESPN	L 7–31	45,587
November 17	11:30 a.m.	No. 21 Utah		Folsom Field; Boulder, CO (Rumble in the Rockies)	P12N	L 7–30	39,360
November 24	5:00 p.m.	at California		California Memorial Stadium; Berkeley, CA	P12N	L 21–33	34,457
*Non-conference game; ^{†}Homecoming; Rankings from AP Poll released prior to the game; All times are in Mountain time

== Personnel ==
=== Coaching staff ===
Name	Title
Mike MacIntyre	Head coach
Darrin Chiaverini	Co-offensive coordinator/wide receivers coach/recruiting coordinator
D. J. Eliot	Defensive coordinator/outside linebackers Coach
Kurt Roper	Quarterbacks coach
Klayton Adams	Co-offensive coordinator/offensive line coach
Gary Bernardi	Tight ends & H-Backs coach
Shadon Brown	Secondary coach & Defensive Passing Game Coordinator
Ashley Ambrose	Cornerbacks coach
Ross Els	Inside linebackers/special teams coach
Darian Hagan	Running backs coach
Kwahn Drake	Defensive line coach
Chidera Uzo-Diribe	Graduate assistant

=== Roster ===
2018 Colorado Buffaloes football roster
Quarterback: 4 Sam Noyer – sophomore (6'4, 215); 7 Tyler Lytle – (redshirt) freshman (6'5, 205); 12 Steven Montez – junior (6'5, 230); 16 Blake Stenstrom – freshman (6'4, 220); Tailback: 1 Dovonan Lee – (redshirt) senior (5'9, 185); 8 Alex Fontenot – (redshirt) freshman (6'0, 195); 20 Deion Smith – freshman (6'0, 180); 21 Kyle Evans – senior (5'7, 175); 30 Andrew Wilk – sophomore (6'0, 205); 31 Noa Lukela – (redshirt) freshman (5'11, 200); 33 Chase Sanders – sophomore (6'0, 185); 34 Noa Lukela – freshman (5'11, 200); 34 Travon McMillian – (redshirt) senior (6'0, 210); 35 Beau Bisharat – junior (6'2, 220); Wide receiver: 2 Laviska Shenault – sophomore (6'1, 220); 3 K. D. Nixon – sophomore (5'8, 185); 5 Daniel Arias – freshman (6'4, 200); 6 Curtis Chiaverini – (redshirt) freshman (6'1, 195); 9 Juwann Winfree – senior (6'3, 210); 10 Jaylon Jackson – (redshirt) freshman (5'10, 180); 14 Jay MacIntyre – senior (5'10, 185); 15 Dimitri Stanley – freshman (5'11, 170); 18 Tony Brown – (redshirt) junior (6'1, 190); 23 Jarek Broussard – freshman (5'9, 180); 27 Dylan Thomas – freshman (6'2, 185); 83 Erik Lawson – junior (6'4, 205); Tight end: 38 Brady Russell – (redshirt) freshman (6'3, 250); 44 Chris Bounds – junior (6'4, 240); 80 Derek Coleman – junior (6'5, 235); 85 Jared Poplawski – sophomore (6'4, 230); 88 Darrion Jones – junior (6'6, 250)	Offensive line: 52 Joshua Jynes – freshman (6'2, 310); 54 Kanan Ray – freshman (6'4, 280); 55 Brett Tonz – junior (6'3, 295); 56 Tim Lynott – junior (6'3, 300); 58 Kary Kutsch – sophomore (6'4, 300); 59 Jacob Isen – (redshirt) freshman (6'2, 245); 60 Dillon Middlemiss – junior (6'5, 295); 61 Kolter Smith – sophomore (6'2, 285); 62 Justin Eggers – junior (6'5, 305); 64 Aaron Haigler – junior (6'7, 295); 65 Colby Pursell – (redshirt) freshman (6'4, 280); 66 Grant Polley – (redshirt) freshman (6'4, 250); 68 Casey Roddick – freshman (6'4, 340); 70 Jacob Moretti – (redshirt) freshman (6'4, 280); 71 Jack Shutack – junior (6'6, 285); 73 Isaac Miller – junior (6'7, 280); 74 Chance Lytle – (redshirt) freshman (6'7, 310); 75 Josh Kaiser – senior (6'5, 300); 77 Frank Fillip – freshman (6'7, 280); 77 Hunter Vaughn – sophomore (6'7, 300); 78 Will Sherman – (redshirt) freshman (6'3, 280); 79 Heston Paige – (redshirt) freshman (6'5, 175); Defensive line: 16 Chris Mulumba – senior (6'4, 275); 33 Javier Edwards – senior (6'3, 345); 34 Mustafa Johnson – freshman (6'2, 285); 56 Jase Franke – senior (6'3, 280); 72 Lyle Tuiloma – junior (6'3, 310); 90 Terriek Roberts - sophomore (6'6, 265); 95 Israel Antwine – freshman (6'4, 315); 96 Tava Finau – freshman (6'3, 260); 97 Mo Bandi – junior (6'5, 270); 98 Nico Magri – (redshirt) freshman (6'3, 270); 99 Jalen Sami – freshman (6'6, 320); 00 Joshka Gustav – freshman (6'3, 223); 00 Alex Tchangam – freshman (6'3, 250); Long snapper: 45 James Townsend – freshman (6'0, 220); 63 J. T. Bale – junior (6'2, 205); Placekicker: 48 James Stefanou – sophomore (6'1, 195); 49 Davis Price – junior (6'2, 195); Punter: 89 Alex Kinney – senior (6'1, 205); 92 Bailey Landwehr – senior (5'10, 170); 95 Sam Loy – junior (6'1, 190)	Inside linebacker: 30 Clyde Moore – freshman (6'1, 230); 31 Jonathan Van Diest – (redshirt) freshman (6'1, 230); 32 Rick Gamboa – senior (6'0, 240); 36 Akil Jones – sophomore (6'0, 220); 41 Devin Lynch – freshman (6'1, 210); 45 Jacob Stoltenberg – sophomore (6'0, 240); 50 Jake Yurachek – freshman (6'1, 235); 53 Nate Landman – sophomore (6'3, 220); 59 Colby Rieter – freshman (6'1, 225); Outside linebacker: 5 Davion Taylor – junior (6'3, 220); 13 Shamar Hamilton – (redshirt) junior (6'5, 220); 20 Drew Lewis – senior (6'2, 225); 40 Carson Wells – (redshirt) freshman (6'4, 240); 42 Nu'umotu Falo Jr. – (redshirt) junior (6'2 240); 44 Jacob Callier – sophomore (6'2 240); 46 Chase Newman – (redshirt) freshman (6'2 210); 47 Nick Edridge – (redshirt) freshman (6'3 215); 57 Sam Bennion – sophomore (6'5, 235); Defensive back: 1 Delrick Abrams – junior (6'3, 180); 2 Ronnie Blackman – sophomore (5'10, 180); 3 Derrion Rakestraw – sophomore (6'2, 190); 4 Dante Wigley – junior (6'1, 192); 6 Evan Washington – senior (6'2, 205); 7 Nick Fisher – senior (6'0, 190); 8 Trey Udoffia – sophomore (6'0, 185); 9 Aaron Maddox – sophomore (6'1, 175); 12 Hasaan Hypolite – freshman (5'11, 200); 14 Chris Miller – (redshirt) freshman (5'11, 185); 15 Darrell Hubbard – junior (6'1, 195); 21 Kyle Trego – senior (6'0, 195); 22 Lavon Wallace – freshman (6'4, 200); 23 Isaiah Lewis – (redshirt) freshman (6'0, 195); 25 Ray Robinson – freshman (6'1, 200); 26 Dustin Johnson – freshman (6'1, 195); 27 Kevin George – (redshirt) sophomore (6'3, 180); 28 Daniel Talley – senior (6'2, 215); 29 Uryan Hudson – sophomore (5'10, 175); 38 Brock Miller – freshman (6'0, 200); 39 Jaisen Sanchez – senior (6'1, 200); 49 Griffin Foulk – junior (6'1, 200); 54 Terrance Lang – (redshirt) freshman (6'7, 275)

== Game summaries ==
=== Vs. Colorado State ===
	1	2	3	4	Total
Buffaloes	21	7	17	0	45
Rams	7	3	0	3	13

=== At Nebraska ===
	1	2	3	4	Total
Buffaloes	14	3	10	6	33
Cornhuskers	7	14	7	0	28

=== New Hampshire ===
	1	2	3	4	Total
Wildcats	0	0	14	0	14
Buffaloes	7	21	10	7	45

=== UCLA ===
	1	2	3	4	Total
Bruins	10	3	3	0	16
Buffaloes	7	7	14	10	38

=== Arizona State ===
	1	2	3	4	Total
Sun Devils	7	7	7	0	21
No. 21 Buffaloes	7	7	14	0	28

=== At USC ===
	1	2	3	4	Total
No. 19 Buffaloes	0	7	0	13	20
Trojans	0	21	7	3	31

=== At Washington ===
	1	2	3	4	Total
Buffaloes	7	6	0	0	13
No. 15 Huskies	0	14	3	10	27

=== Oregon State ===
	1	2	3	4	OT	Total
Beavers	0	3	7	24	7	41
Buffaloes	7	17	7	3	0	34

=== At Arizona ===
	1	2	3	4	Total
Buffaloes	10	14	10	0	34
Wildcats	0	26	9	7	42

=== Washington State ===
	1	2	3	4	Total
No. 10 Cougars	0	10	7	14	31
Buffaloes	7	0	0	0	7

=== Utah ===
	1	2	3	4	Total
No. 21 Utes	0	7	17	6	30
Buffaloes	7	0	0	0	7

=== At California ===
	1	2	3	4	Total
Buffaloes	0	7	14	0	21
Golden Bears	21	3	3	6	33

== Rankings ==
Ranking movements Legend: ██ Increase in ranking ██ Decrease in ranking — = Not ranked RV = Received votes
	Week															
Poll	Pre	1	2	3	4	5	6	7	8	9	10	11	12	13	14	Final
AP	—	—	RV	RV	RV	21	19	RV	—	—	—	—	—	—	—	—
Coaches	—	—	RV	RV	RV	22	18	25	RV	—	—	—	—	—	—	—
CFP	Not released									—	—	—	—	—	—	Not released

== Players drafted into the NFL ==
Round	Pick	Player	Position	NFL Club
6	187	Juwann Winfree	WR	Denver Broncos
