= 2018 Pac-12 Football Championship Game =

- Conference Championship
Utah Utes	Washington Huskies
(9–3)	(9–3)
3	10
Head coach: Kyle Whittingham	Head coach: Chris Petersen
AP / Coaches / CFP; 17 / 17 / 17	AP / Coaches / CFP; 10 / 11 / 11
	1	2	3	4	Total
Utah	0	0	3	0	3
Washington	0	3	7	0	10
- Date: November 30, 2018
- Season: 2018
- Stadium: Levi's Stadium
- Location: Santa Clara, CA
- MVP: Byron Murphy, Washington
- Favorite: Washington by 4.5
- Referee: Chris Coyte
- Attendance: 35,134

United States TV coverage
- Network: Fox, ESPN Radio
- Announcers: Fox: Joe Davis (Play-By-Play); Brady Quinn (Analyst); Petros Papadakis (Analyst); Bruce Feldman (Sidelines) ESPN Radio: Bill Rosinski (Play-By-Play); David Norrie (Analyst); Ian Fitzsimmons (Sidelines)

2018 Pac-12 Conference football standings
	Conf.			Overall
Team	W		L	W		L
North Division
No. 13 Washington xy$	7	–	2	10	–	4
No. 10 Washington State x	7	–	2	11	–	2
Stanford	6	–	3	9	–	4
Oregon	5	–	4	9	–	4
California	4	–	5	7	–	6
Oregon State	1	–	8	2	–	10
South Division
Utah xy	6	–	3	9	–	5
Arizona State	5	–	4	7	–	6
USC	4	–	5	5	–	7
Arizona	4	–	5	5	–	7
UCLA	3	–	6	3	–	9
Colorado	2	–	7	5	–	7
Championship: Washington 10, Utah 3
$ – Conference champion; x – Division champion/co-champions; y – Championship game participant; Rankings from AP Poll

The 2018 Pac-12 Football Championship Game was played on November 30, 2018 at Levi's Stadium in Santa Clara, California to determine the champion of the Pac-12 Conference in football for the 2018 season. It was the eighth edition of the Pac-12 Football Championship Game and was televised nationally by Fox Sports. Washington defeated Utah 10–3 to win their second conference title in the Pac-12 era. The Huskies went on to represent the Pac-12 Conference in the 2019 Rose Bowl game.

== History ==
Washington played in its second Pac-12 Football Championship Game while Utah made its debut. With Utah's qualification, all six members of the South Division have now appeared in the Pac-12 championship.

The matchup was the 13th meeting between the Utes and the Huskies. They last played each other earlier in the season when Washington defeated Utah 21–7 at Rice–Eccles Stadium. Following that result, Washington led the all-time series 11–1.

== Teams ==
=== Utah ===
After starting 0–2 in conference play, Utah won six of their remaining seven conference games, officially clinching the South Division with a win against Colorado on November 17.

=== Washington ===
Washington claimed the North Division's berth in the championship game by winning their head-to-head matchup with Washington State in the 111th Apple Cup. The two rivals finished with 7–2 conference records.

== Game summary ==
=== Scoring summary ===
Scoring summary

Quarter	Time	Drive			Team	Scoring information	Score	
Quarter	Time	Plays	Yards	TOP	Team	Scoring information	UTAH	WASH
2	3:08	12	44	6:12	WASH	29-yard field goal by Peyton Henry	0	3
3	11:17	10	46	3:43	UTAH	53-yard field goal by Matt Gay	3	3
3	1:05				WASH	Interception returned 66 yards for touchdown by Byron Murphy, Peyton Henry kick good	3	10
"TOP" = time of possession. For other American football terms, see Glossary of American football.							3	10

=== Statistics ===
	1	2	3	4	Total
No. 17 Utes	0	0	3	0	3
No. 10 Huskies	0	3	7	0	10

Statistics	UTAH	WASH
First downs	12	19
Plays–yards	52–188	73–306
Rushes–yards	25–51	40–119
Passing yards	137	187
Passing: Comp–Att–Int	17–27–3	21–33–1
Time of possession	21:28	38:32

Team	Category	Player	Statistics
Utah	Passing	Jason Shelley	17/27, 137 yds, 3 INT
Utah	Rushing	Armand Shyne	11 car, 37 yds
Utah	Receiving	Jaylen Dixon	7 rec, 68 yds
Washington	Passing	Jake Browning	21/33, 187 yds, 1 INT
Washington	Rushing	Myles Gaskin	23 car, 71 yds
Washington	Receiving	Andre Baccellia	8 rec, 65 yds

== See also ==
- List of Pac-12 Conference football champions
- Stanford–USC football rivalry
