= Chase Hansen =

American football player (born 1993)

Profile
- Position: Linebacker

Personal information
- Born: May 20, 1993 (age 33); Provo, Utah, U.S.
- Listed height: 6 ft 3 in (1.91 m)
- Listed weight: 222 lb (101 kg)

Career information
- High school: Lone Peak (Highland, Utah)
- College: Utah (2012, 2015–2018)
- NFL draft: 2019: undrafted

Career history
- New Orleans Saints (2019–2022)

Awards and highlights
- First-team All-Pac-12 (2018)

Career NFL statistics
- Total tackles: 10
- Stats at Pro Football Reference

Chase Hansen (born May 20, 1993) is an American professional football linebacker. He played college football at Utah.

== Collegiate career ==
Hansen redshirted his true freshman season. He left the team after his freshman year to go on a LDS Mission to Brisbane, Australia. He returned before the 2015 season and played both quarterback and safety as a redshirt freshman. He played safety as a redshirt sophomore and moved to linebacker at the end of his redshirt junior year. As a senior, Hansen had 114 tackles, 22 tackles for a loss, and 5.0 sacks with two interceptions and was named first-team All-Pac-12 and a second-team All-American by the Football Writers Association of America and Sporting News.

== Professional career ==
Hansen was signed by the New Orleans Saints as an undrafted free agent on May 2, 2019. He was waived on May 10, but re-signed four days later. Hansen was placed on the Non-football Injury list in July and missed his rookie season due to a back injury.

Hansen made the Saints' initial roster out of training camp in 2020. He made his NFL debut on September 13, 2020, in the season opener against the Tampa Bay Buccaneers. He was placed on injured reserve on October 3, 2020. He was activated on November 13, 2020. Hansen was then waived on November 24, 2020, and re-signed to the practice squad two days later. He was elevated to the active roster on January 2, 2021, for the team's week 17 game against the Carolina Panthers, and reverted to the practice squad after the game. He was elevated again on January 9 and January 16 for the wild card and divisional playoff games against the Chicago Bears and Tampa Bay Buccaneers, and reverted to the practice squad again after each game. On January 18, 2021, Hansen signed a reserve/futures contract with the Saints.

On September 18, 2021, Hansen was placed on injured reserve. He was activated on November 8, then released the next day. He was signed to the practice squad on November 13.

On August 8, 2022, Hansen was brought back by the New Orleans Saints. He was waived on August 30, 2022, and signed to the practice squad the next day. He was elevated to the active roster on September 6, 2022. He was placed on injured reserve on November 7. He was designated to return from injured reserve on December 14, 2022, and activated for Week 15. Hansen did not receive a qualifying offer from the Saints following the season and became a free agent on March 15, 2023.
