= 2018 NCAA Division I FBS football rankings =

- Season: 2018
- Bowl season: 2018–19 bowl games
- Preseason No. 1: Alabama
- End of season champions: Clemson
- Conference with most teams in final AP poll: SEC (6)

Two human polls and a committee's selections comprised the 2018 National Collegiate Athletic Association (NCAA) Division I Football Bowl Subdivision (FBS) football rankings, in addition to various publications' preseason polls. Unlike most sports, college football's governing body, the NCAA, does not bestow a national championship, instead that title is bestowed by one or more different polling agencies. There are two main weekly polls that begin in the preseason—the AP Poll and the Coaches Poll. One additional poll, the College Football Playoff (CFP) ranking, is released midway through the season after the ninth week. The CFP rankings determine who makes the four-team playoff which determines the College Football Playoff National Champion.

== Legend ==
	Increase in ranking
	Decrease in ranking
	Not ranked previous week
	Selected for College Football Playoff
(#–#)	Win–loss record
(Italics)	Number of first place votes
т	Tied with team above or below also with this symbol

== AP Poll ==
	Preseason Aug 20	Week 1 Sep 4	Week 2 Sep 9	Week 3 Sep 16	Week 4 Sep 23	Week 5 Sep 30	Week 6 Oct 7	Week 7 Oct 14	Week 8 Oct 21	Week 9 Oct 28	Week 10 Nov 4	Week 11 Nov 11	Week 12 Nov 18	Week 13 Nov 25	Week 14 Dec 2	Week 15 (Final) Jan 8	
1.	Alabama (42)	Alabama (1–0) (48)	Alabama (2–0) (54)	Alabama (3–0) (58)	Alabama (4–0) (60)	Alabama (5–0) (58)	Alabama (6–0) (59)	Alabama (7–0) (60)	Alabama (8–0) (61)	Alabama (8–0) (60)	Alabama (9–0) (60)	Alabama (10–0) (61)	Alabama (11–0) (61)	Alabama (12–0) (61)	Alabama (13–0) (61)	Clemson (15–0) (61)	1.
2.	Clemson (18)	Clemson (1–0) (12)	Clemson (2–0) (6)	Georgia (3–0)	Georgia (4–0)	Georgia (5–0)	Georgia (6–0)	Ohio State (7–0) (1)	Clemson (7–0)	Clemson (8–0)	Clemson (9–0)	Clemson (10–0)	Clemson (11–0)	Clemson (12–0)	Clemson (13–0)	Alabama (14–1)	2.
3.	Georgia	Georgia (1–0)	Georgia (2–0)	Clemson (3–0) (2)	Clemson (4–0) (1)	Ohio State (5–0) (1)	Ohio State (6–0) (1)	Clemson (6–0)	Notre Dame (7–0)	Notre Dame (8–0)	Notre Dame (9–0)	Notre Dame (10–0)	Notre Dame (11–0)	Notre Dame (12–0)	Notre Dame (12–0)	Ohio State (13–1)	3.
4.	Wisconsin (1)	Ohio State (1–0)	Ohio State (2–0)	Ohio State (3–0)	Ohio State (4–0)	Clemson (5–0) (1)	Clemson (6–0) (1)	Notre Dame (7–0)	LSU (7–1)	LSU (7–1)	Michigan (8–1)	Michigan (9–1)	Michigan (10–1)	Georgia (11–1)	Oklahoma (12–1)	Oklahoma (12–2)	4.
5.	Ohio State	Wisconsin (1–0) (1)	Oklahoma (2–0)	Oklahoma (3–0)	LSU (4–0)	LSU (5–0)	Notre Dame (6–0)	LSU (6–1)	Michigan (7–1)	Michigan (7–1)	Georgia (8–1)	Georgia (9–1)	Georgia (10–1)	Oklahoma (11–1)	Ohio State (12–1)	Notre Dame (12–1)	5.
6.	Washington	Oklahoma (1–0)	Wisconsin (2–0) (1)	LSU (3–0)	Oklahoma (4–0)	Notre Dame (5–0)	West Virginia (5–0)	Michigan (6–1)	Texas (6–1)	Georgia (7–1)	Oklahoma (8–1)	Oklahoma (9–1)	Oklahoma (10–1)	Ohio State (11–1)	Georgia (11–2)	LSU (10–3)	6.
7.	Oklahoma	Auburn (1–0)	Auburn (2–0)	Stanford (3–0)	Stanford (4–0)	Oklahoma (5–0)	Washington (5–1)	Texas (6–1)	Georgia (6–1)	Oklahoma (7–1)	West Virginia (7–1)	West Virginia (8–1)	Washington State (10–1)	UCF (11–0)	UCF (12–0)	Georgia (11–3) т	7.
8.	Miami (FL)	Notre Dame (1–0)	Notre Dame (2–0)	Notre Dame (3–0)	Notre Dame (4–0)	Auburn (4–1)	Penn State (4–1)	Georgia (6–1)	Oklahoma (6–1)	Ohio State (7–1)	Ohio State (8–1)	Washington State (9–1)	UCF (10–0) т	Michigan (10–2)	Michigan (10–2)	Florida (10–3) т	8.
9.	Auburn	Washington (0–1)	Stanford (2–0)	Auburn (2–1)	Penn State (4–0)	West Virginia (4–0)	Texas (5–1)	Oklahoma (5–1)	Florida (6–1)	UCF (7–0)	LSU (7–2)	Ohio State (9–1)	LSU (9–2) т	Texas (9–3)	Washington (10–3)	Texas (10–4)	9.
10.	Penn State	Stanford (1–0)	Washington (1–1)	Washington (2–1) т	Auburn (3–1)	Washington (4–1)	UCF (5–0)	UCF (6–0)	UCF (7–0)	Washington State (7–1)	Washington State (8–1)	LSU (8–2)	Ohio State (10–1)	Washington (9–3)	Florida (9–3)	Washington State (11–2)	10.
11.	Michigan State	LSU (1–0)	Penn State (2–0)	Penn State (3–0) т	Washington (3–1)	Penn State (4–1)	Oklahoma (5–1)	Florida (6–1)	Ohio State (7–1)	Kentucky (7–1)	UCF (8–0)	UCF (9–0)	Texas (8–3)	Florida (9–3)	LSU (9–3)	UCF (12–1)	11.
12.	Notre Dame	Virginia Tech (1–0)	LSU (2–0)	West Virginia (2–0)	West Virginia (3–0)	UCF (4–0)	Michigan (5–1)	Oregon (5–1)	Kentucky (6–1)	West Virginia (6–1)	Kentucky (7–2)	Syracuse (8–2)	West Virginia (8–2)	Washington State (10–2) т	Washington State (10–2)	Kentucky (10–3)	12.
13.	Stanford	Penn State (1–0)	Virginia Tech (2–0)	Virginia Tech (2–0)	UCF (3–0)	Kentucky (5–0)	LSU (5–1)	West Virginia (5–1)	West Virginia (5–1)	Florida (6–2)	Syracuse (7–2)	Texas (7–3)	Florida (8–3)	LSU (9–3) т	Penn State (9–3)	Washington (10–4)	13.
14.	Michigan	West Virginia (1–0)	West Virginia (2–0)	Mississippi State (3–0)	Michigan (3–1)	Stanford (4–1)	Florida (5–1)	Kentucky (5–1)	Washington State (6–1)	Penn State (6–2)	Utah State (8–1)	Utah State (9–1)	Utah State (10–1)	Penn State (9–3)	Texas (9–4)	Michigan (10–3)	14.
15.	USC	Michigan State (1–0)	TCU (2–0)	Oklahoma State (3–0)	Wisconsin (3–1)	Michigan (4–1)	Wisconsin (4–1)	Washington (5–2)	Washington (6–2)	Texas (6–2)	Texas (6–3)	Florida (7–3)	Penn State (8–3)	West Virginia (8–3)	West Virginia (8–3)	Syracuse (10–3)	15.
16.	TCU	TCU (1–0)	Mississippi State (2–0)	UCF (2–0)	Miami (FL) (3–1)	Wisconsin (3–1)	Miami (FL) (5–1)	NC State (5–0)	Texas A&M (5–2)	Utah (6–2)	Fresno State (8–1)	Penn State (7–3)	Washington (8–3)	Kentucky (9–3)	Kentucky (9–3)	Texas A&M (9–4)	16.
17.	West Virginia	USC (1–0)	Boise State (2–0)	TCU (2–1)	Kentucky (4–0)	Miami (FL) (4–1)	Oregon (4–1)	Texas A&M (5–2)	Penn State (5–2)	Houston (7–1)	Boston College (7–2)	Washington (7–3)	Kentucky (8–3)	Utah (9–3)	Syracuse (9–3)	Penn State (9–4)	17.
18.	Mississippi State	Mississippi State (1–0)	UCF (2–0)	Wisconsin (2–1)	Texas (3–1)	Oregon (4–1)	Kentucky (5–1)	Penn State (4–2)	Iowa (6–1)	Utah State (7–1)	Mississippi State (6–3)	Iowa State (6–3)	Utah (8–3)	Syracuse (9–3)	Mississippi State (8–4)	Fresno State (12–2)	18.
19.	Florida State	UCF (1–0)	Michigan (1–1)	Michigan (2–1)	Oregon (3–1)	Texas (4–1)	Colorado (5–0)	Iowa (5–1)	Oregon (5–2)	Iowa (6–2)	Florida (6–3)	Cincinnati (9–1)	Syracuse (8–3)	Boise State (10–2)	Fresno State (11–2)	Army (11–2)	19.
20.	Virginia Tech	Boise State (1–0)	Oregon (2–0)	Oregon (3–0)	BYU (3–1)	Michigan State (3–1)	NC State (5–0)	Cincinnati (6–0)	Wisconsin (5–2)	Fresno State (7–1)	Washington (7–3)	Kentucky (7–3)	Northwestern (7–4)	Mississippi State (8–4)	Utah (9–4)	West Virginia (8–4)	20.
21.	UCF	Michigan (0–1)	Miami (FL) (1–1)	Miami (FL) (2–1)	Michigan State (2–1)	Colorado (4–0)	Auburn (4–2)	South Florida (6–0)	South Florida (7–0)	Mississippi State (5–3)	Penn State (6–3)	Utah (7–3)	Boise State (9–2)	Northwestern (8–4)	Texas A&M (8–4)	Northwestern (9–5)	21.
22.	Boise State	Miami (FL) (0–1)	USC (1–1)	Texas A&M (2–1)	Duke (4–0)	Florida (4–1)	Texas A&M (4–2)	Mississippi State (4–2)	NC State (5–1)	Syracuse (6–2)	NC State (6–2)	Boston College (7–3)	Mississippi State (7–4)	Texas A&M (8–4)	Army (9–2)	Utah State (11–2)	22.
23.	Texas	Oregon (1–0)	Arizona State (2–0)	Boston College (3–0)	Mississippi State (3–1)	NC State (4–0)	South Florida (5–0)	Wisconsin (4–2)	Utah (5–2)	Virginia (6–2)	Iowa State (5–3)	Boise State (8–2)	Army (9–2)	Army (9–2)	Boise State (10–3)	Boise State (10–3)	23.
24.	Oregon	South Carolina (1–0)	Oklahoma State (2–0)	Michigan State (1–1)	California (3–0)	Virginia Tech (3–1)	Mississippi State (4–2)	Michigan State (4–2)	Stanford (5–2)	Boston College (6–2)	Michigan State (6–3)	Northwestern (6–4)	Pittsburgh (7–4)	Iowa State (7–4)	Missouri (8–4)	Cincinnati (11–2)	24.
25.	LSU	Florida (1–0)	Michigan State (1–1)	BYU (2–1)	Texas Tech (3–1)	Oklahoma State (4–1)	Cincinnati (6–0)	Washington State (5–1)	Appalachian State (5–1)	Texas A&M (5–3)	Cincinnati (8–1)	Mississippi State (6–4)	Iowa State (6–4)	Fresno State (10–2)	Iowa State (8–4)	Iowa (9–4)	25.
	Preseason Aug 20	Week 1 Sep 4	Week 2 Sep 9	Week 3 Sep 16	Week 4 Sep 23	Week 5 Sep 30	Week 6 Oct 7	Week 7 Oct 14	Week 8 Oct 21	Week 9 Oct 28	Week 10 Nov 4	Week 11 Nov 11	Week 12 Nov 18	Week 13 Nov 25	Week 14 Dec 2	Week 15 (Final) Jan 8	
		Dropped: Florida State; Texas	Dropped: South Carolina; Florida	Dropped: Boise State; USC; Arizona State	Dropped: Virginia Tech; Oklahoma State; TCU; Texas A&M; Boston College	Dropped: BYU; Duke; Mississippi State; California; Texas Tech	Dropped: Stanford; Michigan State; Virginia Tech; Oklahoma State	Dropped: Miami (FL); Colorado; Auburn	Dropped: Cincinnati; Mississippi State; Michigan State	Dropped: Washington; Oregon; Wisconsin; South Florida; NC State; Stanford; Appalachian State	Dropped: Utah; Houston; Iowa; Virginia; Texas A&M	Dropped: Fresno State; NC State; Michigan State	Dropped: Cincinnati; Boston College	Dropped: Utah State; Pittsburgh	Dropped: Northwestern	Dropped: Mississippi State; Utah; Missouri; Iowa State	

== Coaches Poll ==
	Preseason Aug 2	Week 1 Sep 4	Week 2 Sep 9	Week 3 Sep 16	Week 4 Sep 23	Week 5 Sep 30	Week 6 Oct 7	Week 7 Oct 14	Week 8 Oct 21	Week 9 Oct 28	Week 10 Nov 4	Week 11 Nov 11	Week 12 Nov 18	Week 13 Nov 25	Week 14 Dec 2	Week 15 (Final) Jan 8	
1.	Alabama (61)	Alabama (1–0) (59)	Alabama (2–0) (59)	Alabama (3–0) (60)	Alabama (4–0) (61)	Alabama (5–0) (61)	Alabama (6–0) (61)	Alabama (7–0) (61)	Alabama (8–0) (60)	Alabama (8–0) (62)	Alabama (9–0) (63)	Alabama (10–0) (64)	Alabama (11–0) (63)	Alabama (12–0) (63)	Alabama (13–0) (62)	Clemson (15–0) (64)	1.
2.	Clemson (3)	Clemson (1–0) (3)	Clemson (2–0) (3)	Clemson (3–0) (2)	Clemson (4–0) (2)	Georgia (5–0)	Georgia (6–0)	Ohio State (7–0) (1)	Clemson (7–0) (2)	Clemson (8–0) (2)	Clemson (9–0) (1)	Clemson (10–0) (1)	Clemson (11–0) (1)	Clemson (12–0) (1)	Clemson (13–0) (2)	Alabama (14–1)	2.
3.	Ohio State (1)	Georgia (1–0)	Georgia (2–0)	Georgia (3–0)	Georgia (4–0)	Ohio State (5–0) (1)	Ohio State (6–0) (1)	Clemson (6–0) (2)	Notre Dame (7–0)	Notre Dame (8–0)	Notre Dame (9–0)	Notre Dame (10–0)	Notre Dame (11–0)	Notre Dame (12–0)	Notre Dame (12–0)	Ohio State (13–1)	3.
4.	Georgia	Ohio State (1–0) (1)	Ohio State (2–0) (1)	Ohio State (3–0) (1)	Ohio State (4–0) (1)	Clemson (5–0) (2)	Clemson (6–0) (2)	Notre Dame (7–0)	LSU (7–1)	LSU (7–1)	Michigan (8–1)	Michigan (9–1)	Michigan (10–1)	Georgia (11–1)	Oklahoma (12–1)	Oklahoma (12–2)	4.
5.	Oklahoma	Oklahoma (1–0)	Oklahoma (2–0)	Oklahoma (3–0)	Oklahoma (4–0)	Oklahoma (5–0)	Notre Dame (6–0)	LSU (6–1)	Michigan (7–1)	Michigan (7–1) т	Georgia (8–1)	Georgia (9–1)	Georgia (10–1)	Oklahoma (11–1)	Ohio State (12–1)	Notre Dame (12–1)	5.
6.	Washington	Wisconsin (1–0)	Wisconsin (2–0)	LSU (3–0)	LSU (4–0)	LSU (5–0)	West Virginia (5–0)	Georgia (6–1)	Georgia (6–1)	Georgia (7–1) т	Oklahoma (8–1)	Oklahoma (9–1)	Oklahoma (10–1)	Ohio State (11–1)	Georgia (11–2)	Florida (10–3)	6.
7.	Wisconsin	Auburn (1–0)	Auburn (2–0)	Stanford (3–0)	Stanford (4–0)	Notre Dame (5–0)	Washington (5–1)	Michigan (6–1)	Texas (6–1)	Oklahoma (7–1)	Ohio State (8–1)	West Virginia (8–1)	Washington State (10–1)	UCF (11–0)	UCF (12–0)	LSU (10–3)	7.
8.	Miami (FL)	Notre Dame (1–0)	Notre Dame (2–0)	Notre Dame (3–0)	Notre Dame (4–0)	West Virginia (4–0)	Penn State (4–1)	Texas (6–1)	Oklahoma (6–1)	Ohio State (7–1)	West Virginia (7–1)	Ohio State (9–1)	LSU (9–2)	Michigan (10–2)	Michigan (10–2)	Georgia (11–3)	8.
9.	Penn State	Stanford (1–0)	Stanford (2–0)	Penn State (3–0)	Penn State (4–0)	Auburn (4–1)	UCF (5–0)	UCF (6–0)	Ohio State (7–1)	UCF (7–0)	Washington State (8–1)	Washington State (9–1)	UCF (10–0)	Texas (9–3)	Washington (10–3)	Texas (10–4)	9.
10.	Auburn	Penn State (1–0)	Penn State (2–0)	Virginia Tech (2–0)	Auburn (3–1)	Washington (4–1)	Wisconsin (4–1)	Oklahoma (5–1)	UCF (7–0)	West Virginia (6–1)	LSU (7–2)	LSU (8–2)	Ohio State (10–1)	Florida (9–3)	Florida (9–3)	Washington State (11–2)	10.
11.	Notre Dame	Washington (0–1)	Virginia Tech (2–0)	Auburn (2–1)	Washington (3–1)	Penn State (4–1)	Oklahoma (5–1)	Oregon (5–1)	Florida (6–1)	Washington State (7–1)	UCF (8–0)	UCF (9–0)	Texas (8–3)	Washington (9–3)	LSU (9–3)	Kentucky (10–3)	11.
12.	Michigan State	USC (1–0)	Washington (1–1)	Washington (2–1)	West Virginia (3–0)	Wisconsin (3–1)	LSU (5–1)	Florida (6–1)	West Virginia (6–1)	Kentucky (7–1)	Kentucky (7–2)	Syracuse (8–2)	West Virginia (8–2)	Penn State (9–3)	Penn State (9–3)	UCF (12–1)	12.
13.	Stanford	Michigan State (1–0)	LSU (2–0)	West Virginia (2–0)	Wisconsin (3–1)	UCF (4–0)	Michigan (5–1)	West Virginia (5–1)	Washington (6–2)	Penn State (6–2)	Syracuse (7–2)	Utah State (9–1)	Florida (8–3)	Washington State (10–2)	Washington State (10–2)	Washington (10–4)	13.
14.	Michigan	Virginia Tech (1–0)	TCU (2–0)	Mississippi State (3–0)	UCF (4–0)	Stanford (4–1)	Texas (5–1)	Washington (5–2)	Kentucky (6–1)	Florida (6–2)	Boston College (7–2)	Texas (7–3)	Penn State (8–3)	LSU (9–3)	Texas (9–3)	Michigan (10–3)	14.
15.	USC	LSU (1–0)	West Virginia (2–0)	Oklahoma State (3–0)	Michigan (3–1)	Kentucky (5–0)	Miami (FL) (5–1)	NC State (5–0)	Washington State (6–1)	Texas (6–2)	Mississippi State (6–3)	Penn State (7–3)	Utah State (10–1)	Kentucky (9–3)	Kentucky (9–3)	Syracuse (10–3)	15.
16.	TCU	TCU (1–0)	Mississippi State (2–0)	Wisconsin (2–1)	Miami (FL) (3–1)	Michigan (4–1)	Florida (5–1)	Penn State (4–2)	Penn State (5–2)	Utah (6–2)	Utah State (8–1)	Florida (7–3)	Washington (8–3)	West Virginia (8–3)	West Virginia (8–3)	Texas A&M (9–4)	16.
17.	Virginia Tech	West Virginia (1–0)	Boise State (2–0)	TCU (2–1)	Kentucky (4–0)	Miami (FL) (4–1)	Oregon (4–1)	Kentucky (5–1)	Texas A&M (5–2)	Houston (7–1)	Fresno State (8–1)	Washington (7–3)	Utah (8–3)	Utah (9–3)	Syracuse (9–3)	Penn State (9–4)	17.
18.	Mississippi State	Mississippi State (1–0)	UCF (2–0)	UCF (2–0)	Michigan State (2–1)	Oregon (4–1)	Colorado (5–0)	Texas A&M (5–2)	Iowa (6–1)	Iowa (6–2)	Washington (7–3)	Iowa State (6–3)	Kentucky (8–3)	Syracuse (9–3)	Mississippi State (8–4)	Fresno State (12–2)	18.
19.	Florida State	Boise State (1–0)	Oklahoma State (2–0)	Oregon (3–0)	Mississippi State (3–1)	Michigan State (3–1)	NC State (5–0)	Wisconsin (4–2)	Wisconsin (5–2)	Washington (6–3)	Texas (6–3)	Utah (7–3)	Syracuse (8–3)	Mississippi State (8–4)	Utah (9–4)	Northwestern (9–5)	19.
20.	West Virginia	UCF (1–0)	Miami (FL) (1–1)	Miami (FL) (2–1)	Oregon (3–1)	Texas (4–1)	Kentucky (5–1)	South Florida (6–0)	South Florida (7–0)	Utah State (7–1)	Penn State (6–3)	Cincinnati (9–1)	Mississippi State (7–4)	Boise State (10–2)	Texas A&M (8–4)	Army (11–2)	20.
21.	Texas	Miami (FL) (0–1)	USC (1–1)	Michigan (2–1)	Oklahoma State (3–1)	Oklahoma State (4–1)	Auburn (4–2)	Cincinnati (6–0)	Oregon (5–2)	Mississippi State (5–3)	Florida (6–3)	Kentucky (7–3)	Northwestern (7–4)	Northwestern (8–4)	Fresno State (11–2)	Utah State (11–2)	21.
22.	Boise State	Michigan (0–1)	Michigan (1–1)	Texas A&M (2–1)	Texas (3–1)	Colorado (4–0)	Texas A&M (4–2)	Iowa (5–1)	NC State (5–1)	Virginia (6–2)	NC State (6–2)	Boston College (7–3)	Boise State (9–2)	Texas A&M (8–4)	Northwestern (8–5)	West Virginia (8–4)	22.
23.	UCF	Oklahoma State (1–0)	Oregon (2–0)	Michigan State (1–1)	Duke (4–0)	Virginia Tech (3–1)	South Florida (5–0)	Washington State (5–1)	Stanford (5–2)	Fresno State (7–1)	Cincinnati (8–1)	Mississippi State (6–4)	Fresno State (9–2)	Fresno State (10–2)	Utah State (10–2)	Cincinnati (11–2)	23.
24.	LSU	South Carolina (1–0)	Michigan State (1–1)	Boise State (2–1)	Virginia Tech (3–1)	Boise State (3–1)	Stanford (4–2)	Stanford (4–2)	Utah (5–2)	Syracuse (6–2)	Utah (6–3)	Boise State (8–2)	Army (9–2)	Utah State (10–2)	Boise State (10–3)	Boise State (10–3)	24.
25.	Oklahoma State	Florida (1–0)	Arizona State (2–0)	Boston College (3–0)	Boise State (2–1)	NC State (4–0)	Cincinnati (6–0)	Colorado (5–1)	Miami (FL) (5–2)	Boston College (6–2)	Iowa State (5–3)	UAB (9–1)	Pittsburgh (7–4)	Army (9–2)	Army (9–2)	Mississippi State (8–5)	25.
	Preseason Aug 2	Week 1 Sep 4	Week 2 Sep 9	Week 3 Sep 16	Week 4 Sep 23	Week 5 Sep 30	Week 6 Oct 7	Week 7 Oct 14	Week 8 Oct 21	Week 9 Oct 28	Week 10 Nov 4	Week 11 Nov 11	Week 12 Nov 18	Week 13 Nov 25	Week 14 Dec 2	Week 15 (Final) Jan 8	
		Dropped: Florida State; Texas	Dropped: Florida; South Carolina	Dropped: Arizona State; USC	Dropped: TCU; Texas A&M; Boston College	Dropped: Mississippi State; Duke	Dropped: Michigan State; Oklahoma State; Virginia Tech; Boise State	Dropped: Miami (FL); Auburn	Dropped: Cincinnati; Colorado	Dropped: Texas A&M; Wisconsin; South Florida; Oregon; NC State; Stanford; Miami (FL)	Dropped: Houston; Iowa; Virginia	Dropped: Fresno State; NC State	Dropped: Iowa State; Cincinnati; Boston College; UAB	Dropped: Pittsburgh	None	Dropped: Utah	

== CFP rankings ==
	Week 9 Oct 30	Week 10 Nov 6	Week 11 Nov 13	Week 12 Nov 20	Week 13 Nov 27	Week 14 (Final) Dec 2	
1.	Alabama (8–0)	Alabama (9–0)	Alabama (10–0)	Alabama (11–0)	Alabama (12–0)	Alabama (13–0)	1.
2.	Clemson (8–0)	Clemson (9–0)	Clemson (10–0)	Clemson (11–0)	Clemson (12–0)	Clemson (13–0)	2.
3.	LSU (7–1)	Notre Dame (9–0)	Notre Dame (10–0)	Notre Dame (11–0)	Notre Dame (12–0)	Notre Dame (12–0)	3.
4.	Notre Dame (8–0)	Michigan (8–1)	Michigan (9–1)	Michigan (10–1)	Georgia (11–1)	Oklahoma (12–1)	4.
5.	Michigan (7–1)	Georgia (8–1)	Georgia (9–1)	Georgia (10–1)	Oklahoma (11–1)	Georgia (11–2)	5.
6.	Georgia (7–1)	Oklahoma (8–1)	Oklahoma (9–1)	Oklahoma (10–1)	Ohio State (11–1)	Ohio State (12–1)	6.
7.	Oklahoma (7–1)	LSU (7–2)	LSU (8–2)	LSU (9–2)	Michigan (10–2)	Michigan (10–2)	7.
8.	Washington State (7–1)	Washington State (8–1)	Washington State (9–1)	Washington State (10–1)	UCF (11–0)	UCF (12–0)	8.
9.	Kentucky (7–1)	West Virginia (7–1)	West Virginia (9–1)	UCF (10–0)	Florida (9–3)	Washington (10–3)	9.
10.	Ohio State (7–1)	Ohio State (8–1)	Ohio State (9–1)	Ohio State (10–1)	LSU (9–3)	Florida (9–3)	10.
11.	Florida (6–2)	Kentucky (7–2)	UCF (9–0)	Florida (8–3)	Washington (9–3)	LSU (9–3)	11.
12.	UCF (7–0)	UCF (8–0)	Syracuse (8–2)	Penn State (8–3)	Penn State (9–3)	Penn State (9–3)	12.
13.	West Virginia (6–1)	Syracuse (7–2)	Florida (7–3)	West Virginia (8–2)	Washington State (10–2)	Washington State (10–2)	13.
14.	Penn State (6–2)	NC State (6–2)	Penn State (7–3)	Texas (8–3)	Texas (9–3)	Kentucky (9–3)	14.
15.	Utah (6–2)	Florida (6–3)	Texas (7–3)	Kentucky (8–3)	Kentucky (9–3)	Texas (9–4)	15.
16.	Iowa (6–2)	Mississippi State (6–3)	Iowa State (6–3)	Washington (8–3)	West Virginia (8–3)	West Virginia (8–3)	16.
17.	Texas (6–2)	Boston College (7–2)	Kentucky (7–3)	Utah (8–3)	Utah (9–3)	Utah (9–4)	17.
18.	Mississippi State (5–3)	Michigan State (6–3)	Washington (7–3)	Mississippi State (7–4)	Mississippi State (8–4)	Mississippi State (8–4)	18.
19.	Syracuse (6–2)	Texas (6–3)	Utah (7–3)	Northwestern (7–4)	Texas A&M (8–4)	Texas A&M (8–4)	19.
20.	Texas A&M (5–3)	Penn State (6–3)	Boston College (7–3)	Syracuse (8–3)	Syracuse (9–3)	Syracuse (9–3)	20.
21.	NC State (5–2)	Iowa (6–3)	Mississippi State (6–4)	Utah State (10–1)	Northwestern (8–4)	Fresno State (11–2)	21.
22.	Boston College (6–2)	Iowa State (5–3)	Northwestern (6–4)	Texas A&M (7–4)	Boise State (10–2)	Northwestern (8–5)	22.
23.	Fresno State (7–1)	Fresno State (8–1)	Utah State (9–1)	Boise State (9–2)	Iowa State (7–4)	Missouri (8–4)	23.
24.	Iowa State (4–3)	Auburn (6–3)	Cincinnati (9–1)	Pittsburgh (7–4)	Missouri (8–4)	Iowa State (8–4)	24.
25.	Virginia (6–2)	Washington (7–3)	Boise State (8–2)	Iowa State (6–4)	Fresno State (10–2)	Boise State (10–3)	25.
	Week 9 Oct 30	Week 10 Nov 6	Week 11 Nov 13	Week 12 Nov 20	Week 13 Nov 27	Week 14 (Final) Dec 2	
		Dropped: Utah; Texas A&M; Virginia	Dropped: NC State; Michigan State; Iowa; Fresno State; Auburn	Dropped: Boston College; Cincinnati	Dropped: Utah State; Pittsburgh	None	
