= Pac-12 Football Championship Game =

Annual college football game

Pac-12 Conference Football Championship Game
- Sport: Football
- Conference: Pac-12 Conference
- Played: 2011–2023, 2026–present
- Last contest: 2023
- Current champion: Washington
- Most championships: Oregon (4)
- TV partners: Fox (2011, even years until 2022); ESPN/ABC (odd years until 2023); CBS (starting in 2026)

Sponsors
- 76 (2016–2023)

Host stadiums
- On-Campus Sites (2011–2013, 2020, 2026–present); Levi's Stadium (2014–2019) Allegiant Stadium (2021–2023)

Host locations
- Eugene, Oregon (2011); Stanford, California (2012); Tempe, Arizona (2013); Santa Clara, California (2014–2019); Los Angeles, California (2020); Paradise, Nevada (2021–2023); Boise, Idaho (2026)

The Pac-12 Football Championship Game is a college football game held by the Pac-12 Conference to determine the season's conference champion, initially played from 2011 through 2023. The game from the 2011–2021 seasons had the champion of the North Division against the champion of the South Division. The inaugural game was held during the 2011 season. In 2022 and 2023, the two teams with the highest conference winning percentage faced off in the championship game.

The game was scheduled to be played in Allegiant Stadium in Paradise, Nevada, through 2022. In 2020, as a result of the COVID-19 pandemic, the game was hosted at the home stadium of the division winner with the better conference record, which was the Los Angeles Memorial Coliseum, home of the USC Trojans. From 2014 to 2019, the game was played at Levi's Stadium in Santa Clara, California. The first three editions were also held at the home stadium of the division winner with the better conference record: Autzen Stadium in 2011, Stanford Stadium in 2012, and Sun Devil Stadium in 2013. The game was usually held on the first Friday following the conclusion of the regular season.

The winner of the game was awarded the Pac-12 Conference's automatic berth in the Rose Bowl Game, unless the team was selected to play in the College Football Playoff (CFP), and/or in seasons where the Rose Bowl hosts a CFP semifinal.

The game was placed on hiatus in 2024 due to most Pac-12 members leaving the conference. In 2025, it was confirmed that the game will be reinstated in 2026 with the conference's reconstruction.

== History ==
Pac-12 Conference football members
– Full members

In 2011, the Pacific-10 Conference added Colorado and Utah, bringing the membership total to 12 teams and becoming the Pac-12. Consequently, the conference split into two six-team divisions and created an annual conference championship game.

In the first season of the newly expanded Pac-12 in 2011, USC finished first in the South Division with a 7–2 conference record but was ineligible to play in postseason games due to NCAA sanctions. UCLA (5–4) represented the South Division in the inaugural Pac-12 Football Championship Game as its second-place team. Oregon represented the North Division and defeated UCLA to become the conference's first football champion to be determined by a championship game.

Through the 2021 season, 9 of the 12 conference members have appeared in the Pac-12 Football Championship Game. All six teams of the South Division have made at least one appearance, while only Oregon, Stanford, Washington have represented the North Division. The North Division representatives won the first six contests and have a 9–2 overall record in the series through the 2021 season.

From 2011 through the 2021 season, the conference used to play the winner of each respective division, the South and the North against one another in the conference title game. Starting in the 2022 season, the Pac-12 elected to have the teams with the two highest conference winning percentage regardless of division play in the conference title game.

Broadcast rights to the game are held by ESPN and Fox Sports on a 12-year deal that began in 2012, where the rights alternate between ESPN in odd years and Fox in even years. Fox broadcast the inaugural game in 2011.

The game was placed on hiatus in 2024 and 2025, after nearly all of the Pac-12's members left the conference (leaving only Oregon State and Washington State). In 2025, with the conference's re-expansion in the 2026 season, it was announced that the championship game will return and be broadcast by CBS.

== Team selection criteria ==
From 2011 through 2021, the conference used division standings based on each team's overall conference record to select conference title game participants. In the event there was a tie two for first place, the championship game berth went to the winner of the season's head-to-head contest between the two teams. If three or more teams were tied, the following tiebreakers were used to determine the division champion:

- The following procedures will only be used to eliminate all but two teams, at which point the two-team tie-breaking procedure, head-to-head result, will be applied.
1. Head-to-head (best record in games among the tied teams).
2. Record in games played within the division.
3. Record against the next highest placed team in the division (based on record in all Conference games, both divisional and cross-divisional), proceeding through the division.
4. Record in common Conference games.
5. Highest ranking in the SportSource Analytics poll entering the final weekend of the regular season.

Starting in 2022 the two teams with the highest conference winning percentage will face off in the championship game.

Starting in 2026, the reconstituted Pac-12 will determine the championship game participants at the end of the round-robin conference schedule in Week 12, two weeks before the title game. Week 13 will feature "flex" games within the conference that will not count in the conference standings. The Pac-12 will determine the "flex" pairings, with only the home teams known before Week 12.

=== Home/away designation ===
The designated "home" and "away" teams are selected using a similar procedure:

- During the divisional era, the division champion with the best conference record was designated as the home team. Since then, the top team in the conference standings hosts. Through 2023, this was determined at the end of the regular season. From 2026, it will be determined after Week 12. If two teams are tied, the following criteria are considered.
1. Head-to-head result, if applicable
2. Record against the next highest placed common opponent in the conference (based on the record in all conference games), proceeding through the conference
3. Record in common conference games
4. Highest ranking in the SportSource Analytics poll following the final weekend of regular season games
5. Team with the most wins in school history

== Results ==
During the era of divisional play, every Pac-12 South program represented the division at least once, but USC or Utah have represented the South in 6 out of 7 seasons beginning in 2015, and only USC and Utah have ever won the Championship Game from the South. Only three schools (Oregon, Stanford, and Washington) represented the North division; each has won the Championship Game multiple times.

=== Results by year ===
Below are the results from all Pac-12 Football Championship Games played. The winning team appears in bold font, on a background of their primary team color. Unique among the "Power 5" Conferences, the Pac-12 holds the game on a Friday night following the last regular season game, rather than on a Saturday. Rankings are from the AP Poll released prior to the game.

Year	North Division		South Division		Site	Attendance	MVP
2011	8 **Oregon**	**49**	UCLA	31	Autzen Stadium • Eugene, OR	59,376	RB LaMichael James, Oregon
2012	8 **Stanford**	**27**	17 UCLA	24	Stanford Stadium • Stanford, CA	31,622	QB Kevin Hogan, Stanford
2013	7 **Stanford**	**38**	11 Arizona State	14	Sun Devil Stadium • Tempe, AZ	69,535	RB Tyler Gaffney, Stanford
2014	3 **Oregon**	**51**	8 Arizona	13	Levi's Stadium • Santa Clara, CA	45,618	QB Marcus Mariota, Oregon
2015	7 **Stanford**	**41**	24 USC	22	Levi's Stadium • Santa Clara, CA	58,476	RB Christian McCaffrey, Stanford
2016	4 **Washington**	**41**	9 Colorado	10	Levi's Stadium • Santa Clara, CA	47,118	S Taylor Rapp, Washington
2017	14 Stanford	28	11 **USC**	**31**	Levi's Stadium • Santa Clara, CA	48,031	QB Sam Darnold, USC
2018	11 **Washington**	**10**	17 Utah	3	Levi's Stadium • Santa Clara, CA	35,134	CB Byron Murphy, Washington
2019	13 **Oregon**	**37**	5 Utah	15	Levi's Stadium • Santa Clara, CA	38,679	RB C. J. Verdell, Oregon
2020	**Oregon**^	**31**	13 USC	24	L.A. Coliseum • Los Angeles, CA	0‡	DE Kayvon Thibodeaux, Oregon
2021	10 Oregon	10	14 **Utah**	**38**	Allegiant Stadium • Paradise, NV	56,511	LB Devin Lloyd, Utah
Year	No. 1 seed		No. 2 seed		Site	Attendance	MVP
2022	4 USC	24	11 **Utah**	**47**	Allegiant Stadium • Paradise, NV	61,195	QB Cameron Rising, Utah
2023	3 **Washington**	**34**	5 Oregon	31	Allegiant Stadium • Paradise, NV	61,195	QB Michael Penix Jr., Washington
2024	Not played						
2025	Not played						
2026	Boise State		San Diego State		Albertsons Stadium • Boise, Idaho		

† In 2011, UCLA, the second-place team in the South Division, played in place of USC, who was ineligible to participate due to NCAA sanctions.
^ In 2020, Oregon represented the North Division due to COVID-19 issues in Washington's program.
‡ 2020 game attendance was played behind closed doors due to COVID-19.

=== Results by team ===
==== Current members ====
Appearances	School	Wins	Losses	Pct.	Titles	Runners-up
1	Boise State	0	0	–		
1	San Diego State	0	0	–		
0	Colorado State	0	0	–		
0	Fresno State	0	0	–		
0	Oregon State	0	0	–		
0	Texas State	0	0	–		
0	Utah State	0	0	–		
0	Washington State	0	0	–		

==== Former members ====
Appearances	School	Wins	Losses	Pct.	Titles	Runners-up
6	Oregon	4	2	.667	2011, 2014, 2019, 2020	2021, 2023
4	Stanford	3	1	.750	2012, 2013, 2015	2017
4	Utah	2	2	.500	2021, 2022	2018, 2019
4	USC	1	3	.250	2017	2015, 2020, 2022
3	Washington	3	0	1.000	2016, 2018, 2023	
2	UCLA	0	2	.000		2011, 2012
1	Arizona	0	1	.000		2014
1	Arizona State	0	1	.000		2013
1	Colorado	0	1	.000		2016

=== No results yet by team ===
School
Colorado State
Fresno State
Oregon State
Texas State
Utah State
Washington State

- Colorado State, Fresno State, Oregon State, Texas State, Utah State and Washington State have yet to appear in the Pac-12 Football Championship Game.
- Boise State, Colorado State, Fresno State, San Diego State, Texas State, and Utah State will play their first season of Pac-12 football in 2026.

=== No results by team ===
School
California

- California never made an appearance in the Pac-12 Football Championship Game.

=== Common matchups ===
Matchups that have occurred more than once:

# of Times	North Division	South Division	Record	Years Played
2	Oregon	Utah	Tied, 1–1	2019, 2021
2	Stanford	USC	Tied, 1–1	2015, 2017

== Site selection criteria ==
During its first three years, the site of the Pac-12 Championship Game was the home stadium of the division champion with the superior overall conference record. In the event that the two division champions were tied, the head-to-head record would be used as the tiebreaker. If the two teams did not meet during the season, a BCS component was to be used.

After three years of the home-hosting model, the Pac-12 announced a three-year deal to host the game at the neutral site of Levi's Stadium in Santa Clara, California. In 2017, the Pac-12 announced it would keep the game at Levi's Stadium through 2019 with an option for 2020.

On July 24, 2019, it was announced that Allegiant Stadium, then under the working name Las Vegas Stadium, would host the Pac-12 Championship Game starting in 2021.

On October 3, 2020, the Pac-12 announced that the 2020 Pac-12 Championship Game would revert to the original home-hosting model due to the COVID-19 pandemic, with the 2021 game starting the two-year run at Allegiant Stadium.

On May 18, 2022, the Pac-12 announced that starting with the 2022 edition, the two teams with the highest conference winning percentage will face off in the championship game. No changes were made to the 2022 Pac-12 schedule, which had already been set using the former divisional alignment. The conference also announced it was reviewing several potential scheduling models for future seasons.

== Game records ==
Team	Record, Team vs. Opponent	Year
Most points scored (one team)	51, Oregon vs. Arizona	2014
Most points scored (losing team)	31, UCLA vs. Oregon; Oregon vs. Washington	2011, 2023
Fewest points scored (winning team)	10, Washington vs. Utah	2018
Fewest points scored	3, Utah vs. Washington	2018
Most points scored (both teams)	80, Oregon (49) vs. UCLA (31)	2011
Fewest points scored (both teams)	13, Washington (10) vs. Utah (3)	2018
Most points scored in a half	35, Oregon (1st half) vs. UCLA	2011
Most points scored in a half (both teams)	52, Oregon vs. UCLA (1st half)	2011
Largest margin of victory	38, Oregon (51) vs. Arizona (13)	2014
Smallest margin of victory	3, Stanford (27) vs. UCLA (24)	2012
Total yards	627, Oregon (326 passing, 301 rushing) vs. Arizona	2014
Rushing yards	352, Oregon vs. UCLA	2011
Passing yards	363, USC vs. Utah	2022
First downs	31, Oregon vs. Arizona	2014
Fewest yards allowed	188, Washington vs. Utah (137 passing, 51 rushing)	2018
Fewest rushing yards allowed	51, Washington vs. Utah	2018
Fewest passing yards allowed	81, Washington vs. Colorado	2016
Individual	Record, Player, Team vs. Opponent	Year
All-purpose yards	461, Christian McCaffrey, Stanford vs. USC	2015
Touchdowns (all-purpose)	5, Marcus Mariota, Oregon vs. Arizona	2014
Rushing yards	219, LaMichael James, Oregon vs. UCLA	2011
Rushing touchdowns	3, shared by four players, most recent: C. J. Verdell, Oregon vs. Utah	2019
Passing yards	363, Caleb Williams, USC vs. Utah	2022
Passing touchdowns	3, shared by: Darron Thomas, Oregon vs. UCLA; Cameron Rising, Utah vs. USC; Caleb Williams, USC vs. Utah	2011; 2022; 2022
Receiving yards	146, Michael Pittman Jr., USC vs. Stanford	2017
Receiving touchdowns	2, shared by: Nelson Rosario, UCLA vs. Oregon; Kaden Smith, Stanford vs. USC	2011; 2017
Tackles	19, Kenneth Olugbode, Colorado vs. Washington	2016
Sacks	2.5, Kayvon Thibodeaux, Oregon vs. Utah	2019
Interceptions	2, shared by three players, most recent: Jamal Hill, Oregon vs. USC	2020
Long Plays	Record, Player, Team vs. Opponent	Year
Touchdown run	70, C. J. Verdell, Oregon vs. Utah	2019
Touchdown pass	65, D. J. Foster from Taylor Kelly, Arizona State vs. Stanford	2013
Kickoff return	48, shared by: Anthony Julmisse, Colorado vs. Washington; Phillip Lindsay, Colorado vs. Washington	2016; 2016
Punt return	31, Christian McCaffrey, Stanford vs. USC	2015
Interception return	80, Ed Reynolds, Stanford vs. UCLA	2012
Fumble return		
Punt	62, Tristan Vizcaino, Washington vs. Colorado	2016
Field goal	53, Matt Gay, Utah vs. Washington	2018
Miscellaneous	Record, Team vs. Team	Year
Game attendance	69,535, Stanford vs. Arizona State	2013

== See also ==
- List of NCAA Division I FBS conference championship games
- List of Pac-12 Conference football champions
