= 2018 Washington Huskies football team =

American college football season

2018 Washington Huskies football

Pac-12 champion Pac-12 North Division co-champion

Pac-12 Championship Game, W 10–3 vs. Utah

Rose Bowl, L 23–28 vs. Ohio State
- Conference: Pac-12 Conference
- North Division

Ranking
- Coaches: No. 13
- AP: No. 13
- Record: 10–4 (7–2 Pac-12)
- Head coach: Chris Petersen (5th season)
- Offensive coordinator: Bush Hamdan (1st season)
- Co-offensive coordinator: Matt Lubick (2nd season)
- Offensive scheme: Spread
- Defensive coordinator: Jimmy Lake (3rd season)
- Co-defensive coordinator: Pete Kwiatkowski (5th season)
- Base defense: 3–4
- Home stadium: Alaska Airlines Field at Husky Stadium

2018 Pac-12 Conference football standings
	Conf.			Overall
Team	W		L	W		L
North Division
No. 13 Washington xy$	7	–	2	10	–	4
No. 10 Washington State x	7	–	2	11	–	2
Stanford	6	–	3	9	–	4
Oregon	5	–	4	9	–	4
California	4	–	5	7	–	6
Oregon State	1	–	8	2	–	10
South Division
Utah xy	6	–	3	9	–	5
Arizona State	5	–	4	7	–	6
USC	4	–	5	5	–	7
Arizona	4	–	5	5	–	7
UCLA	3	–	6	3	–	9
Colorado	2	–	7	5	–	7
Championship: Washington 10, Utah 3
$ – Conference champion; x – Division champion/co-champions; y – Championship game participant; Rankings from AP Poll

The 2018 Washington Huskies football team represented the University of Washington during the 2018 NCAA Division I FBS football season. Chris Petersen led the team in his fifth season as head coach. Washington competed as a member of the North Division of the Pac-12 Conference and played their home games on campus at Husky Stadium in Seattle.

The Huskies began the year ranked sixth in the preseason AP Poll and were the preseason favorites to win the Pac-12. In their first game of the year, Washington lost to then-No. 9 Auburn in the Chick-fil-A Kickoff Game played in Atlanta. The team rebounded and won the following five games before losing on the road to rival Oregon in overtime, and again two weeks later against California. With the Pac-12 North Division title on the line, Washington defeated in-state rival and seventh-ranked Washington State on the road in the 111th Apple Cup. The Huskies won their second Pac-12 title in three years by defeating Utah in the 2018 Pac-12 Football Championship Game. The team was invited to the Rose Bowl, where they were defeated by Ohio State to end the year at 10–4, 7–2 in conference play.

Washington was led offensively by senior quarterback Jake Browning, who threw for 3,192 yards and 16 touchdowns, and senior running back Myles Gaskin, who rushed for 1,268 yards and 12 touchdowns. Browning became the school's all-time passing leader on September 29 in the team's game against BYU, while Gaskin added to his all-time career rushing records that he set in 2017. The Husky defense was led by senior linebacker Ben Burr-Kirven, who led the Pac-12 in tackles and was named the Pac-12 Defensive Player of the Year. Burr-Kirven was named a first-team All-American by several selectors including the Associated Press.

== Preseason ==
=== Recruiting ===
The Huskies signed a total of 20 recruits.

College recruiting (2018)
Name	Hometown	School	Height	Weight	Commit date
Marquis Spiker; WR	Murrieta, California	Murrieta Valley	6 ft 3 in (1.91 m)	180 lb (82 kg)	Mar 17, 2017
Marquis Spiker; WR	Recruit ratings: Rivals: 247Sports:				
Colson Yankoff; QB	Coeur d'Alene, Idaho	Coeur d'Alene	6 ft 4 in (1.93 m)	204 lb (93 kg)	Mar 22, 2017
Colson Yankoff; QB	Recruit ratings: Rivals: 247Sports:				
Jacob Sirmon; QB	Bothell, Washington	Bothell	6 ft 4 in (1.93 m)	227 lb (103 kg)	Dec 13, 2015
Jacob Sirmon; QB	Recruit ratings: Rivals: 247Sports:				
Tuli Letuligasenoa; DT	Concord, California	De La Salle	6 ft 1 in (1.85 m)	338 lb (153 kg)	Feb 5, 2018
Tuli Letuligasenoa; DT	Recruit ratings: Rivals: 247Sports:				
Julius Irvin; S	Anaheim, California	Servite	6 ft 1 in (1.85 m)	177 lb (80 kg)	Jan 31, 2018
Julius Irvin; S	Recruit ratings: Rivals: 247Sports:				
Kyler Gordon; CB	Everett, Washington	Archbishop Murphy	5 ft 11 in (1.80 m)	177 lb (80 kg)	Dec 21, 2017
Kyler Gordon; CB	Recruit ratings: Rivals: 247Sports:				
Sam Taimani; OG	Salt Lake City, Utah	East	6 ft 2 in (1.88 m)	320 lb (150 kg)	Dec 9, 2017
Sam Taimani; OG	Recruit ratings: Rivals: 247Sports:				
Austin Osborne; WR	Mission Viejo, California	Mission Viejo	6 ft 2 in (1.88 m)	188 lb (85 kg)	Feb 10, 2017
Austin Osborne; WR	Recruit ratings: Rivals: 247Sports:				
Trey Lowe; WR	Portland, Oregon	Jesuit	5 ft 7 in (1.70 m)	174 lb (79 kg)	Mar 15, 2017
Trey Lowe; WR	Recruit ratings: Rivals: 247Sports:				
Draco Bynum; DE	Wilsonville, Oregon	Wilsonville	6 ft 4 in (1.93 m)	258 lb (117 kg)	Apr 22, 2017
Draco Bynum; DE	Recruit ratings: Rivals: 247Sports:				
Matteo Mele; OT	Tucson, Arizona	Salpointe Catholic	6 ft 5 in (1.96 m)	277 lb (126 kg)	Jun 26, 2017
Matteo Mele; OT	Recruit ratings: Rivals: 247Sports:				
Jackson Sirmon; LB	Brentwood, Tennessee	Brentwood Academy	6 ft 2 in (1.88 m)	224 lb (102 kg)	Dec 29, 2016
Jackson Sirmon; LB	Recruit ratings: Rivals: 247Sports:				
Devin Culp; TE	Spokane, Washington	Gonzaga Prep	6 ft 3 in (1.91 m)	235 lb (107 kg)	Apr 8, 2017
Devin Culp; TE	Recruit ratings: Rivals: 247Sports:				
M.J. Tafisi; LB	Sandy, Utah	Alta	6 ft 2 in (1.88 m)	224 lb (102 kg)	Dec 8, 2017
M.J. Tafisi; LB	Recruit ratings: Rivals: 247Sports:				
Richard Newton; RB	Palmdale, California	Palmdale	6 ft 1 in (1.85 m)	183 lb (83 kg)	Nov 27, 2017
Richard Newton; RB	Recruit ratings: Rivals: 247Sports:				
Victor Curne; OG	Houston, Texas	Second Baptist	6 ft 3 in (1.91 m)	313 lb (142 kg)	Jul 24, 2017
Victor Curne; OG	Recruit ratings: Rivals: 247Sports:				
Zion Tupuola-Fetui; LB	Pearl City, Hawaii	Pearl City	6 ft 2 in (1.88 m)	250 lb (110 kg)	Dec 9, 2017
Zion Tupuola-Fetui; LB	Recruit ratings: Rivals: 247Sports:				
M.J. Ale; OT	Tacoma, Washington	Fife	6 ft 6 in (1.98 m)	361 lb (164 kg)	Aug 4, 2017
M.J. Ale; OT	Recruit ratings: Rivals: 247Sports:				
Dominique Hampton; CB	Peoria, Arizona	Centennial	6 ft 2 in (1.88 m)	197 lb (89 kg)	Aug 7, 2017
Dominique Hampton; CB	Recruit ratings: Rivals: 247Sports:				
Mosiah Nasili-Liu; DE	Puyallup, Washington	Emerald Ridge	6 ft 2 in (1.88 m)	281 lb (127 kg)	Nov 23, 2017
Mosiah Nasili-Liu; DE	Recruit ratings: Rivals: 247Sports:				
Overall recruit ranking: Rivals: 14 247Sports: 9
Note: In many cases, Scout, Rivals, 247Sports, On3, and ESPN may conflict in their listings of height and weight.; In these cases, the average was taken. ESPN grades are on a 100-point scale.; Sources: "Washington Football Commitments". Rivals.; "2018 Washington Football Commits". Scout.; "Scout.com Team Recruiting Rankings". Scout.; "2018 Team Ranking". Rivals.com.

=== Transfers ===
The Huskies added 1 player and lost 7 players due to transfers.

2018 Transfers
Name	Pos.	Height	Weight	Year	Hometown	Transferred from
Jacob Eason	QB	6'5	235	Junior	Lake Stevens, WA	Georgia
Name	Pos.	Height	Weight	Year	Hometown	Transferred to
Daniel Bridge-Gadd	QB	6'2	211	(redshirt) Junior	Phoenix, AZ	Northern Arizona
K. J. Carta-Samuels	QB	6'2	225	(redshirt) Senior	Saratoga, CA	Colorado State
Brayden Dickey	WR	6'5	230	(redshirt) Senior	North Vancouver, B.C.	New Mexico
Jomon Dotson	DB	5'10	181	(redshirt) Senior	American Canyon, CA	Nevada
Milo Eifler	OLB	6'1	225	(redshirt) Sophomore	Oakland, CA	Illinois
Ricky McCoy	DT	6'2	301	(redshirt) Junior	Fresno, CA	Fresno State
Bryce Sterk	LB	6'4	234	(redshirt) Junior	Lynden, WA	Montana State

=== Award watch lists ===
Listed in the order that they were released

Award	Player	Position	Year
Lott Trophy	Ben Burr-Kirven	LB	SR
Lott Trophy	Taylor Rapp	S	JR
Rimington Trophy	Nick Harris	C	JR
Chuck Bednarik Award	Greg Gaines	DT	SR
Chuck Bednarik Award	Taylor Rapp	S	JR
Maxwell Award	Jake Browning	QB	SR
Maxwell Award	Myles Gaskin	RB	SR
Davey O'Brien Award	Jake Browning	QB	SR
Doak Walker Award	Myles Gaskin	RB	SR
John Mackey Award	Drew Sample	TE	SR
Butkus Award	Tevis Bartlett	LB	SR
Jim Thorpe Award	Byron Murphy	DB	SO
Jim Thorpe Award	Taylor Rapp	S	JR
Bronko Nagurski Trophy	Ben Burr-Kirven	LB	SR
Bronko Nagurski Trophy	Greg Gaines	DT	SR
Bronko Nagurski Trophy	Taylor Rapp	S	JR
Outland Trophy	Trey Adams	OL	SR
Outland Trophy	Greg Gaines	DT	SR
Outland Trophy	Kaleb McGary	OL	SR
Wuerffel Trophy	Tevis Bartlett	LB	SR
Walter Camp Award	Jake Browning	QB	SR
Walter Camp Award	Myles Gaskin	RB	SR
Johnny Unitas Golden Arm Award	Jake Browning	QB	SR
Manning Award	Jake Browning	QB	SR
Earl Campbell Tyler Rose Award	Aaron Fuller	WR	JR

=== Pac-12 Media Day ===
The 2018 Pac-12 media day took place on July 25, 2018, in Hollywood, California. Chris Petersen (HC), Jake Browning (QB) & Jojo McIntosh (DB) at Pac-12 Media Day. The Pac-12 media poll was released with the Huskies predicted to win the Pac-12 North division title and Pac-12 overall.

== Schedule ==
Date	Time	Opponent	Rank	Site	TV	Result	Attendance
September 1	12:30 p.m.	vs. No. 9 Auburn*	No. 6	Mercedes-Benz Stadium; Atlanta, GA (Chick-fil-A Kickoff Game)	ABC	L 16–21	70,103
September 8	2:00 p.m.	North Dakota*	No. 9	Husky Stadium; Seattle, WA	P12N	W 45–3	68,093
September 15	7:00 p.m.	at Utah	No. 10	Rice–Eccles Stadium; Salt Lake City, UT	ESPN	W 21–7	47,445
September 22	7:30 p.m.	Arizona State	No. 10	Husky Stadium; Seattle, WA	ESPN	W 27–20	71,200
September 29	5:30 p.m.	No. 20 BYU*	No. 11	Husky Stadium; Seattle, WA	FOX	W 35–7	70,155
October 6	4:30 p.m.	at UCLA	No. 10	Rose Bowl; Pasadena, CA	FOX	W 31–24	51,123
October 13	12:30 p.m.	at No. 17 Oregon	No. 7	Autzen Stadium; Eugene, OR (rivalry)	ABC/ESPN2	L 27–30 ^{OT}	58,691
October 20	12:30 p.m.	Colorado^{†}	No. 15	Husky Stadium; Seattle, WA	FOX	W 27–13	68,798
October 27	3:30 p.m.	at California	No. 15	California Memorial Stadium; Berkeley, CA	FS1	L 10–12	39,138
November 3	6:00 p.m.	Stanford		Husky Stadium; Seattle, WA	P12N	W 27–23	69,690
November 17	1:30 p.m.	Oregon State	No. 18	Husky Stadium; Seattle, WA	P12N	W 42–23	66,469
November 23	5:30 p.m.	at No. 8 Washington State	No. 16	Martin Stadium; Pullman, WA (Apple Cup)	FOX	W 28–15	32,952
November 30	5:00 p.m.	vs. No. 17 Utah	No. 11	Levi's Stadium; Santa Clara, CA (Pac-12 Championship Game)	FOX	W 10–3	35,134
January 1, 2019	2:00 p.m.	vs. No. 6 Ohio State*	No. 9	Rose Bowl; Pasadena, CA (Rose Bowl, College GameDay)	ESPN	L 23–28	91,853
*Non-conference game; ^{†}Homecoming; Rankings from AP Poll and CFP Rankings after October 30 released prior to game; All times are in Pacific time

== Rankings ==
Ranking movements Legend: ██ Increase in ranking ██ Decrease in ranking — = Not ranked RV = Received votes т = Tied with team above or below
	Week															
Poll	Pre	1	2	3	4	5	6	7	8	9	10	11	12	13	14	Final
AP	6	9	10	10-T	11	10	7	15	15	RV	20	17	16	10	9	13
Coaches	6	11	12	12	11	10	7	14	13	19	18	17	16	11	9	13
CFP	Not released									—	25	18	16	11	9	Not released

== Personnel ==
=== Coaching staff ===
Name	Position	Alma mater
Chris Petersen	Head coach	UC Davis (1988)
Bush Hamdan	Offensive coordinator/quarterbacks coach	Boise State (2008)
Will Harris	Assistant defensive backs coach	USC (2009)
Keith Bhonapha	Recruiting coordinator/running backs coach	Hawai'i (2003)
Bob Gregory	Assistant head coach/inside linebackers coach/special teams coordinator	Washington State (1987)
Scott Huff	Offensive line coach/Run game coordinator	Arizona State (2002)
Pete Kwiatkowski	Co-defensive coordinator/Outside linebackers coach	Boise State (1990)
Jimmy Lake	Defensive coordinator/defensive backs coach	Eastern Washington (2000)
Matt Lubick	Co-offensive coordinator/wide receivers coach	Western Montana (1994)
Ikaika Malloe	Defensive line coach	Washington (1997)
Jordan Paopao	Tight ends coach	San Diego (2006)
Tim Socha	Strength & conditioning coach	Minnesota (1999)

=== Roster ===
2018 Washington Huskies football roster
Quarterback: 3 Jake Browning – senior (6'2, 210); 7 Colson Yankoff – freshman (6'4, 209); 10 Jacob Eason – junior (6'6, 227); 11 Jacob Sirmon – freshman (6'5, 221); 13 Jake Haener – (redshirt) freshman (6'0, 196); Tailback: 9 Myles Gaskin – senior (5'10, 193); 22 Richard Newton – freshman (6'0, 195); 24 Kamari Pleasant – (redshirt) sophomore (6'0, 204); 25 Sean McGrew – (redshirt) sophomore (5'7, 174); 26 Salvon Ahmed – sophomore (5'11, 195); 35 Jamyn Patu – freshman (5'11, 203); 36 Malik Braxton – junior (5'10, 197); Wide receiver: 2 Aaron Fuller – junior (5'10, 186); 5 Andre Baccellia – (redshirt) junior (5'10, 173); 6 Chico McClatcher – senior (5'8, 181); 8 Marquis Spiker – freshman (6'3, 191); 12 Trey Lowe – freshman (5'8, 184); 15 Alex Cook – (redshirt) freshman (6'1, 193); 18 Austin Osborne – freshman (6'2, 194); 20 Ty Jones – sophomore (6'4, 209); 21 Quinten Pounds – (redshirt) junior (6'0, 180); 28 Terrell Bynum – (redshirt) freshman (6'1, 194); 29 Josh Rasmussen – (redshirt) junior (5'11, 184); 30 David Pritchard – freshman (6'2, 175); 47 Ian Biddle – senior (6'0, 187); 80 Max Richmond – (redshirt) senior (5'10, 178); 82 Jordan Chin – (redshirt) sophomore (6'0, 171); 85 Fatu Sua-Godinet – junior (6'0, 186); 89 John Gardner – (redshirt) senior (6'3, 193); Tight end: 1 Hunter Bryant – sophomore (6'2, 224); 23 Deshon Williams – senior (6'2, 230); 37 Jack Westover – freshman (6'4, 229); 45 Jusstis Warren – (redshirt) junior (6'2, 249); 83 Devin Culp – freshman (6'3, 232); 84 Michael Neal – (redshirt) junior (6'4, 245); 86 Jacob Kizer – sophomore (6'4, 264); 87 Cade Otton – (redshirt) freshman (6'5, 249); 88 Drew Sample – (redshirt) senior (6'5, 251)	Offensive line: 51 Jaxson Kirkland – (redshirt) freshman (6'7, 315); 56 Nick Harris – junior (6'1, 300); 58 Kaleb McGary – (redshirt) senior (6'8, 324); 59 Henry Roberts – (redshirt) junior (6'6, 303); 62 Noah Hellyer – freshman (6'3, 260); 63 Cole Norgaard – (redshirt) freshman (6'4, 300); 64 A.J. Kneip – (redshirt) sophomore (6'2, 295); 66 Henry Bainivalu – (redshirt) freshman (6'5, 321); 67 Chase Skuza – (redshirt) freshman (6'6, 306); 68 M.J. Ale – freshman (6'5, 362); 69 Will Pliska – freshman (6'5, 288); 70 Jared Hilbers – (redshirt) junior (6'7, 313); 71 Matt James – (redshirt) senior (6'5, 300); 72 Trey Adams – senior (6'8, 316); 73 Gage Harty – freshman (6'4, 245); 75 Jesse Sosebee – (redshirt) senior (6'5, 327); 76 Luke Wattenberg – (redshirt) sophomore (6'5, 307); 77 Devin Burleson – (redshirt) junior (6'8, 333); 78 Matteo Mele – freshman (6'5, 286); 79 Victor Curne – freshman (6'3, 319); Defensive line: 56 Jared Pulu – (redshirt) junior (6'4, 281); 57 John Clark – (redshirt) junior (6'4, 275); 59 Draco Bynum – freshman (6'3, 257); 90 Josiah Bronson – (redshirt) junior (6'3, 280); 91 Tuli Letuligasenoa – freshman (6'1, 336); 92 Jaylen Johnson – (redshirt) senior (6'3, 286); 93 Jarryn Bush – (redshirt) freshman (6'1, 252); 94 Sam Taimani – freshman (6'2, 318); 95 Levi Onwuzurike – (redshirt) sophomore (6'3, 282); 96 Shane Bowman – (redshirt) senior (6'4, 291); 97 Jason Scrempos – (redshirt) junior (6'6, 292); 98 Mosiah Nasili-Liu – freshman (6'2, 291); 99 Greg Gaines – (redshirt) senior (6'2, 316); Long snapper: 49 A.J. Carty – (redshirt) junior (6'2, 239); 78 Luke Lane – (redshirt) sophomore (6'0, 207); Placekicker: 42 Van Soderberg – (redshirt) sophomore (6'0, 195); 45 Dylan Williams – freshman (5'9, 150); 47 Peyton Henry – (redshirt) freshman (5'11, 195)	Punter: 32 Joel Whitford – (redshirt) junior (6'3, 212); 46 Race Porter – (redshirt) sophomore (6'2, 185); Inside linebacker: 13 Brandon Wellington – junior (6'0, 222); 15 D.J. Beavers – (redshirt) junior (6'1, 219); 17 Tevis Bartlett – senior (6'2, 233); 25 Ben Burr-Kirven – senior (6'0, 221); 30 Kyler Manu – (redshirt) junior (6'1, 238); 35 Ben Hines – freshman (6'0, 228); 43 Jackson Sirmon – freshman (6'2, 229); 48 Edefuan Ulofoshio – freshman (6'1, 226); 50 M.J. Tafisi – freshman (6'2, 221); 53 Jake Wambaugh – (redshirt) senior (6'2, 224); 54 Matt Preston – (redshirt) senior (6'2, 218); Outside linebacker: 8 Benning Potoa'e – (redshirt) junior (6'3, 277); 9 Joe Tryon-Shoyinka – (redshirt) freshman (6'5, 267); 16 Amandre Williams – (redshirt) sophomore (6'2, 241); 41 Myles Rice – (redshirt) sophomore (6'3, 243); 52 Ariel Ngata – (redshirt) freshman (6'2, 217); 55 Ryan Bowman – (redshirt) sophomore (6'0, 263); 58 Zion Tupuola-Fetui – freshman (6'3, 253); Defensive back: 1 Byron Murphy – (redshirt) sophomore (5'11, 182); 3 Elijah Molden – sophomore (5'10, 190); 4 Austin Joyner – (redshirt) junior (5'10, 200); 5 Myles Bryant – junior (5'8, 182); 7 Taylor Rapp – junior (6'0, 200); 11 Brandon McKinney – sophomore (6'0, 201); 14 JoJo McIntosh – (redshirt) senior (6'1, 205); 18 Isaiah Gilchrist – (redshirt) sophomore (5'11, 202); 19 Kyler Gordon – freshman (5'11, 189); 21 Dominique Hampton – freshman (6'2, 200); 23 Jordan Miller – senior (6'1, 181); 27 Keith Taylor – sophomore (6'2, 200); 28 Angelo Sarchi – freshman (5'11, 195); 29 Julius Irvin – freshman (6'1, 183); 36 Dustin Bush – (redshirt) junior (5'9, 180); 38 Zechariah Brown – sophomore (5'10, 184); 39 Sean Vergara – (redshirt) senior (6'2, 182)

Medical retirement during season.
Left team during the season

== Game summaries ==
=== vs Auburn ===
Chick-fil-A Kickoff Game – Game summary

Quarter	1	2	3	4	Total
No. 6 Washington	3	10	0	3	16
No. 9 Auburn	9	6	0	6	21

at Mercedes-Benz Stadium • Atlanta, GA

- Date: September 1, 2018
- Game time: 12:30 p.m. PDT
- Game weather: Dome
- Game attendance: 70,103
- Referee: John O'Neill
- TV announcers (ABC): Steve Levy, Brian Griese, and Todd McShay

Game information

First Quarter

- AUB – Sal Cannella 10 yd pass from Jarrett Stidham (2 pt conversion failed), 11:45 (AUB 6–0)
- AUB – Anders Carlson 32 yd field goal, 5:39 (AUB 9–0)
- UW – Peyton Henry 31 yd field goal, 2:59 (AUB 9–3)

Second Quarter

- AUB – Anders Carlson 28 yd field goal, 10:35 (AUB 12–3)
- UW – Peyton Henry 28 yd field goal, 5:57 (AUB 12–6)
- AUB – Anders Carlson 53 yd field goal, 1:23 (AUB 15–6)
- UW – Quinten Pounds 13 yd pass from Jake Browning (Peyton Henry kick), 0:43 (AUB 15–13)

Fourth Quarter

- UW – Peyton Henry 30 yd field goal, 14:06 (UW 16–15)
- AUB – JaTarvious Whitlow 10 yd run (2 pt conversion failed), 6:15 (AUB 21–16)

Top passers

- UW – Jake Browning: 18/32, 296 yards, one touchdown, one interception
- AUB – Jarrett Stidham: 26/36, 273 yards, one touchdown

Top rushers

- UW – Myles Gaskin: 17 attempts, 75 yards
- AUB – Kam Martin: 22 attempts, 80 yards

Top receiving

- UW – Aaron Fuller: 7 receptions, 135 yards
- AUB – Chandler Cox: 4 receptions, 52 yards. Ryan Davis: 7 receptions, 52 yards

=== North Dakota ===
North Dakota at Washington – Game summary

Quarter	1	2	3	4	Total
North Dakota	0	0	3	0	3
No. 9 Washington	10	7	7	21	45

at Husky Stadium • Seattle, WA

- Date: September 8, 2018
- Game time: 2:00 p.m. PDT
- Game weather: 69 °F (21 °C) • Overcast • Wind SE @ 6 mph (10 km/h)
- Game attendance: 68,093
- Referee: Chris Wiggins
- TV announcers (P12N): Ted Robinson, Yogi Roth, and Jill Savage

Game information

Top passers

- UND – Nate Ketteringham: 16/30, 96 yards
- UW – Jake Browning: 23/37, 313 yards, two touchdowns, two interceptions

Top rushers

- UND – John Santiago: 18 attempts, 139 yards
- UW – Myles Gaskin: 15 attempts, 53 yards, one touchdown

Top receiving

- UND – Noah Manzek: 3 receptions, 23 yards
- UW – Quinten Pounds: 3 receptions, 98 yards

=== At Utah ===
Washington at Utah – Game summary

Quarter	1	2	3	4	Total
No. 10 Washington	7	7	7	0	21
Utah	7	0	0	0	7

at Rice-Eccles Stadium • Salt Lake City, UT

- Date: September 15, 2018
- Game time: 7:00 p.m. PDT
- Game weather: 84 °F (29 °C) • Partly cloudy • Wind S @ 12 mph (19 km/h)
- Game attendance: 47,445
- Referee: Chris Coyte
- TV announcers (ESPN): Steve Levy, Brian Griese, and Todd McShay

Game information

Top passers

- UW – Jake Browning: 14/24, 155 yards, one touchdown, one interception
- UU – Tyler Huntley: 20/38, 138 yards, one interception

Top rushers

- UW – Myles Gaskin: 30 attempts, 143 yards, one touchdown
- UU – Zack Moss: 13 attempts, 67 yards, one touchdown

Top receiving

- UW – Aaron Fuller: 6 receptions, 108 yards
- UU – Britain Covey: 8 receptions, 54 yards

=== Arizona State ===
Arizona State at Washington – Game summary

Quarter	1	2	3	4	Total
Arizona State	10	0	3	7	20
No. 10 Washington	14	3	3	7	27

at Husky Stadium • Seattle, WA

- Date: September 22, 2018
- Game time: 7:30 PDT
- Game weather: 60 °F (16 °C) • Cloudy • Wind SW @ 4 mph (6 km/h)
- Game attendance: 71,200
- Referee: Michael Mothershed
- TV announcers (ESPN): Bob Wischusen, Brock Huard, and Alison Williams

Game information

First quarter

- (12:02) ASU – Eno Benjamin 1-yard run, Brandon Ruiz kick (Drive: 6 plays, 20 yards, 2:45; Arizona State 7–0)
- (8:05) WASH – Aaron Fuller 11-yard pass from Jake Browning, Peyton Henry kick (Drive: 9 plays, 80 yards, 3:51; Tied 7–7)
- (3:53) ASU – Brandon Ruiz 48-yard field goal (Drive: 12 plays, 47 yards, 4:07; Arizona State 10–7)
- (0:57) WASH – Ty Jones 19-yard pass from Jake Browning, Peyton Henry kick (Drive: 5 plays, 75 yards, 2:56; Washington 14–10)

Second quarter

- (5:05) WASH – Peyton Henry 26-yard field goal (Drive: 16 plays, 73 yards, 7:13; Washington 17–10)

Third quarter

- (10:40) ASU – Brandon Ruiz 41-yard field goal (Drive: 10 plays, 44 yards, 4:13; Washington 17–13)
- (7:17) WASH – Peyton Henry 29-yard field goal (Drive: 8 plays, 63 yards, 3:23; Washington 20–13)

Fourth quarter

- (10:59) WASH – Cade Otton 5-yard pass from Jake Browning, Peyton Henry kick (Drive: 8 plays, 67 yards, 4:42; Washington 27–13)
- (2:54) ASU – Manny Wilkins 1-yard run, Brandon Ruiz kick (Drive: 10 plays, 55 yards, 4:16; Washington 27–20)

Top passers

- ASU – Manny Wilkins: 17/27, 104 yards
- UW – Jake Browning: 15/22, 202 yards, 3 touchdown

Top rushers

- ASU – Eno Benjamin: 26 attempts, 104 yards, one touchdown
- UW – Myles Gaskin: 21 attempts, 86 yards

Top receiving

- ASU – N'Keal Harry: 5 receptions, 20 yards
- UW – Aaron Fuller: 3 receptions, 50 yards, one touchdown

=== BYU ===
BYU at Washington – Game summary

Quarter	1	2	3	4	Total
No. 20 BYU	0	0	0	7	7
No. 11 Washington	7	14	14	0	35

at Husky Stadium • Seattle, WA

- Date: September 29, 2018
- Game time: 5:30 pm PDT
- Game weather: 65 °F (18 °C) • Cloudy • Wind SE @ 5 mph (8 km/h)
- Game attendance: 70,155
- Referee: Brandon Cruse
- TV announcers (FOX): Aaron Goldsmith, Brady Quinn, and Bruce Feldman

Game information

First quarter

- (3:45) WASH – Salvon Ahmed 5-yard run, Peyton Henry kick (Drive: 8 plays, 68 yards, 3:45; Washington 7–0)

Second quarter

- (11:05) WASH – Myles Gaskin 6-yard run, Peyton Henry kick (Drive: 6 plays, 72 yards, 2:37; Washington 14–0)
- (0:05) WASH – Jake Browning 9-yard run, Peyton Henry kick (Drive: 3 plays, 24 yards, 0:17; Washington 21–0)

Third quarter

- (9:31) WASH – Drew Sample 15-yard reception from Jake Browning, Peyton Henry kick (Drive: 7 plays, 48 yards, 3:47; Washington 28–0)
- (1:24) WASH – Salvon Ahmed 6-yard run, Peyton Henry kick (Drive: 8 plays, 80 yards, 4:42; Washington 35–0)

Fourth quarter

- (0:41) BYU – Lopini Katoa 1-yard run, Skyler Southam kick (Drive: 7 plays, 21 yards, 4:08; Washington 35–7)

Top passers

- BYU – Tanner Mangum: 18/21, 160 yards
- UW – Jake Browning: 23/25, 277 yards, one touchdown

Top rushers

- BYU – Lopini Katoa: 8 attempts, 27 yards
- UW – Salvon Ahmed: 10 attempts, 86 yards, two touchdowns

Top receiving

- BYU – Lopini Katoa: 7 receptions, 66 yards
- UW – Aaron Fuller: 8 receptions, 107 yards

=== At UCLA ===
Washington at UCLA – Game summary

Quarter	1	2	3	4	Total
No. 10 Washington	7	17	0	7	31
UCLA	0	7	3	14	24

at Rose Bowl • Pasadena, CA

- Date: October 6, 2018
- Game time: 4:30 pm PDT
- Game weather: Cloudy, 76 °F (24 °C)
- Game attendance: 51,123
- Referee: Mike McCabe
- TV announcers (FOX): Brian Custer, Ben Leber and Jen Hale

Game information

First quarter

- WASH – Aaron Fuller 25-yard pass from Jake Browning (Peyton Henry Kick), 1:37. Huskies 7–0. Drive: 5 plays, 62 yards, 2:20.

Second quarter

- WASH – Peyton Henry 26-yard field goal, 11:45. Huskies 10–0. Drive: 7 plays, 61 yards, 3:02.
- UCLA – Theo Howard 9-yard pass from Dorian Thompson (J.J. Molson Kick), 9:47. Huskies 10–7. Drive: 6 plays, 75 yards, 1:58.
- WASH – Myles Gaskin 1-yard run (Peyton Henry Kick), 4:42. Huskies 17–7. Drive: 11 plays, 74 yards, 5:05.
- WASH – Jake Browning 1-yard run (Peyton Henry Kick), 0:33. Huskies 24–7. Drive: 10 plays, 77 yards, 3:19.

Third quarter

- UCLA – J.J. Molson 49-yard field goal, 9:46. Huskies 24–10. Drive: 12 plays, 42 yards, 5:14.

Fourth quarter

- UCLA – Caleb Wilson 9-yard pass from Dorian Thompson (J.J. Molson Kick), 14:53. Huskies 24–17. Drive: 17 plays, 90 yards, 6:01.
- WASH – Myles Gaskin 2-yard run (Peyton Henry Kick), 3:42. Huskies 31–17. Drive: 12 plays, 81 yards, 6:45.
- UCLA – Joshua Kelley 2-yard run (J.J. Molson Kick), 1:38. Huskies 31–24. Drive: 9 plays, 75 yards, 2:04.

Top passers

- UW – Jake Browning: 18/26, 265 yards, one touchdown, one interception
- UCLA – Dorian Thompson-Robinson: 27/38, 272 yards, two touchdowns, one interception

Top rushers

- UW – Myles Gaskin: 27 attempts, 116 yards, two touchdowns
- UCLA – Joshua Kelley: 20 attempts, 125 yards, one touchdown

Top receiving

- UW – Aaron Fuller: 5 receptions, 100 yards, one touchdown
- UCLA – Caleb Wilson: 8 receptions, 102 yards, one touchdown

=== At Oregon ===
Washington at Oregon – Game summary

Quarter	1	2	3	4	OT	Total
No. 7 Washington	10	7	7	0	3	27
No. 17 Oregon	10	7	7	0	6	30

at Autzen Stadium • Eugene, OR

- Date: October 13, 2018
- Game time: 12:30 PDT
- Game weather: 55 °F (13 °C) • Sunny • Wind N @ 8 mph (13 km/h)
- Game attendance: 58,691
- Referee: Kevin Mar
- TV announcers (ABC/ESPN2): Sean McDonough, Todd Blackledge, and Holly Rowe

Game information

Top passers

- UW – Jake Browning: 15/25, 243 yards, one touchdown, one interception
- UO – Justin Herbert: 18/32, 202 yards, two touchdowns

Top rushers

- UW – Myles Gaskin: 15 attempts, 69 yards
- UO – C. J. Verdell: 29 attempts, 111 yards, two touchdowns

Top receiving

- UW – Drew Sample: 4 receptions, 79 yards
- UO – Dillon Mitchell: 8 receptions, 119 yards

=== Colorado ===
Colorado at Washington – Game summary

Quarter	1	2	3	4	Total
Colorado	7	6	0	0	13
No. 15 Washington	0	14	3	10	27

at Husky Stadium • Seattle, WA

- Date: October 20, 2018
- Game time: 12:30 pm PDT
- Game weather: 53 °F (12 °C) • Overcast • Wind N @ 3 mph (5 km/h)
- Game attendance: 68,798
- Referee: Chris Coyte
- TV announcers (FOX): Joe Davis, Brady Quinn, and Bruce Feldman

Game information

Top passers

- CU – Steven Montez: 17/28, 144 yards, one touchdown, one interception
- UW – Jake Browning: 15/25, 150 yards, one touchdown, one interception

Top rushers

- CU – Travon McMillian: 25 attempts, 86 yards
- UW – Salvon Ahmed: 9 attempts, 73 yards, one touchdown

Top receiving

- CU – Daniel Arias: one reception, 37 yards, one touchdown
- UW – Aaron Fuller: 5 receptions, 63 yards, one touchdown

=== At California ===
Washington at California – Game summary

Quarter	1	2	3	4	Total
No. 15 Washington	7	0	0	3	10
California	3	3	6	0	12

at California Memorial Stadium • Berkeley, CA

- Date: October 27, 2018
- Game time: 3:30 pm PDT
- Game weather: 72 °F (22 °C) and clear
- Game attendance: 39,138
- Referee: Mark Duddy
- TV announcers (FS1): Tim Brando, Spencer Tillman, and Holly Sonders

Game information

First quarter

- WASH – Ty Jones 3-yard pass from Jake Browning (Peyton Henry Kick), 7:40. Huskies 7–0. Drive: 14 plays, 64 yards, 6:22.
- CAL – Greg Thomas 23-yard field goal, 5:09. Huskies 7–3. Drive: 6 plays, 36 yards, 2:22.

Second quarter

- CAL – Greg Thomas 35-yard field goal, 6:38. Huskies 7–6. Drive: 14 plays, 62 yards, 6:49.

Third quarter

- CAL – Evan Weaver 37-yard interception return, 0:01. Golden Bears 12–7. Drive: 5 plays, 14 yards, 1:55.

Fourth quarter

- WASH – Peyton Henry 26-yard field goal, 4:51. Golden Bears 12–10. Drive: 6 plays, 13 yards, 2:05.

Top passers

- UW – Jake Browning: 11/21, 148 yards, one touchdown, one interception
- CAL – Chase Garbers: 16/23, 153 yards

Top rushers

- UW – Kamari Pleasant: 12 attempts, 62 yards
- CAL – Patrick Laird: 22 attempts, 83 yards

Top receiving

- UW – Ty Jones: 3 receptions, 50 yards, one touchdown
- CAL – Vic Wharton III: 5 receptions, 45 yards

=== Stanford ===
Stanford at Washington – Game summary

Quarter	1	2	3	4	Total
Stanford	0	0	14	9	23
Washington	14	7	3	3	27

at Husky Stadium • Seattle, WA

- Date: November 3, 2018
- Game time: 6:00 pm PDT
- Game weather: 54 °F (12 °C) and overcast
- Game attendance: 69,690
- Referee: Steven Strimling
- TV: Roxy Bernstein, Anthony Herron, and Lewis Johnson

Game information

First quarter

- UW – Jake Browning 2-yard run (Peyton Henry kick), 8:09. UW 7–0. Drive: 8 plays, 73 yards, 4:44.
- UW – Drew Sample 11-yard pass from Jake Browning (Peyton Henry kick), 0:55. UW 14–0. Drive: 14 plays, 80 yards, 5:30.

Second quarter

- UW – Myles Gaskin 6-yard run (Peyton Henry kick), 12:20. UW 21–0. Drive: 6 plays, 26 yards, 2:31.

Third quarter

- STAN – Kaden Smith 14-yard pass from K. J. Costello (Collin Riccitelli kick), 9:43. UW 21–7. Drive: 8 plays, 61 yards, 4:27.
- UW – Peyton Henry 22-yard field goal, 4:27. UW 24–7. Drive: 10 plays, 70 yards, 5:16.
- STAN – Bryce Love 5-yard run (Collin Riccitelli kick), 1:55. UW 24–14. Drive: 6 plays, 67 yards, 2:28.

Fourth quarter

- STAN – Collin Riccitelli 21-yard field goal, 9:00. UW 24–17. Drive: 5 plays, 30 yards, 2:55.
- UW – Peyton Henry 38-yard field goal, 5:09. UW 27–17. Drive: 9 plays, 54 yards, 3:51.
- STAN – Trenton Irwin 33-yard pass from K. J. Costello (Collin Riccitelli PAT failed), 3:24. UW 27–23. Drive: 6 plays, 80 yards, 1:39.

Top passers

- SU – K. J. Costello: 29/43, 347 yards, two touchdowns, three interceptions
- UW – Jake Browning: 16/27, 194 yards, one touchdown

Top rushers

- SU – Bryce Love: 18 attempts, 71 yards, one touchdown
- UW – Myles Gaskin: 28 attempts, 148 yards, one touchdown

Top receiving

- SU – Kaden Smith: 8 receptions, 107 yards, one touchdown
- UW – Aaron Fuller: 5 receptions, 62 yards

=== Oregon State ===
Oregon State at Washington – Game summary

Quarter	1	2	3	4	Total
Oregon State	3	13	0	7	23
No. 17 Washington	28	7	7	0	42

at Husky Stadium • Seattle, WA

- Date: November 17, 2018
- Game time: 1:30 p.m. PST
- Game weather: 51 °F (11 °C), clear and dry
- Game attendance: 66,469
- Referee: Michael Mothershed
- TV announcers (P12N): Ted Robinson, Yogi Roth, and Jill Savage

Game information

Top passers

- OSU – Jake Luton: 18/32, 190 yards, one touchdown
- UW – Jake Browning: 17/23, 242 yards, three touchdowns

Top rushers

- OSU – Jermar Jefferson: 19 attempts, 115 yards
- UW – Myles Gaskin: 18 attempts, 135 yards, one touchdown

Top receiving

- OSU – Trevon Bradford: 4 receptions, 62 yards
- UW – Cade Otton: 3 receptions, 55 yards, one touchdown & Hunter Bryant: 2 receptions, 55 yards

=== At Washington State ===
111th Apple Cup – Game summary

Quarter	1	2	3	4	Total
No. 16 Washington	7	7	6	8	28
No. 7 Washington State	0	7	8	0	15

at Martin Stadium • Pullman, WA

- Date: November 23, 2018
- Game time: 5:30 p.m. PST
- Game weather: 37 °F (3 °C) rain, rain mixed with snow, snow
- Game attendance: 32,952
- Referee: Steve Strimling
- TV announcers (FOX): Joe Davis, Brady Quinn, Bruce Feldman, Dean Blandino

Game information

First quarter

- WASH – Myles Gaskin 5 yard run (Peyton Henry kick), 0:08 (WASH 7–0)

Second quarter

- WASH – Myles Gaskin 5 yard run (Peyton Henry kick), 5:37 (WASH 14–0)
- WSU – James Williams 11 yard run (Blake Mazza kick), 0:33 (WASH 14–7)

Third quarter

- WASH – Hunter Bryant 22 yard pass from Aaron Fuller (Peyton Henry kick blocked), 12:40 (WASH 20–7)
- WSU – Hunter Dale PAT return, 12:40 (WASH 20–9)
- WSU – James Williams 1 yard run (Gardner Minshew pass failed), 4:44 (WASH 20–15)

Fourth quarter

- WASH – Myles Gaskin 80 yard run (Salvon Ahmed rush), 12:30 (WASH 28–15)

Top passers

- UW – Jake Browning: 11/14, 207 yards, one interception
- WSU – Gardner Minshew: 26/35, 152 yards, two interceptions

Top rushers

- UW – Myles Gaskin: 27 attempts, 170 yards, three touchdowns
- WSU – James Williams: 11 attempts, 65 yards, two touchdowns

Top receiving

- UW – Hunter Bryant: 3 receptions, 108 yards, one touchdown
- WSU – Max Borghi: 7 receptions, 49 yards

=== Pac-12 Championship Game vs Utah ===
Washington vs Utah – Game summary

Quarter	1	2	3	4	Total
No. 17 Utah	0	0	3	0	3
No. 10 Washington	0	3	7	0	10

at Levi's Stadium • Santa Clara, California

- Date: November 30, 2018
- Game time: 5:00 p.m. PST
- Game attendance: 35,134
- Referee: Chris Coyte
- TV announcers (FOX): Joe Davis, Brady Quinn, Petros Papadakis, and Bruce Feldman.

Game information

First quarter

No scoring plays

Second quarter

- (3:08) WASH – Peyton Henry 29-yard field goal (Drive: 12 plays, 44 yards, 6:12; Washington 3–0)

Third quarter

- (11:17) UTAH – Matt Gay 53-yard field goal (Drive: 10 plays, 46 yards, 3:43; Tied 3–3)
- (1:05) WASH – Byron Murphy 66-yard interception return, Peyton Henry kick (Washington 10–3)

Fourth quarter

No scoring plays

Top passers

- UW – Jake Browning: 21/33, 187 yards, one interception
- UU – Jason Shelley: 17/27, 137 yards, three interceptions

Top rushers

- UW – Myles Gaskin: 23 attempts, 71 yards
- UU – Armand Shyne: 11 attempts, 37 yards

Top receiving

- UW – Andre Baccellia: 8 receptions, 65 yards
- UU – Jaylen Dixon: 7 receptions, 68 yards

=== 2019 Rose Bowl vs Ohio State ===
Washington vs Ohio State – Game summary

Quarter	1	2	3	4	Total
No. 9 Washington	3	0	0	20	23
No. 5 Ohio State	7	14	7	0	28

at Rose Bowl • Pasadena, California

- Date: January 1, 2019
- Game time: 2:00 p.m. PST
- Game weather: Sunny • 60 °F (16 °C) • Wind 6 miles per hour (9.7 km/h; 5.2 kn) N
- Game attendance: 91,853
- Referee: John McDaid
- TV announcers (ESPN): Chris Fowler, Kirk Herbstreit, Maria Taylor and Tom Rinaldi

Game information

First quarter

- (9:04) OSU – Parris Campbell 12-yard reception from Dwayne Haskins, Blake Haubeil kick (Drive: 11 plays, 77 yards, 2:45; Ohio State 7–0)
- (1:19) WASH – Peyton Henry 38-yard field goal (Drive: 11 plays, 55 yards, 4:57; Ohio State 7–3)

Second quarter

- (12:23) OSU – Johnnie Dixon 19-yard reception from Dwayne Haskins, Blake Haubeil kick (Drive: 10 plays, 75 yards, 3:56; Ohio State 14–3)
- (0:14) OSU – Rashod Berry 1-yard reception from Dwayne Haskins, Blake Haubeil kick (Drive: 5 plays, 57 yards, 0:46; Ohio State 21–3)

Third quarter

- (8:23) OSU – J. K. Dobbins 3-yard run, Blake Haubeil kick (Drive: 7 plays, 80 yards, 2:02; Ohio State 28–3)

Fourth quarter

- (12:17) WASH – Drew Sample 2-yard reception from Myles Gaskin, Peyton Henry kick (Drive: 10 plays, 66 yards, 4:38; Ohio State 28–10)
- (6:42) WASH – Myles Gaskin 1-yard run, Peyton Henry kick (Drive: 5 plays, 66 yards, 1:30; Ohio State 28–17)
- (0:42) WASH – Myles Gaskin 2-yard run, 2-point pass failed (Drive: 10 plays, 71 yards, 2:08; Ohio State 28–23)

Top passers

- UW – Jake Browning – 35-54, 313 yards
- OSU – Dwayne Haskins – 25-37, 251 yards, 3 TD

Top rushers

- UW – Myles Gaskin – 24 carries, 121 yards, 2 TD
- OSU – Mike Weber – 15 carries, 96 yards

Top receiving

- UW – Andre Baccellia – 12 receptions, 109 yards
- OSU – Parris Campbell – 11 receptions, 71 yards, 1 TD

== Awards and honors ==
=== Pac-12 Player of the Week ===
Week	Player	Opponent	Position	Ref
3	Ben Burr-Kirven	Utah	Defense	
4	Ben Burr-Kirven	Arizona State	Defense	
13	Myles Gaskin	Washington State	Offense	

=== Reveal Suits National Team of the Week ===
Weekend of November 24

=== Dodd Trophy Coach of the Week ===
Week	Coach	Opponent	Ref
13	Chris Petersen	Washington State	

Pac-12 Pat Tillman Defensive Player of the Year: Ben Burr-Kirven

== Postseason ==
=== NFL Scouting Combine ===
Nine members of the 2018 team were invited to participate in drills at the 2019 NFL Scouting Combine held between February 26 and March 4, 2019, at Lucas Oil Stadium in Indianapolis, Indiana.

#	Name	POS	HT	WT	Arms	Hands	40	Bench press	Vert jump	Broad jump	3-cone drill	20-yd shuttle	60-yd shuttle	Ref
QB01	Jake Browning	QB	6'2"	211	32 1/2"	9"	4.74	–	29"	112"	7.19	4.44	–	
LB08	Ben Burr-Kirven	LB	6'0"	230	31 7/8"	8 7/8"	4.56	21 reps	34.5"	121"	6.85	4.09	11.43	
DL04	Greg Gaines	DL	6'1"	312	31 1/4"	9 5/8"	5.16	30 reps	31"	109"	–	–	–	
RB05	Myles Gaskin	RB	5'9"	205	29 1/2"	8 3/4"	4.58	24 reps	35.5"	118"	7.19	4.27	11.77	
OL38	Kaleb McGary	T	6'7"	317	32 7/8"	10 1/8"	5.05	23 reps	33.5"	111"	7.66	4.58	–	
DB24	Jordan Miller	CB	6'1"	186	32 7/8"	9 5/8"	4.49	6 reps	37"	125"	–	–	–	
DB26	Byron Murphy	CB	5'11"	190	30 1/8"	8 7/8"	4.45	14 reps	36.5"	120"	–	–	–	
DB54	Taylor Rapp	S	6'0"	208	30 3/4"	9"	–	17 reps	35"	115"	6.82	3.99	11.33	
TE14	Drew Sample	TE	6'5"	255	33 3/8"	9 5/8"	4.71	–	33.5"	115"	7.15	4.31	11.85	

* Top position performer

=== NFL draft ===
The following Washington players were either selected or signed as undrafted free agents following the draft.

Player	Position	Round	Overall	NFL team
Kaleb McGary	OT	1	31	Atlanta Falcons
Byron Murphy	CB	2	33	Arizona Cardinals
Drew Sample	TE	2	52	Cincinnati Bengals
Taylor Rapp	S	2	61	Los Angeles Rams
Greg Gaines	DT	4	134	Los Angeles Rams
Ben Burr-Kirven	LB	5	142	Seattle Seahawks
Jordan Miller	CB	5	172	Atlanta Falcons
Myles Gaskin	RB	7	234	Miami Dolphins
Shane Bowman	DL	UDFA		Jacksonville Jaguars
Jake Browning	QB	UDFA		Minnesota Vikings
Jaylen Johnson	DL	UDFA		Denver Broncos
JoJo McIntosh	S	UDFA		Washington Redskins
