= 2019 Washington Huskies football team =

American college football season

2019 Washington Huskies football

Las Vegas Bowl champion

Las Vegas Bowl, W 38–7 vs. Boise State
- Conference: Pac-12 Conference
- North Division
- Record: 8–5 (4–5 Pac-12)
- Head coach: Chris Petersen (6th season)
- Offensive coordinator: Bush Hamdan (2nd season)
- Offensive scheme: Spread
- Defensive coordinator: Jimmy Lake (4th season)
- Co-defensive coordinator: Pete Kwiatkowski (6th season)
- Base defense: 3–4
- Home stadium: Husky Stadium

Uniform
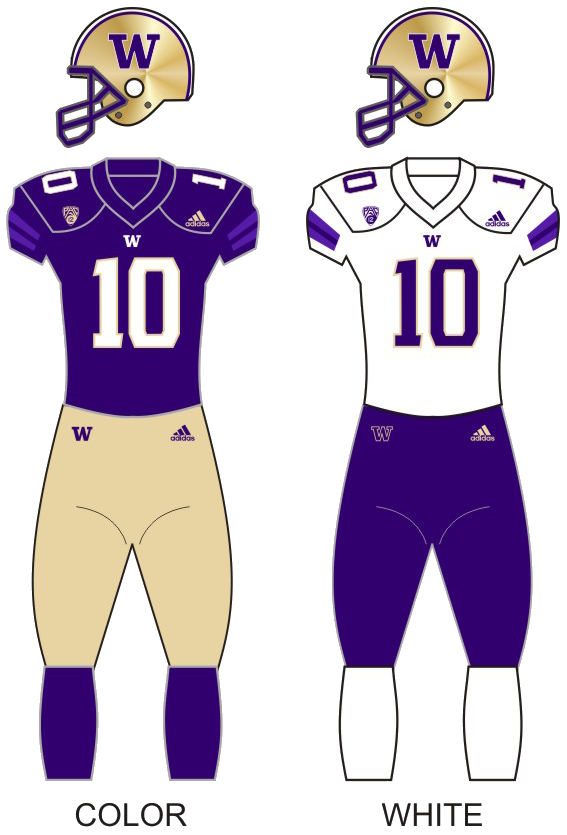

2019 Pac-12 Conference football standings
	Conf.			Overall
Team	W		L	W		L
North Division
No. 5 Oregon xy$	8	–	1	12	–	2
California	4	–	5	8	–	5
Washington	4	–	5	8	–	5
Oregon State	4	–	5	5	–	7
Washington State	3	–	6	6	–	7
Stanford	3	–	6	4	–	8
South Division
No. 16 Utah xy	8	–	1	11	–	3
USC	7	–	2	8	–	5
Arizona State	4	–	5	8	–	5
UCLA	4	–	5	4	–	8
Colorado	3	–	6	5	–	7
Arizona	2	–	7	4	–	8
Championship: Oregon 37, Utah 15
$ – Conference champion; x – Division champion/co-champions; y – Championship game participant; Rankings from AP Poll

The 2019 Washington Huskies football team represented the University of Washington during the 2019 NCAA Division I FBS football season. The Huskies were led by head coach Chris Petersen, in his sixth and final year as head coach. The team looked to improve upon its 10–4 record from 2018. After the regular season, Petersen announced that the team's postseason bowl game, the Las Vegas Bowl, would be his final game with the Huskies. Respected defensive coordinator Jimmy Lake would take over the reins after the Las Vegas Bowl, firing two offensive coordinators within 24 hours. They played their home games at Husky Stadium in Seattle, competing as a member of the North Division in the Pac-12 Conference.

== Preseason ==
=== Coaching changes ===
Matt Lubick, who served as wide receivers coach and co-offensive coordinator in the previous two seasons, resigned in January 2019. He indicated he was leaving the coaching profession entirely. On January 17, 2019, Washington announced it had hired Junior Adams to replace Lubick as wide receivers coach.

=== Recruiting ===
Washington's 2019 recruiting class consisted of 23 recruits. The class was ranked as the 16th best in the country and the second-best in the Pac-12 Conference behind Oregon according to the 247Sports.com Composite.

=== Pac-12 media day ===
==== Pac-12 media poll ====
In the Pac-12 preseason media poll, Washington was predicted to finish in second place in the North Division, receiving one fewer vote than Oregon. The Huskies finished with the third-most votes to win the Pac-12 Championship Game.

== Schedule ==
Washington's 2019 schedule began with a home non-conference game against Eastern Washington of the Big Sky Conference. Washington's two other non-conference games were against Hawaii of the Mountain West Conference at home, and a road game against BYU, a football independent. In Pac-12 Conference play, the Huskies played the other members of the North Division and drew Arizona, Colorado, USC, and Utah from the South Division.

Date	Time	Opponent	Rank	Site	TV	Result	Attendance
August 31	12:00 p.m.	No. 4 (FCS) Eastern Washington*	No. 13	Husky Stadium; Seattle, WA	P12N	W 47–14	65,709
September 7	7:30 p.m.	California	No. 14	Husky Stadium; Seattle, WA	FS1	L 19–20	66,327
September 14	4:30 p.m.	Hawaii*	No. 23	Husky Stadium; Seattle, WA	P12N	W 52–20	67,589
September 21	12:30 p.m.	at BYU*	No. 22	LaVell Edwards Stadium; Provo, UT	ABC/ESPN2	W 45–19	62,117
September 28	12:30 p.m.	No. 21 USC	No. 17	Husky Stadium; Seattle, WA	FOX	W 28–14	66,975
October 5	7:30 p.m.	at Stanford	No. 15	Stanford Stadium; Stanford, CA	ESPN	L 13–23	33,225
October 12	8:00 p.m.	at Arizona		Arizona Stadium; Tucson, AZ	FS1	W 51–27	47,933
October 19	12:30 p.m.	No. 12 Oregon^{†}	No. 25	Husky Stadium; Seattle, WA (rivalry)	ABC	L 31–35	70,867
November 2	1:00 p.m.	No. 9 Utah		Husky Stadium; Seattle, WA	FOX	L 28–33	69,270
November 8	7:30 p.m.	at Oregon State		Reser Stadium; Corvallis, OR	FS1	W 19–7	34,244
November 23	7:00 p.m.	at Colorado		Folsom Field; Boulder, CO	ESPN	L 14–20	44,618
November 29	1:00 p.m.	Washington State		Husky Stadium; Seattle, WA (Apple Cup)	FOX	W 31–13	70,931
December 21	4:30 p.m.	vs. No. 19 Boise State*		Sam Boyd Stadium; Whitney, NV (Las Vegas Bowl)	ABC	W 38–7	34,197
*Non-conference game; ^{†}Homecoming; Rankings from AP Poll and CFP Rankings after November 5 released prior to game; All times are in Pacific time; Source:

== Rankings ==
Ranking movements Legend: ██ Increase in ranking ██ Decrease in ranking — = Not ranked RV = Received votes
	Week																
Poll	Pre	1	2	3	4	5	6	7	8	9	10	11	12	13	14	15	Final
AP	13	14	23	22	17	15	RV	25	RV	RV	—	—	—	—	RV	RV	RV
Coaches	12	12	21	21	17	16	RV	23	RV	RV	—	—	—	—	—	—	RV
CFP	Not released										—	—	—	—	—	—	Not released

== Personnel ==
=== Coaching staff ===
Name	Position	Alma mater
Jimmy Lake	Defensive coordinator/defensive backs coach	Eastern Washington (2000)
Junior Adams	Wide receivers coach	Montana State (2004)
Bush Hamdan	Offensive coordinator/quarterbacks coach	Boise State (2008)
Will Harris	Assistant defensive backs coach	USC (2009)
Keith Bhonapha	Recruiting coordinator/running backs coach	Hawai'i (2003)
Bob Gregory	Assistant head coach/inside linebackers coach/special teams coordinator	Washington State (1987)
Scott Huff	Offensive line coach/Run game coordinator	Boise State (2002)
Pete Kwiatkowski	Co-defensive coordinator/Outside linebackers coach	Boise State (1990)
Ikaika Malloe	Defensive line coach	Washington (1997)
Jordan Paopao	Tight ends coach	San Diego (2006)
Tim Socha	Strength & conditioning coach	Minnesota (1999)

=== Roster ===
2019 Washington Huskies football roster
Quarterback: 10 Jacob Eason – (redshirt) junior (6'6, 227); 11 Jacob Sirmon – (redshirt) freshman (6'5, 234); 14 Blake Gregory – (redshirt) junior (6'2, 185); 16 Dylan Morris – freshman (6'0, 196); Tailback: 22 Cameron Davis – freshman (6'0, 197); 24 Kamari Pleasant – (redshirt) junior (6'0, 213); 25 Sean McGrew – (redshirt) junior (5'7, 186); 26 Salvon Ahmed – junior (5'11, 196); 28 Richard Newton – (redshirt) freshman (6'0, 210); 36 Malik Braxton – senior (5'10, 207); 38 Camden Verstrate – freshman (5'9, 167); Wide receiver: 2 Aaron Fuller – senior (5'11, 188); 4 Terrell Bynum – (redshirt) sophomore (6'1, 189); 5 Andre Baccellia – (redshirt) senior (5'10, 175); 6 Chico McClatcher – Senior (5'8, 183); 7 Trey Lowe – (redshirt) freshman (5'8, 182); 8 Marquis Spiker – (redshirt) freshman (6'3, 193); 15 Puka Nacua – freshman (6'1, 204); 17 Taj Davis – freshman (6'1, 195); 18 Austin Osborne – (redshirt) freshman (6'2, 199); 20 Ty Jones – junior (6'4, 213); 21 Quinten Pounds – (redshirt) senior (6'0, 176); 30 David Pritchard – (redshirt) freshman (6'0, 172); 82 Jordan Chin – (redshirt) junior (6'0, 174); 85 Fatu Sua-Godinet – (redshirt) junior (5'11, 190); Tight end: 1 Hunter Bryant – junior (6'2, 239); 37 Jack Westover – (redshirt) freshman (6'3, 241); 39 Zeke Pelluer – freshman (6'4, 246); 42 Carson Smith – freshman (6'4, 236); 47 Corey Luciano – (redshirt) sophomore (6'4, 268); 83 Devin Culp – (redshirt) freshman (6'3, 262); 86 Jacob Kizer – junior (6'5, 254); 87 Cade Otton – (redshirt) sophomore (6'5, 246)	Offensive line: 51 Jaxson Kirkland – (redshirt) sophomore (6'7, 323); 55 Troy Fautanu – freshman (6'5, 295); 56 Nick Harris – senior (6'1, 302); 59 Henry Roberts – (redshirt) senior (6'6, 395); 62 Noah Hellyer – (redshirt) freshman (6'1, 259); 63 Cole Norgaard – (redshirt) freshman (6'5, 284); 66 Henry Bainivalu – (redshirt) sophomore (6'6, 326); 67 Chase Skuza – (redshirt) sophomore (6'6, 307); 68 M.J. Ale – (redshirt) freshman (6'6, 352); 69 Will Pliska – (redshirt) freshman (6'5, 289); 70 Jared Hilbers – (redshirt) senior (6'7, 316); 71 Nate Kalepo – freshman (6'6, 346); 72 Trey Adams – (redshirt) senior (6'8, 314); 73 Gage Harty – (redshirt) freshman (6'4, 279); 76 Luke Wattenberg – (redshirt) junior (6'5, 300); 77 Julius Buelow – freshman (6'8, 342); 78 Matteo Mele – (redshirt) freshman (6'5, 305); 79 Victor Curne – (redshirt) freshman (6'3, 320); Defensive line: 8 Benning Potoa'e – (redshirt) senior (6'3, 290); 50 Sama Paama – freshman (6'4, 347); 57 John Clark – (redshirt) senior (6'4, 289); 59 Draco Bynum – (redshirt) freshman (6'4, 268); 90 Josiah Bronson – (redshirt) senior (6'3, 291); 91 Tuli Letuligasenoa – (redshirt) freshman (6'2, 318); 92 Noa Ngalu – freshman (6'1, 292); 94 Sam Taimani – (redshirt) freshman (6'2, 321); 95 Levi Onwuzurike – (redshirt) junior (6'3, 293); 96 Jacob Bandes – freshman (6'2, 313); 99 Faatui Tuitele – freshman (6'3, 300); Long snapper: 49 A.J. Carty – (redshirt) senior (6'3, 243); 78 Luke Lane – (redshirt) junior (6'0, 202); Placekicker: 37 Tim Horn – freshman (6'2, 211); 42 Van Soderberg – (redshirt) junior (6'0, 200); 47 Peyton Henry – (redshirt) sophomore (5'11, 197); Punter: 32 Joel Whitford – (redshirt) senior (6'3, 209); 46 Race Porter – (redshirt) junior (6'2, 183)	Inside linebacker: 10 Miki Ah You – freshman (6'1, 215); 13 Brandon Wellington – senior (6'0, 226); 14 Josh Calvert – freshman (6'2, 223); 15 Daniel Heimuli – freshman (6'0, 217); 28 Ruperake Fuavai – freshman (6'2, 230); 30 Kyler Manu – (redshirt) senior (6'1, 246); 35 Ben Hines – (redshirt) freshman (5'10, 234); 40 Alphonzo Tuputala – freshman (6'2, 224); 43 Jackson Sirmon – (redshirt) freshman (6'3, 238); 48 Edefuan Ulofoshio – (redshirt) freshman (6'0, 231); 50 M.J. Tafisi – (redshirt) freshman (6'0, 235); 54 Drew Fowler – freshman (6'1, 210); Outside linebacker: 9 Joe Tryon-Shoyinka – (redshirt) sophomore (6'5, 262); 41 Myles Rice – (redshirt) junior (6'3, 250); 45 Bralen Trice – freshman (6'3, 236); 52 Ariel Ngata – (redshirt) sophomore (6'3, 213); 55 Ryan Bowman – (redshirt) junior (6'0, 277); 56 Laiatu Latu – freshman (6'4, 275); 58 Zion Tupuola-Fetui – (redshirt) freshman (6'3, 253); 93 Hunter Hansen – freshman (6'4, 191); Defensive back: 3 Elijah Molden – junior (5'10, 190); 5 Myles Bryant – senior (5'9, 185); 11 Alex Cook – (redshirt) sophomore (6'1, 203); 16 Cameron Williams – freshman (6'0, 191); 18 Isaiah Gilchrist – (redshirt) junior (5'11, 208); 19 Kyler Gordon – (redshirt) freshman (6'0, 190); 20 Asa Turner – freshman (6'3, 187); 21 Dominique Hampton – (redshirt) freshman (6'2, 208); 22 Trent McDuffie – freshman (5'11, 185); 23 Brandon McKinney – junior (6'0, 201); 27 Keith Taylor – junior (6'3, 195); 29 Julius Irvin – (redshirt) freshman (6'1, 191); 31 Kamren Fabiculanan – freshman (6'1, 181); 34 Mishael Powell – freshman (6'1, 204); 36 Dustin Bush – (redshirt) senior (5'9, 183); 38 Zechariah Brown – (redshirt) sophomore (5'10, 195); 39 Nick Juran – freshman (6'0, 194)

== Game summaries ==
=== Eastern Washington ===
Eastern Washington at Washington – Game summary

Quarter	1	2	3	4	Total
No. 4 (FCS) Eagles	0	7	0	7	14
No. 13 Huskies	21	7	14	5	47

at Husky Stadium • Seattle, WA

- Date: August 31, 2019
- Game time: 12:00 p.m. PDT
- Game weather: 74 °F (23 °C) • Hazy • Wind @ 0 mph (0 km/h)
- Game attendance: 65,709
- Referee: Kevin Mar
- TV announcers (P12N): Ted Robinson, Yogi Roth, and Lewis Johnson

Game information

Top passers

- EWU – Eric Barriere: 21/35, 211 yards, one touchdown
- UW – Jacob Eason: 27/36, 349 yards, four touchdowns

Top rushers

- EWU – Dennis Merritt: 5 attempts, 37 yards
- UW – Richard Newton: 12 attempts, 91 yards, one touchdown

Top receiving

- EWU – Andrew Boston: 6 receptions, 112 yards, one touchdown
- UW – Andre Baccellia: 5 receptions, 84 yards, one touchdown

=== California ===
California at Washington – Game summary

Quarter	1	2	3	4	Total
Golden Bears	0	3	14	3	20
No. 14 Huskies	0	10	3	6	19

at Husky Stadium • Seattle, WA

- Date: September 7, 2019
- Game time: 7:30 p.m. PDT
- Game weather: 68 °F (20 °C) • Cloudy (Lightning) • Wind @ 0 mph (0 km/h)
- Game attendance: 66,327
- Referee: Michael Mothershed
- TV: FS1

Game information

Top passers

- CAL – Chase Garbers: 11/18, 111 yards
- UW – Jacob Eason: 18/31, 162 yards, one interception

Top rushers

- CAL – Christopher Brown Jr.: 16 attempts, 80 yards
- UW – Salvon Ahmed: 21 attempts, 119 yards, one touchdown

Top receiving

- CAL – Kekoa Crawford: 3 receptions, 48 yards
- UW – Hunter Bryant: 4 receptions, 40 yards; Aaron Fuller: 3 receptions, 40 yards

=== Hawaii ===
Hawaii at Washington – Game summary

Quarter	1	2	3	4	Total
Rainbow Warriors	0	7	13	0	20
No. 23 Huskies	21	17	0	14	52

at Husky Stadium • Seattle, WA

- Date: September 14, 2019
- Game time: 4:30 p.m. PDT
- Game weather: 66 °F (19 °C) • Cloudy • Wind @ 9 mph (14 km/h)
- Game attendance: 67,589
- Referee: Mike McCabe
- TV announcers (P12N): Ted Robinson, Yogi Roth, and Lewis Johnson

Game information

Top passers

- HI – Cole McDonald: 22/35, 218 yards, one touchdown, three interceptions
- UW – Jacob Eason: 18/25, 262 yards, three touchdowns

Top rushers

- HI – Miles Reed: 15 attempts, 70 yards, two touchdowns
- UW – Salvon Ahmed: 8 attempts, 83 yards

Top receiving

- HI – Cedric Byrd II: 6 receptions, 72 yards
- UW – Hunter Bryant: 5 receptions, 115 yards, one touchdown

=== At BYU ===
Washington at Brigham Young – Game summary

Quarter	1	2	3	4	Total
No. 22 Huskies	21	3	21	0	45
Cougars	3	9	7	0	19

at LaVell Edwards Stadium • Provo, Utah

- Date: September 21, 2019
- Game time: 12:30 pm PDT
- Game weather: 61 °F (16 °C) • Partly cloudy • Wind @ 0 mph (0 km/h)
- Game attendance: 62,117
- Referee: Steve Strimling
- TV announcers (ABC): Steve Levy, Brian Griese, Todd McShay, and Molly McGrath

Game information

First quarter

- (12:10) WASH – Richard Newton 17-yard reception from Jacob Eason, Peyton Henry kick (Drive: 8 plays, 75 yards, 2:50; Washington 7–0)
- (9:31) BYU – Jake Oldroyd 43-yard field goal (Drive: 8 plays, 50 yards, 2:39; Washington 7–3)
- (3:50) WASH – Aaron Fuller 17-yard receptions from Jacob Eason, Peyton Henry kick (Drive: 10 plays, 75 yards, 5:41; Washington 14–3)
- (2:17) WASH – Brandon Wellington 69-yard fumble recovery returned, Peyton Henry kick (Washington 21–3)

Second quarter

- (11:00) WASH – Peyton Henry 30-yard field goal (Drive: 8 plays, 61 yards, 3:15; Washington 24–3)
- (8:22) BYU – Emmanuel Esukpa 1-yard run, Jake Oldroyd kick failed (Drive: 5 plays, 75 yards, 2:38; Washington 24–9)
- (0:26) BYU – Jake Oldroyd 54-yard field goal (Drive: 13 plays, 59 yards, 3:47; Washington 24–12)

Third quarter

- (12:28) WASH – Andre Baccellia 35-yard reception from Jacob Eason, Peyton Henry kick (Drive: 3 plays, 52 yards, 1:11; Washington 31–12)
- (10:37) WASH – Aaron Fuller 88-yard punt return, Peyton Henry kick (Washington 38–12)
- (5:22) WASH – Richard Newton 3-yard run, Peyton Henry kick (Drive: 8 plays, 85 yards, 3:57; Washington 45–12)
- (0:00) BYU – Matt Bushman 7-yard reception from Zach Wilson, Jake Oldroyd kick (Drive: 1 play, 7 yards, 0:02; Washington 45–19)

Fourth quarter

No scoring plays

Top passers

- BYU – Zach Wilson: 26/42, 277 yards, one touchdown, one interception
- UW – Jacob Eason: 24/28, 290 yards, three touchdowns, one interception

Top rushers

- BYU – Emmanuel Esukpa: 9 attempts, 51 yards, one touchdown
- UW – Sean McGrew: 18 attempts, 110 yards

Top receiving

- BYU – Matt Bushman: 6 receptions, 89 yards, one touchdown
- UW – Aaron Fuller: 8 receptions, 91 yards, one touchdown

Referee: Steven Strimling

=== USC ===
Southern Cal at Washington – Game summary

Quarter	1	2	3	4	Total
No. 21 Trojans	0	7	7	0	14
No. 17 Huskies	14	3	11	0	28

at Husky Stadium • Seattle, WA

- Date: September 28, 2019
- Game time: 12:30 p.m. PDT
- Game weather: 54 °F (12 °C) • Mostly cloudy • Wind @ 6 mph (10 km/h)
- Game attendance: 66,975
- Referee: Mark Duddy
- TV announcers (FOX): Joe Davis, Brock Huard, Bruce Feldman

Game information

First quarter

- UW (3:38) – #28 Richard Newton 1 yard run TD
  (#47 Peyton Henry kick) – UW 7–0
- UW (0:29) – #5 Andre Baccellia 0 yard fumble recovery TD
  (#47 Peyton Henry kick) – UW 14–0

Second quarter

- USC (4:14) – #19 Matt Fink 3 yard run TD
  (#40 Chase McGrath kick) – UW 14–7
- UW (0:00) – #47 Peyton Henry 28 yard Field Goal – UW 17–7

Third quarter

- UW (12:02) – #47 Peyton Henry 35 yard Field Goal – UW 20–7
- UW (4:56) – #26 Salvon Ahmed 89 yard run TD
  (2 pts conversion) – UW 28–7
- USC (2:10) – #19 Matt Fink to #6 Michael Pittman Jr. 44 yard pass TD
  (#40 Chase McGrath kick) – USC 28–14

Top passers

- USC – Matt Fink: 19/23, 163 yards, one touchdown, three interceptions
- UW – Jacob Eason: 16/26, 180 yards

Top rushers

- USC – Stephen Carr: 7 attempts, 94 yards
- UW – Salvon Ahmed: 17 attempts, 153 yards, one touchdown

Top receiving

- USC – Michael Pittman Jr.: 4 receptions, 64 yards, one touchdown
- UW – Aaron Fuller: 6 receptions, 68 yards

=== At Stanford ===
Washington at Stanford – Game summary

Quarter	1	2	3	4	Total
No. 15 Huskies	7	3	3	0	13
Cardinal	3	10	7	3	23

at Stanford Stadium • Stanford, CA

- Date: October 5, 2019
- Game time: 7:30 pm PDT
- Game attendance: 33,225
- Referee: Kevin Mar
- TV: ESPN

Game information

Top passers

- UW – Jacob Eason: 16/36, 206 yards, 1 touchdown, 1 interception
- STAN – Davis Mills: 21/30, 293 yards, 1 touchdown

Top rushers

- UW – Richard Newton: 10 rushes, 64 yards
- STAN – Cameron Scarlett: 33 rushes, 151 yards, 1 touchdown

Top receiving

- UW – Aaron Fuller: 9 receptions, 171 yards
- STAN – Simi Fehoko: 3 receptions, 91 yards, 1 touchdown

=== At Arizona ===
Washington at Arizona – Game summary

Quarter	1	2	3	4	Total
Huskies	6	7	14	24	51
Wildcats	0	17	0	10	27

at Arizona Stadium • Tucson, AZ

- Date: October 12, 2019
- Game time: 8:00 p.m. PDT
- Game weather: 77 °F (25 °C) • Clear • Wind @ 3 mph (5 km/h)
- Game attendance: 47,933
- Referee: Mike McCabe
- TV announcers (FS1): Tim Brando (play-by-play), Spencer Tillman (color), Coley Harvey (sideline)

Game information

First quarter

- (5:43) WASH – Peyton Henry 27-yard field goal (Drive: 8 plays, 62 yards, 3:36; Washington 3–0)
- (0:35) WASH – Peyton Henry 25-yard field goal (Drive: 4 plays, 0 yards, 1:47; Washington 6–0)

Second quarter

- (12:59) ARIZ – Lucas Havrisik 50-yard field goal (Drive: 4 plays, 8 yards, 1:15; Washington 6–3)
- (8:55) WASH – Brandon Wellington 5-yard fumble return, Peyton Henry kick (Washington 13–3)
- (5:31) ARIZ – Jamarye Joiner 40-yard pass from Khalil Tate, Lucas Havrisik kick (Drive: 9 plays, 75 yards, 3:24; Washington 13–10)
- (1:06) ARIZ – J.J. Taylor 1-yard run, Lucas Havrisik kick (Drive: 9 plays, 68 yards, 2:47; Arizona 17–13)

Third quarter

- (10:40) WASH – Jack Westover 3-yard pass from Jacob Eason, Peyton Henry kick (Drive: 10 plays, 75 yards, 4:20; Washington 20–17)
- (2:41) WASH – Salvon Ahmed 4-yard run, Peyton Henry kick (Drive: 6 plays, 36 yards, 3:02; Washington 27–17)

Fourth quarter

- (14:46) ARIZ – Lucas Havrisik 31-yard field goal (Drive: 9 plays, 62 yards, 2:55; Washington 27–20)
- (13:07) WASH – Aaron Fuller 22-yard pass from Jacob Eason, Peyton Henry kick (Drive: 4 plays, 75 yards, 1:39; Washington 34–20)
- (9:54) WASH – Salvon Ahmed 3-yard run, Peyton Henry kick (Drive: 5 plays, 63 yards, 2:15; Washington 41–20)
- (6:59) WASH – Peyton Henry 27-yard field goal (Drive: 5 plays, 20 yards, 2:48; Washington 44–20)
- (4:25) ARIZ – Nathan Tilford 25-yard run, Lucas Havrisik kick (Drive: 9 plays, 79 yards, 2:28; Washington 44–27)
- (2:12) WASH – Salvon Ahmed 10-yard run, Peyton Henry kick (Drive: 4 plays, 43 yards, 2:11; Washington 51–27)

Top passers

- AZ – Khalil Tate: 13/25, 184 yards, one touchdown, one interception
- UW – Jacob Eason: 15/22, 243 yards, two touchdowns

Top rushers

- AZ – J. J. Taylor: 18 attempts, 95 yards, one touchdown
- UW – Sean McGrew: 13 attempts, 106 yards

Top receiving

- AZ – Cedric Peterson: 3 receptions, 64 yards
- UW – Puka Nacua: 3 receptions, 97 yards

=== Oregon ===
Oregon at Washington – Game summary

Quarter	1	2	3	4	Total
No. 12 Ducks	7	7	14	7	35
No. 25 Huskies	7	14	10	0	31

at Husky Stadium • Seattle, WA

- Date: October 19, 2019
- Game time: 12:30 p.m. PDT
- Game attendance: 70,867
- TV: ABC

Game information

First quarter

- ORE – Spencer Webb 12 Yd pass from Justin Herbert (Camden Lewis Kick), 9:44. Oregon 7–0. Drive: 12 plays, 89 yards, 5:16.
- UW – Salvon Ahmed 9 Yd Run (Peyton Henry Kick), 0:20. Tied 7–7. Drive: 13 plays, 52 yards, 5:44.

Second quarter

- UW – Jordan Chin 48 Yd pass from Jacob Eason (Peyton Henry Kick), 12:48. Washington 14–7. Drive: 4 plays, 73 yards, 1:51.
- ORE – Jaylon Redd 16 Yd pass from Justin Herbert (Camden Lewis Kick), 2:59. Tied 14–14. Drive: 8 plays, 69 yards, 2:58.
- UW – Andre Baccellia 5 Yd pass from Jacob Eason (Peyton Henry Kick), 0:58. Washington 21–14. Drive: 8 plays, 75 yards, 2:01.

Third quarter

- UW – Puka Nacua 33 Yd pass from Jacob Eason (Peyton Henry Kick), 13:16. Washington 28–14. Drive: 4 plays, 74 yards, 1:44.
- ORE – Cyrus Habibi-Likio 14 Yd Run (Camden Lewis Kick), 8:36. Washington 28–21. Drive: 10 plays, 79 yards, 4:40.
- UW – Peyton Henry 30 Yd Field Goal, 3:39. Washington 31–21. Drive: 10 plays, 53 yards, 4:57.
- ORE – Mycah Pittman 36 Yd pass from Justin Herbert (Camden Lewis Kick), 0:00. Washington 31–28. Drive: 10 plays, 75 yards, 3:39.

Fourth quarter

- ORE – Jaylon Redd 5 Yd pass from Justin Herbert (Camden Lewis Kick), 5:10. Oregon 35–31. Drive: 8 plays, 70 yards, 3:26.

Top passers

- ORE – Justin Herbert – 24-38, 280 yards, 4 TD
- UW – Jacob Eason – 23-30, 289 yards, 3 TD

Top rushers

- ORE – Cyrus Habibi-Likio – 14 carries, 81 yards, 1 TD
- UW – Salvon Ahmed – 24 carries, 140 yards, 1 TD

Top receivers

- ORE – Johnny Johnson III – 5 receptions, 90 yards
- UW – Hunter Bryant – 3 receptions, 65 yards

=== Utah ===
Utah at Washington – Game summary

Quarter	1	2	3	4	Total
No. 9 Utes	0	13	6	14	33
Huskies	7	7	7	7	28

at Husky Stadium • Seattle, WA

- Date: November 2, 2019
- Game time: 1:00 p.m. PDT
- Game attendance: 69,270
- Referee: Mike McCabe
- TV announcers (FOX): Joe Davis, Brock Huard, Bruce Feldman

Game information

Top passers

- Utah – Tyler Huntley – 19/24, 284 yards, TD
- UW – Jacob Eason – 29/52, 316 yards, 4 TD, 2 INT

Top rushers

- Utah – Zack Moss – 27 carries, 100 yards, TD
- UW – Salvon Ahmed – 14 carries, 50 yards

Top receiving

- Utah – Jaylen Dixon – 2 receptions, 72 yards
- UW – Hunter Bryant – 6 receptions, 105 yards, 2 TD

=== At Oregon State ===
Washington at Oregon State – Game summary

Quarter	1	2	3	4	Total
Huskies	3	7	9	0	19
Beavers	0	0	7	0	7

at Reser Stadium • Corvallis, OR

- Date: November 8, 2019
- Game time: 7:30 p.m. PST
- Game attendance: 34,244
- TV: FS1

Game information

Top passers

- OSU – Jake Luton – 19-28, 88 yards, 1 INT
- UW – Jacob Eason – 16-32, 175 yards, 2 INT

Top rushers

- OSU – Jermar Jefferson – 9 carries, 39 yards
- UW – Salvon Ahmed – 25 carries, 174 yards, 2 TD

Top receiving

- OSU – Isaiah Hodgins – 4 receptions, 33 yards
- UW – Hunter Bryant – 5 receptions, 90 yards

=== At Colorado ===
Washington at Colorado – Game summary

Quarter	1	2	3	4	Total
Huskies	0	0	7	7	14
Buffaloes	3	10	7	0	20

at Folsom Field • Boulder, CO

- Date: November 23, 2019
- Game time: 7:00 p.m. PST
- Game attendance: 44,618
- TV: FOX

Game information

Top passers

- UW – Jacob Eason: 21/34, 206 yards, 1 touchdown, 1 interception
- CU – Steven Montez: 17/28, 223 yards, 1 touchdown

Top rushers

- UW – Richard Newton: 12 rushes, 32 yards, 1 touchdown
- CU – Alex Fontenot: 24 rushes, 105 yards, 1 touchdown

Top receiving

- UW – Hunter Bryant: 5 receptions, 82 yards
- CU – Laviska Shenault: 7 receptions, 100 yards, 1 touchdown

=== Washington State ===
Washington State at Washington – Game summary

Quarter	1	2	3	4	Total
Cougars	7	3	3	0	13
Huskies	7	14	7	3	31

at Husky Stadium • Seattle, WA

- Date: November 29, 2019
- Game time: 1:00 p.m. PDT
- Game attendance: 70,931
- TV: FOX/FS1

Game information

Top passers

- WSU – Anthony Gordon – 48-62, 308 yards, 2 INT
- UW – Jacob Eason – 15-22, 244 yards, 1 TD

Top rushers

- WSU – Max Borghi – 10 carries, 50 yards, 1 TD
- UW – Salvon Ahmed – 16 carries, 85 yards

Top receiving

- WSU – Renard Bell – 9 receptions, 87 yards
- UW – Hunter Bryant – 6 receptions, 96 yards

=== Vs. Boise State (Las Vegas Bowl) ===
Washington vs No. 19 Boise State (Las Vegas Bowl) – Game summary

Quarter	1	2	3	4	Total
Huskies	7	10	7	14	38
No. 19 Broncos	0	0	7	0	7

at Sam Boyd Stadium • Whitney, NV

- Date: December 21, 2019
- Game time: 4:30 pm PDT
- Game weather: 55 °F (13 °C) • Weather: Mostly Sunny • Wind: 4 MPH NE
- Game attendance: 34,197
- Referee: Rodney Burnette
- TV announcers (ABC): Bob Wischusen (play-by-play), Kirk Herbstreit (color), Molly McGrath (sideline)
- ESPN game summary

Game information

First Quarter

- (5:32) WASH – Jacob Eason 17 yard pass to Andre Baccellia, Peyton Henry kick (Drive: 12 plays, 52 yards, 6:07; Washington 7–0)

Second Quarter

- (6:46) WASH – Salvon Ahmed 8 yard rush, Peyton Henry kick (Drive: 13 plays, 74 yards, 5:53; Washington 14–0)
- (0:00) WASH – Peyton Henry 32 yard field goal (Drive: 4 plays, 41 yards, 0:23; Washington 17–0)

Third Quarter

- (10:22) WASH – Richard Newton 2 yard rush, Peyton Henry kick (Drive: 3 plays, 24 yards, 0:49; Washington 24–0)
- (4:44) BSU – Jaylon Henderson 10 yard pass to George Holani, Eric Sachse kick (Drive: 11 plays, 77 yards, 5:30; Washington 24–7)

Fourth Quarter

- (10:44) WASH – Richard Newton 13 yard pass to Terrell Bynum, Peyton Henry kick (Drive: 6 plays, 60 yards, 3:27; Washington 31–7)
- (2:29) WASH – Salvon Ahmed 12 yard rush, Peyton Henry kick (Drive: 11 plays, 55 yards, 7:39; Washington 38–7)

Top passers

- UW – Jacob Eason – 23-33, 210 yards, 1 TD
- BSU – Hank Bachmeier – 15-26, 119 yards, 2 INT

Top rushers

- UW – Richard Newton – 15 carries, 69 yards, 1 TD
- BSU – George Holani – 11 carries, 35 yards

Top receiving

- UW – Terrell Bynum – 5 receptions, 67 yards, 1 TD
- BSU – Khalil Shakir – 3 receptions, 38 yards

== Players drafted into the NFL ==
Round	Pick	Player	Position	NFL club
4	122	Jacob Eason	QB	Indianapolis Colts
5	160	Nick Harris	C	Cleveland Browns
