= Peter Sirmon =

American football player and coach (born 1977)

New Orleans Saints
- Title: Linebackers coach

Personal information
- Born: February 18, 1977 (age 49); Wenatchee, Washington, U.S.
- Listed height: 6 ft 2 in (1.88 m)
- Listed weight: 237 lb (108 kg)

Career information
- Position: Linebacker (No. 59)
- High school: Walla Walla (Walla Walla, Washington)
- College: Oregon
- NFL draft: 2000: 4th round, 128th overall pick

Career history

Playing
- Tennessee Titans (2000–2006)

Coaching
- Central Washington (2008) Linebackers coach; Oregon (2009) Graduate assistant; Tennessee (2010) Graduate assistant; Tennessee (2011) Linebackers coach; Washington (2012) Linebackers coach; Washington (2013) Linebackers coach & recruiting coordinator; USC (2014–2015) Associate head coach, linebackers coach & recruiting coordinator; Mississippi State (2016) Defensive coordinator & linebackers coach; Louisville (2017) Defensive coordinator & outside linebackers coach; California (2018) Associate head coach & inside linebackers coach; California (2019) Associate head coach, co-defensive coordinator, inside linebackers coach & recruiting coordinator; California (2020–2024) Defensive coordinator, inside linebackers coach & recruiting coordinator; New Orleans Saints (2025–present) Linebackers coach

Awards and highlights
- First-team All-Pac-10 (1999); Second-team All-Pac-10 (1997)

Career NFL statistics
- Total tackles: 349
- Sacks: 5
- Forced fumbles: 1
- Fumble recoveries: 1
- Interceptions: 4
- Defensive touchdowns: 1
- Stats at Pro Football Reference

Peter Anton Sirmon (born February 18, 1977) is an American football coach and former professional linebacker who currently serves as the linebackers coach for the New Orleans Saints of the National Football League (NFL). He was selected in the 2000 NFL draft by the Tennessee Titans and played for them for his entire career from 2000 to 2006. Sirmon played college football for the Oregon Ducks, and high school football at Walla Walla High School, where he played quarterback and safety.

== Professional career ==
Pre-draft measurables
Height	Weight	Arm length	Hand span	40-yard dash	10-yard split	20-yard split	20-yard shuttle	Three-cone drill	Vertical jump	Broad jump	Bench press
6 ft 1 7/8 in (1.88 m)	246 lb (112 kg)	31 1/8 in (0.79 m)	9 5/8 in (0.24 m)	4.79 s	1.60 s	2.72 s	4.27 s	7.21 s	34.5 in (0.88 m)	9 ft 7 in (2.92 m)	20 reps
All values from NFL Combine

Sirmon was selected by the Tennessee Titans in the fourth round (128th overall) of the 2000 NFL draft.

== Coaching career ==
In 2008, Sirmon became the linebackers coach at Central Washington.

He was the linebackers coach at the University of Tennessee under head coach Derek Dooley in 2010 and 2011. Sirmon worked under his Oregon defensive teammate Justin Wilcox, who had become defensive coordinator at Tennessee. He also followed Wilcox in 2012 and was named the linebackers coach at University of Washington. He was brought in by Steve Sarkisian as his linebackers coach when Wilcox was hired by the University of Southern California as defensive coordinator.

On January 12, 2016, Sirmon became the new defensive coordinator at Mississippi State.

In January 2017, Mississippi State replaced Sirmon and hired Todd Grantham as defensive coordinator from Louisville. Sirmon was then named the new defensive coordinator at the University of Louisville resulting in a swap of defensive coordinators.

Sirmon left Louisville and moved to the University of California, Berkeley in 2018, where he is the Bears' inside linebackers coach and defensive coordinator.

Prior to the 2019 season, Sirmon was named co-defensive coordinator at Cal.

Alongside fellow staff member Tim DeRuyter, Sirmon was named FootballScoop's Linebacker Coach of the Year in 2019.

On February 25, 2025, the New Orleans Saints hired Sirmon to serve as their linebackers coach.

== NFL career statistics ==
Legend
**Bold**	Career high

=== Regular season ===
Year	Team	Games		Tackles					Interceptions					Fumbles			
Year	Team	GP	GS	Cmb	Solo	Ast	Sck	TFL	Int	Yds	TD	Lng	PD	FF	FR	Yds	TD
2000	TEN	5	0	3	3	0	0.0	0	0	0	0	0	0	0	0	0	0
2001	TEN	**16**	0	7	6	1	0.0	0	0	0	0	0	0	0	0	0	0
2002	TEN	**16**	12	**95**	**74**	21	2.0	6	**3**	**88**	**1**	**32**	**4**	0	0	0	0
2003	TEN	14	14	87	64	23	0.0	**8**	0	0	0	0	2	**1**	0	0	0
2005	TEN	14	13	69	46	23	**2.5**	5	0	0	0	0	2	0	**1**	**41**	0
2006	TEN	**16**	**15**	88	60	**28**	0.5	5	1	13	0	13	**4**	0	0	0	0
		81	54	349	253	96	5.0	24	4	101	1	32	12	1	1	41	0

=== Playoffs ===
Year	Team	Games		Tackles					Interceptions					Fumbles			
Year	Team	GP	GS	Cmb	Solo	Ast	Sck	TFL	Int	Yds	TD	Lng	PD	FF	FR	Yds	TD
2002	TEN	**2**	1	7	5	2	0.0	0	0	0	0	0	0	0	0	0	0
2003	TEN	**2**	**2**	**15**	**10**	**5**	0.0	0	0	0	0	0	**1**	0	0	0	0
		4	3	22	15	7	0.0	0	0	0	0	0	1	0	0	0	0

== Personal life ==
Sirmon is the father of New Orleans Saints linebacker, Jackson Sirmon and uncle of former Cleveland Browns quarterback, Jacob Sirmon.
