= Jordan Paopao =

American football player and coach (born 1986)

Washington Huskies
- Title: Tight ends coach

Personal information
- Born: June 25, 1986 (age 40); Oceanside, California, U.S.

Career information
- High school: Oceanside (CA) El Camino
- College: San Diego

Career history
- Stanford (2008–2009) Recruiting assistant; Azusa Pacific (2010) Offensive line coach, run game coordinator & recruiting coordinator; Washington (2011–2012) Tight ends coach; Washington (2013–2019) Tight ends coach; UNLV (2020–2021) Tight ends coach; Arizona (2022–2023) Special teams coordinator & tight ends coach; Washington (2024) Special teams coordinator & tight ends coach; Washington (2025–present) Tight ends coach

Jordan Paopao (born June 25, 1986) is an American football coach who is the current tight ends coach for the Washington Huskies. He previously coached at Arizona, UNLV, Azusa. He also was a recruiting assistant for Stanford.

Paopao played college at San Diego Toreros as an offensive lineman.

== Coaching career ==
=== Stanford Cardinals ===
Paopao served as a recruiting assistant under Jim Harbaugh, who coached him during his playing career at his time playing during college at the San Diego Toreros.

=== Azusa Pacific Cougars ===
In 2010, Paopao served as the recruiting coordinator, offensive line coach and run game coordinator for the Azusa Pacific.

=== Washington Huskies ===
In 2011, Paopao was hired as the graduate assistant and tight ends coach for the Washington Huskies.

In January 2013, Paopao took on the role of UW tight ends coach, following two seasons as a graduate assistant at Washington. During his time as a graduate assistant, he also had responsibilities overseeing the tight ends.

Paopao played a key role in coaching the Husky offense during the record-breaking 2016 season. The team achieved a remarkable 12–2 record, secured the Pac-12 Conference title, and earned a spot in the College Football Playoff. Notably, the Huskies set school records for touchdowns (77) and points (585), surpassing previous marks. Their scoring average of 41.8 points per game ranked first in the Pac-12 and eighth nationally, just 0.1 points shy of the 1991 school record. Additionally, two of the team's tight ends, Darrell Daniels and Sample, received honorable mention All-Pac-12 recognition.

During his two years as a graduate assistant, Paopao mentored various players, including tight end Austin Seferian-Jenkins. Seferian-Jenkins made significant contributions, breaking numerous UW single-season and career records for the tight end position. He holds school records for season (69) and career (110) receptions, season (850) and career (1,388) receiving yards, and career touchdowns (13) by a tight end.

In the 2017 season, Paopao guided a talented group of tight ends, featuring Will Dissly, a fourth-round pick in the 2018 NFL draft and a second team All-Pac-12 selection. This marked the second occasion a tight end had been drafted under Paopao's guidance. Notably, Dissly was one of four former UW tight ends coached by Paopao participating in NFL fall camps the previous year. Unfortunately, Dissly's impactful season was cut short by a season-ending injury. Despite this setback, he had swiftly become a crucial element in the Seahawks' offense, scoring touchdowns in each of Seattle's first two games in the 2018 season.

In 2018, Paopao's tight ends group comprised a substantial roster of contributors to Washington's offense. The team often deployed two or three tight ends simultaneously on the field. Senior Drew Sample received honorable mention All-Pac-12 recognition, showcasing his valuable contributions. Additionally, redshirt freshman Cade Otton emerged as a promising talent, while sophomore Hunter Bryant's return from injury later in the season played a pivotal role in the Huskies securing their second Pac-12 Football Championship Game in the last three years.

=== UNLV Rebels ===
Paopao joins UNLV Rebels football following a seven-season tenure as the tight end coach at Washington. His primary responsibility will be addressing the challenges of a special teams unit that ranked 111th nationally in 2019, according to FPI. Throughout his tenure with the Huskies.

=== Arizona Wildcats ===
In 2022, Paopao became part of Jedd Fisch newly forming coaching staff at Arizona. During his short time at Arizona, he helped turn Tanner McLachlan into an all-conference pick.

=== Washington Huskies (second coaching stint) ===
On January 16, 2024, Paopao left Arizona to go follow coach Jedd Fisch after the news that Fisch would be taking the head coaching job.

Paopao was hired as the tight ends coach and the special teams' coordinator.

== Personal life ==
Paopao is the nephew of former BC Lions quarterback, Joe Paopao.
