= Jacob Sirmon =

American football player (born 1999)

No. 15
- Position: Quarterback

Personal information
- Born: May 30, 1999 (age 27)
- Listed height: 6 ft 4 in (1.93 m)
- Listed weight: 235 lb (107 kg)

Career information
- High school: Bothell (Bothell, Washington)
- College: Washington (2018–2020); Central Michigan (2021); Northern Colorado (2022–2023)
- NFL draft: 2024: undrafted

Career history
- Cleveland Browns (2024)*
- * Offseason or practice squad member only

Jacob Sirmon (born May 30, 1999) is an American former professional football quarterback. He played college football for the Washington Huskies, Central Michigan Chippewas and Northern Colorado Bears.

== Early life ==
Sirmon grew up in Bothell, Washington. His father, five uncles and both grandfathers all played college football, including his uncle Peter Sirmon who played in the National Football League.

Sirmon attended Bothell High School and was a top quarterback, throwing for a career 5,786 yards and 47 touchdown passes while being first-team All-KingCo and the 4A KingCo offensive most valuable player as a senior, as well as an invitee to the Under Armour All-America Game. A highly-ranked prospect, he placed first in the state, second for prostyle quarterbacks and 30th nationally in recruiting rankings according to ESPN. He committed to play for the Washington Huskies.

== College career ==
Sirmon redshirted at the University of Washington as a true freshman in 2018. He was backup to Jacob Eason in the 2019 season and played in five games, totaling two completions on three attempts for 19 yards. He entered the NCAA transfer portal prior to the 2020 season, but ultimately stayed with the team. He competed for the starting job in 2020 but lost to Dylan Morris, finishing the season with one game played while completing his only pass for nine yards. He entered the transfer portal for a second time after the season ended.

Sirmon ultimately transferred to the Central Michigan Chippewas. He won the starting nod and started the first four games before being replaced, only appearing once more in the season. He finished having completed 73-of-119 pass attempts for 734 yards and six touchdowns, with four interceptions. He entered the transfer portal again following the 2021 season and ultimately transferred to the Northern Colorado Bears.

In his first season at the University of Northern Colorado, Sirmon appeared in seven games and completed 52-of-93 passes for 595 yards and four touchdowns, with two interceptions. He returned for a final season in 2023 and was named starter. He threw for 1,255 yards and eight touchdown while completing 133-of-236 pass attempts.

=== Statistics ===
Year	Team	Games			Passing								Rushing			
Year	Team	GP	GS	Record	Cmp	Att	Pct	Yds	Avg	TD	INT	Rtg	Att	Yds	Avg	TD
2018	Washington	Redshirt (redshirt)														
2019	Washington	5	0	0–0	2	3	66.7	19	6.3	0	0	119.9	2	-5	-2.5	0
2020	Washington	1	0	0–0	1	1	100.0	9	9.0	0	0	175.6	2	5	2.5	0
2021	Central Michigan	5	4	2–2	73	119	61.3	734	6.2	6	4	123.1	27	−53	−2.0	0
2022	Northern Colorado	7	1	1–0	52	93	55.9	595	6.4	4	2	119.5	20	-60	-3.0	0
2023	Northern Colorado	9	8	0–8	133	236	56.4	1,255	5.3	8	9	104.6	44	-31	-0.7	1
Career		27	13	3–10	261	452	57.7	2,612	5.7	18	15	115.8	95	-144	-1.5	1

== Professional career ==
Pre-draft measurables
Height	Weight
6 ft 4 1/8 in (1.93 m)	235 lb (107 kg)
Values from Pro Day

After going unselected in the 2024 NFL draft, Sirmon was signed by the Cleveland Browns as an undrafted free agent following his performance at the team's rookie minicamp. He was waived by the Browns on May 20, 2024.

On March 17, 2025, Sirmon announced his retirement from professional football.

== Personal life ==
Sirmon is the nephew of former NFL linebacker and current California defensive coordinator and linebackers coach, Peter Sirmon and the cousin of New Orleans Saints linebacker, Jackson Sirmon.
