= Centennial High School (Arizona) =

Public high school in Peoria, Arizona, United States

Location
- 14388 North 79th Avenue; Peoria, Arizona 85381; United States of America; 33°37′00″N 112°13′49″W

Information
- Type: Public Secondary
- Established: 1990; 36 years ago
- School district: Peoria Unified School District
- Principal: Scott Hollabaugh
- Teaching staff: 85.76 (FTE)
- Grades: 9 to 12
- Enrollment: 2,002 (2023-2024)
- Student to teacher ratio: 23.34
- Colors: Red, White, and Navy Blue
- Mascot: Coyote
- Feeder schools: Desert Harbor Elementary; Ira A Murphy Elementary; Oasis Elementary; Paseo Verde Elementary; Sundance Elementary
- Website: www.peoriaunified.org/o/centennial

Centennial High School (CeHS) is a public secondary school in Peoria, Arizona, United States, part of the Peoria Unified School District. The school opened its doors in August 1990.

== State titles ==
- Football: The Centennial football team has won the state title in: 2018, 2017 (5A), 2015 (Div I), 2014 (Div II), 2008, 2007, and 2006 (5A Div II).
- Softball: The Centennial girls' softball team won the state title in 2010 (5A Div II).
- The Centennial boys' track and field team won state titles in 2004 and 2005 (4A).
- Volleyball: The Centennial girls' volleyball team won state titles in: 2016 (5A), 2008 (5A Div II), and 1998 (4A Div II).

== Visual and performing arts ==
The Performing Arts division at CeHS is designed to allow students to explore a variety of visual performing arts. Visual art classes include art, ceramics, media, and photo. Centennial also offers classes in dance, chorus, and band.

== Sexual abuse allegations ==
In August 2025, two teachers at the school were placed on leave following allegations of sexual misconduct with a student at the school. Haley Beck, 27, the sister of Noah Beck, and Angela Burlaka, 47, were accused of being in sexual relationships with the same student while being teachers.

The school said in a statement to People that Beck groomed the student, and then engaged in a sexual relationship with him.

== Notable alumni ==
- Dominique Hampton, college football player for the Washington Huskies
- Tawee Walker, college football running back for the Wisconsin Badgers
