= Drew Sample =

American football player (born 1996)

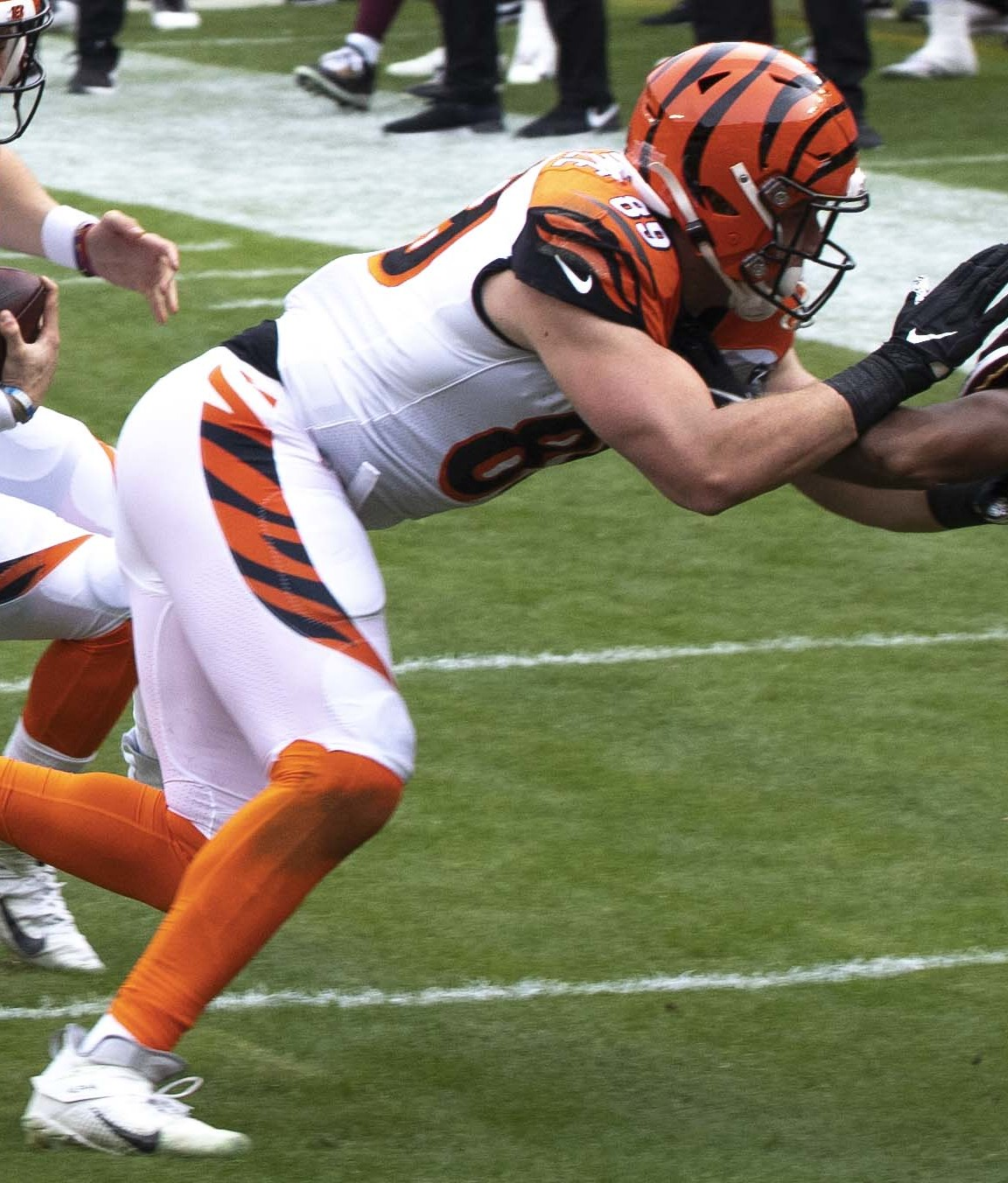
- Sample with the Cincinnati Bengals in 2020

No. 89 – Cincinnati Bengals
- Positions: Tight end, fullback
- Roster status: Active

Personal information
- Born: April 16, 1996 (age 30); Bellevue, Washington, U.S.
- Listed height: 6 ft 5 in (1.96 m)
- Listed weight: 260 lb (118 kg)

Career information
- High school: Newport (Bellevue)
- College: Washington (2014–2018)
- NFL draft: 2019: 2nd round, 52nd overall pick

Career history
- Cincinnati Bengals (2019–present)

Career NFL statistics as of Week 10, 2026
- Receptions: 125
- Receiving yards: 899
- Receiving touchdowns: 7
- Stats at Pro Football Reference

Drew Sample (born April 16, 1996) is an American professional football tight end and fullback for the Cincinnati Bengals of the National Football League (NFL). He played college football for the Washington Huskies and was selected by the Cincinnati Bengals in the second round of the 2019 NFL draft.

== Early life ==
Drew Sample was born on April 16, 1996, in Bellevue, Washington. He attended Newport High School in Bellevue.

== College career ==
Sample caught 46 passes for 487 yards and five touchdowns in his four seasons at the University of Washington. As a senior, he caught 25 passes for 252 yards and three touchdowns, earning him an honorable mention on the All-Pac-12 Conference team.

== Professional career ==
Pre-draft measurables
Height	Weight	Arm length	Hand span	Wingspan	40-yard dash	10-yard split	20-yard split	20-yard shuttle	Three-cone drill	Vertical jump	Broad jump
6 ft 4 3/4 in (1.95 m)	255 lb (116 kg)	33 3/8 in (0.85 m)	9 5/8 in (0.24 m)	6 ft 7 1/4 in (2.01 m)	4.71 s	1.58 s	2.73 s	4.31 s	7.15 s	33.5 in (0.85 m)	9 ft 7 in (2.92 m)
All values from NFL Combine

Sample was selected by the Cincinnati Bengals in the second round with the 52nd overall pick in the 2019 NFL draft. He started the season as the third tight end on the depth chart, behind C. J. Uzomah and Tyler Eifert. He made his first career catch in Week 2 against the San Francisco 49ers. He was placed on injured reserve on December 7, 2019, with an ankle injury. He finished the season with five catches for 30 yards through nine games and two starts.

Sample received significantly more playing time in 2020 due to Uzomah suffering a season-ending injury. Sample played in all 16 games and started in 13. He caught 40 passes for 349 yards and a touchdown, in Week 17 against the Houston Texans.

In the 2021 season, Sample appeared in all 17 games, starting in 8 of them. He finished the regular season with 11 receptions for 81 yards. In the Bengals' playoff run en route to Super Bowl LVI, he recorded 1 catch for 4 yards in the AFC Championship Game against the Kansas City Chiefs. Sample primarily contributed to the Bengals as a blocking specialist.

Sample started the first two games of the 2022 season, where he was once again heavily used as a blocker. In Week 2 against the Dallas Cowboys, Sample suffered a season-ending knee injury and was placed on injured reserve on October 3, 2022.

On April 14, 2023, Sample re-signed with the Bengals on a one-year contract. He was named the second tight end on the depth chart behind Irv Smith Jr., but saw starting time due to Smith injuring his hamstring in Week 2 against the Baltimore Ravens. Sample caught two touchdown passes in 2023, one in Week 9 against the Buffalo Bills, and the other in Week 12 against the Pittsburgh Steelers, being his first touchdowns in three years. Sample finished the season with 163 yards, 22 receptions, and a touchdown. Sample was graded by the analytics website Pro Football Focus as the eighth best blocking tight end in the league during the 2023 NFL season.

On March 11, 2024, Sample signed a three-year, $10.5 million contract extension with the Bengals through the 2026 season.

During the 2024 season, Sample recorded 20 receptions on 22 targets for 109 yards and 1 touchdown and recorded one rushing attempt for a loss of 4 yards.

When defensive end Sam Hubbard, who was drafted by the Cincinnati Bengals in the third round of the 2018 NFL draft, announced his retirement on March 5, 2025, Sample became the longest-tenured active member of the Bengals. During the 2025 season, Sample recorded 15 receptions on 20 targets for 106 yards and 1 touchdown and recorded one rushing attempt for a gain of 3 yards.

== Career statistics ==
=== NFL ===
Legend
**Bold**	Career best

==== Regular season ====
Year	Team	Games		Receiving						Fumbles	
Year	Team	GP	GS	Tgt	Rec	Yds	Avg	Lng	TD	Fum	Lost
2019	CIN	9	2	6	5	30	6.0	21	0	0	0
2020	CIN	16	13	**53**	**40**	**349**	**8.7**	23	1	1	1
2021	CIN	**17**	8	15	11	81	7.4	19	0	0	0
2022	CIN	2	2	2	2	-2	-1.0	2	0	0	0
2023	CIN	**17**	10	27	22	163	7.4	22	**2**	0	0
2024	CIN	**17**	**15**	22	20	109	5.5	12	1	1	0
2025	CIN	**17**	12	20	15	106	7.1	**27**	1	0	0
Career		95	62	145	115	836	7.3	27	5	2	1

==== Playoffs ====
Year	Team	Games		Receiving						Fumbles	
Year	Team	GP	GS	Tgt	Rec	Yds	Avg	Lng	TD	Fum	Lost
2021	CIN	4	2	2	1	4	4.0	4	0	0	0
Career		4	2	2	1	4	4.0	4	0	0	0

=== College ===
Year	Team	Games		Receiving			
Year	Team	GP	GS	Rec	Yards	Avg	TD
2014	Washington	Redshirt (redshirt)					
2015	Washington	13	7	5	45	9.0	2
2016	Washington	**14**	12	9	106	11.8	0
2017	Washington	10	7	7	84	**12.0**	0
2018	Washington	**14**	**14**	**25**	**252**	10.1	**3**
Career		52	40	46	487	10.6	5
