= Trey Adams =

American football player (born 1997)

No. 72
- Position: Offensive tackle

Personal information
- Born: March 4, 1997 (age 29); Wenatchee, Washington, U.S.
- Listed height: 6 ft 8 in (2.03 m)
- Listed weight: 327 lb (148 kg)

Career information
- High school: Wenatchee
- College: Washington (2015–2019)
- NFL draft: 2020: undrafted

Career history
- Buffalo Bills (2020)*
- * Offseason or practice squad member only

Awards and highlights
- Second-team All-American (2016); 2× First-team All-Pac-12 (2016, 2019)
- Stats at Pro Football Reference

Trey Adams (born March 4, 1997) is an American former professional football player who was an offensive tackle in the National Football League (NFL). He played college football for Washington Huskies.

== Early life ==
Adams attended Wenatchee High School in Wenatchee, Washington. While there he played tackle on the school's football team.

== College career ==
=== Washington ===
==== 2015–2016 ====
At the University of Washington, Adams played 10 games for the Huskies as a true freshman, and became the first true freshman to start on the offensive line for the Huskies since 2012.

==== 2017 ====
During the 2017 season, Adams started the first 7 games, but after tearing his ACL in a game against Arizona State, he would remain benched for the rest of the season. Prior to the injury, Adams was speculated as a first-round draft pick for the 2018 NFL draft. Adams later announced that he would return to school for his senior year.

==== 2018 ====
In September 2018, a back injury prior to the start of the 2018 season caused him to miss the 2018 Chick-fil-A Kickoff Game between Auburn and Washington. He would remain benched for the first 10 games of the season. Adams would return to play in a November game against Oregon State, and he returned to the starting lineup for the 2018 Pac-12 Championship Game. He has stated his intent to return to Washington for the 2019 season, his final year of eligibility.

==== 2019 ====
Adams returned to play in his fifth and final year of eligibility in 2019, starting as left tackle in the Huskies' opening game against Eastern Washington on August 31.

== Professional career ==
After not being selected in the 2020 NFL draft, Adams signed with the Buffalo Bills on May 7, 2020. He was waived by Buffalo on September 5, and was re-signed to the team's practice squad the following day.

On January 26, 2021, Adams signed a reserves/futures contract with the Bills. He announced his retirement from the NFL on April 15, and the Bills waived him on May 4.
