= Taki Taimani =

American football player (born 1999)

No. 74 – Detroit Lions
- Position: Nose tackle
- Roster status: Practice squad

Personal information
- Born: October 6, 1999 (age 27); Salt Lake City, Utah, U.S.
- Listed height: 6 ft 1 in (1.85 m)
- Listed weight: 324 lb (147 kg)

Career information
- High school: East (Salt Lake City, Utah)
- College: Washington (2018–2021); Oregon (2022–2023)
- NFL draft: 2024: undrafted

Career history
- Minnesota Vikings (2024–2026); Detroit Lions (2026–present)*
- * Offseason or practice squad member only

Career NFL statistics as of Week 2, 2026
- Total tackles: 4
- Stats at Pro Football Reference

Sam "Taki" Taimani (born October 6, 1999) is an American professional football nose tackle for the Detroit Lions of the National Football League (NFL). He played college football for the Oregon Ducks and Washington Huskies.

== Early life ==
Taimani attended East High School in Salt Lake City, Utah. He was rated as a four-star recruit and committed to play college football for the Washington Huskies.

== College career ==
=== Washington ===
In week 3 of the 2020 season, Taimani notched five tackles in a win over Utah. In week 5 of the 2021 season, in a loss to Oregon State, he recovered a fumble which he returned 13 yards inside the Beavers 10-yard line. In week 10 of the 2021 season, Taimani made the start where he tallied four tackles in a loss against Oregon.

In his first four seasons at Washington from 2018 to 2021 Taimani totaled 71 tackles with three and a half being for a loss, two pass deflections, and a fumble recovery. After the 2021 season, he entered his name into the NCAA transfer portal.

=== Oregon ===
Taimani transferred to play for the Oregon Ducks. In his final two seasons with Oregon in 2022 and 2023, he recorded 36 tackles with two and a half being for a loss, a pass deflection, and a fumble recovery.

== Professional career ==
Pre-draft measurables
Height	Weight	Arm length	Hand span	Wingspan	40-yard dash	10-yard split	20-yard split	20-yard shuttle	Three-cone drill	Vertical jump	Broad jump	Bench press
6 ft 1 1/2 in (1.87 m)	309 lb (140 kg)	31 7/8 in (0.81 m)	10 3/4 in (0.27 m)	6 ft 5 1/2 in (1.97 m)	5.33 s	1.84 s	3.04 s	5.03 s	7.95 s	25 in (0.64 m)	8 ft 6 in (2.59 m)	19 reps
All values from Pro Day

=== Minnesota Vikings ===
After not being selected in the 2024 NFL draft, Taimani signed with the Minnesota Vikings as an undrafted free agent. He was also selected by the Arlington Renegades in the 7th round of the 2024 UFL draft on July 17, 2024. Taimani made the Vikings' initial 53-man roster.

On August 26, 2025, Taimani was waived by the Vikings as part of final roster cuts; he was re–signed to the team's practice squad the following day. On January 2, 2026, Taimani was signed to Minnesota's active roster.

On August 24, 2026, Taimani was waived with an injury designation and reverted to injured reserve the next day. On September 22, he was waived by the Vikings.

=== Detroit Lions ===
On October 27, 2026, Taimani signed with the Detroit Lions practice squad.
