= Dominique Hampton =

American football player (born 2000)

No. 40 – Tennessee Titans
- Position: Linebacker
- Roster status: Practice squad

Personal information
- Born: July 25, 2000 (age 26); Atlanta, Georgia, U.S.
- Listed height: 6 ft 3 in (1.91 m)
- Listed weight: 220 lb (100 kg)

Career information
- High school: Centennial (Peoria, Arizona)
- College: Washington (2018–2023)
- NFL draft: 2024: 5th round, 161st overall pick

Career history
- Washington Commanders (2024–2025); Chicago Bears (2025)*; Tennessee Titans (2026–present)
- * Offseason or practice squad member only

Career NFL statistics as of Week 10, 2026
- Tackles: 1
- Stats at Pro Football Reference

Dominique Hampton (born July 25, 2000) is an American professional football linebacker for the Tennessee Titans of the National Football League (NFL). He played college football as a safety for the Washington Huskies and was selected by the Washington Commanders in the fifth round of the 2024 NFL draft. He has also been a member of the Chicago Bears.

== Early life ==
Hampton was born on July 25, 2000, in Atlanta, Georgia, later moving as an young child to Glendale, Arizona. He attended Centennial High School in Peoria, Arizona. In week one of Hampton's senior season, he intercepted two passes, both which he returned for touchdowns as he helped his school win 49–0. Coming out of high school, Hampton was rated as a three-star recruit where he decided to commit to play college football for the Washington Huskies.

== College career ==
In Hampton's first three seasons in 2018, 2019, and 2020 he played in 19 games where he made nine tackles and had a pass deflection. In week ten of the 2021 season, Hampton made his first career start versus Stanford. In the 2021 season, Hampton played in eleven games with starts as he notched 30 tackles, two pass deflections, and a forced fumble. During the 2022 season, Hampton played in 12 games with 11 starts, where he notched 42 tackles with four pass deflections. In week four of the 2023 season, Hampton recorded his first career interception in a win over California. During the 2023 season, Hampton totaled 109 tackles, seven pass deflections, and two interceptions. He appeared in 57 games with the Huskies, a school record.

== Professional career ==
Pre-draft measurables
Height	Weight	Arm length	Hand span	Wingspan	40-yard dash	10-yard split	20-yard split	20-yard shuttle	Three-cone drill	Vertical jump	Broad jump	Bench press
6 ft 2 3/8 in (1.89 m)	215 lb (98 kg)	33 1/4 in (0.84 m)	10 in (0.25 m)	6 ft 7 7/8 in (2.03 m)	4.45 s	1.57 s	2.55 s	4.14 s	6.83 s	39.0 in (0.99 m)	10 ft 2 in (3.10 m)	20 reps
All values from NFL Combine/Pro Day

=== Washington Commanders ===
Hampton was selected by the Washington Commanders in the fifth round (161st overall) of the 2024 NFL draft. He signed his four-year rookie contract on May 10, 2024. He moved from safety to linebacker prior to the start of the season. Hampton was released on August 11, 2025.

=== Chicago Bears ===
On November 24, 2025, Hampton was signed to the Chicago Bears' practice squad due to several Bears linebackers suffering injuries. He was released by the Bears on December 1, but was re-signed to the team's practice squad on December 16.

Hampton signed a reserve/futures contract with Chicago on January 20, 2026, but was waived by the team on June 16.

=== Tennessee Titans ===
On August 6, 2026, Hampton signed with the Tennessee Titans. He was waived/injured by the team on August 25. On September 3, Hampton was waived by Tennessee with an injury settlement. On October 30, he was re-signed to the practice squad.
