= Andre Baccellia =

American football player (born 1997)

Profile
- Position: Wide receiver

Personal information
- Born: January 7, 1997 (age 29); Thousand Oaks, California, U.S.
- Listed height: 5 ft 10 in (1.78 m)
- Listed weight: 180 lb (82 kg)

Career information
- High school: Westlake (Thousand Oaks)
- College: Washington (2015–2019)
- NFL draft: 2020: undrafted

Career history
- Kansas City Chiefs (2020)*; New England Patriots (2020)*; Arizona Cardinals (2021–2026)
- * Offseason or practice squad member only

Career NFL statistics as of 2026
- Receptions: 9
- Receiving yards: 53
- Stats at Pro Football Reference

Andre Baccellia (born January 7, 1997) is an American professional football wide receiver. He played college football for the Washington Huskies and was originally signed as an undrafted free agent by the Kansas City Chiefs in 2020. He later played for the New England Patriots and Arizona Cardinals.

== Early life ==
Baccellia was born on January 7, 1997, in Thousand Oaks, California. He attended high school there for Westlake, playing football and track. As a junior in high school, Baccellia caught 46 passes for 954 yards and 11 touchdowns, helping his team achieve an 8–3 record. As a senior, he missed time due to injury but still managed to gain 392 yards on 18 catches, scoring 5 touchdowns. In track, he finished third place in the 100 meter race at the Ventura County Championships. He was ranked the 78th best recruit in California and the 104th receiver overall.

== College career ==
He was given a scholarship to play for University of Washington. He spent his true freshman year as a redshirt, and did not play for their Huskies football team. In his first game the following year, Baccellia recorded two catches for 40 yards and one touchdown in the season opener against Rutgers. He made his first career start later that year, versus Portland State. He finished the season with 7 catches for 98 yards and one touchdown.

He played in just seven games as a sophomore, starting four. Baccellia finished the year with 16 catches for 187 yards. He also threw a 52-yard pass against Penn State in the Fiesta Bowl. He played in all 14 games the following year, starting five. He became more involved on offense as a junior in 2018, making 55 catches for 584 yards. As a senior, Baccellia played in all but one game, and recorded 29 receptions for 314 yards and four touchdowns.

== Professional career ==
Pre-draft measurables
| Height | Weight |
|---|---|
| 5 ft 8 5/8 in (1.74 m) | 175 lb (79 kg) |
Values from Pro Day

=== Kansas City Chiefs ===
After running a 4.28 second 40-yard dash at his college Pro Day, Baccellia was signed by the Kansas City Chiefs as an undrafted free agent following the 2020 NFL draft. He was released near the end of preseason, as the Chiefs already had extensive depth at the wide receiver position.

=== New England Patriots ===
After being waived by the Chiefs, Baccellia was signed by the New England Patriots on August 29, 2020. On September 5, Baccellia was waived by the Patriots.

=== Arizona Cardinals ===
Baccellia was signed by the Arizona Cardinals on April 15, 2021. He was waived at roster cuts and signed to the practice squad the next day. He signed a reserve/future contract with the Cardinals on January 19, 2022.

On August 30, 2022, Baccellia was waived by the Cardinals and signed to the practice squad the next day. He was promoted to the active roster on September 10. He was released ten days later and re-signed to the practice squad. In his first two games played, Baccellia recorded two receptions for 12 yards. He was signed to the active roster on October 8. He was waived on October 11 and re-signed to the practice squad. He was promoted back to the active roster on November 26, then waived and re-signed to the practice squad. He was again promoted to the active roster on December 31. He finished the season with seven receptions for 45 yards in eight games played.

On August 29, 2023, Baccellia was released by the Cardinals and re-signed to the practice squad. He was promoted to the active roster on November 4 and released two days later. He was re-signed to the practice squad on November 8. Baccellia was signed to the active roster on November 18. He was released on December 11 and re-signed to the practice squad the following day. He signed a reserve/future contract on January 8, 2024.

Baccellia was waived by the Cardinals on August 27, 2024, and re-signed to the practice squad.

Baccellia signed a reserve/future contract on January 6, 2025. Baccellia was waived by the Cardinals on August 25 and re-signed to the practice squad two days later. On November 12, he was signed to the active roster. In Week 15 against the Houston Texans, Baccellia suffered a gruesome neck injury and had to be stretchered off the field; however, he had full movement in his extremities and was expected to fly back with the team. On December 16, Baccellia was placed on season-ending injured reserve; he finished the year with two receptions for eight yards across five games.

Baccellia was released by the Cardinals on May 7, 2026, following a failed physical.
