= Matt Lubick =

American football player and coach (born 1972)

Current position
- Title: Co-offensive coordinator and tight ends coach
- Team: Kansas
- Conference: Big 12

Biographical details
- Born: January 26, 1972 (age 54); Bozeman, Montana

Playing career
- 1991–1994: Western Montana
- Position: Defensive back

Coaching career (HC unless noted)
- 1995: Colorado State (GA)
- 1996: Cal State Northridge (DB)
- 1997–1998: San Jose State (WR)
- 1999–2000: Oregon State (DB)
- 2001–2004: Colorado State (WR)
- 2005–2006: Ole Miss (WR)
- 2007–2009: Arizona State (DB)
- 2010–2012: Duke (WR)
- 2013–2015: Oregon (PGC/WR)
- 2016: Oregon (OC/WR)
- 2017–2018: Washington (co-OC/WR)
- 2020–2021: Nebraska (OC/WR)
- 2022–2023: Kansas (senior analyst)
- 2024: Nevada (OC)
- 2025–present: Kansas (Co-OC/TE)

Accomplishments and honors

Awards
- Wide Receivers Coach of the Year (2012)

Matt Lubick (born January 26, 1972) is an American football coach and former player. He is currently the co-offensive coordinator and tight ends coach for the University of Kansas. He was previously the offensive coordinator at the University of Nevada Reno. He was named the 2012 Football Scoop Wide Receivers Coach of the Year while coaching at Duke University. He was also an Orange Bowl Courage Award Finalist in 2024. Matt Lubick has been named an Broyles Award nominee for assistant coach of the year three times in 2012, 2024, and 2025.

== Playing career ==
Lubick was a four-year starter at defensive back for Western Montana College—now known as University of Montana Western—and earned all-conference and NAIA All-America honors as a senior. He earned a bachelor's degree in exercise and sport science from Colorado State in 1995.

== Coaching career ==
Lubick began his coaching career in 1995 as a student assistant coach and academic supervisor under his father, Sonny Lubick at Colorado State University. He then coached one season at Cal State-Northridge in 1996 and two seasons at San Jose State as wide receivers coach (1997–1998). Lubick coached the defensive backs while helping coordinate Oregon State's recruiting efforts for two seasons (1999–2000).

In 2001 Lubick returned to Colorado State as wide receivers coach from 2001 to 2004. Lubick spent two seasons at Ole Miss, where he helped recruit star all-purpose back Dexter McCluster. Former Oregon State head coach Dennis Erickson hired Lubick again in 2007 at Arizona State, where Lubick spent three seasons.

=== Duke ===
In 2010 Lubick moved to Duke as passing game coordinator, receivers coach and recruiting coordinator.

Lubick was one of three finalists for the American Football Coaches Association's Assistant Coach of the Year award for 2012. A big reason is the production his receivers turned in for Duke, which reached a bowl game for the first time since 1994. He was also named the wide receivers coach of the year in 2012 by footballscoop.com.

Duke was the only FBS team in the country in 2012 with three receivers to catch at least 60 passes, led by Conner Vernon's program-record 85 receptions. Vernon and Jamison Crowder also set an ACC record for most catches by a receiving tandem, combining for 157 receptions on the year. The Blue Devils were the 31st-ranked passing team in the FBS in 2012.

=== Oregon ===
On January 28, 2013, University of Oregon football coach Mark Helfrich hired Lubick as the Ducks' passing game coordinator and wide receivers coach. He replaced Scott Frost, who was promoted to offensive coordinator. Lubick's teaching's took Oregon's receivers to much improved level in his first season with the Ducks. Josh Huff set the single-season mark for receiving yards in a season with 1,140, breaking a school record that stood for 43 years. Oregon set a school record for total offense in a season at 7,345, besting the old mark of 7,319 in 2011, which happened during a 14-game season.

On January 1, 2016, Ducks head coach Mark Helfrich announced that Lubick would be promoted to offensive coordinator to replace the outgoing Scott Frost, who was hired as head coach at the University of Central Florida. Coach Frost took a similar path through the Oregon staff, being hired on as the wide receivers coach when Chip Kelly was promoted to head coach in 2009. Frost was subsequently promoted to OC/QB coach. It was announced on January 20, 2016, that Coach Lubick would continue coaching the wide receivers as offensive coordinator. Following Mark Helfrich's dismissal in December 2016 Lubick was not retained by new head coach Willie Taggart.

=== Washington ===
Lubick promptly accepted the position of wide receivers coach at Ole Miss that same December. Less than a month later, he resigned to take the same position at Baylor. Two months later, he finally made up his mind and accepted a position back in the Pac-12, without ever coaching a game for the Rebels or Bears.

On February 22, 2017, it was announced that Lubick would be joining Chris Petersen's staff at Washington as co-offensive coordinator and wide receivers coach.

=== Nebraska ===
On January 17, 2020, it was announced Matt Lubick would be joining Scott Frost's staff at the University of Nebraska. Lubick was one of four offensive assistants dismissed on November 8, 2021, in a major reshuffle of the offensive staff.

=== Kansas ===
In 2022, Lubick joined the University of Kansas as a senior analyst.
