= Jackson Sirmon =

American football player (born 2000)

No. 47 – New Orleans Saints
- Position: Linebacker
- Roster status: Practice squad

Personal information
- Born: April 15, 2000 (age 26); Brentwood, Tennessee, U.S.
- Listed height: 6 ft 2 in (1.88 m)
- Listed weight: 240 lb (109 kg)

Career information
- High school: Loyola (Los Angeles); Brentwood Academy (Brentwood, Tennessee)
- College: Washington (2018–2021); California (2022–2023)
- NFL draft: 2024: undrafted

Career history
- New York Jets (2024–2025); New Orleans Saints (2026–present)*
- * Offseason or practice squad member only

Awards and highlights
- First-team All-Pac-12 (2022)
- Stats at Pro Football Reference

Jackson Sirmon (born April 15, 2000) is an American professional football linebacker for the New Orleans Saints of the National Football League (NFL). He played college football for the Washington Huskies and California Golden Bears.

== Early life ==
Sirmon grew up in Brentwood, Tennessee, and attended Loyola High School and later transferred to Brentwood Academy. In his high school career he tallied 59 tackles with 13 being for a loss, and ten sacks. Sirmon committed to play college football at the University of Washington.

== College career ==
=== Washington ===
As a freshman in 2018, Sirmon totaled one tackle and a forced fumble. In the 2019 Las Vegas Bowl, Sirmon recovered a fumble as the Huskies beat Boise State. Sirmon finished the 2019 season with 28 tackles and two going for a loss, and a fumble recovery. Sirmon had a career day in a win over Utah in 2020, where he racked up nine tackles and a fumble recovery. Sirmon finished the shortened 2020 season with 27 tackles, 1.5 tackles for loss, and a fumble recovery. In week nine of the 2021 season, Sirmon recorded his first career interception, picking a pass in the redzone by quarterback Tanner McKee, helping Washington beat Stanford 20–13. Sirmon finished his breakout 2021 season with 91 tackles with four being for a loss, a pass deflection, an interception, a forced fumble, and a fumble recovery. Sirmon entered the transfer portal following the season.

=== California ===
Sirmon decided to transfer to the University of California, Berkeley, to continue his college career with the California Golden Bears. Sirmon started the 2022 season strong, as in week three he totaled 15 tackles with two going for a loss, and 1.5 sacks, but the Golden Bears fell to Notre Dame 24–17. In week seven, Sirmon picked off a pass by Owen McCown, but California lost 20–13 against Colorado. In week twelve, Sirmon recovered a fumble that he returned for a touchdown that would win the Golden Bears the game, as they would beat Stanford 27–20. Sirmon finished the 2022 season as his best, tallying 104 tackles with six going for a loss, 3.5 sacks, four pass deflections, an interception, a fumble recovery, a forced fumble, and a touchdown. For his performance, Sirmon was named a first-team all Pac-12 selection. After the conclusion of the 2022 season, Sirmon announced that he would return to California for his final season. Sirmon was named preseason first team all Pac-12, for the upcoming 2023 season. Sirmon was also named as a preseason All-American by Athlon Sports. Sirmon would also be named to multiple award watch lists, such as the Bronko Nagurski Trophy watch list, and the Butkus Award watch list.

== Professional career ==
Pre-draft measurables
| Height | Weight | Arm length | Hand span | Wingspan | 20-yard shuttle | Three-cone drill | Vertical jump | Broad jump |
|---|---|---|---|---|---|---|---|---|
| 6 ft 2 1/4 in (1.89 m) | 235 lb (107 kg) | 30 3/8 in (0.77 m) | 9 1/4 in (0.23 m) | 6 ft 2 1/4 in (1.89 m) | 4.26 s | 7.24 s | 34.0 in (0.86 m) | 9 ft 11 in (3.02 m) |
All values from Pro Day

=== New York Jets ===
Sirmon signed with the New York Jets as an undrafted free agent on May 3, 2024. He was waived on August 27, and later re-signed to the practice squad. He signed a reserve/future contract on January 6, 2025.

On August 26, 2025, Sirmon was waived by the Jets as part of final roster cuts and re-signed to the practice squad the next day. He was elevated to the active roster for the Week 7 game against the Carolina Panthers. He played 18 snaps on special teams and posted one solo tackle. Sirmon reverted back to the practice squad after the game.

=== New Orleans Saints ===
On May 27, 2026, Sirmon signed with the New Orleans Saints. On August 30, Sirmon was waived by the Saints as a part of final roster cuts; he was re–signed to the team's practice squad the following day.

== Personal life ==
Sirmon is the son of former NFL linebacker, current New Orleans Saints linebackers coach, and former California defensive coordinator and linebackers coach, Peter Sirmon and the cousin of former Cleveland Browns quarterback, Jacob Sirmon.
