= Benning Potoa'e =

American football player (born 1996)

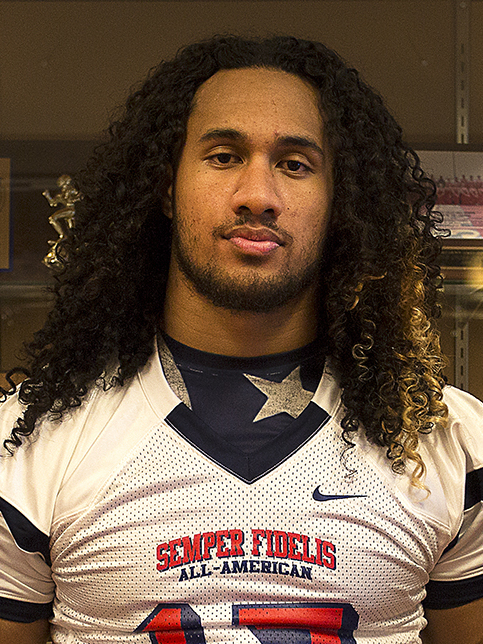
- Potoa'e in 2015

Profile
- Position: Defensive tackle

Personal information
- Born: September 17, 1996 (age 30); DuPont, Washington, U.S.
- Listed height: 6 ft 3 in (1.91 m)
- Listed weight: 290 lb (132 kg)

Career information
- High school: Lakes (Lakewood, Washington)
- College: Washington
- NFL draft: 2020: undrafted

Career history
- Tampa Bay Buccaneers (2020–2021); Washington Commanders (2022–2023); Michigan Panthers (2025)

Awards and highlights
- Super Bowl champion (LV)

Career NFL statistics as of 2023
- Total tackles: 6
- Stats at Pro Football Reference

Benning Potoa'e (born September 17, 1996) is an American professional football defensive tackle. He played college football for the Washington Huskies and signed with the Tampa Bay Buccaneers as an undrafted free agent in 2020. Potoa'e has also played for the Washington Commanders.

== Professional career ==
Pre-draft measurables
Height	Weight	Arm length	Hand span
6 ft 2 7/8 in (1.90 m)	293 lb (133 kg)	31 1/2 in (0.80 m)	10 5/8 in (0.27 m)
All values from Pro Day

=== Tampa Bay Buccaneers ===
Potoa'e signed with the Tampa Bay Buccaneers as an undrafted free agent following the 2020 NFL draft on May 4, 2020. He was waived during final roster cuts on September 5, 2020, and signed to the team's practice squad the next day. He was placed on the practice squad/COVID-19 list by the team on November 30, 2020, and restored to the practice squad on December 5. He was elevated to the active roster on January 2 and 8, 2021, for the team's week 17 and wild card round games against the Atlanta Falcons and Washington Football Team, and reverted to the practice squad after each game. On February 9, 2021, Potoa'e re-signed with the Buccaneers.

On August 31, 2021, Potoa'e was waived by the Buccaneers and re-signed to the practice squad the next day. After the Buccaneers were eliminated in the Divisional Round of the 2021 playoffs, he signed a reserve/future contract on January 24, 2022.

Potoa'e was waived by the Buccaneers on August 30, 2022.

=== Washington Commanders ===
Potoa'e signed with the Washington Commanders' practice squad on September 13, 2022. He was promoted to the active roster on January 6, 2023. On August 29, 2023, Potoa'e was waived by the Commanders and re-signed to the practice squad. He was signed to the active roster on January 5, 2024, and was released on August 27, 2024.

=== Michigan Panthers ===
On May 13, 2025, Potoa'e signed with the Michigan Panthers of the United Football League (UFL).

On July 5, 2025, Potoe'e re-signed with the Panthers.

=== Louisville Kings ===
On January 13, 2026, Potoa'e was selected by the Louisville Kings in the 2026 UFL Draft. He was released on February 9.
