= Salvon Ahmed =

American football player (born 1998)

No. 36 – Chicago Bears
- Position: Running back
- Roster status: Practice squad

Personal information
- Born: December 30, 1998 (age 27); Kirkland, Washington, U.S.
- Listed height: 5 ft 11 in (1.80 m)
- Listed weight: 197 lb (89 kg)

Career information
- High school: Juanita (Kirkland, Washington)
- College: Washington (2017–2019)
- NFL draft: 2020: undrafted

Career history
- San Francisco 49ers (2020)*; Miami Dolphins (2020–2023); Denver Broncos (2024)*; Indianapolis Colts (2024–2025); Chicago Bears (2026–present)
- * Offseason or practice squad member only

Career NFL statistics as of Week 9, 2026
- Rushing yards: 618
- Rushing average: 3.7
- Rushing touchdowns: 5
- Receptions: 40
- Receiving yards: 274
- Receiving touchdowns: 1
- Stats at Pro Football Reference

Salvon Ahmed (born December 30, 1998) is an American professional football running back for the Chicago Bears of the National Football League (NFL). He played college football for the Washington Huskies, and was signed by the San Francisco 49ers after going unselected in the 2020 NFL draft.

== Early life ==
Ahmed attended Juanita High School in Kirkland, Washington He was named to the USA Today all-state team at defensive back. He rushed for 1,300 yards and 13 touchdowns as a senior despite being limited to just six games due to injury. He was also named to the Seattle Times all-area team as both a senior and junior. In high school, he also played basketball and ran track (sprints and jumps). A 4-star athlete recruit by 247Sports, Ahmed committed to play college football at Washington over offers from Notre Dame, Oregon, Stanford, USC, and Utah, among others.

== College career ==
As a true freshman in 2017, Ahmed played in all 13 games, recording 61 carries for 388 yards and three touchdowns, along with 13 receptions for 77 yards and 14 kick returns for 353 yards. He was the team's Co-Freshman of the Year and was named Honorable Mention All-Pac 12. As a sophomore, Ahmed played in 14 games (starting three), recording 104 carries for 608 yards and seven touchdowns, along with 21 receptions for 170 yards.

On July 25, 2019, Ahmed was named to preseason watch lists for the Paul Hornung Award. Ahmed became Washington's full-time starting running back as a junior in 2019 following Myles Gaskin departing for the NFL. In 12 games, all of which he started, Ahmed rushed for 1,020 yards and 11 touchdowns on 188 carries along with 16 receptions for 84 yards. He was named Honorable Mention All-Pac 12 for his efforts.

== Professional career ==
Pre-draft measurables
Height	Weight	Arm length	Hand span	Wingspan	40-yard dash	10-yard split	20-yard split	Vertical jump	Broad jump
5 ft 10 7/8 in (1.80 m)	197 lb (89 kg)	29 1/4 in (0.74 m)	8 3/4 in (0.22 m)	5 ft 11 5/8 in (1.82 m)	4.62 s	1.56 s	2.69 s	34.5 in (0.88 m)	10 ft 0 in (3.05 m)
All values from NFL Combine

=== San Francisco 49ers ===
Ahmed went undrafted in the 2020 NFL draft. He was signed by the San Francisco 49ers as an undrafted free agent on May 1, 2020, but was waived on August 25.

=== Miami Dolphins ===
On August 26, 2020, Ahmed was claimed off waivers by the Miami Dolphins. He was waived during final roster cuts on September 5, and signed to the practice squad two days later. On October 9, he was promoted to the active roster. In Week 9, he made his NFL debut against the Arizona Cardinals and had seven carries for 38 rushing yards. He earned his first start and scored his first professional rushing touchdown in 2020 against the Los Angeles Chargers. In Week 15 against the New England Patriots, Ahmed rushed for 122 yards and a touchdown during the 22–12 win.

On March 10, 2023, Ahmed re-signed with the Dolphins on a one-year contract.

On March 14, 2024, Ahmed re-signed for a fifth season with the Dolphins. On July 18, Ahmed was placed on the Active/Non-football injury or illness (NFI) list. He was waived on August 19.

=== Denver Broncos ===
On October 1, 2024, Ahmed was signed to the Denver Broncos' practice squad. On October 8, he was released by the Broncos.

=== Indianapolis Colts ===
On October 16, 2024, Ahmed signed with the Indianapolis Colts' practice squad. He signed a reserve/future contract with Indianapolis on January 6, 2025. On August 3, Ahmed suffered a severe ankle injury requiring him to be carted off the field in training camp due to a hip drop tackle. He spent the entirety of the 2025 season on injured reserve.

=== Chicago Bears ===
On May 21, 2026, Ahmed signed with the Chicago Bears. Ahmed was released by Chicago as a part of final roster cuts on August 30; he was re-signed to the team's practice squad the following day.

Ahmed was elevated to the active roster for the Bears' Week 9 game against the Tampa Bay Buccaneers. Although Roschon Johnson was the backup running back at the time, Ahmed received the second-string carries behind D'Andre Swift as he ran five times for 25 yards.

== NFL career statistics ==
Legend
**Bold**	Career high

=== Regular season ===
Year	Team	Games		Rushing					Receiving					Fumbles	
Year	Team	GP	GS	Att	Yds	Y/A	Lng	TD	Rec	Yds	Y/R	Lng	TD	Fum	Lost
2020	MIA	6	**4**	**75**	**319**	4.3	**31**	**3**	11	61	5.5	13	0	0	0
2021	MIA	**12**	0	54	149	2.8	16	0	12	**117**	**9.8**	18	0	0	0
2022	MIA	**12**	0	12	64	**5.3**	11	1	1	8	8.0	8	0	0	0
2023	MIA	8	0	22	61	2.8	10	1	**16**	88	5.5	**20**	**1**	0	0
Career		38	4	163	593	3.6	31	5	40	274	6.9	20	1	0	0

=== Postseason ===
Year	Team	Games		Rushing					Receiving					Fumbles	
Year	Team	GP	GS	Att	Yds	Avg	Lng	TD	Rec	Yds	Avg	Lng	TD	Fum	Lost
2022	MIA	1	0	5	3	0.6	6	0	3	45	15.0	20	0	0	0
Career		1	0	5	3	0.6	6	0	3	45	15.0	20	0	0	0

== Personal life ==
While in college, Ahmed put together a rap album with his friends called A Safehouse Summer. The album consisted of six original songs that Ahmed wrote and recorded. His favorite artist is Tupac. He has him tattooed on his arm and he has Nipsey Hussle tattooed on his leg.
