= Bush Hamdan =

American football player and coach (born 1986)

Miami Dolphins
- Title: Quarterbacks coach

Personal information
- Born: February 10, 1986 (age 40); Kuwait City, Kuwait
- Listed height: 6 ft 0 in (1.83 m)
- Listed weight: 191 lb (87 kg)

Career information
- Position: Quarterback (No. 3)
- High school: Bishop O'Connell
- College: Boise State (2004–2008)

Career history
- Colorado (2009) Student assistant; Maryland (2010) Offensive coaching intern; Sacramento State (2011) Tight ends coach; Florida (2012) Wide receivers coach; Arkansas State (2013) Co-offensive coordinator & quarterbacks coach; Davidson (2014) Offensive coordinator & quarterbacks coach; Washington (2015–2016); Offensive quality control coach (2015); Wide receivers coach & passing game coordinator (2016); Atlanta Falcons (2017) Quarterbacks coach; Washington (2018–2019) Offensive coordinator & quarterbacks coach; Missouri (2020–2022); Wide receivers coach & quarterbacks coach (2020–2021); Quarterbacks coach (2022); Boise State (2023) Offensive coordinator & quarterbacks coach; Kentucky (2024–2025) Offensive coordinator & quarterbacks coach; Miami Dolphins (2026–present) Quarterbacks coach

Bush Hamdan (born February 10, 1986) is an American professional football coach and former quarterback who is currently the quarterbacks coach for the Miami Dolphins of the National Football League (NFL). He played college football at Boise State, but never played professionally. He previously held multiple offensive coaching positions at various colleges, with his last position being the offensive coordinator and quarterbacks coach at the University of Kentucky.

== Playing career ==
Hamdan was a quarterback at Boise State from 2004 to 2008. He graduated from Boise State in 2008 with a degree in communications.

== Coaching career ==
After his playing career ended, he joined the coaching staff at Colorado in 2009 as a student assistant. He also had stints at Maryland, Sacramento State, and Florida before his first coordinator job.

He was named the co-offensive coordinator and quarterbacks coach at Arkansas State in 2013, reuniting with his offensive coordinator and position coach in college, Bryan Harsin. He was not one of the assistants brought over to Boise State when Harsin was named the head coach of the program in 2014, and instead accepted a position as the offensive coordinator and quarterbacks coach at Davidson College in 2014.

Hamdan joined the coaching staff at Washington in 2015 as a quality control coach before being promoted to wide receivers coach and passing game coordinator in 2016. He spent 2017 with the Atlanta Falcons as their quarterbacks coach before rejoining the coaching staff at Washington in 2018 as the Huskies offensive coordinator & quarterbacks coach. He was fired on December 22, 2019, hours after the team's victory in the Las Vegas Bowl.

Hamdan was named to Eliah Drinkwitz's coaching staff at Missouri in 2020.

Hamdan was hired as the OC of his alma mater Boise State's football team in December 2022.

Hamdan was hired as the offensive coordinator and quarterbacks coach of the Kentucky Wildcats football team on February 14, 2024.

On December 10, 2025, Mississippi State head coach Jeff Lebby announced the addition of Bush Hamdan as associate head coach for offense.

On February 13, 2026, the Miami Dolphins hired Hamdan as their quarterbacks coach under new head coach, Jeff Hafley.

== Personal life ==
Born in Kuwait City, Hamdan is of Palestinian descent and his mother was from Pakistan. He and his family lived in Kuwait and were on vacation in San Diego when Iraq invaded Kuwait in 1991. The Hamdans stayed in the United States and eventually settled in Gaithersburg, Maryland. Hamdan's brother Gibran was a seventh round draft selection in the 2003 NFL draft and was a journeyman quarterback throughout his career.
