= Tuli Letuligasenoa =

American football player (born 2000)

Profile
- Position: Defensive end

Personal information
- Born: June 9, 2000 (age 26); Concord, California, U.S.
- Listed height: 6 ft 1 in (1.85 m)
- Listed weight: 287 lb (130 kg)

Career information
- High school: De La Salle (Concord)
- College: Washington (2018–2023)
- NFL draft: 2024: undrafted

Career history
- Los Angeles Rams (2024)*
- * Offseason or practice squad member only

Tuli Letuligasenoa (born June 9, 2000) is an American professional football defensive end. He played college football for the Washington Huskies.

== Early life ==
Coming out of high school, Letuligasenoa was rated as a four star recruit, the 13th best defensive tackle, and the 124th overall player in the class of 2019. Letuligasenoa also held offers from schools such as Oregon, UCLA, USC, and Washington. Ultimately, Letuligasenoa committed to play college football for the USC Trojans. However, Letuligasenoa decided to de-commit from the Trojans, and commit to play for the Washington Huskies.

== College career ==
In Letuligasenoa's first two seasons in 2019 and 2020, he totaled 28 tackles with three being for a loss, and a sack. In week seven of the 2021 season, Letuligasenoa recorded his first career interception versus Arizona. Letuligasenoa finished his breakout 2021 season tallying 36 tackles with six and a half being for a loss, a sack, two pass deflections, and an interception. For his performance in the 2021 season, Letuligasenoa was named an honorable mention all PAC-12 selection. In week five of the 2022 season, Letuligasenoa recorded three tackles and two pass deflections in a loss to UCLA. During the 2022 season, Letuligasenoa started in 11 games where he notched 30 tackles with four and a half being for a loss, and four pass deflections. In Letuligasenoa's final collegiate season in 2023 he recorded 19 tackles with three and a half being for a loss, and two pass deflections, while also helping Washington to reach the National Championship, where he would start in a loss to Michigan.

== Professional career ==
Pre-draft measurables
Height	Weight	Arm length	Hand span	40-yard dash	10-yard split	20-yard split	20-yard shuttle	Three-cone drill	Vertical jump	Broad jump	Bench press
6 ft 1 1/4 in (1.86 m)	295 lb (134 kg)	31 7/8 in (0.81 m)	9 3/8 in (0.24 m)	5.34 s	1.80 s	3.04 s	4.84 s	7.97 s	27.5 in (0.70 m)	8 ft 11 in (2.72 m)	24 reps
All values from Pro Day

After not being selected in the 2024 NFL draft, Letuligasenoa decided to sign with the Los Angeles Rams as an undrafted free agent. He was waived on August 27, and re-signed to the practice squad, but released the next day.
