= Hunter Bryant =

American football player (born 1998)

No. 86
- Position: Tight end

Personal information
- Born: August 20, 1998 (age 28); Issaquah, Washington, U.S.
- Listed height: 6 ft 2 in (1.88 m)
- Listed weight: 245 lb (111 kg)

Career information
- High school: Eastside Catholic (Sammamish, Washington)
- College: Washington
- NFL draft: 2020: undrafted

Career history
- Detroit Lions (2020–2021)

Awards and highlights
- First team All-Pac-12 (2019)

Career NFL statistics
- Receptions: 1
- Receiving yards: 44
- Stats at Pro Football Reference

Hunter Bryant (born August 20, 1998) is an American former professional football player who was a tight end for the Detroit Lions of the National Football League (NFL). He played college football for the Washington Huskies.

== Early life ==
Bryant attended Eastside Catholic School in Sammamish, Washington. During his high school career he caught 138 passes for 2,483 yards and 35 touchdowns. He committed to the University of Washington to play college football.

== College career ==
As a true freshman at Washington, Bryant played in nine games with five starts. He finished the season with 22 receptions for 331 yards and a touchdown. As a sophomore in 2018, he played in only five games because of injury. He recorded 11 receptions for 238 yards and one touchdown. Bryant returned from the injury in 2019. Following the 2019 where he was named to the first-team All-Pac-12, Bryant announced that he would forgo his senior season and declared for the 2020 NFL draft.

== Professional career ==
After going undrafted in the 2020 NFL draft, Bryant was signed by the Detroit Lions. Despite a hamstring injury limiting him in training camp, Bryant made the Lions 53-man roster. After recovering from the injury, he then suffered a concussion in practice and was placed on injured reserve on October 16, 2020. Bryant was activated on December 2.

Bryant was waived by the Lions on April 28, 2021, with a failed physical designation, and reverted to the team's non-football injury list the next day.

Bryant was waived by the Lions on April 27, 2022. Shortly thereafter, Bryant retired from professional football.
