= 2018 UCLA Bruins football team =

American college football season

2018 UCLA Bruins football
- Conference: Pac-12 Conference
- South Division
- Record: 3–9 (3–6 Pac-12)
- Head coach: Chip Kelly (1st season)
- Offensive scheme: Spread option
- Defensive coordinator: Jerry Azzinaro (1st season)
- Base defense: 4–2–5
- Home stadium: Rose Bowl

Uniform
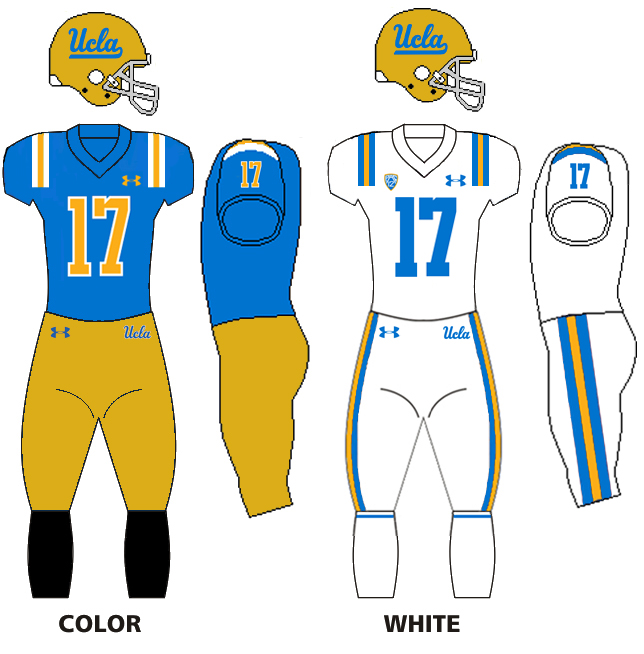

2018 Pac-12 Conference football standings
	Conf.			Overall
Team	W		L	W		L
North Division
No. 13 Washington xy$	7	–	2	10	–	4
No. 10 Washington State x	7	–	2	11	–	2
Stanford	6	–	3	9	–	4
Oregon	5	–	4	9	–	4
California	4	–	5	7	–	6
Oregon State	1	–	8	2	–	10
South Division
Utah xy	6	–	3	9	–	5
Arizona State	5	–	4	7	–	6
USC	4	–	5	5	–	7
Arizona	4	–	5	5	–	7
UCLA	3	–	6	3	–	9
Colorado	2	–	7	5	–	7
Championship: Washington 10, Utah 3
$ – Conference champion; x – Division champion/co-champions; y – Championship game participant; Rankings from AP Poll

The 2018 UCLA Bruins football team represented the University of California, Los Angeles in the 2018 NCAA Division I FBS football season. The Bruins were led by first-year head coach Chip Kelly and played their home games at the Rose Bowl. UCLA was a member of the Pac-12 Conference in the South Division. They began the season 0–4 for the first time since 1971, and 0–5 for the first time since 1943, before finally winning their first game, in dominating fashion, against Cal. However, despite failing to improve upon their previous season's output of six wins and seven losses and failing to qualify for a bowl game, the Bruins later defeated the USC Trojans to end a three-game losing streak in their crosstown rivalry. The Bruins finished 3–9 overall, their worst record since 1971. They went 3–6 in Pac-12 play, finishing fifth in the South Division, and were outscored by their opponents by a combined score of 409 to 295. UCLA's average home attendance of 51,164 was the school's smallest since averaging 49,825 in 1999.

== Departures ==
=== NFL Draft selections ===
The Bruins had five individuals selected in the 2018 NFL draft.

Player	Position	Round	Overall	NFL team
Josh Rosen	Quarterback	1	10	Arizona Cardinals
Kolton Miller	Tackle	1	15	Oakland Raiders
Kenny Young	Linebacker	4	122	Baltimore Ravens
Scott Quessenberry	Center	5	155	Los Angeles Chargers
Jordan Lasley	Wide receiver	5	162	Baltimore Ravens

== Preseason ==
=== Award watch lists ===
Listed in the order that they were released

Award	Player	Position	Year
Lott Trophy	Adarius Pickett	DB	JR
John Mackey Award	Caleb Wilson	TE	JR
Lou Groza Award	JJ Molson	K	JR
Ray Guy Award	Stefan Flintoft	P	JR
Paul Hornung Award	Darnay Holmes	DB/KR	SO
Earl Campbell Tyler Rose Award	Caleb Wilson	TE	SR

=== Pac-12 media days ===
The 2018 Pac-12 media day was July 25, 2018 in Hollywood, California. The Pac-12 media poll was released with the Bruins predicted to finish in fourth place at Pac-12 South division.

== Recruiting ==
=== Recruits ===
The Bruins signed a total of 27 recruits.

College recruiting (2018)
Name	Hometown	School	Height	Weight	Commit date
Kyle Philips; WR	San Marcos, California	San Marcos High School	5 ft 11 in (1.80 m)	176 lb (80 kg)	Apr 21, 2017
Kyle Philips; WR	Recruit ratings: Scout: Rivals: 247Sports: ESPN:				
Dorian Thompson-Robinson; QB	Las Vegas, Nevada	Bishop Gorman High School	6 ft 2 in (1.88 m)	194 lb (88 kg)	Apr 23, 2017
Dorian Thompson-Robinson; QB	Recruit ratings: Scout: Rivals: 247Sports: ESPN:				
Stephan Blaylock; S	Bellflower, California	St. John Bosco High School	5 ft 10 in (1.78 m)	185 lb (84 kg)	May 5, 2017
Stephan Blaylock; S	Recruit ratings: Scout: Rivals: 247Sports: ESPN:				
Kazmeir Allen; RB	Tulare, California	Tulare Union High School	5 ft 8 in (1.73 m)	185 lb (84 kg)	Nov 29, 2017
Kazmeir Allen; RB	Recruit ratings: Scout: Rivals: 247Sports: ESPN:				
Alec Anderson; OT	Rancho Cucamonga, California	Etiwanda High School	6 ft 5 in (1.96 m)	283 lb (128 kg)	Dec 3, 2017
Alec Anderson; OT	Recruit ratings: Scout: Rivals: 247Sports: ESPN:				
Bryan Addison; WR	Gardena, California	Junípero Serra High School	6 ft 5 in (1.96 m)	180 lb (82 kg)	Dec 10, 2017
Bryan Addison; WR	Recruit ratings: Scout: Rivals: 247Sports: ESPN:				
Chase Cota; WR	Medford, Oregon	South Medford High School	6 ft 4 in (1.93 m)	195 lb (88 kg)	Dec 13, 2017
Chase Cota; WR	Recruit ratings: Scout: Rivals: 247Sports: ESPN:				
Bo Calvert; LB	Westlake Village, California	Oaks Christian High School	6 ft 4 in (1.93 m)	209 lb (95 kg)	Dec 18, 2017
Bo Calvert; LB	Recruit ratings: Scout: Rivals: 247Sports: ESPN:				
Atonio Mafi; DT	San Mateo, California	Junípero Serra High School	6 ft 3 in (1.91 m)	380 lb (170 kg)	Dec 20, 2017
Atonio Mafi; DT	Recruit ratings: Scout: Rivals: 247Sports: ESPN:				
Chris Murray; OG	Santa Ana, California	Mater Dei High School	6 ft 3 in (1.91 m)	300 lb (140 kg)	Feb 6, 2018
Chris Murray; OG	Recruit ratings: Scout: Rivals: 247Sports: ESPN:				
Martell Irby; RB	San Diego, California	Morse High School	5 ft 9 in (1.75 m)	204 lb (93 kg)	Feb 7, 2018
Martell Irby; RB	Recruit ratings: Scout: Rivals: 247Sports: ESPN:				
Baraka Beckett; DE	Los Angeles, California	Palisades Charter High School	6 ft 4 in (1.93 m)	280 lb (130 kg)	Jan 14, 2018
Baraka Beckett; DE	Recruit ratings: Scout: Rivals: 247Sports: ESPN:				
Patrick Jolly; WR	Lithia, Florida	Newsome High School	6 ft 1 in (1.85 m)	177 lb (80 kg)	Feb 21, 2018
Patrick Jolly; WR	Recruit ratings: Scout: Rivals: 247Sports: ESPN:				
Je'Vari Anderson; S	Concord, California	Laney College	6 ft 0 in (1.83 m)	220 lb (100 kg)	Jan 24, 2018
Je'Vari Anderson; S	Recruit ratings: Scout: Rivals: 247Sports: ESPN:				
Delon Hurt; WR	Anaheim, California	Servite High School	6 ft 0 in (1.83 m)	190 lb (86 kg)	Jan 24, 2018
Delon Hurt; WR	Recruit ratings: Scout: Rivals: 247Sports: ESPN:				
Kenny Churchwell; S	Phoenix, Arizona	Mountain Pointe High School	6 ft 2 in (1.88 m)	180 lb (82 kg)	Jan 26, 2018
Kenny Churchwell; S	Recruit ratings: Scout: Rivals: 247Sports:				
Elisha Guidry; CB	Murrieta, California	Vista Murrieta High School	6 ft 0 in (1.83 m)	173 lb (78 kg)	Jan 28, 2018
Elisha Guidry; CB	Recruit ratings: Scout: Rivals: 247Sports: ESPN:				
Elijah Wade; DE	Las Vegas, Nevada	Arbor View High School	6 ft 5 in (1.96 m)	240 lb (110 kg)	Jan 28, 2018
Elijah Wade; DE	Recruit ratings: Scout: Rivals: 247Sports: ESPN:				
Matt Alaimo; TE	Montvale, New Jersey	St. Joseph Regional High School	6 ft 5 in (1.96 m)	235 lb (107 kg)	Jan 31, 2018
Matt Alaimo; TE	Recruit ratings: Scout: Rivals: 247Sports: ESPN:				
Steven Mason; DE	Encinitas, California	Southwestern College	6 ft 8 in (2.03 m)	250 lb (110 kg)	Feb 1, 2018
Steven Mason; DE	Recruit ratings: Scout: Rivals: 247Sports: ESPN:				
Tyree Thompson; LB	Van Nuys, California	Los Angeles Valley College	6 ft 3 in (1.91 m)	235 lb (107 kg)	Feb 3, 2018
Tyree Thompson; LB	Recruit ratings: Scout: Rivals: 247Sports: ESPN:				
Tyler Manoa; DT	La Canada, California	Saint Francis High School	6 ft 5 in (1.96 m)	260 lb (120 kg)	Feb 3, 2018
Tyler Manoa; DT	Recruit ratings: Scout: Rivals: 247Sports: ESPN:				
David Priebe; TE	Waco, Texas	Midway High School	6 ft 6 in (1.98 m)	212 lb (96 kg)	Feb 5, 2018
David Priebe; TE	Recruit ratings: Scout: Rivals: 247Sports: ESPN:				
Jon Gaines II; OT	Milwaukee, Wisconsin	Marquette University High School	6 ft 5 in (1.96 m)	270 lb (120 kg)	Feb 5, 2018
Jon Gaines II; OT	Recruit ratings: Scout: Rivals: 247Sports: ESPN:				
Rayshad Williams; CB	Memphis, Tennessee	Whitehaven High School	6 ft 4 in (1.93 m)	183 lb (83 kg)	Feb 7, 2018
Rayshad Williams; CB	Recruit ratings: Scout: Rivals: 247Sports: ESPN:				
Otito Ogbonnia; DT	Katy, Texas	Taylor High School	6 ft 3 in (1.91 m)	300 lb (140 kg)	Feb 7, 2018
Otito Ogbonnia; DT	Recruit ratings: Scout: Rivals: 247Sports: ESPN:				
Michael Ezeike; WR	Ontario, California	Colony High School	6 ft 5 in (1.96 m)	220 lb (100 kg)	Feb 7, 2018
Michael Ezeike; WR	Recruit ratings: Scout: Rivals: 247Sports: ESPN:				
Overall recruit ranking:
Note: In many cases, Scout, Rivals, 247Sports, On3, and ESPN may conflict in their listings of height and weight.; In these cases, the average was taken. ESPN grades are on a 100-point scale.; Sources: "UCLA Football Commitments". Rivals.; "2018 Team Ranking". Rivals.com.

== Schedule ==
Date	Time	Opponent	Site	TV	Result	Attendance
September 1	4:00 p.m.	Cincinnati*	Rose Bowl; Pasadena, CA	ESPN	L 17–26	54,116
September 8	10:00 a.m.	at No. 6 Oklahoma*	Gaylord Family Oklahoma Memorial Stadium; Norman, OK	FOX	L 21–49	86,402
September 15	7:30 p.m.	Fresno State*	Rose Bowl; Pasadena, CA	FS1	L 14–38	60,867
September 28	6:00 p.m.	at Colorado	Folsom Field; Boulder, CO	FS1	L 16–38	46,814
October 6	4:30 p.m.	No. 10 Washington	Rose Bowl; Pasadena, CA	FOX	L 24–31	51,123
October 13	4:00 p.m.	at California	California Memorial Stadium; Berkeley, CA (rivalry)	P12N	W 37–7	45,889
October 20	7:30 p.m.	Arizona^{†}	Rose Bowl; Pasadena, CA	ESPN2	W 31–30	54,686
October 26	7:30 p.m.	No. 23 Utah	Rose Bowl; Pasadena, CA	ESPN	L 10–41	41,848
November 3	4:30 p.m.	at Oregon	Autzen Stadium; Eugene, OR	FOX	L 21–42	56,114
November 10	11:00 a.m.	at Arizona State	Sun Devil Stadium; Tempe, AZ	P12N	L 28–31	46,466
November 17	12:30 p.m.	USC	Rose Bowl; Pasadena, CA (Victory Bell)	FOX	W 34–27	57,116
November 24	12:00 p.m.	Stanford	Rose Bowl; Pasadena, CA (rivalry)	P12N	L 42–49	38,391
*Non-conference game; ^{†}Homecoming; Rankings from AP Poll released prior to the game; All times are in Pacific time

== Personnel ==
=== Coaching staff ===
Name	Position	Year at UCLA	Alma mater (year)
Chip Kelly	Head coach/offensive coordinator	1st	New Hampshire (1990)
Dana Bible	Quarterbacks coach	1st	Cincinnati (1976)
Jerry Azzinaro	Defensive coordinator	1st	American International College (1982)
DeShaun Foster	Running backs coach	2nd	UCLA (2002)
Jimmie Dougherty	Wide receivers/Passing game coordinator	2nd	Missouri (2001)
Vince Oghobaase	Defensive line coach	1st	Duke (2010)
Don Pellum	Linebackers coach	1st	Oregon (1985)
Paul Rhoads	Defensive backs coach	1st	Missouri Western (1988)
Roy Manning	Outside linebackers coach/special teams coordinator	1st	Michigan (2004)
Derek Sage	Tight ends coach	1st	Cal State Northridge (2003)
Justin Frye	Offensive line coach	1st	Indiana (2006)

=== Roster ===
2018 UCLA Bruins Roster
Quarterback: 3 Wilton Speight – Graduate Transfer; 7 Dorian Thompson-Robinson – Freshman; 12 Austin Burton – (redshirt) Freshman; 15 Matt Lynch – (redshirt) Sophomore; 17 Josiah Norwood – Freshman; 18 Devon Modster – (redshirt) Sophomore; Running back: 1 Soso Jamabo – Senior; 4 Bolu Olorunfunmi – Senior; 19 Kazmeir Allen – Freshman; 20 Brandon Stephens – Junior; 22 Kenroy Higgins II – Freshman; 26 Martell Irby – Freshman; 27 Joshua Kelley (redshirt) Junior; 28 Cole Kinder – (redshirt) Freshman; Receiver: 2 Kyle Philips – Freshman; 6 Stephen Johnson III – (redshirt) Junior; 9 Dymond Lee – (redshirt) Sophomore; 10 Demetric Felton – (redshirt) Sophomore; 11 Audie Omotosho – (redshirt) Sophomore; 14 Theo Howard – Junior; 17 Christian Pabico – (redshirt) Senior; 21 Michael Ezeike – Freshman; 23 Chase Cota – Freshman; 25 Antonio Brown – (redshirt) Freshman; 29 Delon Hurt – Freshman; 39 Ethan Fernea – Junior; Tight end: 33 Drew Platt – (redshirt) Freshman; 81 Caleb Wilson – (redshirt) Junior; 82 Matt Alaimo – Freshman; 83 David Priebe – Freshman; 85 Greg Dulcich – Freshman; 86 Devin Asiasi – (redshirt) Sophomore; 87 Jordan Wilson – (redshirt) Sophomore; 88 Connor Beadles – (redshirt) Freshman	Offensive lineman: 55 Michael Alves – (redshirt) Sophomore; 56 Josh Wariboko-Alali – (redshirt) Junior; 57 Jon Gaines II – Freshman; 60 Zack Sweeney – (redshirt) Freshman; 61 Bryan Weitzman – (redshirt) Sophomore; 64 Sam Marrazzo – (redshirt) Freshman; 65 Stephen DeFranco – Freshman; 66 Mohamed Khalil – Freshman; 70 Alec Anderson – Freshman; 71 Baraka Beckett – Freshman; 72 Zach Cochrun – (redshirt) Freshman; 73 Jake Burton – (redshirt) Sophomore; 74 Justin Murphy – Graduate Transfer; 75 Boss Tagaloa – Junior; 76 Christaphany Murray – Freshman; 77 Andre James – (redshirt) Junior; 78 Lucas Gramlick – Freshman; Defensive lineman: 44 Martin Andrus – Sophomore; 50 Tyler Manoa – Freshman; 51 Martin Andrus – Sophomore; 53 Winston Polite – Freshman; 55 Steven Mason – Junior; 56 Atonio Mafi – Freshman; 85 Moses Robinson-Carr – Sophomore; 90 Rick Wade – (redshirt) Junior; 91 Otito Ogbonnia – Freshman; 92 Osa Odighizuwa – (redshirt) Sophomore; 93 Chigozie Nnoruka – (redshirt) Junior; 95 Marcus Moore – (redshirt) Sophomore; 97 Odua Isibor – (redshirt) Freshman	Linebacker: 2 Josh Woods – Senior; 11 Keisean Lucier-South – (redshirt) Junior; 12 Rahyme Johnson – Sophomore; 14 Krys Barnes – Junior; 15 Jaelan Phillips – Sophomore; 25 Tyree Thompson – (redshirt) Junior; 26 Leni Toailoa – (redshirt) Sophomore; 32 Mique Juarez – (redshirt) Sophomore; 33 Bo Calvert – Freshman; 41 Jayce Smalley – (redshirt) Freshman; 43 Je'Vari Anderson – Junior; 46 Donovan Williams – (redshirt) Freshman; 48 Winston Anawalt – (redshirt) Freshman; 52 Lokeni Toailoa – Junior; Defensive back: 1 Darnay Holmes – Sophomore; 3 Rayshad Williams – Freshman; 4 Stephan Blaylock – Freshman; 6 Adarius Pickett – (redshirt) Senior; 7 Morrell Osling III – Sophomore; 9 Elijah Gates – (redshirt) Freshman; 10 Colin Samuel – (redshirt) Junior; 19 Alex Johnson – Freshman; 22 Nate Meadors – Senior; 23 Kenny Churchwell III – Freshman; 24 Jay Shaw – Sophomore; 27 Patrick Jolly – Freshman; 29 Ryan Parks – (redshirt) Freshman; 30 Elisha Guidry – Freshman; 31 Zack Huffstutter – Freshman; 35 Rahjae Johnson – Freshman; 37 Quentin Lake – Sophomore; 47 Shea Pitts – (redshirt) Freshman; Punter: 20 Stefan Flintoft – (redshirt) Senior; 49 Colin Flintoft – Freshman; Kicker: 15 Andrew Strauch – (redshirt) Junior; 17 JJ Molson – Junior; 21 Quintin Wallace – Freshman; Long snapper: 30 Johnny Den Bleyker – Junior; 58 Alex Michaelsen – (redshirt) Freshman; 58 Koby Walsh – (redshirt) Sophomore

== Game summaries ==
=== Cincinnati ===
Cincinnati Bearcats at UCLA Bruins

Quarter	1	2	3	4	Total
Bearcats	0	17	0	9	26
Bruins	10	0	7	0	17

at Rose Bowl, Pasadena, California

- Date: September 1, 2018
- Game time: 4:05 p.m. PDT
- Game weather: Clear, 85 °F (29 °C)
- Game attendance: 54,116
- Referee: Charles Lamerti
- TV announcers (ESPN): Bob Wischusen, Brock Huard, and Allison Williams
- Cincinnati spoils Chip Kelly's UCLA debut with 26-17 win, Game Book

Game information

First quarter

- UCLA – Bolu Olorunfunmi 1-yard run (J.J. Molson kick), 7:38. Bruins 7–0. 4 plays, 13 yards, 0:56.
- UCLA – J.J. Molson 47-yard field goal, 2:02. Bruins 10–0. 7 plays, 25 yards, 3:22.

Second quarter

- CIN – Michael Warren II 1-yard run (Cole Smith kick), 10:02. Bruins 10–7. 14 plays, 75 yards, 7:00.
- CIN – Michael Warren II 1-yard run (Cole Smith kick), 6:57. Bearcats 14–10. 7 plays, 27 yards, 3:00.
- CIN – Cole Smith 24-yard field goal, 0:20. Bearcats 17–10. 9 plays, 80 yards, 1:59.

Third quarter

- UCLA – Kazmeir Allen 74-yard run (J.J. Molson kick), 12:49. Tie 17–17. 2 plays, 78 yards, 1:04.

Fourth quarter

- CIN – Team safety, 9:45. Bearcats 19–17. 1 play, -12 yards, 0:00.
- CIN – Michael Warren 1-yard run (Cole Smith kick), 1:44. Bearcats 26–17. 9 plays, 36 yards, 4:02.

Passing

- CIN – Desmond Ridder – 13/24, 100 yards
- UCLA – Dorian Thompson-Robinson – 15/25, 117 yards

Rushing

- CIN – Michael Warren II – 35 rushes, 142 yards, 3 TD
- UCLA – Kazmeir Allen – 5 rushes, 103 yards, 1 TD

Receiving

- CIN – Michael Warren II – 3 receptions, 29 yards
- UCLA – Theo Howard – 5 receptions, 52 yards

Although favored by two touchdowns over the Bearcats, the Chip Kelly era at UCLA got off to a disappointing start with the loss vs. Cincinnati. Despite jumping out to an early 10–0 lead after one quarter of play, UCLA was slowed by the Bearcats for most of the remainder of the game. There was some brilliance rushing the ball by freshman running back Kazmeir Allen, who scored a 74-yard touchdown in the 3rd, but the pass game never seemed to click (with only 162 yards in the air and no touchdowns passing), several receivers dropped critical passes, and the offense struggled for the majority of the game. Additionally, starting quarterback Wilton Speight suffered a back injury in the 2nd quarter and had to be replaced with true freshman Dorian Thompson-Robinson.

A fumble by Thompson-Robinson deep in UCLA's own territory in the 4th quarter led to a costly safety, which ultimately swung the game in favor of Cincy. Meanwhile, Cincinnati's offense, led by a freshman Desmond Ridder at quarterback after starting signal-caller Hayden Moore went off with an early injury, had fewer total yards (304 against UCLA's 306) than the Bruins but dominated time of possession. The "nail in the coffin" for UCLA was perhaps a penalty for 12 men on the field against the Bruin defense, which came on 4th down during a critical goal line stand; this allowed Cincinnati to eventually score a touchdown rather than kick a field goal.

In all, the UCLA team was too inconsistent on the day and made too many crucial blunders to get the win against a talented Bearcats team that, though initially projected at the beginning of the year to be rather weak, would actually go on to win 10 games. After the game, Coach Kelly said in an interview that he intended to remain positive despite the loss.

=== At Oklahoma ===
UCLA Bruins at No. 6 Oklahoma Sooners

Quarter	1	2	3	4	Total
Bruins	7	0	0	14	21
No. 6 Sooners	14	7	14	14	49

at Gaylord Family Oklahoma Memorial Stadium, Norman, Oklahoma

- Date: September 8, 2018
- Game time: 12:05 p.m. CDT
- Game weather: Cloudy, 70 °F (21 °C)
- Game attendance: 86,402
- Referee: Mike Mothershed
- TV announcers (FOX): Gus Johnson, Joel Klatt, and Jenny Taft
- Murray's 5 total TDs lead No. 6 Oklahoma past UCLA 49-21, Game Book

Game information

First quarter

- UCLA – Bolu Olorunfunmi 3-yard run (J.J. Molson Kick), 8:59. Bruins 7–0. Drive: 7 plays, 80 yards, 2:20.
- OKLA – Rodney Anderson 3-yard run (Austin Seibert Kick), 7:20. Tie 7–7. Drive: 3 plays, 12 yards, 1:39.
- OKLA – Marquise Brown 58-yard pass from Kyler Murray (Austin Seibert Kick), 3:17. Sooners 14–7. Drive: 4 plays, 72 yards, 2:00.

Second quarter

- OKLA – Kyler Murray 10-yard run (Austin Seibert Kick), 14:55. Sooners 21–7. Drive: 7 plays, 85 yards, 1:45.

Third quarter

- OKLA – Marcelias Sutton 11-yard run (Austin Seibert Kick), 7:34. Sooners 28–7. Drive: 8 plays, 80 yards, 2:27.
- OKLA – A.D. Miller 10-yard pass from Kyler Murray (Austin Seibert Kick), 5:19. Sooners 35–7. Drive: 2 plays, 11 yards, 0:46.

Fourth quarter

- OKLA – CeeDee Lamb 35-yard pass from Kyler Murray (Austin Seibert Kick), 13:27. Sooners 42–7. Drive: 7 plays, 62 yards, 2:29.
- UCLA – Bolu Olorunfunmi 2-yard run (J.J. Molson Kick), 11:11. Sooners 42–14. Drive: 6 plays, 75 yards, 2:16.
- OKLA – Kyler Murray 2-yard run (Austin Seibert Kick), 7:40. Sooners 49–14. Drive: 6 plays, 65 yards, 3:31.
- UCLA – Michael Ezeike 9-yard pass from Dorian Thompson (J.J. Molson Kick), 3:44. Sooners 49–21. Drive: 13 plays, 85 yards, 3:56.

Passing

- UCLA – Dorian Thompson-Robinson – 16/26, 254 yards, 1 TD
- OKLA – Kyler Murray – 19/33, 306 yards, 3 TD, 1 INT

Rushing

- UCLA – Bolu Olorunfunmi – 15 rushes, 56 yards, 2 TD
- OKLA – Kyler Murray – 10 rushes, 69 yards, 2 TD

Receiving

- UCLA – Caleb Wilson – 4 receptions, 92 yards
- OKLA – CeeDee Lamb – 7 receptions, 146 yards, 1 TD

=== Fresno State ===
Fresno State Bulldogs at UCLA Bruins

Quarter	1	2	3	4	Total
Bulldogs	13	3	15	7	38
Bruins	0	7	7	0	14

at Rose Bowl, Pasadena, California

- Date: September 15, 2018
- Game time: 7:35 p.m. PDT
- Game weather: Clear, 79 °F (26 °C)
- Game attendance: 60,867
- Referee: Mark Duddy
- TV announcers (FS1): Justin Kutcher, DeMarco Murray, and Petros Papadakis
- McMaryion scores 4 touchdowns to lead Fresno State over UCLA, Game Book

Game information

First quarter

- FRES – Marcus McMaryion 1-yard run, 10:03. Bulldogs 6–0. Drive: 13 plays, 75 yards, 4:57.
- FRES – Kyle Riddering 10-yard pass from Marcus McMaryion (Asa Fuller Kick), 3:41. Bulldogs 13–0. Drive: 8 plays, 75 yards, 3:52.

Second quarter

- FRES – Asa Fuller 28-yard field goal, 14:17. Bulldogs 16–0. Drive: 6 plays, 27 yards, 2:02.
- UCLA – Theo Howard 45-yard pass from Dorian Thompson (J.J. Molson Kick), 9:44. Bulldogs 16–7. Drive: 5 plays, 43 yards, 1:38.

Third quarter

- UCLA – Bolo Olorunfunmi 2-yard run (J.J. Molson Kick), 12:59. Bulldogs 16–14. Drive: 3 plays, 17 yards, 1:09.
- FRES – Marcus McMaryion 1-yard run (Two-point conversion), 6:29. Bulldogs 24–14. Drive: 8 plays, 73 yards, 3:16.
- FRES – Marcus McMaryion 1-yard run (Asa Fuller Kick), 3:43. Bulldogs 31–14. Drive: 5 plays, 51 yards, 2:20.

Fourth quarter

- FRES – Marcus McMaryion 2-yard run (Asa Fuller Kick), 13:04. Bulldogs 38–14. Drive: 7 plays, 55 yards, 3:12.

Passing

- FRES – Marcus McMaryion – 22/33, 270 yards, 1 TD
- UCLA – Dorian Thompson-Robinson – 10/24, 151 yards, 1 TD, 2 INT

Rushing

- FRES – Jordan Mims – 21 rushes, 85 yards
- UCLA – Dorian Thompson – 8 rushes, 49 yards

Receiving

- FRES – KeeSean Johnson – 8 receptions, 85 yards
- UCLA – Theo Howard – 4 receptions, 80 yards, 1 TD

=== At Colorado ===
UCLA Bruins at Colorado Buffaloes

Quarter	1	2	3	4	Total
Bruins	10	3	3	0	16
Buffaloes	7	7	14	10	38

at Folsom Field, Boulder, Colorado

- Date: September 28, 2018
- Game time: 7:05 p.m. MDT
- Game weather: Cloudy, 46 °F (8 °C)
- Game attendance: 46,814
- Referee: Mike McCabe
- TV announcers (FS1): Brian Custer and Ben Leber
- Montez has 3 TDs as Buffs beat Bruins 38-16, Game Book

Game information

First quarter

- UCLA – Michael Ezeike 11-yard pass from Dorian Thompson (J.J. Molson Kick), 7:26. Bruins 7–0. Drive: 8 plays, 47 yards, 4:29.
- COLO – Laviska Shenault 57-yard pass from Steven Montez (James Stefanou Kick), 5:00. Tie 7–7. Drive: 5 plays, 85 yards, 2:20.
- UCLA – J.J. Molson 21-yard field goal, 0:57. Bruins 10–7. Drive: 11 plays, 71 yards, 4:03.

Second quarter

- COLO – Steven Montez 10-yard run (James Stefanou Kick), 6:13. Buffaloes 14–10. Drive: 12 plays, 80 yards, 5:51.
- UCLA – J.J. Molson 50-yard field goal, 1:40. Buffaloes 14–13. Drive: 11 plays, 42 yards, 4:33.

Third quarter

- UCLA – J.J. Molson 40-yard field goal, 10:36. Bruins 16–14. Drive: 6 plays, 66 yards, 2:01.
- COLO – Laviska Shenault 1-yard run (James Stefanou Kick), 7:45. Buffaloes 21–16. Drive: 7 plays, 75 yards, 2:51.
- COLO – Travon McMillian 6-yard run (James Stefanou Kick), 1:04. Buffaloes 28–16. Drive: 13 plays, 67 yards, 5:45.

Fourth quarter

- COLO – James Stefanou 41-yard field goal, 11:46. Buffaloes 31–16. Drive: 6 plays, 51 yards, 2:59.
- COLO – Steven Montez 35-yard run (James Stefanou Kick), 7:15. Buffaloes 38–16. Drive: 5 plays, 63 yards, 3:01.

Passing

- UCLA – Dorian Thompson-Robinson – 17/35, 138 yards, 1 TD
- COLO – Steven Montez – 22/26, 237 yards, 1 TD

Rushing

- UCLA – Joshua Kelley – 12 rushes, 124 yards
- COLO – Travon McMillian – 21 rushes, 102 yards, 1 TD

Receiving

- UCLA – Demetric Felton – 3 receptions, 49 yards
- COLO – Laviska Shenault – 12 receptions, 126 yards, 1 TD

Yet another disappointing Bruins loss led to UCLA equaling their worst start (0-4) since 1971, despite signs of improvement in the 1st half. Another lackluster performance by starting quarterback Dorian Thompson-Robinson led to many calling for the true freshman to be benched by Coach Kelly.

=== Washington ===
No. 10 Washington Huskies at UCLA Bruins

Quarter	1	2	3	4	Total
No. 10 Huskies	7	17	0	7	31
Bruins	0	7	3	14	24

at Rose Bowl, Pasadena, California

- Date: October 6, 2018
- Game time: 4:45 p.m. PDT
- Game weather: Cloudy, 76 °F (24 °C)
- Game attendance: 51,123
- Referee: Mike McCabe
- TV announcers (FOX): Brian Custer, Ben Leber, and Jen Hale
- Gaskin runs for 2 TDs, No. 10 Washington beats UCLA 31-24, Game Book

Game information

First quarter

- WASH – Aaron Fuller 25-yard pass from Jake Browning (Peyton Henry Kick), 1:37. Huskies 7–0. Drive: 5 plays, 62 yards, 2:20.

Second quarter

- WASH – Peyton Henry 26-yard field goal, 11:45. Huskies 10–0. Drive: 7 plays, 61 yards, 3:02.
- UCLA – Theo Howard 9-yard pass from Dorian Thompson (J.J. Molson Kick), 9:47. Huskies 10–7. Drive: 6 plays, 75 yards, 1:58.
- WASH – Myles Gaskin 1-yard run (Peyton Henry Kick), 4:42. Huskies 17–7. Drive: 11 plays, 74 yards, 5:05.
- WASH – Jake Browning 1-yard run (Peyton Henry Kick), 0:33. Huskies 24–7. Drive: 10 plays, 77 yards, 3:19.

Third quarter

- UCLA – J.J. Molson 49-yard field goal, 9:46. Huskies 24–10. Drive: 12 plays, 42 yards, 5:14.

Fourth quarter

- UCLA – Caleb Wilson 9-yard pass from Dorian Thompson (J.J. Molson Kick), 14:53. Huskies 24–17. Drive: 17 plays, 90 yards, 6:01.
- WASH – Myles Gaskin 2-yard run (Peyton Henry Kick), 3:42. Huskies 31–17. Drive: 12 plays, 81 yards, 6:45.
- UCLA – Joshua Kelley 2-yard run (J.J. Molson Kick), 1:38. Huskies 31–24. Drive: 9 plays, 75 yards, 2:04.

Passing

- WASH – Jake Browning – 18/26, 265 yards, 1 TD, 1 INT
- UCLA – Dorian Thompson-Robinson – 27/38, 272 yards, 2 TD, 1 INT

Rushing

- WASH – Myles Gaskin – 27 rushes, 116 yards, 2 TD
- UCLA – Joshua Kelley – 20 rushes, 125 yards, 1 TD

Receiving

- WASH – Aaron Fuller – 5 receptions, 100 yards, 1 TD
- UCLA – Caleb Wilson – 8 receptions, 102 yards, 1 TD

UCLA came close to upsetting the #10-ranked Huskies, but ultimately fell short as they started a season winless through 5 games for the first time since 1943.

=== At California ===
89th rivalry meeting: UCLA Bruins at California Golden Bears

Quarter	1	2	3	4	Total
Bruins	7	6	7	17	37
Golden Bears	0	0	7	0	7

at California Memorial Stadium, Berkeley, California

- Date: October 13, 2018
- Game time: 4:07 p.m. PDT
- Game weather: Clear, 66 °F (19 °C)
- Game attendance: 45,889
- Referee: Chris Coyte
- TV announcers (P12N): Ted Robinson, Yogi Roth, and Jill Savage
- Chip Kelly gets 1st win at UCLA, 37-7 over California, Game Book

Game information

First quarter

- UCLA – Joshua Kelley 5-yard run (J.J. Molson Kick), 2:18. Bruins 7–0. Drive: 9 plays, 59 yards, 4:18.

Second quarter

- UCLA – J.J. Molson 25-yard field goal, 10:32. Bruins 10–0. Drive: 10 plays, 79 yards, 4:40.
- UCLA – J.J. Molson 29-yard field goal, 5:07. Bruins 13–0. Drive: 9 plays, 26 yards, 3:17.

Third quarter

- CAL – Patrick Laird 1-yard run (Greg Thomas Kick), 8:38. Bruins 13–7. Drive: 12 plays, 75 yards, 6:22.
- UCLA – Joshua Kelley 1-yard run (J.J. Molson Kick), 6:03. Bruins 20–7. Drive: 6 plays, 83 yards, 2:30.

Fourth quarter

- UCLA – Joshua Kelley 1-yard run (J.J. Molson Kick), 13:36. Bruins 27–7. Drive: 11 plays, 52 yards, 4:35.
- UCLA – J.J. Molson 42-yard field goal, 7:04. Bruins 30–7. Drive: 4 plays, 5 yards, 2:27.
- UCLA – Keisean Lucier-South 38-yard fumble return (J.J. Molson Kick), 5:58. Bruins 37–7. Drive: 5 plays, 8 yards, 1:00.

Passing

- UCLA – Dorian Thompson-Robinson – 13/15, 141 yards
- CAL – Brandon McIlwain – 22/40, 168 yards, 2 INT

Rushing

- UCLA – Joshua Kelley – 30 rushes, 157 yards, 3 TD
- CAL – Patrick Laird – 17 rushes, 94 yards, 1 TD

Receiving

- UCLA – Caleb Wilson – 5 receptions, 92 yards
- CAL – Jeremiah Hawkins – 4 receptions, 49 yards

Giving reason for optimism to both players and fans alike, the Bruins finally earned their first victory of the season by manhandling Cal on the road, 37–7. Digging in, UCLA's defense was stout, forcing 5 turnovers (on 2 interceptions of Cal quarterback Brandon McIlwain and 3 fumble recoveries, including one that was run back for a touchdown by Keisean Lucier-South) while not surrendering any turnovers on offense themselves. Bruin running back Joshua Kelley also had a tremendous game, continuing his hot streak by scoring 3 touchdowns while rushing for an impressive 157 yards on 30 carries.

A Bruin victory at California Memorial Stadium also marked UCLA's first true road win in over two years, dating back to their 17–14 triumph over Brigham Young in 2016.

=== Arizona ===
Arizona Wildcats at UCLA Bruins

Quarter	1	2	3	4	Total
Wildcats	0	7	13	10	30
Bruins	7	10	7	7	31

at Rose Bowl, Pasadena, California

- Date: October 20, 2018
- Game time: 7:35 p.m. PDT
- Game weather: Clear, 76 °F (24 °C)
- Game attendance: 54,686
- Referee: Jay Edwards
- TV announcers (ESPN2): Roy Philpott, Tom Ramsey, and Edward Aschoff
- Speight throws 2 touchdown passes to lead UCLA over Arizona, Game Book

Game information

First quarter

- UCLA – Kazmeir Allen 16-yard pass from Dorian Thompson (J.J. Molson Kick), 9:51. Bruins 7–0. Drive: 9 plays, 62 yard, 4:11.

Second quarter

- UCLA – J.J. Molson 40-yard field goal, 14:56. Bruins 10–0. Drive: 7 plays, 53 yards, 3:22.
- ARIZ – Shawn Poindexter 13-yard pass from Rhett Rodriguez (Josh Pollack Kick), 6:38. Bruins 10–7. Drive: 5 plays, 71 yards, 2:00.
- UCLA – Devin Asiasi 24-yard pass from Wilton Speight (J.J. Molson Kick), 1:34. Bruins 17–7. Drive: 13 plays, 75 yards, 5:04.

Third quarter

- ARIZ – Josh Pollack 29-yard field goal, 10:16. Bruins 17–10. Drive: 9 plays, 71 yards, 3:09.
- ARIZ – Shawn Poindexter 11-yard pass from Rhett Rodriguez (Josh Pollack Kick), 8:54. Tie 17–17. Drive: 3 plays, 15 yards, 1:14.
- ARIZ – Josh Pollack 39-yard field goal, 4:58. Wildcats 20–17. Drive: 5 plays, 66 yards, 1:53.
- UCLA – Demetric Felton 25-yard pass from Wilton Speight (J.J. Molson Kick), 3:08. Bruins 24–20. Drive: 6 plays, 75 yards, 1:50.

Fourth quarter

- ARIZ – J.J. Taylor 1-yard run (Josh Pollack Kick), 12:34. Wildcats 27–24. Drive: 8 plays, 72 yards, 2:47.
- UCLA – Joshua Kelley 28-yard run (J.J. Molson Kick), 11:33. Bruins 31–27. Drive: 4 plays, 75 yards, 1:01.
- ARIZ – Josh Pollack 29-yard field goal, 6:28. Bruins 31–30. Drive: 11 plays, 63 yards, 5:05.

Passing

- ARIZ – Rhett Rodriguez – 15/34, 231 yards, 2 TD, 2 INT
- UCLA – Wilton Speight – 17/27, 204 yards, 2 TD

Rushing

- ARIZ – J. J. Taylor – 19 rushes, 154 yards, 1 TD
- UCLA – Joshua Kelley – 31 rushes, 136 yards, 1 TD

Receiving

- ARIZ – Shawn Poindexter – 6 receptions, 106 yards, 2 TD
- UCLA – Theo Howard – 3 receptions, 84 yards

=== Utah ===
No. 23 Utah Utes at UCLA Bruins

Quarter	1	2	3	4	Total
No. 23 Utes	3	14	21	3	41
Bruins	7	0	3	0	10

at Rose Bowl, Pasadena, California

- Date: October 26, 2018
- Game time: 7:40 p.m. PDT
- Game weather: Clear, 74 °F (23 °C)
- Game attendance: 41,848
- Referee: Steven Strimling
- TV announcers (ESPN): Jason Benetti, Kelly Stouffer, and Olivia Dekker
- No. 23 Utah rolls over UCLA 41-10 behind Moss' career night, Game Book

Game information

First quarter

- UTAH – Matt Gay 22-yard field goal, 9:48. Utes 3–0. Drive: 4 plays, 1 yard, 0:51.
- UCLA – Joshua Kelley 25-yard run (J.J. Molson Kick), 4:15. Bruins 7–3. Drive: 11 plays, 75 yards, 5:33.

Second quarter

- UTAH – Cole Fotheringham 7-yard pass from Britain Covey (Matt Gay Kick), 8:48. Utes 10–7. Drive: 13 plays, 78 yards, 6:16.
- UTAH – Zack Moss 1-yard run (Matt Gay Kick), 4:28. Utes 17–7. Drive: 7 plays, 36 yards, 2:49.

Third quarter

- UTAH – Zack Moss 1-yard run (Matt Gay Kick), 11:45. Utes 24–7. Drive: 9 plays, 75 yards, 3:15.
- UTAH – Armand Shyne 2-yard run (Matt Gay Kick), 9:44. Utes 31–7. Drive: 4 plays, 32 yards, 1:18.
- UCLA – J.J. Molson 27-yard field goal, 5:22. Utes 31–10. Drive: 9 plays, 65 yards, 4:22.
- UTAH – Zack Moss 5-yard run (Matt Gay Kick), 1:19. Utes 38–10. Drive: 9 plays, 75 yards, 4:03.

Fourth quarter

- UTAH – Matt Gay 49-yard field goal, 10:01. Utes 41–10. Drive: 7 plays, 17 yards, 4:59.

Passing

- UTAH – Tyler Huntley – 13/21, 138 yards, 1 INT
- UCLA – Wilton Speight – 20/40, 164 yards, 2 INT

Rushing

- UTAH – Zack Moss – 26 rushes, 211 yards, 3 TD
- UCLA – Joshua Kelley – 16 rushes, 90 yards, 1 TD

Receiving

- UTAH – Britain Covey – 5 receptions, 47 yards
- UCLA – Caleb Wilson – 5 receptions, 62 yards

=== At Oregon ===
UCLA Bruins at Oregon Ducks

Quarter	1	2	3	4	Total
Bruins	0	7	7	7	21
Ducks	14	7	7	14	42

at Autzen Stadium, Eugene, Oregon

- Date: November 3, 2018
- Game time: 4:40 p.m. PDT
- Game weather: Cloudy, 58 °F (14 °C)
- Game attendance: 56,114
- Referee: Chris Coyte
- TV announcers (FOX): Tim Brando, Spencer Tillman, and Holly Sonders
- Ducks down the Bruins 42-21 to become bowl eligible, Game Book

Game information

First quarter

- ORE – Ugo Amadi 56-yard punt return (Adam Stack Kick), 11:08. Ducks 7–0. Drive: 3 plays, -2 yards, 0:49.
- ORE – C. J. Verdell 1-yard run (Adam Stack Kick), 4:23. Ducks 14–0. Drive: 7 plays, 80 yards, 2:41.

Second quarter

- ORE – Dillon Mitchell 4-yard pass from Justin Herbert (Adam Stack Kick), 13:10. Ducks 21–0. Drive: 3 plays, 11 yards, 1:01.
- UCLA – Caleb Wilson 63-yard pass from Dorian Thompson (J.J. Molson Kick), 6:45. Ducks 21–7. Drive: 2 plays, 80 yards, 0:50.

Third quarter

- ORE – Cyrus Habibi-Likio 1-yard run (Adam Stack Kick), 6:15. Ducks 28–7. Drive: 3 plays, 18 yards, 1:22.
- UCLA – Joshua Kelley 25-yard run (J.J. Molson Kick), 2:21. Ducks 28–14. Drive: 9 plays, 75 yards, 3:54.

Fourth quarter

- ORE – Dillon Mitchell 67-yard pass from Justin Herbert (Adam Stack Kick), 10:20. Ducks 35–14. Drive: 2 plays, 69 yards, 0:41.
- UCLA – Theo Howard 11-yard pass from Wilton Speight (J.J. Molson Kick), 8:12. Ducks 35–21. Drive: 5 plays, 54 yards, 2:08.
- ORE – Tony Brooks-James 54-yard run (Adam Stack Kick), 5:56. Ducks 42–21. Drive: 5 plays, 75 yards, 2:16.

Passing

- UCLA – Wilton Speight – 13/25, 147 yards, 1 TD
- ORE – Justin Herbert – 18/32, 264 yards, 2 TD

Rushing

- UCLA – Joshua Kelley – 26 rushes, 161 yards, 1 TD
- ORE – C. J. Verdell – 25 rushes, 90 yards, 1 TD

Receiving

- UCLA – Caleb Wilson – 2 receptions, 75 yards, 1 TD
- ORE – Dillon Mitchell – 8 receptions, 156 yards, 2 TD

=== At Arizona State ===
UCLA Bruins at Arizona State Sun Devils

Quarter	1	2	3	4	Total
Bruins	7	7	7	7	28
Sun Devils	3	14	7	7	31

at Sun Devil Stadium, Tempe, Arizona

- Date: November 10, 2018
- Game time: 12:05 p.m. MST
- Game weather: Clear, 75 °F (24 °C)
- Game attendance: 46,466
- Referee: Kevin Mar
- TV announcers (P12N): J.B. Long, Anthony Herron, and Lewis Johnson
- Wilkins, Benjamin lead Sun Devils past Bruins, Game Book

Game information

First quarter

- ASU – Brandon Ruiz 34-yard field goal, 9:16. Sun Devils 3–0. Drive: 13 plays, 60 yards, 5:44.
- UCLA – Joshua Kelley 2-yard run (J.J. Molson Kick), 6:13. Bruins 7–3. Drive: 7 plays, 75 yards, 3:03.

Second quarter

- ASU – Manny Wilkins 13-yard run (Brandon Ruiz Kick), 10:09. Sun Devils 10–7. Drive: 7 plays, 85 yards, 2:54.
- UCLA – Darnay Holmes 31-yard interception return (J.J. Molson Kick), 4:36. Bruins 14–10. Drive: 2 plays, 1 yard, 0:36.
- ASU – Nick Ralston 5-yard pass from Manny Wilkins (Brandon Ruiz Kick), 0:58. Sun Devils 17–14. Drive: 10 plays, 75 yards, 3:38.

Third quarter

- ASU – Eno Benjamin 1-yard run (Brandon Ruiz Kick), 8:13. Sun Devils 24–14. Drive: 7 plays, 76 yards, 2:34.
- UCLA – Caleb Wilson 33-yard pass from Wilton Speight (J.J. Molson Kick), 6:13. Sun Devils 24–21. Drive: 6 plays, 75 yards, 2:00.

Fourth quarter

- ASU – Manny Wilkins 1-yard run (Brandon Ruiz Kick), 3:56. Sun Devils 31–21. Drive: 15 plays, 80 yards, 8:05.
- UCLA – Caleb Wilson 10-yard pass from Wilton Speight (J.J. Molson Kick), 1:57. Sun Devils 31–28. Drive: 9 plays, 75 yards, 1:59.

Passing

- UCLA – Wilton Speight – 26/35, 335 yards, 2 TD, 1 INT
- ASU – Manny Wilkins – 16/22, 199 yards, 1 TD, 1 INT

Rushing

- UCLA – Joshua Kelley – 21 rushes, 79 yards, 1 TD
- ASU – Eno Benjamin – 34 rushes, 182 yards, 1 TD

Receiving

- UCLA – Caleb Wilson – 11 receptions, 164 yards, 2 TD
- ASU – N'Keal Harry – 7 receptions, 100 yards

=== USC ===
85th Victory Bell: USC Trojans at UCLA Bruins

Quarter	1	2	3	4	Total
Trojans	10	14	3	0	27
Bruins	14	7	0	13	34

at Rose Bowl, Pasadena, California

- Date: November 17, 2018
- Game time: 12:40 p.m. PST
- Game weather: Partly cloudy, 69 °F (21 °C)
- Game attendance: 57,116
- Referee: Kevin Mar
- TV announcers (FOX): Joe Davis, Brady Quinn, and Bruce Feldman
- Kelley rushes for 289 yards, leads UCLA past USC 34-27, Game Book

Game information

First quarter

- USC – Michael Brown 46-yard field goal, 11:27. Trojans 3–0. Drive: 9 plays, 47 yards, 3:33.
- UCLA – Theo Howard 33-yard pass from Wilton Speight (J.J. Molson Kick), 7:53. Bruins 7–3. Drive: 8 plays, 75 yards, 3:34.
- UCLA – Wilton Speight 4-yard run (J.J. Molson Kick), 3:38. Bruins 14–3. Drive: 6 plays, 76 yards, 2:43.
- USC – Amon-Ra St. Brown 44-yard pass from JT Daniels (Michael Brown Kick), 0:22. Bruins 14–10. Drive: 6 plays, 75 yards, 3:16.

Second quarter

- USC – Devon Williams 5-yard return of blocked punt (Michael Brown Kick), 14:11. Trojans 17–14. Drive: 3 plays, -6 yards, 1:11.
- UCLA – Joshua Kelley 1-yard run (J.J. Molson Kick), 8:10. Bruins 21–17. Drive: 10 plays, 55 yards, 3:49.
- USC – Velus Jones Jr. 45-yard pass from J.T. Daniels (Michael Brown Kick), 5:54. Trojans 24–21. Drive: 5 plays, 75 yards, 2:16.

Third quarter

- USC – Michael Brown 22-yard field goal, 7:04. Trojans 27–21. Drive: 11 plays, 77 yards, 5:17.

Fourth quarter

- UCLA – Joshua Kelley 55-yard run (J.J. Molson Kick), 10:39. Bruins 28–27. Drive: 7 plays, 97 yards, 3:14.
- UCLA – J.J. Molson 19-yard field goal, 6:19. Bruins 31–27. Drive: 9 plays, 53 yards, 4:12.
- UCLA – J.J. Molson 48-yard field goal, 2:36. Bruins 34–27. Drive: 5 plays, 21 yards, 2:19.

Passing

- USC – JT Daniels – 20/34, 337 yards, 2 TD, 2 INT
- UCLA – Wilton Speight – 13/22, 166 yards, 1 TD, 1 INT

Rushing

- USC – Vavae Malepeai – 15 rushes, 77 yards
- UCLA – Joshua Kelley – 40 rushes, 289 yards, 2 TD

Receiving

- USC – Michael Pittman Jr. – 7 receptions, 106 yards
- UCLA – Theo Howard – 5 receptions, 76 yards, 1 TD

Joshua Kelley ran for 289 yards and 2 TDs, leading the Bruins to a 34-27 victory. His 289 yards comprised the third-highest single-game tally in UCLA history, and the most rushing yards by a Bruin in a game against their crosstown rival USC. After a back-and-forth game, Kelley scored a 55-yard touchdown with 10:39 remaining in the 4th quarter to give UCLA the lead, which they were able to maintain. With the win, UCLA were able to finally reclaim the rights to the coveted Victory Bell for the first time in four years.

=== Stanford ===
Stanford Cardinal at UCLA Bruins

Quarter	1	2	3	4	Total
Cardinal	10	17	14	8	49
Bruins	6	14	16	6	42

at Rose Bowl, Pasadena, California

- Date: November 24, 2018
- Game time: 12:10 p.m. PST
- Game weather: Partly cloudy, 65 °F (18 °C)
- Game attendance: 38,391
- Referee: Mike Mothershed
- TV announcers (P12N): Ted Robinson, Yogi Roth, and Jill Savage
- Costello throws 5 touchdowns to lead Stanford over UCLA, Game Book

Game information

First quarter

- UCLA – J. J. Molson 38-yard field goal, 13:32. Bruins 3–0. Drive: 4 plays, 2 yards, 0:42.
- STAN – J. J. Arcega-Whiteside 19-yard pass from K. J. Costello (Jet Toner Kick), 7:50. Cardinal 7–3. Drive: 5 plays, 62 yards, 2:12.
- STAN – Jet Toner 30-yard field goal, 3:20. Cardinal 10–3. Drive: 6 plays, 25 yards, 3:02.
- UCLA – J. J. Molson 35-yard field goal, 0:00. Cardinal 10–6. Drive: 8 plays, 57 yards, 3:20.

Second quarter

- STAN – Bryce Love 2-yard run (Jet Toner Kick), 11:11. Cardinal 17–6. Drive: 7 plays, 75 yards, 3:49.
- UCLA – Joshua Kelley 12-yard run (J. J. Molson Kick), 7:34. Cardinal 17–13. Drive: 9 plays, 75 yards, 3:37.
- STAN – Trenton Irwin 37-yard pass from K. J. Costello (Jet Toner Kick), 2:27. Cardinal 24–13. Drive: 3 plays, 37 yards, 0:16.
- UCLA – Joshua Kelley 1-yard run (J. J. Molson Kick), 0:37. Cardinal 24–20. Drive: 7 plays, 75 yards, 1:50.
- STAN – Jet Toner 20-yard field goal, 0:03. Cardinal 27–20. Drive: 3 plays, 24 yards, 0:22.

Third quarter

- UCLA – Martell Irby 12-yard run (J.J. Molson Kick), 12:19. Tie 27–27. Drive: 9 plays, 75 yards, 2:41.
- STAN – J. J. Arcega-Whiteside 23-yard pass from K. J. Costello (Jet Toner Kick), 7:02. Cardinal 34–27. Drive: 10 plays, 75 yards, 5:17.
- STAN – J. J. Arcega-Whiteside 2-yard pass from K. J. Costello (Jet Toner Kick), 5:24. Cardinal 41–27. Drive: 4 plays, 21 yards, 1:30.
- UCLA – Team safety, 2:21. Cardinal 41–29. Drive: 1 play, -3 yards, 0:06.
- UCLA – Darnay Holmes 93-yard kickoff return (J.J. Molson Kick), 2:09. Cardinal 41–36. Drive: 0 plays, 0 yards, 0:00.

Fourth quarter

- UCLA – Wilton Speight 1-yard run, 9:27. Bruins 42–41. Drive: 13 plays, 90 yards, 4:35.
- STAN – Osiris St. Brown 52-yard pass from K. J. Costello (Two-point conversion), 8:19. Cardinal 49–42. Drive: 3 plays, 75 yards, 1:08.

Passing

- STAN – K. J. Costello – 23/37, 344 yards, 5 TD, 1 INT
- UCLA – Wilton Speight – 29/47, 466 yards, 1 INT

Rushing

- STAN – Bryce Love – 22 rushes, 85 yards, 1 TD
- UCLA – Joshua Kelley – 18 rushes, 55 yards, 2 TD

Receiving

- STAN – J. J. Arcega-Whiteside – 7 receptions, 106 yards, 3 TD
- UCLA – Caleb Wilson – 9 receptions, 184 yards

The Bruins had possession of the ball twice in the final 3 1/2 minutes of the game, but failed to go ahead or even the score on both drives in a 49–42 defeat to Stanford. Cardinal quarterback K. J. Costello threw a career-high five touchdowns, including three to receiver J. J. Arcega-Whiteside. UCLA had scored 15 unanswered points to briefly take the lead in the fourth quarter but ultimately suffered their 11th straight loss to the Cardinal.

Speight threw for a career-high 466 yards in his final collegiate game, and despite the loss, the Bruins accumulated a season-high 528 yards of total offense. Tight end Caleb Wilson added 184 yards receiving. The Rose Bowl attendance of 38,391 was the Bruins' smallest home crowd since 1997. UCLA finished the season with a 3–9 record, their worst since going 2–7–1 in 1971.

== Honors ==
=== Pac-12 ===
Team	Player	Position	Year
First	Caleb Wilson	TE	JR
Second	Adarius Pickett	DB	SR
Honorable	Stefan Flintoft	P	SR
Honorable	Darnay Holmes	DB	SO
Honorable	Theo Howard	WR	JR
Honorable	Joshua Kelley	RB	JR
Honorable	J.J. Molson	PK	JR

== Players drafted into the NFL ==
Round	Pick	Player	Position	NFL Club
7	254	Caleb Wilson^{†}	TE	Arizona Cardinals
^{†} Mr. Irrelevant 2019

== Notes ==
- August 30, 2018 – Wilton Speight named starting quarterback for the Bruins for the season opener vs. Cincinnati.
- September 21, 2018 – Sophomore QB Devon Modster announces his intentions to transfer from UCLA.
- October 15, 2018 – Keisean Lucier-South named Pac-12 Conference Defensive Player of the Week.
- November 19, 2018 – Joshua Kelley named Pac-12 Conference Offensive Player of the Week.
