= 2018 USC Trojans football team =

American college football season

2018 USC Trojans football
- Conference: Pac-12 Conference
- South Division
- Record: 5–7 (4–5 Pac-12)
- Head coach: Clay Helton (3rd season)
- Offensive coordinator: Tee Martin (4th season)
- Offensive scheme: Multiple
- Defensive coordinator: Clancy Pendergast (4th season)
- Base defense: 5–2
- Captain: 4: Toa Lobendahn; Porter Gustin; Cameron Smith; Marvell Tell III
- Home stadium: Los Angeles Memorial Coliseum

2018 Pac-12 Conference football standings
	Conf.			Overall
Team	W		L	W		L
North Division
No. 13 Washington xy$	7	–	2	10	–	4
No. 10 Washington State x	7	–	2	11	–	2
Stanford	6	–	3	9	–	4
Oregon	5	–	4	9	–	4
California	4	–	5	7	–	6
Oregon State	1	–	8	2	–	10
South Division
Utah xy	6	–	3	9	–	5
Arizona State	5	–	4	7	–	6
USC	4	–	5	5	–	7
Arizona	4	–	5	5	–	7
UCLA	3	–	6	3	–	9
Colorado	2	–	7	5	–	7
Championship: Washington 10, Utah 3
$ – Conference champion; x – Division champion/co-champions; y – Championship game participant; Rankings from AP Poll

The 2018 USC Trojans football team represented the University of Southern California in the 2018 NCAA Division I FBS football season. They played their home games at the Los Angeles Memorial Coliseum and competed as members of the South Division of the Pac-12 Conference. They were led by third-year head coach Clay Helton.

Despite being ranked No. 15 in the AP Poll's preseason rankings, the Trojans finished the season 5–7, the program's first losing record since 2000 and missed a bowl game for the first time since that year (The 2010 and 2011 teams were banned from postseason play due to NCAA sanctions.) USC lost to both of its major rivals, UCLA and Notre Dame, in the same season for the first time since 2013, and it also lost to all other California Pac-12 schools (UCLA, California, and Stanford) in the same season for the first time since 1996. The team went 4–5 in Pac-12 play, tying Arizona for third place in the Pac-12 South Division.

On November 25, USC athletic director Lynn Swann announced that head coach Clay Helton would return in 2019 despite the disappointing season.

== Personnel ==
=== Coaching staff ===
Name	Position	Seasons at USC	Alma mater	Before USC
Clay Helton	Head coach	8	Houston (1994)	Memphis – Offensive coordinator (2009)
John Baxter	Special teams coordinator	7	Iowa State (1987)	Michigan – Special teams coordinator (2015)
Ronnie Bradford	Secondary coach	3	Colorado (1995)	LA Tech – Defensive backs coach / special teams coordinator (2015)
Keary Colbert	Tight ends coach / inside receivers coach	4	USC (2006)	Alabama – Offensive analyst (2015)
Tim Drevno	Tailbacks coach / offensive line coach / running game coordinator / pass protection coordinator	2	Cal State Fullerton (1992)	Michigan – Offensive coordinator / offensive line coach (2015)
Bryan Ellis	Quarterbacks coach	2	UAB (2011)	Western Kentucky – Wide receivers coach (2015)
Tee Martin	Offensive coordinator / wide receivers coach	7	Tennessee (2004)	Kentucky – Wide receivers coach (2011)
Johnny Nansen	Linebackers coach / recruiting coordinator / assistant head coach	5	Washington State (1997)	Washington – Special teams coordinator / Tailbacks coach (2013)
Clancy Pendergast	Defensive coordinator	5	Arizona (1990)	San Francisco 49ers – Linebackers coach (2015)
Kenechi Udeze	Defensive line coach	4	USC (2010)	Pittsburgh – Assistant strength and conditioning coach (2014)
Ivan Lewis	Head strength and conditioning coach	5	San Diego (2003)	Washington – Head strength & conditioning coach (2013)
Prentice Gill	Offensive graduate assistant – Wide receivers	4	Old Dominion (2012)	San Jose State – Graduate assistant (defensive backs) (2015)
Trevor Guyton	Defensive graduate assistant – Defensive line	1	California (2013)	Saskatchewan Roughriders – Defensive line (2014)
Michael Hutchings	Defensive graduate assistant – Linebackers	1	USC (2017)	USC – Inside linebacker (2016)
Dane Stevens	Offensive graduate assistant – Tight ends	2	USC (2016)	USC – Student assistant coach (2016)

=== Roster ===
2018 USC Trojans Football roster
Quarterback: 4 Trevor Scully – Freshman (5′11, 170); 10 Jack Sears – (redshirt) Freshman (6′3, 205); 13 Brandon Perdue – Freshman (6′4, 215); 16 Holden Thomas – (redshirt) Sophomore (6′6, 200); 18 JT Daniels – Freshman (6′3, 210); 19 Matt Fink – (redshirt) Sophomore (6′3, 200); Tailback: 7 Stephen Carr – Sophomore (6′0, 205); 28 Aca'Cedric Ware – Senior (6′0, 205); 29 Vavae Malepeai – (redshirt) Sophomore (6′0, 215); 30 Markese Stepp – Freshman (6′0, 230); 37 Ben Easington – (redshirt) Freshman (5′10, 205); 38 Chris Edmondson – (redshirt) Sophomore (5′9, 195); 39 Howard Felder Jr. – (redshirt) Freshman (6′0, 235); 40 Quincy Jountti – Junior (5′10, 205); Wide receiver: 1 Velus Jones Jr. – (redshirt) Sophomore (6′0, 190); 2 Devon Williams – Freshman (6′4, 205); 6 Michael Pittman Jr. – Junior (6′4, 215); 8 Amon-Ra St. Brown – Freshman (6′1, 195); 13 Trevon Sidney – (redshirt) Sophomore (5′11, 170); 17 Josh Imatorbhebhe – (redshirt) Sophomore (6′2, 215); 21 Tyler Vaughns – (redshirt) Sophomore (6′2, 185); 24 Jake Russell – (redshirt) Junior (5′11, 175); 26 Zach Wilson – Freshman (6′1, 200); 34 Matt Nyman – (redshirt) Freshman (6′2, 190); 36 Jack Webster – (redshirt) Freshman (6′0, 185); 44 Matthew Hocum – (redshirt) Junior (5′10, 180); 85 Keyshawn 'Pie' Young – (redshirt) Sophomore (5′11, 170); 87 Randal Grimes – Sophomore (6′4, 205); - John Jackson III – Freshman (6′1, 180); Tight end: 41 Chris Caulk – (redshirt) Sophomore (6′3, 210); 82 Tyler Petite – Senior (6′4, 250); 83 Josh Falo – Sophomore (6′6, 230); 84 Erik Krommenhoek – Sophomore (6′5, 255); 88 Daniel Imatorbhebhe – (redshirt) Junior (6′3, 240); 89 Austin Applebee – (redshirt) Senior (6′6, 250); Placekicker: 15 Thomas Fitts – (redshirt) Junior (6′1, 200); 38 Alex Stadthaus – Freshman (6′2, 195); 40 Chase McGrath – Sophomore (6′0, 195); 49 Michael Brown – (redshirt) Sophomore (6′1, 195)	Offensive Lineman: 50 Toa Lobendahn – C-OT – (redshirt) Senior (6′3, 295); 51 Bernard Schirmer – OT – (redshirt) Sophomore (6′6, 290); 52 Jacob Daniel – OG – (redshirt) Junior (6′4, 315); 54 Jalen McKenzie – OT – (redshirt) Freshman (6′5, 310); 56 Jordan Austin – OG – (redshirt) Senior (6′5, 290); 57 Justin Dedich – C – Freshman (6′2, 290); 62 Brett Neilon – C – (redshirt) Freshman (6′2, 295); 64 AJ Mageo – OT – Freshman (6′5, 320); 65 Frank Martin II – OG – (redshirt) Sophomore (6′4, 300); 67 Mark Zuvich – C – Freshman (6′3, 260); 68 Liam Douglass – OT – Freshman (6′5, 290); 70 Chuma Edoga – OT – Senior (6′4, 295); 72 Andrew Vorhees – OG-OT – Sophomore (6′6, 315); 73 Austin Jackson – OT – Sophomore (6′6, 305); 75 Alijah Vera-Tucker – OG-OT – (redshirt) Freshman (6′4, 310); 76 Clayton Bradley – OT – (redshirt) Junior (6′5, 295); 77 Chris Brown – OG – (redshirt) Senior (6′5, 310); Defensive line: 44 Malik Dorton – (redshirt) Senior (6′2, 280); 51 Marlon Tuipulotu – (redshirt) Freshman (6′3, 305); 78 Jay Tufele – (redshirt) Freshman (6′3, 310); 89 Christian Rector – (redshirt) Junior (6′4, 275); 90 Connor Murphy – Junior (6′7, 260); 91 Brandon Pili – Sophomore (6′4, 325); 93 Liam Jimmons – (redshirt) Sophomore (6′4, 290); 95 Trevor Trout – Freshman (6′4, 310); 96 Caleb Tremblay – Junior (6′5, 270); 97 Jacob Lichtenstein – (redshirt) Freshman (6′5, 270); Outside Linebacker: 26 Kana'i Mauga – Freshman (6′2, 240); 31 Hunter Echols – (redshirt) Freshman (6′5, 240); 34 Eli'Jah Winston – Freshman (6′3, 235); 41 Juliano Falaniko – Sophomore (6′4, 230); 42 Abdul-Malik McClain – Freshman (6′4, 240); 45 Porter Gustin – Senior (6′5, 260); 46 Grant Jones – (redshirt) Sophomore (6′2, 220) (+ILB); 48 Peter Esparza – Freshman (6′1, 205); 56 Jordan Iosefa – Junior (6′2, 230) (+ILB); 99 Oluwole Betiku Jr. – Junior (6′3, 240); Long snappers: 39 Jac Casasante – Freshman (6′0, 210); 59 Damon Johnson – Sophomore (6′0, 205); 61 Jake Olson – (redshirt) Junior (6′3, 225)	Inside Linebacker: 1 Palaie Gaoteote IV – Freshman (6′2, 250); 10 John Houston Jr. – (redshirt) Junior (6′3, 220); 13 Vi Jones – Sophomore (6′3, 220) (+OLB); 18 Raymond Scott – Freshman (6′2, 230); 35 Cameron Smith – Senior (6′2, 250); 47 Reuben Peters – (redshirt) Senior (6′0, 230) (+FB); 49 Matt Bayle – (redshirt) Junior (6′0, 215); 52 Spencer Gilbert – Freshman (6′0, 220); 53 Bryce Matthews – (redshirt) Freshman (6′3, 225); 54 Tayler Katoa – (redshirt) Freshman (6′2, 230); 58 Solomon Tuliaupupu – Freshman (6′3, 240); 59 Isaac Franco – (redshirt) Senior (6′1, 230); Cornerback: 4 Olaijah Griffin – Freshman (6′0, 180); 6 Isaac Taylor-Stuart – Freshman (6′2, 295); 8 Iman Marshall – Senior (6′1, 205); 9 Greg Johnson – (redshirt) Freshman (5′11, 190); 16 Dominic Davis – (redshirt) Junior (5′9, 190) (+TB); 17 Chase Williams – Freshman (6′2, 190); 23 Jonathan Lockett – (redshirt) Senior (5′11, 180); 24 Isaiah Langley – Senior (6′0, 175); 27 Ajene Harris – (redshirt) Senior (5′10, 185); Safety: 7 Marvell Tell – Senior (6′2, 195); 15 Talanoa Hufanga – Freshman (6′1, 215); 21 Isaiah Pola-Mao – (redshirt) Freshman (6′4, 200); 28 C.J. Pollard – (redshirt) Sophomore (6′1, 190); 30 Jordan McMillan – Freshman (5′11, 200); 31 Richard Hagestad – (redshirt) Sophomore (6′1, 195); 37 Davonte Nunnery – (redshirt) Senior (5′10, 210); Punter: 36 Chris Tilbey – (redshirt) Senior (6′5, 210); 46 Reid Budrovich – (redshirt) Senior (5′11, 185); 47 James Bermingham Jr. – (redshirt) Senior (6′4, 185); Holder: 81 Wyatt Schmidt – (redshirt) Senior (6′3, 205) (+SNP)
2018 USC Spring Football Roster (03/06/2018)

=== Returning starters ===
USC returns 31 starters in 2018, including 11 on offense, 13 on defense, and 5 on special teams.

Key departures include Sam Darnold (QB – 14 games), Ronald Jones II (TB – 13 games), Deontay Burnett (WR – 12 games), Steven Mitchell (WR – 7 games), Jalen Greene (WR – 5 games), Viane Talamaivao (OG – 5 games), Nico Falah (C – 14 games), Rasheem Green(DE/DT – 14 games), Josh Fatu (DT – 12 games), Uchenna Nwosu (OLB – 14 games), Jack Jones (CB – 13 games), Chris Hawkins (S – 14 games), Ykili Ross (S – 2 games).

Other departures include James Toland IV (TB), Matt Lopes (S).

==== Offense (11) ====
Player	Class	Position	Games started
Stephen Carr	Sophomore	Tailback	1 game
Tyler Vaughns	Sophomore (redshirt)	Wide receiver	10 games
Michael Pittman Jr.	Junior	Wide receiver	6 games
Tyler Petite	Senior	Tight end	11 games
Daniel Imatorbhebhe	Junior (redshirt)	Tight end	4 games
Erik Krommenhoek	Sophomore	Tight end	1 game
Toa Lobendahn	Senior (redshirt)	Offensive tackle	13 games
Chuma Edoga	Senior	Offensive tackle	12 games
Chris Brown	Senior (redshirt)	Offensive guard	14 games
Andrew Vorhees	Sophomore	Offensive guard	9 games
Clayton Bradley	Junior (redshirt)	Offensive tackle	3 games

==== Defense (13) ====
Player	Class	Position	Games started
Christian Rector	Junior (redshirt)	Defensive line	5 games
Malik Dorton	Senior (redshirt)	Defensive tackle	3 games
Brandon Pili	Sophomore	Defensive tackle	2 games
Marlon Tuipulotu	Freshman (redshirt)	Defensive tackle	1 game
Porter Gustin	Senior	Outside linebacker	2 games
Connor Murphy	Junior	Outside linebacker	1 game
Cameron Smith	Senior	Inside linebacker	13 games
John Houston Jr.	Junior (redshirt)	Inside linebacker	12 games
Jordan Iosefa	Junior	Linebacker	7 games
Iman Marshall	Senior	Cornerback	11 games
Ajene Harris	Senior (redshirt)	Cornerback	10 games
Isaiah Langley	Senior	Cornerback	4 games
Marvell Tell	Senior	Safety	14 games

==== Special teams (5) ====
Player	Class	Position	Games started
Reid Budrovich	Senior (redshirt)	Punter	14 games
Wyatt Schmidt	Senior (redshirt)	Holder	13 games
Chase McGrath	Sophomore	Kicker	13 games
Damon Johnson	Sophomore	Long snapper	12 games
Michael Brown	Sophomore (redshirt)	Kicker	2 games

=== Transfers ===
The Trojans lost 5 players due to transfer.

Name	Number	Pos.	Height	Weight	Year	Hometown	Transfer to
Jalen Greene	#10	WR	6'2	200	Senior (redshirt)	Inglewood, CA	Utah State
Jamel Cook	#21	S	6'4	190	Sophomore (redshirt)	Miami, FL	South Carolina
Olajuwon Tucker	#34	LB	6'2	220	Senior (redshirt)	Harbor City, CA	–
Roy Hemsley	#63	OG	6'5	315	Junior (redshirt)	Los Angeles, CA	Arizona State
Je'Quari Godfrey	#22	CB	6'2	185	Freshman (redshirt)	Oakland, CA	-

=== Depth chart ===
Defense

FS
Marvell Tell
Chase Williams
Davonte Nunnery

WLB	SLB
John Houston Jr.	Cameron Smith
Levi Jones	Palaie Gaoteote IV
Raymond Scott	Reuben Peters

SS
Talanoa Hufanga
C.J. Pollard
Richard Hagestad

CB
Iman Marshall
Ajene Harris
Isaiah Langley

OLB	DT	NT	DT	DE
Jordan Iosefa	Malik Dorton	Brandon Pili	Christian Rector	Porter Gustin
Kana'i Mauga	Jay Tufele	Marlon Tuipulotu	Caleb Tremblay	Hunter Echols
Juliano Falaniko	Jacob Lichtenstein	Liam Jimmons	Connor Murphy	Eli'jah Winston

CB
Greg Johnson
Olaijah Griffin
Jonathan Lockett

Offense

WR
Tyler Vaughns
Amon-Ra St. Brown
Randal Grimes

WR
Michael Pittman Jr.
Devon Williams
Josh Imatorbhebhe

LT	LG	C	RG	RT
Austin Jackson	Chris Brown	Toa Lobendahn	Andrew Vorhees	Chuma Edoga
Clayton Bradley	Jordan Austin	Brett Neilon	Alijah Vera-Tucker	Jalen McKenzie
Bernard Schirmer	Jacob Daniel	Justin Dedich	Frank Martin II	Liam Douglass

TE
Daniel Imatorbhebhe
Tyler Petite
Josh Falo

WR
Velus Jones Jr.
Trevon Sidney
Keyshawn 'Pie' Young

QB
JT Daniels
Matt Fink
Jack Sears

Key reserves
Offense
- Markese Stepp – TB
- Erik Krommenhoek – TE
Defense
- Trevor Trout – DT
- Oluwole Betiku Jr. – OLB
- Abdul-Malik McClain – OLB
- Solomon Tuliaupupu – ILB
- Isaac Taylor-Stuart – CB
- Dominic Davis – CB
Out
Out (Season)
- Isaiah Pola-Mao – S
- Chase McGrath – K
Out (Indefinitely)
- Tayler Katoa – ILB

RB
Aca'Cedric Ware
Stephen Carr
Vavae Malepeai

Special teams
PK Michael Brown (FG & PAT)
PK Alex Stadthaus (KO)
P Reid Budrovich
P Chris Tilbey
KR Velus Jones Jr. & Stephen Carr
PR Amon-Ra St. Brown
LS Damon Johnson
H Wyatt Schmidt

- Depth Chart 2018

True Freshman
Double Position : *

=== Recruiting class ===
College recruiting (2018)
Name	Hometown	School	Height	Weight	Commit date
Amon-Ra St. Brown #1 WR	Anaheim, California	Mater Dei High School	6 ft 0 in (1.83 m)	191 lb (87 kg)	February 7, 2018 (Signed) / January 6, 2018 (Committed)
Amon-Ra St. Brown #1 WR	Recruit ratings: Scout: 247Sports: ESPN:				
Palaie Gaoteote IV #1 ILB	Las Vegas, Nevada	Bishop Gorman High School	6 ft 2 in (1.88 m)	235 lb (107 kg)	December 20, 2017 (Signed) / February 19, 2017 (Committed)
Palaie Gaoteote IV #1 ILB	Recruit ratings: Scout: 247Sports: ESPN:				
JT Daniels #2 QB-Pro	Santa Ana, California	Mater Dei High School	6 ft 2 in (1.88 m)	205 lb (93 kg)	February 7, 2018 (Signed) / July 30, 2017 (Committed)
JT Daniels #2 QB-Pro	Recruit ratings: Scout: 247Sports: ESPN:				
Olaijah Griffin #3 CB	Mission Viejo, California	Mission Viejo High School	6 ft 0 in (1.83 m)	170 lb (77 kg)	February 7, 2018 (Signed) / February 7, 2018 (Committed)
Olaijah Griffin #3 CB	Recruit ratings: Scout: 247Sports: ESPN:				
Isaac Taylor-Stuart #4 CB	La Mesa, California	Helix High School	6 ft 2 in (1.88 m)	187 lb (85 kg)	February 7, 2018 (Signed) / February 7, 2018 (Committed)
Isaac Taylor-Stuart #4 CB	Recruit ratings: Scout: 247Sports: ESPN:				
Devon Williams #6 WR	Lancaster, California	Antelope Valley High School	6 ft 4 in (1.93 m)	200 lb (91 kg)	February 7, 2018 (Signed) / February 7, 2018 (Committed)
Devon Williams #6 WR	Recruit ratings: Scout: 247Sports: ESPN:				
Solomon Tuliaupupu #3 ILB	Santa Ana, California	Mater Dei High School	6 ft 2 in (1.88 m)	220 lb (100 kg)	February 7, 2018 (Signed) / February 7, 2018 (Committed)
Solomon Tuliaupupu #3 ILB	Recruit ratings: Scout: 247Sports: ESPN:				
Talanoa Hufanga #1 ATH S	Corvallis, Oregon	Crescent Valley High School	6 ft 1 in (1.85 m)	193 lb (88 kg)	December 20, 2017 (Signed) / December 29, 2017 (Committed)
Talanoa Hufanga #1 ATH S	Recruit ratings: Scout: 247Sports: ESPN:				
Justin Dedich #3 C	Temecula, California	Chaparral High School	6 ft 2 in (1.88 m)	290 lb (130 kg)	December 20, 2017 (Signed) / June 20, 2017 (Committed)
Justin Dedich #3 C	Recruit ratings: Scout: 247Sports: ESPN:				
Chase Williams #16 CB	Corona, California	Eleanor Roosevelt High School	6 ft 1 in (1.85 m)	190 lb (86 kg)	December 20, 2017 (Signed) / December 20, 2017 (Committed)
Chase Williams #16 CB	Recruit ratings: Scout: 247Sports: ESPN:				
Raymond Scott #8 OLB	Harbor City, California	Narbonne High School	6 ft 2 in (1.88 m)	220 lb (100 kg)	December 20, 2017 (Signed) / April 8, 2016 (Committed)
Raymond Scott #8 OLB	Recruit ratings: Scout: 247Sports: ESPN:				
Abdul-Malik McClain #14 WDE	San Juan Capistrano, California	J Serra Catholic High School	6 ft 4 in (1.93 m)	230 lb (100 kg)	December 20, 2017 (Signed) / December 20, 2017 (Committed)
Abdul-Malik McClain #14 WDE	Recruit ratings: Scout: 247Sports: ESPN:				
Trevor Trout #20 DT	Saint Louis, Missouri	Chaminade High School	6 ft 3 in (1.91 m)	315 lb (143 kg)	February 7, 2018 (Signed) / November 19, 2017 (Committed)
Trevor Trout #20 DT	Recruit ratings: Scout: 247Sports: ESPN:				
Markese Stepp #12 TB	Indianapolis, Indiana	Cathedral High School	6 ft 0 in (1.83 m)	228 lb (103 kg)	December 20, 2017 (Signed) / December 17, 2017 (Committed)
Markese Stepp #12 TB	Recruit ratings: Scout: 247Sports: ESPN:				
Kana'i Mauga #21 OLB	Waianae, Hawaii	Waianae High School	6 ft 2 in (1.88 m)	215 lb (98 kg)	December 20, 2017 (Signed) / June 24, 2017 (Committed)
Kana'i Mauga #21 OLB	Recruit ratings: Scout: 247Sports: ESPN:				
Caleb Tremblay #5 DT (JuCo)	Sacramento, California	American River College	6 ft 5 in (1.96 m)	275 lb (125 kg)	December 22, 2017 (Signed) / December 22, 2017 (Committed)
Caleb Tremblay #5 DT (JuCo)	Recruit ratings: Scout: 247Sports: ESPN:				
Eli'Jah Winston #21 ILB	Portland, Oregon	Central Catholic High School	6 ft 3 in (1.91 m)	233 lb (106 kg)	February 7, 2018 (Signed) / February 6, 2018 (Committed)
Eli'Jah Winston #21 ILB	Recruit ratings: Scout: 247Sports: ESPN:				
Liam Douglass #36 OT	Studio City, California	Harvard Westlake High School	6 ft 5 in (1.96 m)	273 lb (124 kg)	December 20, 2017 (Signed) / June 19, 2017 (Committed)
Liam Douglass #36 OT	Recruit ratings: Scout: 247Sports: ESPN:				
John Jackson III #95 WR	Gardena, California	Junipero Serra High School	6 ft 1 in (1.85 m)	180 lb (82 kg)	Walk-On / February 7, 2018 (Committed)
John Jackson III #95 WR	Recruit ratings: Scout: 247Sports: ESPN:				
Zach Wilson; WR	Scottsdale, Arizona	Saguaro High School	6 ft 0 in (1.83 m)	202 lb (92 kg)	Walk-On / February 7, 2018 (Committed)
Zach Wilson; WR	Recruit ratings: Scout: 247Sports: ESPN:				
Alex Stadthaus #24 K	Austin, Texas	Vandegrift High School	6 ft 1 in (1.85 m)	185 lb (84 kg)	Walk-On / January 29, 2018 (Committed)
Alex Stadthaus #24 K	Recruit ratings: Scout: 247Sports: ESPN:				
Jac Casasante #8 LS	Los Angeles, California	Loyola High School	6 ft 0 in (1.83 m)	190 lb (86 kg)	Walk-On / February 2, 2018 (Committed)
Jac Casasante #8 LS	Recruit ratings: Scout: 247Sports: ESPN:				
Bernard Schirmer; OT	Long Beach, California	Mt. San Antonio College	6 ft 5 in (1.96 m)	270 lb (120 kg)	Transfer / 2018
Bernard Schirmer; OT	Recruit ratings: Scout: 247Sports: ESPN:				
Jordan McMillan; S	Los Angeles, California	Loyola High School	5 ft 11 in (1.80 m)	190 lb (86 kg)	Walk-On / February 7, 2018 (Committed)
Jordan McMillan; S	Recruit ratings: Scout: 247Sports: ESPN:				
Spencer Gilbert; ILB	Bellflower, California	St. John Bosco High School	6 ft 0 in (1.83 m)	205 lb (93 kg)	Walk-On / February 9, 2018 (Committed)
Spencer Gilbert; ILB	Recruit ratings: Scout: 247Sports: ESPN:				
Howard Felder Jr. TB	Los Angeles, California	Cathedral High School	6 ft 0 in (1.83 m)	235 lb (107 kg)	Walk-On / 2017
Howard Felder Jr. TB	Recruit ratings: Scout: 247Sports: ESPN:				
Trevor Scully; QB	La Jolla, California	La Jolla High School	5 ft 11 in (1.80 m)	170 lb (77 kg)	Walk-On / 2018
Trevor Scully; QB	Recruit ratings: Scout: 247Sports: ESPN:				
AJ Mageo; OT	Mesa, Arizona	Red Mountain High School	6 ft 5 in (1.96 m)	320 lb (150 kg)	Walk-On / 2018
AJ Mageo; OT	Recruit ratings: Scout: 247Sports: ESPN:				
Mark Zuvich; C	Laguna Hills, California	Laguna Hills High School	6 ft 3 in (1.91 m)	260 lb (120 kg)	Walk-On / 2018
Mark Zuvich; C	Recruit ratings: Scout: 247Sports: ESPN:				
Quincy Jountti; TB	Bakersfield, California	Sacramento State Hornets football	5 ft 10 in (1.78 m)	205 lb (93 kg)	Walk-On / 2018 (Transfer)
Quincy Jountti; TB	Recruit ratings: Scout: 247Sports: ESPN:				
Matthew Hocum; WR	Milwaukee, Wisconsin	Marquette Golden Eagles	5 ft 10 in (1.78 m)	180 lb (82 kg)	Walk-On / 2017 (Transfer)
Matthew Hocum; WR	Recruit ratings: Scout: 247Sports: ESPN:				
Isaac Franco; ILB	Los Angeles, California	Adams State Grizzlies	6 ft 1 in (1.85 m)	230 lb (100 kg)	Walk-On / 2017 (Transfer)
Isaac Franco; ILB	Recruit ratings: Scout: 247Sports: ESPN:				
Overall recruit ranking: Scout: – 247Sports: #4 ESPN: –
Note: In many cases, Scout, Rivals, 247Sports, On3, and ESPN may conflict in their listings of height and weight.; In these cases, the average was taken. ESPN grades are on a 100-point scale.; Sources: "2018 Team Ranking". Rivals.com.

=== Scholarship distribution chart ===
Position	Freshman (28)	Sophomore (23)	Junior (11)	Senior (17)	2019 commit (13)	2020 commit (4)	2021 commit (2)
QB 3 (2)	JT Daniels; Jack Sears	Matt Fink	–	–	Kedon Slovis	Bryce Young	–
TB 4 (1)	Markese Stepp	Stephen Carr; Vavae Malepeai	–	Aca'Cedric Ware	Jordan Wilmore	–	–
FB 1	–	–	–	Reuben Peters*	–	–	–
WR 9 (3)	Amon-Ra St. Brown; Devon Williams	Randal Grimes; Josh Imatorbhebhe; Velus Jones Jr. Trevon Sidney; Tyler Vaughns; Keyshawn Pie Young	Michael Pittman Jr.	–	Drake London; Munir McClain; Puka Nacua	Koy Moore	–
TE 4 (2)	–	Josh Falo; Erik Krommenhoek	Daniel Imatorbhebhe	Tyler Petite	Ethan Rae; Jude Wolfe	–	–
OL 14 (0)	Justin Dedich; Liam Douglass; Jalen McKenzie; Brett Neilon; Alijah Vera-Tucker	Austin Jackson; Frank Martin II; Andrew Vorhees	Jacob Daniel; Clayton Bradley	Jordan Austin; Chris Brown; Chuma Edoga; Toa Lobendahn	Jason Rodriguez	–	–
DL 10 (1)	Jacob Lichtenstein; Trevor Trout; Jay Tufele; Marlon Tuipulotu	Liam Jimmons; Brandon Pili	Connor Murphy; Christian Rector; Caleb Tremblay	Malik Dorton	–	–	Jay Toia
OLB 8 (2)	Hunter Echols; Kana'i Mauga; Abdul-Malik McClain; Raymond Scott; Eli'Jah Winston	Juliano Falaniko	Oluwole Betiku Jr.	Porter Gustin	Gino Quinones	–	Ma'a Gaoteote
ILB 7 (2)	Palaie Gaoteote IV; Tayler Katoa; Solomon Tuliaupupu	Levi Jones	John Houston Jr. Jordan Iosefa	Cameron Smith	Maninoa Tufono; Stanley Taufoou	–	–
CB 9 (2)	Olaijah Griffin; Greg Johnson; Isaac Taylor-Stuart; Chase Williams	–	Dominic Davis	Ajene Harris; Isaiah Langley; Jonathan Lockett; Iman Marshall	Chris Steele; Trey Davis	–	–
S 5 (0)	Talanoa Hufanga; Isaiah Pola-Mao	Bubba Bolden; C.J. Pollard	–	Marvell Tell	–	–	–
SP 5 (1)	–	Michael Brown; Damon Johnson; Chase McGrath*	–	Reid Budrovich*; Chris Tilbey	–	Parker Lewis	–
ATH (–)	x	x	x	x	–	–	–

redshirt year used / redshirt year eligible / * Former walk-on

– 85 scholarships permitted, 81 currently allotted to players

– 78 recruited players on scholarship (Three former walk-ons)

– OT Jalen McKenzie took an advanced scholarship or "blueshirt" limiting USC's class of 2018 to 24.

Projecting Scholarship Distribution 2018

== 2018 NFL draft ==
=== NFL Combine ===
The official list of participants for the 2018 NFL Combine included USC football players WR Deontay Burnett, QB Sam Darnold, DE Rasheem Green, RB Ronald Jones II, WR Steven Mitchell Jr. & OLB Uchenna Nwosu.

=== Team players drafted into the NFL ===
Player	Position	Round	Pick	NFL Team
Sam Darnold (Sophomore)	Quarterback	1	3	New York Jets
Ronald Jones II (Junior)	Tailback	2	38 (6)	Tampa Bay Buccaneers
Uchenna Nwosu	Linebacker	2	48 (I6)	Los Angeles Chargers
Rasheem Green (Junior)	Defensive end	3	79 (I5)	Seattle Seahawks
Steven Mitchell Jr.	Wide receiver	UDFA	–	Los Angeles Rams
Deontay Burnett (Junior)	Wide receiver	UDFA	–	Tennessee Titans
Viane Talamaivao	Offensive guard	UDFA	–	Seattle Seahawks
Nico Falah	Center	UDFA	–	Tennessee Titans
Josh Fatu	Defensive tackle	UDFA	–	Detroit Lions
Chris Hawkins	Safety	UDFA	–	Seattle Seahawks

== Schedule ==
Date	Time	Opponent	Rank	Site	TV	Result	Attendance
September 1	1:00 p.m.	UNLV*	No. 15	Los Angeles Memorial Coliseum; Los Angeles, CA	P12N	W 43–21	58,708
September 8	5:30 p.m.	at No. 10 Stanford	No. 17	Stanford Stadium; Stanford, CA (rivalry)	FOX	L 3–17	42,856
September 15	5:00 p.m.	at Texas*	No. 22	Darrell K Royal–Texas Memorial Stadium; Austin, TX	FOX	L 14–37	103,507
September 21	7:30 p.m.	Washington State		Los Angeles Memorial Coliseum; Los Angeles, CA	ESPN	W 39–36	52,421
September 29	7:30 p.m.	at Arizona		Arizona Stadium; Tucson, AZ	ESPN2	W 24–20	43,573
October 13	7:30 p.m.	No. 19 Colorado		Los Angeles Memorial Coliseum; Los Angeles, CA	FS1	W 31–20	57,615
October 20	5:00 p.m.	at Utah		Rice-Eccles Stadium; Salt Lake City, UT	P12N	L 28–41	46,405
October 27	12:30 p.m.	Arizona State		Los Angeles Memorial Coliseum; Los Angeles, CA	ABC/ESPN2	L 35–38	47,406
November 3	7:00 p.m.	at Oregon State		Reser Stadium; Corvallis, OR	FS1	W 38–21	35,187
November 10	7:30 p.m.	California^{†}		Los Angeles Memorial Coliseum; Los Angeles, CA	ESPN	L 14–15	56,721
November 17	12:30 p.m.	at UCLA		Rose Bowl; Pasadena, CA (Victory Bell)	FOX	L 27–34	57,116
November 24	5:00 p.m.	No. 3 Notre Dame*		Los Angeles Memorial Coliseum; Los Angeles, CA (Jeweled Shillelagh)	ABC	L 17–24	59,821
*Non-conference game; ^{†}Homecoming; Rankings from AP Poll released prior to the game; All times are in Pacific time

== Game summaries ==
=== UNLV ===
UNLV Rebels at USC Trojans

Quarter	1	2	3	4	Total
Rebels	7	7	0	7	21
No. 15 Trojans	6	13	0	24	43

at Los Angeles Memorial Coliseum, Los Angeles, California

- Date: September 1, 2018
- Game time: 1:00 p.m.
- Game weather: Temperature: 80 °F (27 °C) • Weather: Clear Skies • Wind: Calm
- Game attendance: 58,708
- Referee: Kevin Mar
- TV announcers (P12N): Ted Robinson, Yogi Roth and Jill Savage (sideline)

Game information

First quarter

- USC (14:07) – #40 Chase McGrath 46 yard Field Goal – USC 3–0
- USC (3:18) – #40 Chase McGrath 38 yard Field Goal – USC 6–0
- UNLV (2:37) – #3 Lexington Thomas 71 yard run TD
  (#30 Evan Pantels kick) – UNLV 7–6

Second quarter

- USC (13:12) – #40 Chase McGrath 29 yard Field Goal – USC 9–7
- UNLV (10:32) – #1 Armani Rogers to #84 Kendal Keys 29 yard pass TD
  (#30 Evan Pantels kick) – UNLV 14–9
- USC (9:19) – #40 Chase McGrath 47 yard Field Goal – UNLV 14–12
- USC (1:04) – #29 Vavae Malepeai 2 yard run TD
  (#40 Chase McGrath kick) – USC 19–14

Fourth quarter

- USC (14:52) – #18 JT Daniels to #8 Amon-Ra St. Brown 43 yard pass TD
  (#40 Chase McGrath kick) – USC 26–14
- USC (12:39) – #28 Aca'Cedric Ware 15 yard run TD
  (#40 Chase McGrath kick) – USC 33–14
- UNLV (8:06) – #1 Armani Rogers to #45 Giovanni Fauolo 5 yard pass TD
  (#30 Evan Pantels kick) – USC 33–21
- USC (4:39) – #40 Chase McGrath 36 yard Field Goal – USC 36–21
- USC (1:38) – #29 Vavae Malepeai 20 yard run TD
  (#40 Chase McGrath kick) – USC 43–21

Passing

- UNLV – #1 Armani Rogers – 12/27 97 Yds – 2 TD
- USC – #18 JT Daniels – 22/35 282 Yds – 1 TD

Rushing

- UNLV – #3 Lexington Thomas – 14 Runs 136 Yds – 1 TD
- USC – #28 Aca'Cedric Ware – 10 Runs 100 Yds – 1 TD

Receiving

- UNLV – #84 Kendal Keys – 1 Rec 31 Yds – 1 TD
- USC – #8 Amon-Ra St. Brown – 7 Rec 98 Yds – 1TD

=== Stanford ===
USC Trojans at Stanford Cardinal

Quarter	1	2	3	4	Total
No. 17 Trojans	0	0	3	0	3
No. 10 Cardinal	7	7	3	0	17

at Stanford Stadium, Stanford, California

- Date: September 8, 2018
- Game time: 5:30 p.m.
- Game attendance: 42,856
- TV: FOX

Game information

First quarter

- STAN (10:26) – #20 Bryce Love 6 yard run TD
  (#26 Jet Toner kick) – STAN 7–0

Second quarter

- STAN (0:34) – #3 K.J. Costello to #84 Colby Parkinson 9 yard pass TD
  (#26 Jet Toner kick) – STAN 14–0

Third quarter

- USC (11:24) – #40 Chase McGrath 35 yard Field Goal – STAN 14–3
- STAN (6:04) – #26 Jet Toner 30 yard Field Goal – STAN 17–3

Passing

- USC – #18 JT Daniels – 16/34 215 Yds – 2 Int
- STAN – #3 K. J. Costello – 16/27 183 Yds – 1 TD

Rushing

- USC – #28 Aca'Cedric Ware – 18 Runs 59 Yds
- STAN – #20 Bryce Love – 22 Runs 136 Yds – 1 TD

Receiving

- USC – #21 Tyler Vaughns – 7 Rec 84 Yds
- STAN – #82 Kaden Smith – 4 Rec 77 Yds

=== Texas ===
No. 22 USC Trojans at Texas Longhorns

Quarter	1	2	3	4	Total
No. 22 Trojans	14	0	0	0	14
Longhorns	3	13	21	0	37

at Darrell K Royal–Texas Memorial Stadium, Austin, Texas

- Date: September 15, 2018
- Game time: 5:00 p.m.
- Game attendance: 103,507

Game information

First quarter

- USC (10:48) – #7 Stephen Carr 23 yard run TD
  (#40 Chase McGrath kick) – USC 7–0
- TEX (6:19) – #17 Cameron Dicker 20 yard Field Goal – TEX 7–3
- USC (0:33) – #29 Vavae Malepeai 3 yard run TD
  (#40 Chase McGrath kick) – USC 14–0

Second quarter

- TEX (13:23) – #11 Sam Ehlinger to #84 Lil'Jordan Humphrey 47 yard pass TD
  (#17 Cameron Dicker kick) – USC 14–10
- TEX (10:39) – #17 Cameron Dicker 46 yard Field Goal – TEX 14–13
- TEX (0:00) – #17 Cameron Dicker 46 yard Field Goal – TEX 14–16

Third quarter

- TEX (10:45) – #11 Sam Ehlinger to #14 Joshua Moore 27 yard pass TD
  (#17 Cameron Dicker kick) – TEX 23–14
- TEX (6:25) – #45 Anthony Wheeler blocked FG return
  (#17 Cameron Dicker kick) – TEX 30–14
- TEX (1:42) – #11 Sam Ehlinger 4 yard run TD
  (#17 Cameron Dicker kick) – TEX 37–14

Passing

- USC – #18 JT Daniels – 30/46 322 Yds – 1 Int
- TEX – #11 Sam Ehlinger – 15/33 223 Yds – 2 TD

Rushing

- USC – #7 Stephen Carr – 6 Runs 13 Yds – 1 TD
- TEX – #5 Tre Watson – 18 Runs 72 Yds

Receiving

- USC – #8 Amon-Ra St. Brown – 9 Rec 167 Yds
- TEX – #84 Lil'Jordan Humphrey– 4 Rec 84 Yds – 1 TD

=== Washington State ===
Washington State Cougars at USC Trojans

Quarter	1	2	3	4	Total
Cougars	3	21	6	6	36
Trojans	7	10	7	15	39

at Los Angeles Memorial Coliseum, Los Angeles, California

- Date: September 21, 2018
- Game time: 7:30 p.m.
- Game weather: 70 °F (21 °C); clear skies
- Game attendance: 52,421
- Referee: Javarro Edwards
- TV announcers (ESPN): Dave Pasch, Greg McElroy, Tom Luginbill

Game information

First quarter

- USC (12:56) – #29 Vavae Malepeai 3 yard run TD
  (#49 Michael Brown kick) – USC 7–0
- WSU (7:19) – #40 Blake Mazza 50 yard Field Goal – USC 7–3

Second quarter

- WSU (13:29) – #32 James Williams 4 yard run TD
  (#40 Blake Mazza kick) – WSU 10–7
- USC (12:23) – #18T Daniels to #21 Tyler Vaughns 9 yard pass TD
  (#49 Michael Brown kick) – USC 14–10
- WSU (9:55) – #16 Gardner Minshew to #8 Easop Winston
  28 yard pass TD (#40 Blake Mazza kick) – WSU 17–14
- WSU (1:39) – #16 Gardner Minshew to #12 Dezmon Patmon 7 yard pass TD
  (#40 Blake Mazza kick) – WSU 24–14
- USC (0:00) – #49 Michael Brown 26 yard Field Goal – WSU 24–17

Third quarter

- WSU (10:21) – #21 Max Borghi 13 yard run TD – WSU 30–17
- USC (9:03) – #18 JT Daniels to #6 Michael Pittman Jr. 50 yard pass TD
  (#49 Michael Brown kick) – WSU 30–24

Fourth quarter

- USC (14:31) – #18 JT Daniels to #8 Amon-Ra St. Brown 30 yard pass TD
  (#49 Michael Brown kick) – USC 31–30
- WSU (10:15) – #16 Gardner Minshew to #4 Easop Winston Jr.
  4 yard pass TD – WSU 36–31
- USC (8:03) – #29 Vavae Malepeai 2 yard run TD
  (2 pts Conversion) – USC 39–36

Passing

- WSU – #16 Gardner Minshew – 37/52 344 Yds – 3 TD
- USC – #18 JT Daniels – 17/26 241 Yds – 3 TD

Rushing

- WSU – #32 James Williams – 17 Runs 54 Yds – 1 TD
- USC – #29 Vavae Malepeai – 13 Runs 78 Yds – 2 TD

Receiving

- WSU – #4 Easop Winston – 6 Rec 143 Yds – 2 TD
- USC – #21 Tyler Vaughns – 7 Rec 64 Yds – 1 TD

=== Arizona ===
USC Trojans at Arizona Wildcats

Quarter	1	2	3	4	Total
Trojans	7	10	7	0	24
Wildcats	0	0	7	13	20

at Arizona Stadium, Tucson, Arizona

- Date: September 29, 2018
- Game time: 7:30 p.m.
- Game weather: Clear, 90 °F (32 °C)
- Game attendance: 43,573
- Referee: Steve Strimling
- TV announcers (ESPN2): Adam Amin (play-by-play), Rod Gilmore (analyst), Quint Kessenich (sideline reporter)

Game information

First quarter

- USC (5:52) – #29 Vavae Malepeai 1 yard run TD
  (#49 Michael Brown kick) – USC 7–0

Second quarter

- USC (11:12) – #49 Michael Brown 42 yard Field Goal – USC 10–0
- USC (5:08) – #28 Aca'Cedric Ware 26 yard run TD
  (#49 Michael Brown kick) – USC 17–0

Third quarter

- USC (10:36) – #28 Aca'Cedric Ware 69 yard run TD
  (#49 Michael Brown kick) – USC 24–0
- AZ (7:44) – #14 Khalil Tate to #86 Stanley Berryhill III 33 yard pass TD
  (#43 Lucas Havrisik kick) – USC 24–7

Fourth quarter

- AZ (9:34) – #14 Khalil Tate to #18 Cedric Peterson 32 yard pass TD
  (#43 Lucas Havrisik kick) – USC 24–14
- AZ (1:40) – #23 Gary Brightwell 1 yard run TD – USC 24–20

Passing

- USC – #18 JT Daniels – 16/24 197 Yds
- AZ – #14 Khalil Tate – 16/33 232 Yds – 2 TD – 1 Int

Rushing

- USC – #28 Aca'Cedric Ware – 21 Runs 173 Yds – 2 TD
- AZ – #23 Gary Brightwell – 4 Runs 14 Yds – 1 TD

Receiving

- USC – #83 Josh Falo – 3 Rec 54 Yds
- AZ – #18 Cedric Peterson – 2 Rec 38 Yds – 1 TD

=== Colorado ===
No. 19 Colorado Buffaloes at USC Trojans

Quarter	1	2	3	4	Total
No. 19 Buffaloes	0	7	0	13	20
Trojans	0	21	7	3	31

at Los Angeles Memorial Coliseum, Los Angeles, California

- Date: October 13, 2018
- Game time: 7:30 p.m.
- Game attendance: 57,615
- TV announcers (FS1): Joe Davis, Brady Quinn and Bruce Feldman

Game information

Second quarter

- COLO (11:58) – #2 Laviska Shenault 49 yard run TD
  (#48 James Stefanou kick) – COLO 7–0
- USC (10:11) – #18 JT Daniels to #21 Tyler Vaughns 27 yard pass TD
  (#49 Michael Brown kick) – USC 7–7
- USC (3:33) – #18 JT Daniels to #6 Michael Pittman Jr. 65 yard pass TD
  (#49 Michael Brown kick) – USC 14–7
- USC (1:10) – #18 JT Daniels to #6 Michael Pittman Jr. 9 yard pass TD
  (#49 Michael Brown kick) – USC 21–7

Third quarter

- USC (5:16) – #27 Ajene Harris 6 yard interception return
  (#49 Michael Brown kick) – USC 28–7

Fourth quarter

- COLO (6:46) – #21 Kyle Evans 2 yard run TD
  (#48 James Stefanou kick) – USC 28–14
- USC (5:05) – #49 Michael Brown 38 yard Field Goal – USC 31–14
- COLO (3:23) – #12 Steven Montez 19 yard run TD – USC 31–20

Passing

- COLO – #12 Steven Montez – 26/47 170 Yds – 1 Int
- USC – #18 JT Daniels – 17/34 272 Yds – 3 TD – 2 Int

Rushing

- COLO – #34 Travon McMillian – 18 Runs 32 Yds
- USC – #28 Aca'Cedric Ware – 6 Runs 23 Yds

Receiving

- COLO – #2 Laviska Shenault – 9 Rec 72 Yds
- USC – #6 Michael Pittman Jr. – 5 Rec 144 Yds – 2 TD

=== Utah ===
USC Trojans at Utah Utes

Quarter	1	2	3	4	Total
Trojans	14	0	0	14	28
Utes	7	13	14	7	41

at Rice-Eccles Stadium, Salt Lake City, Utah

- Date: October 20, 2018
- Game time: 5:00 p.m.
- Game attendance: 46,405

Game information

First quarter

- USC (7:31) – #18 JT Daniels to #6 Michael Pittman Jr. 34 yard pass TD
  (#49 Michael Brown kick) – USC 7–0
- USC (5:58) – #78 Jay Tufele 48 yard fumble return
  (#49 Michael Brown kick) – USC 14–0
- UTAH (5:05) – #1 Tyler Huntley to #18 Britain Covey 46 yard pass TD
  (#97 Matt Gay kick) – USC 14–7

Second quarter

- UTAH (14:11) – #97 Matt Gay 33 yard Field Goal – USC 14–10
- UTAH (7:27) – #1 Tyler Huntley 3 yard run TD
  (#97 Matt Gay kick) – UTAH 17–14
- UTAH (0:00) – #97 Matt Gay 30 yard Field Goal – UTAH 20–14

Third quarter

- UTAH (12:30) – #1 Tyler Huntley to #21 Solomon Enis 27 yard pass TD
  (#97 Matt Gay kick) – UTAH 27–14
- UTAH (3:28) – #1 Tyler Huntley to #17 Demari Simpkins 11 yard pass TD
  (#97 Matt Gay kick) – UTAH 34–14

Fourth quarter

- USC (11:34) – #19 Matt Fink to #82 Tyler Petite 3 yard pass TD
  (#49 Michael Brown kick) – UTAH 34–21
- UTAH (8:55) – #1 Tyler Huntley to #44 Jake Jackson 11 yard pass TD
  (#97 Matt Gay kick) – UTAH 41–21
- USC (3:05) – #29 Vavae Malepeai 12 yard run TD
  (#49 Michael Brown kick) – UTAH 41–28

Passing

- USC – #18 JT Daniels – 6/16 89 Yds – 1 TD – 2 Int
- UTAH – #1 Tyler Huntley – 22/29 341 Yds – 4 TD

Rushing

- USC – #29 Vavae Malepeai – 10 Runs 44 Yds – 1 TD
- UTAH – #2 Zack Moss – 25 Runs 136 Yds

Receiving

- USC – #6 Michael Pittman Jr. – 4 Rec 107 Yds – 1 TD
- UTAH – #18 Britain Covey – 4 Rec 79 Yds – 1 TD

=== Arizona State ===
Arizona State Sun Devils at USC Trojans

Quarter	1	2	3	4	Total
Sun Devils	14	10	7	7	38
Trojans	7	7	14	7	35

at Los Angeles Memorial Coliseum, Los Angeles, California

- Date: October 27, 2018
- Game time: 12:30 p.m.
- Game weather: Sunny with clear skies, 82 °F (28 °C)
- Game attendance: 47,406
- Referee: Chris Coyte
- TV announcers (ABC/ESPN2): Adam Amin (play-by-play), Rod Gilmore (analyst), Quint Kessenich (sideline reporter)

Game information

First quarter

- USC (12:52) – #21 Tyler Vaughns 82 yard punt return
  (#49 Michael Brown kick) – USC 7–0
- ASU (8:55) – #5 Manny Wilkins to #1 N'Keal Harry 44 yard pass TD
  (#1 Brandon Ruiz kick) – USC 7–7
- ASU (6:22) – #3 Eno Benjamin 3 yard run TD
  (#1 Brandon Ruiz kick) – ASU 14–7

Second quarter

- ASU (14:12) – #1 Brandon Ruiz 31 yard Field Goal – ASU 17–7
- ASU (6:12) – #3 Eno Benjamin 49 yard run TD
  (#1 Brandon Ruiz kick) – ASU 24–7
- USC (0:13) – #10 Jack Sears to #6 Michael Pittman Jr. 6 yard pass TD
  (#49 Michael Brown kick) – ASU 24–14

Third quarter

- USC (10:49) – #1 Velus Jones Jr. 1 yard run TD
  (#49 Michael Brown kick) – ASU 24–21
- USC (10:24) – #21 Tyler Vaughns to #6 Michael Pittman Jr. 36 yard pass TD
  (#49 Michael Brown kick) – USC 28–24
- ASU (2:54) – #1 N'Keal Harry 92 yard punt return
  (#1 Brandon Ruiz kick) – ASU 31–28

Fourth quarter

- ASU (1:23) – #5 Manny Wilkins 45 yard run TD
  (#1 Brandon Ruiz kick) – ASU 38–28
- USC (0:35) – #10 Jack Sears to #21 Tyler Vaughns 48 yard pass TD
  (#49 Michael Brown kick) – ASU 38–35

Passing

- ASU – #5 Manny Wilkins – 14/22 166 Yds – 1 TD
- USC – #10 Jack Sears – 20/28 235 Yds – 2 TD

Rushing

- ASU – #3 Eno Benjamin – 29 Runs 185 Yds – 2 TD
- USC – #29 Vavae Malepeai – 5 Runs 51 Yds

Receiving

- ASU – #1 N'Keal Harry – 4 Rec 95 Yds – 1 TD
- USC – #6 Michael Pittman Jr. – 6 Rec 90 Yds – 2 TD

=== Oregon State ===
USC Trojans at Oregon State Beavers

Quarter	1	2	3	4	Total
Trojans	7	14	7	10	38
Beavers	0	14	7	0	21

at Reser Stadium, Corvallis, Oregon

- Date: November 3, 2018
- Game time: 7:00 p.m.
- Game attendance: 35,187
- TV: FS1

Game information

First quarter

- USC (5:38) – #7 Stephen Carr 8 yard run TD
  (#49 Michael Brown kick) – USC 7–0

Second quarter

- USC (14:50) – #28 Aca'Cedric Ware 57 yard run TD
  (#49 Michael Brown kick) – USC 14–0
- USC (7:13) – #18 JT Daniels to #2 Devon Williams 41 yard pass TD
  (#49 Michael Brown kick) – USC 21–0
- OSU (4:15) – #12 Jack Colletto 6 yard run TD
  (#46 Jordan Choukair kick) – USC 21–7
- OSU (0:04) – #6 Jake Luton to #81 Noah Togiai 11 yard pass TD
  (#46 Jordan Choukair kick) – USC 21–14

Third quarter

- USC (10:42) – #28 Aca'Cedric Ware 2 yard run TD
  (#49 Michael Brown kick) – USC 28–14
- OSU (6:23) – #21 Artavis Pierce 6 yard run TD
  (#46 Jordan Choukair kick) – USC 28–21

Fourth quarter

- USC (11:53) – #28 Aca'Cedric Ware 62 yard run TD
  (#49 Michael Brown kick) – USC 35–21
- USC (4:42) – #49 Michael Brown 46 yard Field Goal – USC 38–21

Passing

- USC – #18 JT Daniels – 14/26 177 Yds – 1 TD
- OSU – #6 Jake Luton – 31/45 301 Yds – 1 TD

Rushing

- USC – #28 Aca'Cedric Ware – 17 Runs 205 Yds – 3 TD
- OSU – #22 Jermar Jefferson – 18 Runs 58 Yds

Receiving

- USC – #2 Devon Williams – 3 Rec 77 Yds – 1TD
- OSU – #17 Isaiah Hodgins – 8 Rec 129 Yds

=== California ===
California Golden Bears at USC Trojans

Quarter	1	2	3	4	Total
Golden Bears	0	0	15	0	15
Trojans	0	14	0	0	14

at Los Angeles Memorial Coliseum, Los Angeles, California

- Date: November 10, 2018
- Game time: 7:36 p.m. PST
- Game weather: Partly cloudy, 61 °F (16 °C)
- Game attendance: 56,721
- Referee: Mike McCabe
- TV announcers (ESPN): Adam Amin, Rod Gilmore, and Quint Kessenich
- Defensive Cal snaps 14-game skid vs USC with 15-14 victory, Game Book

Game information

Second quarter

- USC (14:13) – #18 JT Daniels to #21 Tyler Vaughns 2 yard pass TD
  (#49 Michael Brown kick) – USC 7–0
- USC (7:29) – #18 JT Daniels to #21 Tyler Vaughns 23 yard pass TD
  (#49 Michael Brown kick) – USC 14–0

Third quarter

- CAL (14:03) – California Defense Safety – USC 14–2
- CAL (12:51) – #7 Chase Garbers to #17 Vic Wharton III 29 yard pass TD
  (#39 Greg Thomas kick) – USC 14–9
- CAL (6:13) – #7 Chase Garbers 5 yard run TD TD – CAL 15–14

Fourth quarter

Passing

- CAL – #7 Chase Garbers – 14/26 93 Yds– 1 TD
- USC – #18 JT Daniels – 21/34 180 Yds – 2 TDs – 1 INT

Rushing

- CAL – #28 Patrick Laird – 19 runs 71 Yds
- USC – #28 Aca'Cedric Ware – 16 runs 103 Yds

Receiving

- CAL – #17 Vic Wharton III – 2 Rec 34 Yds – 1 TD
- USC – #21 Tyler Vaughns – 8 Rec 91 Yds – 2 TDs

=== UCLA ===
USC Trojans at UCLA Bruins

Quarter	1	2	3	4	Total
Trojans	10	14	3	0	27
Bruins	14	7	0	13	34

at Rose Bowl, Pasadena, California

- Date: November 17, 2018
- Game time: 12:30 p.m. PT
- Game weather: Partly cloudy, 69 °F (21 °C)
- Game attendance: 57,116
- Referee: Kevin Mar
- TV announcers (FOX): Joe Davis, Brady Quinn, and Bruce Feldman
- Kelley rushes for 289 yards, leads UCLA past USC 34-27,

Game information

First quarter

- USC – Michael Brown 46-yard field goal, 11:27. Trojans 3–0. Drive: 9 plays, 47 yards, 3:33.
- UCLA – Theo Howard 33-yard pass from Wilton Speight (J.J. Molson Kick), 7:53. Bruins 7–3. Drive: 8 plays, 75 yards, 3:34.
- UCLA – Wilton Speight 4-yard run (J.J. Molson Kick), 3:38. Bruins 14–3. Drive: 6 plays, 76 yards, 2:43.
- USC – Amon-Ra St. Brown 44-yard pass from JT Daniels (Michael Brown Kick), 0:22. Bruins 14–10. Drive: 6 plays, 75 yards, 3:16.

Second quarter

- USC – Devon Williams 5-yard return of blocked punt (Michael Brown Kick), 14:11. Trojans 17–14. Drive: 3 plays, -6 yards, 1:11.
- UCLA – Joshua Kelley 1-yard run (J.J. Molson Kick), 8:10. Bruins 21–17. Drive: 10 plays, 55 yards, 3:49.
- USC – Velus Jones Jr. 45-yard pass from J.T. Daniels (Michael Brown Kick), 5:54. Trojans 24–21. Drive: 5 plays, 75 yards, 2:16.

Third quarter

- USC – Michael Brown 22-yard field goal, 7:04. Trojans 27–21. Drive: 11 plays, 77 yards, 5:17.

Fourth quarter

- UCLA – Joshua Kelley 55-yard run (J.J. Molson Kick), 10:39. Bruins 28–27. Drive: 7 plays, 97 yards, 3:14.
- UCLA – J.J. Molson 19-yard field goal, 6:19. Bruins 31–27. Drive: 9 plays, 53 yards, 4:12.
- UCLA – J.J. Molson 48-yard field goal, 2:36. Bruins 34–27. Drive: 5 plays, 21 yards, 2:19.

Passing

- USC – #18 JT Daniels – 20/34 337 Yds – 2 TDs – 2 INTs
- UCLA – #3 Wilton Speight – 13/22 166 Yds – 1 TD – 1 INT

Rushing

- USC – #29 Vavae Malepeai – 15 runs 77 Yds
- UCLA – #27 Joshua Kelley – 40 runs 289 Yds – 2 TDs

Receiving

- USC – #6 Michael Pittman Jr. – 7 Rec 106 Yds
- UCLA – #14 Theo Howard – 5 Rec 76 Yds – 1 TD

=== Notre Dame ===
No. 3 Notre Dame Fighting Irish at USC Trojans

Quarter	1	2	3	4	Total
No. 3 Fighting Irish	0	7	10	7	24
Trojans	7	3	0	7	17

at Los Angeles Memorial Coliseum, Los Angeles, California

- Date: November 24, 2018
- Game time: 5:00 p.m. PDT
- Game weather: Temperature: 65 F • Weather: clear skies • Wind: NNW 1 MPH
- Game attendance: 59,821
- Referee: David Epperley
- TV announcers (ABC): Chris Fowler, Kirk Herbstreit and Maria Taylor

Game information

First quarter
Second quarter
Third quarter
Fourth quarter

Passing

- ND – #12 Ian Book – 22/39 352 Yds – 2 TDs – 1 INT
- USC – #18 JT Daniels – 37/51 349 Yds – 1 TD

Rushing

- ND – #2 Dexter Williams – 16 runs 97 Yds – 1 TD
- USC – #28 Aca'Cedric Ware – 13 runs 68 Yds

Receiving

- ND – #10 Chris Finke – 7 Rec 86 Yds – 1 TD
- USC – #21 Tyler Vaughns – 12 Rec 120 Yds – 1 TD

== Rankings ==
Ranking movements Legend: ██ Increase in ranking ██ Decrease in ranking — = Not ranked RV = Received votes
	Week															
Poll	Pre	1	2	3	4	5	6	7	8	9	10	11	12	13	14	Final
AP	15	17	22	—	—	—	—	RV	—	—	—	—	—	—	—	—
Coaches	15	12	21	—	RV	RV	—	RV	—	—	—	—	—	—	—	—
CFP	Not released									—	—	—	—	—	—	Not released

== Preseason ==
=== Pac-12 Media Days ===
Pac-12 media days are set for July 25, 2018, in Hollywood, California. Clay Helton (Head coach), Porter Gustin (OLB) & Cameron Smith (ILB) at Pac-12 media days. The Pac-12 media poll was released with the Trojans predicted to win the Pac-12 South division title.

Media poll (South)
Predicted finish	Team	Votes (1st place)
1	USC	225 (22)
2	Utah	209 (14)
3	Arizona	178 (3)
4	UCLA	116 (2)
5	Colorado	80 (1)
6	Arizona State	72

=== Awards and honors ===
Player	Position	Class	Award	Result (In Progress)	Reference
Coaches
Clay Helton	Head Coach	–	Dodd Trophy	Watch list	
Offense
Stephen Carr	Tailback	Sophomore	Doak Walker Award	Watch list	
Stephen Carr	Tailback	Sophomore	Maxwell Award	Watch list	
Aca'Cedric Ware	Tailback	Senior	Earl Campbell Tyler Rose Award	Watch list	
Vavae Malepeai	Tailback	(redshirt) Sophomore	Polynesian College Football Player of the Year	Watch list	
Tyler Petite	Tight end	Senior	John Mackey Award	Watch list	
Jordan Austin	Offensive guard	(redshirt) Senior	Allstate AFCA Good Works Team	Nominee	
Toa Lobendahn	Center	(redshirt) Senior	Rimington Trophy	Watch list	
Toa Lobendahn	Center	(redshirt) Senior	Outland Trophy	Watch list	
Toa Lobendahn	Center	(redshirt) Senior	Polynesian College Football Player of the Year	Watch list	
Defense
Brandon Pili	Defensive tackle	Sophomore	Polynesian College Football Player of the Year	Watch list	
Christian Rector	Defensive end	(redshirt) Junior	Bronko Nagurski Trophy	Watch list	
Christian Rector	Defensive end	(redshirt) Junior	Ted Hendricks Award	Watch list	
Porter Gustin	Outside linebacker	Senior	Bednarik Award	Watch list	
Porter Gustin	Outside linebacker	Senior	Butkus Award	Watch list	
Porter Gustin	Outside linebacker	Senior	Lott Trophy	Watch list	
Cameron Smith	Inside linebacker	Senior	Bednarik Award	Watch list	
Cameron Smith	Inside linebacker	Senior	Bronko Nagurski Trophy	Watch list	
Cameron Smith	Inside linebacker	Senior	Butkus Award	Watch list	
Cameron Smith	Inside linebacker	Senior	Lott Trophy	Watch list	
Jordan Iosefa	Linebacker	Junior	Polynesian College Football Player of the Year	Watch list	
Iman Marshall	Cornerback	Senior	Jim Thorpe Award	Watch list	
Marvell Tell	Safety	Senior	Bednarik Award	Watch list	
Marvell Tell	Safety	Senior	Bronko Nagurski Trophy	Watch list	
Marvell Tell	Safety	Senior	Jim Thorpe Award	Watch list	
Special teams
Jake Olson	Long snapper	(redshirt) Junior	Wuerffel Trophy	Watch list	

== Awards and honors ==
=== Major award semifinalists ===
Honors and Awards Source: 2018 Arizona Media Notes

== Players drafted into the NFL ==
Round	Pick	Player	Position	NFL Club
3	92	Chuma Edoga	OT	New York Jets
4	127	Iman Marshall	CB	Baltimore Ravens
5	144	Marvell Tell	S	Indianapolis Colts
5	162	Cameron Smith	LB	Minnesota Vikings

== Notes ==
- November 16, 2017 – USC's 2018 Football Schedule Announced.
- December 1, 2017 – No. 10 USC Beats No. 12 Stanford, 31–28 for Pac-12 Title.
- December 20, 2017 – USC Football Announces Early Signing Period 2018 Class.
- December 22, 2017 – Juco Defensive Lineman Caleb Tremblay Signs With USC.
- December 22, 2017 – No. 1 2019 QB recruit JT Daniels skipping senior year and enrolling at USC a year early.
- December 29, 2017 – No. 5 Ohio State Tops No. 8 USC 24–7 in Cotton Bowl Classic.
- December 29, 2017 – Defensive Back Talanoa Hufanga Signs With USC Football.
- January 3, 2018 – Sam Darnold Declares for 2018 NFL Draft.
- January 5, 2018 – USC Tailback Ronald Jones II Declares for NFL.
- January 5, 2018 – Porter Gustin reportedly set to return to USC Football for 2018 season.
- January 6, 2018 – Amon-Ra St. Brown commits to USC over Stanford, Notre Dame.
- January 8, 2018 – USC WR Deontay Burnett declares for 2018 NFL Draft.
- January 10, 2018 – Toa Lobendahn to return to USC Football for 2018 season.
- January 10, 2018 – Cameron Smith announces return to USC Football for 2018.
- January 11, 2018 – USC Football reportedly promote Bryan Ellis to quarterbacks coach.
- January 12, 2018 – Deland McCullough leaves USC Football for Kansas City Chiefs.
- January 12, 2018 – USC DB Iman Marshall will return to USC for the 2018 season.
- January 13, 2018 – USC DL Rasheem Green Declares for 2018 NFL Draft.
- January 18, 2018 – Ronnie Lott added to College Football Playoff Selection Committee.
- January 19, 2018 – Keary Colbert reportedly promoted to tight ends coach for USC Football.
- January 20, 2018 – Tee Martin gets multi-year extension to stay with USC Football.
