= Solomon Tuliaupupu =

American football player (born 2000)

No. 58 – Montana Grizzlies
- Position: Defensive end
- Class: Redshirt Senior

Personal information
- Born: March 20, 2000 (age 26)
- Listed height: 6 ft 3 in (1.91 m)
- Listed weight: 242 lb (110 kg)

Career information
- High school: Mater Dei (Santa Ana, California)
- College: USC (2018–2024); Montana (2025–present)

Awards and highlights
- High School Butkus Award (2017); USA Today High School All-American (2017); USA Today Defensive Player of the Year (2017)
- Stats at ESPN

Solomon Nokeakua-Stroud Tuliaupupu (born March 26, 2000) is an American college football defensive end for the Montana Grizzlies. He previously played for the USC Trojans.

== Early life ==
Tuliaupupu attended Claremont High School in Claremont, California before transferring to Mater Dei High School in Santa Ana, California after his sophomore year. He played his entire high school career as a middle linebacker. Despite suffering a season-ending foot injury in the playoffs of his senior season, Tuliaupupu recorded sixty-three tackles, four sacks, and won the Butkus Award.

== College career ==
Tuliaupupu was redshirted his freshman season due to a pre-season foot injury. He missed his entire redshirt freshman season due to another pre-season foot injury. He then missed his entire sophomore year due to a year-ending knee surgery. His junior year, he moved from middle linebacker to defensive end and did not see any action.

In 2022, he tallied 10 tackles and 2.5 sacks. After that, he suffered yet another injury in training camp, ending that year for him as well. In 2024, he finally saw the field again, getting 13 tackles, a sack, and a fumble recovery. On March 31, 2025, he transferred to Montana. On February 14th 2026, he was granted a ninth year of NCAA eligibility.

=== Statistics ===
Year	Team	Games		Tackles				Fumbles				Interceptions			
Year	Team	GP	GS	Cmb	Solo	Ast	Sck	FF	FR	Yds	TD	Int	Yds	TD	PD
2018	USC	DNP (injury—foot)													
2019	USC	DNP (injury—foot)													
2020	USC	DNP (injury—knee)													
2021	USC	DNP (injury—knee)													
2022	USC	14	0	10	5	5	2.5	0	0	0	0	0	0	0	0
2023	USC	DNP (injury—knee)													
2024	USC	9	0	13	8	5	1.0	0	1	0	0	0	0	0	0
2025	Montana	14	14	43	17	26	2.0	2	0	0	0	0	0	0	1
2026	Montana														
Career		37	14	66	30	36	5.5	2	1	0	0	0	0	0	1

== Personal life ==
His father was an offensive lineman at Southern Utah.
