= Caleb Wilson (American football) =

American football player (born 1996)

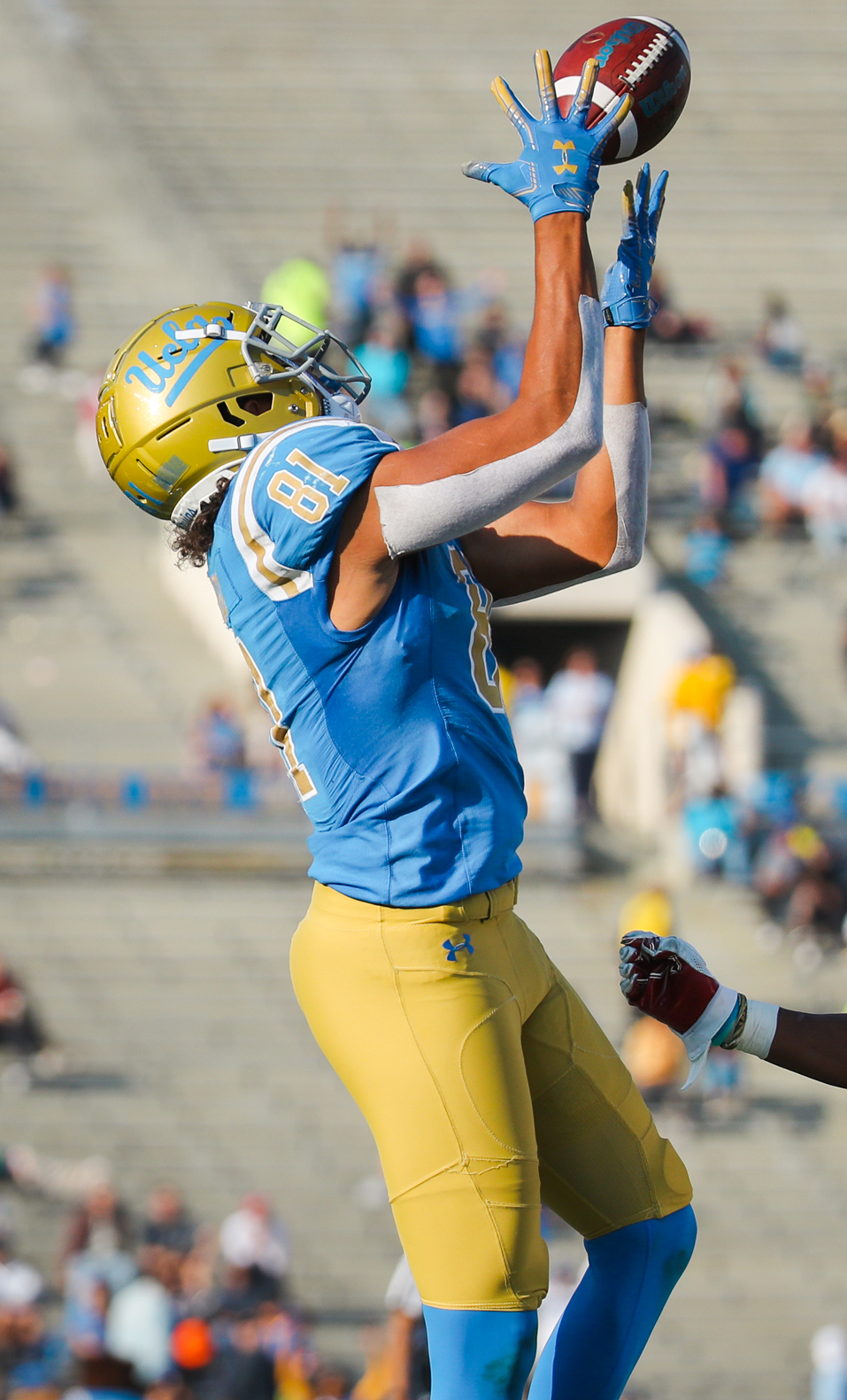
- Wilson with the UCLA Bruins in 2018

Colorado State Rams
- Title: Wide receivers coach

Personal information
- Born: July 15, 1996 (age 30); Dallas, Texas, U.S.
- Listed height: 6 ft 4 in (1.93 m)
- Listed weight: 240 lb (109 kg)

Career information
- High school: Junípero Serra (Gardena, California)
- College: UCLA
- NFL draft: 2019: 7th round, 254th overall pick

Career history

Playing
- Arizona Cardinals (2019)*; Washington Redskins (2019); Philadelphia Eagles (2020); Washington Football Team (2021)*; Denver Broncos (2021)*
- * Offseason or practice squad member only

Coaching
- Washington (2024–2025) Offensive quality control coach; Colorado State (2026–present) Wide receivers coach

Awards and highlights
- Second-team All-American (2018); First-team All-Pac-12 (2018)

Career NFL statistics
- Games: 5
- Stats at Pro Football Reference

Caleb Brandon Wilson (born July 15, 1996) is an American football coach and former professional player who was a tight end in the National Football League (NFL). He played college football for the UCLA Bruins and was selected by the Arizona Cardinals with the final pick of the 2019 NFL draft, making him that draft's Mr. Irrelevant. He was also a member of the Washington Redskins, Philadelphia Eagles and Denver Broncos. He is currently the wide receivers coach at Colorado State University.

== College career ==
Wilson originally committed to play football at Old Dominion as a quarterback, but later joined USC as a walk-on tight end so he could play for his father, and took a redshirt year. After his redshirt year during which his father was fired, Wilson transferred to the University of California, Los Angeles. Wilson played in all 12 games during his first year. In the season opener in his second year in 2017, Wilson had 15 receptions for 203 yards to help lead the Bruins to a school-record 34-point comeback in a 45–44 win over Texas A&M. His season ended prematurely after five starts when he injured his foot against Colorado.

As a junior in 2018, Wilson had a season-high 184 yards in the season finale against Stanford, and finished the year with UCLA single-season records for a tight end with 60 receptions and 965 receiving yards. He led all tight ends in the NCAA Division I Football Bowl Subdivision in receptions per game (5.0), receiving yards per game (80.4) and receiving yards. Wilson was voted a second-team All-American by Sporting News, and was named first-team All-Pac-12, the only first-team selection for the Bruins, who finished the season with a 3–9 record. On December 6, 2018, Wilson announced that he would forgo his final year of eligibility to declare for the 2019 NFL draft.

== Professional career ==
=== Arizona Cardinals ===
Wilson was selected by the Arizona Cardinals in the seventh round (254th overall) of the 2019 NFL Draft, earning him the title Mr. Irrelevant as the final pick in the draft. He was waived on August 31, 2019, but the Cardinals re-signed him to their practice squad the next day.

=== Washington Redskins ===
On December 13, 2019, Wilson was signed off the Cardinals' practice squad to the active roster of the Washington Redskins. He was waived on August 3, 2020.

=== Philadelphia Eagles ===
Wilson was claimed off waivers by the Philadelphia Eagles on August 4, 2020. He was waived on September 4, and re-signed to the practice squad two days later. He was elevated to the active roster on November 14, November 21, and November 30 for the team's Weeks 10, 11, and 12 games against the New York Giants, Cleveland Browns, and Seattle Seahawks, and reverted to the practice squad after each game. Wilson was signed to the active roster on December 26. He was waived on August 14, 2021.

=== Washington Football Team ===
Wilson was claimed off waivers by the Washington Football Team on August 15, 2021. He was waived by Washington on August 31.

=== Denver Broncos ===
On November 3, 2021, Wilson was signed to the Denver Broncos' practice squad. He was released by Denver on November 9. Wilson was re-signed by the Broncos on December 21. His contract expired when the team's season ended on January 8, 2022.

== Coaching career ==
=== Washington ===
On March 6, 2024, Wilson was hired as an offensive quality control coach for the Washington Huskies.

=== Colorado State ===
On March 11, 2026, Wilson was hired as the wide receivers coach for the Colorado State Rams.

== Personal life ==
Wilson is the son of Chris Wilson, who was selected by the Chicago Bears in the 12th round of the 1992 NFL draft. Chris was also a member of the USC coaching staff while Caleb was a player.
