= Joshua Kelley =

American football player (born 1997)

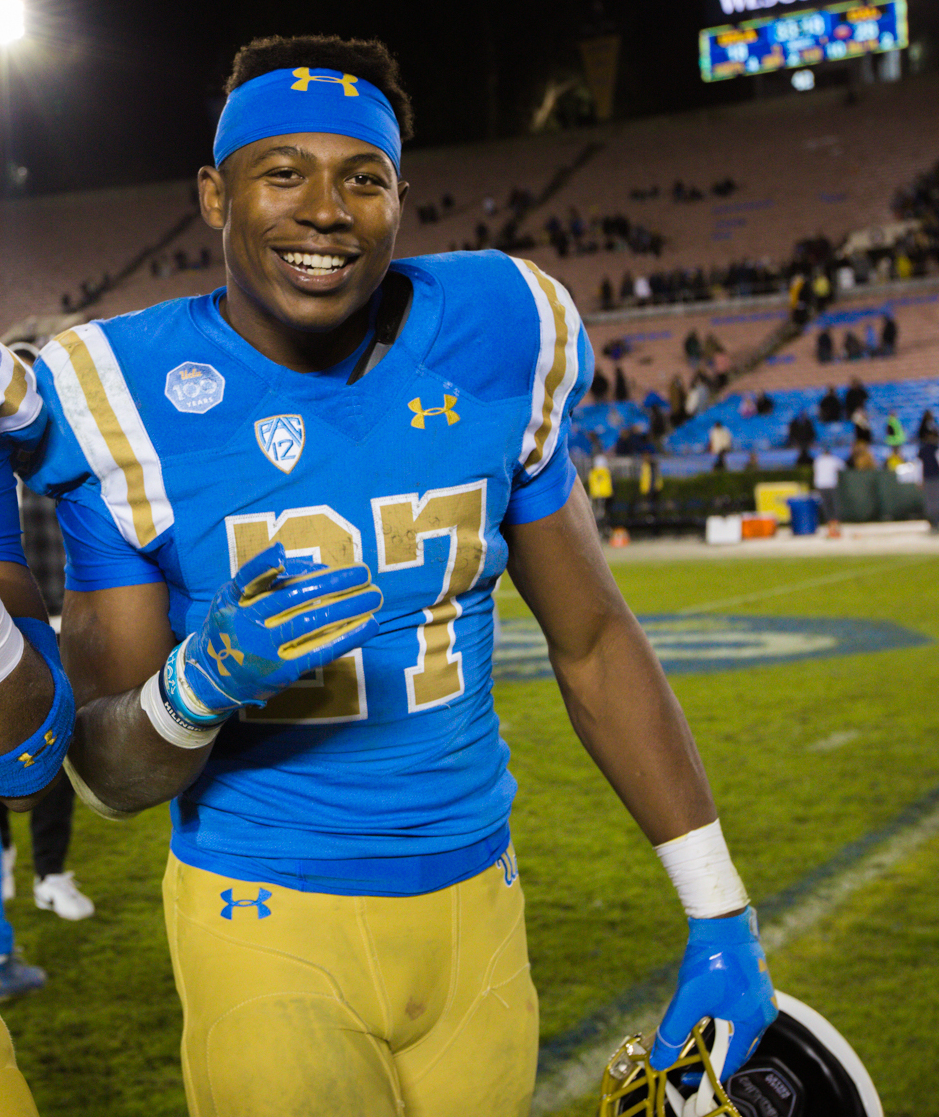
- Kelley with the UCLA Bruins in 2019

Profile
- Position: Running back

Personal information
- Born: November 20, 1997 (age 28); Inglewood, California, U.S.
- Listed height: 5 ft 11 in (1.80 m)
- Listed weight: 212 lb (96 kg)

Career information
- High school: Eastside (Lancaster, California)
- College: UC Davis (2015–2016); UCLA (2017–2019)
- NFL draft: 2020: 4th round, 112th overall pick

Career history
- Los Angeles Chargers (2020–2023); New York Giants (2024)*; Tennessee Titans (2024)
- * Offseason or practice squad member only

Awards and highlights
- Second-team All-Pac-12 (2019)

Career NFL statistics as of 2024
- Rushing yards: 1,150
- Rushing average: 3.6
- Rushing touchdowns: 6
- Receptions: 50
- Receiving yards: 319
- Stats at Pro Football Reference

Joshua Tyler Kelley (born November 20, 1997) is an American professional football running back. He began his college football career with the UC Davis Aggies before transferring to the UCLA Bruins program. Kelley rushed for 1,000 yards in each of his two seasons with the Bruins, earning second-team all-conference honors in the Pac-12 in 2019. He was selected by the Los Angeles Chargers in the fourth round of the 2020 NFL draft. He has also played for the New York Giants and Tennessee Titans.

== Early life ==
Kelley was born in Inglewood, California. His mother Jacqueline, a speech pathologist at an elementary school, raised him and his older brother Daniel as a single parent. Growing up in Lancaster in Los Angeles County, Kelley was a fan of UCLA. His mother volunteered at the University of California, Los Angeles, and he had an aunt and uncle who studied there; his uncle played on the Bruins baseball team.

Kelley attended Eastside High School and rushed for 1,903 yards and 22 touchdowns in his final two seasons with the Lions. As a senior, he earned first-team all-conference honors in the Golden League, and was named the conference's running back of the year.

== College career ==
A two-star recruit who was ranked the No. 232 running back in the class of 2015, Kelley began his career in the Football Championship Subdivision (FCS) at the University of California, Davis, the only school that pursued him. With the Aggies, he coped with injuries and shared time with another fine back in Manusomo Luuga. In his first season, Kelley was a year younger than his fellow freshmen. He did not receive a full scholarship until the start of his sophomore year, but relinquished it and transferred after the season, when head coach Ron Gould and the rest of the coaching staff were fired. Although the new staff wanted him to stay, Kelley challenged himself to reach college football's highest level. He ended his UC Davis career with 1,139 yards and seven touchdowns in two seasons. As part of his release from the school, Kelley was permitted to transfer to just two schools in California: UCLA and USC. He also received interest from Boise State.

Kelley signed as a walk-on with the Bruins of the Football Bowl Subdivision (FBS), and served on the scout team in 2017 while sitting out the year as a redshirt due to transfer rules. Leading up to the 2018 season, he encountered another coaching change when UCLA replaced Jim L. Mora with Chip Kelly. The new coach awarded a scholarship to Kelley. A redshirt junior, Kelley did not play much until Week 4 at Colorado. He was benched and did not play a week earlier against Fresno State after being outperformed during practice. In the first two weeks, he had just 11 carries for 27 yards. Following an open week in UCLA's schedule, he regrouped and ran for 124 yards in 12 carries against Colorado after being the team's best player in training sessions leading up to the game. Kelley became one of the nation's top running backs over the final two months of the season. He emerged as the Bruins' top offensive player with six 100-yard games, and UCLA's scoring increased as well. On the road in Week 6 against California, UCLA earned their first win of the season as Kelley ran for 157 yards and three touchdowns in a 37–7 victory. Against USC, Kelley had a career-high 289 yards rushing on 40 carries to help the Bruins earn their first win in four years in their crosstown rivalry with the Trojans. It was the most rushing yards for a player on either team in the history of the rivalry. He scored two touchdowns, including one on a career-long 61-yard run.

Kelley ended the season with 1,243 yards rushing, the 10th-highest single-season total in UCLA history, and his 113 rushing yards per game ranked fourth-highest in the Pac-12 Conference and ninth in the nation. He ran for at least one touchdown in each of the final eight games, and finished with 12 touchdowns to rank second in the conference. Kelley earned honorable mention in All-Pac-12 voting by conference coaches, while the Associated Press named him to their first team. He was named the Bruins' most valuable player.

In 2019, Kelley returned for his senior year after deciding against entering the NFL draft. He injured his right knee in practice, and subsequently missed most of training camp. He did not play in the season opener against Cincinnati. On October 26 against Arizona State, Kelley ran 34 times for 164 yards and a career-high four touchdowns in a 42–32 upset over the No. 24 Sun Devils. He rushed for 126 yards and two touchdowns the following week against Colorado, helping the Bruins earn their fourth win and surpass their total from a year before. In the final game of his college career, Kelley ran for 76 yards against Cal to finish the season with 1,060 yards, becoming the eighth player in UCLA history to run for 1,000 yards in consecutive seasons. His 96.4 yards rushing per game and 12 rushing touchdowns were both second in the conference behind Zack Moss of Utah. Kelley was named second-team All-Pac-12, the only Bruin to be named to either the first or second team. He ended his UCLA career with 454 rushes for 2,303 yards and 24 touchdowns. After being named to the Senior Bowl roster as a replacement for Moss, he improved his draft stock with a game-high 105 yards on 15 carries.

== Professional career ==
Pre-draft measurables
Height	Weight	Arm length	Hand span	Wingspan	40-yard dash	10-yard split	20-yard split	20-yard shuttle	Three-cone drill	Vertical jump	Broad jump	Bench press
5 ft 10 5/8 in (1.79 m)	212 lb (96 kg)	31 5/8 in (0.80 m)	9 5/8 in (0.24 m)	6 ft 4 1/4 in (1.94 m)	4.49 s	1.61 s	2.65 s	4.28 s	6.95 s	31.0 in (0.79 m)	10 ft 1 in (3.07 m)	23 reps
All values from NFL Combine

=== Los Angeles Chargers ===
Kelley was selected by the Los Angeles Chargers in the fourth round of the 2020 NFL draft with the 112th overall pick. He competed with Justin Jackson to be the backup behind Chargers featured back Austin Ekeler. In his NFL debut in the 2020 season opener, Kelley had 60 rushing yards on 12 carries and scored the team's only touchdown on a five-yard run in the fourth quarter in a 16–13 win over the Cincinnati Bengals. He again ran for over 60 yards the following week, when he had 113 yards from scrimmage (64 rushing, 49 receiving) in a loss against the Kansas City Chiefs. However, he struggled after fumbling in consecutive weeks in close games against the Carolina Panthers and Tampa Bay Buccaneers, which damaged his confidence and led to a drop in playing time.

In the 2021 season opener, Kelley was listed as inactive, as rookie Larry Rountree III received the nod as the No. 3 running back. Kelley played in 10 games during the season, finishing with 33 carries for 102 yards along with five receptions for 38 yards.

In 2022, he entered training camp stronger after dedicating himself to improving physically during the offseason. He began the season playing behind Sony Michel, who was Ekeler's primary backup. In a Week 5 win over the Cleveland Browns, Kelley had 12 touches to Michel's one, running for 49 yards and a touchdown on 10 carries and adding two catches for 33 yards. He suffered an MCL sprain in Week 6 and was placed on injured reserve on October 22, 2022. He was activated on November 26.

=== New York Giants ===
On August 15, 2024, Kelley signed with the New York Giants. He was released by the Giants as part of preliminary roster cuts on August 25.

=== Tennessee Titans ===
On October 15, 2024, Kelley signed with the Tennessee Titans' practice squad. He was promoted to the active roster on November 2. Kelley appeared in three games during the 2024 season.

== Career statistics ==
=== NFL ===
==== Regular season ====
Legend
**Bold**	Career high

Year	Team	Games		Rushing					Receiving				
Year	Team	GP	GS	Att	Yds	Avg	Lng	TD	Rec	Yds	Avg	Lng	TD
2020	LAC	14	0	**111**	354	3.2	33	**2**	**23**	**148**	6.4	**35**	0
2021	LAC	10	0	33	102	3.1	14	0	5	38	**7.6**	17	0
2022	LAC	13	1	69	287	**4.2**	22	**2**	14	101	7.2	22	0
2023	LAC	**17**	**3**	107	**405**	3.8	**49**	**2**	8	32	4.0	6	0
2024	TEN	3	0	1	2	2.0	2	0	0	0	–	–	0
Career		57	4	321	1,150	3.6	49	6	50	319	6.4	35	0

==== Playoffs ====
Year	Team	Games		Rushing					Receiving				
Year	Team	GP	GS	Att	Yds	Avg	Lng	TD	Rec	Yds	Avg	Lng	TD
2022	LAC	1	0	7	20	2.9	5	0	1	8	8.0	8	0
Career		1	0	7	20	2.9	5	0	1	8	8.0	8	0

=== College ===
Season	Team	GP	Rushing				Receiving			
Season	Team	GP	Att	Yds	Avg	TD	Rec	Yds	Avg	TD
2018	UCLA	11	225	1,243	4.9	12	27	193	7.1	0
2019	UCLA	11	229	1,060	4.6	12	11	71	6.5	0
Career		22	454	2,303	5.1	24	38	264	6.9	0

== Personal life ==
Kelley is a Christian. He is married to Mikaela Kelley.
