= Alec Anderson (American football, born 1999) =

American football player (born 1999)

No. 70 – Buffalo Bills
- Positions: Guard, center
- Roster status: Active

Personal information
- Born: October 3, 1999 (age 27); Pomona, California, U.S.
- Listed height: 6 ft 5 in (1.96 m)
- Listed weight: 305 lb (138 kg)

Career information
- High school: Etiwanda (CA)
- College: UCLA (2018–2021)
- NFL draft: 2022: undrafted

Career history
- Buffalo Bills (2022–present)

Career NFL statistics as of Week 2, 2026
- Games played: 36
- Games started: 8
- Fumble recoveries: 1
- Stats at Pro Football Reference

Alec James Anderson (born October 3, 1999) is an American professional football guard and center for the Buffalo Bills of the National Football League (NFL). He played college football for the UCLA Bruins.

== College career ==
Anderson played college football for UCLA from 2018 to 2021, appearing in 30 games with 17 starts. He got his opportunity to become the starting right tackle for UCLA in 2020 when fellow lineman Jake Burton transferred to Baylor. The previous year he played in 10 games, starting 3.

== Professional career ==
Pre-draft measurables
| Height | Weight | Arm length | Hand span | Wingspan | 40-yard dash | 10-yard split | 20-yard split | 20-yard shuttle | Three-cone drill | Vertical jump | Broad jump | Bench press |
|---|---|---|---|---|---|---|---|---|---|---|---|---|
| 6 ft 5 1/8 in (1.96 m) | 304 lb (138 kg) | 33 1/4 in (0.84 m) | 10 3/8 in (0.26 m) | 6 ft 9 1/4 in (2.06 m) | 5.36 s | 1.94 s | 3.15 s | 5.03 s | 8.14 s | 24.0 in (0.61 m) | 8 ft 6 in (2.59 m) | 21 reps |
All values from Pro Day

In December 2021, Anderson declared for the NFL draft. After going undrafted in the 2022 NFL draft, he signed with the Buffalo Bills. He was cut by the Bills during training camp but was subsequently signed to their practice squad. On January 2, 2023, Anderson was elevated to the active roster. He signed a reserve/future contract with Buffalo on January 23.

After making the Bills' roster in 2024, Anderson played in every game for the next two seasons as one of the team's primary backups. He signed a one-year contract extension with Buffalo on February 20, 2026.

== Personal life ==
Alec is from Fontana, CA and went to Etiwanda High School in Rancho Cucamonga, CA. Anderson's father is German, African American, and Native American. Anderson's mother is Irish. Anderson is not an enrolled member of the Seneca Nation, however, is reported to have a cultural affiliation rather than a direct family lineage. His father, Anders, is originally from Germany.
