= Leki =

Leki may refer to:

== People ==
- Ananias Leki Dago (born 1970), Ivorian photographer
- Leki (singer) (born 1978), Congolese singer
- Leki Dukpa (born 1989), Bhutanese football player
- Leki Fotu (August 23, 1998), American American football player
- Leki Maka (born 1985), Tongan boxer

== Places ==
- Azagi Leki or Aşağı Ləki, Azerbaijan
- Leki or Lyaki or Ləki, Azerbaijan
- Orta Ləki or Leki, Azerbaijan
- Yuxari Leki or Yuxarı Ləki, Azerbaijan
- Łęki (disambiguation), several places in Poland

== Other ==
- Leki language, spoken in Iran and Turkey
- LeKi or Lempäälän Kisa, a Finnish ice hockey team
- Leki Lenhart, German sports good company
