= 2019 Pac-12 Conference football season =

American college football season

- League: NCAA Division I Football Bowl Subdivision
- Sport: Football
- Duration: August 29, 2019; January 1, 2020
- Teams: 12
- TV partner(s): Fox Sports Media Group, (Fox, FS1), ESPN Family, (ABC, ESPN, ESPN2, ESPNU), and Pac-12 Networks

2020 NFL Draft
- Top draft pick: QB Justin Herbert, Oregon
- Picked by: Los Angeles Chargers, 6th overall

Regular season
- Top scorer: Blake Mazza, K, Washington State Cougars (112 points)
- North champions: Oregon
- North runners-up: California
- South champions: Utah
- South runners-up: USC

Pac-12 Championship
- Champions: Oregon
- Runners-up: Utah
- Finals MVP: C. J. Verdell, RB

Football seasons
- 2018 2020

2019 Pac-12 Conference football standings
	Conf.			Overall
Team	W		L	W		L
North Division
No. 5 Oregon xy$	8	–	1	12	–	2
California	4	–	5	8	–	5
Washington	4	–	5	8	–	5
Oregon State	4	–	5	5	–	7
Washington State	3	–	6	6	–	7
Stanford	3	–	6	4	–	8
South Division
No. 16 Utah xy	8	–	1	11	–	3
USC	7	–	2	8	–	5
Arizona State	4	–	5	8	–	5
UCLA	4	–	5	4	–	8
Colorado	3	–	6	5	–	7
Arizona	2	–	7	4	–	8
Championship: Oregon 37, Utah 15
$ – Conference champion; x – Division champion/co-champions; y – Championship game participant; Rankings from AP Poll

The 2019 Pac-12 Conference football season was the 41st season of Pac–12 football taking place during the 2019 NCAA Division I FBS football season. The season began on August 29, 2019, and end with the 2019 Pac–12 Championship Game on December 6, 2019, at Levi Stadium in Santa Clara, California. The Pac-12 was a Power Five Conference under the College Football Playoff format along with the Atlantic Coast Conference, the Big 12 Conference, Big Ten Conference, and the Southeastern Conference. For the 2019 season, the Pac-12 was the ninth for the twelve teams divided into two divisions of six teams each, named North and South. The entire schedule was released on December 4, 2018.

== Preseason ==
2019 Pac-12 Spring Football and number of signees on signing day:

North Division

- California – 24
- Oregon – 27
- Oregon State – 19
- Stanford – 23
- Washington – 23
- Washington State – 20

South Division

- Arizona – 19
- Arizona State – 21
- Colorado – 25
- UCLA – 19
- USC – 25
- Utah – 18

=== Recruiting classes ===
Rankings
Team	ESPN	Rivals	Scout & 24/7	Signees
Arizona	57	57	56	19
Arizona State	26	37	31	21
California	46	38	42	24
Colorado	48	45	44	25
Oregon	6	7	5	27
Oregon State	64	67	68	19
Stanford	20	23	21	23
UCLA	53	44	41	19
USC	19	19	20	25
Utah	59	46	45	18
Washington	15	16	16	23
Washington State	60	63	65	20

=== Pac-12 Media Days ===
The Pac-12 will conduct its 2019 Pac-12 media days at the Loews Hollywood Hotel, in Hollywood, California, on July 24 on the Pac-12 Network.

The teams and representatives in respective order were as follows:

- Pac-12 Commissioner – Larry Scott
- Arizona – Kevin Sumlin (HC), Khalil Tate (QB) and J. J. Taylor (RB)
- Arizona State – Herm Edwards, Eno Benjamin (RB), Cohl Cabral (C)
- California – Justin Wilcox (HC), Evan Weaver (LB), Camryn Bynum (CB)
- Colorado – Mel Tucker (HC), Laviska Shenault (WR), Nate Landman (LB)
- Oregon – Mario Cristobal (HC), Justin Herbert (QB), Troy Dye (LB)
- Oregon State – Jonathan Smith (HC), Jermar Jefferson (RB), Isaiah Hodgins (WR)
- Stanford – David Shaw (HC), K. J. Costello (QB), LB Casey Toohill (LB)
- UCLA – Chip Kelly (HC), Joshua Kelley (RB), Krys Barnes (LB)
- USC – Clay Helton (HC), Michael Pittman Jr. (WR), DE Christian Rector (DE)
- Utah – Kyle Whittingham (HC), Zack Moss (RB), Bradlee Anae (DE)
- Washington – Chris Petersen (HC), Nick Harris (C), Myles Bryant (DB)
- Washington State – Mike Leach (HC), Liam Ryan (OL), Jahad Woods (LB)

==== Preseason Media polls ====
The preseason polls will be released on July 24, 2019. Since 1992, the credentialed media has gotten the preseason champion correct just five times. Only eight times has the preseason pick even made it to the Pac-12 title game. Below are the results of the media poll with total points received next to each school and first-place votes in parentheses. For the 2019 poll, Utah was voted as the favorite to win both the South Division and the Pac–12 Championship Game.

North
Predicted finish	Team	Votes (1st place)
1	Oregon	190 (17)
2	Washington	189 (17)
3	Stanford	129
4	Washington State	108 (1)
5	California	81
6	Oregon State	38

South
Predicted finish	Team	Votes (1st place)
1	Utah	206 (33)
2	USC	167 (2)
3	Arizona State	118
4	UCLA	118
5	Arizona	85
6	Colorado	46

Media poll (Pac-12 Championship)
Rank	Team	Votes
1	Utah	12
2	Oregon	11
3	Washington	9
4	USC	2
5	Washington State	1

=== Preseason awards ===
==== Preseason All-Pac-12 ====
First Team

Position	Player	Class	Team
First Team Offense
QB	Justin Herbert	Sr.	Oregon
RB	Eno Benjamin	Jr.	Arizona State
RB	Zack Moss	Sr.	Utah
WR	Michael Pittman Jr.	Sr.	USC
WR	Laviska Shenault	Jr.	Colorado
TE	Colby Parkinson	Jr.	Stanford
OL	Nick Harris	Sr.	Washington
OL	Trey Adams	RSSr.	Washington (2)
OL	Shane Lemieux	RSr.	Oregon (2)
OL	Calvin Throckmorton	RSSr.	Oregon (3)
OL	Walker Little	Jr.	Stanford (2)
First Team Defense
DL	Bradlee Anae	Sr.	Utah (2)
DL	Leki Fotu	Sr.	Utah (3)
DL	Mustafa Johnson	So.	Colorado (2)
DL	Jay Tufele	RSSo.	USC
LB	Troy Dye	Sr.	Oregon (4)
LB	Colin Schooler	Jr.	Arizona
LB	Evan Weaver	Sr.	California
DB	Paulson Adebo	RSo.	Stanford (3)
DB	Julian Blackmon	Sr.	Utah (4)
DB	Myles Bryant	Sr.	Washington (4)
DB	Jaylon Johnson	Jr.	Utah (5)
First Team Special Teams
PK	Jet Toner	Sr.	Stanford (4)
P	Oscar Draguicevich III	RSJr.	Washington State
RT	J. J. Taylor	RSJr.	Arizona (2)

Second Team

Position	Player	Class	Team
Second Team Offense
QB	Anthony Gordon	Sr.	Washington State
RB	Jermar Jefferson	So.	Oregon State
RB	J. J. Taylor	RSJr.	Arizona
WR	Isaiah Hodgins	Jr.	Oregon State (2)
WR	Amon-Ra St. Brown	So.	USC
TE	Hunter Bryant	Jr.	Washington
OL	Cohl Cabral	Sr.	Arizona State
OL	Gus Lavaka	Sr.	Oregon State (3)
OL	Darrin Paulo	Sr.	Utah
OL	Penei Sewell	So.	Oregon
OL	Abraham Lucas	RSSo.	Washington State
Second Team Defense
DL	Luc Bequette	RSSr.	California
DL	John Penisini	Sr.	Utah (2)
DL	Christian Rector	RSSr.	USC (2)
DL	Jordon Scott	Jr.	Oregon (2)
LB	Nate Landman	Jr.	Colorado
LB	Merlin Robertson	So.	Arizona State (2)
LB	Jahad Woods	RSJr.	Washington State (2)
DB	Camryn Bynum	RSJr.	California (2)
DB	Ashtyn Davis	RSSr.	California (3)
DB	Thomas Graham Jr.	Jr.	Oregon (3)
DB	Darnay Holmes	Jr.	UCLA
Second Team Special Teams
PK	Brandon Ruiz	Jr.	Arizona State (3)
P	Steven Coutts	RSSr.	California (4)
RT	Britain Covey	Jr.	Utah (3)

== Head coaches ==
=== Coaching changes ===
There was only one coaching change following the 2019 season including Mel Tucker with Colorado.

=== Coaches ===
Team	Head coach	Years at school	Overall record	Record at school	Pac–12 record
Arizona	Kevin Sumlin	2	95–51	9–8	6–5
Arizona State	Herm Edwards	2	11–7	11–7	6–5
California	Justin Wilcox	3	16–14	16–14	7–13
Colorado	Mel Tucker	1	0–0	0–0	0–0
Oregon	Mario Cristobal	2	39–53	12–6	6–4
Oregon State	Jonathan Smith	2	3–13	3–13	1–9
Stanford	David Shaw	9	84–29	84–29	56–18
UCLA	Chip Kelly	2	50–20	4–13	4–7
USC	Clay Helton	6	35–19	35–19	25–11
Utah	Kyle Whittingham	15	124–62	124–62	35–38
Washington	Chris Petersen	6	143–34	51–22	31–16
Washington State	Mike Leach	8	136–86	52–42	33–32

== Rankings ==
		Pre	Wk 2	Wk 3	Wk 4	Wk 5	Wk 6	Wk 7	Wk 8	Wk 9	Wk 10	Wk 11	Wk 12	Wk 13	Wk 14	Wk 15	Wk 16	Final
Arizona	AP	RV						RV										
Arizona	C				RV	RV		RV										
Arizona	CFP	Not released																
Arizona State	AP	RV	RV	RV	24	RV	20	18	17	24					RV	RV	RV	RV
Arizona State	C	RV	RV	RV	24	RV	RV	24	17	24	RV					RV	RV	
Arizona State	CFP	Not released																
California	AP			RV	23	15	RV	RV	RV							RV	RV	RV
California	C			RV	23	16	RV	RV	RV								RV	RV
California	CFP	Not released																
Colorado	AP			RV		RV	RV											
Colorado	C			RV		RV	RV											
Colorado	CFP	Not released																
Oregon	AP	11	16	15	16	13	13	13	12	11	7	7	6	6	14	13	7	5
Oregon	C	13	18	17	17	13	13	13	12	11	8	7	6	6	13	13	6	5
Oregon	CFP	Not released										7	6	6	14	13	6	
Oregon State	AP																	
Oregon State	C																	
Oregon State	CFP	Not released																
Stanford	AP	25	23															
Stanford	C	23	23	RV														
Stanford	CFP	Not released																
UCLA	AP																	
UCLA	C	RV																
UCLA	CFP	Not released																
USC	AP	RV	RV	24		21	RV	RV		RV	RV		RV	RV	25	24	22	RV
USC	C	RV	RV	24		25	RV							RV	25	24	23	RV
USC	CFP	Not released												23	22	22	22	
Utah	AP	14	13	11	10	19	17	15	13	12	9	8	8	7	6	5	12	16
Utah	C	15	15	12	11	19	17	15	14	12	10	9	9	8	6	5	10	16
Utah	CFP	Not released										8	7	7	6	5	11	
Washington	AP	13	14	23	22	17	15	RV	25	RV	RV	RV	RV			RV	RV	RV
Washington	C	12	12	21	21	17	16	RV	23	RV	RV							RV
Washington	CFP	Not released																
Washington State	AP	23	22	20	19	RV												
Washington State	C	21	21	20	19	RV	RV	RV										
Washington State	CFP	Not released																

Legend
	Improvement in ranking
	Drop in ranking
	Not ranked previous week
	No change in ranking from previous week
RV	Received votes but were not ranked in Top 25 of poll
т	Tied with team above or below also with this symbol

== Schedules ==
Index to colors and formatting
Pac-12 member won
Pac-12 member lost
Pac-12 teams in **bold**

All times Pacific time. Pac-12 teams in bold.

Rankings reflect those of the AP poll for that week.

=== Regular season ===
The regular season began on August 24, 2019, and will end on November 30, 2019.

==== Week 1 ====
Date	Time	Visiting team	Home team	Site	TV	Result	Attendance	Ref.
August 24	7:30 p.m.	**Arizona**	Hawaii	Aloha Stadium • Honolulu, HI	CBSSN	**L** 38–45	22,396	
August 29	4:00 p.m.	**UCLA**	Cincinnati	Nippert Stadium • Cincinnati, OH	ESPN	**L** 14–24	38,032	
August 29	7:00 p.m.	Kent State	**Arizona State**	Sun Devil Stadium • Tempe, AZ	P12N	**W** 30–7	47,413	
August 29	7:15 p.m.	No. 14 **Utah**	BYU	LaVell Edwards Stadium • Provo, UT (Holy War)	ESPN	**W** 30–12	61,626	
August 30	7:00 p.m.	**Colorado**	Colorado State	Broncos Stadium at Mile High • Denver, CO (Rocky Mountain Showdown)	ESPN	**W** 52–31	66,997	
August 30	7:30 p.m.	Oklahoma State	**Oregon State**	Reser Stadium • Corvallis, OR	FS1	**L** 36–52	31,681	
August 31	12:00 p.m.	Eastern Washington	No. 13 **Washington**	Husky Stadium • Seattle, WA	P12N	**W** 47–14	65,709	
August 31	1:00 p.m.	Northwestern	No. 25 **Stanford**	Stanford Stadium • Stanford, CA	FOX	**W** 17–7	37,179	
August 31	3:30 p.m.	UC Davis	**California**	California Memorial Stadium • Berkeley, CA	P12N	**W** 27–13	44,168	
August 31	4:30 p.m.	No. 11 **Oregon**	No. 16 Auburn	AT&T Stadium • Arlington, TX	ABC	**L** 21–27	60,662	
August 31	7:00 p.m.	New Mexico State	No. 23 **Washington State**	Martin Stadium • Pullman, WA	P12N	**W** 58–7	27,228	
August 31	7:30 p.m.	Fresno State	**USC**	LA Memorial Coliseum • Los Angeles, CA	ESPN	**W** 31–23	57,329	
^{#}Rankings from AP Poll released prior to game. All times are in Pacific Time.

==== Week 2 ====
Date	Time	Visiting team	Home team	Site	TV	Result	Attendance	Ref.
September 6	7:00 p.m.	Sacramento State	**Arizona State**	Sun Devil Stadium • Tempe, AZ	P12N	**W** 19–7	42,286	
September 7	11:00 a.m.	Northern Illinois	No. 13 **Utah**	Rice–Eccles Stadium • Salt Lake City, UT	P12N	**W** 35–17	45,919	
September 7	12:30 p.m.	No. 25 Nebraska	**Colorado**	Folsom Field • Boulder, CO	FOX	**W** 34–31 ^{OT}	52,829	
September 7	1:15 p.m.	San Diego State	**UCLA**	Rose Bowl • Pasadena, CA	P12N	**L** 14–23	36,951	
September 7	2:00 p.m.	Northern Colorado	No. 22 **Washington State**	Martin Stadium • Pullman, WA	P12N	**W** 59–17	27,585	
September 7	4:30 pm	Nevada	No. 16 **Oregon**	Autzen Stadium • Eugene, OR	P12N	**W** 77–6	50,920	
September 7	7:30 p.m.	**California**	No. 14 **Washington**	Husky Stadium • Seattle, WA	FS1	**CAL** 20–19	66,327	
September 7	7:30 p.m.	No. 23 **Stanford**	**USC**	LA Memorial Coliseum • Los Angeles, CA	ESPN	**USC** 45–20	62,109	
September 7	7:45 p.m.	Northern Arizona	**Arizona**	Arizona Stadium • Tucson, AZ	P12N	**W** 65–41	40,741	
September 7	9:00 p.m.	**Oregon State**	Hawaii	Aloha Stadium • Honolulu, HI	SPEC HI	**L** 28–31	26,807	
^{#}Rankings from AP Poll released prior to game. All times are in Pacific Time.

==== Week 3 ====
Date	Time	Visiting team	Home team	Site	TV	Result	Attendance	Ref.
September 13	6:15 p.m.	No. 20 **Washington State**	Houston	NRG Stadium • Houston, TX	ESPN	**W** 31–24	40,523	
September 14	10:00 a.m.	Air Force	**Colorado**	Folsom Field • Boulder, CO	P12N	**L** 23–30 ^{OT}	49,282	
September 14	12:30 p.m.	**Stanford**	No. 17 UCF	Spectrum Stadium • Orlando, FL	ESPN	**L** 27–45	45,008	
September 14	12:30 p.m.	No. 24 **USC**	BYU	LaVell Edwards Stadium • Provo, UT	ABC	**L** 27–30 ^{OT}	62,546	
September 14	1:00 p.m.	**Arizona State**	No. 18 Michigan State	Spartan Stadium • East Lansing, MI	FOX	**W** 10–7	73,531	
September 14	1:15 p.m.	North Texas	**California**	California Memorial Stadium • Berkeley, CA	P12N	**W** 23–17	35,268	
September 14	1:15 p.m.	Cal Poly	**Oregon State**	Reser Stadium • Corvallis, OR	P12N	**W** 45–7	33,585	
September 14	1:15 p.m.	Idaho State	No. 11 **Utah**	Rice–Eccles Stadium • Salt Lake City, UT	P12N	**W** 31–0	45,989	
September 14	4:30 p.m.	Hawaii	No. 23 **Washington**	Husky Stadium • Seattle, WA	P12N	**W** 52–20	67,589	
September 14	5:00 p.m.	No. 5 Oklahoma	**UCLA**	Rose Bowl • Pasadena, CA	FOX	**L** 14–48	52,578	
September 14	7:30 p.m.	Texas Tech	**Arizona**	Arizona Stadium • Tucson, AZ	ESPN	**W** 28–14	37,307	
September 14	7:45 p.m.	Montana	No. 15 **Oregon**	Autzen Stadium • Eugene, OR	P12N	**W** 35–3	49,098	
^{#}Rankings from AP Poll released prior to game. All times are in Pacific Time.

==== Week 4 ====
Date	Time	Visiting team	Home team	Site	TV	Result	Attendance	Ref.
September 20	6:00 p.m.	No. 10 **Utah**	**USC**	LA Memorial Coliseum • Los Angeles, CA	FS1	**USC** 30–23	55,719	
September 21	9:00 a.m.	No. 23 **California**	Ole Miss	Vaught–Hemingway Stadium • Oxford, MS	ESPNU	**W** 28–20	46,850	
September 21	12:30 p.m.	No. 22 **Washington**	BYU	LaVell Edwards Stadium • Provo, UT	ABC	**W** 45–19	62,117	
September 21	4:00 p.m.	No. 16 **Oregon**	**Stanford**	Stanford Stadium • Stanford, CA	ESPN	**ORE** 21–6	39,249	
September 21	7:00 p.m.	**Colorado**	No. 24 **Arizona State**	Sun Devil Stadium • Tempe, AZ	P12N	**COLO** 34–31	45,786	
September 21	7:30 p.m.	**UCLA**	No. 19 **Washington State**	Martin Stadium • Pullman, WA	ESPN	**UCLA** 67–63	32,952	
^{#}Rankings from AP Poll released prior to game. All times are in Pacific Time.

Date	Bye Week	
September 21	Arizona	Oregon State

==== Week 5 ====
Date	Time	Visiting team	Home team	Site	TV	Result	Attendance	Ref.
September 27	7:30 p.m.	**Arizona State**	No. 15 **California**	California Memorial Stadium • Berkeley, CA	ESPN	**ASU** 24–17	47,532	
September 28	12:30 p.m.	No. 21 **USC**	No. 17 **Washington**	Husky Stadium • Seattle, WA	FOX	**WASH** 28–14	66,975	
September 28	4:00 p.m.	**Stanford**	**Oregon State**	Reser Stadium • Corevallis, OR	P12N	**STAN** 31–28	32,326	
September 28	7:00 p.m.	**Washington State**	No. 19 **Utah**	Rice-Eccles Stadium • Salt Lake City, UT	FS1	**UTAH** 38–18	46,115	
September 28	7:30 p.m.	**UCLA**	**Arizona**	Arizona Stadium • Tucson, AZ	ESPN	**ARZ** 20–17	38,283	
^{#}Rankings from AP Poll released prior to game. All times are in Pacific Time.

Date	Bye Week	
September 28	Colorado	No. 13 Oregon

==== Week 6 ====
Date	Time	Visiting team	Home team	Site	TV	Result	Attendance	Ref.
October 5	1:30 p.m.	**Arizona**	**Colorado**	Folsom Field • Folsom, CO	P12N	**ARZ** 35–30	52,569	
October 5	5:00 p.m.	**California**	No. 13 **Oregon**	Autzen Stadium • Eugene, OR	FOX	**ORE** 17–7	54,766	
October 5	6:00 p.m.	**Oregon State**	**UCLA**	Rose Bowl • Pasadena, CA	P12N	**OSU** 48–31	48,532	
October 5	7:30 p.m.	No. 15 **Washington**	**Stanford**	Stanford Stadium • Stanford, CA	ESPN	**STAN** 23–13	33,225	
^{#}Rankings from AP Poll released prior to game. All times are in Pacific Time.

Date	Bye Week			
October 5	No. 20 Arizona State	USC	No. 17 Utah	Washington State

==== Week 7 ====
Date	Time	Visiting team	Home team	Site	TV	Result	Attendance	Ref.
October 11	7:00 p.m.	**Colorado**	No. 13 **Oregon**	Autzen Stadium • Eugene, OR	FS1	**ORE** 45–3	50,529	
October 12	12:30 p.m.	**Washington State**	No. 18 **Arizona State**	Sun Devil Stadium • Tempe, AZ	P12N	**ASU** 38–34	48,536	
October 12	4:30 p.m.	**USC**	No. 9 Notre Dame	Notre Dame Stadium • South Bend, IN (Jeweled Shillelagh)	NBC	**L** 27–30	77,622	
October 12	5:00 p.m.	No. 15 **Utah**	**Oregon State**	Reser Stadium • Corvallis, OR	P12N	**UTAH** 52–7	31,730	
October 12	8:00 p.m.	**Washington**	**Arizona**	Arizona Stadium • Tucson, AZ	FS1	**WASH** 51–27	47,933	
^{#}Rankings from AP Poll released prior to game. All times are in Pacific Time.

Date	Bye Week		
October 12	California	Stanford	UCLA

==== Week 8 ====
Date	Time	Visiting team	Home team	Site	TV	Result	Attendance	Ref.
October 17	6:00 p.m.	**UCLA**	**Stanford**	Stanford Stadium • Stanford, CA	ESPN	**UCLA** 34–16	31,464	
October 19	11:30 a.m.	**Oregon State**	**California**	California Memorial Stadium • Berkeley, CA	P12N	**OSU** 21–17	42,064	
October 19	12:30 p.m.	No. 12 **Oregon**	No. 25 **Washington**	Husky Stadium • Seattle, WA	ABC	**ORE** 35–31	70,867	
October 19	3:00 p.m.	No. 17 **Arizona State**	No. 13 **Utah**	Rice–Eccles Stadium • Salt Lake City, UT	P12N	**UTAH** 21–3	46,402	
October 19	4:00 p.m.	**Colorado**	**Washington State**	Martin Stadium • Pullman, WA	ESPNU	**WSU** 41–10	28,514	
October 19	6:30 p.m.	**Arizona**	**USC**	LA Memorial Coliseum • Los Angeles, CA	P12N	**USC** 41–14	53,826	
^{#}Rankings from AP Poll released prior to game. All times are in Pacific Time.

==== Week 9 ====
Date	Time	Visiting team	Home team	Site	TV	Result	Attendance	Ref.
October 25	6:00 p.m.	**USC**	**Colorado**	Folsom Field • Boulder, CO	ESPN2	**USC** 35–31	48,913	
October 26	12:30 p.m.	**Arizona**	**Stanford**	Stanford Stadium • Stanford, CA	P12N	**STAN** 41–31	31,711	
October 26	4:30 p.m.	No. 24 **Arizona State**	**UCLA**	Rose Bowl • Los Angeles, CA	P12N	**UCLA** 42–32	39,811	
October 26	7:00 p.m.	**California**	No. 12 **Utah**	Rice–Eccles Stadium • Salt Lake City, UT	FS1	**UTAH** 35–0	46,626	
October 26	7:30 p.m.	**Washington State**	No. 11 **Oregon**	Autzen Stadium • Eugene, OR	ESPN	**ORE** 37–35	59,361	
^{#}Rankings from AP Poll released prior to game. All times are in Pacific Time.

Date	Bye Week	
October 26	Oregon State	Washington

==== Week 10 ====
Date	Time	Visiting team	Home team	Site	TV	Result	Attendance	Ref.
November 2	1:00 p.m.	No. 9 **Utah**	**Washington**	Husky Stadium • Seattle, WA	FOX	**UTAH** 33–28	69,270	
November 2	1:30 p.m.	**Oregon State**	**Arizona**	Arizona Stadium • Tucson, AZ	P12N	**OSU** 56–38	36,939	
November 2	5:00 p.m.	No. 7 **Oregon**	**USC**	LA Memorial Coliseum • Los Angeles, CA	FOX	**ORE** 56–24	63,011	
November 2	6:00 p.m.	**Colorado**	**UCLA**	Rose Bowl • Pasadena, CA	P12N	**UCLA** 31–14	47,118	
^{#}Rankings from AP Poll released prior to game. All times are in Pacific Time.

Date	Bye Week			
November 2	Arizona State	California	Stanford	Washington State

==== Week 11 ====
Date	Time	Visiting team	Home team	Site	TV	Result	Attendance	Ref.
November 8	7:30 p.m.	**Washington**	**Oregon State**	Reser Stadium • Corvallis, OR	FS1	**WASH** 19–7	34,244	
November 9	12:00 p.m.	**Stanford**	**Colorado**	Folsom Field • Boulder, CO	P12N	**COLO** 16–13	49,224	
November 9	12:30 p.m.	**USC**	**Arizona State**	Sun Devil Stadium • Tempe, AZ	ABC	**USC** 31–26	54,191	
November 9	4:00 p.m.	**Washington State**	**California**	California Memorial Stadium • Berkeley, CA	P12N	**CAL** 33–20	39,168	
^{#}Rankings from AP Poll released prior to game. All times are in Pacific Time.

Date	Bye Week			
November 9	Arizona	No. 7 Oregon	UCLA	No. 8 Utah

==== Week 12 ====
Date	Time	Visiting team	Home team	Site	TV	Result	Attendance	Ref.
November 16	1:30 p.m.	**Stanford**	**Washington State**	Martin Stadium • Pullman, WA	P12N	**WSU** 49–22	32,952	
November 16	4:30 p.m.	**Arizona State**	**Oregon State**	Reser Stadium • Corvallis, OR	FS1	**OSU** 35–34	30,980	
November 16	5:00 p.m.	**UCLA**	No. 8 **Utah**	Rice-Eccles Stadium • Salt Lake City, UT	FOX	**UTAH** 49–3	47,307	
November 16	7:30 p.m.	**Arizona**	No. 6 **Oregon**	Autzen Stadium • Eugene, OR	ESPN	**ORE** 34–6	54,219	
November 16	8:00 p.m.	**USC**	**California**	California Memorial Stadium • Berkeley, CA	FS1	**USC** 41–17	46,397	
^{#}Rankings from AP Poll released prior to game. All times are in Pacific Time.

Date	Bye Week	
November 16	Colorado	Washington

==== Week 13 ====
Date	Time	Visiting team	Home team	Site	TV	Result	Attendance	Ref.
November 23	12:30 p.m.	**UCLA**	No. 23 **USC**	LA Memorial Coliseum • Los Angeles, CA (Victory Bell)	ABC	**USC** 52–35	64,156	
November 23	1:00 p.m.	**California**	**Stanford**	Stanford Stadium • Stanford, CA (122nd Big Game/Stanford Axe)	P12N	**CAL** 24–20	48,904	
November 23	4:30 p.m.	No. 6 **Oregon**	**Arizona State**	Sun Devil Stadium • Tempe, AZ	ABC	**ASU** 31–28	51,875	
November 23	6:00 p.m.	**Oregon State**	**Washington State**	Martin Stadium • Pullman, WA	P12N	**WSU** 54–53	22,016	
November 23	7:00 p.m.	**Washington**	**Colorado**	Folsom Field • Boulder, CO	ESPN	**COLO** 20–14	44,618	
November 23	7:00 p.m.	No. 7 **Utah**	**Arizona**	Arizona Stadium • Tucson, AZ	FS1	**UTAH** 35–7	35,991	
^{#}Rankings from AP Poll released prior to game. All times are in Pacific Time.

==== Week 14 ====
Date	Time	Visiting team	Home team	Site	TV	Result	Attendance	Ref.
November 29	1:00 p.m.	**Washington State**	**Washington**	Husky Stadium • Seattle, WA (Apple Cup)	FOX	**WASH** 31–13	70,931	
November 30	1:00 p.m.	**Oregon State**	No. 14 **Oregon**	Autzen Stadium • Eugene, CO (Civil War)	P12N	**ORE** 24–10	56,243	
November 30	1:00 p.m.	No. 16 Notre Dame	**Stanford**	Stanford Stadium • Stanford, CA (Legends Trophy)	FOX	**L** 24–45	37,391	
November 30	4:30 p.m.	**Colorado**	No. 6 **Utah**	Rice-Eccles Stadium • Salt Lake City, UT (Rumble in the Rockies)	ABC	**UTAH** 45–15	46,879	
November 30	7:00 p.m.	**Arizona**	**Arizona State**	Sun Devil Stadium • Tempe, AZ (Territorial Cup)	ESPN	**ASU** 24–14	54,074	
November 30	7:30 p.m.	**California**	**UCLA**	Rose Bowl • Pasadena, CA (California–UCLA rivalry)	FS1	**CAL** 28–18	38,102	
^{#}Rankings from AP Poll released prior to game. All times are in Pacific Time.

Date	Bye Week
November 30	USC

=== Pac-12 Championship Game ===
The Pac-12 Championship Game was played on December 6, 2019 at Levi's Stadium in Santa Clara, CA. It featured the teams with the best conference records from each division, the North (Oregon) and the South (Utah). This was the ninth championship game.

Date	Time	Visiting team	Home team	Site	TV	Result	Attendance	Ref.
December 6	5:00 p.m.	No. 13 **Oregon**	No. 5 **Utah**	Levi's Stadium • Santa Clara, CA	ABC	**ORE** 37–15	38,679	
^{#}Rankings from AP Poll released prior to game. All times are in Pacific Time.

== Pac-12 records vs Other Conferences ==
2019–2020 records against non-conference foes:

Regular season

Power 5 Conferences	Record
ACC	0–0
Big Ten	3–0
Big 12	1–2
BYU/Notre Dame	2–3
SEC	1–1
Power 5 Total	7–6
Other FBS Conferences	Record
American	1–2
C-USA	1–0
Independents (Excluding BYU and Notre Dame)	1–0
MAC	2–0
Mountain West	4–4
Sun Belt	0–0
Other FBS Total	9–6
FCS Opponents	Record
Football Championship Subdivision	8–0
Total Non-Conference Record	24–11

Post Season

Power Conferences 5	Record
ACC	1–0
Big Ten	1–1
Big 12	1–1
BYU/Notre Dame	0-0
SEC	0–0
Power 5 Total	3–2
Other FBS Conferences	Record
American	0–0
C–USA	0–0
Independents (Excluding Notre Dame)	0–0
MAC	0–0
Mountain West	1–1
Sun Belt	0-0
Other FBS Total	1–1
Total Bowl Record	4–3

=== Pac-12 vs Power Five matchups ===
This is a list of the power conference teams (ACC, Big 10, Big 12, Notre Dame and SEC) that the Pac-12 plays in the non-conference games. Although the NCAA does not consider BYU a "Power Five" school, the Pac-12 considers games against BYU as satisfying its "Power Five" scheduling requirement. All rankings are from the AP Poll at the time of the game.

Date	Visitor	Home	Site	Significance	Score
August 29	No. 14 Utah	BYU	LaVell Edwards Stadium • Provo, Utah	Holy War	W 30–12
August 30	Oklahoma State	Oregon State	Reser Stadium • Corvallis, Oregon		L 36–52
August 31	No. 16 Auburn	No. 11 Oregon	AT&T Stadium • Arlington, Texas		L 21–27
August 31	Northwestern	No. 25 Stanford	Stanford Stadium • Stanford, California		W 17–7
September 7	No. 25 Nebraska	Colorado	Folsom Field • Boulder, Colorado	Colorado–Nebraska football rivalry	W 34–31^{OT}
September 14	Arizona State	No. 18 Michigan State	Spartan Stadium • East Lansing, Michigan		W 10–7
September 14	No. 5 Oklahoma	UCLA	Rose Bowl • Pasadena, California		L 14–48
September 14	Texas Tech	Arizona	Arizona Stadium • Tucson, Arizona		W 28–14
September 14	No. 24 USC	BYU	LaVell Edwards Stadium • Provo, Utah		L 27–30^{OT}
September 21	No. 23 California	Ole Miss	Vaught–Hemingway Stadium • Oxford, Mississippi		W 28–20
September 21	No. 22 Washington	BYU	LaVell Edwards Stadium • Provo, Utah		W 45–19
October 12	USC	No. 9 Notre Dame	Notre Dame Stadium • South Bend, Indiana	Jeweled Shillelagh	L 27–30
November 30	No. 16 Notre Dame	Stanford	Stanford Stadium • Stanford, California	Legends Trophy	L 24–45

=== Pac-12 vs Group of Five matchups ===
The following games include Pac-12 teams competing against teams from the American, C-USA, MAC, Mountain West or Sun Belt.

Date	Conference	Visitor	Home	Site	Score
August 24	Mountain West	Arizona	Hawaii	Aloha Stadium • Honolulu, HI	L 38–45
August 29	American	UCLA	Cincinnati	Nippert Stadium • Cincinnati, OH	L 14–24
August 29	MAC	Kent State	Arizona State	Sun Devils Stadium • Tempe, AZ	W 30–7
August 30	Mountain West	Colorado	Colorado State	Broncos Stadium at Mile High • Denver, CO	W 52–31
August 31	Mountain West	Fresno State	USC	United Airlines Memorial Coliseum • Los Angeles, CA	W 31–23
September 7	MAC	Northern Illinois	No. 14 Utah	Rice–Eccles Stadium • Salt Lake City, UT	W 35–17
September 7	Mountain West	San Diego State	UCLA	Rose Bowl • Pasadena, CA	L 14–23
September 7	Mountain West	Nevada	No. 16 Oregon	Autzen Stadium • Eugene, OR	W 77–6
September 7	Mountain West	Oregon State	Hawaii	Aloha Stadium • Honolulu, HI	L 28–31
September 13	American	No. 20 Washington State	Houston	NRG Stadium • Houston, TX	W 31-24
September 14	Mountain West	Air Force	Colorado	Folsom Field • Boulder, CO	L 23–30^{OT}
September 14	American	Stanford	No. 17 UCF	Spectrum Stadium • Orlando, FL	L 27–45
September 14	C-USA	North Texas	California	California Memorial Stadium • Berkeley, CA	W 23–17
September 14	Mountain West	Hawaii	No. 23 Washington	Husky Stadium • Seattle, WA	W 52–20

=== Pac-12 vs FBS independents matchups ===
The following games include Pac-12 teams competing against FBS Independents, which includes Army, Liberty, New Mexico State, or UMass.

Date	Visitor	Home	Site	Score
August 31	New Mexico State	No. 23 Washington State	Martin Stadium • Pullman, WA	W 58–7

=== Pac-12 vs FCS matchups ===
Date	Visitor	Home	Site	Score
August 31	Eastern Washington	No. 13 Washington	Husky Stadium • Seattle, WA	W 47–14
August 31	UC Davis	California	California Memorial Stadium • Berkeley, CA	W 27–13
September 6	Sacramento State	Arizona State	Sun Devils Stadium • Tempe, AZ	W 19–7
September 7	Northern Colorado	No. 22 Washington State	Martin Stadium • Pullman, WA	W 59–17
September 7	Northern Arizona	Arizona	Arizona Stadium • Tucson, AZ	W 65–41
September 14	Cal Poly	Oregon State	Reser Stadium • Corvallis, OR	W 45–7
September 14	Idaho State	No. 11 Utah	Rice–Eccles Stadium • Salt Lake City, UT	W 31–0
September 14	Montana	No. 15 Oregon	Autzen Stadium • Eugene, OR	W 35–3

== Postseason ==
=== Bowl games ===
Legend
Pac-12 win
Pac-12 loss

Bowl game	Date	Site	Television	Time (PST)	Pac-12 team	Opponent	Score	Attendance
Mitsubishi Motors Las Vegas Bowl	December 21	Sam Boyd Stadium • Las Vegas, NV	ABC	4:30 p.m.	**Washington**	No. 19 Boise State	**W** 38–7	34,197
San Diego County Credit Union Holiday Bowl	December 27	SDCCU Stadium • San Diego, CA	FS1	5:00 p.m.	No. 22 **USC**	No. 16 Iowa	**L** 24–49	50,123
Cheez-It Bowl	December 27	Chase Field • Phoenix, AZ	ESPN	7:15 p.m.	**Washington State**	Air Force	**L** 21–31	34,105
Redbox Bowl	December 30	Levi's Stadium • Santa Clara, CA	FOX	1:00 p.m.	**California**	Illinois	**W** 35–20	34,177
Tony the Tiger Sun Bowl	December 31	Sun Bowl • El Paso, TX	CBS	11:00 a.m.	**Arizona State**	Florida State	**W** 20–14	42,812
Valero Alamo Bowl	December 31	Alamodome • San Antonio, TX	ESPN	4:30 p.m.	No. 11 **Utah**	Texas	**L** 10–38	60,147
**New Year's Six Bowl**
Rose Bowl	January 1	Rose Bowl • Pasadena, CA	ESPN	2:00 p.m.	**No. 6 Oregon**	No. 8 Wisconsin	**W** 28–27	90,462

Rankings are from CFP rankings. All times Pacific Time Zone. Pac-12 teams shown in bold.

=== Selection of teams ===
- **Bowl eligible: Arizona State, California, Oregon, USC, Utah, Washington, Washington State**
- **Bowl-ineligible: Arizona, Colorado, Oregon State, Stanford, UCLA**

== Awards and honors ==
=== Player of the week honors ===
Week	Offensive			Defensive			Special Teams			Offensive Line			Defensive Line			Freshman		
Week	Player	Team	Position	Player	Team	Position	Player	Team	Position	Player	Team	Position	Player	Team	Position	Player	Team	Position
Week 1 (Sept. 3)	Anthony Gordon	Washington State	QB	Francis Bernard	Utah	LB	Michael Turk	Arizona State	P	Liam Ryan	Washington State	OG	Benning Potoa'e	Washington	DE	Jayden Daniels	Arizona State	QB
Week 2 (Sept. 9)	Kedon Slovis	USC	QB	Evan Weaver	California	LB	Cristian Zendejas	Arizona State	PK	Austin Jackson	USC	OT	Mustafa Johnson Jr.	Colorado	DE	Kedon Slovis	USC	QB
Week 3 (Sept. 16)	Anthony Gordon (2)	Washington State	QB	Myles Bryant	Washington	DB	Greg Thomas	California	PK	Penei Sewell	Oregon	LT	Jermayne Lole	Arizona State	DL	Jayden Daniels (2)	Arizona State	QB
Week 4 (Sept. 23)	Dorian Thompson-Robinson	UCLA	QB	Evan Weaver (2)	California	LB	Demetric Felton	UCLA	RB/KR	Penei Sewell (2)	Oregon	LT	Gus Cumberlander	Oregon	DE	Kyle Philips	UCLA	WR
Week 5 (Sept. 30)	Tyler Huntley	Utah	QB	Francis Bernard (2)	Utah	LB	Jet Toner	Stanford	PK	Cohl Cabral	Arizona State	C	George Lea	Arizona State	DT	Grant Gunnell	Arizona	QB
Week 6 (Oct. 7)	Jake Luton	Oregon State	QB	Paulson Adebo	Stanford	CB	Daniel Rodriguez	Oregon State	P	Drew Dalman	Stanford	C	Kayvon Thibodeaux	Oregon	DE	Simi Fehoko	Stanford	WR
Week 7 (Oct. 14)	Brandon Aiyuk	Arizona State	WR	Verone McKinley III	Oregon	S	Lucas Havrisik	Arizona	PK	Penei Sewell (3)	Oregon	LT	Ryan Bowman	Washington	LB	Jayden Daniels (3)	Arizona State	QB
Week 8 (Oct. 21)	Justin Herbert	Oregon	QB	Bradlee Anae	Utah	DE	Daniel Rodriguez (2)	Oregon State	P	Calvin Throckmorton	Oregon	RT	Bradlee Anae	Utah	DE	Kyle Philips (2)	UCLA	WR
Week 9 (Oct. 28)	C. J. Verdell	Oregon	RB	Paulson Adebo (2)	Stanford	CB	Camden Lewis	Oregon	PK	Shane Lemieux	Oregon	OG	Leki Fotu	Utah	DT	Kedon Slovis (2)	USC	QB
Week 10 (Nov. 4)	Tyler Huntley (2)	Utah	QB	Brady Breeze	Oregon	S	Mykael Wright	Oregon	KR	Calvin Throckmorton (2)	Oregon	RT	John Penisini	Utah	DT	Omar Speights	Oregon State	ILB
Week 11 (Nov. 11)	Kedon Slovis (2)	USC	QB	Edefuan Ulofoshio	Washington	LB	Evan Price	Colorado	PK	Arlington Hambright	Colorado	LT	Joe Tryon-Shoyinka	Washington	DE	Kenan Christon	USC	RB
Week 12 (Nov. 18)	Anthony Gordon (3)	Washington State	QB	Julian Blackmon	Utah	S	Brandon Aiyuk	Arizona State	PR/KR/WR	Shane Lemieux (2)	Oregon	RG	Mika Tafua	Utah	DE	Drake London	USC	WR
Week 13 (Nov. 25)	Jayden Daniels	Arizona State	QB	Talanoa Hufanga	USC	S	Alex Kinney	Colorado	P	Abraham Lucas	Washington State	RT	Bradlee Anae (2)	Utah	DE	Jayden Daniels (4)	Arizona State	QB
Week 14 (Dec. 2)	Brant Kuithe	Utah	TE	Jack Jones	Arizona State	CB	Mykael Wright (2)	Oregon	JR/CB	Penei Sewell (4)	Oregon	LT	Joe Tryon-Shoyinka (2)	Washington	DE	Trent McDuffie	Washington	CB

=== Pac-12 Individual Awards ===
The following individuals received postseason honors as voted by the Pac-12 Conference football coaches at the end of the season

Award	Player	School
Offensive Player of the Year	Zack Moss, RB, Sr.	Utah
Defensive Player of the Year	Evan Weaver, LB, Sr.	California
Offensive Freshman of the Year	Kedon Slovis, QB, Fr.	USC
Defensive Freshman of the Year	Kayvon Thibodeaux, DE, Fr.	Oregon
Scholar Athlete of the Year	Justin Herbert, QB, Sr.	Oregon
Coach of the Year	Kyle Whittingham	Utah

=== All-conference teams ===
The following players earned All-Pac-12 honors. Any teams showing (_) following their name are indicating the number of All-Pac-12 Conference Honors awarded to that university for 1st team and 2nd team respectively. Utah leads the Pac-12 with 8 First team and 2 Second team, followed by Washington with 5 First team and 4 Second team, USC with 3 First team and 5 Second team, Arizona State with 5 First team and 1 Second team, Oregon with 2 First team and 3 Second team, Washington State and Stanford with 1 First team and 3 Second team, Colorado and California with 1 First team and 2 Second team, Oregon State with 3 Second team, UCLA with 1 Second team and Arizona receiving none for either team

First team
Position	Player	Class	Team
First Team Offense
QB	Tyler Huntley	Sr.	Utah
RB	Eno Benjamin (2)	Jr.	Arizona State
RB	Zack Moss	Sr.	Utah (2)
WR	Brandon Aiyuk	Sr.	Arizona State (2)
WR	Michael Pittman Jr.	Sr.	USC
TE	Hunter Bryant	Jr.	Washington
OL	Trey Adams (2)	Sr.	Washington (2)
OL	Nick Harris (2)	Sr	Washington (3)
OL	Austin Jackson	Jr.	USC (2)
OL	Darrin Paulo	Jr.	Utah (3)
OL	Penei Sewell	So.	Oregon
First Team Defense
DL	Bradlee Anae (2)	Sr.	Utah (4)
DL	Leki Fotu (2)	Sr.	Utah (5)
DL	Levi Onwuzurike	Jr.	Washington (4)
DL	Jay Tufele	RSo.	USC (3)
LB	Francis Bernard	Sr.	Utah (6)
LB	Nate Landman	Jr.	Colorado
LB	Evan Weaver	Sr.	California
DB	Paulson Adebo (2)	Jr.	Stanford
DB	Julian Blackmon	Sr.	Utah (7)
DB	Jaylon Johnson	Jr.	Utah (8)
DB	Elijah Molden	Jr.	Washington (5)
First Team Special Teams
PK	Blake Mazza	So.	Washington State
P	Michael Turk	RSo.	Arizona State (3)
RT	Brandon Aiyuk	Sr.	Arizona State (4)
AP/ST	Brady Breeze	Jr.	Oregon (2)
AP/ST	Case Hatch	Fr.	Arizona State (5)

Second team
Position	Player	Class	Team
Second Team Offense
QB	Anthony Gordon	Sr.	Washington State
RB	Joshua Kelley	Sr.	UCLA
RB	C. J. Verdell	So.	Oregon
WR	Isaiah Hodgins	Jr.	Oregon State
WR	Laviska Shenault	Jr.	Colorado
TE	Brant Kuithe	So.	Utah
TE	Colby Parkinson	Jr.	Stanford
OL	Blake Brandel	RSr.	Oregon State (2)
OL	Cohl Cabral	Sr.	Arizona State
OL	Drew Dalman	Jr.	Stanford (2)
OL	Shane Lemieux (2)	Jr.	Oregon (2)
OL	Abraham Lucas (2)	RFr.	Washington State (2)
OL	Alijah Vera-Tucker	RSo.	USC
Second Team Defense
DL	Ryan Bowman	Jr.	Washington
DL	Drake Jackson	Fr.	USC (2)
DL	John Penisini	Sr.	Utah (2)
DL	Joe Tryon-Shoyinka	So.	Washington (2)
LB	Troy Dye (2)	Sr.	Oregon (3)
LB	Hamilcar Rashed Jr.	RJr.	Oregon State (3)
LB	Casey Toohill	Sr.	Stanford (3)
DB	Myles Bryant	Sr.	Washington (3)
DB	Camryn Bynum	Jr.	California
DB	Ashtyn Davis	Sr.	California (2)
DB	Talanoa Hufanga	So.	USC (3)
Second Team Special Teams
PK	Peyton Henry	So.	Washington (4)
P	Alex Kinney	Sr.	Colorado (2)
RT	Velus Jones Jr.	RJr.	USC (4)
AP/ST	Travion Brown	Fr.	Washington State (3)
AP/ST	Michael Pittman Jr.	Sr.	USC (5)

Honorable mentions

- ARIZONA: DB Lorenzo Burns, RJr.; OL Cody Creason, RSr.; LB Colin Schooler, Jr.; RB J. J. Taylor, RJr.; Jace Whittaker, RSr.
- ARIZONA STATE: WR Frank Darby, RJr.; DB Jack Jones, RJr.; LB Khaylan Kearse-Thomas, RSr.; DL Jermayne Lole, So.; OL Dohnovan West, Fr.; DB Kobe Williams, Sr.
- CALIFORNIA: OL Jake Curhan, Jr.; LB Kuony Deng, Jr.; LB Cameron Goode, Jr.; DB Jaylinn Hawkins, Sr.; DL Zeandae Johnson, Sr.
- COLORADO: WR Tony Brown, Sr.; OL Arlington Hambright, Grad.; LB Davion Taylor, Sr.
- OREGON: DB Thomas Graham Jr., Jr.; OL Jake Hanson, Sr.; QB Justin Herbert, Sr.; DB Jevon Holland, So.; DB Deommodore Lenoir, Jr.; DL Jordon Scott, Jr.; DL Kayvon Thibodeaux, Fr.; OL Calvin Throckmorton, Sr.; RS Mykael Wright, Fr.
- OREGON STATE: OL Brandon Kipper, RSo.; QB Jake Luton, RSr.; TE Noah Togiai, RSr.
- STANFORD: DL Thomas Booker, So.; LB Curtis Robinson, Sr.; OL Foster Sarell, Jr.; RS Connor Wedington, Jr.
- UCLA: TE Devin Asiasi, Jr.; LB Krys Barnes, Sr.; DB Darnay Holmes, Jr.; P Wade Lees, Grad.,
- USC: DB Olaijah Griffin, So.; LB John Houston Jr., RSr.; PK Chase McGrath, RSo.; WR Amon-Ra St. Brown, So.; QB Kedon Slovis, Fr.; WR Tyler Vaughns, RJr.
- UTAH: DB Terrell Burgess, Sr.; OL Nick Ford; DB Javelin Guidry, Jr.; LB Devin Lloyd, So.; OL Simi Moala, RFr.; DL Mika Tafua, So.; OL Orlando Umana, Jr.
- WASHINGTON: RB Salvon Ahmed, Jr.; DB Kyler Gordon, RFr.; P Joel Whitford, Sr.
- WASHINGTON STATE: RB Max Borghi, So.; OL Josh Watson, RJr.; WR Easop Winston, Sr.; LB Jahad Woods, RJr.

=== All-Americans ===
Currently, the NCAA compiles consensus all-America teams in the sports of Division I-FBS football and Division I men's basketball using a point system computed from All-America teams named by coaches associations or media sources. The system consists of three points for a first-team honor, two points for second-team honor, and one point for third-team honor. Honorable mention and fourth team or lower recognitions are not accorded any points. College Football All-American consensus teams are compiled by position and the player accumulating the most points at each position is named first team consensus all-American. Currently, the NCAA recognizes All-Americans selected by the AP, AFCA, FWAA, TSN, and the WCFF to determine Consensus and Unanimous All-Americans. Any player named to the First Team by all five of the NCAA-recognized selectors is deemed a Unanimous All-American.

Position	Player	School	Selector	Unanimous	Consensus
First Team All-Americans
DE	Bradlee Anae	Utah	AFCA, FWAA, TSN, WCFF		✓
OT	Penei Sewell	Oregon	AFCA, AP, FWAA, TSN, WCFF	✓	✓
LB	Evan Weaver	California	AFCA, AP, FWAA, TSN, WCFF	✓	✓

Position	Player	School	Selector	Unanimous	Consensus
Second Team All-Americans
KR	Brandon Aiyuk	Arizona State	FWAA		
TE	Hunter Bryant	Washington	AP		
S	Julian Blackmon	Utah	AFCA, AP		
DT	Leki Fotu	Utah	WCFF		
CB	Jaylon Johnson	Utah	AP, WCFF		
G	Shane Lemieux	Oregon	AP, TSN		
WR	Michael Pittman Jr.	USC	AFCA, AP, WCFF		✓
LB	Hamilcar Rashed Jr.	Oregon State	AP, FWAA, WCFF		✓

Position	Player	School	Selector	Unanimous	Consensus
Third Team All-Americans
All-Purpose	Brandon Aiyuk	Arizona State	AP		
DE	Bradlee Anae	Utah	AP		
DT	Leki Fotu	Utah	AP		
RB	Zack Moss	Utah	AP		
T	Calvin Throckmorton	Oregon	AP		

*AFCA All-America Team (AFCA)
*Walter Camp All-America Team
*AP All-America teams
*Sporting News All-America Team
*Football Writers Association of America All-America Team (FWAA)
*Sports Illustrated All-America Team
*Report All-America Team (BR)
*College Football News All-America Team (CFN)
*ESPN All-America Team
*CBS Sports All-America Team
*Athlon Sports All-America Team (Athlon)
*The Athletic All-America Team
*USA Today All-America Team

=== National award winners ===
2019 College Football Award Winners

== Home game attendance ==
Team	Stadium	Capacity	Game 1	Game 2	Game 3	Game 4	Game 5	Game 6	Game 7	Total	Average	% of Capacity
Arizona	Arizona Stadium	55,675	40,741	37,307	38,283	47,933†	36,939	35,991	—	237,194	39,533	71.01%
Arizona State	Sun Devil Stadium	57,078	47,413	42,286	45,786	48,536	54,191†	51,875	54,074	344,161	49,166	86.14%
California	California Memorial Stadium	62,467	44,168	35,268	47,532†	42,064	39,168	46,397	—	254,597	42,433	67.93%
Colorado	Folsom Field	50,183	**52,829†**	49,282	**52,569**	48,913	49,224	44,618	—	297,435	49,573	98.78%
Oregon	Autzen Stadium	54,000	50,920	49,098	**54,766**	50,529	**59,361†**	**54,219**	**56,243**	375,136	53,591	99.24%
Oregon State	Reser Stadium	43,363	31,681	33,585	32,326	31,730	34,244†	30,980	—	194,546	32,425	74.78%
Stanford	Stanford Stadium	50,424	37,179	39,249	33,225	31,464	31,711	48,904†	37,391	259,123	37,018	73.41%
UCLA	Rose Bowl	80,616	36,951	52,578†	48,532	39,811	47,118	38,102	—	263,092	43,849	54.39%
USC	Los Angeles Memorial Coliseum	76,750	57,329	62,109	55,719	53,826	63,011	64,156†	—	356,150	59,359	77.34%
Utah	Rice–Eccles Stadium	45,807	**45,919**	**45,989**	**46,115**	**46,402**	**46,626**	**47,307†**	**46,879**	325,237	**46,463**	101.43%
Washington	Husky Stadium	70,083	65,709	66,327	67,589	66,975	**70,867**	69,270	**70,931†**	477,668	68,239	97.37%
Washington State	Martin Stadium	32,952	27,228	27,585	**32,952**	28,514	**32,952†**	22,016	—	149,231	28,542	86.62%

Bold – Exceed capacity
†Season High

== NFL draft ==
The following list includes all Pac-12 players who were drafted in the 2020 NFL draft.

Round #	Pick #	NFL team	Player	Position	College
1	6	Los Angeles Chargers	Justin Herbert	QB	Oregon
1	18	Miami Dolphins	Austin Jackson	OT	USC
1	25	San Francisco 49ers	Brandon Aiyuk	WR	Arizona State
2	34	Indianapolis Colts	Michael Pittman Jr.	WR	USC
2	42	Jacksonville Jaguars	Laviska Shenault	WR	Colorado
2	50	Chicago Bears	Jaylon Johnson	CB	Utah
3	68	New York Jets	Ashtyn Davis	S	California
3	85	Indianapolis Colts	Julian Blackmon	S	Utah
3	86	Buffalo Bills	Zack Moss	RB	Utah
3	91	New England Patriots	Devin Asiasi	TE	UCLA
3	103	Philadelphia Eagles	Davion Taylor	OLB	Colorado
3	104	Los Angeles Rams	Terrell Burgess	S	Utah
4	110	New York Giants	Darnay Holmes	CB	UCLA
4	112	Los Angeles Chargers	Joshua Kelley	RB	UCLA
4	114	Arizona Cardinals	Leki Fotu	DT	Utah
4	122	Indianapolis Colts	Jacob Eason	QB	Washington
4	132	Minnesota Vikings	Troy Dye	LB	Oregon
4	133	Seattle Seahawks	Colby Parkinson	TE	Stanford
4	134	Atlanta Falcons	Jaylinn Hawkins	S	California
5	150	New York Giants	Shane Lemieux	G	Oregon
5	160	Cleveland Browns	Nick Harris	C	Washington
5	179	Dallas Cowboys	Bradlee Anae	DE	Utah
6	189	Jacksonville Jaguars	Jake Luton	QB	Oregon State
6	197	Detroit Lions	John Penisini	DT	Utah
6	202	Arizona Cardinals	Evan Weaver	LB	California
6	203	Minnesota Vikings	Blake Brandel	OT	Oregon State
6	207	Buffalo Bills	Isaiah Hodgins	WR	Oregon State
6	208	Green Bay Packers	Jake Hanson	C	Oregon
6	212	Indianapolis Colts	Dezmon Patmon	WR	Washington State
7	222	Arizona Cardinals	Eno Benjamin	RB	Arizona State
7	226	Chicago Bears	Arlington Hambright	G	Colorado
7	233	Philadelphia Eagles	Casey Toohill	OLB	Stanford

=== Total picks by school ===
Team	Round 1	Round 2	Round 3	Round 4	Round 5	Round 6	Round 7	Total
Arizona	0	0	0	0	0	0	0	0
Arizona State	1	0	0	0	0	0	1	2
California	0	0	1	1	0	1	0	3
Colorado	0	1	1	0	0	0	1	3
Oregon	1	0	0	1	1	1	0	4
Oregon State	0	0	0	0	0	3	0	3
Stanford	0	0	0	1	0	0	1	2
UCLA	0	0	1	2	0	0	0	3
USC	1	1	0	0	0	0	0	2
Utah	0	1	3	1	1	1	0	7
Washington	0	0	0	1	1	0	0	2
Washington State	0	0	0	0	0	1	0	1
Total	3	3	6	7	3	7	3	32
