= Sitaleki =

Sitaleki is a given name of Tongan origin. Notable people with the name include:

- Sitaleki Akauola (born 1992), Tongan rugby league player
- Sitaleki Timani (born 1986), Tongan-Australian rugby union player
- Leki Maka (born 1985), New Zealand boxer
