= John Penisini =

American football player (born 1997)

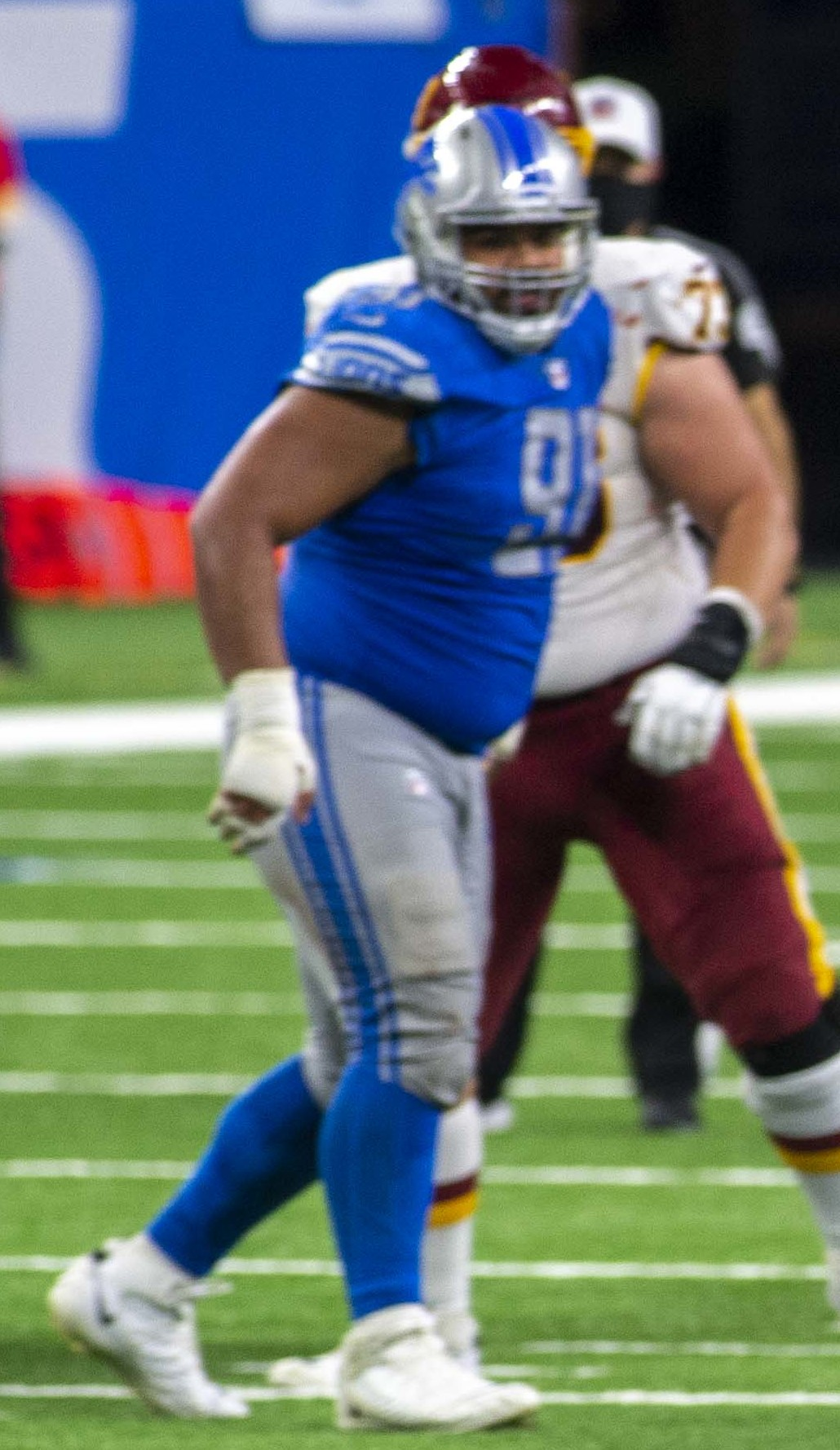
- Penisini with the Detroit Lions in 2020

No. 91, 98
- Position: Nose tackle

Personal information
- Born: May 31, 1997 (age 29); California, U.S.
- Listed height: 6 ft 2 in (1.88 m)
- Listed weight: 335 lb (152 kg)

Career information
- High school: West Jordan (West Jordan, Utah)
- College: Snow (2015); Utah (2016–2019)
- NFL draft: 2020: 6th round, 197th overall pick

Career history
- Detroit Lions (2020–2021); Carolina Panthers (2023)*; New Orleans Saints (2023)*
- * Offseason or practice squad member only

Awards and highlights
- 2× Second-team All-Pac-12 (2018, 2019)

Career NFL statistics as of 2023
- Total tackles: 46
- Sacks: 1.0
- Pass deflections: 1
- Fumble recoveries: 1
- Stats at Pro Football Reference

John Nau Penisini (born May 31, 1997) is an American former professional football player who was a nose tackle in the National Football League (NFL). He played college football at Snow College before transferring to Utah and was selected by the Detroit Lions in the sixth round of the 2020 NFL draft.

== Early life and college ==
Penisini was born in California to Tongan immigrant parents. He moved with his family to Utah when he was eight and graduated from West Jordan High School in West Jordan, Utah. Penisini began his collegiate career at Snow College. During his freshman season, he recorded 40 tackles, 6.5 tackles-for-loss, three sacks and a forced fumble. Following the season he was named an All-Western States Football League honorable mention. He transferred to Utah for his sophomore season and sat out the 2016 season. During the 2017 season, Penisini played in 12 games, including one start, where he recorded four tackles and one sack.

During the 2018 season, Penisini played in all 14 games, where he recorded seven tackles-for-loss, two sacks, and 38 tackles. His 38 tackles ranked second on the team. During the 2018 Pac-12 Football Championship Game, he recorded three tackles and a blocked field goal in a 3–10 loss to Washington. Following the season, he was named to the second-team All-Pac 12. During the 2019 season, Penisini played in all 14 games, with 13 starts, where he recorded seven tackles-for-loss, two sacks, two forced fumbles and 38 tackles. His two forced fumbles tied for the team lead, and ranked eighth in the Pac-12 Conference. He was named the Pac-12 Defensive Lineman of the Week for the week ending November 4, 2019, after he tied his career-high in tackles with seven that included a sack and a forced fumble in a 33–28 victory over Washington. Following the season, he was again named to the second-team All-Pac 12.

== Professional career ==
Pre-draft measurables
Height	Weight	Arm length	Hand span	20-yard shuttle	Vertical jump	Bench press
6 ft 1 3/8 in (1.86 m)	318 lb (144 kg)	32 7/8 in (0.84 m)	10 1/2 in (0.27 m)	4.93 s	25.5 in (0.65 m)	23 reps
All values from NFL Combine

=== Detroit Lions ===
Penisini was selected by the Detroit Lions in the sixth round (197th overall) of the 2020 NFL draft. On May 22, 2020, the Lions signed Penisini to a four-year contract.

In Week 11 against the Carolina Panthers, Penisini recorded his first career sack on P. J. Walker during the 20–0 loss. In Week 13 against the Chicago Bears, Penisini recovered a fumble forced by teammate Romeo Okwara on Mitchell Trubisky late in the fourth quarter to set up the Lions’ game winning touchdown during the 34–30 win.

Penisini announced his retirement from professional football on June 11, 2022.

=== Carolina Panthers ===
On April 10, 2023, Penisini came out of retirement and signed with Carolina Panthers. He was waived due to a failed physical on August 1, 2023.

=== New Orleans Saints ===
On December 7, 2023, Penisini was signed to the practice squad of the New Orleans Saints. Following the end of the 2023 regular season, the Saints signed him to a reserve/future contract on January 8, 2024.

On May 13, 2024, Penisini was waived by the Saints.
