= Myles Bryant =

American football player (born 1998)

No. 27 – Detroit Lions
- Position: Safety
- Roster status: Practice squad

Personal information
- Born: January 2, 1998 (age 28); Pasadena, California, U.S.
- Listed height: 5 ft 9 in (1.75 m)
- Listed weight: 185 lb (84 kg)

Career information
- High school: Loyola (Los Angeles)
- College: Washington (2016–2019)
- NFL draft: 2020: undrafted

Career history
- New England Patriots (2020–2023); Houston Texans (2024–2025); Cleveland Browns (2026)*; Detroit Lions (2026)*
- * Offseason or practice squad member only

Awards and highlights
- 2x Second-team All-Pac-12 (2018, 2019)

Career NFL statistics as of 2025
- Total tackles: 254
- Sacks: 2.0
- Forced fumbles: 3
- Fumble recoveries: 1
- Pass deflections: 17
- Interceptions: 4
- Stats at Pro Football Reference

Myles Bryant (born January 2, 1998) is an American professional football defensive back for the Detroit Lions of the National Football League (NFL). He played college football for the Washington Huskies and was signed by the New England Patriots as an undrafted free agent following the 2020 NFL draft.

== College career ==
Bryant played college football at Washington, where he was a three-time All-Pac-12 selection—twice on the second-team, and once as an honorable mention. He appeared in a total of 39 games, recording 177 tackles, 4 interceptions, 3 forced fumbles, and 3.5 sacks.

== Professional career ==
Pre-draft measurables
Height	Weight	Arm length	Hand span	Wingspan	40-yard dash	10-yard split	20-yard split	20-yard shuttle	Three-cone drill	Vertical jump	Broad jump
5 ft 7 7/8 in (1.72 m)	183 lb (83 kg)	29 1/2 in (0.75 m)	9 1/8 in (0.23 m)	5 ft 9 1/2 in (1.77 m)	4.62 s	1.63 s	2.70 s	4.02 s	6.81 s	31.5 in (0.80 m)	9 ft 7 in (2.92 m)
All values from NFL Combine

=== New England Patriots ===
Bryant went undrafted in the 2020 NFL draft, and signed with the New England Patriots on May 5, 2020. He was waived during final roster cuts on September 5, and re-signed to the team's practice squad the next day. He was promoted to the active roster on September 16, made his NFL debut in Week 8 against the Buffalo Bills, recorded his first tackle two weeks later in a win against the Baltimore Ravens, and recorded his first interception in week 14 against the Los Angeles Rams.

On August 31, 2021, Bryant was waived by the Patriots and re-signed to the team's practice squad. He was promoted to the active roster on October 19. In the Patriots' 54–13 rout of the New York Jets, Bryant recorded his first sack and first forced fumble.

=== Houston Texans ===
On April 2, 2024, Bryant signed with the Houston Texans. He was promoted to the active roster on November 28.

On May 21, 2025, Bryant re-signed with the Texans. He was released on August 26 as part of final roster cuts, and re-signed to the practice squad. On November 12, Bryant was signed to the active roster.

=== Cleveland Browns ===
On April 6, 2026, Bryant signed with the Cleveland Browns. On August 30, he was released by Cleveland as a part of final roster cuts; he was re-signed to the team's practice squad the following day. Bryant was released by Detroit on September 23 and re-signed to the practice squad five days later. On October 13, Bryant was released.

=== Detroit Lions ===
On October 22, 2026, Bryant signed with the Detroit Lions practice squad.

== NFL career statistics ==
Legend
	Won the Super Bowl
	Led the league
**Bold**	Career high

=== Regular season ===
Year	Team	Games		Tackles				Interceptions						Fumbles		
Year	Team	GP	GS	Cmb	Solo	Ast	Sck	Int	Yds	Avg	Lng	TD	PD	FF	FR	Yds
2020	NE	9	0	12	9	3	0.0	**1**	0	0	0	0	1	0	0	0
2021	NE	12	2	41	28	13	**1.0**	1	**33**	**33.0**	**33**	0	3	1	0	0
2022	NE	**17**	6	70	45	**25**	0.0	1	11	11.0	11	0	6	0	0	0
2023	NE	**17**	**9**	**77**	**65**	12	**1.0**	1	6	6.0	6	0	**7**	**2**	**1**	0
2024	HOU	11	0	14	11	3	0.0	0	0	0.0	0	0	0	0	0	0
2025	HOU	11	3	40	22	18	0.0	0	0	0.0	0	0	0	0	0	0
Career		77	20	254	180	74	2.0	4	44	14.7	33	0	17	3	1	0

=== Postseason ===
Year	Team	Games		Tackles				Interceptions						Fumbles		
Year	Team	GP	GS	Cmb	Solo	Ast	Sck	Int	Yds	Avg	Lng	TD	PD	FF	FR	Yds
2021	NE	1	**1**	2	2	0	0.0	0	0	0.0	0	0	2	0	0	0
2024	HOU	**2**	**1**	**7**	**4**	**3**	0.0	0	0	0.0	0	0	**3**	0	0	0
2025	HOU	**2**	0	1	1	0	0.0	0	0	0.0	0	0	0	0	0	0
Career		5	2	10	7	3	0.0	0	0	0.0	0	0	5	0	0	0
