= Łęki =

Łęki may refer to:

- Łęki, Brzesko County in Lesser Poland Voivodeship (south Poland)
- Łęki, Myślenice County in Lesser Poland Voivodeship (south Poland)
- Łęki, Łódź Voivodeship (central Poland)
- Łęki, Nowy Sącz County in Lesser Poland Voivodeship (south Poland)
- Łęki, Oświęcim County in Lesser Poland Voivodeship (south Poland)
- Łęki, Ciechanów County in Masovian Voivodeship (east-central Poland)
- Łęki, Siedlce County in Masovian Voivodeship (east-central Poland)

== See also ==
- Leki (disambiguation)
