= Troy Dye =

American football player (born 1996)

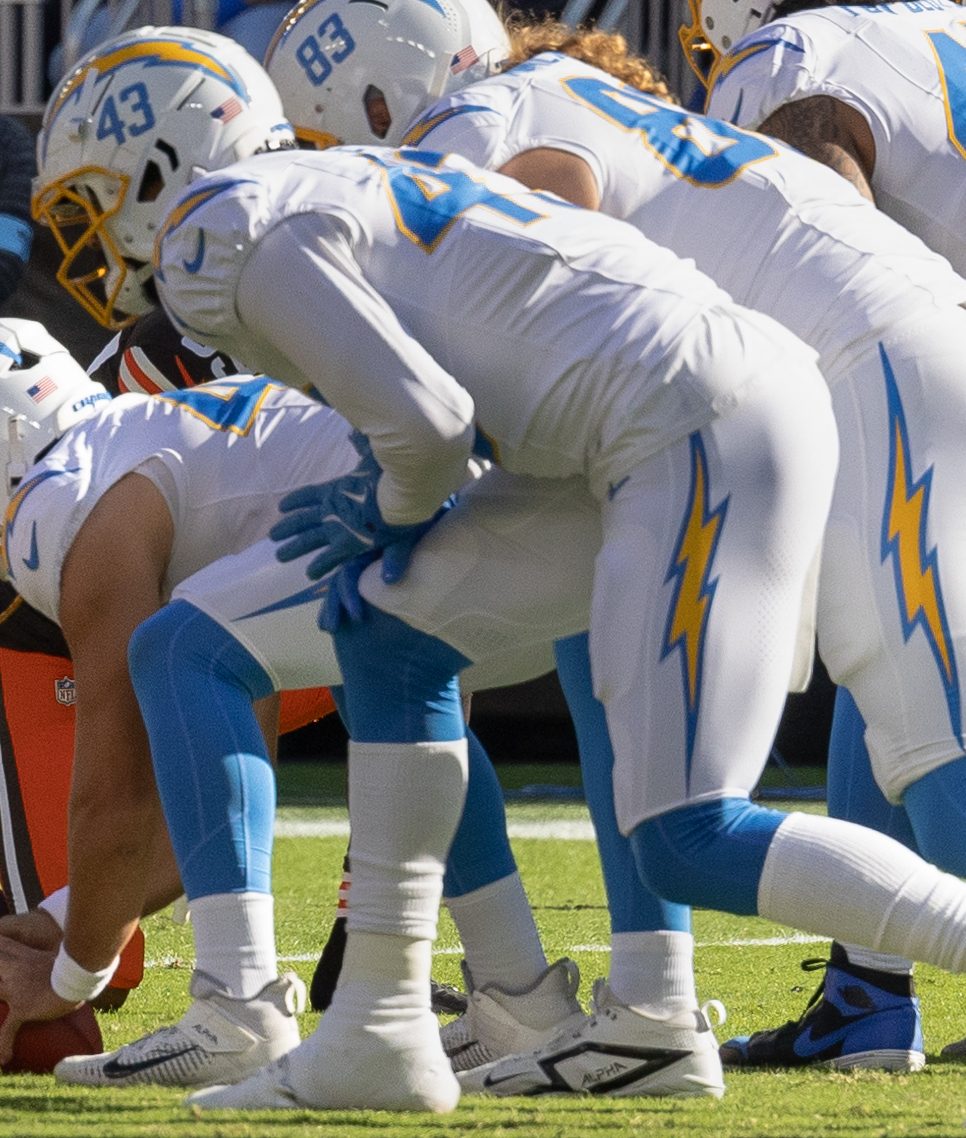
- Dye with the Los Angeles Chargers in 2024

No. 43 – Los Angeles Chargers
- Position: Linebacker
- Roster status: Active

Personal information
- Born: September 18, 1996 (age 30); Norco, California, U.S.
- Listed height: 6 ft 3 in (1.91 m)
- Listed weight: 225 lb (102 kg)

Career information
- High school: Norco
- College: Oregon (2016–2019)
- NFL draft: 2020: 4th round, 132nd overall pick

Career history
- Minnesota Vikings (2020–2023); Los Angeles Chargers (2024–present)

Awards and highlights
- 3× Second-team All-Pac-12 (2017–2019)

Career NFL statistics as of Week 5, 2026
- Total tackles: 214
- Sacks: 5.0
- Forced fumbles: 3
- Fumble recoveries: 2
- Pass deflections: 7
- Stats at Pro Football Reference

Troy Dye (born September 18, 1996) is an American professional football linebacker for the Los Angeles Chargers of the National Football League (NFL). He played college football for the Oregon Ducks and was selected by the Minnesota Vikings in the fourth round of the 2020 NFL draft.

== Early life ==
Dye attended Norco High School in Norco, California where he would play safety. By his senior year he had 105 tackles and four interceptions. He committed to the University of Oregon to play college football.

== College career ==
Dye was a four-year starter at Oregon. As a freshman in 2016 he started nine of 11 games, finishing with a team-high 92 tackles, 6.5 sacks and one interception. As a sophomore in 2017, he started all 13 games and again led the team in tackles with 107 and had four sacks and one interception. He led the team in tackles for a third straight year his junior year in 2018 with 115 and added two sacks and an interception over 13 starts. Dye returned for his senior year in 2019, rather than enter the 2019 NFL draft.

== Professional career ==
Pre-draft measurables
Height	Weight	Arm length	Hand span	Wingspan
6 ft 3 1/4 in (1.91 m)	231 lb (105 kg)	32 1/4 in (0.82 m)	9 3/8 in (0.24 m)	6 ft 6 in (1.98 m)
All values from NFL Combine

=== Minnesota Vikings ===
Dye was selected by the Minnesota Vikings in the fourth round (132nd overall) of the 2020 NFL draft. He was placed on injured reserve on September 24, 2020. He was activated on October 31, 2020.

=== Los Angeles Chargers ===
On March 18, 2024, Dye signed with the Los Angeles Chargers. He played in 17 games with five starts, recording 57 tackles and 1.5 sacks.

On March 13, 2025, Dye signed a two-year, $5.5 million contract extension with the Chargers.

== NFL career statistics ==
Legend
**Bold**	Career high

=== Regular season ===
Year	Team	Games		Tackles					Interceptions						Fumbles				
Year	Team	GP	GS	Cmb	Solo	Ast	Sck	TFL	Int	Yds	Avg	Lng	TD	PD	FF	Fum	FR	Yds	TD
2020	MIN	11	5	28	13	15	0.0	0	0	0	0.0	0	0	2	0	0	0	0	0
2021	MIN	**17**	1	20	12	8	0.0	0	0	0	0.0	0	0	0	0	0	0	0	0
2022	MIN	**17**	0	15	8	7	0.0	0	0	0	0.0	0	0	0	0	**1**	0	0	0
2023	MIN	15	2	17	11	6	1.0	1	0	0	0.0	0	0	0	**1**	0	0	0	0
2024	LAC	**17**	5	57	**34**	23	**1.5**	2	0	0	0.0	0	0	0	0	0	0	0	0
2025	LAC	16	**7**	**58**	28	**30**	1.0	**5**	0	0	0.0	0	0	**4**	**1**	**1**	0	0	0
2026	LAC	5	1	19	12	7	**1.5**	2	0	0	0.0	0	0	1	1	0	0	0	0
Career		98	21	214	118	96	5.0	10	0	0	0.0	0	0	7	3	2	0	0	0

=== Postseason ===
Year	Team	Games		Tackles					Interceptions						Fumbles				
Year	Team	GP	GS	Cmb	Solo	Ast	Sck	TFL	Int	Yds	Avg	Lng	TD	PD	FF	Fum	FR	Yds	TD
2022	MIN	**1**	0	0	0	0	0.0	0	0	0	0.0	0	0	0	0	0	0	0	0
2024	LAC	**1**	0	**8**	**6**	**2**	0.0	0	0	0	0.0	0	0	**1**	0	0	0	0	0
2025	LAC	**1**	0	2	1	1	0.0	0	0	0	0.0	0	0	0	0	0	0	0	0
Career		3	0	10	7	3	0.0	0	0	0	0.0	0	0	1	0	0	0	0	0

== Personal life ==
His brother, Travis Dye, played running back at Oregon and USC. His brother, Tony Dye, played free safety for the Cincinnati Bengals, for coach Mike Zimmer, Troy's former coach in Minnesota.

He is recently engaged to his fiancee, Brenda Wang.
