= Casey Toohill =

American football player (born 1996)

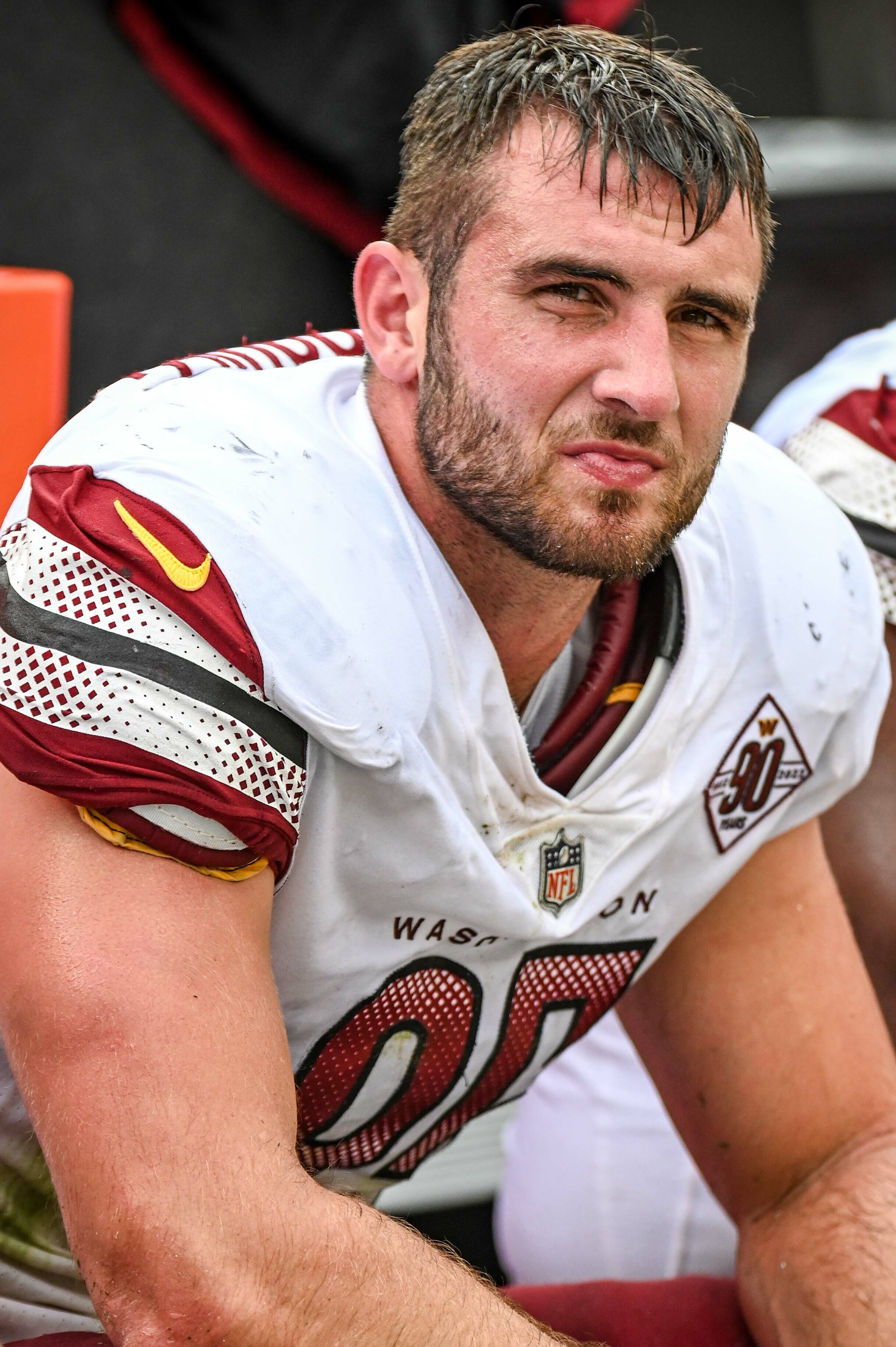
- Toohill with the Washington Commanders in 2022

No. 56, 95, 99
- Position: Defensive end

Personal information
- Born: August 22, 1996 (age 30); San Diego, California, U.S.
- Listed height: 6 ft 5 in (1.96 m)
- Listed weight: 254 lb (115 kg)

Career information
- High school: Cathedral Catholic (San Diego)
- College: Stanford (2015–2019)
- NFL draft: 2020: 7th round, 233rd overall pick

Career history
- Philadelphia Eagles (2020); Washington Football Team / Commanders (2020–2023); Buffalo Bills (2024); Houston Texans (2025)*
- * Offseason or practice squad member only

Awards and highlights
- Second-team All-Pac-12 (2019)

Career NFL statistics as of 2024
- Total tackles: 100
- Sacks: 8
- Pass deflections: 3
- Fumble recoveries: 4
- Defensive touchdowns: 1
- Stats at Pro Football Reference

Casey Joseph Toohill (born August 22, 1996) is an American former professional football defensive end. He played college football for the Stanford Cardinal and was selected by the Philadelphia Eagles in the seventh round of the 2020 NFL draft. Toohill also played for the Washington Commanders and Buffalo Bills.

== College career ==
A three-star recruit, Toohill committed to Stanford to play football over multiple offers from schools such as Boston College, Nevada, Utah, Washington, and Washington State. Toohill started all 12 games as a fifth-year senior at Stanford. He earned second-team All-Pac-12 honors after recording 11.5 tackles for loss, eight sacks, and 60 tackles. In his career, he recorded 124 tackles (21.5 for loss), 14 sacks, and an interception.

== Professional career ==
Pre-draft measurables
Height	Weight	Arm length	Hand span	40-yard dash	10-yard split	20-yard split	20-yard shuttle	Three-cone drill	Vertical jump	Broad jump	Bench press	Wonderlic
6 ft 4 3/8 in (1.94 m)	250 lb (113 kg)	33 1/2 in (0.85 m)	9 1/2 in (0.24 m)	4.62 s	1.54 s	2.70 s	4.21 s	7.08 s	39.0 in (0.99 m)	10 ft 6 in (3.20 m)	17 reps	30
All values from NFL Combine

=== Philadelphia Eagles ===
Toohill was selected by the Philadelphia Eagles in the seventh round, 233rd overall, of the 2020 NFL draft. He was waived by the Eagles on October 13, 2020.

=== Washington Football Team / Commanders ===
On October 14, 2020, Toohill was claimed off waivers by the Washington Football Team.

In Week 6 of the 2021 season, Toohill recorded his first career sack on Kansas City Chiefs quarterback Patrick Mahomes. He had his first career start in Week 11 against the Carolina Panthers in place of Chase Young, who was placed on the team's injured reserve. On December 11, 2021, he was placed on COVID-19 reserve list; Toohill was forced to sit out the Week 14 game against the Dallas Cowboys, but reactivated a week later.

In Week 10 of the 2022 season, Toohill scored his first career touchdown in a victory over the then-undefeated Philadelphia Eagles; he recovered the ball in a failed lateral pass from Eagles' receiver DeVonta Smith and returned it 1 yard to the end zone in the final play of the game.

In the 2023 season, Toohill was elevated in the defense's starting lineup before Week 9; following Week 8, the Commanders had traded both of their original starting defensive ends, Chase Young and Montez Sweat.

=== Buffalo Bills ===
On March 19, 2024, Toohill signed a one-year contract with the Buffalo Bills. He played in 13 games for Buffalo, logging one pass deflection, one sack, and 14 total tackles. Toohill was released by the Bills on December 17. Two days later, Buffalo re–signed Toohill to their practice squad.

=== Houston Texans ===
On March 14, 2025, Toohill signed with the Houston Texans. He was released on August 26 as part of final roster cuts.

Toohill announced his retirement from professional football on September 12, 2026.
