= Nick Harris (offensive lineman) =

American football player (born 1998)

Profile
- Position: Center

Personal information
- Born: November 13, 1998 (age 27); Santa Ana, California, U.S.
- Listed height: 6 ft 1 in (1.85 m)
- Listed weight: 302 lb (137 kg)

Career information
- High school: JSerra Catholic (San Juan Capistrano, California)
- College: Washington (2016–2019)
- NFL draft: 2020: 5th round, 160th overall pick

Career history
- Cleveland Browns (2020–2023); Seattle Seahawks (2024)*; Cleveland Browns (2024); Washington Commanders (2025)*
- * Offseason or practice squad member only

Awards and highlights
- 2× first-team All-Pac-12 (2018, 2019)

Career NFL statistics as of 2025
- Games played: 45
- Games started: 6
- Stats at Pro Football Reference

Nick Harris (born November 13, 1998) is an American professional football center. He played college football for the Washington Huskies and was selected by the Cleveland Browns in the fifth round of the 2020 NFL draft. Harris has also played for the Seattle Seahawks and Washington Commanders.

== College career ==
Washington was the only Football Bowl Subdivision school to offer Harris a scholarship, and he committed on July 30, 2015, although Harris did receive offers from Football Championship Subdivision teams New Hampshire and Cal Poly. He landed at Washington with JSerra Catholic High School offensive line teammate Luke Wattenberg.

Harris earned a starting spot for part of his true freshman season and held it throughout his career at Washington. He played guard for his first two seasons, but switched to center before his junior season. He missed one game due to injury during his sophomore season and was named honorable mention all-Pac-12 Conference his sophomore year, but was named first-team all-conference his junior and senior years at center.

Before his senior season, Harris was named preseason all-Pac-12 and second-team preseason All-American, and was also named to the preseason watchlists for the Wuerffel Trophy, Outland Trophy, and Rimington Trophy.

After his senior season, Harris played in the 2020 Senior Bowl.

== Professional career ==
Pre-draft measurables
Height	Weight	Arm length	Hand span	40-yard dash	10-yard split	20-yard split	Vertical jump	Broad jump	Bench press
6 ft 0 7/8 in (1.85 m)	302 lb (137 kg)	32 1/8 in (0.82 m)	9 3/4 in (0.25 m)	5.10 s	1.76 s	2.95 s	29.5 in (0.75 m)	8 ft 7 in (2.62 m)	20 reps
All values from NFL Combine

=== Cleveland Browns (first stint) ===
Harris was drafted by the Cleveland Browns in the fifth round with the 160th overall pick of the 2020 NFL draft. Harris signed his rookie contract on May 22, 2020. On January 6, 2021, Harris was placed on injured reserve with a knee injury.

On October 5, 2021, Harris was placed on injured reserve with a hamstring injury. He was activated on November 6.

Harris was placed on injured reserve on August 16, 2022 after sustaining a knee injury during the second play of the Browns' preseason game against the Jacksonville Jaguars.

Harris backed up Ethan Pocic to start the 2023 season, and was moved to fullback later in the season.

=== Seattle Seahawks ===
On March 13, 2024, Harris signed with the Seattle Seahawks.

=== Cleveland Browns (second stint) ===
On August 11, 2024, Harris, along with a seventh round pick in 2026, was traded back to the Browns in exchange for a 2026 sixth round pick.

=== Washington Commanders ===
Harris signed with the Washington Commanders on August 21, 2025. Harris was released by the Commanders during final roster cuts on August 25.
