= Shane Lemieux =

American football player (born 1997)

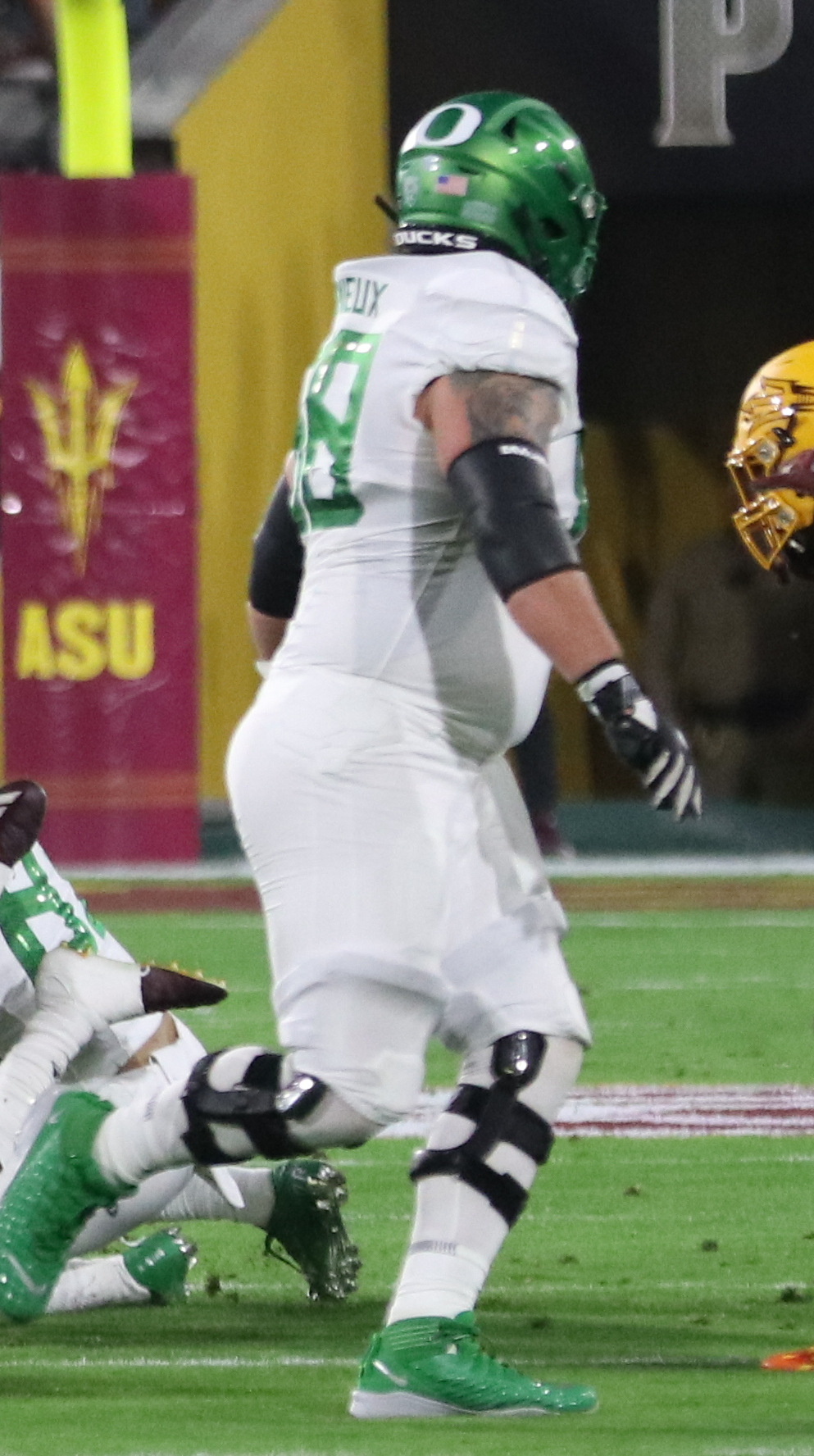
- Lemieux with the Oregon Ducks in 2019

No. 66
- Position: Offensive guard

Personal information
- Born: May 12, 1997 (age 29); Yakima, Washington, U.S.
- Listed height: 6 ft 4 in (1.93 m)
- Listed weight: 306 lb (139 kg)

Career information
- High school: West Valley (Yakima)
- College: Oregon (2015–2019)
- NFL draft: 2020: 5th round, 150th overall pick

Career history
- New York Giants (2020–2023); New Orleans Saints (2024); Seattle Seahawks (2025)*
- * Offseason or practice squad member only

Awards and highlights
- Super Bowl champion (LX); First-team All-American (2019); 2× Second-team All-Pac-12 (2018, 2019)

Career NFL statistics
- Games played: 25
- Games started: 16
- Stats at Pro Football Reference

Shane Lemieux (born May 12, 1997) is an American former professional football player who was a guard in the National Football League (NFL). He played college football for the Oregon Ducks, and was selected by the New York Giants in the fifth round of the 2020 NFL draft.

== Early life ==
Lemieux played at West Valley High School as a tight end and offensive lineman. He was ranked as the 36th best offensive tackle prospect, and received offers from over half of the Pac-12. A 3-star recruit, Lemieux committed to Oregon on May 3, 2014, choosing the Ducks over offers from Boise State, Michigan, NC State, and South Carolina, among others.

== College career ==
While Lemieux redshirted his freshman season, he did not miss a start between 2016 and 2019, starting 52 games over those four seasons.

After his junior season, Lemieux and a group of teammates (including quarterback Justin Herbert) considered leaving for the NFL Draft, but collectively decided to stay. Lemieux had also sought out an evaluation from the NFL's College Advisory Board and was advised to return to school.

After his senior season, Lemieux was named a second-team All-American by both the Associated Press and Sporting News, and was named first-team all-Pac-12.

== Professional career ==
Pre-draft measurables
Height	Weight	Arm length	Hand span	Wingspan	40-yard dash	10-yard split	20-yard split	20-yard shuttle	Three-cone drill	Vertical jump	Broad jump	Bench press
6 ft 3 7/8 in (1.93 m)	310 lb (141 kg)	32 1/4 in (0.82 m)	9 1/2 in (0.24 m)	6 ft 5 in (1.96 m)	5.11 s	1.83 s	2.99 s	4.90 s	8.13 s	25.5 in (0.65 m)	8 ft 11 in (2.72 m)	26 reps
All values from NFL Combine/Pro Day

=== New York Giants ===
Lemieux was selected by the New York Giants in the fifth round with the 150th overall pick in the 2020 NFL draft. On Monday Night Football on November 2, he started his first game at left guard for Will Hernandez who tested positive for COVID-19. Lemieux retained the starting position for the remainder of the season, replacing Hernandez at left guard. He finished his rookie season playing in 12 games with 9 starts, allowing 25 pressures and five sacks.

On September 16, 2021, Lemieux was placed on injured reserve after aggravating a knee injury in Week 1. On September 22, Lemieux underwent season-ending surgery to repair his left knee's patella tendon. Lemieux was the second Giants offensive lineman announced out for the season, following Nick Gates' injury in Week 2's Thursday Night Football.

On August 11, 2022, Lemieux injured his toe in the first week of the preseason against the New England Patriots. He was placed on injured reserve on August 31. On November 19, he was activated from injured reserve. Lemieux was placed on season–ending injured reserve on December 28 after aggravating his toe injury in Week 11 against the Detroit Lions. He finished the season playing in 39 offensive snaps, allowing five pressures and a sack.

On October 19, 2023, the Giants placed Lemieux on injured reserve for the third consecutive season after tearing his biceps in practice. He finished the season playing in 27 snaps and allowed just one pressure.

=== New Orleans Saints ===
On April 29, 2024, Lemieux signed with the New Orleans Saints. He was released by the Saints on August 27 as part of final roster cuts and re-signed to the practice squad the following day. Lemieux was promoted to the active roster on September 25.

On August 1, 2025, Lemieux re-signed with the Saints. He was released on August 26 as part of final roster cuts.

=== Seattle Seahawks ===
On September 18, 2025, Lemieux signed with the Seattle Seahawks' practice squad.

On April 22, 2026, Lemieux announced his retirement from the NFL due to major injuries sustained during his career.
