= Blake Brandel =

American football player (born 1997)

No. 64 – Minnesota Vikings
- Position: Center
- Roster status: Active

Personal information
- Born: January 23, 1997 (age 29); Milwaukie, Oregon, U.S.
- Listed height: 6 ft 6 in (1.98 m)
- Listed weight: 315 lb (143 kg)

Career information
- High school: Central Catholic (Portland, Oregon)
- College: Oregon State (2015–2019)
- NFL draft: 2020: 6th round, 203rd overall pick

Career history
- Minnesota Vikings (2020–present)

Awards and highlights
- Second-team All-Pac-12 (2019)

Career NFL statistics as of Week 10, 2026
- Games played: 82
- Games started: 40
- Fumble recoveries: 1
- Stats at Pro Football Reference

Blake Brandel (born January 23, 1997) is an American professional football center for the Minnesota Vikings of the National Football League (NFL). He played college football for the Oregon State Beavers and was drafted by the Vikings in the sixth round of the 2020 NFL draft.

== College career ==
A 3-star recruit, Brandel committed to Oregon State over offers from Colorado, Nevada, and Washington State. He made 48 consecutive starts for the Beavers between 2016 and 2019. He was a Second-team All-Pac-12 Conference honoree in 2019. Brandel was also a three-time all-academic team selection.

== Professional career ==
Pre-draft measurables
Height	Weight	Arm length	Hand span	Wingspan	40-yard dash	10-yard split	20-yard split	20-yard shuttle	Three-cone drill	Vertical jump	Broad jump	Bench press
6 ft 6 3/8 in (1.99 m)	308 lb (140 kg)	33 1/4 in (0.84 m)	10 1/2 in (0.27 m)	6 ft 8 5/8 in (2.05 m)	5.31 s	1.85 s	3.00 s	4.96 s	7.97 s	31.0 in (0.79 m)	9 ft 1 in (2.77 m)	29 reps
All values from Pro Day

Brandel was selected by the Minnesota Vikings with the 203rd overall pick in the sixth round of the 2020 NFL draft. He was placed on the reserve/COVID-19 list by the Vikings on July 27, 2020, and activated four days later. Brandel was waived by the Vikings during final roster cuts on September 5, 2020, and was signed to the practice squad the next day. He signed a reserve/future contract with the Vikings on January 4, 2021.

On September 25, 2021, Brandel was waived by the Vikings and re-signed to the practice squad. He was promoted to the active roster on October 18, 2021.

Brandel was named a backup tackle to start the 2022 season. He started three games at left tackle in place of an injured Christian Darrisaw. He was placed on injured reserve on December 14, 2022. He was activated on January 14, 2023.

On March 11, 2024, Brandel signed a three-year contract extension with the Vikings.

== Personal life ==
He is married to Natalie Stone.
