= Cohl Cabral =

American football player (born 1998)

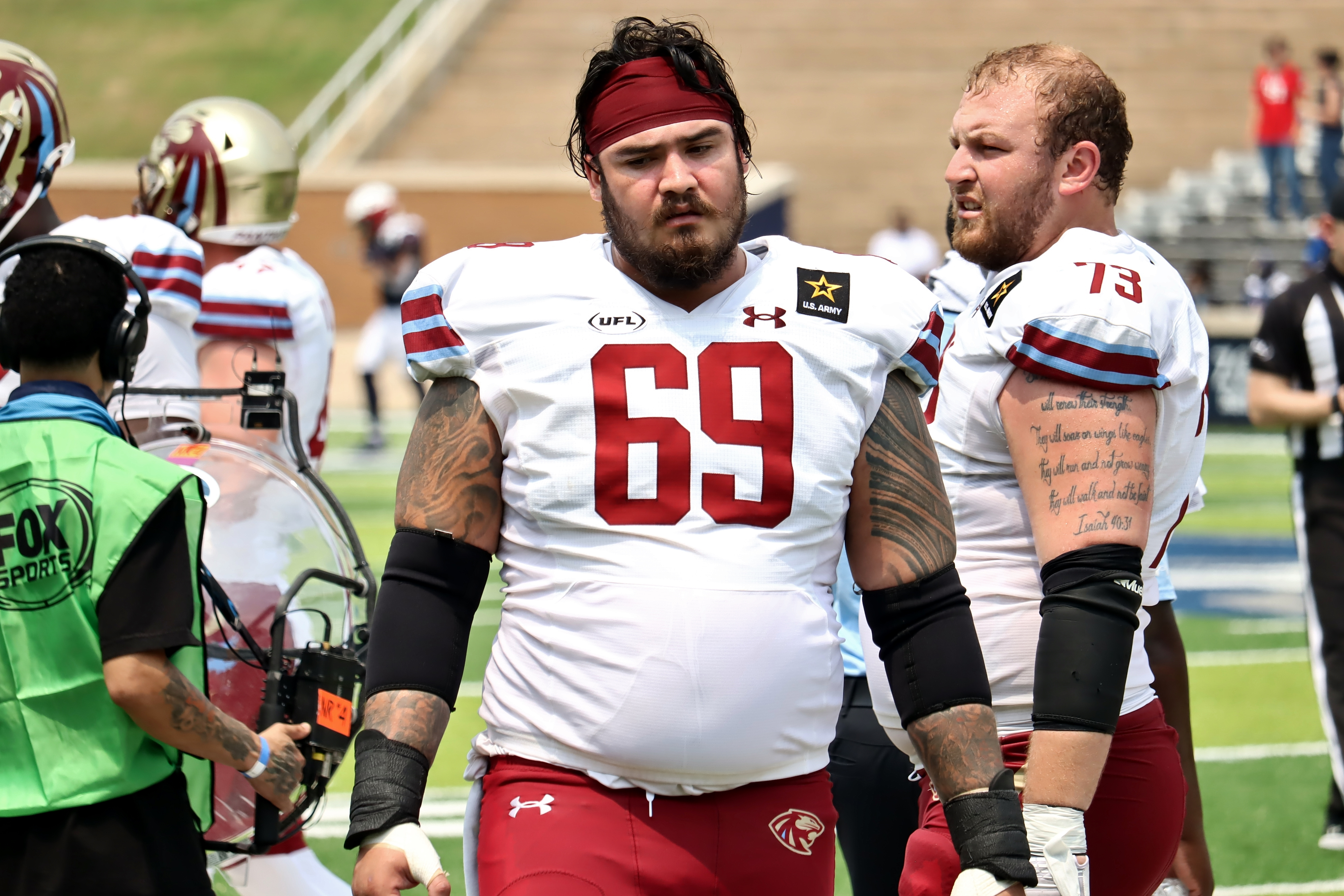
- Cabral in 2024

Profile
- Position: Center

Personal information
- Born: February 11, 1998 (age 28); Rancho Cucamonga, California, U.S.
- Listed height: 6 ft 5 in (1.96 m)
- Listed weight: 305 lb (138 kg)

Career information
- High school: Los Osos (Rancho Cucamonga, California)
- College: Arizona State (2016–2019)
- NFL draft: 2020: undrafted

Career history
- Los Angeles Rams (2020)*; Houston Texans (2020)*; Minnesota Vikings (2021)*; New Orleans Saints (2021)*; Birmingham Stallions (2023); Arizona Cardinals (2023)*; Birmingham Stallions (2024)*; Michigan Panthers (2024); Dallas Cowboys (2024)*; Michigan Panthers (2025); Columbus Aviators (2026)
- * Offseason or practice squad member only

Awards and highlights
- USFL champion (2023); All-UFL Team (2025); 2× Second-team All-Pac-12 (2018, 2019)
- Stats at Pro Football Reference

Cohl Cabral (born February 11, 1998) is an American professional football center. He played college football for the Arizona State Sun Devils.

== Early life ==
Cabral attended Los Osos high school in Rancho Cucamonga, California. He played center and offensive tackle on the football team. He was selected to play in the Under Armour All-America Game as a senior.

He also was ranked the no. 2 best center in the nation by ESPN, and ranked 199 on the ESPN 300. He would commit to Arizona State.

== College career ==
Cabral played in 11 games as a freshman for Arizona State in 2016.

He started all 13 games at left tackle in his sophomore year, helping Demario Richard reach 1000 yards rushing.

He started all 13 games as center in his junior year, and was selected to the All-Pac-12 second team. He also won the team captain award.

Cabral was voted as team captain for second time in his senior year, and again started all 13 games. He finished with another second team All-Pac-12 selection, and finished with the 14th best run blocking grade for FBS centers according to PFF. He also finished with only one sack, and 10 QB pressures allowed.

== Professional career ==
Pre-draft measurables
Height	Weight	Arm length	Hand span	Wingspan	Bench press
6 ft 4 7/8 in (1.95 m)	300 lb (136 kg)	32 1/4 in (0.82 m)	10 in (0.25 m)	6 ft 6 1/2 in (1.99 m)	20 reps
All values from NFL Combine

=== Los Angeles Rams ===
After going undrafted in the 2020 NFL Draft, Cabral signed with the Los Angeles Rams as an undrafted free agent. Cabral was waived on September 4, 2020. He was re-signed to the practice squad on September 6. He was released on November 10.

=== Houston Texans ===
Cabral was signed to the Houston Texans practice squad on November 21, 2020. He was signed to a reserve/futures contract on January 5, 2021. He was waived on May 21, 2021.

=== Minnesota Vikings ===
The Minnesota Vikings claimed Cabral off waivers from the Houston Texans on May 24, 2021. He was waived on August 28. Cabral was re-signed to the practice squad on November 6. He was again released on November 16.

=== New Orleans Saints ===
Cabral was signed to the New Orleans Saints practice squad on December 31, 2021. He signed a reserve/futures contract with the Saints on January 11, 2022. He was waived on May 16, 2022.

=== Birmingham Stallions ===
Cabral was signed by the Birmingham Stallions on September 17, 2022. He started in all 12 games for the Stallions, a season in which the team won the USFL Championship.

=== Arizona Cardinals ===
The Arizona Cardinals signed Cabral on August 25, 2023. He was cut on August 29.

=== Birmingham Stallions (second stint) ===
Cabral was re-signed by the Stallions on September 21, 2023. He was cut on March 22, 2024.

=== Michigan Panthers ===
On March 22, 2024 Cabral was claimed off waivers by the Michigan Panthers. Cabral was released on August 13, 2024.

=== Dallas Cowboys ===
Cabral was signed by the Dallas Cowboys on August 14, 2024. Cabral was released during final roster cuts.

=== Michigan Panthers (second stint) ===
Cabral was re-signed by the Michigan Panthers on November 1, 2024. Cabral was named to the All-UFL team for the season. Cabral was re-signed by the Panthers on July 8, 2025.

=== Columbus Aviators ===
On January 12, 2026, Cabral was allocated to the Columbus Aviators of the United Football League (UFL).
