= Laviska Shenault =

American football player (born 1998)

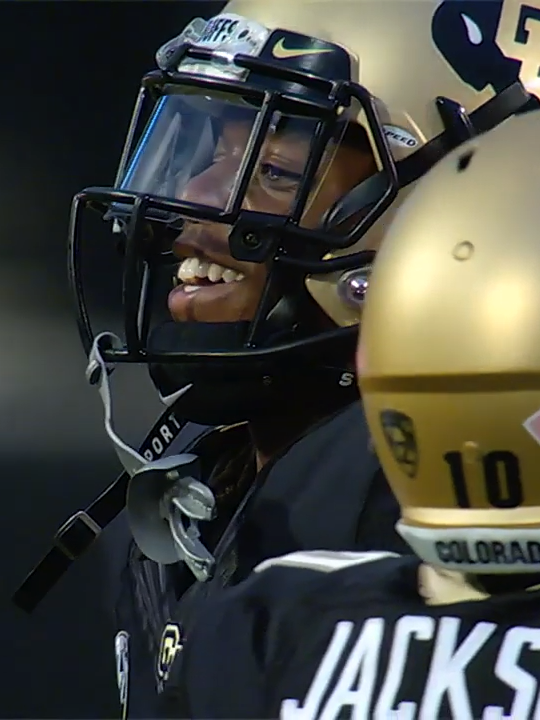
- Shenault with the Colorado Buffaloes in 2018

Profile
- Positions: Wide receiver, kickoff returner

Personal information
- Born: October 5, 1998 (age 28); Irving, Texas, U.S.
- Listed height: 6 ft 1 in (1.85 m)
- Listed weight: 224 lb (102 kg)

Career information
- High school: DeSoto (DeSoto, Texas)
- College: Colorado (2017–2019)
- NFL draft: 2020: 2nd round, 42nd overall pick

Career history
- Jacksonville Jaguars (2020–2021); Carolina Panthers (2022–2023); Seattle Seahawks (2024); Los Angeles Chargers (2024); Buffalo Bills (2025)*; Birmingham Stallions (2026)
- * Offseason or practice squad member only

Awards and highlights
- First-team All-Pac-12 (2018); Second-team All-Pac-12 (2019)

Career NFL statistics
- Receptions: 163
- Receiving yards: 1,587
- Receiving touchdowns: 6
- Rushing yards: 253
- Rushing touchdowns: 1
- Return yards: 708
- Return touchdowns: 1
- Stats at Pro Football Reference

Laviska Terrell Shenault Jr. (born October 5, 1998) is an American professional football wide receiver and kickoff returner. He played college football for the Colorado Buffaloes.

== Early life ==
Shenault attended DeSoto High School in DeSoto, Texas, where he played high school football. As a senior, he had 46 receptions for 825 yards and nine touchdowns. He committed to the University of Colorado Boulder to play college football. Shenault also played basketball as a freshman in high school, but quit rather than cut his trademark dreadlocks.

== College career ==
As a freshman at Colorado in 2017, Shenault played in 12 games, recording seven receptions for 168 yards. As a sophomore in 2018, he became a starter and recorded 11 receptions for 211 yards and an 89-yard touchdown in the first game of the season against Colorado State. Against Arizona State, he had 13 receptions for 127 yards with two receiving touchdowns and two rushing. He also caught the 40-yard game winning touchdown against Nebraska on September 18. He ended the season with 86 receptions (leading the NCAA in receptions per game, missing three with an injury; also the third most in a season in school history) for 1,011 yards (4th nationally, 9th best in school history) and six touchdowns, supplemented with 115 yards rushing for five touchdowns. His 2019 junior season was highlighted by returning from a knee injury to break four tackles on a crucial 4th down conversion to set up the game winning field goal over Stanford, and nine receptions for 172 yards a touchdown against USC. After totaling 764 yards and 6 touchdowns that year, Shenault decided to forgo his senior year and declare for the 2020 NFL draft. At the time, he was the 11th Buffalo all-time in receiving yards and 8th in receptions, he was also tied for 5th with over 100 yards receiving in eight of his 27 games.

== Professional career ==
Pre-draft measurables
Height	Weight	Arm length	Hand span	40-yard dash	10-yard split	20-yard split	Bench press	Wonderlic
6 ft 0 5/8 in (1.84 m)	227 lb (103 kg)	31 7/8 in (0.81 m)	9 in (0.23 m)	4.58 s	1.61 s	2.67 s	17 reps	14
All values from NFL Combine

=== Jacksonville Jaguars ===
Shenault was selected by the Jacksonville Jaguars in the second round of the 2020 NFL draft with the 42nd overall pick, the 9th of 35 wide receivers. In the first game of the 2020 season against the Indianapolis Colts, Shenault caught three passes for 37 yards and an 18-yard touchdown that tied the game at 14 late in the second quarter of the 27–20 victory. In the last game of the season, also against the Colts, he caught both of his teams touchdowns in a 14-28 loss. His 58 receptions for 600 yards (6th and 7th among rookies) was a rare positive for the 1-15 Jaguars.

His second season was highlighted by 110 scrimmage yards in a Week 4 loss to the Cincinnati Bengals. His 63 receptions for 619 yards were the most for a player with 0 touchdowns in 2021, and second on the team to Marvin Jones.

=== Carolina Panthers ===
Shenault was traded to the Carolina Panthers on August 29, 2022, in exchange for 2023 seventh-round and 2024 sixth-round picks. In his first game with the team, he caught a 67-yard touchdown from Baker Mayfield in a Week 3 victory over the New Orleans Saints. He finished the season with 27 catches for 272 yards and one touchdown.

Shenault entered the 2023 season fifth on the depth chart. He suffered an ankle injury in Week 12 and was placed on injured reserve on November 30, 2023.

=== Seattle Seahawks ===
On April 2, 2024, Shenault signed with the Seattle Seahawks. He had a few passing receptions but was primarily used for kick returns. Stats over 11 games included 459 yards on 16 returns and with one fumble, and 5 receptions for 36 yards. His best play was a 97 yard return for a touchdown in week 6 against the San Francisco 49ers.

In Week 13 against the Jets Shenault fumbled on a kick return four minutes into the second quarter that ended up being recovered by the Jets kicker Anders Carlson. The next day Shenault was waived by the Seahawks along with Dee Williams. Williams had also fumbled on a kick return in the first quarter of the same game.

=== Los Angeles Chargers ===
On December 5, 2024, Shenault was signed to the Los Angeles Chargers practice squad. He was listed as active for one game but recorded no stats. He was released on January 7, 2025.

=== Buffalo Bills ===
On March 13, 2025, Shenault signed with the Buffalo Bills. He was released on August 26 as part of final roster cuts.

=== Birmingham Stallions ===
On January 14, 2026, Shenault was selected by the Birmingham Stallions of the United Football League (UFL). He was released by the Stallions on May 2.

== Personal life ==
Shenault is the son of Annie Brown Shenault and Laviska Shenault Sr. His father was killed in July 2009, when Shenault was 10, after being struck by vehicles on a road in Irving, Texas, while the family was driving home. Shenault has grown his dreadlocks in tribute to his father. He wore the number 2 in tribute to his father, and he has been nicknamed "2 Live." The family later lost its home, and his mother contracted West Nile virus in 2012.

His younger brother, La'Vontae, joined Colorado as a wide receiver in 2019, and his cousin, Khari Harden, played college football at Auburn before transferring to Tulsa. In high school, Shenault volunteered to honor local veterans. At Colorado, he majored in film studies and ethnic studies, and his hobbies have included playing video games, Sudoku and pick-up basketball.
