= Calvin Throckmorton =

American football player (born 1996)

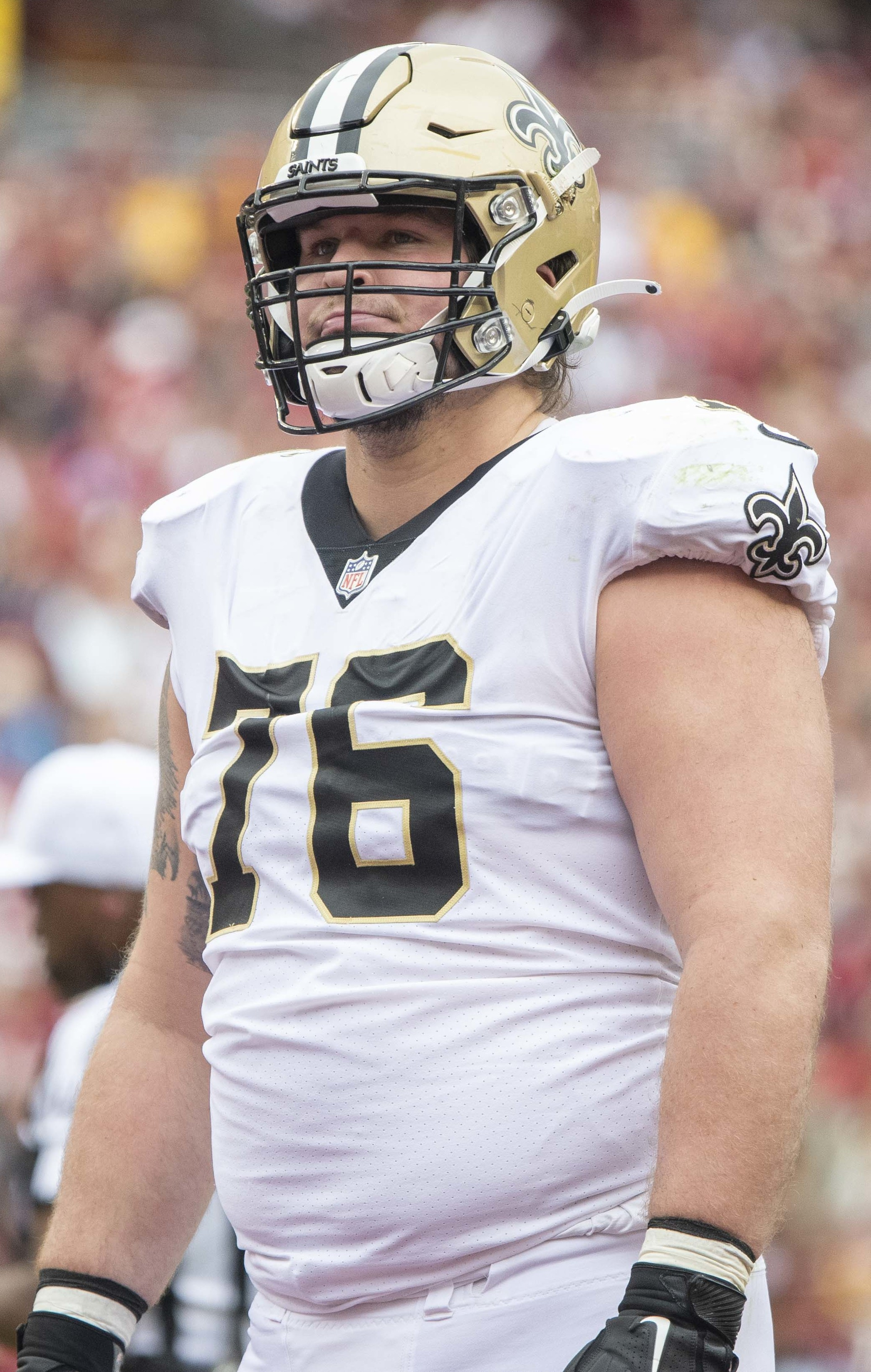
- Throckmorton with the New Orleans Saints in 2021

No. 76 – Denver Broncos
- Position: Guard
- Roster status: Practice squad

Personal information
- Born: August 16, 1996 (age 30); Bellevue, Washington, U.S.
- Listed height: 6 ft 5 in (1.96 m)
- Listed weight: 311 lb (141 kg)

Career information
- High school: Newport (Bellevue)
- College: Oregon (2015–2019)
- NFL draft: 2020: undrafted

Career history
- New Orleans Saints (2020–2022); Carolina Panthers (2023); Tennessee Titans (2023); Denver Broncos (2024–present)

Awards and highlights
- Third-team All-American (2019)

Career NFL statistics as of Week 18, 2025
- Games played: 58
- Games started: 27
- Stats at Pro Football Reference

Calvin Throckmorton (born August 16, 1996) is an American professional football guard for the Denver Broncos of the National Football League (NFL). He played college football for the Oregon Ducks, and was signed as an undrafted free agent by the New Orleans Saints in 2020. He has also played for the Tennessee Titans and Carolina Panthers.

== Early life ==
Throckmorton grew up in Bellevue, Washington and attended Newport High School, where he played both offensive and defensive line for the football team. He was rated a three-star prospect by Rivals, 247Sports, Scout, and ESPN and committed to play college football at the University of Oregon over offers from Arizona, Arizona State, Boise State, Michigan, and Miami.

== College career ==
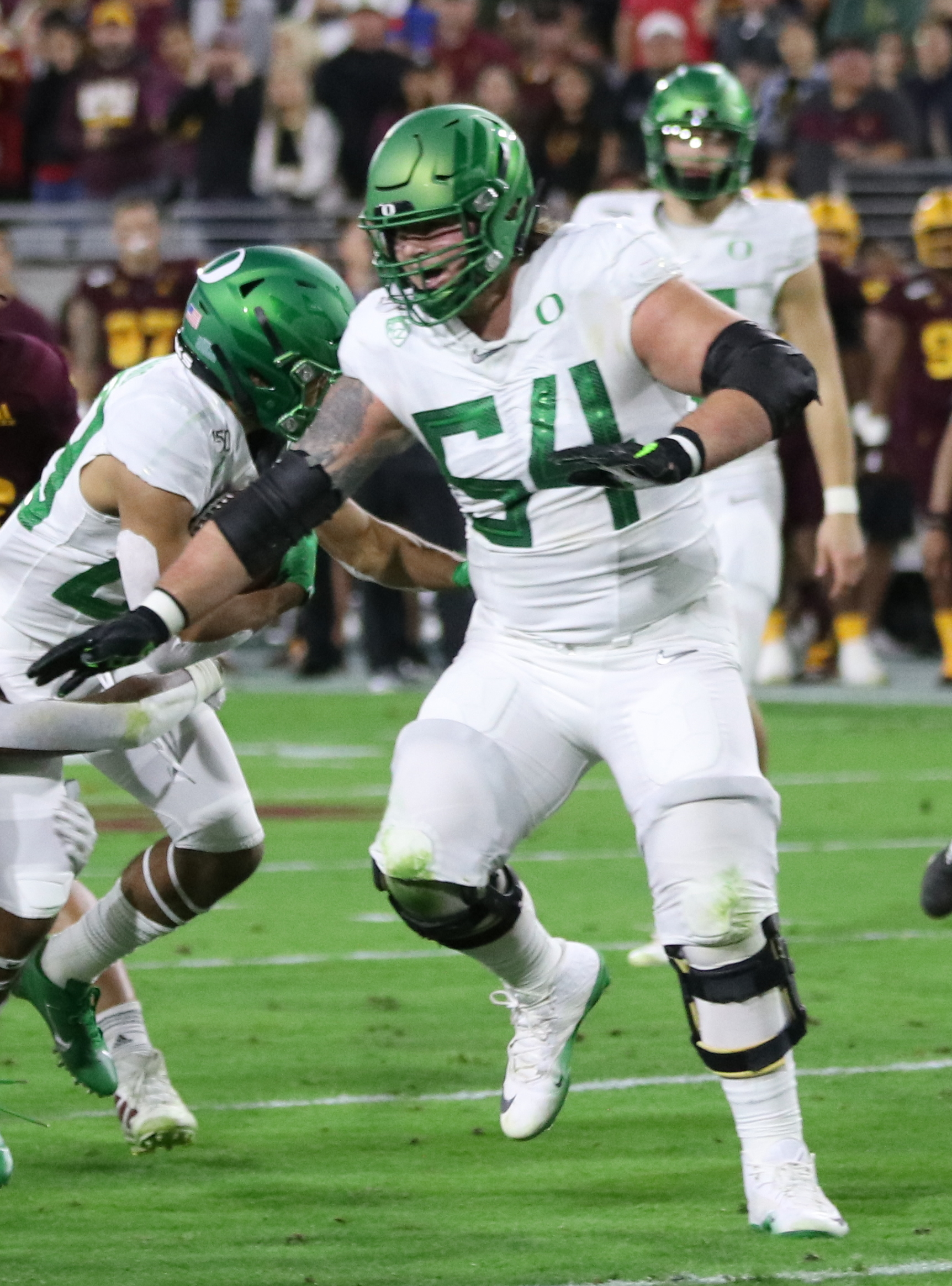
Throckmorton playing for Oregon in 2019

Throckmorton redshirted his true freshman season. He started all 12 of Oregon's games the following year and was named honorable mention All-Pac-12 Conference. He started the first ten games of his redshirt sophomore season at right tackle before moving to right guard for the final three games of the year and was again named honorable mention All-Pac-12. As a redshirt junior, Throckmorton was the only FBS player to make a start at four different offensive line positions (right tackle, left tackle, right guard and center) and also played snaps at left guard. He was graded the fourth-best offensive tackle in college football by Pro Football Focus (PFF) and was named a second-team All-American by the FWAA, Phil Steele, and PFF as well as first-team All-Pac-12 by the Associated Press (AP) and honorable mention All-conference by the league's coaches.

Throckmorton entered his redshirt senior season on the watchlist for the Outland Trophy and was named a preseason All-American by the AP and PFF. He was also named the fifth-best offensive line prospect for the 2020 NFL draft by USA Today. Throckmorton was named honorable mention All-Pac-12 and a third-team All-American by the AP, as well as a second-team Academic All-American, at the end of the season.

== Professional career ==
Pre-draft measurables
Height	Weight	Arm length	Hand span	Wingspan	40-yard dash	10-yard split	20-yard split	20-yard shuttle	Three-cone drill	Vertical jump	Broad jump	Bench press
6 ft 5 in (1.96 m)	317 lb (144 kg)	32 1/2 in (0.83 m)	9 1/2 in (0.24 m)	6 ft 5 7/8 in (1.98 m)	5.57 s	1.95 s	3.23 s	4.98 s	8.07 s	27.0 in (0.69 m)	8 ft 1 in (2.46 m)	23 reps
All values from NFL Combine

=== New Orleans Saints ===
Throckmorton signed with the New Orleans Saints as an undrafted free agent on April 27, 2020, shortly after the conclusion of the 2020 NFL draft. He was waived on September 5 and signed to the practice squad the following day. On January 18, 2021, Throckmorton signed a reserve/futures contract with the Saints. He made the Saints' 53-man roster out of training camp at the start of the 2021 season, and made his NFL debut in the Saints' season opener against the Green Bay Packers on September 12. In the game, Throckmorton replaced Cesar Ruiz at right guard, with Ruiz placed at center as Erik McCoy left in the first quarter due to a calf injury. He continued being the team's starting right guard for the next four games until Week 7. In Week 8, Throckmorton became the starting left guard after Andrus Peat was placed on injured reserve.

On February 22, 2023, Throckmorton re–signed with the Saints on a one–year contract. On August 29, Throckmorton was waived as part of final roster cuts.

=== Carolina Panthers ===
On August 30, 2023, Throckmorton was claimed off waivers by the Carolina Panthers. He was waived on November 14.

=== Tennessee Titans ===
On November 15, 2023, Throckmorton was claimed off waivers by the Tennessee Titans.

=== Denver Broncos ===
On April 1, 2024, Throckmorton signed with the Denver Broncos. On August 27, he was released by the Broncos and signed to the practice squad the following day. On November 1, he was promoted to the active roster to serve as the Broncos' backup center while Alex Forsyth filled in as the starter for an injured Luke Wattenberg. On November 26, he was waived and signed to the practice squad the following day.

Throckmorton signed a reserve/future contract with Denver on January 13, 2025. On August 26, Throckmorton was released by the Broncos as part of final roster cuts and signed to the practice squad the following day. On October 14, he was promoted to the active roster. On December 18, Throckmorton was waived and then re-signed to the practice squad. On December 25, Throckmorton was promoted to the active roster again. The following day, he was waived again and re-signed to the practice squad.

On January 26, 2026, Throckmorton would once again sign a reserve/future contract with the Broncos, remaining with the team. On August 30, Throckmorton was released by the Broncos as a part of final roster cuts; he was re-signed to the team's practice squad the next day.
