= Leki Maka =

New Zealand boxer

- Born: Sitaleki Maka; 6 December 1985 (age 40)
- Other names: Magic Man
- Nationality: New Zealander
- Weight: 139 lb (63 kg; 9 st 13 lb)
- Division: Super lightweight
- Style: Boxing
- Stance: Orthodox
- Trainer: Lolo Heimuli
- Years active: 2013–present

Professional boxing record
- Total: 10
- Wins: 9
- By knockout: 3
- Losses: 1
- By knockout: 0
- Draws: 0

Other information
- Boxing record from BoxRec
- Last updated on: 28 January 2017

Sitaleki Maka (born 6 December 1985) is a professional boxer.

Maka is currently the New Zealand Champion (NZNBF Version) in the Super Lightweight division. Maka fought the biggest fight in his career in China in December 2016 against Baishanbo Nasiyiwula for the interim WBA International super lightweight title. Maka suffered his first defeat in this bout by unanimous decision.

Maka biggest win in his career was against Farzan Ali Jr in Fiji in May 2016. Maka took the fight on late notice, due to Anthony Taylor who was the original opponent pulled out due to sickness. Maka won the bout when Ali Jr retired after the 2nd round.

== Professional boxing titles ==
- New Zealand National Boxing Federation
  - New Zealand National Super Lightweight Title (139Ibs)

== Professional boxing record ==
10 fights	9 wins	1 loss
By knockout	3	0
By decision	6	1
Draws	0	

No.	Result	Record	Opponent	Type	Round, time	Date	Location	Notes
10	Lose	9–1	(China) Baishanbo Nasiyiwula	UD	10	17 December 2016	Hangzhou, China	interim WBA International super lightweight title
9	Win	9–0	(Fiji) Farzan Ali Jr	RTD	2 (10) 3:00	21 May 2016	Nadi, Fiji	
8	Win	8–0	(New Zealand) Nick Hikuroa	RTD	2 (4) 3:00	5 March 2016	War Memorial Civic Centre, Thames, New Zealand	
7	Win	7–0	(Australia) Alex Ah Tong	UD	6	13 February 2016	ASB Stadium, Auckland, New Zealand	
6	Win	6–0	(New Zealand) Ian Charlton	UD	10	21 November 2015	City Boxing Gym, Auckland, New Zealand	vacant NZNBF super lightweight title
5	Win	5–0	(Samoa) Ivana Siau	UD	4	17 October 2014	ABA Stadium, Auckland, New Zealand	
4	Win	4–0	(New Zealand) Daniel Maxwell	KO	2 (4)	12 September 2014	TSB Stadium, New Plymouth, New Zealand	
3	Win	3–0	(New Zealand) Richard Campbell	UD	4	25 July 2014	City Boxing & Fitness, Auckland, New Zealand	
2	Win	2–0	(New Zealand) Jody Allen	UD	4	13 December 2013	YMCA Gymnasium, New Plymouth, New Zealand	
1	Win	1–0	(New Zealand) Torin Rophia	UD	4	18 October 2013	ASB Stadium, Auckland, New Zealand	Professional debut

== Controversy ==
In 2006, Maka was involved in a brawl incident which include teenagers at an Auckland park. Maka himself stated he was not involved in the brawl as he was in a parked car, tired from the gym earlier in the day. Maka was founded guilty on three charges of assault and was sentenced to 375 hours community service. Before being sentence, Maka was released on bail to represent Tonga in the Melbourne Commonwealth games, however due to the conviction he was denied entry to Australia.
