= Junior Farzan Ali =

Fijian boxer

Personal information
- Nickname: The Razor
- Nationality: (Fiji) Fijian
- Born: Junior Farzan Ali; 27 April 1980 (age 46) Nadi, Fiji
- Weight: Welterweight

Boxing career
- Stance: Orthodox

Boxing record
- Total fights: 32
- Wins: 28
- Win by KO: 19
- Losses: 7
- Draws: 2
- No contests: 0

Junior Farzan Ali (commonly known as The Razor Farzan) (born 27 April 1980) is a Fijian professional boxer. He is the current WBF Asia Pacific lightweight champion. With 25 wins for 32 fights, Farzan is regarded as Fiji's best pound for pound boxer. He is the younger brother of Fijian boxer Joy Ali.

== Early life ==
Farzan Ali was born in Nadi, Fiji. He had a brother Joy Ali. He used to sell razor blades and then he left selling razor blades and trained to become a boxer. Farzan is a Muslim. Farzan has a son named Ali.

== Boxing career ==
Farzan has won 25 wins for 32 fights. He held the WBF Asia Pacific lightweight champion title once.
