= Leki Fotu =

Tongan-American football player (born 1998)

No. 77 – Philadelphia Eagles
- Position: Nose tackle
- Roster status: Practice squad

Personal information
- Born: August 23, 1998 (age 28); Oakland, California, U.S.
- Listed height: 6 ft 5 in (1.96 m)
- Listed weight: 330 lb (150 kg)

Career information
- High school: Herriman (Herriman, Utah)
- College: Utah (2016–2019)
- NFL draft: 2020: 4th round, 114th overall pick

Career history
- Arizona Cardinals (2020–2023); New York Jets (2024); Las Vegas Raiders (2025); Houston Texans (2025); New York Giants (2026)*; Philadelphia Eagles (2026–present)*
- * Offseason or practice squad member only

Awards and highlights
- 2× First-team All-Pac 12 (2018, 2019)

Career NFL statistics as of 2025
- Total tackles: 103
- Sacks: 4.5
- Forced fumbles: 1
- Fumble recoveries: 1
- Pass deflections: 3
- Stats at Pro Football Reference

George "Leki" Fotu (born August 23, 1998) is an American professional football nose tackle for the Philadelphia Eagles of the National Football League (NFL). He played college football for the Utah Utes and was selected by the Arizona Cardinals in the fourth round of the 2020 NFL draft. He previously played for the New York Jets, Las Vegas Raiders, and Houston Texans

== Early life ==
Fotu played high school rugby and high school football at Herriman High School, playing defensive end and sporadic tight end. His team won the Utah 5A state championship his senior season. A 2-star defensive end recruit, Fotu committed to Utah on September 20, 2015, choosing the Utes over offers from BYU, Oklahoma State, and USC.

== College career ==
After his sophomore season, Utah coaches considered moving Fotu from defensive end to offensive tackle, but Fotu instead moved to defensive tackle and claimed the starting spot at that position. At the end of his junior season, Fotu was named first-team all-Pac-12 Conference.

Before his senior season, Fotu was named a preseason All-American by ESPN. During the season, after a game against Cal, Fotu was named Pac-12 Defensive Player of the Week after recording a 13-yard sack. He was named second-team midseason All-American by the Associated Press.

== Professional career ==
Pre-draft measurables
Height	Weight	Arm length	Hand span	Wingspan	40-yard dash	10-yard split	20-yard split	Bench press
6 ft 5 3/8 in (1.97 m)	330 lb (150 kg)	34 1/4 in (0.87 m)	10 5/8 in (0.27 m)	6 ft 6 7/8 in (2.00 m)	5.15 s	1.80 s	3.00 s	21 reps
All values from NFL Combine

=== Arizona Cardinals ===
Fotu was drafted by the Arizona Cardinals in the fourth round with the 114th overall pick of the 2020 NFL draft. He was placed on injured reserve with an ankle injury on November 14, 2020, and activated on December 5, 2020. In Week 15 against the Philadelphia Eagles, Fotu recorded his first career sack on fellow rookie Jalen Hurts during the 33–26 win.

Fotu entered the 2021 season as the backup nose tackle for the Cardinals. He played in 17 games with three starts, recording 19 tackles, three passes defensed, and a forced fumble.

=== New York Jets ===
On March 14, 2024, Fotu signed with the New York Jets. He was placed on injured reserve on August 27. He was activated on October 14, but placed on injured reserve again on October 31.

=== Las Vegas Raiders ===
On March 25, 2025, Fotu signed with the Las Vegas Raiders. He played in six games before being released on December 16.

=== Houston Texans ===
On December 23, 2025, the Houston Texans signed Fotu to their practice squad.

=== New York Giants ===
On April 29, 2026, the New York Giants signed Fotu to a one-year contract. He was released by the Giants on August 29.

=== Philadelphia Eagles ===
On November 17, 2026, Fotu signed with the Philadelphia Eagles practice squad.

== NFL career statistics ==
Legend
**Bold**	Career high

=== Regular season ===
Year	Team	Games		Tackles					Interceptions						Fumbles				
Year	Team	GP	GS	Cmb	Solo	Ast	Sck	TFL	Int	Yds	Avg	Lng	TD	PD	FF	Fum	FR	Yds	TD
2020	ARI	11	0	11	6	5	1.0	4	0	0	0.0	0	0	0	0	0	0	0	0
2021	ARI	**17**	3	19	8	11	0.0	2	0	0	0.0	0	0	**3**	**1**	0	0	0	0
2022	ARI	**17**	**9**	**31**	13	**18**	0.0	1	0	0	0.0	0	0	0	0	0	**1**	0	0
2023	ARI	11	**9**	28	**15**	13	**2.5**	**5**	0	0	0.0	0	0	0	0	0	0	0	0
2024	NYJ	2	1	3	1	2	0.0	0	0	0	0.0	0	0	0	0	0	0	0	0
2025	LV	6	4	8	3	5	1.0	3	0	0	0.0	0	0	0	0	0	0	0	0
2025	HOU	2	0	3	0	3	0.0	0	0	0	0.0	0	0	0	0	0	0	0	0
Career		66	26	103	46	57	4.5	15	0	0	0.0	0	0	3	1	0	1	0	0

=== Postseason ===
Year	Team	Games		Tackles					Interceptions						Fumbles				
Year	Team	GP	GS	Cmb	Solo	Ast	Sck	TFL	Int	Yds	Avg	Lng	TD	PD	FF	Fum	FR	Yds	TD
2021	ARI	1	0	**1**	0	**1**	0.0	0	0	0	0.0	0	0	0	0	0	0	0	0
2025	HOU	**2**	0	**1**	0	**1**	0.0	0	0	0	0.0	0	0	0	0	0	0	0	0
Career		3	0	2	0	2	0.0	0	0	0	0.0	0	0	0	0	0	0	0	0

== Personal life ==
Three of Fotu's brothers have also played college football. Before focusing on football, Fotu also played rugby. Both of Fotu's parents were born in Tonga, but moved to America before Leki was born.
