= Orta Ləki =

- Municipality
- Location within Azerbaijan
- Coordinates: 40°31′23″N 47°25′16″E
- Country: Azerbaijan
- Rayon: Agdash

Population
  - Total: 5,863
- Time zone: UTC+4 (AZT)
  - Summer (DST): UTC+5 (AZT)

Orta Ləki (also, Läki and Orta-Lyaki) is a village and municipality in the Agdash Rayon of Azerbaijan. It has a population of 5,863. The municipality consists of the villages of Orta Ləki and Yuxarı Ləki.
