= Leki Lenhart =

German sports equipment company

Leki Lenhart GmbH
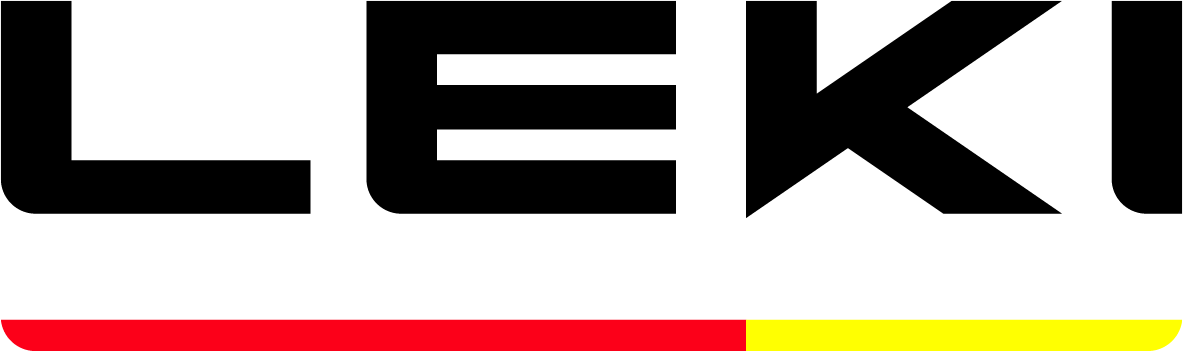
- Type: GmbH & Co. KG
- Industry: Sporting goods
- Founded: 1948
- Headquarters: Kirchheim unter Teck, Germany
- Key people: Friederike and Markus Lenhart (owners); Matthias Hatt and Martin Rominger (managing directors of Leki Lenhart GmbH)
- Revenue: €67.4 million (2023)
- Number of employees: 355
- Parent: SCHE 13 Beteiligungs GmbH & Co. KG
- Website: www.leki.com

Leki Lenhart GmbH (stylised as LEKI) is a German company producing sporting equipment. The company is based in Kirchheim unter Teck in Baden-Württemberg. Stuttgarter Zeitung describes Leki as a world market leader in ski and trekking poles.

== History ==
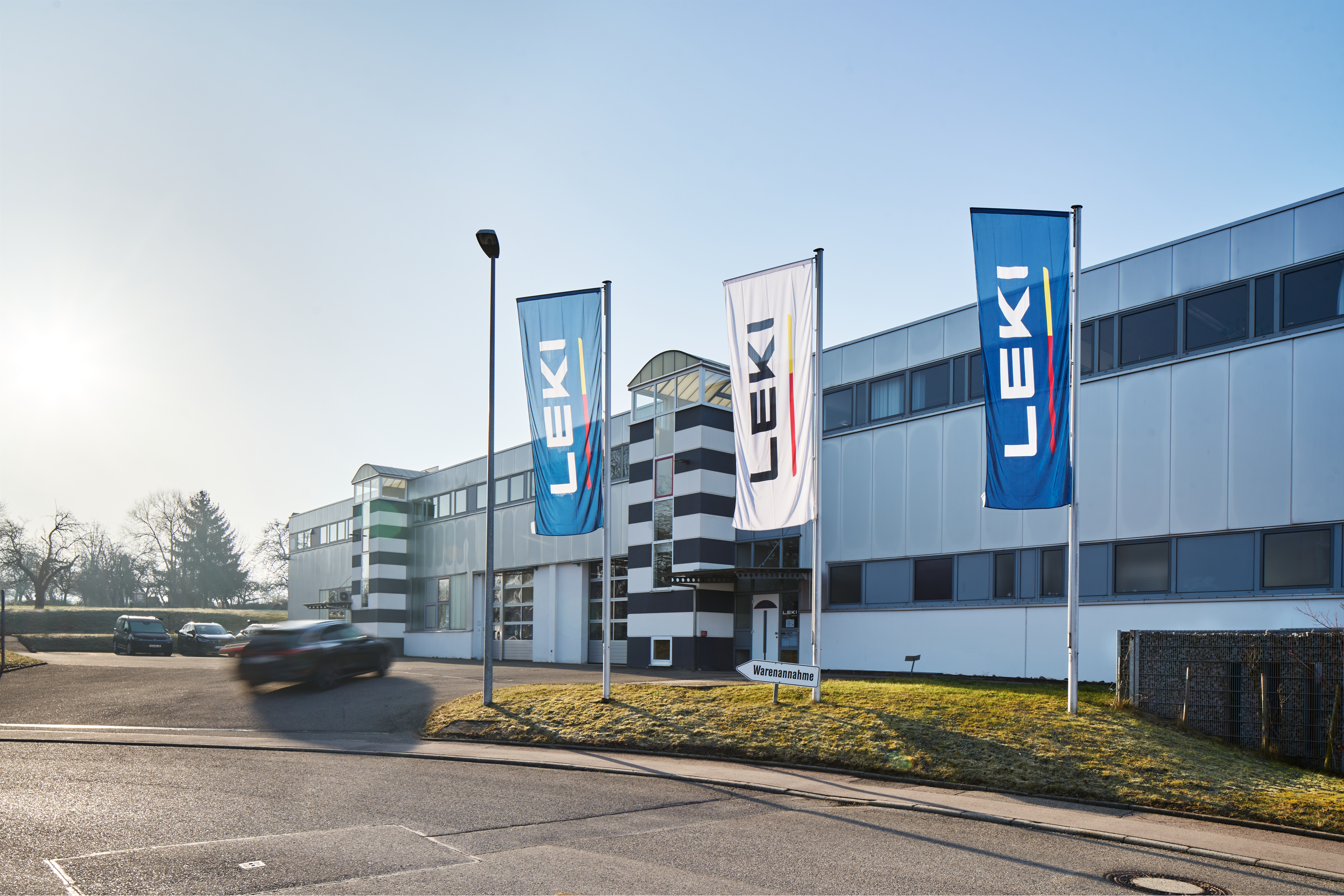
LEKI headquarter Kirchheim unter Teck

In 1948, Karl Lenhart founded a woodworking business in Dettingen unter Teck, which produced wooden lettering for various trades. In the 1970s, Leki developed adjustable trekking poles and entered the outdoor equipment sector. In 1978, Reinhold Messner and Peter Habeler climbed Mount Everest using the company's poles.

Klaus Lenhart (1 May 1955 – 30 April 2012), the founder's youngest son, joined the company's management at the age of 19. From 1984, Klaus Lenhart (together with his wife Waltraud Lenhart) held sole responsibility for management. Production of cross-country ski poles began in 1993. In 2000, a new production facility was opened in Tachov in the Czech Republic.

In 1997, the company was renamed Leki Lenhart GmbH. The name Leki derives from Lenhart in Kirchheim.

On 30 April 2012, managing director Klaus Lenhart died in the crash of his aerobatic aircraft, an Extra EA-300L, near Kirchheim unter Teck. The 24-year-old co-pilot of the two-seater aircraft survived with serious injuries. Management was subsequently taken over by Waltraud Lenhart.

In 2013, the company introduced foldable poles for the first time.

In 2021, Waltraud Lenhart died after a short serious illness. The family business was passed to the third generation, Friederike and Markus Lenhart. Management was taken over by Matthias Hatt and Martin Rominger.

In 2023, Leki introduced a trekking pole made from hemp fibres, developed with the German Institutes of Textile and Fibre Research Denkendorf.

== Corporate structure ==
Leki is a GmbH and part of the SCHE 13 Beteiligungs GmbH & Co. KG group. The consolidated group includes Leki Lenhart GmbH, Leki-Austria Handels GmbH and Novasport spol. s r.o., where the parent company holds a 69.75% capital stake in each. Group revenue amounted to €67.4 million in 2023, with 355 employees.

Since 2019, the managing directors of Leki have been Matthias Hatt and Martin Rominger. The company is based in Kirchheim unter Teck. Products are developed in design departments in the Czech Republic and Germany. Manufacturing takes place in the Czech Republic, while gloves are developed and produced in Asia. The products are distributed worldwide.

== Products ==
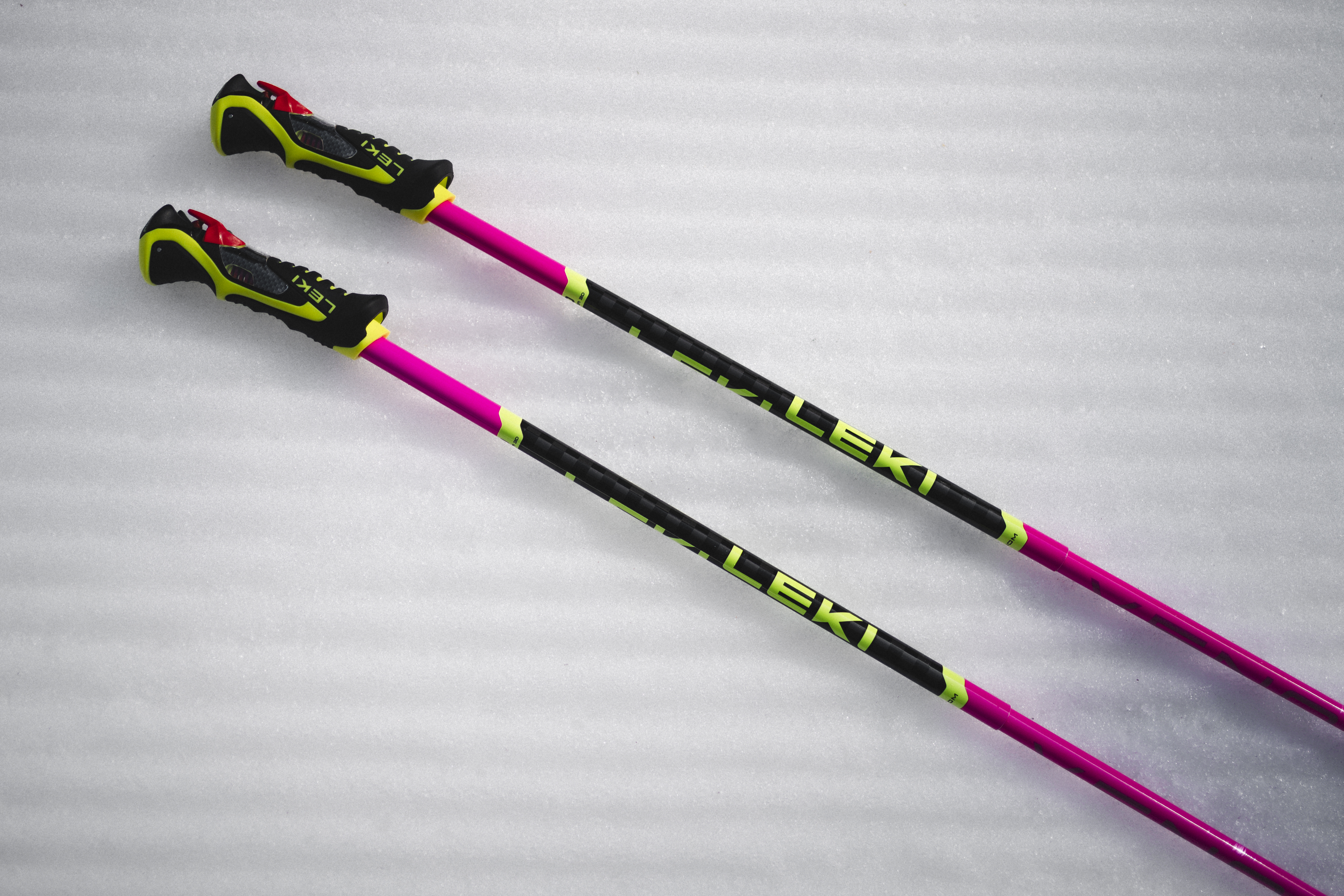
LEKI ski poles

Leki develops, produces and distributes sporting goods for activities such as Nordic walking, alpine skiing, trekking, freeskiing, cross-country skiing, trail running and roller skiing. The company's products primarily include poles such as ski poles, cross-country poles, ski touring poles, trekking poles, trail running poles and Nordic walking poles. In this product segment, Leki is frequently described as a world market leader. The company was among the first to use fibreglass materials in pole production in the 1960s and later developed the first adjustable trekking pole. Since 2023, it has also offered trekking poles made from hemp. The company also offers gloves.

Technical developments include the "Trigger" system for alpine poles and the derived "Trigger Shark" or "Shark" system for cross-country poles, in which the grip and strap or gloves are connected via a click mechanism.

Leki also offers a repair service for its products.

== Sponsoring ==
The company sponsors several athletes, particularly in winter sports, including the American alpine skiers Mikaela Shiffrin and Lindsey Vonn, the Czech biathlete Gabriela Soukalová and the German alpine skier Felix Neureuther.

Leki is also an equipment supplier to the German Ski Association, the Swedish Biathlon Federation, Swiss-Ski and the Italian Ski Federation (FISI) through the Pool Sci Italia association.

For the 2026 Winter Olympics, the company equipped around 200 athletes, including the Norwegian cross-country skier Johannes Høsflot Klæbo.

== Awards ==
In 2023, Leki received the ISPO Award for the trekking pole Hemp One Vario. The network Die Deutsche Wirtschaft lists the company as a Hidden champion.
