= Yuxarı Ləki =

- Location within Azerbaijan
- Coordinates: 40°31′39″N 47°25′39″E
- Country: Azerbaijan
- Rayon: Agdash
- Municipality: Orta Ləki
- Time zone: UTC+4 (AZT)
  - Summer (DST): UTC+5 (AZT)

Yuxarı Ləki (also, Yukhary Lyaki) is a village in the Agdash Rayon of Azerbaijan. The village forms part of the municipality of Orta Ləki.
