= 2019 Oregon Ducks football team =

American college football season

2019 Oregon Ducks football

Pac-12 champion Pac-12 North Division champion Rose Bowl champion

Pac-12 Championship Game, W 37–15 vs. Utah

Rose Bowl, W 28–27 vs. Wisconsin
- Conference: Pac-12 Conference
- North Division

Ranking
- Coaches: No. 5
- AP: No. 5
- Record: 12–2 (8–1 Pac-12)
- Head coach: Mario Cristobal (2nd season)
- Offensive coordinator: Marcus Arroyo (3rd season)
- Offensive scheme: Pistol
- Defensive coordinator: Andy Avalos (1st season)
- Base defense: 4–2–5
- Captain: Game captains
- Home stadium: Autzen Stadium

Uniform
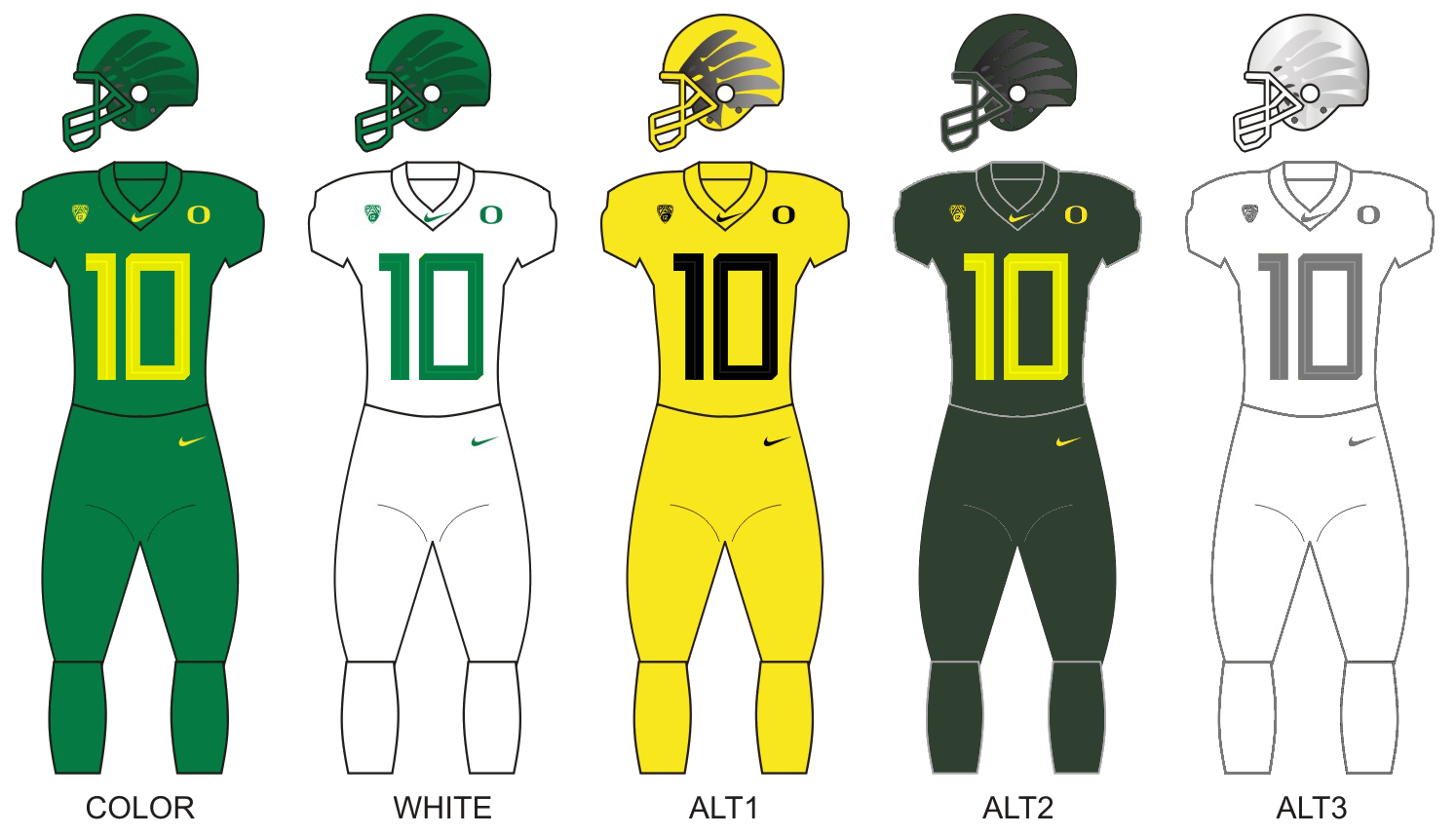

2019 Pac-12 Conference football standings
	Conf.			Overall
Team	W		L	W		L
North Division
No. 5 Oregon xy$	8	–	1	12	–	2
California	4	–	5	8	–	5
Washington	4	–	5	8	–	5
Oregon State	4	–	5	5	–	7
Washington State	3	–	6	6	–	7
Stanford	3	–	6	4	–	8
South Division
No. 16 Utah xy	8	–	1	11	–	3
USC	7	–	2	8	–	5
Arizona State	4	–	5	8	–	5
UCLA	4	–	5	4	–	8
Colorado	3	–	6	5	–	7
Arizona	2	–	7	4	–	8
Championship: Oregon 37, Utah 15
$ – Conference champion; x – Division champion/co-champions; y – Championship game participant; Rankings from AP Poll

The 2019 Oregon Ducks football team represented the University of Oregon during the 2019 NCAA Division I FBS football season. The team was led by second-year head coach Mario Cristobal. Oregon played their home games at Autzen Stadium in Eugene, Oregon. The Ducks competed as members of the North Division of the Pac-12 Conference.

Oregon started the year with a neutral-site game against Auburn in Arlington, Texas, where they lost, 27–21. The Ducks won their next nine games before being upset on the road by Arizona State, effectively knocking them out of contention for the College Football Playoff. With a regular season record of 10–2 (8–1 in Pac-12 play), Oregon represented the North Division in the Pac-12 Championship Game, where they defeated South Division champion and fifth-ranked Utah, 37–15, to win their first conference title since 2014. They received an invitation to the Rose Bowl, where they defeated Big Ten Conference runner-up Wisconsin, 28–27. Oregon was ranked fifth in the season's final AP Poll.

Oregon's offense was led by senior quarterback Justin Herbert, who passed for 3,471 yards and 34 touchdowns. Running back C. J. Verdell led the team in rushing with 1,220 yards and eight touchdowns. Offensive tackle Penei Sewell was a unanimous All-American and was the recipient of the Outland Trophy as the nation's best lineman on either side of the ball. Defensively, the team's leading tackler was linebacker Troy Dye, who was named second-team all-conference.

== Preseason ==
=== Award watch lists ===
Listed in the order that they were released

Award	Player	Position	Year
Lott Trophy	Troy Dye	LB	SR
Maxwell Award	Justin Herbert	QB	SR
Bednarik Award	Troy Dye	LB	SR
Davey O'Brien Award	Justin Herbert	QB	SR
Doak Walker Award	C. J. Verdell	RB	SO
John Mackey Award	Jake Breeland	TE	SR
Rimington Trophy	Jake Hanson	C	SR
Outland Trophy	Jake Hanson	C	SR
Outland Trophy	Jordon Scott	DT	JR
Bronko Nagurski Trophy	Troy Dye	LB	SR
Bronko Nagurski Trophy	Jordon Scott	DT	JR
Wuerffel Trophy	Justin Herbert	QB	SR
Wuerffel Trophy	Dallas Warmack	OL	SR
Walter Camp Award	Justin Herbert	QB	SR
Polynesian College Football Player Of The Year Award	Austin Faoliu	DL	JR
Polynesian College Football Player Of The Year Award	Penei Sewell	OL	SO
Johnny Unitas Golden Arm Award	Justin Herbert	QB	SR
Manning Award	Justin Herbert	QB	SR

=== Pac-12 media day ===
==== Pac-12 media poll ====
In the Pac-12 preseason media poll, Oregon was voted as the favorite to win North Division, finishing one vote ahead of defending conference champion Washington. The Ducks received the second-most votes to win the Pac-12 Championship Game behind Utah.

== Schedule ==
Date	Time	Opponent	Rank	Site	TV	Result	Attendance
August 31	4:30 p.m.	vs. No. 16 Auburn*	No. 11	AT&T Stadium; Arlington, TX (Advocare Classic, College GameDay)	ABC	L 21–27	60,662
September 7	4:30 p.m.	Nevada*	No. 16	Autzen Stadium; Eugene, OR	P12N	W 77–6	50,920
September 14	7:45 p.m.	No. 20 (FCS) Montana*	No. 15	Autzen Stadium; Eugene, OR	P12N	W 35–3	49,098
September 21	4:00 p.m.	at Stanford	No. 16	Stanford Stadium; Stanford, CA (rivalry)	ESPN	W 21–6	39,249
October 5	5:00 p.m.	California	No. 13	Autzen Stadium; Eugene, OR	FOX	W 17–7	54,766
October 11	7:00 p.m.	Colorado	No. 13	Autzen Stadium; Eugene, OR	FS1	W 45–3	50,529
October 19	12:30 p.m.	at No. 25 Washington	No. 12	Husky Stadium; Seattle, WA (rivalry)	ABC	W 35–31	70,867
October 26	7:30 p.m.	Washington State^{†}	No. 11	Autzen Stadium; Eugene, OR	ESPN	W 37–35	59,361
November 2	5:00 p.m.	at USC	No. 7	Los Angeles Memorial Coliseum; Los Angeles, CA (rivalry)	FOX	W 56–24	63,011
November 16	7:30 p.m.	Arizona	No. 6	Autzen Stadium; Eugene, OR	ESPN	W 34–6	54,219
November 23	4:30 p.m.	at Arizona State	No. 6	Sun Devil Stadium; Tempe, AZ	ABC	L 28–31	51,875
November 30	1:00 p.m.	Oregon State	No. 14	Autzen Stadium; Eugene, OR (Civil War)	P12N	W 24–10	56,243
December 6	5:00 p.m.	vs. No. 5 Utah*	No. 13	Levi's Stadium; Santa Clara, CA (Pac-12 Championship Game)	ABC	W 37–15	38,679
January 1, 2020	2:00 p.m.	vs. No. 7 Wisconsin*	No. 6	Rose Bowl; Pasadena, CA (Rose Bowl, College GameDay)	ESPN	W 28–27	90,462
*Non-conference game; ^{†}Homecoming; Rankings from AP Poll and CFP Rankings after November 5 released prior to game; All times are in Pacific time; Source:

== Rankings ==
Ranking movements Legend: ██ Increase in ranking ██ Decrease in ranking
	Week																
Poll	Pre	1	2	3	4	5	6	7	8	9	10	11	12	13	14	15	Final
AP	11	16	15	16	13	13	13	12	11	7	7	6	6	14	13	7	5
Coaches	13	18	17	17	13	13	13	12	11	8	7	6	6	13	13	6	5
CFP	Not released										7	6	6	14	13	6	Not released

== Personnel ==
=== Roster ===
2019 Oregon Ducks football team roster
Players
Coaches
Offense

Pos.	#	Name	Class
WR	3	Johnny Johnson III	Jr
WR	4	Mycah Pittman	Fr
RB	5	Sean Dollars	Fr
WR	6	Juwan Johnson	Sr
RB	7	C. J. Verdell	So
WR	9	Brenden Schooler	Sr
QB	10	Justin Herbert	Sr
QB	12	Tyler Shough	Fr
QB	16	Bradley Yaffe	Fr
QB	17	Cale Millen	Fr
TE	18	Spencer Webb	Fr
RB	20	Jayvaun Wilson	Fr
WR	21	Tevin Jeannis	Fr
RB	22	Darrian Felix	So
WR	23	Jack Vecchi	So
WR	24	Vincenzo Logan	Fr
WR	25	Kyle Buckner	Sr
RB	26	Travis Dye	So
TE	27	Jake Breeland	Sr
WR	29	Korbin Williams	Fr
WR	30	Jaylon Redd	Jr
RB	31	KJ Maduike	Fr
RB	33	Cyrus Habibi-Likio	Fr
WR	37	Isaiah Pitre	Fr
RB	40	Noah Dahl	So
RB	43	Demarques Singleton	Fr
TE	44	Matt Mariota	Sr
TE	48	Hunter Kampmoyer	Jr
TE	49	Tyler Nanney	Fr
OL	53	Ryan Walk	So
OL	54	Calvin Throckmorton	Sr
OL	55	Jake Hanson	Sr
OL	58	Penei Sewell	So
OL	59	Devin Lewis	Fr
OL	64	Charlie Landgraf	Sr
OL	66	Brady Aiello	Sr
OL	67	Cole Young	Fr
OL	68	Shane Lemieux	Sr
OL	70	Dawson Jaramillo	Fr
OL	71	Malaesala Aumavae-Laulu	Jr
OL	72	Sam Poutasi	Jr
OL	73	Justin Johnson	Fr
OL	74	Steven Jones	So
OL	75	Dallas Warmack	Sr
OL	77	George Moore	Sr
OL	78	Alex Forsyth	So
OL	79	Chris Randazzo	Fr
WR	80	Bryan Addison	Fr
TE	81	Patrick Herbert	Fr
WR	82	Justin Collins	Jr
WR	82	Jack Vecchi	Fr
WR	83	Josh Delgado	Fr
TE	84	Cameron McCormick	Jr
WR	85	JR Walters	Fr
WR	86	Lance Wilhoite	Fr
TE	87	Ryan Bay	Sr
WR	88	Isaiah Crocker	Fr
WR	89	JJ Tucker	Fr

Defense

Pos.	#	Name	Class
CB	2	Mykael Wright	Fr
CB	4	Thomas Graham Jr.	Jr
CB	6	Deommodore Lenoir	Jr
LB	7	D. J. Johnson	So
DB	10	Steve Stephens	Fr
CB	11	Trikweze Bridges	Fr
CB	12	D. J. James	Fr
CB	14	Haki Woods Jr.	Sr
CB	15	Kahlef Hailassie	So
DB	16	Nick Pickett	Jr
DB	17	Daewood Davis	So
DB	19	Jamal Hill	Fr
LB	22	Ge'mon Eaford	Fr
DB	23	Verone McKinley III	Fr
DB	25	Brady Breeze	So
LB	29	Adrian Jackson	So
LB	30	Andrew Johnson Jr.	Fr
DB	31	Sean Killpatrick	Sr
LB	32	La'Mar Winston Jr.	Sr
DB	33	Jordan Adeyemi-John	Fr
DL	34	Jordon Scott	Jr
LB	35	Troy Dye	Sr
DB	36	Charles Sudduth	Sr
DB	38	Lucas Noland	Fr
LB	41	Isaac Slade-Matautia	So
LB	42	MJ Cunningham	Fr
LB	43	Nick Weibe	Fr
DL	45	Gus Cumberlander	Sr
LB	46	Nate Heaukulani	Jr
LB	47	Mase Funa	Fr
LB	48	Treven Ma'ae	Fr
DL	50	Popo Aumavae	So
DL	51	Gary Baker	Sr
DL	52	Andrew Faoliu	Fr
LB	53	Matt Christman	Sr
LB	54	Dru Mathis	Jr
LB	55	Sampson Niu	Jr
DL	56	Bryson Young	Sr
LB	57	Ben Gomes	Sr
LB	85	Issac Townsend	Fr
DL	90	Drayton Carlberg	Sr
DT	91	Kristian Williams	Fr
DL	92	Miguel Nevarez	Fr
DL	93	Sione Kava	Sr
DT	94	Sua'ava Poti	Fr
DT	95	Keyon Ware-Hudson	Fr
DT	97	Brandon Dorlus	Fr
DL	99	Austin Faoliu	Jr

Special teams

Pos.	#	Name	Class
P	38	Tom Snee	So
K	40	Zach Emerson	Jr
P	42	Blake Maimone	Sr
LS	47	Peyton Yanagi	Fr
K	49	Camden Lewis	Fr
LS	63	Karsten Battles	So
K	90	Henry Katleman	Fr
K	91	Taylor Koth	Fr
K	96	Adam Stack	Jr

Head coach

- Mario Cristobal

Coordinators/assistant coaches

- Joe Salave'a – Associate head coach / Co-defensive coordinator / defensive line
- Marcus Arroyo – Assistant Head Coach / offensive coordinator / Quarterbacks & tight ends
- Andy Avalos – Co-defensive coordinator / inside linebackers
- Keith Heyward – Co-defensive coordinator / Safeties
- Bobby Williams – Special teams coordinator
- Michael Johnson – Wide Receivers
- Jim Mastro – Running Backs / Run Game Coordinator
- Alex Mirabal – Offensive line
- Cort Dennison – Outside Linebackers
- Donte Williams – Cornerbacks
- Aaron Feld – Strength and Conditioning
- Matt Fyle – Assistant Strength and Conditioning Coordinator
- Shaud Williams – Assistant Strength and Conditioning Coordinator
- Mark Davis – Assistant Strength and Conditioning Coordinator
- Ikaika Johnson – Graduate Assistant
- Jonathan Krause – Graduate Assistant
- Tre Watson – Graduate Assistant
- Cody Woodiel – Graduate Assistant
- Kwame Agyeman – Defensive Analyst
- Rod Chance – Defensive Analyst
- David Gilbertson – Offensive Analyst
- Danny Langsdorf – Offensive Analyst
- Chris Norris – Special Teams Analyst
- Matt Noyer – Director, Football Operations
- Kodi Look – Assistant Director of Football Operations
- Stephen Field – Director, Recruiting
- Funaki Asisi – Recruiting Assistant / Player Development
- Matt Leitch – Recruiting Assistant
- Eli Miller – Recruiting Assistant
- Da'Vell Winters – Recruiting Assistant / Player Development
- Thomas Arends – Director, Player Personnel / Pro Liaison
- Ryan Bartow – Director, High School Relations
- Cassidy Noyer – Director, External Relations
- Josh Heim – Director, Digital Media
- Alex Verdugo – Director, Graphic Design & Social Media
- Dustin Smith – Video Coordinator
- Steve Poehl – Video Production Coordinator
- Kenny Farr – Football Equipment Administrator
- Taylor Hughes – Sports Dietitian

Legend

- (C) Team captain
- (S) Suspended
- (I) Ineligible
- Injured
- Redshirt

Roster

=== Depth chart ===
Defense

FS
Nick Pickett
Brady Breeze

OLB	ILB	ILB	OLB
Lamar Winston Jr.	Troy Dye	Issac Slade-Matautia	Bryson Young
Adrian Jackson	Dru Mathis	Sampson Niu	D. J. Johnson

SS
Jevon Holland
Steve Stephens

CB
Thomas Graham Jr.
Verone McKinley III

DE	NT	DE
Austin Faoliu	Jordan Scott	Kayvon Thibodeaux
Drayton Carlberg	Gary Baker	Gus Cumberlander

CB
Deommodore Lenoir
Mykael Wright

Offense

WR
Daewood Davis
Bryan Addison

WR
Johnny Johnson III
Brenden Schooler

LT	LG	C	RG	RT
Penei Sewell	Shane Lemieux	Jake Hanson	Dallas Warmack	Calvin Throckmorton
George Moore	Alex Forsyth	Ryan Walk	Malaesala Aumavae-Laulu	Brady Aiello

TE
Cam McCormick
Jake Breeland

WR
Jaylon Redd
Justin Collins

QB
Justin Herbert
Tyler Shough

RB
C. J. Verdell
Travis Dye

Special teams
PK Adam Stack
PK Zach Emerson
Camden Lewis
P Blake Maimone
P Tom Snee
KR Jaylon Redd
PR Travis Dye
LS Karsten Battles
H Blake Maimone
Tom Snee

== Game summaries ==
=== Vs. Auburn ===
Uniform combination
Helmet	Jersey	Pants

Oregon Ducks vs. Auburn Tigers – Game summary

Quarter	1	2	3	4	Total
No. 11 Ducks	14	0	7	0	21
No. 16 Tigers	3	3	7	14	27

at AT&T Stadium • Arlington, Texas

- Date: August 31, 2019
- Game time: 6:30 pm
- Game weather: Indoors
- Game attendance: 60,662
- Referee: Reggie Smith
- TV announcers (ABC): Chris Fowler (play-by-play), Kirk Herbstreit (analyst), Maria Taylor (sideline reporter)

Game information

First quarter

- ORE – C. J. Verdell 1 Yd Run (Camden Lewis Kick), 10:13. Oregon 7–0. Drive: 11 plays, 74 yards, 4:47.
- AUB – Anders Carlson 40 Yd Field Goal, 3:17. Oregon 7–3. Drive: 6 plays, 58 yards, 1:25.
- ORE – Spencer Webb 20 Yd pass from Justin Herbert (Camden Lewis Kick), 2:11. Oregon 14–3. Drive: 3 plays, 75 yards, 1:06.

Second quarter

- AUB – Anders Carlson 25 Yd Field Goal, 4:41. Oregon 14–6. Drive: 4 plays, -4 yards, 1:34.

Third quarter

- ORE – Darrian Felix 6 Yd Run (Adam Stack Kick), 9:23. Oregon 21–6. Drive: 9 plays, 53 yards, 3:28.
- AUB – Eli Stove 11 Yd pass from Bo Nix (Anders Carlson Kick), 4:20. Oregon 21–13. Drive: 4 plays, 58 yards, 1:11.

Fourth quarter

- AUB – Joey Gatewood 1 Yd Run (Anders Carlson Kick), 9:48. Oregon 21–20. Drive: 8 plays, 69 yards, 2:56.
- AUB – Seth Williams 26 Yd pass from Bo Nix (Anders Carlson Kick), 0:09. Auburn 27–21. Drive: 11 plays, 60 yards, 2:05.

Top passers

- ORE – Justin Herbert – 28–37, 242 yards, 1 TD
- AUB – Bo Nix – 13–31, 177 yards, 2 TD, 2 INT

Top rushers

- ORE – C. J. Verdell – 14 carries, 76 yards, 1 TD
- AUB – JaTarvious Whitlow – 24 carries, 110 yards

Top receivers

- ORE – Johnny Johnson III – 7 receptions, 98 yards
- AUB – Sal Canella – 2 receptions, 42 yards

In Oregon's opening game, the Ducks squared off with the SEC's Auburn Tigers at AT&T Stadium in Arlington. The Ducks leaped out to a 21–6 lead but would give up the game's last 21 points, including a late TD strike from Bo Nix to Seth Williams with nine seconds remaining in the game to fall 27–21. Justin Herbert's two touchdown passes and C. J. Verdell's TD run in the first half would not be enough for the Ducks as they fell to 0–1 to begin the season.

=== Nevada ===
Uniform combination
Helmet	Jersey	Pants

Nevada Wolf Pack vs. Oregon Ducks – Game summary

Quarter	1	2	3	4	Total
Wolf Pack	3	3	0	0	6
No. 16 Ducks	7	28	28	14	77

at Autzen Stadium • Eugene, Oregon

- Date: September 7, 2019
- Game time: 4:30 pm
- Game weather: Temperature: 65 °F (18 °C) • Weather: Cloudy • Wind: SW 10 MPH
- Game attendance: 50,920
- Referee: Mike McCabe
- TV announcers (Pac-12 Network): Roxy Bernstein (play–by–play), Anthony Herron (analyst) and Jill Savage (sideline)

Game information

First quarter

- NEV – Brandon Talton 24 Yd Field Goal, 6:13. Nevada 3–0. Drive: 6 plays, 5 yards, 3:10.
- ORE – Jake Breeland 66 Yd pass from Justin Herbert (Camden Lewis Kick), 3:56. Oregon 7–3. Drive: 5 plays, 77 yards, 2:17.

Second quarter

- NEV – Brandon Talton 45 Yd Field Goal, 10:38. Oregon 7–6. Drive: 17 plays, 47 yards, 8:18.
- ORE – C. J. Verdell 2 Yd Run (Camden Lewis Kick), 8:28. Oregon 14–6. Drive: 6 plays, 75 yards, 2:10.
- ORE – Ryan Bay 16 Yd pass from Justin Herbert (Camden Lewis Kick), 7:31. Oregon 21–6. Drive: 2 plays, 35 yards, 0:28.
- ORE – Brady Aiello 1 Yd pass from Justin Herbert (Camden Lewis Kick), 3:26. Oregon 28–6. Drive: 3 plays, 7 yards, 1:24.
- ORE – Bryan Addison 24 Yd pass from Justin Herbert (Camden Lewis Kick), 0:12. Oregon 35–6. Drive: 7 plays, 77 yards, 1:23.

Third quarter

- ORE – Daewood Davis 16 Yd pass from Justin Herbert (Adam Stack Kick), 10:12. Oregon 42–6. Drive: 10 plays, 75 yards, 3:16.
- ORE – Cyrus Habibi-Likio 11 Yd Run (Adam Stack Kick), 8:14. Oregon 49–6. Drive: 4 plays, 22 yards, 1:35.
- ORE – Jaylon Redd 7 Yd pass from Tyler Shough (Adam Stack Kick), 7:16. Oregon 56–6. Drive: 3 plays, 5 yards, 0:40.
- ORE – Brady Breeze 11 Yd Fumble Return (Adam Stack Kick), 2:02. Oregon 63–6. Drive: 1 play, 4 yards, 0:09.

Fourth quarter

- ORE – Hunter Kampmoyer 21 Yd pass from Tyler Shough (Adam Stack Kick), 6:58. Oregon 70–6. Drive: 15 plays, 80 yards, 6:15.
- ORE – Darrian Felix 62 Yd Run (Adam Stack Kick), 2:02. Oregon 77–6. Drive: 3 plays, 75 yards, 1:04.

Top passers

- NEV – Carson Strong – 13–25, 89 yards, 2 INT
- ORE – Justin Herbert – 19–26, 310 yards, 5 TD

Top rushers

- NEV – Jaxson Kincaide – 13 carries, 52 yards
- ORE – Darrian Felix – 8 carries, 80 yards, 1 TD

Top receivers

- NEV – Kelton Moore – 1 reception, 23 yards
- ORE – Jake Breeland – 4 receptions, 112 yards, 1 TD

=== Montana ===
Uniform combination
Helmet	Jersey	Pants

Montana Grizzlies vs. Oregon Ducks – Game summary

Quarter	1	2	3	4	Total
No. 20 (FCS) Grizzlies	0	0	3	0	3
No. 15 Ducks	14	7	7	7	35

at Autzen Stadium • Eugene, Oregon

- Date: September 14, 2019
- Game time: 7:45 pm
- Game attendance: 49,098
- TV: Pac-12 Network

Game information

First quarter

- ORE – Jake Breeland 5 Yd pass from Justin Herbert (Camden Lewis Kick), 11:58. Oregon 7–0. Drive: 8 plays, 75 yards, 3:02.
- ORE – Jake Breeland 17 Yd pass from Justin Herbert (Camden Lewis Kick), 0:28. Oregon 14–0. Drive: 9 plays, 85 yards, 4:04.

Second quarter

- ORE – Johnny Johnson III 18 Yd pass from Justin Herbert (Camden Lewis Kick), 0:10. Oregon 21–0. Drive: 5 plays, 67 yards, 0:44.

Third quarter

- ORE – Johnny Johnson III 1 Yd pass from Justin Herbert (Camden Lewis Kick), 9:03. Oregon 28–0. Drive: 8 plays, 56 yards, 2:52.
- MONT – Brandon Purdy 25 Yd Field Goal, 0:18. Oregon 28–3. Drive: 11 plays, 68 yards, 5:48.

Fourth quarter

- ORE – Jaylon Redd 10 Yd pass from Justin Herbert (Camden Lewis Kick), 12:27. Oregon 35–3. Drive: 8 plays, 85 yards, 2:51.

Top passers

- MONT – Dalton Sneed – 20–30, 184 yards, 1 INT
- ORE – Justin Herbert – 30–42, 316 yards, 5 TD

Top rushers

- MONT – Marcus Knight – 10 carries, 19 yards
- ORE – Travis Dye – 17 carries, 101 yards

Top receivers

- MONT – Samuel Akem – 6 receptions, 85 yards
- ORE – Johnny Johnson III – 8 receptions, 76 yards, 2 TD

=== At Stanford ===
Uniform combination
Helmet	Jersey	Pants

Oregon Ducks vs. Stanford Cardinal – Game summary

Quarter	1	2	3	4	Total
No. 16 Ducks	7	7	0	7	21
Cardinal	3	0	0	3	6

at Stanford Stadium • Stanford, California

- Date: September 21, 2019
- Game time: 4:00 pm
- Game attendance: 39,249
- TV: ESPN

Game information

First quarter

- STAN – Jet Toner 32 Yd Field Goal, 8:43. Stanford 3–0. Drive: 12 plays, 61 yards, 6:17.
- ORE – Jaylon Redd 36 Yd pass from Justin Herbert (Camden Lewis Kick), 4:13. Oregon 7–3. Drive: 2 plays, 55 yards, 0:35.

Second quarter

- ORE – Jake Breeland 16 Yd pass from Justin Herbert (Camden Lewis Kick), 5:58. Oregon 14–3. Drive: 10 plays, 80 yards, 4:12.

Third quarter

- No scoring plays.

Fourth quarter

- ORE – Jake Breeland 24 Yd pass from Justin Herbert (Camden Lewis Kick), 10:40. Oregon 21–3. Drive: 5 plays, 50 yards, 2:01.
- STAN – Jet Toner 38 Yd Field Goal, 7:32. Oregon 21–6. Drive: 7 plays, 39 yards, 3:08.

Top passers

- ORE – Justin Herbert – 19–24, 259 yards, 3 TD
- STAN – K. J. Costello – 16–30, 120 yards, 1 INT

Top rushers

- ORE – C. J. Verdell – 24 carries, 82 yards
- STAN – Cameron Scarlett – 19 carries, 97 yards

Top receivers

- ORE – Jake Breeland – 5 receptions, 78 yards, 2 TD
- STAN – Michael Wilson – 5 receptions, 61 yards

The Ducks kicked off Pac-12 play by beating Stanford 21–6 in Palo Alto. Justin Herbert tossed three touchdown passes, two of them to Jacob Breeland, and the Ducks defense kept Stanford to just 120 yards passing to win their first conference game of the season

=== California ===
Uniform combination
Helmet	Jersey	Pants

California Golden Bears vs. Oregon Ducks – Game summary

Quarter	1	2	3	4	Total
Golden Bears	7	0	0	0	7
No. 13 Ducks	0	0	10	7	17

at Autzen Stadium • Eugene, Oregon

- Date: October 5, 2019
- Game time: 5:00 pm
- Game attendance: 54,766
- TV: FOX

Game information

First quarter

- CAL – Christopher Brown Jr. 22 Yd pass from Devon Modster (Greg Thomas Kick), 6:58. California 7–0. Drive: 6 plays, 63 yards, 2:09.

Second quarter

- No scoring plays.

Third quarter

- ORE – Camden Lewis 28 Yd Field Goal, 7:32. California 7–3. Drive: 13 plays, 72 yards, 5:36.
- ORE – Cyrus Habibi-Likio 1 Yd Run (Camden Lewis Kick), 1:38. Oregon 10–7. Drive: 3 plays, 30 yards, 1:01.

Fourth quarter

- ORE – Jaylon Redd 1 Yd pass from Justin Herbert (Camden Lewis Kick), 7:14. Oregon 17–7. Drive: 5 plays, 64 yards, 2:06.

Top passers

- CAL – Devon Modster – 17–34, 190 yards, 1 TD, 2 INT
- ORE – Justin Herbert – 20–33, 214 yards, 1 TD, 1 INT

Top rushers

- CAL – Christopher Brown Jr. – 15 carries, 42 yards
- ORE – Travis Dye – 15 carries, 81 yards

Top receivers

- CAL – Trevon Clark – 6 receptions, 69 yards
- ORE – Jake Breeland – 5 receptions, 87 yards

Despite a slow start at home, the Ducks scored 17 points in the second half to get the win over California. Freshman defensive lineman Kayvon Thibodeaux had two sacks for Oregon's defense and the Ducks ran for almost 200 yards against the Golden Bears.

=== Colorado ===
Uniform combination
Helmet	Jersey	Pants

Colorado Buffaloes vs. Oregon Ducks – Game summary

Quarter	1	2	3	4	Total
Buffaloes	3	0	0	0	3
No. 13 Ducks	7	17	14	7	45

at Autzen Stadium • Eugene, Oregon

- Date: October 11, 2019
- Game time: 7:00 pm
- Game attendance: 50,529
- TV: FS1

Game information

First quarter

Second quarter

Third quarter

Fourth quarter

Top passers

- CU – Steven Montez – 19–34, 131 yards, 4 INT
- ORE – Justin Herbert – 18–32, 261 yards, 2 TD

Top rushers

- CU – Alex Fontenot – 15 carries, 71 yards
- ORE – C. J. Verdell – 14 carries, 171 yards

Top receivers

- CU – Laviska Shenault – 4 receptions, 70 yards
- ORE – Jaylon Redd – 4 receptions, 75 yards, 1 TD

On Friday night at Autzen Stadium, the Ducks clobbered Colorado 45–3 to maintain control of the Pac-12 North. Oregon's running game accounted for 271 yards of offense, including four of their six touchdowns. Cyrus Habibi-Likio had three of the four rushing touchdowns. The Ducks defense also forced four turnovers in the win.

Scoring summary

Quarter	Time	Drive			Team	Scoring information	Score	
Quarter	Time	Plays	Yards	TOP	Team	Scoring information	Colorado	Oregon
1	11:37	9	75	3:23	Oregon	Jacob Breeland 7-yard touchdown reception from Justin Herbert, Camden Lewis kick good	0	7
1	2:46	13	72	4:47	Colorado	27-yard field goal by James Stefanou	3	7
2	14:10	11	62	3:36	Oregon	32-yard field goal by Camden Lewis	3	10
2	7:39	7	69	2:42	Oregon	Cyrus Habibi-Likio 1-yard touchdown run, Camden Lewis kick good	3	17
2	0:20	8	80	1:07	Oregon	Jaylon Redd 3-yard touchdown run, Camden Lewis kick good	3	24
3	12:54	5	40	1:23	Oregon	Jaylon Redd 13-yard touchdown reception from Justin Herbert, Camden Lewis kick good	3	31
3	10:40	1	7	0:04	Oregon	Cyrus Habibi-Likio 3-yard touchdown run, Camden Lewis kick good	3	38
4	14:36	6	85	2:17	Oregon	Cyrus Habibi-Likio 1-yard touchdown run, Camden Lewis kick good	3	45
"TOP" = time of possession. For other American football terms, see Glossary of American football.							3	45

=== At Washington ===
Uniform combination
Helmet	Jersey	Pants

Oregon Ducks vs. Washington Huskies – Game summary

Quarter	1	2	3	4	Total
No. 12 Ducks	7	7	14	7	35
No. 25 Huskies	7	14	10	0	31

at Husky Stadium • Seattle, Washington

- Date: October 19, 2019
- Game time: 12:30 pm
- Game attendance: 70,867
- TV: ABC

Game information

First quarter

- ORE – Spencer Webb 12 Yd pass from Justin Herbert (Camden Lewis Kick), 9:44. Oregon 7–0. Drive: 12 plays, 89 yards, 5:16.
- UW – Salvon Ahmed 9 Yd Run (Peyton Henry Kick), 0:20. Tied 7–7. Drive: 13 plays, 52 yards, 5:44.

Second quarter

- UW – Jordan Chin 48 Yd pass from Jacob Eason (Peyton Henry Kick), 12:48. Washington 14–7. Drive: 4 plays, 73 yards, 1:51.
- ORE – Jaylon Redd 16 Yd pass from Justin Herbert (Camden Lewis Kick), 2:59. Tied 14–14. Drive: 8 plays, 69 yards, 2:58.
- UW – Andre Baccellia 5 Yd pass from Jacob Eason (Peyton Henry Kick), 0:58. Washington 21–14. Drive: 8 plays, 75 yards, 2:01.

Third quarter

- UW – Puka Nacua 33 Yd pass from Jacob Eason (Peyton Henry Kick), 13:16. Washington 28–14. Drive: 4 plays, 74 yards, 1:44.
- ORE – Cyrus Habibi-Likio 14 Yd Run (Camden Lewis Kick), 8:36. Washington 28–21. Drive: 10 plays, 79 yards, 4:40.
- UW – Peyton Henry 30 Yd Field Goal, 3:39. Washington 31–21. Drive: 10 plays, 53 yards, 4:57.
- ORE – Mycah Pittman 36 Yd pass from Justin Herbert (Camden Lewis Kick), 0:00. Washington 31–28. Drive: 10 plays, 75 yards, 3:39.

Fourth quarter

- ORE – Jaylon Redd 5 Yd pass from Justin Herbert (Camden Lewis Kick), 5:10. Oregon 35–31. Drive: 8 plays, 70 yards, 3:26.

Top passers

- ORE – Justin Herbert – 24–38, 280 yards, 4 TD
- UW – Jacob Eason – 23–30, 289 yards, 3 TD

Top rushers

- ORE – Cyrus Habibi-Likio – 14 carries, 81 yards, 1 TD
- UW – Salvon Ahmed – 24 carries, 140 yards, 1 TD

Top receivers

- ORE – Johnny Johnson III – 5 receptions, 90 yards
- UW – Hunter Bryant – 3 receptions, 65 yards

With the Pac-12 North lead at stake, the Ducks traveled to Seattle to square off with arch-rival Washington. The game started as a back and forth battle, with both teams trading touchdowns in the first half. Washington built a 28–14 lead in the 3rd quarter thanks to three touchdown passes by Jacob Eason. Down a few scores late in the 3rd, the Ducks got a touchdown from Cyrus Habibi-Likio to cut the deficit to seven. After a Washington field goal, the Ducks responded with a 4th-down TD pass from Herbert to Mycah Pittman to end the 3rd Quarter that would cut Washington's lead to three. Midway through the 4th Quarter, still down by a field goal, the Ducks went to the ground attack to get close enough for Justin Herbert's five-yard TD strike to Jaylon Redd to give the Ducks the lead. Washington wouldn't bow down as they sustained a good drive late in the 4th, but an incomplete pass on 4th and 3 with a minute to go gave Oregon the win. The Ducks would take a three-game lead in the Pac-12 North with only five games to go.

=== Washington State ===
Uniform combination
Helmet	Jersey	Pants

Washington State Cougars vs. Oregon Ducks – Game summary

Quarter	1	2	3	4	Total
Cougars	3	14	3	15	35
No. 11 Ducks	9	8	7	13	37

at Autzen Stadium • Eugene, Oregon

- Date: October 26, 2019
- Game time: 7:30 pm
- Game attendance: 59,361
- TV: ESPN

Game information

First quarter

- WSU – Blake Mazza 36 Yd Field Goal, 7:26. Washington State 3–0. Drive: 9 plays, 56 yards, 3:49.
- ORE – Camden Lewis 40 Yd Field Goal, 3:11. Tied 3–3. Drive: 9 plays, 53 yards, 4:15.
- ORE – C. J. Verdell 89 Yd Run (Camden Lewis PAT failed), 1:15. Oregon 9–3. Drive: 1 play, 89 yards, 0:12.

Second quarter

- WSU – Max Borghi 1 Yd Run (Blake Mazza Kick), 6:59. Washington State 10–9. Drive: 7 plays, 51 yards, 3:40.
- ORE – Jevon Holland 19 Yd Interception Return (Justin Herbert–Johnny Johnson III pass), 1:51. Oregon 17–10. Drive: 3 plays, -15 yards, 0:53.
- WSU – Renard Bell 15 Yd pass from Anthony Gordon (Blake Mazza Kick), 0:47. Tied 17–17. Drive: 3 plays, 59 yards, 1:04.

Third quarter

- ORE – C. J. Verdell 2 Yd Run (Camden Lewis Kick), 6:47. Oregon 24–17. Drive: 14 plays, 65 yards, 6:40.
- WSU – Blake Mazza 23 Yd Field Goal, 2:40. Oregon 24–20. Drive: 12 plays, 78 yards, 4:07.

Fourth quarter

- ORE – C. J. Verdell 1 Yd Run (Camden Lewis Kick), 13:20. Oregon 31–20. Drive: 9 plays, 75 yards, 4:20.
- WSU – Brandon Arconado 19 Yd pass from Anthony Gordon (Anthony Gordon–Brandon Arconado pass), 11:01. Oregon 31–28. Drive: 7 plays, 78 yards, 2:19.
- ORE – Camden Lewis 30 Yd Field Goal, 6:29. Oregon 34–28. Drive: 12 plays, 52 yards, 4:32.
- WSU – Brandon Arconado 5 Yd pass from Anthony Gordon (Blake Mazza Kick), 1:00. Washington State 35–34. Drive: 8 plays, 90 yards, 2:06.
- ORE – Camden Lewis 26 Yd Field Goal, 0:00. Oregon 37–35. Drive: 7 plays, 53 yards, 1:00.

Top passers

- WSU – Anthony Gordon – 32–50, 406 yards, 3 TD, 2 INT
- ORE – Justin Herbert – 21–30, 222 yards

Top rushers

- WSU – Max Borghi – 8 carries, 54 yards, 1 TD
- ORE – C. J. Verdell – 23 carries, 257 yards, 3 TD

Top receivers

- WSU – Brandon Arconado – 9 receptions, 130 yards, 2 TD
- ORE – Juwan Johnson – 4 receptions, 64 yards

In another revenge game from last season, the Ducks defeated Washington State 37–35 at Autzen Stadium. It was an epic back-and-forth battle with both teams trading scores. But C. J. Verdell accounted for over 250 yards of offense and freshman kicker Camden Lewis nailed a last second field goal to give the Ducks the win at home, their first over the Cougars since 2014.

=== At USC ===
Uniform combination
Helmet	Jersey	Pants

Oregon Ducks vs. USC Trojans – Game summary

Quarter	1	2	3	4	Total
No. 7 Ducks	0	28	14	14	56
Trojans	10	7	0	7	24

at Los Angeles Memorial Coliseum • Los Angeles, California

- Date: November 2, 2019
- Game time: 5:00 pm
- Game attendance: 63,011
- TV announcers (FOX): Gus Johnson, Joel Klatt, Jenny Taft

Game information

First quarter

- USC – Drake London 8 Yd pass from Kedon Slovis (Chase McGrath Kick), 9:15. USC 7–0. Drive: 16 plays, 77 yards, 5:45.
- USC – Chase McGrath 24 Yd Field Goal, 3:00. USC 10–0. Drive: 4 plays, 2 yards, 0:55.

Second quarter

- ORE – Justin Herbert 10 Yd Run (Camden Lewis Kick), 10:11. USC 10–7. Drive: 6 plays, 59 yards, 2:14.
- ORE – Jaylon Redd 2 Yd Run (Camden Lewis Kick), 2:36. Oregon 14–10. Drive: 9 plays, 92 yards, 3:06.
- ORE – Brady Breeze 32 Yd Interception Return (Camden Lewis Kick), 2:16. Oregon 21–10. Drive: 2 plays, 0 yards, 0:20.
- USC – Michael Pittman Jr. 13 Yd pass from Kedon Slovis (Chase McGrath Kick), 0:20. Oregon 21–17. Drive: 9 plays, 74 yards, 1:56.
- ORE – Mykael Wright 100 Yd Kickoff Return (Camden Lewis Kick), 0:08. Oregon 28–17. Drive: 0 plays, 0 yards, 0:12.

Third quarter

- ORE – Juwan Johnson 15 Yd pass from Justin Herbert (Camden Lewis Kick), 11:39. Oregon 35–17. Drive: 7 plays, 80 yards, 3:21.
- ORE – Juwan Johnson 11 Yd pass from Justin Herbert (Camden Lewis Kick), 6:14. Oregon 42–17. Drive: 6 plays, 34 yards, 2:26.

Fourth quarter

- ORE – Juwan Johnson 37 Yd pass from Justin Herbert (Camden Lewis Kick), 13:55. Oregon 49–17. Drive: 9 plays, 92 yards, 4:14.
- ORE – Mycah Pittman 35 Yd pass from Tyler Shough (Camden Lewis Kick), 6:50. Oregon 56–17. Drive: 9 plays, 91 yards, 5:05.
- USC – Kyle Ford 20 Yd pass from Kedon Slovis (Chase McGrath Kick), 3:11. Oregon 56–24. Drive: 7 plays, 75 yards, 3:39.

Top passers

- ORE – Justin Herbert – 21–26, 225 yards, 3 TD, 1 INT
- USC – Kedon Slovis – 32–57, 264 yards, 3 TD, 3 INT

Top rushers

- ORE – Travis Dye – 12 carries, 75 yards
- USC – Kenan Christon – 15 carries, 79 yards

Top receivers

- ORE – Juwan Johnson – 7 receptions, 106 yards, 3 TD
- USC – Tyler Vaughns – 8 receptions, 75 yards

Many believed this matchup to be Oregon's final test before reaching the College Football Playoff as the Ducks visited the USC Trojans. While USC was 5–3, they hadn't lost a home game all season – including an upset win over #10 Utah in Week 4. In a high-scoring game, Juwan Johnson scored three 3rd Quarter touchdowns and Oregon's defense frustrated the USC offense by getting sacks and turnovers en route to a 56–24 victory at the LA Coliseum. The Ducks fell in an early 10–0 hole, but held the Trojans to 14 points the rest of the game and scored touchdowns on defense and special teams to pick up the win.

=== Arizona ===
Uniform combination
Helmet	Jersey	Pants

Arizona Wildcats vs. Oregon Ducks – Game summary

Quarter	1	2	3	4	Total
Wildcats	0	6	0	0	6
No. 6 Ducks	14	7	7	6	34

at Autzen Stadium • Eugene, Oregon

- Date: November 16, 2019
- Game time: 7:30 pm
- Game attendance: 54,219
- TV: ESPN

Game information

First quarter

- ORE – Johnny Johnson III 73 Yd pass from Justin Herbert (Camden Lewis Kick), 14:28. Oregon 7–0. Drive: 2 plays, 75 yards, 0:32.
- ORE – Cyrus Habibi-Likio 1 Yd Run (Camden Lewis Kick), 1:57. Oregon 14–0. Drive: 13 plays, 76 yards, 6:01.

Second quarter

- ORE – Juwan Johnson 53 Yd pass from Justin Herbert (Camden Lewis Kick), 5:09. Oregon 21–0. Drive: 7 plays, 80 yards, 3:01.
- UA – Lucas Havrisik 23 Yd Field Goal, 2:56. Oregon 21–3. Drive: 7 plays, 48 yards, 2:13.
- UA – Lucas Havrisik 42 Yd Field Goal, 0:00. Oregon 21–6. Drive: 6 plays, 39 yards, 0:55.

Third quarter

- ORE – Spencer Webb 24 Yd pass from Justin Herbert (Camden Lewis Kick), 7:32. Oregon 28–6. Drive: 4 plays, 41 yards, 1:45.

Fourth quarter

- ORE – Travis Dye 33 Yd pass from Justin Herbert (Camden Lewis kick failed), 10:02. Oregon 34–6. Drive: 8 plays, 88 yards, 4:14.

Top passers

- UA – Grant Gunnell – 10–14, 82 yards
- ORE – Justin Herbert – 20–28, 333 yards, 4 TD, 1 INT

Top rushers

- UA – J. J. Taylor – 17 carries, 74 yards
- ORE – Travis Dye – 14 carries, 71 yards

Top receivers

- UA – J. J. Taylor – 6 receptions, 55 yards
- ORE – Juwan Johnson – 5 receptions, 93 yards, 1 TD

The Ducks dominated from start to finish and defeated Arizona 34–6 in another revenge game from last season. Herbert tossed four more touchdown passes in the victory. In addition to the win, the Ducks locked up the Pac-12 North division and clinched a spot in the Pac-12 Championship for the first time since 2014.

=== At Arizona State ===
Uniform combination
Helmet	Jersey	Pants

Oregon Ducks vs. Arizona State Sun Devils – Game summary

Quarter	1	2	3	4	Total
No. 6 Ducks	7	0	0	21	28
Sun Devils	7	3	3	18	31

at Sun Devil Stadium • Tempe, Arizona

- Date: November 23, 2019
- Game time: 4:30 pm
- Game attendance: 65,870
- TV: ABC

Game information

First quarter

- ORE – Cyrus Habibi-Likio 5 Yd Run (Camden Lewis Kick), 6:32. Oregon 7–0. Drive: 11 plays, 80 yards, 3:48.
- ASU – Frank Darby 57 Yd pass from Jayden Daniels (Christian Zendejas Kick), 4:55. Tied 7–7. Drive: 4 plays, 75 yards, 1:37.

Second quarter

- ASU – Christian Zendejas 25 Yd Field Goal, 3:40. Arizona State 10–7. Drive: 11 plays, 69 yards, 6:54.

Third quarter

- ASU – Christian Zendejas 28 Yd Field Goal, 12:13. Arizona State 13–7. Drive: 7 plays, 65 yards, 2:47.

Fourth quarter

- ASU – Frank Darby 26 Yd pass from Jayden Daniels (Jayden Daniels–Eno Benjamin pass), 12:43. Arizona State 21–7. Drive: 4 plays, 32 yards, 2:10.
- ASU – Christian Zendejas 22 Yd Field Goal, 8:42. Arizona State 24–7. Drive: 6 plays, 16 yards, 3:17.
- ORE – Cyrus Habibi-Likio 10 Yd Run (Camden Lewis Kick), 7:43. Arizona State 24–14. Drive: 3 plays, 75 yards, 0:59.
- ORE – Johnny Johnson III 24 Yd pass from Justin Herbert (Camden Lewis Kick), 5:24. Arizona State 24–21. Drive: 3 plays, 66 yards, 0:43.
- ASU – Brandon Aiyuk 81 Yd pass from Jayden Daniels (Christian Zendejas Kick), 3:54. Arizona State 31–21. Drive: 3 plays, 75 yards, 1:30.
- ORE – Johnny Johnson III 17 Yd pass from Justin Herbert (Camden Lewis Kick), 2:04. Arizona State 31–28. Drive: 9 plays, 61 yards, 1:50.

Top passers

- ORE – Justin Herbert – 20–36, 304 yards, 2 TD, 2 INT
- ASU – Jayden Daniels – 22–32, 408 yards, 3 TD

Top rushers

- ORE – C. J. Verdell – 18 carries, 99 yards
- ASU – Eno Benjamin – 31 carries, 114 yards

Top receivers

- ORE – Johnny Johnson III – 10 receptions, 207 yards, 2 TD
- ASU – Brandon Aiyuk – 7 receptions, 161 yards, 1 TD

On a Saturday night in the desert, the Ducks struggled to stop Jayden Daniels and his group of wide receivers throughout the game. Oregon trailed Arizona State 24–7 in the 4th Quarter, but Herbert and Johnny Johnson III hooked up twice for touchdowns to pull Oregon within three. But on the next possession for the Sun Devils, Daniels hit Brandon Aiyuk on 3rd and 16 for an 84-yard touchdown to seal the deal late in the 4th quarter. The Ducks would get one more touchdown from Johnson but it would not be enough as they suffered a 31–28 loss in Tempe. It would eventually knock out any chance Oregon would have to make it to the College Football Playoff.

=== Oregon State ===
Uniform combination
Helmet	Jersey	Pants

Oregon State Beavers vs. Oregon Ducks – Game summary

Quarter	1	2	3	4	Total
Beavers	3	0	0	7	10
No. 14 Ducks	10	7	0	7	24

at Autzen Stadium • Eugene, Oregon

- Date: November 30, 2019
- Game time: 1:00 pm
- Game attendance: 56,243
- TV: Pac-12 Network

Game information

First quarter

- ORE – Camden Lewis 32 Yd Field Goal, 8:26. Oregon 3–0. Drive: 16 plays, 56 yards, 6:34.
- OSU – Everett Hayes 40 Yd Field Goal, 3:00. Tied 3–3. Drive: 12 plays, 63 yards, 5:26.
- ORE – Mykael Wright 98 Yd Kickoff Return (Camden Lewis Kick), 2:47. Oregon 10–3. Drive: 0 plays, 0 yards, 0:00.

Second quarter

- ORE – Johnny Johnson III 28 Yd pass from Justin Herbert (Camden Lewis Kick), 12:55. Oregon 17–3. Drive: 2 plays, 39 yards, 0:32.

Third quarter

- No scoring plays.

Fourth quarter

- OSU – Jermar Jefferson 19 Yd Run (Everett Hayes Kick), 11:03. Oregon 17–10. Drive: 11 plays, 87 yards, 4:50.
- ORE – Cyrus Habibi-Likio 20 Yd Run (Camden Lewis Kick), 1:15. Oregon 24–10. Drive: 3 plays, 27 yards, 0:52.

Top passers

- OSU – Tristan Gebbia – 26–40, 243 yards
- ORE – Justin Herbert – 18–30, 174 yards, 1 TD

Top rushers

- OSU – Jermar Jefferson – 20 carries, 81 yards, 1 TD
- ORE – Travis Dye – 12 carries, 91 yards

Top receivers

- OSU – Isaiah Hodgins – 8 receptions, 85 yards
- ORE – Johnny Johnson III – 4 receptions, 39 yards, 1 TD

In the latest edition of the Civil War rivalry, the Ducks' special teams came to life with a Mykael Wright 94-yard kick return TD in the 1st half. The Ducks defense kept a hot Oregon State out of the end zone en route to a 24–10 win. The Ducks ended the regular season 10–2 and earned a spot in the Pac-12 title game.

=== Vs. Utah (Pac-12 Championship game) ===
Uniform combination
Helmet	Jersey	Pants

Utah Utes vs. Oregon Ducks – Game summary

Quarter	1	2	3	4	Total
No. 5 Utes	0	0	15	0	15
No. 13 Ducks	10	10	3	14	37

at Levi's Stadium • Santa Clara, California

- Date: December 6, 2019
- Game time: 5:00 pm
- Game attendance: 38,679
- TV: ABC

Game information

First quarter

- ORE – C. J. Verdell 3 Yd Run (Camden Lewis Kick), 8:00. Oregon 7–0. Drive: 9 plays, 67 yards, 3:43.
- ORE – Camden Lewis 23 Yd Field Goal, 4:17. Oregon 10–0. Drive: 6 plays, 56 yards, 2:43.

Second quarter

- ORE – Johnny Johnson III 45 Yd pass from Justin Herbert (Camden Lewis Kick), 11:02. Oregon 17–0. Drive: 3 plays, 70 yards, 1:10.
- ORE – Camden Lewis 30 Yd Field Goal, 4:56. Oregon 20–0. Drive: 10 plays, 57 yards, 4:03.

Third quarter

- UTAH – Zack Moss 24 Yd pass from Tyler Huntley (Jadon Redding Kick), 10:52. Oregon 20–7. Drive: 6 plays, 53 yards, 2:27.
- ORE – Camden Lewis 25 Yd Field Goal, 4:56. Oregon 23–7. Drive: 8 plays, 43 yards, 2:49.
- UTAH – Samson Nacua 25 Yd pass from Tyler Huntley (Tyler Huntley–Samson Nacua pass), 1:13. Oregon 23–15. Drive: 7 plays, 75 yards, 3:43.

Fourth quarter

- ORE – C. J. Verdell 70 Yd Run (Camden Lewis Kick), 7:09. Oregon 30–15. Drive: 5 plays, 90 yards, 2:19.
- ORE – C. J. Verdell 31 Yd Run (Camden Lewis Kick), 2:33. Oregon 37–15. Drive: 2 plays, 35 yards, 0:49.

Top passers

- UTAH – Tyler Huntley – 17–29, 193 yards, 2 TD, 2 INT
- ORE – Justin Herbert – 14–26, 193 yards, 1 TD

Top rushers

- UTAH – Zack Moss – 19 carries, 113 yards
- ORE – C. J. Verdell – 18 carries, 208 yards, 3 TD

Top receivers

- UTAH – Zack Moss – 4 receptions, 57 yards, 1 TD
- ORE – Johnny Johnson III – 6 receptions, 87 yards, 1 TD

Oregon squared off with the Utah Utes, the Pac-12 South champions, in the Pac-12 Championship. Oregon would head to the Rose Bowl with a win, while Utah, ranked number 5 at the time, was playing for a spot in the College Football Playoff. Oregon started off fast, stopping Utah on two 4th and 1's, forcing an interception, and scoring 20 points in the 1st half. C. J. Verdell scored on Oregon's first drive while Herbert hit Johnny Johnson III for a 49-yard TD strike in the 2nd quarter. Utah would respond in the 2nd half. After Oregon failed to score on their first drive of the half, the Utes would get on the board with a rushing TD from Zack Moss. Following a field goal by Camden Lewis, the Utes would get a touchdown and two-point conversion from Samson Nacua to make it 23–15 Oregon. The Ducks would put the game away midway through the 4th quarter when Verdell rushed for a 70-yard touchdown to give Oregon a 15-point lead late in the game. Utah attempted a comeback, but Tyler Huntley was picked off by Troy Dye with three minutes to play in the game. The Ducks would capitalize two plays later with another touchdown run by Verdell from 31 yards out, making it 37–15 Oregon and sealing the victory. The Ducks headed into the postseason at 11–2 and secured a spot in the Rose Bowl. The loss ended Utah's bid for a College Football Playoff spot.

=== Vs. Wisconsin (2020 Rose Bowl Game) ===
Uniform combination
Helmet	Jersey	Pants

Oregon Ducks vs. Wisconsin Badgers – Game summary

Quarter	1	2	3	4	Total
No. 6 Ducks	7	7	7	7	28
No. 8 Badgers	10	7	7	3	27

at Rose Bowl Stadium • Pasadena, California

- Date: January 1, 2020
- Game time: 2:10 pm
- Game attendance: 90,462
- TV: ESPN

Game information

First quarter

- ORE – Justin Herbert 4 Yd Run (Camden Lewis Kick), 9:53. Oregon 7–0. Drive: 12 plays, 75 yards, 5:07.
- WISC – Aron Cruickshank 95 Yd Kickoff Return (Collin Larsh Kick), 9:41, Tied 7–7. Drive: 0 plays, 0 yards, 0:12.
- WISC – Collin Larsh 44 Yd Field Goal, 8:05. Wisconsin 10–7. Drive: 4 plays, 1 yard, 1:30.

Second quarter

- ORE – Justin Herbert 5 Yd Run (Camden Lewis Kick), 3:16. Oregon 14–10. Drive: 3 plays, 33 yards, 0:47.
- WISC – Quintez Cephus 11 Yd pass from Jack Coan (Collin Larsh Kick), 0:11. Wisconsin 17–14. Drive: 8 plays, 53 yards, 3:05.

Third quarter

- ORE – Brady Breeze 31 Yd Fumble Return (Camden Lewis Kick), 11:57. Oregon 21–17. Drive: 7 plays, 8 yards, 3:03.
- WISC – Mason Stokke 2 Yd Run (Collin Larsh Kick), 4:53. Wisconsin 24–21. Drive: 11 plays, 65 yards, 7:04.

Fourth quarter

- WISC – Collin Larsh 27 Yd Field Goal, 12:09. Wisconsin 27–21. Drive: 11 plays, 51 yards, 5:53.
- ORE – Justin Herbert 30 Yd Run (Camden Lewis Kick), 7:41. Oregon 28–27. Drive: 1 play, 30 yards, 0:10.

Top passers

- ORE – Justin Herbert – 14–20, 138 yards, 1 INT
- WISC – Jack Coan – 23–35, 186 yards, 1 TD, 1 INT

Top rushers

- ORE – C. J. Verdell – 17 carries, 49 yards
- WISC – Jonathan Taylor – 21 carries, 94 yards

Top receivers

- ORE – Juwan Johnson – 5 receptions, 66 yards
- WISC – Quintez Cephus – 7 receptions, 59 yards, 1 TD

The Ducks would meet the Big Ten runner-up, the 10–3 Wisconsin Badgers, in the Rose Bowl in Pasadena for a rematch of the 2012 Rose Bowl. The game started out well for Oregon as they scored a touchdown on their opening possession from Justin Herbert on a QB run. The Badgers would return the ensuing kickoff for a touchdown to tie it up. After Wisconsin kicked a field goal to make it 10–7, Herbert ran for his second score of the game to give Oregon the lead, 14–10. Wisconsin would respond as Jack Coan found Quintez Cephus for a short touchdown to give Wisconsin a 17–14 lead at halftime. Wisconsin did not get much going on their first drive of the 3rd quarter, leading to a punt. But Oregon's special teams managed to block the punt and Brady Breeze took the blocked punt to the end zone to put Oregon up 21–17. Wisconsin's defense held off the Ducks offense and put up the next 10 points to go up 27–21 in the 4th quarter. But during a possession late in the game, Wisconsin RB Jonathan Taylor fumbled the football, which was recovered by Oregon. On the next play, Herbert would keep it himself for a 30-yard touchdown run, his third of the game, to put the Ducks up 28–27. The Ducks defense would stop the Badgers on their final two possessions and Oregon ran out the clock to secure the win. The Ducks won their first Rose Bowl since 2014 and finished the season 12–2 and Rose Bowl Champions.

== Players drafted into the NFL ==
The Ducks had four players selected in the 2020 NFL draft.

Round	Pick	Player	Position	NFL club
1	6	Justin Herbert	QB	Los Angeles Chargers
4	132	Troy Dye	ILB	Minnesota Vikings
5	150	Shane Lemieux	OG	New York Giants
6	208	Jake Hanson	C	Green Bay Packers
