= 2019 Oregon State Beavers football team =

American college football season

2019 Oregon State Beavers football
- Conference: Pac-12 Conference
- North Division
- Record: 5–7 (4–5 Pac-12)
- Head coach: Jonathan Smith (2nd season)
- Offensive coordinator: Brian Lindgren (2nd season)
- Offensive scheme: Spread
- Defensive coordinator: Tim Tibesar (2nd season)
- Base defense: Multiple 4–2–5
- Home stadium: Reser Stadium

Uniform
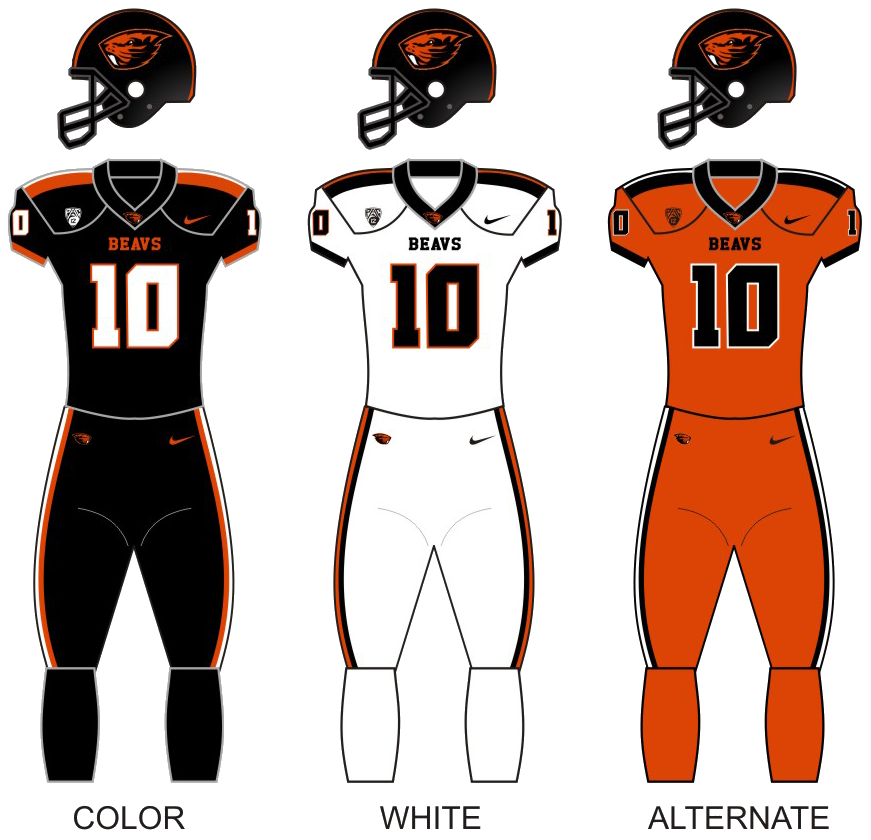

2019 Pac-12 Conference football standings
	Conf.			Overall
Team	W		L	W		L
North Division
No. 5 Oregon xy$	8	–	1	12	–	2
California	4	–	5	8	–	5
Washington	4	–	5	8	–	5
Oregon State	4	–	5	5	–	7
Washington State	3	–	6	6	–	7
Stanford	3	–	6	4	–	8
South Division
No. 16 Utah xy	8	–	1	11	–	3
USC	7	–	2	8	–	5
Arizona State	4	–	5	8	–	5
UCLA	4	–	5	4	–	8
Colorado	3	–	6	5	–	7
Arizona	2	–	7	4	–	8
Championship: Oregon 37, Utah 15
$ – Conference champion; x – Division champion/co-champions; y – Championship game participant; Rankings from AP Poll

The 2019 Oregon State Beavers football team represented Oregon State University during the 2019 NCAA Division I FBS football season. The team played their home games on campus at Reser Stadium in Corvallis, Oregon as a member of the North Division of the Pac-12 Conference. They were led by second-year head coach Jonathan Smith. They finished the season 5–7, 4–5 in Pac-12 play to finish in a three-way tie for second place in the North Division.

== Preseason ==
=== Pac-12 media day ===
==== Pac-12 media poll ====
In the Pac-12 preseason media poll, Oregon State was voted to finish in last place in the North Division.

== Schedule ==
Date	Time	Opponent	Site	TV	Result	Attendance
August 30	7:30 p.m.	Oklahoma State*	Reser Stadium; Corvallis, OR	FS1	L 36–52	31,681
September 7	9:00 p.m.	at Hawaii*	Aloha Stadium; Honolulu, HI	SPEC HI	L 28–31	26,807
September 14	1:15 p.m.	Cal Poly*	Reser Stadium; Corvallis, OR	P12N	W 45–7	33,585
September 28	4:00 p.m.	Stanford	Reser Stadium; Corvallis, OR	P12N	L 28–31	32,326
October 5	6:00 p.m.	at UCLA	Rose Bowl; Pasadena, CA	P12N	W 48–31	48,532
October 12	5:00 p.m.	No. 15 Utah^{†}	Reser Stadium; Corvallis, OR	P12N	L 7–52	31,730
October 19	11:30 a.m.	at California	California Memorial Stadium; Berkeley, CA	P12N	W 21–17	42,064
November 2	1:30 p.m.	at Arizona	Arizona Stadium; Tucson, AZ	P12N	W 56–38	36,939
November 8	7:30 p.m.	Washington	Reser Stadium; Corvallis, OR	FS1	L 7–19	34,244
November 16	4:30 p.m.	Arizona State	Reser Stadium; Corvallis, OR	FS1	W 35–34	30,980
November 23	6:00 p.m.	at Washington State	Martin Stadium; Pullman, WA	P12N	L 53–54	22,016
November 30	1:00 p.m.	at No. 14 Oregon	Autzen Stadium; Eugene, OR (Civil War)	P12N	L 10–24	56,243
*Non-conference game; ^{†}Homecoming; Rankings from AP Poll and CFP Rankings after November 5 released prior to game; All times are in Pacific time

== Game summaries ==
=== Oklahoma State ===
overall records	first meeting
First meeting

Oklahoma State Cowboys (0–0) vs. Oregon State Beavers (0–0)

Quarter	1	2	3	4	Total
Oklahoma State	7	24	14	7	52
Oregon State	10	6	7	13	36

at Reser Stadium • Corvallis, Oregon

- Date: August 30, 2019
- Game time: 7:35 p.m. PDT
- Game weather: Temperature: 73 • Wind:SE2 (MPH) • Weather: Sunny
- Game attendance: 31,681
- Referee: Brad Van Vark
- TV announcers (FS1): Justin Kutcher (Play-By-Play), Petros Papadakis (Analysts) & Shane Vereen (Analysts)

Game information

First Quarter

- (13:06) ORST – Isaiah Hodgins 29-yard pass from Jake Luton, Jordan Choukair kick (Drive: 6 plays, 70 yards, 1:54; Oregon State 7–0)
- (9:13) OKST – Chuba Hubbard 6-yard run, Matt Ammendola kick (Drive: 9 plays, 70 yards, 3:53; Tied 7–7)
- (3:42) ORST – Jordan Choukair 30-yard field goal (Drive: 14 plays, 61 yards, 5:31; Oregon State 10–7)

Second Quarter

- (13:33) OKST – Matt Ammendola 23-yard field goal (Drive: 14 plays, 71 yards, 5:09; Tied 10–10)
- (9:41) OKST – LD Brown 5-yard run, Matt Ammendola kick (Drive: 7 plays, 86 yards, 2:34; Oklahoma State 17–10)
- (6:45) OKST – Tylan Wallace 36-yard pass from Spencer Sanders, Matt Ammendola kick (Drive: 5 plays, 51 yards, 1:51; Oklahoma State 24–10)
- (2:02) OKST – Tylan Wallace 21-yard pass from Spencer Sanders, Matt Ammendola kick (Drive: 8 plays, 80 yards, 3:14; Oklahoma State 31–10)
- (0:03) ORST – Tyjon Lindsey 1-yard pass from Jake Luton (Drive: 14 plays, 75 yards, 1:59; Oklahoma State 31–16)

Third Quarter

- (12:20) OKST – Chuba Hubbard 2-yard run, Matt Ammendola kick (Drive: 10 plays, 70 yards, 2:40; Oklahoma State 38–16)
- (9:50) ORST – Isaiah Hodgins 9-yard pass from Jake Luton, Jordan Choukair kick (Drive: 6 plays, 73 yards, 2:30; Oklahoma State 38–23)
- (7:54) OKST – Chuba Hubbard 53-yard run, Matt Ammendola kick (Drive: 6 plays, 75 yards, 1:56; Oklahoma State 45–23)

Fourth Quarter

- (13:08) ORST – Jack Colletto 1-yard run (Drive: 14 plays, 64 yards, 5:16; Oklahoma State 45–29)
- (9:39) OKST – C. J. Moore 11-yard pass from Spencer Sanders, Matt Ammendola kick (Drive: 8 plays, 75 yards, 3:29; Oklahoma State 52–29)
- (1:19) ORST – Kolby Taylor 5-yard pass from Tristan Gebbia, Jordan Choukair kick (Drive: 11 plays, 80 yards, 2:41; Oklahoma State 52–36)

Statistics	OKST	OSU
First downs	30	26
Total yards	555	448
Rushes/yards	52–352	37–167
Passing yards	203	281
Passing: Comp–Att–Int	19–24–0	26–49–0
Time of possession	30:24	29:36

Team	Category	Player	Statistics
Oklahoma State	Passing	Spencer Sanders	19/24, 203 yards, 3 TD
Oklahoma State	Rushing	Chuba Hubbard	26 carries, 221 yards, 3 TD
Oklahoma State	Receiving	Tylan Wallace	5 receptions, 92 yards, 2 TD
Oregon State	Passing	Jake Luton	23/42, 251 yards, 3 TD
Oregon State	Rushing	Jermar Jefferson	16 carries, 87 yards
Oregon State	Receiving	Isaiah Hodgins	9 receptions, 170 yards, 2 TD

=== At Hawaii ===
Oregon State Beavers at Hawaii Rainbow Warriors

Quarter	1	2	3	4	Total
Beavers	14	14	0	0	28
Rainbow Warriors	7	14	7	3	31

at Aloha Stadium, Honolulu, HI

- Date: September 7, 2019
- Game time: 9:00 p.m. PST
- Game weather: Temperature: 86 °F (30 °C) • Wind: NE 17 mph • Weather: 57% Humidity
- Game attendance: 26,807
- Referee: Kevin Mar
- TV announcers (SPEC HI / Stadium): Robert Kekaula (play-by-play), Rich Miano (analyst), & Scott Robbs (sideline)
- ESPN – Ward, Meskell's late FG help Hawaii beat Oregon State 31–28

Game information

First Quarter

- (07:44) OSU TD – Jermar Jefferson 4-yard run, Jordan Choukair kick
  Drive: 6 plays, 71 yards, 2:24; Oregon State 7–0
- (06:54) HAW TD – JoJo Ward 29-yard pass from Cole McDonald, Ryan Meskell kick
  Drive: 2 plays, 35 yards, 0:41; Tied 7–7
- (04:12) OSU TD – Artavis Pierce 37-yard run, Jordan Choukair kick
  Drive: 6 plays, 60 yards, 2:33; Oregon State 14–7

Second Quarter

- (12:42) OSU TD – Isaiah Hodgins 13-yard pass from Jake Luton, Jordan Choukair kick
  Drive: 12 plays, 66 yards, 5:06; Oregon State 21–7
- (11:00) HAW TD – JoJo Ward 35-yard pass from Cole McDonald, Ryan Meskell kick
  Drive: 5 plays, 75 yards, 1:42; Oregon State 21–14
- (02:25) OSU TD – Artavis Pierce 25-yard run, Jordan Choukair kick
  Drive: 6 plays, 85 yards, 2:17; Oregon State 28–14
- (00:12) HAW TD – JoJo Ward 5-yard pass from Cole McDonald, Ryan Meskell kick
  Drive: 11 plays, 70 yards, 2:07; Oregon State 28–21

Third Quarter

- (07:05) HAW TD – JoJo Ward 29-yard pass from Cole McDonald, Ryan Meskell kick
  Drive: 4 plays, 80 yards, 1:44; Tied 28–28

Fourth Quarter

- (02:17) HAW FG – Ryan Meskell 28-yard field goal
  Drive: 6 plays, 24 yards, 2:01; Hawaii 31–28

Passing

- OSU – Jake Luton: 15/32, 169 yards, 1 TD
- HAW – Cole McDonald: 30/52, 421 yards, 4 TD, 1 INT

Rushing

- OSU – Jermar Jefferson: 31 carries, 183 yards, 1 TD
- HAW – Miles Reed: 11 carries, 42 yards

Receiving

- OSU – Isaiah Hodgins: 7 receptions, 96 yards, 1 TD
- HAW – JoJo Ward: 10 receptions, 189 yards, 4 TD

=== Cal Poly ===
	1	2	3	4	Total
Mustangs	7	0	0	0	7
Beavers	21	17	7	0	45

=== Stanford ===
	1	2	3	4	Total
Cardinal	7	7	7	10	31
Beavers	0	0	7	21	28

=== At UCLA ===
	1	2	3	4	Total
Beavers	21	6	14	7	48
Bruins	0	10	14	7	31

=== Utah ===
	1	2	3	4	Total
No. 15 Utes	21	14	14	3	52
Beavers	0	0	0	7	7

=== At California ===
	1	2	3	4	Total
Beavers	7	7	0	7	21
Golden Bears	0	3	14	0	17

=== At Arizona ===
Oregon State Beavers (3–4) vs Arizona Wildcats (4–4) – Game summary

Quarter	1	2	3	4	Total
Beavers	7	28	7	14	56
Wildcats	6	13	12	7	38

at Arizona Stadium • Tucson, AZ

- Date: November 2, 2019
- Game time: 1:30 P.M.
- Game weather: Mostly Sunny, 86 °F (30 °C)
- Game attendance: 36,939
- Referee: Michael Mothershed
- TV announcers (Pac-12 Network): Roxy Bernstein (play by play), Anthony Herron (analyst), Jill Savage (sideline reporter)

Game information

First quarter

- (11:28) OSU – Isaiah Hodgins 21-yard pass from Jake Luton, Everett Hayes kick (Drive: 9 plays, 75 yards, 3:32; Oregon State 7–0)
- (6:18) ARIZ – Lucas Havrisik 23-yard field goal (Drive: 14 plays, 70 yards, 5:04; Oregon State 7–3)
- (2:33) ARIZ – Lucas Havrisik 27-yard field goal (Drive: 7 plays, 50 yards, 2:47; Oregon State 7–6)

Second quarter

- (14:04) OSU – Jermar Jefferson 1-yard run, Everett Hayes kick (Drive: 10 plays, 75 yards, 3:29; Oregon State 14–6)
- (13:03) ARIZ – Gary Brightwell 38-yard pass from Grant Gunnell, two-point pass failed (Drive: 3 plays, 75 yards, 1:01; Oregon State 14–12)
- (9:02) OSU – Jermar Jefferson 5-yard run, Everett Hayes kick (Drive: 8 plays, 75 yards, 4:01; Oregon State 21–12)
- (5:41) ARIZ – J.J. Taylor 3-yard run, Lucas Havrisik kick (Drive: 9 plays, 75 yards, 3:21; Oregon State 21–19)
- (2:31) OSU – Artavis Pierce 4-yard run, Everett Hayes kick (Drive: 6 plays, 75 yards, 3:10; Oregon State 28–19)
- (0:04) OSU – Noah Togiai 23-yard pass from Jake Luton, Everett Hayes kick (Drive: 7 plays, 92 yards, 0:54; Oregon State 35–19)

Third quarter

- (10:33) OSU – Jermar Jefferson 5-yard run, Everett Hayes kick (Drive: 7 plays, 65 yards, 3:16; Oregon State 42–19)
- (8:42) ARIZ – Cedric Peterson 35-yard pass from Grant Gunnell, two-point pass failed (Drive: 6 plays, 75 yards, 1:51; Oregon State 42–25)
- (3:20) ARIZ – Gary Brightwell 10-yard run, kick failed (Drive: 10 plays, 55 yards, 3:33; Oregon State 42–31)

Fourth quarter

- (7:58) OSU – Isaiah Hodgins 25-yard pass from Jake Luton, Everett Hayes kick (Drive: 7 plays, 79 yards, 3:18; Oregon State 49–31)
- (4:11) ARIZ – J.J. Taylor 2-yard run, Lucas Havrisik kick (Drive: 12 plays, 75 yards, 3:47; Oregon State 49–38)
- (2:15) OSU – Tyjon Lindsey 24-yard run, Everett Hayes kick (Drive: 3 plays, 38 yards, 1:56; Oregon State 56–38)

Statistics	OSU	ARIZ
First downs	31	33
Total yards	572	526
Rushing yards	42–244	47–148
Passing yards	328	378
Passing: Comp–Att–Int	20–26–0	26–41–0
Time of possession	29:35	30:25

Team	Category	Player	Statistics
Oregon State	Passing	Jake Luton	20/26, 328 yards, 3 TD
Oregon State	Rushing	Artavis Pierce	15 carries, 114 yards, TD
Oregon State	Receiving	Isaiah Hodgins	7 receptions, 150 yards, 2 TD
Arizona	Passing	Grant Gunnell	19/29, 269 yards, 2 TD
Arizona	Rushing	J. J. Taylor	21 carries, 78 yards, 2 TD
Arizona	Receiving	J.J. Taylor	7 receptions, 89 yards

=== Washington ===
Washington Huskies (5–4) at Oregon State Beavers (4–4)

Quarter	1	2	3	4	Total
Huskies	3	7	9	0	19
Beavers	0	0	7	0	7

at Reser Stadium • Corvallis, OR

- Date: November 8, 2019
- Game time: 7:30 p.m. PST
- Game attendance: 34,244
- TV: FS1

Game information

Top passers

- OSU – Jake Luton – 19-28, 88 yards, 1 INT
- UW – Jacob Eason – 16-32, 175 yards, 2 INT

Top rushers

- OSU – Jermar Jefferson – 9 carries, 39 yards
- UW – Salvon Ahmed – 25 carries, 174 yards, 2 TD

Top receiving

- OSU – Isaiah Hodgins – 4 receptions, 33 yards
- UW – Hunter Bryant – 5 receptions, 90 yards

=== Arizona State ===
Arizona State Sun Devils (5–4) at Oregon State Beavers (4–5) – Game summary

Quarter	1	2	3	4	Total
Sun Devils	14	7	7	6	34
Beavers	14	14	7	0	35

at Reser Stadium • Corvallis, OR

- Date: November 16, 2019
- Game time: 4:30 p.m. PST
- Game weather: Cloudy, 54 °F (12 °C)
- Game attendance: 30,980
- Referee: Francisco Villar
- TV announcers (FS1): Aaron Goldsmith (play-by-play), Jordan Palmer (analyst)

Game information

First quarter

- (11:40) OSU – Jesiah Irish 24-yard pass from Jake Luton, Everett Hayes kick (Drive: 8 plays, 80 yards, 3:20; Oregon State 7–0)
- (5:35) ASU – Eno Benjamin 2-yard run, Cristian Zendejas kick (Drive: 8 plays, 54 yards, 2:31; Tied 7–7)
- (2:00) OSU – Trevon Bradford 5-yard pass from Jake Luton, Everett Hayes kick (Drive: 9 plays, 74 yards, 3:29; Oregon State 14–7)
- (0:20) ASU – Frank Darby 24-yard pass from Jayden Daniels, Cristian Zendejas kick (Drive: 4 plays, 56 yards, 1:32; Tied 14–14)

Second quarter

- (9:58) OSU – Isaiah Hodgins 5-yard pass from Jake Luton, Everett Hayes kick (Drive: 10 plays, 74 yards, 5:15; Oregon State 21–14)
- (4:01) ASU – Brandon Aiyuk 63-yard punt return, Cristian Zendejas kick (Tied 21–21)
- (0:33) OSU – Jermar Jefferson 4-yard run, Everett Hayes kick (Drive: 8 plays, 72 yards, 3:22; Oregon State 28–21)

Third quarter

- (4:14) OSU – Noah Togiai 12-yard pass from Jake Luton, Everett Hayes kick (Drive: 5 plays, 28 yards, 2:40; Oregon State 35–21)
- (2:19) ASU – Kyle Williams 8-yard pass from Jayden Daniels, Cristian Zendejas kick (Drive: 6 plays, 82 yards, 1:49; Oregon State 35–28)

Fourth quarter

- (1:40) ASU – Brandon Aiyuk 12-yard pass from Jayden Daniels, two-point pass failed (Drive: 11 plays, 90 yards, 4:39; Oregon State 35–34)

Statistics	ASU	OSU
First downs	19	26
Total yards	408	393
Rushing yards	25–74	39–105
Passing yards	334	288
Passing: Comp–Att–Int	24–36–0	26–35–0
Time of possession	25:14	34:46

Team	Category	Player	Statistics
Arizona State	Passing	Jayden Daniels	24/36, 334 yards, 3 TD
Arizona State	Rushing	Eno Benjamin	15 carries, 70 yards, TD
Arizona State	Receiving	Brandon Aiyuk	10 receptions, 173 yards, TD
Oregon State	Passing	Jake Luton	26/35, 288 yards, 4 TD
Oregon State	Rushing	Artavis Pierce	16 carries, 63 yards
Oregon State	Receiving	Isaiah Hodgins	6 receptions, 93 yards, TD

=== At Washington State ===
Oregon State Beavers (5–5) at Washington State Cougars (5–5)

Quarter	1	2	3	4	Total
Oregon St	7	17	0	29	53
Washington St	7	14	14	19	54

at Martin Stadium, Pullman, Washington

- Date: November 23, 2019
- Game time: 6:00 p.m. PST
- Game weather: Partly cloudy, 38 °F (3 °C)
- Game attendance: 22,016
- Referee: Kevin Mar
- TV: Pac-12 Network
- Box Score

Game information

First quarter

- OSU – Jermar Jefferson 54-yard run (Everett Hayes kick), 9:16. Oregon St 7–0. Drive: 5 plays, 99 yards, 1:57.
- WSU – Dezmon Patmon 12-yard pass from Anthony Gordon (Blake Mazza kick), 2:17. Tie 7–7. Drive: 8 plays, 62 yards, 2:51.

Second quarter

- OSU – Champ Fleming 46-yard pass from Jake Luton (Everett Hayes kick), 12:38. Oregon St 14–7. Drive: 4 plays, 69 yards, 2:06.
- WSU – Renard Bell 10-yard pass from Anthony Gordon (Blake Mazza kick), 9:24. Tie 14–14. Drive: 7 plays, 75 yards, 3:14.
- WSU – Deon McIntosh 33-yard pass from Anthony Gordon (Blake Mazza kick), 4:51. Washington St 21–14. Drive: 4 plays, 73 yards, 2:12.
- OSU – Noah Togiai 18-yard pass from Jake Luton (Everett Hayes kick), 2:20. Tie 21–21. Drive: 7 plays, 75 yards, 2:31.
- OSU – Everett Hayes 47-yard field goal, 0:26. Oregon St 24–21. Drive: 6 plays, 23 yards, 0:42.

Third quarter

- WSU – Calvin Jackson 36-yard pass from Anthony Gordon (Blake Mazza kick), 8:06. Washington St 28–24. Drive: 4 plays, 58 yards, 1:29.
- WSU – Renard Bell 10-yard pass from Anthony Gordon (Blake Mazza kick), 1:44. Washington St 35–24. Drive: 9 plays, 82 yards, 4:56.

Fourth quarter

- OSU – Teagan Quitoriano 28-yard pass from Jake Luton (run good), 13:42. Washington St 35–32. Drive: 8 plays, 75 yards, 3:02.
- WSU – Max Borghi 1-yard run (Blake Mazza kick), 9:52. Washington St 42–32. Drive: 8 plays, 75 yards, 3:50.
- OSU – Jermar Jefferson 5-yard run (Everett Hayes kick), 7:32. Washington St 42–39. Drive: 6 plays, 69 yards, 2:22.
- OSU – Jermar Jefferson 39-yard pass from Jake Luton (Everett Hayes kick), 6:45. Oregon St 46–42. Drive: 3 plays, 51 yards, 0:45.
- OSU – Jermar Jefferson 2-yard pass from Jake Luton (Everett Hayes kick), 4:17. Oregon St 53–42. Drive: 5 plays, 27 yards, 2:19.
- WSU – Dezmon Patmon 14-yard pass from Anthony Gordon (pass failed), 2:10. Oregon St 53–48. Drive: 7 plays, 75 yards, 2:07.
- WSU – Max Borghi 2-yard run (run failed), 0:02. Washington St 54–53. Drive: 10 plays, 58 yards, 1:08.

Top passers

- OSU – Jake Luton – 22/40, 408 yards, 5 TD, INT
- WSU – Anthony Gordon – 50/68, 606 yards, 6 TD, 3 INT

Top rushers

- OSU – Jermar Jefferson – 21 rushes, 132 yards, 2 TD
- WSU – Max Borghi – 10 rushes, 44 yards, 2 TD

Top receivers

- OSU – Champ Fleming – 4 receptions, 110 yards, TD
- WSU – Renard Bell – 8 receptions, 108 yards, 2 TD

=== At No. 14 Oregon ===
Oregon State Beavers vs. Oregon Ducks – Game summary

Quarter	1	2	3	4	Total
Beavers	3	0	0	7	10
No. 14 Ducks	10	7	0	7	24

at Autzen Stadium • Eugene, Oregon

- Date: November 30, 2019
- Game time: 1:00 pm
- Game attendance: 56,243
- TV: Pac-12 Network

Game information

First quarter

- ORE – Camden Lewis 32 Yd Field Goal, 8:26. Oregon 3–0. Drive: 16 plays, 56 yards, 6:34.
- OSU – Everett Hayes 40 Yd Field Goal, 3:00. Tied 3–3. Drive: 12 plays, 63 yards, 5:26.
- ORE – Mykael Wright 98 Yd Kickoff Return (Camden Lewis Kick), 2:47. Oregon 10–3. Drive: 0 plays, 0 yards, 0:00.

Second quarter

- ORE – Johnny Johnson III 28 Yd pass from Justin Herbert (Camden Lewis Kick), 12:55. Oregon 17–3. Drive: 2 plays, 39 yards, 0:32.

Third quarter

- No scoring plays.

Fourth quarter

- OSU – Jermar Jefferson 19 Yd Run (Everett Hayes Kick), 11:03. Oregon 17–10. Drive: 11 plays, 87 yards, 4:50.
- ORE – Cyrus Habibi-Likio 20 Yd Run (Camden Lewis Kick), 1:15. Oregon 24–10. Drive: 3 plays, 27 yards, 0:52.

Top passers

- OSU – Tristan Gebbia – 26–40, 243 yards
- ORE – Justin Herbert – 18–30, 174 yards, 1 TD

Top rushers

- OSU – Jermar Jefferson – 20 carries, 81 yards, 1 TD
- ORE – Travis Dye – 12 carries, 91 yards

Top receivers

- OSU – Isaiah Hodgins – 8 receptions, 85 yards
- ORE – Johnny Johnson III – 4 receptions, 39 yards, 1 TD

== Players drafted into the NFL ==
Round	Pick	Player	Position	NFL Club
6	189	Jake Luton	QB	Jacksonville Jaguars
6	203	Blake Brandel	OT	Minnesota Vikings
6	207	Isaiah Hodgins	WR	Buffalo Bills
