= Verdelle =

Verdelle is both a given name and a surname. Notable people with the name include:

- A.J. Verdelle (born 1960), American novelist
- Verdelle Smith (fl. 1960s), American singer

== See also ==
- Verdell (disambiguation)
