= 2019 Pac-12 Football Championship Game =

- Conference Championship
Utah Utes	Oregon Ducks
(11–1)	(10–2)
15	37
Head coach: Kyle Whittingham	Head coach: Mario Cristobal
AP / Coaches / CFP; 5 / 5 / 5	AP / Coaches / CFP; 13 / 13 / 13
	1	2	3	4	Total
Utah	0	0	15	0	15
Oregon	10	10	3	14	37
- Date: December 6, 2019
- Season: 2019
- Stadium: Levi's Stadium
- Location: Santa Clara, CA
- MVP: C. J. Verdell
- Favorite: Utah by 6.5
- Referee: Steve Strimling
- Attendance: 38,679

United States TV coverage
- Network: ABC; ESPN Radio
- Announcers: Chris Fowler (play-by-play), Kirk Herbstreit (analyst), Molly McGrath (sideline) (ABC); Sean Kelley (play-by-play), Barrett Jones (analyst), Ian Fitzsimmons (sideline) (ESPN Radio)

2019 Pac-12 Conference football standings
	Conf.			Overall
Team	W		L	W		L
North Division
No. 5 Oregon xy$	8	–	1	12	–	2
California	4	–	5	8	–	5
Washington	4	–	5	8	–	5
Oregon State	4	–	5	5	–	7
Washington State	3	–	6	6	–	7
Stanford	3	–	6	4	–	8
South Division
No. 16 Utah xy	8	–	1	11	–	3
USC	7	–	2	8	–	5
Arizona State	4	–	5	8	–	5
UCLA	4	–	5	4	–	8
Colorado	3	–	6	5	–	7
Arizona	2	–	7	4	–	8
Championship: Oregon 37, Utah 15
$ – Conference champion; x – Division champion/co-champions; y – Championship game participant; Rankings from AP Poll

The 2019 Pac-12 Football Championship Game was a college football game played on Friday, December 6, 2019, at Levi's Stadium in Santa Clara, California, to determine the 2019 champion of the Pac-12 Conference. The game featured the North division champions Oregon and the South division champions Utah, and was the conference's ninth championship game. This game was the last to be held at Levi's Stadium before the game moves to Allegiant Stadium in Las Vegas starting in 2020. With sponsorship by the 76 chain of gas stations, the game was officially called the 2019 Pac-12 Football Championship Game, presented by 76. Oregon won the game and the conference title by a score of 37–15.

== Previous season ==
The 2018 Pac-12 Football Championship Game featured North Division champion Washington against South Division champion Utah in the conference's 8th edition of the game. The Huskies won in the game's lowest total scoring, 10–3.

== Teams ==
The 2019 Pac–12 Football Championship Game was contested by the Oregon Ducks, North Division champions, and the Utah Utes, South Division Champions. Oregon and Utah had met 32 times previously before this game, with Oregon holding a 22–10 advantage in the series. The two teams did not meet during the 2019 regular season.

=== Oregon ===
Oregon clinched its spot in the Championship Game after its November 16 win over Arizona. This was Oregon's third overall appearance in the Championship Game, having won in their prior two appearances. This was Oregon's first appearance in the game since 2014, the year when the Ducks made their way into the first ever College Football Playoff and to the National Championship Game. Oregon had a 10–2 regular season record in 2019, and was 8–1 in Pac-12 play. The Ducks were designated as the home team, based on the two teams' record over their best common opponent, USC (Oregon won while Utah lost).

=== Utah ===
Utah secured its spot in the Championship Game with its November 30 win over Colorado. This was Utah's second appearance in the Championship Game, having also appeared the year prior. Utah entered the game with an 11–1 record, and 8–1 in Pac-12 play.

== Game summary ==
2019 Pac-12 Football Championship Game

Quarter	1	2	3	4	Total
No. 13 Oregon	10	10	3	14	37
No. 5 Utah	0	0	15	0	15

at Levi's Stadium • Santa Clara, California

- Date: Friday, December 6, 2019
- Game time: 8:00 p.m. EST (5:00 p.m. PST)
- Game attendance: 38,679
- Referee: Steve Strimling
- TV announcers (ABC): Chris Fowler (play-by-play), Kirk Herbstreit (analyst), Molly McGrath (sideline)
- ESPN game summary

Game information

First Quarter

- (8:00) ORE – C. J. Verdell 3 yard rush, Camden Lewis kick (Drive: 9 plays, 67 yards, 3:43; Oregon 7–0)
- (4:17) ORE – Camden Lewis 23 yard field goal (Drive: 6 plays, 56 yards, 2:43; Oregon 10–0)

Second Quarter

- (11:02) ORE – Justin Herbert 45 yard pass to Johnny Johnson III, Camden Lewis kick (Drive: 3 plays, 70 yards, 1:10; Oregon 17–0)
- (4:56) ORE – Camden Lewis 30 yard field goal (Drive: 10 plays, 57 yards, 4:03; Oregon 20–0)

Third Quarter

- (10:52) UTAH – Tyler Huntley 24 yard pass to Zack Moss, Jadon Redding kick (Drive: 6 plays, 53 yards, 2:27; Oregon 20–7)
- (4:56) ORE – Camden Lewis 25 yard field goal (Drive: 8 plays, 43 yards, 2:49; Oregon 23–7)
- (1:13) UTAH – Tyler Huntley 25 yard pass to Samson Nacua, 2-point pass good (Drive: 7 plays, 75 yards, 3:43; Oregon 23–15)

Fourth Quarter

- (7:09) ORE – C. J. Verdell 70 yard rush, Camden Lewis kick (Drive: 5 plays, 90 yards, 2:19; Oregon 30–15)
- (2:33) ORE – C. J. Verdell 31 yard rush, Camden Lewis kick (Drive: 2 plays, 35 yards, 0:49; Oregon 37–15)

=== Statistics ===
Statistics	ORE	UTAH
First downs	19	18
Plays–yards	67–432	64–309
Rushes–yards	41–239	35–116
Passing yards	193	193
Passing: comp–att–int	14–26–0	17–29–2
Time of possession	29:20	30:40

Team	Category	Player	Statistics
Oregon	Passing	Justin Herbert	14/26, 193 yards, 1 TD
Oregon	Rushing	C. J. Verdell	18 carries, 208 yards, 3 TD
Oregon	Receiving	Johnny Johnson III	6 receptions, 87 yards, 1 TD
Utah	Passing	Tyler Huntley	17/29, 193 yards, 2 TD, 2 INT
Utah	Rushing	Zack Moss	19 carries, 113 yards
Utah	Receiving	Zack Moss	4 receptions, 57 yards

Utah received the opening kickoff, but their first drive ended in a turnover on downs at the Oregon 33 yard line. Oregon scored on their first possession with a three-yard run by C. J. Verdell. They took a 10–0 lead on the next possession with a 23-yard field goal by Camden Lewis. Early in the second quarter, the Ducks extended the lead with a 45-yard touchdown pass from Justin Herbert to Johnny Johnson III. Camden Lewis converted another field goal, from 30 yards out, to make the score 20–0 Oregon at half-time.

Oregon received the second half kickoff, but was forced to punt after a three-and-out. On Utah's first possession, they scored their first points of the day via a 24-yard touchdown pass from Tyler Huntley to Zack Moss. Oregon added three points with a 25-yard field goal by Lewis. Late in the third quarter, Utah scored again with a 25-yard touchdown pass from Huntley to Samson Nacua, and converted a two-point conversion from Huntley to Nacua to make the score 23–15. In the fourth quarter, Oregon put the game out of reach with two long touchdown runs by C. J. Verdell, the first a 70-yard run, and the second a 31-yard run. Oregon wound down the remaining seconds to win by a score of 37–15.

C. J. Verdell ran for 208 yards and three touchdowns and was named game MVP.

== Aftermath ==
Oregon, who had been ranked 13th heading into the game, moved up to sixth in the final College Football Playoff rankings, and received a bid to the Rose Bowl against Big Ten runner-up Wisconsin, where they won 28–27. Utah moved down from fifth to 11th and received a bid to play Texas in the Alamo Bowl, where they lost 10–38.

== See also ==
- List of Pac-12 Conference football champions
