= 2020 Rose Bowl =

Postseason college football bowl game

2020 Rose Bowl presented by Northwestern Mutual
- CFP New Year's Six; 106th Rose Bowl Game
Oregon Ducks	Wisconsin Badgers
(11–2)	(10–3)
Pac-12	Big Ten
28	27
Head coach: Mario Cristobal	Head coach: Paul Chryst
AP / Coaches / CFP; 7 / 6 / 6	AP / Coaches / CFP; 11 / 11 / 8
	1	2	3	4	Total
Oregon	7	7	7	7	28
Wisconsin	10	7	7	3	27
- Date: January 1, 2020
- Season: 2019
- Stadium: Rose Bowl
- Location: Pasadena, California
- MVP: Justin Herbert (QB, Oregon) & Brady Breeze (S, Oregon)
- Favorite: Wisconsin by 3
- National anthem: Oregon Marching Band
- Referee: Brandon Cruse (Big 12)
- Halftime show: Oregon Marching Band and University of Wisconsin Marching Band
- Attendance: 90,462

United States TV coverage
- Network: ESPN and ESPN Radio
- Announcers: ESPN: Chris Fowler (play-by-play); Kirk Herbstreit (analyst); Maria Taylor and Tom Rinaldi (sidelines); ESPN Radio: Bob Wischusen, Dan Orlovsky, Allison Williams

International TV coverage
- Network: ESPN Deportes

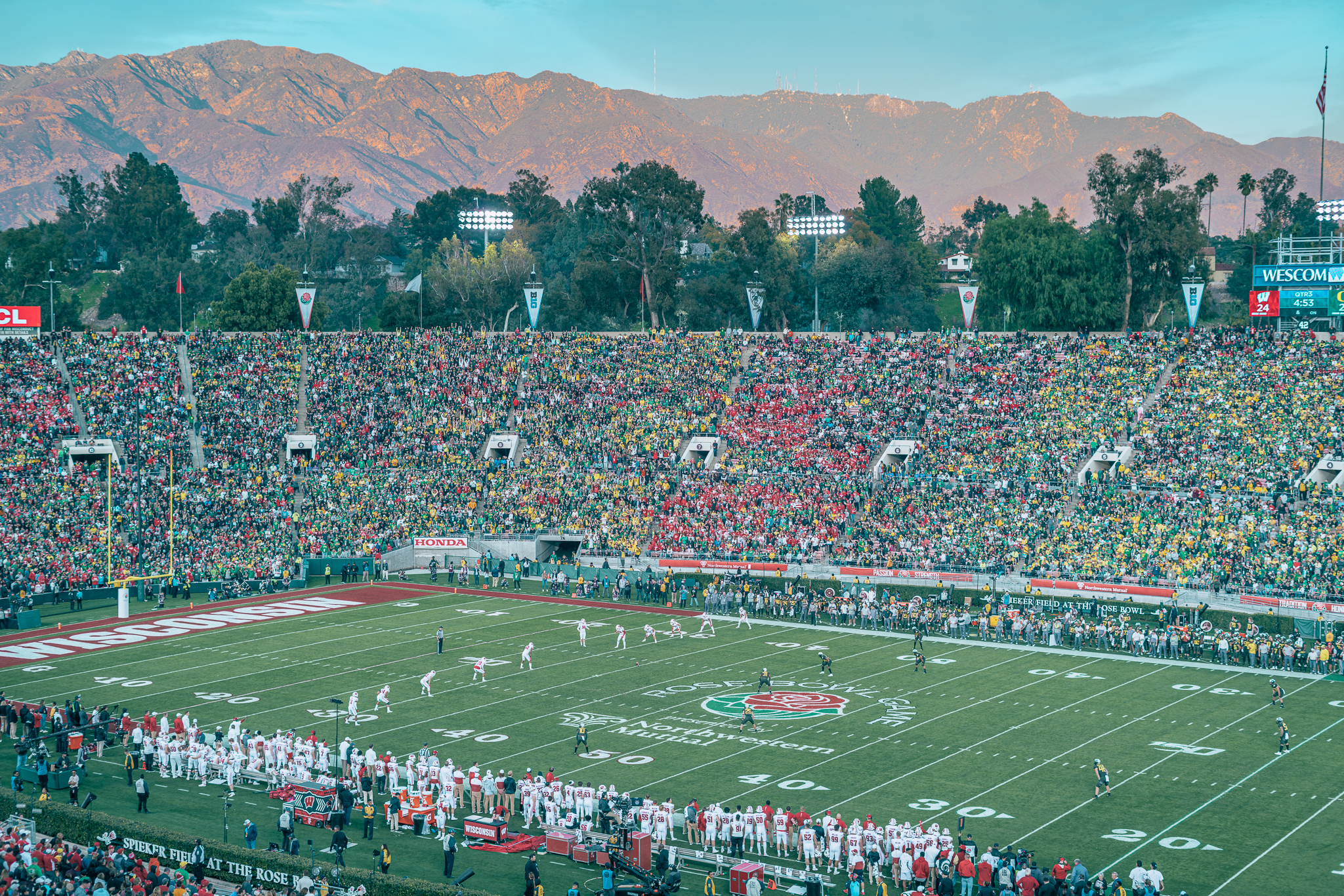
Kickoff of the 2020 Rose Bowl.

The 2020 Rose Bowl Game was a college football bowl game played on January 1, 2020, with kickoff at 5:00 p.m. EST (2:00 p.m. local PST) on ESPN. It was the 106th edition of the Rose Bowl Game, and one of the 2019–20 bowl games concluding the 2019 FBS football season. Sponsored by the Northwestern Mutual financial services organization, the game was officially known as the Rose Bowl Game presented by Northwestern Mutual, and was a rematch of the 2012 Rose Bowl, which Oregon also won. Wisconsin made it to their first Rose Bowl since 2013; the game marked the Badgers' fourth consecutive Rose Bowl loss, having lost three straight times from 2011 to 2013.

== Teams ==
The game matched Big Ten Conference runner-up Wisconsin and Pac-12 Conference champion Oregon. The 2012 Rose Bowl featured the same teams, won by Oregon, who scored 10 unanswered fourth-quarter points in a 45–38 victory.

=== Oregon Ducks ===
Oregon entered the game with an 11–2 record (8–1 in conference). They finished atop the Pac-12's North Division, then defeated Utah in the Pac-12 Championship Game to secure their spot in the Rose Bowl. Oregon was 2–1 against ranked FBS opponents, defeating Washington and Utah while losing to Auburn. The Ducks' only other loss was to Arizona State. This was Oregon's eighth Rose Bowl; they had a 3–4 record in prior appearances, last playing in the 2015 edition, which they won over Florida State.

=== Wisconsin Badgers ===
Wisconsin entered the game with a 10–3 record (7–2 in conference). They finished tied with Minnesota atop the Big Ten's West Division, and advanced to the Big Ten Championship Game due to their regular season win over Minnesota. In the Big Ten title game, the Badgers fell to Ohio State, 34–21. As Ohio State was selected for the College Football Playoff, Wisconsin received an invitation to the Rose Bowl. The Badgers were 3–2 against ranked opponents, defeating Michigan, Iowa, and Minnesota while losing to Ohio State twice. Their only other loss was to Illinois. This was Wisconsin's tenth Rose Bowl; they had a 3–6 record in prior appearances, last playing in the 2013 edition, which they lost to Stanford.

== Game summary ==
2020 Rose Bowl Game presented by Northwestern Mutual

Quarter	1	2	3	4	Total
No. 6 Oregon	7	7	7	7	28
No. 8 Wisconsin	10	7	7	3	27

at Rose Bowl • Pasadena, California

- Date: Wednesday, January 1, 2020
- Game time: 5:00 p.m. EST (2:00 p.m. PST)
- Game weather: Clear • Temperature: 66 °F (19 °C) • Wind: SW 5 mph
- Game attendance: 90,462
- Referee: Brandon Cruse
- TV announcers (ESPN): Chris Fowler (play-by-play), Kirk Herbstreit (analyst), Maria Taylor and Tom Rinaldi (sideline)
- ESPN game summary

Game information

First Quarter

- (9:53) ORE – Justin Herbert 4 yard rush, Camden Lewis kick (Drive: 12 plays, 75 yards, 5:07; Oregon 7–0)
- (9:41) WIS – Aron Cruickshank 95 yard kickoff return, Collin Larsh kick (Tied 7–7)
- (8:05) WIS – Collin Larsh 44 yard field goal (Drive: 4 plays, 1 yard, 1:30; Wisconsin 10–7)

Second Quarter

- (3:16) ORE – Justin Herbert 5 yard rush, Camden Lewis kick (Drive: 3 plays, 33 yards, 0:47; Oregon 14–10)
- (0:11) WIS – Jack Coan 11 yard pass to Quintez Cephus, Collin Larsh kick (Drive: 8 plays, 53 yards, 2:57; Wisconsin 17–14)

Third Quarter

- (11:57) ORE – Brady Breeze 31 yard fumble return, Camden Lewis kick (Oregon 21–17)
- (4:53) WIS – Mason Stokke 2 yard rush, Collin Larsh kick (Drive: 11 plays, 65 yard, 7:04; Wisconsin 24–21)

Fourth Quarter

- (12:09) WIS – Collin Larsh 27 yard field goal (Drive: 11 plays, 51 yard, 5:53; Wisconsin 27–21)
- (7:41) ORE – Justin Herbert 30 yard rush, Camden Lewis kick (Drive: 1 play, 30 yards, 0:10; Oregon 28–27)

=== Statistics ===
Statistics	ORE	WIS
First downs	13	18
Plays–yards	51–204	72–322
Rushes–yards	30–66	37–136
Passing yards	138	186
Passing: comp–att–int	14–21–1	23–35–1
Turnovers		
Time of possession	21:57	38:03

Team	Category	Player	Statistics
Oregon	Passing	Justin Herbert	14/20, 138 yards, 1 INT
Oregon	Rushing	C. J. Verdell	17 carries, 49 yards
Oregon	Receiving	Juwan Johnson	5 receptions, 66 yards
Wisconsin	Passing	Jack Coan	23/35, 186 yards, 1 TD, 1 INT
Wisconsin	Rushing	Jonathan Taylor	21 carries, 94 yards
Wisconsin	Receiving	Quintez Cephus	7 receptions, 59 yards, 1 TD

Some controversy arose from an offensive pass interference call that went against Wisconsin near the end of the game, which nullified a Wisconsin first down and eventually gave the ball back to Oregon, who was able to run the clock down and win the game. The call and its impact on the game led former NFL referee Terry McAulay to publicly disagree with the call.
