= Travis Dye =

American football player (born 1999)

Profile
- Position: Running back

Personal information
- Born: August 24, 1999 (age 27); Norco, California, U.S.
- Listed height: 5 ft 10 in (1.78 m)
- Listed weight: 200 lb (91 kg)

Career information
- High school: Norco
- College: Oregon (2018–2021); USC (2022)
- NFL draft: 2023: undrafted

Career history
- New York Jets (2023)*
- * Offseason or practice squad member only

Awards and highlights
- Second-team All-Pac-12 (2022)
- Stats at Pro Football Reference

Travis Dye (born August 24, 1999) is an American former professional football running back. He played college football for the Oregon Ducks and USC Trojans, and signed with the New York Jets after going unselected in the 2023 NFL draft.

== Early life ==
Dye attended Norco High School in Norco, California. As a senior, he was the Big VIII League Offensive Player of the Year after he had 2,383 rushing yards on 255 carries with 34 touchdowns. He committed to the University of Oregon to play college football.

== College career ==
Dye played at Oregon from 2018 to 2021. As a true freshman in 2018, he played in all 13 games with two starts as a backup to CJ Verdell. He rushed for 739 yards on 140 carries with four touchdowns. He was again Verdell's backup in 2019, rushing for 658 yards over 106 carries in 14 games and three starts. Dye appeared in all seven games with three starts in 2020 and had 443 rushing yards on 64 carries with a touchdown. He was Oregon's leading rusher his final year there in 2021, finishing with 1,271 yards over 211 carries with 16 touchdowns.

Prior to the 2022 season, Dye transferred to the University of Southern California (USC).

=== Statistics ===
Season	Team	Games		Rushing				Receiving				Kick returns			
Season	Team	GP	GS	Att	Yards	Avg	TD	Rec	Yards	Avg	TD	Att	Yards	Avg	TD
2018	Oregon	13	2	140	739	5.3	4	12	69	5.8	1	2	29	14.5	0
2019	Oregon	14	3	106	658	6.2	0	16	159	9.9	1	13	276	21.2	0
2020	Oregon	7	3	64	443	6.9	1	9	239	26.6	4	0	0	0.0	0
2021	Oregon	14	10	211	1,271	6.0	16	46	402	8.7	2	0	0	0.0	0
2022	USC	7	7	101	647	6.4	7	16	157	9.8	0	0	0	0.0	0
Career		55	25	622	3,758	6.0	28	99	1,026	10.4	8	15	305	20.3	0

== Professional career ==
Pre-draft measurables
Height	Weight	Arm length	Hand span	40-yard dash	10-yard split	20-yard split	Vertical jump	Broad jump	Bench press
5 ft 10 in (1.78 m)	201 lb (91 kg)	28 7/8 in (0.73 m)	9 1/4 in (0.23 m)	4.82 s	1.71 s	2.83 s	27.0 in (0.69 m)	8 ft 11 in (2.72 m)	16 reps

Dye was signed by the New York Jets as an undrafted free agent on May 5, 2023. He was waived by the Jets on August 29.

== Personal life ==
Dye's brothers, Troy and Tony, have played in the NFL. His father, Mark, played in Minor League Baseball.
