= 2019 Colorado Buffaloes football team =

American college football season

2019 Colorado Buffaloes football
- Conference: Pac-12 Conference
- South Division
- Record: 5–7 (3–6 Pac-12)
- Head coach: Mel Tucker (1st season)
- Offensive coordinator: Jay Johnson (1st season)
- Offensive scheme: Multiple
- Defensive coordinator: Tyson Summers (1st season)
- Base defense: 4–3
- Home stadium: Folsom Field

Uniform
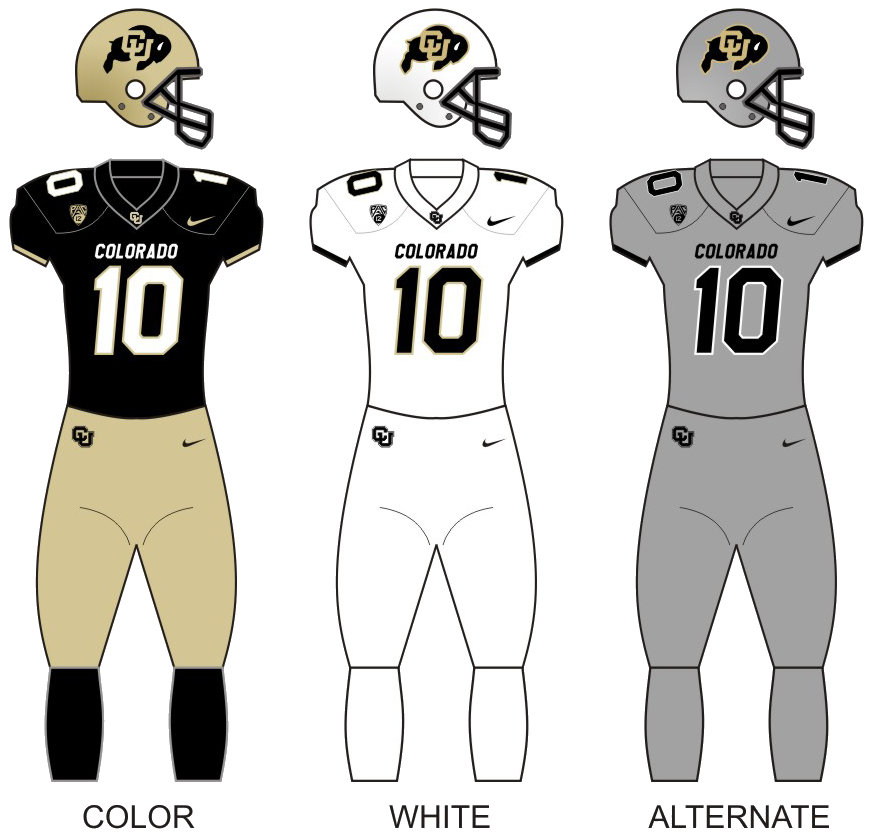

2019 Pac-12 Conference football standings
	Conf.			Overall
Team	W		L	W		L
North Division
No. 5 Oregon xy$	8	–	1	12	–	2
California	4	–	5	8	–	5
Washington	4	–	5	8	–	5
Oregon State	4	–	5	5	–	7
Washington State	3	–	6	6	–	7
Stanford	3	–	6	4	–	8
South Division
No. 16 Utah xy	8	–	1	11	–	3
USC	7	–	2	8	–	5
Arizona State	4	–	5	8	–	5
UCLA	4	–	5	4	–	8
Colorado	3	–	6	5	–	7
Arizona	2	–	7	4	–	8
Championship: Oregon 37, Utah 15
$ – Conference champion; x – Division champion/co-champions; y – Championship game participant; Rankings from AP Poll

The 2019 Colorado Buffaloes football team represented the University of Colorado in the Pac-12 Conference during the 2019 NCAA Division I FBS football season. Led by first-year head coach Mel Tucker, the Buffaloes played their home games on campus at Folsom Field in Boulder and finished at 5–7 (3–6 in Pac-12, fifth in the South Division).

Previously the defensive coordinator at Georgia, Tucker left after just one season at CU for Michigan State of the Big Ten Conference.

== Preseason ==
=== Pac-12 media days ===
==== Pac-12 media poll ====
In the 2019 Pac-12 preseason media poll, Colorado was voted to finish in last place in the South Division.

== Coaching staff ==
Name	Title
Mel Tucker	Head coach
Darrin Chiaverini	Assistant head coach/wide receivers coach
Jay Johnson	Offensive coordinator/ quarterbacks coach
Tyson Summers	Defensive coordinator/safeties coach
Jimmy Brumbaugh	Defensive line coach
Ross Els	Inside linebackers/special teams Coach
Darian Hagan	Running backs coach
Chris Kapilovic	Offensive line coach/Run Game Coordinator
Brian Michalowski	Outside linebackers coach
Al Pupunu	Tight ends coach
Travares Tillman	Defensive backs coach

== Schedule ==
Colorado's 2019 schedule began on Friday, August 30 with a non-conference neutral site game against in-state rival Colorado State in Denver. The Buffaloes would then play two more non-conference games at home, first against traditional Big Eight Conference rival Nebraska, now a member of the Big Ten Conference, and then against in-state foe Air Force, a member of the Mountain West Conference along with Colorado State. In Pac-12 Conference play, Colorado would play the other members of the South Division and draws Oregon, Stanford, Washington, and Washington State from the North Division. They will not play California or Oregon State as part of the regular season.

Date	Time	Opponent	Site	TV	Result	Attendance
August 30	8:00 p.m.	vs. Colorado State*	Empower Field at Mile High; Denver, CO (Rocky Mountain Showdown)	ESPN	W 52–31	66,997
September 7	1:30 p.m.	No. 25 Nebraska*	Folsom Field; Boulder, CO (rivalry)	FOX	W 34–31 ^{OT}	52,829
September 14	11:00 a.m.	Air Force*	Folsom Field; Boulder, CO	P12N	L 23–30 ^{OT}	49,282
September 21	8:00 p.m.	at No. 24 Arizona State	Sun Devil Stadium; Tempe, AZ	P12N	W 34–31	45,786
October 5	2:30 p.m.	Arizona	Folsom Field; Boulder, CO	P12N	L 30–35	52,569
October 11	8:00 p.m.	at No. 13 Oregon	Autzen Stadium; Eugene, OR	FS1	L 3–45	50,521
October 19	5:00 p.m.	at Washington State	Martin Stadium; Pullman, WA	ESPNU	L 10–41	28,514
October 25	7:00 p.m.	USC	Folsom Field; Boulder, CO	ESPN2	L 31–35	48,913
November 2	7:00 p.m.	at UCLA	Rose Bowl; Pasadena, CA	P12N	L 14–31	47,118
November 9	1:00 p.m.	Stanford^{†}	Folsom Field; Boulder, CO	P12N	W 16–13	49,224
November 23	8:00 p.m.	Washington	Folsom Field; Boulder, CO	ESPN	W 20–14	44,618
November 30	5:30 p.m.	at No. 6 Utah	Rice–Eccles Stadium; Salt Lake City, UT (Rumble in the Rockies)	ABC	L 15–45	46,879
*Non-conference game; ^{†}Homecoming; Rankings from AP Poll and CFP Rankings after November 5 released prior to game; All times are in Mountain time

== Game summaries ==
=== Vs. Colorado State ===
	1	2	3	4	Total
Rams	7	14	3	7	31
Buffaloes	7	17	14	14	52

=== Nebraska ===
	1	2	3	4	OT	Total
No. 25 Cornhuskers	7	10	0	14	0	31
Buffaloes	0	0	7	24	3	34

=== Air Force ===
	1	2	3	4	OT	Total
Falcons	6	14	0	3	7	30
Buffaloes	10	0	0	13	0	23

=== At Arizona State ===
	1	2	3	4	Total
Buffaloes	14	10	7	3	34
No. 24 Sun Devils	0	21	3	7	31

=== Arizona ===
	1	2	3	4	Total
Wildcats	7	7	14	7	35
Buffaloes	3	17	7	3	30

=== At Oregon ===
	1	2	3	4	Total
Buffaloes	3	0	0	0	3
No. 13 Ducks	7	17	14	7	45

Scoring summary

Quarter	Time	Drive			Team	Scoring information	Score	
Quarter	Time	Plays	Yards	TOP	Team	Scoring information	Colorado	Oregon
1	11:37	9	75	3:23	Oregon	Jacob Breeland 7-yard touchdown reception from Justin Herbert, Camden Lewis kick good	0	7
1	2:46	13	72	4:47	Colorado	27-yard field goal by James Stefanou	3	7
2	14:10	11	62	3:36	Oregon	32-yard field goal by Camden Lewis	3	10
2	7:39	7	69	2:42	Oregon	Cyrus Habibi-Likio 1-yard touchdown run, Camden Lewis kick good	3	17
2	0:20	8	80	1:07	Oregon	Jaylon Redd 3-yard touchdown run, Camden Lewis kick good	3	24
3	12:54	5	40	1:23	Oregon	Jaylon Redd 13-yard touchdown reception from Justin Herbert, Camden Lewis kick good	3	31
3	10:40	1	7	0:04	Oregon	Cyrus Habibi-Likio 3-yard touchdown run, Camden Lewis kick good	3	38
4	14:36	6	85	2:17	Oregon	Cyrus Habibi-Likio 1-yard touchdown run, Camden Lewis kick good	3	45
"TOP" = time of possession. For other American football terms, see Glossary of American football.							3	45

=== At Washington State ===
	1	2	3	4	Total
Buffaloes	3	0	7	0	10
Cougars	21	3	7	10	41

=== USC ===
USC Trojans at Colorado Buffaloes

Quarter	1	2	3	4	Total
Trojans	7	7	7	14	35
Buffaloes	3	14	14	0	31

at Folsom Field, Boulder, Colorado

- Date: October 25, 2019
- Game time: 7:00 p.m. MST
- Game attendance: 48,913
- TV: ESPN2

Game information

First quarter

- USC (14:01) – #8 Amon-Ra St. Brown 37 yard run TD
  (#40 Chase McGrath kick) – USC 7–0
- COL (9:04) – #48 James Stefanou 22 yard Field Goal – USC 7–3

Second quarter

- COL (14:55) – #12 Steven Montez to #3 K.D. Nixon 7 yard pass TD
  (#48 James Stefanou kick) – COL 10–7
- COL (5:52) – #12 Steven Montez to #3 K.D. Nixon 7 yard pass TD
  (#48 James Stefanou kick) – COL 17–7
- USC (2:48) – #9 Kedon Slovis to #23 Kenan Christon 3 yard pass TD
  (#40 Chase McGrath kick) – COL 17–14

Third quarter

- COL (14:15) – #12 Steven Montez to #2 Laviska Shenault Jr. 71 yard pass TD
  (#48 James Stefanou kick) – COL 24–14
- USC (12:15) – #9 Kedon Slovis to #21 Tyler Vaughns 21 yard pass TD
  (#40 Chase McGrath kick) – COL 24–21
- COL (9:16) – #12 Steven Montez 17 yard run TD
  (#48 James Stefanou kick) – COL 31–21

Fourth quarter

- USC (11:25) – #9 Kedon Slovis to #6 Michael Pittman Jr. 44 yard pass TD
  (#40 Chase McGrath kick) – COL 31–28
- USC (2:15) – #9 Kedon Slovis to #6 Michael Pittman Jr. 37 yard pass TD
  (#40 Chase McGrath kick) – USC 35–31

Passing

- USC – #9 Kedon Slovis – 30/44 406 Yds – 4 TD 1 int
- COL – #12 Steven Montez – 27/43 324 Yds – 3 TD

Rushing

- USC – #23 Kenan Christon – 14 Runs 76 Yds
- COL – #8 Alex Fontenot – 16 Runs 57 Yds

Receiving

- USC – #6 Michael Pittman Jr. – 7 Rec 156 Yds – 2 TD
- COL – #2 Laviska Shenault – 9 Rec 172 Yds – 1 TD

=== At UCLA ===
	1	2	3	4	Total
Buffaloes	0	7	0	7	14
Bruins	17	0	7	7	31

=== Stanford ===
	1	2	3	4	Total
Cardinal	3	3	0	7	13
Buffaloes	7	3	0	6	16

=== Washington ===
Washington at Colorado – Game summary

Quarter	1	2	3	4	Total
Huskies	0	0	7	7	14
Buffaloes	3	10	7	0	20

at Folsom Field • Boulder, CO

- Date: November 23, 2019
- Game time: 7:00 p.m. PST
- Game attendance: 44,618
- TV: FOX

Game information

Top passers

- UW – Jacob Eason: 21/34, 206 yards, 1 touchdown, 1 interception
- CU – Steven Montez: 17/28, 223 yards, 1 touchdown

Top rushers

- UW – Richard Newton: 12 rushes, 32 yards, 1 touchdown
- CU – Alex Fontenot: 24 rushes, 105 yards, 1 touchdown

Top receiving

- UW – Hunter Bryant: 5 receptions, 82 yards
- CU – Laviska Shenault: 7 receptions, 100 yards, 1 touchdown

=== At Utah ===
	1	2	3	4	Total
Buffaloes	7	0	0	8	15
No. 6 Utes	0	17	14	14	45

== Players drafted into the NFL ==
Round	Pick	Player	Position	NFL club
2	42	Laviska Shenault	WR	Jacksonville Jaguars
3	103	Davion Taylor	OLB	Philadelphia Eagles
7	226	Arlington Hambright	OT	Chicago Bears
