= Verdell =

Verdell is a given name and surname. The name comes from the French vert, Spanish verde/verdal, Latin viride, meaning green and growing.

Notable people with the name include:

== Given name ==
- Verdell Jackson (born 1941), American educator, rancher and politician
- Verdell Mathis (1914–1998), American baseball player
- Verdell Primeaux (born 1966), American singer
- Verdell Smith (born 1963), American boxer

== Surname ==
- CJ Verdell (born 1999), American football running back
- Jackie Verdell (1937–1991), American gospel singer
- Tom Verdell (1905–1987), American football player and coach

== Fictional characters ==
- Verdell, a dog in the 1997 film As Good as It Gets
