= Jake Hanson (American football) =

American football player (born 1997)

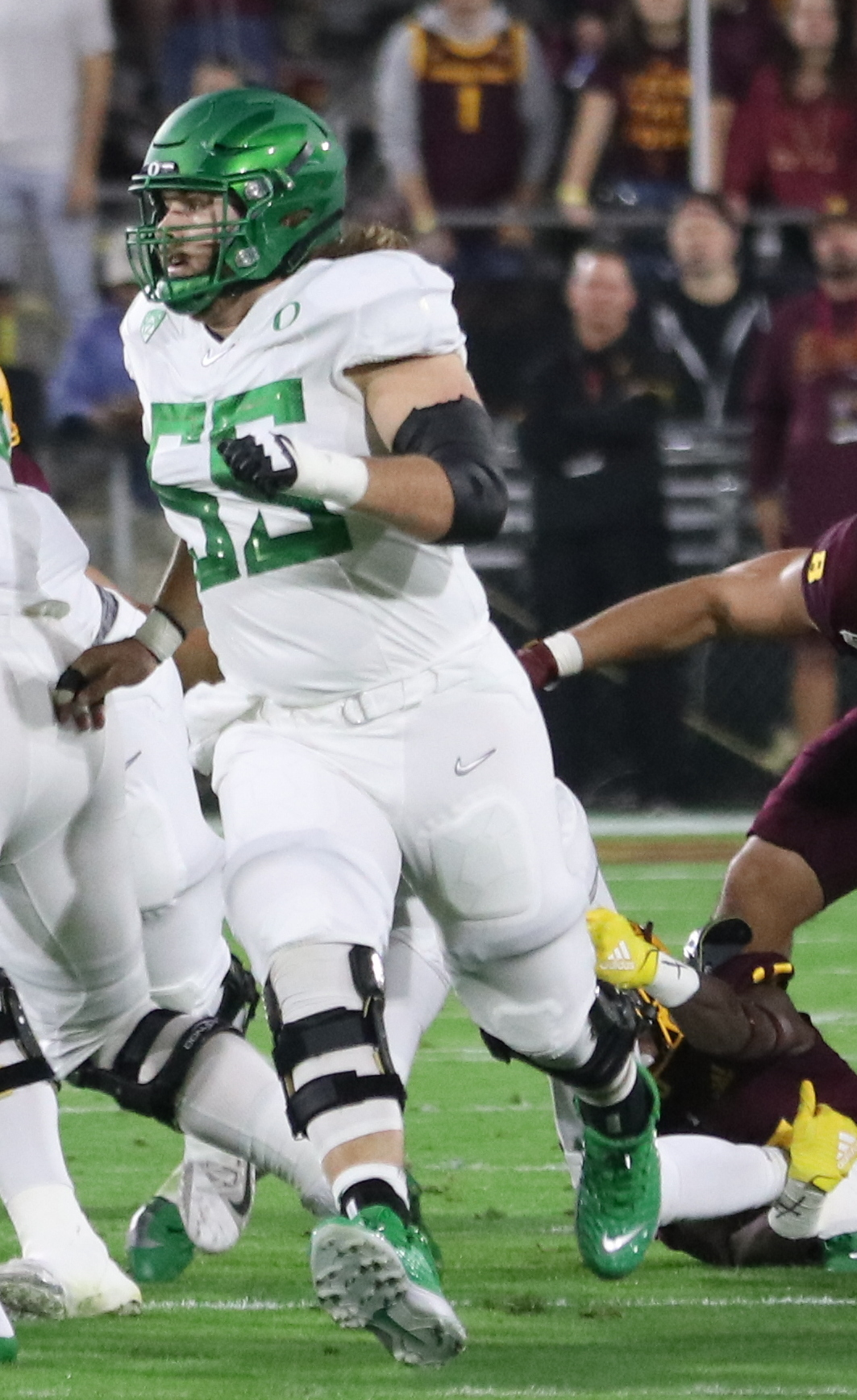
- Hanson with the Oregon Ducks in 2019

Profile
- Position: Center

Personal information
- Born: April 29, 1997 (age 29); Santa Clarita, California, U.S.
- Listed height: 6 ft 2 in (1.88 m)
- Listed weight: 296 lb (134 kg)

Career information
- High school: Eureka (Eureka, California)
- College: Oregon (2015–2019)
- NFL draft: 2020: 6th round, 208th overall pick

Career history
- Green Bay Packers (2020–2022); New York Jets (2023–2024); Atlanta Falcons (2025)*
- * Offseason or practice squad member only

Awards and highlights
- 2× Second-team All-Pac-12 (2018, 2019)

Career NFL statistics as of 2024
- Games played: 30
- Games started: 7
- Stats at Pro Football Reference

Jake Scott Hanson (born April 29, 1997) is an American professional football center. He played college football for the Oregon Ducks.

== College career ==
A 4-star recruit, Hanson committed to Oregon over offers from California, Oregon State, Utah, and Washington State, among others. Hanson started 49 games over his career, missing one start in 2018 due to a targeting penalty the week prior and two games in 2019 due to a concussion. He did not allow a sack through his first three seasons. Hanson was a two-time second-team all-Pac-12 Conference selection. During his senior season, he allowed two sacks and four quarterback hits, and was an anchor of Oregon's Joe Moore Award finalist offensive line.

== Professional career ==
Pre-draft measurables
Height	Weight	Arm length	Hand span	40-yard dash	10-yard split	20-yard split	Bench press
6 ft 4 3/8 in (1.94 m)	303 lb (137 kg)	32 3/4 in (0.83 m)	9 1/4 in (0.23 m)	5.50 s	1.95 s	3.21 s	33 reps
All values from NFL Combine

=== Green Bay Packers ===
Hanson was selected by the Green Bay Packers with the 208th overall pick in the sixth round of the 2020 NFL draft. He was signed on July 10, 2020. During training camp, Hanson had to adjust to working with a quarterback under center, as opposed to shotgun or pistol formations. He was waived on September 5, 2020, and was signed to the practice squad the next day. He was placed on the practice squad/injured list on October 13. On January 26, 2021, Hanson signed a reserves/futures contract with the Packers. He signed his tender offer from the Packers on April 18, 2022, to keep him with the team.

Hanson made his first NFL start on September 11, 2022, at guard, in a 23–7 loss to the Minnesota Vikings. On October 22, 2022, Hanson was placed on injured reserve.

On August 22, 2023, Hanson was waived/injured by the Packers.

=== New York Jets ===
On November 6, 2023, Hanson was signed to the New York Jets practice squad. He was signed to the active roster on December 9.

On August 27, 2024, Hanson was released by the Jets and re-signed to the practice squad. He was promoted to the active roster on September 9.

=== Atlanta Falcons ===
On August 10, 2025, Hanson signed with the Atlanta Falcons. He was placed on injured reserve on August 23, and released shortly after.
