= Austin Faoliu =

American football player (born 1999)

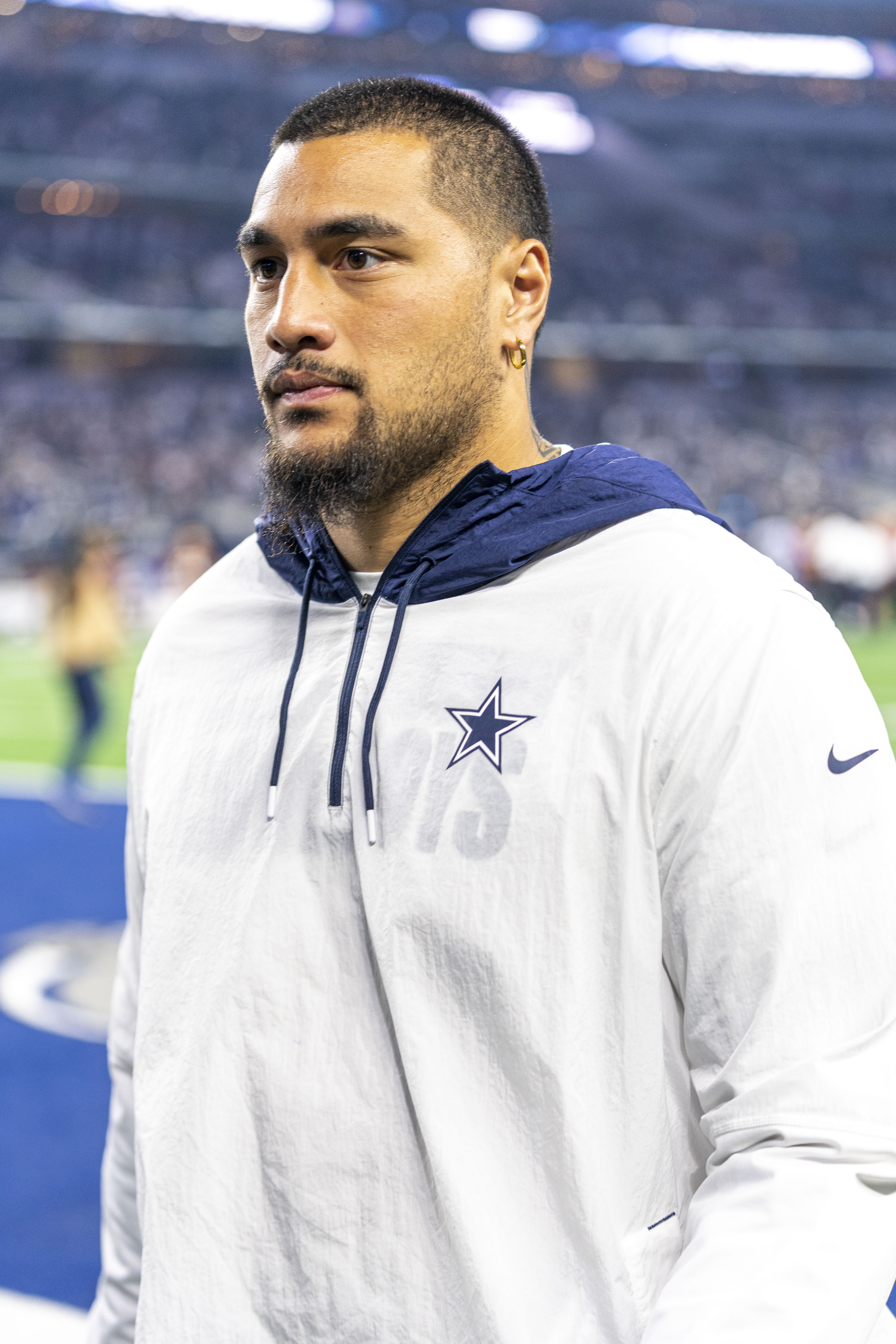
- Faoliu with the Cowboys in 2021

Profile
- Position: Nose tackle

Personal information
- Born: January 9, 1999 (age 27); Santa Ana, California, U.S.
- Listed height: 6 ft 3 in (1.91 m)
- Listed weight: 305 lb (138 kg)

Career information
- High school: Mater Dei (Santa Ana, California)
- College: Oregon
- NFL draft: 2021: undrafted

Career history
- Dallas Cowboys (2021); Seattle Sea Dragons (2023); Seattle Seahawks (2023); St. Louis Battlehawks (2024–2025)

Awards and highlights
- All-XFL Team (2023)

Career NFL statistics
- Total tackles: 3
- Stats at Pro Football Reference

Austin Faoliu (born January 9, 1999) is an American football nose tackle. He played college football at the University of Oregon.

== Early life ==
Faoliu attended Junípero Serra Catholic High School. As a sophomore, he had 48 carries for 351 yards and 4 touchdowns.

As a senior, he transferred to Mater Dei High School and was named a starter at nose guard. He tallied 32 tackles (9 for loss), 1.5 sacks and one forced fumble, while receiving All-County honors. He contributed to a second place in the CIF Southern Section Division 1.

== College career ==
Faoliu accepted a football scholarship from the University of Oregon. As a freshman, he appeared in 12 games, starting the first two contests. He posted 22 tackles (2.5 for loss) and one sack. He had 3 tackles, one sack and one forced fumble against the University of Arizona. He made 4 tackles against Boise State University.

As a sophomore, he appeared in 11 games with 6 starts. He totaled 44 tackles and 2 sacks. He had 7 tackles against Portland State University. He made 7 tackles against the University of Utah.

As a junior, he appeared in 13 games with 8 starts. He registered 39 tackles (5 for loss), 2 sacks. He had 6 tackles and 1.5 sacks against Arizona State University. He made 8 tackles (1.5 for loss) and one quarterback hurry against Oregon State University.

As a senior, the football season was reduced to 7 games due to the COVID-19 pandemic. He started in 6 contests, while collecting 21 tackles (0.5 for loss). He had five tackles against Oregon State University. He finished his college career with 43 games, 124 tackles, 10 tackles for loss, 5 sacks and 3 forced fumbles.

== Professional career ==
Pre-draft measurables
Height	Weight	Arm length	Hand span
6 ft 3 1/8 in (1.91 m)	287 lb (130 kg)	32 3/4 in (0.83 m)	9 3/4 in (0.25 m)
All values from Pro Day

=== Dallas Cowboys ===
Faoliu was signed as an undrafted free agent by the Dallas Cowboys after the 2021 NFL draft on May 14. On August 31, he was waived. On September 1, he was signed to the practice squad. On September 27, he was promoted to the active roster. He appeared in one game and had 2 tackles.

He signed a reserve/future contract with the Cowboys on January 19, 2022. He was waived on August 15, 2022.

=== Seattle Sea Dragons ===
Faoliu was selected by the XFL Seattle Sea Dragons in the Group 3 fourth round (31st overall) of the 2023 XFL draft. He appeared in 10 games with 10 starts, making 24 tackles and one sack. He was released from his contract on May 15, 2023.

=== Seattle Seahawks ===
On May 16, 2023, Faoliu signed with the Seattle Seahawks. He was placed on the reserve/PUP list on August 29, 2023. He was activated on November 6, then waived the following day and re-signed to the practice squad. He was not signed to a reserve/future contract after the season and thus became a free agent upon the expiration of his practice squad contract.

=== St. Louis Battlehawks ===
On February 19, 2024, Faoliu signed with the St. Louis Battlehawks of the United Football League (UFL), and signed a new contract with them on February 27.
