= Mykael Wright =

American football player (born 2000)

No. 2
- Position: Cornerback

Personal information
- Born: June 15, 2000 (age 26); Antelope Valley, California, U.S.
- Listed height: 5 ft 10 in (1.78 m)
- Listed weight: 181 lb (82 kg)

Career information
- High school: Antelope Valley (Lancaster, California)
- College: Oregon (2019–2021)
- NFL draft: 2022: undrafted

Career history
- Arizona Cardinals (2022)*; Seattle Sea Dragons (2023); St. Louis Battlehawks (2024)*
- * Offseason or practice squad member only

Mykael Wright (born June 15, 2000) is an American former football cornerback. He played college football at Oregon.

== Early life ==
Wright attended Valencia High School in Valencia, Santa Clarita, California, before transferring to Antelope Valley High School in Lancaster, California, for his senior year. He played in the 2019 Under Armour All-American Game and the Polynesian Bowl. Wright committed to the University of Oregon to play college football.

== College career ==
As a true freshman at Oregon in 2019, Wright played in all 14 games, recording 21 tackles, one interception and two kick return for touchdowns. Wright started all seven games in the COVID-19 pandemic-shortened 2020, recording 27 tackles. He returned as a starter in 2021.

== Professional career ==
Pre-draft measurables
Height	Weight	Arm length	Hand span	Wingspan	40-yard dash	10-yard split	20-yard split	20-yard shuttle	Three-cone drill	Vertical jump	Broad jump
5 ft 10 1/2 in (1.79 m)	173 lb (78 kg)	30 1/2 in (0.77 m)	9 in (0.23 m)	6 ft 2 3/4 in (1.90 m)	4.56 s	1.62 s	2.60 s	4.29 s	6.82 s	31.5 in (0.80 m)	9 ft 9 in (2.97 m)
All values from NFL Combine/Pro Day

Wright was not selected during the 2022 NFL draft.

=== Arizona Cardinals ===
Wright went to Arizona Cardinals rookie mini-camp as an undrafted free agent.

=== Seattle Sea Dragons ===
On November 17, 2022, Wright was drafted by the Seattle Sea Dragons of the XFL. The Sea Dragons folded when the XFL and USFL merged to create the United Football League (UFL).

=== St. Louis Battlehawks ===
On January 5, 2024, Wright was selected by the St. Louis Battlehawks during the 2024 UFL dispersal draft. He signed with the team on January 31. He was waived on March 17.
