= Johnny Johnson III =

American football player (born 1999)

Saskatchewan Roughriders
- Position: Wide receiver
- Roster status: Practice roster
- CFL status: American

Personal information
- Born: May 14, 1999 (age 27); Chandler, Arizona, U.S.
- Listed height: 6 ft 1 in (1.85 m)
- Listed weight: 200 lb (91 kg)

Career information
- High school: Chandler
- College: Oregon (2017–2021)
- NFL draft: 2022: undrafted

Career history
- Houston Texans (2022–2024); Saskatchewan Roughriders (2026–present)

Career NFL statistics
- Games played: 2
- Stats at Pro Football Reference

Johnny Johnson III (born May 14, 1999) is an American professional football wide receiver for the Saskatchewan Roughriders of the Canadian Football League (CFL). He played college football for the Oregon Ducks from 2017 to 2021.

== College career ==
As a junior, Johnson caught 57 passes for 836 yards and seven touchdowns for the 2019 Oregon Ducks football team that won the Pac-12 Conference championship and defeated Wisconsin in the 2020 Rose Bowl. As a fifth-year senior in 2021, he tallied 25 receptions for 311 yards before an injury sustained against Washington State ended his season. He finished his college career with 139 receptions and 1,928 receiving yards.

== Professional career ==
Pre-draft measurables
Height	Weight	Arm length	Hand span	Wingspan	40-yard dash	10-yard split	20-yard split	20-yard shuttle	Three-cone drill	Vertical jump	Broad jump	Bench press
5 ft 11 7/8 in (1.83 m)	197 lb (89 kg)	30 1/2 in (0.77 m)	9 3/4 in (0.25 m)	6 ft 2 1/8 in (1.88 m)	4.60 s	1.53 s	2.56 s	4.28 s	7.14 s	35.5 in (0.90 m)	10 ft 1 in (3.07 m)	18 reps
All values from NFL Combine/Pro Day

=== Houston Texans ===
On April 30, 2022, Johnson signed with the Houston Texans as an undrafted free agent. Johnson was waived during final roster cuts on August 30, but signed to the team's practice squad the following day. He appeared in one game during his rookie season. He signed a reserve/future contract on January 10, 2023.

On August 29, 2023, Johnson was waived by the Texans and re-signed to the practice squad. He signed a reserve/future contract on January 22, 2024.

Johnson was waived by the Texans on August 27, 2024, and re-signed to the practice squad. He signed a reserve/future contract with the Texans on January 21, 2025. Johnson was waived/injured by Houston on August 6.

=== Saskatchewan Roughriders ===
On May 19, 2026, Johnson signed with the Saskatchewan Roughriders of the Canadian Football League (CFL).
