= Grant Gunnell =

American football player (born 1999)

No. 5
- Position: Quarterback

Personal information
- Born: November 24, 1999 (age 26)
- Listed height: 6 ft 5 in (1.96 m)
- Listed weight: 220 lb (100 kg)

Career information
- High school: St. Pius X (Houston, Texas)
- College: Arizona (2019–2020); Memphis (2021); North Texas (2022); Sam Houston (2023–2024)

Awards and highlights
- USA Today All-American (2018)
- Stats at ESPN

Grant Gunnell (born November 24, 1999) is an American former college football player who was a quarterback for the Arizona Wildcats, Memphis Tigers, North Texas Mean Green, and Sam Houston Bearkats.

== Early life ==
Gunnell first gained recognition as a 7th grader at Knox Junior High in The Woodlands, Texas, where he led his team to an undefeated season with 84–0 and 95–7 wins, and he reportedly received early recruitment interest from Arizona, Arkansas, Houston, and Texas A&M, all of whom would later offer him college scholarships. As an 8th grader, Gunnell was named the 7th best middle school player in the nation, the 2nd best middle school quarterback only behind DJ Uiagalelei, and the top quarterback for the class of 2019. His 8th grade Knox Junior High team went undefeated and were named the top-ranked 8th grade team in the nation by Youth1 Sports.

After originally playing at College Park High School as a freshman, Gunnell transferred to St. Pius X High School in Houston, Texas as a sophomore, where his older brother Nelson Gunnell was the team's quarterback. During his career at St Pius, Grant actually surpassed his older brother on the depth chart and set the Texas high school records for passing touchdowns (195) and passing yards (16,108). Grant was a USA Today All American, second team his senior year. He was a MaxPreps Junior All American, MaxPreps Sophomore All American, MaxPreps Sophomore Co-Player of the Year, and was a MaxPreps Freshman All American. Additionally, Grant played in the US Army All American Bowl and was a finalist for Player of the Year. Within the state of Texas, he was a first-team all-state selection as a Sophomore, Junior, and Senior.

A four-star recruit, Gunnell was Texas's top QB prospect and received 42 college scholarship offers, including from powerhouses like Alabama, Florida, Georgia, Notre Dame, Ohio State, and Oklahoma, to name a few. Gunnell originally committed early on to Arkansas before recommitting to Texas A&M, where his brother was playing wide receiver, but recommitted again later into his senior year to the University of Arizona, to play college football under Kevin Sumlin.

== College career ==
=== Arizona ===
Gunnell entered his freshman season at Arizona in 2019 as a backup to Khalil Tate. He made his first career start in a game against UCLA, throwing for 352 yards and a touchdown. Overall he played in eight games with three starts and completed 101 of 155 passes for 1,239 yards, nine touchdowns and one interception. However, Gunnell was also the starting quarterback during Arizona's 2020 winless season, which included their historic loss to in-state rival Arizona State 70–7. Following the game, Arizona head coach Kevin Sumlin was fired, and Gunnell announced on social media that he would be transferring from Arizona to Memphis.

=== Memphis ===
After transferring to the University of Memphis for the 2021 season, Gunnell saw no playing time after receiving surgery on his right leg. Following the season, Gunnell reportedly played "incredibly well" in the spring scrimmage, but ultimately transferred to North Texas.

=== North Texas ===
Gunnell transferred to North Texas University to begin play for the North Texas Mean Green in 2022. The backup to Austin Aune, Gunnell only saw playing time in two games, throwing a touchdown and an interception on 75 passing yards against Texas Southern.

=== Sam Houston ===
Gunnell transferred to Sam Houston State University to play for the Sam Houston Bearkats.

=== Statistics ===
Year	Team	Games		Passing								Rushing			
Year	Team	GP	Record	Comp	Att	Pct	Yards	Avg	TD	Int	Rate	Att	Yards	Avg	TD
2019	Arizona	8	1–2	101	155	65.2	1,239	8.0	9	1	150.2	32	14	0.4	1
2020	Arizona	4	0–4	64	93	68.8	625	6.7	6	2	142.3	23	22	1.0	0
2021	Memphis	DNP													
2022	North Texas	2	—	4	9	44.4	75	8.3	0	1	92.2	1	−5	−5.0	0
2023	Sam Houston	1	0–1	14	22	63.6	100	4.5	0	1	92.7	4	−4	−1.0	0
Career		15	1–7	183	279	65.6	2,039	7.3	15	5	141.1	60	27	0.5	1
