= CJ Verdell =

American football player (born 1999)

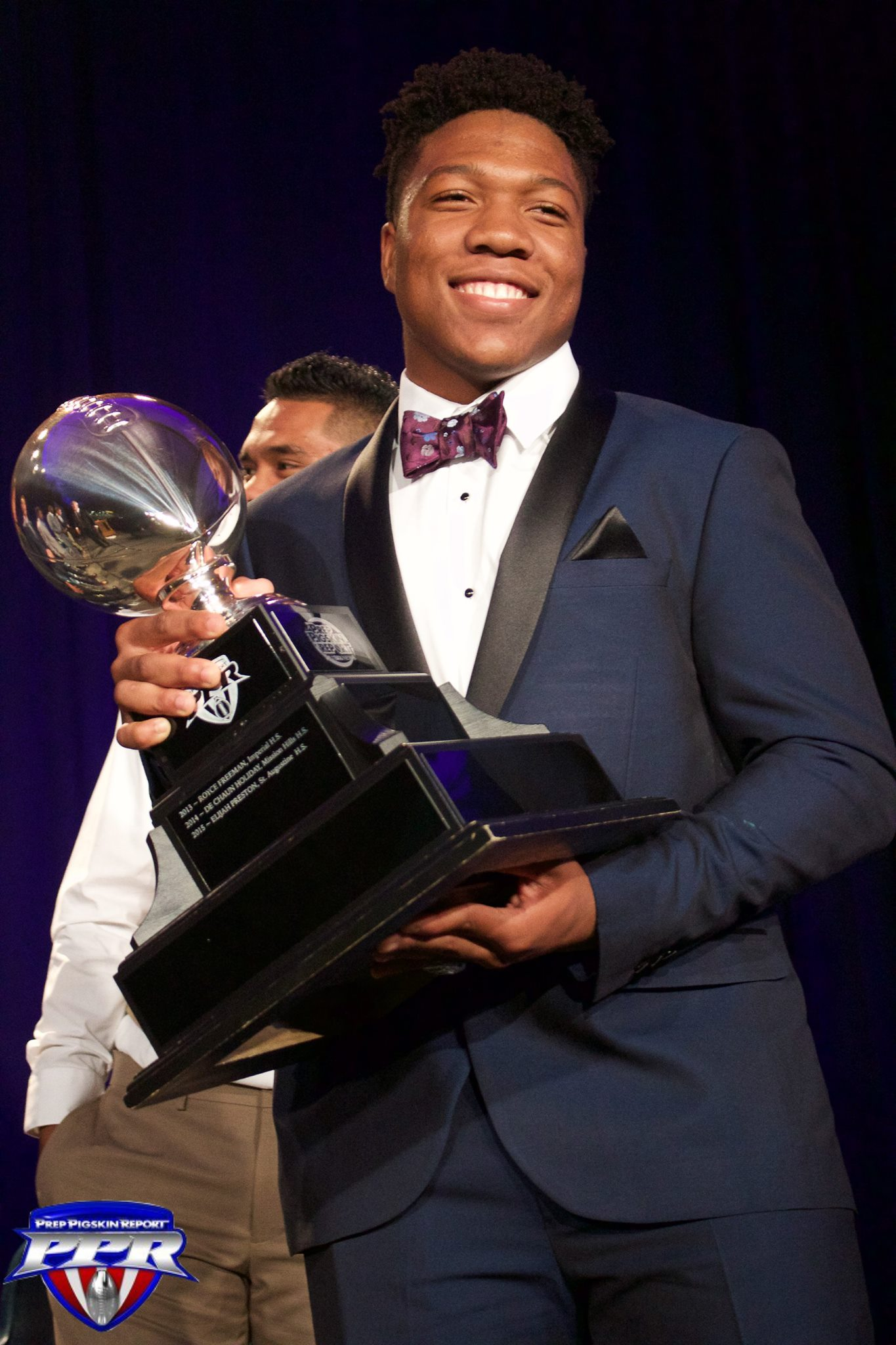

No. 30
- Position: Running back

Personal information
- Born: August 16, 1999 (age 27); Chula Vista, California, U.S.
- Listed height: 5 ft 8 in (1.73 m)
- Listed weight: 194 lb (88 kg)

Career information
- High school: Mater Dei (Chula Vista)
- College: Oregon (2017–2021)
- NFL draft: 2022: undrafted

Career history
- Indianapolis Colts (2022)*
- * Offseason or practice squad member only

Awards and highlights
- Second-team All-Pac 12 (2019)

CJ Verdell (born August 16, 1999) is an American former professional football running back. He played college football for the Oregon Ducks.

== Early life ==
Verdell attended Mater Dei High School in Chula Vista, California. As a senior, he rushed for 2,399 yards on 262 carries with 36 touchdowns. He committed to the University of Oregon to play college football.

== College career ==
Verdell redshirted his first year at Oregon in 2017.

As a Redshirt Freshman, Verdell ran the ball 202 times for 1,018 yards and 10 Touchdowns. He also caught 27 passes for 315 yards and 2 Touchdowns. He returned to Oregon as the starter in 2019 and ran 197 times for 1,220 yards and 8 Touchdowns while collecting 14 receptions for 125 yards. In the 2019 Pac-12 Football Championship Game, he rushed for 208 yards with three touchdowns and was named the game's MVP.

== Professional career ==
Pre-draft measurables
Height	Weight	Arm length	Hand span	Wingspan	40-yard dash	10-yard split	20-yard split	20-yard shuttle	Vertical jump	Broad jump	Bench press
5 ft 7 3/4 in (1.72 m)	194 lb (88 kg)	29 1/4 in (0.74 m)	9 1/2 in (0.24 m)	6 ft 0 1/4 in (1.84 m)	4.68 s	1.58 s	2.60 s	4.34 s	31.0 in (0.79 m)	9 ft 10 in (3.00 m)	11 reps
All values from NFL Combine/Pro Day

Verdell signed with the Indianapolis Colts as an undrafted free agent on May 13, 2022. He was waived on August 23.
