= 2019 USC Trojans football team =

American college football season

2019 USC Trojans football

Holiday Bowl, L 24–49 vs. Iowa
- Conference: Pac-12 Conference
- South Division
- Record: 8–5 (7–2 Pac-12)
- Head coach: Clay Helton (4th season)
- Offensive coordinator: Graham Harrell (1st season)
- Offensive scheme: Air raid
- Defensive coordinator: Clancy Pendergast (5th season)
- Base defense: 4–3
- Captain: 4: Michael Pittman Jr.; Christian Rector; Jordan Iosefa; John Houston Jr.
- Home stadium: United Airlines Field at the Los Angeles Memorial Coliseum

Uniform
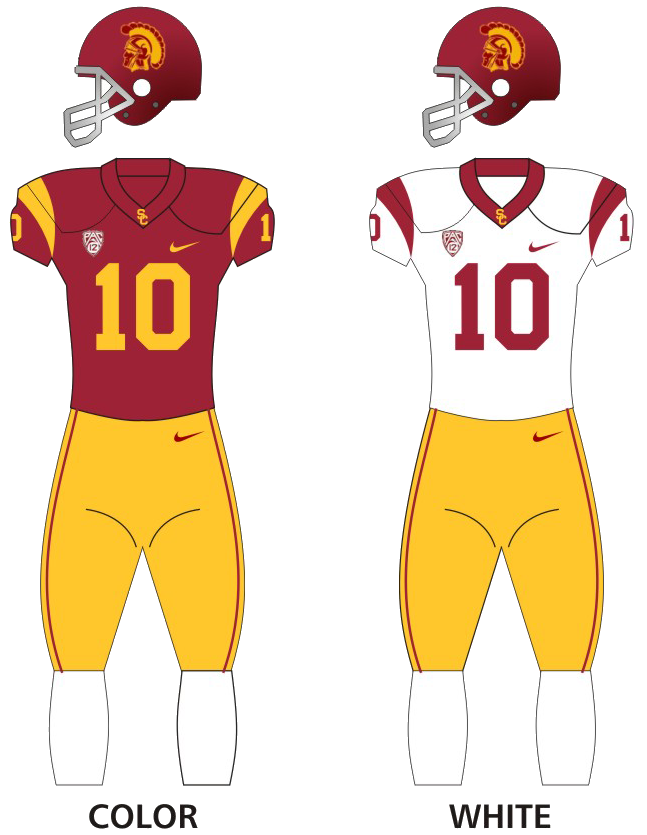

2019 Pac-12 Conference football standings
	Conf.			Overall
Team	W		L	W		L
North Division
No. 5 Oregon xy$	8	–	1	12	–	2
California	4	–	5	8	–	5
Washington	4	–	5	8	–	5
Oregon State	4	–	5	5	–	7
Washington State	3	–	6	6	–	7
Stanford	3	–	6	4	–	8
South Division
No. 16 Utah xy	8	–	1	11	–	3
USC	7	–	2	8	–	5
Arizona State	4	–	5	8	–	5
UCLA	4	–	5	4	–	8
Colorado	3	–	6	5	–	7
Arizona	2	–	7	4	–	8
Championship: Oregon 37, Utah 15
$ – Conference champion; x – Division champion/co-champions; y – Championship game participant; Rankings from AP Poll

The 2019 USC Trojans football team represented the University of Southern California in the 2019 NCAA Division I FBS football season. They played their home games at the Los Angeles Memorial Coliseum and competed as members of the South Division of the Pac-12 Conference. They were led by fourth-year head coach Clay Helton.

== Preseason ==
=== Transfers ===
The Trojans lost nine players due to transfer. QB Matt Fink, WR Velus Jones Jr., and CB Greg Johnson all entered the NCAA transfer portal, but ultimately decided to return to USC. WR Keyshawn Pie Young, a redshirt junior, announced his intention to transfer on June 28, 2019, and on July 10 of the same year, freshman CB Trey Davis entered the NCAA transfer portal after just one month of enrollment. After QB Jack Sears was officially listed as the fourth-string quarterback on the depth chart, behind starter J.T. Daniels, true freshman Kedon Slovis and Fink, Sears decided to enter the transfer portal as well but counted for 2020 Transfer portal.

Name	Number	Pos.	Height	Weight	Year	Hometown	Transfer to
Oluwole Betiku Jr.	#99	OLB	6'3	240	Junior	Lagos, Nigeria	Illinois Fighting Illini
Bubba Bolden	#2	S	6'3	190	Sophomore	Las Vegas, NV	Miami Hurricanes
Randal Grimes	#87	WR	6'4	205	Sophomore	Las Vegas, NV	UNLV Rebels
Josh Imatorbhebhe	#17	WR	6'2	215	Sophomore (redshirt)	Suwanee, GA	Illinois Fighting Illini
Levi Jones	#13	ILB	6'3	220	Sophomore	Austin, TX	NC State Wolfpack
Ykili Ross	#14	S	6'1	195	Junior (redshirt)	Riverside, CA	UTEP Miners
Trevon Sidney	#13	WR	5'11	170	Sophomore (redshirt)	Pasadena, CA	Illinois Fighting Illini
Keyshawn "Pie" Young	#85	WR	5'11	170	Sophomore (redshirt)	Miami, FL	Marshall Thundering Herd

The Trojans added 4 players via transfer.

Name	Number	Pos.	Height	Weight	Year	Hometown	Transfer from
Bru McCoy	#14	WR	6'2	205	Freshman	Santa Ana, CA	Texas Longhorns
Clyde Moore	#54	LB	6'0	225	Freshman	Newport Beach, CA	Colorado Buffaloes
Chris Steele	#8	CB	6'2	187	Freshman	Bellflower, CA	Florida Gators
Drew Richmond	#53	OT	6'5	316	Senior (redshirt)	Memphis, TN	Tennessee Volunteers

=== Returning starters ===
USC returns 25 starters in 2019 including 10 on offense, 12 on defense, and 3 on special teams.

Key departures include Aca'Cedric Ware (TB – 10 games), Tyler Petite (TE – 12 games), Chuma Edoga (OT – 10 games), Chris Brown (OG – 12 games), Toa Lobendahn (C – 11 games), Jordan Austin (OG – 1 game), Malik Dorton (DT – 11 games), Porter Gustin (OLB – 5 games), Cameron Smith (ILB – 9 games), Iman Marshall (CB – 12 games), Ajene Harris (CB – 12 games), Isaiah Langley (CB – 8 games), Jonathan Lockett (CB – 5 games), Marvel Tell III (S – 10 games), Reid Budrovich (P – 12 games), Wyatt Schmidt (H – 12 games).

Other departures include Jake Russell (WR), Daniel Imatorbhebhe (TE), Reuben Peters (ILB), and Jake Olson (LS).

==== Offense (10) ====
Player	Class	Position	Games started
JT Daniels	Sophomore	Quarterback	11 games
Vavae Malepeai	Junior (redshirt)	Tailback	2 games
Michael Pittman Jr.	Senior	Wide receiver	11 games
Tyler Vaughns	Junior (redshirt)	Wide receiver	11 games
Amon-Ra St. Brown	Sophomore	Wide receiver	6 games
Velus Jones Jr.	Junior (redshirt)	Wide receiver	4 games
Austin Jackson	Junior	Offensive tackle	12 games
Andrew Vorhees	Junior	Offensive guard	11 games
Jalen McKenzie	Sophomore (redshirt)	Offensive tackle	2 games
Brett Neilon	Sophomore (redshirt)	Center	1 game

==== Defense (12) ====
Player	Class	Position	Games started
Christian Rector	Senior (redshirt)	Defensive end	12 games
Marlon Tuipulotu	Sophomore (redshirt)	Defensive tackle	9 games
Brandon Pili	Junior	Defensive tackle	3 games
Jay Tufele	Sophomore (redshirt)	Defensive tackle	1 game
John Houston Jr.	Senior (redshirt)	Inside linebacker	11 games
Jordan Iosefa	Senior	Outside linebacker	12 games
Palaie Gaoteote IV	Sophomore	Inside linebacker	5 games
Greg Johnson	Sophomore (redshirt)	Defensive back	4 games
Chase Williams	Freshman (redshirt)	Defensive back	1 game
Talanoa Hufanga	Sophomore	Safety	5 games
Isaiah Pola-Mao	Sophomore (redshirt)	Safety	2 games
C.J. Pollard	Junior (redshirt)	Safety	1 game

==== Special teams (3) ====
Player	Class	Position	Games started
Chase McGrath	Sophomore (redshirt)	Kicker	3 games
Damon Johnson	Junior (redshirt)	Long snapper	12 games
Michael Brown	Junior (redshirt)	Kicker	9 games

=== Recruiting class ===
College recruiting information (2019)
Name	Hometown	School	Height	Weight	Commit date
Kyle Ford #6 WR	Corona, California	Orange Lutheran High School	6 ft 2 in (1.88 m)	210 lb (95 kg)	February 6, 2019 (Signed) / January 5, 2019 (Committed)
Kyle Ford #6 WR	Recruit ratings: Scout: 247Sports: ESPN:				
Drake Jackson #3 SDE	Corona, California	Centennial High School	6 ft 4 in (1.93 m)	260 lb (120 kg)	December 19, 2018 (Signed) / December 19, 2018 (Committed)
Drake Jackson #3 SDE	Recruit ratings: Scout: 247Sports: ESPN:				
Max Williams #21 CB	Carson, California	Junipero Serra High School	5 ft 9 in (1.75 m)	175 lb (79 kg)	December 19, 2018 (Signed) / October 6, 2018 (Committed)
Max Williams #21 CB	Recruit ratings: Scout: 247Sports: ESPN:				
Maninoa Tufono #12 ILB	Halawa, Hawaii	Punahou School	6 ft 3 in (1.91 m)	235 lb (107 kg)	December 19, 2018 (Signed) / August 6, 2018 (Committed)
Maninoa Tufono #12 ILB	Recruit ratings: Scout: 247Sports: ESPN:				
Jude Wolfe #8 TE	Laguna Hills, California	St. John Bosco High School	6 ft 5 in (1.96 m)	250 lb (110 kg)	December 19, 2018 (Signed) / August 3, 2018 (Committed)
Jude Wolfe #8 TE	Recruit ratings: Scout: 247Sports: ESPN:				
Drake London #35 WR	Moorpark, California	Moorpark High School	6 ft 5 in (1.96 m)	205 lb (93 kg)	December 19, 2018 (Signed) / June 27, 2018 (Committed)
Drake London #35 WR	Recruit ratings: Scout: 247Sports: ESPN:				
Jason Rodriguez #24 OT	Oak Hills, California	Oak Hills High School	6 ft 6 in (1.98 m)	325 lb (147 kg)	December 19, 2018 (Signed) / April 22, 2018 (Committed)
Jason Rodriguez #24 OT	Recruit ratings: Scout: 247Sports: ESPN:				
Kenan Christon #30 TB	San Diego, California	Madison High School	5 ft 10 in (1.78 m)	185 lb (84 kg)	December 19, 2018 (Signed) / September 17, 2018 (Committed)
Kenan Christon #30 TB	Recruit ratings: Scout: 247Sports: ESPN:				
Ethan Rae #22 TE	Anaheim Hills, California	Orange Lutheran High School	6 ft 5 in (1.96 m)	240 lb (110 kg)	December 19, 2018 (Signed) / July 12, 2018 (Committed)
Ethan Rae #22 TE	Recruit ratings: Scout: 247Sports: ESPN:				
Briton Allen #31 S	Orlando, Florida	IMG Academy	6 ft 0 in (1.83 m)	185 lb (84 kg)	December 19, 2018 (Signed) / December 19, 2018 (Committed)
Briton Allen #31 S	Recruit ratings: Scout: 247Sports: ESPN:				
Ralen Goforth #22 OLB	Long Beach, California	St. John Bosco High School	6 ft 2 in (1.88 m)	225 lb (102 kg)	December 19, 2018 (Signed) / December 19, 2018 (Committed)
Ralen Goforth #22 OLB	Recruit ratings: Scout: 247Sports: ESPN:				
Nick Figueroa #2 SDE (JuCo)	San Bernardino, California	Riverside City College	6 ft 5 in (1.96 m)	270 lb (120 kg)	December 19, 2018 (Signed) / December 19, 2018 (Committed)
Nick Figueroa #2 SDE (JuCo)	Recruit ratings: Scout: 247Sports: ESPN:				
Adonis Otey #52 CB	Columbia, Tennessee	Blackman High School	6 ft 1 in (1.85 m)	180 lb (82 kg)	February 6, 2019 (Signed) / February 6, 2019 (Committed)
Adonis Otey #52 CB	Recruit ratings: Scout: 247Sports: ESPN:				
Munir McClain #70 WR	San Juan Capistrano, California	JSerra Catholic High School	6 ft 4 in (1.93 m)	210 lb (95 kg)	December 19, 2018 (Signed) / April 2, 2018 (Committed)
Munir McClain #70 WR	Recruit ratings: Scout: 247Sports: ESPN:				
Kedon Slovis #26 QB-Pro	Scottsdale, Arizona	Desert Mountain High School	6 ft 2 in (1.88 m)	185 lb (84 kg)	December 19, 2018 (Signed) / May 19, 2018 (Committed)
Kedon Slovis #26 QB-Pro	Recruit ratings: Scout: 247Sports: ESPN:				
Tuasivi Nomura #55 OLB	Corona, California	Centennial High School	6 ft 1 in (1.85 m)	210 lb (95 kg)	February 6, 2019 (Signed) / February 6, 2019 (Committed)
Tuasivi Nomura #55 OLB	Recruit ratings: Scout: 247Sports: ESPN:				
Stanley Ta'ufo'ou #35 ILB	Simi Valley, California	Grace Brethren High School	6 ft 3 in (1.91 m)	255 lb (116 kg)	December 19, 2018 (Signed) / May 9, 2018 (Committed)
Stanley Ta'ufo'ou #35 ILB	Recruit ratings: Scout: 247Sports: ESPN:				
Dejon Benton #78 DT	Oakland, California	Pittsburg High School	6 ft 3 in (1.91 m)	285 lb (129 kg)	December 19, 2018 (Signed) / December 19, 2018 (Committed)
Dejon Benton #78 DT	Recruit ratings: Scout: 247Sports: ESPN:				
Jayden Williams #102 S	Laton, California	Centennial High School	6 ft 1 in (1.85 m)	195 lb (88 kg)	February 6, 2019 (Signed) / February 5, 2019 (Committed)
Jayden Williams #102 S	Recruit ratings: Scout: 247Sports: ESPN:				
Gino Quinones #86 SDE (+OL)	Ewa Beach, Hawaii	Saint Louis School	6 ft 3 in (1.91 m)	280 lb (130 kg)	December 19, 2018 (Signed) / May 18, 2018 (Committed)
Gino Quinones #86 SDE (+OL)	Recruit ratings: Scout: 247Sports: ESPN:				
Kaulana Makaula #108 S	Kailua, Hawaii	Punahou School	6 ft 3 in (1.91 m)	190 lb (86 kg)	February 6, 2019 (Signed) / January 27, 2019 (Committed)
Kaulana Makaula #108 S	Recruit ratings: Scout: 247Sports: ESPN:				
Dorian Hewett #127 S	Houston, Texas	North Shore Senior High School	6 ft 0 in (1.83 m)	180 lb (82 kg)	February 6, 2019 (Signed) / February 5, 2019 (Committed)
Dorian Hewett #127 S	Recruit ratings: Scout: 247Sports: ESPN:				
Ben Griffiths; P	Melbourne, Australia	Richmond Tigers	6 ft 5 in (1.96 m)	230 lb (100 kg)	December 22, 2018 (Signed) / December 22, 2018 (Committed)
Ben Griffiths; P	Recruit ratings: Scout: 247Sports: ESPN:				
Will Rose; P	Bellflower, California	St. John Bosco High School	6 ft 2 in (1.88 m)	185 lb (84 kg)	Walk-On / 2019
Will Rose; P	Recruit ratings: Scout: 247Sports: ESPN:				
Scott Harris; QB	Los Angeles, California	Fairfax High School	6 ft 1 in (1.85 m)	185 lb (84 kg)	Walk-On / 2019
Scott Harris; QB	Recruit ratings: Scout: 247Sports: ESPN:				
Chase Locke; WR	Helotes, Texas	O'Connor High School	6 ft 3 in (1.91 m)	190 lb (86 kg)	Walk-On / 2019
Chase Locke; WR	Recruit ratings: Scout: 247Sports: ESPN:				
Overall recruit ranking: Scout: – 247Sports: #20 ESPN: –
Note: In many cases, Scout, Rivals, 247Sports, On3, and ESPN may conflict in their listings of height and weight.; In these cases, the average was taken. ESPN grades are on a 100-point scale.; Sources: "2019 Team Ranking". Rivals.com.

=== 2019 NFL draft ===
==== NFL Combine ====
The official list of participants for the 2019 NFL Combine included USC football players ILB Cameron Smith, CB Iman Marshall, OLB Porter Gustin, OT Chuma Edoga & S Marvell Tell III.

==== Team players drafted into the NFL ====
Player	Position	Round	Pick	NFL team
Chuma Edoga	Offensive tackle	3	92 (28)	New York Jets
Iman Marshall	Cornerback	4	127 (25)	Baltimore Ravens
Marvell Tell	Safety	5	144 (6)	Indianapolis Colts
Cameron Smith	Inside Linebacker	5	162 (24)	Minnesota Vikings
Porter Gustin	Outside linebacker	UDFA	–	New Orleans Saints
Chris Brown	Offensive guard	UDFA	–	Los Angeles Chargers
Toa Lobendahn	Center	UDFA	–	New York Jets
Isaiah Langley	Cornerback	UDFA	–	Oakland Raiders
Malik Dorton	Defensive tackle	UDFA	–	Oakland Raiders
Aca'Cedric Ware	Tailback	UDFA	–	Indianapolis Colts
Ajene Harris	Cornerback	UDFA	–	Philadelphia Eagles

=== Pac-12 media days ===
==== Pac-12 media polls ====
In the 2019 Pac-12 preseason media poll, USC was voted to finish in second place in the South Division behind Utah. The Trojans received the fourth most votes to win the Pac-12 Championship Game.

== Schedule ==
Date	Time	Opponent	Rank	Site	TV	Result	Attendance
August 31	7:30 p.m.	Fresno State*		Los Angeles Memorial Coliseum; Los Angeles, CA	ESPN	W 31–23	57,329
September 7	7:30 p.m.	No. 23 Stanford		Los Angeles Memorial Coliseum; Los Angeles, CA (rivalry)	ESPN	W 45–20	62,109
September 14	12:30 p.m.	at BYU*	No. 24	LaVell Edwards Stadium; Provo, UT	ABC	L 27–30 ^{OT}	62,546
September 20	6:00 p.m.	No. 10 Utah		Los Angeles Memorial Coliseum; Los Angeles, CA	FS1	W 30–23	55,719
September 28	12:30 p.m.	at No. 17 Washington	No. 21	Husky Stadium; Seattle, WA	FOX	L 14–28	66,975
October 12	4:30 p.m.	at No. 9 Notre Dame*		Notre Dame Stadium; South Bend, IN (Jeweled Shillelagh)	NBC	L 27–30	77,622
October 19	6:30 p.m.	Arizona^{†}		Los Angeles Memorial Coliseum; Los Angeles, CA	P12N	W 41–14	53,826
October 25	6:00 p.m.	at Colorado		Folsom Field; Boulder, CO	ESPN2	W 35–31	48,913
November 2	5:00 p.m.	No. 7 Oregon		Los Angeles Memorial Coliseum; Los Angeles, CA	FOX	L 24–56	63,011
November 9	12:30 p.m.	at Arizona State		Sun Devil Stadium; Tempe, AZ	ABC	W 31–26	54,191
November 16	8:00 p.m.	at California		California Memorial Stadium; Berkeley, CA	FS1	W 41–17	46,397
November 23	12:30 p.m.	UCLA	No. 23	Los Angeles Memorial Coliseum; Los Angeles, CA (Victory Bell)	ABC	W 52–35	64,156
December 27	5:00 p.m.	vs. No. 16 Iowa*	No. 22	SDCCU Stadium; San Diego, CA (Holiday Bowl)	FS1	L 24–49	50,123
*Non-conference game; ^{†}Homecoming; Rankings from AP Poll and CFP Rankings after November 5 released prior to game; All times are in Pacific time

== Personnel ==
=== Coaching staff ===
Name	Position	Seasons at USC	Alma mater	Before USC
Clay Helton	Head coach	9	Houston (1994)	Memphis – Offensive coordinator (2009)
John Baxter	Special teams coordinator / tight ends coach	8	Iowa State (1987)	Michigan – Special teams coordinator (2015)
Graham Harrell	Offensive coordinator / quarterbacks coach	1	Texas Tech (2009)	North Texas – Offensive coordinator / quarterbacks coach (2018)
Clancy Pendergast	Defensive coordinator / assistant head coach	6	Arizona (1990)	San Francisco 49ers – Linebackers coach (2015)
Greg Burns	Secondary coach	5	Washington State (1995)	Oregon State – Defensive backs coach (2018)
Keary Colbert	Wide receivers coach	5	USC (2006)	Alabama – Offensive analyst (2015)
Joe DeForest	Outside linebackers coach	2	Louisiana Lafayette (1987)	Kansas – Special teams coordinator (2017)
Tim Drevno	Offensive line coach / running game coordinator / pass protection coordinator	3	Cal State Fullerton (1992)	Michigan – Offensive coordinator / offensive line coach (2015)
Mike Jinks	Tailbacks coach	1	Angelo State (1993)	Bowling Green – Head coach (2018)
Chad Kauha'aha'a	Defensive line coach	1	Utah (1996)	Boise State – Defensive line coach (2018)
Johnny Nansen	Inside linebackers coach / Defensive run game coordinator	6	Washington State (1997)	Washington – Special teams coordinator / Tailbacks coach (2013)
Aaron Ausmus	Head strength and conditioning coach	3	Tennessee (1998)	Tennessee – Director of strength and conditioning (2009)
Dane Stevens	Offensive graduate assistant – Quarterbacks	3	USC (2016)	USC – Student assistant coach (2016)
Viane Talamaivao	Offensive graduate assistant – Offensive Line	1	USC (2018)	USC – Offensive Guard (2017)
Michael Hutchings	Defensive graduate assistant – Linebackers	2	USC (2017)	USC – Inside linebacker (2016)
Chris Hawkins	Defensive graduate assistant – Secondary	1	USC (2017)	USC – Defensive back (2017)
Steve Murillo	Offensive quality control analyst	6	Cal State Northridge (2003)	Washington – Director of player personal (2013)
Lenny Vandermade	Offensive quality control analyst	8	USC (2003)	San Diego – Tight end coach (2008)
John David Baker	Offensive quality control analyst	1	Abilene Christian (2013)	North Texas – Offensive quality control coach (2018)
Seth Doege	Offensive quality control analyst	1	Texas Tech (2011)	Bowling Green – Special teams coordinator (2018)
Brett Arce	Defensive quality control analyst	4	Stony Brook (2012)	Stony Brook – Tight ends coach (2015)
Shawn Howe	Defensive quality control analyst	3	Rocky Mountain College (2005)	Coastal Carolina – Defensive line coach (2018)
Joe Bolden	Special teams quality control analyst	1	Michigan (2015)	Washington State – Defensive graduate assistant (2018)
Jared Klingenberg	Assistant strength and conditioning coach	1	Idaho (2015)	San Jose State – Assistant athletic performance coach (2018)
Darren Mustin	Assistant strength and conditioning coach	3	Alabama (2007)	UMass – Sports performance coach (2018)
Christian Tupou	Assistant strength and conditioning coach	1	USC (2013)	–
Tony "Ty" Webb	Assistant strength and conditioning coach	1	Louisiana College (2010)	Southern – Head strength and conditioning coach (2018)

=== Roster ===
2019 USC Trojans Football roster
Quarterback: 4 Trevor Scully – (redshirt) Freshman (5′11, 170); 9 Kedon Slovis – Freshman (6′2, 200); 16 Scott Harris – Freshman (6′1, 185); 18 JT Daniels – Sophomore (6′3, 210); 19 Matt Fink – (redshirt) Junior (6′3, 200); Tailback: 7 Stephen Carr – Junior (6′0, 210); 23 Kenan Christon – Freshman (5′10, 185); 27 Quincy Jountti – (redshirt) Junior (5′10, 210); 29 Vavae Malepeai – (redshirt) Junior (6′0, 220); 30 Markese Stepp – (redshirt) Freshman (6′0, 235); 37 Ben Easington – (redshirt) Sophomore (5′10, 210); 38 Chris Edmondson – (redshirt) Junior (5′9, 190); Wide receiver: 1 Velus Jones Jr. – (redshirt) Junior (6′0, 190); 6 Michael Pittman Jr. – Senior (6′4, 220); 8 Amon-Ra St. Brown – Sophomore (6′1, 195); 13 Munir McClain – Freshman (6′4, 210); 14 Bru McCoy – Freshman (6′3, 210); 15 Drake London – Freshman (6′5, 205); 16 Dominic Davis – (redshirt) Senior (5′9, 195) (+CB) (+RB); 17 Zach Wilson – (redshirt) Freshman (6′1, 205); 21 Tyler Vaughns – (redshirt) Junior (6′2, 190); 22 Jack Webster – (redshirt) Sophomore (6′0, 190); 27 Matthew Hocum – (redshirt) Senior (5′10, 175); 36 Brad Aoki – (redshirt) Freshman (5′9, 170) (+CB); 41 Chris Caulk – (redshirt) Junior (6′3, 210); 80 John Jackson III – Freshman (6′2, 210); 81 Kyle Ford – Freshman (6′2, 210); 86 Chase Locke – Freshman (6′4, 190); Tight end: 46 Scott Voigt – (redshirt) Junior (6′3, 220); 82 Jude Wolfe – Freshman (6′5, 250); 83 Josh Falo – Junior (6′6, 230); 84 Erik Krommenhoek – Junior (6′5, 260); 85 Ethan Rae – Freshman (6′5, 240); 89 Sean Mahoney – Freshman (6′5, 215)	Offensive Lineman: 51 Bernard Schirmer – OT – (redshirt) Junior (6′6, 290); 52 Jacob Daniel – OG – (redshirt) Senior (6′4, 310); 53 Drew Richmond – OT – (redshirt) Senior (6′5, 315); 57 Justin Dedich – C – (redshirt) Freshman (6′2, 295); 62 Brett Neilon – C – (redshirt) Sophomore (6′2, 300); 63 Damian Lopez – OG-OT – (redshirt) Sophomore (6′6, 320); 64 AJ Mageo – OG-OT – (redshirt) Freshman (6′5, 300); 65 Frank Martin II – OG – (redshirt) Junior (6′4, 300); 66 Gino Quinones – C-OG – Freshman (6′3, 280); 67 Mark Zuvich – C – (redshirt) Freshman (6′3, 260); 68 Liam Douglass – OG-OT – (redshirt) Freshman (6′5, 300); 70 Jalen McKenzie – OT – (redshirt) Sophomore (6′5, 310); 71 Liam Jimmons – OT – (redshirt) Junior (6′4, 305); 72 Andrew Vorhees – OG-OT – Junior (6′6, 315); 73 Austin Jackson – OT – Junior (6′6, 310); 75 Alijah Vera-Tucker – OG – (redshirt) Sophomore (6′4, 310); 76 Clayton Bradley – OT – (redshirt) Senior (6′5, 295); 77 Jason Rodriguez – OG-OT – Freshman (6′6, 325); Defensive line: 47 Stanley Ta'ufo'ou – Freshman (6′3, 270); 50 Nick Figueroa – (redshirt) Sophomore (6′5, 280); 51 Marlon Tuipulotu – (redshirt) Sophomore (6′3, 305); 78 Jay Tufele – (redshirt) Sophomore (6′3, 305); 79 De'jon Benton – Freshman (6′3, 285); 89 Christian Rector – (redshirt) Senior (6′4, 270); 90 Connor Murphy – (redshirt) Junior (6′7, 270); 91 Brandon Pili – Junior (6′4, 325); 95 Trevor Trout – (redshirt) Freshman (6′4, 315); 96 Caleb Tremblay – (redshirt) Junior (6′5, 270); 97 Jacob Lichtenstein – (redshirt) Sophomore (6′5, 280); 99 Drake Jackson – Freshman (6′4, 275); Outside Linebacker: 31 Hunter Echols – (redshirt) Sophomore (6′5, 240); 34 Eli'Jah Winston – (redshirt) Freshman (6′3, 240); 42 Abdul-Malik McClain – (redshirt) Freshman (6′4, 240); 44 Tuasivi Nomura – Freshman (6′1, 210); 53 Bryce Matthews – (redshirt) Sophomore (6′3, 225); Long snappers: 39 Jac Casasante – (redshirt) Freshman (6′0, 215); 59 Damon Johnson – (redshirt) Junior (6′0, 205)	Inside Linebacker: 1 Palaie Gaoteote IV – Sophomore (6′2, 250); 10 John Houston Jr. – (redshirt) Senior (6′3, 220); 18 Raymond Scott – Sophomore (6′2, 225) (+S); 19 Ralen Goforth – Freshman (6′2, 225); 26 Kana'i Mauga – Sophomore (6′2, 240); 41 Juliano Falaniko – (redshirt) Sophomore (6′4, 235); 45 Maninoa Tufono – Freshman (6′3, 235); 46 Grant Jones – (redshirt) Junior (6′2, 225); 48 Peter Esparza – (redshirt) Freshman (6′1, 210); 49 Matt Bayle – (redshirt) Senior (6′0, 215); 52 Spencer Gilbert – (redshirt) Freshman (6′0, 215); 54 Clyde Moore – Freshman (6′0, 225); 56 Jordan Iosefa – Senior (6′2, 230); 58 Solomon Tuliaupupu – (redshirt) Freshman (6′3, 230); Cornerback: 2 Olaijah Griffin – Sophomore (6′0, 170); 6 Isaac Taylor-Stuart – (redshirt) Freshman (6′2, 205); 7 Chase Williams – (redshirt) Freshman (6′2, 195); 8 Chris Steele – Freshman (6′1, 190); 9 Greg Johnson – (redshirt) Sophomore (5′11, 190); 13 Adonis Otey – Freshman (6′1, 180); 14 Jayden Williams – Freshman (6′1, 195); 24 Max Williams – Freshman (5′9, 180); 37 Justin Newell – (redshirt) Junior (6′0, 175); 44 Jack Drake – (redshirt) Sophomore (5′10, 190); Safety: 15 Talanoa Hufanga – Sophomore (6′1, 210); 21 Isaiah Pola-Mao – (redshirt) Sophomore (6′4, 205); 22 Dorian Hewett – Freshman (6′0, 180); 23 Kaulana Makaula – Freshman (6′3, 190); 25 Briton Allen – Freshman (6′0, 185); 27 Brandon Perdue – (redshirt) Junior (6′4, 205) (+QB); 28 C.J. Pollard – (redshirt) Junior (6′1, 195); 30 Jordan McMillan – (redshirt) Freshman (5′11, 195); 31 Richard Hagestad – (redshirt) Junior (6′1, 200); Placekicker: 15 Thomas Fitts – (redshirt) Senior (6′1, 185); 38 Alex Stadthaus – Sophomore (6′2, 200); 40 Chase McGrath – (redshirt) Sophomore (6′0, 190); 49 Michael Brown – (redshirt) Junior (6′1, 195); Punter: 24 Ben Griffiths – (redshirt) Freshman (6′5, 240); 36 Will Rose – Freshman (6′1, 175); 47 Michael Shahidi – Freshman (6′0, 180)
2019 USC Football Roster (09/21/2019)

=== Depth chart ===
Defense

FS
Isaiah Pola-Mao
C.J. Pollard
Chase Williams

WLB	MLB	SLB
Kana'i Mauga	John Houston	Hunter Echols
Raymond Scott	Ralen Goforth	Juliano Falaniko
Eli’jah Winston	Maninoa Tufono	Abdul-Malik McClain

SS
Talanoa Hufanga
Briton Allen
Dorian Hewett

CB
Olaijah Griffin
Greg Johnson
Jayden Williams

DE	DT	DT	DE
Drake Jackson	Jay Tufele	Marlon Tuipulotu	Christian Rector
Caleb Tremblay	Nick Figueroa	Brandon Pili	Connor Murphy
Jacob Lichtenstein	Trevor Trout	De'jon Benton	Stanley Tau'ufo'ou

CB
Isaac Taylor-Stuart OR Chris Steele
Max Williams
Adonis Otey

Offense

WR
Tyler Vaughns
John Jackson III
Chase Locke

WR
Amon-Ra St. Brown
Velus Jones Jr.
Kyle Ford

LT	LG	C	RG	RT
Austin Jackson	Alijah Vera-Tucker	Brett Neilon	Jalen McKenzie	Drew Richmond
Frank Martin II	Jacob Daniel	Justin Dedich	Liam Douglass	Liam Jimmons
Bernard Schirmer	A.J. Mageo	Gino Quinones	Jason Rodriguez	Clayton Bradley

TE
Erik Krommenhoek
Josh Falo
Jude Wolfe

WR
Michael Pittman Jr.
Drake London
Zach Wilson

QB
Kedon Slovis
Matt Fink
Brandon Perdue

Key reserves
Offense
– Quincy Jountti – RB
– Dominic Davis – RB
– Bru McCoy – WR
– Ethan Rae – TE
Defense
– Tuasivi Nomura – LB
Jordan McMillan – S
– Kaulana Makaula – S
Special teams
– Will Rose – P
Questionable
– Jordan Iosefa – LB
Out (season)
– Munir McClain – WR
– JT Daniels – QB
– Markese Stepp – TB
– Solomon Tuliaupupu – MLB
– Andrew Vorhees – OG
Out (mission)
– Tayler Katoa – ILB

RB
Vavae Malepeai
Stephen Carr
Kenan Christon

Special teams
PK – Chase McGrath (FGs/PATs)
PK – Alex Stadthaus OR 49. Michael Brown (KOs)
P – Ben Griffiths
KR – Velus Jones Jr.
PR – Tyler Vaughns OR Amon-Ra St. Brown
LS – Damon Johnson
H – Ben Griffiths

- Depth Chart 2019 at W

True Freshman
Double Position : *

=== Scholarship distribution chart ===
Position	Freshman (34)	Sophomore (19)	Junior (19)	Senior (8)	2020 commit (0) 2020 signed (11)	2021 commit (3)
QB 3 (1)	Kedon Slovis	JT Daniels	Matt Fink	–	–	Jake Garcia
TB 5	Kenan Christon; Markese Stepp	–	Stephen Carr; Quincy Jountti; Vavae Malepeai	–	–	–
WR 10 (2)	Kyle Ford; Bru McCoy; John Jackson III; Drake London; Munir McClain	Amon-Ra St. Brown	Tyler Vaughns; Velus Jones Jr.	Dominic Davis; Michael Pittman Jr.	Joshua Jackson Jr.	Velltray Jefferson
TE 4	Ethan Rae; Jude Wolfe	–	Josh Falo; Erik Krommenhoek	-	-	–
OL 15 (6)	Justin Dedich; Liam Douglass; Gino Quinones; Jason Rodriguez	Jalen McKenzie; Brett Neilon; Alijah Vera-Tucker	Austin Jackson; Liam Jimmons; Frank Martin II; Bernard Schirmer; Andrew Vorhees	Jacob Daniel; Clayton Bradley; Drew Richmond	Andres Dewerk; Andrew Milek; Jonah Monheim; Caadyn Stephen; Courtland Ford; Casey Collier	–
DL 12 (4)	Dejon Benton; Drake Jackson; Stanley Ta'ufo'ou; Trevor Trout	Nick Figueroa; Jacob Lichtenstein; Jay Tufele; Marlon Tuipulotu	Connor Murphy; Brandon Pili; Caleb Tremblay	Christian Rector	Kobe Pepe; Jamar Sekona; Tuli Tuipulotu	Jay Toia
LB 13 (1)	Ralen Goforth; Abdul-Malik McClain; Tuasivi Nomura; Maninoa Tufono; Solomon Tuliaupupu; Eli'Jah Winston	Hunter Echols; Juliano Falaniko; Palaie Gaoteote IV; Kana'i Mauga; Raymond Scott	–	John Houston Jr. Jordan Iosefa	–	Ma'a Gaoteote
CB 8	Adonis Otey; Chris Steele; Isaac Taylor-Stuart; Chase Williams; Jayden Williams; Max Williams	Olaijah Griffin; Greg Johnson	–	–	–	–
S 6	Briton Allen; Dorian Hewett; Kaulana Makaula	Talanoa Hufanga; Isaiah Pola-Mao	C.J. Pollard	–	–	–
SP 4 (1)	Ben Griffiths	Chase McGrath	Michael Brown; Damon Johnson	–	Parker Lewis	–
ATH (–)	x	x	x	x	–	–

redshirt year used / redshirt year eligible / * Commit

– 85 scholarships permitted, 79 currently allotted to players

– 79 recruited players on scholarship (one former walk-ons)

– LB Tayler Katoa into two-year LDS mission.

Projecting Scholarship Distribution 2019

== Game summaries ==
=== Fresno State ===
Fresno State Bulldogs at USC Trojans

Quarter	1	2	3	4	Total
Bulldogs	3	7	3	10	23
Trojans	14	3	14	0	31

at Los Angeles Memorial Coliseum, Los Angeles, California

- Date: August 31, 2019
- Game time: 7:30 p.m.
- Game weather: Hazy skies • Temperature: 72 °F (22 °C) • Wind: SW 6 miles per hour (9.7 km/h)
- Game attendance: 57,329
- Referee: Mike McCabe
- TV: ESPN

Game information

First quarter

- USC (10:34) – #18 JT Daniels to #7 Stephen Carr 8 yard pass TD
  (#40 Chase McGrath kick) – USC 7–0
- USC (7:45) – #7 Stephen Carr 14 yard run TD
  (#40 Chase McGrath kick) – USC 14–0
- FRST (3:42) – #28 Cesar R. Silva 45 yard Field Goal – USC 14–3

Second quarter

- USC (12:53) – #40 Chase McGrath 38 yard Field Goal – USC 17–3
- FRST (7:54) – #11 Jorge Reyna to #7 Derrion Grim 34 yard pass TD
  (#28 Cesar R. Silva kick) – USC 17–10

Third quarter

- FRST (8:29) – #28 Cesar R. Silva 47 yard Field Goal – USC 17–13
- USC (8:11) – #21 Tyler Vaughns 100 yard kickoff return TD
  (#40 Chase McGrath kick) – USC 24–13
- USC (1:51) – #29 Vavae Malepeai 2 yard run TD
  (#40 Chase McGrath kick) – USC 31–13

Fourth quarter

- FRST (12:27) – #28 Cesar R. Silva 28 yard Field Goal – USC 31–16
- FRST (6:39) – #11 Jorge Reyna to #8 Chris Coleman 8 yard pass TD
  (#28 Cesar R. Silva kick) – USC 31–23

Passing

- USC – #18 JT Daniels – 25/34 215 Yds – 1 TD 1 int
- FRST – #11 Jorge Reyna – 19/39 256 Yds – 2 TD 1 int

Rushing

- USC – #29 Vavae Malepeai – 23 Runs 134 Yds – 1 TD
- FRST – #11 Jorge Reyna – 20 Runs 88 Yds

Receiving

- USC – #21 Tyler Vaughns – 11 Rec 150 Yds
- FRST – #7 Derrion Grim – 2 Rec 86 Yds – 1 TD

=== Stanford ===
Stanford Cardinal at USC Trojans

Quarter	1	2	3	4	Total
No. 23 Cardinal	7	13	0	0	20
Trojans	3	21	7	14	45

at Los Angeles Memorial Coliseum, Los Angeles, California

- Date: September 7, 2019
- Game time: 7:30 p.m.
- Game attendance: 62,109
- TV: ESPN

Game information

First quarter

- USC (10:03) – #40 Chase McGrath 23 yard Field Goal – USC 3–0
- STAN (5:39) – #15 Davis Mills to #5 Connor Wedington 5 yard pass TD
  (#26 Jet Toner kick) – STAN 7–3

Second quarter

- STAN (14:56) – #22 Cameron Scarlett 3 yard run TD
  (#26 Jet Toner kick) – STAN 14–3
- STAN (13:47) – #26 Jet Toner 32 yard Field Goal – STAN 17–3
- USC (11:29) – #9 Kedon Slovis to #8 Amon-Ra St. Brown 39 yard pass TD
  (#40 Chase McGrath kick) – STAN 17–10
- STAN (8:00) – #26 Jet Toner 37 yard Field Goal – STAN 20–10
- USC (4:54) – #7 Stephen Carr 25 yard run TD
  (#40 Chase McGrath kick) – STAN 20–17
- USC (0:31) – #9 Kedon Slovis to #8 Amon-Ra St. Brown 7 yard pass TD
  (#40 Chase McGrath kick) – USC 24–20

Third quarter

- USC (0:44) – #29 Vavae Malepeai 4 yard run TD
  (#40 Chase McGrath kick) – USC 31–20

Fourth quarter

- USC (10:19) – #29 Vavae Malepeai 6 yard run TD
  (#40 Chase McGrath kick) – USC 38–20
- USC (6:01) – #9 Kedon Slovis to #21 Tyler Vaughns 16 yard pass TD
  (#40 Chase McGrath kick) – USC 45–20

Passing

- USC – #9 Kedon Slovis – 28/33 377 Yds – 3 TD
- STAN – #15 Davis Mills – 22/36 237 Yds – 1 TD 1 Int

Rushing

- USC – #29 Vavae Malepeai – 12 Runs 42 Yds – 2 TD
- STAN – #22 Cameron Scarlett – 17 Runs 82 Yds – 1 TD

Receiving

- USC – #21 Tyler Vaughns – 5 Rec 106 Yds – 1 TD
- STAN – #84 Colby Parkinson – 7 Rec 89 Yds

=== BYU ===
USC Trojans at BYU Cougars

Quarter	1	2	3	4	OT	Total
No. 24 Trojans	7	10	0	10	0	27
Cougars	10	7	0	10	3	30

at LaVell Edwards Stadium, Provo, Utah

- Date: September 14, 2019
- Game time: 12:30 p.m.
- Game weather: Mostly Sunny • Temperature: 80 °F (27 °C) • Wind: WSW 4 miles per hour (6.4 km/h)
- Game attendance: 62,546
- Referee: Scott Campbell
- TV announcers (ABC): Dave Pasch, Greg McElroy, Tom Luginbill

Game information

First quarter

- USC (10:39) – #9 Kedon Slovis to #6 Michael Pittman Jr. 8 yard pass TD
  (#40 Chase McGrath kick) – USC 7–0
- BYU (6:10) – #5 Ty'Son Williams 1 yard run TD
  (#39 Jake Oldroyd kick) – USC 7–7
- BYU (3:01) – #39 Jake Oldroyd 23 yard Field Goal – BYU 10–7

Second quarter

- USC (14:44) – #40 Chase McGrath 27 yard Field Goal – USC 10–10
- BYU (10:19) – #1 Zach Wilson to #82 Dax Milne 30 yard pass TD
  (#39 Jake Oldroyd kick) – BYU 17–10
- USC (5:03) – #29 Vavae Malepeai 5 yard run TD
  (#40 Chase McGrath kick) – USC 17–17

Fourth quarter

- USC (10:45) – #9 Kedon Slovis to #6 Michael Pittman Jr. 30 yard pass TD
  (#40 Chase McGrath kick) – USC 24–17
- BYU (8:13) – #39 Jake Oldroyd 32 yard Field Goal – USC 24–20
- BYU (5:41) – #1 Zach Wilson 16 yard run TD
  (#39 Jake Oldroyd kick) – BYU 27–24
- USC (1:43) – #40 Chase McGrath 52 yard Field Goal – USC 27–27

Overtime

- BYU – #39 Jake Oldroyd 43 yard Field Goal – BYU 30–27

Passing

- USC – #9 Kedon Slovis – 24/34 281 Yds – 2 TD 3 Int
- BYU – #1 Zach Wilson – 20/33 280 Yds – 1 TD

Rushing

- USC – #29 Vavae Malepeai – 13 Runs 96 Yds – 1 TD
- BYU – #5 Ty'Son Williams – 19 Runs 99 Yds

Receiving

- USC – #6 Michael Pittman Jr. – 9 Rec 95 Yds – 2 TD
- BYU – #18 Gunner Romney – 3 Rec 54 Yds

=== Utah ===
Utah Utes at USC Trojans

Quarter	1	2	3	4	Total
No. 10 Utes	7	3	7	6	23
Trojans	14	0	7	9	30

at Los Angeles Memorial Coliseum, Los Angeles, California

- Date: September 20, 2019
- Game time: 6:00 p.m
- Game attendance: 55,719
- Referee: Michael Mothershed (Pac 12)
- TV announcers (FS1): Joe Davis, Brock Huard, Bruce Feldman

Game information

First quarter

- USC (12:57) – #19 Matt Fink to #21 Tyler Vaughns 29 yard pass TD
  (#40 Chase McGrath kick) – USC 7–0
- UTAH (10:39) – #7 Devonta'e Henry-Cole 17 yard run TD
  (#97 Jadon Redding kick) – USC 7–7
- USC (8:11) – #19 Matt Fink to #8 Amon-Ra St. Brown 31 yard pass TD
  (#40 Chase McGrath kick) – USC 14–7

Second quarter

- UTAH (6:44) – #97 Jadon Redding 38 yard Field Goal – USC 14–10

Third quarter

- USC (9:54) – #19 Matt Fink to #6 Michael Pittman Jr. 77 yard pass TD
  (#40 Chase McGrath kick) – USC 21–10
- UTAH (3:47) – #1 Tyler Huntley to #89 Cole Fotheringham 2 yard pass TD
  (#97 Jadon Redding kick) – USC 21–17

Fourth quarter

- UTAH (11:57) – #97 Jadon Redding 24 yard Field Goal – USC 21–20
- USC (8:51) – USC Defense Safety – USC 23–20
- USC (6:58) – #30 Markese Stepp 4 yard run TD
  (#40 Chase McGrath kick) – USC 30–20
- UTAH (4:01) – #97 Jadon Redding 38 yard Field Goal – USC 30–23

Passing

- USC – #19 Matt Fink – 21/30 351 Yds – 3 TD 1 Int
- UTAH – #1 Tyler Huntley – 22/30 210 Yds – 1 TD

Rushing

- USC – #30 Markese Stepp – 3 Runs 11 Yds – 1 TD
- UTAH – #6 Devin Brumfield – 10 Runs 63 Yds

Receiving (halftime)

- USC – #6 Michael Pittman Jr. – 10 Rec 232 Yds – 1 TD
- UTAH – #89 Cole Fotheringham – 3 Rec 23 Yds – 1TD

=== Washington ===
USC Trojans at Washington Huskies

Quarter	1	2	3	4	Total
No. 21 Trojans	0	7	7	0	14
No. 17 Huskies	14	3	11	0	28

at Husky Stadium, Seattle, Washington

- Date: September 28, 2019
- Game time: 12:30 p.m.
- Game weather: 54 °F (12 °C) • Mostly cloudy • Wind @ 6 mph (10 km/h)
- Game attendance: 66,975
- Referee: Mark Duddy
- TV announcers (FOX): Joe Davis, Brock Huard, Bruce Feldman

Game information

First quarter

- UW (3:38) – #28 Richard Newton 1 yard run TD
  (#47 Peyton Henry kick) – UW 7–0
- UW (0:29) – #5 Andre Baccellia 0 yard fumble recovery TD
  (#47 Peyton Henry kick) – UW 14–0

Second quarter

- USC (4:14) – #19 Matt Fink 3 yard run TD
  (#40 Chase McGrath kick) – UW 14–7
- UW (0:00) – #47 Peyton Henry 28 yard Field Goal – UW 17–7

Third quarter

- UW (12:02) – #47 Peyton Henry 35 yard Field Goal – UW 20–7
- UW (4:56) – #26 Salvon Ahmed 89 yard run TD
  (2 pts conversion) – UW 28–7
- USC (2:10) – #19 Matt Fink to #6 Michael Pittman Jr. 44 yard pass TD
  (#40 Chase McGrath kick) – USC 28–14

Passing

- USC – #19 Matt Fink – 19/32 163 Yds – 1 TD 3 int
- UW – #10 Jacob Eason – 16/26 180 Yds

Rushing

- USC – #7 Stephen Carr – 7 Runs 94 Yds
- UW – #26 Salvon Ahmed – 17 Runs 153 Yds – 1 TD

Receiving

- USC – #6 Michael Pittman Jr. – 4 Rec 64 Yds – 1 TD
- UW – #2 Aaron Fuller – 6 Rec 68 Yds

=== Notre Dame ===
USC Trojans at Notre Dame Fighting Irish

Quarter	1	2	3	4	Total
Trojans	3	0	10	14	27
No. 9 Fighting Irish	0	17	3	10	30

at Notre Dame Stadium, Notre Dame, Indiana

- Date: October 12, 2019
- Game time: 4:30 p.m.
- Game weather: Clear and Cooling • Temperature: 51 °F (11 °C) • Wind: S 13 miles per hour (21 km/h)
- Game attendance: 77,622
- Referee: Michael Mothershed
- TV announcers (NBC): Mike Tirico, Doug Flutie, Kathryn Tappen (sideline) and Chris Simms (sideline analyst)

Game information

First quarter

- USC (2:13) – #40 Chase McGrath 40 yard Field Goal – USC 3–0

Second quarter

- ND (8:37) – #12 Ian Book to #84 Cole Kmet 10 yard pass TD
  (#39 Jonathan Doerer kick) – ND 7–3
- ND (4:38) – #25 Braden Lenzy 51 yard run TD
  (#39 Jonathan Doerer kick) – ND 14–3
- ND (0:15) – #39 Jonathan Doerer 45 yard Field Goal – ND 17–3

Third quarter

- ND (12:34) – #39 Jonathan Doerer 52 yard Field Goal – ND 20–3
- USC (8:53) – #40 Chase McGrath 27 yard Field Goal – ND 20–6
- USC (2:34) – #9 Kedon Slovis to #8 Amon-Ra St. Brown 38 yard pass TD
  (#40 Chase McGrath kick) – ND 20–13

Fourth quarter

- ND (13:47) – #39 Jonathan Doerer 43 yard Field Goal – ND 23–13
- USC (10:27) – #9 Kedon Slovis to #21 Tyler Vaughns 5 yard pass TD
  (#40 Chase McGrath kick) – ND 23–20
- ND (3:33) – #12 Ian Book 8 yard run TD
  (#39 Jonathan Doerer kick) – ND 30–20
- USC (1:04) – #30 Markese Stepp 2 yard run TD
  (#40 Chase McGrath kick) – ND 30–27

Passing

- USC – #9 Kedon Slovis – 24/35 255 Yds – 2 TD
- ND – #12 Ian Book – 17/32 165 Yds – 1 TD

Rushing

- USC – #30 Markese Stepp – 10 Runs 82 Yds – 1 TD
- ND – #6 Tony Jones Jr. – 25 Runs 176 Yds

Receiving

- USC – #8 Amon-Ra St. Brown – 8 Rec 112 Yds – 1 TD
- ND – #84 Cole Kmet – 6 Rec 61 Yds – 1 TD

=== Arizona ===
Arizona Wildcats at USC Trojans

Quarter	1	2	3	4	Total
Wildcats	0	0	0	14	14
Trojans	10	7	10	14	41

at Los Angeles Memorial Coliseum, Los Angeles, California

- Date: October 19, 2019
- Game time: 6:30 p.m.
- Game weather: Clear LA skies, 69 °F (21 °C)
- Game attendance: 53,826
- Referee: Kevin Mar
- TV announcers (Pac-12 Network): Roxy Bernstein (play by play), Anthony Herron (analyst), Jill Savage (sideline reporter)

Game information

First quarter

- USC (8:02) – #40 Chase McGrath 31 yard Field Goal – USC 3–0
- USC (0:23) – #9 Kedon Slovis to #6 Michael Pittman Jr. 9 yard pass TD
  (#40 Chase McGrath kick) – USC 10–0

Second quarter

- USC (1:07) – #30 Markese Stepp 12 yard run TD
  (#40 Chase McGrath kick) – USC 17–0

Third quarter

- USC (8:28) – #40 Chase McGrath 38 yard Field Goal – USC 20–0
- USC (3:29) – #9 Kedon Slovis to #21 Tyler Vaughns 5 yard pass TD
  (#40 Chase McGrath kick) – USC 27–0

Fourth quarter

- USC (13:13) – #23 Kenan Christon 55 yard run TD
  (#40 Chase McGrath kick) – USC 34–0
- AZ (12:12) – #17 Grant Gunnell to #5 Brian Casteel 56 yard pass TD
  (#43 Lucas Havrisik kick) – USC 34–7
- USC (8:20) – #23 Kenan Christon 30 yard run TD
  (#40 Chase McGrath kick) – USC 41–7
- AZ (0:28) – #17 Grant Gunnell to #5 Brian Casteel 27 yard pass TD
  (#43 Lucas Havrisik kick) – USC 41–14

Passing

- USC – #9 Kedon Slovis – 19/28 232 Yds – 2 TD
- AZ – #17 Grant Gunnell – 16/26 196 Yds – 2 TD 1 int

Rushing

- USC – #23 Kenan Christon – 8 Runs 103 Yds – 2 TD
- AZ – #21 J. J. Taylor – 16 Runs 80 Yds

Receiving

- USC – #21 Tyler Vaughns – 7 Rec 73 Yds – 1 TD
- AZ – #5 Brian Casteel – 5 Rec 105 Yds – 2 TD

=== Colorado ===
USC Trojans at Colorado Buffaloes

Quarter	1	2	3	4	Total
Trojans	7	7	7	14	35
Buffaloes	3	14	14	0	31

at Folsom Field, Boulder, Colorado

- Date: October 25, 2019
- Game time: 6:00 p.m.
- Game attendance: 48,913
- TV: ESPN2

Game information

First quarter

- USC (14:01) – #8 Amon-Ra St. Brown 37 yard run TD
  (#40 Chase McGrath kick) – USC 7–0
- COL (9:04) – #48 James Stefanou 22 yard Field Goal – USC 7–3

Second quarter

- COL (14:55) – #12 Steven Montez to #3 K.D. Nixon 7 yard pass TD
  (#48 James Stefanou kick) – COL 10–7
- COL (5:52) – #12 Steven Montez to #3 K.D. Nixon 7 yard pass TD
  (#48 James Stefanou kick) – COL 17–7
- USC (2:48) – #9 Kedon Slovis to #23 Kenan Christon 3 yard pass TD
  (#40 Chase McGrath kick) – COL 17–14

Third quarter

- COL (14:15) – #12 Steven Montez to #2 Laviska Shenault Jr. 71 yard pass TD
  (#48 James Stefanou kick) – COL 24–14
- USC (12:15) – #9 Kedon Slovis to #21 Tyler Vaughns 21 yard pass TD
  (#40 Chase McGrath kick) – COL 24–21
- COL (9:16) – #12 Steven Montez 17 yard run TD
  (#48 James Stefanou kick) – COL 31–21

Fourth quarter

- USC (11:25) – #9 Kedon Slovis to #6 Michael Pittman Jr. 44 yard pass TD
  (#40 Chase McGrath kick) – COL 31–28
- USC (2:15) – #9 Kedon Slovis to #6 Michael Pittman Jr. 37 yard pass TD
  (#40 Chase McGrath kick) – USC 35–31

Passing

- USC – #9 Kedon Slovis – 30/44 406 Yds – 4 TD 1 int
- COL – #12 Steven Montez – 27/43 324 Yds – 3 TD

Rushing

- USC – #23 Kenan Christon – 14 Runs 76 Yds
- COL – #8 Alex Fontenot – 16 Runs 57 Yds

Receiving

- USC – #6 Michael Pittman Jr. – 7 Rec 156 Yds – 2 TD
- COL – #2 Laviska Shenault – 9 Rec 172 Yds – 1 TD

=== Oregon ===
Oregon Ducks at USC Trojans

Quarter	1	2	3	4	Total
No. 7 Ducks	0	28	14	14	56
Trojans	10	7	0	7	24

at Los Angeles Memorial Coliseum, Los Angeles, California

- Date: November 2, 2019
- Game time: 5:00 p.m.
- Game attendance: 63,011
- TV announcers (FOX): Gus Johnson, Joel Klatt, Jenny Taft

Game information

First quarter

- USC (9:15) – #9 Kedon Slovis to #15 Drake London 8 yard pass TD
  (#40 Chase McGrath kick) – USC 7–0
- USC (3:00) – #40 Chase McGrath 24 yard Field Goal – USC 10–0

Second quarter

- ORE (10:11) – #10 Justin Herbert 10 yard run TD
  (#49 Camden Lewis kick) – USC 10–7
- ORE (2:36) – #30 Jaylon Redd 2 yard run TD
  (#49 Camden Lewis kick) – ORE 14–10
- ORE (2:16) – #25 Brady Breeze 32 yard interception return TD
  (#49 Camden Lewis kick) – ORE 21–10
- USC (0:20) – #9 Kedon Slovis to #6 Michael Pittman Jr. 13 yard pass TD
  (#40 Chase McGrath kick) – ORE 21–17
- ORE (0:08) – #2 Mykael Wright 100 yard kickoff return TD
  (#49 Camden Lewis kick) – ORE 28–17

Third quarter

- ORE (11:39) – #10 Justin Herbert to #6 Juwan Johnson 15 yard pass TD
  (#49 Camden Lewis kick) – ORE 35–17
- ORE (6:14) – #10 Justin Herbert to #6 Juwan Johnson 11 yard pass TD
  (#49 Camden Lewis kick) – ORE 42–17
- ORE (0:01) – #10 Justin Herbert to #6 Juwan Johnson 4 yard pass TD
  (#49 Camden Lewis kick) – ORE 49–17

Fourth quarter

- ORE (6:50) – #12 Tyler Shough to #4 Mycah Pittman 35 yard pass TD
  (#49 Camden Lewis kick) – ORE 56–17
- USC (3:11) – #9 Kedon Slovis to #81 Kyle Ford 20 yard pass TD
  (#40 Chase McGrath kick) – ORE 56–26

Passing

- USC – #9 Kedon Slovis – 32/57 264 Yds – 3 TD 3 int
- ORE – #10 Justin Herbert – 21/26 225 Yds – 3 TD 1 int

Rushing

- USC – #23 Kenan Christon – 15 Runs 79 Yds
- ORE – #26 Travis Dye – 12 Runs 75 Yds

Receiving

- USC – #21 Tyler Vaughns – 8 Rec 75 Yds
- ORE – #6 Juwan Johnson – 7 Rec 106 Yds – 3 TD

=== Arizona State ===
USC Trojans at Arizona State Sun Devils

Quarter	1	2	3	4	Total
Trojans	28	0	3	0	31
Sun Devils	7	6	7	6	26

at Sun Devil Stadium, Tempe, Arizona

- Date: November 9, 2019
- Game time: 12:30 p.m.
- Game weather: Mostly clear, 85 °F (29 °C)
- Game attendance: 54,191
- Referee: Mark Duddy
- TV announcers (ABC): Jason Benetti (play-by-play), Rod Gilmore (analyst), Quint Kessenich (sideline reporter)

Game information

First quarter

- USC (9:56) – #9 Kedon Slovis to #15 Drake London 8 yard pass TD
  (#40 Chase McGrath kick) – USC 7–0
- USC (6:14) – #9 Kedon Slovis to #23 Kenan Christon 8 yard pass TD
  (#40 Chase McGrath kick) – USC 14–0
- ASU (5:12) – #18 Joey Yellen to #10 Kyle Williams 5 yard pass TD
  (#45 Cristian Zendejas kick) – USC 14–7
- USC (2:36) – #9 Kedon Slovis to #23 Kenan Christon 58 yard pass TD
  (#40 Chase McGrath kick) – USC 21–7
- USC (0:03) – #9 Kedon Slovis to #8 Amon-Ra St. Brown 95 yard pass TD
  (#40 Chase McGrath kick) – USC 28–7

Second quarter

- ASU (6:47) – #18 Joey Yellen to #84 Frank Darby 62 yard pass TD
  – USC 28–13

Third quarter

- ASU (11:32) – #18 Joey Yellen to #2 Brandon Aiyuk 2 yard pass TD
  (#45 Cristian Zendejas kick) – USC 28–20
- USC (1:18) – #40 Chase McGrath 41 yard Field Goal – USC 31–20

Fourth quarter

- ASU (8:54) – #18 Joey Yellen to #84 Frank Darby 15 yard pass TD
  – USC 31–26

Passing

- USC – #9 Kedon Slovis – 29/39 432 Yds – 4 TD 1 int
- ASU – #18 Joey Yellen – 28/44 292 Yds – 4 TD 2 int

Rushing

- USC – #23 Kenan Christon – 20 Runs 62 Yds
- ASU – #3 Eno Benjamin – 20 Runs 52 Yds

Receiving

- USC – #8 Amon-Ra St. Brown – 8 Rec 173 Yds – 1 TD
- ASU – #84 Frank Darby – 3 Rec 86 Yds – 2 TD

=== California ===
USC Trojans at California Golden Bears

Quarter	1	2	3	4	Total
Trojans	10	7	17	7	41
Golden Bears	7	3	0	7	17

at California Memorial Stadium, Berkeley, California

- Date: November 16, 2019
- Game time: 8:00 p.m
- Game attendance: 46,397
- TV: FS1

Game information

First quarter

- CAL (12:05) – #26 DeShawn Collins 5 yard run TD
  (#39 Greg Thomas kick) – CAL 7–0
- USC (8:11) – #9 Kedon Slovis to #8 Amon-Ra St. Brown 18 yard pass TD
  (#40 Chase McGrath kick) – USC 7–7
- USC (0:07) – #40 Chase McGrath 41 yard Field Goal – USC 10–7

Second quarter

- CAL (9:22) – #39 Greg Thomas 37 yard Field Goal – USC 10–10
- USC (0:43) – #9 Kedon Slovis to #6 Michael Pittman Jr. 33 yard pass TD
  (#40 Chase McGrath kick) – USC 17–10

Third quarter

- USC (12:11) – #9 Kedon Slovis to #15 Drake London 8 yard pass TD
  (#40 Chase McGrath kick) – USC 24–10
- USC (7:20) – #40 Chase McGrath 32 yard Field Goal – USC 27–10
- USC (2:29) – #7 Stephen Carr 2 yard run TD
  (#40 Chase McGrath kick) – USC 34–10

Fourth quarter

- USC (10:12) – #9 Kedon Slovis to #83 Josh Falo 5 yard pass TD
  (#40 Chase McGrath kick) – USC 41–10
- CAL (8:24) – #26 DeShawn Collins 34 yard run TD
  (#39 Greg Thomas kick) – USC 41–17

Passing

- USC – #9 Kedon Slovis – 29/35 406 Yds – 4 TD
- CAL – #6 Devon Modster – 11/22 95 Yds – 2 int

Rushing

- USC – #23 Kenan Christon – 9 Runs 44 Yds
- CAL – #26 DeShawn Collins – 15 Runs 103 Yds – 2 TD

Receiving

- USC – #6 Michael Pittman Jr. – 11 Rec 180 Yds – 1 TD
- CAL – #2 Jordan Duncan – 5 Rec 53 Yds

=== UCLA ===
UCLA Bruins at USC Trojans

Quarter	1	2	3	4	Total
Bruins	7	7	14	7	35
No. 23 Trojans	10	14	14	14	52

at Los Angeles Memorial Coliseum, Los Angeles, California

- Date: November 23, 2019
- Game time: 12:30 p.m.
- Game attendance: 64,156
- TV announcers (ABC): Steve Levy (play-by-play), Brian Griese (analyst), Todd McShay (sidelines) and Molly McGrath (sidelines)

Game information

First quarter

- UCLA (11:08) – #1 Dorian Thompson-Robinson to #10 Demetric Felton
  9 yard pass TD (#17 JJ Molson kick) – UCLA 7–0
- USC (6:13) – #40 Chase McGrath 31 yard Field Goal – UCLA 7–3
- USC (1:40) – #29 Vavae Malepeai 1 yard run TD
  (#40 Chase McGrath kick) – USC 10–7

Second quarter

- UCLA (13:16) – #1 Dorian Thompson-Robinson 3 yard run TD
  (#17 JJ Molson kick) – UCLA 14–10
- USC (9:39) – #9 Kedon Slovis to #6 Michael Pittman Jr. 1 yard pass TD
  (#40 Chase McGrath kick) – USC 17–14
- USC (2:06) – #9 Kedon Slovis to #6 Michael Pittman Jr. 4 yard pass TD
  (#40 Chase McGrath kick) – USC 24–14

Third quarter

- USC (13:26) – #9 Kedon Slovis to #15 Drake London 32 yard pass TD
  (#40 Chase McGrath kick) – USC 31–14
- USC (8:20) – #29 Vavae Malepeai 8 yard run TD
  (#40 Chase McGrath kick) – USC 38–14
- UCLA (6:20) – #1 Dorian Thompson-Robinson to #86 Devin Asiasi
  53 yard pass TD (#17 JJ Molson kick) – USC 38–21
- UCLA (1:54) – #1 Dorian Thompson-Robinson to #23 Chase Cota
  7 yard pass TD (#17 JJ Molson kick) – USC 38–28

Fourth quarter

- USC (14:52) – #9 Kedon Slovis to #21 Tyler Vaughns 49 yard pass TD
  (#40 Chase McGrath kick) – USC 45–28
- UCLA (12:16) – #27 Joshua Kelley 1 yard run TD
  (#17 JJ Molson kick) – USC 45–35
- USC (8:39) – #7 Stephen Carr 2 yard run TD
  (#40 Chase McGrath kick) – USC 52–35

Passing

- USC – #9 Kedon Slovis – 37/47 515 Yds – 4 TD
- UCLA – #1 Dorian Thompson-Robinson – 26/44 367 Yds – 3 TD 1 int

Rushing

- USC – #29 Vavae Malepeai – 10 Runs 60 Yds – 2 TD
- UCLA – #27 Joshua Kelley – 15 Runs 45 Yds – 1 TD

Receiving

- USC – #6 Michael Pittman Jr. – 13 Rec 104 Yds – 2 TD
- UCLA – #86 Devin Asiasi – 5 Rec 141 Yds – 1 TD

=== Iowa ===
USC Trojans at Iowa Hawkeyes

Quarter	1	2	3	4	Total
No. 22 Trojans	7	10	7	0	24
No. 16 Hawkeyes	7	21	7	14	49

at SDCCU Stadium, San Diego, California

- Date: December 27, 2019
- Game time: 5:00 p.m.
- Game weather: 58 °F (14 °C), Fair, Wind SW 4 mph (6.4 km/h)
- Game attendance: 50,123
- Referee: Jerry Magallane
- TV announcers (FS1): Gus Johnson (play-by-play), Joel Klatt (analyst) Jenny Taft (sideline)

Game information

First quarter

- IOWA (8:25) – #3 Tyrone Tracy Jr. 23 yard run TD
  (#3 Keith Duncan kick) – IOWA 7–0
- USC (4:37) – #9 Kedon Slovis to #15 Drake London 4 yard pass TD
  (#40 Chase McGrath kick) – USC 7–7

Second quarter

- IOWA (11:22) – #6 Ihmir Smith-Marsette 6 yard run TD
  (#3 Keith Duncan kick) – IOWA 14–7
- USC (6:03) – #9 Kedon Slovis to #29 Vavae Malepeai 16 yard pass TD
  (#40 Chase McGrath kick) – USC 14–14
- IOWA (5:48) – #6 Ihmir Smith-Marsette 98 yard kickoff return TD
  (#3 Keith Duncan kick) – IOWA 21–14
- IOWA (1:18) – #4 Nate Stanley to #6 Ihmir Smith-Marsette 12 yard pass TD
  (#3 Keith Duncan kick) – IOWA 28–14
- USC (0:00) – #40 Chase McGrath 32 yard Field Goal – IOWA 28–17

Third quarter

- USC (13:29) – #7 Stephen Carr 2 yard run TD
  (#40 Chase McGrath kick) – IOWA 28–24
- IOWA (3:54) – #15 Tyler Goodson 1 yard run TD
  (#3 Keith Duncan kick) – IOWA 35–24

Fourth quarter

- IOWA (12:52) – #4 Nate Stanley to #12 Brandon Smith 6 yard pass TD
  (#3 Keith Duncan kick) – IOWA 42–24
- IOWA (1:43) – #49 Nick Niemann 25 yard interception return TD
  (#3 Keith Duncan kick) – IOWA 49–24

Passing

- USC – #9 Kedon Slovis – 22/30 260 Yards – 2 TD
- Iowa – #4 Nate Stanley – 18/27 213 Yards – 2 TD

Rushing

- USC – #29 Vavae Malepeai – 8 Runs 37 Yards
- Iowa – #15 Tyler Goodson – 18 Runs 48 Yards – 1 TD

Receiving

- USC – #8 Amon-Ra St. Brown – 9 Rec 163 Yards
- Iowa – #89 Nico Ragaini – 2 Rec 54 Yards

== Rankings ==
Ranking movements Legend: ██ Increase in ranking ██ Decrease in ranking — = Not ranked RV = Received votes
	Week																
Poll	Pre	1	2	3	4	5	6	7	8	9	10	11	12	13	14	15	Final
AP	RV	RV	24	—	21	RV	RV	RV	RV	RV	—	RV	RV	25	24	22	RV
Coaches	RV	RV	24	—	25	RV	—	—	—	—	—	—	RV	25	24	23	RV
CFP	Not released										—	—	23	22	22	22	Not released

== Statistics ==
Team statistics
	USC	Opponents
Scoring & Efficiency
Points	346	298
Total Time Possession	05:19:07	05:40:53
Average Time Per Game	29:01	30:59
First Downs	247	250
Rushing	79	106
Passing	174	114
Penalty	21	30
3rd–Down Conversions	45.8%	39.8%
3rd–Down Conversions Att-Comp	66–144	59–148
4th–Down Conversions	60.0%	50.0%
4th–Down Conversions Att-Comp	6–10	7–14
Red Zone Scoring	36/44	34/40
Red Zone Touchdowns	26	22
Penalties – Yards	80–799	88–749
Yards Per Game	72.6	68.0
Offense
Total Offense	4,903	4,442
Total Plays	760	780
Average Plays Per Game	69	70
Average Yards Per Play	6.4	5.6
Average Per Yards Game	445.7	403.8
Rushing Yards	1,670	2,105
Rushing Attempts	341	398
Average Yards Per Rush	4.1	4.6
Average Per Yards Game	126.1	167.5
Rushing TDs	14	14
Passing Yards	3,516	2,600
Att–Comp	419–294	382–232
Comp %	70.1	60.7
Average Per Pass Att	8.3	6.8
Average Per Catch	11.9	11.2
Average Per Game	319.6	236.3
Passing TDs	29	19
Interceptions	14	8
Defense
INT Returns: # – Yards	8–81	14–163
INT Touchdowns	0	0
Fumbles Recovered	7	8
Fumble recovery Touchdowns	0	0
QB Sacks: # – Yards	30–172	21–146
Touchdowns	0	0
Safeties	1	0
Blocked Kicks	2	0
Special teams
Kickoffs: # – Yards	67–3,951	63–3,767
Average Yards Per Kick	59.0	59.8
Touchbacks	26	20
Onside Kicks: # – Recovered	0–0	0–0
Punts: # – Yards	45–1,866	48–2,038
Average Yards Per Punt	41.4	42.4
Touchbacks	3	3
Kickoff Returns: # – Yards	38–805	33–918
Average Yards Per Return	21.1	27.8
Kickoff return Touchdowns	1	1
Punt Returns: # – Yards	18–115	8–58
Average Yards Per Return	6.39	7.2
Punt return Touchdowns	0	0
Field Goals: # – Attempts	12–13	18–24
Longest Field Goal: Yards	52	52
PAT: # – Attempts	44–44	31–32

Non-conference opponents

	1	2	3	4	Total
USC	24	13	24	24	85
All opponents	13	31	6	33	83

Pac-12 opponents

	1	2	3	4	Total
USC	82	56	58	65	261
Pac-12 opponents	45	70	53	47	215

All Opponents

	1	2	3	4	Total
USC	106	69	82	89	346
Opponents	58	101	59	80	298

=== Offense ===
Passing statistics
#	NAME	POS	RAT	CMP	ATT	YDS	Y/A	CMP%	TD	INT	LONG
18	JT Daniels	QB	130.47	25	34	215	6.32	73.53	1	1	28
9	Kedon Slovis	QB	162.94	223	315	2,727	8.65	70.79	24	9	95
19	Matt Fink	QB	142.02	46	70	574	8.2	65.71	4	4	77
	TOTALS		156.81	294	419	3,516	8.39	70.17	29	14	95
	OPPONENTS		130.13	232	382	2,600	6.80	60.73	19	8	71

Rushing statistics
#	NAME	POS	CAR	YDS	AVG	LONG	TD
29	Vavae Malepeai	TB	87	406	4.7	26	4
23	Kenan Christon	TB	66	364	5.5	55	2
7	Stephen Carr	TB	56	285	5.1	60	3
30	Markese Stepp	TB	48	307	6.4	35	3
27	Quincy Jountti	TB	13	38	2.9	6	0
16	Dominic Davis	TB	2	15	7.5	11	0
8	Amon-Ra St. Brown	WR	7	60	8.6	37	1
19	Matt Fink	QB	10	4	0.4	8	1
18	JT Daniels	QB	3	−6	−2.0	5	0
9	Kedon Slovis	QB	37	−35	−0.9	9	0
	TOTALS		341	1,670	4.1	60	14
	OPPONENTS		398	2,105	4.6	89	14

Receiving statistics
#	NAME	POS	REC	YDS	AVG	LONG	TD
6	Michael Pittman Jr.	WR	82	1,118	13.63	77	9
21	Tyler Vaughns	WR	62	752	12.13	41	5
8	Amon-Ra St. Brown	WR	60	751	12.52	95	6
1	Velus Jones Jr.	WR	6	35	5.83	8	0
15	Drake London	WR	27	391	14.48	45	3
81	Kyle Ford	WR	1	20	20.0	20	1
13	Munir McClain	WR	3	19	6.33	9	0
84	Erik Krommenhoek	TE	11	122	11.09	60	0
83	Josh Falo	TE	4	23	5.75	12	1
7	Stephen Carr	TB	18	116	6.44	15	1
29	Vavae Malepeai	TB	11	59	5.36	11	0
23	Kenan Christon	TB	8	99	12.38	58	3
–	Devon Williams	WR	1	11	11.0	11	0
	TOTALS		294	3,516	11.96	95	29
	OPPONENTS		232	2,600	11.21	71	19

=== Defense ===
Defense statistics
#	NAME	POS	SOLO	AST	TOT	TFL-YDS	SACK-YDS	INT	BU	QBH	FR-YDS	FF	BLK	SAF	TD
89	Christian Rector	DE	9	7	16	2.0–2	1.0–1	1	1	–	–	–	–	–	–
99	Drake Jackson	DE	23	16	39	10.5–52	4.5–36	–	3	–	–	1	–	1	–
51	Marlon Tuipulotu	DT	21	21	42	5.0–16	2.0–10	–	2	–	–	1	–	–	–
78	Jay Tufele	DT	17	17	34	5.0–25	3.5–20	–	1	1	–	–	–	–	–
91	Brandon Pili	DT	7	4	11	4.5–18	1.5–12	–	3	1	–	1	–	–	–
96	Caleb Tremblay	DE	10	6	16	3.0–21	2.0–18	–	–	1	–	–	–	–	–
50	Nick Figueroa	DE	5	5	10	2.0–6	2.0–6	–	1	–	1	–	–	–	–
90	Connor Murphy	DE	3	1	4	1.0–3	1.0–3	–	–	–	–	–	1	–	–
79	De'jon Benton	DT	0	2	2	0.0–0	0.0–0	–	–	–	–	–	–	–	–
10	John Houston Jr.	LB	57	36	93	6.5–13	2.5–8	–	3	–	1	–	–	–	–
26	Kana'i Mauga	LB	26	25	51	6.0–15	2.0–10	1	–	–	–	1	–	–	–
1	Palaie Gaoteote IV	LB	29	21	50	2.0–3	0.0–0	–	–	–	–	–	–	–	–
41	Juliano Falaniko	LB	4	6	10	0.5–1	0.5–1	–	–	–	1	–	–	–	–
31	Hunter Echols	LB	5	4	9	1.5–10	1.5–10	–	1	1	1	–	–	–	–
19	Ralen Goforth	LB	2	4	6	0.0–0	0.0–0	–	–	–	–	–	–	–	–
34	Eli'jah Winston	LB	2	3	5	1.0–2	0.0–0	–	–	–	–	–	–	–	–
42	Abdul-Malik McClain	LB	2	0	2	2.0–11	2.0–11	–	–	–	–	–	–	–	–
45	Maninoa Tufono	LB	2	0	2	0.0–0	0.0–0	–	–	–	–	–	–	–	–
18	Raymond Scott	LB	0	1	1	0.0–0	0.0–0	–	–	–	–	–	–	–	–
52	Spencer Gilbert	LB	1	0	1	0.0–0	0.0–0	–	–	–	–	–	–	–	–
2	Olaijah Griffin	CB	20	12	32	0.5–1	0.0–0	–	9	–	–	–	–	–	–
6	Isaac Taylor-Stuart	CB	24	8	32	1.0–1	0.0–0	–	4	–	–	–	–	–	–
8	Chris Steele	CB	21	6	27	1.0–1	0.0–0	–	4	–	1	–	–	–	–
9	Greg Johnson	CB	20	6	26	1.0–4	0.0–0	2	4	1	1	1	–	–	–
24	Max Williams	CB	5	1	6	1.0–3	1.0–3	–	1	–	–	1	–	–	–
13	Adonis Otey	CB	1	0	1	0.0–0	0.0–0	–	–	–	–	–	–	–	–
7	Chase Williams	DB	20	9	29	1.0–2	0.0–0	–	–	–	–	–	–	–	–
14	Jayden Williams	DB	4	1	5	0.0–0	0.0–0	–	–	–	–	–	–	–	–
22	Dorian Hewett	DB	7	2	9	0.0–0	0.0–0	–	1	–	–	–	–	–	–
15	Talanoa Hufanga	S	39	19	58	3.5–15	1.5–10	–	2	–	–	1	–	–	–
21	Isaiah Pola-Mao	S	34	22	56	4.5–24	1.5–13	4	1	–	–	–	–	–	–
28	C.J. Pollard	S	10	5	15	1.0–1	0.0–0	–	–	–	–	–	–	–	–
23	Kaulana Makaula	S	3	3	6	0.0–0	0.0–0	–	2	–	–	–	–	–	–
30	Jordan McMillan	S	5	1	6	0.0–0	0.0–0	–	–	–	–	–	–	–	–
25	Briton Allen	S	1	3	4	0.0–0	0.0–0	–	–	–	–	–	–	–	–
27	Quincy Jountti	TB	2	3	5	0.0–0	0.0–0	–	–	–	–	–	–	–	–
38	Alex Stadthaus	K	4	0	4	0.0–0	0.0–0	–	–	–	–	–	–	–	–
1	Velus Jones Jr.	WR	2	1	3	0.0–0	0.0–0	–	–	–	–	–	–	–	–
6	Michael Pittman Jr.	WR	3	0	3	0.0–0	0.0–0	–	–	–	–	–	–	–	–
21	Tyler Vaughns	WR	2	1	3	0.0–0	0.0–0	–	–	–	–	–	–	–	–
59	Damon Johnson	LS	1	1	2	0.0–0	0.0–0	–	–	–	1	–	–	–	–
62	Brett Neilon	C	2	0	2	0.0–0	0.0–0	–	–	–	–	–	–	–	–
70	Jalen McKenzie	OG	1	0	1	0.0–0	0.0–0	–	–	–	–	–	–	–	–
83	Josh Falo	TE	0	1	1	0.0–0	0.0–0	–	–	–	–	–	–	–	–
49	Michael Brown	K	1	0	1	0.0–0	0.0–0	–	–	–	–	–	–	–	–
73	Austin Jackson	OT	0	0	0	0.0–0	0.0–0	–	–	–	–	–	1	–	–
	TOTAL		457	284	741	67.0–250	30.0–172	8	43	5	7	7	2	1	-
	OPPONENTS		432	346	778	57.0–248	21.0–146	14	42	12	8	13	0	0	0

Key: POS: Position, SOLO: Solo Tackles, AST: Assisted Tackles, TOT: Total Tackles, TFL: Tackles-for-loss, SACK: Quarterback Sacks, INT: Interceptions, BU: Passes Broken Up, PD: Passes Defended, QBH: Quarterback Hits, FR: Fumbles Recovered, FF: Forced Fumbles, BLK: Kicks or Punts Blocked, SAF: Safeties, TD : Touchdown

=== Special teams ===
Kicking statistics
#	NAME	POS	XPM	XPA	XP%	FGM	FGA	FG%	1–19	20–29	30–39	40–49	50+	LNG	PTS
40	Chase McGrath	PK	44	44	100%	12	13	92.3%	0/0	4/4	4/4	3/4	1/1	52	80
	TOTALS		44	44	100%	12	13	92.3%	0/0	4/4	4/4	3/4	1/1	52	80
	OPPONENTS		31	32	92.3%	18	24	75.0%	0/2	1/1	8/11	6/7	3/3	52	85

Kickoff statistics
#	NAME	POS	KICKS	YDS	AVG	TB	OB
38	Alex Stadthaus	PK	50	3,007	60.1	18	0
49	Michael Brown	PK	16	929	58.1	8	1
40	Chase McGrath	PK	1	15	15.0	0	0
	TOTALS		67	3,951	59.0	26	1
	OPPONENTS		63	3,767	59.8	20	3

Punting statistics
#	NAME	POS	PUNTS	YDS	AVG	LONG	TB	I–20	50+	BLK
24	Ben Griffiths	P	45	1,866	41.4	55	3	21	8	0
	TOTALS		45	1,866	41.4	55	3	21	8	0
	OPPONENTS		48	2,038	42.4	63	3	22	11	0

Kick return statistics
#	NAME	POS	RTNS	YDS	AVG	TD	LNG
1	Velus Jones Jr.	WR	28	685	24.4	1	100
7	Stephen Carr	TB	6	106	17.6	0	33
21	Tyler Vaughns	WR	1	10	10.0	0	10
70	Jalen McKenzie	OG	1	4	4.0	0	4
6	Isaac Taylor-Stuart	CB	1	0	0.0	0	0
26	Kana'i Mauga	LB	1	0	0.0	0	0
	TOTALS		38	805	21.1	1	100
	OPPONENTS		33	918	27.8	1	100

Punt return statistics
#	NAME	POS	RTNS	YDS	AVG	TD	LONG
8	Amon-Ra St. Brown	WR	10	69	6.9	0	24
21	Tyler Vaughns	WR	7	46	6.5	0	14
6	Michael Pittman Jr.	WR	1	0	0.0	0	0
	TOTALS		18	115	6.39	0	24
	OPPONENTS		8	58	7.2	0	19

== Players drafted into the NFL ==
Round	Pick	Player	Position	NFL Club
1	18	Austin Jackson	OT	Miami Dolphins
2	34	Michael Pittman Jr.	WR	Indianapolis Colts
