= 2019 UCLA Bruins football team =

American college football season

2019 UCLA Bruins football
- Conference: Pac-12 Conference
- South Division
- Record: 4–8 (4–5 Pac-12)
- Head coach: Chip Kelly (2nd season)
- Offensive coordinator: Justin Frye (1st season)
- Offensive scheme: Spread option
- Defensive coordinator: Jerry Azzinaro (2nd season)
- Base defense: 4–2–5
- Home stadium: Rose Bowl

Uniform
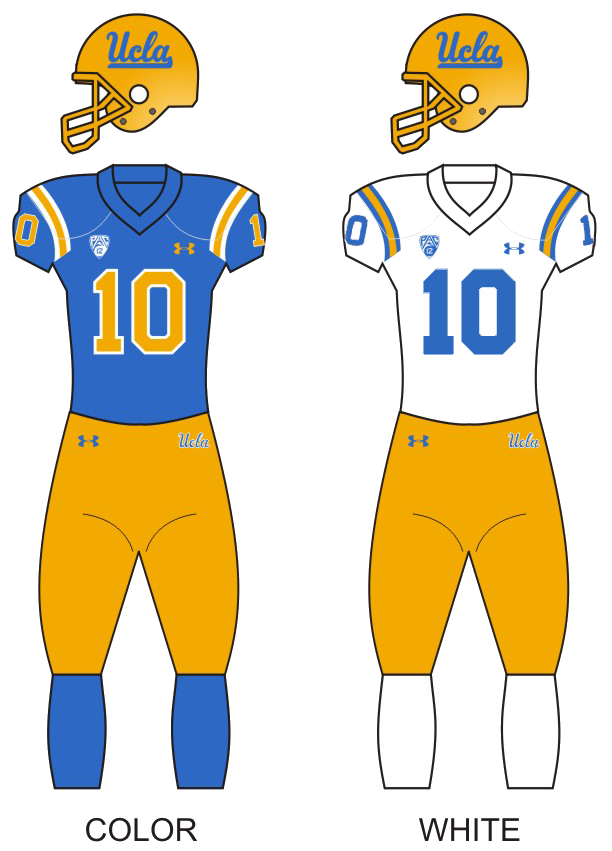

2019 Pac-12 Conference football standings
	Conf.			Overall
Team	W		L	W		L
North Division
No. 5 Oregon xy$	8	–	1	12	–	2
California	4	–	5	8	–	5
Washington	4	–	5	8	–	5
Oregon State	4	–	5	5	–	7
Washington State	3	–	6	6	–	7
Stanford	3	–	6	4	–	8
South Division
No. 16 Utah xy	8	–	1	11	–	3
USC	7	–	2	8	–	5
Arizona State	4	–	5	8	–	5
UCLA	4	–	5	4	–	8
Colorado	3	–	6	5	–	7
Arizona	2	–	7	4	–	8
Championship: Oregon 37, Utah 15
$ – Conference champion; x – Division champion/co-champions; y – Championship game participant; Rankings from AP Poll

The 2019 UCLA Bruins football team represented the University of California, Los Angeles in the 2019 NCAA Division I FBS football season. The Bruins play their home games at the Rose Bowl in Pasadena, California. UCLA competed as a member of the South Division of the Pac-12 Conference. The team was led by second-year head coach Chip Kelly. The Bruins began the season 1–5 before winning three straight games. However, the Bruins then lost their final three games of the season. They finished the season 4–8 overall and 4–5 in Pac-12 play, tying Arizona State for third place in the Pac-12 South Division, and were outscored by their opponents by a combined total of 417 to 320. The Bruins' average attendance at home was 43,848, their lowest since 1982 when they moved to the Rose Bowl, surpassing the previous low of 49,107 in 1995.

== Offseason ==
=== Coaching changes ===
Outside linebackers and special teams coach Roy Manning left to become the cornerbacks coach at Oklahoma. He was replaced by Jason Kaufusi.

=== 2019 NFL draft ===
Bruins who were picked in the 2019 NFL Draft:

Round	Pick	Player	Position	Team
7	254	Caleb Wilson	Tight end	Arizona Cardinals

== Preseason ==
=== Pac-12 media days ===
==== Pac-12 media poll ====
In the 2019 Pac-12 preseason media poll, UCLA was voted to finish in a tie for third with Arizona State in third place in the South Division.

=== Position key ===
Back	B	Center	C	Cornerback	CB	Defensive back	DB
Defensive end	DE	Defensive lineman	DL	Defensive tackle	DT	End	E
Fullback	FB	Guard	G	Halfback	HB	Kicker	K
Kickoff returner	KR	Offensive tackle	OT	Offensive lineman	OL	Linebacker	LB
Long snapper	LS	Punter	P	Punt returner	PR	Quarterback	QB
Running back	RB	Safety	S	Tight end	TE	Wide receiver	WR

=== Recruits ===
The Bruins signed a total of 15 recruits during the Early Signing Period.

College recruiting (2019)
Name	Hometown	School	Height	Weight	Commit date
Sean Rhyan; OT	San Juan Capistrano, California	San Juan Hills High School	6 ft 5 in (1.96 m)	302 lb (137 kg)	Dec 4, 2018
Sean Rhyan; OT	Recruit ratings: Scout: Rivals: 247Sports: ESPN:				
Shamar Martin; CB	San Diego, California	Morse High School	5 ft 11 in (1.80 m)	170 lb (77 kg)	Jun 23, 2018
Shamar Martin; CB	Recruit ratings: Scout: Rivals: 247Sports: ESPN:				
Charles Njoku; WR	Wayne, New Jersey	Wayne Hills High School	6 ft 4 in (1.93 m)	200 lb (91 kg)	
Charles Njoku; WR	Recruit ratings: Rivals: 247Sports: ESPN:				
William Nimmo; S	Santa Ana, California	Mater Dei High School	6 ft 1 in (1.85 m)	190 lb (86 kg)	Oct 25, 2018
William Nimmo; S	Recruit ratings: Scout: Rivals: 247Sports: ESPN:				
Duke Clemens; OT	Honolulu, Hawaii	Punahou School	6 ft 3 in (1.91 m)	268 lb (122 kg)	Jul 18, 2018
Duke Clemens; OT	Recruit ratings: Scout: Rivals: 247Sports: ESPN:				
John Ward; LB	Palmdale, California	Palmdale High School	6 ft 3 in (1.91 m)	227 lb (103 kg)	Jul 21, 2018
John Ward; LB	Recruit ratings: Scout: Rivals: 247Sports: ESPN:				
Datona Jackson; DE	Union City, Ohio	College of the Desert	6 ft 4 in (1.93 m)	270 lb (120 kg)	Dec 19, 2018
Datona Jackson; DE	Recruit ratings: Scout: Rivals: 247Sports: ESPN:				
Beau Taylor; OG	Las Vegas, Nevada	Bishop Gorman High School	6 ft 5 in (1.96 m)	286 lb (130 kg)	Jun 27, 2018
Beau Taylor; OG	Recruit ratings: Scout: Rivals: 247Sports: ESPN:				
Chase Griffin; QB	Hutto, Texas	Hutto High School	5 ft 10 in (1.78 m)	186 lb (84 kg)	Jun 15, 2018
Chase Griffin; QB	Recruit ratings: Scout: Rivals: 247Sports: ESPN:				
Siale Liku; DT	Oakland, California	Oakland High School	6 ft 3 in (1.91 m)	323 lb (147 kg)	Dec 19, 2018
Siale Liku; DT	Recruit ratings: Scout: Rivals: 247Sports: ESPN:				
Jahmon McClendon; RB	Spring Valley, California	Monte Vista High School	6 ft 2 in (1.88 m)	210 lb (95 kg)	Sep 18, 2018
Jahmon McClendon; RB	Recruit ratings: Scout: Rivals: 247Sports: ESPN:				
Carl Jones; S	Bakersfield, California	Bakersfield High School	6 ft 1 in (1.85 m)	194 lb (88 kg)	Dec 13, 2018
Carl Jones; S	Recruit ratings: Scout: Rivals: 247Sports: ESPN:				
Kain Medrano; WR	Pueblo, Colorado	East High School	6 ft 4 in (1.93 m)	205 lb (93 kg)	Jul 25, 2018
Kain Medrano; WR	Recruit ratings: Scout: Rivals: 247Sports: ESPN:				
Jaylen Erwin; WR	Charlotte, North Carolina	Hutchinson Community College	5 ft 11 in (1.80 m)	173 lb (78 kg)	Dec 19, 2018
Jaylen Erwin; WR	Recruit ratings: Scout: Rivals: 247Sports: ESPN:				
Noah Keeter; OLB	Gainesville, Florida	Buchholz High School	N/A	N/A	Dec 19, 2018
Noah Keeter; OLB	Recruit ratings: Scout: Rivals: 247Sports: ESPN:				
Hayden Harris; ATH	Sammamish, Washington	Eastside Catholic School	6 ft 5 in (1.96 m)	225 lb (102 kg)	Dec 19, 2018
Hayden Harris; ATH	Recruit ratings: Scout: Rivals: 247Sports: ESPN:				
Josh Carlin; OG	Chatsworth, California	Sierra Canyon School	6 ft 4 in (1.93 m)	277 lb (126 kg)	Dec 19, 2018
Josh Carlin; OG	Recruit ratings: Scout: Rivals: 247Sports: ESPN:				
Keegan Jones; RB	Sammamish, Washington	Eastside Catholic School	N/A	N/A	Dec 19, 2018
Keegan Jones; RB	Recruit ratings: ESPN:				
Michael Martinez; TE	Santa Ana, CA	Mater Dei High School	N/A	N/A	Dec 19, 2018
Michael Martinez; TE	Recruit ratings: ESPN:				
Overall recruit ranking:
Note: In many cases, Scout, Rivals, 247Sports, On3, and ESPN may conflict in their listings of height and weight.; In these cases, the average was taken. ESPN grades are on a 100-point scale.; Sources: "UCLA Football Commitments". Rivals.; "2019 Team Ranking". Rivals.com.

== Personnel ==
=== Coaching staff ===
Name	Position	Year at UCLA	Alma mater (year)
Chip Kelly	Head coach	2nd	New Hampshire (1990)
Justin Frye	Offensive coordinator/offensive line coach	2nd	Indiana (2006)
Dana Bible	Quarterbacks coach	2nd	Cincinnati (1976)
Jerry Azzinaro	Defensive coordinator	2nd	American International College (1982)
DeShaun Foster	Running backs coach	3rd	UCLA (2002)
Jimmie Dougherty	Wide receivers/Passing game coordinator	3rd	Missouri (2001)
Vince Oghobaase	Defensive line coach	2nd	Duke (2010)
Don Pellum	Linebackers coach	2nd	Oregon (1985)
Paul Rhoads	Defensive backs coach	2nd	Missouri Western (1988)
Jason Kaufusi	Outside linebackers coach	1st	Utah (2004)
Derek Sage	Tight ends coach/special teams coordinator	2nd	Cal State Northridge (2003)

=== Roster ===
2019 UCLA Bruins Roster
Quarterback: 1 Dorian Thompson-Robinson – Sophomore; 3 Chase Artopoeus – Freshman; 4 Blake Kirshner – Freshman; 7 Colson Yankoff – (redshirt) Freshman; 11 Chase Griffin – Freshman; 12 Austin Burton – (redshirt) Sophomore; Running back: 15 Martell Irby – Sophomore; 19 Kazmeir Allen – Sophomore; 22 Keegan Jones – Freshman; 24 Sitiveni Kaufusi – Freshman; 27 Joshua Kelley (redshirt) Senior; 28 Cole Kinder – (redshirt) Sophomore; 32 Christian Grubb – Freshman; 33 Jahmon McClendon – Freshman; Receiver: 2 Kyle Philips – (redshirt) Freshman; 9 Dymond Lee – (redshirt) Junior; 10 Demetric Felton – (redshirt) Junior; 14 Theo Howard – Senior; 15 Jaylen Erwin – Senior; 17 Josiah Norwood – (redshirt) Freshman; 18 Kain Medrano – Freshman; 20 Charles Njoku – Freshman; 21 Michael Ezeike – Sophomore; 23 Chase Cota – Sophomore; 26 Ashton Authement – Freshman; 29 Delon Hurt – Sophomore; 36 Ethan Fernea – Senior; 37 Hudson Habermehl – Freshman; Tight end: 81 Matt Lynch – (redshirt) Junior; 82 Josh Harris – Sophomore; 83 David Priebe – (redshirt) Freshman; 85 Greg Dulcich – (redshirt) Freshman; 86 Devin Asiasi – (redshirt) Junior; 87 Jordan Wilson – (redshirt) Junior; 88 Mike Martinez – Freshman; 89 Michael Churich – Freshman	Offensive lineman: 53 Luke Young – Freshman; 55 Michael Alves – (redshirt) Junior; 56 Brad Whitworth – Freshman; 57 Jon Gaines II – (redshirt) Freshman; 62 Duke Clemens – Freshman; 64 Sam Marrazzo – (redshirt) Sophomore; 65 Stephen DeFranco – (redshirt) Freshman; 66 Mohamed Khalil – (redshirt) Freshman; 66 Josh Carlin – Freshman; 70 Alec Anderson – (redshirt) Freshman; 71 Baraka Beckett – (redshirt) Freshman; 72 Zach Cochrun – (redshirt) Sophomore; 73 Jake Burton – (redshirt) Junior; 74 Sean Rhyan – Freshman; 75 Boss Tagaloa – Senior; 76 Christaphany Murray – Sophomore; 77 Beau Taylor – Freshman; 78 Lucas Gramlick – (redshirt) Freshman; Defensive lineman: 44 Martin Andrus, Jr. – Junior; 50 Tyler Manoa – Sophomore; 51 Ethan Matus – (redshirt) Freshman; 53 Winston Polite – (redshirt) Freshman; 55 Steven Mason – (redshirt) Junior; 56 Atonio Mafi – Sophomore; 58 Datona Jackson – Junior; 61 Carson Drake – Freshman; 90 David Vardanian – Junior; 91 Otito Ogbonnia – Sophomore; 92 Osa Odighizuwa – (redshirt) Junior; 93 Ulysses Aburto – Freshman; 94 Dovid Magna – Freshman; 97 Odua Isibor – (redshirt) Sophomore; 99 Elijah Wade – Sophomore	Linebacker: 2 Josh Woods – (redshirt) Senior; 11 Keisean Lucier-South – (redshirt) Senior; 12 Rahyme Johnson – Sophomore; 14 Krys Barnes – Senior; 25 Tyree Thompson – (redshirt) Senior; 26 Leni Toailoa – (redshirt) Junior; 29 Adam Cohen – Sophomore; 33 Bo Calvert – Sophomore; 39 Barret Albright – Freshman; 41 Jayce Smalley – (redshirt) Sophomore; 43 Je'Vari Anderson – Senior; 43 James Dinneen – Freshman; 45 Anthony James – Freshman; 46 Hayden Harris – Freshman; 47 Erich Osteen – Freshman; 47 Shea Pitts – (redshirt) Sophomore; 48 Noah Keeter – Freshman; 49 Jonny Garnett – Freshman; 52 Lokeni Toailoa – Senior; 54 John Ward – Freshman; 57 Connor Barbato – Freshman; 81 Kayden Hoal – Freshman; 95 Jason Harris – Graduate Student; Defensive back: 1 Darnay Holmes – Junior; 3 Rayshad Williams – (redshirt) Freshman; 4 Stephan Blaylock – Sophomore; 7 Morrell Osling III – Junior; 12 Elijah Gates – (redshirt) Sophomore; 19 Alex Johnson – (redshirt) Freshman; 19 Jelani Warren – Freshman; 23 Kenny Churchwell III – (redshirt) Freshman; 24 Jay Shaw – (redshirt) Sophomore; 27 Patrick Jolly, Jr. – (redshirt) Freshman; 28 Shamar Martin – Freshman; 30 Elisha Guidry – (redshirt) Freshman; 31 Zack Huffstutter – (redshirt) Freshman; 31 Kaleb Tuliau – Freshman; 32 William Nimmo, Jr. – Freshman; 35 Carl Jones – Freshman; 37 Quentin Lake – Junior; Punter: 49 Collin Flintoft – (redshirt) Freshman; 88 Wade Lees – Graduate Student; 99 Carson Olivas – Junior; Kicker: 2 Nicholas Barr-Mira – Freshman; 17 JJ Molson – Senior; 21 Quentin Wallace – (redshirt) Freshman; Long snapper: 30 Johnny Den Bleyker – Senior; 51 Jack Landherr IV – Freshman; 58 Koby Walsh – (redshirt) Junior

== Schedule ==
Date	Time	Opponent	Site	TV	Result	Attendance
August 29	4:00 p.m.	at Cincinnati*	Nippert Stadium; Cincinnati, OH	ESPN	L 14–24	38,032
September 7	1:15 p.m.	San Diego State*	Rose Bowl; Pasadena, CA	P12N	L 14–23	36,951
September 14	5:00 p.m.	No. 5 Oklahoma*	Rose Bowl; Pasadena, CA	FOX	L 14–48	52,578
September 21	7:30 p.m.	at No. 19 Washington State	Martin Stadium; Pullman, WA	ESPN	W 67–63	32,952
September 28	7:30 p.m.	at Arizona	Arizona Stadium; Tucson, AZ	ESPN	L 17–20	38,283
October 5	6:00 p.m.	Oregon State	Rose Bowl; Pasadena, CA	P12N	L 31–48	48,532
October 17	6:00 p.m.	at Stanford	Stanford Stadium; Stanford, CA (rivalry)	ESPN	W 34–16	31,464
October 26	4:30 p.m.	No. 24 Arizona State^{†}	Rose Bowl; Pasadena, CA	P12N	W 42–32	39,811
November 2	6:00 p.m.	Colorado	Rose Bowl; Pasadena, CA	P12N	W 31–14	47,118
November 16	5:00 p.m.	at No. 7 Utah	Rice–Eccles Stadium; Salt Lake City, UT	FOX	L 3–49	47,307
November 23	12:30 p.m.	at No. 23 USC	Los Angeles Memorial Coliseum; Los Angeles, CA (Victory Bell)	ABC	L 35–52	64,156
November 30	7:30 p.m.	California	Rose Bowl; Pasadena, CA (rivalry)	FS1	L 18–28	38,102
*Non-conference game; ^{†}Homecoming; Rankings from AP Poll and CFP Rankings after November 5 released prior to game; All times are in Pacific time

== Game summaries ==
=== At Cincinnati ===
UCLA at Cincinnati – Game summary

Quarter	1	2	3	4	Total
Bruins	0	7	7	0	14
Bearcats	7	3	7	7	24

at Nippert Stadium, Cincinnati, OH

- Date: August 29
- Game time: 7:00 p.m. EDT
- Game weather: 80 °F (27 °C); sun, clear
- Game attendance: 38,032
- Referee: Jay Edwards
- TV: ESPN

Game information

First quarter

- CIN – Josiah Deguara 16-yard TD pass from Desmond Ridder, Sam Crosa kick good, 7:09 (CIN 7–0)

Second quarter

- CIN – Crosa 44-yard field goal, 9:13 (CIN 10–0)
- UCLA – Demetric Felton 75-yard TD pass from Dorian Thompson-Robinson, JJ Molson kick good, 8:23 (CIN 10–7)

Third quarter

- CIN – Michael Warren II 12-yard TD run, Crosa kick good, 11:44 (CIN 17–7)
- UCLA – Chase Cota 7-yard TD pass from Thompson-Robinson, Molson kick good, 5:40 (CIN 17–14)

Fourth quarter

- CIN – Warren II 21-yard TD pass from Ridder, Crosa kick good, 14:51 (CIN 24–14)

Top passers

- CIN – Desmond Ridder – 18/26, 242 yards, 2 TD, 2 INT
- UCLA – Dorian Thompson-Robinson – 8/26, 156 yards, 2 TD, 2 INT

Top rushers

- CIN – Michael Warren II – 26 carries, 92 yards, TD
- UCLA – Demetric Felton – 23 carries, 71 yards

Top receivers

- CIN – Alec Pierce – 2 receptions, 59 yards
- UCLA – Demetric Felton – 2 receptions, 91 yards, TD

=== San Diego State ===
	1	2	3	4	Total
Aztecs	10	0	10	3	23
Bruins	7	0	7	0	14

=== Oklahoma ===
	1	2	3	4	Total
No. 5 Sooners	17	17	7	7	48
Bruins	0	7	7	0	14

=== At Washington State ===
	1	2	3	4	Total
Bruins	10	7	21	29	67
No. 19 Cougars	7	28	14	14	63

=== At Arizona ===
	1	2	3	4	Total
Bruins	7	0	10	0	17
Wildcats	0	6	7	7	20

=== Oregon State ===
	1	2	3	4	Total
Beavers	21	6	14	7	48
Bruins	0	10	14	7	31

=== At Stanford ===
	1	2	3	4	Total
Bruins	14	7	6	7	34
Cardinal	10	0	0	6	16

Dorian Thompson-Robinson returned from a leg injury the month before to throw for two touchdowns and run for another to lead UCLA to a 34–16 win over Stanford, ending their 11-game losing streak against the Cardinal. It was the Bruins longest against any opponent in their first 100 years of football. Joshua Kelley ran for 176 yards on 18 carries for the Bruins. Their defense limited Stanford to a season-low 198 yards and totalled seven sacks, almost equalling their previous season total of nine.

=== Arizona State ===
	1	2	3	4	Total
No. 24 Sun Devils	7	0	3	22	32
Bruins	14	14	14	0	42

Joshua Kelley ran 34 times for 164 yards and a career-high four touchdowns in a 42–32 upset over No. 24 Arizona State.

=== Colorado ===
	1	2	3	4	Total
Buffaloes	0	7	0	7	14
Bruins	17	0	7	7	31

The Bruins won 31–14 over Colorado for coach Chip Kelly's first three-game winning steak with the team. It was their fourth win of the season, exceeding their total from a year earlier. Thompson-Robinson returned from a knee injury the previous game to pass for 226 yards and two touchdowns, and added 38 yards rushing. Kelley rushed for 126 yards and two touchdowns. UCLA had 426 yards in total offense; they ran for over 200 yards for five consecutive games for the first time since 1978.

=== At Utah ===
	1	2	3	4	Total
Bruins	3	0	0	0	3
No. 7 Utes	7	21	7	14	49

The Bruins committed a season-high five turnovers in a 49–3 loss to No. 7 Utah. They fell behind 28–3 in the first half, when Thompson-Robinson committed two of his four turnovers. Three times in the half they were inside the Utes' 30-yard line, but managed just three points. They went scoreless in the final 51:55 of the game. Utes running back Zack Moss had 181 of his 200 all-purpose yards by halftime. For the contest, UCLA scored just once in four trips to the red zone, turning it over the other three times. They established a season low for points, and were held without a touchdown for the first time since a 50–0 loss to USC in 2011.

The Utes outgained the Bruins 536–269 in total yards. UCLA gained just 50 yards rushing against a defense that entered No. 1 in the nation against the run. Kelley had 78 yards rushing on 4.1 yards per carry.

=== At USC ===
	1	2	3	4	Total
Bruins	7	7	14	7	35
No. 23 Trojans	10	14	14	14	52

UCLA surrendered 643 total yards to No. 23 USC as the Bruins lost 52–35. Trojans quarterback Kedon Slovis set a USC school record with 515 passing yards, which was also the most in the rivalry's history. The Trojans established a school record with four receivers each catching for over 100 yards. The game began well for UCLA, who scored on their opening drive, like they had in their four previous wins on the season. They were up 7–3 late in the first quarter and driving on the USC 27 when Thompson-Robinson was intercepted. The Bruins were behind 24–14 at halftime. They drew to within 45–35 with 12:16 remaining in the game after scoring touchdowns on three straight possessions in the second half.

Kelley was held to 45 yards rushing after gaining a rivalry-record 289 a year before against the Trojans. With the defense focused on the Bruins running back, Thompson-Robinson compiled 431 yards in total offense along with four touchdowns. He was 26-of-44 passing for 367 yards and three touchdowns with one interception, and ran for 64 yards and another touchdown. The loss pushed UCLA out of contention for a bowl game, and assured them of four straight losing seasons for the first time since 1924.

=== California ===
California Golden Bears vs UCLA Bruins

Quarter	1	2	3	4	Total
Golden Bears	7	7	7	7	28
Bruins	7	3	8	0	18

at Rose Bowl, Pasadena, CA

- Date: November 30, 2019
- Game time: 7:30 p.m. PST
- Game weather: 49 °F (9 °C)
- Game attendance: 38,102
- Referee: Michael Mothershed
- TV announcers (FS1): Cory Provus, Petros Papadakis, Shane Vereen

Game information
First quarter
- UCLA – Jaylen Erwin 19-yard pass from Dorian Thompson-Robinson (JJ Molson kick), 8:26. UCLA 7–0. Drive: 7 plays, 54 yards, 3:35.
- CAL – Makai Polk 44-yard pass from Chase Garbers (Greg Thomas kick), 3:04. Tied 7–7. Drive: 8 plays, 91 yards, 2:33.

Second quarter

- CAL – Chase Garbers 1-yard run (Greg Thomas kick), 9:56. CAL 14–7. Drive: 10 plays, 72 yards, 4:57.
- UCLA – JJ Molson 31-yard field goal, 0:00. CAL 14–10. Drive: 14 plays, 54 yards, 3:33.

Third quarter

- CAL – Chris Brown Jr. 1-yard run (Greg Thomas kick), 05:38. CAL 21-10. Drive: 10 plays, 83 yards, 5:56.
- UCLA – Joshua Kelley 1-yard run (Delon Hurt pass from Dorian Thompson-Robinson), 02:26. CAL 21-18. Drive: 9 plays, 80 yards, 3:04.

Fourth quarter

- CAL – Chris Brown Jr. 10-yard run (Greg Thomas kick), 14:53. CAL 28-18. Drive: 6 plays, 75 yards, 2:33.

Statistics	CAL	UCLA
First downs	22	24
Total yards	412	401
Rushing yards	182	58
Passing yards	230	343
Turnovers	1	1
Time of possession	30:38	29:22

Team	Category	Player	Statistics
California	Passing	Chase Garbers	17/29, 230 yards, 1 TD, 1 INT
California	Rushing	Christopher Brooks	18 carries, 111 yards, 2 TDs
California	Receiving	Makai Polk	4 receptions, 78 yards, 1 TD
UCLA	Passing	Dorian Thompson-Robinson	23/39, 278 yards, 1 TD, 1 INT
UCLA	Rushing	Joshua Kelley	19 carries, 76 yards, 1 TD
UCLA	Receiving	Devin Asiasi	8 receptions, 99 yards

UCLA lost 28–18 to California to end their fourth straight losing season and second under coach Kelly. The Golden Bears, who entered with the worst offense in the Pac-12, were led by quarterback Chase Garbers's 230 yards passing and running back Christopher Brown Jr.'s 111 yards rushing and two touchdowns. UCLA lost their last three games, allowing an average of 43 points per game.

Kelley ran for 76 yards to become the eighth Bruin to run for 1,000 yards in consecutive seasons. The attendance of 38,102 gave UCLA an average home crowd of 43,848 for the season, its worst since moving to the Rose Bowl in 1982. Their previous low was 49,107 in 1995.

== Statistics ==
Statistics	UCLA	OPP
First downs	269	263
Plays–yards	916–4868	816–5475
Rushes–yards	490–1802	411–1746
Passing yards	3066	3729
Passing: comp–att–int	260-426-12	269-405-5
Turnovers		
Time of possession	364:22	355:36

== Awards and honors ==
- September 23, 2019 – Quarterback Dorian Thompson-Robinson was named Pac-12 Offensive Player of the Week, running back Demetric Felton was named the Pac-12 Special Teams Player of the Week, and wide receiver/returner Kyle Philips was named Pac-12 Freshman of the Week

== Players drafted into the NFL ==
Round	Pick	Player	Position	NFL Club
3	91	Devin Asiasi	TE	New England Patriots
4	110	Darnay Holmes	CB	New York Giants
4	112	Joshua Kelley	RB	Los Angeles Chargers
