= 2019 Stanford Cardinal football team =

American college football season

2019 Stanford Cardinal football
- Conference: Pac-12 Conference
- North Division
- Record: 4–8 (3–6 Pac-12)
- Head coach: David Shaw (9th season)
- Offensive coordinator: Tavita Pritchard (2nd season)
- Offensive scheme: Multiple
- Defensive coordinator: Lance Anderson (6th season)
- Base defense: 3–4
- Home stadium: Stanford Stadium

Uniform
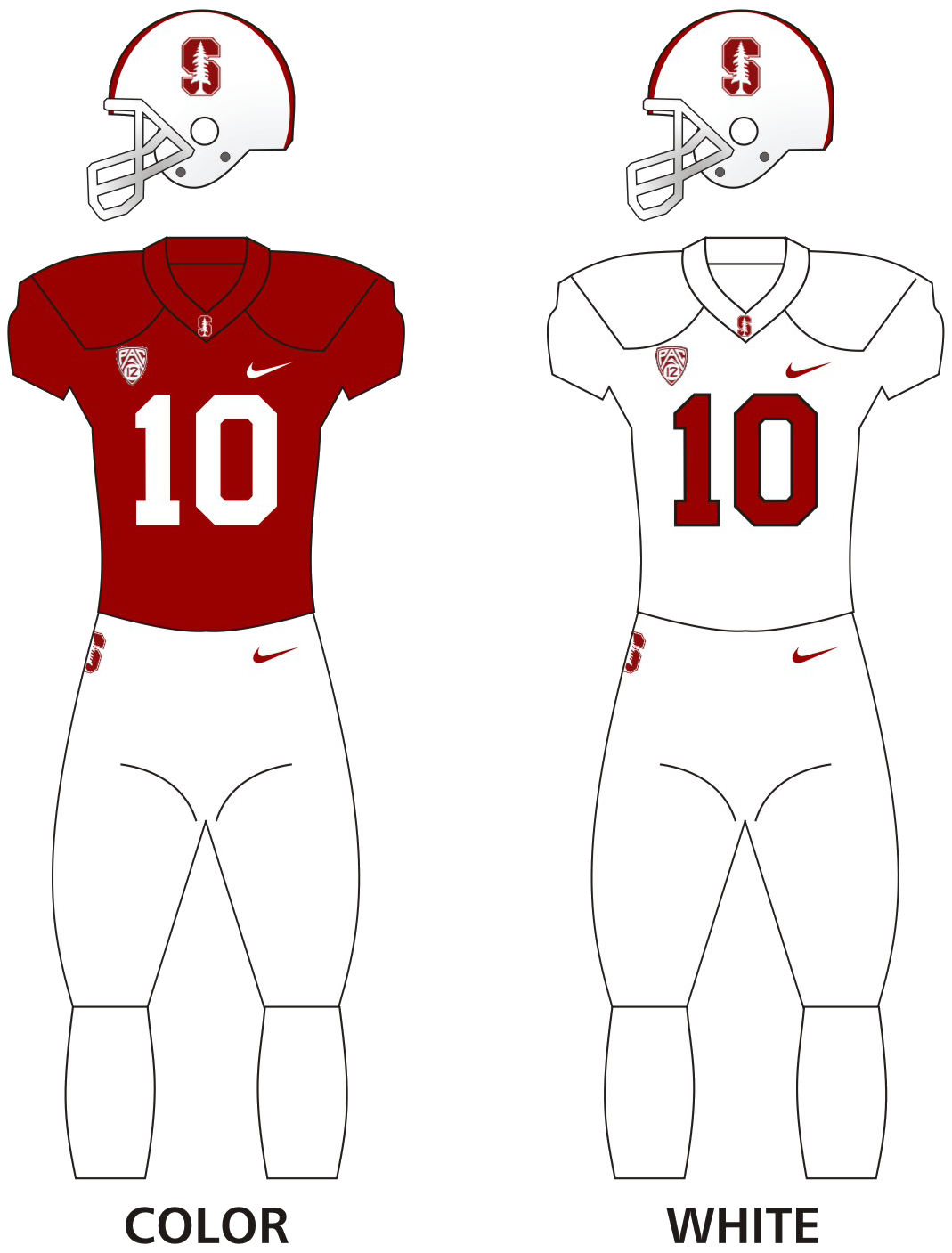

2019 Pac-12 Conference football standings
	Conf.			Overall
Team	W		L	W		L
North Division
No. 5 Oregon xy$	8	–	1	12	–	2
California	4	–	5	8	–	5
Washington	4	–	5	8	–	5
Oregon State	4	–	5	5	–	7
Washington State	3	–	6	6	–	7
Stanford	3	–	6	4	–	8
South Division
No. 16 Utah xy	8	–	1	11	–	3
USC	7	–	2	8	–	5
Arizona State	4	–	5	8	–	5
UCLA	4	–	5	4	–	8
Colorado	3	–	6	5	–	7
Arizona	2	–	7	4	–	8
Championship: Oregon 37, Utah 15
$ – Conference champion; x – Division champion/co-champions; y – Championship game participant; Rankings from AP Poll

The 2019 Stanford Cardinal football team represented Stanford University in the 2019 NCAA Division I FBS football season. The Cardinal were led by ninth-year head coach David Shaw. They played their home games at Stanford Stadium and were members of the North Division of the Pac-12 Conference. They finished the season 4–8, 3–6 in Pac-12 play, to finish last place in the North Division. This was Stanford's worst record since 2007 and the first time that they did not earn bowl eligibility since 2008.

== Preseason ==
=== Pac-12 media poll ===
In the Pac-12 preseason media poll, Stanford was voted to finish in third place in the North Division.

== Personnel ==
=== Coaching staff ===
Name	Position	Stanford years	Alma mater
David Shaw	Head coach	13th	Stanford (1994)
Lance Anderson	Defensive coordinator / outside linebackers coach	13th	Idaho State (1996)
Tavita Pritchard	Offensive coordinator/quarterbacks	7th	Stanford (2009)
Pete Alamar	Special teams coordinator	4th	Cal Lutheran (1983)
Ron Gould	Running backs coach	3rd	Oregon (1987)
Morgan Turner	Tight ends coach	7th	Illinois (2009)
Kevin Carberry	Offensive line coach	2nd	Ohio (2005)
Bobby Kennedy	Wide receivers coach	2nd	Northern Colorado (1989)
Duane Akina	Defensive backs coach	6th	Washington (1979)
Peter Hansen	Inside linebackers coach	6th	Arizona (2001)
Diron Reynolds	Defensive linemen coach	3rd	Wake Forest (1994)

=== Roster ===
2019 Stanford Cardinal football
Quarterback: 3 K. J. Costello – senior (6'5, 215); 10 Jack West – sophomore (6'4, 210); 15 Davis Mills – junior (6'4, 220); 17 Dylan Plautz – sophomore (6'2, 200); 18 Jack Richardson – senior (6'5, 213); Running back: 20 Austin Jones – freshman (5'10, 200); 21 Trevor Speights – senior (5'11, 209); 22 Cameron Scarlett – 5th year - Senior (6'1, 216); 25 Justus Woods – sophomore (6'1, 211); 28 Dorian Maddox – senior (5'10, 202); 30 Cameron McFarlane – sophomore (6'0, 200); 32 Nathaniel Peat – freshman (5'10, 190); Fullback: 24 Jay Symonds – sophomore (6'3, 247); 34 Houston Heimuli – junior (5'11, 244); Wide receiver: 2 Colby Bowman – freshman (6'2, 195); 4 Michael Wilson – sophomore (6'2, 200); 5 Connor Wedington – junior (6'0, 198); 6 Isaiah Brandt-Sims – 5th year – Senior (5'11, 183); 8 Donald Stewart – senior (6'4, 200); 9 Osiris St. Brown – junior (6'2, 186); 11 Harry Schwartz – senior (6'0, 189); 13 Simi Fehoko – sophomore (6'4, 210); 14 Cameron Buzzell – junior (5'10, 170); 19 Elijah Higgins – freshman (6'3, 215); 23 Marcus Graham – freshman (5'11, 170); 41 Diego Preciado – freshman (5'11, 175); 81 Brycen Tremayne – sophomore (6'4, 185); 86 Kale Lucas – sophomore (6'0, 190); Tight end: 44 TaeVeon Le – sophomore (6'4, 230); 80 Scooter Harrington – senior (6'5, 250); 84 Colby Parkinson – junior (6'7, 240); 85 Kyle McCombs – junior (6'5, 233); 87 Bradley Archer – freshman (6'4, 240); 88 Tucker Fisk – junior (6'4, 260); Placekicker: 26 Jet Toner – senior (6'4, 201); 37 Collin Riccitelli – senior (6'0, 196)	Offensive lineman: 50 Trey Stratford – OG/OT – sophomore (6'4, 258); 51 Drew Dalman – C – junior (6'3, 279); 55 Dylan Powell – OG/-C – senior (6'3, 281); 60 Drake Nugent – OG/-C – freshman (6'2, 280); 66 Branson Bragg – OG/-OT – freshman (6'4, 305); 70 Wakely Rush – OT – freshman (6'5, 240); 72 Walker Little – OT – junior (6'7, 313); 73 Jake Hornibrook – OG/-OT – freshman (6'5, 285); 74 Devery Hamilton – OT – senior (6'7, 287); 75 Walter Rouse – OT – freshman (6'6, 300); 76 Grant Pease – OT – sophomore (6'4, 250); 78 Henry Hattis – OT – senior (6'6, 291); 79 Foster Sarell – OT – junior (6'7, 314); Long snapper: 49 Kyle Petrucci – sophomore (6'6, 230); 69 Richard McNitzky – senior (6'1, 216); Punter: 14 Alex Gracey – sophomore (6'3, 195); 27 Ryan Sanborn – freshman (6'3, 205); Defensive linemen: 23 Ryan Johnson – DE – junior (6'4, 262); 34 Thomas Booker – DE – sophomore (6'4, 279); 50 Dalyn Wade-Perry – DT – junior (6'4, 316); 51 Jovan Swann – DE – senior (6'2, 271); 57 Michael Williams – DT – senior (6'2, 293); 58 Dylan Boles – DE – junior (6'4, 262); 91 Thomas Schaffer – DE – senior (6'7, 290); 93 Trey LaBounty – DE – sophomore (6'7, 235); 99 Bo Peek – DT – senior (6'3, 296)	Linebacker: 2 Curtis Robinson – ILB – senior (6'3, 232); 6 Andres Fox – OLB – sophomore (6'4, 240); 10 Jordan Fox – OLB – senior (6'3, 227); 14 Jacob Mangum-Farrar – ILB – sophomore (6'4, 223); 15 Stephen Herron – OLB – freshman (6'4, 238); 19 Joshua Pakola – OLB – freshman (6'3, 255); 20 Aenas Dicosmo – ILB – freshman (6'3, 220); 25 Andrew Pryts - ILB – senior (6'1, 222); 30 Levani Damuni – ILB – freshman (6'2, 235); 35 Tobe Umerah – OLB – sophomore (6'4, 239); 36 Tristian Sinclair – ILB – freshman (6'2, 205); 40 Anthony Trinh – OLB – senior (6'2, 239); 42 Caleb Phillips – OLB – junior (6'5, 215); 43 Ryan Beecher – ILB – 5th year – Senior (6'1, 245); 44 Caleb Kelly – OLB – sophomore (6'3, 213); 45 Ricky Miezan – ILB – sophomore (6'2, 248); 47 Tangaloa Kaufusi – OLB – sophomore (6'3, 245); 52 Casey Toohill – OLB – 5th year – Senior (6'4, 248); 56 Jake Lynch – ILB – sophomore (6'2, 220); 77 Thunder Keck – OLB – junior (6'3, 230); 90 Gabe Reid – OLB – junior (6'2, 231); Cornerback: 4 J.J. Parson – senior (5'10, 175); 5 Donjae Logan – sophomore (5'11, 178); 8 Treyjohn Butler – senior (5'11, 197); 11 Paulson Adebo – junior (6'1, 189); 13 Ethan Bonner – sophomore (6'1, 181); 17 Kyu Blu Kelly – freshman (6'1, 175); 21 Kendall Williamson – sophomore (6'1, 195); 22 Obi Eboh – junior (6'2, 194); 24 Nicolas Toomer – S – junior (6'2, 180); 28 Salim Turner-Muhammad – S – freshman (6'0, 185); 32 Jonathan McGill – S – freshman (5'10, 175); Safety: 3 Malik Antoine – FS – senior (5'11, 192); 9 Noah Williams – FS – junior (6'0, 191); 18 Stuart Head – SS – junior (6'4, 201); 26 Brock Jones – freshman (6'1, 185); 29 Spencer Jorgensen – freshman (6'2, 205); 38 Jason Kaul – freshman (6'4, 205)
Source and player details:

=== Depth chart ===
Starters and backups.

Defense

FS
Malik Antoine
Noah Williams
--

WLB	MLB	SLB
Jordan Fox; Gabe Reid	Curtis Robinson	Casey Toohill
⋅	Jacob Mangum-Farrar	Andres Fox
⋅	Andrew Pryts	--

SS
Stuart Head
--
--

CB
Paulson Adebo
Kendall Williamson
--

DE	DT	DT	DE
Jovan Swann	Trey LaBounty	Bo Peek	Thomas Booker
Thomas Schaffer	Dylan Boles	--	Ryan Johnson
--	--	--	--

CB
Obi Eboh
Treyjohn Butler
--

Offense

WR
Michael Wilson
Osiris St. Brown
Harry Schwartz

WR
Donald Stewart
Isaiah Brandt-Sims
Brycen Tremayne

LT	LG	C	RG	RT
Foster Sarell	Devery Hamilton	Drew Dalman	Dylan Powell	Walker Little
Jake Hornibrook	Trey Stratford	Branson Bragg	Wakely Rush	Henry Hattis
Grant Pease	Walter Rouse	Barrett Miller	--	--

TE
Colby Parkinson
Scooter Harrington
Tucker Fisk

WR
Connor Wedington
Simi Fehoko
Cameron Buzzell

QB
K. J. Costello
Davis Mills
Jack West

Key reserves
Offense
Defense
Out (Suspension)
Out (Season)
Out (Mission)
Out (Transfer)

Special teams
PK Jet Toner
PK Collin Riccitelli
P Alex Gracey
P --
KR Cameron Scarlett
PR Michael Wilson
LS Richard McNitzky
Kyle Petrucci
H --

RB
Cameron Scarlett
Dorian Maddox
Trevor Speights

- Projected Depth Chart 2019

True Freshman
Double Position : *

== Schedule ==
Date	Time	Opponent	Rank	Site	TV	Result	Attendance
August 31	1:00 p.m.	Northwestern*	No. 25	Stanford Stadium; Stanford, CA	FOX	W 17–7	37,179
September 7	7:30 p.m.	at USC	No. 23	Los Angeles Memorial Coliseum; Los Angeles, CA (rivalry)	ESPN	L 20–45	62,109
September 14	12:30 p.m.	at No. 17 UCF*		Spectrum Stadium; Orlando, FL	ESPN	L 27–45	44,206
September 21	4:00 p.m.	No. 16 Oregon		Stanford Stadium; Stanford, CA (rivalry)	ESPN	L 6–21	39,249
September 28	4:00 p.m.	at Oregon State		Reser Stadium; Corvallis, OR	P12N	W 31–28	32,326
October 5	7:30 p.m.	No. 15 Washington		Stanford Stadium; Stanford, CA	ESPN	W 23–13	33,225
October 17	6:00 p.m.	UCLA		Stanford Stadium; Stanford, CA (rivalry)	ESPN	L 16–34	31,464
October 26	12:30 p.m.	Arizona^{†}		Stanford Stadium; Stanford, CA	P12N	W 41–31	31,711
November 9	12:00 p.m.	at Colorado		Folsom Field; Boulder, CO	P12N	L 13–16	49,224
November 16	1:30 p.m.	at Washington State		Martin Stadium; Pullman, WA	P12N	L 22–49	32,952
November 23	1:00 p.m.	California		Stanford Stadium; Stanford, CA (122nd Big Game / Stanford Axe)	P12N	L 20–24	48,904
November 30	1:00 p.m.	No. 16 Notre Dame*		Stanford Stadium; Stanford, CA (Legends Trophy)	FOX	L 24–45	37,391
*Non-conference game; ^{†}Homecoming; Rankings from AP Poll and CFP Rankings after November 5 released prior to game; All times are in Pacific time

== Game summaries ==
=== Northwestern ===
	1	2	3	4	Total
Wildcats	0	0	0	7	7
No. 25 Cardinal	0	10	0	7	17

=== At USC ===
Stanford Cardinal at USC Trojans

Quarter	1	2	3	4	Total
No. 23 Cardinal	7	13	0	0	20
Trojans	3	21	7	14	45

at Los Angeles Memorial Coliseum, Los Angeles, California

- Date: September 7, 2019
- Game time: 7:30 p.m.
- Game attendance: 62,109
- TV: ESPN

Game information

First quarter

- USC (10:03) – #40 Chase McGrath 23 yard Field Goal – USC 3–0
- STAN (5:39) – #15 Davis Mills to #5 Connor Wedington 5 yard pass TD
  (#26 Jet Toner kick) – STAN 7–3

Second quarter

- STAN (14:56) – #22 Cameron Scarlett 3 yard run TD
  (#26 Jet Toner kick) – STAN 14–3
- STAN (13:47) – #26 Jet Toner 32 yard Field Goal – STAN 17–3
- USC (11:29) – #9 Kedon Slovis to #8 Amon-Ra St. Brown 39 yard pass TD
  (#40 Chase McGrath kick) – STAN 17–10
- STAN (8:00) – #26 Jet Toner 37 yard Field Goal – STAN 20–10
- USC (4:54) – #7 Stephen Carr 25 yard run TD
  (#40 Chase McGrath kick) – STAN 20–17
- USC (0:31) – #9 Kedon Slovis to #8 Amon-Ra St. Brown 7 yard pass TD
  (#40 Chase McGrath kick) – USC 24–20

Third quarter

- USC (0:44) – #29 Vavae Malepeai 4 yard run TD
  (#40 Chase McGrath kick) – USC 31–20

Fourth quarter

- USC (10:19) – #29 Vavae Malepeai 6 yard run TD
  (#40 Chase McGrath kick) – USC 38–20
- USC (6:01) – #9 Kedon Slovis to #21 Tyler Vaughns 16 yard pass TD
  (#40 Chase McGrath kick) – USC 45–20

Passing

- USC – #9 Kedon Slovis – 28/33 377 Yds – 3 TD
- STAN – #15 Davis Mills – 22/36 237 Yds – 1 TD 1 Int

Rushing

- USC – #29 Vavae Malepeai – 12 Runs 42 Yds – 2 TD
- STAN – #22 Cameron Scarlett – 17 Runs 82 Yds – 1 TD

Receiving

- USC – #21 Tyler Vaughns – 5 Rec 106 Yds – 1 TD
- STAN – #84 Colby Parkinson – 7 Rec 89 Yds

=== At UCF ===
	1	2	3	4	Total
Cardinal	7	0	3	17	27
No. 17 Knights	28	10	0	7	45

=== Oregon ===
Oregon Ducks vs. Stanford Cardinal – Game summary

Quarter	1	2	3	4	Total
No. 16 Ducks	7	7	0	7	21
Cardinal	3	0	0	3	6

at Stanford Stadium • Stanford, California

- Date: September 21, 2019
- Game time: 4:00 pm
- Game attendance: 39,249
- TV: ESPN

Game information

First quarter

- STAN – Jet Toner 32 Yd Field Goal, 8:43. Stanford 3–0. Drive: 12 plays, 61 yards, 6:17.
- ORE – Jaylon Redd 36 Yd pass from Justin Herbert (Camden Lewis Kick), 4:13. Oregon 7–3. Drive: 2 plays, 55 yards, 0:35.

Second quarter

- ORE – Jake Breeland 16 Yd pass from Justin Herbert (Camden Lewis Kick), 5:58. Oregon 14–3. Drive: 10 plays, 80 yards, 4:12.

Third quarter

- No scoring plays.

Fourth quarter

- ORE – Jake Breeland 24 Yd pass from Justin Herbert (Camden Lewis Kick), 10:40. Oregon 21–3. Drive: 5 plays, 50 yards, 2:01.
- STAN – Jet Toner 38 Yd Field Goal, 7:32. Oregon 21–6. Drive: 7 plays, 39 yards, 3:08.

Top passers

- ORE – Justin Herbert – 19–24, 259 yards, 3 TD
- STAN – K. J. Costello – 16–30, 120 yards, 1 INT

Top rushers

- ORE – C. J. Verdell – 24 carries, 82 yards
- STAN – Cameron Scarlett – 19 carries, 97 yards

Top receivers

- ORE – Jake Breeland – 5 receptions, 78 yards, 2 TD
- STAN – Michael Wilson – 5 receptions, 61 yards

=== At Oregon State ===
	1	2	3	4	Total
Cardinal	7	7	7	10	31
Beavers	0	0	7	21	28

=== Washington ===
Washington at Stanford – Game summary

Quarter	1	2	3	4	Total
No. 15 Huskies	7	3	3	0	13
Cardinal	3	10	7	3	23

at Stanford Stadium • Stanford, CA

- Date: October 5, 2019
- Game time: 7:30 pm PDT
- Game attendance: 33,225
- Referee: Kevin Mar
- TV: ESPN

Game information

Top passers

- UW – Jacob Eason: 16/36, 206 yards, 1 touchdown, 1 interception
- STAN – Davis Mills: 21/30, 293 yards, 1 touchdown

Top rushers

- UW – Richard Newton: 10 rushes, 64 yards
- STAN – Cameron Scarlett: 33 rushes, 151 yards, 1 touchdown

Top receiving

- UW – Aaron Fuller: 9 receptions, 171 yards
- STAN – Simi Fehoko: 3 receptions, 91 yards, 1 touchdown

=== UCLA ===
	1	2	3	4	Total
Bruins	14	7	6	7	34
Cardinal	10	0	0	6	16

=== Arizona ===
Arizona Wildcats (4–3) at Stanford Cardinal (4–3) – Game summary

Quarter	1	2	3	4	Total
Wildcats	10	14	7	0	31
Cardinal	7	24	7	3	41

at Stanford Stadium • Stanford, CA

- Date: October 26, 2019
- Game time: 12:30 P.M.
- Game weather: Sunny and clear, 75 °F (24 °C)
- Game attendance: 31,711
- Referee: Mark Duddy
- TV announcers (Pac-12 Network): Roxy Bernstein (play by play), Anthony Herron (analyst), Jill Savage (sideline reporter)

Game information

First quarter

- (12:07) ARIZ – Lucas Havrisik 29-yard field goal (Drive: 9 plays, 64 yards, 2:53; Arizona 3–0)
- (8:20) STAN – Cameron Scarlett 1-yard run, Ryan Sanborn kick (Drive: 8 plays, 75 yards, 3:47; Stanford 7–3)
- (2:55) ARIZ – Jalen Johnson 8-yard pass from Grant Gunnell, Lucas Havrisik kick (Drive: 8 plays, 65 yards, 2:41; Arizona 10–7)

Second quarter

- (14:54) STAN – Brycen Tremayne 14-yard pass from K.J. Costello, Ryan Sanborn kick (Drive: 7 plays, 49 yards, 2:50; Stanford 14–10)
- (7:55) STAN – Cameron Scarlett 8-yard run, Ryan Sanborn kick (Drive: 9 plays, 75 yards, 5:04; Stanford 21–10)
- (7:29) ARIZ – Khalil Tate 57-yard run, Lucas Havrisik kick (Drive: 2 plays, 75 yards, 0:26; Stanford 21–17)
- (4:36) STAN – Simi Fehoko 44-yard pass from K.J. Costello, Ryan Sanborn kick (Drive: 5 plays, 66 yards, 2:44; Stanford 28–17)
- (1:41) ARIZ – Jamarye Joiner 18-yard pass from Khalil Tate, Lucas Havrisik kick (Drive: 8 plays, 75 yards, 2:55; Stanford 28–24)
- (0:07) STAN – Ryan Sanborn 33-yard field goal (Drive: 10 plays, 60 yards, 1:34; Stanford 31–24)

Third quarter

- (9:32) ARIZ – Drew Dixon 9-yard pass from Khalil Tate, Lucas Havrisik kick (Drive: 8 plays, 73 yards, 2:37; Tied 31–31)
- (5:11) STAN – Simi Fehoko 14-yard pass from K.J. Costello, Ryan Sanborn kick (Drive: 8 plays, 65 yards, 4:21; Stanford 38–31)

Fourth quarter

- (6:18) STAN – Ryan Sanborn 21-yard field goal (Drive: 10 plays, 60 yards, 5:59; Stanford 41–31)

Statistics	ARIZ	STAN
First downs	29	26
Total yards	495	472
Rushing yards	37–222	31–160
Passing yards	273	312
Passing: Comp–Att–Int	24–40–2	30–43–0
Time of possession	25:29	34:31

Team	Category	Player	Statistics
Arizona	Passing	Khalil Tate	17/33, 205 yards, 2 TD, 2 INT
Arizona	Rushing	J. J. Taylor	16 carries, 107 yards
Arizona	Receiving	Tayvian Cunningham	4 receptions, 61 yards
Stanford	Passing	K.J. Costello	30/43, 312 yards, 3 TD
Stanford	Rushing	Cameron Scarlett	19 carries, 102 yards, TD
Stanford	Receiving	Simi Fehoko	3 receptions, 97 yards, 2 TD

=== At Colorado ===
	1	2	3	4	Total
Cardinal	3	3	0	7	13
Buffaloes	7	3	0	6	16

=== At Washington State ===
	1	2	3	4	Total
Cardinal	0	14	8	0	22
Cougars	13	9	10	17	49

Statistics

Statistics	STAN	WSU
First downs	23	33
Total yards	510	624
Rushing yards	6	104
Passing yards	504	520
Turnovers	2	1
Time of possession	26:06	33:54

Team	Category	Player	Statistics
Stanford	Passing	Davis Mills	33–50, 504 yards, 3 TD, 2 int
Stanford	Rushing	Osiris St. Brown	1 rush, 8 yards
Stanford	Receiving	Connor Weddington	8 receptions, 119 yards
Washington State	Passing	Anthony Gordon	44–60, 520 yards, 5 TD, int
Washington State	Rushing	Max Borghi	15 rushes, 111 yards, TD
Washington State	Receiving	Brandon Arconado	9 receptions, 148 yards, TD

Quarterback Davis Mills set a school record during the game, throwing for 504 yards.

=== California ===
California Golden Bears vs. Stanford Cardinal – Game summary

Quarter	1	2	3	4	Total
Golden Bears	7	3	0	14	24
Cardinal	7	3	7	3	20

at Stanford Stadium • Stanford, California

- Date: November 23, 2019
- Game time: 1:00 p.m. PST
- Game attendance: 48,904
- Referee: Chris Coyte
- TV: P12N
- Reference

Game information

First quarter

- STAN – Donald Stewart 40-yard pass from Davis Mills (Ryan Sanborn kick), 13:00. Stanford 7–0. Drive: 4 plays, 60 yards, 2:00.
- CAL – Christopher Brown 7-yard run (Greg Thomas kick), 0:45. Tied 7–7. Drive: 13 plays, 90 yards, 6:02.

Second quarter

- STAN – Ryan Sanborn 48-yard field goal, 11:45. Stanford 10–7. Drive: 8 plays, 52 yards, 3:59.
- CAL – Greg Thomas 49-yard field goal, 7:37. Tied 10–10. Drive: 9 plays, 43 yards, 4:08.

Third quarter

- STAN – Cameron Scarlett 1-yard run (Ryan Sanborn kick), 2:09. Stanford 17–10. Drive: 6 plays, 30 yards, 2:59.

Fourth quarter

- CAL – Nikko Remigio 18-yard pass from Chase Garbers (Greg Thomas kick), 7:44. Tied 17–17. Drive: 5 plays, 84 yards, 2:15.
- STAN – Ryan Sanborn 44-yard field goal, 2:23. Stanford 20–17. Drive: 10 plays, 39 yards, 5:17.
- CAL – Chase Garbers 16-yard run (Greg Thomas kick), 1:19. California 24–20. Drive: 6 plays, 75 yards, 1:04.

Top passers

- CAL – Chase Garbers – 20/30, 285 yards, TD
- STAN – Davis Mills – 26/35, 290 yards, TD, 2 int

Top rushers

- CAL – Chase Garbers – 13 rushes, 72 yards, TD
- STAN – Cameron Scarlett – 12 rushes, 31 yards, TD

Top receivers

- CAL – Nikko Remigio – 9 receptions, 157 yards, TD
- STAN – Michael Wilson – 6 receptions, 63 yards

=== Notre Dame ===
	1	2	3	4	Total
No. 16 Fighting Irish	7	14	7	17	45
Cardinal	10	7	0	7	24

== Rankings ==
Ranking movements Legend: ██ Increase in ranking ██ Decrease in ranking — = Not ranked RV = Received votes
	Week															
Poll	Pre	1	2	3	4	5	6	7	8	9	10	11	12	13	14	Final
AP	25	23	—	—	—	—	—	—	—	—	—	—	—	—	—	
Coaches	23	23	RV	—	—	—	—	—	—	—	—	—	—	—	—	
CFP	Not released										—	—	—	—		Not released

== Players drafted into the NFL ==
Round	Pick	Player	Position	NFL club
4	133	Colby Parkinson	TE	Seattle Seahawks
7	233	Casey Toohill	DE	Philadelphia Eagles
