= Chase Artopoeus =

American football player (born 2001)

No. 12
- Position: Quarterback

Personal information
- Born: February 10, 2001 (age 25)
- Listed height: 6 ft 1 in (1.85 m)
- Listed weight: 206 lb (93 kg)

Career information
- High school: St. Joseph (Santa Maria, California)
- College: UCLA (2019–2022); Chattanooga (2023–2024)
- NFL draft: 2025: undrafted

Career history
- Winnipeg Blue Bombers (2025)

Career CFL statistics
- Games played: 6

Chase Artopoeus (born February 10, 2001) is an American former professional football quarterback. He played college football for the UCLA Bruins and the Chattanooga Mocs. Artopeus was also a member of the Winnipeg Blue Bombers in the Canadian Football League (CFL).

== College career ==
Artopoeus played college football for the UCLA Bruins from 2019 to 2022 and the Chattanooga Mocs 2023 to 2024. In his four seasons at UCLA he appeared in two games as a quarterback while also earning scout team player of the year honors. After graduating, Artopoeus transferred from UCLA to Chattanooga. Over the next two seasons, Artopoeus appeared in 18 games as a starter, going 12-6 and recording 4,633 passing yards, 31 passing touchdowns, 235 rushing yards and seven rushing touchdowns. Artopoeus' 281 yards per game his junior year have him for the 3rd most yards per game by a Chattanooga quarterback in program history. In his junior year, Artopoeus was credited as leading the Mocs to their first playoff appearance in almost a decade and was recognized by PFF as one of the top 10 highest graded quarterbacks in the FCS that season.

== Professional career ==
Pre-draft measurables
Height	Weight	Arm length	Hand span	Wingspan	40-yard dash	10-yard split	20-yard split	20-yard shuttle	Three-cone drill	Vertical jump	Broad jump
6 ft 1 in (1.85 m)	216 lb (98 kg)	31 1/8 in (0.79 m)	9 in (0.23 m)	6 ft 1 1/2 in (1.87 m)	4.96 s	1.68 s	2.76 s	4.33 s	7.30 s	32.5 in (0.83 m)	9 ft 11 in (3.02 m)
All values from Pro Day

On May 1, 2025, Artopoeus was signed by the Winnipeg Blue Bombers. He dressed for six games his rookie season but did not record any statistics. On March 10, 2026, Artopeus announced his retirement from professional football.
