= Devin Asiasi =

American football player (born 1997)

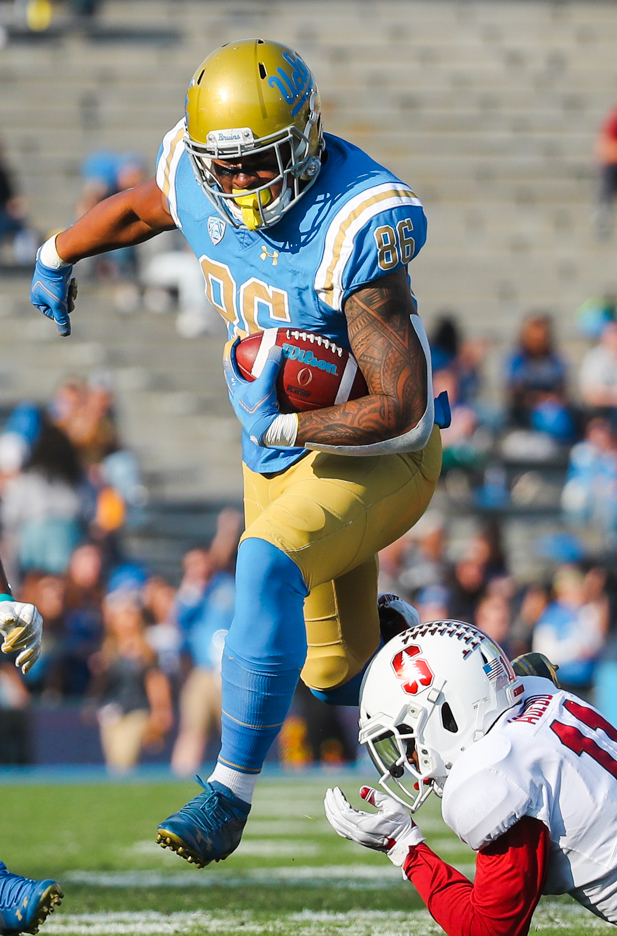
- Asiasi with the UCLA Bruins in 2018

Profile
- Position: Tight end

Personal information
- Born: August 14, 1997 (age 29); San Mateo, California, U.S.
- Listed height: 6 ft 3 in (1.91 m)
- Listed weight: 260 lb (118 kg)

Career information
- High school: De La Salle (Concord, California)
- College: Michigan (2016); UCLA (2017–2019)
- NFL draft: 2020: 3rd round, 91st overall pick

Career history
- New England Patriots (2020–2021); Cincinnati Bengals (2022); Cleveland Browns (2023)*; Tennessee Titans (2023)*; DC Defenders (2025)*
- * Offseason or practice squad member only

Career NFL statistics as of 2023
- Receptions: 4
- Receiving yards: 44
- Receiving touchdowns: 1
- Stats at Pro Football Reference

Devin Timothy Soane Asiasi (born August 14, 1997) is an American professional football tight end. He played college football at UCLA. He was selected by the New England Patriots in the third round of the 2020 NFL draft.

== Early life ==
Born in San Mateo, California and raised in the Shoreview community, Asiasi played high school football on both offense and defense at De La Salle High School in Concord, California. During his senior season, he hauled in 17 catches for 311 yards and five touchdowns on offense, and finished with 49 tackles, five pass breakups and four sacks on defense. He participated in the 2016 U.S. Army All-American Bowl.

He was rated as a four-star prospect by ESPN.com, Rivals.com, and Scout.com, and was ranked by ESPN as the No. 3 tight end in college football's incoming Class of 2016 and the No. 44 overall player in the 2016 ESPN 300.

== College career ==
=== Michigan ===
Asiasi was personally recruited by Michigan head coach Jim Harbaugh during a visit to De La Salle High School in January 2016. On February 3, 2016, he committed to play college football for the Michigan Wolverines.

On September 24, 2016, Asiasi scored his first college touchdown in a victory over Penn State. He finished the season with two catches for 18 yards and one touchdown.

Following his freshman season, Asiasi transferred to UCLA. He transferred to be closer to his home in San Mateo, California.

=== UCLA ===
After sitting out the 2017 season due to transfer rules, Asiasi made his debut for the Bruins in 2018. He finished the season with six receptions for 130 yards and one touchdown.

He saw a much greater role in 2019, playing in 12 games and netting 44 receptions for 641 yards and 4 touchdowns. He had 141 yards against USC, his first 100-yard game.

== Professional career ==
Pre-draft measurables
| Height | Weight | Arm length | Hand span | Wingspan | 40-yard dash | 10-yard split | 20-yard split | Vertical jump | Broad jump | Bench press |
|---|---|---|---|---|---|---|---|---|---|---|
| 6 ft 3 in (1.91 m) | 257 lb (117 kg) | 33 1/4 in (0.84 m) | 9 3/4 in (0.25 m) | 6 ft 8 1/8 in (2.04 m) | 4.73 s | 1.62 s | 2.75 s | 30.5 in (0.77 m) | 9 ft 7 in (2.92 m) | 16 reps |
All values from NFL Combine

=== New England Patriots ===
Asiasi was selected in the third round of the 2020 NFL draft by the New England Patriots with the 91st overall pick. He was placed on injured reserve on November 3, 2020. Asiasi was activated off of injured reserve on December 10. During the Patriots' Week 17 game against the New York Jets on January 3, 2021, Asiasi recorded the first two receptions of his career and his first receiving touchdown during the 28–14 win.

On August 30, 2022, Asiasi was waived by the Patriots.

=== Cincinnati Bengals ===
On August 31, 2022, Asiasi was claimed off waivers by the Cincinnati Bengals. Asiasi was waived by the Bengals on August 29, 2023 as part of their 53-man roster cutdown.

=== Cleveland Browns ===
On September 26, 2023, Asiasi signed with the practice squad of the Cleveland Browns. He was released on November 7.

=== Tennessee Titans ===
On December 26, 2023, Asiasi was signed to the Tennessee Titans' practice squad. He was not signed to a reserve/future contract and thus became a free agent when his contract expired at the end of the season.

=== DC Defenders ===
On January 31, 2025, Asiasi signed with the DC Defenders of the United Football League (UFL). He was released by the Defenders on March 20.

== Career statistics ==
=== NFL ===
| Year | Team | Games | | Receiving | | | | | |
| Year | Team | GP | GS | Tgt | Rec | Yds | Avg | Lng | TD |
|---|---|---|---|---|---|---|---|---|---|
| 2020 | NE | 9 | 3 | 7 | 2 | 39 | 19.5 | 26 | 1 |
| 2021 | NE | 1 | 0 | 0 | 0 | 0 | 0.0 | 0 | 0 |
| 2022 | CIN | 12 | 0 | 2 | 2 | 5 | 2.5 | 6 | 0 |
| Career | | 22 | 3 | 9 | 4 | 44 | 11.0 | 26 | 1 |

=== College ===
| Season | Team | Class | GP | Receiving | | | |
| Season | Team | Class | GP | Rec | Yds | Avg | TD |
|---|---|---|---|---|---|---|---|
| 2016 | Michigan | FR | 2 | 2 | 18 | 9.0 | 1 |
| 2018 | UCLA | SO | 4 | 6 | 130 | 21.7 | 1 |
| 2019 | UCLA | JR | 12 | 44 | 641 | 14.6 | 4 |
| Career | | | 18 | 52 | 789 | 15.2 | 6 |

== Personal life ==
Asiasi is of Samoan and Tongan descent.
