= 2019 Air Force Falcons football team =

American college football season

2019 Air Force Falcons football

Cheez-It Bowl champion

Cheez-It Bowl, W 31–21 vs. Washington State
- Conference: Mountain West Conference
- Mountain Division

Ranking
- Coaches: No. 23
- AP: No. 22
- Record: 11–2 (7–1 MW)
- Head coach: Troy Calhoun (13th season)
- Offensive coordinator: Mike Thiessen (11th season)
- Offensive scheme: Triple option
- Defensive coordinator: John Rudzinski (2nd season)
- Base defense: Multiple
- Captains: Jeremy Fejedelem; Mosese Fifita; Donald Hammond III; Scott Hattok; Jordan Jackson; Kyle Johnson
- Home stadium: Falcon Stadium

Uniform
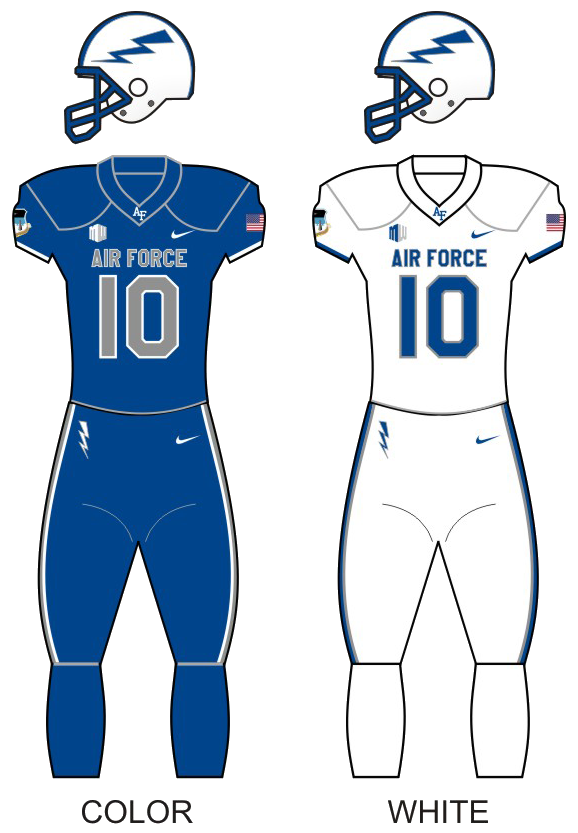

2019 Mountain West Conference football standings
| | Conf. | | | Overall |
| Team | W | | L | W | | L |
|---|---|---|---|---|---|---|
Mountain Division
| No. 23 Boise State xy$ | 8 | – | 0 | 12 | – | 2 |
| No. 22 Air Force | 7 | – | 1 | 11 | – | 2 |
| Utah State | 6 | – | 2 | 7 | – | 6 |
| Wyoming | 4 | – | 4 | 8 | – | 5 |
| Colorado State | 3 | – | 5 | 4 | – | 8 |
| New Mexico | 0 | – | 8 | 2 | – | 10 |
West Division
| Hawaii xy | 5 | – | 3 | 10 | – | 5 |
| San Diego State x | 5 | – | 3 | 10 | – | 3 |
| Nevada | 4 | – | 4 | 7 | – | 6 |
| San Jose State | 2 | – | 6 | 5 | – | 7 |
| UNLV | 2 | – | 6 | 4 | – | 8 |
| Fresno State | 2 | – | 6 | 4 | – | 8 |
Championship: Boise State 31, Hawaii 10
$ – Conference champion; x – Division champion/co-champions; y – Championship game participant; Rankings from AP Poll

The 2019 Air Force Falcons football team represented the United States Air Force Academy as a member of the Mountain Division in the Mountain West Conference (MW) during the 2019 NCAA Division I FBS football season. Led by 13th-year head coach Troy Calhoun, the Falcons compiled an overall record of 11–2 with a mark of 7–1 in conference play, placing second in the MW's Mountain Division. Air Force was invited to the Cheez-It Bowl, where the Falcons defeated Washington State by a score of 31–21. The team played home games at Falcon Stadium in Colorado Springs, Colorado

The Falcons' 11 wins are the most in a single season under head coach Calhoun and the most wins for the program in a single season since the 1998 team finished with a record of 12–1.

== Schedule ==
| Date | Time | Opponent | Site | TV | Result | Attendance |
|---|---|---|---|---|---|---|
| August 31 | 1:30 p.m. | Colgate* | Falcon Stadium; Colorado Springs, CO | ESPN3 | W 48–7 | 33,101 |
| September 14 | 11:00 a.m. | at Colorado* | Folsom Field; Boulder, CO | P12N | W 30–23 ^{OT} | 49,282 |
| September 20 | 7:00 p.m. | at No. 20 Boise State | Albertsons Stadium; Boise, ID | ESPN2 | L 19–30 | 36,498 |
| September 27 | 6:00 p.m. | San Jose State | Falcon Stadium; Colorado Springs, CO | CBSSN | W 41–24 | 24,786 |
| October 5 | 1:30 p.m. | at Navy* | Navy-Marine Corps Memorial Stadium; Annapolis, MD (Commander-in-Chief's Trophy) | CBSSN | L 25–34 | 37,957 |
| October 12 | 5:00 p.m. | Fresno State | Falcon Stadium; Colorado Springs, CO | CBSSN | W 43–24 | 22,544 |
| October 19 | 9:00 p.m. | at Hawaii | Aloha Stadium; Honolulu, HI (Kuter Trophy) | CBSSN | W 56–26 | 23,757 |
| October 26 | 8:15 p.m. | Utah State | Falcon Stadium; Colorado Springs, CO | ESPN2 | W 31–7 | 19,248 |
| November 2 | 1:30 p.m. | Army* | Falcon Stadium; Colorado Springs, CO (Commander-in-Chief's Trophy) | CBSSN | W 17–13 | 41,401 |
| November 16 | 5:00 p.m. | at Colorado State | Canvas Stadium; Fort Collins, CO (Ram−Falcon Trophy) | ESPN2 | W 38–21 | 24,914 |
| November 23 (Note: The game between Air Force and New Mexico, originally scheduled for November 9, was rescheduled to November 23 due to the death of New Mexico player Nahje Flowers.) | 12:00 p.m. | at New Mexico | Dreamstyle Stadium; Albuquerque, NM | ESPN3 | W 44–22 | 13,844 |
| November 30 | 12:00 p.m. | Wyoming | Falcon Stadium; Colorado Springs, CO | Stadium on Facebook | W 20–6 | 21,425 |
| December 27 | 8:15 p.m. | vs. Washington State* | Chase Field; Phoenix, AZ (Cheez-It Bowl) | ESPN | W 31–21 | 34,105 |
*Non-conference game; Rankings from AP Poll and College Football Playoff Rankings after November 5 released prior to game; All times are in Mountain time

== Rankings ==
Ranking movements Legend: ██ Increase in ranking ██ Decrease in ranking — = Not ranked RV = Received votes
| | Week | | | | | | | | | | | | | | | | |
| Poll | Pre | 1 | 2 | 3 | 4 | 5 | 6 | 7 | 8 | 9 | 10 | 11 | 12 | 13 | 14 | 15 | Final |
|---|---|---|---|---|---|---|---|---|---|---|---|---|---|---|---|---|---|
| AP | — | — | — | — | — | — | — | — | — | — | — | RV | RV | RV | 25 | 24 | 22 |
| Coaches | — | — | — | — | — | RV | — | — | — | RV | RV | RV | RV | RV | 25 | 24 | 23 |
| CFP | Not released | | | | | | | | | | — | — | — | — | — | — | Not released |

== Preseason ==
=== Award watch lists ===
Listed in the order that they were released

| Award | Player | Position | Year |
|---|---|---|---|
| Wuerffel Trophy | Isaiah Sanders | QB | SR |
| Polynesian College Football Player of the Year | Mosese Fifita | DL | SR |

=== Mountain West media days ===
The Mountain West media days were held from July 23−24, 2019 at Green Valley Ranch in Henderson, NV.

==== Media poll ====
The preseason poll was released at the Mountain West media days on July 23, 2019. The Falcons were predicted to finish in third place in the MW Mountain Division.

==== Preseason All−Mountain West Team ====
The Falcons had two players selected to the preseason All−Mountain West Team, both from the defensive side of the ball.

Defense

Jordan Jackson – DL

Jeremy Fejedelem – DB

== Game summaries ==
=== Colgate ===
Colgate Raiders at Air Force Falcons

| Quarter | 1 | 2 | 3 | 4 | Total |
|---|---|---|---|---|---|
| Raiders | 0 | 0 | 7 | 0 | 7 |
| Falcons | 7 | 28 | 13 | 0 | 48 |

at Falcon Stadium, Colorado Springs, CO

- Date: August 31, 2019
- Game time: 1:30 p.m. MDT
- Game weather: Temperature: 81 °F (27 °C) • Weather: Cloudy
- Game attendance: 33,101
- Referee: Mike Cuttone
- TV announcers (ESPN3): Trey Bender (play-by-play) & Al Groh (analyst)
- ESPN – Hammond leads way with 3 TDs, Air Force beats Colgate 48–7 /// Box Score, Colgate at Air Force /// Pregame Notes /// Postgame Notes

Game information

First Quarter

- (10:55) AFA TD – Donald Hammond III 2-yard rush, Jake Koehnke kick
  Drive: 6 plays, 33 yards, 2:42; Air Force 7–0

Second Quarter

- (12:11) AFA TD – Donald Hammond III 17-yard rush, Jake Koehnke kick
  Drive: 9 plays, 80 yards, 3:46; Air Force 14–0
- (07:46) AFA TD – Kadin Remsberg 2-yard rush, Jake Koehnke kick
  Drive: 3 plays, 46 yards, 1:00; Air Force 21–0
- (02:08) AFA TD – Kadin Remsberg 6-yard rush, Jake Koehnke kick
  Drive: 8 plays, 60 yards, 4:06; Air Force 28–0
- (01:57) AFA TD – Donald Hammond III 1-yard rush, Jake Koehnke kick
  Drive: 1 play, 1 yard, 0:04; Air Force 35–0

Third Quarter

- (11:23) AFA TD – Timothy Jackson 1-yard rush, Jake Koehnke kick blocked
  Drive: 8 plays, 75 yards, 3:37; Air Force 41–0
- (03:53) AFA TD – Nolan Eriksen 8-yard rush, Tevye Schuettpelz-Rohl kick
  Drive: 9 plays, 74 yards, 5:09; Air Force 48–0
- (00:09) GATE TD – Nick Gill 13-yard pass from Grant Breneman, Chris Puzzi kick
  Drive: 8 plays, 77 yards, 3:37; Air Force 48–7

Fourth Quarter
No scoring

Passing

- GATE – Grant Breneman: 9/16, 81 yards, 1 TD, 1 INT
- AFA – Isaiah Sanders: 1/1, 41 yards

Rushing

- GATE – Malik Twyman: 14 carries, 48 yards
- AFA – Taven Birdow: 9 carries, 80 yards

Receiving

- GATE – Nick Diaco: 2 receptions, 29 yards
- AFA – Geraud Sanders: 1 reception, 41 yards

=== At Colorado ===
Air Force Falcons at Colorado Buffaloes

| Quarter | 1 | 2 | 3 | 4 | OT | Total |
|---|---|---|---|---|---|---|
| Falcons | 6 | 14 | 0 | 3 | 7 | 30 |
| Buffaloes | 10 | 0 | 0 | 13 | 0 | 23 |

at Folsom Field, Boulder, CO

- Date: September 14, 2019
- Game time: 11:00 a.m. MDT
- Game weather: Temperature: 73 °F (23 °C) • Weather: Calm
- Game attendance: 49,282
- Referee: Brad Van Vark
- TV announcers (P12N): Guy Haberman (play-by-play), Chad Brown (analyst) & Camryn Irwin (color)
- ESPN – Remsberg scores in OT, Air Force beats Colorado 30–23 /// Box Score, Air Force at Colorado /// Pregame Notes /// Postgame Notes

Game information

First Quarter

- (09:37) COLO TD – Lavis Shenault 42-yard pass from Steven Montez, James Stefanou kick
  Drive: 11 plays, 75 yards, 5:23; Colorado 7–0
- (07:23) COLO FG – James Stefanou 36-yard field goal
  Drive: 5 plays, 15 yards, 1:17; Colorado 10–0
- (04:03) AFA TD – Geraud Sanders 32-yard pass from Donald Hammond III, Jake Koehnke kick failed
  Drive: 7 plays, 75 yards, 3:20; Colorado 10–6

Second Quarter

- (10:27) AFA TD – Donald Hammond III 2-yard rush, Jake Koehnke kick
  Drive: 12 plays, 78 yards, 6:05; Air Force 13–10
- (06:37) AFA TD – Ben Waters 81-yard pass from Donald Hammond III, Jake Koehnke kick
  Drive: 2 plays, 78 yards, 0:44; Air Force 20–10

Third Quarter
No scoring
Fourth Quarter

- (10:23) AFA FG – Jake Koehnke 47-yard field goal
  Drive: 13 plays, 51 yards, 8:35; Air Force 23–10
- (06:09) COLO TD – Dimitri Stanley 13-yard pass from Steven Montez, James Stefanou kick blocked
  Drive: 12 plays, 75 yards, 4:14; Air Force 23–16
- (00:28) COLO TD – Lavis Shenault 2-yard rush, James Stefanou kick
  Drive: 13 plays, 60 yards, 3:53; Tied 23–23

Overtime

- AFA TD – Kadin Remsberg 25-yard rush, Jake Koehnke kick
  Drive: 1 play, 25 yards, 0:00; Air Force 30–23

Passing

- AFA – Donald Hammond III: 7/12, 155 yards, 2 TD, 1 INT
- COLO – Steven Montez: 26/43, 220 yards, 2 TD, 1 INT

Rushing

- AFA – Kadin Remsberg: 23 carries, 146 yards, 1 TD
- COLO – Jaren Mangham: 10 carries, 56 yards

Receiving

- AFA – Ben Waters: 2 receptions, 92 yards, 1 TD
- COLO – Lavis Shenault: 8 receptions, 124 yards, 1 TD

=== At Boise State ===
Air Force Falcons at No. 20 Boise State Broncos

| Quarter | 1 | 2 | 3 | 4 | Total |
|---|---|---|---|---|---|
| Falcons | 0 | 10 | 3 | 6 | 19 |
| No. 20 Broncos | 0 | 10 | 7 | 13 | 30 |

at Albertsons Stadium, Boise, ID

- Date: September 20, 2019
- Game time: 7:00 p.m. MDT
- Game weather: Temperature: 64 °F (18 °C) • Wind: NW 9 mph • Weather: Partly Cloudy
- Game attendance: 36,498
- Referee: Reggie Smith
- TV announcers (ESPN2): Dave Flemming (play-by-play), Jim Mora (analyst) & Paul Carcaterra (sideline)
- ESPN – Big 2nd half leads No. 20 Boise State past Air Force 30–19 /// Box Score, Air Force at No. 20 Boise State /// Pregame Notes /// Postgame Notes

Game information

First Quarter
No scoring
Second Quarter

- (14:55) AFA TD – Donald Hammond III 8-yard rush, Jake Koehnke kick
  Drive: 6 plays, 46 yards, 3:11; Air Force 7–0
- (12:01) BSU TD – CT Thomas 36-yard pass from Hank Bachmeier, Eric Sachse kick
  Drive: 8 plays, 80 yards, 2:46; Tied 7–7
- (05:53) BSU FG – Eric Sachse 40-yard field goal
  Drive: 9 plays, 60 yards, 3:11; Boise State 10–7
- (00:00) AFA FG – Jake Koehnke 30-yard field goal
  Drive: 14 plays, 52 yards, 5:53; Tied 10–10

Third Quarter

- (06:29) AFA FG – Jake Koehnke 31-yard field goal
  Drive: 8 plays, 43 yards, 4:55; Air Force 13–10
- (00:34) BSU TD – John Bates 28-yard pass from Hank Bachmeier, Eric Sachse kick
  Drive: 11 plays, 77 yards, 5:51; Boise State 17–13

Fourth Quarter

- (08:30) BSU TD – Robert Mahone 10-yard rush, Eric Sachse kick blocked
  Drive: 8 plays, 52 yards, 4:24; Boise State 23–13
- (04:35) BSU TD – Robert Mahone 10-yard rush, Eric Sachse kick
  Drive: 5 plays, 27 yards, 2:42; Boise State 30–13
- (02:27) AFA TD – Geraud Sanders 31-yard pass from Donald Hammond III, Jake Koehnke kick blocked
  Drive: 7 plays, 75 yards, 2:08; Boise State 30–19

Passing

- AFA – Donald Hammond III: 6/11, 83 yards, 1 TD, 1 INT
- BSU – Hank Bachmeier: 19/26, 263 yards, 2 TD

Rushing

- AFA – Taven Birdow: 18 carries, 67 yards
- BSU – Robert Mahone: 13 carries, 73 yards, 2 TD

Receiving

- AFA – Geraud Sanders: 5 receptions, 86 yards, 1 TD
- BSU – CT Thomas: 5 receptions, 119 yards, 1 TD

=== San Jose State ===
San Jose State Spartans at Air Force Falcons

| Quarter | 1 | 2 | 3 | 4 | Total |
|---|---|---|---|---|---|
| Spartans | 7 | 3 | 0 | 14 | 24 |
| Falcons | 7 | 14 | 13 | 7 | 41 |

at Falcon Stadium, Colorado Springs, CO

- Date: September 27, 2019
- Game time: 6:00 p.m. MDT
- Game weather: Temperature: 65 °F (18 °C) • Weather: Cloudy
- Game attendance: 24,786
- Referee: Kevin Hassell
- TV announcers (CBSSN): John Sadak (play-by-play) & Randy Cross (analyst)
- ESPN – Hammond leads Air Force over San Jose State 41–24 /// Box Score, San Jose State at Air Force /// Pregame Notes /// Postgame Notes

Game information

First Quarter

- (10:50) SJSU TD – DeJon Packer 1-yard rush, Matt Mercurio kick
  Drive: 10 plays, 75 yards, 4:10; San Jose State 7–0
- (04:57) AFA TD – Timothy Jackson 7-yard rush, Jake Koehnke kick
  Drive: 13 plays, 75 yards, 5:53; Tied 7–7

Second Quarter

- (08:43) AFA TD – Geraud Sanders 64-yard pass from Donald Hammond III, Jake Koehnke kick
  Drive: 5 plays, 75 yards, 1:45; Air Force 14–7
- (03:13) AFA TD – Taven Birdow 1-yard rush, Jake Koehnke kick
  Drive: 9 plays, 37 yards, 3:59; Air Force 21–7
- (00:48) SJSU FG – Matt Mercurio 25-yard field goal
  Drive: 9 plays, 67 yards, 2:25; Air Force 21–10

Third Quarter

- (12:05) AFA TD – Christian Mallard 3-yard rush, Jake Koehnke kick blocked
  Drive: 8 plays, 75 yards, 2:55; Air Force 27–10
- (10:10) AFA TD – Christian Mallard 7-yard rush, Jake Koehnke kick
  Drive: 6 plays, 20 yards, 1:53; Air Force 34–10

Fourth Quarter

- (07:48) AFA TD – Taven Birdow 3-yard rush, Jake Koehnke kick
  Drive: 16 plays, 88 yards, 9:19; Air Force 41–10
- (03:51) SJSU TD – Andre Crump 30-yard pass from Nick Nash, Matt Mercurio kick
  Drive: 8 plays, 75 yards, 3:57; Air Force 41–17
- (00:52) SJSU TD – Derrick Deese Jr. 6-yard pass from Nick Nash, Matt Mercurio kick
  Drive: 4 plays, 22 yards, 0:43; Air Force 41–24

Passing

- SJSU – Josh Love: 19/35, 198 yards
- AFA – Donald Hammond III: 5/9, 131 yards, 1 TD

Rushing

- SJSU – Nick Nash: 11 carries, 62 yards
- AFA – Taven Birdow: 25 carries, 124 yards, 2 TD

Receiving

- SJSU – Tre Walker: 6 receptions, 69 yards
- AFA – Geraud Sanders: 3 receptions, 108 yards, 1 TD

=== At Navy ===
48th Battle for the Commander-in-Chief's Trophy: Air Force Falcons at Navy Midshipmen

| Quarter | 1 | 2 | 3 | 4 | Total |
|---|---|---|---|---|---|
| Falcons | 3 | 3 | 3 | 16 | 25 |
| Midshipmen | 0 | 14 | 7 | 13 | 34 |

at Navy-Marine Corps Memorial Stadium, Annapolis, MD

- Date: October 5, 2019
- Game time: 3:30 p.m. EDT
- Game weather: Temperature: 64 °F (18 °C) • Wind: E 5-10 mph • Weather: Partly Cloudy
- Game attendance: 37,957
- Referee: Michael VanderVelde
- TV announcers (CBSSN): John Sadak (play-by-play), Randy Cross (analyst) & Sheehan Stanwick-Burch (sideline)
- ESPN – Navy stuns Air Force 34–25 /// Box Score, Air Force at Navy /// Pregame Notes /// Postgame Notes

Game information

F;First Quarter

- (03:09) AF FG – Jake Koehnke 42-yard field goal
  Drive: 4 plays, 8 yards, 2:14; Air Force 3–0

Second Quarter

- (13:24) NAVY TD – Nelson Smith 1-yard rush, Bijan Nichols kick
  Drive: 5 plays, 64 yards, 1:44; Navy 7–3
- (07:39) NAVY TD – Nelson Smith 3-yard rush, Bijan Nichols kick
  Drive: 8 plays, 66 yards, 3:52; Navy 14–3
- (02:17) AF FG – Jake Koehnke 40-yard field goal
  Drive: 13 plays, 53 yards, 5:22; Navy 14–6

Third Quarter

- (12:34) AF FG – Jake Koehnke 49-yard field goal
  Drive: 6 plays, 39 yards, 2:26; Navy 14–9
- (06:36) NAVY TD – Malcolm Perry 20-yard rush, Bijan Nichols kick
  Drive: 5 plays, 44 yards, 2:17; Navy 21–9

Fourth Quarter

- (13:26) AF FG – Jake Koehnke 26-yard field goal
  Drive: 8 plays, 68 yards, 3:16; Navy 21–12
- (07:38) AF TD – Donald Hammond III 1-yard rush, Jake Koehnke kick
  Drive: 8 plays, 37 yards, 3:48; Navy 21–19
- (03:15) AF TD – Taven Birdow 1-yard rush, Donald Hammond III pass failed
  Drive: 6 plays, 72 yards, 2:42; Air Force 25–21
- (00:23) NAVY TD – Malcolm Perry 3-yard rush, Bijan Nichols kick
  Drive: 11 plays, 75 yards, 2:52; Navy 28–25
- (00:00) NAVY TD – Tony Brown 8-yard fumble return
  Drive: 0 plays, 0 yards, 0:00; Navy 34–25

Passing

- AF – Donald Hammond III: 10/25, 205 yards, 1 INT
- NAVY – Malcolm Perry: 5/7, 144 yards

Rushing

- AF – Donald Hammond III: 12 carries, 77 yards, 1 TD
- NAVY – Malcolm Perry: 23 carries, 111 yards, 2 TD

Receiving

- AF – Benjamin Walters: 4 receptions, 128 yards
- NAVY – Mychal Cooper: 3 receptions, 90 yards

=== Fresno State ===
Fresno State Bulldogs at Air Force Falcons

| Quarter | 1 | 2 | 3 | 4 | Total |
|---|---|---|---|---|---|
| Bulldogs | 14 | 10 | 0 | 0 | 24 |
| Falcons | 7 | 15 | 7 | 14 | 43 |

at Falcon Stadium, Colorado Springs, CO

- Date: October 12, 2019
- Game time: 5:00 p.m. MDT
- Game attendance: 22,544
- Referee: Brandon Cruse
- TV announcers (CBSSN): Rich Waltz (play-by-play), Aaron Murray (analyst) & Ashley Holder (sideline)
- ESPN – Hammond's 2 TD runs help Air Force beat Fresno State 43–24 /// Box Score, Fresno State at Air Force /// Pregame Notes /// Postgame Notes

Game information

First Quarter

- (11:24) FS TD – Derrion Grim 4-yard pass from Jorge Reyna, Cesar Silva kick
  Drive: 7 plays, 85 yards, 3:36; Fresno State 7–0
- (10:07) AF TD – Benjamin Waters 53-yard pass from Donald Hammond III, Jake Koehnke kick
  Drive: 3 plays, 75 yards, 1:17; Tied 7–7
- (03:51) FS TD – Emoryie Edwards 7-yard pass from Jorge Reyna, Cesar Silva kick
  Drive: 12 plays, 75 yards, 6:16; Fresno State 14–7

Second Quarter

- (11:48) AF TD – Timothy Jackson 2-yard rush, Jake Koehnke kick
  Drive: 14 plays, 75 yards, 7:03; Tied 14–14
- (09:32) FS TD – Ronnie Rivers 26-yard rush, Cesar Silva kick
  Drive: 6 plays, 73 yards, 2:12; Fresno State 21–14
- (02:55) AF TD – Donald Hammond III 3-yard rush, Donald Hammond III rush
  Drive: 12 plays, 75 yards, 6:37; Air Force 22–21
- (00:07) FS FG – Cesar Silva 47-yard field goal
  Drive: 5 plays, 10 yards, 2:48; Fresno State 24–22

Third Quarter

- (08:18) AF TD – Taven Birdow 3-yard rush, Jake Koehnke kick
  Drive: 8 plays, 40 yards, 3:38; Air Force 29–24

Fourth Quarter

- (13:16) AF TD – Donald Hammond III 3-yard rush, Jake Koehnke kick
  Drive: 13 plays, 79 yards, 7:33; Air Force 36–24
- (12:22) AF TD – Kyle Johnson 24-yard interception return, Jake Koehnke kick
  Drive: 0 plays, 0 yards, 0:00; Air Force 43–24

Passing

- FS – Jorge Reyna: 20/27, 209 yards, 2 TD, 1 INT
- AF – Donald Hammond III: 2/3, 81 yards, 1 TD

Rushing

- FS – Ronnie Rivers: 9 carries, 45 yards, 1 TD
- AF – Timothy Jackson: 20 carries, 117 yards, 1 TD

Receiving

- FS – Emoryie Edwards: 4 receptions, 73 yards, 1 TD
- AF – Benjamin Waters: 1 reception, 53 yards, 1 TD

=== At Hawaii ===
Air Force Falcons at Hawaii Rainbow Warriors

| Quarter | 1 | 2 | 3 | 4 | Total |
|---|---|---|---|---|---|
| Falcons | 7 | 21 | 7 | 21 | 56 |
| Rainbow Warriors | 3 | 17 | 0 | 6 | 26 |

at Aloha Stadium, Honolulu, HI

- Date: October 19, 2019
- Game time: 5:00 p.m. HST
- Game weather: Temperature: 80 °F (27 °C) • Wind: ENE 10 mph • Weather: Partly Cloudy
- Game attendance: 23,757
- Referee: Steve Baron
- TV announcers (CBSSN): Rich Waltz (play-by-play) & Aaron Murray (analyst)
- ESPN – Schmidt accounts for 4 TDs, Air Force beats Hawaii 56–21 /// Box Score, Air Force at Hawaii /// Pregame Notes /// Postgame Notes

Game information

First Quarter

- (09:46) HAW FG – Ryan Meskell 41-yard field goal
  Drive: 10 plays, 52 yards, 5:14; Hawaii 3–0
- (06:09) AF TD – Kadin Remsberg 2-yard rush, Jake Koehnke kick
  Drive: 8 plays, 75 yards, 3:37; Air Force 7–3

Second Quarter

- (14:35) AF TD – Mike Schmidt 1-yard rush, Jake Koehnke kick
  Drive: 10 plays, 75 yards, 5:08; Air Force 14–3
- (13:44) HAW TD – Melquise Stovall 59-yard pass from Cole McDonald, Ryan Meskell kick
  Drive: 3 plays, 73 yards, 0:46; Air Force 14–10
- (13:33) AF TD – Geraud Sanders 75-yard pass from Mike Schmidt, Jake Koehnke kick
  Drive: 1 play, 75 yards, 0:11; Air Force 21–10
- (06:19) HAW FG – Ryan Meskell 27-yard field goal
  Drive: 15 plays, 67 yards, 7:14; Air Force 21–13
- (03:34) AF TD – Kadin Remsberg 7-yard rush, Jake Koehnke kick
  Drive: 5 plays, 86 yards, 2:43; Air Force 28–13
- (02:04) HAW TD – Melquise Stovall 5-yard pass from Cole McDonald, Ryan Meskell kick
  Drive: 4 plays, 71 yards, 1:30; Air Force 28–20

Third Quarter

- (07:19) AF TD – Timothy Jackson 10-yard rush, Jake Koehnke kick
  Drive: 14 plays, 75 yards, 7:41; Air Force 35–20

Fourth Quarter

- (14:54) HAW TD – JoJo Ward 10-yard pass from Cole McDonald, Cole McDonald pass failed
  Drive: 10 plays, 58 yards, 2:27; Air Force 35–26
- (13:37) AF TD – Mike Schmidt 61-yard rush, Jake Koehnke kick
  Drive: 3 plays, 75 yards, 1:17; Air Force 42–26
- (07:49) AF TD – Mike Schmidt 18-yard rush, Jake Koehnke kick
  Drive: 7 plays, 42 yards, 3:32; Air Force 49–26
- (04:01) AF TD – Milton Bugg III 92-yard interception return, Jake Koehnke kick
  Drive: 0 plays, 0 yards, 0:00; Air Force 56–26

Passing

- AF – Mike Schmidt: 5/6, 147 yards, 1 TD
- HAW – Cole McDonald: 34/52, 404 yards, 3 TD, 1 INT

Rushing

- AF – Mike Schmidt: 14 carries, 120 yards, 3 TD
- HAW – Cole McDonald: 10 carries, 41 yards

Receiving

- AF – Geraud Sanders: 3 receptions, 116 yards, 1 TD
- HAW – Jared Smart: 11 receptions, 140 yards

=== Utah State ===
Utah State Aggies at Air Force Falcons

| Quarter | 1 | 2 | 3 | 4 | Total |
|---|---|---|---|---|---|
| Aggies | 0 | 0 | 7 | 0 | 7 |
| Falcons | 0 | 17 | 7 | 7 | 31 |

at Falcon Stadium, Colorado Springs, CO

- Date: October 26, 2019
- Game time: 8:15 p.m. MDT
- Game weather: Temperature: 52 °F (11 °C) • Wind: Windy • Weather: Clear
- Game attendance: 19,248
- Referee: Scott Campbell
- TV announcers (ESPN2): Mike Couzens (play-by-play), Kirk Morrison (analyst) & Taylor McGregor (sideline)
- ESPN – Jackson, Remsberg power Air Force past Utah State 31–7 /// Box Score, Utah State at Air Force /// Pregame Notes /// Postgame Notes

Game information

First Quarter
No scoring
Second Quarter

- (11:55) AF TD – Timothy Jackson 1-yard rush, Jake Koehnke kick
  Drive: 10 plays, 85 yards, 5:03; Air Force 7–0
- (06:36) AF TD – Kadin Remsberg 1-yard rush, Jake Koehnke kick
  Drive: 8 plays, 57 yards, 4:00; Air Force 14–0
- (00:00) AF FG – Jake Koehnke 57-yard field goal
  Drive: 12 plays, 50 yards, 5:01; Air Force 17–0

Third Quarter

- (11:49) USU TD – Siaosi Mariner 27-yard pass from Jordan Love, Dominik Eberle kick
  Drive: 9 plays, 75 yards, 3:11; Air Force 17–7
- (03:17) AF TD – Kadin Remsberg 9-yard rush, Jake Koehnke kick
  Drive: 8 plays, 41 yards, 3:53; Air Force 24–7

Fourth Quarter

- (10:06) AF TD – Taven Birdow 1-yard rush, Jake Koehnke kick
  Drive: 11 plays, 66 yards, 6:21; Air Force 31–7

Passing

- USU – Jordan Love: 14/23, 114 yards, 1 TD
- AF – Donald Hammond III: 1/5, 16 yards

Rushing

- USU – Gerold Bright: 6 carries, 24 yards
- AF – Timothy Jackson: 25 carries, 148 yards, 1 TD

Receiving

- USU – Siaosi Mariner: 3 receptions, 38 yards, 1 TD
- AF – Benjamin Waters: 2 receptions, 24 yards

=== Army ===
48th Battle for the Commander-in-Chief's Trophy: Army Black Knights at Air Force Falcons

| Quarter | 1 | 2 | 3 | 4 | Total |
|---|---|---|---|---|---|
| Black Knights | 0 | 6 | 7 | 0 | 13 |
| Falcons | 0 | 3 | 7 | 7 | 17 |

at Falcon Stadium, Colorado Springs, CO

- Date: November 2, 2019
- Game time: 1:30 p.m. MDT
- Game weather: Temperature: 51 °F (11 °C) • Wind: SSE 5 mph • Weather: Fair
- Game attendance: 41,401
- Referee: Stuart Mullins
- TV announcers (CBSSN): Ben Holden (play-by-play), Ross Tucker (analyst) & John Schriffen (sideline)
- ESPN – Air Force makes late defensive stand in 17–13 win over Army /// Box Score, Army at Air Force /// Pregame Notes /// Postgame Notes

Game information

First Quarter
No scoring
Second Quarter

- (08:08) AF FG – Jake Koehnke 20-yard field goal
  Drive: 9 plays, 77 yards, 4:53; Air Force 3–0
- (01:17) ARMY TD – Jabari Laws 2-yard rush, Cole Talley kick failed
  Drive: 11 plays, 65 yards, 6:51; Army 6–3

Third Quarter

- (02:35) AF TD – Timothy Jackson 3-yard rush, Jake Koehnke kick
  Drive: 9 plays, 64 yards, 4:20; Air Force 10–6
- (02:22) ARMY TD – Cam Harrison 87-yard pass from Jabari Laws, Cole Talley kick
  Drive: 1 play, 87 yards, 0:13; Army 13–10

Fourth Quarter

- (13:08) AF TD – Joshua Stoner 5-yard rush, Jake Koehnke kick
  Drive: 9 plays, 74 yards, 4:08; Air Force 17–13

Passing

- ARMY – Jabari Laws: 9/11, 214 yards, 1 TD
- AF – Donald Hammond III: 1/6, 19 yards, 1 INT

Rushing

- ARMY – Sandon McCoy: 8 carries, 67 yards
- AF – Timothy Jackson: 20 carries, 155 yards, 1 TD

Receiving

- ARMY – Cam Harrison: 3 receptions, 103 yards, 1 TD
- AF – Geraud Sanders: 1 reception, 19 yards

=== At Colorado State ===
Battle for the Ram–Falcon Trophy: Air Force Falcons at Colorado State Rams

| Quarter | 1 | 2 | 3 | 4 | Total |
|---|---|---|---|---|---|
| Falcons | 0 | 10 | 0 | 28 | 38 |
| Rams | 14 | 0 | 0 | 7 | 21 |

at Canvas Stadium, Fort Collins, CO

- Date: November 16, 2019
- Game time: 5:00 p.m. MST
- Game weather: Temperature: 42 °F (6 °C) • Wind: 23 mph • Weather: Cloudy and Windy
- Game attendance: 24,914
- Referee: David Alvarez
- TV announcers (ESPN2): Roy Philpott (play-by-play), Kelly Stouffer (analyst) & Lauren Sisler (sideline)
- ESPN – Hammond leads Air Force over Colorado State 38–21 /// Box Score, Air Force at Colorado State /// Pregame Notes /// Postgame Notes

Game information

First Quarter

- (09:03) CSU TD – Trey McBride 4-yard pass from Patrick O'Brien, Maxwell Poduska kick
  Drive: 14 plays, 75 yards, 5:57; Colorado State 7–0
- (03:32) CSU TD – Mohamed Kamara 63-yard fumble return, Maxwell Poduska kick
  Drive: 0 plays, 0 yards, 0:00; Colorado State 14–0

Second Quarter

- (06:42) AF TD – Benjamin Waters 31-yard pass from Donald Hammond III, Jake Koehnke kick
  Drive: 5 plays, 65 yards, 2:18; Colorado State 14–7
- (01:05) AF FG – Jake Koehnke 31-yard field goal
  Drive: 7 plays, 21 yards, 2:43; Colorado State 14–10

Third Quarter
No scoring
Fourth Quarter

- (13:44) AF TD – Geraud Sanders 50-yard pass from Donald Hammond III, Jake Koehnke kick
  Drive: 7 plays, 75 yards, 2:36; Air Force 17–14
- (07:21) AF TD – Benjamin Waters 28-yard pass from Donald Hammond III, Jake Koehnke kick
  Drive: 8 plays, 58 yards, 4:41; Air Force 24–14
- (06:36) CSU TD – Dante Wright 17-yard pass from Patrick O'Brien, Maxwell Poduska kick
  Drive: 2 plays, 75 yards, 0:45; Air Force 24–21
- (02:32) AF TD – Donald Hammond III 1-yard rush, Jake Koehnke kick
  Drive: 8 plays, 75 yards, 4:04; Air Force 31–21
- (01:22) AF TD – Zane Lewis 99-yard interception return, Jake Koehnke kick
  Drive: 0 plays, 0 yards, 0:00; Air Force 38–21

Passing

- AF – Donald Hammond III: 5/11, 126 yards, 3 TD, 1 INT
- CSU – Patrick O'Brien: 28/43, 347 yards, 2 TD, 1 INT

Rushing

- AF – Kadin Remsberg: 17 carries, 101 yards
- CSU – Marcus McElroy: 11 carries, 51 yards

Receiving

- AF – Benjamin Waters: 2 receptions, 59 yards, 2 TD
- CSU – Warren Jackson: 8 receptions, 88 yards

=== At New Mexico ===
Air Force Falcons at New Mexico Lobos

| Quarter | 1 | 2 | 3 | 4 | Total |
|---|---|---|---|---|---|
| Falcons | 7 | 7 | 16 | 14 | 44 |
| Lobos | 7 | 3 | 6 | 6 | 22 |

at Dreamstyle Stadium, Albuquerque, NM

- Date: November 23, 2019
- Game time: 12:00 p.m. MST
- Game weather: Temperature: 51 °F (11 °C) • Wind: None • Weather: Sunny
- Game attendance: 13,844
- Referee: Kevin Hassell
- TV announcers (ESPN3): Trey Bender (play-by-play) & Tyoka Jackson (analyst)
- ESPN – Hammond's career day lifts Air Force past New Mexico 44–22 /// Box Score, Air Force at New Mexico /// Pregame Notes /// Postgame Notes

Game information

First Quarter

- (08:42) NM TD – Bobby Cole 3-yard rush, Andrew Shelley kick
  Drive: 12 plays, 65 yards, 6:18; New Mexico 7–0
- (03:43) AF TD – Donald Hammond III 1-yard rush, Jake Koehnke kick
  Drive: 10 plays, 75 yards, 4:59; Tied 7–7

Second Quarter

- (13:53) AF TD – Taven Birdow 4-yard rush, Jake Koehnke kick
  Drive: 7 plays, 72 yards, 3:11; Air Force 14–7
- (00:24) NM FG – Andrew Shelley 40-yard field goal
  Drive: 10 plays, 72 yards, 4:24; Air Force 14–10

Third Quarter

- (11:05) AF TD – Geraud Sanders 46-yard pass from Donald Hammond III, Jake Koehnke kick
  Drive: 8 plays, 75 yards, 3:55; Air Force 21–10
- (05:24) NM TD – Jordan Kress 13-yard pass from Trae Hall, Andrew Shelley kick blocked
  Drive: 10 plays, 74 yards, 5:35; Air Force 21–16
- (05:24) AF D2P – Milton Bugg III 98-yard blocked PAT return
  Drive: 0 plays, 0 yards, 0:00; Air Force 23–16
- (02:26) AF TD – Benjamin Waters 59-yard pass from Donald Hammond III, Jake Koehnke kick
  Drive: 5 plays, 75 yards, 2:58; Air Force 30–16

Fourth Quarter

- (13:08) AF TD – Geraud Sanders 27-yard pass from Donald Hammond III, Jake Koehnke kick
  Drive: 5 plays, 45 yards, 2:04; Air Force 37–16
- (07:50) AF TD – Benjamin Waters 76-yard pass from Donald Hammond III, Jake Koehnke kick
  Drive: 5 plays, 92 yards, 2:37; Air Force 44–16
- (01:57) NM TD – Aaron Molina 27-yard pass from Trae Hall, Trae Hall pass failed
  Drive: 10 plays, 77 yards, 5:46; Air Force 44–22

Passing

- AF – Donald Hammond III: 9/10, 327 yards, 4 TD
- NM – Trae Hall: 5/7, 55 yards, 2 TD

Rushing

- AF – Taven Birdow: 17 carries, 110 yards, 1 TD
- NM – Tevaka Tuioti: 8 carries, 79 yards

Receiving

- AF – Benjamin Waters: 4 receptions, 171 yards, 2 TD
- NM – Cedric Patterson III: 2 receptions, 29 yards

=== Wyoming ===
Wyoming Cowboys at Air Force Falcons

| Quarter | 1 | 2 | 3 | 4 | Total |
|---|---|---|---|---|---|
| Cowboys | 0 | 0 | 0 | 6 | 6 |
| Falcons | 0 | 7 | 3 | 10 | 20 |

at Falcon Stadium, Colorado Springs, CO

- Date: November 30, 2019
- Game time: 12:00 p.m. MST
- Game weather: Temperature: 35 °F (2 °C) • Wind: NW 22 mph • Weather: Partly Cloudy
- Game attendance: 21,425
- Referee: Eddy Shelton
- TV announcers (Stadium on Facebook): Noah Coslov (play-by-play), Max Starks (analyst) & Kristen Balboni (sideline)
- ESPN – Air Force downs Wyoming 20–6 behind Hammond /// Box Score, Wyoming at Air Force /// Pregame Notes /// Postgame Notes

Game information

First Quarter
No scoring
Second Quarter

- (14:56) AF TD – Donald Hammond III 1-yard rush, Jake Koehnke kick
  Drive: 16 plays, 73 yards, 8:42; Air Force 7–0

Third Quarter

- (05:50) AF FG – Jake Koehnke 31-yard field goal
  Drive: 13 plays, 41 yards, 7:10; Air Force 10–0

Fourth Quarter

- (13:08) WYO FG – Cooper Rothe 26-yard field goal
  Drive: 16 plays, 66 yards, 7:42; Air Force 10–3
- (05:31) AF FG – Jake Koehnke 27-yard field goal
  Drive: 9 plays, 51 yards, 4:10; Air Force 13–3
- (02:23) WYO FG – Cooper Rothe 23-yard field goal
  Drive: 5 plays, 35 yards, 2:58; Air Force 13–6
- (02:04) AF TD – Benjamin Waters 75-yard pass from Donald Hammond III, Jake Koehnke kick
  Drive: 2 plays, 75 yards, 0:19; Air Force 20–6

Passing

- WYO – Levi Williams: 6/11, 84 yards, 1 INT
- AF – Donald Hammond III: 5/6, 121 yards, 1 TD

Rushing

- WYO – Levi Williams: 15 carries, 79 yards
- AF – Kadin Remsberg: 14 carries, 63 yards

Receiving

- WYO – Raghib Ismail Jr.: 3 receptions, 41 yards
- AF – Benjamin Waters: 3 receptions, 100 yards, 1 TD

=== Vs. Washington State – Cheez-It Bowl ===
Cheez-It Bowl: Air Force Falcons vs. Washington State Cougars

| Quarter | 1 | 2 | 3 | 4 | Total |
|---|---|---|---|---|---|
| Falcons | 0 | 17 | 7 | 7 | 31 |
| Cougars | 0 | 14 | 0 | 7 | 21 |

at Chase Field, Phoenix, AZ

- Date: December 27, 2019
- Game time: 8:15 p.m. MST
- Game weather: Temperature: 48 °F (9 °C) • Wind: WSW 7 mph • Weather: Cloudy
- Game attendance: 34,105
- Referee: Jeff Servinski
- TV announcers (ESPN): Clay Matvick (play-by-play), Ryan Leaf (analyst) & Cole Cubelic (sideline)
- ESPN – Air Force tops Washington State 31–21 at Cheez-It Bowl /// Box Score, Air Force vs. Washington State, 2019 Cheez-It Bowl /// Pregame Notes /// Postgame Notes

Game information

First Quarter
No scoring
Second Quarter

- (14:52) AF TD – Donald Hammond III 1-yard rush, Jake Koehnke kick
  Drive: 20 plays, 98 yards, 12:23; Air Force 7–0
- (10:43) WSU TD – Dezmon Patmon 2-yard pass from Anthony Gordon, Blake Mazza kick
  Drive: 11 plays, 74 yards, 4:09; Tied 7–7
- (03:39) AF FG – Jake Koehnke 28-yard field goal
  Drive: 15 plays, 65 yards, 7:04; Air Force 10–7
- (01:19) AF TD – Taven Birdow 3-yard rush, Jake Koehnke kick
  Drive: 4 plays, 23 yards, 2:08; Air Force 17–7
- (00:24) WSU TD – Max Borghi 5-yard pass from Anthony Gordon, Blake Mazza kick
  Drive: 5 plays, 75 yards, 0:55; Air Force 17–14

Third Quarter

- (08:19) AF TD – Donald Hammond III 7-yard rush, Jake Koehnke kick
  Drive: 13 plays, 75 yards, 6:41; Air Force 24–14

Fourth Quarter

- (09:59) WSU TD – Brandon Arconado 13-yard pass from Anthony Gordon, Blake Mazza kick
  Drive: 4 plays, 31 yards, 1:16; Air Force 24–21
- (03:50) AF TD – Kadin Remsberg 3-yard rush, Jake Koehnke kick
  Drive: 10 plays, 60 yards, 6:09; Air Force 31–21

Passing

- AF – Donald Hammond III: 4/12, 30 yards, 1 INT
- WSU – Anthony Gordon: 28/42, 351 yards, 3 TD

Rushing

- AF – Kadin Remsberg: 26 carries, 178 yards, 1 TD
- WSU – Max Borghi: 6 carries, 27 yards

Receiving

- AF – Benjamin Waters: 2 receptions, 12 yards
- WSU – Brandon Arconado: 11 receptions, 167 yards, 1 TD

== Personnel ==
=== Coaching staff ===
| Name | Position | First year position | First year Air Force | Alma Mater |
|---|---|---|---|---|
| Troy Calhoun | Head coach | 2007 | 2007^{1} | Air Force (1989) |
Offensive staff
| Mike Thiessen | Offensive coordinator / quarterbacks | 2014 / 2015 | 2004 | Air Force (2001) |
| Jake Campbell | Offensive backs | 2012 | 2012^{2} | Air Force (1996) |
| Ari Confesor | Wide weceivers | 2019 | 2019 | Holy Cross (2004) |
| Jordan Eason | Asst. offensive line | 2018 | 2016 | Air Force (2013) |
| Steed Lobotzke | Offensive line | 2016 | 2015^{3} | Air Force (1992) |
| Ben Miller | Running backs / special teams coordinator | 2012 / 2010 | 2007^{4} | Air Force (2002) |
| Jonathan Wallace | Tight ends | 2019 | 2019 | Auburn (2015) |
Defensive staff
| John Rudzinski | Defensive coordinator / secondary | 2018 / 2015 | 2010^{5} | Air Force (2005) |
| Terrance Jamison | Defensive line | 2019 | 2019 | Wisconsin (2009) |
| Brian Knorr | Outside linebackers | 2019 | 2018^{6} | Air Force (1986) |
| Alex Means | Asst. defensive line | 2018 | 2017^{7} | Air Force (2013) |
| Capt. Andre Morris | Defensive asst. | 2019 | 2017^{8} | Air Force (2011) |
| Ron Vanderlinden | Inside linebackers | 2014 | 2014 | Albion (1978) |
| Chip Vaughn | Secondary | 2018 | 2018 | Wake Forest (2009) |
Strength and conditioning staff
| Matt McGettigan | Head football strength & conditioning | 2007 | 2007 | Luther (Iowa) (1987) |
Support staff
| Steve Senn | Director of recruiting | 2017 | 2007^{9} | Air Force (1990) |
| Col. Meg Martin | NCAA faculty representative | | | |
| Maj. Leotis Palmer | Administrative assistant | | | |
| Kyra Shea | Office manager | | | |
| Chris Miller | Video operations | | | |
| Mitch Browning | Recruiting support | | | |
| Jess Souza | Associate A.D., events | | | |
| Dan Siermine | Associate A.D., equipment | | | |
| Darren Hain | Equipment manager | | | |
| Casey Green | Stadium manager | | | |
| Jeff Cosky | Football operations | | | |
| Jerry McGinty | Human performance | | | |
| Ernie Sadelmyer | Athletic training | | | |
| Erik Kozlowski | Athletic training | | | |
| Mark Peters | Athletic training | | | |
| Derek Fitts | Athletic training | | | |
| Jessica Achatz | Athletic training | | | |
| Jack Braley | Athletic training | | | |

1. Troy Calhoun also served as a graduate assistant in 1989 and assistant coach for the varsity and junior varsity teams from 1993 to 1994 at Air Force.
2. Jake Campbell also served as a graduate assistant at the Air Force Prep School in 1996.
3. Steed Lobotzke also served as a graduate assistant at Air Force in 1993.
4. Ben Miller also served as a graduate assistant at Air Force from 2002 to 2003.
5. John Rudzinski also served as a graduate assistant at Air Force from 2005 to 2007.
6. Brian Knorr also served as an assistant coach for the varsity and junior varsity teams from 1992 to 1994 and as a linebackers/safeties/assistant head coach from 2005 to 2007 at Air Force.
7. Alex Means also served as a graduate assistant at Air Force in 2014.
8. Capt. Andre Morris also served as a graduate assistant at Air Force in 2011.
9. Steve Senn also served as a graduate assistant at Air Force in 1991.

=== Roster ===
The Air Force football roster prior to 2019 fall camp (as of July 17, 2019):

(please note that the Air Force football team rarely lists freshman players on their official roster)

2019 Air Force Falcons roster
| Quarterback: 4 Isaiah Sanders, Senior (6'2, 210); 5 Donald Hammond III, Junior (6'2, 220); 12 Warren Bryan, Sophomore (6'1, 205); 16 Mike Schmidt, Senior (6'3, 205); Running back: 19 Nolan Eriksen, Senior (5'9, 195); 22 Joshua Stoner, Junior (5'8, 195); 23 Jakeem Patrick, Sophomore (6'0, 230); 24 Kadin Remsberg, Junior (5'9, 185); 25 Christian Mallard, Senior (5'9, 215); 27 Ben Peterson, Junior (5'8, 175); Fullback: 32 Matthew Murla, Junior (6'0, 225); 33 Taven Birdow, Senior (6'1, 220); 34 Timothy Jackson, Sophomore (6'3, 190); 43 Colton Parton, Senior (5'11, 225); 44 Omar Fattah, Sophomore (5'11, 225); Wide receiver: 7 Geraud Sanders, Senior (6'2, 210); 9 David Cormier, Sophomore (6'3, 225); 10 Brandon Lewis, Sophomore (5'9, 165); 13 Luke Bohenek, Junior (6'3, 205); 14 Logan Mann, Sophomore (6'0, 175); 29 Amari Terry, Sophomore (5'7, 180); 80 Daniel Morris, Junior (6'2, 200); 83 Jake Spiewak, Sophomore (6'4, 200); Tight end: 81 Lesley Dalger, Senior (6'4, 235); 82 Rhett Harms, Junior (6'3, 225); 85 Luke Miller, Junior (6'4, 225); 87 Kade Waguespack, Senior (6'2, 225) | Offensive Lineman: 53 Joe Moore, Sophomore (6'1, 240); 56 Britton Beasley, Junior (6'1, 300); 57 Elijah Woolum, Senior (6'4, 275); 61 Scott Hattok, Senior (6'5, 280); 62 Hawk Wimmer, Sophomore (6'4, 320); 63 Clark Daniel, Junior (6'3, 290); 64 Kyle Krepsz, Junior (6'1, 280); 64 Jacob Miller, Sophomore (6'3, 265); 66 Nolan Laufenberg, Junior (6'3, 295); 67 Kris Campbell, Sophomore (6'1, 300); 68 Christopher Mitchell, Senior (6'2, 265); 69 Wolfgang Rehbock, Senior (6'3, 285); 70 Nicholas Noyen, Junior (6'0, 265); 71 Benjamin Mercer, Sophomore (6'0, 270); 72 Connor Vikupitz, Senior (6'3, 275); 73 Isaac Cochran, Sophomore (6'5, 300); 74 Rhett Myers, Senior (6'4, 255); 75 Colin Marquez, Senior (6'3, 280); 76 Adam Jewell, Junior (6'2, 255); 77 Parker Ferguson, Junior (6'5, 280); Defensive Lineman: 49 Christopher Herrera, Sophomore (6'5, 255); 86 Michael Purcell, Junior (6'4, 235); 91 Jared Bair, Senior (6'3, 260); 92 Nokoa Pauole, Sophomore (6'2, 275); 94 Jordan Jackson, Junior (6'5, 270); 95 Kolby Barker, Junior (6'4, 240); 96 Joey Woodring, Junior (5'11, 275); 97 Kaleb Nunez, Junior (6'1, 270); 98 Kyler Ehm, Senior (6'3, 285); 99 Mosese Fifita, Senior (6'1, 330); Specialist: 15 Charlie Scott, Senior (6'1, 195); 92 Jake Koehnke, Senior (6'0, 180); 93 Tevye Schuettpelz−Rohl, Sophomore (5'10, 185) | Linebacker: 8 Lakota Wills, Junior (6'3, 235); 26 Vince Sanford, Sophomore (6'1, 200); 30 Grant Donaldson, Junior (6'3, 225); 32 Grant Young, Sophomore (6'0, 225); 35 Christopher Musselman, Senior (6'2, 220); 37 Thadius Blackmon, Sophomore (6'1, 230); 38 Demonte Meeks, Junior (6'1, 235); 40 Kyle Johnson, Senior (6'0, 220); 41 Price Morgan, Senior (6'3, 220); 44 Parker Noren, Junior (6'2, 210); 45 Brandon Gooding, Sophomore (6'5, 220); 47 Nathan King, Senior (6'1, 220); 48 Jake Ksiazek, Senior (6'2, 230); Defensive back: 2 Jeremy Fejedelem, Senior (5'10, 185); 3 Milton Bugg III, Junior (6'0, 175); 4 James Jones IV, Senior (6'2, 195); 6 Zane Lewis, Senior (6'1, 190); 9 Valentino Espinoza, Junior (6'0, 195); 11 Damani Hansford, Junior (5'9, 180); 12 DeAndre Hughes, Sophomore (5'8, 162); 14 Grant Theil, Senior (6'1, 195); 17 Colby Raphiel, Junior (6'0, 200); 20 Benjamin Waters, Senior (6'1, 205); 22 Garrett Kauppila, Senior (6'3, 215); 23 Rodney Hidgon, Sophomore (5'10, 170); 28 David Eure, Sophomore (5'11, 191); 29 Elijah Palm, Junior (5'9, 195); 31 Elisha Palm, Junior (5'8, 185); 39 Matthew Anderson, Junior (6'2, 195); Long snapper: 46 Conner Kirkegaard, Junior (6'0, 205) |
