= 2019 Washington State Cougars football team =

American college football season

2019 Washington State Cougars football

Cheez-It Bowl, L 21–31 vs. Air Force
- Conference: Pac–12 Conference
- North Division
- Record: 6–7 (3–6 Pac-12)
- Head coach: Mike Leach (8th season)
- Offensive scheme: Air raid
- Defensive coordinator: Tracy Claeys (2nd season; first 5 games)
- Co-defensive coordinators: Darcel McBath (interim; games 6–13); Roc Bellantoni (interim; games 6–13)
- Base defense: 4–2–5
- Home stadium: Martin Stadium

Uniform
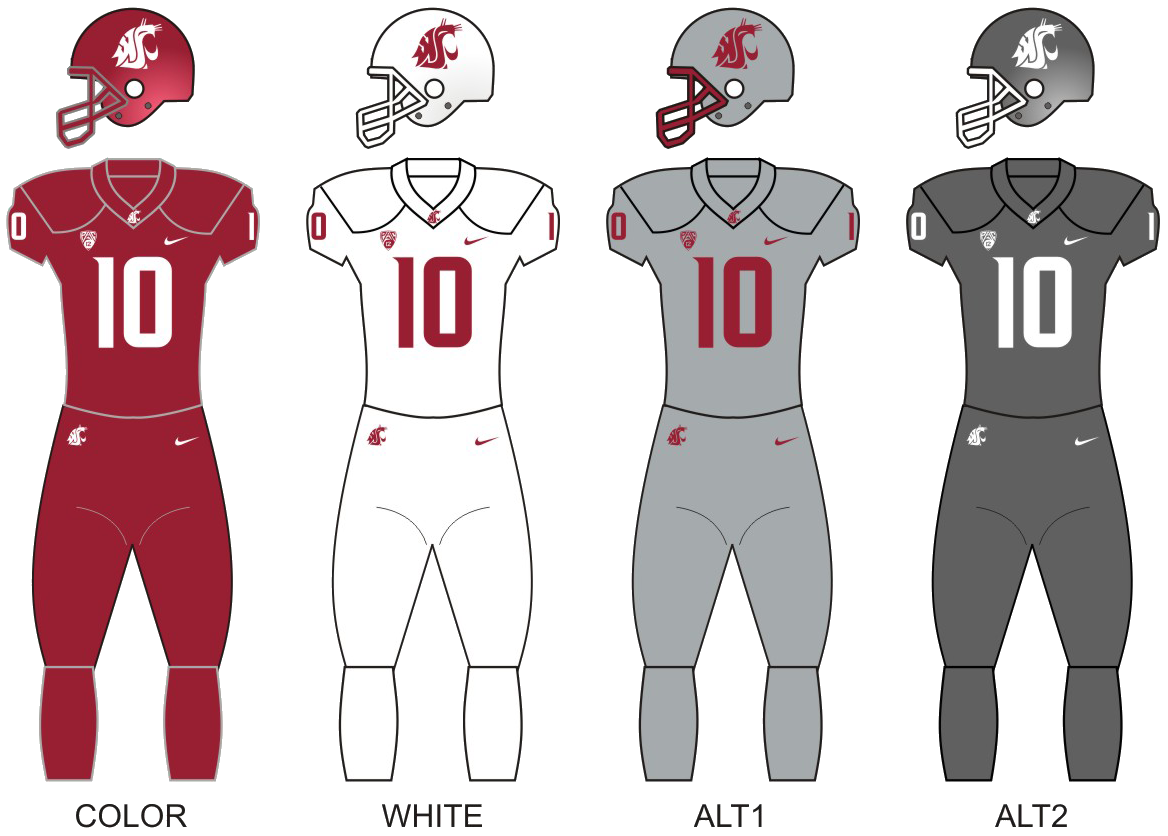

2019 Pac-12 Conference football standings
	Conf.			Overall
Team	W		L	W		L
North Division
No. 5 Oregon xy$	8	–	1	12	–	2
California	4	–	5	8	–	5
Washington	4	–	5	8	–	5
Oregon State	4	–	5	5	–	7
Washington State	3	–	6	6	–	7
Stanford	3	–	6	4	–	8
South Division
No. 16 Utah xy	8	–	1	11	–	3
USC	7	–	2	8	–	5
Arizona State	4	–	5	8	–	5
UCLA	4	–	5	4	–	8
Colorado	3	–	6	5	–	7
Arizona	2	–	7	4	–	8
Championship: Oregon 37, Utah 15
$ – Conference champion; x – Division champion/co-champions; y – Championship game participant; Rankings from AP Poll

The 2019 Washington State Cougars football team represented Washington State University during the 2019 NCAA Division I FBS football season. Led by eighth-year head coach Mike Leach, the Cougars competed in the North Division of the Pac-12 Conference, and played their home games on campus at Martin Stadium in Pullman, Washington.

WSU finished the regular season at 6–6, 3–6 in Pac-12 play, tied for fifth in the Northern Division. They were invited to the Cheez-It Bowl in Phoenix in late December, but lost 31–21 to Air Force. On January 9, Leach departed for Mississippi State, and less than a week later, athletic director Pat Chun hired Hawaii head coach Nick Rolovich.

== Preseason ==
=== Pac-12 media days ===
==== Pac-12 media poll ====
In the Pac-12 preseason media poll, Washington State was voted to finish in fourth place in the North Division and fifth place in the Pac-12 Championship.

== Schedule ==
Date	Time	Opponent	Rank	Site	TV	Result	Attendance
August 31	7:00 p.m.	New Mexico State*	No. 23	Martin Stadium; Pullman, WA	P12N	W 58–7	27,228
September 7	2:00 p.m.	Northern Colorado*	No. 22	Martin Stadium; Pullman, WA	P12N	W 59–17	27,585
September 13	6:15 p.m.	vs. Houston*	No. 20	NRG Stadium; Houston, TX (Texas Kickoff)	ESPN	W 31–24	40,523
September 21	7:30 p.m.	UCLA	No. 19	Martin Stadium; Pullman, WA	ESPN	L 63–67	32,952
September 28	7:00 p.m.	at No. 19 Utah		Rice–Eccles Stadium; Salt Lake City, UT	FS1	L 13–38	46,115
October 12	12:30 p.m.	at No. 18 Arizona State		Sun Devil Stadium; Tempe, AZ	P12N	L 34–38	48,536
October 19	4:00 p.m.	Colorado^{†}		Martin Stadium; Pullman, WA	ESPNU	W 41–10	28,514
October 26	7:30 p.m.	at No. 11 Oregon		Autzen Stadium; Eugene, OR	ESPN	L 35–37	59,361
November 9	4:00 p.m.	at California		California Memorial Stadium; Berkeley, CA	P12N	L 20–33	39,168
November 16	1:30 p.m.	Stanford		Martin Stadium; Pullman, WA	P12N	W 49–22	32,952
November 23	6:00 p.m.	Oregon State		Martin Stadium; Pullman, WA	P12N	W 54–53	22,016
November 29	1:00 p.m.	at Washington		Husky Stadium; Seattle, WA (112th Apple Cup)	FOX	L 13–31	70,931
December 27	7:15 p.m.	vs. Air Force*		Chase Field; Phoenix, AZ (Cheez-It Bowl)	ESPN	L 21–31	34,105
*Non-conference game; ^{†}Homecoming; Rankings from AP Poll and CFP Rankings (after November 5) released prior to game; All times are in Pacific time

Conference opponents not played this season: Arizona, USC

== Rankings ==
Ranking movements Legend: ██ Increase in ranking ██ Decrease in ranking — = Not ranked RV = Received votes
	Week																
Poll	Pre	1	2	3	4	5	6	7	8	9	10	11	12	13	14	15	Final
AP	23	22	20	19	RV	—	—	—	—	—	—	—	—	—	—	—	
Coaches	21	21	20	19	RV	RV	RV	—	—	—	—	—	—	—	—	—	
CFP	Not released										—	—	—	—	—	—	Not released

== Personnel ==
=== Coaching staff ===
Staff for the 2019 season.

Name	Position	Season
Mike Leach	Head coach, offensive coordinator	8th
Darcel McBath and Roc Bellantoni	Co-defensive coordinators	1st
Ken Wilson	Linebackers	5th
Kendrick Shaver	Safeties	1st
Steve Spurrier Jr.	Outside Receivers	1st
Dave Nichol	Inside receivers	2nd
Mason Miller	Offensive line	2nd
Jeff Phelps	Defensive line	2nd
Matt Brock	Outside Linebackers	1st
Eric Mele	Running backs	3rd
Dave Emerick	Chief of staff	6th
Antonio Huffman	Director of Football Operations	6th
Tyson Brown	Strength and conditioning	1st
Price Ferguson	Offensive Quality Control	3rd
Darcel McBath	Defensive backs	2nd

=== Roster ===
2019 Washington State football roster
Quarterbacks: 2 Cammon Cooper – (redshirt) freshman (6'4, 205); 10 Trey Tinsley – (redshirt) senior (6'3, 215); 11 John Bledsoe – (redshirt) sophomore (6'3, 220); 18 Anthony Gordon – (redshirt) senior (6'3, 200); - Gunner Cruz – freshman (6'5, 230); - Gage Gubrud – (redshirt) senior (6'2, 205); Running back: 21 Max Borghi – sophomore (5'10, 195); 31 Dominic Tominiko – (redshirt) freshman (5'9, 243); Fullbacks: 39 Clay Markoff – (redshirt) freshman (5'9, 235); Wide receivers: 1 Davontavean Martin – junior (6'3, 185); 5 Travell Harris – (redshirt) sophomore (5'9, 180); 6 Jamire Calvin – junior (5'10, 160); 8 Easop Winston – (redshirt) senior (5'11, 190); 12 Dezmon Patmon – senior (6'4, 220); 19 Brandon Arconado – (redshirt) senior (6'0, 190); 80 Hayden Harvey – (redshirt) sophomore (6’2, 165); 81 Renard Bell – (redshirt) junior (5'8, 162); 82 Lucas Bacon – (redshirt) freshman (6'2, 205); 83 Brandon Gray – (redshirt) freshman (6'5, 190); 84 Kassidy Woods – (redshirt) freshman (6'4, 205); 85 Calvin Jackson Jr. – senior (5'10, 170); 87 Nicky McManamon Jr. – (redshirt) freshman (6'2, 175); 88 Rodrick Fisher – (redshirt) freshman (6'2, 195); 89 Mitchell Quinn – (redshirt) freshman (5'11 160); - Billy Pospisil III – freshman (5'10, 190)	Offensive linemen: 55 Noah Osur-Myers – (redshirt) senior (6'4, 310); 59 Brian Greene – (redshirt) sophomore (6’3, 305); 61 Hunter Mayginnes – (redshirt) freshman (6’5, 320); 63 Liam Ryan – (redshirt) junior (6’5, 295); 65 Josh Watson – (redshirt) junior (6'4, 300); 66 Jarrett Kingston – (redshirt) freshman (6’5, 260); 67 Seth Yost – (redshirt) sophomore (6'7, 300); 69 Frederick Mauigoa – senior (6'3, 305); 70 Christian Haangana – (redshirt) junior (6’4, 345); 72 Abraham Lucas – (redshirt) sophomore (6’7, 320); 75 Cade Beresford – (redshirt) freshman (6’7, 275); 78 Syr Riley – (redshirt) freshman (6’4, 365); 79 Blake McDonald – (redshirt) freshman (6'5, 330); Defensive linemen: 9 Lamonte McDougle – (redshirt) sophomore (6'0, 305); 30 Nnamdi Oguayo – (redshirt) senior (6’3, 252); 55 Derek Moore – senior (6’1, 250); 64 Michael Van Beek – (redshirt) freshman (6’2, 285); 73 Austin Martin – (redshirt) freshman (6'2, 292); 77 Beau Braden – (redshirt) freshman (6’4, 235); 84 Jesus Echevarria – (redshirt) sophomore (6’2, 300); 90 Misiona Aiolupotea-Pei – senior (6’3, 265); 92 Will Rogers III – junior (6'5, 250); 93 Christian Mejia – (redshirt) sophomore (6’3, 245); 94 Brennan Jackson – (redshirt) freshman (6'5, 235); 95 Ahmir Crowder – (redshirt) freshman (6'3, 255); 96 Cosmas Kwete – freshman (6'3, 250); 98 Dallas Hobbs – (redshirt) sophomore (6’6, 280); Punters: 40 Blake Mazza – (redshirt) sophomore (5'9, 165); 94 Oscar Draguicevich III – (redshirt) junior (5'11, 180)	Linebackers: 10 Ron Stone Jr. – (redshirt) freshman (6’3, 210); 13 Jahad Woods – (redshirt) junior (6'0, 225); 20 Dominick Silvels – junior (6’3, 230); 27 Willie Taylor III – (redshirt) sophomore (6’4, 235); 37 Justus Rogers – (redshirt) junior (6'2, 230); 41 Dillon Sherman – (redshirt) junior (6’2, 225); 44 Tristan Brock – (redshirt) senior (6’0, 240); 48 Isaiah Henderson-Brazie – (redshirt) freshman (6'1, 230); 50 Carson Block – (redshirt) senior (6’1, 235); 51 Hank Pladson – (redshirt) freshman (6'0, 205); 53 Ricky Baker – (redshirt) freshman (5'11, 221); 58 Fa'Avae Fa'Avae – (redshirt) sophomore (6'0, 225); 59 Cole Dubots – (redshirt) sophomore (6'1, 210); - Rocky Katoanga – freshman (6’2, 245); Defensive backs: 1 Tyrese Ross – (redshirt) freshman (6’1, 180); 4 Marcus Strong – senior (5’9, 185); 18 George Hicks III – junior (6’0, 190); 21 William Overstreet – (redshirt) freshman (5'10, 180); 25 Skyler Thomas – (redshirt) junior (5’9, 185); 28 Chad Davis Jr. – (redshirt) sophomore (6'2, 200); 32 Patrick Nunn – (redshirt) freshman (6'4, 205); 34 Jalen Thompson – senior (6'0, 190); 35 Armani Marsh – (redshirt) sophomore (5’8, 175); 36 Kedron Williams – sophomore (6'0, 185); 39 Damion Lee – (redshirt) sophomore (6’0, 195); 42 Halid Djibril – (redshirt) freshman (6'0, 190); - Bryce Beekman – (redshirt) junior (6’2, 185); - Gatlin Grisso – freshman (6’0, 190); - Daniel Isom – (redshirt) junior (5’11, 175); - Derrick Langford – sophomore (6'2, 190); - Shahman Moore – (redshirt) junior (6’1, 165); Placekickers: 27 Logan Prescott – (redshirt) freshman (5'11, 198); 33 Jack Crane – (redshirt) junior (6'2, 190); 96 Johan Zetterberg – (redshirt) sophomore (6'2, 205); Long snappers: 54 Tyler Williams – (redshirt) freshman (6'3, 195)

== Game summaries ==
=== New Mexico State ===
New Mexico State Aggies at No. 23 Washington State Cougars – Game summary

Quarter	1	2	3	4	Total
Aggies	7	0	0	0	7
No. 23 Cougars	14	21	13	10	58

at Martin Stadium, Pullman, Washington

- Date: August 31
- Game time: 7:00 p.m. PDT
- Game weather: Clear, 83 °F (28 °C)
- Game attendance: 27,228
- Referee: Brandon Cruse
- TV announcers (P12N): Guy Haberman, Chad Brown, and Samantha Peszek
- Box score, Recap

Statistics	NMSU	WSU
First downs	18	28
Total yards	317	618
Rushing yards	96	111
Passing yards	221	507
Turnovers	3	0
Time of possession	25:19	34:41

Team	Category	Player	Statistics
New Mexico State	Passing	Josh Adkins	28/42, 221 yards, 2 INT
New Mexico State	Rushing	Jason Huntley	9 rushes, 57 yards
New Mexico State	Receiving	O. J. Clark	7 receptions, 47 yards
Washington State	Passing	Anthony Gordon	29/35, 420 yards, 5 TD
Washington State	Rushing	Max Borghi	10 rushes, 128 yards, TD
Washington State	Receiving	Dezmon Patmon	7 receptions, 103 yards, TD

=== Northern Colorado ===
Northern Colorado Bears at No. 22 Washington State Cougars – Game summary

Quarter	1	2	3	4	Total
Bears	7	3	0	7	17
No. 22 Cougars	14	10	21	14	59

at Martin Stadium, Pullman, Washington

- Date: September 7
- Game time: 2:00 p.m. PDT
- Game weather: Partly cloudy, 80 °F (27 °C)
- Game attendance: 27,585
- Referee: Mark Duddy
- TV announcers (P12N): Jim Watson and Jeremy Bloom
- Box score, Recap

Statistics	UNCO	WSU
First downs	21	25
Total yards	355	594
Rushing yards	216	113
Passing yards	139	481
Turnovers	4	1
Time of possession	36:01	23:59

Team	Category	Player	Statistics
Northern Colorado	Passing	Jacob Knipp	8/15, 128 yards
Northern Colorado	Rushing	Milo Hall	31 rushes, 113 yards, TD
Northern Colorado	Receiving	Noah Sol	2 receptions, 47 yards
Washington State	Passing	Anthony Gordon	31/39, 464 yards, 4 TD, INT
Washington State	Rushing	Deon McIntosh	4 rushes, 52 yards, TD
Washington State	Receiving	Brandon Arconado	8 receptions, 127 yards, TD

=== Vs. Houston ===
No. 20 Washington State Cougars vs. Houston Cougars – Game summary

Quarter	1	2	3	4	Total
No. 20 WSU Cougars	0	7	14	10	31
HOU Cougars	0	14	0	10	24

at NRG Stadium, Houston, Texas

- Date: September 13
- Game time: 6:15 p.m. PDT/8:15 p.m. CDT
- Game weather: None (retractable roof closed)
- Game attendance: 40,523
- Referee: Steve Strimling
- TV announcers (ESPN): Dave Flemming, Louis Riddick, and Paul Carcaterra
- Box score, Recap

Statistics	WSU	HOU
First downs	25	22
Total yards	489	367
Rushing yards	49	239
Passing yards	440	128
Turnovers	1	2
Time of possession	32:06	27:54

Team	Category	Player	Statistics
Washington State	Passing	Anthony Gordon	36/48, 440 yards, 3 TD, INT
Washington State	Rushing	Max Borghi	9 rushes, 40 yards, TD
Washington State	Receiving	Brandon Arconado	3 receptions, 115 yards
Houston	Passing	D'Eriq King	13/24, 128 yards, TD
Houston	Rushing	D'Eriq King	17 rushes, 94 yards, 2 TD
Houston	Receiving	Keith Corbin	3 receptions, 54 yards

=== UCLA ===
UCLA Bruins at Washington State Cougars – Game summary

Quarter	1	2	3	4	Total
Bruins	10	7	21	29	67
No. 19 Cougars	7	28	14	14	63

at Martin Stadium, Pullman, Washington

- Date: September 21
- Game time: 7:30 p.m. PDT
- Game weather: Clear, 62 °F (17 °C)
- Game attendance: 32,952
- Referee: Chris Coyte
- TV announcers (ESPN): Beth Mowins, Anthony Becht, and Rocky Boiman
- Box score, Recap

Game information
First quarter
- UCLA – Joshua Kelley 14-yard pass from Dorian Thompson-Robinson (J. J. Molson kick), 13:11. Bruins 7–0. Drive: 3 plays, 29 yards, 0:34.
- WSU – Easop Winston 4-yard pass from Anthony Gordon (Blake Mazza kick), 10:14. Tied 7–7. Drive: 9 plays, 75 yards, 2:57.
- UCLA – J. J. Molson 31-yard field goal, 4:49. Bruins 10–7. Drive: 13 plays, 62 yards, 5:25.

Second quarter

- WSU – Easop Winston 28-yard pass from Anthony Gordon (Blake Mazza kick), 13:02. Cougars 14–10. Drive: 5 plays, 78 yards, 1:58.
- WSU – Travell Harris 10-yard pass from Anthony Gordon (Blake Mazza kick), 8:14. Cougars 21–10. Drive: 2 plays, 14 yards, 0:41.
- UCLA – Demetric Fulton 100-yard kickoff return (J. J. Molson kick), 7:58. Cougars 21–17.
- WSU – Easop Winston 3-yard pass from Anthony Gordon (Blake Mazza kick), 3:51. Cougars 28–17. Drive: 8 plays, 60 yards, 4:07.
- WSU – Davontavean Martin 7-yard pass from Anthony Gordon (Blake Mazza kick), 0:27. Cougars 35–17. Drive: 7 plays, 90 yards, 2:20.

Third quarter

- WSU – Renard Bell 35-yard pass from Anthony Gordon (Blake Mazza kick), 8:09. Cougars 42–17. Drive: 8 plays, 80 yards, 4:06.
- WSU – Dezmon Patmon 6-yard pass from Anthony Gordon (Blake Mazza kick), 6:52. Cougars 49–17. Drive: 1 play, 6 yards, 0:04.
- UCLA – Dorian Thompson-Robinson 1-yard run (J. J. Molson kick), 3:48. Cougars 49–24. Drive: 9 plays, 75 yards, 3:04.
- UCLA – Chase Cota 37-yard pass from Dorian Thompson-Robinson (J. J. Molson kick), 3:33. Cougars 49–31. Drive: 1 play, 37 yards, 0:07.
- UCLA – Demetric Felton 94-yard pass from Dorian Thompson-Robinson (J. J. Molson kick), 1:21. Cougars 49–38. Drive: 1 play, 94 yards, 0:13.

Fourth quarter

- UCLA – Devin Asiasi 7-yard pass from Dorian Thompson-Robinson (Dorian Thompson-Robinson pass to Chase Cota), 14:28. Cougars 49–46. Drive: 4 plays, 51 yards, 1:08.
- WSU – Easop Winston 33-yard pass from Anthony Gordon (Blake Mazza kick), 10:08. Cougars 56–46. Drive: 9 plays, 75 yards, 4:20.
- UCLA – Dorian Thompson-Robinson 3-yard run (J. J. Molson kick), 8:10. Cougars 56–53. Drive: 6 plays, 70 yards, 1:58.
- UCLA – Kyle Philips 69-yard punt return (J. J. Molson kick), 7:31. Bruins 60–56.
- WSU – Max Broghi 65-yard pass from Anthony Gordon (Blake Mazza kick), 6:11. Cougars 63–60. Drive: 5 plays, 75 yards, 1:20.
- UCLA – Demetric Felton 15-yard pass from Dorian Thompson-Robinson (J. J. Molson kick), 1:07. Bruins 67–63. Drive: 4 plays, 26 yards, 1:20.

Statistics	UCLA	WSU
First downs	28	28
Total yards	657	720
Rushing yards	150	150
Passing yards	507	570
Turnovers	1	6
Time of possession	29:27	30:33

Team	Category	Player	Statistics
UCLA	Passing	Dorian Thompson-Robinson	25/38, 507 yards, 5 TD, INT
UCLA	Rushing	Joshua Kelley	20 rushes, 90 yards
UCLA	Receiving	Demetric Felton	7 receptions, 150 yards, 2 TD
Washington State	Passing	Anthony Gordon	41/61, 570 yards, 9 TD, 2 INT
Washington State	Rushing	Max Borghi	15 rushes, 123 yards
Washington State	Receiving	Easop Winston	10 receptions, 114 yards, 4 TD

After a back-and-forth first quarter, the Cougars jumped out to a 49–17 lead midway through the third quarter. However, turnovers on offense, a collapsing defense, and giving up a touchdown on special teams would prove costly for Washington State as UCLA would come back to win 67–63. Washington State quarterback Anthony Gordon broke the school record for touchdown passes, throwing for nine in the game; the previous record of seven was set by Gardner Minshew the previous season against Arizona.

=== At Utah ===
	1	2	3	4	Total
Cougars	7	6	0	0	13
Utes	7	14	10	7	38

=== At Arizona State ===
	1	2	3	4	Total
Cougars	10	7	14	3	34
No. 18 Sun Devils	0	17	7	14	38

=== Colorado ===
	1	2	3	4	Total
Buffaloes	3	0	7	0	10
Cougars	21	3	7	10	41

=== At Oregon ===
	1	2	3	4	Total
Cougars	3	14	3	15	35
No. 11 Ducks	9	8	7	13	37

=== At California ===
	1	2	3	4	Total
Cougars	5	6	3	6	20
Golden Bears	6	7	7	13	33

=== Stanford ===
	1	2	3	4	Total
Cardinal	0	14	8	0	22
Cougars	13	9	10	17	49

=== Oregon State ===
Oregon State Beavers (5–5) at Washington State Cougars (5–5)

Quarter	1	2	3	4	Total
Beavers	7	17	0	29	53
Cougars	7	14	14	19	54

at Martin Stadium, Pullman, Washington

- Date: November 23, 2019
- Game time: 6:00 p.m. PST
- Game weather: Partly cloudy, 38 °F (3 °C)
- Game attendance: 22,016
- Referee: Kevin Mar
- TV: Pac-12 Network
- Box Score

Game information

First quarter

- OSU – Jermar Jefferson 54-yard run (Everett Hayes kick), 9:16. Oregon St 7–0. Drive: 5 plays, 99 yards, 1:57.
- WSU – Dezmon Patmon 12-yard pass from Anthony Gordon (Blake Mazza kick), 2:17. Tie 7–7. Drive: 8 plays, 62 yards, 2:51.

Second quarter

- OSU – Champ Fleming 46-yard pass from Jake Luton (Everett Hayes kick), 12:38. Oregon St 14–7. Drive: 4 plays, 69 yards, 2:06.
- WSU – Renard Bell 10-yard pass from Anthony Gordon (Blake Mazza kick), 9:24. Tie 14–14. Drive: 7 plays, 75 yards, 3:14.
- WSU – Deon McIntosh 33-yard pass from Anthony Gordon (Blake Mazza kick), 4:51. Washington St 21–14. Drive: 4 plays, 73 yards, 2:12.
- OSU – Noah Togiai 18-yard pass from Jake Luton (Everett Hayes kick), 2:20. Tie 21–21. Drive: 7 plays, 75 yards, 2:31.
- OSU – Everett Hayes 47-yard field goal, 0:26. Oregon St 24–21. Drive: 6 plays, 23 yards, 0:42.

Third quarter

- WSU – Calvin Jackson 36-yard pass from Anthony Gordon (Blake Mazza kick), 8:06. Washington St 28–24. Drive: 4 plays, 58 yards, 1:29.
- WSU – Renard Bell 10-yard pass from Anthony Gordon (Blake Mazza kick), 1:44. Washington St 35–24. Drive: 9 plays, 82 yards, 4:56.

Fourth quarter

- OSU – Teagan Quitoriano 28-yard pass from Jake Luton (run good), 13:42. Washington St 35–32. Drive: 8 plays, 75 yards, 3:02.
- WSU – Max Borghi 1-yard run (Blake Mazza kick), 9:52. Washington St 42–32. Drive: 8 plays, 75 yards, 3:50.
- OSU – Jermar Jefferson 5-yard run (Everett Hayes kick), 7:32. Washington St 42–39. Drive: 6 plays, 69 yards, 2:22.
- OSU – Jermar Jefferson 39-yard pass from Jake Luton (Everett Hayes kick), 6:45. Oregon St 46–42. Drive: 3 plays, 51 yards, 0:45.
- OSU – Jermar Jefferson 2-yard pass from Jake Luton (Everett Hayes kick), 4:17. Oregon St 53–42. Drive: 5 plays, 27 yards, 2:19.
- WSU – Dezmon Patmon 14-yard pass from Anthony Gordon (pass failed), 2:10. Oregon St 53–48. Drive: 7 plays, 75 yards, 2:07.
- WSU – Max Borghi 2-yard run (run failed), 0:02. Washington St 54–53. Drive: 10 plays, 58 yards, 1:08.

Top passers

- OSU – Jake Luton – 22/40, 408 yards, 5 TD, int
- WSU – Anthony Gordon – 50/68, 606 yards, 6 TD, 3 int

Top rushers

- OSU – Jermar Jefferson – 21 rushes, 132 yards, 2 TD
- WSU – Max Borghi – 10 rushes, 44 yards, 2 TD

Top receivers

- OSU – Champ Fleming – 4 receptions, 110 yards, TD
- WSU – Renard Bell – 8 receptions, 108 yards, 2 TD

=== At Washington ===
Washington State Cougars (6–5) at Washington Huskies (6–5)

Quarter	1	2	3	4	Total
Cougars	7	3	3	0	13
Huskies	7	14	7	3	31

at Husky Stadium • Seattle, WA

- Date: November 29, 2019
- Game time: 1:00 p.m. PDT
- Game attendance: 70,931
- TV: FOX/FS1

Game information

Top passers

- WSU – Anthony Gordon – 48-62, 308 yards, 2 INT
- UW – Jacob Eason – 15-22, 244 yards, 1 TD

Top rushers

- WSU – Max Borghi – 10 carries, 50 yards, 1 TD
- UW – Salvon Ahmed – 16 carries, 85 yards

Top receiving

- WSU – Renard Bell – 9 receptions, 87 yards
- UW – Hunter Bryant – 6 receptions, 96 yards

=== Vs. Air Force (Cheez-It Bowl) ===
	1	2	3	4	Total
Falcons	0	17	7	7	31
Cougars	0	14	0	7	21

== Awards ==
Player	Award	Date
Anthony Gordon	Pac-12 Offensive Player of the Week	September 3, 2019
Liam Ryan	Pac-12 Offensive Line Player of the Week	September 3, 2019
Anthony Gordon	Pac-12 Offensive Player of the Week	September 16, 2019
Anthony Gordon	Pac-12 Offensive Player of the Week	November 18, 2019
Abraham Lucas	Pac-12 Offensive Lineman of the Week	November 25, 2019
Anthony Gordon	2019 All-Pac-12 Conference Second Team Offense	December 10, 2019
Abraham Lucas	2019 All-Pac-12 Conference Second Team Offense	December 10, 2019
Blake Mazza	2019 All-Pac-12 Conference First Team Specialists	December 10, 2019
Travion Brown	2019 All-Pac-12 Conference Second Team Specialists	December 10, 2019
Max Borghi	2019 All-Pac-12 Conference Honorable Mention	December 10, 2019
Josh Watson	2019 All-Pac-12 Conference Honorable Mention	December 10, 2019
Easop Winston	2019 All-Pac-12 Conference Honorable Mention	December 10, 2019
Jahad Woods	2019 All-Pac-12 Conference Honorable Mention	December 10, 2019

== NFL draft ==
Player	Position	Round	Overall	NFL club
Dezmon Patmon	WR	6	212	Indianapolis Colts
