= 2019 Cheez-It Bowl =

Postseason college football bowl game

- 31st Cheez-It Bowl
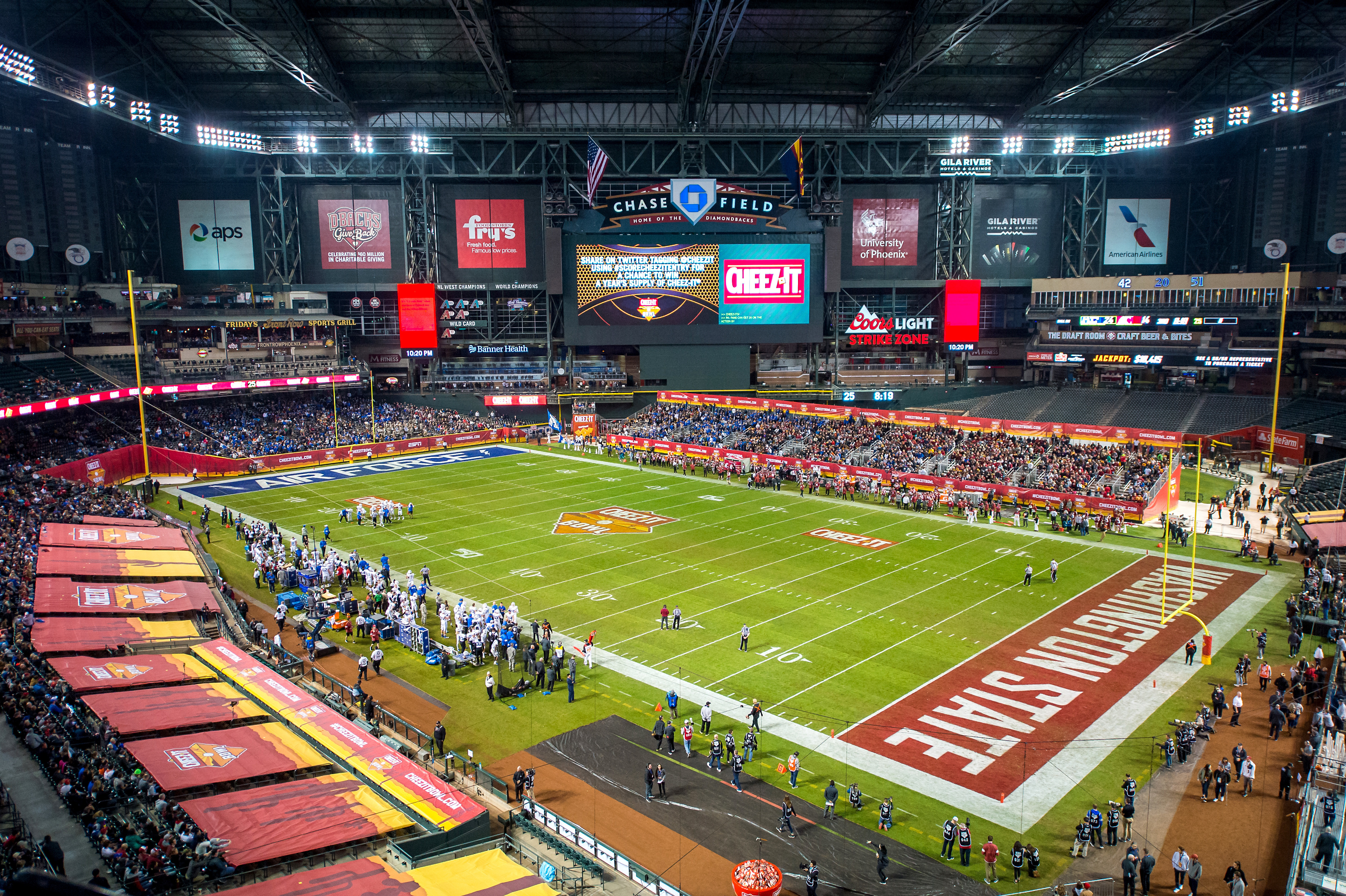
- Chase Field prior to the game
Air Force Falcons	Washington State Cougars
(10–2)	(6–6)
Mountain West	Pac-12
31	21
Head coach: Troy Calhoun	Head coach: Mike Leach
AP / Coaches / CFP; 24 / 24 / NR
	1	2	3	4	Total
Air Force	0	17	7	7	31
Washington State	0	14	0	7	21
- Date: December 27, 2019
- Season: 2019
- Stadium: Chase Field
- Location: Phoenix, Arizona
- MVP: Kadin Remsberg (RB, Air Force) & Grant Donaldson (LB, Air Force)
- Favorite: Air Force by 2.5
- Referee: Jeff Servinski (Big Ten)
- Attendance: 34,105
- Payout: US$1,625,560

United States TV coverage
- Network: ESPN and ESPN Radio
- Announcers: ESPN: Clay Matvick (play-by-play); Ryan Leaf (analyst); Taylor McGregor (sideline); ESPN Radio: Mark Neely, Tom Ramsey, and Marty Cesario

The 2019 Cheez-It Bowl was a college football bowl game played on December 27, 2019, with kickoff at 10:15 p.m. EST (8:15 p.m. local MST) on ESPN. It was the 31st edition of the game originally staged as the Copper Bowl, the second edition played under the sponsorship of Cheez-It, and one of the 2019–20 bowl games concluding the 2019 FBS football season.

== Teams ==
The game matched the Air Force Falcons from the Mountain West Conference (MWC) and the Washington State Cougars from the Pac-12 Conference. This was the first meeting between the two programs.

=== Air Force Falcons ===
Air Force entered the game ranked 24th in the AP Poll, with a 10–2 record (7–1 in conference) and a seven-game winning streak. The Falcons finished in second place in the Mountain Division of Mountain West. This was Air Force's second Cheez-It Bowl; their 1995 team appeared in the then-Copper Bowl, losing to Texas Tech, 55–41.

=== Washington State Cougars ===
Washington State entered the game at 6–6 (3–6 in conference). The Cougars tied for fifth place in the Pac-12's North Division. This was Washington State's second Cheez-It Bowl; their 1992 team won the then-Copper Bowl over Utah, 31–28.

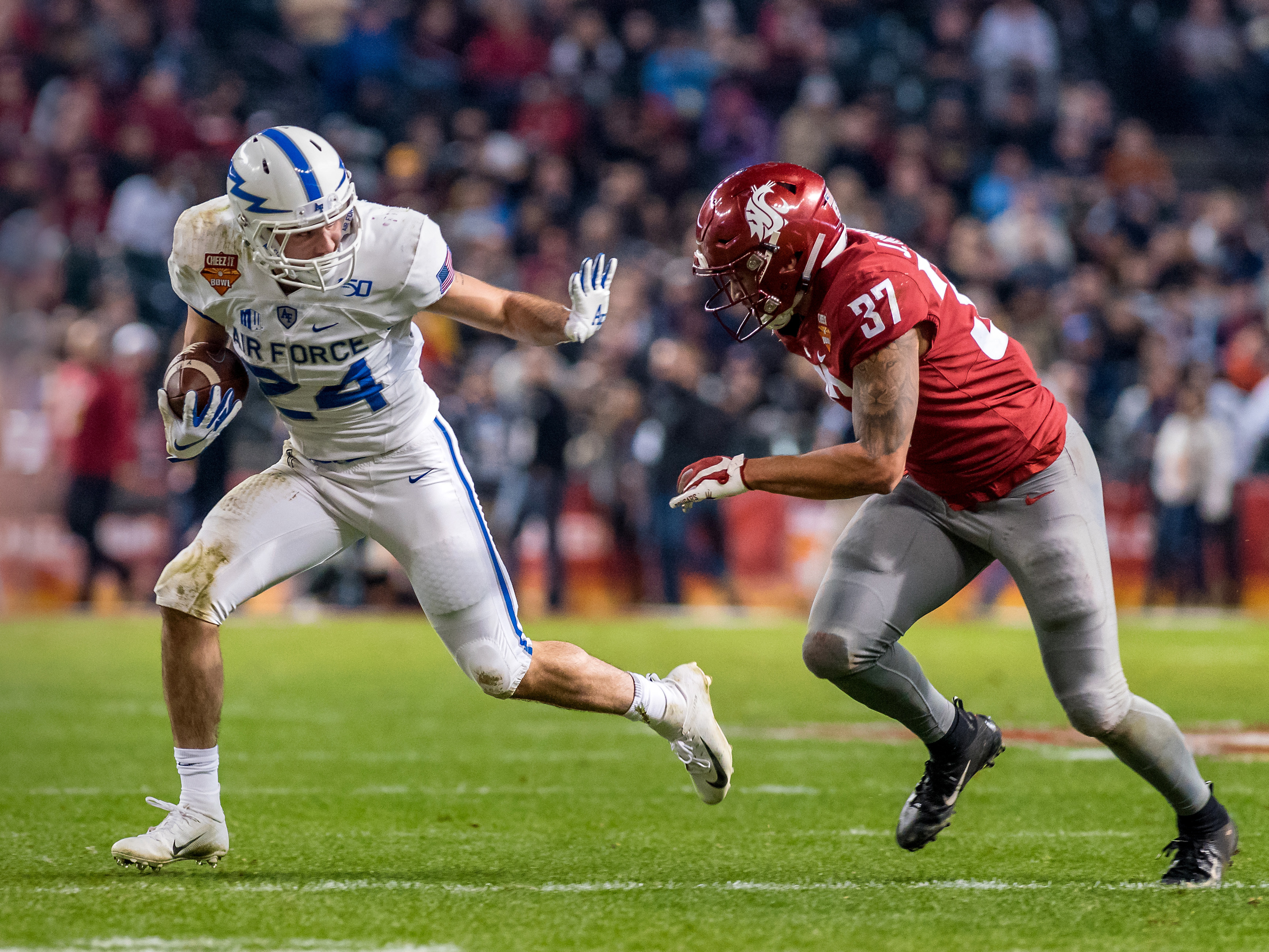
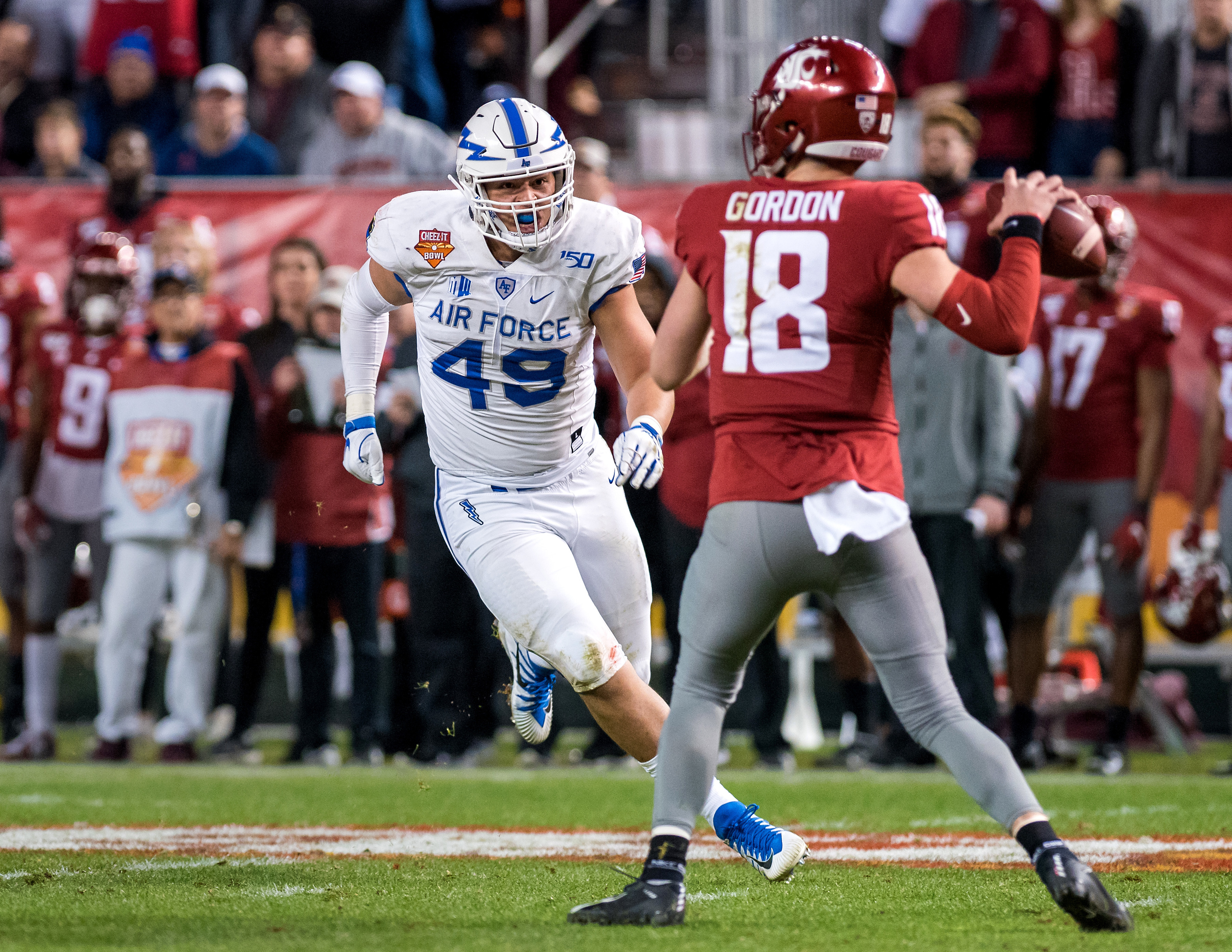
Left: Kadin Remsberg of Air Force (with ball) and Justus Rogers of Washington State. Right: Anthony Gordon of Washington State (with ball) and Christopher Herrera of Air Force.

== Game summary ==
2019 Cheez-It Bowl

Quarter	1	2	3	4	Total
Air Force	0	17	7	7	31
Washington State	0	14	0	7	21

at Chase Field • Phoenix, Arizona

- Date: Friday, December 27, 2019
- Game time: 10:15 p.m. EST (8:15 p.m. MST)
- Referee: Jeff Servinski
- TV announcers (ESPN): Clay Matvick (play-by-play), Ryan Leaf (analyst) and Cole Cubelic (sideline)
- ESPN game summary

Game information

First Quarter
No scoring
Second Quarter

- (14:52) AF – Donald Hammond III 1 yard rush, Jake Koehnke kick (Drive: 20 plays, 98 yards, 12:23; Air Force 7–0)
- (10:43) WSU – Anthony Gordon 2 yard pass to Dezmon Patmon, Blake Mazza kick (Drive: 11 plays, 74 yards, 4:09; Tied 7–7)
- (3:39) AF – Jake Koehnke 28 yard field goal (Drive: 15 plays, 65 yards, 7:04; Air Force 10–7)
- (1:19) AF – Taven Birdow 3 yard rush, Jake Koehnke kick (Drive: 4 plays, 23 yards, 2:08; Air Force 17–7)
- (0:24) WSU – Anthony Gordon 5 yard pass to Max Borghi, Blake Mazza kick (Drive: 5 plays, 75 yards, 0:55; Air Force 17–14)

Third Quarter

- (8:19) AF – Donald Hammond III 7 yard rush, Jack Koehnke kick (Drive: 13 plays, 75 yards, 6:41; Air Force 24–14)

Fourth Quarter

- (9:59) WSU – Anthony Gordon 13 yard pass to Brandon Arconado, Blake Mazza kick (Drive: 4 plays, 31 yards, 1:16; Air Force 24–21)
- (3:50) AF – Kadin Remsberg 3 yard rush, Jake Koehnke kick (Drive: 10 plays, 60 yards, 6:09; Air Force 31–21)

=== Statistics ===
Statistics	AF	WSU
First downs	28	15
Plays–yards	81–401	50–366
Rushes–yards	69–371	8–15
Passing yards	30	351
Passing: comp–att–int	4–12–1	28–42–0
Time of possession	43:23	16:37

Team	Category	Player	Statistics
Air Force	Passing	Donald Hammond III	4–12, 30 yds, 1 INT
Air Force	Rushing	Kadin Remsberg	26 car., 178 yds, 1 TD
Air Force	Receiving	Benjamin Waters	2 rec., 12 yds
Washington State	Passing	Anthony Gordon	28–42, 351 yds, 3 TD
Washington State	Rushing	Max Borghi	6 car., 27 yds
Washington State	Receiving	Brandon Arconado	11 rec., 167 yds, 1 TD

== See also ==
- 2020 Cheez-It Bowl, the next so-named bowl game, played at Camping World Stadium in Orlando, Florida
