= Anthony Gordon (American football) =

American football player (born 1997)

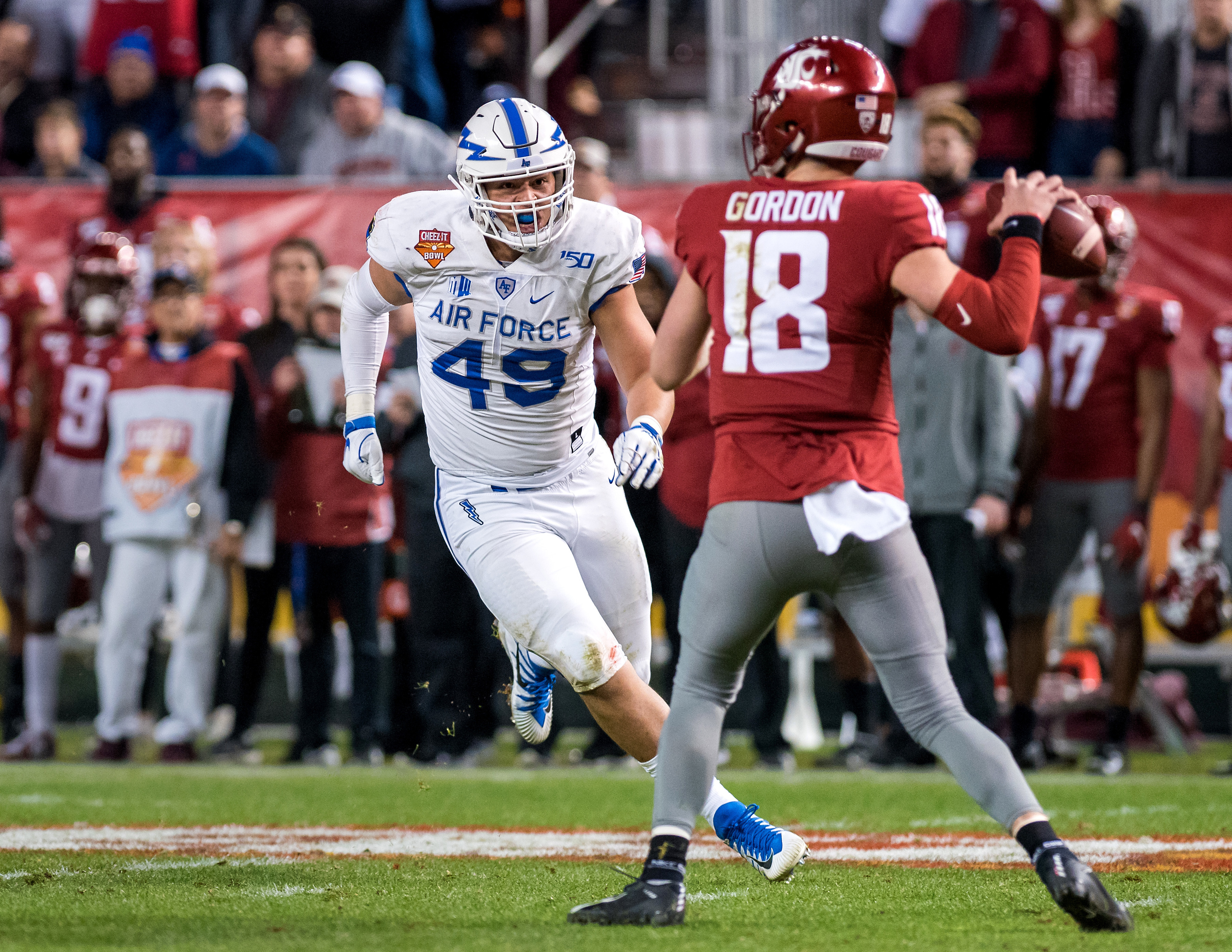
- Gordon at the 2019 Cheez-It Bowl

No. 18
- Position: Quarterback

Personal information
- Born: August 28, 1997 (age 29); Pacifica, California, U.S.
- Listed height: 6 ft 3 in (1.91 m)
- Listed weight: 210 lb (95 kg)

Career information
- High school: Terra Nova (Pacifica)
- College: Washington State
- NFL draft: 2020: undrafted

Career history
- Seattle Seahawks (2020)*; Kansas City Chiefs (2021)*; Denver Broncos (2021)*; Kansas City Chiefs (2022)*
- * Offseason or practice squad member only

Awards and highlights
- Second-team All-Pac-12 (2019)
- Stats at Pro Football Reference

Anthony Gordon (born August 28, 1997) is an American former football quarterback. He played college football for the Washington State Cougars and went undrafted in the 2020 NFL draft. He was a member of the Seattle Seahawks, Kansas City Chiefs, and Denver Broncos organizations during his three seasons in the National Football League (NFL).

== Early life ==
Gordon attended Terra Nova High School in Pacifica, California. During his career he passed for 8,305 yards and 81 touchdowns.

== College career ==
Gordon played at City College of San Francisco in 2015. In the one season, he completed 286 of 439 passes for 3,864 yards and 37 touchdowns.

In 2016 he transferred to Washington State University. He redshirted his first year in 2016 and did not play in any games in 2017. In 2018, he served as the backup to Gardner Minshew. In 2019, Gordon was named the starter and threw for 48 TDs, second most in the nation behind Heisman Trophy winner Joe Burrow, who went first overall in the 2020 NFL draft.

=== Statistics ===
Season	Team	Passing							
Season	Team	Cmp	Att	Pct	Yds	Avg	TD	Int	Rtg
2015	City College of San Francisco	286	439	65.1	3,864	8.8	37	13	161.0
2016	Washington State	0	Redshirted						
2017	Washington State	0	DNP						
2018	Washington State	3	5	60.0	17	3.4	0	1	48.6
2019	Washington State	493	689	71.6	5,579	8.1	48	16	157.9
NCAA career		496	694	71.5	5,596	8.1	48	17	157.1

== Professional career ==
Pre-draft measurables
Height	Weight	Arm length	Hand span	Wingspan	Wonderlic
6 ft 2 3/8 in (1.89 m)	205 lb (93 kg)	31 in (0.79 m)	9 3/4 in (0.25 m)	6 ft 1 in (1.85 m)	25
All values from NFL Combine

=== Seattle Seahawks ===
Gordon signed with the Seattle Seahawks as an undrafted free agent on May 1, 2020. He was waived on September 5.

=== Kansas City Chiefs ===
On January 12, 2021, Gordon signed a reserve/futures contract with the Kansas City Chiefs. He was waived on August 23.

=== Denver Broncos ===
On December 21, 2021, Gordon was signed to the Denver Broncos' practice squad.

=== Kansas City Chiefs (second stint) ===
On April 27, 2022, Gordon signed with the Kansas City Chiefs. He was waived on May 10.

On July 28, 2023, it was reported that Gordon had joined the Arlington Renegades of the XFL. However, Gordon disputed the claim via Twitter, and stated that he had retired from football.

== Personal life ==
His uncle, Greg Reynolds, played professional baseball for the Colorado Rockies and Cincinnati Reds of Major League Baseball (MLB).
