= Max Borghi =

American football player (born 1999)

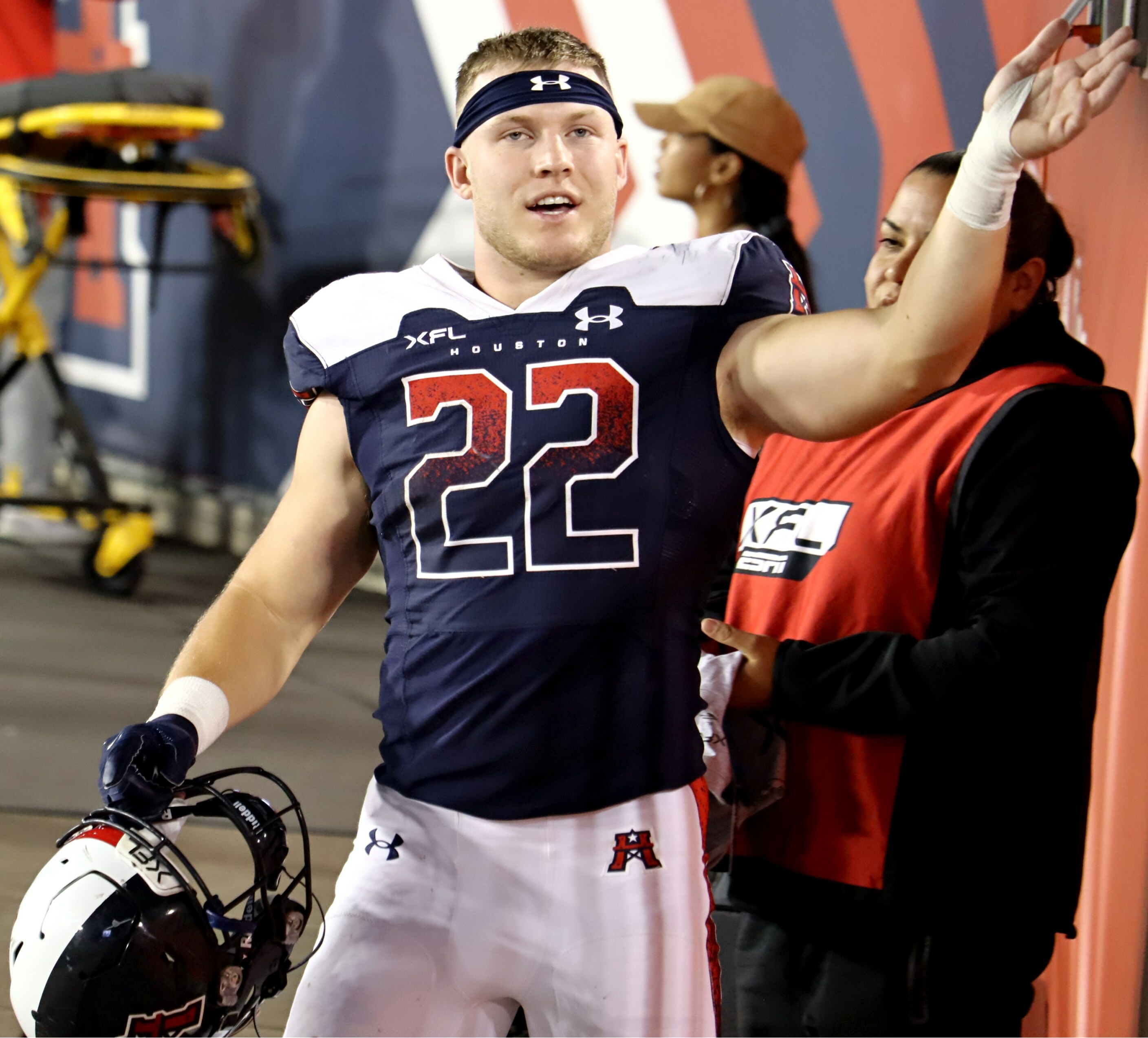
- Borghi with the Houston Roughnecks in 2023

No. 22
- Position: Running back

Personal information
- Born: April 23, 1999 (age 27); Arvada, Colorado, U.S.
- Listed height: 5 ft 10 in (1.78 m)
- Listed weight: 205 lb (93 kg)

Career information
- High school: Pomona (Arvada)
- College: Washington State (2018–2021)
- NFL draft: 2022: undrafted

Career history
- Indianapolis Colts (2022)*; Denver Broncos (2022)*; Pittsburgh Steelers (2022)*; Houston Roughnecks (2023); St. Louis Battlehawks (2024)*
- * Offseason or practice squad member only
- Stats at Pro Football Reference

Massimiliano Christopher Borghi (born April 23, 1999) is an American former professional football running back. He played college football at Washington State.

== Early life ==
Borghi attended Pomona High School in Arvada, Colorado. As a 5th year senior, he had 1,690 rushing yards with 27 touchdowns and helped lead his school to their first state title since 1988. During his high school career, he rushed for 3,512 yards and 50 touchdowns. He committed to Washington State University to play college football.

== College career ==
As a true freshman at Washington State in 2018, Borghi played in all 13 games and made two starts. He had 72 carries for 366 yards and 53 receptions for 374 yards with 12 total touchdowns. As a sophomore in 2019 he started all 13 games, rushing for 817 yards on 127 carries with 11 touchdowns and a team leading 86 receptions for 597 yards and five touchdowns.

== Professional career ==
Pre-draft measurables
Height	Weight	Arm length	Hand span	Wingspan	40-yard dash	10-yard split	20-yard split	20-yard shuttle	Three-cone drill	Vertical jump	Broad jump	Bench press
5 ft 9 3/8 in (1.76 m)	210 lb (95 kg)	29 5/8 in (0.75 m)	9 1/8 in (0.23 m)	5 ft 10 1/2 in (1.79 m)	4.52 s	1.53 s	2.63 s	4.27 s	7.15 s	33.5 in (0.85 m)	10 ft 3 in (3.12 m)	20 reps
All values from NFL Combine/Pro Day

=== Indianapolis Colts ===
Borghi signed with the Indianapolis Colts as an undrafted free agent on May 13, 2022. He was waived on May 18.

=== Denver Broncos ===
On August 3, 2022, Borghi signed with the Denver Broncos. He was released on August 16, 2022.

=== Pittsburgh Steelers ===
On August 18, 2022, Borghi signed with the Pittsburgh Steelers. He was waived on August 30.

=== Houston Roughnecks ===
On November 17, 2022, Borghi was drafted by the Houston Roughnecks of the XFL. Borghi played in eight games, rushing for 310 yards on 78 attempts, with six touchdowns. He was waived on December 15, 2023.

=== St. Louis Battlehawks ===
The St. Louis Battlehawks claimed Borghi off waivers on December 15, 2023. Borghi decided not to play football during the 2024 UFL season on January 27, 2024, and was subsequently waived by the Battlehawks on February 8.

== Career statistics ==
=== XFL ===
Year	League	Team	Games	Rushing				Receiving				Fumbles	
Year	League	Team	Games	Att	Yds	Avg	TD	Rec	Yds	Avg	TD	Fum	Lost
2023	XFL	HOU	8	78	310	4.0	6	21	139	6.6	0	0	0
Career			8	78	310	4.0	6	21	139	6.6	0	0	0

=== College ===
Borghi's college statistics are as follows:

Washington State Cougars
Season	Rushing				Receiving			
Season	Att	Yards	Avg	TD	Rec	Yards	Avg	TD
2018	72	366	5.1	8	53	374	7.1	4
2019	127	817	6.4	11	86	597	6.9	5
2020	10	95	9.5	1	1	7	7	0
2021	160	880	5.5	12	16	156	9.8	0
Career	369	2,158	5.8	32	156	1,134	7.3	9
