= Dezmon Patmon =

American gridiron football player (born 1998)

Profile
- Position: Wide receiver

Personal information
- Born: August 6, 1998 (age 28); San Diego, California, U.S.
- Listed height: 6 ft 4 in (1.93 m)
- Listed weight: 225 lb (102 kg)

Career information
- High school: Patrick Henry (San Diego)
- College: Washington State (2016–2019)
- NFL draft: 2020: 6th round, 212th overall pick

Career history
- Indianapolis Colts (2020–2022); Buffalo Bills (2022)*; Carolina Panthers (2023)*; Michigan Panthers (2024)*; BC Lions (2024)*; Hamilton Tiger-Cats (2024)
- * Offseason or practice squad member only

Career NFL statistics
- Receptions: 4
- Receiving yards: 45
- Receiving touchdowns: 1
- Stats at Pro Football Reference
- Stats at CFL.ca

Dezmon Patmon (born August 6, 1998) is an American professional football wide receiver. He was drafted in the sixth round of the 2020 NFL draft by the Indianapolis Colts. He played college football at Washington State.

== College career ==
A three-star recruit, Patmon committed to play college football at Washington State over offers from Boise State, California, and UNLV. He was a two-year starter at Washington State. As a junior, he led the team with 816 receiving yards and his 61 receptions and 816 receiving yards were eighth in the Pac-12 Conference. In his senior season, he made 58 receptions for 762 yards and eight touchdowns. In his career, Patmon caught 156 passes for 1,976 yards and 13 touchdowns.

== Professional career ==
Pre-draft measurables
Height	Weight	Arm length	Hand span	Wingspan	40-yard dash	10-yard split	20-yard split	20-yard shuttle	Three-cone drill	Vertical jump	Broad jump	Bench press
6 ft 3 3/4 in (1.92 m)	225 lb (102 kg)	32 3/4 in (0.83 m)	10 1/4 in (0.26 m)	6 ft 6 in (1.98 m)	4.48 s	1.57 s	2.64 s	4.38 s	7.28 s	36.0 in (0.91 m)	11 ft 0 in (3.35 m)	15 reps
All values from NFL Combine

=== Indianapolis Colts ===
Patmon was selected by the Indianapolis Colts in the sixth round (212th overall) in the 2020 NFL draft.

On September 2, 2021, Patmon was placed on injured reserve to start the season. He was activated on November 4. Patmon scored his first career touchdown on December 25, in the team's Week 15 matchup against the Arizona Cardinals, that put the Colts up 22–13.

On October 4, 2022, Patmon was waived by the Colts. He was re-signed to the Colts' practice squad the following day.

=== Buffalo Bills ===
On January 17, 2023, Patmon was signed to the Buffalo Bills' practice squad. He signed a reserve/future contract with Buffalo on January 23. Patmon was waived by the Bills on August 27.

=== Carolina Panthers ===
On September 5, 2023, Patmon signed with the Carolina Panthers' practice squad. He was released by the Panthers on September 12.

=== Michigan Panthers ===
On February 5, 2024, Patmon signed with the Michigan Panthers of the United Football League (UFL). He was removed from the team's roster on March 21.

=== BC Lions ===
On March 25, 2024, Patmon signed with the BC Lions of the Canadian Football League (CFL). He was released by the Lions on May 15.

=== Hamilton Tiger-Cats ===
On May 27, 2024, Patmon signed with the Hamilton Tiger-Cats of the Canadian Football League (CFL). He was released by the Tiger-Cats on March 6, 2025.

== Professional career statistics ==
=== NFL ===
Year	Team	Games		Receiving					Rushing					Fumbles	
Year	Team	GP	GS	Rec	Yds	Avg	Lng	TD	Att	Yds	Avg	Lng	TD	Fum	Lost
2020	IND	1	0	0	0	0.0	0	0	0	0	0.0	0	0	0	0
2021	IND	8	0	2	21	10.5	14	1	0	0	0.0	0	0	0	0
2022	IND	1	0	2	24	12.0	17	0	0	0	0.0	0	0	0	0
Career		10	0	4	45	11.3	17	1	0	0	0.0	0	0	0	0

=== CFL ===
Year	Team	Games		Receiving					Rushing					Fumbles	
Year	Team	GP	GS	Rec	Yds	Avg	Lng	TD	Att	Yds	Avg	Lng	TD	Fum	Lost
2024	HAM	7	3	13	156	12	22	0	0	0	0.0	0	0	0	0
Total		7	3	13	156	12	22	0	0	0	0	0	0	0	0

== Personal life ==
Patmon was named after former Michigan Wolverines wide receiver Desmond Howard. His uncle DeWayne Patmon played linebacker at Michigan followed by the New York Giants in 2000–01.
