= 2019 Arizona State Sun Devils football team =

American college football season

2019 Arizona State Sun Devils football

Sun Bowl champion

Sun Bowl, W 20–14 vs. Florida State
- Conference: Pac-12 Conference
- South Division
- Record: 8–5 (4–5 Pac-12)
- Head coach: Herm Edwards (2nd season)
- Offensive coordinator: Rob Likens (2nd season)
- Offensive scheme: Spread
- Defensive coordinator: Danny Gonzales (2nd season)
- Base defense: 3–3–5
- Captains: Cohl Cabral; Eno Benjamin; Kobe Williams; Darien Butler; Ethan Long
- Home stadium: Sun Devil Stadium

Uniform
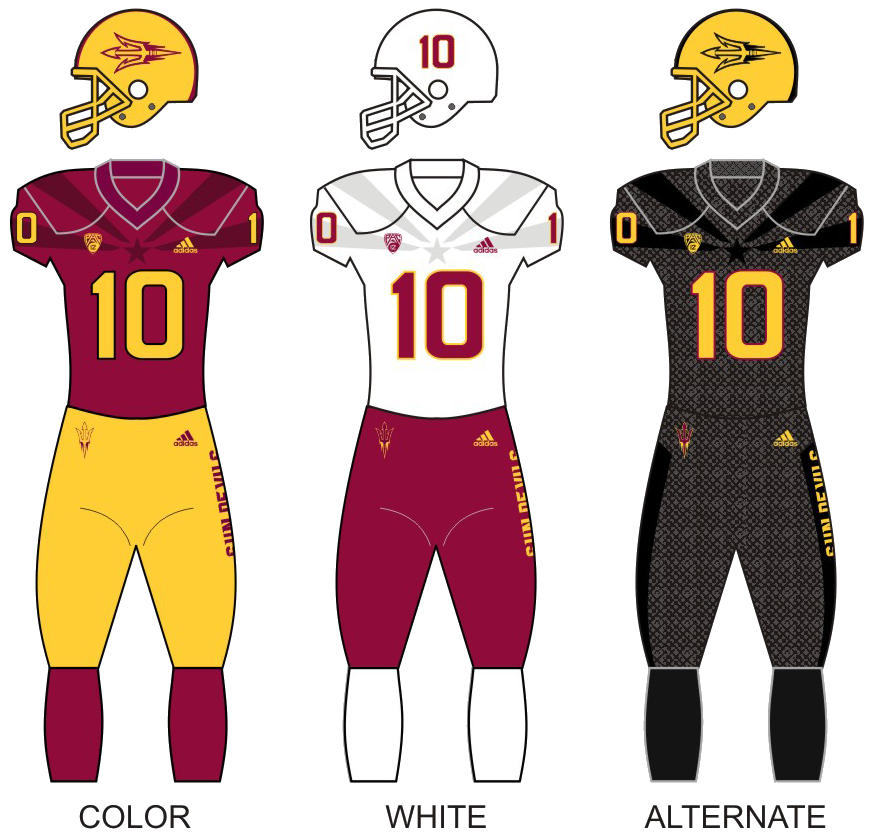

2019 Pac-12 Conference football standings
	Conf.			Overall
Team	W		L	W		L
North Division
No. 5 Oregon xy$	8	–	1	12	–	2
California	4	–	5	8	–	5
Washington	4	–	5	8	–	5
Oregon State	4	–	5	5	–	7
Washington State	3	–	6	6	–	7
Stanford	3	–	6	4	–	8
South Division
No. 16 Utah xy	8	–	1	11	–	3
USC	7	–	2	8	–	5
Arizona State	4	–	5	8	–	5
UCLA	4	–	5	4	–	8
Colorado	3	–	6	5	–	7
Arizona	2	–	7	4	–	8
Championship: Oregon 37, Utah 15
$ – Conference champion; x – Division champion/co-champions; y – Championship game participant; Rankings from AP Poll

The 2019 Arizona State Sun Devils football team represented Arizona State University in the 2019 NCAA Division I FBS football season. They were led by second-year head coach Herm Edwards and played their home games at Sun Devil Stadium. Quarterback Jayden Daniels set the school's freshman passing yards record with 2,943.

== Preseason ==
In the 2019 Pac-12 preseason media poll, Arizona State was voted to finish tied for third place with UCLA in the South Division.

== Offseason ==
=== Recruiting ===
College recruiting information
Name	Hometown	School	Height	Weight	Commit date
Jayden Daniels; QB	San Bernardino, CA	Cajon HS	6 ft 3 in (1.91 m)	175 lb (79 kg)	Dec 13, 2018
Jayden Daniels; QB	Recruit ratings: Rivals: 247Sports: ESPN: (86)				
Stephon Wright; DE	Los Angeles, CA	Cathedral HS	6 ft 3 in (1.91 m)	260 lb (120 kg)	Dec 19, 2018
Stephon Wright; DE	Recruit ratings: Rivals: 247Sports: ESPN: (80)				
Joey Yellen; QB	Mission Viejo, CA	Mission Viejo HS	6 ft 2 in (1.88 m)	211 lb (96 kg)	Jun 10, 2018
Joey Yellen; QB	Recruit ratings: Rivals: 247Sports: ESPN: (85)				
Kejuan Markham; S	Long Beach, CA	Long Beach Poly HS	6 ft 1 in (1.85 m)	180 lb (82 kg)	Nov 30, 2018
Kejuan Markham; S	Recruit ratings: Rivals: 247Sports: ESPN: (80)				
Jordan Clark; CB	Baton Rouge, LA	University Lab HS	5 ft 11 in (1.80 m)	168 lb (76 kg)	Oct 16, 2018
Jordan Clark; CB	Recruit ratings: Rivals: 247Sports: ESPN: (80)				
Keon Markham; CB	Long Beach, CA	Long Beach Poly HS	6 ft 0 in (1.83 m)	175 lb (79 kg)	Nov 30, 2018
Keon Markham; CB	Recruit ratings: Rivals: 247Sports: ESPN: (80)				
Ethan Long; QB	West Linn, OR	West Linn HS	6 ft 2 in (1.88 m)	212 lb (96 kg)	Jun 4, 2018
Ethan Long; QB	Recruit ratings: Rivals: 247Sports: ESPN: (83)				
Nolan Matthews; TE	Frisco, TX	Reedy HS	6 ft 3 in (1.91 m)	242 lb (110 kg)	Jul 4, 2018
Nolan Matthews; TE	Recruit ratings: Rivals: 247Sports: ESPN: (79)				
Dohnovan West; OC	Mission Hills CA	Bishop Alemany HS	6 ft 3 in (1.91 m)	290 lb (130 kg)	Nov 3, 2018
Dohnovan West; OC	Recruit ratings: Rivals: 247Sports: ESPN: (77)				
LaDarius Henderson; OT	Waxahachie, TX	Waxahachie HS	6 ft 4 in (1.93 m)	270 lb (120 kg)	Jun 21, 2018
LaDarius Henderson; OT	Recruit ratings: Rivals: 247Sports: ESPN: (78)				
Connor Soelle; ATH	Scottsdale, AZ	Saguaro High School	6 ft 1 in (1.85 m)	195 lb (88 kg)	Jun 24, 2018
Connor Soelle; ATH	Recruit ratings: Rivals: 247Sports: ESPN: (76)				
Amiri Johnson; DE	Pomona, CA	Diamond Ranch HS	6 ft 6 in (1.98 m)	235 lb (107 kg)	Dec 6, 2018
Amiri Johnson; DE	Recruit ratings: Rivals: 247Sports: ESPN: (78)				
Willie Harts; CB	Pittsburg, CA	Pittsburg, HS	6 ft 0 in (1.83 m)	170 lb (77 kg)	Dec 4, 2018
Willie Harts; CB	Recruit ratings: Rivals: 247Sports: ESPN: (76)				
Jordan Kerley; WR	Austin, TX	McNeil HS	6 ft 1 in (1.85 m)	190 lb (86 kg)	Jul 4, 2018
Jordan Kerley; WR	Recruit ratings: Rivals: 247Sports: ESPN: (77)				
Ricky Pearsall; WR	Tempe, AZ	Corona Del Sol HS	6 ft 1 in (1.85 m)	195 lb (88 kg)	Jun 18, 2018
Ricky Pearsall; WR	Recruit ratings: Rivals: 247Sports: ESPN: (77)				
Anthonie Cooper; DE	Goodyear, AZ	Millennium HS	6 ft 3 in (1.91 m)	275 lb (125 kg)	Sep 11, 2018
Anthonie Cooper; DE	Recruit ratings: Rivals: 247Sports: ESPN: (79)				
Roman DeWys; OT	Chandler, AZ	Basha HS	6 ft 5 in (1.96 m)	280 lb (130 kg)	Jun 11, 2018
Roman DeWys; OT	Recruit ratings: Rivals: 247Sports: ESPN: (77)				
Andre Johnson; WR	Tolleson, AZ	Tolleson Union HS	6 ft 3 in (1.91 m)	185 lb (84 kg)	Jun 25, 2018
Andre Johnson; WR	Recruit ratings: Rivals: 247Sports: ESPN: (75)				
Alijah Bates; OT	Colorado Springs, CO	Doherty HS	6 ft 8 in (2.03 m)	235 lb (107 kg)	Sep 20, 2018
Alijah Bates; OT	Recruit ratings: Rivals: 247Sports: ESPN: (75)				
Ben Scott; OT	Honolulu, HI	St. Louis HS	6 ft 5 in (1.96 m)	290 lb (130 kg)	Aug 22, 2018
Ben Scott; OT	Recruit ratings: Rivals: 247Sports: ESPN: (71)				
Elijah Juarez; LB	Long Beach, CA	Long Beach Poly HS	6 ft 2 in (1.88 m)	215 lb (98 kg)	Feb 6, 2019
Elijah Juarez; LB	Recruit ratings: Rivals: 247Sports: ESPN: (NR)				
Overall recruit ranking:
‡ Refers to 40-yard dash; Note: In many cases, Scout, Rivals, 247Sports, On3, and ESPN may conflict in their listings of height, weight and 40 time.; In these cases, the average was taken. ESPN grades are on a 100-point scale.; Sources: "Arizona State Football Commitment List". Rivals.; "2019 Player Commitments – Arizona". ESPN.; "2019 Team Ranking". Rivals.com.; "2019 Arizona State Sun Devils football team". 247Sports.

=== Transfers ===
Outgoing

Name	No.	Pos.	Height	Weight	Year	Hometown	New school
Jay Jay Wilson	#9	TE	6'3"	250	Graduate Transfer	Valencia, CA	Auburn Tigers
Terrell Chatman	#19	WR	6'3"	190	Senior	Baton Rouge, LA	Virginia Cavaliers
Reggie Hughes	#52	LB	6'2"	208	Sophomore	Calabasas, CA	N/A
Dominique Harrison	#7	CB	6'0"	185	Senior	Humble, TX	North Texas Mean Green
Jalen Bates	#96	DE	6'4"	245	RS-Junior	Kaplan, LA	Colorado State Rams
Trelon Smith	#20	RB	5'8"	181	Freshman	Houston, TX	Arkansas Razorbacks
Malik Lawal	#39	LB	6'1"	220	RS-Senior	Temecula, CA	Tulane Green Wave
Ceejhay French-Love	#88	TE	6'5"	255	Graduate Transfer	Monterey Park, CA	NAU Lumberjacks
Darius Slade	#2	DL	6'4"	255	RS-Senior	Montclair, NJ	South Florida Bulls
Nick Ralston	#22	FB	6'1"	240	RS-Senior	Argyle, TX	Louisiana Ragin' Cajuns
Michael Sleep-Dalton	#36	P	6'2"	210	RS-Senior	San Francisco, CA	Iowa Hawkeyes
Joey Bryant	#37	CB	6'1"	180	Graduate Transfer	Honolulu, HI	Memphis Tigers

Incoming

Name	No.	Pos.	Height	Weight	Year	Hometown	Prev. school
Timarcus Davis	#6	DB	6'0"	177	2019	College Station, TX	Baylor
Jack Jones	#21	DB	5'11"	170	2020	Long Beach, CA	USC
Devin Neal	#35	WR	6'0"	171	2019	Eloy, AZ	Scottsdale CC
T. J. Pesefea	#44	DL	6'5"	313	2019	Sacramento, CA	American River
Vincenzo Granatelli	#48	DB	6'4"	184	2019	Moorpark, CA	Southern Nazarene
Cody Shear	#56	OG	6'4"	285	2020	Eugene, OR	Oregon Ducks
Grant Miles	#80	TE	6'4"	245	2020	Scottsdale, AZ	New Mexico State Aggies
Brandon Pierce	#85	WR	5'11"	175	2019	Mission Hills, CA	Canyons
Roe Wilkins	#95	DL	6'3"	260	2019	Sour Lake, TX	Rice Owls

=== 2019 NFL draft ===
==== ASU players drafted into the NFL ====
Player	Position	Round	Pick	NFL team
N'Keal Harry	Wide receiver	1	32	New England Patriots
Renell Wren	Defensive lineman	4	125	Cincinnati Bengals

==== Undrafted NFL free agents ====
Player	Position	NFL team
Manny Wilkins	Quarterback	Green Bay Packers
Quinn Bailey	Offensive lineman	Denver Broncos
Casey Tucker	Offensive lineman	Philadelphia Eagles

== Schedule ==
Arizona State opened its 2019 schedule with three non-conference games against Kent State of the Mid-American Conference, Sacramento State of the Big Sky Conference, and Michigan State of the Big Ten Conference. In Pac-12 Conference play, the Sun Devils would play the other members of the South Division and drew California, Oregon, Oregon State, and Washington State from the North Division.

Date	Time	Opponent	Rank	Site	TV	Result	Attendance
August 29	7:00 p.m.	Kent State*		Sun Devil Stadium; Tempe, AZ	P12N	W 30–7	47,413
September 6	7:00 p.m.	Sacramento State*		Sun Devil Stadium; Tempe, AZ	P12N	W 19–7	42,286
September 14	1:00 p.m.	at No. 18 Michigan State*		Spartan Stadium; East Lansing, MI	FOX	W 10–7	73,531
September 21	7:00 p.m.	Colorado	No. 24	Sun Devil Stadium; Tempe, AZ	P12N	L 31–34	45,786
September 27	7:30 p.m.	at No. 15 California		California Memorial Stadium; Berkeley, CA	ESPN	W 24–17	47,532
October 12	12:30 p.m.	Washington State	No. 18	Sun Devil Stadium; Tempe, AZ	P12N	W 38–34	48,536
October 19	3:00 p.m.	at No. 13 Utah	No. 17	Rice–Eccles Stadium; Salt Lake City, UT	P12N	L 3–21	46,402
October 26	4:30 p.m.	at UCLA	No. 24	Rose Bowl; Pasadena, CA	P12N	L 32–42	39,811
November 9	1:30 p.m.	USC		Sun Devil Stadium; Tempe, AZ	ABC	L 26–31	54,191
November 16	5:30 p.m.	at Oregon State		Reser Stadium; Corvallis, OR	FS1	L 34–35	30,980
November 23	5:30 p.m.	No. 6 Oregon^{†}		Sun Devil Stadium; Tempe, AZ	ABC	W 31–28	51,875
November 30	8:00 p.m.	Arizona		Sun Devil Stadium; Tempe, AZ (Territorial Cup)	ESPN	W 24–14	54,074
December 31	12:00 p.m.	vs. Florida State*		Sun Bowl; El Paso, TX (Sun Bowl)	CBS	W 20–14	42,212
*Non-conference game; ^{†}Homecoming; Rankings from AP Poll released prior to the game; All times are in Mountain time

== Game summaries ==
=== vs Kent State ===
Kent State Golden Flashes (0–0) at Arizona State Sun Devils (0–0) – Game summary

Quarter	1	2	3	4	Total
Golden Flashes	0	0	0	7	7
Sun Devils	10	0	17	3	30

at Sun Devil Stadium • Tempe, AZ

- Date: August 29, 2019
- Game time: 7:00 p.m.
- Game weather: Partly cloudy, 102 °F (39 °C)
- Game attendance: 47,413
- Referee: Steve Strimling
- TV announcers (Pac-12 Network): Roxy Bernstein (play-by-play), Anthony Herron (analyst), Jill Savage (sideline reporter)

Game information

First quarter

- (10:26) ASU – Cristian Zendejas 35-yard field goal (Drive: 7 plays, 41 yards, 3:04; Arizona State 3–0)
- (3:57) ASU – Eno Benjamin 8-yard pass from Jayden Daniels, Cristian Zendejas kick (Drive: 5 plays, 34 yards, 2:19; Arizona State 10–0)

Second quarter

- No scoring plays

Third quarter

- (11:17) ASU – Jayden Daniels 1-yard run, Cristian Zendejas kick (Drive: 9 plays, 70 yards, 3:41; Arizona State 17–0)
- (9:38) ASU – Cristian Zendejas 31-yard field goal (Drive: 4 plays, 5 yards, 0:53; Arizona State 20–0)
- (3:53) ASU – Brandon Aiyuk 77-yard pass from Jayden Daniels, Cristian Zendejas kick (Drive: 5 plays, 86 yards, 2:36; Arizona State 27–0)

Fourth quarter

- (12:29) KENT – Isaiah McKoy 21-yard pass from Woody Barrett, Matthew Trickett kick (Drive: 8 plays, 69 yards, 2:58; Arizona State 27–7)
- (8:03) ASU – Cristian Zendejas 40-yard field goal (Drive: 9 plays, 53 yards, 4:26; Arizona State 30–7)

Statistics	KENT	ASU
First downs	11	18
Total yards	200	455
Rushing yards	40–120	46–171
Passing yards	80	284
Passing: Comp–Att–Int	12–24–0	15–24–0
Time of possession	25:37	34:23

Team	Category	Player	Statistics
Kent State	Passing	Woody Barrett	9/16, 83 yards, TD
Kent State	Rushing	Jo-El Shaw	16 carries, 67 yards
Kent State	Receiving	Antwan Dixon	4 receptions, 44 yards
Arizona State	Passing	Jayden Daniels	15/24, 284 yards, 2 TD
Arizona State	Rushing	Eno Benjamin	22 carries, 102 yards
Arizona State	Receiving	Brandon Aiyuk	4 receptions, 140 yards, TD

=== vs Sacramento State ===
Sacramento State Hornets (1–0) at Arizona State Sun Devils (1–0) – Game summary

Quarter	1	2	3	4	Total
Hornets	0	0	0	7	7
Sun Devils	0	3	6	10	19

at Sun Devil Stadium • Tempe, AZ

- Date: September 6, 2019
- Game time: 7:00 p.m.
- Game weather: Partly cloudy, 104 °F (40 °C)
- Game attendance: 42,286
- Referee: Jay Edwards
- TV announcers (Pac-12 Network): Guy Haberman (play-by-play), Lincoln Kennedy (analyst), Cindy Brunson (sideline reporter)

Game information

First quarter

- No scoring plays

Second quarter

- (1:57) ASU – Cristian Zendejas 36-yard field goal (Drive: 9 plays, 15 yards, 3:42; Arizona State 3–0)

Third quarter

- (9:15) ASU – Cristian Zendejas 26-yard field goal (Drive: 9 plays, 53 yards, 3:43; Arizona State 6–0)
- (4:57) ASU – Cristian Zendejas 35-yard field goal (Drive: 8 plays, 64 yards, 2:51; Arizona State 9–0)

Fourth quarter

- (14:55) ASU – Cristian Zendejas 26-yard field goal (Drive: 7 plays, 60 yards, 3:02; Arizona State 12–0)
- (6:20) SAC – Tao McClinton 9-yard pass from Kevin Thomson, Devon Medeiros kick (Drive: 7 plays, 72 yards, 2:42; Arizona State 12–7)
- (4:42) ASU – Eno Benjamin 72-yard pass from Jayden Daniels, Cristian Zendejas kick (Drive: 3 plays, 75 yards, 1:38; Arizona State 19–0)

Statistics	SAC	ASU
First downs	16	15
Total yards	305	395
Rushing yards	23–42	39–91
Passing yards	263	304
Passing: Comp–Att–Int	32–50–1	17–27–0
Time of possession	30:53	29:07

Team	Category	Player	Statistics
Sacramento State	Passing	Kevin Thomson	32/50, 263 yards, TD, INT
Sacramento State	Rushing	Elijah Dotson	11 carries, 32 yards
Sacramento State	Receiving	Pierre Williams	6 receptions, 72 yards
Arizona State	Passing	Jayden Daniels	17/27, 304 yards, TD
Arizona State	Rushing	Eno Benjamin	24 carries, 69 yards
Arizona State	Receiving	Brandon Aiyuk	4 receptions, 98 yards

=== at No. 18 Michigan State ===
Arizona State Sun Devils (2–0) at No. 18 Michigan State Spartans (2–0) – Game summary

Quarter	1	2	3	4	Total
Sun Devils	0	3	0	7	10
No. 18 Spartans	0	0	0	7	7

at Spartan Stadium • East Lansing, MI

- Date: September 14, 2019
- Game time: 1:00 p.m.
- Game weather: Mostly sunny, 75 °F (24 °C)
- Game attendance: 73,531
- Referee: Mark Duddy
- TV announcers (Fox): Tim Brando (play-by-play), Spencer Tillman (analyst), Coley Harvey (sideline reporter)

Game information

First quarter

- No scoring plays

Second quarter

- (3:40) ASU – Cristian Zendejas 41-yard field goal (Drive: 10 plays, 48 yards, 5:38; Arizona State 3–0)

Third quarter

- No scoring plays

Fourth quarter

- (8:37) MSU – Elijah Collins 9-yard run, Kyle Ferrie kick (Drive: 10 plays, 70 yards, 5:31; Michigan State 7–3)
- (0:50) ASU – Eno Benjamin 1-yard run, Cristian Zendejas kick (Drive: 11 plays, 75 yards, 2:44; Arizona State 10–7)

Statistics	ASU	MSU
First downs	14	23
Total yards	216	404
Rushing yards	26–76	35–113
Passing yards	140	291
Passing: Comp–Att–Int	15–26–0	24–39–0
Time of possession	26:17	33:43

Team	Category	Player	Statistics
Arizona State	Passing	Jayden Daniels	15/26, 140 yards
Arizona State	Rushing	Eno Benjamin	11 carries, 38 yards, TD
Arizona State	Receiving	Brandon Aiyuk	5 receptions, 64 yards
Michigan State	Passing	Brian Lewerke	24/38, 291 yards
Michigan State	Rushing	Elijah Collins	19 carries, 72 yards, TD
Michigan State	Receiving	Darrell Stewart Jr.	9 receptions, 121 yards

=== vs Colorado ===
Colorado Buffaloes (2–1) at No. 24 Arizona State Sun Devils (3–0) – Game summary

Quarter	1	2	3	4	Total
Buffaloes	14	10	7	3	34
No. 24 Sun Devils	0	21	3	7	31

at Sun Devil Stadium • Tempe, AZ

- Date: September 21, 2019
- Game time: 7:00 p.m.
- Game weather: Relatively clear, 91 °F (33 °C)
- Game attendance: 45,786
- Referee: Kevin Mar
- TV announcers (Pac-12 Network): Ted Robinson (play-by-play), Yogi Roth (analyst), Jill Savage (sideline reporter)

Game information

First quarter

- (10:00) COLO – Alex Fontenot 1-yard run, James Stefanou kick (Drive: 10 plays, 75 yards, 5:00; Colorado 7–0)
- (1:18) COLO – Tony Brown 29-yard pass from Steven Montez, James Stefanou kick (Drive: 11 plays, 70 yards, 5:06; Colorado 14–0)

Second quarter

- (13:09) ASU – Brandon Aiyuk 53-yard pass from Jayden Daniels, Cristian Zendejas kick (Drive: 8 plays, 76 yards, 3:09; Colorado 14–7)
- (10:41) ASU – Eno Benjamin 1-yard run, Cristian Zendejas kick (Drive: 7 plays, 44 yards, 2:22; Tied 14–14)
- (8:45) COLO – Tony Brown 31-yard pass from Steven Montez, James Stefanou kick (Drive: 6 plays, 61 yards, 1:47; Colorado 21–14)
- (5:23) ASU – Eno Benjamin 3-yard run, Cristian Zendejas kick (Drive: 10 plays, 75 yards, 3:22; Tied 21–21)
- (0:28) COLO – James Stefanou 25-yard field goal (Drive: 12 plays, 63 yards, 4:46; Colorado 24–21)

Third quarter

- (3:42) ASU – Cristian Zendejas 23-yard field goal (Drive: 14 plays, 81 yards, 7:20; Tied 24–24)
- (1:10) COLO – Tony Brown 20-yard pass from Steven Montez, James Stefanou kick (Drive: 5 plays, 65 yards, 2:32; Colorado 31–24)

Fourth quarter

- (13:51) ASU – Frank Darby 39-yard pass from Jayden Daniels, Cristian Zendejas kick (Drive: 5 plays, 65 yards, 2:13; Tied 31–31)
- (2:03) COLO – James Stefanou 44-yard field goal (Drive: 11 plays, 57 yards, 4:47; Colorado 34–31)

Statistics	COLO	ASU
First downs	20	21
Total yards	475	453
Rushing yards	40–138	28–108
Passing yards	337	345
Passing: Comp–Att–Int	23–30–0	24–39–1
Time of possession	31:56	28:04

Team	Category	Player	Statistics
Colorado	Passing	Steven Montez	23/30, 337 yards, 3 TD
Colorado	Rushing	Alex Fontenot	25 carries, 89 yards, TD
Colorado	Receiving	Tony Brown	9 receptions, 150 yards, 3 TD
Arizona State	Passing	Jayden Daniels	24/39, 345 yards, 2 TD, INT
Arizona State	Rushing	Eno Benjamin	20 carries, 83 yards, 2 TD
Arizona State	Receiving	Brandon Aiyuk	9 receptions, 122 yards, TD

=== at No. 15 California ===
Arizona State Sun Devils (3–1) at No. 15 California Golden Bears (4–0) – Game summary

Quarter	1	2	3	4	Total
Sun Devils	7	0	7	10	24
No. 15 Golden Bears	7	0	7	3	17

at Memorial Stadium • Berkeley, CA

- Date: September 27, 2019
- Game time: 7:30 p.m.
- Game weather: Low clouds, 55 °F (13 °C)
- Game attendance: 47,532
- Referee: Michael Mothershed
- TV announcers (ESPN): Dave Flemming (play-by-play), Louis Riddick (analyst), Paul Carcaterra (sideline reporter)

Game information

First quarter

- (8:22) ASU – Eno Benjamin 11-yard run, Cristian Zendejas kick (Drive: 8 plays, 80 yards, 2:48; Arizona State 7–0)
- (5:35) CAL – Trevon Clark 16-yard pass from Chase Garbers, Greg Thomas kick (Drive: 6 plays, 75 yards, 2:47; Tied 7–7)

Second quarter

- No scoring plays

Third quarter

- (9:16) CAL – Christopher Brown Jr. 1-yard run, Greg Thomas kick (Drive: 12 plays, 63 yards, 5:37; California 14–7)
- (6:01) ASU – Eno Benjamin 4-yard run, Cristian Zendejas kick (Drive: 7 plays, 50 yards, 3:07; Tied 14–14)

Fourth quarter

- (10:50) CAL – Greg Thomas 47-yard field goal (Drive: 4 plays, 0 yards, 1:08; California 17–14)
- (4:41) ASU – Eno Benjamin 3-yard run, Cristian Zendejas kick (Drive: 15 plays, 75 yards, 6:09; Arizona State 21–17)
- (2:53) ASU – Cristian Zendejas 43-yard field goal (Drive: 4 plays, 4 yards, 0:23; Arizona State 24–17)

Statistics	ASU	CAL
First downs	19	13
Total yards	365	245
Rushing yards	48–191	37–105
Passing yards	174	140
Passing: Comp–Att–Int	14–24–0	14–26–1
Time of possession	32:55	27:05

Team	Category	Player	Statistics
Arizona State	Passing	Jayden Daniels	14/24, 174 yards
Arizona State	Rushing	Eno Benjamin	29 carries, 100 yards, 3 TD
Arizona State	Receiving	Ricky Pearsall	1 reception, 38 yards
California	Passing	Chase Garbers	9/12, 117 yards, TD
California	Rushing	Christopher Brown Jr.	18 carries, 54 yards, TD
California	Receiving	Trevon Clark	4 receptions, 68 yards, TD

=== vs Washington State ===
Washington State Cougars (3–2) at No. 18 Arizona State Sun Devils (4–1) – Game summary

Quarter	1	2	3	4	Total
Cougars	10	7	14	3	34
No. 18 Sun Devils	0	17	7	14	38

at Sun Devil Stadium • Tempe, AZ

- Date: October 12, 2019
- Game time: 12:30 p.m.
- Game weather: Clear skies, 85 °F (29 °C)
- Game attendance: 48,536
- Referee: Chris Coyte
- TV announcers (Pac-12 Network): Ted Robinson (play-by-play), Yogi Roth (analyst), Lewis Johnson (sideline reporter)

Game information

First quarter

- (12:36) WSU – Travell Harris 35-yard pass from Anthony Gordon, Blake Mazza kick (Drive: 5 plays, 66 yards, 2:24; Washington State 7–0)
- (5:19) WSU – Blake Mazza 33-yard field goal (Drive: 13 plays, 69 yards, 4:42; Washington State 10–0)

Second quarter

- (11:50) ASU – Brandon Aiyuk 40-yard pass from Jayden Daniels, Cristian Zendejas kick (Drive: 8 plays, 73 yards, 4:19; Washington State 10–7)
- (8:15) WSU – Dezmon Patmon 2-yard pass from Anthony Gordon, Blake Mazza kick (Drive: 7 plays, 87 yards, 3:30; Washington State 17–7)
- (1:55) ASU – Brandon Aiyuk 86-yard pass from Jayden Daniels, Cristian Zendejas kick (Drive: 2 plays, 87 yards, 0:49; Washington State 17–14)
- (0:00) ASU – Cristian Zendejas 31-yard field goal (Drive: 8 plays, 62 yards, 1:29; Tied 17–17)

Third quarter

- (10:38) ASU – Eno Benjamin 32-yard run, Cristian Zendejas kick (Drive: 9 plays, 75 yards, 4:22; Arizona State 24–17)
- (5:35) WSU – Easop Winston 2-yard pass from Anthony Gordon, Blake Mazza kick (Drive: 14 plays, 91 yards, 4:58; Tied 24–24)
- (0:10) WSU – Max Borghi 2-yard run, Blake Mazza kick (Drive: 9 plays, 92 yards, 3:42; Washington State 31–24)

Fourth quarter

- (11:19) ASU – Brandon Aiyuk 33-yard pass from Jayden Daniels, Cristian Zendejas kick (Drive: 9 plays, 84 yards, 3:43; Tied 31–31)
- (2:30) WSU – Blake Mazza 31-yard field goal (Drive: 5 plays, 22 yards, 2:57; Washington State 34–31)
- (0:34) ASU – Jayden Daniels 17-yard run, Cristian Zendejas kick (Drive: 10 plays, 75 yards, 1:56; Arizona State 38–34)

Statistics	WSU	ASU
First downs	29	25
Total yards	498	532
Rushing yards	10–32	32–169
Passing yards	466	363
Passing: Comp–Att–Int	44–66–0	26–36–0
Time of possession	30:59	29:01

Team	Category	Player	Statistics
Washington State	Passing	Anthony Gordon	44/64, 466 yards, 3 TD
Washington State	Rushing	Max Borghi	9 carries, 31 yards, TD
Washington State	Receiving	Easop Winston	14 receptions, 118 yards, TD
Arizona State	Passing	Jayden Daniels	26/36, 363 yards, 3 TD
Arizona State	Rushing	Eno Benjamin	19 carries, 137 yards, TD
Arizona State	Receiving	Brandon Aiyuk	7 receptions, 196 yards, 3 TD

=== at No. 13 Utah ===
No. 17 Arizona State Sun Devils (5–1) at No. 13 Utah Utes (5–1) – Game summary

Quarter	1	2	3	4	Total
No. 17 Sun Devils	0	0	3	0	3
No. 13 Utes	0	14	0	7	21

at Rice-Eccles Stadium • Salt Lake City, UT

- Date: October 19, 2019
- Game time: 3:00 p.m.
- Game weather: Rain, 46 °F (8 °C)
- Game attendance: 46,402
- Referee: Mark Duddy
- TV announcers (Pac-12 Network): Ted Robinson (play-by-play), Yogi Roth (analyst), Lewis Johnson (sideline reporter)

Game information

First quarter

- No scoring plays

Second quarter

- (8:59) UTAH – Jaylen Dixon 10-yard run, Jadon Redding kick (Drive: 7 plays, 60 yards, 3:28; Utah 7–0)
- (1:08) UTAH – Zack Moss 1-yard run, Jadon Redding kick (Drive: 12 plays, 73 yards, 5:39; Utah 14–0)

Third quarter

- (6:50) ASU – Cristian Zendejas 40-yard field goal (Drive: 4 plays, -4 yards, 2:08; Utah 14–3)

Fourth quarter

- (5:24) UTAH – Zack Moss 32-yard run, Jadon Redding kick (Drive: 1 play, 32 yards, 0:09; Utah 21–3)

Statistics	ASU	UTAH
First downs	8	20
Total yards	136	342
Rushing yards	33–111	43–151
Passing yards	25	191
Passing: Comp–Att–Int	4–18–1	14–24–1
Time of possession	24:42	35:18

Team	Category	Player	Statistics
Arizona State	Passing	Jayden Daniels	14/18, 25 yards, INT
Arizona State	Rushing	Eno Benjamin	15 carries, 104 yards
Arizona State	Receiving	Frank Darby	1 reception, 12 yards
Utah	Passing	Tyler Huntley	12/19, 171 yards, INT
Utah	Rushing	Zack Moss	25 carries, 99 yards, 2 TD
Utah	Receiving	Zack Moss	3 receptions, 78 yards

=== at UCLA ===
No. 24 Arizona State Sun Devils (5–2) at UCLA Bruins (2–5) – Game summary

Quarter	1	2	3	4	Total
No. 24 Sun Devils	7	0	3	22	32
Bruins	14	14	14	0	42

at Rose Bowl • Pasadena, CA

- Date: October 26, 2019
- Game time: 4:30 p.m.
- Game weather: Hot, clear, 87 °F (31 °C)
- Game attendance: 39,811
- Referee: Chris Coyte
- TV announcers (Pac-12 Network): Ted Robinson (play-by-play), Yogi Roth (analyst), Lewis Johnson (sideline reporter)

Game information

First quarter

- (10:53) UCLA – Joshua Kelley 1-yard run, JJ Molson kick (Drive: 5 plays, 42 yards, 2:10; UCLA 7–0)
- (7:36) ASU – Jayden Daniels 1-yard run, Cristian Zendejas kick (Drive: 3 plays, 4 yards, 0:55; Tied 7–7)
- (0:14) UCLA – Joshua Kelley 5-yard run, JJ Molson kick (Drive: 16 plays, 81 yards, 7:14; UCLA 14–7)

Second quarter

- (4:22) UCLA – Joshua Kelley 16-yard run, JJ Molson kick (Drive: 16 plays, 80 yards, 8:27; UCLA 21–7)
- (0:25) UCLA – Kyle Philips 20-yard pass from Dorian Thompson-Robinson, JJ Molson kick (Drive: 5 plays, 64 yards, 0:38; UCLA 28–7)

Third quarter

- (10:40) UCLA – Joshua Kelley 2-yard run, JJ Molson kick (Drive: 9 plays, 71 yards, 4:31; UCLA 35–7)
- (7:23) ASU – Cristian Zendejas 30-yard field goal (Drive: 8 plays, 67 yards, 3:13; UCLA 35–10)
- (0:46) UCLA – Devin Asiasi 8-yard pass from Dorian Thompson-Robinson, JJ Molson kick (Drive: 9 plays, 53 yards, 4:39; UCLA 42–10)

Fourth quarter

- (11:08) ASU – Frank Darby 12-yard pass from Jayden Daniels, Cristian Zendejas kick (Drive: 3 plays, 36 yards, 1:02; UCLA 42–17)
- (6:04) ASU – Nolan Matthews 4-yard pass from Jayden Daniels, Jayden Daniels run (Drive: 5 plays, 28 yards, 1:51; UCLA 42–25)
- (0:40) ASU – Frank Darby 27-yard pass from Jayden Daniels, Cristian Zendejas kick (Drive: 6 plays, 65 yards, 1:32; UCLA 42–32)

Statistics	ASU	UCLA
First downs	18	27
Total yards	383	393
Rushing yards	28–116	57–217
Passing yards	267	176
Passing: Comp–Att–Int	20–29–0	16–23–0
Time of possession	21:30	38:30

Team	Category	Player	Statistics
Arizona State	Passing	Jayden Daniels	20/29, 267 yards, 3 TD
Arizona State	Rushing	Jayden Daniels	13 carries, 67 yards, TD
Arizona State	Receiving	Frank Darby	6 receptions, 110 yards, 2 TD
UCLA	Passing	Dorian Thompson-Robinson	16/23, 176 yards, 2 TD
UCLA	Rushing	Joshua Kelley	34 carries, 164 yards, 4 TD
UCLA	Receiving	Ethan Fernea	3 receptions, 45 yards

=== vs USC ===
USC Trojans (5–4) at Arizona State Sun Devils (5–3) – Game summary

Quarter	1	2	3	4	Total
Trojans	28	0	3	0	31
Sun Devils	7	6	7	6	26

at Sun Devil Stadium • Tempe, AZ

- Date: November 9, 2019
- Game time: 1:30 p.m.
- Game weather: Mostly clear, 85 °F (29 °C)
- Game attendance: 54,191
- Referee: Mark Duddy
- TV announcers (ABC): Jason Benetti (play-by-play), Rod Gilmore (analyst), Quint Kessenich (sideline reporter)

Game information

First quarter

- (9:56) USC – Drake London 8-yard pass from Kedon Slovis, Chase McGrath kick (Drive: 11 plays, 75 yards, 5:04; USC 7–0)
- (6:14) USC – Kenan Christon 8-yard pass from Kedon Slovis, Chase McGrath kick (Drive: 6 plays, 82 yards, 2:35; USC 14–0)
- (5:12) ASU – Kyle Williams 5-yard pass from Joey Yellen, Cristian Zendejas kick (Drive: 3 plays, 3 yards, 0:47; USC 14–7)
- (2:36) USC – Kenan Christon 58-yard pass from Kedon Slovis, Chase McGrath kick (Drive: 6 plays, 75 yards, 2:36; USC 21–7)
- (0:03) USC – Amon-Ra St. Brown 95-yard pass from Kedon Slovis, Chase McGrath kick (Drive: 3 plays, 98 yards, 0:51; USC 28–7)

Second quarter

- (6:47) ASU – Frank Darby 62-yard pass from Joey Yellen, kick failed (Drive: 3 plays, 71 yards, 1:00; USC 28–13)

Third quarter

- (11:32) ASU – Brandon Aiyuk 2-yard pass from Joey Yellen, Cristian Zendejas kick (Drive: 7 plays, 57 yards, 3:24; USC 28–20)
- (1:18) USC – Chase McGrath 41-yard field goal (Drive: 12 plays, 71 yards, 5:52; USC 31–20)

Fourth quarter

- (8:54) ASU – Frank Darby 15-yard pass from Joey Yellen, two-point pass failed (Drive: 6 plays, 40 yards, 3:05; USC 31–26)

Statistics	USC	ASU
First downs	23	18
Total yards	547	339
Rushing yards	28–70	21–47
Passing yards	477	292
Passing: Comp–Att–Int	33–45–1	28–44–2
Time of possession	31:34	28:26

Team	Category	Player	Statistics
USC	Passing	Kedon Slovis	29/39, 432 yards, 4 TD, INT
USC	Rushing	Kenan Christon	20 carries, 62 yards
USC	Receiving	Amon-Ra St. Brown	8 receptions, 173 yards, TD
Arizona State	Passing	Joey Yellen	28/44, 292 yards, 4 TD, 2 INT
Arizona State	Rushing	Eno Benjamin	20 carries, 52 yards
Arizona State	Receiving	Frank Darby	3 receptions, 86 yards, 2 TD

=== at Oregon State ===
Arizona State Sun Devils (5–4) at Oregon State Beavers (4–5) – Game summary

Quarter	1	2	3	4	Total
Sun Devils	14	7	7	6	34
Beavers	14	14	7	0	35

at Reser Stadium • Corvallis, OR

- Date: November 16, 2019
- Game time: 5:30 p.m.
- Game weather: Cloudy, 54 °F (12 °C)
- Game attendance: 30,980
- Referee: Francisco Villar
- TV announcers (FS1): Aaron Goldsmith (play-by-play), Jordan Palmer (analyst)

Game information

First quarter

- (11:40) OSU – Jesiah Irish 24-yard pass from Jake Luton, Everett Hayes kick (Drive: 8 plays, 80 yards, 3:20; Oregon State 7–0)
- (5:35) ASU – Eno Benjamin 2-yard run, Cristian Zendejas kick (Drive: 8 plays, 54 yards, 2:31; Tied 7–7)
- (2:00) OSU – Trevon Bradford 5-yard pass from Jake Luton, Everett Hayes kick (Drive: 9 plays, 74 yards, 3:29; Oregon State 14–7)
- (0:20) ASU – Frank Darby 24-yard pass from Jayden Daniels, Cristian Zendejas kick (Drive: 4 plays, 56 yards, 1:32; Tied 14–14)

Second quarter

- (9:58) OSU – Isaiah Hodgins 5-yard pass from Jake Luton, Everett Hayes kick (Drive: 10 plays, 74 yards, 5:15; Oregon State 21–14)
- (4:01) ASU – Brandon Aiyuk 63-yard punt return, Cristian Zendejas kick (Tied 21–21)
- (0:33) OSU – Jermar Jefferson 4-yard run, Everett Hayes kick (Drive: 8 plays, 72 yards, 3:22; Oregon State 28–21)

Third quarter

- (4:14) OSU – Noah Togiai 12-yard pass from Jake Luton, Everett Hayes kick (Drive: 5 plays, 28 yards, 2:40; Oregon State 35–21)
- (2:19) ASU – Kyle Williams 8-yard pass from Jayden Daniels, Cristian Zendejas kick (Drive: 6 plays, 82 yards, 1:49; Oregon State 35–28)

Fourth quarter

- (1:40) ASU – Brandon Aiyuk 12-yard pass from Jayden Daniels, two-point pass failed (Drive: 11 plays, 90 yards, 4:39; Oregon State 35–34)

Statistics	ASU	OSU
First downs	19	26
Total yards	408	393
Rushing yards	25–74	39–105
Passing yards	334	288
Passing: Comp–Att–Int	24–36–0	26–35–0
Time of possession	25:14	34:46

Team	Category	Player	Statistics
Arizona State	Passing	Jayden Daniels	24/36, 334 yards, 3 TD
Arizona State	Rushing	Eno Benjamin	15 carries, 70 yards, TD
Arizona State	Receiving	Brandon Aiyuk	10 receptions, 173 yards, TD
Oregon State	Passing	Jake Luton	26/35, 288 yards, 4 TD
Oregon State	Rushing	Artavis Pierce	16 carries, 63 yards
Oregon State	Receiving	Isaiah Hodgins	6 receptions, 93 yards, TD

=== vs Oregon ===
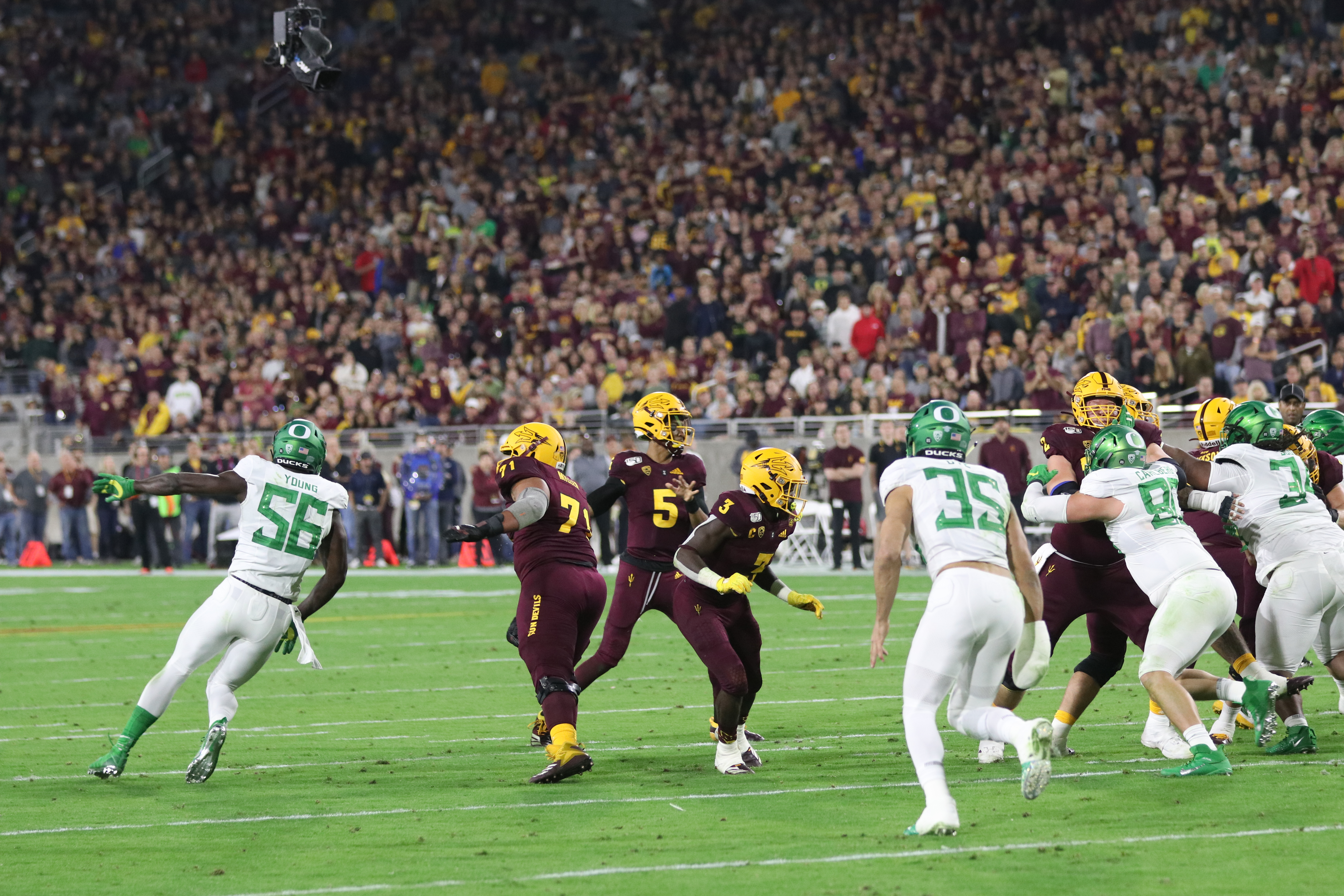
Freshman quarterback Jayden Daniels (#5) attempting a pass against the #6 Oregon Ducks. The Sun Devils would win 31–28.

No. 6 Oregon Ducks (9–1) at Arizona State Sun Devils (5–5) – Game summary

Quarter	1	2	3	4	Total
No. 6 Ducks	7	0	0	21	28
Sun Devils	7	3	3	18	31

at Sun Devil Stadium • Tempe, AZ

- Date: November 23, 2019
- Game time: 5:30 p.m.
- Game weather: Partly cloudy, 69 °F (21 °C)
- Game attendance: 51,875
- Referee: Michael Mothershed
- TV announcers (ABC): Chris Fowler (play-by-play), Kirk Herbstreit (analyst), Maria Taylor (sideline reporter)

Game information

First quarter

- (6:32) ORE – Cyrus Habibi-Likio 5-yard run, Camden Lewis kick (Drive: 11 plays, 80 yards 3:48; Oregon 7–0)
- (4:55) ASU – Frank Darby 57-yard pass from Jayden Daniels, Christian Zendejas kick (Drive: 4 plays, 75 yards, 1:37; Tied 7–7)

Second quarter

- (3:40) ASU – Christian Zendejas 25-yard field goal (Drive: 11 plays, 69 yards, 6:54; Arizona State 10–7 )

Third quarter

- (12:13) ASU – Christian Zendejas 28-yard field goal (Drive: 7 plays, 65 yards, 2:47; Arizona State 13–7)

Fourth quarter

- (12:43) ASU – Frank Darby 26-yard pass from Jayden Daniels, Jayden Daniels two-point pass to Eno Benjamin (Drive: 4 plays, 32 yards, 2:10; Arizona State 21–7)
- (8:42) ASU – Christian Zendejas 22-yard field goal (Drive: 6 plays, 16 yards, 3:17; Arizona State 24–7)
- (7:43) ORE – Cyrus Habibi-Likio 10-yard run, Camden Lewis kick (Drive: 3 plays, 75 yards, 0:59; Arizona State 24–14)
- (5:24) ORE – Johnny Johnson III 24-yard pass from Justin Herbert, Camden Lewis kick (Drive: 3 plays, 66 yards, 0:43; Arizona State 24–21)
- (3:54) ASU – Brandon Aiyuk 81-yard pass from Jayden Daniels, Christian Zendejas kick (Drive: 3 plays, 75 yards, 1:30; Arizona State 31–21)
- (2:04) ORE – Johnny Johnson III 17-yard pass from Justin Herbert, Camden Lewis kick (Drive: 9 plays, 61 yards, 1:50; Arizona State 31–28)

Statistics	ORE	ASU
First downs	25	22
Total yards	458	535
Rushing yards	28–154	41–127
Passing yards	304	408
Passing: Comp–Att–Int	20–36–2	22–33–0
Time of possession	23:07	36:53

Team	Category	Player	Statistics
Oregon	Passing	Justin Herbert	20/36, 304 yards, 2 TD, 2 INT
Oregon	Rushing	CJ Verdell	18 carries, 99 yards
Oregon	Receiving	Johnny Johnson III	10 receptions, 207 yards, 2 TD
Arizona State	Passing	Jayden Daniels	22/32, 408 yards, 3 TD
Arizona State	Rushing	Eno Benjamin	31 carries, 114 yards
Arizona State	Receiving	Brandon Aiyuk	7 receptions, 161 yards, TD

=== vs Arizona ===
Arizona Wildcats (4–7) at Arizona State Sun Devils (6–5) – Game summary

Quarter	1	2	3	4	Total
Wildcats	0	7	0	7	14
Sun Devils	0	6	15	3	24

at Sun Devil Stadium • Tempe, AZ

- Date: November 30, 2019
- Game time: 8:00 P.M.
- Game weather: Mostly Clear Skies, 51 °F (11 °C)
- Game attendance: 54,074
- Referee: Steve Strimling
- TV announcers (ESPN): Mark Jones (play by play), Dusty Dvoracek (analyst), Olivia Dekker (sideline reporter)

Game information

First quarter

- No scoring plays

Second quarter

- (13:07) ASU – Christian Zendejas 33-yard field goal (Drive: 6 plays, 25 yards, 2:07; Arizona State 3–0)
- (7:04) ARIZ – Jamarye Joiner 48-yard pass from Khalil Tate, Lucas Havrisik kick (Drive: 6 plays, 83 yards, 2:13; Arizona 7–3)
- (0:00) ASU – Christian Zendejas 24-yard field goal (Drive: 7 plays, 69 yards, 1:50; Arizona 7–6)

Third quarter

- (9:30) ASU – Eno Benjamin 6-yard run, Christian Zendejas kick (Drive: 11 plays, 75 yards, 5:30; Arizona State 13–7)
- (1:20) ASU – Eno Benjamin 1-yard run, Jayden Daniels run for two-point conversion (Drive: 7 plays, 49 yards, 2:45; Arizona State 21–7)

Fourth quarter

- (7:16) ASU – Christian Zendejas 26-yard field goal (Drive: 12 plays, 72 yards, 6:29; Arizona State 24–7)
- (4:48) ARIZ – Jamarye Joiner 2-yard pass from Khalil Tate, Lucas Havrisik kick (Drive: 9 plays, 66 yards, 2:20; Arizona State 24–14)

Statistics	ARIZ	ASU
First downs	19	23
Total yards	383	338
Rushing yards	32–155	55–234
Passing yards	228	104
Passing: Comp–Att–Int	22–38–3	12–19–0
Time of possession	25:31	34:29

Team	Category	Player	Statistics
Arizona	Passing	Khalil Tate	22/38, 228 yards, 2 TD, 3 INT
Arizona	Rushing	Khalil Tate	11 carries, 78 yards
Arizona	Receiving	Jamarye Joiner	7 receptions, 140 yards, 2 TD
Arizona State	Passing	Jayden Daniels	12/19, 104 yards
Arizona State	Rushing	Eno Benjamin	34 carries, 168 yards, 2 TD
Arizona State	Receiving	Brandon Aiyuk	5 receptions, 67 yards

=== vs Florida State (Sun Bowl) ===
Arizona State Sun Devils (7–5) vs Florida State Seminoles (6–6) – Game summary
(2019 Tony the Tiger Sun Bowl)

Quarter	1	2	3	4	Total
Sun Devils	3	6	0	11	20
Seminoles	0	0	14	0	14

at Sun Bowl • El Paso, TX

- Date: December 31, 2019
- Game time: 12:00 p.m.
- Game weather: Mostly Sunny, 48 °F (9 °C)
- Game attendance: 42,412
- Referee: David Smith
- TV announcers (CBS): Brad Nessler (play-by-play), Gary Danielson (analyst), Jamie Erdahl (sideline reporter)

Game information

First Quarter

- (3:57) ASU – Cristian Zendejas 40-yard field goal (Drive: 4 plays, –9 yards, 2:00; Arizona State 3–0)

Second Quarter

- (7:58) ASU – Cristian Zendejas 26-yard field goal (Drive: 8 plays, 84 yards, 3:37; Arizona State 6–0)
- (4:33) ASU – Cristian Zendejas 24-yard field goal (Drive: 7 plays, 44 yards, 2:03; Arizona State 9–0)

Third Quarter

- (3:17) FSU – Ontaria Wilson 3-yard run, Ricky Aguayo kick (Drive: 11 plays, 91 yards, 3:46; Arizona State 9–7)
- (1:04) FSU – Tamorrion Terry 91-yard pass from James Blackman, Ricky Aguayo kick (Drive: 1 play, 91 yards, 0:13; Florida State 14–9)

Fourth Quarter

- (12:02) ASU – Cristian Zendejas 34-yard field goal (Drive: 12 plays, 59 yards, 4:02; Florida State 14–12)
- (10:06) ASU – Willie Harts 25-yard interception return, Jayden Daniels run for two-point conversion (Arizona State 20–14)

Statistics	ASU	FSU
First downs	13	21
Total yards	282	470
Rushing yards	37–87	51–224
Passing yards	195	246
Passing: Comp–Att–Int	12–28–0	16–29–4
Time of possession	28:56	31:04

Team	Category	Player	Statistics
Arizona State	Passing	Jayden Daniels	12/28, 195 yards
Arizona State	Rushing	Jayden Daniels	12 carries, 36 yards
Arizona State	Receiving	Kyle Williams	2 receptions, 76 yards
Florida State	Passing	James Blackman	14/26, 244 yards, TD, 4 INT
Florida State	Rushing	Deonte Sheffield	18 carries, 87 yards
Florida State	Receiving	Tamorrion Terry	9 receptions, 165 yards, TD

Quarterback Jayden Daniels was named MVP.

== Rankings ==
Ranking movements Legend: ██ Increase in ranking ██ Decrease in ranking — = Not ranked RV = Received votes
	Week																
Poll	Pre	1	2	3	4	5	6	7	8	9	10	11	12	13	14	15	Final
AP	RV	RV	RV	24	RV	20	18	17	24	—	—	—	—	RV	RV	RV	RV
Coaches	RV	RV	RV	24	RV	RV	24	17	24	RV	—	—	—	—	RV	RV	—
CFP	Not released										—	—	—	—	—	—	Not released

== Personnel ==
=== Coaching staff ===
Name	Position	Consecutive season at Arizona State in current position
Herm Edwards	Head coach	2nd Year
Donnie Yantis	Assistant head coach/recruiting coordinator	2nd Year
Shaun Aguano	Assistant head coach/running backs coach	1st Year
Shawn Slocum	Associate head coach/special teams coordinator/linebackers coach	2nd Year
Danny Gonzales	Defensive coordinator	2nd Year
Rob Likens	Offensive coordinator/quarterbacks coach	3rd Year
Tony White	Assistant coach/passing game coordinator/cornerbacks coach	2nd Year
Antonio Pierce	Assistant coach/linebackers coach	2nd Year
Dave Christensen	Assistant coach/offensive line coach	2nd Year
Charlie Fisher	Assistant coach/wide receivers coach	2nd Year
Jamar Cain	Assistant coach/defensive line coach	1st Year
Marvin Lewis	Special advisor	1st year

=== Roster ===
2019 Arizona State Sun Devils roster
Quarterbacks: 5 Jayden Daniels, Freshman (6'3, 175); 7 Ethan Long, Freshman (6'2, 221); 15 Dillon Sterling-Cole, (redshirt) Junior (6'3, 219); 16 Trenton Bourguet, Freshman (5'11, 171); 18 Joey Yellen, Freshman (6'3, 210); Running backs: 3 Eno Benjamin, Junior (5'10, 210); 9 Demetrious Flowers, Freshman (6'0, 201); 25 A.J. Carter, Sophomore (6'0, 218); 31 Isaiah Floyd, (redshirt) Sophomore (5'7, 176); 36 Demarcus Johnson, Freshman (5'10, 190); 39 Nick Johnson, Freshman (5'9, 160); Wide receivers: 2 Brandon Aiyuk, Senior (6'1, 206); 6 Geordon Porter, (redshirt) Freshman (6'2, 190); 8 Jordan Kerley, Freshman (6'2, 184); 10 Kyle Williams, Senior (5'11, 192); 17 Ryan Newsome, (redshirt) Senior (5'9, 184); 19 Ricky Pearsall, Freshman (6'1, 190); 26 Keith Davis, (redshirt) Freshman (6'1, 187); 28 Angel Ruiz, (redshirt) Freshman (5'11, 173); 35 Devin Neal, Junior (6'0, 171); 82 Andre Johnson, Freshman (6'3, 190); 83 Tanner Park, (redshirt) Sophomore (6'3, 185); 84 Frank Darby, (redshirt) Junior (6'1, 200); 85 Brandon Pierce, Junior (5'11, 175); 86 Curtis Hodges, Junior (6'8, 237); 89 Josh Hart, Freshman (6'0, 191)	Tight ends: 80 Grant Miles, (redshirt) Freshman (6'4, 245); 81 Jared Bubak, (redshirt) Junior (6'5, 242); 87 Tommy Hudson, (redshirt) Senior (6'5, 255); 88 Nolan Matthews, Freshman (6'5, 246); Offensive lineman: 50 Jarrett Bell, (redshirt) Freshman (6'5, 299); 51 Zach Robertson, (redshirt) Senior (6'6, 336); 52 Cody Shear, (redshirt) Sophomore (6'4, 280); 56 Alex Losoya, (redshirt) Senior (6'3, 291); 59 Marco Salas, (redshirt) Freshman (6'4, 291); 60 Kyle Breed, (redshirt) Sophomore (6'7, 288); 61 Dohnovan West, Freshman (6'3, 277); 63 Roy Hemsley, (redshirt) Senior (6'6, 325); 64 Eddie Medina, (redshirt) Freshman (6'3, 285); 65 Donato Zavala, Freshman (6'5, 306); 66 Ben Scott, Freshman (6'5, 291); 67 Matthew Kickel, Freshman (6'3, 285); 69 Jonathan Sanchez, (redshirt) Sophomore (6'2, 276); 71 Steven Miller, (redshirt) Senior (6'4, 307); 72 Cade Cote, (redshirt) Senior (6'3, 290); 73 Cohl Cabral, Senior (6'5, 304); 74 Corey Stephens, Junior (6'3, 285); 76 Spencer Lovell, (redshirt) Freshman (6'6, 309); 77 LaDarius Henderson, Freshman (6'4, 285); 78 Roman Dewys, Freshman (6'5, 299); 79 Ralph Frias, (redshirt) Freshman (6'6, 320)	Defensive line: 9 Stephon Wright, Freshman (6'4, 297); 17 George Lea, (redshirt) Senior (6'3, 284); 41 Tyler Johnson, (redshirt) Sophomore (6'5, 258); 44 T.J. Pesefea, Sophomore (6'5, 313); 62 Alexander Randle, Freshman (6'2, 259); 75 Alijah Bates, Freshman (6'8, 275); 90 Jermayne Lole, Sophomore (6'2, 284); 91 Michael Matus, (redshirt) Freshman (6'2, 253); 92 Jose Lugo, Freshman (6'3, 270); 94 Parker Jacobs, Freshman (6'4, 252); 95 Roe Wilkins, (redshirt) Senior (6'4, 273); 96 Anthonie Cooper, Freshman (6'2, 280); 97 Shannon Forman, Junior (6'2, 293); 98 DJ Davidson, (redshirt) Sophomore (6'4, 213); 99 Amiri Johnson, Freshman (6'6, 225); Linebackers: 8 Merlin Robertson, Sophomore (6'3, 251); 14 Stanley Lambert, (redshirt) Freshman (6'4, 225); 20 Khaylan Kearse-Thomas, (redshirt) Senior (6'1, 224); 23 Tyler Whiley, Graduate Student (6'0, 205); 29 Ely Doyle, (redshirt) Freshman (6'0, 200); 30 Elijah Juarez, Freshman (6'4, 240); 34 Kyle Soelle, (redshirt) Sophomore (6'3, 225); 37 Darien Butler, Sophomore (5'11, 242); 46 Oliver Carras, Freshman (6'3, 210); 52 Jacob Jornadal, Freshman (5'11, 190); 53 Fritzny Niclasse, Freshman (5'11, 213); 54 Case Hatch, Freshman (6'1, 226); 55 Abe Schwinn, Freshman (6'0, 213)	Defensive backs: 1 Jordan Clark, Freshman (5'10, 170); 3 Willie Harts, Freshman (6'0, 162); 4 Evan Fields, Junior (6'0, 193); 5 Kobe Williams, Senior (5'10, 174); 6 Timarcus Davis, (redshirt) Sophomore (6'0, 177); 10 K.J Jarrell, (redshirt) Sophomore (6'2, 186); 12 Kejuan Markham, Freshman (6'1, 189); 13 Keon Markham, Freshman (6'1, 203); 15 Cam Philips, (redshirt) Freshman (6'1, 175); 16 Aashari Crosswell, Sophomore (6'0, 196); 18 Connor Soelle, Freshman (6'1, 201); 21 Jack Jones, (redshirt) Junior (5'11, 170); 22 Darien Cornay, Senior (5'11, 188); 24 Chase Lucas, (redshirt) Junior (6'0, 176); 35 Jacob Desmarais, Freshman (5'10, 169); 36 Alijah Gammage, (redshirt) Freshman (5'11, 179); 38 Damon Matthews, Freshman (5'9, 176); 47 Thomas Shorack, Freshman (5'10, 163); 48 Vincenzo Granatelli, Junior (6'4, 184); 57 Armand Reichelt, Freshman (6'2, 192); Kickers: 1 Brandon Ruiz, Junior (5'10, 176); 14 Jack Luckhurst, Freshman (6'2, 164); 45 Cristian Zendejas, (redshirt) Sophomore (5'8, 180); Punters: 25 Michael Turk, (redshirt) Sophomore (6'1, 228); 44 Kevin Macias, (redshirt) Junior (5'11, 201); 46 Josh Plaster, Freshman (6'0, 176); Long snappers: 49 Gage King, Freshman (6'3, 238); 93 Erik Dickerson, (redshirt) Junior (6'1, 224)

=== Depth chart ===
Defense

S
Evan Fields
Tyler Whiley
Connor Soelle

FS
Aashari Crosswell
Kejuan Markham
⋅

WLB	MLB	SLB
Khaylan Kearse-Thomas	Merlin Robertson	Darien Butler
⋅	Case Hatch	Kyle Soelle
⋅	⋅	Stanley Lambert

SS
Cam Phillips
Willie Harts
K. J. Jarrell

CB
Kobe Williams
Jordan Clark
Preston Liger

DE	NT	DE
George Lea	DJ Davidson	Jermayne Lole
Michael Matus	Shannon Forman	Roe Wilkins
Stephon Wright	T. J. Pesefea	Anthonie Cooper

CB
Chase Lucas
Timarcus Davis
Darien Cornay

Offense

WR
Brandon Aiyuk
Ricky Pearsall
Andre Johnson

WR
Frank Darby
Jordan Kerley
Keith Davis

LT	LG	C	RG	RT
Cohl Cabral	Alex Losoya	Cade Cote	Roy Hemsley	Steve Miller
LaDarius Henderson	Cody Shear	Dohnovan West	Jarrett Bell	Spencer Lovell
Alijah Bates	Roman DeWys	–	Ben Scott	Ralph Frias

WR
Tommy Hudson
Nolan Matthews
Jared Bubak

WR
Kyle Williams
Ryan Newsome
Angel Ruiz

QB
Jayden Daniels
Joey Yellen
Dillon Sterling-Cole

RB
Eno Benjamin
A. J. Carter
⋅

Special teams
PK Christian Zendejas
PK Kevin Macias
P Michael Turk
KR A. J. Carter
Brandon Aiyuk
PR Brandon Aiyuk
LS Erik Dickerson
H Kevin Macias
