= Jordan Clark (American football) =

American football player (born 2001)

No. 33 – New York Jets
- Position: Cornerback
- Roster status: Practice squad

Personal information
- Born: April 22, 2001 (age 25); Baton Rouge, Louisiana, U.S.
- Listed height: 5 ft 9 in (1.75 m)
- Listed weight: 184 lb (83 kg)

Career information
- High school: University Lab (Baton Rouge)
- College: Arizona State (2019–2023); Notre Dame (2024)
- NFL draft: 2025: undrafted

Career history
- New York Jets (2025–present)

Career NFL statistics as of 2025
- Total tackles: 9
- Games played: 6
- Stats at Pro Football Reference

Jordan Clark (born April 22, 2001) is an American professional football cornerback for the New York Jets of the National Football League (NFL). He played college football for the Arizona State Sun Devils and Notre Dame Fighting Irish.

== Early life ==
Clark attended Louisiana State University Laboratory School in Baton Rouge, Louisiana. He played in the Under Armour All-America Game. He committed to play college football for the Arizona State Sun Devils.

== College career ==
After five seasons at Arizona State, Clark transferred to Notre Dame.

=== College statistics ===
| Year | Team | Games | | Tackles | | | | Interceptions | | | | Fumbles | | |
| Year | Team | GP | GS | Total | Solo | Ast | Sack | PD | Int | Yds | TD | FF | FR | TD |
|---|---|---|---|---|---|---|---|---|---|---|---|---|---|---|
| 2019 | Arizona State | 2 | 0 | 5 | 5 | 0 | 0.0 | 0 | 0 | 0 | 0 | 0 | 0 | 0 |
| 2020 | Arizona State | 4 | 2 | 16 | 11 | 5 | 0.0 | 2 | 0 | 0 | 0 | 0 | 0 | 0 |
| 2021 | Arizona State | 12 | 2 | 21 | 19 | 2 | 0.0 | 2 | 1 | 0 | 0 | 0 | 0 | 0 |
| 2022 | Arizona State | 11 | 9 | 47 | 36 | 11 | 0.0 | 4 | 2 | 38 | 1 | 0 | 0 | 0 |
| 2023 | Arizona State | 11 | 10 | 50 | 30 | 20 | 0.0 | 9 | 0 | 0 | 0 | 0 | 0 | 0 |
| 2024 | Notre Dame | 16 | 8 | 37 | 29 | 8 | 0.0 | 5 | 1 | 2 | 0 | 0 | 0 | 0 |
| Career | | 56 | 31 | 176 | 130 | 46 | 0.0 | 22 | 4 | 40 | 1 | 0 | 0 | 0 |

== Professional career ==
Pre-draft measurables
| Height | Weight | Arm length | Hand span | Wingspan | 40-yard dash | 10-yard split | 20-yard split | 20-yard shuttle | Three-cone drill | Vertical jump | Broad jump | Bench press |
|---|---|---|---|---|---|---|---|---|---|---|---|---|
| 5 ft 9 1/4 in (1.76 m) | 184 lb (83 kg) | 29 3/8 in (0.75 m) | 8 3/4 in (0.22 m) | 5 ft 11 3/8 in (1.81 m) | 4.64 s | 1.62 s | 2.70 s | 4.34 s | 7.33 s | 36.5 in (0.93 m) | 10 ft 4 in (3.15 m) | 18 reps |
All values from Pro Day

Clark signed with the New York Jets as an undrafted free agent on May 9, 2025. Clark was waived on August 26 and re-signed to the practice squad the next day. On December 6, Clark was signed to the active roster.

On August 30, 2026, Clark was waived by the Jets as a part of final roster cuts; he was re-signed to the team's practice squad the following day. He was promoted to the active roster on September 15. On September 29, Clark was waived and re-signed to the practice squad two days later.

== Personal life ==
Clark is the son of former NFL safety Ryan Clark, who currently hosts the weekly highlight show Inside the NFL.
