= U-High =

U-High may refer to:

- Louisiana State University Laboratory School
- University of Chicago Laboratory Schools
