= Beau Brinkley =

American football player (born 1990)

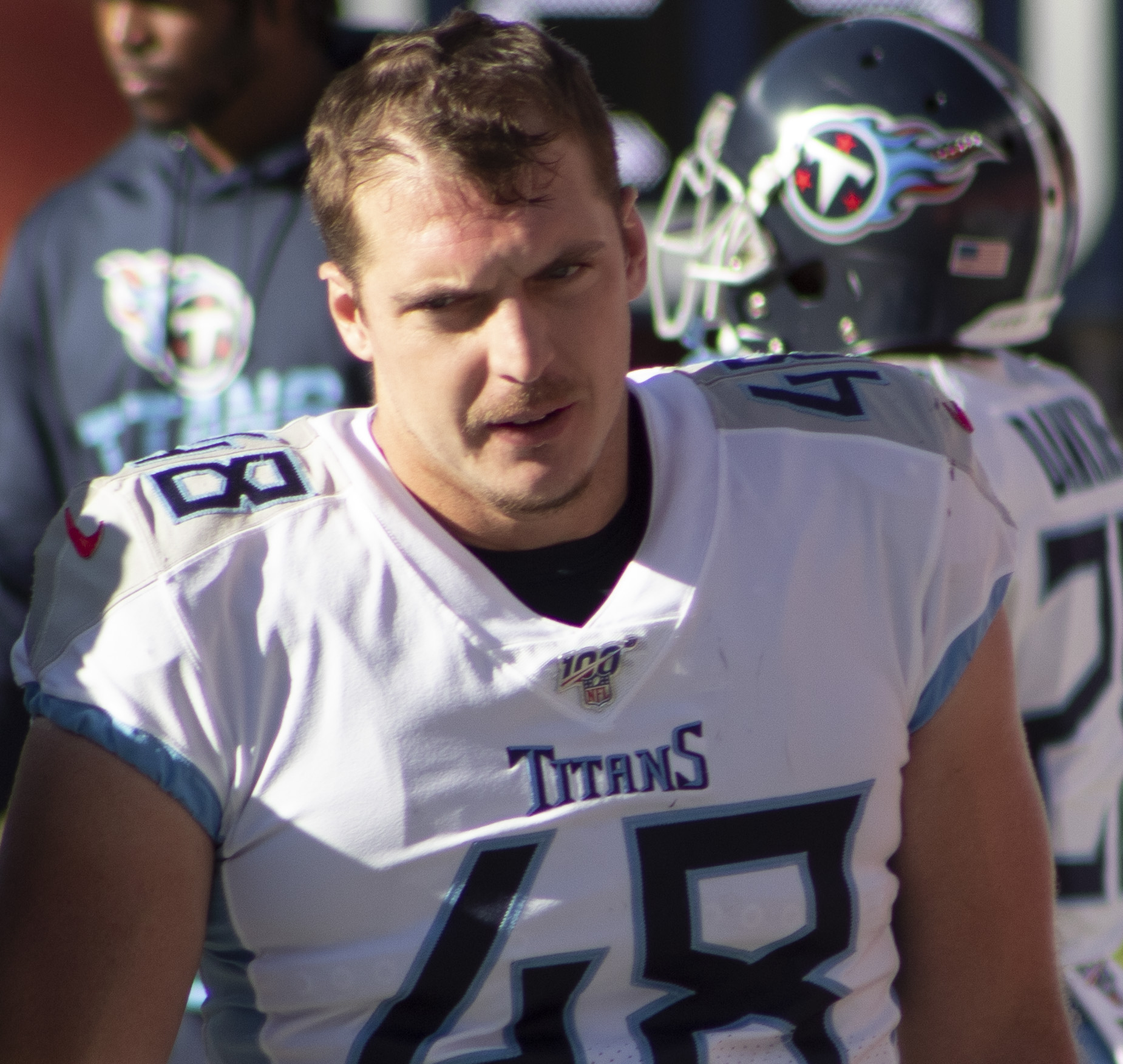
- Brinkley with the Tennessee Titans in 2019

No. 43, 48
- Position: Long snapper

Personal information
- Born: January 25, 1990 (age 36); Kansas City, Missouri, U.S
- Listed height: 6 ft 4 in (1.93 m)
- Listed weight: 260 lb (118 kg)

Career information
- High school: Kearney (MO)
- College: Missouri (2008–2011)
- NFL draft: 2012: undrafted

Career history
- Tennessee Titans (2012–2020); Detroit Lions (2021)*; Arizona Cardinals (2021); Los Angeles Chargers (2021)*; Chicago Bears (2022)*; Atlanta Falcons (2022)
- * Offseason or practice squad member only

Career NFL statistics
- Games played: 138
- Total tackles: 33
- Stats at Pro Football Reference

Beau Michael Brinkley (born January 25, 1990) is an American former professional football player who was a long snapper. He played college football at Missouri.

== College career ==
Brinkley played college football at the university of Missouri. In his four years at Missouri, he finished with 12 tackles. In his senior season, he recorded 5 tackles for the season. In his junior year, Brinkley was the team's long snapper for the third consecutive season. In his sophomore year, he was selected as the MU Special Teams MVP. In his freshman year, Brinkley was selected as the MU Walk-on MVP.

== Professional career ==
=== Tennessee Titans ===
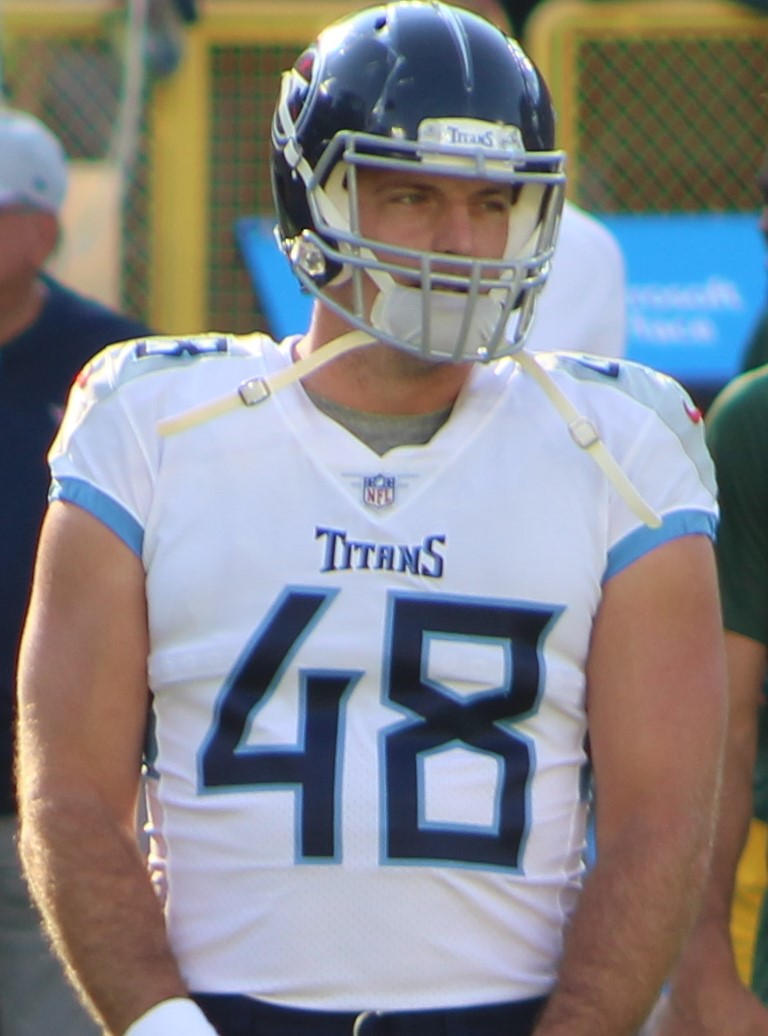
Brinkley with the Tennessee Titans, 2018

On April 30, 2012, Brinkley signed with the Tennessee Titans as an undrafted free agent. He made his NFL debut against the New England Patriots on September 9.

On March 8, 2015, Brinkley signed a five-year contract extension with the Titans worth $5.75 million.

On September 30, 2018, in a 26–23 overtime victory against the Philadelphia Eagles, Brinkley played his 100th career game. The Titans finished with their third consecutive 9–7 season, but did not qualify for the playoffs, with Brinkley snapping for punter Brett Kern as he was named to his second consecutive Pro Bowl and was named Second-team All-Pro.

Entering the final year of his contract, Brinkley signed a multi-year contract extension with the Titans on September 6, 2019. During the season, he snapped for Brett Kern as he was named to his third consecutive Pro Bowl and was named First-team All-Pro. On December 18, Brinkley was announced to be a Pro Bowl alternate for the 2020 Pro Bowl. The Titans finished with a fourth consecutive 9–7 record and qualified for the playoffs, where they won upsets over the New England Patriots and the Baltimore Ravens before losing to eventual Super Bowl champions, the Kansas City Chiefs in the AFC Championship Game.

On September 29, 2020, Brinkley, along with DaQuan Jones and practice squad player Tommy Hudson were placed on the reserve/COVID-19 list by the team. He was activated on October 11. Brinkley was released on November 3.

=== Detroit Lions ===
On September 25, 2021, Brinkley was signed to the Detroit Lions practice squad, but was released two days later.

=== Arizona Cardinals ===
On November 12, 2021, Brinkley was signed to the Arizona Cardinals practice squad. He was promoted to the active roster on November 20. He was waived on November 22 and re-signed to the practice squad. He was promoted back to the active roster on December 4. He was released on December 14.

=== Los Angeles Chargers ===
On December 28, 2021, Brinkley was signed to the Los Angeles Chargers practice squad. He was released on January 3, 2022.

=== Chicago Bears ===
On February 16, 2022, Brinkley was signed to the Chicago Bears. He was released by the team on March 17.

=== Atlanta Falcons ===
On April 4, 2022, Brinkley signed a one-year contract with the Atlanta Falcons. On May 2, Brinkley was placed on Injured reserve.
