= Jayden Daniels =

American football player (born 2000)

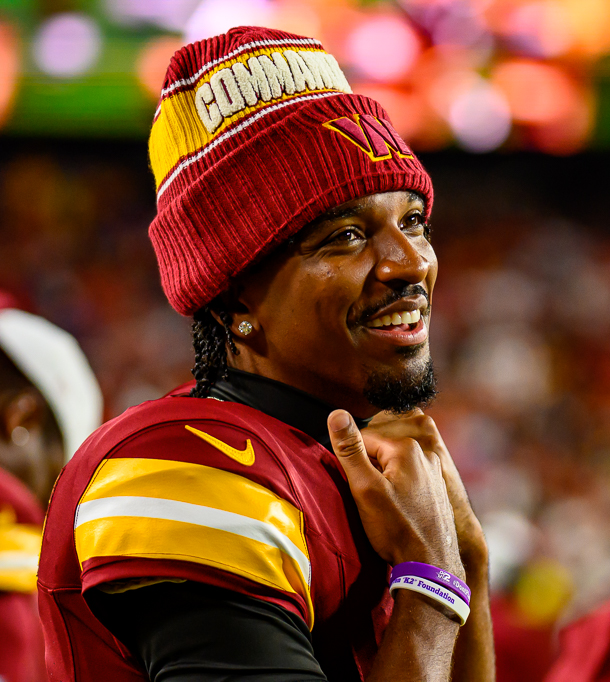
- Daniels with the Washington Commanders in 2025

No. 5 – Washington Commanders
- Position: Quarterback
- Roster status: Active

Personal information
- Born: December 18, 2000 (age 25); Fontana, California, U.S.
- Listed height: 6 ft 4 in (1.93 m)
- Listed weight: 210 lb (95 kg)

Career information
- High school: Cajon (San Bernardino, California)
- College: Arizona State (2019–2021); LSU (2022–2023)
- NFL draft: 2024: 1st round, 2nd overall pick

Career history
- Washington Commanders (2024–present)

Awards and highlights
- NFL Offensive Rookie of the Year (Note: AP • PFWA • The Sporting News) (2024); Pro Bowl (2024); Heisman Trophy (2023); SEC Male Athlete of the Year (2024)

Career NFL statistics as of Week 10, 2026
- Passing attempts: 881
- Passing completions: 583
- Completion percentage: 66.2%
- TD–INT: 43–14
- Passing yards: 6,329
- Passer rating: 96.8
- Rushing yards: 1,449
- Rushing touchdowns: 10
- Stats at Pro Football Reference

Jayden Daniels (born December 18, 2000) is an American professional football quarterback for the Washington Commanders of the National Football League (NFL). Daniels played three seasons of college football for the Arizona State Sun Devils and two with the LSU Tigers. With LSU in 2023, he won the Heisman Trophy among other awards after leading the NCAA Football Bowl Subdivision (FBS) in total yards and setting the single season passer rating record.

Daniels was selected by the Commanders second overall in the 2024 NFL draft. He set several rookie records while leading the Commanders to their most wins in a season and first NFC Championship Game appearance since 1991, earning Offensive Rookie of the Year honors. A walk-off touchdown pass thrown by Daniels during the final seconds of a game, known as the Hail Maryland, was also named the season's Moment of the Year.

== Early life ==
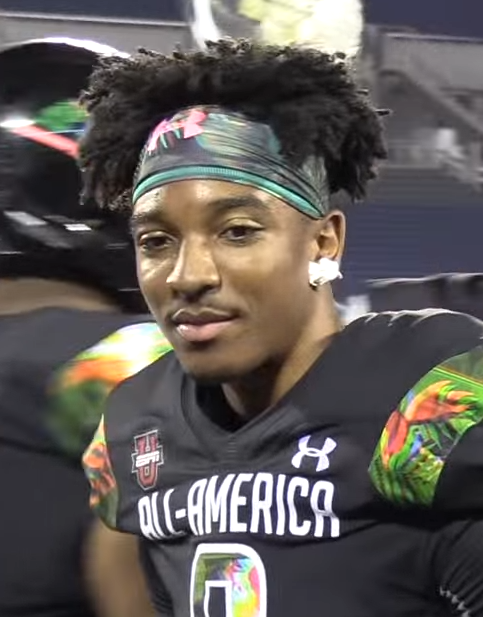
Daniels at the 2019 Under Armour High School All-America Game

Daniels was born in Fontana, California, on December 18, 2000, and raised in nearby San Bernardino. Daniels began playing flag football as a cornerback at age five in 2006 and as a quarterback in Pop Warner tackle football in 2008. He also ran track and played basketball and soccer as a youth before starting his freshman year at Cajon High School in 2015. Daniels initially needed a medical note to play due to being considered undersized by the team's coach at 125 pounds (57 kilograms). He started on Cajon's varsity team as a freshman and led the team to the 2015 CIF Southern Section (CIF-SS) Inland Division semifinals.

Daniels broke the little finger of his right hand attempting to recover a fumble in the first game of his 2016 sophomore season but played the rest of the season. He set a state record in 2017 with over 6,400 total yards in his junior season, leading Cajon to a Citrus Belt League (CBL) championship and an appearance in the Division 2-AA state finals. He led Cajon to another CBL championship and an appearance in the CIF-SS Division 3 championship as a senior in 2018. He was the men's recipient of the Ken Hubbs Award that season, given annually the top high school athletes in the San Bernardino area.

Daniels played 53 games at Cajon and set CIF-SS records with 210 touchdowns (Note: 170 passing and 40 rushing) and over 17,600 total yards. (Note: 14,007 passing and 3,635 rushing) He also participated in hurdling and the 100-meters, 200-meters, 400-meters, and 4 × 100-meters relay sprints at the school. He participated in the 2018 Elite 11 quarterback skills competition, sitting out of the finals due to a practice injury, and threw the game-winning touchdown in the 2019 Under Armour High School All-America Game. Daniels was ranked a four-star prospect and the top dual-threat quarterback of his class by college recruiting website 247Sports and received 25 college football scholarship offers before choosing the Sun Devils of Arizona State University (ASU) in December 2018. He graduated from Cajon and enrolled at ASU in January 2019.

College recruiting (2019)
Name	Hometown	School	Height	Weight	Commit date
Jayden Daniels; Quarterback	San Bernardino, CA	Cajon (CA)	6 ft 3 in (1.91 m)	172 lb (78 kg)	Dec 13, 2018
Jayden Daniels; Quarterback	Recruit ratings: Rivals: 247Sports: On3: ESPN: (86)				
Overall recruit ranking: Rivals: 57 247Sports: 35 On3: 50 ESPN: 44
Note: In many cases, Scout, Rivals, 247Sports, On3, and ESPN may conflict in their listings of height and weight.; In these cases, the average was taken. ESPN grades are on a 100-point scale.; Sources: "2019 Arizona State Football Commitment List". Rivals.; "Arizona State Sun Devils 2019 Player Commits". ESPN.; "2019 Team Ranking". Rivals.com.; "Arizona State 2019 Football Commits". 247Sports.; "2019 Arizona State Sun Devils Football Industry Comparison Commits". On3.

== College career ==
=== Arizona State ===
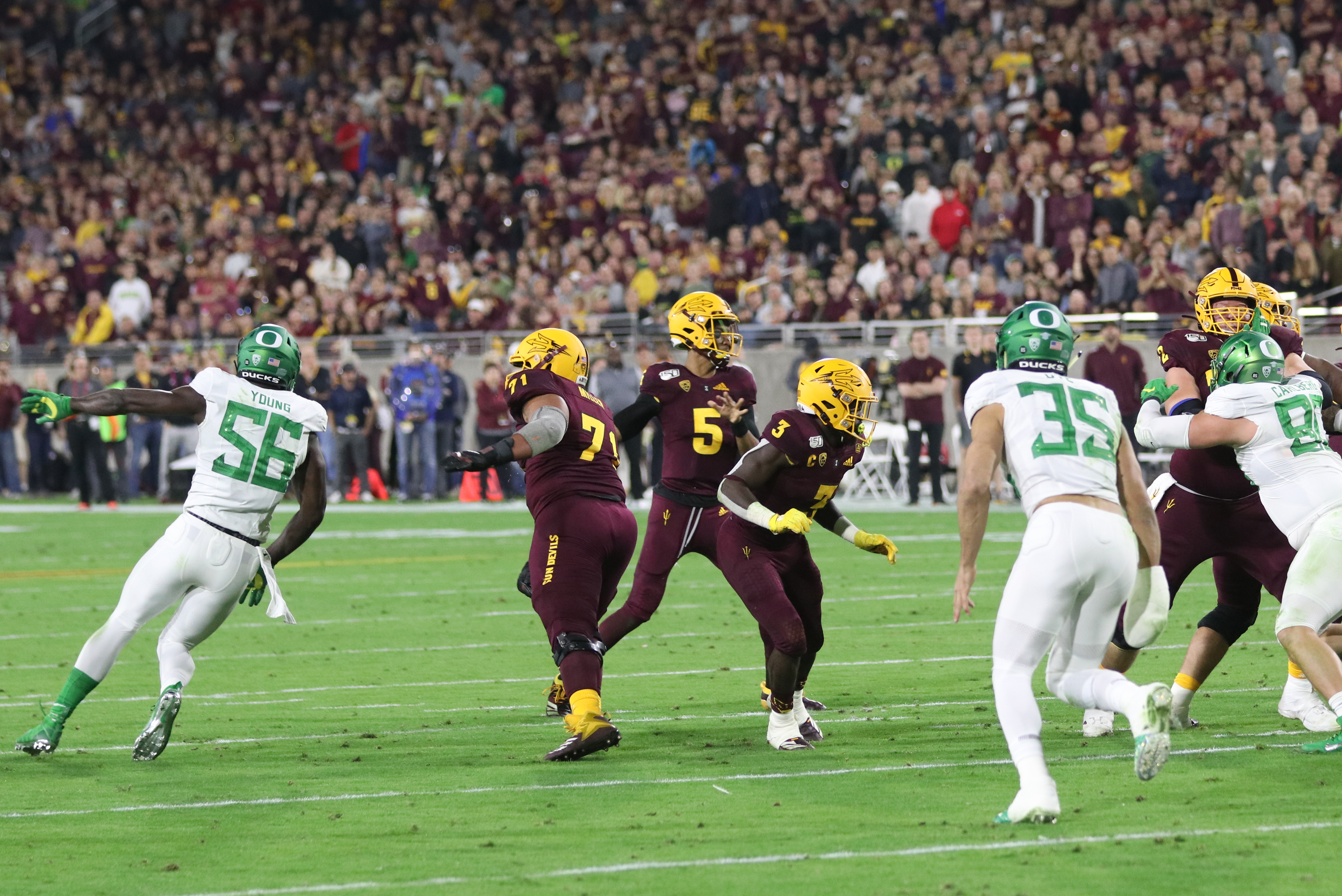
Daniels (center, No. 5) with Arizona State playing against the Oregon Ducks in 2019

Daniels was named the starter for the Sun Devils' 2019 season after winning a quarterback competition against Joey Yellen in the offseason. He was the first Sun Devils freshman quarterback to start opening week. He earned Pac-12 Conference offensive player of the week honors for week 13 in a 31–28 upset win over the No. 6 ranked Oregon Ducks after passing for 408 yards and three touchdowns, including an 81-yard pass to Brandon Aiyuk with under four minutes remaining. He was named the most valuable player of the 2019 Sun Bowl in a win over the Florida State Seminoles. Daniels set the Sun Devils' freshman passing yards record and was named to ESPN's freshman All-American team.

In the 2020 season, Daniels and the Sun Devils played only four games because of the COVID-19 pandemic. He earned offensive player of the week honors against UCLA in week 5 of the 2021 season with two touchdown passes to Ricky Pearsall of over 50 yards. He led the Pac-12 in completion percentage (65.4%) for the season and guided the team to a 8–4 record and an appearance in the 2021 Las Vegas Bowl. After the season, several of the team's coaches resigned or were fired following an NCAA investigation into COVID guideline violations that prohibited hosting recruits and off-campus travel for team staff; Daniels's mother Regina was also implicated in helping pay for flight tickets. Daniels entered the NCAA transfer portal in February 2022.

=== LSU ===
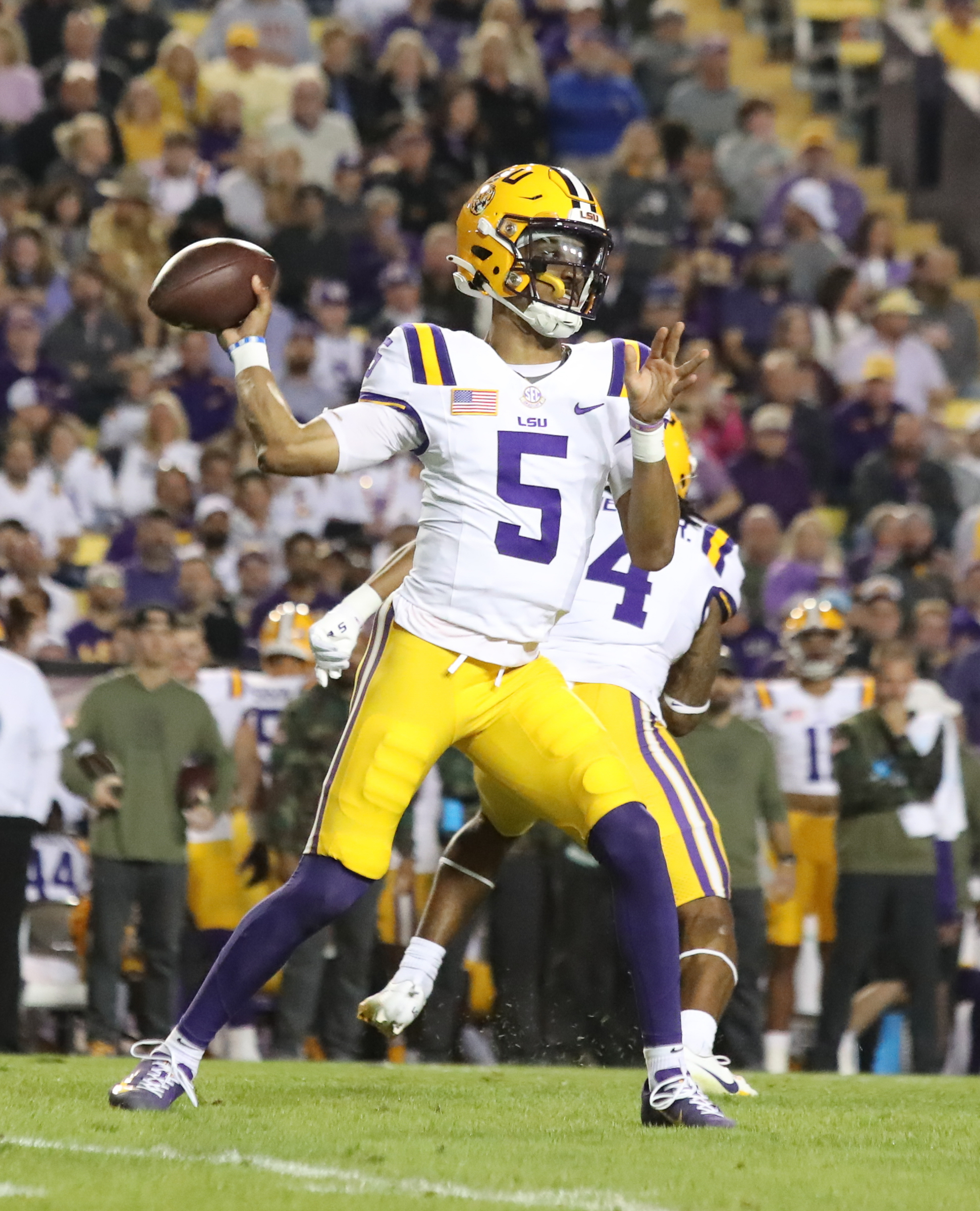
Daniels won the 2023 Heisman Trophy and several other awards after accounting for 50 touchdowns and nearly 5,000 total yards with the LSU Tigers.

Daniels transferred to Louisiana State University (LSU) in March 2022 to play for the Tigers. He competed with Garrett Nussmeier and Myles Brennan in camp and was named the starter for the 2022 season. In October, Daniels threw two touchdowns and ran for over 100 yards and three touchdowns in a win against No. 7 ranked Ole Miss, giving the Rebels their first loss of the season and earning Southeastern Conference (SEC) offensive player of the week honors. Daniels earned another player of the week honor against the No. 6 ranked Alabama Crimson Tide the following game after running for a 25-yard touchdown with a two-point conversion pass in overtime to win 32–31. He led the Tigers to a 9–3 regular season record and an appearance in the 2022 SEC Championship Game against the No. 1 ranked Georgia Bulldogs. Daniels, playing on a sprained ankle, left the game after being sacked by Jalen Carter late in the second quarter. He returned for the 2023 Citrus Bowl against the Purdue Boilermakers and caught a touchdown pass thrown by wide receiver Malik Nabers in a 63–7 win. Daniels was named a semifinalist for the Davey O'Brien Award and was voted the team's most valuable player after throwing 28 touchdowns and leading the team in rushing yards.

Daniels was named one of the team captains prior to the 2023 season. In Week 3 and 4, he earned SEC offensive player of the week honors after scoring four total touchdowns each against the Mississippi State Bulldogs and Arkansas Razorbacks. Daniels earned another player of the week honor two weeks later with four total touchdowns against the Missouri Tigers. He sustained a concussion from a hit by Dallas Turner in a week 9 game against No. 8 ranked Alabama and left the game. Daniels returned the following week against the Florida Gators and became the first player in NCAA Football Bowl Subdivision (FBS) history to have 350 passing and 200 rushing yards in a game. He tied an SEC record a week later against the Georgia State Panthers with eight total touchdowns. For the season Daniels threw 40 touchdowns and rushed for 10, led the team in rushing yards and the NCAA with nearly 5,000 total yards, and set the FBS single-season passer rating record. His performance earned him the 2023 Heisman Trophy and Walter Camp Award among other college football player of the year awards; he was the third LSU player to win the Heisman after Billy Cannon in 1959 and Joe Burrow in 2019. He also won the Davey O'Brien, Manning, and Johnny Unitas Golden Arm awards, earned Consensus All-American and All-SEC honors, and was named the SEC's offensive player and male athlete of the year. Daniels sat out of the ReliaQuest Bowl in January to prepare for the NFL draft. He finished his college career playing in 55 games with 16,000 total yards, ranking top ten in FBS history.

== Professional career ==
=== 2024 season ===
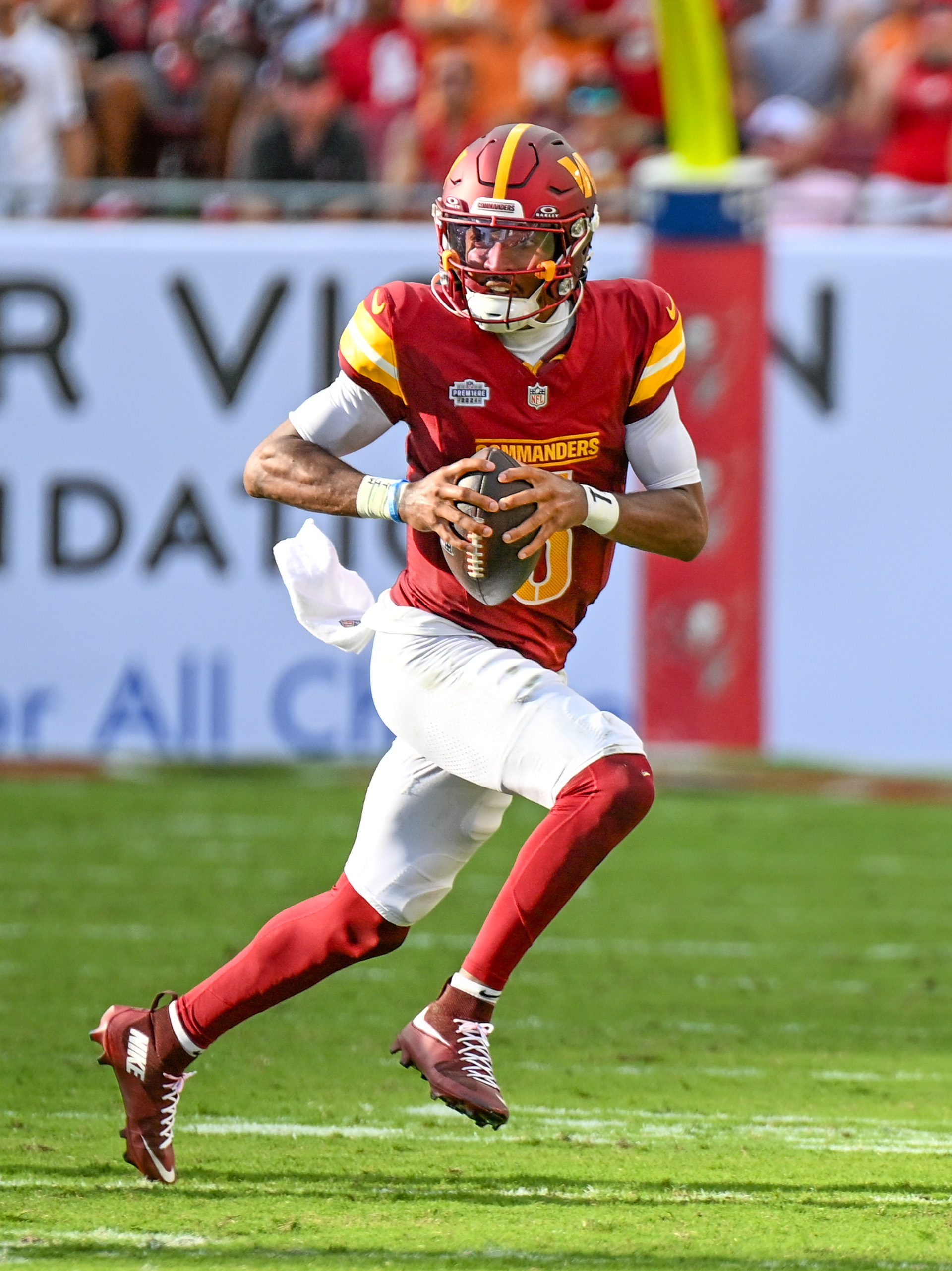
Daniels with the Washington Commanders in 2024. He was named the NFL Offensive Rookie of the Year that season after setting various rookie records and leading the team to the NFC Championship Game.

Daniels was selected second overall by the Washington Commanders in the 2024 NFL draft. He was the second of six quarterbacks taken in the first round, tying the 1983 draft for the most in NFL history. In the offseason, Daniels and former LSU teammate Malik Nabers received guidance from the league on its gambling policy for proposing a friendly US$10,000 bet on which of the two would earn Offensive Rookie of the Year honors. He acquired uniform number 5 in a non-monetary arrangement with Tress Way, who had worn it with the team since 2014. Daniels signed his four-year rookie contract, worth $37.75 million fully guaranteed, on June 14, 2024. He was named the Commanders' starting quarterback by the end of training camp.

Daniels scored two touchdowns in his NFL debut in a loss against the Tampa Bay Buccaneers; his first win occurred the following week against the New York Giants. In a week 3 win against the Cincinnati Bengals, he earned NFC Offensive Player of the Week honors after scoring three touchdowns and setting the NFL rookie completion percentage record (91.3%). He was later named the Offensive Rookie of the Month for September after completing the highest percentage of passes (82.1%) over a four-game span in NFL history. Daniels suffered a rib fracture against the Carolina Panthers in October after two defenders landed on him at the end of a 46-yard run in the first quarter; he was later ruled out for the rest of the game. He returned the following week against the Chicago Bears and threw a 52-yard Hail Mary touchdown as time expired to wide receiver Noah Brown to win 18–15. The play, dubbed the Hail Maryland, was later named the Moment of the Year at the 14th NFL Honors award ceremony. In December he became the sixth rookie in NFL history to throw five touchdowns in a game, doing so in a 36–33 comeback win against the Philadelphia Eagles.

Daniels finished the regular season having the most points per game (28.5) and highest completion percentage (69%) by a rookie in NFL history, additionally setting the NFL rookie quarterback rushing yards record (891) and the Commanders rookie passing yards record (3,568). (Note: Minimum of 100 attempts and seven starts) He also threw a rookie-record 12 touchdown passes in the fourth quarter or overtime. Five of those touchdowns occurred within the final 30 seconds, the most by any player since the AFL–NFL merger in 1970. The Commanders finished with a regular season record of 12–5, their best since 1991, and entered the 2024–25 playoffs as a sixth-seed Wild Card. The team broke their 19-year postseason win drought with road victories over the third-seeded Buccaneers and first-seeded Detroit Lions before losing to the eventual Super Bowl LIX champion Eagles in the NFC Championship Game, with Daniels recording the most passing yards (822), rushing yards (135), highest passer rating (116.2), and highest completion percentage (69.7%) (Note: Both with a minimum of 25 attempts) by a rookie quarterback in playoff history. He was named the Offensive Rookie of the Year and a Pro Bowl reserve with the seventh most Most Valuable Player (MVP) votes among players, with his season regarded by sportswriters and other NFL players as among the greatest by a rookie in league history. Daniels ranked 21st on the NFL Top 100 Players of 2025, a list voted on by NFL players following the season.

=== 2025 season ===
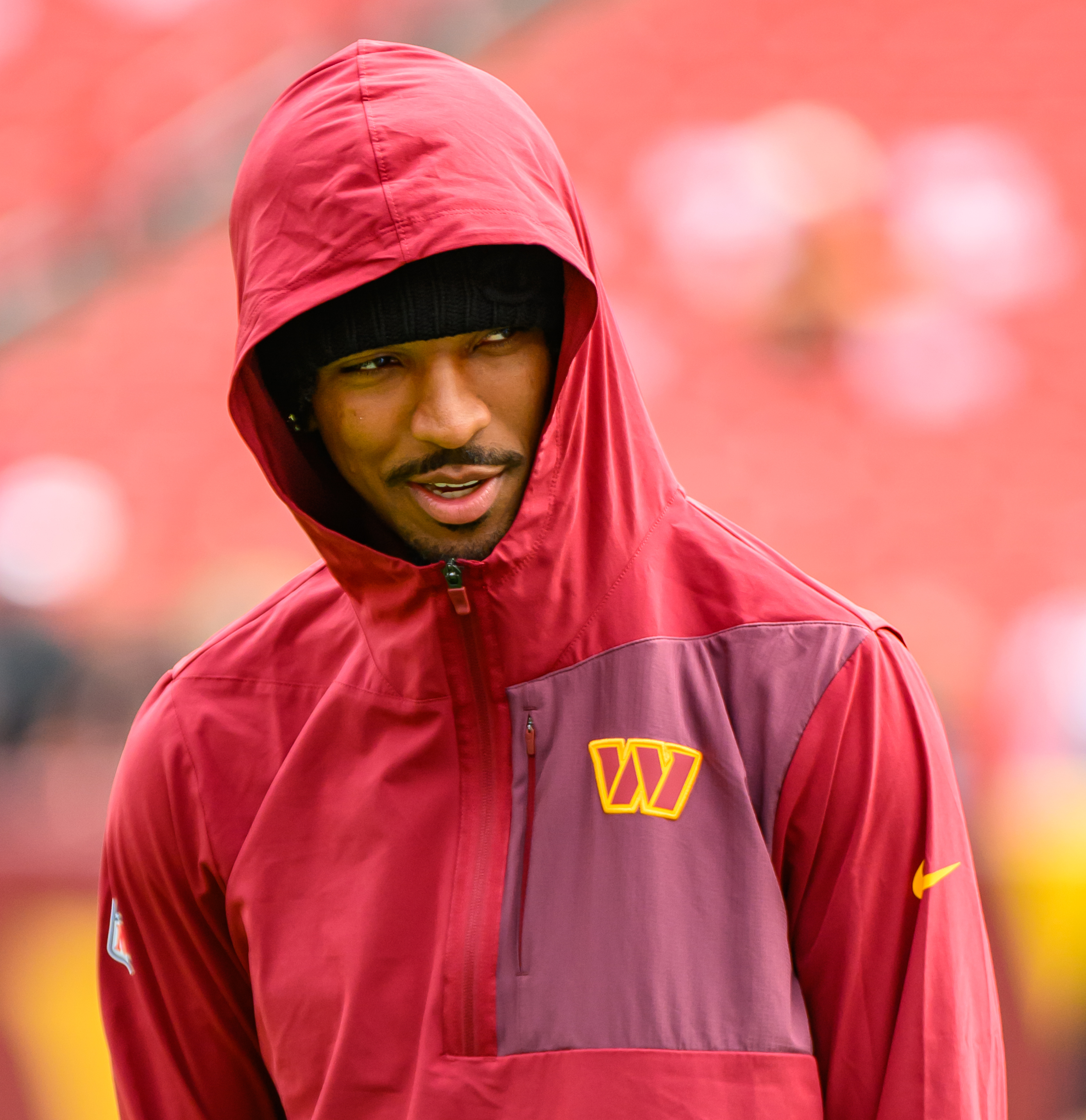
Daniels missed the majority of the 2025 season due to various injuries.

Following a season-opening win over the New York Giants, Daniels suffered a left knee sprain in a week 2 loss to the Green Bay Packers that kept him out of subsequent games against the Las Vegas Raiders and Atlanta Falcons. He returned in week 5 against the Los Angeles Chargers before suffering a right hamstring strain against the Dallas Cowboys in week 7, leading him to miss the following game against the Kansas City Chiefs. Daniels returned against the Seattle Seahawks in week 9 before suffering a dislocated left elbow on a sack late in the game. The injury was not considered season-ending. The coaching decision to keep playing Daniels down 38–7 against the Seahawks late in the fourth quarter, in which he had already taken several hits, faced criticism. Daniels returned against the Minnesota Vikings in week 14 but left in the second half following an interception and landing on his elbow after being pushed. He was later ruled out for the remainder of the season, missing ten games in total and the team finishing with a record of 5–12. The season drew comparisons to former Washington quarterback Robert Griffin III, another second overall pick of the team who had his career stunted by injuries after a promising 2012 rookie season.

=== 2026 season ===
Daniels dislocated his left elbow again in a Week 2 game against the Dallas Cowboys after twisting to stop a fall after snapping the ball on the goal line. He returned following a two week absence and rushed for two long touchdowns in a Week 5 matchup against the New York Giants, but a time management miscue in overtime led to the game ending in a 27-27 tie. In November, Daniels led the Commanders to a Sunday Night Football victory over the Philadelphia Eagles, giving him his first individual win in over a year.

== Player profile ==
Regarded as a dual-threat quarterback, Daniels is noted for having the combination of a drop-back passer's field awareness and accuracy with the speed and elusiveness to evade defenders on scrambles and keeper runs. His calm demeanor and composure in games, particularly in late-game and critical situations, are also regarded as strengths. Daniels's physique is described as "lanky" at 6 feet 4 inches (1.93 metres) tall and around 210 pounds (95 kilograms). He cites basketball player Kobe Bryant and football players Michael Vick, Donovan McNabb, and Reggie Bush as athletic inspirations, choosing 5 as his uniform number after McNabb and Bush. He uses virtual reality (VR) as part of his training with VR headset software designed by the German company Cognilize, allowing for custom formations and plays to be used and opposing players, teams, and their stadiums to be represented. He began the practice at LSU in 2023 and continued to use the technology in the NFL. Daniels often warms up before games with a basketball. He learned the routine from childhood friend and fellow NFL quarterback C. J. Stroud and cites it as helpful preparation with footballs feeling smaller and lighter afterwards.

== Statistics, awards, and records ==
=== NFL ===
Regular season statistics
Year	Team	Games			Passing										Rushing								Total	
Year	Team	GP	GS	Record	Cmp	Att	%	Yds	Y/G	Lng	TD	Int	Sck	Rtg	Car	Yds	Avg	Y/G	Lng	TD	Fum	Lost	Yds	TD
2024	WAS	17	17	**12–5**	**331**	**480**	**69.0**	**3,568**	**209.9**	**86**	**25**	**9**	**47**	**100.1**	**148**	**891**	**6.0**	**52.4**	**46**	**6**	**5**	0	**4,459**	**31**
2025	WAS	7	7	2–5	114	188	60.6	1,262	180.3	50	8	3	18	88.1	58	278	4.8	39.7	18	2	3	**1**	1,540	10
2026	WAS	7	7	2–4–1	138	213	64.8	1,499	214.1	53	10	2	17	97.1	42	280	6.7	40.0	38	2	2	0	1,579	12
Career		31	31	16–14–1	583	881	66.2	6,329	204.2	86	43	14	82	96.8	248	1,449	5.8	46.7	46	10	10	1	7,778	53

Playoff statistics
Year	Team	Games			Passing										Rushing								Total	
Year	Team	GP	GS	Record	Cmp	Att	%	Yds	Y/G	Lng	TD	Int	Sck	Rtg	Car	Yds	Avg	Y/G	Lng	TD	Fum	Lost	Yds	TD
2024	WAS	3	3	2–1	75	114	65.8	822	274.0	58	5	1	4	97.9	35	135	3.9	45.0	19	1	0	0	957	6
Career		3	3	2–1	75	114	65.8	822	274.0	58	5	1	4	97.9	35	135	3.9	45.0	19	1	0	0	957	6

Awards

- 2024 Offensive Rookie of the Year (AP • PWFA • The Sporting News • Pepsi)
- 2024 Moment of the Year: Hail Maryland
- Pro Bowl (2024)
- NFC Offensive Player of the Week (2024: Week 3)
- Offensive Rookie of the Month (September 2024)
- NFL Top 100: 21st (2025)

Records

- Most wins in a season by a rookie quarterback: 14 (Note: 12 regular season and 2 playoff wins) (tied with Ben Roethlisberger)
- Season rushing yards by a rookie quarterback: 891
- Single-game completion percentage by a rookie: 91.3% (Note: Minimum of 20 attempts. Also a Commanders franchise record.)
- Most points per game by a rookie quarterback: 28.5
- Highest completion percentage in a rookie season: 69%
- Most touchdown passes in the fourth quarter or overtime in a rookie season: 12
- Most Rookie of the Week awards in a season: 11 (Note: Weeks 1, 3, 4, 5, 6, 8, 9, 13, 15, 16, and 17)
- Postseason passing yards by a rookie: 822
- Postseason passing touchdowns by a rookie: 5
- Postseason rushing yards by a rookie quarterback: 135

=== College ===
Legend
	Heisman Trophy
**Bold**	Career high

College statistics
Year	Team	Games		Passing								Rushing				Total	
Year	Team	GP	Record	Cmp	Att	%	Yds	Avg	TD	Int	Rtg	Car	Yds	Avg	TD	Yds	TD
2019	Arizona State	12	8–4	205	338	60.7	2,943	8.7	17	2	149.2	125	355	2.8	3	3,298	20
2020	Arizona State	4	2–2	49	84	58.3	701	8.3	5	1	145.7	33	223	6.8	4	924	9
2021	Arizona State	13	8–5	197	301	65.4	2,380	7.9	10	**10**	136.2	138	710	5.1	6	3,090	16
2022	LSU	14	**10–4**	**266**	**388**	68.6	2,913	7.5	17	3	144.5	**186**	885	4.8	**11**	3,798	28
2023	LSU	12	9–3	236	327	**72.2**	**3,812**	**11.7**	**40**	4	**208.0**	135	**1,134**	**8.4**	10	**4,946**	**50**
Career		55	37–18	953	1,438	66.3	12,749	8.9	89	20	158.4	617	3,307	5.4	34	16,056	123

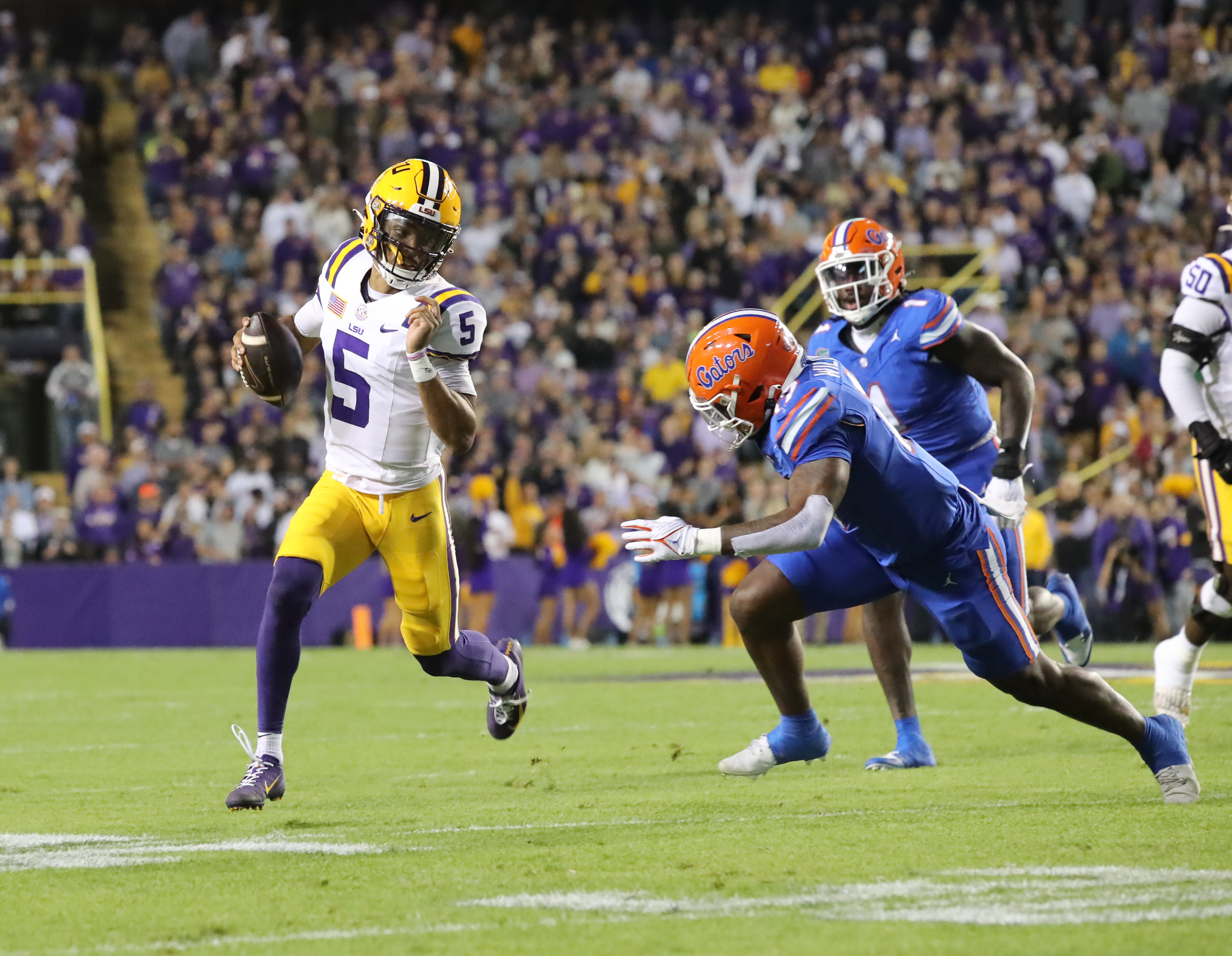
Daniels is the only college football player to pass for 350 yards and rush for 200 in the same game, doing so against the Florida Gators in 2023.

Awards

- Heisman Trophy (2023)
- Walter Camp Award (2023)
- AP College Football Player of the Year (2023)
- The Sporting News College Football Player of the Year (2023)
- Davey O'Brien Award (2023)
- Manning Award (2023)
- Johnny Unitas Golden Arm Award (2023)
- Consensus All-American (2023)
- SEC Male Athlete of the Year (2024)
- SEC Offensive Player of the Year (2023)
- Best College Athlete, Men's Sports (2024 ESPYs)
- All-SEC team (2023)
- 2022 LSU Tigers MVP (Note: Officially called the Charles McClendon Most Valuable Player Award)
- 2019 Sun Bowl MVP
- 7× SEC Offensive Player of the Week (Note: 2022 Week 8, 10; 2023 Week 3, 4, 6, 11, 12)
- 2× Pac-12 Offensive Player of the Week (Note: 2019 Week 13; 2021 Week 5)

Records

- FBS single-season passer rating record: 208.0 (2023)
- Only FBS player with 12,000 passing and 3,000 career rushing yards
- Only FBS player with 350 yards passing and 200 yards rushing in a game
- SEC single-game touchdowns: 8; tied with Joe Burrow (2023)
- SEC single-game total yards: 606 (2023)
- LSU career quarterback rushing yards: 2,019
- LSU single-season total yards: 4,946 (2023)
- LSU single-season quarterback rushing yards: 1,134 (2023)
- LSU single-season quarterback rushing touchdowns: 11 (2022)
- Arizona State freshman passing yards: 2,943 (2019)

== Personal life ==
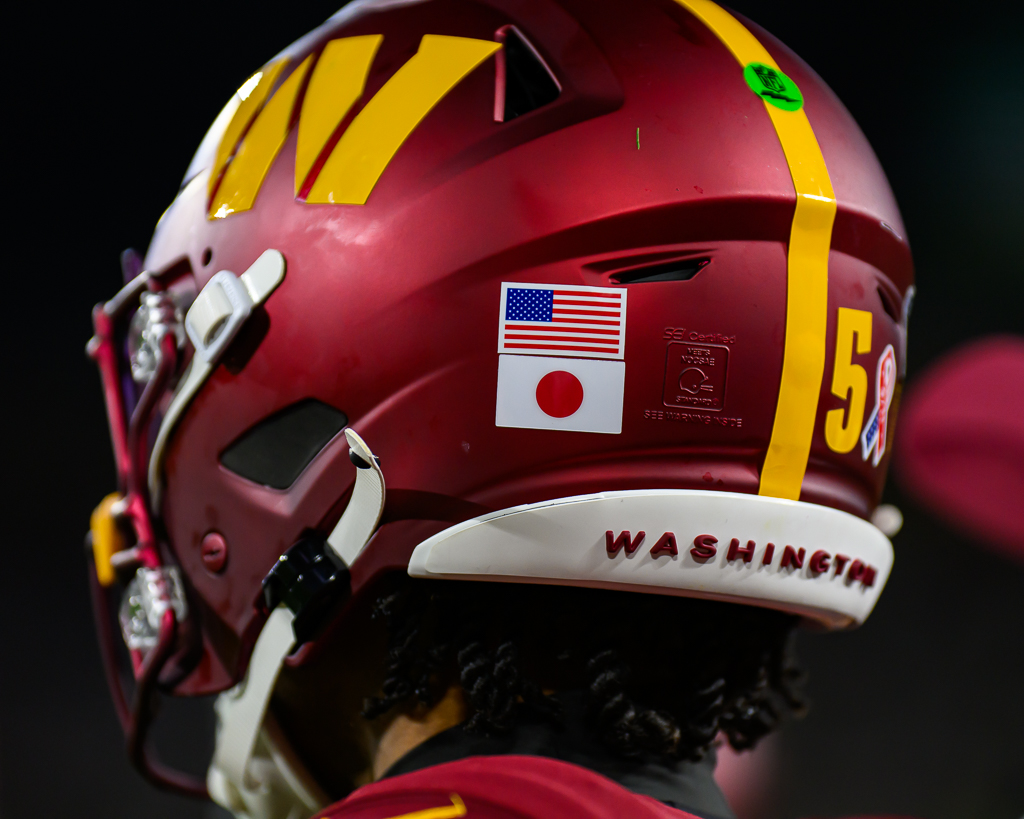
Daniels is of partial Japanese ancestry through his great-grandmother. He wears a Japanese flag helmet sticker to honor her.

Daniels was born to Javon "Jay" Daniels, a college football cornerback for the Washington Huskies and Iowa State Cyclones in the late 1990s, and Regina Jackson, who works as Daniels's business manager and agent. He has an older sister named Bianca. Daniels's paternal grandparents died of COVID-19 in early 2021. He was the first starting NFL quarterback with Japanese ancestry since Arthur Matsu in 1928, as his maternal great-grandmother emigrated from the country. He is Christian. He earned a degree in business communications from Arizona State in December 2021 and pursued a Master of Liberal Arts degree at LSU.

Daniels had college name, image, and likeness (NIL) deals with Raising Cane's, Powerade, Beats by Dre, and Urban Outfitters. He was featured on The Money Game: LSU, a six-part NIL-focused 2024 docuseries by Prime Video that followed him, Angel Reese, Flau'jae Johnson, Livvy Dunne, Alia Armstrong, and Trace Young through the LSU Tiger's 2023–24 sports season. In August 2026, Daniels sent a cease and desist letter to LSU in an effort to end their use of his likeness being used in marketing material following the school's decision to allow DJ Pickett to wear number 5 after a previous understanding that it would no longer be assigned. The decision spawned internet memes avoiding the use of 5 humorously out of respect for him.

Daniels was presented with a key to the city to San Bernardino on January 20, 2024, with mayor Helen Tran declaring the day "Jayden Daniels Day" and dedicating Cajon High School's football stadium after him. He was featured in the launch advertisement for Nike's Hyperboot recovery shoe in 2025. He presented the Best Play Award alongside Dunne and rapper Lil Wayne to quarterback Lamar Jackson at the 2024 ESPYs; Daniels also accepted the Best College Athlete, Men's Sports award at the event. Rookie trading cards of Daniels are sought by collectors, with his cards accounting for more overall evaluations in 2025 than any other athlete. He was featured on the third season of the Netflix documentary series Quarterback in 2026, along with Baker Mayfield, Cam Ward, and Joe Flacco.

=== Other sport activities ===
Daniels threw the ceremonial first pitch at a Washington Nationals baseball game in June 2024. He participated and finished 40th in the inaugural Fanatics Games in 2025, a tournament of eight skill games held during Fanatics Fest between 100 professional athletes, celebrities, and fans for $1 million. He also spoke on a guest panel with former NFL quarterbacks Joe Montana and Dan Marino and another with Commanders team owner Josh Harris at the same event. Daniels later participated in the 2026 Fanatics Flag Football Classic tournament in Los Angeles as co-captain of the Wildcats FFC along with Joe Burrow. The event, organized in part to promote flag football at the Summer Olympics, consisted of three five-on-five teams featuring other NFL players, members of the US national flag football team, and guest celebrities. Daniels and the Wildcats would finish as the runner-up to Team USA.
