= Cognilize =

German virtual reality software developer

Cognilize is a German virtual reality AI artificial intelligence software developer best known for creating sports training simulation systems. It gained recognition for developing applications to help train American football players such as Jayden Daniels. The company was founded in 2019 by Verena Krakau and Christian Hartmann originally for soccer training. They started work on American football applications in 2023 when they visited Louisiana State University (LSU), where the team worked in partnership with LSU Tigers athletic trainer Jack Marucci to help develop Daniels and other quarterbacks on their roster. Daniels cited the software as being an assistance to him winning the Heisman Trophy that year, with him continuing the practice professionally in the National Football League (NFL).
