= Joey Yellen =

American football player (born 1999)

Profile
- Position: Quarterback

Personal information
- Born: August 19, 1999 (age 27); Los Alamitos, California, U.S.
- Listed height: 6 ft 3 in (1.91 m)
- Listed weight: 210 lb (95 kg)

Career information
- High school: Mission Viejo (Mission Viejo, California)
- College: Arizona State (2019); Pittsburgh (2020–2021); Hawaii (2022–2023); Chapman (2024)
- Stats at ESPN

Joseph Michael Yellen (born August 19, 1999) is a former American college football quarterback. He previously played for the Arizona State Sun Devils, the Pittsburgh Panthers, the Hawaii Rainbow Warriors, and the Chapman Panthers.

== Early life ==
Yellen attended Mission Viejo High School in Mission Viejo, California, where he completed 360 of 595 pass attempts for 6,131 yards, 57 touchdowns and 14 interceptions. He was rated as a four-star recruit and committed to play college football at Arizona State University over offers from Brown, Georgia, Oregon State, San Jose State and Washington State.

== College career ==
=== Arizona State ===
In 2019, Yellen served as the Sun Devils' primary backup after losing a quarterback competition to fellow freshman Jayden Daniels in the offseason. His lone start was in substitution of an injured Daniels, throwing for 292 yards and four touchdowns in a loss to USC. With only appearing in one game, Yellen was ultimately redshirted.

On December 16, 2019, shortly after the season ended, Yellen announced that he would enter the NCAA transfer portal.

=== Pittsburgh ===
On January 2, 2020, Yellen announced that he transfer to Pittsburgh. In 2020, he played in six games as backup to Kenny Pickett. With Pickett injured, Yellen started back to back games in October against Miami and Notre Dame. Yellen threw for a season-high 277 yards and a touchdown in the loss against the Hurricanes. He finished the season with completing 35 of 78 passing attempts for 402 yards, three interceptions and a touchdown. In 2021, he played in only one game against New Hampshire.

On April 29, 2022, Yellen announced that he would enter the transfer portal for the second time.

=== Hawaii ===
On May 2, 2022, Yellen announced that he would transfer to Hawaii. Despite missing spring football, he competed for the starting job with Brayden Schager. He made his Rainbow Warriors debut off of the bench in the season opener against Vanderbilt. Yellen started the next three games against Western Kentucky, Michigan and Duquesne. On the 2022 season, he appeared in the first four games of the season and finished with completing 40 of 87 passing attempts for 324 yards and two interceptions. In 2023, he did not appear in any games.

On November 14, 2023, Yellen announced that he would enter the transfer portal.

=== Chapman ===
Yellen transferred to Chapman University who are D-III and members of the SCIAC. Yellen made his first appearance off of the bench for the Panthers where he completed 10 of 16 passes for 105 yards in a victory against Redlands. He started the following week against Cal Lutheran where he completed 18 of 28 passes for 205 yards and two touchdowns in the victory.

=== Statistics ===
Year	Team	Games			Passing								Rushing			
Year	Team	GP	GS	Record	Cmp	Att	Pct	Yds	Avg	TD	INT	Rtg	Att	Yds	Avg	TD
2019	Arizona State	1	1	0–1	28	44	63.6	292	6.6	4	2	140.3	1	−5	−5.0	0
2020	Pittsburgh	6	2	0–2	35	78	44.9	402	5.2	1	3	84.7	5	−45	−9.0	0
2021	Pittsburgh	1	0	—	0	0	0.0	0	0.0	0	0	0.0	0	0	0.0	0
2022	Hawaii	4	3	1–2	40	87	46.0	324	3.7	0	2	73.7	7	−45	−6.4	0
2023	Hawaii	DNP														
2024	Chapman	8	7	5–2	114	178	64.0	1,329	7.5	11	5	141.5	12	12	1.0	1
FBS career		12	6	1–5	103	209	49.3	1,018	4.9	5	7	91.4	13	−95	−7.3	0
D-III career		8	7	5–2	114	178	64.0	1,329	7.5	11	5	141.5	12	12	1.0	1
