= 2019 Sun Bowl =

Postseason college football bowl game

2019 Tony the Tiger Sun Bowl
- 86th Sun Bowl
Florida State Seminoles	Arizona State Sun Devils
(6–6)	(7–5)
ACC	Pac-12
14	20
Head coach: Odell Haggins (interim)	Head coach: Herm Edwards
	1	2	3	4	Total
Florida State	0	0	14	0	14
Arizona State	3	6	0	11	20
- Date: December 31, 2019
- Season: 2019
- Stadium: Sun Bowl
- Location: El Paso, Texas
- MVP: Jayden Daniels (QB, Arizona State)
- Favorite: Arizona State by 4.5
- Referee: Ron Snodgrass (Big Ten)
- Attendance: 42,412
- Payout: US$4,550,000

United States TV coverage
- Network: CBS
- Announcers: Brad Nessler (play-by-play); Gary Danielson (color commentator); Jamie Erdahl (sideline reporter); Gene Steratore (rules analyst)

The 2019 Sun Bowl was a college football bowl game played on December 31, 2019, with kickoff at 2:00 p.m. EST (12:00 p.m. local MST) on CBS. It was the 86th edition of the Sun Bowl, and was one of the 2019–20 bowl games concluding the 2019 FBS football season. Sponsored by Kellogg's Frosted Flakes breakfast cereal, the game was officially known as the Tony the Tiger Sun Bowl, after its mascot, Tony the Tiger.

== Teams ==
The game was played between the Arizona State Sun Devils from the Pac-12 Conference and the Florida State Seminoles from Atlantic Coast Conference (ACC). This was the fifth overall meeting and second postseason meeting between the programs; Florida State entered the game leading the all-time series, 3–1. Arizona State's lone victory in the series came in their home stadium in the inaugural Fiesta Bowl. The teams' most recent prior meeting was in 1984.

=== Arizona State Sun Devils ===
Arizona State entered the game with a 7–5 record (4–5 in conference). They finished tied for third place in the South Division of the Pac-12. The Sun Devils were 3–1 against ranked opponents, defeating Michigan State, California, and Oregon while losing to Utah. They started their season 5–1, then lost four in a row before finishing the regular season with two wins. This was Arizona State's seventh Sun Bowl; the Sun Devils are 3–2–1 in prior appearances.

=== Florida State Seminoles ===
Florida State entered the game with a 6–6 record (4–4 in conference). They finished in a three-way tie for third place in the ACC's Atlantic Division. The Seminoles lost to all three ranked teams they faced; Virginia, Clemson, and Florida. This was Florida State's third Sun Bowl; in their previous two appearances, their 1954 team lost the 1955 Sun Bowl to Texas Western (now UTEP), 37–14, and their 1966 team lost that season's Sun Bowl to Wyoming, 28–20.

== Game summary ==
2019 Tony the Tiger Sun Bowl

Quarter	1	2	3	4	Total
Florida State	0	0	14	0	14
Arizona State	3	6	0	11	20

at Sun Bowl • El Paso, Texas

- Date: Tuesday, December 31, 2019
- Game time: 2:00 p.m. EST (12:00 p.m. MST)
- Game weather: Mostly sunny • Temperature: 48 °F (9 °C) • Wind: S 5 mph
- Game attendance: 42,412
- Referee: Ron Snodgrass
- TV announcers (CBS): Brad Nessler (play-by-play), Gary Danielson (color) and Jamie Erdahl (sideline)
- ESPN game summary

Game information

First Quarter

- (3:57) ASU – Cristian Zendejas 40 yard field goal (Drive: 4 plays, –9 yards, 2:00; Arizona State 3–0)

Second Quarter

- (7:58) ASU – Cristian Zendejas 26 yard field goal (Drive: 8 plays, 84 yards, 3:37; Arizona State 6–0)
- (4:33) ASU – Cristian Zendejas 24 yard field goal (Drive: 7 plays, 44 yards, 2:03; Arizona State 9–0)

Third Quarter

- (3:17) FSU – Ontaria Wilson 3 yard rush, Ricky Aguayo kick (Drive: 11 plays, 91 yards, 3:46; Arizona State 9–7)
- (1:04) FSU – James Blackman 91 yard pass to Tamorrion Terry, Ricky Aguayo kick (Drive: 1 play, 91 yards, 0:13; Florida State 14–9)

Fourth Quarter

- (12:02) ASU – Cristian Zendejas 34 yard field goal (Drive: 12 plays, 59 yards, 4:02; Florida State 14–12)
- (10:06) ASU – Willie Harts 25 yard interception return, 2-point rush good (Arizona State 20–14)

=== Statistics ===
Statistics	FSU	ASU
First downs	21	13
Plays–yards	80–470	65–282
Rushes–yards	51–224	37–87
Passing yards	246	195
Passing: comp–att–int	16–29–4	12–28–0
Time of possession	31:04	28:56

Team	Category	Player	Statistics
Florida State	Passing	James Blackman	14/26, 244 yards, 1 TD, 4 INT
Florida State	Rushing	Deonte Sheffield	18 carries, 87 yards
Florida State	Receiving	Tamorrion Terry	9 receptions, 165 yards, 1 TD
Arizona State	Passing	Jayden Daniels	12/28, 195 yards
Arizona State	Rushing	Jayden Daniels	12 carries, 36 yards
Arizona State	Receiving	Kyle Williams	2 receptions, 76 yards
