= Under Armour All-America Game =

High school football all-star game

The Under Armour High School All-America Game is a high school football all-star game typically held in early January in the U.S. state of Florida created to spotlight the nation’s top high school seniors. The game was first played on January 5, 2008, and has been played annually at Tropicana Field in St. Petersburg, Florida or at Camping World Stadium in Orlando, Florida. The game is sponsored by Under Armour and enjoys a national audience thanks to broadcast partner ESPN (the first edition was broadcast on ABC opposite the U.S. Army All-American Bowl, and the 17th edition was broadcast on ESPN2 opposite the 2025 Sugar Bowl). The game is co-owned by Chicago-based sports marketing agency Intersport and ESPN.

== Player selection ==
National recruiting analysts and talent evaluators from ESPN Scouts, Inc., will select players for both team rosters. Eight of the top 10 ranked players in the ESPN 150 competed in the 2009 game. Because there are a number of All-America games concurrently, they are in competition for players. About 100 players are invited annually, with some having the opportunity to also participate in a televised skills competition and other ancillary events held at Disney's Wide World of Sports Complex in the days prior to the game. In addition, ESPNU televises the team practices.

As of 2019, 180 alumni of the Under Armour All-America Game had been selected in the NFL draft, including 47 first-round draft picks and 21 NFL Pro Bowlers.

== Notable alumni ==
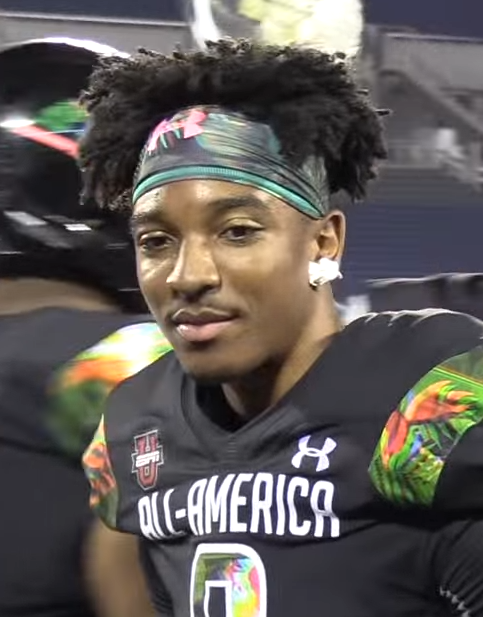
Quarterback Jayden Daniels played in the 2019 game and later won the 2023 Heisman Trophy

- A. J. Green (2008), All-Pro wide receiver
- Julio Jones (2008), All-Pro wide receiver
- Jadeveon Clowney (2011), selected first overall in the 2014 NFL draft
- Landon Collins (2012), All-Pro safety
- Jameis Winston (2012), quarterback and 2013 Heisman Trophy winner
- Myles Garrett (2014), All-Pro defensive end
- Kyler Murray (2015), quarterback and 2018 Heisman Trophy winner
- Minkah Fitzpatrick (2015), All-Pro cornerback
- Calvin Ridley (2015), All-Pro wide receiver
- Roquan Smith (2015), All-Pro linebacker
- Derwin James (2015), All-Pro safety
- Nick Bosa (2016), All-Pro defensive end
- A. J. Brown (2016), All-Pro wide receiver
- Xavier McKinney (2017), All-Pro safety
- A. J. Terrell (2017), All-Pro cornerback
- Ja'Marr Chase (2018), All-Pro wide receiver
- Kyle Pitts (2018), All-Pro tight end
- Nik Bonitto (2018), All-Pro linebacker
- Jayden Daniels (2019), quarterback and 2023 Heisman Trophy winner
- George Pickens (2019), All-Pro wide receiver
- Jalen Carter (2020), All-Pro defensive tackle

== Game results ==
Year	Date	Site	Winning team		Losing team	
2008	January 5	Disney WWOS - Orlando, Florida	Silver	17	Red	14
2009	January 4	Citrus Bowl - Orlando, Florida	White	27	Black	16
2010	January 2	Tropicana Field - St. Petersburg, Florida	Black	32	White	7
2011	January 5	Tropicana Field - St. Petersburg, Florida	Red	24	White	22
2012	January 5	Tropicana Field - St. Petersburg, Florida	White	49	Black	16
2013	January 4	Tropicana Field - St. Petersburg, Florida	Black	16	White	3
2014	January 2	Tropicana Field - St. Petersburg, Florida	Highlight	31	Nitro	21
2015	January 2	Tropicana Field - St. Petersburg, Florida	Highlight	46	Armour	6
2016	January 2	Orlando Citrus Bowl - Orlando, Florida	Highlight	27	Armour	0
2017	January 1	Camping World Stadium - Orlando, Florida	Armour	24	Highlight	21
2018	January 4	Camping World Stadium - Orlando, Florida	Highlight	23	Spotlight	21
2019	January 3	Camping World Stadium - Orlando, Florida	Ballaholics	28	Flash	27
2020	January 2	Camping World Stadium - Orlando, Florida	Pressure	30	Savage	24
2021	Cancelled due to the COVID-19 pandemic					
2022	January 2	Camping World Stadium - Orlando, Florida	Icons	23	Legends	17
2023	January 7	Camping World Stadium - Orlando, Florida	Phantom	14	Speed	7
2024	January 3	Camping World Stadium - Orlando, Florida	Ice	39	Fire	9
2025	January 2	Spec Martin Stadium - DeLand, Florida	Icon	31	Unstoppable	19
2026	January 3	Spec Martin Stadium - DeLand, Florida	Roses	23	Pearls	9
