= Tommy Hudson (American football) =

American football player (born 1997)

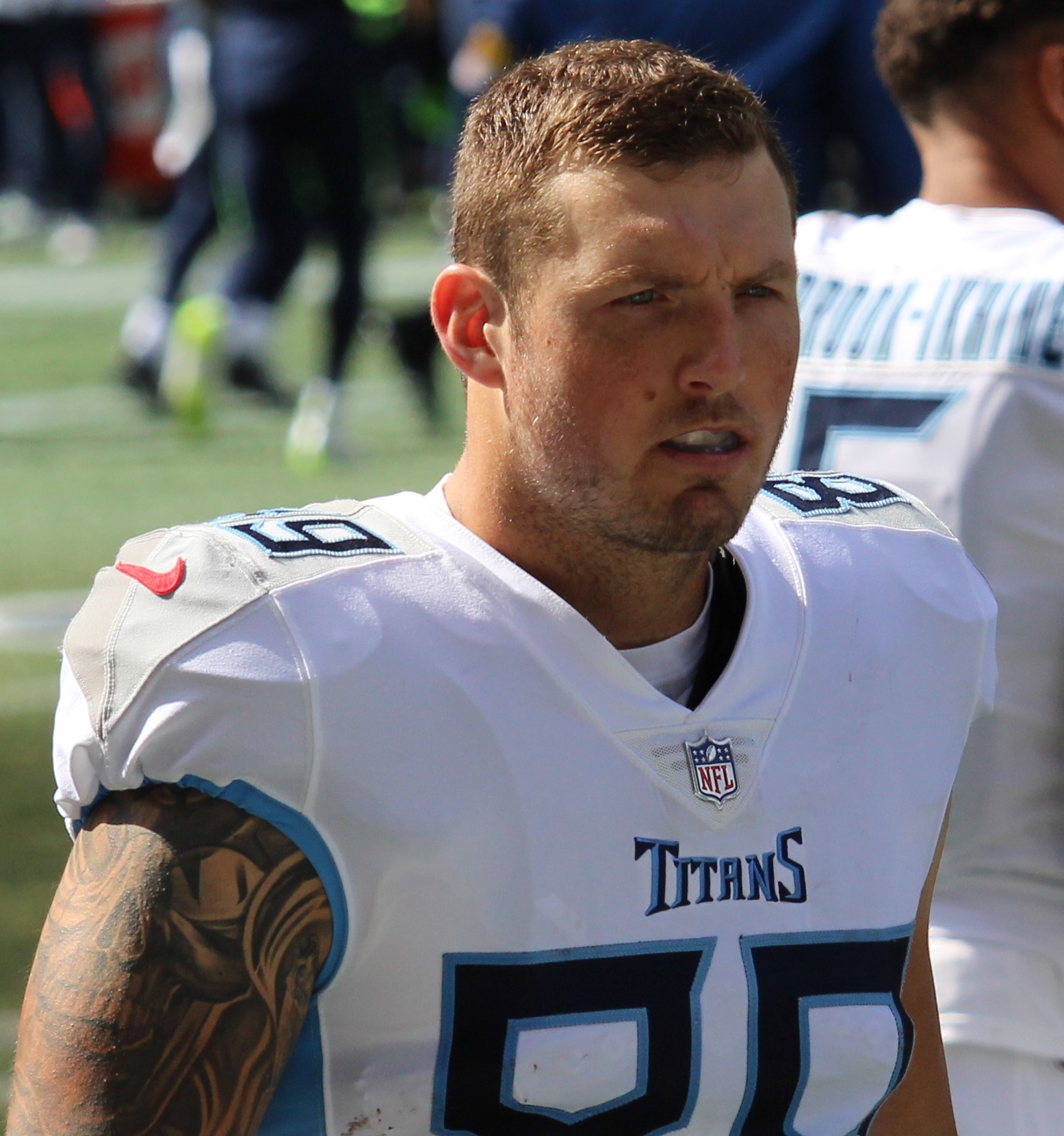
- Hudson with the Tennessee Titans in 2021

Profile
- Position: Tight end

Personal information
- Born: February 22, 1997 (age 29); San Jose, California, U.S.
- Listed height: 6 ft 5 in (1.96 m)
- Listed weight: 255 lb (116 kg)

Career information
- High school: Archbishop Mitty (San Jose, California)
- College: Arizona State
- NFL draft: 2020: undrafted

Career history
- Tennessee Titans (2020–2022); Denver Broncos (2023)*; New Orleans Saints (2023–2024)*
- * Offseason or practice squad member only

Career NFL statistics as of 2023
- Receptions: 3
- Receiving yards: 31
- Stats at Pro Football Reference

Thomas Eugene Hudson (born February 22, 1997) is an American football tight end. He played college football at Arizona State.

== College career ==
Hudson was a member of the Arizona State Sun Devils for five seasons, redshirting his true freshman season. Over the course of his collegiate career, Hudson played in 40 games with 26 starts and caught 25 passes for 205 yards.

== Professional career ==
Pre-draft measurables
Height	Weight
6 ft 5 1/8 in (1.96 m)	255 lb (116 kg)
Values from Pro Day

=== Tennessee Titans ===
Hudson signed with the Tennessee Titans as an undrafted free agent on May 4, 2020. He was waived at the end of training camp during final roster cuts on September 5, but was signed by to the team's practice squad the following day. On October 8, Hudson was suspended for six games for violating the NFL's policy on performance-enhancing substances. At the end of the season the Titans signed him to a reserve/futures contract.

Hudson was waived by the Titans on September 13, 2021, and re-signed to the practice squad. He was promoted to the active roster on September 24. He was placed on injured reserve on October 8. He was activated on November 20. He was placed back on injured reserve on December 11, ending his season.

On August 30, 2022, Hudson was waived/injured by the Titans and placed on injured reserve. He was released on October 4.

=== Denver Broncos ===
On June 1, 2023, Hudson signed with the Denver Broncos. He was waived by the Broncos on August 29.

=== New Orleans Saints ===
On September 4, 2023, Hudson was signed to the New Orleans Saints' practice squad. Following the end of the regular season, the Saints signed him to a reserve/future contract on January 8, 2024. On August 1, Hudson was waived with an injury designation and placed on injured reserve. He was then waived with an injury settlement on August 8.
