= Louisiana State University Laboratory School =

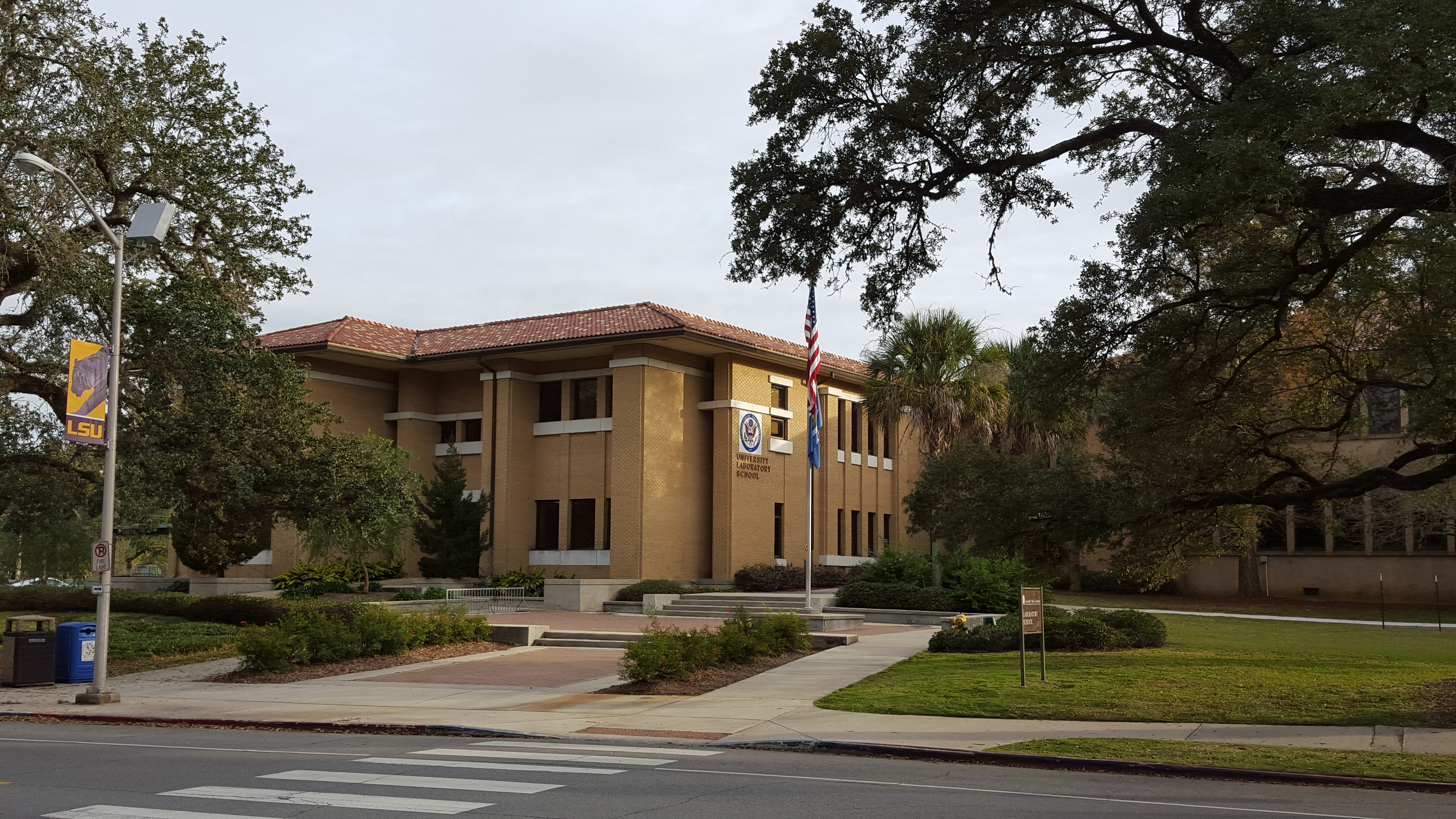

Location
- 45 Dalrymple Drive; Baton Rouge, Louisiana; United States; 30.4156188°N 91.17384779999998°W

Information
- Type: Public, lab school, College-prep
- Motto: Total effort in every endeavor
- Established: 1915
- Oversight: Louisiana State University
- NCES School ID: 220002201922
- Teaching staff: 126.07 (FTE)
- Grades: K–12
- Gender: Coeducational
- Enrollment: 1,515 (2023–2024)
- Student to teacher ratio: 12.02
- Colors: Black and Gold
- Mascot: Cubs
- Nickname: Cubs
- Accreditation: Southern Association of Colleges and Schools
- Yearbook: The Cub
- Website: www.uhigh.lsu.edu

Louisiana State University Laboratory School (U-High) is a laboratory school under Louisiana State University and is one of two laboratory schools in Baton Rouge. The other is Southern University Laboratory School (commonly known as "Southern Lab"), which is operated by Southern University on the north side of the city.

== History ==
The school was established by the College of Education, now known as the College of Human Sciences and Education, of Louisiana State University and has operated under its auspices for over 100 years. This coeducational school exists as an independent system to provide training opportunities for pre- and in-service teachers and to serve as a demonstration and educational research center. Since the school is part of the LSU system, students are required to pay tuition. The school is located on the main campus of Louisiana State University in Baton Rouge, a center for the petrochemical industry and a major deep-water port.

The school was designated a National Blue Ribbon School in 2015 and 2022.

== Athletics ==
U-High Lab athletics competes in the LHSAA.

=== Championships ===
Football championships

- (8) State Championships: 1957, 1974, 1988, 2013, 2014, 2017, 2018, 2021

== Notable alumni ==
- Richard Baker (Class of 1966), former member of the Louisiana House from East Baton Rouge parish from 1979 to 1987 (as a Democrat) and U.S. House of Representatives from Louisiana's 6th Congressional District from 1987 to 2008 (as a Republican)
- Bradford Banta, former NFL professional football player (Indianapolis Colts) and standout at USC
- Jordan Clark (Class of 2019), NFL professional football safety (New York Jets), previously at Arizona State and Notre Dame.
- Glen Davis (Class of 2004), former NBA professional basketball player
- Jimmy Field, Baton Rouge lawyer and member of the Louisiana Public Service Commission from 1996 to 2012
- Darryl Hamilton, former Major League Baseball player
- Brian Kinchen, former NFL professional football player and standout at LSU
- Doug Moreau (Class of 1962), former district attorney of East Baton Rouge Parish, Louisiana and former LSU football player
- Johnny Robinson (Class of 1956), former NFL professional football player (Kansas City Chiefs) and standout at LSU; 2021 Pro Football Hall of Fame inductee
- Steven Soderbergh, Hollywood director of several films including Ocean's Eleven
- Garrett Temple (Class of 2004), NBA player for the Toronto Raptors
