= List of Arizona State Sun Devils football players =

Arizona State University (ASU) has graduated a number of athletes. This includes graduates, non-graduate former students and current students of ASU who are notable for their achievements within athletics, sometimes before or after their time at ASU. Athletes in other sports can be found in the list of Arizona State University athletes; other alumni, including non-playing coaches and athletic administrators, can be found in the list of Arizona State University alumni.

ASU began playing football in 1896. As of 2024, ASU was tied for 31st among all NCAA universities with 255 alumni selected in the NFL draft. Six ASU alumni are enshrined in the Pro Football Hall of Fame: Eric Allen, Curley Culp, Mike Haynes, John Henry Johnson, Randall McDaniel and Charley Taylor. Nine players are in the College Football Hall of Fame: Bob Breunig, David Fulcher, Haynes, John Jefferson, McDaniel, Jake Plummer, Ron Pritchard, Pat Tillman and Danny White.

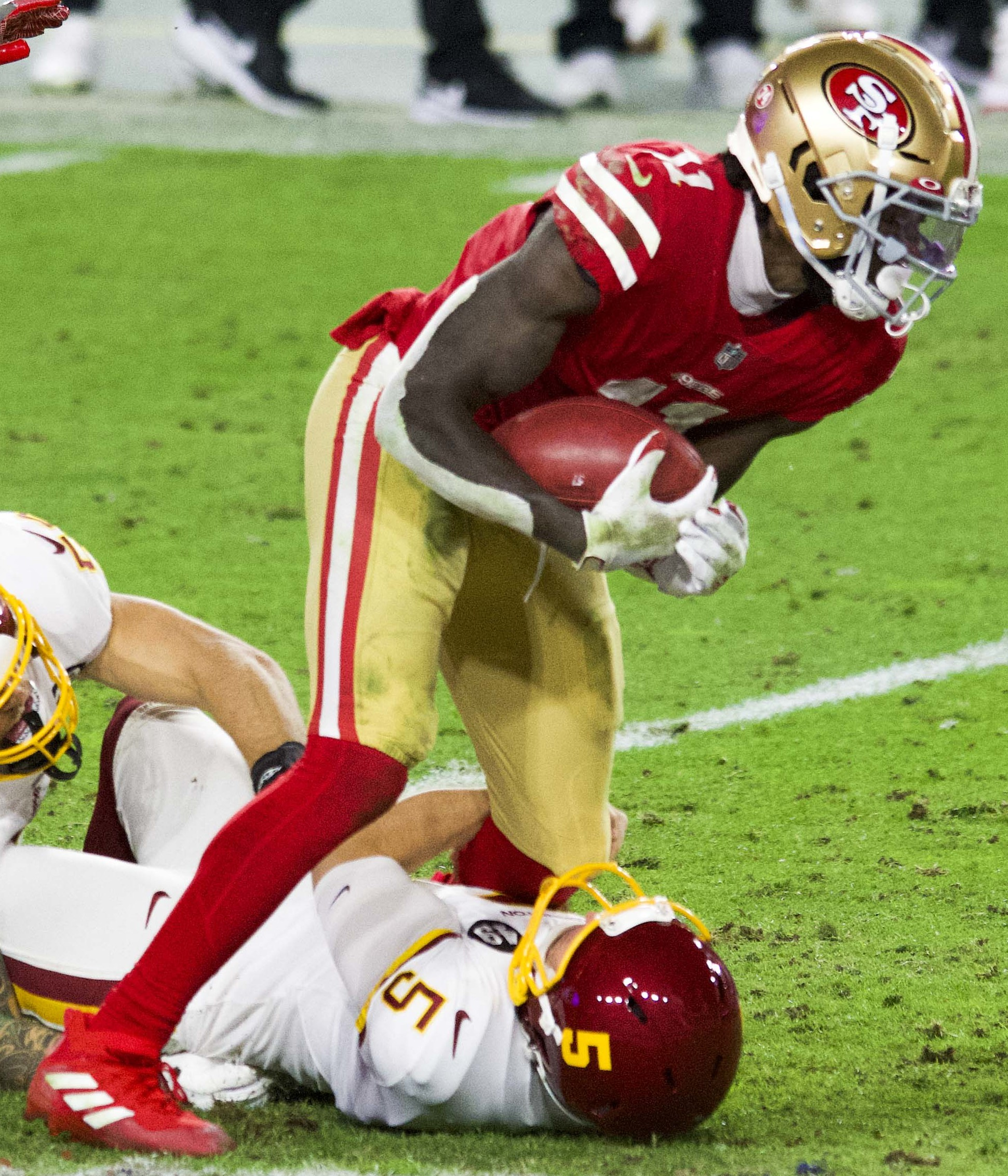
Brandon Aiyuk

Randall McDaniel

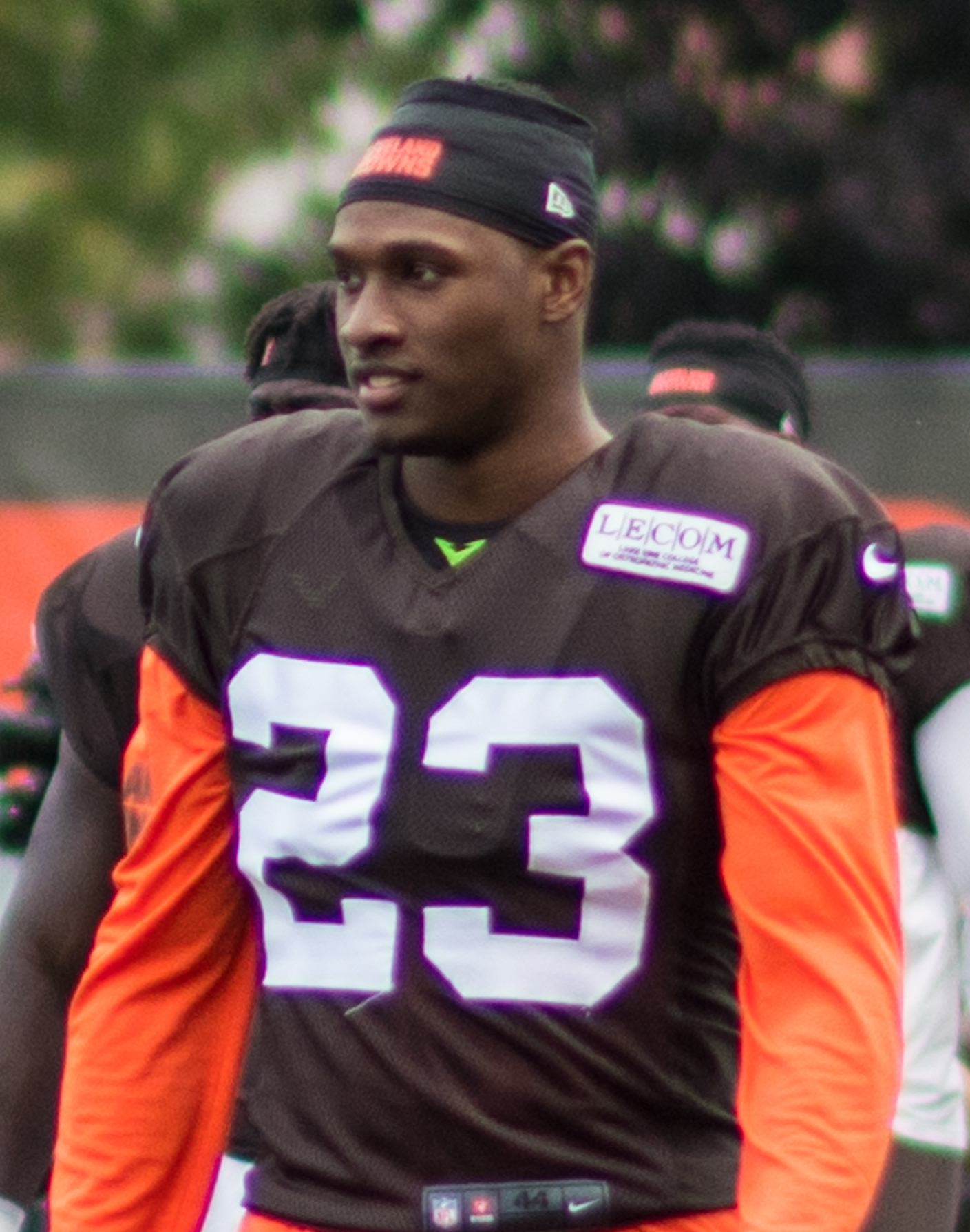
Damarious Randall

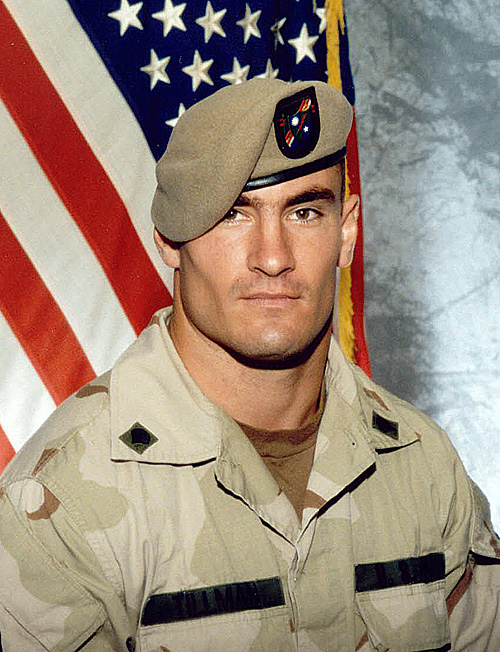
Pat Tillman

Football
Name	Years played at ASU	Notes	Ref.
Keith Abney II	2024–2025	Cornerback	
Junior Ah You	1970–1971	Played in the Canadian Football League (CFL)	
Brandon Aiyuk	2018–2019	Wide receiver; played in the NFL for the San Francisco 49ers	
Clifton Alapa	1972–1973		
Xavion Alford	2024–2025	Safety	
Eric Allen	1983–1987	Defensive back; played for 14 seasons in the NFL; in the Pro Football Hall of Fame	
Vince Amey	1994–1997	Defensive end; played in the NFL, 1998	
Kim Anderson	1978	Defensive back; played in the NFL, 1980–1984	
Max Anderson	1965–1967	Running back; played in the NFL, 1968–1969	
Ben Apuna	1978–1979	Linebacker; played in the NFL, 1980	
Adam Archuleta	1997–2000	Linebacker at ASU, safety for 7 seasons in the NFL	
Trace Armstrong	1984–1987	Defensive end; played in the NFL, 1989–2003	
Elijhah Badger	2020–2023	Wide receiver	
Quinn Bailey	2015–2018	Offensive lineman; played in the NFL, 2019–2023	
Jon Baker	1993–1994	Kicker; played in the NFL	
Kalen Ballage	2016–2017	Running back; played in the NFL, 2018–2021	
Blake Barnett	2017	Quarterback	
Josh Barrett	2004	Defensive back; played in the NFL, 2008-2011	
Mario Bates	1991–1993	Running back; played in the NFL, 1994–2000	
Solomon Bates	1999–2002	Linebacker; played in the NFL, 2003–2004	
Albrey Battle	1994–1998		
Greg Battle	1982–1985		
Jerry Bell	1978–1981	Tight end; played in the NFL, 1982-1986	
Eno Benjamin	2017–2019	Running back; played in the NFL, 2021–2022	
Grady Benton	1991–1993		
Mike Bercovici	2011–2015	Quarterback	
Mike Black	1982	Punter; played in the NFL, 1983–1987	
Omar Bolden	2007–2011	Cornerback; played in the NFL, 2012–2015	
John Bonds	1988–1989		
Trenton Bourguet	2019–2024	Quarterback	
Walt Bowyer	1980–1982	Defensive end; played in the NFL, 1983–1988	
Carl Bradford	2010–2013	Linebacker; played in the NFL, 2016	
Bob Breunig	1971–1975	Linebacker; played 10 seasons with the Dallas Cowboys; in the College Football Hall of Fame	
James Brooks	2007–2010		
Raleek Brown	2024–2025	Running back	
Ron Brown	1979–1982	Played football and track at ASU; wide receiver and defensive back; played in the NFL, 1984–1991	
Mike Brunson	1968–1969	Running back; played in the NFL, 1970	
Dave Buchanan	1968–1970		
Vontaze Burfict	2009–2011	Linebacker; played in the NFL, 2012–2019	
Rudy Burgess	2004, 2006–2007		
Leon Burton	1955–1958	Halfback; played with the Titans of New York of the American Football League, 1960	
Steve Bush	1992–1996	Tight end; played in the NFL, 1997–2005	
Darien Butler	2020-2021	Linebacker; played in the NFL, 2022	
Eddie Cade	1992–1994	Defensive back played in the NFL, 1995	
Bryan Caldwell	1979–1982	Defensive end; played in the NFL, 1984	
Rudy Carpenter	2006–2008	Quarterback; played in the NFL, 2011	
Deveron Carr	2008–2012	Cornerback; played in the NFL, 2013	
Henry Carr	1963	Defensive back; played in the NFL, 1965–1967	
Shante Carver	1990–1993	Defensive end; played for the Dallas Cowboys, 1994–1997	
Matt Cercone	1997–1998	Played in the NFL, 2000–2002	
Darryl Clack	1982–1985	Played in the NFL, 1986–1989	
Greg Clark	1984–1986	Linebacker; played in the NFL, 1988–1992	
Jordan Clark	2008–2012		
Cecil Coleman	1946–1949	ASU running backs coach, 1957–1958; athletic director at Fresno State, Wichita State and Illinois	
Davon Coleman	2011–2013	Defensive tackle; played in the NFL, 2014–2015 for the BC Lions	
Darren Comeaux	1980–1981	Linebacker; played in the NFL, 1982–1991	
Gannon Conway	2011–2013		
Jalin Conyers	2021–2023	Tight end	
Aaron Cox	1984–1987	Wide receiver; played in the NFL, 1988–1993	
Jordan Crook	2024–2025	Linebacker	
Aashari Crosswell	2018–2020		
Koron Crump	2016–2018		
Curley Culp	1965–1967	Defensive tackle and Pro Football Hall of Famer, played 14 seasons in the NFL; also wrestled at ASU, was the NCAA heavyweight wrestling champion in 1967	
Eddie Czaplicki	2021–2022	Punter	
Jayden Daniels	2019–2021	Quarterback; transferred to LSU and won the Heisman Trophy	
Alden Darby	2010, 2012–2013		
Frank Darby	2017–2020	Wide receiver; played in the NFL, 2021–2023	
DJ Davidson	2018–2021	Defensive lineman; played in the NFL for the New York Giants and Washington Commanders	
Dexter Davis	2006–2009	Defensive end/linebacker; played for the Seattle Seahawks, 2010–2011	
Jerone Davison	1991–1992	Running back; played in the NFL, 1996–1997	
Chris DeFrance	1978	Wide receiver; played in the NFL, 1979	
Calvin Demery	1969, 1971	Wide receiver; played in the NFL, 1972	
Kellen Diesch	2020–2021		
David Dixon	1990–1991	Guard; played in the NFL, 1994–2004	
Jamil Douglas	2010, 2012–2014	Guard; played in the NFL, 2015–2021	
Oscar Dragon	1969–1971	Running back; played in the NFL, 1972	
Mark Duckens	1987	Defensive end and tackle; played in the NFL, 1989–1992	
Ken Dyer	1964–1967	Defensive back and wide receiver	
Nijrell Eason	1999–2000	Defensive back; played in the NFL, 2002	
Chris Edmonds	2022–2023	Defensive back	
Eddie Elder	2010–2011		
Monroe Eley	1970	Running back; played in the NFL, 1975–1977	
Bill Elko	1979	Defensive lineman	
Keyshaun Elliott	2024–2025	Linebacker	
Paul Fanaika	2006–2008	Guard; played in the NFL, 2011–2014	
Mike Fanucci	1968–1970	Defensive end; played in the NFL, 1972–1974	
Ryan Ficken	1998–1999	Wide receiver, assistant coach at UCLA and in the NFL	
Floyd Fields	1987–1990	Defensive back; played in the NFL, 1991–1993	
Ed Fisher	1969–1971	Guard, center, defensive end; played in the NFL, 1974–1982	
George Flint	1960–1961	Guard; played in the NFL, 1962–1968	
Erik Flowers	1998–1999	Defensive end and linebacker; played in the NFL, 2000–2004	
D. J. Foster	2012–2015	Running back; played in the NFL, 2016–2020	
Gene Foster	1962–1964	Running back; played in the NFL, 1965–1970	
Mitchell Fraboni	2014–2017	Longsnapper; played in the NFL	
David Fulcher	1983–1985	Safety; three-time NFL All-Pro; in the College Football Hall of Fame	
Duane Galloway	1981–1982	Defensive back; played in the NFL, 1985–1987	
Mark Gastineau	1976	Defensive end; played half the season before leaving the team; played in the NFL, 1979–1988	
Eric Gentry	2021		
Garth Gerhart	2007–2011	Center; played in the NFL, 2014	
Travis Goethel	2006–2009	Linebacker; played in the NFL, 2010–2012	
Jesús Gómez	2024	Kicker	
Zane Gonzalez	2013–2016	Kicker; played in the NFL	
Larry Gordon	1973–1975	Linebacker; played for the Miami Dolphins, 1976–1982	
Dave Grannell	1972–1973	Tight end; played in the NFL, 1974	
B. J. Green	2021–2023	Defensive lineman	
Woody Green	1971–1973	Running back; ASU's first consensus All-American; played in the NFL, 1974–1976	
Marion Grice	2012–2013	Running back; played in the NFL, 2014	
Eric Guliford	1988–1992	Wide receiver; played in the NFL, 2013–2018	
Lawrence Guy	2008–2010	Defensive tackle; played in the NFL	
Matt Haack	2013–2016	Punter; played in the NFL	
Derek Hagan	2002–2005	Wide receiver; played eight seasons in the NFL	
Windlan Hall	1969–1971	Defensive back; played in the NFL, 1972–1977	
Marcus Hardison	2013–2014		
Bruce Hardy	1974–1977	Tight end; played 12 seasons for the Miami Dolphins	
Al Harris	1975–1978	Defensive end; played in the NFL, 1979–1990	
Darryl Harris	1984–1987	Running back; played in the NFL, 1988	
John Harris	1975–1977	Defensive player; played in the NFL, 1978–1988	
Herm Harrison	1960–1963		
N'Keal Harry	2016–2018	Wide receiver; played in the NFL for the Chicago Bears, New England Patriots and Minnesota Vikings	
Ben Hawkins	1963–1965	Wide receiver and defensive end; first-ever first-team All-American from ASU; played in the NFL, 1966–1974	
Gump Hayes	2015–2016	Cornerback; played in the CFL, 2019–2021	
Mike Haynes	1972–1976	Cornerback; College and Pro Football Hall of Famer; played in the NFL, 1976–1989	
Jackson He	2020	First Chinese-born player to score a touchdown in FBS college football	
Todd Heap	1998–2000	Tight end; played 12 seasons for the Arizona Cardinals and Baltimore Ravens	
John Helton	1966–1968		
Larry Hendershot	1964–1966	Linebacker; played in the NFL, 1967	
LaDarius Henderson	2019–2022		
Bernard Henry	1979–1981	Wide receiver; played in the NFL, 1982–1987	
Mark Hicks	1980–1982	Linebacker; played in the NFL, 1983 and 1987	
Bruce Hill	1982–1986		
J. D. Hill	1967–1968, 1970	Wide receiver; played in the NFL for the Buffalo Bills and Detroit Lions, 1971–1977	
Tommi Hill	2021	Defensive back	
Drew Hodgdon	2000–2004	Center; played in the NFL, 2005–2007	
Curtis Hodges	2017–2021		
Steve Holden	1969–1972	Wingback and punt returner; played in the NFL, 1973–1977	
Des Holmes	2022	Offensive lineman	
Todd Hons	1981–1983	Quarterback; played in the NFL, 1987	
James Hood	1981–1983		
Fair Hooker	1966–1968	Wide receiver; played in the NFL, 1969–1974	
Melvin Hoover	1978–1980	Wide receiver; played in the NFL, 1982–1987	
Tommy Hudson	2016–2019	Tight end; played in the NFL, 2021	
Max Iheanachor	2023–2025	Offensive tackle	
Junior Ioane	1998–1999	Defensive tackle; played in the NFL, 2001–2005	
Lenzie Jackson	1995–1998	Wide receiver; played in the NFL, 1999–2001	
Reggie Jackson	1965	Also played baseball at ASU	
Lynn James	1988–1989	Wide receiver; played in the NFL, 1990–1991	
Robert James	2004, 2006–2007	Linebacker; played in the NFL, 2009–2013	
John Jankans	1952–1955	Tackle and guard	
Jim Jeffcoat	1979–1982	Defensive end; played for the Dallas Cowboys and the Buffalo Bills, 1983–1997	
John Jefferson	1974–1977	Wide receiver, consensus All-American in 1977; in the College Football Hall of Fame; played in the NFL, 1978–1985	
Brian Jennings	1995, 1998–1999	Tight end and center; played in the NFL, 2000–2012	
Camron Johnson	2022	Wide receiver	
Glenn Johnson	1940–1941, 1947	In between his two stints, became a B-17 pilot in the United States Air Force during World War II	
John Henry Johnson	1952	Offensive and defensive back; played professionally in Canada and then the NFL and AFL (1954–1966); Pro Football Hall of Famer	
Keelan Johnson	2008–2012	Strong safety; played in the NFL, 2013	
Mike Johnson	1985–1986	Played in the Canadian Football League, became a coach	
Emory Jones	2022	Quarterback	
Jack Jones	2019–2021	Defensive back; played in the NFL for the New England Patriots and Las Vegas Raiders	
Levi Jones	1998–2001	Offensive lineman; played eight seasons in the NFL	
Sam Jones	2015–2017	Offensive guard; played in the NFL, 2018	
Paul Justin	1986–1990	Quarterback; played in the NFL, 1995–1999, and for the Arizona Rattlers in the Arena Football League	
Bill Kajikawa	1936	After graduating in 1937, coached football, baseball and basketball at ASU	
Todd Kalis	1983	Guard; played in the NFL, 1988–1995	
Mike Karney	2000–2003	Fullback; played in the NFL, 2004-2010	
Kani Kauahi	1978–1979	Center; played in the NFL, 1982–1993	
Khaylan Kearse-Thomas	2015, 2017–2019		
Sam Keller	2006		
Taylor Kelly	2010–2014	Quarterback	
Larry Kentera	1947–1949	Assistant football coach at ASU, 1967–1978; later the head football coach at Northern Arizona University	
Don Kern	1982–1983	Tight end; played in the NFL, 1985–1986	
Kyle Kingsbury	2004	Mixed martial artist in the UFC	
Bob Kohrs	1976–1979	Defensive lineman; played in the NFL, 1981–1985	
Kyle Kosier	1997–2001	Guard; played in the NFL, 2002–2011	
Jeff Krohn	2000–2001	Quarterback	
Jason Kyle	1992–1994	Outside linebacker; played in the NFL, 1995–2010	
Jeff Kysar	1990–1994	Tackle; played in the NFL, 1995	
Kit Lathrop	1976–1977	Defensive end and nose tackle; played in the NFL, 1979–1987	
Shawn Lauvao	2006–2009	Guard; played in the NFL, 2010–2018	
Sam Leavitt	2024–2025	Quarterback	
Bob Lee	1964	Quarterback; played in the NFL, 1969–1980	
LeQuan Lewis	2009–2010	Cornerback; played in the NFL, 2012–2014	
Victor Leyva	1997–2000	Guard; played in the NFL, 2002	
Tony Lombardi	1981–1984		
Tony Lorick	1961–1963	Fullback and linebacker; played in the NFL, 1964–1969	
Ron Lou	1970–1972	Center; played in the NFL, 1973–1976	
Chase Lucas	2017–2021	Defensive back; played in the NFL, 2022–2023	
Devin Lucien	2015		
Bob Lueck	1963–1965		
Joey Lumpkin	1979–1981	Linebacker; played in the NFL, 1982–1983	
Brandon Magee	2008–2012	Outside linebacker; played in the NFL, 2013–2014	
Dashaun Mallory	2023	Defensive tackle	
Art Malone	1967–1969	Fullback; played seven seasons in the NFL	
Benny Malone	1971–1973	Running back; played in the NFL, 1974–1979	
Mark Malone	1977–1979	Quarterback; played in the NFL, 1980–1989	
Richard Mann	1965–1968	ASU receivers coach, 1974–1979	
Dick Mansperger	1956–1957	Assistant coach at ASU, 1958 and 1962; NFL executive	
Mike Marquardt	2006–2007		
Cameron Marshall	2009–2012		
Joe Matesic	1951	Tackle, played under his brother's name at ASU; played in the NFL, 1954	
Vernon Maxwell	1979–1982	Linebacker; played in the NFL, 1983–1989	
Alton McCaskill	2024	Running back	
Malik McClain	2024–2025	Wide receiver	
Brent McClanahan	1970–1972	Running back; played in the NFL, 1973–1979	
Skip McClendon	1985–1986	Defensive end; played in the NFL, 1987–1993	
Prentice McCray	1970–1972	Defensive back; played in the NFL, 1974–1980	
Randall McDaniel	1984–1987	Guard; College and Pro Football Hall of Famer; played in the NFL, 1988-2001	
Shaun McDonald	2000–2002	Wide receiver; played in the NFL, 2003–2009	
Chris McGaha	2006–2009		
Garrick McGee	1991–1992		
Lenny McGill	1989–1993	Defensive back; played in the NFL, 1994–1998	
Jeff McIntyre	1978	Linebacker; played in the NFL, 1979–1980	
Chris McKenzie	2003–2004	Defensive back; played in the NFL, 2005	
Hugh McKinnis	1968–1969	Running back; played in the NFL, 1973–1976	
Chamon Metayer	2024–2025	Tight end	
Jamal Miles	2009–2012		
Seth Miller	1967–1969		
Zach Miller	2004–2006	Consensus All-American in 2006; played eight seasons in the NFL	
Kevin Miniefield	1988–1992	Defensive back; played in the NFL, 1993–1997	
John Mistler	1977-1980	Wide receiver; played four seasons in the NFL	
Gene Mitcham	1952, 1955–1956	End; played in the NFL, 1958	
Alvin Moore	1982	Running back; played in the NFL, 1983–1987	
Fred Mortensen	1972, 1976–1977	Played in the USFL	
Christopher Mott		Center; English lecturer at UCLA	
Paul Moyer	1982	Defensive back; played in the NFL, 1983–1989	
Nick Murphy	1999–2001	Punter; played in the NFL, 2004–2005	
Dimitri Nance	2006–2009	Running back; played in the NFL, 2010	
Robert Nelson	2012–2013	Free safety; played in the NFL, 2014–2017	
Craig Newsome	1993–1994	Defensive back; played in the NFL, 1995–1999	
Brian Noble	1983–1984	Linebacker; played for the Green Bay Packers, 1985–1993	
Troy Nolan	2006–2008	Defensive back; played in the NFL, 2010–2012	
Omarr Norman-Lott	2021–2022	Defensive tackle	
Troy Omeire	2024	Wide receiver	
Al Onofrio	1941–1942	Assistant coach at Arizona State (1946–1957) and Missouri (1958–1970); head coach at Missouri, 1971–1977	
Kareem Orr	2015–2016	Cornerback; played in the NFL, 2019–2021	
Brock Osweiler	2009–2011	Quarterback; played in the NFL, 2012–2018	
Morris Owens	1972–1974	Wide receiver; played in the NFL, 1975–1979	
Gary Padjen	1977–1979	Linebacker; played in the NFL, 1982–1987	
Mike Pagel	1978–1982	Quarterback, also played baseball at ASU; played in the NFL, 1982–1993	
Anthony Parker	1984–1987	Defensive back; played in the NFL, 1989–1998	
Shawn Patterson	1983-1987	Defensive end and nose tackle; played in the NFL, 1988–1993	
Jeff Paulk	1994-1998	Fullback; played in the NFL, 1999–2000	
Ricky Pearsall	2019–2021	Wide receiver; played in the NFL for the San Francisco 49ers	
Mike Pennel	2012	Defensive tackle; played in the NFL	
Bruce Perkins	1988–1989	Running back; played in the NFL, 1990–1991	
T. J. Pesefea	2020–2022		
Scott Peters	1998–2001	Center and guard; played in the NFL, 2003	
Mike Phair	1990–1992	Coach and scout in the NFL, CFL and Japan's X-League	
John Pitts	1965–1966	Defensive back; played in the NFL, 1967–1975	
Jake Plummer	1993-1996	Quarterback	
Mike Pollak	2004, 2006–2007	Center; played in the NFL, 2008–2014	
Keith Poole	1992–1996	Wide receiver; played in the NFL, 1997–2001	
Paul Powell	1967–1969	Defensive back and placekicker; also played baseball at ASU and played pro baseball	
Ron Pritchard	1966–1968	Linebacker; first ASU football player to make three All-American football teams; in the College Football Hall of Fame	
Bryan Proby	1993	Defensive tackle; played in the NFL, 1995	
Earl Putman	1956	Center; played in the NFL, 1957, and coached high school football for 25 years	
Nick Ralston	2015–2018	Fullback; played in the NFL, 2021	
Damarious Randall	2013–2014	Free safety; played in the NFL, 2015–2020	
Lenny Randle	1968–1970	Return specialist; also played baseball at ASU and played pro baseball	
Jaden Rashada	2023	Quarterback	
Roman Rashada	2023	Defensive back	
J. R. Redmond	1996–1999	Running back; played in the NFL, 2000–2004	
Bryan Reeves	1988	Played in the NFL, 1994–1995	
Demario Richard	2014–2017	Running back	
Damien Richardson	1994–1997	Defensive back; played in the NFL, 1998–2002	
Mike Richardson	1979–1982	Defensive back; played in the NFL, 1983–1989	
Gerald Riggs	1978–1981	Running back; played in the NFL, 1982–1991	
Dale Robinson	2004–2005	Linebacker	
Gerell Robinson	2008–2011	Wide receiver; played in the NFL	
Hank Rockwell		Played professionally for the Cleveland Rams and Los Angeles Dons	
Derrick Rodgers	1996	Defensive lineman; played eight seasons in the NFL	
Juan Roque	1994–1996	Offensive tackle, consensus All-American; played two seasons in the NFL	
Rashad Ross	2011–2012	Wide receiver; played in the NFL, 2014–2016	
Grey Ruegamer	1995–1999	Offensive lineman; played nine seasons in the NFL	
Brandon Ruiz	2017–2018	Kicker	
Leonard Russell	1990	Running back; played in the NFL, 1991–1996	
Dan Saleaumua	1982–1986	Defensive end, defensive tackle, nose tackle; played in the NFL, 1997–1998	
Christian Sam	2014–2017		
Chip Sarafin	2011–2012, 2014	First active Division I player to come out as gay	
Brice Schwab	2010–2012		
Travis Scott	2000-2001		
John Seedborg	1961–1963	Punter; played in the NFL in 1965	
Rick Shaw	1966–1967	Played professionally in Canada	
Jason Shivers	2001–2003	Played in the NFL, 2004, and in NFL Europe and the CFL	
Nesta Jade Silvera	2022	Defensive lineman; played in the NFL	
Jason Simmons	1994–1997	Defensive back; played 10 seasons in the NFL	
Jeff Sims	2024–2025	Quarterback	
Cam Skattebo	2023–2024	Running back	
Brandon Smith	2006–2010	Cornerback; played in the NFL, 2013	
Derek Smith	1995–1996	Linebacker; played in the NFL, 1997–2008	
Gordon Smith	1957	Tight end; played in the NFL, 1961–1965, and coached at Arkansas and Iowa State	
Jake Smith	2024	Wide receiver	
Jerry Smith	1963–1964	Tight end; played in the NFL, 1965–1977	
Marvel Smith	1997–1999	Offensive lineman; played in the NFL for the Pittsburgh Steelers, 2000–2008	
Terrelle Smith	1997–1999	Fullback; played in the NFL, 2000–2009	
Phillippi Sparks	1990–1991	Cornerback and kickoff returner; played in the NFL, 1992–2000	
Dennis Sproul	1974–1977	Quarterback; played in the NFL, 1978	
Jeremy Staat	1996–1997	Defensive end; played in the NFL, 1998–2003	
Israel Stanley	1988–1992	Defensive lineman; played in the NFL, NFL Europe and Arena Football League	
Scott Stephen	1982–1986	Linebacker; played in the NFL, 1987–1992	
Jaelen Strong	2013–2014	Wide receiver; played in the NFL, 2015–2017	
Terrell Suggs	2000–2002	Defensive lineman, won the Bronko Nagurski Trophy and Lombardi Award while at ASU; consensus All-American; played in the NFL, 2003–2019	
Will Sutton	2009–2013	Defensive tackle; played three seasons in the NFL	
Shawn Swayda	1992–1996	Defensive end; played in the NFL, 1998–2001	
Messiah Swinson	2022–2023	Tight end	
Charley Taylor	1960–1963	Halfback; played in the NFL as a wide receiver, 1964-1977; Pro Football Hall of Famer	
Kerry Taylor	2007–2010	Wide receiver; played in the NFL, 2013	
J. T. Thomas	1993	Wide receiver; played for the St. Louis Rams, 1995–1998	
Kevin Thomas	1982–1986	Center; played in the NFL, 1988	
Bryan Thompson	2021–2022		
Steven Threet	2010	Quarterback	
Pat Tillman	1994–1997	Defensive lineman; played four seasons with the Arizona Cardinals; U.S. Army Ranger, died 2004	
Larry Todd	1962, 1964	Running back; played in the NFL, 1965–1970	
Ryan Torain	2006–2007	Running back; played in the NFL, 2008–2012	
Chip Trayanum	2020–2021	Running back	
Stephen Trejo	1996–2000	Running back; played in the NFL, 2001–2004	
Justin Tryon	2006–2007	Defensive back; played in the NFL, 2008-2012	
Casey Tucker	2018	Tackle; played in the NFL, 2021	
Michael Turk	2019–2020	Punter	
Jordyn Tyson	2024–2025	Wide receiver	
Mason Unck	1999–2002	Lienbacker; played in the NFL, 2003–2006	
Xazavian Valladay	2022	Running back; played for the New York Jets	
Jeff Van Raaphorst	1983–1987	Quarterback	
Luis Vasquez	2007–2008		
Jimmy Verdon	2000–2004	Defensive tackle; played in the NFL, 2005	
Danny Villa	1983–1986	Offensive lineman, consensus All-American	
Scott Von der Ahe	1995–1996	Linebacker; played in the NFL, 1997	
Brett Wallerstedt	1988–1992	Linebacker; played four seasons in the NFL	
Andrew Walter	2001–2004	Quarterback; played five seasons in the NFL	
Larry Walton	1967–1968	Wide receiver; played in the NFL, 1969–1978	
Jim Warne	1984–1986	Tackle; played in the NFL, 1987	
Mark Washington	2003	Linebacker; played in the NFL, 2007	
Robert Weathers	1979–1981	Running back; played in the NFL, 1982–1986	
Thomas Weber	2007–2010	Kicker; won the Lou Groza Award in 2007	
Dohnovan West	2019–2021		
Christian Westerman	2013–2015	Offensive guard; played in the NFL, 2017-2018	
Ron Wetzel	1980–1982	Tight end; played in the NFL, 1983	
Brady White	2015–2017	Quarterback; ASU assistant coach since 2024	
Danny White	1971–1973	Quarterback; College Football Hall of Fame member; played in the NFL, 1987–1998; coached in the Arena Football League for 16 years	
Rachaad White	2020–2021	Running back; played in the NFL for the Tampa Bay Buccaneers	
Tim White	2015–2016	Wide receiver; played in the NFL, 2018, and in the CFL	
Wilford "Whizzer" White	1947–1950	First All-American named from ASU; running back for the Chicago Bears	
Paul Widmer	1955–1958	Coached at Mesa Community College in the 1970s	
Manny Wilkins	2015–2018	Quarterback	
Freddie Williams	1973–1976	Running back	
Jamar Williams	2002–2004	Outside linebacker; played in the NFL, 2006–2010	
Kendall Williams	1979–1981	Cornerback; played in the NFL, 1983	
Kobe Williams	2017–2019	Defensive back; played in the CFL	
Kyle Williams	2006–2009	Wide receiver; played in the NFL, 2010-2013	
Newton Williams	1978–1981	Running back; played in the NFL, 1982-1983	
Travis Williams	1965–1966	Running back; played in the NFL, 1967–1971	
Darren Willis	1983–1986		
Johnny Wilson	2020–2021	Wide receiver; played in the NFL	
Kamari Wilson	2024	Strong safety	
Ed Woods	2020–2023	Cornerback	
Darren Woodson	1989–1991	safety for the Dallas Cowboys, 1992–2003	
Renell Wren	2015–2018	Defensive lineman; played in the NFL, 2019-2022	
Joey Yellen	2019	Quarterback	
Cristian Zendejas	2019–2021	Kicker	
Luis Zendejas	1981–1984	Kicker in the NFL, USFL and Arena Football League	
Joe Zuger	1959–1961	Quarterback; played in the Canadian Football League	
Rick Zumwalt	1986–1987	Linebacker	
