= 2020 Arizona State Sun Devils football team =

American college football season

2020 Arizona State Sun Devils football
- Conference: Pac-12 Conference
- South Division
- Record: 2–2 (2–2 Pac-12)
- Head coach: Herm Edwards (3rd season)
- Offensive coordinator: Zak Hill (1st season)
- Offensive scheme: Spread
- Co-defensive coordinators: Marvin Lewis (1st season); Antonio Pierce (1st season)
- Base defense: 4–3
- Home stadium: Sun Devil Stadium

Uniform
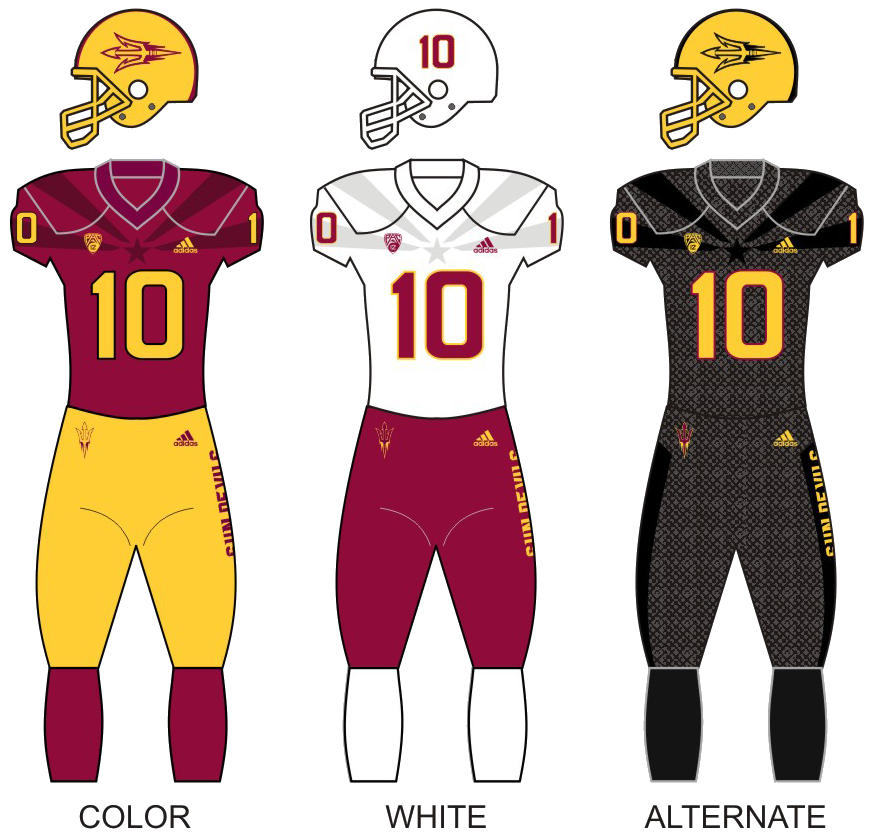

2020 Pac-12 Conference football standings
	Conf.			Overall
Team	W		L	W		L
North Division
Washington x	3	–	1	3	–	1
Oregon y$	3	–	2	4	–	3
Stanford	4	–	2	4	–	2
California	1	–	3	1	–	3
Washington State	1	–	3	1	–	3
Oregon State	2	–	5	2	–	5
South Division
No. 21 USC xy	5	–	0	5	–	1
Colorado	3	–	1	4	–	2
Utah	3	–	2	3	–	2
Arizona State	2	–	2	2	–	2
UCLA	3	–	4	3	–	4
Arizona	0	–	5	0	–	5
Championship: Oregon 31, USC 24
$ – Conference champion; x – Division champion/co-champions; y – Championship game participant; Note: Due to COVID-19, the Pac-12 suspended the season on August 11, but later decided to begin play on November 6. In addition to the title game on December 18, the conference seeded all remaining teams for a game during that weekend.; Rankings from AP Poll.

The 2020 Arizona State Sun Devils football team represented Arizona State University in the 2020 NCAA Division I FBS football season. The Sun Devils played their home games at Sun Devil Stadium in Tempe Arizona, and competed in the South Division of the Pac-12 Conference. They were led by third-year head coach Herm Edwards.

On August 11, 2020, the Pac-12 Conference canceled all fall sports competitions due to the COVID-19 pandemic. On September 3, the Pac-12 announced a 2020 football season featuring a seven-game conference-only schedule starting on November 7 and ending with the Pac-12 Championship Game on December 18.

Due to several games being canceled, the Sun Devils played only four games during the season, compiling a 2–2 record. The team announced on December 20 that it would not participate in any bowl game. Overall on the season, Arizona State outscored their opponents by a combined total of 161 to 93, largely on the strength of their 70–7 blowout win over Arizona in the Territorial Cup. It was the second-largest margin of victory in the history of the rivalry.

== Offseason ==
=== Position key ===
Back	B	Center	C	Cornerback	CB	Defensive back	DB
Defensive end	DE	Defensive lineman	DL	Defensive tackle	DT	End	E
Fullback	FB	Guard	G	Halfback	HB	Kicker	K
Kickoff returner	KR	Offensive tackle	OT	Offensive lineman	OL	Linebacker	LB
Long snapper	LS	Punter	P	Punt returner	PR	Quarterback	QB
Running back	RB	Safety	S	Tight end	TE	Wide receiver	WR

=== Recruiting ===
College recruiting
Name	Hometown	School	Height	Weight	Commit date
Daniyel Ngata; RB	Folsom, CA	Folsom HS	5 ft 9 in (1.75 m)	193 lb (88 kg)	Jan 2, 2020
Daniyel Ngata; RB	Recruit ratings: Rivals: 247Sports: ESPN: (85)				
Johnny Wilson; WR	Calabasas, CA	Calabasas HS	6 ft 6 in (1.98 m)	230 lb (100 kg)	Dec 18, 2019
Johnny Wilson; WR	Recruit ratings: Rivals: 247Sports: ESPN: (84)				
Elijhah Badger; WR	Sacramento, CA	Folsom HS	6 ft 1 in (1.85 m)	190 lb (86 kg)	Jan 2, 2020
Elijhah Badger; WR	Recruit ratings: Rivals: 247Sports: ESPN: (82)				
LV Bunkley–Shelton; WR	Gardena, CA	Junípero Serra HS	5 ft 11 in (1.80 m)	180 lb (82 kg)	Jan 4, 2020
LV Bunkley–Shelton; WR	Recruit ratings: Rivals: 247Sports: ESPN: (80)				
Jordan Banks; LB	Harbor City, CA	Narbonne HS	6 ft 2 in (1.88 m)	230 lb (100 kg)	Oct 4, 2019
Jordan Banks; LB	Recruit ratings: Rivals: 247Sports: ESPN: (80)				
DeaMonte Trayanum; RB	Akron, OH	Archbishop Hoban HS	5 ft 11 in (1.80 m)	215 lb (98 kg)	Jun 26, 2019
DeaMonte Trayanum; RB	Recruit ratings: Rivals: 247Sports: ESPN: (80)				
Chad Johnson Jr. WR	Los Angeles, CA	Cathedral HS	6 ft 2 in (1.88 m)	180 lb (82 kg)	Oct 29, 2018
Chad Johnson Jr. WR	Recruit ratings: Rivals: 247Sports: ESPN: (80)				
Omarr Norman–Lott; DT	North Highlands, CA	Grant Union HS	6 ft 3 in (1.91 m)	296 lb (134 kg)	Oct 6, 2019
Omarr Norman–Lott; DT	Recruit ratings: Rivals: 247Sports: ESPN: (80)				
Joe Moore; DE	Florissant, MO	Cardinal Ritter College Prep HS	6 ft 3 in (1.91 m)	240 lb (110 kg)	Oct 18, 2019
Joe Moore; DE	Recruit ratings: Rivals: 247Sports: ESPN: (80)				
D.J. Taylor; DB	Brandon, FL	Tampa Catholic HS	5 ft 11 in (1.80 m)	190 lb (86 kg)	Jun 16, 2019
D.J. Taylor; DB	Recruit ratings: Rivals: 247Sports: ESPN: (79)				
Caleb McCullough; LB	Oxnard, CA	Pacifica HS	6 ft 2 in (1.88 m)	210 lb (95 kg)	Oct 18, 2019
Caleb McCullough; LB	Recruit ratings: Rivals: 247Sports: ESPN: (75)				
Macen Williams; DB	Carson, CA	Narbonne HS	5 ft 10 in (1.78 m)	170 lb (77 kg)	Jun 1, 2019
Macen Williams; DB	Recruit ratings: Rivals: 247Sports: ESPN: (76)				
T Lee; DB	Buford, GA	Buford HS	5 ft 10 in (1.78 m)	170 lb (77 kg)	Nov 22, 2018
T Lee; DB	Recruit ratings: Rivals: 247Sports: ESPN: (76)				
Edward Woods; DB	Oakland CA	McClymonds HS	6 ft 0 in (1.83 m)	175 lb (79 kg)	Dec 9, 2019
Edward Woods; DB	Recruit ratings: Rivals: 247Sports: ESPN: (76)				
Ben Bray; OT	Mesa, AZ	Red Mountain HS	6 ft 5 in (1.96 m)	270 lb (120 kg)	May 21, 2019
Ben Bray; OT	Recruit ratings: Rivals: 247Sports: ESPN: (75)				
Daylin McLemore; QB	San Mateo, CA	Junípero Serra HS	6 ft 3 in (1.91 m)	195 lb (88 kg)	Feb 5, 2020
Daylin McLemore; QB	Recruit ratings: Rivals: 247Sports: ESPN: (80)				
Jacob Nunez; OT	Lompoc, CA	Lompoc HS	6 ft 4 in (1.93 m)	280 lb (130 kg)	Jul 4, 2019
Jacob Nunez; OT	Recruit ratings: Rivals: 247Sports: ESPN: (74)				
Jake Ray; TE	Fort Lauderdale, FL	St. Thomas Aquinas HS	6 ft 4 in (1.93 m)	240 lb (110 kg)	Feb 5, 2020
Jake Ray; TE	Recruit ratings: Rivals: 247Sports: ESPN: (74)				
Overall recruit ranking:
‡ Refers to 40-yard dash; Note: In many cases, Scout, Rivals, 247Sports, On3, and ESPN may conflict in their listings of height, weight and 40 time.; In these cases, the average was taken. ESPN grades are on a 100-point scale.; Sources: "Arizona State Football Commitment List". Rivals.; "2020 Player Commitments – Arizona State". ESPN.; "2020 Team Ranking". Rivals.com.; "2020 Arizona State Sun Devils football team". 247Sports.

=== 2020 NFL draft ===
==== ASU players drafted into the NFL ====
Player	Position	Round	Pick	NFL team
Brandon Aiyuk	Wide receiver	1	25	San Francisco 49ers
Eno Benjamin	Running back	7	222	Arizona Cardinals

==== Undrafted NFL free agents ====
Player	Position	NFL team
Cohl Cabral	Offensive lineman	Los Angeles Rams
Kobe Williams	Cornerback	Jacksonville Jaguars
Khaylan Kearse-Thomas	Linebacker	Tennessee Titans
Tommy Hudson	Tight end	Tennessee Titans

== Personnel ==
=== Coaching staff ===
Name	Position	Consecutive season at Arizona State in current position
Herm Edwards	Head coach	3rd Year
Shawn Slocum	Associate head coach / special teams coordinator	3rd Year
Antonio Pierce	Associate head coach / co-defensive coordinator / recruiting coordinator	3rd Year
Marvin Lewis	Co-defensive coordinator	1st Year
Zak Hill	Offensive coordinator / quarterbacks coach	1st Year
Shaun Aguano	Running backs coach	2nd Year
Prentice Gill	Assistant recruiting coordinator / co-wide receivers coach	1st Year
Derek Hagan	Co-wide receivers	1st Year
Tony White	Assistant coach / passing game coordinator / cornerbacks coach	2nd Year
Dave Christensen	Offensive line coach	3rd Year
Robert Rodriguez	Defensive line coach	1st Year
Chris Hawkins	Defensive backs coach	1st Year

=== Roster ===
Arizona State roster as of the first week. (as of November 7, 2020)

2020 Arizona State Sun Devils roster
Quarterbacks: 5 Jayden Daniels, Sophomore (6'3, 175); 12 Nathan Manning, Freshman (6'3, 185); 15 Daylin McLemore, Freshman (6'3, 195); 16 Trenton Bourguet, (redshirt) Freshman (5'11, 171); Running backs: 1 Chip Trayanum, Freshman (5'11, 230); 3 Rachaad White, Junior (6'0, 186); 4 Daniyel Ngata, Freshman (5'9, 193); 9 Demetrious Flowers, (redshirt) Freshman (6'0, 201); 22 Deonce Elliott, Freshman (5'10, 190); 24 Noah Vella, Freshman (6'0, 190); 32 Jackson He, (redshirt) Junior (5'9, 220); 47 Tavian Gould, (redshirt) Sophomore (5'10, 175); Wide receivers: 2 LV Bunkley-Shelton, Freshman (5'11, 180); 6 Geordon Porter, (redshirt) Sophomore (6'2, 190); 8 Jordan Kerley, Sophomore (6'2, 184); 14 Johnny Wilson, Freshman (6'7, 220); 17 Chad Johnson Jr., Freshman (6'2, 180); 19 Ricky Pearsall, Sophomore (6'1, 190); 20 Giovanni Sanders, Junior (5'11, 175); 21 Elijhah Badger, Freshman (6'1, 190); 23 Evan Burkhardt, Freshman (5'10, 180); 26 Keith Davis, (redshirt) Sophomore (6'1, 187); 34 Cade Cadam, Freshman (6'0, 175); 35 Mekhi Metcalf, (redshirt) Sophomore (6'4, 185); 36 Justin Faison, Senior (6'3, 205); 39 Nick Johnson, (redshirt) Freshman (5'9, 160); 82 Andre Johnson, (redshirt) Freshman (6'3, 190); 83 Tannor Park, (redshirt) Junior (6'3, 185); 84 Frank Darby, (redshirt) Senior (6'1, 200); 85 Brandon Pierce, (redshirt) Senior (5'11, 175); 89 Josh Hart, (redshirt) Freshman (5'11, 195)	Tight ends: 7 Ethan Long, Sophomore (6'2, 221); 18 Jake Ray, Freshman (6'4, 240); 29 Case Hatch, Sophomore (6'1, 266); 80 Kyle Horn, Graduate Transfer (6'5, 245); 81 Ryan Morgan, Freshman (6'3, 245); 86 Curtis Hodges, Senior (6'8, 237); 87 John Stivers, Graduate Transfer (6'3, 255); 88 Nolan Matthews, Sophomore (6'5, 246); Offensive lineman: 50 Jarrett Bell, (redshirt) Sophomore (6'5, 299); 54 Eddie Medina, (redshirt) Sophomore (6'3, 285); 55 Jacob Nunez, Freshman (6'4, 280); 56 Cody Shear, (redshirt) Junior (6'4, 280); 59 Marco Salas, (redshirt) Sophomore (6'4, 291); 60 Kyle Breed, (redshirt) Junior (6'7, 288); 61 Dohnovan West, Sophomore (6'3, 277); 64 Ben Bray, Freshman (6'5, 270); 65 Kolbe Stuckwisch, Freshman (6'4, 310); 66 Ben Scott, (redshirt) Freshman (6'5, 291); 70 Henry Hattis, Graduate Transfer (6'5, 297); 72 Cade Cote, Graduate (6'3, 290); 74 Kellen Diesch, Graduate Transfer (6'6, 300); 75 Alijah Bates, (redshirt) Freshman (6'8, 275); 76 Spencer Lovell, (redshirt) Sophomore (6'6, 309); 77 LaDarius Henderson, Sophomore (6'4, 285); 78 Roman DeWys, (redshirt) Freshman (6'5, 299); 79 Ralph Frias, (redshirt) Sophomore (6'6, 320)	Defensive line: 9 Stephon Wright, (redshirt) Freshman (6'4, 297); 14 Stanley Lambert, (redshirt) Sophomore (6'4, 225); 41 Tyler Johnson, (redshirt) Junior (6'4, 265); 44 T.J. Pesefea, Junior (6'2, 259); 55 Omarr Norman-Lott, Freshman (6'3, 296); 58 Joe Moore, Freshman (6'3, 240); 62 Alexander Randle, (redshirt) Freshman (6'2, 259); 90 Jermayne Lole, Junior (6'2, 284); 91 Michael Matus, (redshirt) Sophomore (6'2, 253); 94 Corey Stephens, (redshirt) Junior (6'3, 280); 96 Anthonie Cooper, (redshirt) Freshman (6'2, 280); 97 Shannon Forman, Senior (6'2, 293); 98 DJ Davidson, (redshirt) Junior (6'4, 313); 99 Amiri Johnson, (redshirt) Freshman (6'6, 225); Linebackers: 8 Merlin Robertson, Junior (6'3, 251); 20 Darien Butler, Junior (5'11, 242); 22 Caleb McCullough, Freshman (6'2, 210); 23 Jordan Banks, Freshman (6'2, 230); 28 Will Shaffer, Freshman (6'0, 230); 30 Elijah Juarez, Sophomore (6'4, 240); 34 Kyle Soelle, (redshirt) Junior (6'3, 225); 51 Dylan DeVito, Freshman (6'1, 220); 52 Jacob Jornadal, (redshirt) Freshman (5'11, 190); 53 Fritzny Niclasse, (redshirt) Freshman (5'11, 213)	Defensive backs: 0 Jack Jones, (redshirt) Senior (5'11, 170); 1 Jordan Clark, Freshman (5'10, 170); 2 DeAndre Pierce, Graduate Transfer (5'11, 185); 3 Willie Harts, Sophomore (6'0, 162); 4 Evan Fields, Senior (6'0, 193); 6 Timarcus Davis, (redshirt) Junior (6'0, 177); 9 D.J. Taylor, Freshman (6'0, 186); 10 K.J Jarrell, (redshirt) Junior (6'2, 186); 12 Kejuan Markham, Sophomore (6'1, 189); 13 Keon Markham, (redshirt) Freshman (6'1, 203); 15 Cam Philips, (redshirt) Sophomore (6'1, 175); 16 Aashari Crosswell, Junior (6'0, 196); 18 Connor Soelle, (redshirt) Freshman (6'1, 201); 24 Chase Lucas, (redshirt) Senior (6'0, 176); 25 Macen Williams, Freshman (5'10, 170); 26 T Lee, Freshman (5'10, 170); 30 Kaiser Cambra-Cho, Freshman (6'2, 195); 31 Jean Boyd III, Freshman (6'0, 190); 32 Edward Woods, Freshman (6'0, 175); 35 Thaiger Flowers, Freshman (6'2, 180); 36 Alijah Gammage, (redshirt) Sophomore (5'11, 179); 38 Damon Matthews, (redshirt) Freshman (5'9, 176); 48 Vincenzo Granatelli, (redshirt) Junior (6'4, 184); Kickers: 14 Jack Luckhurst, (redshirt) Freshman (6'2, 164); 45 Cristian Zendejas, (redshirt) Junior (5'8, 180); 46 Josh Plaster, Sophomore (6'0, 176); Punters: 17 Tyler Logan, Graduate Transfer (6'0, 176); 25 Michael Turk, (redshirt) Junior (6'1, 228); 43 Michael Williams, Sophomore (6'0, 176); 44 Kevin Macias, (redshirt) Senior (5'11, 201); Long snappers: 49 Gage King, (redshirt) Freshman (6'3, 238); 93 Erik Dickerson, (redshirt) Senior (6'1, 224)

=== Depth chart ===
Defense

FS
Aashari Crosswell
DeAndre Pierce
Cam Phillips

WLB	MLB	SLB
Merlin Robertson	Darien Butler	Kyle Soelle
⋅	Caleb McCullough	Will Shaffer
⋅	Jordan Banks	–

SS
Evan Fields
Kejuan Markham
Alijah Gammage

CB
Chase Lucas
Jordan Clark
T Lee

DE	DT	DT	DE
Shannon Forman	DJ Davidson	Jermayne Lole	Michael Matus
Stanley Lambert	Tautala Pesefea Jr.	Stephon Wright	Tyler Johnson
Anthonie Cooper	Corey Stephens	Omarr Norman-Lott	Amiri Johnson

CB
Jack Jones
Timarcus Davis
Ed Woods

Offense

WR
Frank Darby
Andre Johnson
–

WR
Johnny Wilson
Geordon Porter
Keith Davis

LT	LG	C	RG	RT
Kellen Diesch	Dohnovan West	Cade Cote	Henry Hattis	Ben Scott
Ralph Frias	Ben Bray	Jarrett Bell	Spencer Lovell	LaDarius Henderson
–	–	–	Jacob Nunez	–

WR
Curtis Hodges
Nolan Matthews
Kyle Horn

WR
Ricky Pearsall
LV Bunkley-Shelton
–

QB
Jayden Daniels
Trenton Bourguet
Daylin McLemore

RB
Rachaad White
Chip Trayanum
Daniyel Ngata

Special teams
PK Christian Zendejas
PK Logan Tyler
P Michael Turk
P Kevin Macias
KR Rachaad White
PR Jack Jones
LS Erik Dickerson
H Kevin Macias

== Schedule ==
=== Regular season ===
Arizona State announced its schedule on January 16, 2020. The Sun Devils had games scheduled against Northern Arizona, UNLV, and BYU, but canceled these games on July 10 due to the Pac-12 Conference's decision to play a conference-only schedule due to the COVID-19 pandemic. On July 31, 2020, the Pac-12 Conference announced revisions to the schedule.

Original 2020 Arizona State Sun Devils schedule
Date	Opponent	Site
September 3	Northern Arizona*	Sun Devil Stadium • Tempe, Arizona
September 12	at UNLV*	Allegiant Stadium • Paradise, Nevada
September 19	BYU*	Sun Devil Stadium • Tempe, Arizona
September 26	at USC	Los Angeles Memorial Coliseum • Los Angeles, California
October 3	Oregon State	Sun Devil Stadium • Tempe, Arizona
October 10	UCLA	Sun Devil Stadium • Tempe, Arizona
October 24	at Colorado	Folsom Field • Boulder, Colorado
October 31	at Washington State	Martin Stadium • Pullman, Washington
November 7	California	Sun Devil Stadium • Tempe, Arizona
November 13	at Oregon	Autzen Stadium • Eugene, Oregon
November 21	Utah	Sun Devil Stadium • Tempe, Arizona
November 28	at Arizona	Arizona Stadium • Tucson, Arizona (Duel in the Desert)

Date	Time	Opponent	Site	TV	Result	Attendance
November 7	10:00 a.m.	at No. 20 USC	Los Angeles Memorial Coliseum; Los Angeles, California	FOX	L 27–28	0
~~November 14~~	~~7:30 p.m.~~	~~California~~	~~Sun Devil Stadium~~; ~~Tempe, Arizona~~	~~ESPN~~	No Contest	0
~~November 21~~	~~8:00 p.m.~~	at ~~Colorado~~	~~Folsom Field~~; ~~Boulder, Colorado~~	~~ESPN2~~	No Contest	0
~~November 29~~		~~Utah~~	~~Sun Devil Stadium~~; ~~Tempe, Arizona~~		No Contest	0
December 5	8:30 p.m.	UCLA	Sun Devil Stadium; Tempe, Arizona	FS1	L 18–25	0
December 11	5:30 p.m.	at Arizona	Arizona Stadium; Tucson, Arizona (Duel in the Desert)	ESPN	W 70–7	0
December 19	8:30 p.m.	at Oregon State	Reser Stadium; Corvallis, Oregon	ESPN	W 46–33	0
Rankings from AP Poll released prior to the game; All times are in Mountain time

Schedule source:

== Game summaries ==
=== USC ===
Arizona State Sun Devils at USC Trojans

Quarter	1	2	3	4	Total
Sun Devils	3	14	7	3	27
No. 20 Trojans	7	7	0	14	28

at Los Angeles Memorial Coliseum, Los Angeles, California

- Date: November 7, 2020
- Game time: 9:07 a.m. PT
- Game weather: 57 °F (14 °C) Partly Sunny
- Game attendance: 0
- Referee: Chris Coyte
- TV announcers (Fox): Gus Johnson, Joel Klatt, Jenny Taft

Game information

First Quarter

- Arizona State (12:11) – #45 Cristian Zendejas 38 yard field goal – Arizona State 3–0
- USC (3:30) – #7 Stephen Carr 2 yard run TD
  (#48 Parker Lewis kick) – USC 7–3

Second Quarter

- Arizona State (10:39) – #1 DeaMonte Trayanum 25 yard run TD
  (#45 Cristian Zendejas kicks) – Arizona State 10–7
- USC (6:10) – #30 Markese Stepp 1 yard run TD
  (#48 Parker Lewis kicks) – USC 14–10
- Arizona State (4:48) – #5 Jayden Daniels to #3 Rachaad White 55 yard pass TD
  (#45 Cristian Zendejas kicks) – Arizona State 17–14

Third Quarter

- Arizona State (6:47) – #1 DeaMonte Trayanum 17 yard run TD
  (#45 Cristian Zendejas kicks) – Arizona State 24–14

Fourth Quarter

- Arizona State (11:23) – #45 Cristian Zendejas 38 yard field goal – Arizona State 27–14
- USC (2:52) – #9 Kedon Slovis to #4 Bru McCoy 26 yard pass TD
  (#48 Parker Lewis kicks) – Arizona State 27–21
- USC (1:20) – #9 Kedon Slovis to #15 Drake London 21 yard pass TD
  (#48 Parker Lewis kicks) – USC 28–27

Passing

- Arizona state – #5 Jayden Daniels – 11/23 134 yds 1TD
- USC – #9 Kedon Slovis – 40/55 381 yds 2TD 1Int

Rushing

- Arizona state – #1 DeaMonte Trayanum – 12 Runs 84 yds 2TD
- USC – #30 Markese Stepp – 14 Runs 53 yds 1TD

Receiving

- Arizona state – #3 Rachaad White – 3 Rec 70 yds 1TD
- USC – #15 Drake London – 8 Rec 125 yds 1TD

=== UCLA ===
	1	2	3	4	Total
Bruins	0	17	0	8	25
Sun Devils	0	3	9	6	18

=== Arizona ===
Arizona State Sun Devils vs. Arizona Wildcats – Game summary

Quarter	1	2	3	4	Total
Sun Devils	21	21	21	7	70
Wildcats	0	7	0	0	7

at Arizona Stadium • Tucson, Arizona

- Date: December 11, 2020
- Game time: 5:00 p.m.
- Game attendance: 0
- TV: ESPN

Game information

First quarter

- ASU – D. J. Taylor 100-yard kickoff return (Christian Zendejas kick), 14:47. Arizona State 7–0.
- ASU – DeaMonte Trayanum 4-yard run (Christian Zendejas kick), 14:04. Arizona State 14–0. Drive: 1 play, 4 yards, 0:16.
- ASU – Jayden Daniels 20-yard run (Jack Luckhurst kick), 2:21. Arizona State 21–0. Drive: 6 plays, 41 yards, 3:08.

Second quarter

- ASU – Rachaad White 93-yard run (Jack Luckhurst kick), 11:45. Arizona State 28–0. Drive: 2 plays, 96 yards, 0:59.
- ASU – Ricky Pearsall 31-yard pass from Jayden Daniels (Jack Luckhurst kick), 10:15. Arizona State 35–0. Drive: 2 plays, 26 yards, 1:15.
- ASU – Daniyel Ngata 3-yard run (Jack Luckhurst kick), 5:25. Arizona State 42–0. Drive: 5 plays, 36 yards, 2:05.
- UA – Michael Wiley 20-yard run (Lucas Havrisik kick), 3:38. Arizona State 42–7. Drive: 5 plays, 75 yards, 1:47.

Third quarter

- ASU – Rachaad White 2-yard run (Jack Luckhurst kick), 10:28. Arizona State 49–7. Drive: 6 plays, 55 yards, 3:00.
- ASU – Rachaad White 1-yard run (Jack Luckhurst kick), 6:29. Arizona State 56–7. Drive: 7 plays, 30 yards, 3:28.
- ASU – Curtis Hodges 74-yard pass from Jayden Daniels (Jack Luckhurst kick), 4:00. Arizona State 63–7. Drive: 2 plays, 73 yards, 0:52.

Fourth quarter

- ASU – Jackson He 1-yard run (Jack Luckhurst kick), 7:02. Arizona State 70–7. Drive: 7 plays, 43 yards, 4:01.

Top passers

- ASU – Jayden Daniels – 9/11, 203 yards, 2 TD
- UA – Will Plummer – 7/13, 83 yards

Top rushers

- ASU – Rachaad White – 10 rushes, 133 yards, 3 TD
- UA – Gary Brightwell – 17 rushes, 49 yards

Top receivers

- ASU – Curtis Hodges – 1 reception, 74 yards, TD
- UA – Majon Wright – 8 receptions, 85 yards

=== Oregon State ===
	1	2	3	4	Total
Beavers	7	8	12	6	33
Sun Devils	7	19	14	6	46

== Rankings ==
Ranking movements Legend: — = Not ranked RV = Received votes
	Week															
Poll	Pre	1	2	3	4	5	6	7	8	9	10	11	12	13	14	Final
AP	RV															
Coaches	RV		—													
CFP	Not released															Not released

== Players drafted into the NFL ==
Round	Pick	Player	Position	NFL club
6	187	Frank Darby	WR	Atlanta Falcons
