= List of Arizona State Sun Devils in the NFL draft =

This is a list of Arizona State Sun Devils football players who were drafted into the NFL.

== Key ==
B	Back	K	Kicker	NT	Nose tackle
C	Center	LB	Linebacker	FB	Fullback
DB	Defensive back	P	Punter	HB	Halfback
DE	Defensive end	QB	Quarterback	WR	Wide receiver
DT	Defensive tackle	RB	Running back	OG	Guard
E	End	OT	Offensive tackle	TE	Tight end

== Selections ==
Year	Round	Pick	Player	Team	Position
1941	13	112	Wayne Pitts	Chicago Cardinals	B
1943	17	154	Al Onofrio	Brooklyn Dodgers	B
1943	18	170	John Baklarz	Washington Redskins	T
1948	10	80	Glenn Johnson	Los Angeles Rams	T
1951	3	36	Wilford White	Chicago Bears	B
1951	12	141	Henry Rich	Philadelphia Eagles	B
1952	27	323	Duane Morrison	New York Giants	B
1953	2	18	John Henry Johnson	Pittsburgh Steelers	RB
1953	12	139	Dick Curran	Green Bay Packers	B
1953	12	141	Joe Matesic	New York Giants	T
1953	14	165	Tom Fletcher	San Francisco 49ers	B
1953	26	309	Harley Coper	San Francisco 49ers	B
1953	27	318	Marvin Wahlin	Chicago Bears	B
1954	5	52	Earl Putnam	New York Giants	T
1955	10	119	John Allen	Chicago Bears	E
1955	17	199	Gene Mitcham	Los Angeles Rams	E
1956	11	130	John Jankans	Chicago Bears	E
1957	13	152	Charley Mackey	San Francisco 49ers	E
1957	19	219	Bill Zuhowski	Los Angeles Rams	T
1957	27	315	Clancy Osborn	Los Angeles Rams	E
1958	5	52	Bobby Mulgado	Philadelphia Eagles	B
1958	8	87	Leon Burton	San Francisco 49ers	B
1958	29	344	O'Jay Bourgeois	Los Angeles Rams	B
1959	14	157	Ken Kerr	Green Bay Packers	G
1959	15	174	Joe Belland	San Francisco 49ers	B
1961	14	191	Charley Bowers	Detroit Lions	RB
1961	15	197	Mike Mercer	Minnesota Vikings	E
1962	18	248	Joe Zuger	Detroit Lions	QB
1963	8	105	Roger Locke	San Francisco 49ers	E
1963	19	253	Domel Nelson	Los Angeles Rams	B
1964	1	3	Charley Taylor	Washington Redskins	RB
1964	2	22	Tony Lorick	Baltimore Colts	RB
1964	6	71	Gary Lewis	San Francisco 49ers	B
1964	19	255	John Seedborg	Washington Redskins	G
1965	4	43	Henry Carr	New York Giants	RB
1965	4	44	Larry Todd	San Francisco 49ers	WR
1965	9	118	Jerry Smith	Washington Redskins	TE
1965	14	189	Dave Estrada	Washington Redskins	RB
1965	15	201	Gene Foster	Dallas Cowboys	B
1965	20	267	John Torok	New York Giants	QB
1966	3	36	Ben Hawkins	Philadelphia Eagles	WR
1967	1	22	John Pitts	Buffalo Bills	WR
1967	4	93	Travis Williams	Green Bay Packers	RB
1967	8	190	Larry Hendershot	Washington Redskins	G
1967	11	270	Ray Shirley	Detroit Lions	T
1968	2	31	Curley Culp	Denver Broncos	DE
1968	4	100	Ken Dyer	San Diego Chargers	WR
1968	5	132	Max Anderson	Buffalo Bills	RB
1968	16	418	Bob Rokita	Detroit Lions	DE
1969	1	15	Ron Pritchard	Houston Oilers	LB
1969	3	59	Larry Walton	Detroit Lions	WR
1969	5	124	Fair Hooker	Cleveland Browns	WR
1969	6	152	Rick Shaw	Dallas Cowboys	WR
1969	7	157	John Helton	Buffalo Bills	DE
1969	12	296	Wes Plummer	Denver Broncos	DB
1969	14	357	Ed Roseborough	St. Louis Cardinals	QB
1969	17	435	George Hummer	St. Louis Cardinals	C
1970	2	39	Art Malone	Atlanta Falcons	RB
1970	8	195	Seth Miller	Atlanta Falcons	DB
1970	11	272	Mike Brunson	Atlanta Falcons	RB
1970	16	413	Seabern Hill	Dallas Cowboys	DB
1971	1	4	J. D. Hill	Buffalo Bills	WR
1971	8	205	Jim McCann	San Francisco 49ers	K
1971	9	219	Mike Fanucci	Washington Redskins	DE
1971	15	379	Bob Thomas	Cincinnati Bengals	RB
1972	4	96	Windlan Hall	San Francisco 49ers	DB
1972	8	201	Hugh McKinnis	Cleveland Browns	RB
1972	8	206	Calvin Demery	Minnesota Vikings	WR
1972	13	314	Justin Hamilton	Cincinnati Bengals	QB
1972	17	423	Oscar Dragon	San Diego Chargers	RB
1972	17	425	Junior Ah You	New England Patriots	LB
1973	1	16	Steve Holden	Cleveland Browns	WR
1973	5	118	Brent McClanahan	Minnesota Vikings	RB
1973	5	122	Ed Beverly	San Francisco 49ers	WR
1973	8	200	Prentice McCray	Detroit Lions	DB
1973	11	276	Monroe Eley	Kansas City Chiefs	RB
1973	12	303	Ron Lumpkin	New York Giants	DB
1973	14	339	Ron Lou	Houston Oilers	C
1973	16	397	Joe Petty	San Diego Chargers	DB
1974	1	16	Woody Green	Kansas City Chiefs	RB
1974	2	47	Benny Malone	Miami Dolphins	RB
1974	3	53	Danny White	Dallas Cowboys	QB
1974	5	128	Monroe Eley	Atlanta Falcons	RB
1974	11	262	Dave Grannell	San Diego Chargers	TE
1974	14	364	Sam Johnson	Miami Dolphins	LB
1974	16	393	Neal Skarin	San Diego Chargers	DE
1974	16	397	Alonzo Emery	St. Louis Cardinals	RB
1975	3	70	Bob Breunig	Dallas Cowboys	LB
1975	5	106	Morris Owens	Miami Dolphins	WR
1976	1	5	Mike Haynes	New England Patriots	DB
1976	1	17	Larry Gordon	Miami Dolphins	LB
1976	12	334	Randy Moore	Denver Broncos	DT
1976	16	438	Chris Lorenzen	Cleveland Browns	DT
1977	8	221	Fred Williams	Dallas Cowboys	RB
1977	9	251	Larry Mucker	Tampa Bay Buccaneers	WR
1978	1	14	John Jefferson	San Diego Chargers	WR
1978	7	173	John Harris	Seattle Seahawks	DB
1978	8	200	Dennis Sproul	Green Bay Packers	QB
1978	9	242	Tim Petersen	New England Patriots	LB
1978	9	247	Bruce Hardy	Miami Dolphins	TE
1979	1	9	Al Harris	Chicago Bears	DE
1979	3	69	Kim Anderson	Baltimore Colts	DB
1979	6	148	Jeff McIntyre	Denver Broncos	LB
1979	6	164	Chris DeFrance	Dallas Cowboys	WR
1979	12	308	Mike Harris	Buffalo Bills	RB
1980	1	28	Mark Malone	Pittsburgh Steelers	QB
1980	2	35	Bob Kohrs	Pittsburgh Steelers	LB
1980	7	171	Ben Apuna	St. Louis Cardinals	LB
1980	9	234	Joe Peters	New York Jets	DT
1980	11	300	Gary Padjen	Dallas Cowboys	LB
1981	3	59	John Mistler	New York Giants	WR
1981	4	97	Ron Washington	Kansas City Chiefs	WR
1981	6	145	Mel Hoover	New York Giants	WR
1982	1	9	Gerald Riggs	Atlanta Falcons	RB
1982	2	40	Robert Weathers	New England Patriots	RB
1982	2	43	John Meyer	Pittsburgh Steelers	T
1982	3	74	Jerry Bell	Tampa Bay Buccaneers	TE
1982	4	84	Mike Pagel	Baltimore Colts	QB
1982	5	139	Newton Williams	San Francisco 49ers	RB
1982	8	196	Tony Loia	Baltimore Colts	G
1983	1	23	Jim Jeffcoat	Dallas Cowboys	DE
1983	2	29	Vernon Maxwell	Baltimore Colts	LB
1983	2	33	Mike Richardson	Chicago Bears	DB
1983	2	41	Ron Brown	Cleveland Browns	WR
1983	3	77	Bryan Caldwell	Dallas Cowboys	DE
1983	4	92	Ron Wetzel	Kansas City Chiefs	TE
1983	7	169	Alvin Moore	Baltimore Colts	RB
1983	7	181	Mike Black	Detroit Lions	P
1983	10	254	Walt Bowyer	Denver Broncos	DE
1984	6	150	Don Kern	Cincinnati Bengals	TE
1984	8	211	James Keyton	New England Patriots	T
1985	4	94	Doug Allen	New York Jets	WR
1985	5	125	Brian Noble	Green Bay Packers	LB
1985	8	204	Phil Freeman	Tampa Bay Buccaneers	WR
1985	12	323	Jim Meyer	Green Bay Packers	P
1986	2	33	Darryl Clack	Dallas Cowboys	RB
1986	3	78	David Fulcher	Cincinnati Bengals	DB
1986	11	299	Vince Amoia	New York Jets	RB
1986	12	324	Mike Crawford	Houston Oilers	RB
1987	3	69	Scott Stephen	Green Bay Packers	LB
1987	3	77	Skip McClendon	Cincinnati Bengals	DE
1987	4	106	Bruce Hill	Tampa Bay Buccaneers	WR
1987	5	113	Danny Villa	New England Patriots	T
1987	7	175	Dan Saleaumua	Detroit Lions	DT
1987	11	281	Jim Reynosa	Indianapolis Colts	DE
1987	11	296	Jim Warne	Cincinnati Bengals	T
1988	1	19	Randall McDaniel	Minnesota Vikings	G
1988	1	20	Aaron Cox	Los Angeles Rams	WR
1988	2	30	Eric Allen	Philadelphia Eagles	DB
1988	2	34	Shawn Patterson	Green Bay Packers	DT
1988	4	108	Todd Kalis	Minnesota Vikings	G
1988	10	268	Channing Williams	Denver Broncos	RB
1988	12	329	Greg Clark	Chicago Bears	LB
1989	9	225	Scott Kirby	Green Bay Packers	T
1989	11	306	Dana Wells	Cincinnati Bengals	DT
1990	5	122	Lynn James	Cincinnati Bengals	WR
1991	1	14	Leonard Russell	New England Patriots	RB
1991	5	127	Floyd Fields	San Diego Chargers	DB
1991	7	190	Paul Justin	Chicago Bears	QB
1991	8	206	Reggie Johnson	Minnesota Vikings	DE
1991	9	234	Paul Glonek	New York Jets	DT
1991	11	282	Nathan LaDuke	Phoenix Cardinals	DB
1991	12	315	Mark Hayes	New York Jets	T
1992	2	37	Darren Woodson	Dallas Cowboys	DB
1992	2	41	Phillippi Sparks	New York Giants	DB
1992	2	47	Shane Collins	Washington Redskins	DE
1992	9	232	David Dixon	New England Patriots	DT
1992	10	258	Arthur Paul	San Diego Chargers	DT
1993	6	143	Brett Wallerstedt	Phoenix Cardinals	LB
1993	8	201	Kevin Miniefield	Detroit Lions	DB
1994	1	23	Shante Carver	Dallas Cowboys	DE
1994	2	44	Mario Bates	New Orleans Saints	RB
1995	1	32	Craig Newsome	Green Bay Packers	DB
1995	4	126	Jason Kyle	Seattle Seahawks	LB
1995	5	154	Jeff Kysar	Oakland Raiders	T
1995	6	202	Bryan Proby	Kansas City Chiefs	DT
1995	7	240	J. T. Thomas	Los Angeles Rams	WR
1996	7	243	Ryan Wood	Dallas Cowboys	RB
1997	2	35	Juan Roque	Detroit Lions	T
1997	2	42	Jake Plummer	Arizona Cardinals	QB
1997	3	80	Derek Smith	Washington Redskins	LB
1997	3	92	Derrick Rodgers	Miami Dolphins	LB
1997	4	116	Keith Poole	New Orleans Saints	WR
1997	6	182	Scott Von der Ahe	Indianapolis Colts	LB
1997	6	196	Shawn Swayda	Chicago Bears	DT
1997	7	206	Terry Battle	Detroit Lions	RB
1998	2	41	Jeremy Staat	Pittsburgh Steelers	DE
1998	5	137	Jason Simmons	Pittsburgh Steelers	DB
1998	6	165	Damien Richardson	Carolina Panthers	DB
1998	7	226	Pat Tillman	Arizona Cardinals	DB
1998	7	230	Vince Amey	Oakland Raiders	DT
1999	3	72	Grey Ruegamer	Miami Dolphins	C
1999	3	92	Jeff Paulk	Atlanta Falcons	RB
1999s	4	0	J'Juan Cherry	New England Patriots	DB
2000	1	26	Erik Flowers	Buffalo Bills	DE
2000	2	38	Marvel Smith	Pittsburgh Steelers	T
2000	3	76	J. R. Redmond	New England Patriots	RB
2000	4	96	Terrelle Smith	New Orleans Saints	RB
2000	4	107	Junior Ioane	Oakland Raiders	DT
2000	7	230	Brian Jennings	San Francisco 49ers	TE
2001	1	20	Adam Archuleta	St. Louis Rams	DB
2001	1	31	Todd Heap	Baltimore Ravens	TE
2001	5	135	Victor Leyva	Cincinnati Bengals	G
2002	1	10	Levi Jones	Cincinnati Bengals	T
2002	4	124	Scott Peters	Philadelphia Eagles	C
2002	4	130	Travis Scott	St. Louis Rams	G
2002	7	249	Kyle Kosier	San Francisco 49ers	G
2003	1	10	Terrell Suggs	Baltimore Ravens	DE
2003	4	106	Shaun McDonald	St. Louis Rams	WR
2003	4	135	Solomon Bates	Seattle Seahawks	LB
2004	5	156	Mike Karney	New Orleans Saints	RB
2004	5	158	Jason Shivers	St. Louis Rams	DB
2005	3	69	Andrew Walter	Oakland Raiders	QB
2005	5	151	Drew Hodgdon	Houston Texans	C
2005	7	232	Jimmy Verdon	New Orleans Saints	DT
2006	3	82	Derek Hagan	Miami Dolphins	WR
2006	4	120	Jamar Williams	Chicago Bears	LB
2007	2	38	Zach Miller	Oakland Raiders	TE
2007	7	252	Andrew Carnahan	Jacksonville Jaguars	T
2008	2	59	Mike Pollak	Indianapolis Colts	C
2008	4	124	Justin Tryon	Washington Redskins	DB
2008	5	138	Robert James	Atlanta Falcons	LB
2008	5	139	Ryan Torain	Denver Broncos	RB
2008	7	220	Josh Barrett	Denver Broncos	DB
2009	7	213	Paul Fanaika	Philadelphia Eagles	G
2009	7	223	Troy Nolan	Houston Texans	DB
2010	3	92	Shawn Lauvao	Cleveland Browns	G
2010	6	190	Travis Goethel	Oakland Raiders	LB
2010	6	206	Kyle Williams	San Francisco 49ers	WR
2011	7	233	Lawrence Guy	Green Bay Packers	DT
2012	2	57	Brock Osweiler	Denver Broncos	QB
2012	4	101	Omar Bolden	Denver Broncos	DB
2014	3	82	Will Sutton	Chicago Bears	DT
2014	4	121	Carl Bradford	Green Bay Packers	LB
2014	6	201	Marion Grice	San Diego Chargers	RB
2015	1	30	Damarious Randall	Green Bay Packers	DB
2015	3	70	Jaelen Strong	Houston Texans	WR
2015	4	114	Jamil Douglas	Miami Dolphins	G
2015	4	135	Marcus Hardison	Cincinnati Bengals	DE
2016	5	161	Christian Westerman	Cincinnati Bengals	G
2016	7	225	Devin Lucien	New England Patriots	WR
2017	7	224	Zane Gonzalez	Cleveland Browns	K
2018	4	131	Kalen Ballage	Miami Dolphins	RB
2018	6	178	Christian Sam	New England Patriots	LB
2018	6	183	Sam Jones	Denver Broncos	G
2019	1	32	N'Keal Harry	New England Patriots	WR
2019	4	125	Renell Wren	Cincinnati Bengals	DT
2020	1	25	Brandon Aiyuk	San Francisco 49ers	WR
2020	7	222	Eno Benjamin	Arizona Cardinals	RB
2021	6	187	Frank Darby	Atlanta Falcons	WR
2022	3	91	Rachaad White	Tampa Bay Buccaneers	RB
2022	4	121	Jack Jones	New England Patriots	DB
2022	5	127	DJ Davidson	New York Giants	DT
2022	7	237	Chase Lucas	Detroit Lions	DB
2023	7	231	Nesta Jade Silvera	Las Vegas Raiders	DT
2025	4	105	Cam Skattebo	New York Giants	RB
2026	1	8	Jordyn Tyson	New Orleans Saints	WR
2026	1	21	Max Iheanachor	Pittsburgh Steelers	T
2026	5	157	Keith Abney II	Detroit Lions	DB
2026	5	166	Keyshaun Elliott	Chicago Bears	LB
