= Chip Trayanum =

American football player (born 2002)

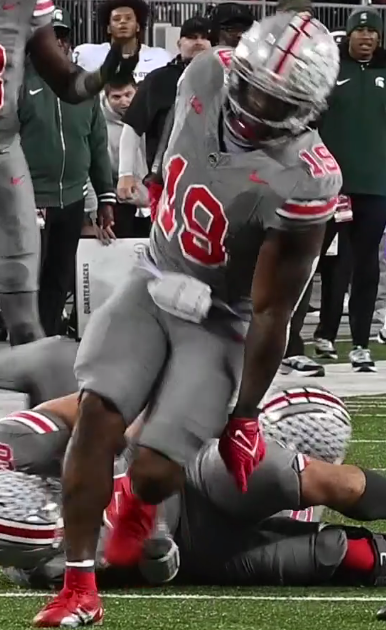
- Trayanum with Ohio State in 2023

No. 40 – New York Jets
- Position: Running back
- Roster status: Injured reserve

Personal information
- Born: January 2, 2002 (age 24); Akron, Ohio, U.S.
- Listed height: 5 ft 11 in (1.80 m)
- Listed weight: 224 lb (102 kg)

Career information
- High school: Archbishop Hoban (OH)
- College: Arizona State (2020–2021); Ohio State (2022–2023); Kentucky (2024); Toledo (2025)
- NFL draft: 2026: undrafted

Career history
- New York Jets (2026–present)

Awards and highlights
- First-team All-MAC (2025)
- Stats at Pro Football Reference

DeaMonte "Chip" Larue Trayanum (born January 2, 2002) is an American professional football running back for the New York Jets of the National Football League (NFL). He played college football for the Toledo Rockets, Arizona State Sun Devils, Ohio State Buckeyes, and Kentucky Wildcats.

== Early life ==
Trayanum attended Archbishop Hoban High School where he was a four-year starter and helped them win three consecutive state championships. As a junior, he played running back and linebacker, averaging 12.4 yards-per-rush and gaining 1,313 rushing yards with 26 touchdowns while also having eight sacks in his school's undefeated season.

Trayanum was named a first-team All-Ohio Division II selection for his performance. Prior to his senior season, he committed to play college football for the Arizona State Sun Devils as the first-ranked running back in Ohio, a four-star recruit, the fifth-best player in the state and the 24th-best running back nationally according to 247Sports. He missed much of his senior season due to injury.

== College career ==
Trayanum had the options to play linebacker or running back coming out of high school and opted to play the latter at Arizona State. As a true freshman for the Sun Devils, he appeared in all four games during the COVID-19-shortened season and totaled 290 rushing yards and four touchdowns, averaging 5.9 yards-per-carry. The following season, he played nine games and ran 78 times for 402 yards with six touchdowns, averaging 5.2 yards-per-carry although his playing time decreased after two fumbles. He entered the NCAA transfer portal after the year.

Trayanum ultimately transferred to his hometown Ohio State Buckeyes. He changed his position to linebacker upon joining the team. He played several positions in his first season, including linebacker, return specialist, and late in the year switched back to running back due to Ohio State's lack of depth at the position. He had his top game of the season against the Michigan Wolverines, running for 83 yards on 14 attempts. Trayanum finished the year with 92 rushing yards, 13 total tackles and three kickoff returns for 29 yards.

Trayanum entered the 2023 season as the third-string running back on the depth chart, behind TreVeyon Henderson and Miyan Williams. He scored his first touchdown in an Ohio State uniform against the Western Kentucky Hilltoppers on a 40-yard run. Against Notre Dame the following week, he scored a game-winning one-yard touchdown in the last second to win 17–14.

On December 6, 2023, Trayanum announced that he would be entering the transfer portal. He committed to Kentucky on December 12, 2023.

On December 9, 2024, Trayanum announced that he would enter the transfer portal for the third time.

=== Statistics ===
Year	Team	Games		Rushing				Receiving			
Year	Team	GP	GS	Att	Yards	Avg	TD	Rec	Yards	Avg	TD
2020	Arizona State	4	1	49	290	5.9	4	1	5	5.0	0
2021	Arizona State	9	3	78	401	5.1	6	4	19	4.8	0
2022	Ohio State	11	0	15	92	6.1	0	1	14	14.0	0
2023	Ohio State	12	3	85	373	4.4	3	9	53	5.9	0
2024	Kentucky	3	0	19	101	5.3	0	0	0	0.0	0
2025	Toledo	11	11	182	1,015	5.6	12	21	212	10.1	2
Career		50	18	428	2,272	5.3	25	36	303	8.4	2

== Professional career ==
Pre-draft measurables
Height	Weight	Arm length	Hand span	Wingspan	40-yard dash	10-yard split	20-yard split	20-yard shuttle	Three-cone drill	Vertical jump	Broad jump	Bench press
5 ft 10 5/8 in (1.79 m)	224 lb (102 kg)	31 1/2 in (0.80 m)	9 3/4 in (0.25 m)	6 ft 2 3/8 in (1.89 m)	4.52 s	1.60 s	2.51 s	4.25 s	7.08 s	37.0 in (0.94 m)	9 ft 11 in (3.02 m)	27 reps
All values from Pro Day

On May 8, 2026, Trayanum signed with the New York Jets as an undrafted free agent. He was placed on injured reserve on August 30, due to a neck injury suffered in the team's preseason matchup against the New York Giants.
