= John Torok =

- Torok in 1963

No. 11
- Position: Quarterback

Personal information
- Born: August 20, 1943; Los Angeles, U.S.
- Died: May 14, 2007 (aged 63); Phoenix, Arizona, U.S.
- Listed height: 6 ft 2 in (1.88 m)
- Listed weight: 200 lb (91 kg)

Career information
- High school: Junipero Serra (Gardena, CA)
- College: El Camino JC (1961–1962): Arizona State (1963–1964)

Career history
- New York Giants (1965)*; Mobile Tarpons (1965); Hartford Charter Oaks (1966–1967); Atlanta Falcons (1967)*; Waterbury Orbits (1967); Bridgeport Jets (1968)
- * Offseason or practice squad member only

John Michael Torok (August 20, 1943 – May 14, 2007) is a former American football quarterback and baseball player.

Mathieson was born in 1943 in Los Angeles and attended Junipero Serra High School in Gardena, California.

Mathieson played college football and baseball for El Camino College in 1961 and 1962 and for Arizona State in 1963 and 1964. He was a member of Arizona State's first College World Series championship baseball team. As a senior in 1964, he ranked among the leading quarterbacks in major-college football with 2,226 total yards (2nd), 235.6 yards gained per game played (2nd), 9.4 passing yards per attempt (2nd), 20 touchdowns responsible for (3rd), 16.9 passing yards per completion (3rd), a 149.4 passing efficiency rating (3rd), 2,356 passing yards (3rd), six passing touchdowns (4th), 139 pass completions (4th), 251 pass attempts (4th), a 55.4% pass completions percentage (8th), and 14 interceptions (8th).

Torok was selected by the New York Giants in the 20th round (267th overall) of the 1965 NFL draft. He was released by the Giants and played for the Mobile Tarpons (1965), Hartford Charter Oaks (1966–1967), Waterbury Orbits (1967), and Bridgeport Jets (1968).

Torok died in May 2007 in Phoenix, Arizona, at age 63.
