= Johnny Wilson (wide receiver) =

American football player (born 2001)

Profile
- Position: Wide receiver

Personal information
- Born: April 3, 2001 (age 25); Los Angeles, California, U.S.
- Listed height: 6 ft 6 in (1.98 m)
- Listed weight: 228 lb (103 kg)

Career information
- High school: Calabasas (Calabasas, California)
- College: Arizona State (2020–2021); Florida State (2022–2023)
- NFL draft: 2024: 6th round, 185th overall pick

Career history
- Philadelphia Eagles (2024–2025)

Awards and highlights
- Super Bowl champion (LIX); Second-team All-ACC (2022); Third-team All-ACC (2023)

Career NFL statistics as of 2024
- Receptions: 5
- Receiving yards: 38
- Receiving touchdowns: 1
- Stats at Pro Football Reference

Johnny Wilson (born April 3, 2001) is an American professional football wide receiver for the Philadelphia Eagles of the National Football League (NFL). He previously played college football for the Arizona State Sun Devils and the Florida State Seminoles.

== Early life ==
Wilson was born on April 3, 2001, in Los Angeles, California, to parents of African and Filipino descent. He is of quarter-Filipino descent through his maternal grandmother and African descent through his grandfather. He grew up in the Pacoima neighborhood of Los Angeles, California, and attended Calabasas High School in Calabasas, California.

Wilson was rated a four-star recruit and ranked as the nation’s fifth-best wide receiver prospect by 247Sports. He initially committed to play college football at Oregon during the summer before his senior year, choosing the Ducks from 35 total scholarship offers. As a senior, he recorded 37 receptions for 606 yards and eight touchdowns. Late in that season, he flipped his commitment to Arizona State.

== College career ==
Wilson began his college career at Arizona State. As a true freshman, he played in three games and caught six for 89 yards while maintaining a redshirt on the season. Wilson caught 12 passes for 154 yards and one touchdown in 2021. After the season, he entered the NCAA transfer portal.

Wilson ultimately transferred to Florida State.

For the 2022 season, Wilson led all Seminoles in receptions (43), receiving yards (897), and receiving touchdowns (5).

In 2023, Wilson recorded 41 catches for 617 yards and two touchdowns earning Third-Team All-ACC honors. Opting out of the Orange Bowl, Wilson declared for the NFL Draft.

=== Statistics ===
Year	Team	Games		Receiving			
Year	Team	GP	GS	Rec	Yards	Avg	TD
2020	Arizona State	3	1	6	89	14.8	0
2021	Arizona State	5	2	12	154	12.8	1
2022	Florida State	13	13	43	897	20.9	5
2023	Florida State	10	10	41	617	17.9	2
Career		30	25	102	1,757	17.2	8

== Professional career ==
Pre-draft measurables
Height	Weight	Arm length	Hand span	Wingspan	40-yard dash	10-yard split	20-yard split	20-yard shuttle	Vertical jump	Broad jump
6 ft 6 3/8 in (1.99 m)	231 lb (105 kg)	35 3/8 in (0.90 m)	10 in (0.25 m)	7 ft 0 1/2 in (2.15 m)	4.52 s	1.55 s	2.64 s	4.11 s	37.0 in (0.94 m)	10 ft 8 in (3.25 m)
All values from NFL Combine

Wilson was drafted by the Philadelphia Eagles in the sixth round with the 185th overall pick in the 2024 NFL draft. In week 3, Wilson recorded the first catch of his career for nine yards during a win against the New Orleans Saints. In week 10, Wilson had the first touchdown catch of his career against the Dallas Cowboys on a five-yard reception from Jalen Hurts. He had five receptions for 38 yards and a touchdown in his rookie season. Wilson won a Super Bowl championship when the Eagles defeated the Kansas City Chiefs 40–22 in Super Bowl LIX.

On August 21, 2025, it was announced that Wilson would require season-ending knee and ankle surgeries after suffering the injuries during a team practice.

On August 21, 2026, it was announced that Wilson was waived by the Philadelphia Eagles due to a lingering knee injury.

== NFL career statistics ==
Legend
	Won the Super Bowl
**Bold**	Career High

Year	Team	Games		Receiving					Rushing					Fumbles	
Year	Team	GP	GS	Rec	Yds	Avg	Lng	TD	Att	Yds	Avg	Lng	TD	Fum	Lost
2024	PHI	16	4	5	38	7.6	9	1	0	0	0	0	0	0	0
Career		16	4	5	38	7.6	9	1	0	0	0	0	0	0	0
