= Jackson He =

Chinese-born American football player (born 1997)

No. 32
- Positions: Running back, fullback

Personal information
- Born: May 1, 1997 (age 29); Shaoguan, Guangdong, China
- Listed height: 5 ft 9 in (1.75 m)
- Listed weight: 215 lb (98 kg)

Career information
- High school: Lutheran High School of San Diego (San Diego, California, U.S.)
- College: University of Jamestown (2016–2018); Arizona State (2019–2021)
- Stats at ESPN

Peizhang Jackson He (Chinese: 何佩璋; pinyin: Hé Pèizhāng; born May 1, 1997) is a Chinese former American football running back. He played college football for the Arizona State Sun Devils. He became the first Chinese-born player to play for a Power Five conference team when he appeared in a game against the UCLA Bruins on December 5, 2020. A week later, against the Arizona Wildcats, he also became the first Chinese-born player to score a touchdown at the FBS level.

== Early life ==
He was born in Shaoguan, China. He was sent by his parents to the United States at age 17 for schooling. His English name, Jackson He, takes inspiration from Michael Jackson. He attended Lutheran High School of San Diego, where he learned to play football. Although he unsuccessfully tried for the basketball team at first, he was noticed by Ron Allen, Lutheran's football coach, due to his 250-pound weight. Although initially unfamiliar with football, he stayed on the team for two years.

== College football career ==
He’s college football career began at the University of Jamestown in Jamestown, North Dakota. He was recruited to play fullback at Jamestown and redshirted his first season. In 2017, his redshirt freshman season, He rushed for 376 yards on 80 carries with one touchdown. He also caught 8 passes for 40 yards and one touchdown.

He left Jamestown in 2018 and returned to China, where he played professionally in the Chinese National Football League with the Foshan Tigers. He later enrolled at Arizona State University and became a member of its football team. He was recruited by the university's coach, Herm Edwards.

In a 2020 game against UCLA, He wore a jersey with his name in Chinese characters. On December 11, 2020, during a 70–7 rout of rival Arizona, He received four handoffs, which he ran for seven yards and a touchdown. With the score, He became the first Chinese-born player to score a touchdown in the FBS. His jersey was donated to the College Football Hall of Fame.

After not playing in 2021 due to injury, he entered the NCAA transfer portal in 2022.
