= LaDarius Henderson =

American football player (born 2001)

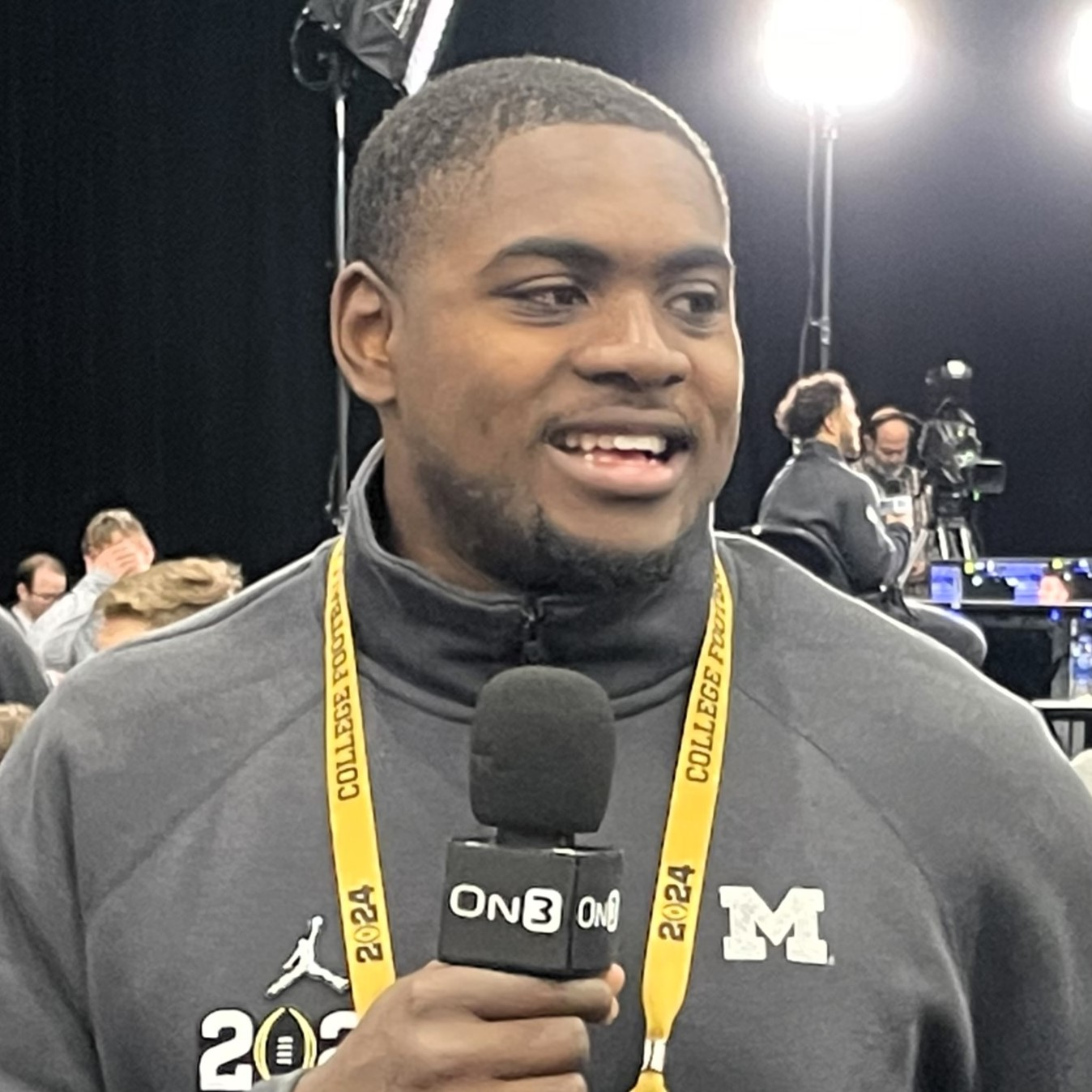
- Henderson with Michigan in 2024

Profile
- Position: Guard

Personal information
- Born: December 11, 2001 (age 24); Waxahachie, Texas, U.S.
- Listed height: 6 ft 4 in (1.93 m)
- Listed weight: 309 lb (140 kg)

Career information
- High school: Waxahachie
- College: Arizona State (2019–2022); Michigan (2023)
- NFL draft: 2024: 7th round, 249th overall pick

Career history
- Houston Texans (2024); Cleveland Browns (2025)*; Indianapolis Colts (2025)*
- * Offseason or practice squad member only

Awards and highlights
- CFP national champion (2023); First-team All-Big Ten (2023)
- Stats at Pro Football Reference

LaDarius Henderson (born December 11, 2001) is an American professional football guard. He played college football for the Arizona State Sun Devils and Michigan Wolverines. Henderson was a first-team All-Big Ten selection, helping Michigan win a national championship in 2023. He was selected by the Texans in the 2024 NFL draft.

== Early life ==
Henderson was born in Waxahachie, Texas. He did not play football until his junior year at Waxahachie High School.

== College career ==
=== Arizona State ===
Henderson played college football as a left guard and left tackle for Arizona State from 2019 to 2022. He started 29 games for Arizona State and was a team captain of the 2022 Arizona State Sun Devils football team. He broke a bone in his hand in October 2022 and missed the final six games of the 2022 season.

=== Michigan ===
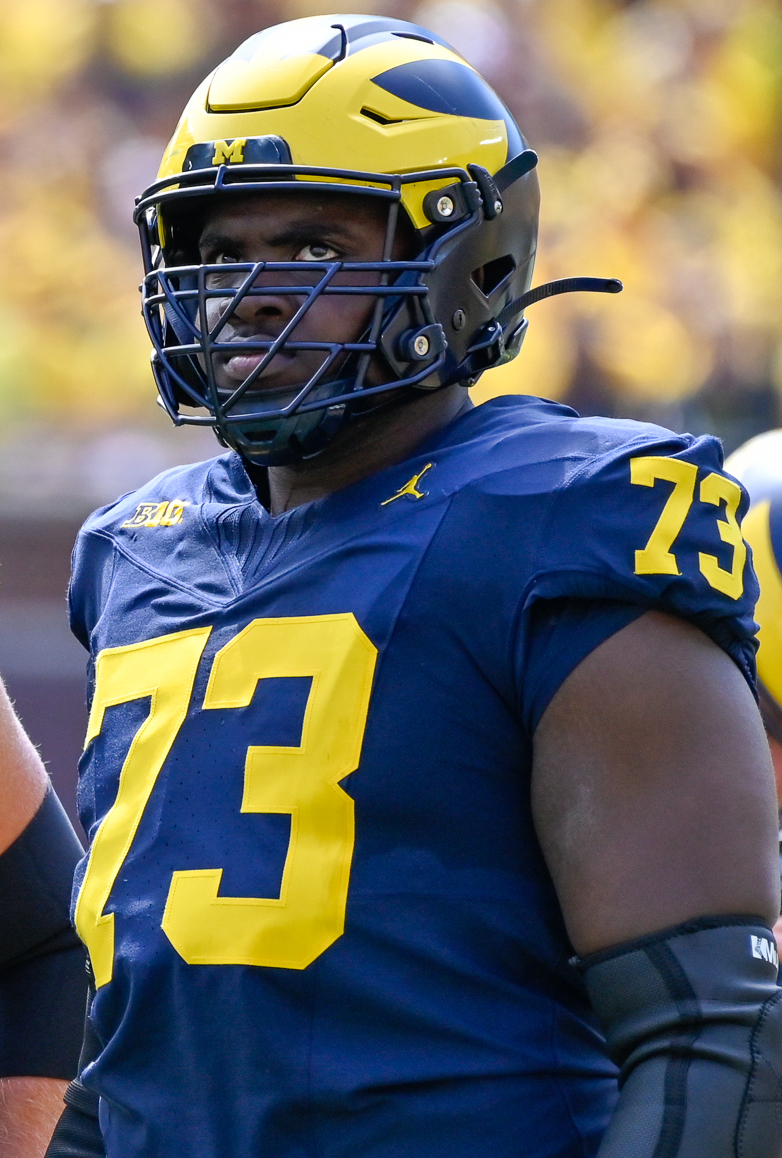
Henderson with Michigan in 2023

In December 2022, Henderson entered the NCAA transfer portal and committed to the University of Michigan. Henderson explained his transfer decision: "I really just wanted to play with the best offensive line, and I knew Michigan had that. I wanted to get a chance to play with these guys and see how they do things." He missed Michigan's spring practice while completing class work remotely at Arizona State and taking final exams in early May 2023.

In 2023, following his transfer, Henderson appeared in 14 games, starting 10 at left tackle on Michigan’s national championship team. Henderson was named First-team All-Big Ten.

== Professional career ==
Pre-draft measurables
Height	Weight	Arm length	Hand span	20-yard shuttle	Three-cone drill	Bench press
6 ft 4 1/8 in (1.93 m)	309 lb (140 kg)	35 in (0.89 m)	10 5/8 in (0.27 m)	4.72 s	8.15 s	22 reps
All values from NFL Combine/Pro Day

=== Houston Texans ===
Henderson was selected in the seventh round, 249th overall, by the Houston Texans in the 2024 NFL draft. He was placed on the reserve/non-football injury list on July 17.

On August 26, 2025, Henderson was waived by the Texans as part of final roster cuts.

=== Cleveland Browns ===
On October 1, 2025, Henderson signed with the Cleveland Browns' practice squad. He was released on October 28.

=== Indianapolis Colts ===
On December 16, 2025, Henderson was signed to the Indianapolis Colts' practice squad. He signed a reserve/future contract with Indianapolis on January 5, 2026. He was waived on June 1, 2026.
