= Jack Jones (American football) =

American football player (born 1997)

No. 25 – San Francisco 49ers
- Position: Cornerback
- Roster status: Practice squad

Personal information
- Born: December 20, 1997 (age 28); Long Beach, California, U.S.
- Listed height: 5 ft 11 in (1.80 m)
- Listed weight: 175 lb (79 kg)

Career information
- High school: Long Beach Polytechnic
- College: USC (2016–2017); Moorpark (2018); Arizona State (2019–2021)
- NFL draft: 2022: 4th round, 121st overall pick

Career history
- New England Patriots (2022–2023); Las Vegas Raiders (2023–2024); Miami Dolphins (2025); San Francisco 49ers (2026–present)

Awards and highlights
- Honorable Mention All-Pac-12 (2019)

Career NFL statistics as of 2025
- Total tackles: 213
- Forced fumbles: 3
- Fumble recoveries: 1
- Pass deflections: 33
- Interceptions: 8
- Defensive touchdowns: 4
- Stats at Pro Football Reference

Jackie K. Jones (born December 20, 1997) is an American professional football cornerback for the San Francisco 49ers of the National Football League (NFL). He played college football for the USC Trojans, Moorpark Raiders, and Arizona State Sun Devils and was selected by the New England Patriots in the fourth round of the 2022 NFL draft. Jones has also played for the Las Vegas Raiders, Miami Dolphins, and San Francisco 49ers.

== College career ==
Jones was ranked as a five–star and the #19 overall recruit by 247Sports.com coming out of high school. He committed to USC on February 3, 2016, over offers from Alabama and Texas A&M on an interview with Snoop Dogg. He became a starter for the team during his sophomore season, but was dismissed before his junior season due to legal struggles. He transferred to Moorpark College, a junior college in California in an effort to improve his grades. After improving his grades at Moorpark College, he committed to Arizona State as a three–star JUCO recruit. During his junior year for the Sun Devils, Jones played in 13 games and started in one. In the Territorial Cup against the University of Arizona, Jones recorded 2 interceptions and was subsequently named the Pac-12 Defensive Player of the week. Jones finished the 2019 season with a Pac-12 All-Conference Honorable Mention and a Pro Football Focus Pac-12 Honorable Mention.

Jones only played in 2 games in the 2020 season as a senior and recorded 5 total tackles for the year. Jones completed his B.A. in liberal arts at Arizona State in December 2020.

He returned to play for Arizona State as a graduate student in 2021 where he recorded 42 tackles including 2.5 tackles for a loss and a strip sack. Jones had 3 interceptions in 2021 with an 86-yard pick-six against Arizona on November 27. Jones received an Honorable Mention Defensive Back nomination from the Pac-12 following his 2021 season performance.

=== College statistics ===
Season	Team	GP	Tackles			Interceptions			Fumbles	
Season	Team	GP	Cmb	TfL	Sck	PD	Int	TD	FF	FR
2016	USC	13	13	0	0.0	1	0	0	0	1
2017	USC	14	40	0	0.0	7	4	0	1	1
2019	Arizona State	13	46	0	0.0	13	3	0	1	0
2020	Arizona State	2	5	0	0.0	1	0	0	0	0
2021	Arizona State	11	41	2.5	1.0	6	3	1	3	0
Total		53	145	2.5	1.0	28	10	1	5	2
Source ESPN.com

== Professional career ==
Pre-draft measurables
Height	Weight	Arm length	Hand span	Wingspan	40-yard dash	10-yard split	20-yard split	20-yard shuttle	Three-cone drill	Vertical jump	Broad jump	Bench press
5 ft 10 3/4 in (1.80 m)	171 lb (78 kg)	30 3/4 in (0.78 m)	8 7/8 in (0.23 m)	6 ft 2 in (1.88 m)	4.51 s	1.53 s	2.60 s	4.13 s	6.90 s	35.0 in (0.89 m)	10 ft 4 in (3.15 m)	11 reps
All values from NFL Combine/Pro Day

=== New England Patriots ===
==== 2022 ====
Jones was selected by the New England Patriots in the fourth round (121st overall) of the 2022 NFL draft. On June 9, 2022, he officially signed his rookie deal with the Patriots. The deal involved a $746,984 signing bonus and four years totaling $3.6 million in salary.

Jones made his first career start in the Patriots' Week 4 game against the Green Bay Packers. In the first half of the game, Jones had a forced fumble and fumble recovery as well as a pick-six off Aaron Rodgers in the 27-24 overtime loss. Jones became just the fourth player in NFL history to return an interception thrown by Rodgers for a touchdown, joining Tanard Jackson, William Jackson III, and Jamel Dean.

In Week 5 against the Detroit Lions, Jones recorded his second interception of the season off a throw by Jared Goff. Through the first five weeks, Jones was rated the number one cornerback in single-coverage by Pro Football Focus with a rating of 92. He played in 13 games with two starts, recording 30 tackles, two interceptions, and six passes defended. On December 31, 2022, Jones was placed on season–ending injured reserve.

==== 2023 ====
Jones entered the 2023 season as a starting cornerback, however in practice prior to Week 1, he suffered a hamstring injury. He was placed on injured reserve on September 9, 2023. He was activated on October 21.

The night before the Patriots Week 9 game vs the Washington Commanders, Jones missed curfew at the team hotel and was benched and played a reduced role. He also played a career-low 10 snaps vs the Indianapolis Colts the next week. He was waived the next day on November 13, 2023.

=== Las Vegas Raiders ===
On November 14, 2023, Jones was claimed off waivers by the Las Vegas Raiders, reuniting with former high school and college coach Antonio Pierce. In a Week 15 game against the Los Angeles Chargers, Jones snagged a one-handed interception on an errant screen pass from Chargers quarterback Easton Stick. He returned it for a touchdown, capping off Las Vegas’ scoring in a stunning 63-21 victory. Then the next week on Christmas Day, in a Week 16 victory against Kansas City Chiefs, he intercepted a Patrick Mahomes pass, returning it for his second touchdown in two weeks. Following the touchdown, in celebration, Jones offered the intercepted ball to a young Chiefs fan. Jones then snatched the ball back after the child reached out to grab it. The clip went viral, leading Jones to explain that he wasn’t trying to steal the ball from the child but instead from an adult fan standing behind the child and his parents attempting to steal it.

On April 6, 2025, Jones was released by the Raiders.

=== Miami Dolphins ===
On July 26, 2025, Jones signed with the Miami Dolphins. On November 16, Jones intercepted a pass on the first play of overtime against the Washington Commanders, giving the Dolphins excellent field position and setting up the game-winning field goal. He started all 17 games during the regular season, recording an interception, six pass deflections, two forced fumbles, and 77 combined tackles.

=== San Francisco 49ers ===
On April 13, 2026, Jones signed with the San Francisco 49ers on a one-year contract. On October 28, he was released. On November 11, Jones was re-signed to the practice squad.

== NFL career statistics ==
Legend
**Bold**	Career high

=== Regular season ===
Year	Team	Games		Tackles					Interceptions						Fumbles				
Year	Team	GP	GS	Cmb	Solo	Ast	Sck	TFL	Int	Yds	Avg	Lng	TD	PD	FF	Fum	FR	Yds	TD
2022	NE	13	2	30	25	5	0.0	3	2	40	20.0	**40**	1	6	1	0	**1**	0	0
2023	NE	5	0	12	8	4	0.0	0	0	0	0.0	0	0	1	0	0	0	0	0
2023	LV	7	3	25	20	5	0.0	1	2	49	**24.5**	33	**2**	4	0	0	0	0	0
2024	LV	17	16	69	**52**	17	0.0	3	**3**	**53**	17.7	29	1	**16**	0	0	0	0	0
2025	MIA	17	17	**77**	49	**28**	0.0	**4**	1	7	7.0	7	0	6	**2**	0	0	0	0
Career		59	38	213	154	59	0.0	11	8	149	18.6	40	4	33	3	0	1	0	0

== Personal life ==
On June 8, 2018, Jones was arrested at a Panda Express in Santa Paula, California, for commercial burglary. He pled guilty to commercial burglary, a second-degree misdemeanor, and served 45 days of house arrest.

Jones was arrested on June 16, 2023, at Boston's Logan Airport when two loaded guns were found in his carry-on baggage by Transportation Security Administration agents. Massachusetts State Police said that Jones would face multiple charges, including possession of a concealed weapon and ammunition in an airport, as well as possession of a large-capacity magazine. Jones entered a not guilty plea on nine separate weapons charges during his initial court hearing on June 20, 2023. He posted a $30,000 bail and was scheduled to return to court on August 18, 2023. Jones did not make any comments and would not answer questions from the media after the hearing, but his attorney, Rosemary C. Scapicchio, told the media “He had no intention of bringing any guns onto an airport that day.” The Patriots released a statement acknowledging his arrest but declined further comment.

On September 5, 2023, all weapons charges were dropped by the Suffolk County District Attorney when Jones agreed to serve one year of pretrial probation and 48 hours of community service.
