= Omarr Norman-Lott =

American football player (born 2002)

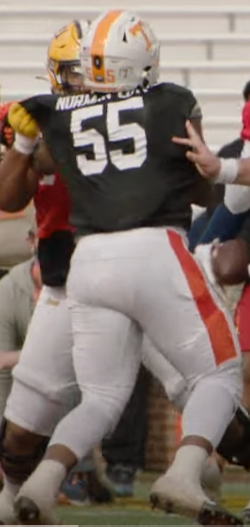
- Norman-Lott at the 2025 Senior Bowl

No. 55 – Kansas City Chiefs
- Position: Defensive tackle
- Roster status: Active

Personal information
- Born: March 11, 2002 (age 24)
- Listed height: 6 ft 3 in (1.91 m)
- Listed weight: 315 lb (143 kg)

Career information
- High school: Grant Union (Sacramento, California)
- College: Arizona State (2020–2022); Tennessee (2023–2024)
- NFL draft: 2025: 2nd round, 63rd overall pick

Career history
- Kansas City Chiefs (2025–present)
- Stats at Pro Football Reference

Omarr Norman-Lott (born March 11, 2002) is an American professional football defensive tackle for the Kansas City Chiefs of the National Football League (NFL). He played college football for the Arizona State Sun Devils and Tennessee Volunteers. Norman-Lott was selected by the Chiefs in the second round of the 2025 NFL draft.

== Early life ==
Norman-Lott grew up in North Highlands, California and attended Grant Union High School in Sacramento, California. He was rated as a three-star recruit and committed to play college football for the Arizona State Sun Devils over numerous Power 4 offers.

== College career ==
=== Arizona State ===
As a freshman in 2020, Norman-Lott recorded just one tackle. In 2021, he recorded 30 tackles with three and a half being for a loss, and two sacks. Norman-Lott finished the 2022 season with 14 tackles with three being for a loss, two sacks, and two pass deflections. He entered his name into the NCAA transfer portal after the season.

=== Tennessee ===
Norman-Lott transferred to play for the Tennessee Volunteers. In week 4 of the 2023 season, he was suspended for the first half of their matchup against UTSA, but once he returned he notched his first sack as a Volunteer. Norman-Lott finished the season with 26 tackles with six being for a loss, five and a half sacks, and a fumble recovery.

== Professional career ==
Pre-draft measurables
Height	Weight	Arm length	Hand span	Wingspan	40-yard dash	10-yard split	20-yard split	Vertical jump	Broad jump
6 ft 1 7/8 in (1.88 m)	291 lb (132 kg)	33 3/4 in (0.86 m)	10 3/4 in (0.27 m)	6 ft 8 1/2 in (2.04 m)	5.17 s	1.79 s	3.00 s	31.5 in (0.80 m)	9 ft 5 in (2.87 m)
All values from NFL Combine/Pro Day

Norman-Lott was selected in the second round with the 63rd pick of the 2025 NFL draft by the Kansas City Chiefs. He made five appearances (one start) for the Chiefs during his rookie campaign, recording one sack and five combined tackles. On October 20, 2025, Norman-Lott was placed on season-ending injured reserve after suffering a torn ACL in Week 7 against the Las Vegas Raiders.

== Personal life ==
Norman-Lott is the nephew of Denver Broncos defensive line coach Jamar Cain.
