= Trenton Bourguet =

American football coach & former player

Current position
- Title: Assistant Running backs coach
- Team: Arizona State
- Conference: Big 12

Playing career
- 2019–2024: Arizona State
- Position: Quarterback

Coaching career (HC unless noted)
- 2025–present: Arizona State (assistant)

Trenton Bourguet is a former American college football quarterback and a current assistant coach for the Arizona State.

== Early life ==
Bourguet attended Marana High School in Tucson, Arizona, where he completed 443 of 644 pass attempts for 7,612 yards and 86 touchdowns with 23 interceptions. He also rushed for 894 yards and 13 touchdowns and hauled in 11 receptions for 114 yards and one touchdown. On defense, Bourguet notched 19 tackles, three pass deflections, and three interceptions. He decided to walk on to play college football at Arizona State University.

== College career ==
In the COVID shortened 2020 season, Bourguet only played in one game where he completed one of two passes for 24 yards. In 2021, he went seven for ten for 91 yards and a touchdown and rushed for seven yards. In week 6 of the 2022 season, Bourguet replaced injured starter Emory Jones and completed 15 of 21 pass attempts for 182 yards and three touchdowns with one interception in an upset win over #21 Washington, earning Manning quarterback of the week honors. The following week, he got his first career start versus Colorado. In the game, Bourguet completed 32 of 43 passes for 435 yards and three touchdowns with one interception in a win over Colorado. He finished the 2022 season starting in five games, where he completed 145 of 203 passes for 1,490 yards and 11 touchdowns with five interceptions. Bourguet got his first start of the 2023 season in week 3 against Fresno State, but left the game in the first quarter with an injury.

Pre-draft measurables
Height	Weight
5 ft 11 1/4 in (1.81 m)	185 lb (84 kg)
Values from Pro Day

== Coaching career ==
In February 2025, Bourguet was announced to be the assistant running backs coach for the Arizona State Sun Devils.

== Personal life ==
Bourguet is the brother of BYU quarterback Treyson Bourguet.
