= Ed Woods =

American football player (born 2002)

No. 10 – Michigan State Spartans
- Position: Defensive back
- Class: Senior

Personal information
- Born: March 11, 2002 (age 24)
- Listed height: 6 ft 0 in (1.83 m)
- Listed weight: 170 lb (77 kg)

Career information
- High school: McClymonds (Oakland, California)
- College: Arizona State (2020–2023); Michigan State (2024–present)
- Stats at ESPN

Edward Woods (born March 11, 2002) is an American college football cornerback for the Michigan State Spartans. He previously played for the Arizona State Sun Devils.

== Early life ==
Woods attended McClymonds High School in Oakland, California. He was rated as a three-star recruit and received offers from schools such as Arizona State, USC, Arizona, Washington State and Tulane, ultimately committing to play college football for the Arizona State Sun Devils.

== College career ==
=== Arizona State ===
In Woods' first two seasons in 2020 and 2021, he combined to play in five games, making five tackles. In 2022, he played in eight games, where he notched 28 tackles, a sack, six pass deflections, and a forced fumble. During the 2023 season, Woods played all 12 games for the Sun Devils, tallying 33 tackles, four pass deflections, an interception, and two forced fumbles. After the conclusion of the 2023 season, Woods entered his name into the NCAA transfer portal.

=== Michigan State ===
Woods transferred to play for the Michigan State Spartans.
