= Curtis Hodges =

American football player (born 1999)

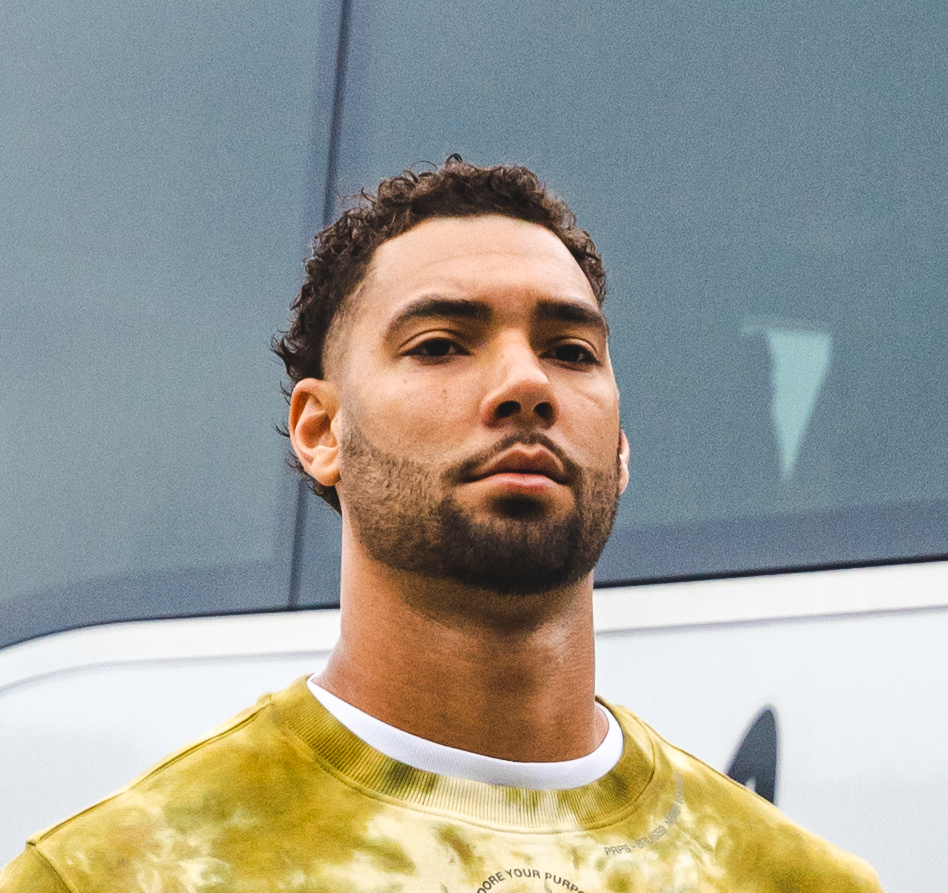
- Hodges in 2022

Dallas Renegades
- Position: Tight end
- Roster status: Active

Personal information
- Born: July 3, 1999 (age 27); Mesa, Arizona, U.S.
- Listed height: 6 ft 8 in (2.03 m)
- Listed weight: 255 lb (116 kg)

Career information
- High school: Mountain View (Mesa)
- College: Arizona State (2017–2021)
- NFL draft: 2022: undrafted

Career history
- Washington Commanders (2022–2023); Carolina Panthers (2024)*; Arlington / Dallas Renegades (2025–present)
- * Offseason or practice squad member only
- Stats at Pro Football Reference

Curtis Hodges Jr. (born July 3, 1999) is an American professional football tight end for the Dallas Renegades of the United Football League (UFL). He played college football for the Arizona State Sun Devils and was signed by the Washington Commanders as an undrafted free agent in 2022.

== College career ==
A 3-star wide receiver recruit, Hodges committed to play college football at Arizona State over an offer from Iowa State. Hodges played at Arizona State from 2017 to 2021, alternating between wide receiver and tight end, recording 36 receptions for 601 yards and four touchdowns in his career.

== Professional career ==
Pre-draft measurables
Height	Weight	Arm length	Hand span	Wingspan	40-yard dash	10-yard split	20-yard split	20-yard shuttle	Three-cone drill	Vertical jump	Broad jump	Bench press
6 ft 7 3/4 in (2.03 m)	257 lb (117 kg)	34 1/2 in (0.88 m)	9 5/8 in (0.24 m)	6 ft 11 1/4 in (2.11 m)	4.85 s	1.69 s	2.79 s	4.28 s	7.14 s	34.5 in (0.88 m)	9 ft 9 in (2.97 m)	12 reps
All values from NFL Combine/Pro Day

=== Washington Commanders ===
He was signed by the Washington Commanders as an undrafted free agent to play tight end on May 1, 2022. He was placed on injured reserve on September 1, 2022. Hodges made the team's final roster for the 2023 season, but did not appear in a game and was placed on injured reserve due to a back injury on December 15, 2023. He was released on January 8, 2024.

=== Carolina Panthers ===
On August 1, 2024, Hodges signed with the Carolina Panthers, but was waived with an injury designation two days later.

=== Arlington/Dallas Renegades ===
On December 4, 2024, Hodges signed with the Arlington Renegades of the United Football League (UFL).

On November 13, 2026, Hodges re-signed with the Renegades.
