= Aashari Crosswell =

American football player (born 2000)

No. 16 – Potsdam Royals
- Position: Safety
- Roster status: Active

Personal information
- Born: August 8, 2000 (age 26); Los Angeles, California
- Listed height: 6 ft 0 in (1.83 m)
- Listed weight: 205 lb (93 kg)

Career information
- High school: Long Beach Poly (Long Beach, California)
- College: Arizona State
- NFL draft: 2021: undrafted

Career history
- Seattle Seahawks (2021)*; New Orleans Breakers (2022); Potsdam Royals (2024–present)
- * Offseason or practice squad member only

Awards and highlights
- 2× German Bowl champion (XLV), XLVI); Second-team All-Pac-12 (2018)

Aashari Crosswell (born August 8, 2000) is an American football safety for the Potsdam Royals. He played college football for Arizona State.

== Early life ==
Crosswell was born and raised in Los Angeles, California, he attended the Long Beach Polytechnic High School at Long Beach, California where he committed to football from there, before choosing to commit to Arizona State, he received offers from other colleges such as USC, Nebraska and Auburn. In December 2020 he declared for the 2021 NFL draft.

== Professional career ==
=== Seattle Seahawks ===
Crosswell signed with the Seattle Seahawks as an undrafted free agent on May 13, 2021. He was released during roster cuts on August 31, 2021.

=== New Orleans Breakers ===
On March 10, 2022, Crosswell was drafted by the New Orleans Breakers of the United States Football League in the 2022 USFL supplemental draft. He was transferred to the team's practice squad before the start of the regular season on April 16, 2022, and remained on the inactive roster on April 22. He was transferred to the active roster on April 30. He became a free agent when his contract expired on December 31, 2022.
