= Chase Lucas =

American football player (born 1997)

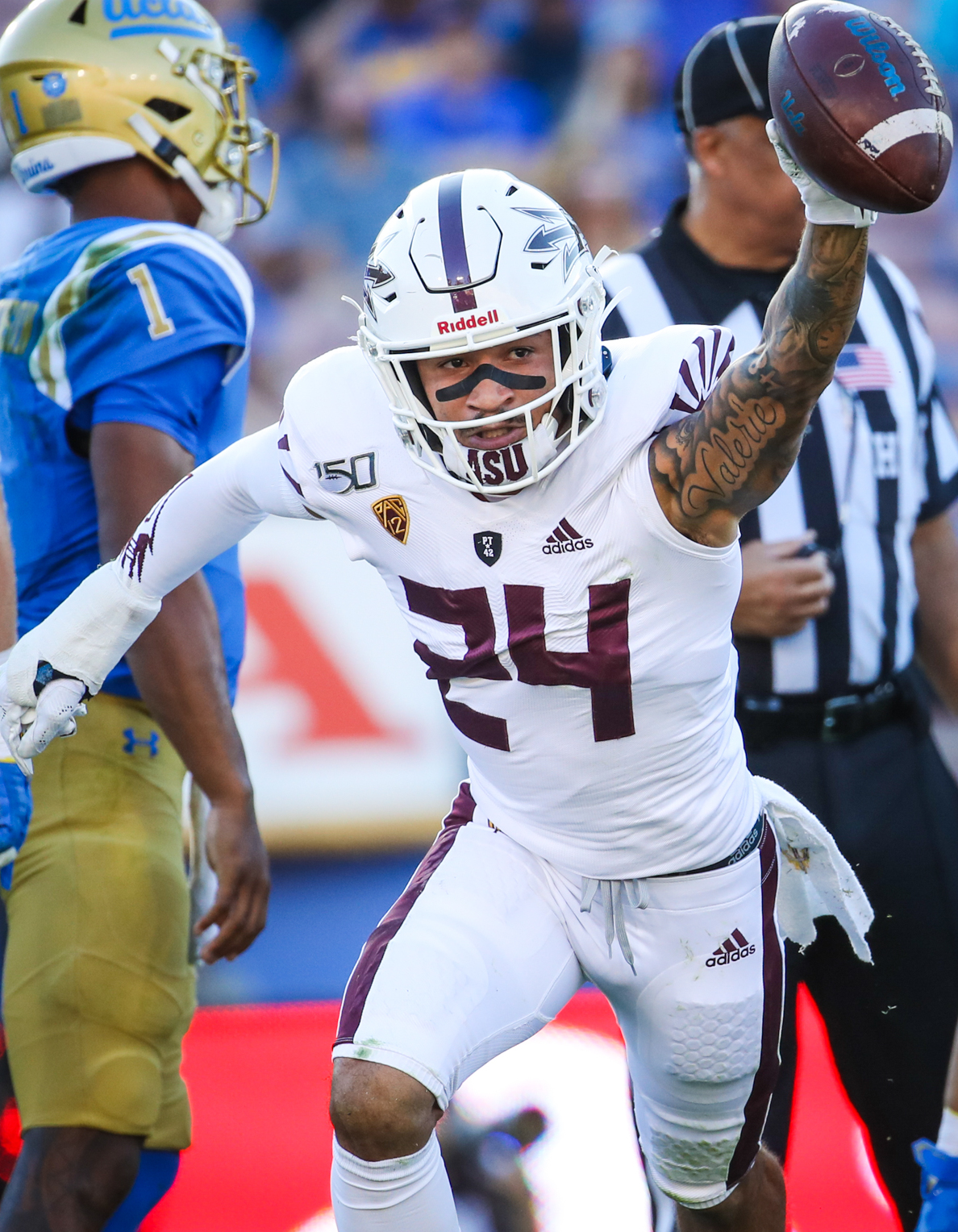
- Lucas with the Arizona State Sun Devils in 2019

Profile
- Position: Cornerback

Personal information
- Born: March 4, 1997 (age 29); Chandler, Arizona, U.S.
- Listed height: 5 ft 11 in (1.80 m)
- Listed weight: 184 lb (83 kg)

Career information
- High school: Chandler
- College: Arizona State (2016–2021)
- NFL draft: 2022: 7th round, 237th overall pick

Career history
- Detroit Lions (2022–2023); San Francisco 49ers (2024–2025); Tampa Bay Buccaneers (2026)*
- * Offseason or practice squad member only

Awards and highlights
- 2× Second-team All-Pac-12 (2017, 2020)

Career NFL statistics as of 2025
- Total tackles: 15
- Pass deflections: 1
- Stats at Pro Football Reference

Chase Lucas (born March 4, 1997) is an American professional football cornerback. He played college football for the Arizona State Sun Devils.

== Early life ==
Lucas played at Chandler High School in Chandler, Arizona. He started at running back as a sophomore. As a junior, Lucas helped Chandler win its first state championship since 1949. The team featured future NFL players N'Keal Harry and Bryce Perkins. Lucas contributed 113 rushing yards and 37 receiving yards in the 28–7 win over Chandler Hamilton. He was selected to play in the U.S. Army All American Bowl.

== College career ==
During Lucas' first year as a true freshman, ASU coach Todd Graham considered playing Lucas for his talent, but choose not to so that Lucas could learn. After taking a redshirt year, Lucas was able to play as a redshirt freshman and was named to the USA Today All-Freshman team and the All-Pac-12 Conference Second Team. He was the only freshman to earn all-conference honors in Pac-12. During spring training before his sophomore year, Lucas was slated to be the number 1 corner for Arizona state. His final season, Lucas was captain of the Sun Devils and was an honorable mention all-conference selection.

== Professional career ==
Pre-draft measurables
| Height | Weight | Arm length | Hand span | Wingspan | 40-yard dash | 10-yard split | 20-yard split | 20-yard shuttle | Three-cone drill | Vertical jump | Broad jump | Bench press |
|---|---|---|---|---|---|---|---|---|---|---|---|---|
| 5 ft 11 1/4 in (1.81 m) | 180 lb (82 kg) | 31 7/8 in (0.81 m) | 9 1/4 in (0.23 m) | 6 ft 2 1/2 in (1.89 m) | 4.48 s | 1.52 s | 2.61 s | 4.16 s | 6.78 s | 39.0 in (0.99 m) | 10 ft 8 in (3.25 m) | 12 reps |
All values from NFL Combine/Pro Day

=== Detroit Lions ===
Lucas was selected by the Detroit Lions in the seventh round, 237th overall, of the 2022 NFL draft. He was placed on injured reserve on December 10, 2022.

On August 29, 2023, Lucas was waived by the Lions and re-signed to the practice squad. On September 16, 2023, Lucas was signed to the active roster. He was released on December 28 and re-signed to the practice squad. He was promoted back to the active roster on January 13, 2024.

=== San Francisco 49ers ===
On March 18, 2024, Lucas signed a one–year contract with the San Francisco 49ers. He was waived on August 27, and re-signed to the practice squad. Lucas signed a reserve/future contract with San Francisco on January 6, 2025.

Lucas made 15 appearances for San Francisco during the 2025 season, recording one pass deflection and nine combined tackles.

=== Tampa Bay Buccaneers ===
On April 10, 2026, Lucas signed a one–year contract with the Tampa Bay Buccaneers. He was placed on injured reserve on August 9, and later released.

== NFL career statistics ==
Legend
| **Bold** | Career high |

=== Regular season ===
| Year | Team | Games | | Tackles | | | | | Interceptions | | | | | | Fumbles | | | | |
| Year | Team | GP | GS | Cmb | Solo | Ast | Sck | TFL | Int | Yds | Avg | Lng | TD | PD | FF | Fum | FR | Yds | TD |
|---|---|---|---|---|---|---|---|---|---|---|---|---|---|---|---|---|---|---|---|
| 2022 | DET | 6 | 0 | 3 | 1 | 2 | 0.0 | 0 | 0 | 0 | 0.0 | 0 | 0 | 0 | 0 | 0 | 0 | 0 | 0 |
| 2023 | DET | 12 | 0 | 3 | 2 | 1 | 0.0 | 0 | 0 | 0 | 0.0 | 0 | 0 | 0 | 0 | 0 | 0 | 0 | 0 |
| 2025 | SF | 15 | 0 | **9** | **6** | **3** | 0.0 | 0 | 0 | 0 | 0.0 | 0 | 0 | **1** | 0 | 0 | 0 | 0 | 0 |
| Career | | 33 | 0 | 15 | 9 | 6 | 0.0 | 0 | 0 | 0 | 0.0 | 0 | 0 | 1 | 0 | 0 | 0 | 0 | 0 |

=== Postseason ===
| Year | Team | Games | | Tackles | | | | | Interceptions | | | | | | Fumbles | | | | |
| Year | Team | GP | GS | Cmb | Solo | Ast | Sck | TFL | Int | Yds | Avg | Lng | TD | PD | FF | Fum | FR | Yds | TD |
|---|---|---|---|---|---|---|---|---|---|---|---|---|---|---|---|---|---|---|---|
| 2023 | DET | 3 | 0 | 0 | 0 | 0 | 0.0 | 0 | 0 | 0 | 0.0 | 0 | 0 | 0 | 0 | 0 | 0 | 0 | 0 |
| 2025 | SF | 1 | 0 | 0 | 0 | 0 | 0.0 | 0 | 0 | 0 | 0.0 | 0 | 0 | 0 | 0 | 0 | 0 | 0 | 0 |
| Career | | 4 | 0 | 0 | 0 | 0 | 0.0 | 0 | 0 | 0 | 0.0 | 0 | 0 | 0 | 0 | 0 | 0 | 0 | 0 |
