= DJ Davidson =

American football player (born 1997)

No. 77
- Position: Defensive tackle

Personal information
- Born: September 19, 1997 (age 29); Mesa, Arizona, U.S.
- Listed height: 6 ft 5 in (1.96 m)
- Listed weight: 320 lb (145 kg)

Career information
- High school: Desert Ridge (Mesa)
- College: Arizona State (2017–2021)
- NFL draft: 2022: 5th round, 147th overall pick

Career history
- New York Giants (2022–2025); Washington Commanders (2026)*
- * Offseason or practice squad member only

Awards and highlights
- Second-team All-Pac-12 (2021)

Career NFL statistics
- Tackles: 49
- Sacks: 2.5
- Fumble recoveries: 2
- Pass deflections: 3
- Stats at Pro Football Reference

Devonta "DJ" Davidson (born September 19, 1997) is an American former professional football player who was a defensive tackle in the National Football League (NFL). Davidson played college football for the Arizona State Sun Devils and was selected by the New York Giants in the fifth round of the 2022 NFL draft.

== Early life ==
Davidson played for Desert Ridge as a defensive tackle. As a junior he recorded 57 tackles, four sacks, and two forced fumbles. As a senior he played in 13 games, recording 67 total tackles, 19.5 tackles for loss, 5.5 sacks, four forced fumbles, and two fumble recoveries, including one returned for a touchdown, and led his team to the state championship game his senior season. Scouts rated him as a three-star prospect.

== College career ==
Davidson played for Arizona State. As a freshman he suffered a season ending injury and only played 8 games with 10 tackles, 3.5 tackles for loss, and two sacks. As a sophomore he started 12 of 13 games and had 51 tackles, 4 tackles for loss, 1.5 sacks, and 1 touchdown. As a junior he had 15 tackles and 1 sack. His senior year he had 57 tackles, 6 tackles for loss, with 4 pass deflections, and was named the Curley Culp Outstanding defensive linemen.

== Professional career ==
Pre-draft measurables
Height	Weight	Arm length	Hand span	Wingspan	40-yard dash	10-yard split	20-yard split	20-yard shuttle	Three-cone drill	Vertical jump	Broad jump	Bench press
6 ft 3 3/8 in (1.91 m)	327 lb (148 kg)	33 in (0.84 m)	10 1/8 in (0.26 m)	6 ft 8 5/8 in (2.05 m)	5.22 s	1.83 s	2.95 s	4.71 s	7.60 s	28.5 in (0.72 m)	7 ft 11 in (2.41 m)	23 reps
All values from NFL Combine/Pro Day

=== New York Giants ===
Davidson was selected by the New York Giants with the 147th pick in the fifth round of the 2022 NFL draft. On October 11, 2022, Davidson was placed on injured reserve after he tore his ACL against the Green Bay Packers in Week 5.

In Weeks 5 of the 2024 season against the Seattle Seahawks, Davidson recorded two sacks on Geno Smith. Davidson entered the 2025 season as one of New York's backup defensive linemen. In 15 appearances for the team, he recorded one pass deflection and nine combined tackles. On December 27, 2025, he was placed on injured reserve due to a neck injury and a concussion.

=== Washington Commanders ===
Davidson signed with the Washington Commanders on March 31, 2026. He announced his retirement on August 8.
