= Frank Darby =

American football player (born 1997)

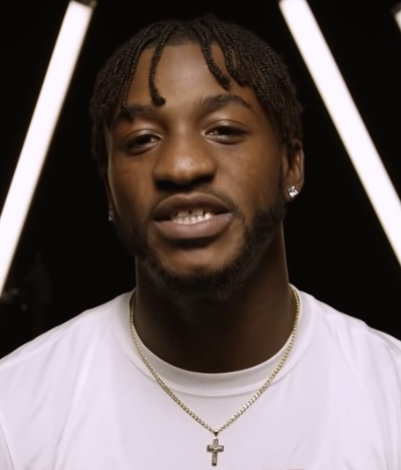
- Darby in 2021

No. 3 – St. Louis Battlehawks
- Position: Wide receiver
- Roster status: Active

Personal information
- Born: September 8, 1997 (age 29); Jersey City, New Jersey, U.S.
- Listed height: 6 ft 0 in (1.83 m)
- Listed weight: 196 lb (89 kg)

Career information
- High school: Lincoln (Jersey City)
- College: Arizona State (2016–2020)
- NFL draft: 2021: 6th round, 187th overall pick

Career history
- Atlanta Falcons (2021–2023); San Francisco 49ers (2024)*; St. Louis Battlehawks (2025–present)
- * Offseason or practice squad member only

Career NFL statistics as of 2023
- Receptions: 2
- Receiving yards: 29
- Stats at Pro Football Reference

Frank Darby (born September 8, 1997) is an American professional football wide receiver for the St. Louis Battlehawks of the United Football League (UFL). He played college football at Arizona State. He was drafted in the sixth round of the 2021 NFL draft by the Atlanta Falcons.

== Early life ==
Darby grew up in Jersey City, New Jersey, and attended Lincoln High School. Darby was named first-team All-State in 2016 as a senior after 35 receptions for 957 yards and 10 touchdowns on offense and 27 tackles, one interception and three forced fumbles on defense. Darby was rated a three star recruit and initially committed to play college football at Iowa. After initially not qualifying to sign with Iowa due to a low SAT score, he chose Arizona State over offers from Rutgers and Boston College.

== College career ==
Darby redshirted his true freshman season. He finished his redshirt sophomore season with 21 catches for 421 yards and two touchdowns. As a redshirt junior, he caught 31 passes for 616 yards and eight touchdowns. Darby was limited by injury as a senior and appeared in two of the Sun Devils' four games in the COVID-19 shortened Pac-12 Conference season, catching six passes for 46 yards and one touchdown. Darby finished his collegiate career with 1,317 receiving yards on 67 receptions with 13 touchdowns.

== Professional career ==
Pre-draft measurables
Height	Weight	Arm length	Hand span	Wingspan	40-yard dash	10-yard split	20-yard split	20-yard shuttle	Three-cone drill	Vertical jump	Broad jump	Bench press
6 ft 0 in (1.83 m)	201 lb (91 kg)	31 3/4 in (0.81 m)	9 3/8 in (0.24 m)	6 ft 2 7/8 in (1.90 m)	4.59 s	1.59 s	2.61 s	4.23 s	7.15 s	34.5 in (0.88 m)	9 ft 9 in (2.97 m)	19 reps
All values from Pro Day

=== Atlanta Falcons ===
Darby was selected by the Atlanta Falcons in the sixth round with the 187th pick in the 2021 NFL draft. He signed his four-year rookie contract with Atlanta on June 15, 2021. Darby made his NFL debut in Week 5 against the New York Jets, playing on special teams. He caught a 14-yard pass from Josh Rosen for his first career reception on November 14, 2021, in a 43–3 loss to the Dallas Cowboys in Week 10.

On August 30, 2022, Darby was waived by the Falcons and re-signed to the practice squad. He was promoted to the active roster on November 23, 2022.

On August 14, 2023, Darby was waived by the Falcons. On October 3, 2023, he was signed to the Falcons practice squad. His contract expired when the teams season ended January 7, 2024.

=== San Francisco 49ers ===
On July 27, 2024, Darby signed a one-year contract with the San Francisco 49ers. He was waived with an injury designation on August 12.

=== St. Louis Battlehawks ===
On February 12, 2025, Darby signed with the St. Louis Battlehawks of the United Football League (UFL).

On January 13, 2026, Darby was drafted by the Battlehawks.
