= Dual-threat quarterback =

Quarterback playstyle in gridiron football

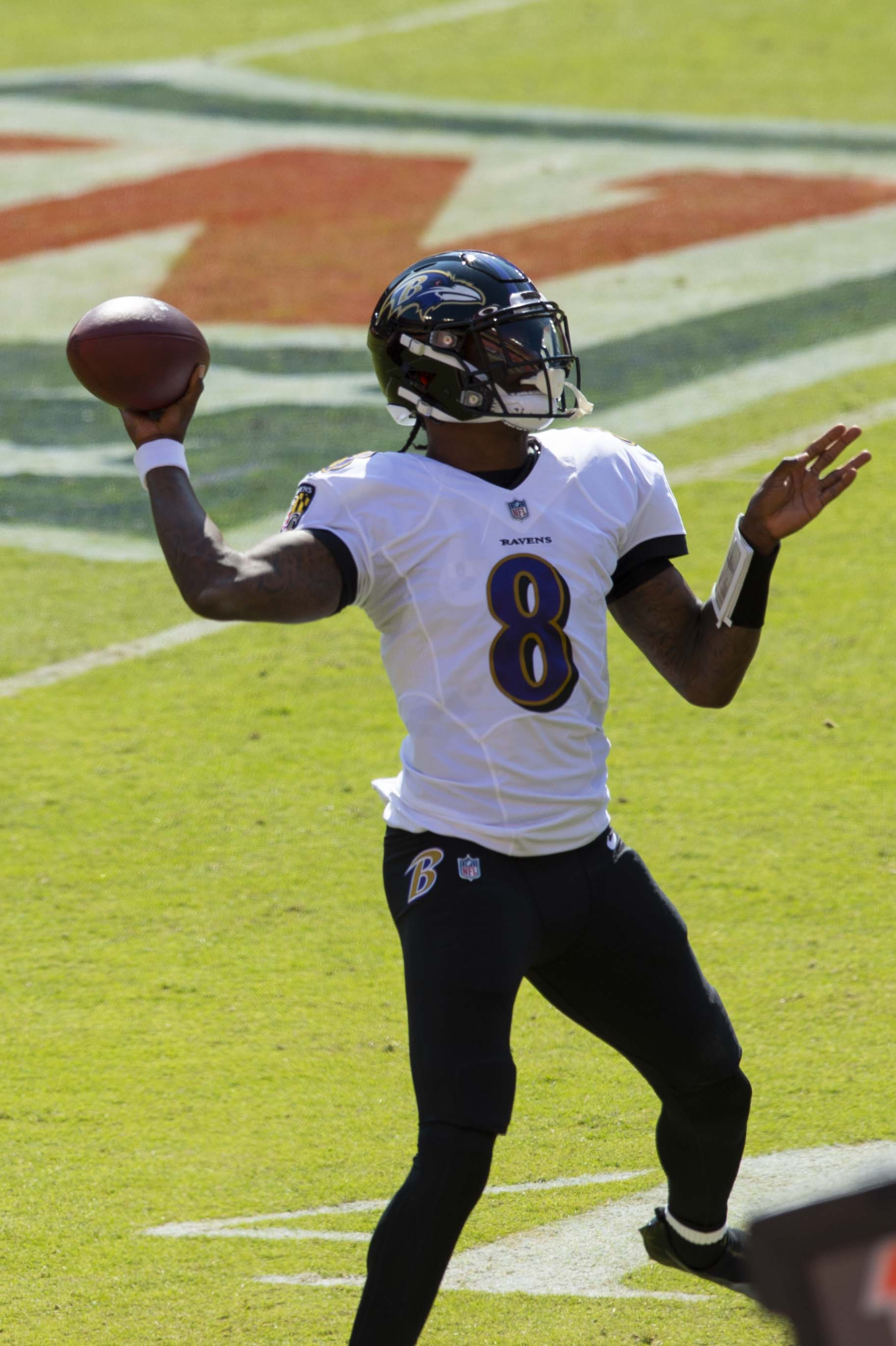
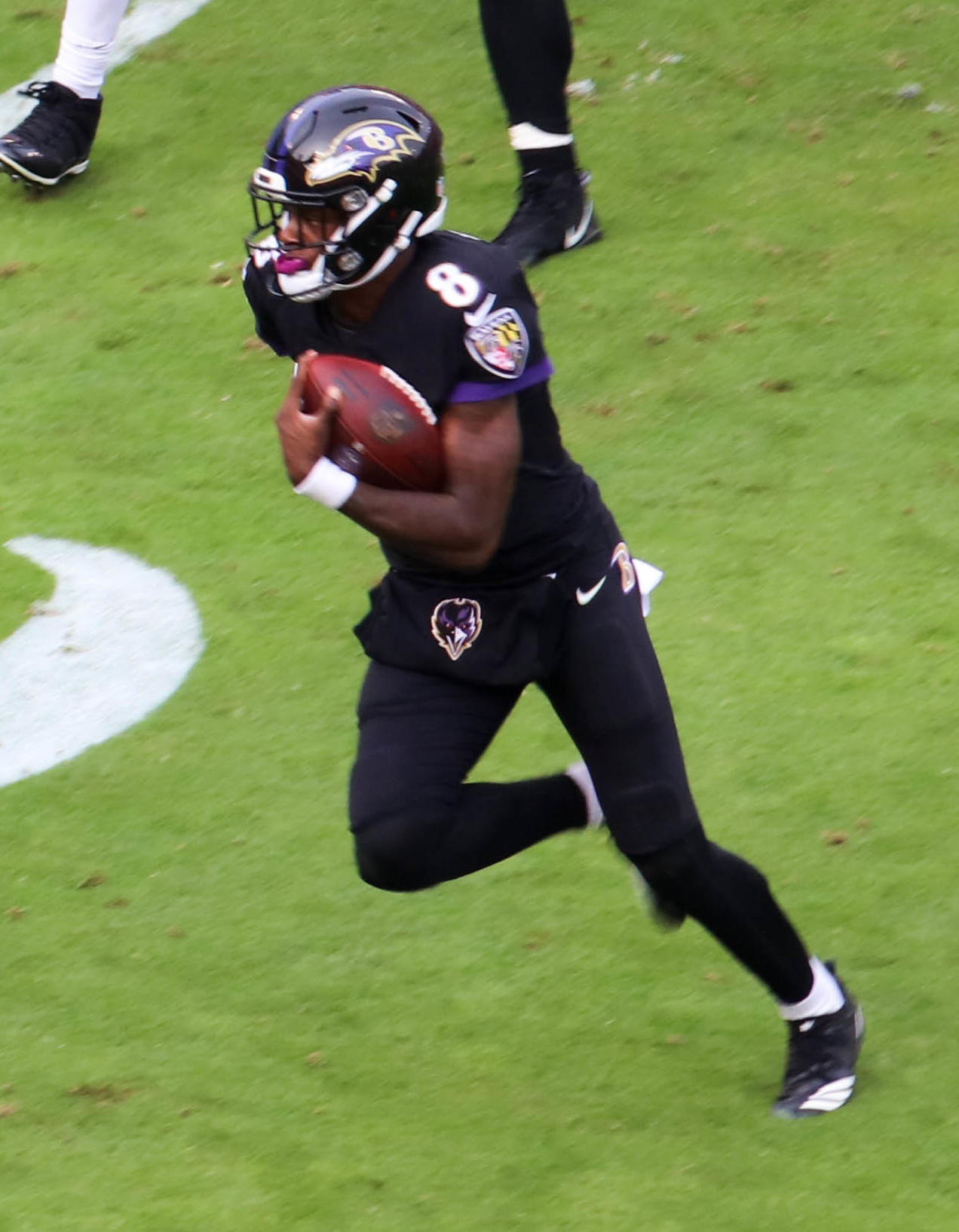
Lamar Jackson has won two NFL MVP awards for his ability to both pass and run with the ball effectively.

In gridiron football, a dual-threat quarterback is a quarterback (QB) who is adept at both passing and running with the ball. With the rise of several blitz-heavy defensive schemes and faster defensive players, the importance of a mobile quarterback has been redefined. While arm power, accuracy, and pocket presence—the ability to successfully operate from within the "pocket" formed by his blockers—are still the most important quarterback virtues, the ability to elude or run past defenders creates an additional threat that allows greater flexibility in the team's passing and running game.

College football teams employed option offenses earlier and more commonly than offenses in the National Football League (NFL). An option offense allows the quarterback to either hand the ball off, run it himself, or pitch it to the running back (RB). In the college game, many schools employ several plays that are designed for the quarterback to run with the ball. Reggie Collier was an early example of a dual-threat in college, with Brian Mitchell and Charlie Ward being other examples of 20th-century dual-threats. In the 21st-century, Tim Tebow emerged as both an effective runner and passer with the football, being widely regarded as one of the best dual-threats in college football history.

For much of the NFL's modern existence, quarterbacks running with the football was less common and often came in the form of the quarterback sneak. However, there was still some of an emphasis on being mobile enough to escape a heavy pass rush. Historically, dual-threat quarterbacks in the NFL were uncommon through the AFL–NFL merger, although Tobin Rote and Fran Tarkenton proved to be successful scrambling quarterbacks. Players like Randall Cunningham, John Elway, and Steve Young had success running in the 1980s and 1990s. Steve McNair and Donovan McNabb followed in the late 1990s into the mid-2000s. Michael Vick is often credited as having ushered dual-threat quarterbacking into the sport's mainstream in the 2000s. In the 2010s, quarterbacks with dual-threat capabilities became increasingly more common and sought after, with more recent ones such as Cam Newton, Lamar Jackson, and Jayden Daniels citing Vick's influence on their playing styles. The Canadian Football League (CFL) has also seen dual-threat quarterbacks throughout its history. CFL quarterbacks such as Russ Jackson and Damon Allen ran the ball commonly during the 20th-century, and offenses have continued to utilize dual-threats in more recent history.

The term has received scrutiny by some black quarterbacks, with it being viewed as part of the broader racial issues black quarterbacks encounter in the sport. Those critical of the term assert that black quarterbacks are not viewed as "pro-style" quarterbacks and instead stereotyped as dual-threats, and therefore thought of as run-first players or not smart enough when making passing decisions.

== History in college football ==
Dual-threat quarterbacks are a noted feature of college football offenses. High school football players are often dubbed as "dual-threats" in the college recruiting process. The term "pro style" is also used to differentiate from dual-threat prospects. Since 2002, Rivals.com, a website that focuses on college football recruitment, has used the "dual-threat" and "pro-style" designations for their quarterback prospect rankings. ESPN has released their "ESPN 300" recruiting database, an annual ranking of 300 college football prospects, since 2006, and in 2013, the rankings began separating the quarterback position into "dual-threats" and "pocket passers".

Jack Mildren rushed for over 1,000 yards in a wishbone offense for Oklahoma in 1971. Reggie Collier, quarterback at Southern Mississippi from 1979 to 1982, is another example of an early dual-threat quarterback. SB Nation writer Robert Weintraub referred to Collier as the "original dual-threat". Collier was the first Division I-A quarterback to pass and rush for 1,000 yards each in the same season. Weintraub wrote that "as the years passed, [college] offenses spread out, and more schools used dual-threat quarterbacks. Combined 1,000-yard rushing, 1,000-yard passing seasons for college quarterbacks became more common, and soon enough there were also 1K/2K and even 1K/3K seasons." Tony Rice quarterbacked the Notre Dame Fighting Irish in the late 1980s; Notre Dame employed an option offense under head coach Lou Holtz at the time, in which Rice found success as a dual-threat. Southwestern Louisiana's Brian Mitchell played from 1986 to 1989, becoming the first quarterback to both pass and rush for over 3,000 yards during his college career. Mitchell's feat was later matched by Beau Morgan, quarterback for Air Force from 1994 to 1996. Florida State's Charlie Ward was successful both through the air and on the ground, with NFL.com writer Chase Goodbread calling him the "most dynamic dual-threat quarterback of the decade". In 1993, Ward won the Heisman Trophy and led Florida State to its first national championship. A starter during his junior and senior seasons, Ward passed for over 5,000 yards and rushed for just under 1,000 during his college career. In 2001 Clemson quarterback Woodrow Dantzler became the first quarterback in NCAA history to pass for over 2,000 yards and rush for over 1,000 in a single season. That same year, Eric Crouch passed for 1,510 yards and rushed for another 1,115 in his 2001 Heisman Trophy-winning season .

Later in the 2000s, Tim Tebow and Pat White emerged as statistically prolific dual-threats. Heisman.com writer Chris Huston wrote that Tebow's emergence in the 2007 season "marked a clear demarcation point between past and present" for college football. Tebow is widely regarded as one of, if not the best, college football quarterback of all-time. Writing for 247Sports in 2022, Brad Crawford cited Tebow as having opened the door for dual-threat QBs in college. Post-Tebow, the 2010s saw Cam Newton (Auburn), Johnny Manziel (Texas A&M), Lamar Jackson (Louisville), and Kyler Murray (Oklahoma) all enjoying success as dual-threats; each quarterback passed for over 2,000 yards and rushed for over 1,000 during their Heisman Trophy-winning seasons. Robert Griffin III of Baylor and Marcus Mariota of Oregon were also noted by sports media writers for their dual-threat success. During the decade, the run-pass option (RPO), a type of option play, became widely used by college offenses. Deshaun Watson was noted as an effective player for the Clemson Tigers, who often utilized RPOs in their offensive scheme. Sportswriter and former NFL player Bucky Brooks noted Tua Tagovailoa as "an RPO master at Alabama."

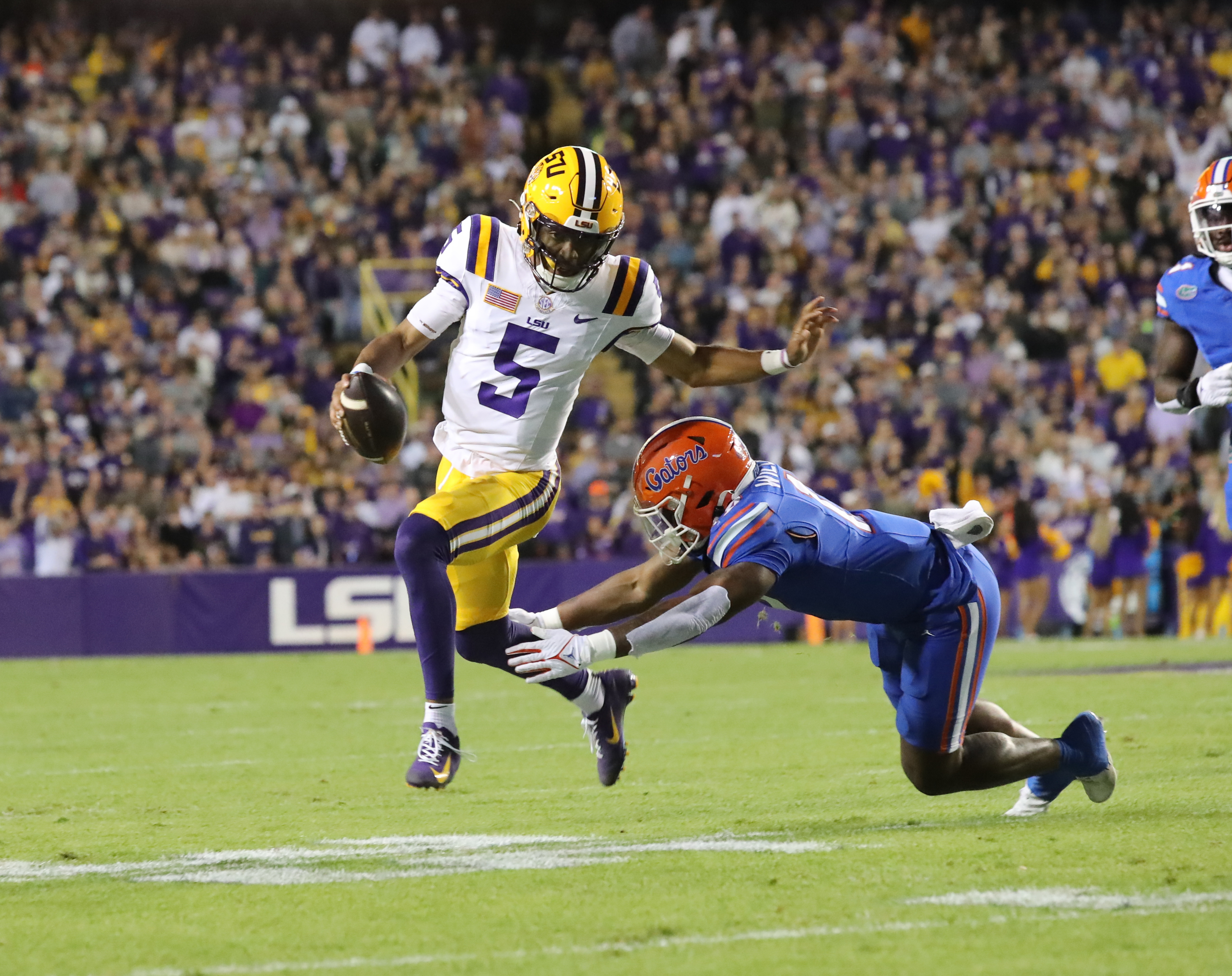
Jayden Daniels of the LSU Tigers is the only college football player to pass for 350 yards and rush for 200 in the same game, doing so against the Florida Gators in 2023.

Jayden Daniels, who played college football at Arizona State (2019–2021) and LSU (2022–2023), is the only player in Football Bowl Subdivision (FBS) history to have 350 passing and 200 rushing yards in a game. Kansas' Jalon Daniels and Alabama's Jalen Milroe were also noted as dual-threats in the 2020s. Georgia head coach Kirby Smart commented that Milroe "is a bigger, more physical version of [Jackson]." In 2023, Texas Longhorns coach Steve Sarkisian expressed difficulty with game-planning for a high-level dual-threat, as during practice "it's not like you can have a guy be a scout team quarterback that's a runner", adding that the scout player would need to "have the ability to throw it to give the defense a realistic [idea] about what they're going to be up against."

== History in the NFL ==
=== Early era (1920s–1940s) ===
The NFL's modern era is generally thought to have begun in 1933, as a result of the NFL breaking away from college rules and the introduction of its own rule book, which included many foundational game elements. One such game feature was allowing for forward passes to be made from anywhere behind the line of scrimmage; as such, the era since 1933 has also been referred to as the "forward pass era".

Prior to the advent of the modern era, many players were two-way players, as league rules prohibited most substitutions. Largely interchangeable, players would play multiple positions on offense and defense even into the early 1940s. Due to this, passers were just as, if not more, likely to run with the football than to pass. Players became more specialized in position over time, as coaches incorporated new game strategies to account for players' "unique physical attributes and skills". Run plays drove much of a team's offensive output, with running responsibilities being absorbed by halfbacks (also referred to as tailbacks or running backs), whereas quarterbacks became distinct passers of the football.

=== Early history of dual-threats (1950s–70s) ===
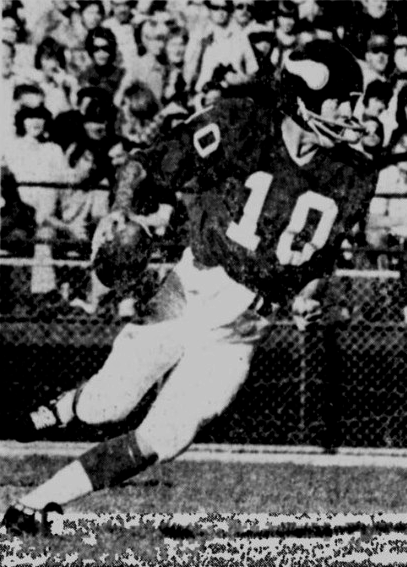
Fran Tarkenton of the Minnesota Vikings scrambling in 1974

In the 1950s, Tobin Rote was a rare example of a dual-threat quarterback; he led the Green Bay Packers in rushing in three seasons, and retired with 3,128 rushing yards.

The next decade saw Fran Tarkenton influence the game in both passing and running aspects. Tarkenton writes, "When I began my NFL career in 1961, I was a freak. The reason was simple: I played quarterback and I ran. There were no designed runs in our playbook, but I would scramble out of the pocket when a play broke down." Tarkenton described scrambling as "not a skill set that was embraced", stating "plenty of people mocked it, and the rest wrote it off." At the time of his retirement, Tarkenton was the all-time leader in rushing yards by a quarterback, with 3,674.

Roger Staubach, quarterback of the Dallas Cowboys from 1969–1979, was another early dual-threat quarterback; in 2012, Bleacher Report placed him sixth on their list of the greatest dual-threats of all time. The website noted Staubach "would run, juke, dive or underhand toss the ball in almost any situation." Greg Landry was also cited as a dual-threat during the 1970s, a decade in which "quarterbacks were predominantly drop-back passers with little mobility". Playing for the Detroit Lions in 1971, Landry became the first quarterback to pass for over 2,000 yards and rush for over 500 yards in the same season, leading Sports Illustrated to assert that Landry's ability to both pass and run with the football gave the Lions "the pro offense of the future." Landry replicated the feat in 1972. The Lions' head coach Joe Schmidt "installed option plays—the heart of the old split-T formation, the granddaddy of the Wishbone—to take advantage of Landry's running ability." This allowed Landry to run on designed plays, in contrast to the scrambling nature displayed by Tarkenton and Staubach.

Also in 1972, Chicago Bears quarterback Bobby Douglass set the single-season rushing yards record for a quarterback, logging 968 yards. Douglass, however, was not considered a good passer. His receivers complained that his arm was "too strong," and he often overthrew the ball. The Bears attempted to create unusual schemes for him before discovering his rushing ability, which led to his record-breaking 1972 season. From 1950 to 1988, Douglass' 1972 season was the only instance in which a quarterback passed 150 times and also had 100 rushing attempts within the same season.

Another rare dual-threat quarterback that emerged in the 1970s was Steve Grogan. Drafted by the New England Patriots in 1975, Grogan scored 12 rushing touchdowns (TDs) in the 1976 season, a record for quarterbacks which stood for 35 years. During the 1978 season, Grogan ran for 539 yards on a team which set the NFL record for total rushing yards (3,165), which stood until the 2019 Baltimore Ravens rushing offense surpassed it. As he sustained injuries over his career, Grogan's mobility would decline and limited by these injuries, he transitioned to a more traditional pocket-passer toward the end of his career.

=== Increased frequency (1980s−1990s) ===
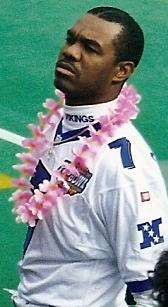
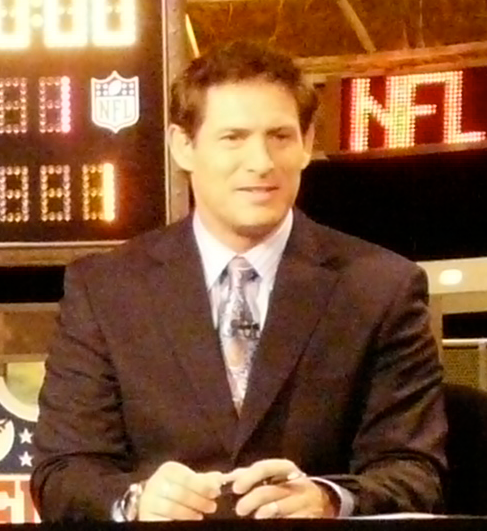
Randall Cunningham (left) and Steve Young (right) were prominent dual-threat quarterbacks during the 1980s and 1990s

During the 1980s and 90s, dual-threat quarterbacks were more frequently seen than in previous decades. Randall Cunningham and Steve Young were prominent rushing quarterbacks during this era. Cunningham was able to exceed Young in statistical regards. On October 18, 1992, Cunningham surpassed Tarkenton's record for career rushing yards by a quarterback. Following the 2001 NFL season, Cunningham retired with a then-record 4,928 rushing yards. Despite Cunningham having more rushing yards, Young held the record for most career rushing touchdowns by a quarterback (43) until being surpassed by Cam Newton in 2016.

There is debate as to whether Young or Cunningham was the better rushing quarterback. In 2011, CraveOnline wrote that although Cunningham and Michael Vick ranked above Young in career rushing yards for a quarterback, the latter would be preferable to emulate "if you are a QB that can run", adding that Young "had the rare gift of explosive speed combined with deadly accuracy." As for Cunningham, NFL media reporter Jeff Darlington wrote "Steve Young had legs that merited the respect of defenders. But Cunningham ... Cunningham was different. And today's quarterbacks know it." Darlington added to his point by referring to an anecdote from Robert Griffin III, a 2010s rushing quarterback, who would watch Cunningham's highlights with his father. Griffin III elaborates, "We'd watch how well he moved in the pocket to avoid defenders and make plays—not just with his legs, but with his arm. He was one of the first true game-changers the league saw."

In addition to Cunningham and Young, John Elway, Steve McNair, and Kordell Stewart were also considered dynamic running quarterbacks of the 1980s and 1990s. Elway appeared in five Super Bowls and holds the record of most rushing TDs by any quarterback in the Super Bowl.

=== The Michael Vick effect (2000s) ===
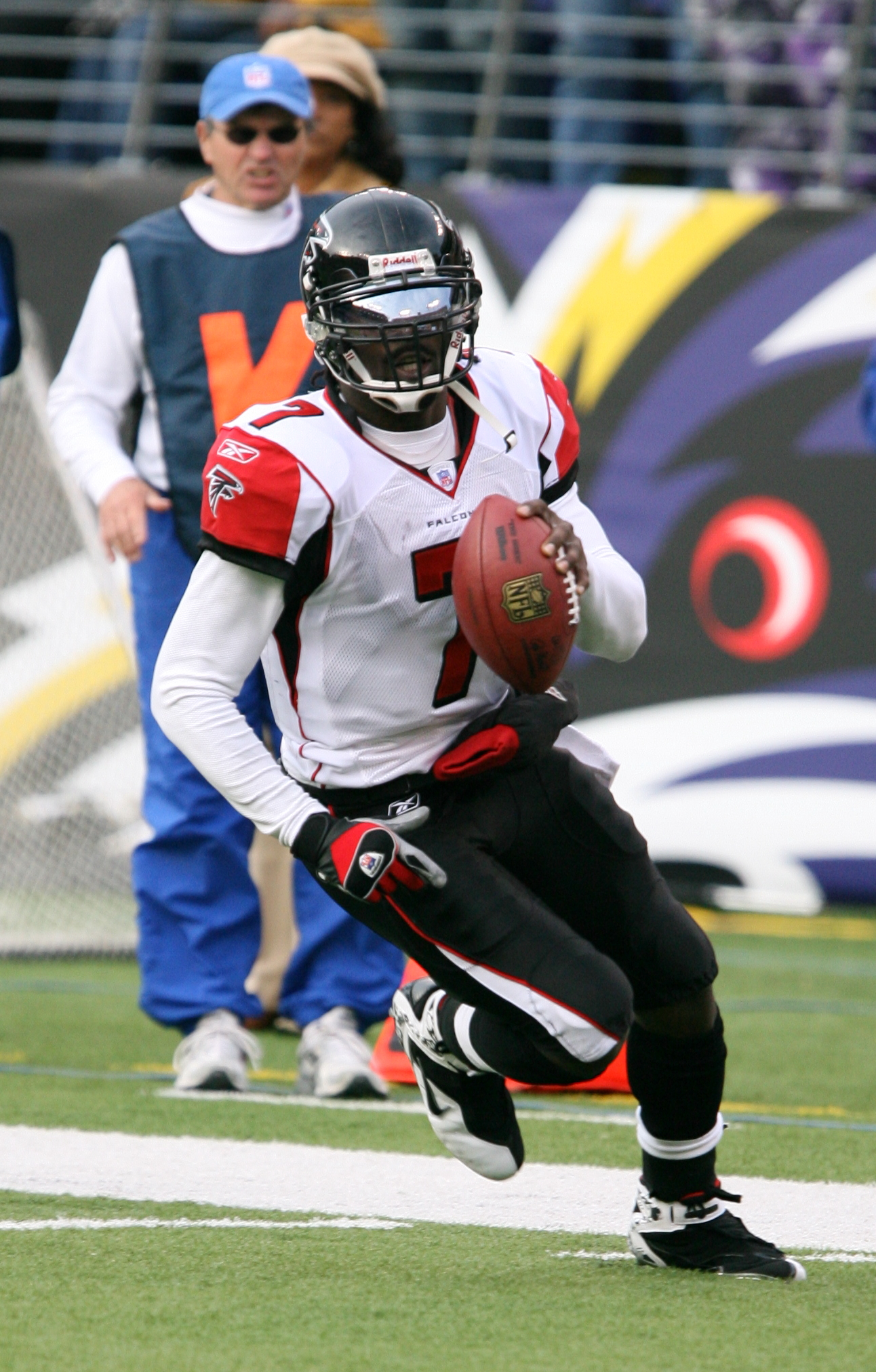
Michael Vick running during his record 2006 season

As Young, Cunningham, and Elway all retired between 1998 and 2001, a new generation of mobile quarterbacks was ushered in. Donovan McNabb was drafted by the Eagles in 1999, beginning a successful quarterbacking career, in which his running ability was frequently noted. In 2000, McNabb joined Douglass (1972) and Cunningham (1987–1990) as players to lead their teams in both passing and rushing yards. On his mobility, McNabb once joked, "I think you run a lot better when you don't want to be hit." After sustaining an injury in the 2003 season, there was speculation as to whether McNabb would be able to retain his mobility, with Ray Buchanan stating, "We'd probably rather see McNabb, because he's not as mobile right now"; McNabb responded, stating he would "just let people continue" to doubt his mobility and strive to showcase it "when the time comes".

McNabb was also connected to Michael Vick, one of the most prolific running quarterbacks in the history of the NFL. While attending Syracuse University, McNabb attempted to assist in Vick's recruitment and mentored Vick about the speed of the professional level. Vick served as McNabb's backup in Philadelphia in 2009, later succeeding McNabb as the starter for the franchise. Vick was drafted first overall by the Atlanta Falcons in 2001. Vick would go on to be a successful runner for the Falcons from 2001 to 2006. 14 games into his 2006 season, Vick broke Douglass' single-season rushing yards record by a quarterback. A week later, Vick surpassed the 1,000 rushing yards milestone, becoming the first quarterback to reach the mark in a single season. He finished the season with a record 1,039 yards. Vick's mobility influenced future mobile quarterbacks; Jenny Vrentas of Sports Illustrated writes, "Young players go out of their way to tell Vick that they were always him when they played Madden growing up, and wore his Nike cleats."

After his return to the NFL, and a season as McNabb's backup, Vick earned his second starting opportunity. His 2010 rushing statistics (league-leading 676 yards among quarterbacks and 9 touchdowns) were the foundation for the acceptance of mobile quarterbacks in the early 2010s. On his overall impact and legacy in regards to dual-threat quarterbacks, Vick stated, "I was the guy who started it all," adding, "I revolutionized the game. I changed the way it was played in the NFL." However, Vick has also stated that he looked up to Cunningham while he was growing up.

=== Newfound implementation of dual-threats (early 2010s) ===
Entering the 2010s, running the football as a quarterback still held a mixed perception from NFL analysts and scouts, particularly in regards to a quarterback's potential success in transitioning from the collegiate to the professional quarterback. Tim Tebow's prospects as an NFL quarterback, for example, was the target of much skepticism and criticism ahead of his rookie season in 2010. ESPN writer Sheldon Spencer questioned "Can Tebow succeed in his transition from Florida's run-option, shotgun offense to taking snaps under center in Denver's pro-style attack?" In general, for much of the NFL's half-century history prior, "the running quarterback was limited to one player per generation, an exception to the rule of pocket passers. They were almost regarded as gimmicks".

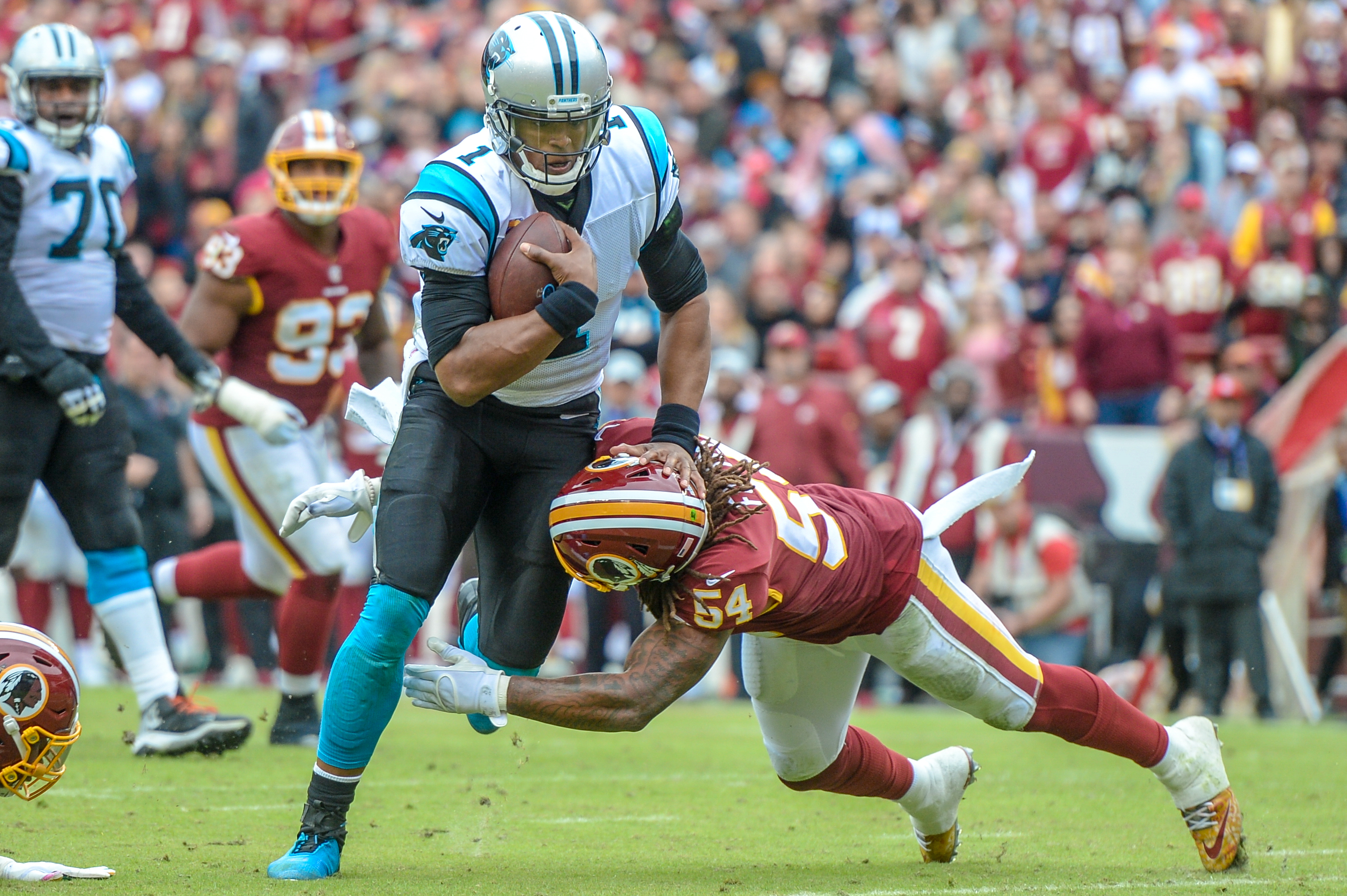
Cam Newton (pictured running with the ball) established himself as a dominant dual-threat quarterback in the 2010s

The following 2011 season saw Cam Newton drafted first overall by the Carolina Panthers. Newton went on to lead quarterbacks in rushing yards, with 706, and broke Steve Grogan's 1976 single-season record for rushing touchdowns by a quarterback (12), with 14. Also during the 2011 season, Vick surpassed Cunningham's career rushing yardage record for quarterbacks.

In addition to Newton and Tebow, notable dual-threat quarterbacks in the early 2010s included Robert Griffin III, Colin Kaepernick, Andrew Luck, Aaron Rodgers, Russell Wilson. Rodgers, often cited as one of the most talented players to play quarterback, is noted for often using his mobility to avoid pressure and extend plays.

In spite of success found by dual-threats in the early 2010s, some analysts were still skeptical of dual-threat quarterbacks' value, suggesting that quarterbacks who run may be more likely to overlook more-productive passing plays. During the 2014 season, Kaepernick, Griffin III, and Newton were all cited as declining or regressing players. Kaepernick was labeled "symbolic of running QB struggles," by NFL.com writer Chris Wesseling. This came after Kaepernick and the 49ers were defeated by Derek Carr and the Oakland Raiders. Carr is not considered a dual-threat quarterback, though his "mindset, athleticism, pocket presence, quick release and strong arm" have all been praised by executives, coaches and analysts. Steve Young, who ranks third all-time in rushing yards for a quarterback, was cited as believing scrambling away from pressure limits and stunts the development of a quarterback's pocket presence. During the season, Bill Polian, a former Indianapolis Colts president, stated, "What we're seeing this year is the incredible erosion of the running quarterback." Obstacles such as high expectations and an increased risk of injury hindered the perception that mobile quarterbacks would dominate the position.

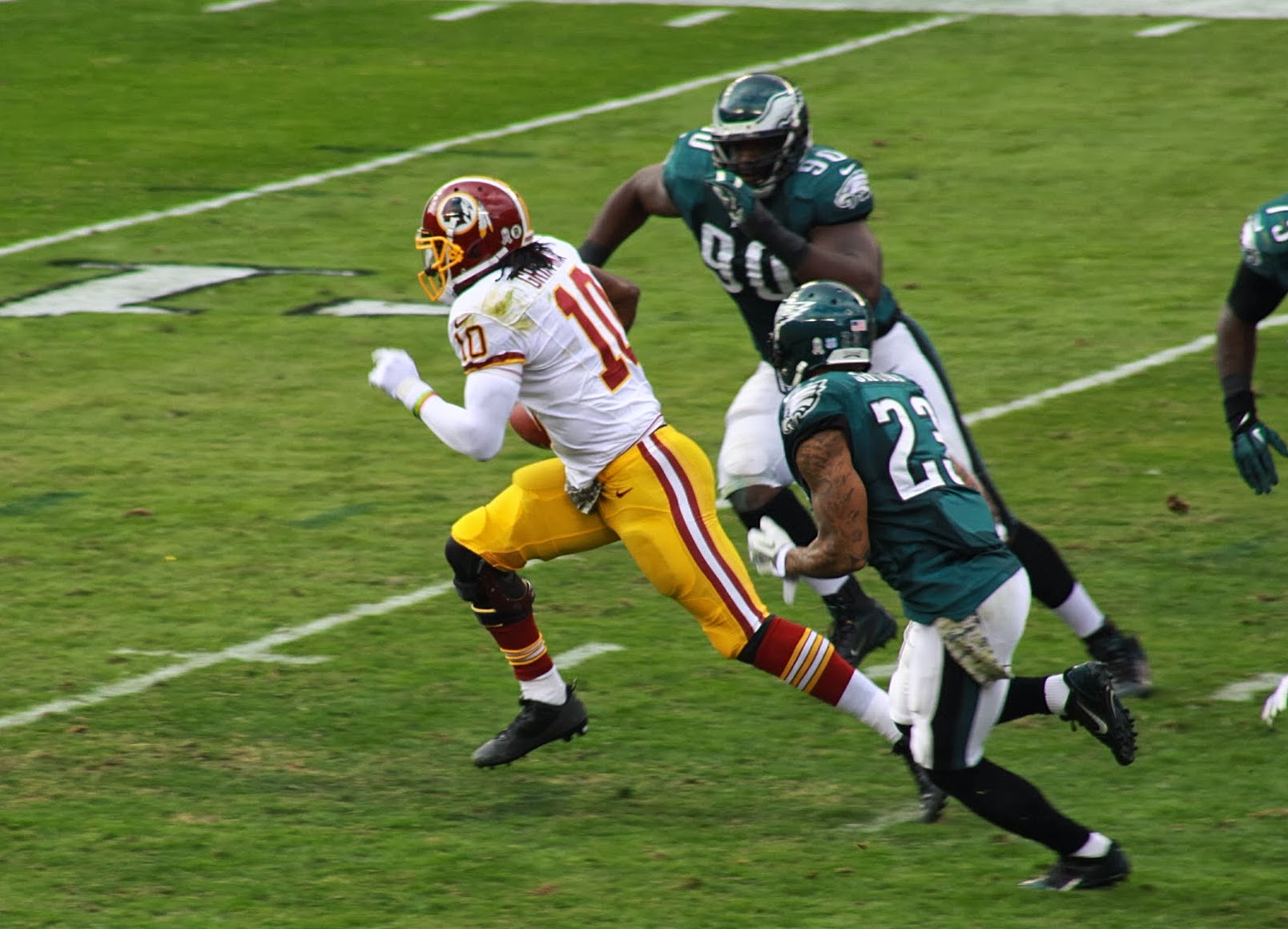
Robert Griffin III (left, running) was often touted as a dynamic dual-threat talent in the early 2010s

While Kaepernick, Newton, and Griffin III struggled during the season, the mobility of other quarterbacks was praised. Success in the passing game, while using mobility to extend plays, was regarded more highly than pure running athleticism in 2014. Aaron Rodgers' mobility, for example, was considered by one NFL.com writer to be critical to the Packers' offense. New England Patriots head coach Bill Belichick praised Rodgers' mobility, stating, "he has a great ability to extend plays, either sliding in the pocket or at times scrambling outside the pocket." Luck's mobility was also acclaimed by NFL head coach Chip Kelly. Despite early-season reports of a decline in the performance of dual-threat quarterbacks, Russell Wilson rushed for a career-high 849 yards, 6 touchdowns and a league high 7.2 yards per attempt in 2014, leading the Seattle Seahawks to a second consecutive Super Bowl appearance.

Writing for ESPN in 2024, Bill Barnwell retrospectively opined that the early 2010s "could be argued" as the period in which the "tide shifted" towards a higher acceptance and utilization of dual-threats. Supporting this, he cited Newton and Tebow's status as "150/100 guys" (quarterbacks who passed 150 times and ran 100 times in the same season) in 2011, as well as Griffin's and Kaepernick's "playoff runs [in 2012 and 2014, respectively] in offenses incorporating zone-read concepts from the college level".

=== Introduction of the run-pass option (late 2010s–2020s) ===
Referred to as "the most complex position in sports" by Bleacher Report, the dual-threat quarterback position had its long-term viability in the NFL debated by sports publications midway through the 2010s. "Waning results and injuries" to quarterbacks such as Robert Griffin III and Johnny Manziel were cited as reasons why "the league [seemed] less keen on dual-threat quarterbacks." Griffin and Kaepernick had their futures as starting NFL quarterbacks called into question by sports writers in 2015. Local Bay Area media described Kaepernick's run as the 49ers' starter as "flashy" and cited a league source predicting his release following the 2015 season. College quarterbacks with dual-threat abilities were being cited as potentially not having their skill sets translate into the NFL.

However, new dual-threat quarterbacks emerged as starters during 2015, such as Marcus Mariota and Tyrod Taylor. Cam Newton also had a resurgent season, scoring 10 rushing touchdowns en route to an MVP selection and a Super Bowl berth. However, as Newton was also successful in his passing game, one Wall Street Journal reporter wrote that "defenses say it is Newton's ability to do anything on any given play that really keeps them up at night", adding "[Newton] is a pass-first quarterback capable of picking up a first down with his legs at any moment."

Dual-threat quarterbacks continued to rise in significance in the NFL during the late 2010s; Deshaun Watson and Lamar Jackson, among others, emerged as dynamic starting options during their rookie seasons (2017 and 2018, respectively). In 2019, Jackson surpassed Vick's single-season rushing yards record among quarterbacks, while also recording a league-leading 36 passing touchdowns en route to an MVP award.

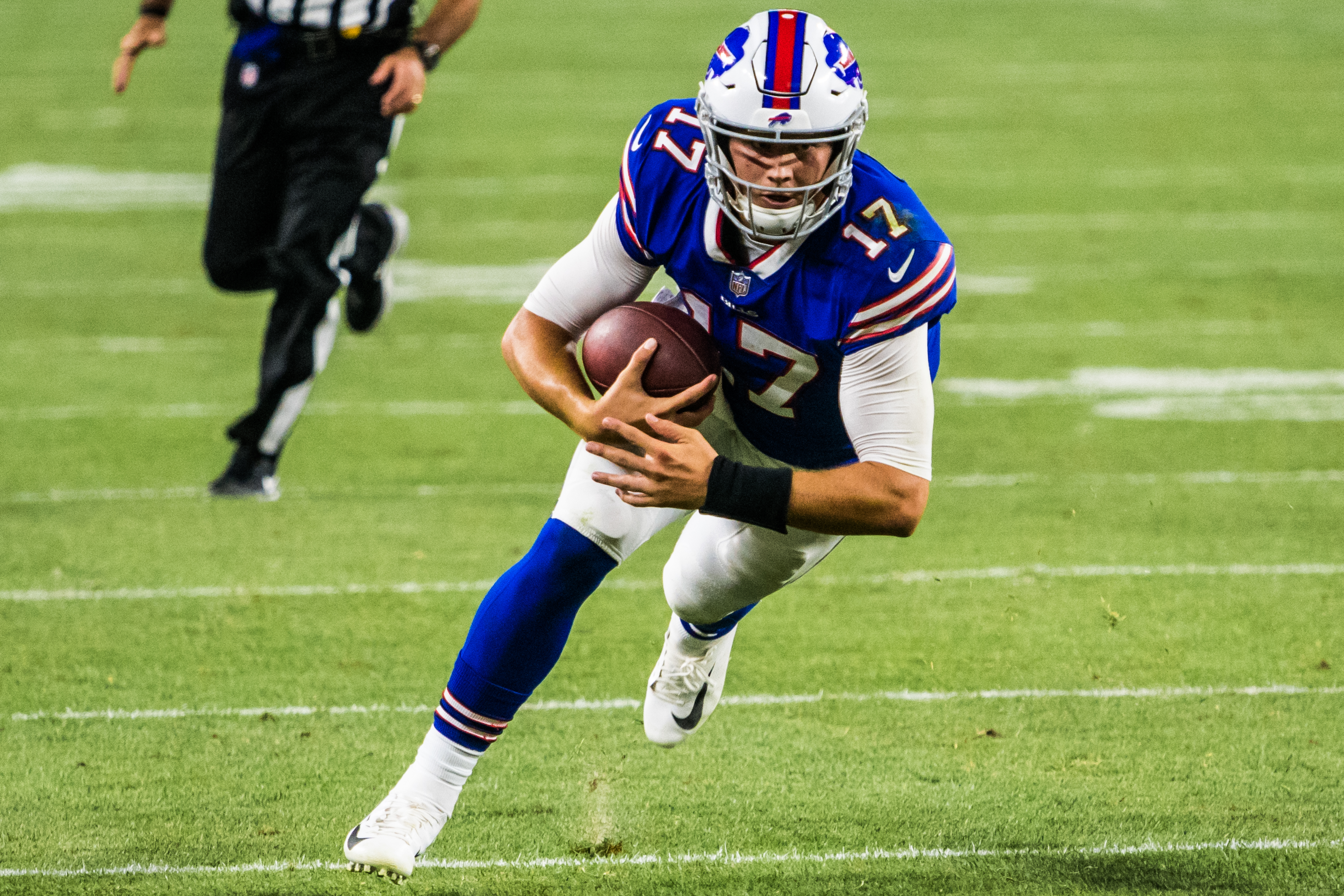
Josh Allen emerged as an effective dual-threat quarterback when he began playing in the late 2010s.

In addition to Jackson and Watson, Josh Allen, Daniel Jones, Patrick Mahomes, Kyler Murray, and Dak Prescott emerged as mobile threats from the late 2010s NFL draft classes. (Note: Sources describing these quarterbacks as dual-threats include:) By 2022, the budding rivalry between Allen and Mahomes, who had met in the playoffs in consecutive years, began to see comparisons to the Tom Brady–Peyton Manning rivalry, though Gary Gramling of Sports Illustrated noted that detractors would claim that the mobile style of play used by Allen and Mahomes was "less sustainable" than that of Brady and Manning, two classic pocket quarterbacks.

Around the time of these quarterbacks entering the league, NFL offenses began to increasingly adopt run-pass option (RPO) plays during games. The Philadelphia Eagles are often credited with popularizing RPOs in the NFL, due to their success running them late in 2017, en route to a Super Bowl LII victory. In the 2020s, Jalen Hurts, Justin Fields, Jayden Daniels, and Jaxson Dart emerged as dual-threat talents. The presence of two dual-threat quarterbacks as starters in Super Bowl LVII (Mahomes and Hurts) was cited as the style being able to succeed at a high level in the NFL. As the league's best quarterbacks achieved success while being dual-threats, the style of play began to be considered as standard for the position; in 2022, Bucky Brooks opined that "It has taken some time for the traditionalist to accept it, but the prototypical quarterback is a dual-threat playmaker with the ability to produce big plays as throwers and runners." Brooks added that quarterback prospects would struggle to find a roster spot if they are "unable to pick up yardage on a designed QB run or an impromptu scramble".

== History in the CFL ==
Dual-threat quarterbacks are also noted in the Canadian Football League (CFL). Russ Jackson passed for over 24,000 yards and rushed for over 5,000 during his time in the CFL (1958–1969), leading the Ottawa Rough Riders to a playoff berth in each of his 12 seasons and a Grey Cup championship three times. Damon Allen, whose career lasted from 1985 to 2007, was another notable dual-threat in CFL history. Allen rushed for 93 touchdowns and logged 11,920 rushing yards, third all-time across all positions at the time of his retirement. He also retired with a CFL record 72,381 passing yards, cementing his dual-threat status. Vernon Adams, Cody Fajardo, and Jeremiah Masoli were noted by football media writers as CFL dual-threats in the 2010s.

== Criticism of term's racial connotation ==
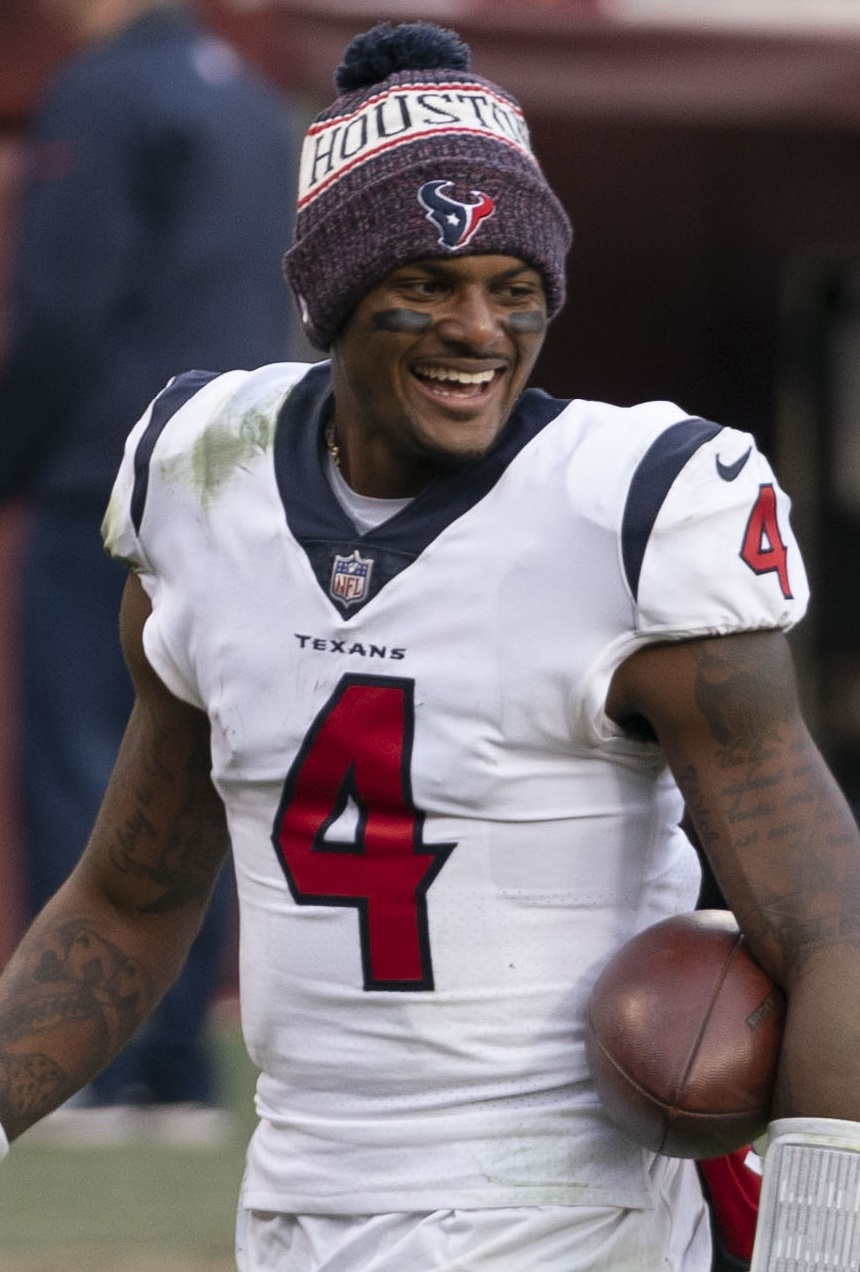
Deshaun Watson (pictured in 2018) has been critical of the "dual-threat" term

Black quarterbacks often get tagged as dual-threats, rather than "pro-style" quarterbacks, while still high school prospects. In 2012, Bleacher Report wrote, "By the time kids establish themselves as prospects to watch, they're already christened 'pro style' or 'dual threat.' Either they're the kind of quarterback that can succeed in the NFL, or they're black." The term's usage as a stereotyping of black quarterbacks in draft scouting reports has also been documented. Black quarterbacks have not always had their dual-threat success in college translate to being highly-drafted by an NFL team. Collier, for example, was a sixth-round pick in the 1983 NFL draft, despite his success passing and running the ball. Black dual-threat QBs entering the NFL have also been noted to be asked or required to change positions by their NFL teams; Freddie Solomon, Hines Ward, Antwaan Randle El, Josh Cribbs, and Brad Smith all played quarterback during college but were wide receivers or kick returners as professionals. Lamar Jackson was also asked to switch positions prior to the 2018 NFL draft.

Some quarterbacks have expressed discontent with being tagged as a "dual-threat quarterback". The term has been noted to be used disproportionately more often for black quarterbacks, "with racial undertones to how they are perceived in the NFL." Michael Vick opined that "A lot of us [black quarterbacks] aren't viewed as passers -- we're viewed as athletes. I think it's unfair and unfortunate." In 2018, The Undefeated writer Jeff Rivers commented:

"Even in recent years, the term 'dual-threat' (running and passing) has been used as a barrier in the final goal-line stand between black athletes and equal access to the NFL quarterback position, its glory and all its risks and rewards. To some, running was evidence that quarterbacks, especially black quarterbacks, weren't smart enough to decide when to pass."

In an interview with Bleacher Report, while still a college quarterback at Clemson, Deshaun Watson called the term a "code word" and expressed that he was stereotyped as a run-first quarterback due to his race. In 2018, while playing for the Houston Texans, Watson was the target of a racially-charged criticism from a Texas school district superintendent. The superintendent criticized a late-game mistake by Watson, commenting, "When you need precision decision making you can't count on a black quarterback."

== See also ==
- History of American football positions
- List of dual-threat quarterback records
- Quarterback keeper
- Triple-threat quarterback
