= Quarterback sneak =

Gridiron football play

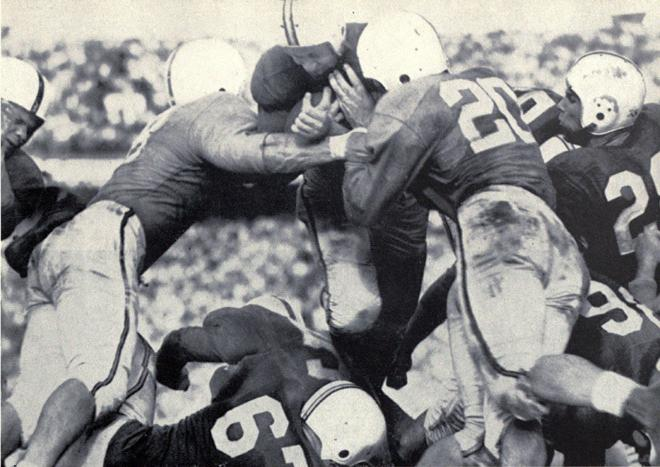
Maryland quarterback Jack Scarbath tallies the first score in the 1952 Sugar Bowl on a successful quarterback sneak.

A quarterback sneak is a play in gridiron football in which the quarterback, upon taking the center snap, runs forward or dives ahead while the offensive line is also surging forward. Despite the "sneak" moniker, this version of a quarterback draw play is often expected in situations where a very short gain is needed.

The play is often desired in short-yardage situations in the National Football League (NFL), since there are no further ball exchanges beyond the center snap. The quarterback receives the ball near the line of scrimmage and immediately moves forward, giving the defense little time to react and making it less likely that significant yardage will be lost on the play. Although the play rarely gains more than one or two yards, it can result in a significant gain. One notable exception was Greg Landry gaining 76 yards in 1970 on a quarterback sneak against Green Bay, which set an NFL record at the time for the longest rush by a quarterback.

Quarterback sneaks are statistically the most likely plays to convert short yardage situations, though each situation varies. Many football statistics sites advocate for increased usage of the play.

QB sneaks have drawbacks in that they tend to expose the quarterback to hits from opposing defenders. Often quarterbacks do not wish to expose themselves to the increased risk of injury associated with the play. This is especially prevalent with traditional pocket passing quarterbacks, such as Drew Brees or Tom Brady, although Brady was very effective at running the play. One of the most famous sneaks in football history was executed by Green Bay Packers quarterback Bart Starr against the Dallas Cowboys in the famous "Ice Bowl" NFL championship game played on December 31, 1967.

== Tush Push ==
Since 2021, the Philadelphia Eagles have run a variant of the quarterback sneak in which additional players line up behind the quarterback and physically push him forward as the offensive line surges ahead. The play became widely known as the "Tush Push" or "Brotherly Shove". It gained prominence due to the Eagles' significant success with it, becoming a key part of their offensive strategy. However, the play has also drawn controversy, with critics arguing that it provides an unfair advantage and poses potential safety risks.

== Canadian football ==
Quarterback sneaks are more common (and successful) in Canadian football due to the neutral zone being one yard, as opposed to American football where the neutral zone is only the length of the football. Due to the prevalence of sneaks in the Canadian Football League, backup quarterbacks are used as short-yardage specialists so that the starting quarterback does not get injured.

== See also ==
- Quarterback keeper
- Quarterback scramble
