= Passing pocket =

American football term

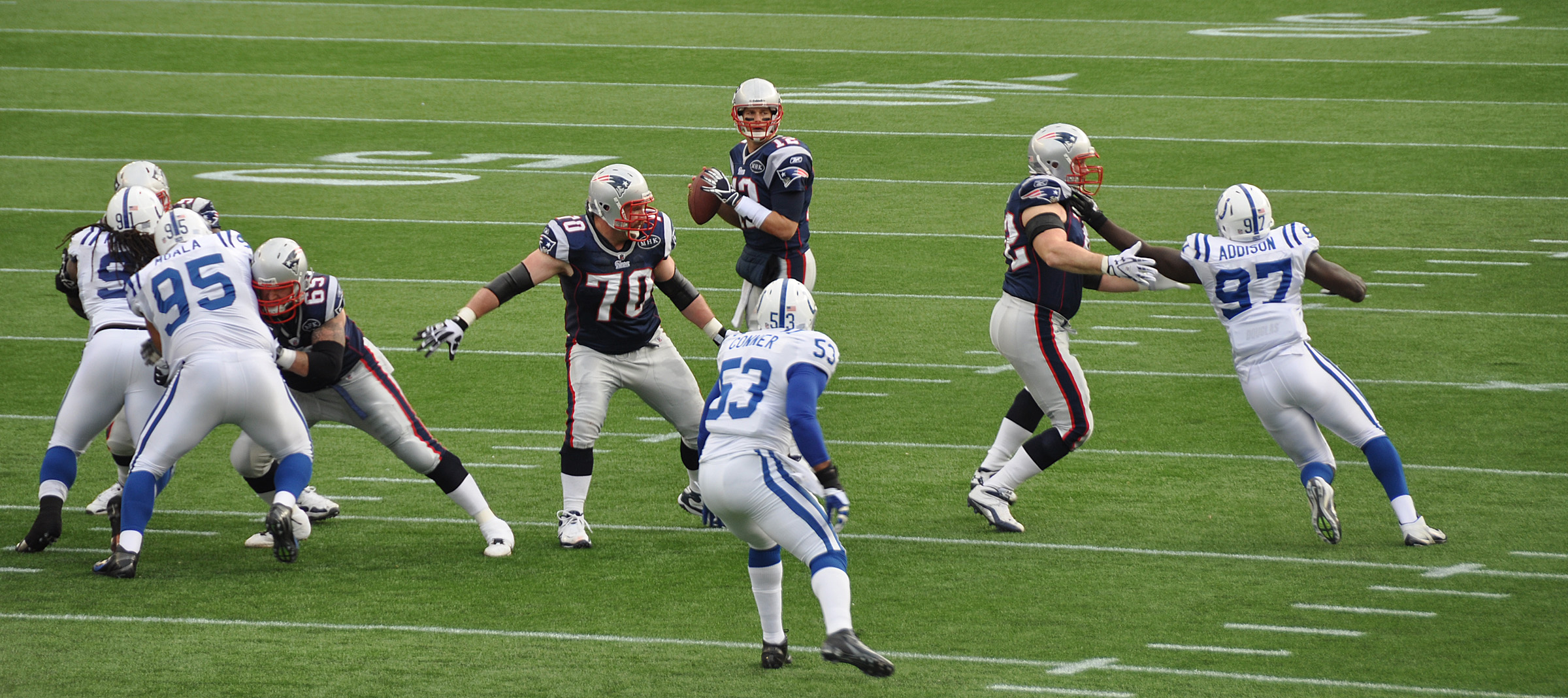
Tom Brady in the pocket

The passing pocket, usually referred to as the pocket, is a term used in gridiron football to describe the area in the backfield created on a passing play where the offensive line forms a wall of protection around the quarterback. This allows him adequate time to find an open receiver and to pass the ball. The offensive line will drop back slightly, creating a U-shaped protected area for the quarterback to find an open receiver and pass the ball.

If the quarterback is unable to find an open receiver, he will attempt to run the ball himself, throw the ball out of bounds to prevent a sack and/or turnover, or if there is no lane, may collapse to the ground to protect the ball and try to avoid a fumble. Even with a well structured offensive line, the quarterback only has seconds to pass the ball within the pocket. Moving the pocket can help avoid a sack. When that fails, quarterbacks may scramble (run around behind the line of scrimmage), either to gain more time for the wide receivers, to avoid a sack, or to rush the ball. Quarterbacks are judged significantly on their ability to make decisions based on the status of the pocket before it is collapsed by the defensive line, a skill called pocket awareness.

Quarterbacks who primarily operate within the pocket are known as pocket passers and are generally known for their focus on arm power, accuracy, pocket presence and their lack of mobility outside of the pocket. Pocket passers have been a fixture of quarterback play during much of the game's history and are often contrasted with dual-threat quarterbacks, who are adept at both running and passing the ball. Notable quarterbacks who were generally known as pocket passers include Tom Brady, Peyton Manning, Dan Marino, Kurt Warner, and Drew Bledsoe.

== Tackle box structure ==
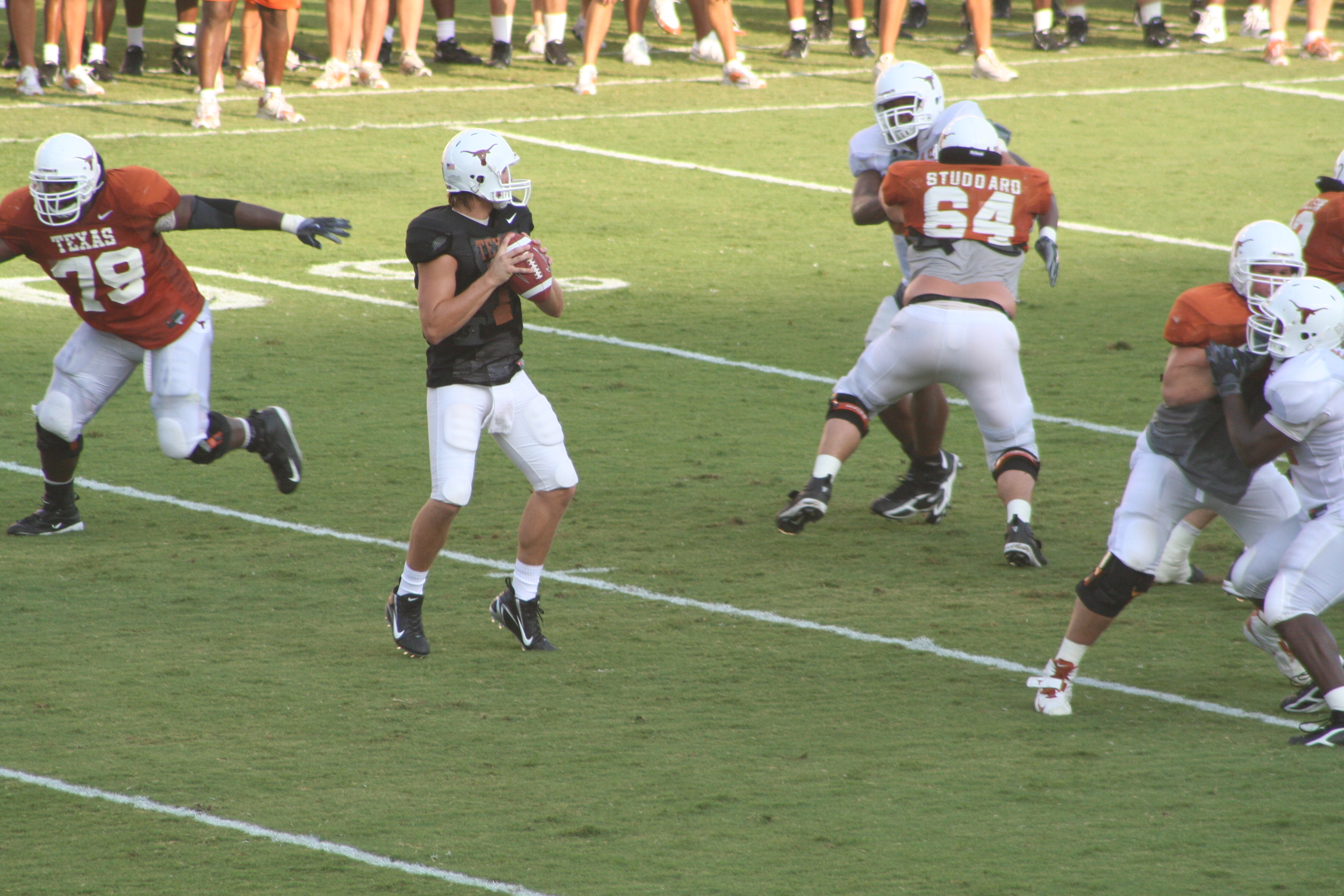
A quarterback at practice, dropping back to pass.

The area between the two tackles on the offensive line is referred to as the tackle box. This area itself can be formed using different types of protections to keep the quarterback safe. The offensive tackles set the depth of the tackle box by kick sliding back to around six yards after the snap of the ball. The guards are next in depth and will drop back to around three to four yards and will defend the middle of the pocket along with the center. The different drop-back depths of the linemen helps to create enough space for the quarterback to go through his throwing motion. Sometimes tight ends and running backs may be used as extra blockers to solidify the pocket.

== Pocket protection packages ==
There are many different player personnel packages that can be used to protect the quarterback. For example, the pocket could be protected by five linemen, two tight ends, and two running backs. When two running backs are used, they do constitute the tackle box but they are typically used to clear any stray rushers that may get past the inner linemen. They are used to create more space for the quarterback to step into in order to make a good throw. There can be one or two running backs used along with one or two tight ends depending on the packages that are called for. Sometimes, running backs and tight ends will partially block an advancing defender quickly, or what's known as "chip blocking" an advancing defender, and then they will run their receiving route.

Tight ends can do the same thing, which means that the tackles would then have to set the depth of the tackle box.

== Defensive maneuvers ==
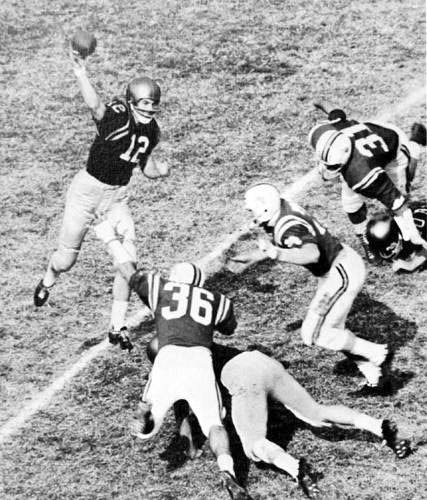
Quarterback Roger Staubach of Navy tosses a pass against Maryland just as the pocket collapses.

The object of the defense is to break down the tackle box as quickly as possible. They will try to send extra rushers to outnumber the blockers. Another tactic would be to send speed rushers off either side of the offensive line to run around the tackles before they can set the depth of the tackle box. The defensive ends are sometimes able to run past the tackles and get to the quarterback before he can step up into the tackle box to protect himself better. Another maneuver that is used is the middle blitz, where the defense sends multiple rushers up the middle of the line in order to get past the center and guards to collapse the tackle box and sack the quarterback. The offensive line cannot block up the middle when too many rushers are running at them. This rushes the quarterback and forces him to get rid of the ball before he is ready to do so. There are many different types of blitzes but their only purpose is to confuse the blockers and ruin the tackle box that is being formed.

== When the tackle box collapses ==
When the defense succeeds in their goal of confusing the offensive linemen, major problems form for the quarterback. The term that is used when the defense is getting close to the quarterback is that the tackle box is collapsing. When the tackle box collapses, the quarterback is trained to do one of a few different things: to scramble out of the tackle box and look to gain yards by running, to get outside of the tackle box and either extend the play or throw the ball out of bounds, or—in extreme situations—to just take the sack and not lose possession of the football. While the pocket will always collapse eventually, situations where the pocket collapses faster than anticipated create a difficult conundrum for quarterbacks, as they are faced with a plethora of possible choices with virtually no time to choose between them. A quarterback who is able to effectively react to the pocket collapsing and salvage the play is said to have good pocket awareness or pocket presence.
