= Quarterback scramble =

Impromptu run by a quarterback in gridiron football

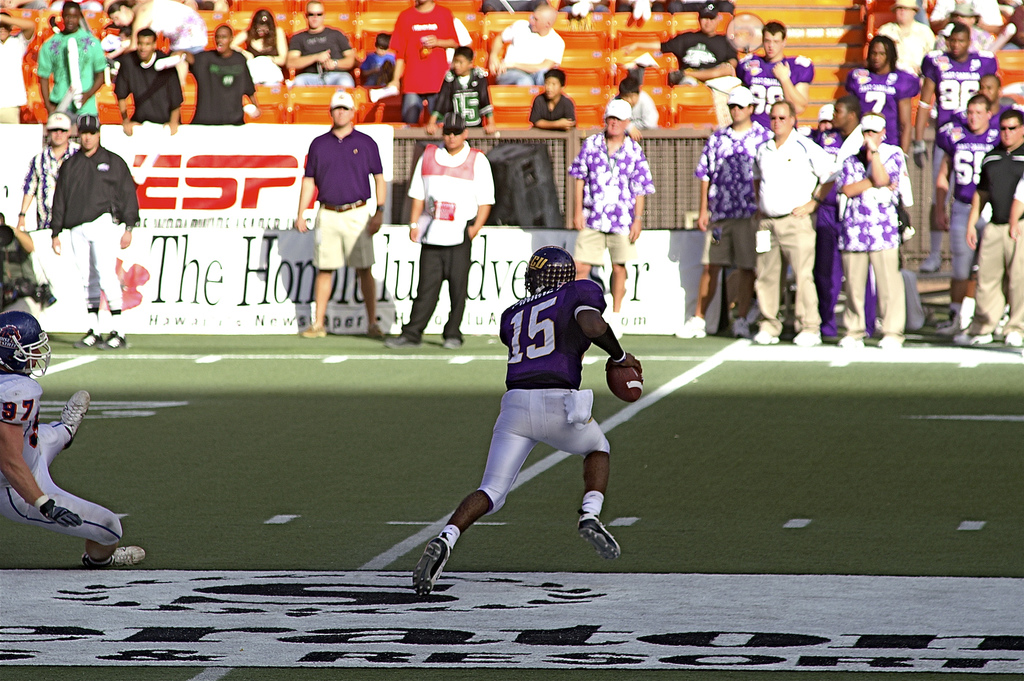
A quarterback scramble in the 2007 Hawaii Bowl.

In gridiron football, a quarterback scramble or scramble is an impromptu maneuver or run by a quarterback. If a quarterback is under pressure by an opposing team's defense, he may run forward, backward, or laterally in an attempt to avoid being tackled behind the line of scrimmage for a sack. A scramble is not usually a designed play (designed quarterback run plays include the keeper and bootleg play), but instead is the action of a quarterback to avoid being sacked by the defense or an improvised run forward to gain yardage if an opportunity presents itself.

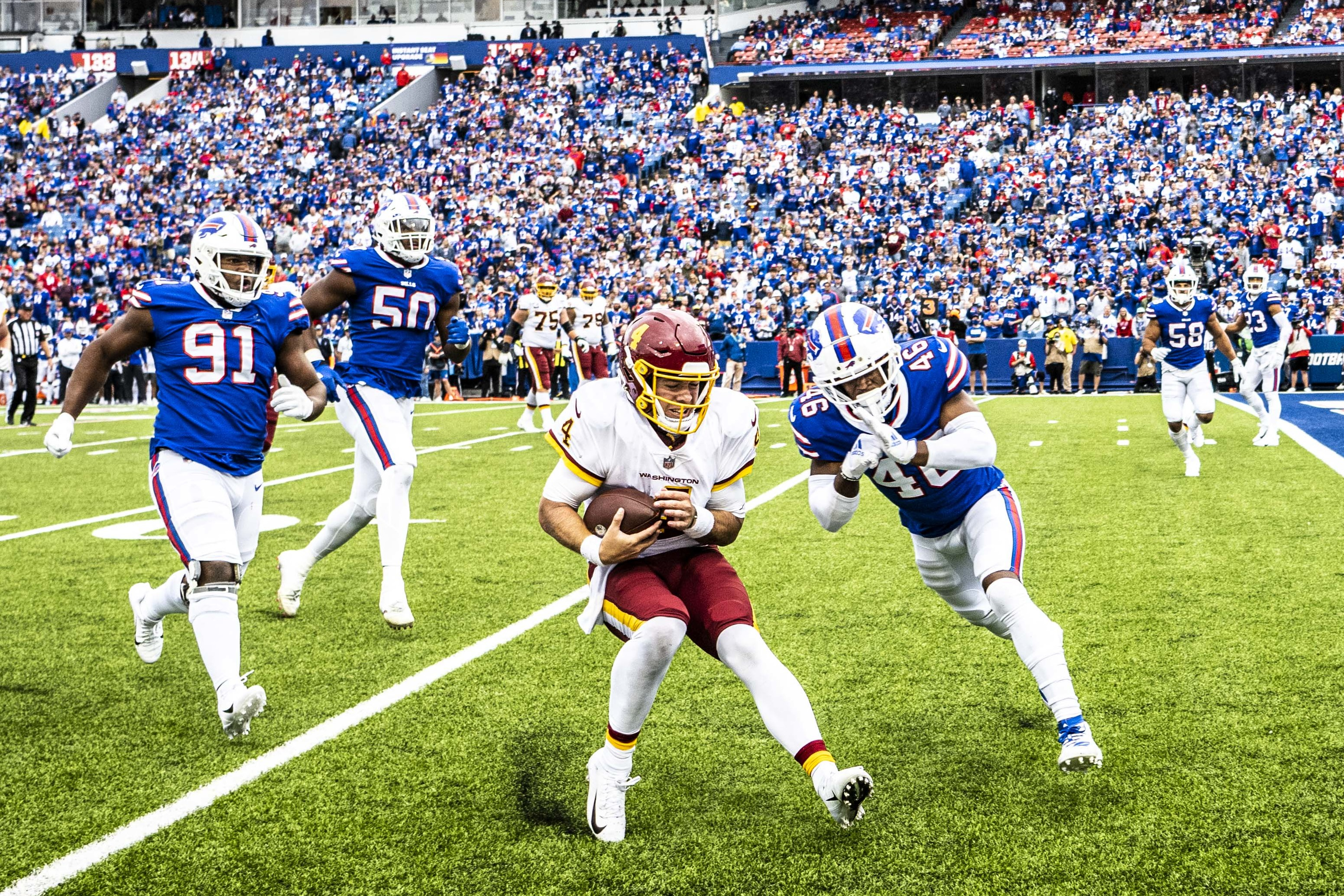
Washington Football Team quarterback Taylor Heinicke (#4) attempting a slide after a scramble.

Due to the risk of injury or fumbling the ball while scrambling, quarterbacks are advised to slide down to avoid unnecessary hits after picking up the necessary yardage. NFL coach Zac Taylor is quoted as saying "There is a time to put your head down and go get that first down. Then there are some times we just have to assess the situation and be smart and keep us on pace for the next drive."

Scrambling is mostly forbidden in six-man football, which requires that the quarterback relinquish the ball before it crosses the line of scrimmage.

== See also ==
- Dual-threat quarterback
- Quarterback keeper
