= Quarterback keeper =

American football play

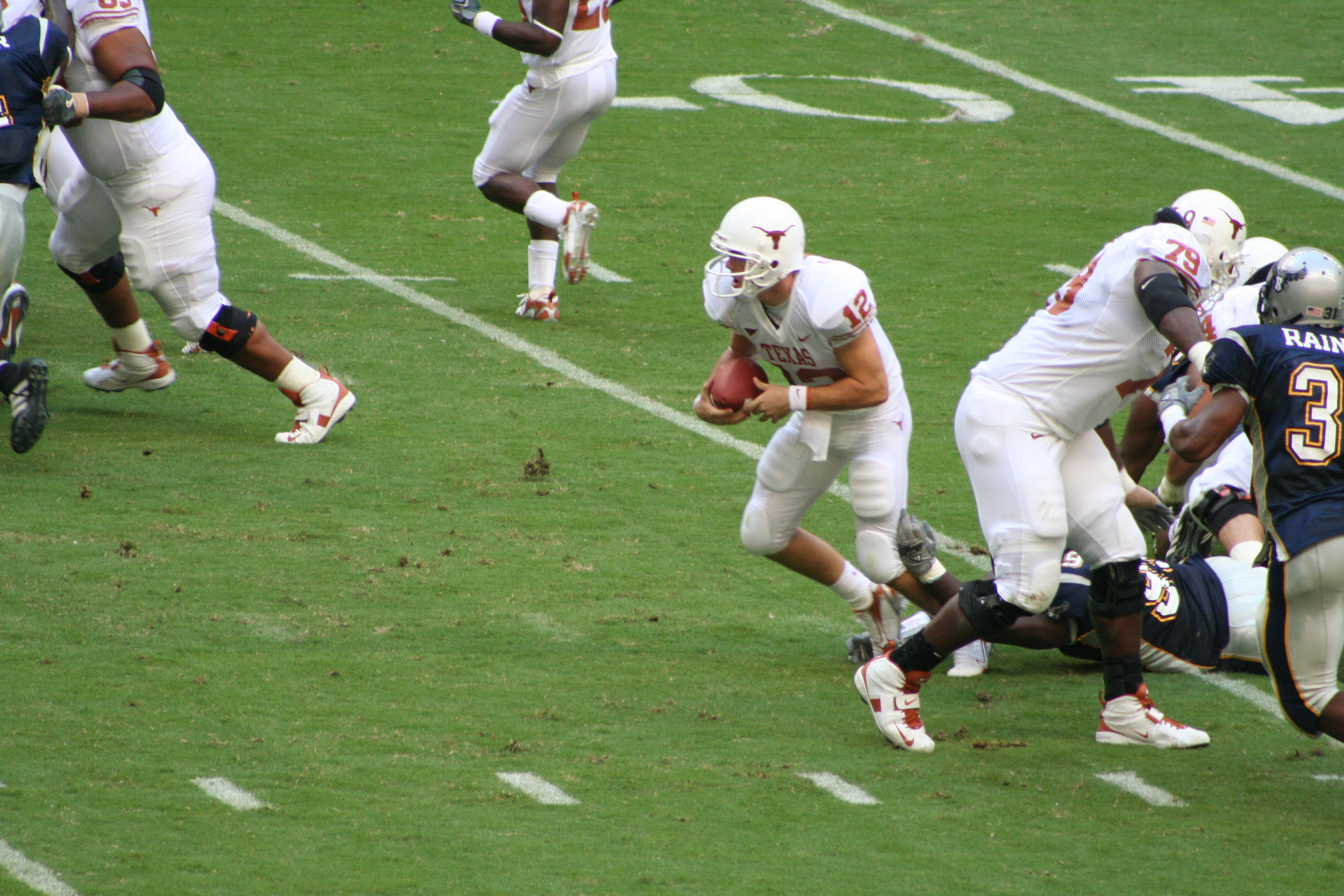
Colt McCoy runs a keeper

A quarterback keeper or keeper in American football is a designed play in which the quarterback does not pass or hand off the ball to another player and instead rushes forward with it in an effort to gain yardage. The play typically is run in instances where only a few yards are needed to gain a first down or touchdown, due to the threat of injury to the quarterback and most quarterbacks' ineffectiveness at running the ball when compared with a running back or fullback; however, this play is called more often with dual-threat quarterbacks. Variations include the bootleg and quarterback sneak.
