= Option offense =

American football offense style

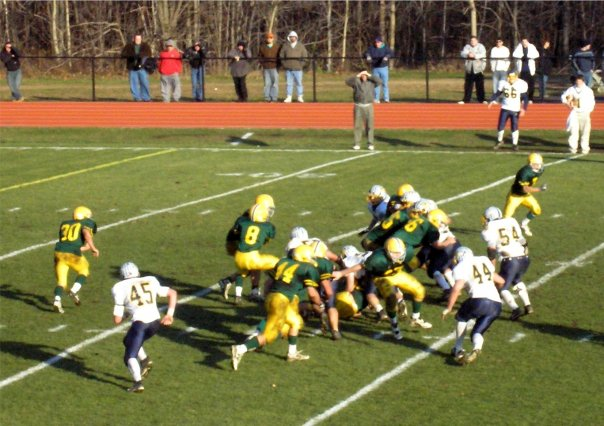
The option offense can be run out of various formations. Here, Morris Knolls High School of Denville, New Jersey is running the veer option.

An option offense is an American football offensive system in which a key player (usually the quarterback) has several "options" of how each play will proceed based upon the actions of the defense. Traditionally, option-based offenses rely on running plays, though most mix in forward passes from an option formation as a change of pace. A successful option-based offense can keep possession of the ball for long periods of time, giving the opposing offense fewer possessions and keeping the option team's defense rested. However, because passing is often not a strength of the system, it can be difficult for option-based offenses to come back from a large deficit or to score quickly when needed.

There are several types of option plays, with the common element being that the quarterback must decide which available option has the best chance of succeeding. This decision is usually made soon after the ball is snapped based upon the initial movements of one or two specific defensive players, called "keys" or "reads".

The most common option plays are as follows:

- In a triple option play, the quarterback can either hand the ball to a fullback running towards the center of the line (dive), fake a handoff and attempt to run the ball himself (quarterback keeper), or pitch the ball to a trailing running back angling towards the sideline (pitch). The quarterback decides which option to utilize by reading the reaction of specific defensive linemen and linebackers which can vary depending on the defensive formation. This triple option is most often run from a wishbone or flexbone formation.
- In a read option play, the quarterback has only one teammate to whom he can pitch or hand the ball, and he typically "reads" the initial movement of the defensive end when deciding whether to run a keeper or hand it off. This play can be run from a wider variety of offensive formations than the triple option, allowing it to be used as a change-of-pace by teams that do not utilize an option-heavy offensive system.
- A more recent innovation is the run-pass option play (RPO), in which the quarterback usually has the option of either handing the ball to a running back or throwing a quick pass. The defensive key for RPOs is usually a specific linebacker or safety, but as with all option plays, the read may vary depending on the play design and the pre-snap formation of the defense.

The roots of the option attack go back over a century to the earliest offensive systems of the modern game such as the T formation, Single-wing formation, and the Notre Dame Box, which were developed and widely utilized at all levels of play in the early 20th century. Option-based systems gradually lost favor in the college and pro game until the 1970s, when teams running the wishbone attack or its flexbone variant briefly dominated college football, spawning many imitators. Defenses had grown more accustomed to facing option attacks by the early 1980s, and the systems once again faded in popularity.

While many coaches at all levels include frequent RPOs and occasional read option plays in their offensive scheme, the triple option is a more specialized play that is almost exclusively run by teams employing an option-based system. Such systems have become rare in major college football and have not been used in the National Football League (NFL) for decades, mainly because of the risk of injury to a running quarterback. However, play concepts based on option-based systems are the foundation of the modern spread offense attack.

== Types ==
An option offense is any football scheme that relies on option running plays as its cornerstone. There are a variety of such schemes. Some of the most popular versions include:

The classic wishbone formation and the backfield set that gives it its name

Wishbone option offense
The wishbone offense, whose introduction to Football Bowl Subdivision (formerly Division I-A) college football is credited to Emory Bellard, is named after its base formation of a quarterback, a fullback aligned four to five yards behind the quarterback, and two halfbacks aligned on each side of the fullback and one yard to two yards deeper. The result is a backfield alignment that resembles the shape of a wishbone. Also called the triple-option, this base formation allows three basic running options: the fullback receiving the handoff, the quarterback pitching to either halfback, or the quarterback running the ball himself. While the wishbone's success reached its zenith in the 1970s, it remains popular at the high school and small college level but is nearly extinct at major college programs.
Wing T offense
The traditional "wing T" offense employs many of the concepts of the wishbone offense. It often employs three running back formations, especially in the Bay City version of the offense. The wing T helped change the game of football in its formative years, and changed the traditional role of the quarterback from a blocker much like a modern fullback in the classic "single wing", to the primary distributor of the ball. As the triple-option became prominent, the wing T quickly incorporated the veer into its arsenal. In conjunction, it tends to employ significantly more misdirection running plays. The traps, crosses, fakes, pulls, sweeps, and counters that characterize the wing T are often supplemented by a heavy dose of option runs—most notably the veer triple option. The veer is well suited to the wing T offense, especially the Delaware version. The Delaware version of the wing T, with its predominant two running back sets, gained significant prominence in the late 1970s and early 1980s and was most notably employed by the Notre Dame Fighting Irish during the Parseghian era. It continues to be employed by high schools and small college teams.
Flexbone option offense

The typical flexbone formation. This variation of the wishbone adds spread-like qualities to the standard triple-option configuration and is popular amongst service academies.

The "Flexbone" was invented by Emory Bellard at Mississippi State in 1979. It was called the "Wingbone", a variation of the Wishbone Bellard introduced at Texas. A variant of the wishbone offense, the flexbone came to prominence in the 1980s and 1990s. The flexbone offense varies from the wishbone in a few fundamental ways. First, and most notably, the flexbone replaces the halfbacks that are aligned in the backfield of a wishbone with one or two "wingbacks" or "slot backs," that align off-tackle or off-end. These "hybrid" players are typically very quick and must be adept at running, blocking (particularly cut blocking), and receiving. Because of their positioning, they can more easily facilitate the passing game in the flexbone and serve to stretch the defensive alignment laterally prior to the snap. Teams that employ this scheme tend to amass consistently high rushing averages. The name "flexbone" is somewhat controversial and usually reflects the school of thought from which the offense was born. Some practitioners, such as Air Force's famed former head coach, Fisher DeBerry, welcomed the name flexbone because the offense was seen as a modification of the traditional wishbone. Still others, such as Paul Johnson reject the moniker, preferring instead to call their systems, the "spread offense". To these practitioners, the offense is more related to spread schemes such as the run and shoot, and simply uses the triple-option as a foundation instead of a dynamic passing game. The offense was actually born in the latter school of practitioners, with its origins attributed to Paul Johnson while at Georgia Southern in the mid-80s. He brought the system briefly to Hawaiʻi in the late '80s and then returned to Georgia Southern, which won a record six Division I-AA national titles and eight conference titles while using this offense. As traditional wishbone coaches sought to make their offenses more dynamic, they began to mimic the alignments of this "spread offense" and re-dubbed it the flexbone. The name has since stuck, most likely in order to prevent confusion with other spread offenses. By the late '90s, the flexbone was adapted by all three NCAA Division I-A military academies, where it provided strong statistical results. After bringing Navy to its greatest run of success in decades, Johnson brought the offense with him to Georgia Tech, where it has achieved great success.
I-option offense
Also known as the "Nebraska I-offense," this offense derives its name from its extensive use of the I formation with its vertical alignment of quarterback, fullback, and running back. Though balanced attacks from the I formation have been around for decades, the I-option gained extraordinary popularity with its employment by Tom Osborne at the Nebraska Cornhuskers. Using this offense, Osborne had outstanding success from the time of its introduction in 1980 until his retirement in 1997, including three national championships. His successor, Frank Solich, continued to have success with the offense until his departure in 2003. The I-option offense offered a more traditional balanced attack. At its core, the offense relies on a devastating combination of power running, the option, and play-action passing, which are easily run from the I-formation and its variations. The concept of a balanced offensive attack combined with the big play potential of the option enticed vast numbers of top-level college teams to include some components of the Nebraska I.
Spread option offense

Emerging during the late 1990s and 2000s, the spread option is typically run from any variant of the shotgun formation, as in the example above. The "spread" allows teams to use speed and athleticism to exploit gaps created by the wide distribution of players.

The spread option offense is a variant of the more generic "spread offense". It has found success and widespread employment in college and high school football. Essentially a hybrid of the traditionally pass-oriented spread offense, the spread option is based on the concept of defensive isolation. The offense "spreads" the defense by aligning in three-to-five receiver sets, using two or fewer running backs in the backfield and often setting the quarterback in shotgun. This spread forces the defense to defend more of the field and isolates its players in space. To exploit this, the offense employs double or triple option plays which further mitigates the athleticism of the defense and forces it to play their assignments. When used in combination with a consistent passing game, the spread option offense can yield strong results. The means by which option plays are run from the spread option offense vary greatly.

The most popular running play employed in the spread is the read option. This play is also known as the zone read, QB choice, or QB wrap. A type of double option, the read option is a relatively simple play during which the offensive line zone blocks in one direction, ignoring defensive personnel, while the quarterback makes a single read (usually of the backside defensive end or linebacker) and decides whether to keep the ball (if the backside defender crashes down) or to hand off to the back (if the defender indicates that he will cover the quarterback). Some spread offenses employ complicated pre-snap motion schemes that move wide receivers or tight ends into formations in which they can either become ball carriers or run pass routes, allowing for additional possible options.

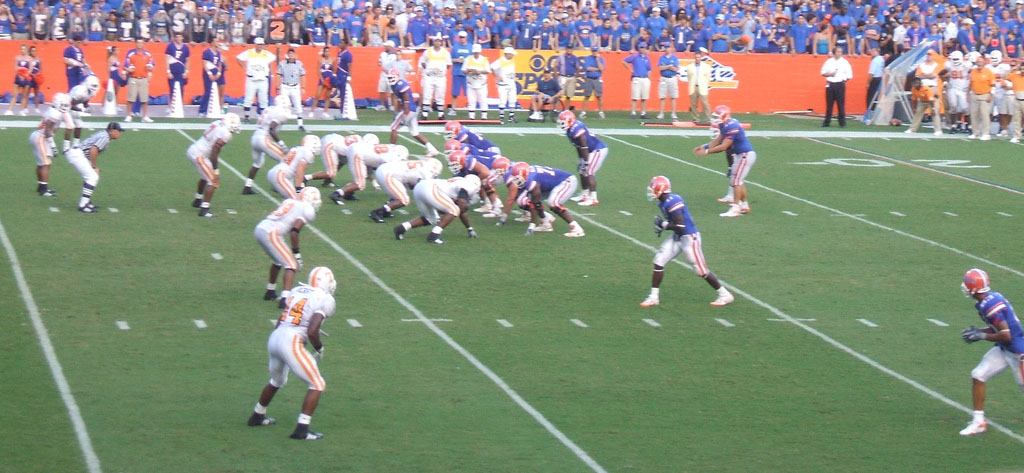
Urban Meyer's spread offense at Florida with QB Tim Tebow

Since the early 2000s, spread offenses have become very common, as they spread the defense to open running lanes for various option plays while also putting offensive players in favored matchups to allow for a prolific passing attack. The attack was initially developed in the college game, and Rich Rodriguez is generally credited with popularizing the zone read play run out of the shotgun formation while at West Virginia. Over the following seasons, other college coaches such as Urban Meyer (Utah, Florida, Ohio State), Bill Snyder (Kansas State), and Chip Kelly (Oregon, UCLA) developed formidable offenses based on spread option concepts.

== Option plays ==
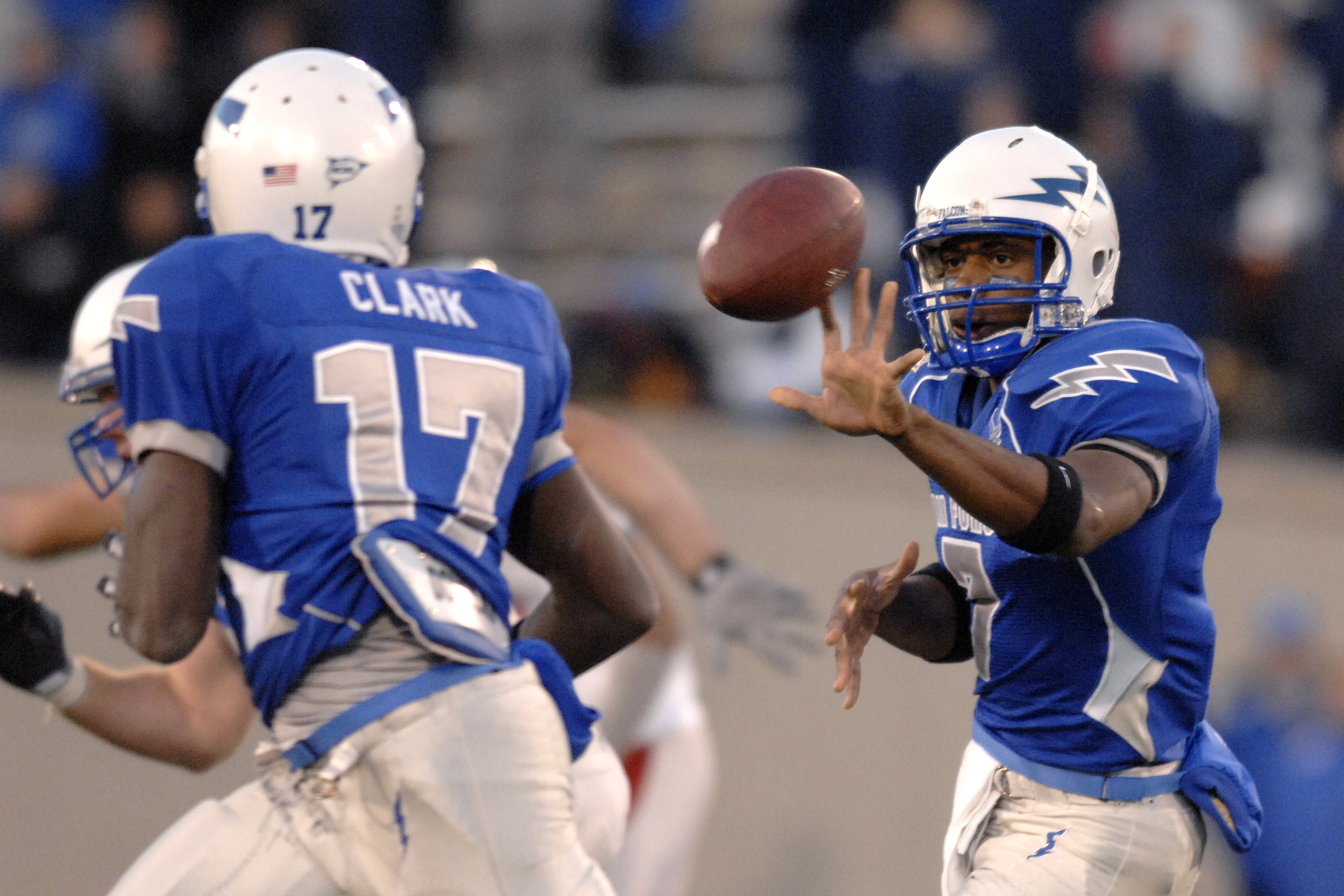
A QB pitches the ball.

At the heart of all option offenses is the option run. This relatively complicated running play may take on many forms. All option runs, however, rely on two common principles: Whereas the traditional running play typically designates the ballcarrier prior to the snap, the ballcarrier in a true option running play is determined by reading the defensive alignment or the actions of defensive players. This may occur at the line of scrimmage or after the ball is snapped. The second principle of the option run is that it must include two or more potential ballcarriers. These individuals each perform a predetermined route, or "track" that poses a unique threat to a defense. By threatening to attack the defense in multiple ways during the play based on the defense's own actions/alignment, the option run forces the opponent to maintain extraordinary discipline. Defenders must focus on their assignments, which stresses the defense and often mitigates its speed, size and aggressiveness. Consequently, option offenses are excellent for undersized teams.

=== Option runs ===
Option running plays are as numerous as the schemes that employ them. However, nearly all option running plays can be characterized as either a double option or triple option. This is determined by the number of choices available during the play.

- Triple option: In these highly complex running plays, three potential ballcarriers are available. The triple option typically features three components: a "dive" track, a "keep" track and "pitch" track. In its most generic version, the inside/outside veer, the dive track is typically carried out by a running back. At the snap of the ball, this player attacks the line of scrimmage somewhere between the offensive tackles (or end in the outside veer) as designated by the type of triple option play. This player is often the first choice in the triple option. His goal is to quickly attack the defensive interior in order to either pick up yardage or freeze the defense and prevent their pursuit to the outside. This quick surge into the interior of the defense is traditionally called a "dive". The quarterback determines whether to hand the ball to the fullback by reading a "dive key" - usually a defensive end. If the dive key does not try to tackle the running back the quarterback will hand the ball off to him. Alternatively, if the defender attempts to tackle the running back, the quarterback will keep the ball himself. This decision usually takes place while both the dive back and the quarterback are holding the football in an intricate exchange called the "mesh". On the keep track, the quarterback may run upfield for yardage or pitch the ball to another ballcarrier on the "pitch" track. This player is called the "pitch back" and the quarterback determines whether or not to pitch the ball by reading the "pitch key" - usually a linebacker or defensive back.
- Double option: The double option is an effective cousin of the triple option. As the name indicates, the double option provides only two potential ballcarriers instead of three. Yet it often relies on speed, or misdirection to compensate for the reduction.
- Read option: Developed in the 1990s, this play is typically run out of the shotgun formation in a spread offense. The quarterback "reads" the defensive end on the side in which the play is designed to go. If the defensive end is playing outside the tackle after the snap of the ball, the quarterback hands the ball off to the running back, who runs up the middle, away from the end. If the defensive end moves inside at the snap, the quarterback fakes a handoff to the running back and runs the ball to the outside while the offensive tackle occupies the defensive end. Though simple in concept, the play can be very effective if linebackers and defensive backs do not quickly arrive to provide run support. To further pressure the defense, the play can also include an RPO component, which adds a quick pass to the QB's possible options depending on his read of the opponents' reactions.

This read option has been a staple of the college game since the early 2000s and has been successfully utilized by many mobile quarterbacks, most notably national championship winning QBs Vince Young at Texas, Tim Tebow at Florida, and Cam Newton at Auburn, among many other quarterbacks who found team and individual success running a variation of the spread option offense with an emphasis on read option plays.

NFL coaches are generally disinclined to utilize option-based plays very often, as they can result in their valuable quarterback taking hard hits while running the ball. The read option is more often used as an occasional change of pace, particularly against an aggressive defense that is focused on stopping the running back. Only a handful of professional teams with durable and mobile quarterbacks make the play a regular part of their offense, most notably the Baltimore Ravens, which used option concepts to set an NFL team rushing record in 2019 behind league MVP Lamar Jackson, who also set a new season record for rushing yards by a QB (1,206).

=== Run-pass option (RPO) ===
The RPO has become widely used in both college and professional football. While most previous option plays included several possible options for running the ball, most RPOs give the quarterback the possibility of handing off the ball, running it himself, or passing the ball. The "read" in an RPO is often based on the movement of a single defender, usually a linebacker or safety. If the quarterback reads the targeted defender as defending the run, he will pass. If the read is the defender stays put or appears to be involved in pass defense, the quarterback can hand the ball to a running back or, in some versions, run the ball himself. The idea is to choose the option that gives the offense a numerical advantage.

Because the quarterback makes the decision to run or pass after the snap of the ball, the other offensive players' assignments are a mixture of those usually used during a run or pass play, with receivers going out on pass routes and the offensive line engaging in run blocking. However, because offensive linemen are not allowed to stray much beyond the line of scrimmage before a pass is thrown, the quarterback must quickly make a decision to throw or run before his team incurs a penalty.

== Modern use ==
Option-based offenses are most frequently utilized in the high school and collegiate ranks. It is rarely used in the National Football League for several reasons, most importantly because quarterbacks often run with the ball themselves in option plays, resulting in frequent hits. Few professional coaches are willing to assume the increased risk of injury for the player who is usually the highest paid and most important player on the team.

=== Use in college football ===
Various option-based offenses were by far the most common in the early years of college football, and with several schools winning national championships with the new wishbone attack in the 1970s, the option offense enjoyed a renaissance during that decade and beyond. However, the wishbone's effectiveness waned as defensive schemes were designed to slow it down. By 2000, almost all major college programs had abandoned option attacks for "pro-style" offenses the utilized more passing and attract athletes who had aspirations to play in the NFL, where option offenses had fallen out of favor decades earlier.

While very few teams run pure option attacks, some option concepts and plays have been incorporated into newer offensive schemes in recent years. In the early 2000s, Urban Meyer and other coaches found success with the spread offense, which incorporates elements of an option-based running game while utilizing the shotgun formation and including much more of a passing game than a traditional option scheme. Meyer visited Kansas State University's Bill Snyder and learned the principles of his system. These combine elements of the West Coast offense and the single wing with sorted elements of the flexbone and the wishbone. Meyer used his spread option offense with great success at Bowling Green, Utah, and Florida, where he won two national titles, and at Ohio State, where he won an additional national championship.

Meyer's version is based on the spread attack developed by then-West Virginia coach Rich Rodriguez. Rodriguez earned "pioneer" status for incorporating wishbone principles, such as the zone-read and option pitches, into the primarily passing-oriented spread offense. However, it is unclear whether Rodriguez developed the system, Kansas State coach Bill Snyder developed the zone-read philosophy with QB Michael Bishop in the late 1990s, or whether the two coaches coincidentally developed the system at the same time.

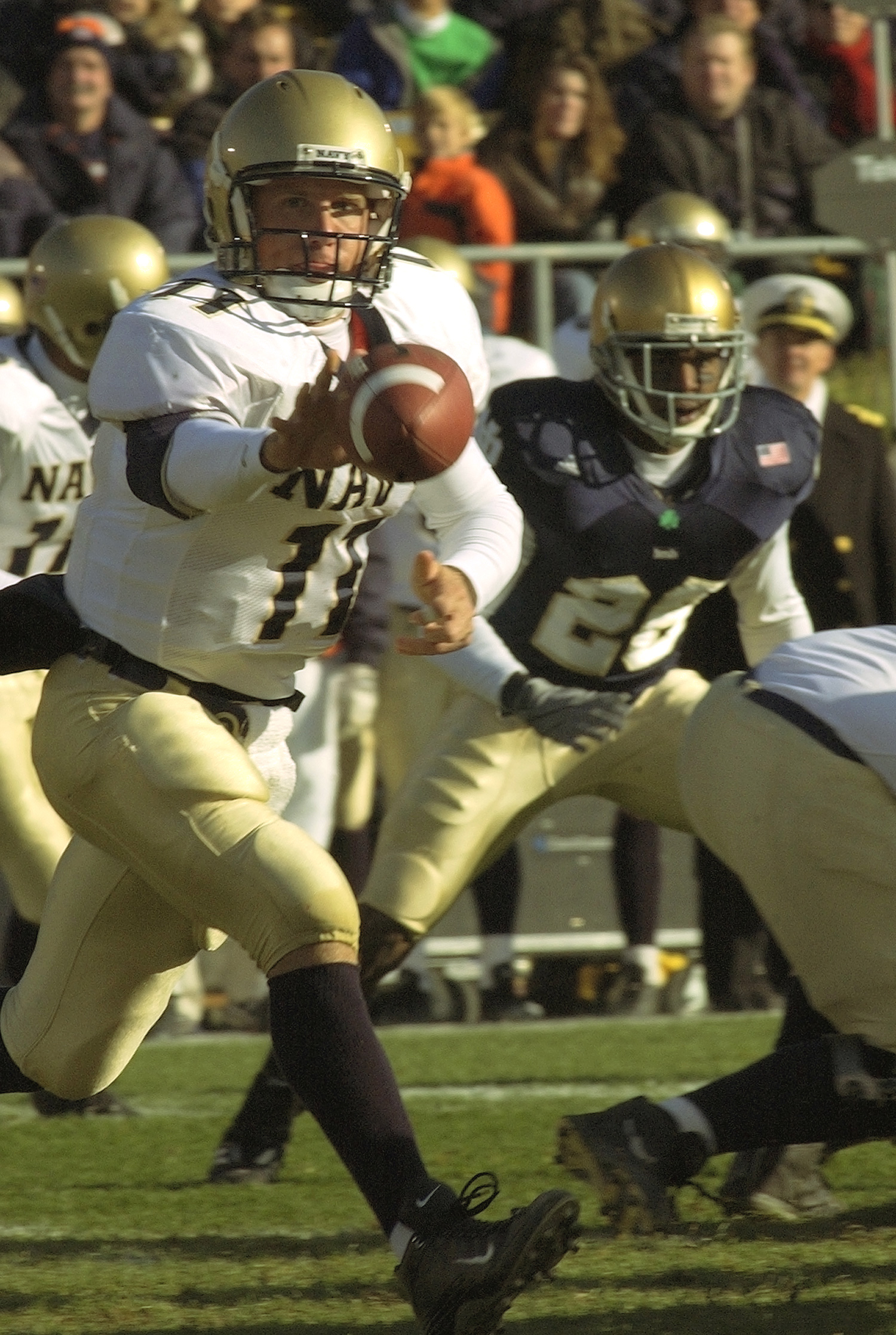
A lateral during an option play.

The option remains popular at mid-major levels as well. The Appalachian State Mountaineers, who won three consecutive titles in Division I FCS from 2005 through 2007, rely on the spread option offense. Additionally, the Cal Poly Mustangs achieved success with its flexbone-style option offense under former head coach Rich Ellerson, who has since installed the offense at Army. Lenoir–Rhyne played for an NCAA DII National Championship in 2013 running the flexbone. Carson–Newman, Eastern New Mexico, and Harding have had a great deal of success running the triple option at the NCAA Division II level.

Option offenses are considered to be "equalizers" on the playing field – allowing less athletic teams to compete with larger and faster defenses, particularly since there are few teams that run the scheme and defensive players and coaches may not be adept at stopping it. Appalachian State proved this theory by defeating the heralded Michigan Wolverines at Michigan Stadium during the 2007 NCAA season. In 2013 Georgia Southern (FCS at the time) defeated Florida and in 2015 Citadel (FCS) defeated South Carolina.

Option offenses remain very popular among the United States service academies, who do not always have the specialized personnel required to successfully run a pro-style offense against top college competition. The Navy Midshipmen, Army Black Knights, and Air Force Falcons each use option offenses. If run properly, an option offense should be able to gain 2-3 yards before the linebackers and defensive backs can identify who has the football and make a tackle. Due in part to this, Navy rarely punts the ball, which has led many Navy fans to jokingly refer to 4th down (normally a punting situation) as "just another down." Coach Paul Johnson was particularly effective using this offensive scheme, leading Navy to 43 victories between 2003 and 2007, and Navy led the nation in rushing yards and rushing touchdowns in 2007. He left Navy for Georgia Tech after the 2007 season, where he continued to successfully run the option until his retirement in 2018.

Former Army coach Bob Sutton joked that the Army–Navy Game could be played in an hour because the game clock rarely stopped due to both teams running option schemes. After Sutton's firing, Army went away from the option in favor of a Pro Style attack under new head coach Todd Berry. After eight years of poor performance on the field (with a record of 17-76 from 2000–2007 including the only 0-13 season in NCAA history), Army returned to a flexbone triple-option scheme in the 2008 season. Many Army alumni pushed for a return to an option-based offense in hopes of regaining the success they saw under head coach Jim Young in the 1980s and early 1990s. Under Young, from 1983–1990, the cadets went 51-39-1, including 3 bowl appearances. With the beginning of spring practice 2008, Army coach Stan Brock closed practices to the fans and media in order to install the new offensive scheme. In mid-April, the Times-Herald Record broke the silence and eased alumni concerns by announcing that Brock and Army would return to the triple-option offense for the 2008 season. Though Army improved statistically, they failed to achieve a winning season, and in December 2008, Army Athletic Director, Kevin Anderson announced Brock's dismissal after only two seasons. Later that month, the team welcomed famed Cal Poly head coach Rich Ellerson as the 36th head coach at West Point. In his first season (2009) on the banks of the Hudson, Ellerson implemented his version of the option and led the Cadets to a 5-7 season. The team showed a marked improvement from the previous 10 years, missing a bowl game by one game.

The United States Air Force Academy also ran the option successfully under coach Fisher DeBerry, often having a run offense near the top of the NCAA. Falcons option quarterback Dee Dowis was a finalist for the Heisman Trophy in 1989, setting an NCAA record for rushing by a quarterback, with 3,612 yards. The option helped the team win the Commander-in-Chief's Trophy 16 times, the most among the three major football-playing service academies.

Current Army head coach Jeff Monken has extensive experience running the option. Before taking over the Army program in December 2013 he served as head coach of Georgia Southern University. His experience working under Paul Johnson at Georgia Southern, Navy and Georgia Tech made him an attractive choice for the position.

=== Use in professional football ===
Until recently, the option has made rare appearances in the NFL. An article on the option play in the ESPN College Football Encyclopedia discussed why the option was not used as much in the pros. While coaches agreed the option would work, the problem was the impact it would have on the quarterback. The quarterback would need to run more which means taking more hits, causing greater risk of injury. Starting in 2004, Michael Vick, Warrick Dunn and T. J. Duckett ran the option with a degree of success not seen in the NFL before. In a December 2007 game against the New England Patriots, the New York Jets ran the option with quarterback Brad Smith, substituting Smith for starter Chad Pennington.

In the 2008 AFC championship, Ravens QB Joe Flacco ran a QB option tucking the ball for a 5-yard gain and a first down on crucial third down. The Ravens offense was known for mixing up its game plan, and although Flacco is not known for his speed, the deception employed by Baltimore allowed for Flacco to mix up plays successfully despite an AFC championship game loss.

In the 2009 season, the New York Jets ran the option numerous times, with Brad Smith. Each play produced positive yards. The Tennessee Titans also ran the option when Vince Young was re-installed as quarterback. In addition, the option helped Chris Johnson rush for 2,000 yards.

On October 9, 2011, the Carolina Panthers effectively ran the option twice against the New Orleans Saints. The first play was an option pitch from QB Cam Newton to RB DeAngelo Williams for a 67-yard touchdown. The second time, Cam Newton kept the ball and ran for 13 yards.

A month later, the Denver Broncos ran seventeen plays with Tim Tebow as quarterback and Willis McGahee as running back totalling 298 yards on the ground. The option was so effective that the Broncos played it almost exclusively in the fourth quarter of the 38-24 win over the Oakland Raiders, continued using it a week later in a 17-10 win over the Kansas City Chiefs, and again employed it a week later in an overtime win over San Diego. In that win over San Diego, Tim Tebow set an NFL record 22 rushing attempts by a quarterback in one game. The 2011 Denver Broncos, with Tebow at quarterback, have been the most successful team in the NFL to run a read-option offense.

The 2012 season saw more NFL teams adopt the option offense, the most prominent being the Washington Redskins, the Seattle Seahawks and the San Francisco 49ers. 49ers quarterback Colin Kaepernick rushed for 181 yards (an NFL single game record for a QB) on 16 carries using the read option out of the pistol formation vs. the Green Bay Packers in a Divisional Playoff game on January 12, 2013. As a team, the San Francisco 49ers rushed for 323 yards on 43 carries.

The 2013 season saw University of Oregon's head coach Chip Kelly move to the NFL to take the head coaching job for the Philadelphia Eagles. At the start of the season, Michael Vick was named the starting QB and the read option was used with Vick's athletic ability to take advantage of running situations for the quarterback. However, by the 6th week, Vick was injured and Nick Foles took over as starter. Even though Foles had less running ability than Vick, the read option was continued and used successfully. The theory that the read option can work even with pocket passers is that as long as the quarterback can get positive yardage, big gains are not necessary as it keeps the defense honest.

The Run-Pass Option (RPO) has become a more popular play used in the NFL. This adds the passing element to the option offense. After the snap, the quarterback can decide whether to hand off, keep, or pass.

While no NFL team utilizes the option offense as their primary offensive system, variations like the zone read and RPO's have become standard components of many modern NFL playbooks.

== Teams that have or currently run an option offense ==
- 2025-present: Rice (Pistol)
- 1970–present: Navy (Veer/Flexbone)
- 1971–1982: Alabama (Wishbone)
- 1971–1988: Oklahoma (Wishbone)
- 1980–2003: Nebraska (I-Formation)
- 1982–present: Air Force (Veer/Wishbone/Flexbone)
- 1982–1989: Georgia Southern (Flexbone/Spread Option)
- 1984–1988: Arkansas (Wishbone/Flexbone)
- 1985–1991: Colorado (Wishbone/I-Bone)
- 1986–1996: Notre Dame (Wishbone/Flexbone)
- 1987–1994: Hawaii (Flexbone)
- 1988–present: Wofford Terriers (Wingbone/Wishbone)
- 1991–2001: Syracuse (Freeze)
- 1994–2006: Eastern New Mexico (Wishbone/I Bone/Flexbone)
- 1994–2005: Rice (Flexbone)
- 1997–2005: Georgia Southern (Flexbone)
- 2005-2008 West Virginia (Zone-Read Shotgun)
- 2008–2019: Georgia Tech (Flexbone)
- 2010–2021: Georgia Southern (Flexbone)
- 2001–present: Carson–Newman (Veer)
- 2004–present: Nevada (Pistol)
- 2009–present: Army (Flexbone)
- 2009-present: Cal Poly (Veer)
- 2010–present: The Citadel (Flexbone)
- 2010–present: Auburn (Read Option)
- 2012–present: Eastern New Mexico (Flexbone)
- 2017–present: Coastal Carolina (Spread Option)
- 2021-present: Philadelphia Eagles (Read Option)

=== Particularly dominant teams ===
- 1971 Oklahoma: Went 11–1 and scored 530 points.
- 1972 Oklahoma: Went 11–1 and scored 399 points.
- 1973 Alabama: Went 11–1 and scored 477 points.
- 1973 Oklahoma: Went 10–0–1 and scored 400 points.
- 1974 Oklahoma: Went 11–0 and scored 473 points, winning the national championship.
- 1975 Alabama: Went 11–1 and scored 374 points.
- 1975 Oklahoma: Went 11–1 and scored 344 points, winning the national championship.
- 1977 Alabama: Went 11–1 and scored 380 points.
- 1978 Oklahoma: Went 11–1 and scored 471 points.
- 1979 Alabama: Went 12–0 and scored 383 points, winning the national championship.
- 1979 Oklahoma: Went 11–1 and scored 409 points.
- 1980 Nebraska: Went 10-2 and scored 470 points.
- 1981 Nebraska: Went 9-3 and scored 364 points.
- 1982 Nebraska: Went 12–1 and scored 514 points.
- 1983 Air Force: Went 10–2 and scored 367 points.
- 1983 Nebraska: Went 12–1 and scored 654 points.
- 1984 Nebraska: Went 10-2 and scored 387 points.
- 1985 Air Force: Went 12–1 and scored 470 points.
- 1985 Georgia Southern: 13–2 and scored 460 points, winning the Division I-AA national championship.
- 1985 Oklahoma: Went 11–1 and scored 371 points, winning the national championship.
- 1986 Georgia Southern: 13–2 and scored 619 points, winning the Division I-AA national championship.
- 1986 Oklahoma: Went 11–1 and scored 508 points.
- 1987 Oklahoma: Went 11–1 and scored 493 points.
- 1988 Arkansas: Went 10–2 and scored 349 points.
- 1988 Georgia Southern: 12–3 and scored 469 points.
- 1988 Notre Dame: Went 12–0 and scored 339 points.
- 1989 Arkansas: Went 10–2 and scored 385 points.
- 1989 Colorado: Went 11–1 and scored 458 points.
- 1989 Georgia Southern: Went 15–0 and scored 584 points, winning the Division I-AA national championship.
- 1989 Notre Dame: Went 12–1 and scored 427 points.
- 1990 Colorado: Went 11–1–1 and scored 399 points, winning a share of the national championship.
- 1990 Georgia Southern: Went 12-3 and scored 436 points, winning the Division I-AA national championship.
- 1991 Air Force: Went 10–3 and scored 382 points.
- 1991 Syracuse: Went 10–2 and scored 321 points.
- 1992 Hawaii: Went 11–2 and scored 421 points.
- 1992 Notre Dame: Went 10–1–1 and scored 437 points.
- 1992 Syracuse: Went 10–2 and scored 340 points.
- 1993 Notre Dame: Went 11–1 and scored 427 points.
- 1993 Nebraska: Went 11-1 and scored 407 points
- 1994 Nebraska: Went 13–0 and scored 459 points, winning the national championship.
- 1995 Nebraska: Went 12–0 and scored 639 points, winning the national championship.
- 1996 Army: Went 10–2 and scored 379 points.
- 1996 Nebraska: Went 11-2 and scored 553 points.
- 1997 Air Force: Went 10–3 and scored 279 points.
- 1997 Nebraska: Went 13–0 and scored 607 points, winning a share of the national championship.
- 1998 Air Force: Went 12–1 and scored 468 points.
- 1998 Georgia Southern: Went 14–1 and scored 654 points.
- 1999 Georgia Southern: Went 13–2 and scored 747 points, winning the Division I-AA national championship.
- 2000 Georgia Southern: Went 13–2 and scored 506 points, winning the Division I-AA national championship.
- 2001 Georgia Southern: Went 12–2 and scored 525 points.
- 2002 Georgia Southern: Went 11–3 and scored 493 points.
- 2005 West Virginia: Went 11-1 7-0 in conference and upset heavily favored Georgia in the Sugar Bowl. Led by freshmen Pat White and Steve Slayton who combined for over 2,000 yards rushing.
- 2005 Texas: Went 13-0 and scored 662 points, winning the BCS national championship.
- 2006 West Virginia: Went 11-2.Led by sophomores Pat White and Steve Slayton who combined for over 3,000 yards rushing.
- 2007 West Virginia: Went 11-2 and upset heavily favored Oklahoma in the Fiesta Bowl.
- 2009 Georgia Tech: Went 11–3 and scored 473 points.
- 2010 Auburn: Went 14–0 and scored 577 points, winning the BCS national championship.
- 2011 Georgia Southern: Went 11–3 and scored 492 points.
- 2013 Auburn: Went 12–2 and scored 553 points, BCS runner-up.
- 2014 Air Force: Went 10–3 and scored 409 points.
- 2014 Georgia Tech: Went 11–3 and scored 530 points.
- 2015 Navy: Went 11–2 and scored 478 points.
- 2017 Army: Went 10–3 and scored 399 points with 20 pass completions and 785 carries.
- 2018 Army: Went 11–2 and finished ranked 19th in AP Poll.
- 2019 Navy: Went 11-2 and scored 483 points, winning the Liberty Bowl.
