= Run-pass option =

Option play in gridiron football

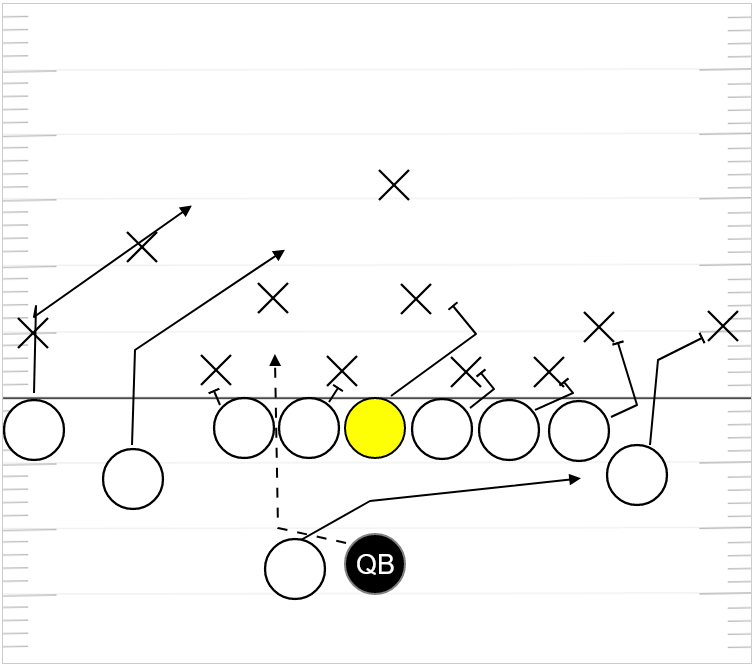
A double-slant RPO against a 4-3 cover 6-aligned defense

The run-pass option (RPO) is a type of designed option play in American football in which the offensive team has the ability to either rush or pass the ball depending on the alignment and actions of defensive team. Like the standard read-option, the quarterback is responsible for viewing the actions of a particular defender (the "read man") and makes a decision to hand the ball off to their running back depending on how that defender chooses to act after the snap of the ball. However, unlike the read-option, the quarterback is responsible for making a decision regarding whether or not to throw a play-action pass to a receiver running a designed route, rather than simply the decision to keep the ball and run with it.

== History ==
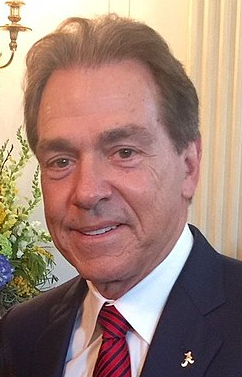
Nick Saban has been a critic of the rules change that preceded the development of the run-pass option

The run-pass option is a development of the triple option that became popular after a 2009 revision to the NCAA rulebook. This rule change allowed linemen to advance three yards downfield prior to a forward pass being thrown. Previously linemen had been restricted to blocking just one yard downfield on pass plays. The additional downfield blocking greatly assisted the wide receiver's ability to run after the catch. As such, the RPO became a staple of many successful college team playbooks.

There were many notable critics of the RPO, including former Alabama Crimson Tide Football head coach Nick Saban. Critics of the RPO's adoption within college football generally argued that the rule changes that enabled the RPO had made the game unbalanced by allowing linemen to block so far downfield on passing plays, which was exacerbated by the failure of referees to properly penalize linemen who blocked too far downfield. Just prior to the 2016 college football season, the NCAA proposed to restore the pre-2009 rule, which would have had the effect of restricting the efficacy of the RPO, but declined to do so after a large number of coaches expressed their discontent with the proposed rule change.

The RPO has since spread beyond college football, becoming a part of professional offenses in the National Football League. By 2018, the RPO had entered the playbooks of NFL teams including the Chicago Bears, Carolina Panthers, and Cincinnati Bengals.

== Strategy ==
=== College football ===
In college football, the relatively lax definition of an illegal man downfield allows for RPOs to involve heavy downhill running plays and vertical passing attacks. The extra space downfield that linemen are allowed to advance allows more time for passing plays to develop and allows for linemen to engage with linebackers in order to support a downhill run.

=== NFL ===
In the National Football League, the use of the RPO is more restricted than in college football due to its more stringent criteria for an illegal man downfield penalty. As such, passes tend to be quick-hitting and near the line of scrimmage, and linemen are less able to engage with second-level defenders.

== Examples ==
There are several run-pass option plays that have become commonplace, even earning adoption in the NFL. One common such RPO involves a slot receiver running a slant route run alongside an inside zone read.
