= 2018 Arizona Wildcats football team =

American college football season

2018 Arizona Wildcats football
- Conference: Pac-12 Conference
- South Division
- Record: 5–7 (4–5 Pac-12)
- Head coach: Kevin Sumlin (1st season)
- Offensive coordinator: Noel Mazzone (1st season)
- Offensive scheme: Spread
- Defensive coordinator: Marcel Yates (3rd season)
- Base defense: 4–2–5
- Captain: 4: Khalil Tate (QB); J. J. Taylor (RB); Jace Whittaker (CB); Colin Schooler (LB)
- Home stadium: Arizona Stadium

Uniform
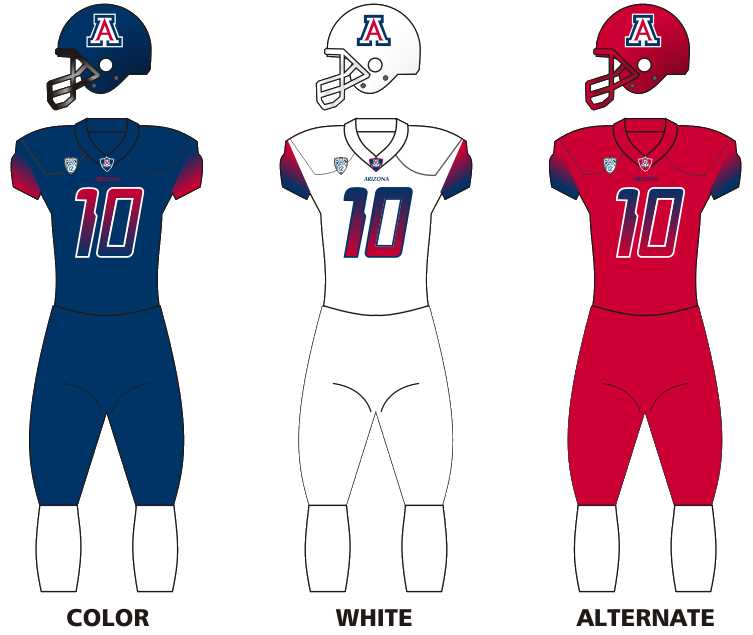

2018 Pac-12 Conference football standings
	Conf.			Overall
Team	W		L	W		L
North Division
No. 13 Washington xy$	7	–	2	10	–	4
No. 10 Washington State x	7	–	2	11	–	2
Stanford	6	–	3	9	–	4
Oregon	5	–	4	9	–	4
California	4	–	5	7	–	6
Oregon State	1	–	8	2	–	10
South Division
Utah xy	6	–	3	9	–	5
Arizona State	5	–	4	7	–	6
USC	4	–	5	5	–	7
Arizona	4	–	5	5	–	7
UCLA	3	–	6	3	–	9
Colorado	2	–	7	5	–	7
Championship: Washington 10, Utah 3
$ – Conference champion; x – Division champion/co-champions; y – Championship game participant; Rankings from AP Poll

The 2018 Arizona Wildcats football team represented the University of Arizona in the 2018 NCAA Division I FBS football season. The season marked the Wildcats's 119th season. They played their home games at the Arizona Stadium in Tucson, Arizona (for the 90th year) and competed members of the South Division (8th season) in the Pac-12 Conference (41st overall season). They were led by first-year head coach Kevin Sumlin. The Wildcats finished the season 5–7 and did not qualify for a bowl game. They went 4–5 in Pac-12 play, tying USC for third place in the South Division.

== Offseason ==
=== Offseason departures ===
The Wildcats have 17 senior graduates only graduated players noted until spring practice. As well as one junior who would choose to forgo their senior season in pursuit of an earlier NFL career. The Wildcats would lose four more players from the 2017 team due to various reasons. Notable departures from the 2017 squad included.

Name	Position	Year	Reason
Donavan Tate	QB	FR	Left from team
Nick Wilson	RB	SR	Graduation
Zach Green	RB	rSR	Graduation
Tyrell Johnson	WR	SR	Graduation
Zach Benjamin	WR	rSR	Graduation
Trevor Wood	TE	rJR	Chose to graduate and transfer
Gerhard de Beer	OL	rSR	Graduation/NFL
Jacob Alsadek	OL	rSR	Graduation
De’Andre Miller	DE	rSR	Graduation
Jack Banda	DE	rSR	Graduation
Brandon Rutt	LB	JR	Chose to graduate and transfer
Brandon Dawkins	QB	rJR	Chose to graduate and transfer
Isaiah Strong	LB	SR	Graduation
Christian Boettcher	OL	SR	Graduation
Parker Zellers	DL	rSR	Graduation
Marcus Griffin	DL	rJR	Chose to graduate and transfer
Dane Cruikshank	CB	rSR	Graduation/NFL
Kwesi Mashack	CB	SR	Graduation
Luca Bruno	DL	rSR	Graduation
Larry Tharpe Jr.	LB	rJR	Declared for the 2018 NFL draft.
Jarvis McCall Jr.	S	SR	Graduation
Francisco Nelson	DE	rSO	Elected to transfer

=== Recruiting ===
On December 20, 2017, NCAA Football started the first ever early signing period which they signed 15 recruits. On the national signing day the Wildcats received 2 more high school recruits tipping off the signing period with a total of 20 high school recruits, 1 walk-on HS recruit, 2 JUCO transfers and 4 college transfers which totals 28 total recruits in the 2018 offseason.

College recruiting
Name	Hometown	School	Height	Weight	Commit date
Jaden Mitchell; WR	Las Vegas, NV	Desert Oasis HS	5 ft 11 in (1.80 m)	175 lb (79 kg)	Apr 28, 2017
Jaden Mitchell; WR	Recruit ratings: Scout: Rivals: 247Sports: ESPN: (78)				
David Watson; OT	Tucson, AZ	Amphi HS	6 ft 5 in (1.96 m)	300 lb (140 kg)	Apr 8, 2017
David Watson; OT	Recruit ratings: Scout: Rivals: 247Sports: ESPN: (78)				
Jamarye Joiner; QB	Vail, AZ	Cienega HS	6 ft 2 in (1.88 m)	197 lb (89 kg)	Sep 25, 2016
Jamarye Joiner; QB	Recruit ratings: Scout: Rivals: 247Sports: ESPN: (76)				
Jhevon Hill; ATH	San Bernardino, CA	Cajon HS	6 ft 2 in (1.88 m)	178 lb (81 kg)	Jul 29, 2017
Jhevon Hill; ATH	Recruit ratings: Scout: Rivals: 247Sports: ESPN: (76)				
Mykee Irving; DT	Calabasas, CA	Calabasas HS	6 ft 3 in (1.91 m)	333 lb (151 kg)	Aug 10, 2017
Mykee Irving; DT	Recruit ratings: Scout: Rivals: 247Sports: ESPN: (76)				
Darrius Smith; RB	Pearland, TX	Glenda Dawson HS	5 ft 9 in (1.75 m)	170 lb (77 kg)	Jun 30, 2017
Darrius Smith; RB	Recruit ratings: Scout: Rivals: 247Sports: ESPN: (74)				
Adam Plant; DE	Las Vegas, NV	Bishop Gorman HS	6 ft 5 in (1.96 m)	244 lb (111 kg)	Nov 19, 2017
Adam Plant; DE	Recruit ratings: Scout: Rivals: 247Sports: ESPN: (74)				
Trey Adams; WR	Frisco, TX	Wakeland HS	6 ft 3 in (1.91 m)	178 lb (81 kg)	Oct 4, 2017
Trey Adams; WR	Recruit ratings: Scout: Rivals: 247Sports: ESPN: (74)				
Donovan Laie; OG	Oceanside, CA	Oceanside HS	6 ft 4 in (1.93 m)	302 lb (137 kg)	Oct 23, 2017
Donovan Laie; OG	Recruit ratings: Scout: Rivals: 247Sports: ESPN: (74)				
Zach Williams; WR	Alpharetta, GA	Johns Creek HS	6 ft 3 in (1.91 m)	198 lb (90 kg)	Oct 26, 2017
Zach Williams; WR	Recruit ratings: Scout: Rivals: 247Sports: ESPN: (73)				
Jake Peters; TE	Santa Margarita, CA	Santa Margarita Catholic HS	6 ft 4 in (1.93 m)	236 lb (107 kg)	Sep 10, 2017
Jake Peters; TE	Recruit ratings: Scout: Rivals: 247Sports: ESPN: (73)				
Issaiah Johnson; ILB	Los Alamitos, CA	Los Alamitos HS	6 ft 2 in (1.88 m)	220 lb (100 kg)	May 15, 2017
Issaiah Johnson; ILB	Recruit ratings: Scout: Rivals: 247Sports: ESPN: (73)				
McKenzie Barnes; CB	Fresno, CA	Edison HS	6 ft 1 in (1.85 m)	167 lb (76 kg)	Aug 12, 2017
McKenzie Barnes; CB	Recruit ratings: Scout: Rivals: 247Sports: ESPN: (73)				
Christian Young; S	Richmond, TX	Foster HS	6 ft 2 in (1.88 m)	200 lb (91 kg)	Nov 15, 2017
Christian Young; S	Recruit ratings: Scout: Rivals: 247Sports: ESPN: (72)				
Jailen Bailey; WR	San Diego, CA	Abraham Lincoln HS	5 ft 10 in (1.78 m)	180 lb (82 kg)	Nov 19, 2017
Jailen Bailey; WR	Recruit ratings: Scout: Rivals: 247Sports: ESPN: (78)				
Nahe Sulunga; DT	Calabasas, CA	Calabasas HS	6 ft 3 in (1.91 m)	252 lb (114 kg)	Dec 1, 2017
Nahe Sulunga; DT	Recruit ratings: Scout: Rivals: 247Sports: ESPN: (74)				
Thomas Marcus; WR	San Diego, CA	San Diego HS	6 ft 3 in (1.91 m)	185 lb (84 kg)	Oct 14, 2017
Thomas Marcus; WR	Recruit ratings: Scout: Rivals: 247Sports: ESPN: (77)				
Steven Bailey; OG	Peoria, AZ	Glendale CC (JC)	6 ft 3 in (1.91 m)	300 lb (140 kg)	Dec 3, 2017
Steven Bailey; OG	Recruit ratings: Scout: Rivals: 247Sports: ESPN: (74)				
P. J. Johnson; DT	Sacramento, CA	City College of San Francisco (JC)	6 ft 5 in (1.96 m)	315 lb (143 kg)	Dec 20, 2017
P. J. Johnson; DT	Recruit ratings: Scout: Rivals: 247Sports: ESPN: (75)				
Dayven Coleman; S	Mesquite, TX	West Mesquite HS	6 ft 0 in (1.83 m)	196 lb (89 kg)	Feb 6, 2018
Dayven Coleman; S	Recruit ratings: Scout: Rivals: 247Sports: ESPN: (77)				
Geno Albini; LS	Wimberley, TX	Wimberley HS	5 ft 11 in (1.80 m)	210 lb (95 kg)	Walk-On (02/03/18)
Geno Albini; LS	Recruit ratings: No ratings found				
Kevin Doyle; QB	West Chester, PA	St. John’s College HS	6 ft 4 in (1.93 m)	210 lb (95 kg)	Feb 7, 2018
Kevin Doyle; QB	Recruit ratings: Scout: Rivals: 247Sports: ESPN: (80)				
Overall recruit ranking: Scout: #40 Rivals: #37 247Sports: #40 ESPN: #26
‡ Refers to 40-yard dash; Note: In many cases, Scout, Rivals, 247Sports, On3, and ESPN may conflict in their listings of height, weight and 40 time.; In these cases, the average was taken. ESPN grades are on a 100-point scale.; Sources: "Arizona Football Commitment List". Rivals.; "2018 Arizona Commits". Scout.; "2018 Player Commitments – Arizona". ESPN.; "Scout.com Team Recruiting Rankings". Scout.; "2018 Team Ranking". Rivals.com.; "2018 Arizona Wildcats football team". 247Sports.

=== Incoming transfers ===
In addition to the 2018 recruiting class, Arizona add two JC transfer players from junior college and six transfer players from college, which includes eligible for the current season, to the 2018 roster:

List of incoming transfers
Name	Pos.	Eligible beginning	Years of eligibility	Previous school	Notes
P. J. Johnson	DT	2018	2	Sacramento State	Junior college transfer from City College of San Francisco.
Steven Bailey	OG	2018	2	Northern Arizona	Junior college transfer from Glendale C.C.
Keyshawn Johnson Jr.	WR	2018	4	Nebraska	Transfer from Nebraska. He is expected to be eligible for the 2018 season.
Dylan Klumph	P	2018	1	California	Graduate Transfer from California. He is expected to be eligible for Arizona this year.
Tim Hough	CB	2018	1	UNLV	Graduate Transfer from UNLV. He is expected to be eligible for Arizona this year.
Robert Congel	OL	2018	3	Texas A&M	Transfer from Texas A&M. He will likely to sit out for the 2018 season.
Joshua Szott	WR	2018	4	Colgate	Transfer from Colgate. He is expected to be eligible for the 2018 season.
Santino Marchiol	LB	2018	4	Texas A&M	Transfer from Texas A&M. He will likely to sit out for the 2018 season.

=== Returning starters ===
Arizona returns 30 starters in 2018, including 15 on offense, 9 on defense, and 5 on special teams.

Offensive starters

Returning offensive starters
Player	Class	Position
Khalil Tate (14)	Junior	Quarterback
Nathan Tilford (33)	Sophomore	Running back
J. J. Taylor (23)	RS sophomore	Running back
DeVaughn Cooper (7)	RS sophomore	Wide receiver
Shun Brown (6)	Senior	Wide receiver
Shawn Poindexter (19)	Senior	Wide receiver
Tony Ellison (9)	RS senior	Wide receiver
Cedric Peterson (18)	Senior	Wide receiver
Layth Friekh (58)	RS senior	Left tackle
Josh McCauley (50)	RS freshman	Left tackle
Bryce Wolma (81)	Sophomore	Tight end
Alex Kosinski (74)	RS sophomore	Right guard
Cody Creason (76)	RS junior	Right tackle
Nathan Eldridge (64)	RS junior	Center

Defensive starters

Returning defensive starters
Player	Class	Position
Jarrius Wallace (3)	RS sophomore	Safety
Chacho Ulloa (20)	Junior	Safety
Finton Connolly (91)	RS junior	Defensive lineman
Colin Schooler (7)	Sophomore	Linebacker
Lorenzo Burns (2)	RS sophomore	Cornerback
Demetrius Flannigan-Fowles (6)	Senior	Safety
Jace Whittaker (17)	Senior	Cornerback
Dereck Boles (99)	RS senior	Defensive lineman

Special Teams starters

Returning special teams starters
Player	Class	Position
Josh Pollack (9)	RS senior	Placekicker
Lucas Havrisik (43)	Sophomore	Placekicker
Nick Reinhardt (56)	RS sophomore	Long snapper
Jake Glatting (16)	RS senior	Punter/holder

† Indicates player was a starter in 2017 but missed all of 2018 due to injury.

== Preseason ==
=== Award watch lists ===
Listed in the order that they were released

Award	Player	Position	Year
Lott Trophy	Colin Schooler	LB	SO
Rimington Trophy	Nathan Eldridge	C	JR
Maxwell Award	Khalil Tate	QB	JR
Davey O'Brien Award	Khalil Tate	QB	JR
Doak Walker Award	J. J. Taylor	RB	RS SO
John Mackey Award	Bryce Wolma	TE	SO
Wuerffel Trophy	Malcolm Holland	DB	JR
Paul Hornung Award	Shun Brown	WR	SR
Walter Camp Award	Khalil Tate	QB	JR
Johnny Unitas Golden Arm Award	Khalil Tate	QB	JR
Manning Award	Khalil Tate	QB	JR

=== Pac-12 media poll ===
The 2018 Pac-12 media days are set for July 25, 2018 in Hollywood, California. Kevin Sumlin (Head coach), Khalil Tate (QB) & Colin Schooler (ILB) at Pac-12 media days. The Pac-12 media poll was released with the Wildcats predicted to finish in third place at Pac-12 South division.

== Spring game ==
The 2018 Wildcats had spring practice on March 19, 2018. The 2018 Arizona football spring game will take place in Tucson, AZ on April 14, 2018, and time to be determined.

Date	Spring Game	Site	TV	Result
April 14, 2018	Offensive vs. Defense	Arizona Stadium • Tucson, AZ	P12N	Defense 55–46

2018 Arizona Spring Game

Team	1	2	3	4	Total
Offense	6	10	16	14	46
• Defense	3	39	7	6	55

- Location: Tucson, Arizona
- Television network: Pac-12

== Schedule ==
Arizona announced its 2018 football schedule on November 16, 2017. The 2018 Wildcats' schedule consists of 7 home and 4 away games for the regular season. Arizona will host nine Pac-12 conference opponents California, Colorado, Oregon, USC and arch-rival Arizona State for the 91st annual Territorial Cup to close out the regular season and will travel to UCLA, Utah, Oregon State and Washington State. Arizona is not scheduled to play Pac-12 North opponents Stanford and Washington in the 2018 regular season. The Wildcats bye week comes during week 11 on November 10.

Arizona's out of conference opponents represent the American and Big Sky conferences. The Wildcats will host two non–conference games which are against Southern Utah (first ever meeting) from the Big Sky and BYU (NCAA Division I FBS independent) and travel to Houston from the American.

Date	Time	Opponent	Site	TV	Result	Attendance
September 1	7:45 p.m.	BYU*	Arizona Stadium; Tucson, AZ	ESPN	L 23–28	51,002
September 8	9:00 a.m.	at Houston*	TDECU Stadium; Houston, TX	ABC/ESPN2	L 18–45	32,534
September 15	8:00 p.m.	Southern Utah*	Arizona Stadium; Tucson, AZ	P12N	W 62–31	41,493
September 22	2:00 p.m.	at Oregon State	Reser Stadium; Corvallis, OR	P12N	W 35–14	33,022
September 29	7:30 p.m.	USC	Arizona Stadium; Tucson, AZ	ESPN2	L 20–24	43,573
October 6	7:00 p.m.	California	Arizona Stadium; Tucson, AZ	FS1	W 24–17	44,253
October 12	7:00 p.m.	at Utah	Rice-Eccles Stadium; Salt Lake City, UT	ESPN	L 10–42	45,862
October 20	7:30 p.m.	at UCLA	Rose Bowl; Pasadena, CA	ESPN2	L 30–31	54,686
October 27	7:30 p.m.	No. 19 Oregon^{†}	Arizona Stadium; Tucson, AZ	ESPN	W 44–15	42,845
November 2	8:30 p.m.	Colorado	Arizona Stadium; Tucson, AZ	FS1	W 42–34	43,080
November 17	8:30 p.m.	at No. 8 Washington State	Martin Stadium; Pullman, WA	ESPN	L 28–69	22,400
November 24	1:30 p.m.	Arizona State	Arizona Stadium; Tucson, AZ (Territorial Cup)	FS1	L 40–41	51,805
*Non-conference game; ^{†}Homecoming; Rankings from AP Poll released prior to the game; All times are in Mountain time

== Game summaries ==
=== vs BYU ===
BYU Cougars (0–0) vs Arizona Wildcats (0–0) – Game summary

Quarter	1	2	3	4	Total
Cougars	0	7	21	0	28
Wildcats	0	10	0	13	23

at Arizona Stadium • Tucson, AZ

- Date: September 1, 2018
- Game time: 7:45 p.m.
- Game weather: Mostly clear, 88 °F (31 °C)
- Game attendance: 51,002
- Referee: Scott Campbell
- TV announcers (ESPN): Adam Amin (play-by-play), Rod Gilmore (analyst), Quint Kessenich (sideline reporter)

Game information

First quarter

- No scoring plays

Second quarter

- (9:58) BYU – Squally Canada 1-yard run, Skyler Southam kick (Drive: 9 plays, 59 yards, 4:38; BYU 7–0)
- (5:39) ARIZ – Lucas Havrisik 24-yard field goal (Drive: 12 plays, 71 yards, 4:13; BYU 7–3)
- (0:50) ARIZ – Tony Ellison 15-yard pass from Khalil Tate, Lucas Havrisik kick (Drive: 9 plays, 77 yards, 2:29; Arizona 10–7)

Third quarter

- (8:25) BYU – Matt Bushman 24-yard pass from Tanner Mangum, Skyler Southam kick (Drive: 10 plays, 75 yards, 6:35; BYU 14–10)
- (4:29) BYU – Squally Canada 1-yard run, Skyler Southam kick (Drive: 9 plays, 58 yards, 2:35; BYU 21–10)
- (1:07) BYU – Squally Canada 2-yard run, Skyler Southam kick (Drive: 5 plays, 36 yards, 2:14; BYU 28–10)

Fourth quarter

- (13:29) ARIZ – Khalil Tate 2-yard run, Lucas Havrisik kick (Drive: 9 plays, 75 yards, 2:31; BYU 28–17)
- (3:20) ARIZ – J.J. Taylor 1-yard run, two-point pass failed (Drive: 8 plays, 67 yards, 1:28; BYU 28–23)

Statistics	BYU	ARIZ
First downs	23	22
Total yards	392	326
Rushing yards	43–183	35–129
Passing yards	209	197
Passing: Comp–Att–Int	18–28–0	17–34–0
Time of possession	36:33	23:27

Team	Category	Player	Statistics
BYU	Passing	Tanner Mangum	18/28, 209 yards, TD
BYU	Rushing	Squally Canada	24 carries, 98 yards, 3 TD
BYU	Receiving	Aleva Hifo	2 receptions, 36 yards
Arizona	Passing	Khalil Tate	17/34, 197 yards, TD
Arizona	Rushing	J.J. Taylor	18 carries, 85 yards, TD
Arizona	Receiving	Shawn Poindexter	4 receptions, 68 yards

=== at Houston ===
Arizona Wildcats (0–1) at Houston Cougars (1–0) – Game summary

Quarter	1	2	3	4	Total
Wildcats	0	0	10	8	18
Cougars	21	10	7	7	45

at TDECU Stadium • Houston, TX

- Date: September 8, 2018
- Game time: 9:00 a.m.
- Game weather: Partly Cloudy, 86 °F (30 °C)
- Game attendance: 32,534
- Referee: Mike Roche
- TV announcers (ABC/ESPN2): Steve Levy (play-by-play), Todd McShay (analyst), Paul Carcaterra (sideline reporter)

Game information

First quarter

- (12:13) HOU – Marquez Stevenson 24-yard pass from D'Eriq King, Dalton Witherspoon kick (Drive: 10 plays, 81 yards, 2:47; Houston 7–0)
- (8:29) HOU – D'Eriq King 1-yard run, Dalton Witherspoon kick (Drive: 4 plays, 40 yards, 0:49; Houston 14–0)
- (4:43) HOU – Romello Brooker 52-yard pass from D'Eriq King, Dalton Witherspoon kick (Drive: 5 plays, 63 yards, 1:12; Houston 21–0)

Second quarter

- (12:38) HOU – Dalton Witherspoon 35-yard field goal (Drive: 12 plays, 47 yards, 2:52; Houston 24–0)
- (3:44) HOU – Bryson Smith 13-yard pass from D'Eriq King, Dalton Witherspoon kick (Drive: 9 plays, 75 yards, 1:53; Houston 31–0)

Third quarter

- (12:09) HOU – Keith Corbin 18-yard pass from D'Eriq King, Dalton Witherspoon kick (Drive: 6 plays, 64 yards, 1:35; Houston 38–0)
- (3:16) ARIZ – Lucas Havrisik 49-yard field goal (Drive: 9 plays, 49 yards, 3:05; Houston 38–3)
- (0:11) ARIZ – Darrius Smith 1-yard run, Lucas Havrisik kick (Drive: 6 plays, 74 yards, 1:47; Houston 38–10)

Fourth quarter

- (11:05) ARIZ – Khalil Tate 2-yard run, kick failed (Drive: 10 plays, 75 yards, 3:22; Houston 38–16)
- (6:35) ARIZ – Team safety (Houston 38–18)
- (1:48) HOU – D'Eriq King 4-yard run, Dalton Witherspoon kick (Drive: 6 plays, 95 yards, 3:17; Houston 45–18)

Statistics	ARIZ	HOU
First downs	31	28
Total yards	531	551
Rushing yards	50–150	40–297
Passing yards	381	254
Passing: Comp–Att–Int	28–50–2	19–40–0
Time of possession	35:21	24:39

Team	Category	Player	Statistics
Arizona	Passing	Khalil Tate	24/45, 341 yards, 2 INT
Arizona	Rushing	J.J. Taylor	18 carries, 54 yards
Arizona	Receiving	Shawn Poindexter	7 receptions, 134 yards
Houston	Passing	D'Eriq King	17/34, 246 yards, 4 TD
Houston	Rushing	Teren Williams	12 carries, 65 yards
Houston	Receiving	Romello Brooker	2 receptions, 76 yards, TD

=== vs Southern Utah ===
Southern Utah Thunderbirds (0–2) vs Arizona Wildcats (0–2) – Game summary

Quarter	1	2	3	4	Total
Thunderbirds	0	17	0	14	31
Wildcats	7	17	24	14	62

at Arizona Stadium • Tucson, AZ

- Date: September 15, 2018
- Game time: 8:00 p.m.
- Game weather: Clear, 101 °F (38 °C)
- Game attendance: 41,493
- Referee: Kevin Mar
- TV announcers (Pac-12 Network): JB Long (play-by-play), Jeremy Bloom (analyst), Samantha Peszek (sideline reporter)

Game information

First quarter

- (9:42) ARIZ – Tony Ellison 17-yard pass from Khalil Tate, Lucas Havrisik kick (Drive: 5 plays, 80 yards, 1:25; Arizona 7–0)

Second quarter

- (14:56) SUU – Manny Berz 33-yard field goal (Drive: 12 plays, 55 yards, 5:44; Arizona 7–3)
- (14:42) ARIZ – J.J. Taylor 84-yard kickoff return, Lucas Havrisik kick (Arizona 14–3)
- (9:27) SUU – Jay Green 10-yard run, Manny Berz kick (Drive: 13 plays, 75 yards, 5:15; Arizona 14–10)
- (7:41) ARIZ – Lucas Havrisik 32-yard field goal (Drive: 6 plays, 45 yards, 1:40; Arizona 17–10)
- (2:39) SUU – Chris Helbig 2-yard run, Manny Berz kick (Drive: 13 plays, 75 yards, 5:02; Tied 17–17)
- (0:23) ARIZ – Shun Brown 11-yard pass from Khalil Tate, Lucas Havrisik kick (Drive: 8 plays, 67 yards, 2:08; Arizona 24–17)

Third quarter

- (12:56) ARIZ – Cedric Peterson 2-yard pass from Khalil Tate, Lucas Havrisik kick (Drive: 5 plays, 67 yards, 1:55; Arizona 31–17)
- (10:17) ARIZ – Lucas Havrisik 35-yard field goal (Drive: 6 plays, 53 yards, 1:49; Arizona 34–17)
- (8:14) ARIZ – Shun Brown 65-yard pass from Khalil Tate, Lucas Havrisik kick (Drive: 3 plays, 66 yards, 0:53; Arizona 41–17)
- (1:47) ARIZ – Shawn Poindexter 75-yard pass from Khalil Tate, Lucas Havrisik kick (Drive: 4 plays, 98 yards, 1:42; Arizona 48–17)

Fourth quarter

- (12:33) SUU – Chris Helbig 2-yard run, Manny Berz kick (Drive: 14 plays, 75 yards, 4:14; Arizona 48–24)
- (9:50) ARIZ – Anthony Mariscal 33-yard run, Lucas Havrisik kick (Drive: 6 plays, 69 yards, 2:42; Arizona 55–24)
- (8:51) ARIZ – Brandon Leon 1-yard run, Lucas Havrisik kick (Drive: 3 plays, 21 yards, 0:50; Arizona 62–24)
- (4:57) SUU – Frank Harris 23-yard pass from Chris Helbig, Manny Berz kick (Drive: 10 plays, 75 yards, 3:54; Arizona 62–31)

Statistics	SUU	ARIZ
First downs	30	26
Total yards	463	626
Rushing yards	54–193	38–268
Passing yards	270	358
Passing: Comp–Att–Int	27–44–1	15–22–0
Time of possession	37:08	22:52

Team	Category	Player	Statistics
Southern Utah	Passing	Chris Helbig	27/44, 270 yards, TD, INT
Southern Utah	Rushing	Jay Green	15 carries, 78 yards, TD
Southern Utah	Receiving	Landon Measom	5 receptions, 74 yards
Arizona	Passing	Khalil Tate	13/20, 349 yards, 5 TD
Arizona	Rushing	Gary Brightwell	9 carries, 81 yards
Arizona	Receiving	Tony Ellison	4 receptions, 111 yards, TD

=== at Oregon State ===
Arizona Wildcats (1–2) at Oregon State Beavers (1–2) – Game summary

Quarter	1	2	3	4	Total
Wildcats	7	7	7	14	35
Beavers	7	0	0	7	14

at Reser Stadium • Corvallis, OR

- Date: September 22, 2018
- Game time: 2:00 p.m.
- Game weather: Cloudy, 65 °F (18 °C)
- Game attendance: 33,022
- Referee: Chris Coyte
- TV announcers (Pac-12 Network): Roxy Bernstein (play-by-play), Anthony Herron (analyst), Lewis Johnson (sideline reporter)

Game information

First quarter

- (12:37) ARIZ – J.J. Taylor 40-yard run, Lucas Havrisik kick (Drive: 5 plays, 58 yards, 1:18; Arizona 7–0)
- (0:56) OSU – Trevon Bradford 8-yard pass from Conor Blount, Jordan Choukair kick (Drive: 13 plays, 85 yards, 5:13; Tied 7–7)

Second quarter

- (8:25) ARIZ – Shun Brown 21-yard pass from Khalil Tate, Lucas Havrisik kick (Drive: 10 plays, 90 yards, 4:26; Arizona 14–7)

Third quarter

- (10:39) ARIZ – Shawn Poindexter 16-yard pass from Khalil Tate, Lucas Havrisik kick (Drive: 12 plays, 75 yards, 4:21; Arizona 21–7)

Fourth quarter

- (13:23) ARIZ – Gary Brightwell 8-yard run, Lucas Havrisik kick (Drive: 9 plays, 94 yards, 3:32; Arizona 28–7)
- (6:54) OSU – Timmy Hernandez 25-yard pass from Conor Blount, Jordan Choukair kick (Drive: 13 plays, 75 yards, 6:29; Arizona 28–14)
- (5:26) ARIZ – J.J. Taylor 62-yard run, Lucas Havrisik kick (Drive: 3 plays, 75 yards, 1:28; Arizona 35–14)

Statistics	ARIZ	OSU
First downs	29	18
Total yards	594	238
Rushing yards	51–442	44–97
Passing yards	152	141
Passing: Comp–Att–Int	9–17–0	18–26–0
Time of possession	27:05	32:55

Team	Category	Player	Statistics
Arizona	Passing	Khalil Tate	9/17, 152 yards, 2 TD
Arizona	Rushing	J.J. Taylor	27 carries, 284 yards, 2 TD
Arizona	Receiving	Shawn Poindexter	4 receptions, 92 yards, TD
Oregon State	Passing	Conor Blount	17/24, 137 yards, 2 TD
Oregon State	Rushing	Jermar Jefferson	19 carries, 82 yards
Oregon State	Receiving	Timmy Hernandez	4 receptions, 51 yards, TD

=== vs USC ===
USC Trojans (2–2) vs Arizona Wildcats (2–2) – Game summary

Quarter	1	2	3	4	Total
Trojans	7	10	7	0	24
Wildcats	0	0	7	13	20

at Arizona Stadium • Tucson, AZ

- Date: September 29, 2018
- Game time: 7:30 p.m.
- Game weather: Clear, 90 °F (32 °C)
- Game attendance: 43,573
- Referee: Steve Strimling
- TV announcers (ESPN2): Adam Amin (play-by-play), Rod Gilmore (analyst), Quint Kessenich (sideline reporter)

Game information

First quarter

- (5:52) USC – Vavae Malepeai 1-yard run, Michael Brown kick (Drive: 12 plays, 90 yards, 4:40; USC 7–0)

Second quarter

- (11:12) USC – Michael Brown 42-yard field goal (Drive: 4 plays, 8 yards, 2:20; USC 10–0)
- (5:08) USC – Aca'Cedric Ware 26-yard run, Michael Brown kick (Drive: 8 plays, 65 yards, 5:12; USC 17–0)

Third quarter

- (10:36) USC – Aca'Cedric Ware 69-yard run, Michael Brown kick (Drive: 4 plays, 92 yards, 2:06; USC 24–0)
- (7:44) ARIZ – Stanley Berryhill III 33-yard pass from Khalil Tate, Lucas Havrisik kick (Drive: 7 plays, 84 yards, 2:45; USC 24–7)

Fourth quarter

- (9:34) ARIZ – Cedric Peterson 32-yard pass from Khalil Tate, Lucas Havrisik kick (Drive: 1 play, 32 yards, 0:08; USC 24–14)
- (1:40) ARIZ – Gary Brightwell 1-yard run, kick failed (Drive: 8 plays, 65 yards, 2:23; USC 24–20)

Statistics	USC	ARIZ
First downs	18	20
Total yards	450	330
Rushing yards	47–253	37–98
Passing yards	197	232
Passing: Comp–Att–Int	16–24–0	16–33–1
Time of possession	32:51	27:09

Team	Category	Player	Statistics
USC	Passing	JT Daniels	16/24, 197 yards
USC	Rushing	Aca'Cedric Ware	21 carries, 173 yards. 2 TD
USC	Receiving	Amon-Ra St. Brown	5 receptions, 54 yards
Arizona	Passing	Khalil Tate	16/33, 232 yards, 2 TD, INT
Arizona	Rushing	J.J. Taylor	18 carries, 50 yards
Arizona	Receiving	Shun Brown	5 receptions, 81 yards

=== vs California ===
California Golden Bears (2–2) vs Arizona Wildcats (2–3) – Game summary

Quarter	1	2	3	4	Total
Golden Bears	0	14	0	3	17
Wildcats	10	0	7	7	24

at Arizona Stadium • Tucson, AZ

- Date: October 6, 2018
- Game time: 7:00 p.m.
- Game weather: Clear and dark, 83 °F (28 °C)
- Game attendance: 44,253
- Referee: Mark Duddy
- TV announcers (FS1): Justin Kutcher (play-by-play), DeMarco Murray (analyst), Petros Papadakis (sideline reporter)

Game information

First quarter

- (9:42) ARIZ – Tony Ellison 31-yard pass from Khalil Tate, Josh Pollack kick (Drive: 11 plays, 75 yards, 5:18; Arizona 7–0)
- (1:49) ARIZ – Josh Pollack 46-yard field goal (Drive: 9 plays, 36 yards, 3:25; Arizona 10–0)

Second quarter

- (14:02) CAL – Brandon McIlwain 25-yard run, Greg Thomas kick (Drive: 7 plays, 75 yards, 2:47; Arizona 10–7)
- (0:41) CAL – Brandon McIlwain 23-yard run, Greg Thomas kick (Drive: 7 plays, 75 yards, 2:13; California 14–10)

Third quarter

- (3:19) ARIZ – Azizi Hearn 34-yard interception return, Josh Pollack kick (Arizona 17–14)

Fourth quarter

- (3:13) ARIZ – Scottie Young Jr. 24-yard interception return, Josh Pollack kick (Arizona 24–14)
- (0:16) CAL – Greg Thomas 35-yard field goal (Drive: 10 plays, 57 yards, 2:57; Arizona 24–17)

Statistics	CAL	ARIZ
First downs	25	13
Total yards	476	265
Rushing yards	34–161	34–124
Passing yards	315	141
Passing: Comp–Att–Int	32–43–3	15–25–1
Time of possession	34:40	25:20

Team	Category	Player	Statistics
California	Passing	Brandon McIlwain	32/43, 315 yards, 3 INT
California	Rushing	Brandon McIlwain	20 carries, 107 yards, 2 TD
California	Receiving	Moe Ways	8 receptions, 97 yards
Arizona	Passing	Khalil Tate	15/25, 141 yards, TD, INT
Arizona	Rushing	J.J. Taylor	15 carries, 73 yards
Arizona	Receiving	Tony Ellison	3 receptions, 41 yards, TD

=== at Utah ===
Arizona Wildcats (3–3) at Utah Utes (3–2) – Game summary

Quarter	1	2	3	4	Total
Wildcats	0	0	3	7	10
Utes	14	14	7	7	42

at Rice-Eccles Stadium • Salt Lake City, UT

- Date: October 12, 2018
- Game time: 4:00 p.m.
- Game weather: Clear, 48 °F (9 °C)
- Game attendance: 37,525
- Referee: Jay Edwards
- TV announcers (ESPN): Bob Wischusen (play by play), Brock Huard (analyst), Allison Williams (sideline reporter)

Game information

First quarter

- (7:47) UTAH – Samson Nacua 8-yard pass from Tyler Huntley, Matt Gay kick (Drive: 15 plays, 75 yards, 7:13; Utah 7–0)
- (2:47) UTAH – Zack Moss 1-yard run, Matt Gay kick (Drive: 8 plays, 69 yards, 3:23; Utah 14–0)

Second quarter

- (10:39) UTAH – Demari Simpkins 68-yard pass from Tyler Huntley, Matt Gay kick (Drive: 3 plays, 83 yards, 1:07; Utah 21–0)
- (1:56) UTAH – Tyler Huntley 3-yard run, Matt Gay kick (Drive: 9 plays, 58 yards, 4:34; Utah 28–0)

Third quarter

- (13:12) UTAH – Tyler Huntley 58-yard pass from Britain Covey, Matt Gay kick (Drive: 2 plays, 67 yards, 0:42; Utah 35–0)
- (9:16) ARIZ – Josh Pollack 37-yard field goal (Drive: 11 plays, 56 yards, 3:56; Utah 35–3)

Fourth quarter

- (13:23) ARIZ – Cedric Peterson 42-yard pass from Rhett Rodriguez, Josh Pollack kick (Drive: 7 plays, 93 yards, 1:50; Utah 35–10)
- (6:14) UTAH – Armand Shyne 22-yard run, Matt Gay kick (Drive: 5 plays, 68 yards, 1:57; Utah 42–10)

Statistics	ARIZ	UTAH
First downs	19	23
Total yards	318	495
Rushing yards	31–72	46–230
Passing yards	246	265
Passing: Comp–Att–Int	24–46–0	16–22–1
Time of possession	26:50	33:10

Team	Category	Player	Statistics
Arizona	Passing	Rhett Rodriguez	20/38, 226 yards, TD
Arizona	Rushing	J.J. Taylor	14 carries, 63 yards
Arizona	Receiving	Cedric Peterson	4 receptions, 63 yards, TD
Utah	Passing	Tyler Huntley	14/19, 201 yards, 2 TD, INT
Utah	Rushing	Zack Moss	15 carries, 68 yards, TD
Utah	Receiving	Demari Simpkins	3 receptions, 78 yards, TD

=== at UCLA ===
Arizona Wildcats (3–4) at UCLA Bruins (2–4) – Game summary

Quarter	1	2	3	4	Total
Wildcats	0	7	13	10	30
Bruins	7	10	7	7	31

at Rose Bowl • Pasadena, CA

- Date: October 20, 2018
- Game time: 7:30 p.m.
- Game weather: Clear, 76 °F (24 °C)
- Game attendance: 54,686
- Referee: Jay Edwards
- TV announcers (ESPN2): Roy Philpott (play-by-play), Tom Ramsey (analyst), Ed Aschoff (sideline reporter)

Game information

First quarter

- (9:51) UCLA – Kazmeir Allen 16-yard pass from Dorian Thompson-Robinson, JJ Molson kick (Drive: 9 plays, 62 yards, 4:11; UCLA 7–0)

Second quarter

- (14:56) UCLA – JJ Molson 40-yard field goal (Drive: 7 plays, 53 yards, 3:22; UCLA 10–0)
- (6:38) ARIZ – Shawn Poindexter 13-yard pass from Rhett Rodriguez, Josh Pollack kick (Drive: 5 plays, 71 yards, 2:00; UCLA 10–7)
- (1:34) UCLA – Devin Asiasi 24-yard pass from Wilton Speight, JJ Molson kick (Drive: 13 plays, 75 yards, 5:04; UCLA 17–7)

Third quarter

- (10:16) ARIZ – Josh Pollack 29-yard field goal (Drive: 9 plays, 71 yards, 3:09; UCLA 17–10)
- (8:54) ARIZ – Shawn Poindexter 11-yard pass from Rhett Rodriguez, Josh Pollack kick (Drive: 3 plays, 15 yards, 1:14; Tied 17–17)
- (4:58) ARIZ – Josh Pollack 39-yard field goal (Drive: 5 plays, 66 yards, 1:53; Arizona 20–17)
- (3:08) UCLA – Demetric Felton 25-yard pass from Wilton Speight, JJ Molson kick (Drive: 6 plays, 75 yards, 1:50; UCLA 24–20)

Fourth quarter

- (12:34) ARIZ – J.J. Taylor 1-yard run, Josh Pollack kick (Drive: 8 plays, 72 yards, 2:47; Arizona 27–24)
- (11:33) UCLA – Joshua Kelley 28-yard run, JJ Molson kick (Drive: 4 plays, 75 yards, 1:01; UCLA 31–27)
- (6:28) ARIZ – Josh Pollack 29-yard field goal (Drive: 11 plays, 63 yards, 5:00; UCLA 31–30)

Statistics	ARIZ	UCLA
First downs	22	23
Total yards	520	460
Rushing yards	38–289	47–153
Passing yards	231	307
Passing: Comp–Att–Int	15–34–2	22–35–0
Time of possession	27:18	32:42

Team	Category	Player	Statistics
Arizona	Passing	Rhett Rodriguez	15/34, 231 yards, 2 TD, 2 INT
Arizona	Rushing	J.J. Taylor	19 carries, 154 yards, TD
Arizona	Receiving	Shawn Poindexter	6 receptions, 106 yards, 2 TD
UCLA	Passing	Wilton Speight	17/27, 204 yards, 2 TD
UCLA	Rushing	Joshua Kelley	31 carries, 136 yards, TD
UCLA	Receiving	Theo Howard	3 receptions, 84 yards

=== vs No. 19 Oregon ===
No. 19 Oregon Ducks (5–2) vs Arizona Wildcats (3–5) – Game summary

Quarter	1	2	3	4	Total
#19 Ducks	0	8	0	7	15
Wildcats	10	13	14	7	44

at Arizona Stadium • Tucson, AZ

- Date: October 27, 2018
- Game time: 7:30 p.m.
- Game weather: Clear, 74 °F (23 °C)
- Game attendance: 42,845
- Referee: Michael Mothershed
- TV announcers (ESPN): Clay Matvick (play-by-play), Dan Orlovsky (analyst), Paul Carcaterra (sideline reporter)

Game information

First quarter

- (11:08) ARIZ – Shawn Poindexter 22-yard pass from Khalil Tate, Josh Pollack kick (Drive: 7 plays, 75 yards, 2:03; Arizona 7–0)
- (4:52) ARIZ – Josh Pollack 34-yard field goal (Drive: 4 plays, 5 yards, 0:41; Arizona 10–0)

Second quarter

- (12:43) ARIZ – Josh Pollack 32-yard field goal (Drive: 8 plays, 37 yards, 3:19; Arizona 13–0)
- (11:30) ARIZ – Josh Pollack 23-yard field goal (Drive: 4 plays, 1 yard, 0:49; Arizona 16–0)
- (9:17) ORE – Dillon Mitchell 29-yard pass from Justin Herbert, Justin Herbert run for two-point conversion (Drive: 7 plays, 75 yards, 2:13; Arizona 16–8)
- (1:39) ARIZ – J.J. Taylor 1-yard run, Josh Pollack kick (Drive: 18 plays, 88 yards, 7:30; Arizona 23–8)

Third quarter

- (10:30) ARIZ – Shawn Poindexter 8-yard pass from Khalil Tate, Josh Pollack kick (Drive: 7 plays, 96 yards, 3:22; Arizona 30–8)
- (2:49) ARIZ – Shun Brown 27-yard pass from Khalil Tate, Josh Pollack kick (Drive: 5 plays, 52 yards, 1:54; Arizona 37–8)

Fourth quarter

- (9:17) ORE – Brendan Schooler 7-yard pass from Justin Herbert, Adam Stack kick (Drive: 14 plays, 74 yards, 4:57; Arizona 37–15)
- (3:32) ARIZ – J.J. Taylor 19-yard run, Josh Pollack kick (Drive: 10 plays, 75 yards, 5:45; Arizona 44–15)

Statistics	ORE	ARIZ
First downs	18	27
Total yards	270	465
Rushing yards	23–84	51–276
Passing yards	186	189
Passing: Comp–Att–Int	24–48–1	19–33–1
Time of possession	23:51	36:09

Team	Category	Player	Statistics
Oregon	Passing	Justin Herbert	24/48, 186 yards, 2 TD, INT
Oregon	Rushing	Justin Herbert	6 carries, 31 yards
Oregon	Receiving	Dillon Mitchell	6 receptions, 69 yards, TD
Arizona	Passing	Khalil Tate	19/33, 189 yards, 3 TD, INT
Arizona	Rushing	J.J. Taylor	30 carries, 212 yards, 2 TD
Arizona	Receiving	Shun Brown	10 receptions, 96 yards, TD

=== vs Colorado ===
Colorado Buffaloes (5–3) vs Arizona Wildcats (4–5) – Game summary

Quarter	1	2	3	4	Total
Buffaloes	10	14	10	0	34
Wildcats	0	26	9	7	42

at Arizona Stadium • Tucson, AZ

- Date: November 2, 2018
- Game time: 8:30 p.m.
- Game weather: Clear, 65 °F (18 °C)
- Game attendance: 43,080
- Referee: Matthew Richards
- TV announcers (FS1): Brian Custer (play-by-play), Ben Leber (analyst), Jennifer Hale (sideline reporter)

Game information

First quarter

- (5:35) COLO – K.D. Nixon 8-yard run, Tyler Francis kick (Drive: 11 plays, 66 yards, 4:19; Colorado 7–0)
- (3:56) COLO – Tyler Francis 25-yard field goal (Drive: 4 plays, -1 yard, 1:26; Colorado 10–0)

Second quarter

- (14:33) ARIZ – Lucas Havrisik 49-yard field goal (Drive: 11 plays, 44 yards, 4:22; Colorado 10–3)
- (10:33) ARIZ – Stanley Berryhill III 40-yard pass from Khalil Tate, Josh Pollack kick (Drive: 4 plays, 62 yards, 1:29; Tied 10–10)
- (6:15) ARIZ – Shawn Poindexter 1-yard pass from Khalil Tate, Josh Pollack kick (Drive: 8 plays, 82 yards, 2:43; Arizona 17–10)
- (2:50) COLO – Kyle Evans 17-yard pass from Steven Montez, Tyler Francis kick (Drive: 9 plays, 89 yards, 3:20; Tied 17–17)
- (0:59) ARIZ – Shun Brown 12-yard pass from Khalil Tate, kick failed (Drive: 6 plays, 75 yards, 1:51; Arizona 23–17)
- (0:33) COLO – Travon McMillan 57-yard pass from Steven Montez, Tyler Francis kick (Drive: 3 plays, 75 yards, 0:26; Colorado 24–23)
- (0:00) ARIZ – Lucas Havrisik 55-yard field goal (Drive: 4 plays, 21 yards, 0:25; Arizona 26–24)

Third quarter

- (9:26) COLO – Tony Brown 20-yard pass from Steven Montez, Tyler Francis kick (Drive: 11 plays, 75 yards, 5:34; Colorado 31–26)
- (7:11) ARIZ – Shawn Poindexter 39-yard pass from Khalil Tate, two-point pass failed (Drive: 5 plays, 66 yards, 2:07; Arizona 32–31)
- (2:39) ARIZ – Josh Pollack 41-yard field goal (Drive: 9 plays, 62 yards, 3:34; Arizona 35–31)
- (0:00) COLO – Tyler Francis 48-yard field goal (Drive: 7 plays, 44 yards, 2:39; Arizona 35–34)

Fourth quarter

- (13:04) ARIZ – Cedric Peterson 57-yard pass from Khalil Tate, Josh Pollack kick (Drive: 4 plays, 85 yards, 1:56; Arizona 42–34)

Statistics	COLO	ARIZ
First downs	27	27
Total yards	383	566
Rushing yards	32–40	47–216
Passing yards	343	350
Passing: Comp–Att–Int	27–43–1	17–22–1
Time of possession	30:56	29:04

Team	Category	Player	Statistics
Colorado	Passing	Steven Montez	27/42, 343 yards, 3 TD, INT
Colorado	Rushing	Travon McMillan	11 carries, 59 yards
Colorado	Receiving	Juwann Winfree	8 receptions, 101 yards
Arizona	Passing	Khalil Tate	17/22, 350 yards, 5 TD, INT
Arizona	Rushing	J.J. Taylor	40 carries, 192 yards
Arizona	Receiving	Cedric Peterson	2 receptions, 72 yards, TD

=== at No. 8 Washington State ===
Arizona Wildcats (5–5) at No. 8 Washington State Cougars (9–1) – Game summary

Quarter	1	2	3	4	Total
Wildcats	7	7	14	0	28
#8 Cougars	21	34	0	14	69

at Martin Stadium • Pullman, WA

- Date: November 17, 2018
- Game time: 8:30 p.m.
- Game weather: Clear, 29 °F (−2 °C)
- Game attendance: 22,400
- Referee: Mike McCabe
- TV announcers (ESPN): Bob Wischusen (play by play), Brock Huard (analyst), Allison Williams (sideline reporter)

Game information

First quarter

- (10:44) WSU – James Williams 1-yard run, Blake Mazza kick (Drive: 9 plays, 75 yards, 4:16; Washington State 7–0)
- (7:38) WSU – Max Borghi 1-yard run, Blake Mazza kick (Drive: 6 plays, 53 yards, 1:48; Washington State 14–0)
- (3:19) ARIZ – Shawn Poindexter 24-yard pass from Khalil Tate, Lucas Havrisik kick (Drive: 6 plays, 70 yards, 1:59; Washington State 14–7)
- (0:19) WSU – Calvin Jackson 27-yard pass from Gardner Minshew, Blake Mazza kick (Drive: 6 plays, 49 yards, 2:52; Washington State 21–7)

Second quarter

- (12:03) WSU – Dezmon Patton 11-yard pass from Gardner Minshew, Blake Mazza kick (Drive: 5 plays, 79 yards, 2:06; Washington State 28–7)
- (10:43) ARIZ – Tony Ellison 37-yard pass from Khalil Tate, Lucas Havrisik kick (Drive: 4 plays, 73 yards, 1:16; Washington State 28–14)
- (7:08) WSU – Calvin Jackson 6-yard pass from Gardner Minshew, two-point run failed (Drive: 7 plays, 75 yards, 3:39; Washington State 34–14)
- (7:04) WSU – Kainoa Wilson 0-yard fumble return, Blake Mazza kick (Washington State 41–14)
- (3:22) WSU – James Williams 9-yard pass from Gardner Minshew, Blake Mazza kick (Drive: 6 plays, 54 yards, 2:32; Washington State 48–14)
- (0:10) WSU – Tay Martin 50-yard pass from Gardner Minshew, Blake Mazza kick (Drive: 2 plays, 80 yards, 0:30; Washington State 55–14)

Third quarter

- (12:18) ARIZ – Shun Brown 2-yard pass from Khalil Tate, Lucas Havrisik kick (Drive: 8 plays, 75 yards, 2:42; Washington State 55–21)
- (1:02) ARIZ – Shawn Poindexter 14-yard pass from Khalil Tate, Lucas Havrisik kick (Drive: 11 plays, 80 yards, 3:52; Washington State 55–28)

Fourth quarter

- (12:37) WSU – Jamire Calvin 2-yard pass from Gardner Minshew, Blake Mazza kick (Drive: 5 plays, 22 yards, 2:06; Washington State 62–28)
- (7:06) WSU – Easop Winston 9-yard pass from Gardner Minshew, Blake Mazza kick (Drive: 7 plays, 75 yards, 3:02; Washington State 69–28)

Statistics	ARIZ	WSU
First downs	21	31
Total yards	431	605
Rushing yards	37–127	23–123
Passing yards	304	482
Passing: Comp–Att–Int	20–34–1	44–56–0
Time of possession	26:19	33:41

Team	Category	Player	Statistics
Arizona	Passing	Khalil Tate	18/30, 294 yards, 4 TD, INT
Arizona	Rushing	J.J. Taylor	20 carries, 69 yards
Arizona	Receiving	Devaughn Cooper	3 receptions, 97 yards
Washington State	Passing	Gardner Minshew	43/55, 473 yards, 7 TD
Washington State	Rushing	Max Borghi	8 carries, 50 yards, TD
Washington State	Receiving	Tay Martin	7 receptions, 124 yards, TD

=== vs Arizona State ===
Arizona State Sun Devils (6–5) vs Arizona Wildcats (5–6) – Game summary

Quarter	1	2	3	4	Total
Sun Devils	7	7	7	20	41
Wildcats	10	12	18	0	40

at Arizona Stadium • Tucson, AZ

- Date: November 24, 2018
- Game time: 1:30 p.m.
- Game weather: Clear, 69 °F (21 °C)
- Game attendance: 51,805
- Referee: Chris Coyte
- TV announcers (FS1): Chris Vosters (play-by-play), Petros Papadakis (analyst)

Game information

First quarter

- (7:06) ARIZ – Josh Pollack 29-yard field goal (Drive: 9 plays, 86 yards, 3:47; Arizona 3–0)
- (3:33) ARIZ – Tony Ellison 28-yard pass from Khalil Tate, Josh Pollack kick (Drive: 6 plays, 78 yards, 1:45; Arizona 10–0)
- (2:28) ASU – Brandon Aiyuk 58-yard pass from Manny Wilkins, Brandon Ruiz kick (Drive: 3 plays, 75 yards, 1:05; Arizona 10–7)

Second quarter

- (10:18) ARIZ – Josh Pollack 23-yard field goal (Drive: 5 plays, 21 yards, 2:21; Arizona 13–7)
- (4:25) ARIZ – Shawn Poindexter 23-yard pass from Khalil Tate, two-point run failed (Drive: 9 plays, 70 yards, 4:13; Arizona 19–7)
- (1:27) ASU – Eno Benjamin 10-yard run, Brandon Ruiz kick (Drive: 9 plays, 75 yards, 2:58; Arizona 19–14)
- (0:00) ARIZ – Josh Pollack 36-yard field goal (Drive: 6 plays, 44 yards, 1:18; Arizona 22–14)

Third quarter

- (13:14) ARIZ – Team safety (Arizona 24–14)
- (12:17) ARIZ – Josh Pollack 40-yard field goal (Drive: 4 plays, 3 yards, 0:46; Arizona 27–14)
- (9:23) ASU – Eno Benjamin 14-yard run, Brandon Ruiz kick (Drive: 5 plays, 65 yards, 2:54; Arizona 27–21)
- (7:51) ARIZ – Gary Brightwell 35-yard run, two-point pass failed (Drive: 4 plays, 75 yards, 1:32; Arizona 33–21)
- (2:44) ARIZ – Tony Ellison 8-yard pass from Khalil Tate, Josh Pollack kick (Drive: 9 plays, 58 yards, 3:26; Arizona 40–21)

Fourth quarter

- (13:05) ASU – Brandon Ruiz 27-yard field goal (Drive: 12 plays, 66 yards, 4:39; Arizona 40–24)
- (6:36) ASU – Manny Wilkins 11-yard run, Manny Wilkins two-point pass to Tommy Hudson (Drive: 8 plays, 80 yards, 2:25; Arizona 40–32)
- (3:33) ASU – Brandon Ruiz 39-yard field goal (Drive: 4 plays, 1 yard, 1:26; Arizona 40–35)
- (3:08) ASU – Eno Benjamin 22-yard run, two-point pass failed (Drive: 1 play, 22 yards, 0:07; Arizona State 41–40)

Statistics	ASU	ARIZ
First downs	20	26
Total yards	401	520
Rushing yards	31–136	44–238
Passing yards	265	282
Passing: Comp–Att–Int	18–31–0	21–39–1
Time of possession	27:43	32:17

Team	Category	Player	Statistics
Arizona State	Passing	Manny Wilkins	18/31, 265 yards, TD
Arizona State	Rushing	Eno Benjamin	21 carries, 80 yards, 3 TD
Arizona State	Receiving	Brandon Aiyuk	5 receptions, 106 yards, TD
Arizona	Passing	Khalil Tate	21/39, 282 yards, 3 TD, INT
Arizona	Rushing	J.J. Taylor	28 carries, 144 yards
Arizona	Receiving	Shawn Poindexter	6 receptions, 99 yards, TD

This game featured one of the most biggest comebacks/collapses in Arizona football history. The Wildcats, needing a win to become bowl-eligible, dominated ASU for the first three quarters to lead 40–21 going into the fourth. However, Arizona, feeling like the game was over due to their 19-point lead, began to play conservatively by draining the clock, which led to being prone to turnovers, which seemed to motivate Arizona State. The Devils capitalized on the Wildcats’ errors and scored 20 points to take the lead with over three minutes left. The Wildcats drove down the field in the final minute to possibly regain but missed a field goal attempt and the Territorial Cup remained in the Phoenix area for another year. The Wildcats ended the season with a record of 5–7 (4–5 in Pac-12 play).

Many fans blamed Sumlin and the coaching staff for the loss by calling more running plays than passing ones in the final quarter. Sumlin said that the team wanted to run the ball more to drain more time to keep the lead, but that doing so would lead to mistakes. He also believed that the loss affected the program, particularly in recruiting, which led to mixed results on the field and a period of futility, in which it became a factor in Sumlin's firing after the 2020 season.

== Personnel ==
=== Roster ===
2018 Arizona Wildcats Football
Quarterbacks: 4 Rhett Rodriguez – sophomore (6'0, 186); 10 Jamarye Joiner – freshman (6'1, 210); 11 K’Hari Lane – (redshirt) freshman (6'1, 245); 12 Kevin Doyle – freshman (6'3, 210); 13 Luke Ashworth – freshman (6'0, 197); 14 Khalil Tate – junior (6'2, 215); 17 Andrew Tovar – (redshirt) freshman (6'2, 169); Running backs: 20 Darrius Smith – freshman (5'9, 175); 21 J. J. Taylor – (redshirt) sophomore (5'6, 180); 23 Gary Brightwell – sophomore (6'1, 196); 25 Anthony Mariscal – (redshirt) junior (5'10, 197); 28 Nazar Bombata – freshman (5'11, 195); 33 Nathan Tilford – sophomore (6'2, 206); 38 Brandon Leon – (redshirt) junior (5'8, 201); Wide receiver: 1 Drew Dixon – (redshirt) freshman (6'3, 203); 5 Brian Casteel – sophomore (6'0, 214); 6 Shun Brown – senior (5'9, 177) (KR/PR+); 7 DeVaughn Cooper – (redshirt) sophomore (5’10, 175); 9 Tony Ellison – (redshirt) senior (5'11, 188) (PR+); 16 William Gunnell – freshman (5'9, 187); 18 Cedric Peterson – (redshirt) junior (5'11, 188) (KR+); 19 Shawn Poindexter – (redshirt) senior (6'5, 212); 32 Terrence Johnson – (redshirt) junior (6'2, 211); 40 Thomas Reid III – (redshirt) freshman (6'2, 202); 83 Jailen Bailey – freshman (5'10, 163); 84 Thomas Marcus – freshman (6'2, 203); 86 Stanley Berryhill – (redshirt) freshman (5'9, 169); 87 Joshua Szott – freshman (6'2, 182); 88 Tre Adams – freshman (6'3, 190); 89 Brice Vooletich – freshman (5'10, 194); Tight end: 80 Zach Peters – freshman (6'4, 222); 81 Bryce Wolma – sophomore (6'3, 239); 82 Zach Williams – freshman (6'3, 224); 85 Jamie Nunley – (redshirt) sophomore (6'5, 230); Punter: 16 Jake Glatting – (redshirt) senior (6'3, 218) (H+); 26 Matt Aragon – (redshirt) junior (6'5, 211) (WR+); 42 Dylan Klumph - GS Senior (6'3, 230) (H+)	Offensive Lineman: 50 Josh McCauley – (redshirt) sophomore (6'3, 292) (C+); 53 Jon Jacobs – (redshirt) sophomore (6'4, 300) (OG+); 54 Bryson Cain – (redshirt) sophomore (6'4, 291) (OT+); 58 Layth Friekh – (redshirt) senior (6'5, 300) (OT+); 63 Steven Bailey – junior (6'3, 318) (C+); 64 Nathan Elridge – (redshirt) junior (6'7, 297) (C+); 66 Robert Congel – (redshirt) freshman (6'3, 315) (OL+); 67 David Watson – freshman (6'3, 307) (OG+); 70 Thiyo Lukusa – (redshirt) sophomore (6'5, 330) (OG+); 72 Edgar Burrola – (redshirt) freshman (6'5, 293) (OG+); 73 Tyrell Aponte – (redshirt) freshman (6'4, 263) (OL+); 75 Michael Eletise – (redshirt) sophomore (6'3, 318) (OT+); 74 Alex Kosinski – (redshirt) junior (6'4, 299) (OG+); 76 Cody Creason – (redshirt) junior (6'4, 294) (OT+); 78 Donovan Laie – freshman (6'4, 318) (OT+); 79 Tyson Gardner – (redshirt) freshman (6'3, 277) (OL+); Defensive lineman: 12 JB Brown – sophomore (6'3, 244) (DE+); 44 Kurtis Brown – sophomore (6'1, 185) (DT+); 52 P. J. Johnson – (redshirt) junior (6'4, 335) (DT+); 58 Nahe Sulunga – freshman (6'2, 270) (DT+); 59 My-King Johnson – (redshirt) freshman (DE+); 60 Mykee Irving – freshman (6'3, 337) (DL+); 71 Abraham Maiava – (redshirt) junior (6'2, 295) (DL+); 81 Jalen Cochran – (redshirt) sophomore (6'3, 249) (DE+); 86 Justin Belknap – (redshirt) junior (DE+); 90 Matt Thomas – (redshirt) junior (6'1, 274) (DT+); 91 Finton Connolly – (redshirt) junior (6'5, 275) (DT+); 94 Sione Taufahema – (redshirt) junior (6'1, 330) (DT+); 99 Dereck Boles – (redshirt) senior (6'2, 296) (DT+); Linebackers: 1 Tony Fields II – sophomore (6'1, 225); 7 Colin Schooler – sophomore (6'0, 226); 14 Kylan Wilborn – sophomore (6'2, 245); 26 Anthony Pandy – sophomore (6'0, 225); 34 Jacob Colacion – (redshirt) sophomore (6'1, 218); 45 Issaiah Johnson – freshman (6'1, 235); 47 Rourke Freeburg – (redshirt) freshman (6'2, 200); 48 Parker Henley – (redshirt) freshman (5'11, 222); 49 Jalen Harris – (redshirt) freshman (6'4, 212); 50 Ken Samson – (redshirt) freshman (6'1, 212); 51 Lee Anderson III – junior (6'1, 235); 53 Richard Merritt – (redshirt) freshman (6'0, 216); 56 Rexx Tessler – (redshirt) freshman (5'9, 209); 82 Dante Blissit – junior (6'0, 242); Placekicker: 30 Josh Pollack – (redshirt) senior (5'10, 174); 43 Lucas Havrisik – sophomore (6'2, 173)	Defensive backs: 2 Lorenzo Burns – (redshirt) sophomore (5'10, 173) (CB+); 3 Jarrius Wallace – (redshirt) sophomore (6'1, 180) (S+); 4 Antonio Parks – (redshirt) sophomore (5'10, 188) (CB+); 5 Christian Young – freshman (6'1, 209) (S+); 6 Demetrius Flannigan-Fowles – senior (6'2, 205) (S+); 8 Tim Hough – graduate (5'11, 195) (CB+); 9 Dayven Coleman – freshman (6'2, 216) (S+); 10 Malcolm Holland – (redshirt) sophomore (6'1, 185) (CB+); 11 Troy Young – sophomore (6'0, 205) (S+); 13 Chacho Ulloa – junior (5'11, 192) (S+); 15 McKenzie Barnes – freshman (6'1, 178) (CB+); 17 Jace Whittaker – senior (5'11, 182) (CB+); 19 Scottie Young Jr. – sophomore (5'11, 195) (S+); 20 Azizi Hearn – (redshirt) freshman (6'1, 187) (CB+); 21 Isaiah Hayes –Junior (6'0, 191) (S+); 23 Malik Hausman – (redshirt) freshman (6'0, 170) (CB+); 24 Rhedi Short – (redshirt) freshman (6'0, 184) (S+); 27 Sammy Morrison – (redshirt) junior (5'10, 177); 29 Jacorey Jones – freshman (5'11, 155); 31 Tristan Cooper – junior (6'1, 188) (S+); 33 Blake Pfaff – (redshirt) freshman (5'11, 182) (S+); 36 Chandler Gumbs – (redshirt) junior (6'1, 207) (S+); 37 Xavier Bell – (redshirt) freshman (6'2, 192) (S+); 46 Jimmy Banjoko-Wangjobe – freshman (6'0, 212) (CB+); 47 Rourke Freeburg – (redshirt) freshman (6'2, 200) (S+); Long snapper: 51 Donald Reiter – (redshirt) sophomore (5'10, 235); 56 Nick Reinhardt – (redshirt) junior (6'1, 240); 66 Geno Albini – freshman (5'11 213)
Source and player details:

=== Coaching staff ===
Arizona's coaching staff has finalized as of February 22, 2018.

Name	Position	Consecutive season at Arizona in current position
Kevin Sumlin	Head coach	1st year
Clarence McKinney	Assistant coach/running backs coach	1st year
Noel Mazzone	Offensive coordinator and quarterbacks coach	1st year
Taylor Mazzone	Assistant coach/outside wide receivers coach	1st year
Iona Uiagalelei	Assistant coach/Defensive lineman coach	1st year
Demetrice Martin	Assistant coach/cornerbacks coach	1st year
Marcel Yates	Defensive coordinator and linebackers coach	3rd year
Jeremy Springer	Tight ends coach and special teams coordinator	1st year
Theron Aych	Assistant coach/inside wide receiverss coach and passing game coordinator	2nd year
John Rushing	Assistant coach/safeties coach	1st year
Joe Gilbert	Assistant coach/offensive lineman coach and run game coordinator	1st year
Chuck Cecil	Senior defensive analyst	2nd year
Brian Johnson	Associate athletic director, head strength/conditioning coach	1st year

=== Depth chart ===
Starters and backups.

Defense

FS
Isaiah Hayes
Scottie Young Jr.
Jarrius Wallace

WLB	STUD	MIKE	WILL
⋅	Kylan Wilborn	Colin Schooler	Tony Fields II
⋅	Jalen Harris	Jacob Colacion	Anthony Pandy
⋅	Lee Anderson III	⋅	Issaiah Johnson

BANDIT
Demetrius Flannigan-Fowles
Christian Young
Chacho Ulloa

CB
Tristan Cooper
Xavier Bell
Dayven Coleman

DE	NT	DE
Justin Belknap	Dereck Boles	Jace Whittaker
J.B. Brown	Mykee Irving	Tim Hough
Jalen Cochran	⋅	Azizi Hearn; Antonio Parks

CB
Lorenzo Burns
Troy Young
McKenzie Barnes

Offense

WR
Cedric Peterson
DeVaughn Cooper
Thomas Reid III

WR
Shun Brown
Stanley Berryhill
Jailen Bailey

LT	LG	C	RG	RT
Layth Friekh	Tshiyombu Lukusa	Josh McCauley	Bryson Cain	Cody Creason
Donovan Laie	Michael Eletise	Steven Bailey	Jon Jacobs	Edgar Burrola
⋅	⋅	⋅	⋅	⋅

TE
Bryce Wolma
Jamie Nunley
Zach Peters

WR
Tony Ellison
Brian Casteel
Zach Williams

QB
Khalil Tate
K'Hari Lane
Rhett Rodriguez
or
Jamarye Joiner
or
Kevin Doyle

Key reserves
(Out for Season)
(Out)
(Suspension)
(Transfer out)

Special teams
PK Lucas Havrisik
PK Josh Pollack
P Dylan Klumph
P Jake Glatting
KR J. J. Taylor
or
Cedric Peterson
or
Gary Brightwell
or
Stanley Berryhill
PR Shun Brown/
Tony Ellison
LS Donald Reiter/
Nick Reinhardt
H Jake Glatting/
Dylan Klumph

RB
J. J. Taylor
Gary Brightwell
Anthony Mariscal

Depth Chart Source: 2018 Arizona Wildcats Football Fact Book

True Freshman
Double Position : *

== Rankings ==
=== Preseason polls ===
Poll source	Date of poll	Arizona rank	Source
SB Nation	February 9, 2018	33rd	
Orlando Sentinel	May 28, 2018	62nd	
Athlon Sports	June 20, 2018	32nd	
Sports Illustrated	August 7, 2018	19th	
CBS Sports	August 7, 2018	36th	

=== In-season polls ===
Ranking movements Legend: ██ Increase in ranking ██ Decrease in ranking — = Not ranked RV = Received votes
	Week															
Poll	Pre	1	2	3	4	5	6	7	8	9	10	11	12	13	14	Final
AP	RV	—														
Coaches	RV	—														
CFP	Not released															Not released

== Statistics ==
=== Team ===
Non-conference opponents

	1	2	3	4	Total
All opponents	21	34	28	21	104
Arizona	7	27	34	35	103

Pac-12 opponents

	1	2	3	4	Total
Pac-12 opponents	14	24	7	10	55
Arizona	17	7	21	34	79

Score total by Quarters

	1	2	3	4	Total
All opponents	35	58	35	33	161
Arizona	24	34	55	69	182

Team Statistics
	Arizona	Opponents
Points	138	118
Points per game	34.5	29.5
Points off turnovers	7	10
First Downs	108	99
Rushing	49	47
Passing	49	42
Penalty	10	10
Rushing Yards	1,061	844
Long rushing yards	72	74
Rushing Attempts	174	181
Average per rushing attempts	5.7	4.3
Average per game	247.3	192.5
Rushing TDs	9	8
Passing Yards	1,088	874
Comp–Att–INT	69–123–2	82–138–1
Average per pass	8.8	6.3
Average per catch	15.6	11.5
Average per game	272.0	218.5
Passing TDs	8	8
Total Offense	2,077	1,644
Total plays	297	317
Average per play	7.0	5.2
Average per game	519.3	411.0
Touchdown Scored	18	16
Interceptions: # – Yards	1–17	2–44
Average per INT return	17.0	22.0
TDs	0	0
Kickoff: # – Yards	20–1296	20–1110
Average per kick	64.6	59.9
Net kickoffs average	43.1	43.9
Kickoff Returns: # – Yards	16–320	4–73
Average per kickoff return	20.0	18.2
TDs	1	0
Punts: # – Yards	12–536	20–840
Average per punt	44.6	41.0
Net punt average	39.2	39.8
Punt Returns: # – Yards	5–34	3–45
Average per punt return	6.8	15.0
TDs	0	0
Fumbles – Fumbles Lost: # - Yards	6–2–0	5–0–0
TDs	0	0
Penalties – Yards	29–264	29–292
Average per game	66.0	73.0
3rd–Down Conversions	19/43 (45%)	23/52 (44%)
4th–Down Conversions	3/5 (66%)	8/10 (75%)
Sacks by - Yards	5–20	4–30
Miscellaneous Yards	0	5
Average per game of possession	27:11	32:49
Time of possession	1:48:45	2:11:15
Field Goals–Attempts	4–8	2–4
PAT–Attempts	11–12 (92%)	14–14 (100%)
Onside kicks	0–0	0–0
Red-Zone Scores	14–16 (92%)	13–17 (80%)
Red-Zone touchdowns	11–16 (69%)	11–17 (67%)

=== Offense ===
Rushing

Note: G = Games played; ATT = Attempts; YDS = Yards; AVG = Average yard per carry; LG = Longest run; TD = Rushing touchdowns

Name	GP	Att	Gain	Loss	Net	Avg	TD	Long	Avg/G
#21 J. J. Taylor	4	71	485	8	477 yards	6.7	3 TDs	62	119.2
#23 Gary Brightwell	4	44	272	9	262 yards	6.0	1 TDs	43	65.7
#25 Anthony Mariscal	4	11	70	2	68 yards	6.2	1 TDs	33	17.0
#6 Shun Brown	4	1	37	0	37 yards	37.0	0 TDs	27	9.2
#14 Khalil Tate (QB)	4	23	74	43	31 yards	1.3	2 TDs	12	7.7
#86 Stanley Berryhill (WR)	4	1	17	0	17 yards	17.0	0 TDs	17	4.2
#16 Jake Glatting (P)	4	1	8	0	8 yards	8.0	0 TDs	8	2.0
#38 Branden Leon	3	3	21	0	21 yards	7.0	1 TDs	15	7.0
#4 Rhett Rodriguez (QB)	3	3	9	2	7 yards	2.3	0 TDs	8	2.3
#20 Darrius Smith	2	15	68	6	62 yards	4.1	1 TDs	14	31.0
Total	4	174	1,061	72	989 yards	5.7	9 TDs	62	247.2

Passing

Note: G = Games played; COMP = Completions; ATT = Attempts; COMP % = Completion percentage; YDS = Passing yards; TD = Passing touchdowns; INT = Interceptions; EFF = Passing efficiency

Name	GP	Att-Cmp-Int	QBR	Pct	Yds	TD	Lng	Avg/G
#14 Khalil Tate	4	63–116–2	148.86	54.3%	1,039 yards	8 TDs	75	259.7
#4 Rhett Rodriguez	3	6–7–0	144.51	85.7%	49 yards	0 TDs	16	16.3
Total	4	69–123–2	145.61	56.1%	1,088 yards	8 TDs	75	272.0

Receiving

Note: G = Games played; REC = Receptions; YDS = Yards; AVG = Average yard per catch; LG = Longest catch; TD = Receiving touchdowns

Name	GP	Att	Yards	Avg	TD	Long	Avg/G
#19 Shawn Poindexter	4	16	369 yards	23.0	2 TDs	75	92.2
#9 Tony Ellison	4	12	241 yards	20.3	2 TDs	55	60.2
#6 Shun Brown	4	18	223 yards	12.3	3 TDs	65	55.7
#7 DeVaughn Cooper	4	3	79 yards	26.3	0 TDs	53	19.7
#86 Stanley Berryhill	4	4	66 yards	16.5	0 TDs	28	16.5
#18 Cedric Peterson	4	4	34 yards	8.5	1 TDs	16	8.5
#21 J. J. Taylor (RB)	4	4	27 yards	6.7	0 TDs	18	6.7
#85 Jamie Nunley (TE)	4	2	21 yards	10.5	0 TDs	11	5.2
#81 Bryce Wolma (TE)	4	2	13 yards	6.5	0 TDs	11	3.2
#25 Anthony Mariscal (RB)	4	1	3 yards	3.0	0 TDs	3	0.75
#82 Zach Williams (TE)	1	1	10 yards	10.0	0 TDs	10	10.0
#20 Darrius Smith (RB)	2	1	3 yards	3.0	0 TDs	3	1.5
#80 Zach Peters (TE)	1	1	-1 yards	-1.0	0 TDs	0	-1.0
#40 Thomas Reid III	0	0	0 yards	0.0	0 TDs	0	0.0
#83 Jailen Bailey	0	0	0 yards	0.0	0 TDs	0	0.0
#1 Drew Dixon	0	0	0 yards	0.0	0 TDs	0	0.0
#5 Brian Casteel	0	0	0 yards	0.0	0 TDs	0	0.0
#88 Tre Adams	0	0	0 yards	0.0	0 TDs	0	0.0
Total	4	69	1,088 yards	15.7	8 TDs	75	272.0

=== Defense ===
Note: G = Games played; Solo = Solo tackles; Ast = Assisted tackles; Total = Total tackles; TFL-Yds = Tackles for loss-yards lost; Sack = Sacks; INT = Interceptions; PD = Passes defended; FF = Forced fumbles; FR = Forced recoveries

Name	GP	Tackles				Sacks	Passing Defense		Interceptions				Fumbles		Blkd Kick
Name	GP	Solo	Ast	Total	TFL-Yds	No-Yds	BrUp	QBH	No.-Yds	Avg	TD	Long	Rcv-Yds	FF	Blkd Kick
#1 Tony Fields II	2	13	8	21	0–0 yards	0–0 yards	0	0	0–0 yards	0.0	0 TDs	0	0–0	0	0
#2 Lorenzo Burns	2	5	1	6	0–0 yards	0–0 yards	3	0	0–0 yards	0.0	0 TDs	0	0–0	0	0
#3 Jarrius Wallace	2	3	0	3	0–0 yards	0–0 yards	0	0	0–0 yards	0.0	0 TDs	0	0–0	0	0
#4 Antonio Parks	0	0	0	0	0–0 yards	0–0 yards	0	0	0–0 yards	0.0	0 TDs	0	0–0	0	0
#5 Christian Young	1	0	3	3	0.5–1 yards	0–0 yards	0	0	0–0 yards	0.0	0 TDs	0	0–0	0	0
#6 Demetrius Flannigan-Fowles	2	4	4	8	0–0 yards	0–0 yards	0	0	0–0 yards	0.0	0 TDs	0	0–0	0	0
#7 Colin Schooler	2	11	14	25	4.0–9 yards	0–0 yards	1	2	0–0 yards	0.0	0 TDs	0	0–0	0	0
#8 Tim Hough	2	6	2	8	0–0 yards	0–0 yards	1	0	0–0 yards	0.0	0 TDs	0	0–0	0	0
#9 Tony Ellison (WR)	2	1	0	1	0–0 yards	0–0 yards	0	0	0–0 yards	0.0	0 TDs	0	0–0	0	0
#9 Dayven Coleman	2	3	3	6	1.5–3 yards	0–0 yards	0	0	0–0 yards	0.0	0 TDs	0	0–0	0	0
#10 Malcolm Holland	0	0	0	0	0–0 yards	0–0 yards	0	0	0–0 yards	0.0	0 TDs	0	0–0	0	0
#12 J.B. Brown	2	0	1	1	0–0 yards	0–0 yards	0	0	0–0 yards	0.0	0 TDs	0	0–0	0	0
#13 Chacho Ulloa	0	0	0	0	0–0 yards	0–0 yards	0	0	0–0 yards	0.0	0 TDs	0	0–0	0	0
#14 Kylan Wilborn	2	1	1	2	0–0 yards	0–0 yards	0	0	0–0 yards	0.0	0 TDs	0	0–0	0	0
#15 McKenzie Barnes	2	1	0	1	0–0 yards	0–0 yards	1	0	0–0 yards	0.0	0 TDs	0	0–0	0	0
#17 Jace Whittaker	0	0	0	0	0–0 yards	0–0 yards	0	0	0–0 yards	0.0	0 TDs	0	0–0	0	0
#19 Scottie Young Jr.	0	0	0	0	0–0 yards	0–0 yards	0	0	0–0 yards	0.0	0 TDs	0	0–0	0	0
#20 Azizi Hearn	2	1	0	1	0–0 yards	0–0 yards	0	0	0–0 yards	0.0	0 TDs	0	0–0	0	0
#21 Isaiah Hayes	2	15	2	17	0–0 yards	0–0 yards	0	0	0–0 yards	0.0	0 TDs	0	0–0	0	0
#26 Anthony Pandy	2	3	1	4	1.0–1 yards	0–0 yards	0	0	0–0 yards	0.0	0 TDs	0	0–0	0	0
#27 Sammy Morrison	0	0	0	0	0–0 yards	0–0 yards	0	0	0–0 yards	0.0	0 TDs	0	0–0	0	0
#31 Tristan Cooper	1	0	2	2	0–0 yards	0–0 yards	0	0	0–0 yards	0.0	0 TDs	0	0–0	0	0
#34 Jacob Colacion	0	0	0	0	0–0 yards	0–0 yards	0	0	0–0 yards	0.0	0 TDs	0	0–0	0	0
#37 Xavier Bell	2	6	3	9	0–0 yards	– yards	0	0	0–0 yards	0.0	0 TDs	0	0–0	0	0
#42 Dylan Klumph (P)	2	1	0	1	0–0 yards	0–0 yards	0	0	0–0 yards	0.0	0 TDs	0	0–0	0	0
#44 Kurtis Brown	1	0	1	1	0–0 yards	0–0 yards	0	0	0–0 yards	0.0	0 TDs	0	0–0	0	0
#45 Issaiah Johnson	0	0	0	0	0–0 yards	0–0 yards	0	0	0–0 yards	0.0	0 TDs	0	0–0	0	0
#49 Jalen Harris	2	0	1	1	0–0 yards	0–0 yards	0	0	0–0 yards	0.0	0 TDs	0	0–0	0	0
#51 Lee Anderson III	2	1	0	1	0–0 yards	0–0 yards	0	0	0–0 yards	0.0	0 TDs	0	0–0	0	0
#52 P. J. Johnson	0	0	0	0	0–0 yards	0–0 yards	0	0	0–0 yards	0.0	0 TDs	0	0–0	0	0
#56 Nick Reinhardt (LS)	2	1	0	1	0–0 yards	0–0 yards	0	0	0–0 yards	0.0	0 TDs	0	0–0	0	0
#71 Abraham Maiava	1	1	2	3	0–0 yards	0–0 yards	0	0	0–0 yards	0.0	0 TDs	0	0–0	0	0
#81 Jalen Cochran	1	1	0	1	0–0 yards	0–0 yards	0	0	0–0 yards	0.0	0 TDs	0	0–0	0	0
#86 Justin Belknap	1	2	2	4	0–0 yards	0–0 yards	0	0	0–0 yards	0.0	0 TDs	0	0–0	0	0
#91 Finton Connolly	2	0	3	3	1.0–1 yards	0–0 yards	0	0	0–0 yards	0.0	0 TDs	0	0–0	0	0
#99 Dereck Boles	2	2	2	4	0–0 yards	0–0 yards	0	0	0–0 yards	0.0	0 TDs	0	0–0	0	0
Total	2	84	56	140	8.0–15 yards	0.0–0 yards	8	3	0–0 yards	0.0	0 TDs	0	0–0	0	0

=== Special teams ===
Kick and punt returning

Note: G = Games played; PR = Punt returns; PYDS = Punt return yards; PLG = Punt return long; KR = Kick returns; KYDS = Kick return yards; KLG = Kick return long; TD = Total return touchdowns

Pos.	Player	G	PR	PYDS	PLG	AVG	Total PR TDs	KR	KYDS	KLG	Total KOR TDs	AVG
WR	Cedric Peterson	3	0	0	0	0	0	2	32	19	0	15.0
WR	Stanley Berryhill	3	0	0	0	0	0	2	32	19	0	16.0
RB	J. J. Taylor	3	0	0	0	0	0	8	231	84	1	28.9
RB	Gary Brightwell	0	0	0	0	0	0	0	0	0	0	0
WR	Shun Brown	3	2	14	15	7.0	0	0	0	0	0	0
WR	Tony Ellison	0	0	0	0	0	0	0	0	0	0	0
TE	Jamie Nunley	3	0	0	0	0	0	2	4	4	0	2.0
TE	Bryce Wolma	3	0	0	0	0	0	1	1	1	0	1.0

Kicking

Note: G = Games played; FGM = Field goals made; FGA = Field goals attempted; LG = Field goal long; XPT = Extra points made; XPT ATT = XPT attempted; In20 = Kicking inside the 20; 20-29 = Kicking inside the 20-29; 30-39 = Kicking inside the 30-39; 40-49 = Kicking inside the 40-49; 50 = Kicking inside the 50; TP = Total points

Pos.	Player	G	FGM	FGA	LG	I20	20-29	30-39	40-49	50+	BLK	XPT	XPT ATT	KO	KO Yards	TB	AVG	OB
K	Lucas Havrisik	2	2	4	49	0-0	1-1	0-0	1-2	0-1	1	3	4	9	581	7	64.6	1
K	Josh Pollack	0	0	0	0	0-0	0-0	0-0	0-0	0-0	0	0	0	0	0	0	0.0	0

Punting

Note: G = Games played; P = Punts; YDS = Yards; AVG = Average per punt; LG = Punt long; In20 = Punts inside the 20; TB = Touchbacks

Pos.	Player	G	P	YDS	AVG	LG	FC	In20	50+	TB	BLK
P	Dylan Klumph	2	11	482	43.8	53	4	4	3	1	0
P	Jake Glatting	0	0	0	0	0	0	0	0	0	0

== Awards and honors ==
=== Weekly awards ===
- Khalil Tate

Pac-12 Rose Bowl Player of the Week, week 3 vs Southern Utah

- J. J. Taylor

Pac-12 Offensive Player of the Week, week 4 vs Oregon State

=== All-Americans ===
- J. J. Taylor, RB – AP Third Team

=== All-Pac-12 teams ===
3rd Team

- J. J. Taylor, Running Back (AP-3)

=== 2019 NFL draft ===
==== Team players drafted into the NFL ====
Player	Position	Round	Pick	NFL team
P. J. Johnson	DT	7	229	Detroit Lions

== Media affiliates ==
=== Radio ===
- ESPN Radio – (ESPN Tucson 1490 AM & 104.09 FM) – Nationwide (Dish Network, Sirius XM, TuneIn radio and iHeartRadio)
- KCUB 1290 AM – Football Radio Show – (Tucson, AZ)
- KHYT – 107.5 FM (Tucson, AZ)
- KTKT 990 AM – La Hora de Los Gatos (Spanish) – (Tucson, AZ)
- KGME 910 AM – (IMG Sports Network) – (Phoenix, AZ)
- KTAN 1420 AM – (Sierra Vista, AZ)
- KDAP 96.5 FM (Douglas, Arizona)
- KWRQ 102.3 FM – (Safford, AZ/Thatcher, AZ)
- KIKO 1340 AM – (Globe, AZ)
- KVWM 970 AM – (Show Low, AZ/Pinetop-Lakeside, AZ)
- XENY 760 – (Nogales, Sonora) (Spanish)

=== TV ===
- CBS Family - KOLD (CBS), CBSN
- ABC/ESPN Family - KGUN (ABC), ABC, ESPN, ESPN2, ESPNU, ESPN+,
- FOX Family - KMSB (FOX), FOX/FS1, FSN
- Pac-12 Network (Pac-12 Arizona)
