= Luther Burbank High School (California) =

Coordinates: 38°29′41″N 121°27′57″W

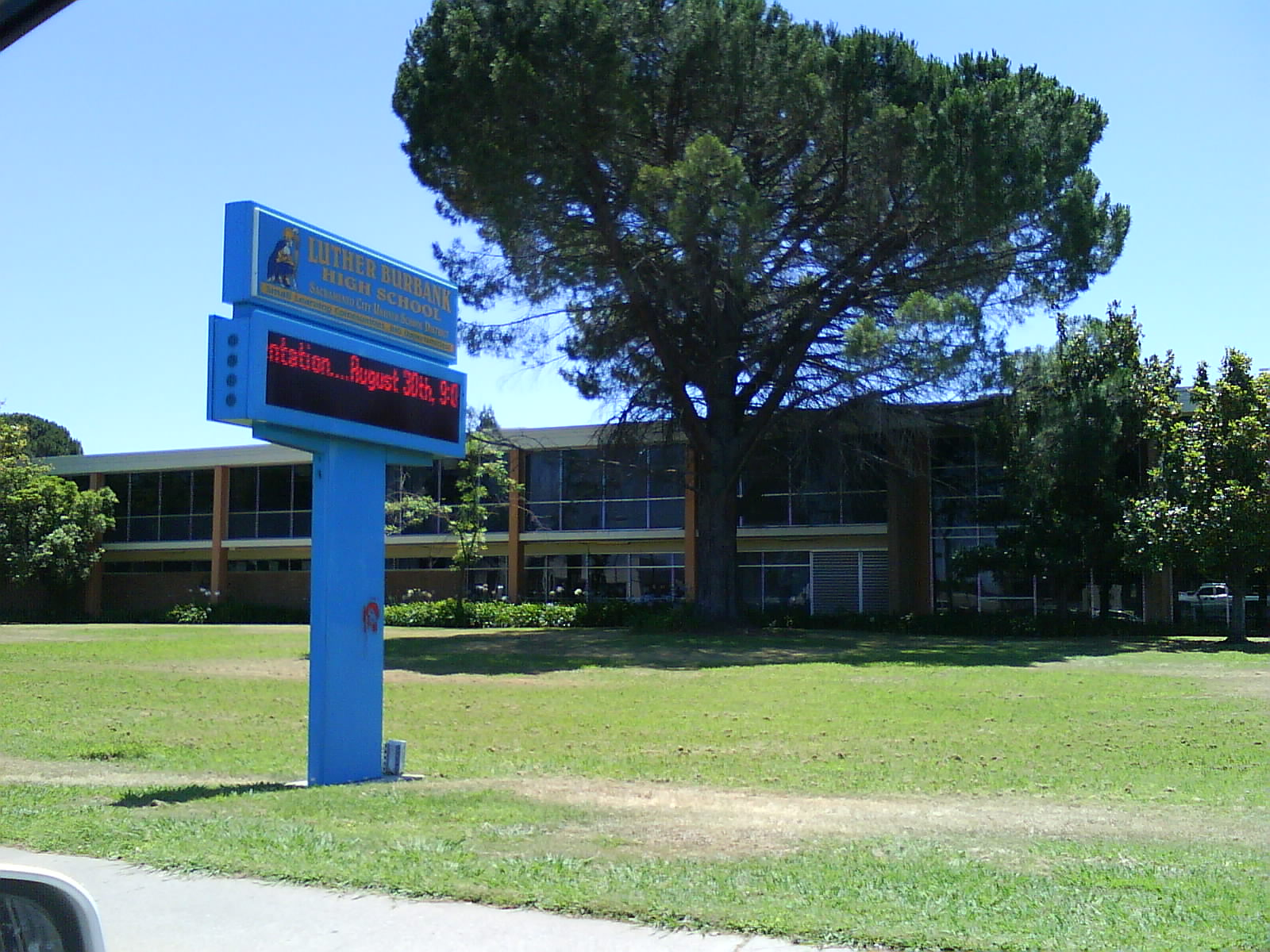

Location
- 3500 Florin Road; Sacramento, California 95823; United States of America

Information
- School type: Public
- School district: Sacramento City Unified School District
- Principal: Jim Peterson
- Enrollment: 1,574 (2023–2024)
- Colors: Blue and gold
- Team name: Titans
- Website: Luther Burbank High School

Luther Burbank High School (LBHS) is a high school in Sacramento, California, United States. It is a part of the Sacramento City Unified School District.

As of 2002 the school offers a Hmong language class for native speakers of Hmong.

== Notable alumni ==
- Levelle Bailey, Class of 2019, NFL player
- Gary Darling, Class of 1975, MLB umpire
- Karen DeSanto, Wisconsin state legislator
- James Donaldson, NBA player
- Zach Hill, Drummer and member of Death Grips
- Mickey Ibarra, Class of 1969, Assistant to the President & Director of Intergovernmental Affairs, The White House, 1997-2001
- D. J. Johnson, Class of 2017, NFL player
- P. J. Johnson, Class of 2014, NFL player
- Terrance Mitchell, NFL player
- James Mouton, Class of 1987, MLB
- Ricky Reynolds, NFL player

== See also ==
- Luther Burbank
