= P. J. Johnson =

American football player (born 1996)

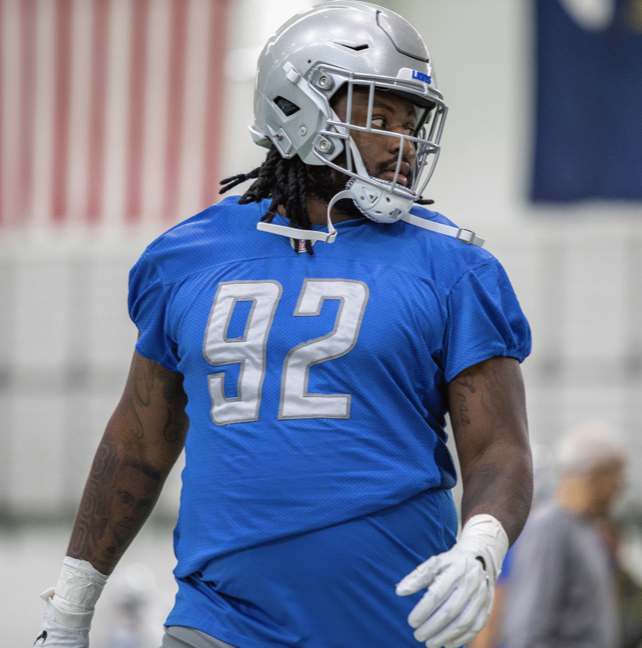
- Johnson with the Detroit Lions in 2019

No. 92
- Position: Defensive tackle

Personal information
- Born: June 14, 1996 (age 30); Sacramento, California, U.S.
- Listed height: 6 ft 3 in (1.91 m)
- Listed weight: 320 lb (145 kg)

Career information
- High school: Luther Burbank (Sacramento, California)
- College: Sacramento State (2014–2016); City College of San Francisco (2017); Arizona (2018)
- NFL draft: 2019: 7th round, 229th overall pick

Career history
- Detroit Lions (2019)*; Los Angeles Chargers (2019)*; Seattle Seahawks (2020)*; Arizona Cardinals (2020)*; Carolina Panthers (2021)*; Detroit Lions (2021)*; Las Vegas Raiders (2021)*
- * Offseason or practice squad member only
- Stats at Pro Football Reference

P. J. Johnson (born June 14, 1996) is an American former professional football nose tackle. Johnson played college football at Arizona, and was drafted by the Detroit Lions in the seventh round of the 2019 NFL draft. He was also a member of the Los Angeles Chargers, Seattle Seahawks, Arizona Cardinals, Carolina Panthers, and Las Vegas Raiders.

== Early life ==
Johnson attended Monterey Trail High School in Elk Grove, California, before transferring to Luther Burbank High School in Sacramento, California during his sophomore year. He played on both the offensive and defensive lines for the Titans, where he posted 90 tackles and six sacks as a senior, and was a two-time first-team all-Metro League selection. He also played baseball and basketball in high school.

== College career ==
Johnson began his collegiate career at Sacramento State, where he was redshirted during the 2014 season, after suffering from a burst appendix. During the 2015 season, he appeared in all 11 games for the Hornets on the defensive line, and posted 13 tackles, including 4.5 tackles-for-loss, a sack and a forced fumble.

Johnson missed the 2016 season after suffering a leg injury on September 17, 2016. Tests revealed a tumor in Johnson's right leg, which he had removed in January 2017. Johnson transferred to City College of San Francisco during the 2017 season, where he played in 10 games and posted 17 tackles, 8.5 tackles-for-loss, 4.5 sacks and a forced fumble.

After leaving the San Francisco, Johnson received offers from Coastal Carolina, Florida Atlantic, Kansas, Massachusetts, New Mexico, Rutgers, Southeastern Louisiana and UNLV. In December 2017, Johnson announced he would sign with Arizona. During the 2018 season, Johnson appeared in 10 games for the Wildcats, including nine starts, where he posted 31 tackles, 8.5 tackles-for-loss, 3.0 sacks, one pass breakup, a forced fumble, two fumble recoveries and a safety. Following the season, he was named a Pac-12 Conference All-Conference honorable mention. In January 2019, Johnson declared for the NFL draft.

== Professional career ==
=== Detroit Lions (first stint) ===
Johnson was drafted by the Detroit Lions in the seventh round (229th overall) of the 2019 NFL draft. He was waived on August 31, 2019.

=== Los Angeles Chargers ===
On December 4, 2019, Johnson was signed to the practice squad of the Los Angeles Chargers. He signed a futures contract with the Chargers on December 30. Johnson was waived on August 1, 2020.

=== Seattle Seahawks ===
Johnson signed with the Seattle Seahawks on August 18, 2020. He was waived by Seattle on September 5.

=== Arizona Cardinals ===
On November 24, 2020, Johnson was signed to the Arizona Cardinals' practice squad. On December 22, Johnson was released by the Cardinals.

=== Carolina Panthers ===
Johnson signed with the Carolina Panthers on April 13, 2021. He was waived on May 16.

=== Detroit Lions (second stint) ===
On August 7, 2021, Johnson signed with the Detroit Lions. He was waived on August 23.

=== Las Vegas Raiders ===
On November 17, 2021, Johnson was signed to the Las Vegas Raiders practice squad. After the Raiders were eliminated in the 2021 Wild Card round of the playoffs, he signed a reserve/future contract on January 17, 2022. Johnson was released on March 25.

== Personal life ==
Johnson has three children, a son, Tolu, and two daughters, Kiara and Brooklynn.

Johnson's brother, D. J., was drafted by the Carolina Panthers in the 3rd round of the 2023 NFL draft.
