= D. J. Johnson (linebacker) =

American football player (born 1998)

Profile
- Position: Outside linebacker

Personal information
- Born: October 21, 1998 (age 28); Sacramento, California, U.S.
- Listed height: 6 ft 4 in (1.93 m)
- Listed weight: 260 lb (118 kg)

Career information
- High school: Luther Burbank (Sacramento)
- College: Miami (FL) (2017); Oregon (2018–2022)
- NFL draft: 2023: 3rd round, 80th overall pick

Career history
- Carolina Panthers (2023–2025); Washington Commanders (2025–2026)*; Green Bay Packers (2026)*
- * Offseason or practice squad member only

Career NFL statistics as of Week 10, 2026
- Total tackles: 62
- Sacks: 0.5
- Fumble recoveries: 1
- Pass deflections: 2
- Stats at Pro Football Reference

D. J. Johnson (born October 21, 1998) is an American professional football outside linebacker. Johnson played college football for the Miami Hurricanes and Oregon Ducks. He was selected by the Carolina Panthers in third round of the 2023 NFL draft.

== Early life ==
Johnson grew up in Sacramento, California, and attended Luther Burbank High School. He had 85 tackles, 14.5 sacks, and 31 tackles for loss as a senior. Johnson was rated a four-star recruit and committed to play college football at Miami over offers from Washington, Alabama, USC, Florida, Georgia, Oregon, Ole Miss, Tennessee, and Oklahoma.

== College career ==
Johnson began his college career at Miami. He played in eight games and made three tackles as a freshman. After the season, Johnson left the program with the intent to transfer.

Johnson ultimately transferred to Oregon. He sat out for the regular season of his first year with the Ducks per NCAA transfer rules. As a redshirt sophomore, Johnson played in 13 games and finished the season with 14 tackles, five tackles for loss, and two sacks. He was moved to tight end for the 2020 season. Johnson finished the season with 10 receptions for 113 yards and three touchdowns. He played both defensive end and tight end as a redshirt senior and had 11 tackles with two tackles for loss and a sack on defense and caught one pass for 11 yards on offense. Johnson used the extra year of eligibility granted to college athletes in 2020 due to the COVID-19 pandemic and returned to Oregon for a fifth year.

== Professional career ==
Pre-draft measurables
Height	Weight	Arm length	Hand span	Wingspan	40-yard dash	10-yard split	20-yard split	20-yard shuttle	Three-cone drill	Vertical jump	Broad jump	Bench press
6 ft 4 in (1.93 m)	260 lb (118 kg)	33 1/4 in (0.84 m)	9 in (0.23 m)	6 ft 8 1/8 in (2.04 m)	4.49 s	1.59 s	2.58 s	4.51 s	7.33 s	32.0 in (0.81 m)	9 ft 7 in (2.92 m)	28 reps
All values from NFL Combine/Pro Day

=== Carolina Panthers ===
The Carolina Panthers traded up to the 80th overall pick to select Johnson in the 2023 NFL draft.

On January 2, 2025, Johnson was involved in a two-car collision in Charlotte, North Carolina that resulted in him suffering a concussion. He was subsequently placed on Carolina's NFI list and ruled out for their season finale against the Atlanta Falcons. Johnson finished the season having appeared in 14 games (2 starts), with 1 pass deflection, 1 fumble recovery, 0.5 sacks, and 44 combined tackles.

On September 30, 2025, Johnson was waived by the Panthers.

=== Washington Commanders ===
On December 31, 2025, Johnson was signed to the Washington Commanders' practice squad. On January 5, 2026, he signed a reserve/futures contract with the Commanders. Johnson was released by the Commanders as a part of final roster cuts on August 30. He was re–signed to Washington's practice squad the following day. Johnson was released by the Commanders on September 15.

=== Green Bay Packers ===
On November 3, 2026, Johnson signed with the Green Bay Packers practice squad. On November 21, he was released.

== Personal life ==
Johnson's brother, P. J., was selected by the Detroit Lions in the seventh round of the 2019 NFL draft.
