= Khalil Tate =

American gridiron football player (born 1998)

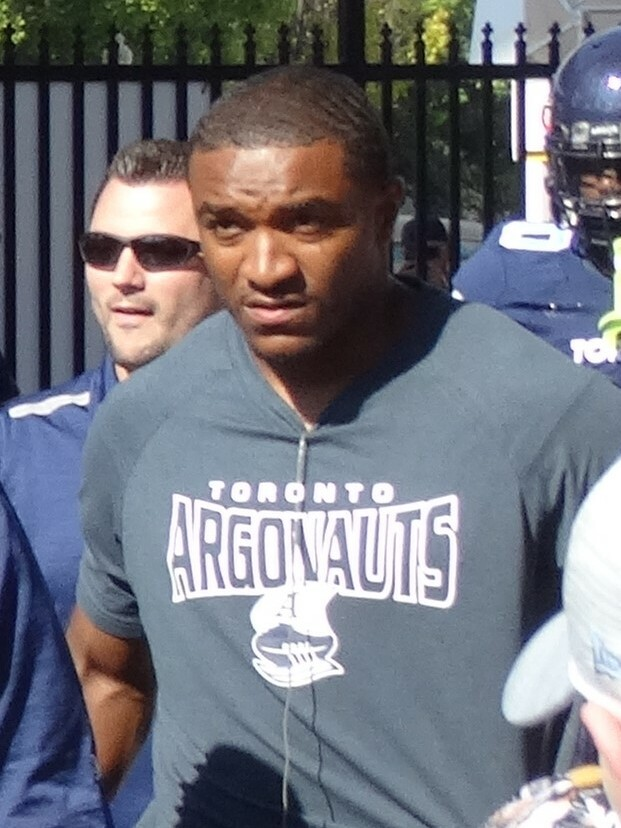
- Tate with the Toronto Argonauts in 2022

Profile
- Position: Quarterback / Wide receiver

Personal information
- Born: October 23, 1998 (age 28); Inglewood, California, U.S.
- Listed height: 6 ft 0 in (1.83 m)
- Listed weight: 215 lb (98 kg)

Career information
- High school: Junípero Serra (Gardena, California)
- College: Arizona (2016–2019)
- NFL draft: 2020: undrafted

Career history
- Philadelphia Eagles (2020–2021)*; Edmonton Elks (2022)*; Toronto Argonauts (2022)*; Edmonton Elks (2023)
- * Offseason or practice squad member only
- Stats at Pro Football Reference
- Stats at CFL.ca

Khalil Tate (born October 23, 1998) is an American former football quarterback. He played college football for the Arizona Wildcats. He signed with the Philadelphia Eagles as a wide receiver in 2020.

== Early life ==
Tate attended Junípero Serra High School in Gardena, California. As a senior, he had over 2,000 passing and 2,000 rushing yards and accounted for 43 touchdowns. Tate was a consensus 4-star recruit and named a top-ten dual threat quarterback by ESPN. On March 16, 2015, Tate committed to play college football for the University of Arizona.

College recruiting
Name	Hometown	School	Height	Weight	40^{‡}	Commit date
Khalil Tate; QB	Inglewood, California	Junípero Serra High School	6 ft 0 in (1.83 m)	209 lb (95 kg)	4.72	Mar 16, 2015
Khalil Tate; QB	Recruit ratings: Scout: Rivals: 247Sports: (80)					
Overall recruit ranking:
‡ Refers to 40-yard dash; Note: In many cases, Scout, Rivals, 247Sports, On3, and ESPN may conflict in their listings of height, weight and 40 time.; In these cases, the average was taken. ESPN grades are on a 100-point scale.; Sources: "2016 Team Ranking". Rivals.com.

== College career ==
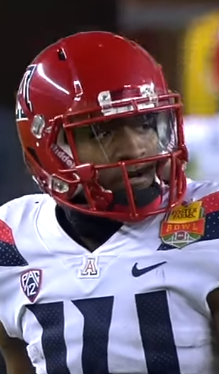
Tate with Arizona in 2018

In 2016, at only 17 years old, Tate started his college career as a true freshman at Arizona. He became the first true freshman to start a game at Arizona since Willie Tuitama in 2005. Tate played in seven games and made one start. In his debut against UCLA, Tate completed five of nine passes for 72 yards and two touchdowns and rushed for 79 yards on 15 carries. Two weeks later he made his first career start against USC and completed seven of 18 passes for 58 yards with an interception and added 72 rushing yards and a touchdown. For the season, Tate completed 18 of 45 passes for 243 yards, three touchdowns, three interceptions and rushed for 237 yards over 49 carries with one touchdown.

Tate entered his sophomore season in 2017 as the backup to Brandon Dawkins. When Dawkins went down with an injury early against Colorado, Tate relieved him for the remainder of the game. During the game, he rushed for an FBS quarterback-record 327 yards, breaking the previous record of 321 held by Jordan Lynch. Following his performance, Tate was awarded the Pac-12 Offensive player of the week and would be named starting quarterback. He would follow up his opening performance with wins over UCLA, Cal, and Washington State eventually being named Pac-12 Offensive player of the week for four consecutive weeks – setting a conference record.

Tate entered his senior season as the full-time starter for the Wildcats. He made his season debut against Hawaii, narrowly losing 38–45. Tate completed 22 of 39 attempts for 361 yards, 2 touchdowns, and 3 interceptions.

=== Statistics ===
Year	Team	Games			Passing								Rushing			
Year	Team	GP	GS	Record	Cmp	Att	Pct	Yds	Avg	TD	INT	Rtg	Att	Yds	Avg	TD
2016	Arizona	7	1	0–1	18	45	40.0	243	5.4	3	3	94.0	49	237	4.8	1
2017	Arizona	11	8	4–4	111	179	62.0	1,591	8.9	14	9	152.4	153	1,411	9.2	12
2018	Arizona	11	11	5–6	170	302	56.3	2,530	8.4	26	8	149.8	74	224	3.0	2
2019	Arizona	11	9	3–6	160	266	60.2	1,954	7.3	14	11	131.0	90	413	4.6	3
Career		40	29	12–17	459	792	58.0	6,318	8.0	57	31	140.9	366	2,285	6.2	18

=== Awards and honors ===
- AP Pac-12 Newcomer Player of the Year (2017)
- 4× Pac-12 Offensive Player of the Week (2017)
- All-Pac-12 Academic Honorable Mention (2017)
- All-Pac-12 Honorable Mention (2017)

== Professional career ==
Pre-draft measurables
Height	Weight	Arm length	Hand span
5 ft 11 7/8 in (1.83 m)	217 lb (98 kg)	32 7/8 in (0.84 m)	10 in (0.25 m)
All values from Pro Day

=== Philadelphia Eagles ===
On April 26, 2020, the Philadelphia Eagles signed Tate as an undrafted free agent with the intention of converting him to wide receiver. He was waived by the team on July 20. On January 13, 2021, Tate signed a reserve/futures contract with the Eagles. He was waived by Philadelphia on June 9.

=== Edmonton Elks ===
On January 18, 2022, Tate signed with the Edmonton Elks of the Canadian Football League (CFL) as a quarterback. He was released at the start of training camp on May 15.

=== Toronto Argonauts ===
On July 27, 2022, Tate signed with the Toronto Argonauts of the Canadian Football League. Tate was released by the Argos on August 9. He did not make an appearance for the Argonauts during the 2022 season.

=== Edmonton Elks (second stint) ===
Tate returned to the Elks on March 21, 2023. On May 28, he was released by the Elks as part of the training camp roster cuts. The Elks brought Tate back on June 27.
