= J. J. Taylor =

American football player (born 1998)

Profile
- Position: Running back

Personal information
- Born: January 4, 1998 (age 28); Corona, California, U.S.
- Listed height: 5 ft 6 in (1.68 m)
- Listed weight: 185 lb (84 kg)

Career information
- High school: Centennial (Corona)
- College: Arizona (2016–2019)
- NFL draft: 2020: undrafted

Career history
- New England Patriots (2020–2022); Houston Texans (2023–2024); Winnipeg Blue Bombers (2026)*
- * Offseason or practice squad member only

Awards and highlights
- First-team All-Pac-12 (2018); Pac-12 Offensive Freshman of the Year (2017)

Career NFL statistics
- Rushing yards: 200
- Rushing average: 3.2
- Rushing touchdowns: 2
- Receptions: 8
- Receiving yards: 20
- Return yards: 123
- Stats at Pro Football Reference

Joseph Justyn Taylor (born January 4, 1998) is an American former professional football who was a running back and return specialist in the National Football League (NFL). He played college football for the Arizona Wildcats. Taylor is also a professional Rocket League esports player of Team Oxygen.

== Early life ==
Taylor graduated in 2016 from Centennial High School in Corona, California. After converting from defensive back to running back, he was named Mr. Football as state's top offensive player by CalHiSports.com. Also he was named All-Inland First-team. He was recognized as a Blue-Grey All-American. He gained 2,290 yards and 44 touchdowns as a senior. He earned a three-star recruit by Scout.com, Rivals.com and 247 Sports. Taylor had offers from Washington State, Nevada, Ohio, Montana State, Sacramento State and Weber State from the Big Sky Conference as well. Taylor committed to Arizona in 2015.

== College career ==
=== 2016 season ===
He played in four games with one career start before going down with an injury as a true freshman. Taylor rushed for 261 yards and two touchdowns on 38 carries, even though he barely played in Arizona's first game of the season against BYU. The best proof came in a two-game stretch where Taylor rushed for a combined 267 yards on 37 carries with two touchdowns, particularly in Arizona's dominant win over Hawaii in Week 3. Taylor was poised for a breakout freshman season before the injury in Pac-12 opener, which occurred during the Wildcats’ fourth game against Washington. He still totaled 97 yards on 19 carries with a touchdown.

=== 2017 season ===
Taylor, a redshirt freshman from Corona, California, played in all 12 games and was the Pac-12's top freshman rusher with 828 yards (6.1 yards/carry), averaged 69.0 yards per game, and added five touchdowns. He rushed for a career-best 153 yards on 14 carries (10.9 avg.) with two touchdowns vs. Washington State. Taylor was a major contributor to Arizona's ground game that averaged 324.4 yards per game (3rd in the FBS) and a school single-season team record 48 rushing touchdowns. Arizona rushed for 300 or more yards seven times, including a pair of 500+ yard games with a UA single-game record 534 yards vs. Oregon State. He was the Pac-12 Offensive Freshman of the Year.

=== 2018 season ===
Taylor was put on the Doak Walker Award watch list in July 2018. Against Southern Utah, Taylor returned a kickoff for a touchdown. His redshirt sophomore year finished with 1,434 rushing yards and, 49 receiving yards, and seven total touchdowns.

=== 2019 season ===
As a redshirted junior in 2019, Taylor finished with 721 rushing yards and five touchdowns. On November 19, 2019, Taylor announced that we would forgo his senior year and enter the 2020 NFL draft.

== Professional career ==
Pre-draft measurables
Height	Weight	Arm length	Hand span	Wingspan	40-yard dash	10-yard split	20-yard split	20-yard shuttle	Three-cone drill	Vertical jump	Broad jump	Bench press
5 ft 5 1/4 in (1.66 m)	185 lb (84 kg)	28 3/4 in (0.73 m)	8 1/2 in (0.22 m)	5 ft 11 1/4 in (1.81 m)	4.61 s	1.54 s	2.70 s	4.15 s	7.00 s	34.5 in (0.88 m)	9 ft 10 in (3.00 m)	19 reps
All values from NFL Combine

=== New England Patriots ===
Taylor signed with the New England Patriots as an undrafted free agent on May 5, 2020. On September 5, 2020, he was waived by the team and signed to the practice squad the following day. He was promoted to the active roster on September 7, 2020. Taylor made his professional debut in the Patriots Week one victory over the Miami Dolphins.

Arguably his best game as a pro came on October 24, 2021. Taylor rushed for 21 yards and had two touchdowns during a Patriots 54–13 win over the New York Jets.

On August 30, 2022, Taylor was waived by the Patriots and signed to the practice squad the next day. He was promoted to the active roster on November 5. He was waived on November 21 and re-signed to the practice squad. He signed a reserve/future contract on January 10, 2023. He was released on August 29, 2023.

=== Houston Texans ===
On November 1, 2023, Taylor was signed to the Houston Texans' practice squad. He signed a reserve/future contract with Houston on January 22, 2024.

Taylor was released by the Texans on August 27, 2024, and re-signed to the practice squad. He was promoted to the active roster on October 30. Taylor signed a reserve/future contract with Houston on January 21, 2025. On August 19, Taylor was released by the Texans.

=== Winnipeg Blue Bombers ===
On February 2, 2026, Taylor signed with the Winnipeg Blue Bombers of the Canadian Football League. He retired from professional football on April 30.

== Career statistics ==
Legend
**Bold**	Career high

=== NFL ===
Year	Team	Games		Rushing					Receiving					Fumbles	
Year	Team	GP	GS	Att	Yds	Avg	Lng	TD	Rec	Yds	Avg	Lng	TD	Fum	Lost
2020	NE	6	0	**23**	**110**	**4.8**	**28**	0	1	4	4.0	4	0	0	0
2021	NE	5	0	19	37	1.9	15	**2**	**4**	**8**	2.0	**5**	0	**1**	**1**
2022	NE	1	0	10	9	0.9	5	0	1	**8**	**8.0**	4	0	0	0
2024	HOU	5	0	10	44	4.4	9	0	2	0	0.0	0	0	0	0
Career		17	0	62	200	3.2	28	2	8	20	2.5	8	0	1	1

=== College ===
Season	Team	Class	Rushing				Receiving				Scrimmage			
Season	Team	Class	Att	Yds	Avg	TD	Rec	Yds	Avg	TD	Plays	Yds	Avg	TD
2016	Arizona	FR	38	261	**6.9**	2	2	16	8.0	0	40	277	**6.9**	2
2017	Arizona	FR	146	847	5.8	5	12	49	4.1	**2**	158	896	5.7	**7**
2018	Arizona	SO	**255**	**1,434**	5.6	**6**	16	133	8.3	0	**271**	**1,567**	5.8	6
2019	Arizona	JR	148	721	4.9	5	**32**	**289**	**9.0**	0	180	1,010	5.6	5
Career			587	3,263	5.6	18	62	487	7.9	2	649	3,750	5.8	20
