= Demetrius Flannigan-Fowles =

American football player (born 1996)

Profile
- Position: Linebacker

Personal information
- Born: September 4, 1996 (age 30); Tucson, Arizona, U.S.
- Listed height: 6 ft 2 in (1.88 m)
- Listed weight: 223 lb (101 kg)

Career information
- High school: Mountain View (Tucson)
- College: Arizona (2015–2018)
- NFL draft: 2019: undrafted

Career history
- San Francisco 49ers (2019–2024); New York Giants (2025); Buffalo Bills (2026)*
- * Offseason or practice squad member only

Career NFL statistics as of 2025
- Total tackles: 129
- Sacks: 2
- Pass deflections: 4
- Stats at Pro Football Reference

Demetrius Flannigan-Fowles (born September 4, 1996) is an American professional football linebacker. He played college football for the Arizona Wildcats before being signed as an undrafted free agent in 2019 by the San Francisco 49ers.

== College career ==
Flannigan-Fowles played for the Arizona Wildcats for four seasons. He finished his collegiate career with 243 tackles, 10 tackles for loss, three forced fumbles, and two fumble recoveries with 22 passes defended and six interceptions in 50 games played.

== Professional career ==
Pre-draft measurables
Height	Weight	Arm length	Hand span	Wingspan	40-yard dash	10-yard split	20-yard split	20-yard shuttle	Three-cone drill	Vertical jump	Broad jump	Bench press
6 ft 1 5/8 in (1.87 m)	205 lb (93 kg)	32 1/4 in (0.82 m)	9 1/8 in (0.23 m)	6 ft 5 in (1.96 m)	4.58 s	1.63 s	2.65 s	4.41 s	7.25 s	34.5 in (0.88 m)	10 ft 3 in (3.12 m)	15 reps
All values from Pro Day

=== San Francisco 49ers ===
Flannigan-Fowles was signed by the San Francisco 49ers as an undrafted free agent on May 3, 2019. He was waived on August 31, during final roster cuts but was re-signed to San Francisco's practice squad the following day. Flannigan-Fowles was placed on the practice squad injured list on December 10. He signed a futures/reserve contract with the 49ers on February 5, 2020, and made the active roster out of training camp in 2020. In 2020 Flannigan-Fowles played in 11 games, mostly on special teams, with one started and finished the season with nine total tackles. In the 2021 season, he appeared in all 17 games and started two. He had 29 total tackles.

On March 11, 2022, Flannigan-Fowles signed a one-year extension with the 49ers. He appeared in all 17 games in the 2022 season. Flannigan-Fowles recorded one sack, which came against the Carolina Panthers in Week 5.

On March 16, 2023, Flannigan-Fowles signed a one-year extension with the 49ers. In the 2023 season, he appeared in 16 games and made one start.

On March 15, 2024, Flannigan-Fowles re-signed with the 49ers. In 12 games (3 starts) for San Francisco, he recorded 2 pass deflections and 17 combined tackles. On February 18, 2025, Flannigan-Fowles was released by the 49ers.

=== New York Giants ===
On March 14, 2025, Flannigan-Fowles signed with the New York Giants. He made 10 appearances (including three starts) for the Giants, recording one pass deflection, one sack, and 33 combined tackles.

=== Buffalo Bills ===
On May 27, 2026, Flannigan-Fowles signed a one-year contract with the Buffalo Bills. He was placed on injured reserve on August 6, after suffering an undisclosed injury during training camp. Flannigan-Fowles was released by the Bills with an injury settlement on September 4.
