= 2022 Washington State Cougars football team =

American college football season

2022 Washington State Cougars football

LA Bowl, L 6–29 vs. Fresno State
- Conference: Pac–12 Conference
- Record: 7–6 (4–5 Pac–12)
- Head coach: Jake Dickert (2nd season)
- Offensive coordinator: Eric Morris (1st season)
- Offensive scheme: Air raid
- Defensive coordinator: Brian Ward (1st season)
- Base defense: Multiple
- Home stadium: Martin Stadium

2022 Pac-12 Conference football standings
	Conf.			Overall
Team	W		L	W		L
No. 12 USC y	8	–	1	11	–	3
No. 10 Utah y$	7	–	2	10	–	4
No. 8 Washington	7	–	2	11	–	2
No. 15 Oregon	7	–	2	10	–	3
No. 17 Oregon State	6	–	3	10	–	3
No. 21 UCLA	6	–	3	9	–	4
Washington State	4	–	5	7	–	6
Arizona	3	–	6	5	–	7
California	2	–	7	4	–	8
Arizona State†	2	–	7	3	–	9
Stanford	1	–	8	3	–	9
Colorado	1	–	8	1	–	11
Championship: Utah 47, USC 24
$ – Conference champion; y – Championship game participant; Rankings from AP Poll

The 2022 Washington State Cougars football team represented Washington State University during the 2022 NCAA Division I FBS football season. The Cougars played their home games at Martin Stadium in Pullman, Washington, and competed as members of the Pac–12 Conference. They were led by head coach Jake Dickert, in his second season.

== Schedule ==
Date	Time	Opponent	Site	TV	Result	Attendance
September 3	6:30 p.m.	Idaho*	Martin Stadium; Pullman, WA (Battle of the Palouse)	P12N	W 24–17	25,233
September 10	12:30 p.m.	at No. 19 Wisconsin*	Camp Randall Stadium; Madison, WI	FOX	W 17–14	74,001
September 17	2:00 p.m.	Colorado State*	Martin Stadium; Pullman, WA	P12N	W 38–7	23,611
September 24	1:00 p.m.	No. 15 Oregon	Martin Stadium; Pullman, WA	FOX	L 41–44	33,058
October 1	2:30 p.m.	California^{†}	Martin Stadium; Pullman, WA	P12N	W 28–9	23,021
October 8	4:30 p.m.	at No. 6 USC	Los Angeles Memorial Coliseum; Los Angeles, CA	FOX	L 14–30	63,204
October 15	6:00 p.m.	at Oregon State	Reser Stadium; Corvallis, OR	P12N	L 10–24	28,735
October 27	7:00 p.m.	No. 14 Utah	Martin Stadium; Pullman, WA	FS1	L 17–21	21,179
November 5	12:30 p.m.	at Stanford	Stanford Stadium; Stanford, CA	P12N	W 52–14	26,515
November 12	12:30 p.m.	Arizona State	Martin Stadium; Pullman, WA	P12N	W 28–18	24,039
November 19	11:00 a.m.	at Arizona	Arizona Stadium; Tucson, AZ	P12N	W 31–20	40,717
November 26	7:30 p.m.	No. 13 Washington	Martin Stadium; Pullman, WA (Apple Cup)	ESPN	L 33–51	33,152
December 17	12:30 p.m.	vs. Fresno State*	SoFi Stadium; Inglewood, CA (LA Bowl)	ABC	L 6–29	32,405
*Non-conference game; ^{†}Homecoming; Rankings from AP Poll (and CFP Rankings, after November 1) - Released prior to game; All times are in Pacific time

== Roster ==
2022 Washington State Cougars football team roster
Players
Coaches
Offense

Pos.	#	Name	Class
QB	1	Cam Ward	So
RB	2	Jouvensly Bazil	So
WR	3	Zeriah Beason	So
WR	4	Tsion Nunnally	Fr
WR	5	Lincoln Victor	Jr
WR	6	Donovan Ollie	So
QB	8	Xavier Ward	Fr
WR	9	Renard Bell	GS
QB	10	John Mateer	Fr
WR	12	Robert Ferrel	GS
QB	17	J. P. Zamora	Fr
QB	18	Emmett Brown	Fr
WR	19	Reed Shumpert	Fr
WR	20	Orion Peters	Fr
RB	22	Jaxson Sawyer	Fr
QB	23	Djouvensky Schlenbaker	Fr
TE	24	Cooper Mathers	So
RB	25	Nakia Watson	Jr
WR	26	Anderson Grover	So
RB	28	Kannon Katzer	Fr
RB	29	Jaylen Jenkins	Fr
RB	30	Dylan Paine	Fr
WR	31	Will Eaton	Fr
WR	32	Van Fessler	Fr
WR	35	C. J. Moore	Jr
TE	42	Billy Riviere III	So
OL	50	Eric Wilder	Fr
OL	52	Jarrett Kingston	Jr
OL	53	Jernias Tafia	Fr
OL	55	Kendall Williams	Fr
OL	56	Gauge Machado	Fr
OL	57	Rodrick Tialavea	So
OL	59	Landon Roaten	Fr
OL	60	Quinn McCarthy	So
OL	61	Christian Hilborn	Fr
OL	62	Luke Roaten	Fr
OL	63	Nolan Byng	Fr
OL	65	Brock Dieu	Fr
OL	66	Ma'ake Fifita	So
OL	67	Jonny Lester	Fr
OL	70	Devin Kylany	Fr
OL	71	Jack Wilson	Jr
OL	72	Jakobus Seth	Fr
OL	74	Zack Miller	Fr
OL	76	Grant Stephens	Sr
OL	77	Konner Gomness	So
OL	79	Fa'alili Fa'amoe	Fr
WR	80	Drake Owen	Jr
WR	81	Tre Horner	Fr
TE	82	Cameron Johnson	Jr
WR	83	Cole Pruett	Fr
WR	84	Josh Meredith	Fr
TE	85	Jake Bowen	Fr
TE	86	Moon Ashby	Fr
TE	87	Andre Dollar	Fr
WR	88	De'Zhaun Stribling	So
WR	89	Leyton Smithson	Fr
TE	92	Trenton Olson	So
QB	98	Luke Holcomb	Fr

Defense

Pos.	#	Name	Class
DB	0	Sam Lockett III	Jr
LB	1	Daiyan Henley	Sr
DB	2	Chris Jackson	Jr
DB	3	Armauni Archie	So
DB	3	Kaleb Ford-Dement	GS
DB	5	Derrick Langford Jr.	Sr
DB	6	Chau Smith-Wade	So
DB	10	Ron Stone Jr.	Jr
DB	13	Jordan Lee	Sr
DL	15	Nusi Malani	So
DB	16	Justin Anderson	Fr
LB	18	Buddah Al-Uqdah	Fr
DE	20	Quinn Roff	So
DB	21	Adrian Shepherd	Fr
LB	22	Gavin Barthiel	Fr
DB	23	Javan Robinson	Fr
DB	24	Tony Carter	Fr
DB	25	Jaden Hicks	Fr
DB	26	David Johnson	Fr
LB	27	Hudson Cedarland	Fr
DB	28	Reece Sylvester	Fr
DB	29	Cam Lampkin	Jr
DB	30	Jackson Lataimua	Fr
DB	31	Hunter Escorcia	Fr
DB	32	Tanner Moku	So
DB	33	Henry Kimmins	So
DB	34	Cole Norah	Fr
DB	36	Kasen Kinchen	Fr
DB	39	Leon Neal Jr.	Fr
DB	40	Joseph Taylor	Fr
DB	41	Bryce Grays	Fr
DT	42	Antonio Pule III	Sr
LB	43	Ben Wilson	Sr
DE	44	Gabriel Lopez	Fr
DE	45	Raam Stevenson	Fr
DB	46	Dylan Clinton	Fr
LB	47	Darnell Stephens	Fr
DL	48	Amir Mujahid	Sr
LB	49	Mason Carr	Fr
DE	50	Lawrence Falatea	Fr
LB	51	Francisco Mauigoa	So
LB	52	Kyle Thornton	So
DE	53	Peter Eyabi	Fr
DT	54	Ahmir Crowder	Jr
DT	55	Tristan Souza	So
LB	59	Joshua Erling	Jr
DT	60	David Gusta	Fr
DE	62	Cole Scott	Fr
DE	80	Brennan Jackson	Jr
DT	81	Rashid McKenzie	Fr
LB	82	Travion Brown	So
DT	86	Bryson Lamb	Fr
DE	90	Malachi Ledbetter	Fr
DL	93	Christian Meija	Sr
DE	95	Andrew Edson	So
DE	96	Jack Proctor	Fr
DL	97	Ty Garay-Harris	So
DT	99	Alec Eckert	Fr

Special teams

Pos.	#	Name	Class
K	19	Colton Theaker	Jr
LS	34	Simon Samarzich	Jr
LS	37	Luke Rodarte	Fr
P	38	Nick Haberer	So
K	49	Dean Janikowski	So
K	96	Vincent Gourley	Fr

Head coach

- Jake Dickert

Coordinators/assistant coaches

- Eric Morris – Offensive coordinator/quarterbacks
- Brian Ward – Defensive coordinator/linebackers
- Pete Kaligis – Assistant head coach/defensive tackles
- Nick Whitworth – Special teams coordinator/tight ends
- A. J. Cooper – Run game coordinator/edges
- Mark Atuaia – Running backs
- Ray Brown – Cornerbacks
- Joel Filani – Wide receivers
- Jordan Malone – Safeties
- Clay McGuire – Offensive line
- Dwain Bradshaw – Head strength and conditioning coach
- Jake Beckett – Assistant, strength and conditioning
- Jimmie Bunting – Assistant, strength and conditioning
- Tim Hicks – Assistant, strength and conditioning
- Devante Wilson – Assistant, strength and conditioning
- Jordan Davis – Offensive analyst
- Trent Greene – Defensive analyst
- Justin Mesa – Quality control, offense
- Adam Breske – Quality control, defense
- Dan Ferrigno – Quality control, special teams
- Sean Brophy – Offensive graduate assistant
- Luke Hyde – Offensive graduate assistant
- Max Silver – Offensive graduate assistant
- Jack Ray – Defensive graduate assistant
- Rob Schlaeger – Player personnel coordinator
- Ryan Robinson – Director, football operations
- Ashley Watkins – Assistant director of football operations

Legend

- (C) Team captain
- (S) Suspended
- (I) Ineligible
- Injured
- Redshirt

Roster
Last update: 10/3/22

== Game summaries ==
=== vs Idaho ===
Idaho Vandals (0–0) vs Washington State Cougars (0–0) – Game summary

Quarter	1	2	3	4	Total
Vandals	10	0	0	7	17
Cougars	0	10	7	7	24

at Martin Stadium • Pullman, WA

- Date: September 3, 2022
- Game time: 6:30 p.m.
- Game weather: Sunny, 70 °F (21 °C)
- Game attendance: 25,233
- Referee: Steven Strimling
- TV announcers (Pac-12 Network): J. B. Long (play-by-play), Ryan Leaf (analyst)

Game information

First quarter

- (11:11) IDHO – Marcus Harris 45-yard fumble return, Logan Prescott kick (Drive: 1 play, 3 yards, 0:10; Idaho 7–0)
- (3:28) IDHO – Ricardo Chavez 27-yard field goal (Drive: 11 plays, 69 yards, 6:24; Idaho 10–0)

Second quarter

- (3:13) WSU – Renard Bell 3-yard pass from Cam Ward, Dean Janikowski kick (Drive: 6 plays, 19 yards, 1:28; Idaho 10–7)
- (0:06) WSU – Dean Janikowski 26-yard field goal (Drive: 9 plays, 80 yards, 3:06; Tied 10–10)

Third quarter

- (8:17) WSU – De'Zhaun Stribling 13-yard pass from Cam Ward, Dean Janikowski kick (Drive: 8 plays, 58 yards, 2:29; Washington State 17–10)

Fourth quarter

- (10:33) WSU – Jaylen Jenkins 8-yard pass from Cam Ward, Dean Janikowski kick (Drive: 5 plays, 39 yards, 1:07; Washington State 24–10)
- (6:05) IDHO – Jordan Dwyer 23-yard pass from Gevani McCoy, Ricardo Chavez kick (Drive: 8 plays, 75 yards, 4:28; Washington State 24–17)

Statistics	IDHO	WSU
First downs	13	19
Total yards	273	366
Rushes/yards	34–61	25–138
Passing yards	212	228
Passing: Comp–Att–Int	21–32–2	26–41–0
Time of possession	36:35	23:25

Team	Category	Player	Statistics
Idaho	Passing	Gevani McCoy	21/32, 212 yards, TD, 2 INT
Idaho	Rushing	Anthony Woods	9 carries, 50 yards
Idaho	Receiving	Jermaine Jackson	6 receptions, 113 yards
Washington State	Passing	Cam Ward	26/41, 228 yards, 3 TD
Washington State	Rushing	Nakia Watson	18 carries, 117 yards
Washington State	Receiving	Donovan Ollie	7 receptions, 67 yards

=== at No. 19 Wisconsin ===
Washington State Cougars (1–0) at No. 19 Wisconsin Badgers (1–0) – Game summary

Quarter	1	2	3	4	Total
Cougars	0	7	10	0	17
No. 19 Badgers	0	14	0	0	14

at Camp Randall Stadium • Madison, WI

- Date: September 10, 2022
- Game time: 12:30 p.m. PST
- Game weather: Cloudy, 68 °F (20 °C); Wind at N8 MPH
- Game attendance: 74,001
- Referee: Reggie Smith
- TV announcers (FOX): Jason Benetti (play-by-play), Brock Huard (analyst), Allison Williams (sideline)

Game information

First quarter

None

Second quarter

- (9:10) WSU – Nakia Watson 2-yard run, Dean Janikowski kick (Drive: 4 plays, 53 yards, 1:19; Washington State 7–0)
- (6:05) WISC – Clay Cundiff 17-yard pass from Graham Mertz, Vito Calvaruso kick (Drive: 6 plays, 65 yards, 3:05; Tied 7–7)
- (0:20) WISC – Clay Cundiff 10-yard pass from Graham Mertz, Vito Calvaruso kick (Drive: 5 plays, 45 yards, 0:35; Wisconsin 14–7)

Third quarter

- (11:20) WSU – Dean Janikowski 26-yard field goal (Drive: 7 plays, 18 yards, 3:40; Wisconsin 14–10)
- (5:12) WSU – Nakia Watson 31-yard pass from Cam Ward, Cole Norah kick (Drive: 6 plays, 49 yards, 2:22; Washington State 17–14)

Fourth quarter

None

Statistics	WSU	WISC
First downs	10	22
Total yards	253	401
Rushes/yards	22–53	44–174
Passing yards	200	227
Passing: Comp–Att–Int	17–28–2	18–31–1
Time of possession	21:58	38:02

Team	Category	Player	Statistics
Washington State	Passing	Cam Ward	17/28, 200 yards, TD, 2 INT
Washington State	Rushing	Nakia Watson	10 carries, 33 yards, TD
Washington State	Receiving	Renard Bell	2 receptions, 49 yards
Wisconsin	Passing	Graham Mertz	18/31, 227 yards, 2 TD, INT
Wisconsin	Rushing	Braelon Allen	21 carries, 98 yards
Wisconsin	Receiving	Keontez Lewis	2 receptions, 62 yards

=== vs Colorado State ===
Colorado State Rams (0–2) vs Washington State Cougars (2–0) – Game summary

Quarter	1	2	3	4	Total
Rams	0	0	0	7	7
Cougars	21	7	3	7	38

at Martin Stadium • Pullman, WA

- Date: September 17, 2022
- Game time: 2:00 p.m.
- Game weather: Sunny, 70 °F (21 °C)
- Game attendance: 23,611
- Referee: Kevin Boitmann
- TV announcers (Pac-12 Network): Roxy Bernstein (play-by-play), Lincoln Kennedy (analyst)

Game information

First quarter

- (12:02) WSU – Donovan Ollie 17-yard pass from Cam Ward, Dean Janikowski kick ('Drive: 4 plays, 46 yards, 1:00; Washington State 7–0)
- (9:59) WSU – De'Zhaun Stribling 13-yard pass from Cam Ward, Dean Janikowski kick ('Drive: 5 plays, 52 yards, 1:14; Washington State 14–0)
- (3:24) WSU – De'Zhaun Stribling 19-yard pass from Cam Ward, Dean Janikowski kick ('Drive: 5 plays, 73 yards, 1:58; Washington State 21–0)

Second quarter

- (6:10) WSU – Donovan Ollie 2-yard pass from Cam Ward, Dean Janikowski kick ('Drive: 13 plays, 82 yards, 5:06; Washington State 28–0)

Third quarter

- (13:05) WSU – Dean Janikowski 22-yard field goal ('Drive: 7 plays, 70 yards, 1:51; Washington State 31–0)

Fourth quarter

- (11:07) CSU – Justus Ross-Simmons 14-yard pass from Clay Millen, Michael Boyle kick ('Drive: 10 plays, 70 yards, 4:36; Washington State 31–7)
- (1:07) WSU – Kannon Katzer 1-yard run, Dean Janikowski kick ('Drive: 10 plays, 74 yards, 6:36; Washington State 38–7)

Statistics	CSU	WSU
First downs	14	21
Total yards	249	442
Rushes/yards	31–37	28–143
Passing yards	212	299
Passing: Comp–Att–Int	25–35–1	24–34–1
Time of possession	32:37	27:23

Team	Category	Player	Statistics
Colorado State	Passing	Clay Millen	25/35, 212 yards, TD, INT
Colorado State	Rushing	Avery Morrow	8 carries, 28 yards
Colorado State	Receiving	Ty McCullouch	4 receptions, 57 yards
Washington State	Passing	Cam Ward	24/34, 299 yards, 4 TD, INT
Washington State	Rushing	Nakia Watson	8 carries, 74 yards
Washington State	Receiving	Donovan Ollie	7 receptions, 82 yards, 2 TD

=== vs No. 15 Oregon ===
No. 15 Oregon Ducks (2–1) vs Washington State Cougars (3–0) – Game summary

Quarter	1	2	3	4	Total
No. 15 Ducks	3	6	6	29	44
Cougars	10	7	10	14	41

at Martin Stadium • Pullman, WA

- Date: September 24, 2022
- Game time: 1:00 p.m.
- Game weather: Partly cloudy, 73 °F (23 °C)
- Game attendance: 33,058
- Referee: Mike McCabe
- TV announcers (FOX): Tim Brando (play-by-play), Spencer Tillman (analyst)

Game information

First quarter

- (11:41) WSU – Cam Ward 5-yard run, Dean Janikowski kick (Drive: 8 plays, 75 yards, 3:04; Washington State 7–0)
- (7:36) ORE – Camden Lewis 24-yard field goal (Drive: 8 plays, 69 yards, 3:49; Washington State 7–3)
- (4:31) WSU – Dean Janikowski 38-yard field goal (Drive: 8 plays, 54 yards, 2:42; Washington State 10–3)

Second quarter

- (14:56) ORE – Camden Lewis 28-yard field goal (Drive: 11 plays, 65 yards, 4:24; Washington State 10–6)
- (4:36) WSU – Francis Mauigoa 95-yard interception return, Dean Janikowski kick (Drive: 12 plays, 81 yards, 4:57; Washington State 17–6)
- (1:33) ORE – Camden Lewis 29-yard field goal (Drive: 8 plays, 64 yards, 2:50; Washington State 17–9)

Third quarter

- (14:11) ORE – Bucky Irving 12-yard pass from Bo Nix (Drive: 3 plays, 75 yards, 0:36; Washington State 17–15)
- (8:50) WSU – Dean Janikowski 38-yard field goal (Drive: 12 plays, 54 yards, 5:04; Washington State 20–15)
- (4:16) WSU – De'Zhaun Stribling 15-yard pass from Cam Ward, Dean Janikowski kick (Drive: 6 plays, 62 yards, 2:43; Washington State 27–15)

Fourth quarter

- (14:56) ORE – Jordan James 1-yard pass from Bo Nix, Camden Lewis kick (Drive: 10 plays, 84 yards, 4:02; Washington State 27–22)
- (6:42) WSU – Robert Ferrel 1-yard pass from Cam Ward, Dean Janikowski kick (Drive: 12 plays, 81 yards, 5:19; Washington State 34–22)
- (3:48) ORE – Cam McCormick 1-yard pass from Bo Nix, Camden Lewis kick (Drive: 11 plays, 75 yards, 2:46; Washington State 34–29)
- (1:21) ORE – Troy Franklin 50-yard pass from Bo Nix, Bo Nix two-point run (Drive: 5 plays, 69 yards, 1:00; Oregon 37–34)
- (1:01) ORE – Mase Funa 27-yard interception return, Camden Lewis kick (Drive: 2 plays, 6 yards, 0:03; Oregon 44–34)
- (0:01) WSU – Nakia Watson 1-yard run, Dean Janikowski kick (Drive: 7 plays, 75 yards, 0:49; Oregon 44–41)

Statistics	ORE	WSU
First downs	28	27
Total yards	624	428
Rushes/yards	32–178	25–53
Passing yards	446	375
Passing: Comp–Att–Int	34–45–1	37–48–2
Time of possession	28:58	31:02

Team	Category	Player	Statistics
Oregon	Passing	Bo Nix	33/44, 428 yards, 3 TD, INT
Oregon	Rushing	Bucky Irving	11 carries, 81 yards
Oregon	Receiving	Troy Franklin	5 receptions, 137 yards, TD
Washington State	Passing	Cam Ward	37/48, 375 yards, 2 TD, 2 INT
Washington State	Rushing	Nakia Watson	12 carries, 36 yards, TD
Washington State	Receiving	De'Zhaun Stribling	5 receptions, 84 yards, TD

=== vs California ===
California Golden Bears (3–1) vs Washington State Cougars (3–1) – Game summary

Quarter	1	2	3	4	Total
Golden Bears	0	3	0	6	9
Cougars	0	7	7	14	28

at Martin Stadium • Pullman, WA

- Date: October 1, 2022
- Game time: 2:30 p.m.
- Game weather: Sunny, 70 °F (21 °C)
- Game attendance: 23,021
- Referee: Michael Mothershead
- TV announcers (Pac-12 Network): Roxy Bernstein (play-by-play), Lincoln Kennedy (analyst)

Game information

First quarter

None

Second quarter

- (13:18) WSU – Jaylen Jenkins 2-yard run, Dean Janikowski kick (Drive: 4 plays, 20 yards, 1:29; Washington State 7–0)
- (9:13) CAL – Dario Longhetto 42-yard field goal (Drive: 8 plays, 51 yards, 4:08; Washington State 7–3)

Third quarter

- (13:51) WSU – Robert Ferrel 17-yard pass from Cam Ward, Dean Janikowski kick (Drive: 4 plays, 75 yards, 1:09; Washington State 14–3)

Fourth quarter

- (13:28) CAL – Jaydn Ott 2-yard run (Drive: 7 plays, 90 yards, 2:50; Washington State 14–9)
- (12:00) WSU – Renard Bell 37-yard pass from Cam Ward, Dean Janikowski kick (Drive: 4 plays, 75 yards, 1:28; Washington State 21–9)
- (6:19) WSU – Billy Riviere III 11-yard pass from Cam Ward, Dean Janikowski kick (Drive: 9 plays, 67 yards, 3:47; Washington State 28–9)

Statistics	CAL	WSU
First downs	13	21
Total yards	311	415
Rushes/yards	25–32	25–72
Passing yards	279	343
Passing: Comp–Att–Int	24–37–0	27–40–0
Time of possession	31:31	28:29

Team	Category	Player	Statistics
California	Passing	Jack Plummer	23/33, 272 yards
California	Rushing	Jaydn Ott	17 carries, 70 yards, TD
California	Receiving	Jeremiah Hunter	6 receptions, 109 yards
Washington State	Passing	Cam Ward	27/40, 343 yards, 3 TD, INT
Washington State	Rushing	Nakia Watson	14 carries, 52 yards
Washington State	Receiving	Renard Bell	8 receptions, 115 yards, TD

=== at No. 6 USC ===
Washington State Cougars (4–1) at No. 6 USC Trojans (5–0) – Game summary

Quarter	1	2	3	4	Total
Cougars	0	14	0	0	14
No. 6 Trojans	10	7	7	3	27

at Los Angeles Memorial Coliseum • Los Angeles, CA

- Date: October 8, 2022
- Game time: 4:30 p.m.
- Game weather: Clear, 80 °F (27 °C)
- Game attendance: 63,204
- Referee: Francisco Villar
- TV announcers (FOX): Noah Eagle (play-by-play), Mark Helfrich (analyst)

Game information

First quarter

- (8:31) USC – Mario Williams 38-yard pass from Caleb Williams, Denis Lynch kick (Drive: 8 plays, 82 yards, 3:32; USC 7–0)
- (3:32) USC – Denis Lynch 31-yard field goal (Drive: 7 plays, 46 yards, 2:50; USC 10–0)

Second quarter

- (14:56) WSU – Robert Ferrel 12-yard pass from Cam Ward, Dean Janikowski kick (Drive: 8 plays, 92 yards, 3:36; USC 10–7)
- (11:48) WSU – Nakia Watson 1-yard pass from Cam Ward, Dean Janikowski kick (Drive: 5 plays, 75 yards, 1:49; Washington State 14–10)
- (2:10) USC – Travis Dye 4-yard run, Denis Lynch kick (Drive: 11 plays, 75 yards, 6:19; USC 17–14)

Third quarter

- (5:17) USC – Mario Williams 24-yard pass from Caleb Williams, Denis Lynch kick (Drive: 5 plays, 62 yards, 2:24; USC 24–14)

Fourth quarter

- (9:09) USC – Denis Lynch 27-yard field goal (Drive: 13 plays, 70 yards, 7:27; USC 27–14)
- (2:08) USC – Denis Lynch 31-yard field goal (Drive: 11 plays, 51 yards, 5:21; USC 30–14)

Statistics	WSU	USC
First downs	17	23
Total yards	316	369
Rushes/yards	29–144	40–181
Passing yards	172	188
Passing: Comp–Att–Int	19–32–0	15–29–0
Time of possession	27:12	32:48

Team	Category	Player	Statistics
Washington State	Passing	Cam Ward	19/32, 172 yards, 2 TD
Washington State	Rushing	Jaylen Jenkins	13 carries, 130 yards
Washington State	Receiving	Jaylen Jenkins	2 receptions, 54 yards
USC	Passing	Caleb Williams	15/29, 188 yards, 2 TD
USC	Rushing	Travis Dye	28 carries, 149 yards, TD
USC	Receiving	Mario Williams	4 receptions, 82 yards, 2 TD

=== at Oregon State ===
Washington State Cougars (4–2) at Oregon State Beavers (4–2) – Game summary

Quarter	1	2	3	4	Total
Cougars	0	3	7	0	10
Beavers	7	3	7	7	24

at Reser Stadium • Corvallis, OR

- Date: October 15, 2022
- Game time: 6:00 p.m.
- Game weather: Sunny, 79 °F (26 °C)
- Game attendance: 28,735
- Referee: Steven Strimling
- TV announcers (Pac-12 Network): Roxy Bernstein (play-by-play), Lincoln Kennedy (analyst)

Game information
'First quarter
- (10:33) ORST – Jack Colletto 1-yard run, Atticus Sappington kick (Drive: 8 plays, 40 yards, 4:27; Oregon State 7–0)

Second quarter

- (14:00) ORST – Atticus Sappington 26-yard field goal (Drive: 12 plays, 87 yards, 5:35; Oregon State 10–0)
- (9:20) WSU – Dean Janikowski 29-yard field goal (Drive: 12 plays, 72 yards, 4:34;Oregon State 10–3)

Third quarter

- (8:01) ORST – Anthony Gould 17-yard pass from Ben Gulbranson, Atticus Sappington kick (Drive: 11 plays, 74 yards, 5:34;Oregon State 17–3)
- (4:15) WSU – Jaylen Jenkins 9-yard pass from Cam Ward, Dean Janikowski kick (Drive: 7 plays, 81 yards, 3:41; Oregon State 17–10)

Fourth quarter

- (14:57) ORST – Jack Colletto 2-yard run, Atticus Sappington kick (Drive: 8 plays, 75 yards, 4:18; Oregon State 24–10)

Statistics	WSU	ORST
First downs	18	21
Total yards	368	344
Rushes/yards	20–23	47–203
Passing yards	345	141
Passing: Comp–Att–Int	25–54–1	12–24–1
Time of possession	25:05	34:55

Team	Category	Player	Statistics
Washington State	Passing	Cam Ward	25/54, 345 yards, TD, INT
Washington State	Rushing	Jaylen Jenkins	6 carries, 42 yards
Washington State	Receiving	Robert Ferrel	5 receptions, 131 yards
Oregon State	Passing	Ben Gulbranson	12/24, 141 yards, TD, INT
Oregon State	Rushing	Damien Martinez	16 carries, 111 yards
Oregon State	Receiving	Jack Velling	4 receptions, 63 yards

=== vs No. 14 Utah ===
No. 14 Utah Utes (5–2) vs Washington State Cougars (4–3) – Game summary

Quarter	1	2	3	4	Total
No. 14 Utes	0	14	7	0	21
Cougars	0	7	0	10	17

at Martin Stadium • Pullman, WA

- Date: October 27, 2022
- Game time: 7:00 p.m.
- Game weather: Rainy, 45 °F (7 °C)
- Game attendance: 21,179
- Referee: Francisco Villar
- TV announcers (FS1): Jeff Levering (play-by-play), Petros Papadakis (analyst)

Game information

First quarter

None

Second quarter

- (13:24) WSU – De'Zhaun Stribling 29-yard pass from Cam Ward, Dean Janikowski kick (Drive: 6 plays, 61 yards, 2:01; Washington State 7–0)
- (9:23) UTAH – Ja'Quinden Jackson 6-yard run, Jadon Redding kick (Drive: 7 plays, 65 yards, 4:01; Tied 7–7)
- (0:20) UTAH – Jaylon Glover 1-yard run, Jadon Redding kick (Drive: 8 plays, 25 yards, 2:27; Utah 14–7)

Third quarter

- (1:24) UTAH – Dalton Kincaid 5-yard pass from Bryson Barnes, Jadon Redding kick (Drive: 7 plays, 60 yards, 4:00; Utah 21–7)

Fourth quarter

- (14:17) WSU – Cam Ward 7-yard run, Jadon Redding kick (Drive: 6 plays, 72 yards, 1:53; Utah 21–14)
- (4:48) WSU – Dean Janikowski 42-yard field goal (Drive: 7 plays, 12 yards, 3:13; Utah 21–17)

Statistics	UTAH	WSU
First downs	19	14
Total yards	344	264
Rushes/yards	42–169	19–42
Passing yards	175	222
Passing: Comp–Att–Int	17–27–0	27–31–0
Time of possession	35:07	24:53

Team	Category	Player	Statistics
Utah	Passing	Bryson Barnes	17/27, 175 yards, TD
Utah	Rushing	Jaylon Glover	20 carries, 76 yards, TD
Utah	Receiving	Dalton Kincaid	7 receptions, 56 yards, TD
Washington State	Passing	Cam Ward	27/31, 222 yards, TD
Washington State	Rushing	Cam Ward	12 carries, 28 yards, TD
Washington State	Receiving	De'Zhaun Stribling	4 receptions, 66 yards, TD

=== at Stanford ===
Washington State Cougars (4–4) at Stanford Cardinal (3–5) – Game summary

Quarter	1	2	3	4	Total
Cougars	21	21	3	7	52
Cardinal	7	0	7	0	14

at Stanford Stadium • Stanford, CA

- Date: November 5, 2022
- Game time: 12:30 p.m.
- Game weather: Cloudy, 59 °F (15 °C)
- Game attendance: 26,515
- Referee: Mark Duddy
- TV announcers (Pac-12 Network): Roxy Bernstein (play-by-play), Michael Bumpus (analyst)

Game information

First quarter

- (12:48) WSU – Leyton Smithson 3-yard run, Dean Janikowski kick (Drive: 6 plays, 80 yards, 2:07; Washington State 7–0)
- (9:29) WSU – Anderson Grover 7-yard pass from Cam Ward, Dean Janikowski kick (Drive: 8 plays, 55 yards, 2:24; Washington State 14–0)
- (6:27) WSU – Cam Ward 15-yard run, Dean Janikowski kick (Drive: 6 plays, 75 yards, 1:28; Washington State 21–0)
- (3:42) STAN – Ashton Daniels 1-yard run, Joshua Karty kick (Drive: 7 plays, 68 yards, 2:38; Washington State 21–7)

Second quarter

- (8:06) WSU – Jaden Hicks 17-yard fumble return, Dean Janikowski kick (Drive: 2 plays, 12 yards, 0:31; Washington State 28–7)
- (2:03) WSU – Donovan Ollie 9-yard pass from Cam Ward, Dean Janikowski kick (Drive: 11 plays, 62 yards, 4:11; Washington State 35–7)
- (0:59) WSU – Nakia Watson 41-yard run, Dean Janikowski kick (Drive: 1 play, 41 yards, 0:08; Washington State 42–7)

Third quarter

- (11:53) STAN – Ashton Daniels 2-yard run, Joshua Karty kick (Drive: 7 plays, 74 yards, 3:02; Washington State 42–14)
- (5:43) WSU – Dean Janikowski 22-yard field goal (Drive: 5 plays, 31 yards, 2:13; Washington State 45–14)

Fourth quarter

- (11:17) WSU – Orion Peters 27-yard pass from John Mateer, Dean Janikowski kick (Drive: 4 plays, 54 yards, 2:13; Washington State 52–14)

Statistics	WSU	STAN
First downs	25	19
Total yards	514	337
Rushes/yards	38–306	28–71
Passing yards	208	266
Passing: Comp–Att–Int	18–34–0	25–42–0
Time of possession	30:11	29:49

Team	Category	Player	Statistics
Washington State	Passing	Cam Ward	16/32, 176 yards, 2 TD
Washington State	Rushing	Nakia Watson	16 carries, 166 yards, TD
Washington State	Receiving	Orion Peters	3 receptions, 50 yards, TD
Stanford	Passing	Tanner McKee	23/40, 236 yards
Stanford	Rushing	Mitch Leigber	11 carries, 23 yards
Stanford	Receiving	Benjamin Yurosek	8 receptions, 90 yards

=== vs Arizona State ===
Arizona State Sun Devils (3–6) vs Washington State Cougars (5–4) – Game summary

Quarter	1	2	3	4	Total
Sun Devils	0	0	6	12	18
Cougars	13	15	0	0	28

at Martin Stadium • Pullman, WA

- Date: November 12, 2022
- Game time: 12:30 p.m.
- Game weather: Sunny, 38 °F (3 °C)
- Game attendance: 24,039
- Referee: Chris Coyte
- TV announcers (Pac-12 Network): Roxy Bernstein (play-by-play), Lincoln Kennedy (analyst)

Game information

First quarter

- (6:31) WSU – Nakia Watson 2-yard run, Dean Janikowski kick (Drive: 9 plays, 39 yards, 3:02; Washington State 7–0)
- (3:59) WSU – Leyton Smithson 2-yard pass from Cam Ward (Drive: 7 plays, 84 yards, 1:41; Washington State 13–0)

Second quarter

- (7:43) WSU – Nakia Watson 5-yard run, Cam Ward two-point pass to Leyton Smithson (Drive: 2 plays, 4 yards, 0:30; Washington State 21–0)
- (0:03) WSU – Nakia Watson 2-yard run, Dean Janikowski kick (Drive: 13 plays, 75 yards, 3:08; Washington State 28–0)

Third quarter

- (0:51) ASU – Jalin Conyers 47-yard pass from Emory Jones (Drive: 4 plays, 52 yards, 1:09; Washington State 28–6)

Fourth quarter

- (4:10) ASU – Xazavian Valladay 1-yard run (Drive: 4 plays, 43 yards, 1:24; Washington State 28–12)
- (0:57) ASU – Elijhah Badger 9-yard pass from Emory Jones (Drive: 5 plays, 63 yards, 1:20; Washington State 28–18)

Statistics	ASU	WSU
First downs	18	19
Total yards	333	356
Rushes/yards	34–121	35–137
Passing yards	212	219
Passing: Comp–Att–Int	18–33–1	22–37–0
Time of possession	33:13	26:47

Team	Category	Player	Statistics
Arizona State	Passing	Emory Jones	15/23, 186 yards, 2 TD
Arizona State	Rushing	Xazavian Valladay	21 carries, 134 yards, TD
Arizona State	Receiving	Xazavian Valladay	6 receptions, 55 yards
Washington State	Passing	Cam Ward	22/37, 219 yards, 2 TD
Washington State	Rushing	Nakia Watson	20 carries, 116 yards, 3 TD
Washington State	Receiving	De'Zhaun Stribling	5 receptions, 64 yards

=== at Arizona ===
Washington State Cougars (6–4) at Arizona Wildcats (4–6) – Game summary

Quarter	1	2	3	4	Total
Cougars	7	14	10	0	31
Wildcats	0	6	0	14	20

at Arizona Stadium • Tucson, AZ

- Date: November 19, 2022
- Game time: 11:00 a.m.
- Game weather: Sunny, 67 °F (19 °C)
- Game attendance: 40,717
- Referee: Francisco Villar
- TV announcers (Pac-12 Network): Jordan Kent (play-by-play), Max Browne (analyst)

Game information

First quarter

- (11:31) WSU – Nakia Watson 4-yard pass from Cam Ward, Dean Janikowski kick (Drive: 11 plays, 75 yards, 3:29; Washington State 7–0)

Second quarter

- (9:06) WSU – Cam Ward 17-yard run, Dean Janikowski kick (Drive: 7 plays, 60 yards, 2:45; Washington State 14–0)
- (6:38) ARIZ – Tyler Loop 38-yard field goal (Drive: 7 plays, 54 yards, 2:28; Washington State 14–3)
- (1:27) WSU – Nakia Watson 2-yard run, Dean Janikowski kick (Drive: 12 plays, 63 yards, 5:04; Washington State 21–3)
- (0:30) ARIZ – Tyler Loop 47-yard field goal (Drive: 7 plays, 45 yards, 0:57; Washington State 21–6)

Third quarter

- (4:45) WSU – Dean Janikowski 23-yard field goal (Drive: 6 plays, 13 yards, 2:20; Washington State 24–6)
- (4:09) WSU – Derrick Langford Jr. 35-yard interception return, Dean Janikowski kick (Drive: 2 plays, 3 yards, 0:36; Washington State 31–6)

Fourth quarter

- (10:41) ARIZ – Jayden de Laura 11-yard run, Tyler Loop kick (Drive: 8 plays, 66 yards, 2:41; Washington State 31–13)
- (1:16) ARIZ – Dorian Singer 47-yard pass from Jayden de Laura, Tyler Loop kick (Drive: 4 plays, 86 yards, 0:51; Washington State 31–20)

Statistics	WSU	ARIZ
First downs	22	19
Total yards	354	441
Rushes/yards	37–161	22–84
Passing yards	193	357
Passing: Comp–Att–Int	25–36–0	28–46–4
Time of possession	33:00	27:00

Team	Category	Player	Statistics
Washington State	Passing	Cam Ward	25/36, 193 yards, TD
Washington State	Rushing	Cam Ward	8 carries, 59 yards, TD
Washington State	Receiving	Donovan Ollie	3 receptions, 53 yards
Arizona	Passing	Jayden de Laura	28/46, 357 yards, TD, 4 INT
Arizona	Rushing	Michael Wiley	7 carries, 50 yards
Arizona	Receiving	Dorian Singer	9 receptions, 176 yards, TD

=== vs No. 13 Washington ===
No. 13 Washington Huskies (9–2) vs Washington State Cougars (7–4) – Game summary

Quarter	1	2	3	4	Total
No. 13 Huskies	7	21	7	16	51
Cougars	10	17	6	0	33

at Martin Stadium • Pullman, WA

- Date: November 26, 2022
- Game time: 7:30 p.m.
- Game weather: Sunny, 32 °F (0 °C)
- Game attendance: 33,152
- Referee: Matthew Richards
- TV announcers (ESPN): Clay Matvick (play-by-play), Rocky Boiman (analyst), Dawn Davenport (sideline)

Game information

First quarter

- (12:18) WSU – Dean Janikowski 50-yard field goal (Drive: 8 plays, 42 yards, 2:42; Washington State 3–0)
- (5:23) WASH – Ja'Lynn Polk 26-yard pass from Michael Penix Jr., Peyton Henry kick (Drive: 4 plays, 44 yards, 1:37; Washington 7–3)
- (0:53) WSU – Cam Ward 14-yard run, Dean Janikowski kick (Drive: 11 plays, 75 yards, 4:30; Washington State 10–7)

Second quarter

- (13:27) WASH – Rome Odunze 47-yard pass from Michael Penix Jr., Peyton Henry kick (Drive: 7 plays, 79 yards, 2:20; Washington State 14–10)
- (11:05) WSU – Robert Ferrel 34-yard pass from Cam Ward, Dean Janikowski kick (Drive: 8 plays, 70 yards, 2:18; Washington State 17–14)
- (9:41) WASH – Michael Penix Jr. 30-yard run, Peyton Henry kick (Drive: 4 plays, 75 yards, 1:24; Washington 21–17)
- (5:07) WSU – Nakia Watson 15-yard pass from Cam Ward, Dean Janikowski kick (Drive: 10 plays, 70 yards, 4:29; Washington State 24–21)
- (1:40) WASH – Michael Penix Jr. 4-yard run, Peyton Henry kick (Drive: 8 plays, 83 yards, 3:22; Washington 28–24)
- (0:00) WSU – Dean Janikowski 29-yard field goal (Drive: 12 plays, 63 yards, 1:40; Washington 28–27)

Third quarter

- (14:50) WASH – Jalen McMillan 75-yard pass from Michael Penix Jr., Peyton Henry kick (Drive: 1 play, 75 yards, 0:10; Washington 35–27)
- (6:30) WSU – Nakia Watson 4-yard run (Drive: 9 plays, 58 yards, 4:36; Washington 35–33)

Fourth quarter

- (14:30) WASH – Rome Odunze 5-yard run (Drive: 5 plays, 72 yards, 1:23; Washington 41–33)
- (5:02) WASH – Peyton Henry 20-yard field goal (Drive: 15 plays, 94 yards, 6:09; Washington 44–33)
- (1:28) WASH – Wayne Taulapapa 40-yard run, Peyton Henry kick (Drive: 3 plays, 57 yards, 0:57; Washington 51–33)

Statistics	WASH	WSU
First downs	30	28
Total yards	703	433
Rushes/yards	24–218	36–75
Passing yards	485	358
Passing: Comp–Att–Int	25–43–1	34–53–0
Time of possession	26:32	33:28

Team	Category	Player	Statistics
Washington	Passing	Michael Penix Jr.	25/43, 485 yards, 3 TD, INT
Washington	Rushing	Wayne Taulapapa	13 carries, 126 yards, TD
Washington	Receiving	Rome Odunze	5 receptions, 157 yards, TD
Washington State	Passing	Cam Ward	33/52, 322 yards, 2 TD
Washington State	Rushing	Nakia Watson	15 carries, 73 yards, TD
Washington State	Receiving	Robert Ferrel	4 receptions, 71 yards, TD

=== vs Fresno State (LA Bowl) ===
Fresno State Bulldogs (9–4) vs Washington State Cougars (7–5) – Game summary
(2022 LA Bowl)

Quarter	1	2	3	4	Total
Cougars	0	0	6	0	6
Bulldogs	7	9	6	7	29

at SoFi Stadium • Inglewood, California

- Date: December 17, 2022
- Game time: 12:30 p.m.
- Game weather: Sunny, 66 °F (19 °C)
- Game attendance: 32,405
- Referee: Lee Hedrick
- TV announcers (ABC): Joe Tessitore (play-by-play), Greg McElroy (color), Molly McGrath (sideline)

Game information

First quarter

- (11:54) FRES – Zane Pope 22-yard pass from Jake Haener, Abraham Montano kick (Drive: 6 plays, 75 yards, 3:06; Fresno State 7–0)

Second quarter

- (12:52) FRES – Jordan Mims 4-yard run, Andre Meono kick (Drive: 4 plays, 23 yards, 2:00; Fresno State 14–0)
- (11:14) FRES – Team safety (Fresno State 16–0)

Third quarter

- (12:52) WSU – Nakia Watson 1-yard run (Drive: 9 plays, 60 yards, 4:48; Fresno State 16–6)
- (0:36) FRES – Nikko Remigio 11-yard pass from Jake Haener (Drive: 6 plays, 75 yards, 3:04; Fresno State 22–6)

Fourth quarter

- (8:29) FRES – Jordan Mims 2-yard run, Abraham Montano kick (Drive: 8 plays, 38 yards, 4:42; Fresno State 29–6)

Statistics	FRES	WSU
First downs	27	13
Total yards	501	182
Rushes/yards	32–221	28–45
Passing yards	280	137
Passing: Comp–Att–Int	24–36–0	22–32–1
Time of possession	32:43	27:17

Team	Category	Player	Statistics
Fresno State	Passing	Jake Haener	24/36, 280 yards, 2 TD
Fresno State	Rushing	Jordan Mims	18 carries, 209 yards, 2 TD
Fresno State	Receiving	Nikko Remigio	5 receptions, 84 yards, TD
Washington State	Passing	Cam Ward	22/32, 137 yards, INT
Washington State	Rushing	Nakia Watson	14 carries, 33 yards, TD
Washington State	Receiving	Robert Ferrel	10 receptions, 66 yards

== Awards ==
Player	Award	Date
Renard Bell	Pac-12 Special Teams Player of the Week	September 12, 2022
Jarrett Kingston	Pac-12 Offensive Lineman of the Week	September 12, 2022
Daiyan Henley	Pac-12 Defensive Player of the Week	September 19, 2022
Jaylen Jenkins	Pac-12 Freshman of the Week	October 10, 2022
Jaden Hicks	Pac-12 Freshman of the Week	November 7, 2022
Brennan Jackson	Pac-12 Defensive Lineman of the Week	November 14, 2022

== Staff ==
Name	Position	Seasons at Washington State	Alma mater
Jake Dickert	Head coach	3	Wisconsin–Stevens Point (2007)
Brian Ward	Defensive coordinator / Linebackers	1	McPherson (2001)
Pete Kaligis	Assistant head coach / defensive tackles	1	Washington (1994)
A. J. Cooper	Edges / defensive run game coordinator	3	North Dakota State (2006)
Ray Brown	Cornerbacks	1	East Central (2009)
Jordan Malone	Safeties / Nickels	3	Minnesota State (2006)
Eric Morris	Offensive coordinator / quarterbacks	1	Texas Tech (2008)
Clay McGuire	Offensive line	6	Texas Tech (2004)
Mark Atuaia	Running backs	1	BYU (1996)
Joel Filani	Wide receivers	1	Texas Tech (2006)
Nick Whitworth	Tight ends / special teams coordinator	1	Idaho State (2001)
Dwain Bradshaw	Head strength and conditioning coach	3	Arizona State
Brent Vernon	Chief of Staff	1	Mizzou (2008)

== Rankings ==
Ranking movements Legend: ██ Increase in ranking ██ Decrease in ranking — = Not ranked RV = Received votes
	Week															
Poll	Pre	1	2	3	4	5	6	7	8	9	10	11	12	13	14	Final
AP	—	—	—	RV	RV	RV	RV	RV								
Coaches	—	—	—	RV	RV	RV	RV	RV								
CFP	Not released															Not released
