= 2023 Rose Bowl =

Postseason college football bowl game

2023 Rose Bowl presented by Prudential
- CFP New Year's Six; 109th Rose Bowl Game
Penn State Nittany Lions	Utah Utes
(10–2)	(10–3)
Big Ten	Pac-12
35	21
Head coach: James Franklin	Head coach: Kyle Whittingham
AP / Coaches / CFP; 9 / 7 / 11	AP / Coaches / CFP; 7 / 10 / 8
	1	2	3	4	Total
Penn State	7	7	7	14	35
Utah	0	14	0	7	21
- Date: January 2, 2023
- Season: 2022
- Stadium: Rose Bowl
- Location: Pasadena, California
- MVP: Sean Clifford (QB, Penn State) & Ji'Ayir Brown (S, Penn State)
- Favorite: Penn State by 1.5
- National anthem: University of Utah Marching Band
- Referee: Michael Vandervelde (Big 12)
- Halftime show: Pennsylvania State University Marching Blue Band and University of Utah Marching Band
- Attendance: 94,873

United States TV coverage
- Network: ESPN
- Announcers: Chris Fowler (play-by-play), Kirk Herbstreit (analyst), and Holly Rowe (sideline)

International TV coverage
- Network: ESPN Deportes; ESPN Brazil
- Announcers: ESPN Brazil: Thiago Alves (play-by-play) and Weinny Eirado (analyst); ESPN Deportes: Guillermo Celis (play-by-play) and Kenneth Garay (analyst)

The 2023 Rose Bowl was a college football bowl game played on January 2, 2023, at the Rose Bowl in Pasadena, California. The 109th annual Rose Bowl, the game featured Penn State from the Big Ten Conference and Utah from the Pac-12 Conference. The game began at 2:11 p.m. PST and was aired on ESPN and ESPN Radio. It was one of the 2022–23 bowl games concluding the 2022 FBS football season. Sponsored by Prudential Financial, the game is officially known as The Rose Bowl Game presented by Prudential.

This game was the final Rose Bowl with its conference tie in of Pac 12 vs Big Ten before the expansion of the College Football Playoff to 12 teams in 2024 (2025 Calendar year) and hosting the final four team playoff semifinal in 2023 (2024 Calendar year).

Induction ceremonies to the Rose Bowl Hall of Fame were held before the game honoring three-time Rose Bowl Game head coach Hugo Bezdek (1884–1952), recently retired Rose Bowl Stadium CEO Darryl Dunn, 1977 Rose Bowl Game MVP Vince Evans (USC), and 1987 All-American Lorenzo White (Michigan State).

== Teams ==
Based on conference tie-ins, the game featured Big Ten Conference team Penn State and Pac-12 Conference champion Utah. Utah earned their spot by defeating #4 USC in the Pac-12 Championship by a score of 47–24 on December 2. Penn State earned their spot after Ohio State and Michigan made it to the College Football Playoff. This was Utah's second consecutive Rose Bowl, with an appearance in last year's edition against the Ohio State Buckeyes, while this was Penn State's 5th overall Rose Bowl game, most recently playing in the 2017 edition against the USC Trojans.

This game marked the Nittany Lions' 100th anniversary of their first Rose Bowl Game. They were defeated by Southern California 14–3 on January 1, 1923. This was the first time Utah and Penn State had ever played each other.

=== Penn State Nittany Lions ===
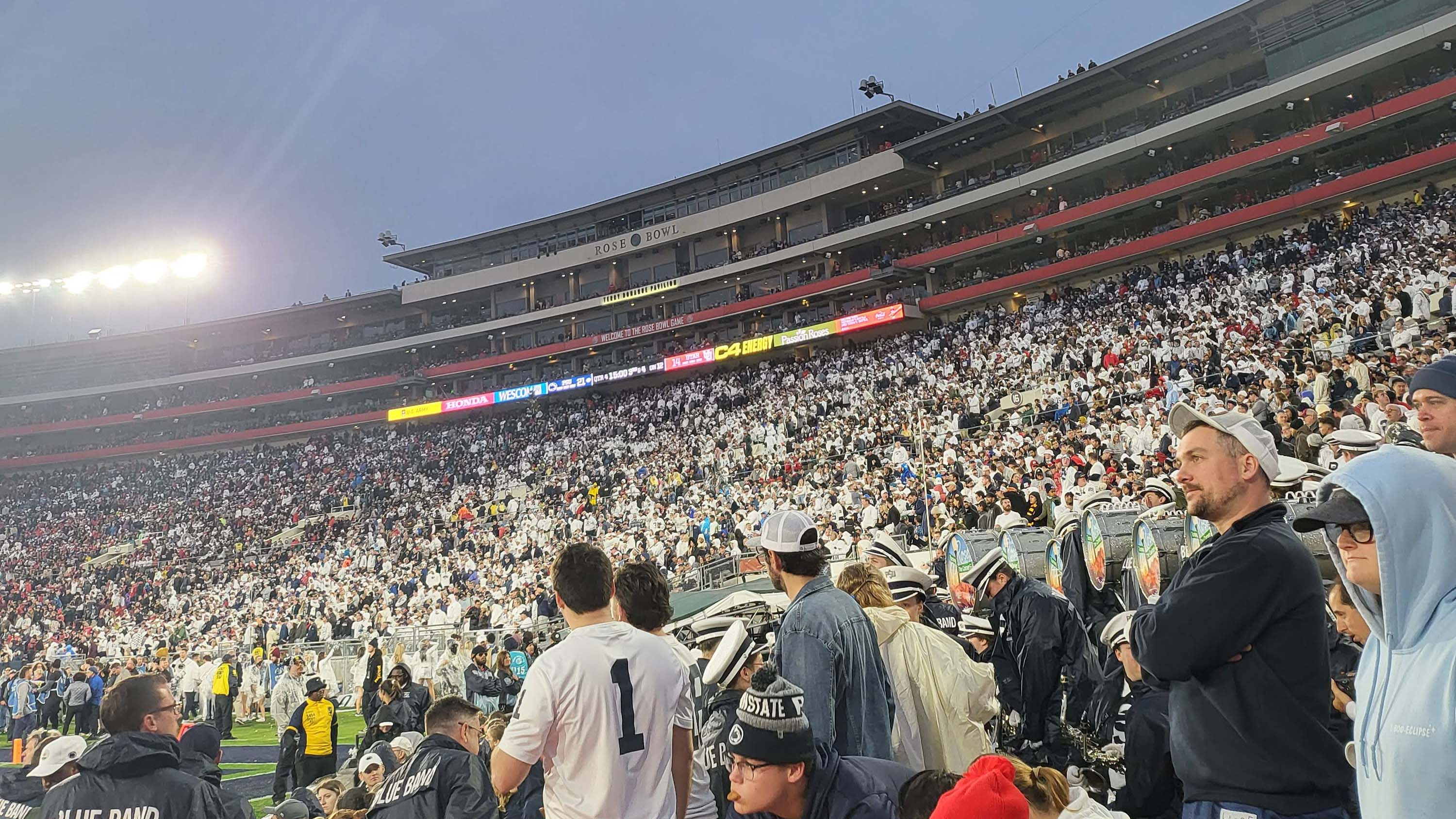
The Penn State section at the 2023 Rose Bowl.

The Nittany Lions earned their 5th overall Rose Bowl bid after they finished the regular season as the 3rd highest ranked team from the Big Ten Conference. The two higher ranked teams in the Big Ten, Michigan and Ohio State, both reached the College Football Playoff, giving the Nittany Lions the trip to Pasadena. Penn State finished their regular season with an overall 10–2 record, 7–2 in Big Ten play. Their losses came to Michigan and Ohio State in the 7th and 9th weeks of the regular season, respectively.

=== Utah Utes ===
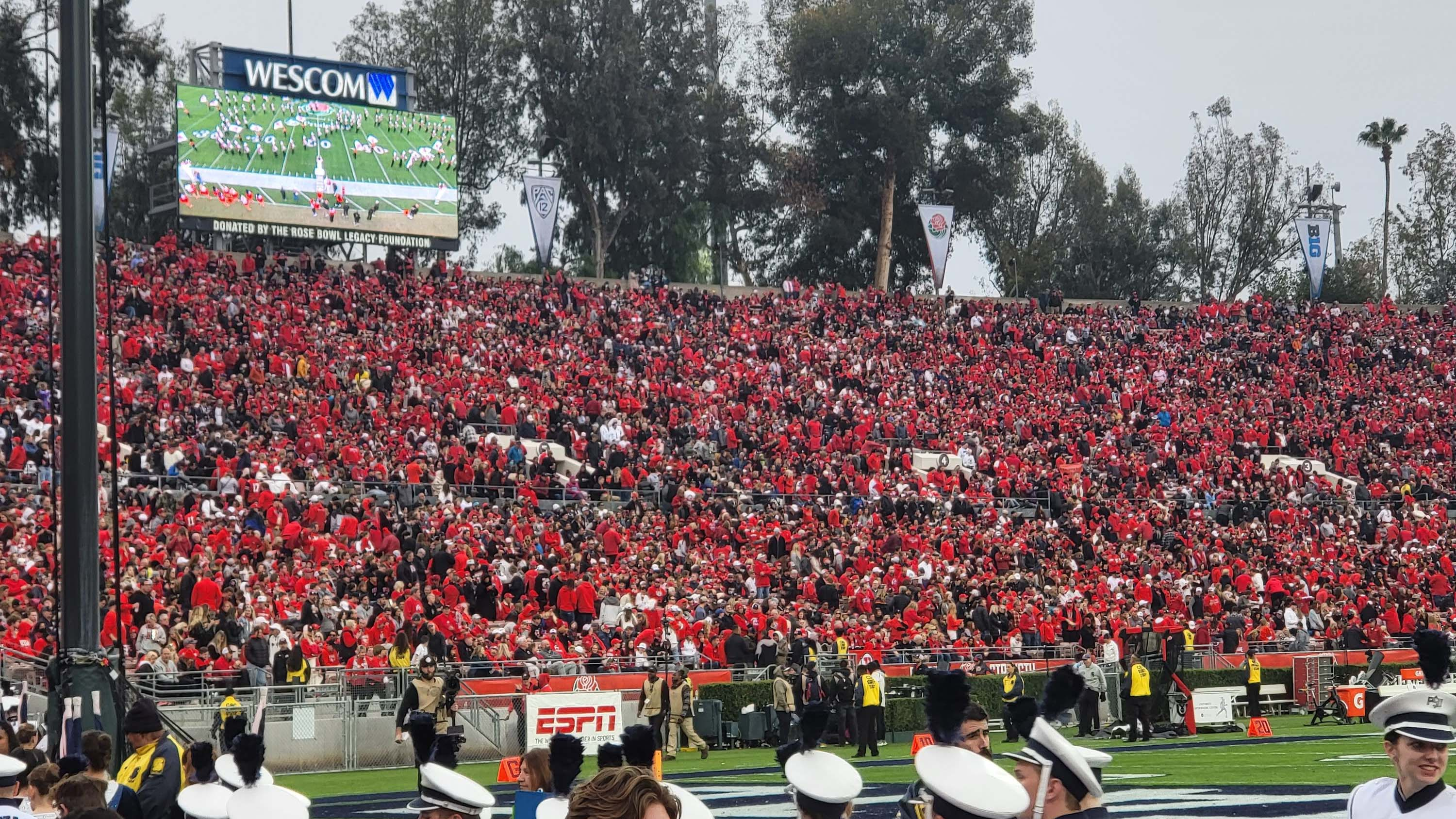
The Utah section at the 2023 Rose Bowl.

After winning their second-straight Pac-12 championship, this was the second consecutive Rose Bowl appearance for the Utes, who lost to Ohio State in the 2022 edition. Utah finished their regular season with a 9–3 overall record, 7–2 in Pac-12 play. Their losses came to Florida, UCLA (in the same stadium), and Oregon. The Utes faced USC in the Pac-12 Championship, a rematch between the teams. Utah had defeated USC on October 15 by a 43–42 score (USC's only regular season loss), and defeated them again for the Pac-12 title, 47–24. The Utes entered the Rose Bowl with an overall 10–3 record.

== Game summary ==
2023 Rose Bowl Game presented by Prudential

Quarter	1	2	3	4	Total
No. 11 Penn State	7	7	7	14	35
No. 8 Utah	0	14	0	7	21

at Rose Bowl • Pasadena, California

- Date: Monday, January 2, 2023
- Game time: 2:00 p.m. PST
- Game weather: Cloudy • Temperature: 54 °F (12 °C) • Wind: 2 mph (3.2 km/h) northwest
- Game attendance: 94,873
- Referee: Michael Vandervelde
- TV announcers (ESPN): Chris Fowler (play-by-play), Kirk Herbstreit (analyst), and Holly Rowe (sideline)
- Box score

Scoring summary

Quarter	Time	Drive			Team	Scoring information	Score	
Quarter	Time	Plays	Yards	TOP	Team	Scoring information	Penn State	Utah
1	0:07	11	82	4:51	Penn State	Nicholas Singleton 5-yard touchdown run, Jake Pinegar kick good	7	0
2	7:55	13	75	7:12	Utah	Thomas Yassmin 1-yard touchdown reception from Cameron Rising, Jordan Noyes kick good	7	7
2	4:47	6	70	3:08	Penn State	Mitchell Tinsley 10-yard touchdown reception from Sean Clifford, Jake Pinegar kick good	14	7
2	2:38	6	75	2:09	Utah	Ja'Quinden Jackson 19-yard touchdown run, Jordan Noyes kick good	14	14
3	9:25	3	95	0:52	Penn State	Nicholas Singleton 87-yard touchdown run, Jake Pinegar kick good	21	14
4	14:49	3	94	1:29	Penn State	KeAndre Lambert-Smith 88-yard touchdown reception from Sean Clifford, Jake Pinegar kick good	28	14
4	10:36	5	47	2:44	Penn State	Kaytron Allen 1-yard touchdown run, Jake Pinegar kick good	35	14
4	0:25	8	78	1:47	Utah	Jaylen Dixon 5-yard touchdown reception from Bryson Barnes, Jordan Noyes kick good	35	21
"TOP" = time of possession. For other American football terms, see Glossary of American football.							35	21

== Statistics ==
Team statistical comparison
Statistic	Penn State	Utah
First downs	14	23
First downs rushing	5	12
First downs passing	9	9
First downs penalty	0	2
Third down efficiency	7–13	11–19
Fourth down efficiency	0–1	1–2
Total plays–net yards	54–448	83–391
Rushing attempts–net yards	31–169	43–184
Yards per rush	5.5	4.3
Yards passing	279	207
Pass completions–attempts	16–22	18–40
Interceptions thrown	0	2
Punt returns–total yards	2–4	0–0
Kickoff returns–total yards	3–68	1–15
Punts–average yardage	5–46.4	5–40.8
Fumbles–lost	0–0	0–0
Penalties–yards	3–33	4–25
Time of possession	24:47	35:13

Penn State statistics
Nittany Lions passing
	C–A	Yds	TD–INT
Sean Clifford	16–21	279	2–0
Drew Allar	0–1	0	0–0
Nittany Lions rushing
	Car	Yds	TD
Nicholas Singleton	7	120	2
Kaytron Allen	11	37	1
Tank Smith	4	15	0
Sean Clifford	8	-1	0
TEAM	1	-2	0
Nittany Lions receiving
	Rec	Yds	TD
KeAndre Lambert-Smith	3	124	1
Mitchell Tinsley	6	49	1
Harrison Wallace III	2	47	0
Theo Johnson	1	28	0
Kaytron Allen	3	16	0
Tyler Warren	1	15	0

Utah statistics
Utes passing
	C–A	Yds	TD–INT
Bryson Barnes	10–19	112	1–1
Cameron Rising	8–21	95	1–1
Utes rushing
	Car	Yds	TD
Ja'Quinden Jackson	13	81	1
Micah Bernard	11	59	0
Cameron Rising	9	56	0
Money Parks	1	9	0
Jaylen Dixon	1	5	0
Devaughn Vele	1	-9	0
Bryson Barnes	7	-17	0
Utes receiving
	Rec	Yds	TD
Devaughn Vele	5	100	0
Jaylen Dixon	6	64	1
Logan Kendall	1	14	0
Money Parks	1	12	0
Ja'Quinden Jackson	1	8	0
Micah Bernard	3	8	0
Thomas Yassmin	1	1	1
