= Bryson Barnes =

American football player

No. 17 – Ottawa Redblacks
- Position: Quarterback
- Roster status: Active
- CFL status: American

Personal information
- Born: October 7, 2001 (age 25)
- Listed height: 6 ft 1 in (1.85 m)
- Listed weight: 213 lb (97 kg)

Career information
- High school: Milford (Milford, Utah)
- College: Utah (2020–2023); Utah State (2024–2025)
- NFL draft: 2026: undrafted

Career history
- Ottawa Redblacks (2026–present)

Awards and highlights
- Second-team All-Mountain West (2025)

Career CFL statistics as of 2026
- Passing completions: 50
- Passing attempts: 76
- Completion percentage: 65.8
- TD–INT: 2–3
- Passing yards: 612
- Passer rating: 82.8
- Rushing yards: 171
- Rushing touchdowns: 9
- Stats at CFL.ca

Bryson Barnes (born October 7, 2001) is an American professional football quarterback for the Ottawa Redblacks of the Canadian Football League (CFL). He played college football for the Utah Utes and Utah State Aggies.

== Early life ==
Barnes worked on his parents' pig farm. He attended Milford High School in Milford, Utah, where he completed 661 of 1,136 pass attempts for 11,344 yards and 137 touchdowns to 29 interceptions and rushed for 1,951 yards 47 touchdowns, while also bringing in a receiving touchdown. On defense as a safety he notched 115 tackles, nine pass deflections, four interceptions, and a forced fumble. Barnes decided to walk on to the Utah football team.

== College career ==
=== Utah ===
Barnes joined the Utah Utes as a walk-on and redshirted during the 2020 season, not seeing game action. He began the 2021 season as the third-string quarterback behind starter Charlie Brewer and Cameron Rising. After Brewer transferred following the third game of the season, Barnes was elevated to Rising's backup. He appeared in two regular-season games without recording a statistic, making his collegiate debut in the season-opening victory over Weber State and later appearing in a Week 10 victory over Colorado. In the 2022 Rose Bowl, Barnes replaced an injured Rising with just over four minutes remaining while trailing Ohio State 45–38. He completed both of his pass attempts for 23 yards and a touchdown while also rushing for a first down during the game-tying drive. Barnes led the Utes on a six-play, 57-yard drive that was capped by a touchdown pass to tight end Dalton Kincaid with 1:54 remaining, though Utah ultimately fell to Ohio State 48–45.

Barnes began the 2022 season as the primary backup to Rising. He made his season debut in Week 2 against Southern Utah, completing all six of his passes for 98 yards in a 73–7 victory. In Week 8 against Washington State, Barnes made his first collegiate start with Rising sidelined due to injury, completing 17 of 27 passes for 175 yards and a touchdown while adding 51 rushing yards in a 21–17 victory. Barnes appeared in 10 games with one start during the season as Utah finished 10–4, won the Pac-12 Championship, and earned a second consecutive Rose Bowl Game appearance against Penn State. In the second half of the Rose Bowl, Rising suffered a torn ACL, and Barnes entered the game, completing 10 of 19 passes for 112 yards with a touchdown and an interception in a 35–21 loss. On the season, Barnes completed 37 of 57 passes for 430 yards, four touchdowns, and two interceptions while rushing for 116 yards.

With Rising taking a medical redshirt during the 2023 season, Barnes won the starting quarterback job over fellow teammate Nate Johnson. He led the Utes to a season-opening victory over Florida, throwing for 159 yards and a touchdown while adding a rushing touchdown in a 24–11 win. Against Baylor, Barnes was replaced by Johnson due to ineffectiveness and played sparingly in the following two games as Johnson took over the starting role. After a loss to Oregon State, Barnes regained the starting job against California and led Utah to a 34–14 victory. The following week at No. 18 USC, Barnes led a game-winning field goal drive in a 34–32 victory. He threw for a then-career-high 235 yards, three touchdowns, and one interception while rushing for 57 yards and a touchdown. Utah finished the season 8–5 and earned an appearance in the 2023 Las Vegas Bowl against Northwestern, a 14–7 loss. Barnes appeared in 11 games with nine starts, completing 142 of 242 passes for 1,572 yards, 12 touchdowns, and 11 interceptions while rushing for 265 yards and three touchdowns. He entered the NCAA transfer portal on December 4, 2023,

=== Utah State ===
On January 9, 2024, Barnes announced that he would be transferring to Utah State. Barnes began the 2024 season as the primary backup to Spencer Petras. After Petras suffered an injury in the season opener against Robert Morris, Barnes entered in relief and completed 11 of 21 passes for 198 yards, two touchdowns, and one interception while rushing for 88 yards and a touchdown in his Aggies debut, helping Utah State to a victory. He started the following two games, losses to USC and his former school, Utah. Against Utah, Barnes accounted for three total touchdowns in the 38–21 defeat. After Petras returned from injury, Barnes continued to be utilized in designed offensive packages. In Week 11 against San Diego State, Petras suffered a season-ending injury, and Barnes entered in relief, completing 13 of 15 passes for 139 yards and three touchdowns. He also rushed 15 times for 193 yards and a touchdown in the 41–20 victory. His 193 rushing yards set a Utah State single-game record for a quarterback, and he was named Mountain West Conference Offensive Player of the Week for his performance. Barnes made his final start of the season in the regular-season finale against Colorado State, throwing for 189 yards, three touchdowns, and two interceptions while rushing for 185 yards and a touchdown in a loss. His performance made him the first quarterback in Utah State history to rush for at least 100 yards in consecutive games. Barnes appeared in nine games with three starts during the 2024 season, completing 77 of 126 passes for 856 yards, 12 touchdowns, and six interceptions. He also rushed 68 times for 530 yards, averaging 7.8 yards per carry, and scored five rushing touchdowns.

Barnes returned as Utah State's starting quarterback for the 2025 season, starting all 13 games. He led the Aggies to a 6–6 regular-season record, highlighted by a Week 7 victory over San Jose State, in which he threw for a career-high 326 yards and a touchdown while rushing for 54 yards and another score in a 30–25 win. In the 2025 Famous Idaho Potato Bowl, the final game of his collegiate career, Barnes threw for 116 yards with one interception and rushed for a touchdown before leaving the game with an injury in a 34–21 loss to Washington State. During the 2025 season, Barnes completed 211 of 356 passes for 2,803 yards, 18 touchdowns, and five interceptions. He also led Utah State in rushing attempts (189), rushing yards (740), and rushing touchdowns (10), while adding two receptions for seven yards and a touchdown. Following the season, he was named second-team All-Mountain West. His 3,543 total yards of offense ranked fifth in Utah State single-season history.

== Professional career ==
Pre-draft measurables
Height	Weight	Arm length	Hand span	Wingspan
6 ft 1 1/4 in (1.86 m)	213 lb (97 kg)	30 3/4 in (0.78 m)	9 5/8 in (0.24 m)	6 ft 3 in (1.91 m)
All values from Pro Day

From May 8–10, 2026, Barnes participated in Cleveland Browns' rookie minicamp but was not signed. He signed with the Ottawa Redblacks of the Canadian Football League (CFL) on May 13. During the preseason, Barnes competed with Max Duggan for the third-string quarterback role, while returning quarterbacks Dru Brown and Jake Maier competed for the starting job. Maier was named the starter, with Brown serving as his backup and Duggan as the third-string quarterback, leaving Barnes on the practice squad. After Week 2, Brown was traded to his former team, the Winnipeg Blue Bombers, and Duggan was released. In a corresponding move, the Redblacks signed McLeod Bethel-Thompson to serve as the backup quarterback, while Barnes was elevated to the active roster. In Week 4 against Saskatchewan, Barnes was utilized in short-yardage situations, scoring his first CFL rushing touchdown in a loss. Through game 16, he had 41 carries for 95 yards and a team-leading nine rushing touchdowns.

After the 0–16 Redblacks were unable to secure a win with Maier or Bethel-Thompson, head coach Ryan Dinwiddie named Barnes the team's starting quarterback prior to game 17 against the Toronto Argonauts. In his first career professional start on October 16, 2026, Barnes threw a 24-yard touchdown pass to Ayden Eberhardt with six seconds left to lead the Redblacks to a 40–39 victory and an end to the franchise's 22-game losing streak (the longest in modern CFL history). In this game, he completed 27 of 37 passes for 339 yards and two touchdowns (with no interceptions) while also rushing seven times for 62 yards. Barnes earned CFL Player of the Week honors for Week 20.

In his second start against the Hamilton Tiger-Cats, Barnes completed 13 of 26 passes for 150 yards and two interceptions before being replaced late in the game by Jake Maier, who scored two touchdowns in garbage time as the Redblacks lost 35–22.

== Career statistics ==
=== CFL ===
Year	Team	Games			Passing								Rushing			
Year	Team	GD	GS	Record	Cmp	Att	Pct	Yds	Y/A	TD	Int	Rtg	Att	Yds	Avg	TD
2026	OTT	16	2	1–1	50	76	65.8	612	8.1	2	3	82.8	52	171	3.3	9
Career		16	2	1–1	50	76	65.8	612	8.1	2	3	82.8	52	171	3.3	9

=== College ===
Season	Team	Games			Passing								Rushing			
Season	Team	GP	GS	Record	Cmp	Att	Pct	Yds	Y/A	TD	Int	Rtg	Att	Yds	Avg	TD
2020	Utah	0	0	—	Redshirted (redshirt)											
2021	Utah	3	0	—	2	2	100.0	23	11.5	1	0	361.6	1	10	10.0	0
2022	Utah	10	1	1−0	37	57	64.9	430	7.5	4	2	144.4	20	116	5.8	0
2023	Utah	11	9	5–4	142	242	58.7	1,572	6.3	12	11	155.9	90	265	2.9	3
2024	Utah State	9	3	0−3	77	126	61.1	856	6.8	12	6	140.1	68	530	7.8	5
2025	Utah State	13	13	6−7	211	356	59.3	2,803	7.9	18	5	139.3	189	740	3.9	10
Career		46	26	12−14	469	783	59.9	5,684	7.3	47	24	134.6	368	1,661	4.5	18
