= 2022 Utah Utes football team =

American college football season

2022 Utah Utes football

Pac-12 champion

Pac-12 Championship Game, W 47–24 vs. USC

Rose Bowl, L 21–35 vs. Penn State
- Conference: Pac-12 Conference

Ranking
- Coaches: No. 11
- AP: No. 10
- Record: 10–4 (7–2 Pac-12)
- Head coach: Kyle Whittingham (18th season)
- Offensive coordinator: Andy Ludwig (8th season)
- Offensive scheme: Spread
- Defensive coordinator: Morgan Scalley (7th season)
- Base defense: 4–2–5
- Home stadium: Rice–Eccles Stadium

Uniform
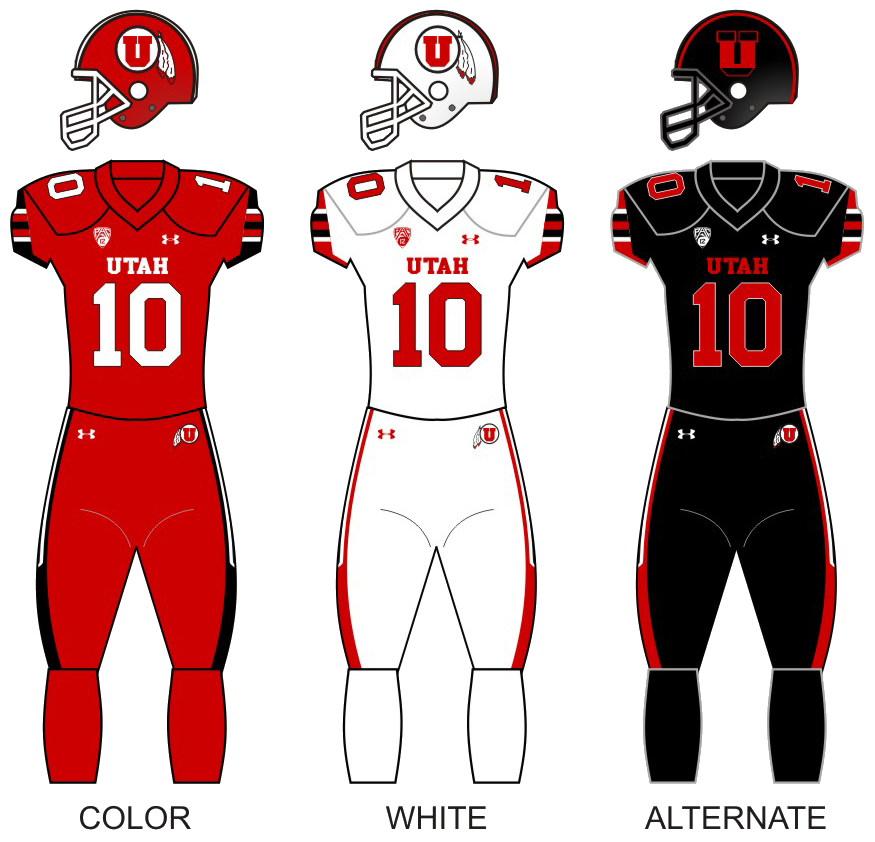

2022 Pac-12 Conference football standings
	Conf.			Overall
Team	W		L	W		L
No. 12 USC y	8	–	1	11	–	3
No. 10 Utah y$	7	–	2	10	–	4
No. 8 Washington	7	–	2	11	–	2
No. 15 Oregon	7	–	2	10	–	3
No. 17 Oregon State	6	–	3	10	–	3
No. 21 UCLA	6	–	3	9	–	4
Washington State	4	–	5	7	–	6
Arizona	3	–	6	5	–	7
California	2	–	7	4	–	8
Arizona State†	2	–	7	3	–	9
Stanford	1	–	8	3	–	9
Colorado	1	–	8	1	–	11
Championship: Utah 47, USC 24
$ – Conference champion; y – Championship game participant; Rankings from AP Poll

The 2022 Utah Utes football team represented the University of Utah as a member of the Pac-12 Conference during the 2022 NCAA Division I FBS football season. Led by 18th-year head coach Kyle Whittingham the Utes played their home games at Rice–Eccles Stadium in Salt Lake City. The Utes finished the season 10–4, 7–2 in Pac-12 play to finish in a three-way tie for second place. Due to tiebreaking rules, Utah received the bid to the Pac 12 Championship Game. There, it defeated No. 4-ranked USC for the second time that season to win the conference championship. As a result, for the second consecutive year Utah received a bid to the Rose Bowl, where it lost to Penn State.

== Preseason ==
In the preseason polls released on July 28, Utah was picked to finish the season as the top team in the conference.

== Schedule ==
Date	Time	Opponent	Rank	Site	TV	Result	Attendance
September 3	5:00 p.m.	at Florida*	No. 7	Ben Hill Griffin Stadium; Gainesville, FL	ESPN	L 26–29	90,799
September 10	11:30 a.m.	Southern Utah*	No. 13	Rice–Eccles Stadium; Salt Lake City, UT	P12N	W 73–7	51,531
September 17	8:00 p.m.	San Diego State*	No. 14	Rice–Eccles Stadium; Salt Lake City, UT	ESPN2	W 35–7	51,602
September 24	8:30 p.m.	at Arizona State	No. 13	Sun Devil Stadium; Tempe, AZ	ESPN	W 34–13	39,876
October 1	12:00 p.m.	Oregon State^{†}	No. 12	Rice–Eccles Stadium; Salt Lake City, UT	P12N	W 42–16	51,729
October 8	1:30 p.m.	at No. 18 UCLA	No. 11	Rose Bowl; Pasadena, CA	FOX	L 32–42	42,038
October 15	5:00 p.m.	No. 7 USC	No. 20	Rice–Eccles Stadium; Salt Lake City, UT	FOX	W 43–42	53,609
October 27	8:00 p.m.	at Washington State	No. 14	Martin Stadium; Pullman, WA	FS1	W 21–17	21,179
November 5	5:30 p.m.	Arizona	No. 14	Rice–Eccles Stadium; Salt Lake City, UT	P12N	W 45–20	51,919
November 12	8:00 p.m.	Stanford	No. 13	Rice–Eccles Stadium; Salt Lake City, UT	ESPN	W 42–7	51,951
November 19	8:30 p.m.	at No. 12 Oregon	No. 10	Autzen Stadium; Eugene, OR	ESPN	L 17–20	57,009
November 26	2:00 p.m.	at Colorado	No. 14	Folsom Field; Boulder, CO (Rumble in the Rockies)	P12N	W 63–21	33,474
December 2	5:00 p.m.	vs. No. 4 USC	No. 11	Allegiant Stadium; Paradise, NV (Pac-12 Championship Game)	FOX	W 47–24	61,195
January 2, 2023	3:00 p.m.	vs. No. 11 Penn State*	No. 8	Rose Bowl Stadium; Pasadena, CA (Rose Bowl Game, College GameDay)	ESPN	L 21–35	94,873
*Non-conference game; ^{†}Homecoming; Rankings from AP Poll (and CFP Rankings, after November 1) released prior to game; All times are in Mountain time

== Roster ==
2022 Utah Utes football team roster
Players
Coaches
Offense

Pos.	#	Name	Class
WR	0	Chris Reed	Fr
RB	1	Jaylon Glover	Fr
RB	2	Micah Bernard	So
RB	3	Ja'Quinden Jackson	Fr
TE	4	Munir McClain	So
WR	5	Tao Johnson	Fr
RB	6	Ricky Parks	Fr
QB	7	Cameron Rising	Jr
QB	8	Brandon Rose	Fr
RB	9	Tavion Thomas	Jr
WR	10	Money Parks	So
WR	11	Makai Cope	Fr
WR	12	Sidney Mbanasor	Fr
QB	13	Nate Johnson	Fr
WR	15	Tiquan Gilmore	Jr
QB	16	Bryson Barnes	So
WR	17	Devaughn Vele	So
QB	18	Luke Bottari	Jr
WR	19	Luca Caldarella	So
WR	20	Jett Meine	Fr
WR	21	Solomon Enis	Sr
RB	24	Chris Curry	Jr
WR	25	Jaylen Dixon	Sr
RB	26	Charlie Vincent	So
RB	27	Elvis Vakapuna	So
WR	28	Pierre Moudourou	Sr
TE, FB	32	Logan Kendall	Sr
TE	35	Isaac Vaha	Fr
RB	37	Faysal Aden	So
RB	41	Jonathan Johnson	Fr
TE	46	Hayden Erickson	Fr
TE	48	Deven Johnson	Fr
OL	51	Keaton Bills	So
OL	52	Michael Mokofisi	Fr
OL	53	Johnny Maea	Jr
OL	54	Paul Maile	Jr
OL	59	Falcon Kaumatule	So
OL	60	Shintaro Mann	So
OL	61	Kolinu'u Faaiu	Fr
OL	66	Hunter Deuel	Fr
OL	68	Jaren Kump	So
OL	70	Hunter Lotulelei	Fr
OL	71	Braeden Daniels	Jr
OL	73	Tanoa Togiai	Fr
OL	74	Keith Olson	Fr
OL	75	Tyler Knaak	Fr
OL	76	Zereoue Williams	Fr
OL	78	Sataoa Laumea	So
OL	79	Alex Harrison	So
TE	80	Brant Kuithe	Sr
WR	83	Collin Edwards	Fr
TE	84	Taniela Pututau	Fr
WR	85	Masaki Kudo	Fr
TE	86	Dalton Kincaid	Sr
TE	87	Thomas Yassmin	Jr
TE	88	Landon Morris	Fr
WR	89	Noah Bennee	Fr
OL	98	Cody Christensen	Fr
TE	--	James Allemann	Fr
WR	--	Brandon Bethel	Fr
WR	--	Kaimana Hanohano	Fr
OL	--	Peter Terry	Fr

Defense

Pos.	#	Name	Class
LB	0	Ethan Calvert	Fr
CB	1	Clark Phillips III	So
CB	2	Kenzel Lawler	Fr
LB	3	Mohamoud Diabate	Sr
CB	4	JaTravis Broughton	Jr
CB	5	Caine Savage	So
LB	6	Justin Medlock	Fr
DE	7	Van Fillinger	So
S	8	Cole Bishop	So
CB	9	Elijah Davis	Fr
S	11	R. J. Hubert	Sr
S	12	Clayton Isbell	Jr
DE	12	Tyler Wegis	Fr
DE	13	Chase Kennedy	Fr
LB	14	Josh Calvert	So
LB	15	Malone Mataele	Jr
CB	16	Zemaiah Vaughn	So
S	19	Bryson Reeves	So
LB	20	Lander Barton	Fr
LB	21	Karene Reid	So
CB	23	Faybian Marks	So
S	24	Bleu Stewart	Fr
S	28	Sione Vaki	Fr
CB	29	Elisha Lloyd	Fr
CB	30	Nick Howe	Fr
CB	33	Jocelyn Malaska	Fr
S	36	Stone Azarcon	Sr
S	38	Brock Nowatzke	Fr
S	39	Jadon Pearson	So
S	42	Malae Tanuvasa	Fr
DE	43	Gavin Nawahine	Fr
LB	44	Mason Tufaga	Fr
LB	46	Lolani Langi	Fr
DE	47	Miki Suguturaga	So
DT	50	Fua Pututau	Jr
LB	54	Hayden Furey	Jr
LB	55	Andrew Mata'afa	Jr
DE	56	Ka'eo Akana	Fr
DT	57	Keanu Tanuvasa	Fr
DT	58	Junior Tafuna	So
DT	77	Samote Pepa	Fr
DE	81	Connor O'Toole	So
DE	83	Jonah Elliss	So
DT	90	Devin Kaufusi	Sr
DE	91	Gabe Reid	Sr
DE	92	James LeBaron	Fr
LB	93	Shuhei Mitsumoto	So
DT	94	Tevita Fotu	Fr
DT	95	Aliki Vimahi	So
DE	96	Helaman Ofahengaue	Fr
DT	99	Tennessee Pututau	So
LB	--	Spencer Clegg	Fr
CB	--	Tiloi Nawahine	Fr
DT	--	Jason Siaosi	Sr

Special teams

Pos.	#	Name	Class
P	34	Jack Bouwmeester	Jr
K	38	Ben Norton	Sr
K	40	Joey Cheek	Fr
LS	57	J. T. Greep	So
P	61	Michael Williams	Jr
LS	65	Logan Castor	Fr
K	67	Jordan Noyes	So
K	97	Jadon Redding	Jr

Head coach

- Kyle Whittingham

Coordinators/assistant coaches

- Morgan Scalley – Defensive coordinator/safeties
- Andy Ludwig – Offensive coordinator/quarterbacks
- Jim Harding – Assistant head coach/offensive line
- Sharrieff Shah – Special teams coordinator/cornerbacks
- Freddie Whittingham – Recruiting coordinator/tight ends
- Lewis Powell – Defensive ends
- Luther Elliss – Defensive tackles
- Colton Swan – Linebackers
- Chad Bumphis – Wide receivers
- Quinton Ganther – Running backs
- Josh Crawford – Offensive graduate assistant
- Bill Weber – Offensive graduate assistant
- Chase Murdock – Defensive graduate assistant
- Quincy Watkins – Defensive graduate assistant
- Ryan Blakney – Offensive analyst
- Vince Conti – Defensive analyst
- Dom Conti – Special teams analyst
- Doug Elisaia – Director, strength and conditioning
- Robert Blechen – Director, personnel coordinator
- Adam Fry – Director, football operations
- Jeff Rudy – Associate director for football administration

Legend

- (C) Team captain
- (S) Suspended
- (I) Ineligible
- Injured
- Redshirt

Roster
Last update: 10/10/22

== Game summaries ==
=== at Florida ===
Overall record	Previous meeting	Previous winner
0–1	November 19, 1977	Florida Gators

No. 7 Utah Utes (0-0) vs Florida Gators (0-0) – Game summary

Quarter	1	2	3	4	Total
No. 7 Utes	7	6	6	7	26
Gators	7	7	0	15	29

at Ben Hill Griffin Stadium • Gainesville, FL

- Date: September 3, 2022
- Game time: 7:00 p.m. EST
- Game weather: Rainy, 77 °F (25 °C)
- Game attendance: 90,799
- Referee: Chris Coyte
- TV announcers (ESPN): Bob Wischusen (play-by-play), Dan Orlovsky (Color), Kris Budden (sideline)

Game information

First quarter

- (11:23) UTAH – Brant Kuithe 7-yard pass from Cameron Rising, Jordan Noyes kick (Drive: 5 plays, 25 yards, 1:24; Utah 7–0)
- (0:39) FLA – Anthony Richardson 2-yard run, Adam Mihalek kick (Drive: 14 plays, 63 yards, 7:13; Tied 7–7)

Second quarter

- (5:13) UTAH – Jordan Noyes 43-yard field goal (Drive: 11 plays, 50 yards, 5:13; Utah 10–7)
- (3:18) UTAH – Jordan Noyes 31-yard field goal (Drive: 8 plays, 25 yards, 4:40; Utah 13–7)
- (1:42) Florida – Anthony Richardson 45-yard run, Adam Mihalek kick (Drive: 4 plays, 79 yards, 1:30; Florida 14–13)

Third quarter

- (0:12) UTAH – Micah Bernard 7-yard run (Drive: 9 plays, 89 yards, 4:59; Utah 19–14)

Fourth quarter

- (12:48) FLA – Montrell Johnson Jr. 14-yard run, Ja'Quavion Fraziars 2-point pass (Drive: 8 plays, 75 yards, 2:24; Florida 22–19)
- (6:26) UTAH – Tavion Thomas 4-yard run, Jordan Noyes kick (Drive: 11 plays, 73 yards, 6:14; Utah 26–22)
- (1:25) FLA – Anthony Richardson 2-yard run, Adam Mihalek kick (Drive: 14 plays, 75 yards, 4:57; Florida 29–26)

Statistics	UTAH	FLA
First downs	25	23
Total yards	446	451
Rushes/yards	39–230	39–283
Passing yards	216	168
Passing: Comp–Att–Int	22–32–1	17–24–0
Time of possession	32:17	27:43

Team	Category	Player	Statistics
Utah	Passing	Cameron Rising	22/32, 216 yards, TD, INT
Utah	Rushing	Tavion Thomas	23 carries, 115 yards, TD
Utah	Receiving	Brant Kuithe	9 receptions, 105 yards, TD
Florida	Passing	Anthony Richardson	17/24, 168 yards
Florida	Rushing	Anthony Richardson	11 carries, 106 yards, 3 TD
Florida	Receiving	Ricky Pearsall	4 receptions, 67 yards

=== vs Southern Utah ===
Overall record	Previous meeting	Previous winner
2–0	September 1, 2016	Utah Utes

Southern Utah Thunderbirds (1–0) vs No. 13 Utah Utes (0–1) – Game summary

Quarter	1	2	3	4	Total
Thunderbirds	7	0	0	0	7
No. 13 Utes	7	38	14	14	73

at Rice-Eccles Stadium • Salt Lake City, UT

- Date: September 10, 2022
- Game time: 11:30 a.m.
- Game weather: Sunny, 70 °F (21 °C)
- Game attendance: 51,531
- Referee: Mark Duddy
- TV announcers (Pac-12 Network): Roxy Bernstein (play-by-play), Lincoln Kennedy (analyst)

Game information

First quarter

- (10:33) UTAH – Tavion Thomas 13-yard run, Jordan Noyes kick (Drive: 8 plays, 44 yards, 4:24; Utah 7–0)
- (2:22) USU – Grady Robison 28-yard run, Micah Petit kick (Drive: 1 plays, 28 yards, 0:08; Tied 7–7)

Second quarter

- (14:38) UTAH – Tavion Thomas 7-yard run, Jordan Noyes kick (Drive: 7 plays, 56 yards, 2:35; Utah 14–7)
- (13:27) UTAH – Chris Curry 12-yard run, Jordan Noyes kick (Drive: 2 plays, 18 yards, 1:05; Utah 21–7)
- (8:34) UTAH – Jordan Noyes 26-yard field goal (Drive: 6 plays, 37 yards, 2:12; Utah 24–7)
- (4:13) UTAH – Brant Kuithe 2-yard pass from Cameron Rising, Jordan Noyes kick (Drive: 5 plays, 65 yards, 2:49; Utah 31–7)
- (1:08) UTAH – Dalton Kincaid 37-yard pass from Cameron Rising, Jordan Noyes kick (Drive: 5 plays, 85 yards, 1:30; Utah 38–7)
- (0:12) UTAH – Dalton Kincaid 6-yard pass from Cameron Rising, Jordan Noyes kick (Drive: 4 plays, 57 yards, 0:28; Utah 45–7)

Third quarter

- (13:53) UTAH – R. J. Hubert 39-yard interception return, Jordan Noyes kick (Utah 52-7)
- (7:49) UTAH – Jaylon Glover 4-yard run, Jordan Noyes kick (Drive: 6 plays, 78 yards, 3:06; Utah 59–7)

Fourth quarter

- (14:18) UTAH – Thomas Tassmin 29-yard pass from Bryson Barnes, Jordon Noyes kick (Drive: 12 plays, 80 yards, 7:31; Utah 66–7)
- (10:54) UTAH – Jaylon Glover 29-yard run, Jordan Noyes kick (Drive: 2 plays, 72 yards, 0:52; Utah 73–7)

Statistics	SUU	UTAH
First downs	4	31
Total yards	85	598
Rushes/yards	21–43	42–246
Passing yards	42	352
Passing: Comp–Att–Int	11–23–2	23–29–0
Time of possession	23:34	36:26

Team	Category	Player	Statistics
Southern Utah	Passing	Justin Miller	11/21, 42 yards, 2 INT
Southern Utah	Rushing	Grady Robison	2 carries, 27 yards, TD
Southern Utah	Receiving	Timothy Patrick	4 receptions, 17 yards
Utah	Passing	Cameron Rising	17/23, 254 yards, 3 TD
Utah	Rushing	Chris Curry	6 carries, 66 yards, TD
Utah	Receiving	Dalton Kincaid	7 receptions, 107 yards, 2 TD

=== vs San Diego State ===
Overall record	Previous meeting	Previous winner
13–12–1	September 18, 2021	San Diego State

San Diego State Aztecs (1–1) vs No. 14 Utah Utes (1–1) – Game summary

Quarter	1	2	3	4	Total
Aztecs	0	0	0	7	7
No . 14 Utes	0	21	14	0	35

at Rice-Eccles Stadium • Salt Lake City, UT

- Date: September 17, 2022
- Game time: 8:15 p.m.
- Game weather: Cloudy, 63 °F (17 °C)
- Game attendance: 51,602
- Referee: Mike Cuttone
- TV announcers (ESPN2): Mark Jones (play-by-play), Robert Griffin III (analyst), Quint Kessenich (sideline)

Game information

First quarter

None

Second quarter

- (8:59) UTAH – Brant Kuithe 30-yard pass from Cameron Rising, Jordon Noyes kick (Drive: 7 plays, 22 yards, 2:25; Utah 7–0)
- (2:07) UTAH – Solomon Enis 13-yard pass from Cameron Rising, Jordon Noyes kick (Drive: 9 plays, 82 yards, 4:34; Utah 14–0)
- (0:20) UTAH – Devaughn Vele 15-yard pass from Cameron Rising, Jordon Noyes kick (Drive: 4 plays, 27 yards, 1:47; Utah 21–0)

Third quarter

- (11:31) UTAH – Tavion Thomas 18-yard run, Jordon Noyes kick (Drive: 4 plays, 30 yards, 1:51; Utah 28–0)
- (7:34) UTAH – Devaughn Vele 3-yard pass from Cameron Rising, Jordon Noyes kick (Drive: 4 plays, 55 yards, 1:52; Utah 35–0)

Fourth quarter

- (3:56) SDSU – Josh Nicholson 18-yard pass from Kyle Crum, Jack Browning kick (Drive: 9 plays, 25 yards, 4:15; Utah 35–7)

Statistics	SDSU	UTAH
First downs	9	22
Total yards	173	398
Rushes/yards	34–113	38–174
Passing yards	60	224
Passing: Comp–Att–Int	7–21–1	18–30–0
Time of possession	28:38	31:22

Team	Category	Player	Statistics
San Diego State	Passing	Kyle Crum	5/16, 53 yards, TD, INT
San Diego State	Rushing	Jaylon Armstead	5 carries, 31 yards
San Diego State	Receiving	Josh Nicholson	2 receptions, 23 yards, TD
Utah	Passing	Cameron Rising	18/30, 224 yards, 4 TD
Utah	Rushing	Tavion Thomas	16 carries, 59 yards, TD
Utah	Receiving	Brant Kuithe	5 receptions, 64 yards, TD

=== at Arizona State ===
Overall record	Previous meeting	Previous winner
10–22	October 16, 2021	Utah Utes

No. 13 Utah Utes (2–1) vs Arizona State Sun Devils (1–2) – Game summary

Quarter	1	2	3	4	Total
No. 13 Utes	14	10	7	3	34
Sun Devils	0	6	0	7	13

at Sun Devil Stadium • Tempe, AZ

- Date: September 24, 2022
- Game time: 7:30 p.m. PST
- Game weather: Clear, 96 °F (36 °C)
- Game attendance: 39,876
- Referee: Francisco Villar
- TV announcers (ESPN): Dave Pasch (play-by-play), Dusty Dvoracek (analyst), Tom Luginbill (sideline)

Game information

First quarter

- (11:41) UTAH – Dalton Kincaid 29-yard pass from Cameron Rising, Jordon Noyes kick (Drive: 2 plays, 53 yards, 0:22; Utah 7–0)
- (3:16) UTAH – Dalton Kincaid 6-yard pass from Cameron Rising, Jordon Noyes kick (Drive: 14 plays, 70 yards, 6:15; Utah 14–0)

Second quarter

- (7:03) UTAH – Jordan Noyes 23-yard field goal (Drive: 8 plays, 26 yards, 4:03; Utah 17–0)
- (4:45) ASU – Carter Brown 36-yard field goal (Drive: 6 plays, 24 yards, 2:18; Utah 17–3)
- (0:44) UTAH – Ja'Quinden Jackson 2-yard run, Jordon Noyes kick (Drive: 10 plays, 75 yards, 4:01; Utah 24–3)
- (0:00) ASU – Carter Brown 47-yard field goal (Drive: 6 plays, 24 yards, 0:44; Utah 24–6)

Third quarter

- (6:16) UTAH – Jaylen Dixon 11-yard run, Jordon Noyes kick (Drive: 9 plays, 74 yards, 3:56; Utah 31–6)

Fourth quarter

- (10:49) UTAH – Jordan Noyes 28-yard field goal (Drive: 9 plays, 24 yards, 4:11; Utah 34–6)
- (2:06) ASU – Messiah Swinson 11-yard pass from Emory Jones, Carter Brown kick (Drive: 10 plays, 45 yards, 3:23; Utah 34–13)

Statistics	UTAH	ASU
First downs	26	15
Total yards	465	267
Rushes/yards	45–205	20–6
Passing yards	260	261
Passing: Comp–Att–Int	19–29–1	21–36–2
Time of possession	35:33	24:27

Team	Category	Player	Statistics
Utah	Passing	Cameron Rising	19/29, 260 yards, 2 TD, INT
Utah	Rushing	Tavion Thomas	11 carries, 60 yards
Utah	Receiving	Thomas Yassmin	1 reception, 72 yards
Arizona State	Passing	Emory Jones	21/36, 261 yards, TD, INT
Arizona State	Rushing	Xazavian Valladay	8 carries, 30 yards
Arizona State	Receiving	Elijhah Badger	5 receptions, 76 yards

=== vs Oregon State ===
Overall record	Previous meeting	Previous winner
11–12–1	October 23, 2021	Oregon State

Oregon State Beavers (3–1) vs No. 12 Utah Utes (3–1) – Game summary

Quarter	1	2	3	4	Total
Beavers	7	6	3	0	16
No. 12 Utes	14	7	14	7	42

at Rice-Eccles Stadium • Salt Lake City, UT

- Date: October 1, 2022
- Game time: 11:00 a.m.
- Game weather: Sunny, 62 °F (17 °C)
- Game attendance: 51,729
- Referee: Mike McCabe
- TV announcers (Pac-12 Network): Ted Robinson (play-by-play), Yogi Roth (analyst)

Game information

First quarter

- (13:03) UTAH – Jaylen Dixon 19-yard pass from Cameron Rising, Jordon Noyes kick (Drive: 3 plays, 25 yards, 1:15; Utah 7–0)
- (9:36) OSU – Silas Bolden 29-yard run, Atticus Sappington kick (Drive: 7 plays, 79 yards, 3:21; Tied 7–7)
- (7:21) UTAH – Clark Phillips III 38-yard interception return, Jordon Noyes kick (Utah 14–7)

Second quarter

- (14:13) UTAH – Cameron Rising 24-yard run, Jordon Noyes kick (Drive: 5 plays, 60 yards, 1:07; Utah 21–7)
- (9:38) OSU – Atticus Sappington 26-yard field goal (Drive: 9 plays, 42 yards, 4:35; Utah 21–10)
- (0:37) OSU – Atticus Sappington 26-yard field goal (Drive: 10 plays, 72 yards, 2:48; Utah 21–13)

Third quarter

- (9:46) OSU – Atticus Sappington 31-yard field goal (Drive: 8 plays, 44 yards, 3:42; Utah 21–16)
- (6:18) UTAH – Devaughn Vele 16-yard pass from Cameron Rising, Jordon Noyes kick (Drive: 8 plays, 75 yards, 3:28; Utah 28–16)
- (1:57) UTAH – Jaylen Dixon 22-yard run, Jordon Noyes kick (Drive: 2 plays, 30 yards, 0:43; Utah 35–16)

Fourth quarter

- (12:38) UTAH – Dalton Kincaid 4-yard pass from Cameron Rising, Jordon Noyes kick (Drive: 5 plays, 36 yards, 2:18; Utah 42–16)

Statistics	OSU	UTAH
First downs	21	20
Total yards	417	361
Rushes/yards	37–171	31–162
Passing yards	246	199
Passing: Comp–Att–Int	16–30–4	19–25–0
Time of possession	31:15	28:45

Team	Category	Player	Statistics
Oregon State	Passing	Ben Gulbranson	12/21, 177 yards, 2 INT
Oregon State	Rushing	Deshaun Fenwick	10 carries, 44 yards
Oregon State	Receiving	Tre'Shaun Harrison	5 receptions, 96 yards
Utah	Passing	Cameron Rising	19/25, 199 yards, 3 TD
Utah	Rushing	Cameron Rising	7 carries, 73 yards, TD
Utah	Receiving	Devaughn Vele	7 receptions, 94 yards, TD

=== at No. 18 UCLA ===
Overall record	Previous meeting	Previous winner
8–11	October 30, 2021	Utah Utes

No. 11 Utah Utes (4–1) vs No. 18 UCLA Bruins (5–0) – Game summary

Quarter	1	2	3	4	Total
No. 11 Utes	0	10	8	14	32
No. 18 Bruins	7	7	14	14	42

at Rose Bowl • Pasadena, CA

- Date: October 8, 2022
- Game time: 12:30 p.m. PST
- Game weather: Sunny, 84 °F (29 °C)
- Game attendance: 42,038
- Referee: Steven Strimling
- TV announcers (FOX): Tim Brando (play-by-play), Spencer Tillman (analyst)

Game information

First quarter

- (0:10) UCLA – Dorian Thompson-Robinson 7-yard run, Nicholas Barr-Mira kick (Drive: 7 plays, 97 yards, 3:20; UCLA 7–0)

Second quarter

- (10:00) UTAH – Jordan Noyes 23-yard field goal (Drive: 11 plays, 70 yards, 5:10; UCLA 7–3)
- (7:34) UCLA – Jake Bobo 7-yard pass from Dorian Thompson-Robinson, Nicholas Barr-Mira kick (Drive: 6 plays, 75 yards, 2:26; UCLA 14–3)
- (3:14) UTAH – Tavion Thomas 5-yard run, Jordon Noyes kick (Drive: 8 plays, 84 yards, 4:15; UCLA 14–10)

Third quarter

- (10:50) UCLA – Kam Brown 5-yard pass from Dorian Thompson-Robinson, Nicholas Barr-Mira kick (Drive: 9 plays, 43 yards, 4:03; UCLA 21–10)
- (5:01) UTAH – Cameron Rising 6-yard run, Cameron Rising run for two-point conversion (Drive: 11 plays, 75 yards, 5:49; UCLA 21–18)
- (1:07) UCLA – Jake Bobo 10-yard pass from Dorian Thompson-Robinson, Nicholas Barr-Mira kick (Drive: 8 plays, 75 yards, 3:54; UCLA 28–18)

Fourth quarter

- (11:39) UTAH – Cameron Rising 9-yard run, Jordon Noyes kick (Drive: 10 plays, 75 yards, 4:28; UCLA 28–25)
- (11:17) UCLA – Logan Loya 70-yard pass from Dorian Thompson-Robinson, Nicholas Barr-Mira kick (Drive: 2 plays, 61 yards, 0:15; UCLA 35–25)
- (9:26) UCLA – Zach Charbonnet 1-yard run, Nicholas Barr-Mira kick (Drive: 1 plays, 1 yards, 0:04; UCLA 42–25)
- (0:31) UTAH – Clark Phillips III 80-yard interception return, Jordon Noyes kick (Drive: 11 plays, 52 yards, 5:34; UCLA 42–32)

Statistics	UTAH	UCLA
First downs	31	21
Total yards	479	502
Rushes/yards	43–192	38–203
Passing yards	287	299
Passing: Comp–Att–Int	23–34–1	18–23–1
Time of possession	33:51	26:09

Team	Category	Player	Statistics
Utah	Passing	Cameron Rising	23/32, 287 yards, INT
Utah	Rushing	Tavion Thomas	18 carries, 91 yards, TD
Utah	Receiving	Devaughn Vele	6 receptions, 87 yards
UCLA	Passing	Dorian Thompson-Robinson	18/23, 299 yards, 4 TD, INT
UCLA	Rushing	Zach Charbonnet	22 carries, 198 yards, TD
UCLA	Receiving	Logan Loya	1 reception, 70 yards, TD

=== vs No. 7 USC ===
Overall record	Previous meeting	Previous winner
7–12	October 9, 2021	Utah Utes

No. 7 USC Trojans (6–0) vs No. 20 Utah Utes (4–2) – Game summary

Quarter	1	2	3	4	Total
No. 7 Trojans	14	14	7	7	42
No. 20 Utes	7	14	7	15	43

at Rice-Eccles Stadium • Salt Lake City, UT

- Date: October 15, 2022
- Game time: 6:00 p.m.
- Game weather: Sunny, 68 °F (20 °C)
- Game attendance: 53,609
- Referee: Mark Duddy
- TV announcers (FOX): Jason Benetti (play-by-play), Brock Huard (analyst), Allison Williams (sideline)

Game information

First quarter

- (13:16) USC – Travis Dye 8-yard run, Denis Lynch kick (Drive: 5 plays, 75 yards, 1:44; USC 7–0)
- (4:53) USC – Jordan Addison 2-yard pass from Caleb Williams, Denis Lynch kick (Drive: 9 plays, 80 yards, 4:04; USC 14–0)
- (1:08) UTAH – Micah Bernard 12-yard run, Jadon Redding kick (Drive: 9 plays, 75 yards, 3:45; USC 14–7)

Second quarter

- (14:20) USC – Kyron Hudson 2-yard pass from Caleb Williams, Denis Lynch kick (Drive: 4 plays, 69 yards, 1:48; USC 21–7)
- (4:01) UTAH – Cameron Rising 2-yard run, Jadon Redding kick (Drive: 4 plays, 60 yards, 1:37; USC 21–14)
- (1:15) USC – Josh Falo 3-yard pass from Caleb Williams, Denis Lynch kick (Drive: 9 plays, 79 yards, 2:46; USC 28–14)
- (0:30) UTAH – Devaughn Vele 16-yard pass from Cameron Rising, Jadon Redding kick (Drive: 5 plays, 70 yards, 0:45; USC 28–21)

Third quarter

- (12:02) UTAH – Dalton Kincaid 4-yard pass from Cameron Rising, Jadon Redding kick (Drive: 7 plays, 75 yards, 2:58; Tied 28–28)
- (11:02) USC – Josh Falo 11-yard pass from Caleb Williams, Denis Lynch kick (Drive: 3 plays, 50 yards, 1:00; USC 35–28)

Fourth quarter

- (10:55) UTAH – Cameron Rising 1-yard run, Jadon Redding kick (Drive: 10 plays, 79 yards, 4:10; Tied 35–35)
- (6:15) USC – Michael Jackson III 20-yard pass from Caleb Williams, Denis Lynch kick (Drive: 11 plays, 90 yards, 4:40; USC 42–35)
- (0:48) UTAH – Cameron Rising 1-yard run, Cameron Rising two-point run (Drive: 15 plays, 75 yards, 5:27; Utah 43–42)

Statistics	USC	UTAH
First downs	28	31
Total yards	556	562
Rushes/yards	27–175	32–138
Passing yards	381	424
Passing: Comp–Att–Int	25–42–0	31–45–0
Time of possession	28:10	31:50

Team	Category	Player	Statistics
USC	Passing	Caleb Williams	25/42, 381 yards, 5 TD
USC	Rushing	Travis Dye	11 carries, 76 yards, TD
USC	Receiving	Mario Williams	4 receptions, 145 yards
Utah	Passing	Cameron Rising	30/44, 415 yards, 2 TD
Utah	Rushing	Cameron Rising	11 carries, 60 yards, 3 TD
Utah	Receiving	Dalton Kincaid	16 receptions, 234 yards, TD

=== at Washington State ===
Overall record	Previous meeting	Previous winner
2–1	September 25, 2021	Utah Utes

No. 14 Utah Utes (5–2) vs Washington Cougars (4–3) – Game summary

Quarter	1	2	3	4	Total
No. 14 Utes	0	14	7	0	21
Cougars	0	7	0	10	17

at Martin Stadium • Pullman, WA

- Date: October 27, 2022
- Game time: 7:00 p.m. PST
- Game weather: Cloudy, 43 °F (6 °C)
- Game attendance: 21,179
- Referee: Francisco Villar
- TV announcers (FS1): Jeff Levering (play-by-play), Petros Papadakis (analyst)

Game information

First quarter

None

Second quarter

- (13:24) WSU – De'Zhaun Stribling 29-yard pass from Cameron Ward, Dean Janikowski kick (Drive: 6 plays, 61 yards, 2:01; Washington State 7–0)
- (9:23) UTAH – Ja'Quinden Jackson 6-yard run, Jadon Redding kick (Drive: 7 plays, 65 yards, 4:01; Tied 7–7)
- (0:20) UTAH – Jaylon Glover 1-yard run, Jadon Redding kick (Drive: 8 plays, 25 yards, 2:27; Utah 14–7)

Third quarter

- (1:24) UTAH – Dalton Kincaid 5-yard pass from Bryson Barnes, Jadon Redding kick (Drive: 7 plays, 60 yards, 4:00; Utah 21–7)

Fourth quarter

- (14:17) WSU – Cameron Ward 7-yard run, Jadon Redding kick (Drive: 6 plays, 72 yards, 1:53; Utah 21–14)
- (4:48) WSU – Dean Janikowski 42-yard field goal (Drive: 7 plays, 12 yards, 3:13; Utah 21–17)

Statistics	UTAH	WSU
First downs	19	14
Total yards	344	264
Rushes/yards	42–169	19–42
Passing yards	175	222
Passing: Comp–Att–Int	17–27–0	27–31–0
Time of possession	35:07	24:53

Team	Category	Player	Statistics
Utah	Passing	Bryson Barnes	17/27, 175 yards, TD
Utah	Rushing	Jaylon Glover	20 carries, 76 yards, TD
Utah	Receiving	Dalton Kincaid	7 receptions, 56 yards, TD
Washington State	Passing	Cam Ward	27/31, 222 yards, TD
Washington State	Rushing	Cameron Ward	12 carries, 28 yards, TD
Washington State	Receiving	De'Zhaun Stribling	4 receptions, 66 yards, TD

=== vs Arizona ===
Overall record	Previous meeting	Previous winner
24–19–2	November 13, 2021	Utah Utes

Arizona Wildcats (3–5) vs No. 14 Utah Utes (6–2) – Game summary

Quarter	1	2	3	4	Total
Wildcats	7	3	0	10	20
No. 14 Utes	14	14	3	14	45

at Rice-Eccles Stadium • Salt Lake City, UT

- Date: November 5, 2022
- Game time: 5:30 p.m.
- Game weather: Cloudy, 46 °F (8 °C)
- Game attendance: 51,919
- Referee: Mike McCabe
- TV announcers (Pac-12 Network): Ted Robinson (play-by-play), Yogi Roth (analyst)

Game information

First quarter

- (8:53) UTAH – Jaylen Dixon 7-yard run, Jadon Redding kick (Drive: 6 plays, 37 yards, 2:26; Utah 7–0)
- (7:07) ARIZ – Jayden de Laura 3-yard run, Tyler Loop kick (Drive: 4 plays, 75 yards, 1:40; Tied 7–7)
- (1:35) UTAH – Nate Johnson 8-yard run, Jadon Redding kick (Drive: 11 plays, 75 yards, 5:32; Utah 14–7)

Second quarter

- (11:21) UTAH – Ja'Quinden Jackson 2-yard run, Jadon Redding kick (Drive: 5 plays, 60 yards, 2:41; Utah 21–7)
- (3:23) UTAH – Nate Johnson 9-yard run, Jadon Redding kick (Drive: 1 plays, 9 yards, 0:07; Utah 28–7)
- (0:44) ARIZ – Tyler Loop 30-yard field goal (Drive: 8 plays, 62 yards, 2:39; Utah 28–10)

Third quarter

- (4:31) UTAH – Jadon Redding 27-yard field goal (Drive: 9 plays, 41 yards, 4:49; Utah 31–10)

Fourth quarter

- (10:16) UTAH – Thomas Yassmin 12-yard pass from Cameron Rising, Jadon Redding kick (Drive: 10 plays, 61 yards, 4:49; Utah 37–10)
- (4:10) UTAH – Charlie Vincent 2-yard run, Jadon Redding kick (Drive: 7 plays, 43 yards, 4:29; Utah 45–10)
- (2:31) ARIZ – Team safety (Drive: 5 plays, 23 yards, 1:32; Utah 45–12)
- (0:57) ARIZ – Tetairoa McMillan 2-yard pass from Noah Fifita, Noah Fifita two-point pass to Tetairoa McMillan (Drive: 5 plays, 58 yards, 1:29; Utah 45–20)

Statistics	ARIZ	UTAH
First downs	14	27
Total yards	387	457
Rushes/yards	25–156	55–306
Passing yards	231	151
Passing: Comp–Att–Int	15–30–0	13–25–0
Time of possession	22:01	37:59

Team	Category	Player	Statistics
Arizona	Passing	Jayden de Laura	10/20, 159 yards
Arizona	Rushing	Michael Wiley	6 carries, 64 yards
Arizona	Receiving	Tetairoa McMillan	4 receptions, 78 yards, TD
Utah	Passing	Cameron Rising	13/25, 151 yards, TD
Utah	Rushing	Ja'Quinden Jackson	13 carries, 97 yards, TD
Utah	Receiving	Devaughn Vele	5 receptions, 57 yards

=== vs Stanford ===
Overall record	Previous meeting	Previous winner
6–4	November 5, 2021	Utah Utes

Stanford Cardinal (3–6) vs No. 13 Utah Utes (7–2) – Game summary

Quarter	1	2	3	4	Total
Cardinal	7	0	0	0	7
No. 13 Utes	0	14	21	7	42

at Rice-Eccles Stadium • Salt Lake City, UT

- Date: November 12, 2022
- Game time: 8:00 p.m.
- Game weather: Cloudy, 31 °F (−1 °C)
- Game attendance: 51,919
- Referee: Michael Mothershed
- TV announcers (ESPN): Dave Pasch (play-by-play), Dusty Dvoracek (analyst), Tom Luginbill (sideline)

Game information

First quarter

- (3:40) STAN – Tanner McKee 1-yard run, Joshua Karty kick (Drive: 7 plays, 67 yards, 3:05; Stanford 7–0)

Second quarter

- (12:49) UTAH – Devaughn Vele 9-yard pass from Cameron Rising, Jadon Redding kick (Drive: 12 plays, 75 yards, 5:51; Tied 7–7)
- (6:44) UTAH – Tavion Thomas 4-yard run, Jadon Redding kick (Drive: 9 plays, 69 yards, 4:23; Utah 14–7)

Third quarter

- (8:49) UTAH – Thomas Yassmin 14-yard pass from Cameron Rising, Jadon Redding kick (Drive: 8 plays, 85 yards, 3:51; Utah 21–7)
- (5:14) UTAH – Micah Bernard 19-yard pass from Cameron Rising, Jadon Redding kick (Drive: 6 plays, 56 yards, 2:39; Utah 28–7)
- (1:37) UTAH – Logan Kendall 16-yard pass from Nate Johnson, Jadon Redding kick (Drive: 4 plays, 72 yards, 2:02; Utah 35–7)

Fourth quarter

- (8:32) UTAH – Tavion Thomas 36-yard run, Jadon Redding kick (Drive: 7 plays, 88 yards, 4:53; Utah 42–7)

Statistics	STAN	UTAH
First downs	9	29
Total yards	177	514
Rushes/yards	26–22	36–279
Passing yards	155	235
Passing: Comp–Att–Int	12–25–0	21–34–1
Time of possession	25:29	34:31

Team	Category	Player	Statistics
Stanford	Passing	Tanner McKee	11/23, 155 yards
Stanford	Rushing	Mitch Leigber	12 carries, 40 yards
Stanford	Receiving	Elijah Higgins	7 receptions, 105 yards
Utah	Passing	Cameron Rising	20/33, 219 yards, 3 TD, INT
Utah	Rushing	Tavion Thomas	22 carries, 180 yards, 2 TD
Utah	Receiving	Devaughn Vele	6 receptions, 61 yards, TD

=== at No. 12 Oregon ===
Overall record	Previous meeting	Previous winner
12–23	December 3, 2021	Utah Utes

No. 10 Utah Utes (8–2) vs No. 12 Oregon Ducks (8–2) – Game summary

Quarter	1	2	3	4	Total
No. 10 Utes	3	0	14	0	17
No. 12 Ducks	7	10	0	3	20

at Autzen Stadium • Eugene, OR

- Date: November 19, 2022
- Game time: 7:30 p.m.
- Game weather: Clear, 35 °F (2 °C)
- Game attendance: 57,009
- Referee: Chris Coyte
- TV announcers (ESPN): Dave Flemming (play-by-play), Rod Gilmore (analyst), Tiffany Blackmon (sideline)

Game information

First quarter

- (10:56) ORE – Bucky Irving 10-yard run, Camden Lewis kick (Drive: 10 plays, 79 yards, 4:04; Oregon 7–0)
- (1:09) UTAH – Jadon Redding 45-yard field goal (Drive: 7 plays, 21 yards, 3:27; Oregon 7–3)

Second quarter

- (10:28) ORE – Troy Franklin 4-yard pass from Bo Nix, Camden Lewis kick (Drive: 8 plays, 52 yards, 3:34; Oregon 14–3)
- (0:18) ORE – Camden Lewis 30-yard field goal (Drive: 7 plays, 77 yards, 2:11; Oregon 17–3)

Third quarter

- (13:14) UTAH – Karene Reid 11-yard fumble return, Jordan Noyes kick (Drive: 1 play, -3 yards, 0:07; Oregon 17–10)
- (2:39) UTAH – Jaylen Dixon 18-yard run, Jadon Redding kick (Drive: 13 plays, 86 yards, 7:00; Tied 17–17)

Fourth quarter

- (11:17) ORE – Camden Lewis 41-yard field goal (Drive: 15 plays, 52 yards, 6:22; Oregon 20–17)

Statistics	UTAH	ORE
First downs	22	16
Total yards	326	346
Rushes/yards	36–156	25–59
Passing yards	170	287
Passing: Comp–Att–Int	21–38–3	25–37–1
Time of possession	33:25	26:35

Team	Category	Player	Statistics
Utah	Passing	Cameron Rising	21/38, 170 yards, 3 INT
Utah	Rushing	Tavion Thomas	19 carries, 55 yards
Utah	Receiving	Dalton Kincaid	11 receptions, 99 yards
Oregon	Passing	Bo Nix	25/37, 287 yards, TD, INT
Oregon	Rushing	Noah Whittington	10 carries, 53 yards
Oregon	Receiving	Dont'e Thornton	4 receptions, 151 yards

=== at Colorado ===
Overall record	Previous meeting	Previous winner
33–32–3	November 26, 2021	Utah Utes

No. 14 Utah Utes (8–3) at Colorado Buffaloes (1–10) – Game summary

Quarter	1	2	3	4	Total
No. 14 Utes	14	28	14	7	63
Buffaloes	0	0	14	7	21

at Folsom Field • Boulder, CO

- Date: November 26, 2022
- Game time: 2:00 p.m. MST
- Game weather: Sunny, 58 °F (14 °C)
- Referee: Francisco Villar
- TV announcers (Pac-12 Network): Ted Robinson (play-by-play), Yogi Roth (analyst)

Game information

First quarter

- (6:35) UTAH – Micah Bernard 8-yard run, Jadon Redding kick (Drive: 8 plays, 59 yards, 4:02; Utah 7–0)
- (2:20) UTAH – Ja'Quinden Jackson 10-yard run, Jadon Redding kick (Drive: 4 plays, 53 yards, 1:51; Utah 14–0)

Second quarter

- (12:34) UTAH – Ja'Quinden Jackson 2-yard run, Jadon Redding kick (Drive: 7 plays, 80 yards, 3:04; Utah 21–0)
- (4:43) UTAH – Thomas Yassmin 41-yard pass from Cameron Rising, Jadon Redding kick (Drive: 2 plays, 54 yards, 0:55; Utah 28–0)
- (0:52) UTAH – Money Parks 9-yard pass from Cameron Rising, Jadon Redding kick (Drive: 7 plays, 67 yards, 3:04; Utah 35–0)
- (0:03) UTAH – Dalton Kincaid 29-yard pass from Cameron Rising, Jadon Redding kick (Drive: 3 plays, 70 yards, 0:25; Utah 42–0)

Third quarter

- (11:47) COL – Alex Fontenot 1-yard run, Cole Becker kick (Drive: 2 plays, 11 yards, 0:38; Utah 42–7)
- (10:49) UTAH – Ja'Quinden Jackson 66-yard run, Jadon Redding kick (Drive: 2 plays, 75 yards, 0:48; Utah 49–7)
- (5:37) UTAH – Makai Cope 21-yard pass from Bryson Barnes, Jadon Redding kick (Drive: 5 plays, 62 yards, 3:12; Utah 56–7)
- (2:59) COL – Anthony Hankerson 23-yard run, Cole Becker kick (Drive: 6 plays, 79 yards, 2:32; Utah 56–14)

Fourth quarter

- (8:34) UTAH – Jaylon Glover 5-yard run, Jadon Redding kick (Drive: 8 plays, 72 yards, 5:31; Utah 63–14)
- (2:46) COL – Frank Fillip 1-yard pass from Maddox Kopp, Cole Becker kick (Drive: 12 plays, 76 yards, 5:42; Utah 63–21)

Statistics	UTAH	COL
First downs	32	12
Total yards	662	185
Rushes/yards	43–383	25–62
Passing yards	279	123
Passing: Comp–Att–Int	21–24–1	15–28–0
Time of possession	35:20	24:40

Team	Category	Player	Statistics
Utah	Passing	Cameron Rising	17/19, 234 yards, 3 TD
Utah	Rushing	Ja'Quinden Jackson	10 carries, 117 yards, 3 TD
Utah	Receiving	Dalton Kincaid	5 receptions, 102 yards, TD
Colorado	Passing	Maddox Kopp	15/28, 123 yards, TD
Colorado	Rushing	Anthony Hankerson	8 carries, 46 yards, TD
Colorado	Receiving	Brady Russell	4 receptions, 39 yards

=== vs No. 4 USC (Pac-12 Championship Game) ===
No. 4 USC Trojans (11–1) vs No. 11 Utah Utes (9–3) – Game summary
(2022 Pac-12 Football Championship Game presented by 76)

Quarter	1	2	3	4	Total
No. 11 Utes	3	14	7	23	47
No. 4 Trojans	14	3	0	7	24

at Allegiant Stadium • Paradise, NV

- Date: December 2, 2022
- Game time: 5:00 p.m.
- Game weather: Indoor, 59 °F (15 °C)
- Game attendance: 61,195
- Referee: Chris Coyte
- TV announcers (FOX): Jason Benetti (play-by-play), Brock Huard (analyst), Allison Williams (sideline)

Game information

1st quarter

- (11:58) USC – Tahj Washington 2-yard pass from Caleb Williams, Denis Lynch kick (Drive: 7 plays, 75 yards, 3:32; USC 7–0)
- (6:22) UTAH – Jadon Redding 25-yard field goal (Drive: 12 plays, 68 yards, 5:06; USC 7–3)
- (3:40) USC – Raleek Brown 3-yard pass from Caleb Williams, Denis Lynch kick (Drive: 6 plays, 75 yards, 3:18; USC 14–3)

2nd quarter

- (12:14) USC – Denis Lynch 20-yard field goal (Drive: 12 plays, 71 yards, 4:45; USC 17–3)
- (4:42) UTAH – Ja'Quinden Jackson 8-yard run, Jadon Redding kick (Drive: 11 plays, 63 yards, 6:39; USC 17–10)
- (0:11) UTAH – Jaylen Dixon 4-yard pass from Cameron Rising, Jadon Redding kick (Drive: 14 plays, 81 yards, 1:44; USC 17–17)

3rd quarter

- (10:48) UTAH – Money Parks 57-yard pass from Cameron Rising, Jadon Redding kick (Drive: 3 plays, 48 yards, 1:03; Utah 24–17)

4th quarter

- (15:00) UTAH – Jadon Redding 35-yard field goal (Drive: 9 plays, 41 yards, 5:15; Utah 27–17)
- (11:37) USC – Mario Williams 12-yard pass from Caleb Williams, Denis Lynch kick (Drive: 9 plays, 75 yards, 4:04; Utah 27–24)
- (10:52 UTAH – Thomas Yassmin 60-yard pass from Cameron Rising, Jadon Redding kick (Drive: 2 plays, 75 yards, 0:44; Utah 34–24)
- (6:18) UTAH – Ja'Quinden Jackson 53-yard run (Drive: 3 plays, 46 yards, 1:38; Utah 40–24)
- (2:39) UTAH – Micah Bernard 23-yard run, Jadon Redding kick (Drive: 3 plays, 38 yards, 1:39; Utah 47-24)

Statistics	UTAH	USC
First downs	25	19
Total yards	533	419
Rushes/yards	35-223	27-56
Passing yards	310	363
Passing: Comp–Att–Int	22-34-0	28-41-1
Time of possession	29:47	30:13

Team	Category	Player	Statistics
Utah	Passing	Cameron Rising	22/34, 310 yards, 3 TD
Utah	Rushing	Ja'Quinden Jackson	13 carries, 105 yards, 2 TD
Utah	Receiving	Money Parks	4 receptions, 88 yards, TD
USC	Passing	Caleb Williams	28/41, 363 yards, 3 TD, INT
USC	Rushing	Austin Jones	15 carries, 35 yards
USC	Receiving	Tahj Washington	6 receptions, 93 yards, TD

=== vs No. 11 Penn State (Rose Bowl) ===
Overall record
First meeting

No. 9 Utah Utes (10–3) vs No. 11 Penn State Nittany Lions (10–2) – Game summary
(2022 Rose Bowl)

Quarter	1	2	3	4	Total
No. 11 Nittany Lions	7	7	7	14	35
No. 9 Utes	0	14	0	7	21

at Rose Bowl • Pasadena, CA

- Date: January 2, 2023
- Game time: 2:00 p.m.
- Game weather: Clear, 53 °F (12 °C)
- Game attendance: 94,873
- Referee: Michael Vandervelde
- TV announcers (ESPN): Chris Fowler (play-by-play), Kirk Herbstreit (color), and Holly Rowe (sideline)
- First quarter
  - (0:07) PSU – Nicholas Singleton 5-yard run, Jake Pinegar kick (Drive: 11 plays, 82 yards, 4:51; Penn State 7–0)
  Second quarter
  - (7:55) UTAH – Thomas Yassmin 1-yard pass from Cameron Rising, Jordan Noyes kick (Drive: 13 plays, 75 yards, 7:12; Tied 7–7)
  - (4:47) PSU – Mitchell Tinsley 10-yard pass from Sean Clifford, Jake Pinegar kick (Drive: 6 plays, 70 yards, 3:08; Penn State 14–7)
  - (2:38) UTAH – Ja'Quinden Jackson 19-yard run, Jordan Noyes kick (Drive: 6 plays, 75 yards, 2:09; Tied 14–14)
  Third quarter
  - (9:25) PSU – Nicholas Singleton 87-yard run, Jake Pinegar kick (Drive: 3 plays, 95 yards, 0:52; Penn State 21–14)
  Fourth quarter
  - (14:49) PSU – KeAndre Lambert-Smith 88-yard pass from Sean Clifford, Jake Pinegar kick (Drive: 3 plays, 94 yards, 1:29; Penn State 28–14)
  - (10:36) PSU – Kaytron Allen 1-yard run, Jake Pinegar kick (Drive: 5 plays, 47 yards, 2:44; Penn State 35–14)
  - (0:25) UTAH – Jaylen Dixon 5-yard pass from Bryson Barnes, Jordan Noyes kick (Drive: 8 plays, 78 yards, 1:47; Penn State 35–21)

Statistics	PSU	UTAH
First downs	15	23
Total yards	448	391
Rushes/yards	31-169	43-184
Passing yards	279	207
Passing: Comp–Att–Int	16-23-0	18-40-2
Time of possession	24:47	35:13

Team	Category	Player	Statistics
Penn State	Passing	Sean Clifford	16/22, 279 yards, 2 TD
Penn State	Rushing	Nicholas Singleton	7 carries, 120 yards, 2 TD
Penn State	Receiving	KeAndre Lambert-Smith	3 receptions, 124 yards, TD
Utah	Passing	Bryson Barnes	10/19, 112 yards, TD, INT
Utah	Rushing	Ja'Quinden Jackson	13 carries, 81 yards, TD
Utah	Receiving	Devaughn Vele	5 receptions, 100 yards

== Rankings ==
Ranking movements Legend: ██ Increase in ranking ██ Decrease in ranking
	Week															
Poll	Pre	1	2	3	4	5	6	7	8	9	10	11	12	13	14	Final
AP	7	13	14	13	12	11	20	15	14	12	13	10	14	12	7	10
Coaches	8	15	15	14	13	11	19	15	14	12	13	10	14	12	10	11
CFP	Not released									14	13	10	14	11	8	Not released
