= Noah Bennee =

American football player

Utah Utes
- Position: Tight end
- Class: Redshirt Senior

Personal information
- Listed height: 6 ft 4 in (1.93 m)
- Listed weight: 240 lb (109 kg)

Career information
- High school: Olympus (Holladay, Utah)
- College: Utah (2021–2023); Weber State (2024–2025); Utah (2026–present)

Awards and highlights
- Second-team All-Big Sky (2025)
- Stats at ESPN

Noah Bennee is an American college football tight end for the Utah Utes. He previously played with the Weber State Wildcats.

== Early life ==
Bennee attended Olympus High School in Holladay, Utah, where he excelled as a two-way player on the football team. As a senior, he posted 35 receptions for 743 yards and 11 touchdowns to go with 37 tackles, nine interceptions, and one defensive touchdown. Bennee was named the Utah 5A Defensive Player of the Year and earned all-state honors at both wide receiver and safety. He also participated in basketball, soccer, volleyball, and track and field.

Coming out of high school, Bennee was an unranked recruit, and did not receive any scholarship offers to play college football. After serving his Latter-Day Saint mission in Colombia, he enrolled at the University of Utah to join the Utes as a walk-on.

== College career ==
Bennee did not play any games during his first two years at Utah in 2021 and 2022. He then appeared in seven games in 2023, mostly on special teams. After the season, Bennee transferred to Weber State University to play for the Wildcats. He signed with the team on the first day of the regular signing period in February 2024. In his first season at Weber State in 2024, Bennee recorded six receptions for 44 yards and a touchdown in 11 games. He scored his first career touchdown on a six-yard catch in a 55–48 overtime win over Montana. Bennee took on a starting role for the Wildcats in 2025. He tallied 23 receptions for 264 yards and five tackles in 11 games, garnering second-team All-Big Sky honors.

After the season, Bennee transferred back to Utah, taking advantage of an extra year of eligibility from an earlier medical redshirt. He was named to the team's leadership council following fall camp. In the 2026 season opener, Bennee caught a 35-yard touchdown – his first as a Ute – in a 66–14 win over Idaho. The following week, he had four catches for a career-high 113 yards and a touchdown in a 43–10 victory over Arkansas.

== Personal life ==
Bennee was born to Peter and Shauna Bennee. His father played rugby at BYU, while his mother competed in volleyball and track and field at the University of Utah. His mother's brother is former Utah and NBA basketball player, Danny Vranes, and her cousin is former NBA player Jeff Judkins.

Bennee grew up as a Utah Utes fan. When he transferred back to Utah in 2026, he became teammates with his younger brother Jackson, a safety on the team. The two lived next door to each other while each raising their own family, with their sons being born five weeks apart. Other siblings include Nik Sonntag, who played on Utah's undefeated 2004 football team, and pro snowboarder Justin Bennee.
