= 2022 Pac-12 Football Championship Game =

- Conference championship
| Utah Utes | USC Trojans |
| (9–3) | (11–1) |
| 47 | 24 |
| Head coach: Kyle Whittingham | Head coach: Lincoln Riley |
| AP / Coaches / CFP; 12 / 12 / 11 | AP / Coaches / CFP; 4 / 4 / 4 |
| | 1 | 2 | 3 | 4 | Total |
|---|---|---|---|---|---|
| Utah | 3 | 14 | 7 | 23 | 47 |
| USC | 14 | 3 | 0 | 7 | 24 |
- Date: December 2, 2022
- Season: 2022
- Stadium: Allegiant Stadium
- Location: Paradise, NV
- MVP: QB Cameron Rising, Utah
- Favorite: USC by 3
- Referee: Chris Coyte
- Attendance: 61,195

United States TV coverage
- Network: Fox; ESPN Radio
- Announcers: Fox: Jason Benetti, Brock Huard and Allison Williams; ESPN Radio: Marc Kestecher, Kelly Stouffer and Ian Fitzsimmons

2022 Pac-12 Conference football standings
| | Conf. | | | Overall |
| Team | W | | L | W | | L |
|---|---|---|---|---|---|---|
| No. 12 USC y | 8 | – | 1 | 11 | – | 3 |
| No. 10 Utah y$ | 7 | – | 2 | 10 | – | 4 |
| No. 8 Washington | 7 | – | 2 | 11 | – | 2 |
| No. 15 Oregon | 7 | – | 2 | 10 | – | 3 |
| No. 17 Oregon State | 6 | – | 3 | 10 | – | 3 |
| No. 21 UCLA | 6 | – | 3 | 9 | – | 4 |
| Washington State | 4 | – | 5 | 7 | – | 6 |
| Arizona | 3 | – | 6 | 5 | – | 7 |
| California | 2 | – | 7 | 4 | – | 8 |
| Arizona State† | 1 | – | 7 | 1 | – | 9 |
| Stanford | 1 | – | 8 | 3 | – | 9 |
| Colorado | 1 | – | 8 | 1 | – | 11 |
Championship: Utah 47, USC 24
$ – Conference champion; y – Championship game participant; Rankings from AP Poll

The 2022 Pac-12 Football Championship Game was a college football game played on December 2, 2022, at Allegiant Stadium in the Las Vegas-area community of Paradise, Nevada. It was the 12th edition of the Pac-12 Football Championship Game, and determined the champion of the Pac-12 Conference for the 2022 season. The game began at 5:00 p.m. PST and aired on Fox. The contest featured the USC Trojans, the team with the best conference record, and the Utah Utes, the team with the second best conference record. Sponsored by gas station chain 76, the game is officially known as the 2022 Pac-12 Football Championship Game presented by 76.

This was the first Pac-12 Football Championship Game to not feature the champions of the North and South Division. The Pac-12 got rid of its divisions following the NCAA Division 1 Council's ruling that conferences could determine the teams participating in its championship game. Utah became the third team in the Conference Championship era to repeat as Pac 12 champions.

== Teams ==
=== USC Trojans ===
The Trojans clinched a spot in the championship game following its defeat of UCLA on November 19.

=== Utah Utes ===
Going into the final week of the conference season (weekend of November 26), the Oregon Ducks, Washington Huskies and Utah Utes were in contention to face USC in the championship game.

Oregon lost 38–34 at Oregon State, leaving the Ducks dependent on a Washington State win to make the title game. Utah, which remained alive going into Saturday's games thanks to UCLA defeating California 35–28 on November 25, defeated Colorado 63–21, eliminating Washington from contention and putting the Utes in position to advance to the title game with a Washington win. With Washington's 51–33 win over Washington State, Utah clinched the second spot to the game. Utah won its first back-to-back conference championship since 2003 and 2004.

== Game summary ==
=== Scoring summary ===
2022 Pac-12 Football Championship Game presented by 76

| Quarter | 1 | 2 | 3 | 4 | Total |
|---|---|---|---|---|---|
| No. 11 Utes | 3 | 14 | 7 | 23 | 47 |
| No. 4 Trojans | 14 | 3 | 0 | 7 | 24 |

at Allegiant Stadium • Paradise, Nevada

- Date: December 2, 2022
- Game time: 5:00 p.m. PST
- Game attendance: 61,195
- Referee: Chris Coyte
- TV announcers (FOX): Jason Benetti, Brock Huard, Allison Williams

Game information

1st quarter

- (11:28) USC – Tahj Washington 2-yard pass from Caleb Williams, Denis Lynch kick (Drive: 7 plays, 75 yards, 3:32; USC 7–0)
- (6:10) UTAH – Jadon Redding 25-yard field goal (Drive: 12 plays, 68 yards, 5:06; USC 7–3)
- (2:52) USC – Raleek Brown 3-yard pass from Caleb Williams, Denis Lynch kick (Drive: 6 plays, 75 yards, 3:18; USC 14–3)

2nd quarter

- (12:08) USC – Denis Lynch 20-yard field goal (Drive: 12 plays, 71 yards, 4:45; USC 17–3)
- (3:55) UTAH – Ja'Quinden Jackson 8-yard run, Jadon Redding kick (Drive: 11 plays, 63 yards, 6:39; USC 17–10)
- (0:02) UTAH – Jaylen Dixon 4-yard pass from Cameron Rising, Jadon Redding kick (Drive: 14 plays, 81 yards, 1:44; USC 17–17)

3rd quarter

- (10:33) UTAH – Money Parks 57-yard pass from Cameron Rising, Jadon Redding kick (Drive: 3 plays, 48 yards, 1:03; Utah 24–17)

4th quarter

- (14:56) UTAH – Jadon Redding 35-yard field goal (Drive: 9 plays, 41 yards, 5:15; Utah 27–17)
- (10:52) USC – Mario Williams 12-yard pass from Caleb Williams, Denis Lynch kick (Drive: 9 plays, 75 yards, 4:04; Utah 27–24)
- (10:08) UTAH – Thomas Yassmin 60-yard pass from Cameron Rising, Jadon Redding kick (Drive: 2 plays, 75 yards, 0:44; Utah 34–24)
- (5:29) UTAH – Ja'Quinden Jackson 53-yard run (Drive: 3 plays, 46 yards, 1:38; Utah 40–24)
- (1:52) UTAH – Micah Bernard 23-yard run, Jadon Redding kick (Drive: 3 plays, 38 yards, 1:39; Utah 47-24)

== Statistics ==
=== Team statistics ===
Team statistical comparison
| Statistic | No. 11 Utah | No. 4 USC |
|---|---|---|
| First downs | 25 | 19 |
| First downs rushing | 11 | 5 |
| First downs passing | 12 | 14 |
| First downs penalty | 2 | 0 |
| Third down efficiency | 5 of 11 | 1 of 12 |
| Fourth down efficiency | 1 of 1 | 3 of 5 |
| Total plays–net yards | 69–533 | 68–419 |
| Rushing attempts–net yards | 35–223 | 27–56 |
| Yards per rush | 6.4 | 2.1 |
| Yards passing | 310 | 363 |
| Pass completions–attempts | 22–34 | 28–41 |
| Interceptions thrown | 1–29 | 0–0 |
| Punt returns–total yards | 0–0 | 0–0 |
| Kickoff returns–total yards | 0–0 | 5–82 |
| Punts–total yardage | 3–131 | 4–166 |
| Fumbles–lost | 2–1 | 2–1 |
| Penalties–yards | 5–45 | 4–39 |
| Time of possession | 29:49 | 30:11 |

=== Individual statistics ===
USC statistics
Trojans passing
| | C–A | Yds | TD | INT |
|---|---|---|---|---|
| Caleb Williams | 28–41 | 363 | 3 | 1 |
Trojans rushing
| | Car | Yds | TD | Avg |
| Austin Jones | 15 | 35 | 0 | 2.3 |
| Caleb Williams | 12 | 21 | 0 | 1.8 |
Trojans receiving
| | Rec | Yds | TD | Avg |
| Tahj Washington | 6 | 93 | 1 | 15.5 |
| Jordan Addison | 5 | 65 | 0 | 13.0 |
| Mario Williams | 3 | 51 | 1 | 17.0 |
| Brenden Rice | 3 | 42 | 0 | 14.0 |
| Austin Jones | 4 | 40 | 0 | 10.0 |
| Kyle Ford | 2 | 38 | 0 | 19.0 |
| Lake McRee | 1 | 15 | 0 | 15.0 |
| Darwin Barlow | 1 | 3 | 0 | 3.0 |
| Raleek Brown | 2 | -1 | 1 | -0.5 |

UTAH statistics
Utes passing
| | C–A | Yds | TD | INT |
|---|---|---|---|---|
| Cameron Rising | 22–34 | 310 | 3 | 0 |
Utes rushing
| | Car | Yds | TD | Avg |
| Ja'Quinden Jackson | 13 | 105 | 2 | 8.1 |
| Micah Bernard | 11 | 88 | 1 | 8.0 |
| Cameron Rising | 8 | 18 | 0 | 2.3 |
| Nate Jackson | 1 | 7 | 0 | 7.0 |
| Jaylen Dixon | 2 | 5 | 0 | 2.5 |
Utes receiving
| | Rec | Yds | TD | Avg |
| Money Parks | 4 | 88 | 1 | 22.0 |
| Thomas Yassmin | 2 | 81 | 1 | 40.5 |
| Jaylen Dixon | 6 | 55 | 1 | 9.2 |
| Micah Bernard | 5 | 41 | 0 | 8.2 |
| Dalton Kincaid | 4 | 40 | 0 | 10.0 |
| Nate Johnson | 1 | 5 | 0 | 5.0 |

== Aftermath ==
USC would drop to #10 in the final College Football Playoff rankings, while the idle Ohio State Buckeyes rose to the #4 to earn a playoff berth. The Trojans were invited to the Cotton Bowl Classic where they lost to AAC Champion Tulane 46–45. Utah played in the Rose Bowl, where they were defeated by Penn State 35–21.

== See also ==
- List of Pac-12 Conference football champions
