= Money Parks =

American football player

No. 10
- Position: Wide receiver

Personal information
- Listed height: 5 ft 9 in (1.75 m)
- Listed weight: 177 lb (80 kg)

Career information
- High school: Aledo (Aledo, Texas)
- College: Utah (2020–2024)
- Stats at ESPN

Monterren "Money" Parks is a former American college football wide receiver for the Utah Utes.

== Early life ==
Parks attended Aledo High School in Aledo, Texas, and committed to play college football for the Utah Utes.

== College career ==
As a freshman in 2020, Parks played in just one game versus USC. In 2021, he appeared in 12 games for the Utes and hauled in one reception for 12 yards and a touchdown. In the 2022 Pac-12 Football Championship Game, Parks hauled in four passes for 88 yards and a 57 yard touchdowns, as he helped the Utes win the Pac-12 Title. In 2022, he appeared in all 14 games, where he made three starts, notching 26 receptions for 414 yards and two touchdowns. In 2023, Parks started in all 13 games for Utah and tallied 31 catches for 293 yards and two touchdowns. In 2024, he hauled in 21 passes for 294 yards and three touchdowns before having his season cut short due to an injury. After the season, Parks declared for the 2025 NFL draft and accepted an invite to participate in the 2025 East-West Shrine Bowl.

== Professional career ==
Pre-draft measurables
Height	Weight	40-yard dash	20-yard shuttle	Three-cone drill	Vertical jump	Broad jump
5 ft 9 1/8 in (1.76 m)	177 lb (80 kg)	4.53 s	4.28 s	7.11 s	36.5 in (0.93 m)	10 ft 7 in (3.23 m)
All values from Pro Day
