= Cameron Rising =

American football coach and former player

No. 7
- Position: Quarterback

Personal information
- Born: May 13, 1999 (age 27); Ventura, California, U.S.
- Listed height: 6 ft 2 in (1.88 m)
- Listed weight: 220 lb (100 kg)

Career information
- High school: Newbury Park (Newbury Park, California)
- College: Texas (2018); Utah (2019–2024)

Awards and highlights
- First-team All-Pac-12 (2021); Pac-12 Championship MVP (2022)
- Stats at ESPN

Cameron James Rising (born May 13, 1999) is an American football coach and former quarterback. Rising played college football for the Texas Longhorns and Utah Utes.

== Early life ==
Rising attended Newbury Park High School in Newbury Park, California. He committed to the University of Texas at Austin to play college football.

== College career ==
Rising redshirted his only year at Texas in 2018. He transferred to the University of Utah in 2019. After redshirting his first year at Utah, Rising competed with Jake Bentley for the starting job in 2020. Although Bentley won the job, Rising was chosen to start against the USC Trojans. During the game, he completed three of six passes for 45 yards with an interception before suffering a shoulder injury which caused him to miss the rest of the season. Rising returned from the injury to compete with Charlie Brewer for the starting job in 2021. Rising again lost the starting quarterback position, but replaced Brewer after two games and started the final 11 games of the season. Overall, he completed 204 of 320 passes for 2,493 yards, 20 touchdowns and five interceptions. On November 19, 2023, Rising announced that he was returning to Utah in 2024. In 2024, Rising injured a finger after being pushed out of bounds during a game against Baylor. He returned on October 11 against Arizona State. Upon his return, Rising injured a leg on the first drive of the game against Arizona State. He played the rest of the game limping. Kyle Wittingham reported the following Monday that due to injury, Rising would be out for the remainder of the season.

=== Statistics ===
Year	Team	Games			Passing								Rushing			
Year	Team	GP	GS	Record	Comp	Att	Pct	Yards	Avg	TD	Int	Rate	Att	Yards	Avg	TD
2018	Texas	Freshman (redshirt)														
2019	Utah	Transfer (redshirt)														
2020	Utah	1	1	0−1	3	6	50.0	45	7.5	0	1	79.7	1	-11	-11.0	0
2021	Utah	13	11	8−3	204	320	63.8	2,493	7.8	20	5	146.7	74	499	6.7	6
2022	Utah	13	13	10−3	249	385	64.7	3,034	7.9	26	8	149.0	77	465	6.0	6
2023	Utah	Medical (redshirt)														
2024	Utah	3	3	2−1	34	66	51.5	555	8.4	7	3	148.1	8	33	4.1	0
Career		30	28	20−8	490	778	63.0	6,127	7.9	53	17	147.2	160	986	6.2	12

== Coaching career ==
Pre-draft measurables
Height	Weight
6 ft 1 5/8 in (1.87 m)	220 lb (100 kg)
All values from Pro Day

On May 7, 2025, Rising announced that he was medically retiring from football. It was subsequently announced that Rising would be joining Newbury Park High School, his alma mater, as the team's offensive coordinator.
