= Dalton Kincaid =

American/Canadian football player (born 1999)

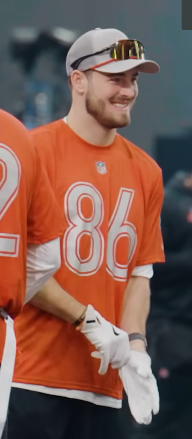
- Kincaid at the 2026 Pro Bowl Games

No. 86 – Buffalo Bills
- Position: Tight end
- Roster status: Active

Personal information
- Born: October 18, 1999 (age 27); Las Vegas, Nevada, U.S.
- Listed height: 6 ft 4 in (1.93 m)
- Listed weight: 246 lb (112 kg)

Career information
- High school: Faith Lutheran (Summerlin, Nevada)
- College: San Diego (2018–2019); Utah (2020–2022)
- NFL draft: 2023: 1st round, 25th overall pick

Career history
- Buffalo Bills (2023–present)

Awards and highlights
- Pro Bowl (2025); First-team All-Pac-12 (2022); Second-team All-PFL (2019)

Career NFL statistics as of Week 10, 2026
- Receptions: 188
- Receiving yards: 2,179
- Receiving touchdowns: 11
- Stats at Pro Football Reference

Dalton Kincaid (born October 18, 1999) is an American professional football tight end for the Buffalo Bills of the National Football League (NFL). He played college football for the San Diego Toreros and Utah Utes and was selected by the Bills in the first round of the 2023 NFL draft.

== Early life ==
Kincaid was born in Las Vegas and is a dual citizen of the United States and Canada. He attended Faith Lutheran High School in Summerlin, Nevada. Growing up, Kincaid mostly played basketball, winning an AAU Championship in his senior year. He would play only one season of high school football, after his friends convinced him to join the team. That season, he would earn all state honors totaling 745 yards and eight touchdowns. He would decide to become a walk-on and play college football at the University of San Diego.

== College career ==
As a freshman in 2018, Kincaid recorded 374 yards and 11 touchdowns on 24 catches. The following season, Kincaid had 44 receptions for 835 yards and eight touchdowns while leading all FCS tight ends in yards per catch. As a result of his performance, he was named an AP FCS All-American and was a part of the Second-team All-Pioneer Football League. Kincaid decided to transfer to the University of Utah in 2020. Kincaid's first season with the Utes was shortened by the COVID-19 pandemic, in which he played in five games. In 2021, he tallied eight touchdowns, 510 yards receiving, and 36 receptions. In 2022, he played in 12 games with 70 receptions, 890 receiving yards and 8 TDs.

== Professional career ==
Pre-draft measurables
Height	Weight	Arm length	Hand span	Wingspan
6 ft 3 5/8 in (1.92 m)	246 lb (112 kg)	32 5/8 in (0.83 m)	10 1/4 in (0.26 m)	6 ft 6 3/8 in (1.99 m)
All values from the NFL Combine

The Buffalo Bills selected Kincaid 25th overall in the 2023 NFL draft after trading up with the Jacksonville Jaguars. Kincaid was the first tight end taken in the draft and the only one selected in the first round. On May 13, Kincaid signed his rookie contract, a four-year deal worth $13.4 million with a fifth-year option.

=== 2023 ===
In week 8, against the Tampa Bay Buccaneers, Kincaid recorded his first career touchdown reception, a 22-yard pass from Josh Allen. He finished the game with five catches for 65 yards as the Bills won 24–18. He recorded his second touchdown, also a 22-yard reception, in a week 10, 22–24 loss against the Denver Broncos. Kincaid overtook the Bills franchise record for most receptions by a rookie, previously held by Sammy Watkins, during the Bills' 27–21 win over the New England Patriots. He finished his rookie year with 73 receptions for 673 yards and two touchdowns. In his playoff debut, Kincaid scored a touchdown in the 31–17 victory over the Steelers in the Wild Card Round.

=== 2024 ===
In week 3, Kincaid recorded his first touchdown this season in the 47–10 victory over the Jacksonville Jaguars. In week 10, Kincaid suffered a knee injury in the 30–20 victory over the Indianapolis Colts. He missed week 11's 30–21 win over Kansas City Chiefs and week 13's matchup against the San Francisco 49ers despite having a bye week to recuperate in week 12. In the 2024 season, he had 44 receptions for 448 yards and two touchdowns in 13 games.

=== 2025 ===
In week 1, Kincaid was targeted four times, catching all four passes for 48 yards and the Buffalo Bills' first touchdown of the 2025 season during their 15-point comeback against the Baltimore Ravens. He would catch touchdown passes in weeks 3 and 4, the first time in his career scoring in back-to-back weeks. After having his first 100-yard game of the season in a week 5 loss to New England, Kincaid caught six passes for 101 yards and one touchdown in week 9 against the Kansas City Chiefs. He became the second tight end in Bills' history (Paul Costa) to record multiple 100-yard performances in a single season. Kincaid finished the 2025 season with 39 receptions for 571 yards and a career-high 5 touchdowns in 12 games.

On January 23, Kincaid was selected to the 2026 Pro Bowl, as a replacement for Chiefs tight end Travis Kelce.

Following the season, it was revealed that Kincaid played the entire 2025 season with a torn PCL, which affected his availability and his snap count throughout the season.

=== 2026 ===
On March 30, the Bills picked up Kincaid's fifth year option for 2027, valued at $8.2 million. In week 1, Kincaid recorded five receptions for 130 receiving yards in a 36–31 win over the Houston Texans, which was the most receiving yards by a Bills tight end since 1967.

== Career statistics ==
=== NFL ===
Legend
**Bold**	Career high

==== Regular season ====
Year	Team	Games		Receiving					Fumbles	
Year	Team	GP	GS	Rec	Yds	Avg	Lng	TD	Fum	Lost
2023	BUF	16	11	**73**	**673**	9.2	51	2	**1**	**1**
2024	BUF	13	9	44	448	10.2	29	2	**1**	0
2025	BUF	12	7	39	571	14.6	47	**5**	**1**	0
2026	BUF	9	9	32	487	**15.2**	**53**	2	**1**	**1**
Career		49	35	188	2,179	11.6	53	11	4	2

==== Postseason ====
Year	Team	Games		Receiving					Fumbles	
Year	Team	GP	GS	Rec	Yds	Avg	Lng	TD	Fum	Lost
2023	BUF	2	2	8	104	**13.0**	29	1	0	0
2024	BUF	2	0	6	71	11.8	**35**	0	0	0
2025	BUF	2	2	**9**	**111**	12.3	25	**2**	0	0
Career		6	4	23	286	12.4	35	3	0	0

=== College ===
Season	Team	Games		Receiving			
Season	Team	GP	GS	Rec	Yards	Avg	TD
2018	San Diego	12	3	24	374	15.6	**11**
2019	San Diego	12	0	44	835	**19.0**	8
2020	Utah	5	1	1	14	14.0	0
2021	Utah	14	13	36	510	14.2	8
2022	Utah	12	8	**70**	**890**	12.7	8
Career		55	25	174	2,606	15.0	35

== Career highlights ==
=== Bills franchise records ===
- Most receptions by a tight end in a single season: 73 (2023)
- Most receptions in a rookie season: 73 (2023)
