= 2023 Cotton Bowl Classic (January) =

Postseason college football bowl game

2023 Goodyear Cotton Bowl Classic
- CFP New Year's Six; 87th Cotton Bowl Classic
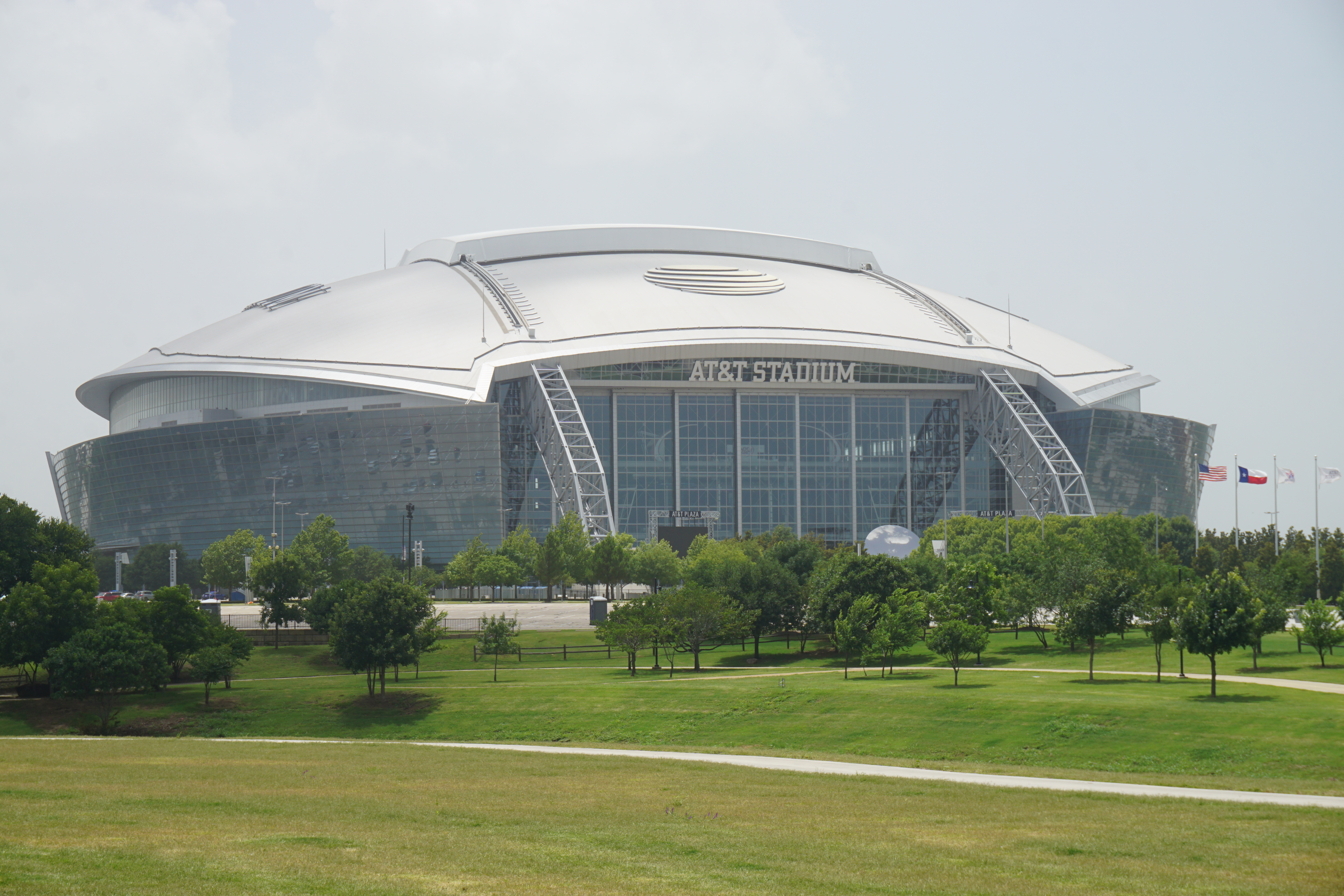
- AT&T Stadium in Arlington, Texas, the site of the Cotton Bowl Classic.
Tulane Green Wave	USC Trojans
(11–2)	(11–2)
AAC	Pac-12
46	45
Head coach: Willie Fritz	Head coach: Lincoln Riley
AP / Coaches / CFP; 14 / 17 / 16	AP / Coaches / CFP; 8 / 8 / 10
	1	2	3	4	Total
Tulane	0	14	16	16	46
USC	7	21	7	10	45
- Date: January 2, 2023
- Season: 2022
- Stadium: AT&T Stadium
- Location: Arlington, Texas
- MVP: Offensive: Tyjae Spears (RB, Tulane); Defensive: Dorian Williams (LB, Tulane)
- Favorite: USC by 2.5
- Referee: Steve Marlowe (SEC)
- Attendance: 55,329

United States TV coverage
- Network: ESPN
- Announcers: Mark Jones (play-by-play), Robert Griffin III (analyst), and Quint Kessenich (sideline)

International TV coverage
- Network: ESPN Deportes
- Announcers: Javier Trejo Garay and Ramiro Pruneda

The 2023 Cotton Bowl Classic was a college football bowl game played on January 2, 2023, at AT&T Stadium in Arlington, Texas. The 87th annual Cotton Bowl Classic, the game featured two teams selected at-large by the College Football Playoff selection committee — Tulane from the American Athletic Conference and USC from the Pac-12 Conference. The game began at 12:00 p.m. CST and was aired on ESPN. It was one of the 2022–23 bowl games concluding the 2022 FBS football season. Sponsored by the Goodyear Tire and Rubber Company, the game was officially known as the Goodyear Cotton Bowl Classic.

== Teams ==
The game featured at-large teams selected by the College Football Playoff (CFP) selection committee. Tulane qualified as the highest-ranked team from the Group of Five conferences.

This was the fourth meeting between the two teams and their first since 1946; USC led the all-time series, 2–1. One of their meetings came in the 1932 Rose Bowl, where USC defeated Tulane to win the national championship. This was USC's third Cotton Bowl, they were 1–1 in previous appearances. This was Tulane's first Cotton Bowl.

=== Tulane Green Wave ===
Tulane played to a 10–2 regular-season record (7–1 in conference). They faced two ranked teams, defeating Cincinnati and losing to UCF. Their only other loss was to Southern Miss. The Green Wave qualified for the AAC Championship Game, where they defeated a ranked UCF in a rematch. Tulane entered the Cotton Bowl with an 11–2 overall record.

=== USC Trojans ===
USC compiled an 11–1 record during the regular season (8–1 in conference). Their only loss was to Utah in mid-October. In addition to Utah, USC faced ranked teams UCLA and Notre Dame, defeating the latter two. The Trojans qualified for the Pac-12 Championship Game, where they lost to Utah in a rematch. USC entered the Cotton Bowl with an overall 11–2 record.

== Game summary ==
USC had a lead of 14–0 that quickly evaporated, but led 28–14 at halftime. The game tightened again in the second half but USC kicked a field goal with just 4:30 left in the game to extend their lead to 45–30. Tulane responded by taking just 23 seconds to cut the lead to 45–37, and then registered a safety with 3:20 left to cut the lead to 45–39. Tulane then converted a pair of fourth downs on a 12-play, 66-yard drive, scoring the winning touchdown with just 9 seconds left in the game. With 4:30 remaining in the game and a 15-point lead, USC's win probability stood at 99.8%.

2023 Goodyear Cotton Bowl Classic

Quarter	1	2	3	4	Total
No. 16 Tulane	0	14	16	16	46
No. 10 USC	7	21	7	10	45

at AT&T Stadium • Arlington, Texas

- Date: Monday, January 2, 2023
- Game time: 12:00 p.m. CST
- Game weather: Indoor
- Game attendance: 55,329
- Referee: Steve Marlowe
- TV announcers (ESPN): Mark Jones (play-by-play), Robert Griffin III (analyst), and Quint Kessenich (sideline)
- Box score

Scoring summary

Quarter	Time	Drive			Team	Scoring information	Score	
Quarter	Time	Plays	Yards	TOP	Team	Scoring information	Tulane	USC
1	5:58	17	75	9:02	USC	Michael Jackson III 9-yard touchdown reception from Caleb Williams, Denis Lynch kick good	0	7
2	12:33	12	95	5:13	USC	Terrell Bynum 3-yard touchdown reception from Caleb Williams, Denis Lynch kick good	0	14
2	9:30	8	75	3:03	Tulane	Tyjae Spears 3-yard touchdown run, Valentino Ambrosio kick good	7	14
2	5:42	2	92	0:50	Tulane	Jha'Quan Jackson 87-yard touchdown reception from Michael Pratt, Valentino Ambrosio kick good	14	14
2	2:21	6	75	3:21	USC	Raleek Brown 39-yard touchdown run, Denis Lynch kick good	14	21
2	0:12	6	68	1:07	USC	Brenden Rice 4-yard touchdown reception from Caleb Williams, Denis Lynch kick good	14	28
3	11:55	7	76	3:05	Tulane	Tyjae Spears 7-yard touchdown run, Valentino Ambrosio kick good	21	28
3	4:02	7	40	3:06	Tulane	42-yard field goal by Valentino Ambrosio	24	28
3	1:24	5	97	2:38	USC	Brenden Rice 19-yard touchdown reception from Caleb Williams, Denis Lynch kick good	24	35
3	0:40	3	65	0:44	Tulane	Tyjae Spears 3-yard touchdown run, 2-point pass failed	30	35
4	12:09	7	47	3:31	USC	Kyron Hudson 4-yard touchdown reception from Caleb Williams, Denis Lynch kick good	30	42
4	4:30	11	46	6:16	USC	43-yard field goal by Denis Lynch	30	45
4	4:07	2	63	0:23	Tulane	Tyjae Spears 4-yard touchdown run, Valentino Ambrosio kick good	37	45
4	3:20				Tulane	Austin Jones tackled in end zone for a safety by Patrick Jenkins	39	45
4	0:09	12	66	3:11	Tulane	Alex Bauman 6-yard touchdown reception from Michael Pratt, Valentino Ambrosio kick good	46	45
"TOP" = time of possession. For other American football terms, see Glossary of American football.							46	45

With the win, Tulane finished their season with an overall 12–2 record, a 10-win improvement over their prior season—the biggest single-season improvement in NCAA football history.

== Statistics ==
Team statistical comparison
Statistic	Tulane	USC
First downs	16	29
First downs rushing	9	6
First downs passing	6	22
First downs penalty	1	1
Third down efficiency	3–8	11–15
Fourth down efficiency	2–2	2–2
Total plays–net yards	52–539	84–594
Rushing attempts–net yards	34–305	32–132
Yards per rush	9.0	4.1
Yards passing	234	462
Pass completions–attempts	8–18	37–52
Interceptions thrown	0	1
Punt returns–total yards	0–0	1–1
Kickoff returns–total yards	6–146	5–67
Punts–average yardage	2–43.0	0–0
Fumbles–lost	1–1	2–0
Penalties–yards	4–30	5–37
Time of possession	20:11	39:49

Tulane statistics
Green Wave passing
	C–A	Yds	TD–INT
Michael Pratt	8–17	234	2–0
Team	0–1	0	0–0
Green Wave rushing
	Car	Yds	TD
Tyjae Spears	17	205	4
Michael Pratt	15	83	0
Shaadie Clayton-Johnson	1	19	0
Team	1	-2	0
Green Wave receiving
	Rec	Yds	TD
Jha'Quan Jackson	1	87	1
Duece Watts	2	83	0
Alex Bauman	3	46	1
Tyjae Spears	1	14	0
Reggie Brown	1	4	0

USC statistics
Trojans passing
	C–A	Yds	TD–INT
Caleb Williams	37–52	462	5–1
Trojans rushing
	Car	Yds	TD
Raleek Brown	6	61	1
Austin Jones	22	61	0
Caleb Williams	4	10	0
Trojans receiving
	Rec	Yds	TD
Brenden Rice	6	174	2
Tahj Washington	5	109	0
Mario Williams	6	35	0
Michael Jackson III	4	31	1
Terrell Bynum	3	26	1
Raleek Brown	2	24	0
Kyron Hudson	4	23	1
Austin Jones	4	20	0
Kyle Ford	2	19	0
John Jackson III	1	3	0
Caleb Williams	0	-2	0
