= 2022 USC Trojans football team =

American college football season

2022 USC Trojans football

Pac-12 Championship Game, L 24–47 vs. Utah

Cotton Bowl Classic, L 45–46 vs. Tulane
- Conference: Pac-12 Conference

Ranking
- Coaches: No. 13
- AP: No. 12
- Record: 11–3 (8–1 Pac-12)
- Head coach: Lincoln Riley (1st season)
- Offensive coordinator: Josh Henson (1st season)
- Offensive scheme: Air raid
- Defensive coordinator: Alex Grinch (1st season)
- Base defense: 3–4
- Captains: Caleb Williams; Justin Dedich; Tuli Tuipulotu; Shane Lee
- Home stadium: Los Angeles Memorial Coliseum

Uniform
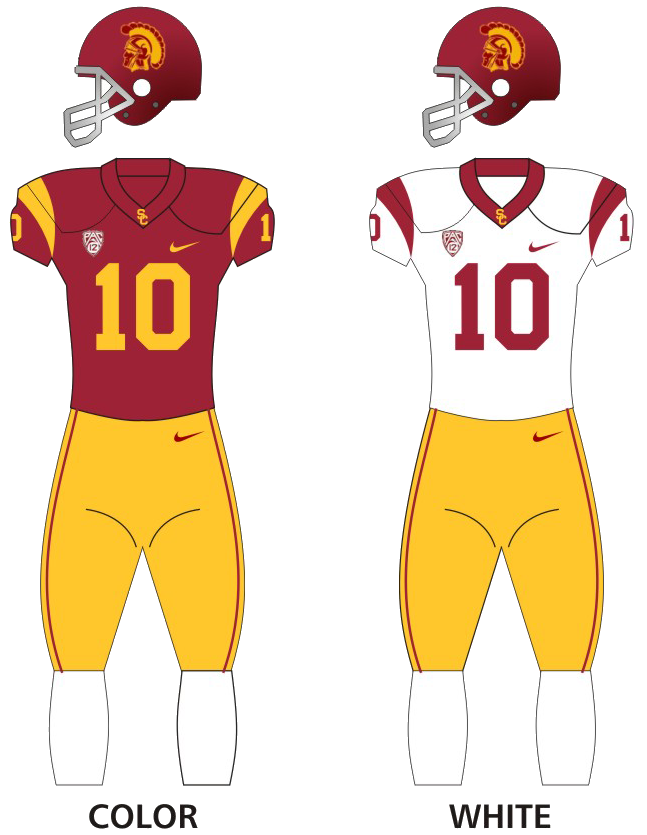

2022 Pac-12 Conference football standings
	Conf.			Overall
Team	W		L	W		L
No. 12 USC y	8	–	1	11	–	3
No. 10 Utah y$	7	–	2	10	–	4
No. 8 Washington	7	–	2	11	–	2
No. 15 Oregon	7	–	2	10	–	3
No. 17 Oregon State	6	–	3	10	–	3
No. 21 UCLA	6	–	3	9	–	4
Washington State	4	–	5	7	–	6
Arizona	3	–	6	5	–	7
California	2	–	7	4	–	8
Arizona State†	2	–	7	3	–	9
Stanford	1	–	8	3	–	9
Colorado	1	–	8	1	–	11
Championship: Utah 47, USC 24
$ – Conference champion; y – Championship game participant; Rankings from AP Poll

The 2022 USC Trojans football team represented the University of Southern California as a member of the Pac-12 Conference during the 2022 NCAA Division I FBS football season. Led by first-year head coach Lincoln Riley, the Trojans played their home games at the Los Angeles Memorial Coliseum in Los Angeles. They finished the season 11–3, 8–1 in Pac-12 play to earn a trip to the Pac-12 championship game. Ranked No. 4 in the College Football Playoff, they lost to Utah in the conference championship game eliminating them from national championship consideration. They received a bid to the Cotton Bowl Classic where they lost to No. 16-ranked Tulane. Trojans quarterback Caleb Williams was awarded the Heisman Trophy for his performances during the season.

== Offseason ==
=== Coaching staff departures ===
Name	Position	New Team	New Position
Clay Helton	Head coach	Georgia Southern	Head coach
Graham Harrell	Offensive coordinator	West Virginia	Offensive coordinator / quarterbacks
Todd Orlando	Defensive coordinator	Florida Atlantic	Defensive coordinator / safeties
Sean Snyder	Special teams coordinator	Illinois	Special teams coordinator
Mike Jinks	Tailbacks coach	Houston	Tailbacks coach
Keary Colbert	Wide receiver coach	Florida	Assistant coach / wide receivers
Seth Doege	Tight end coach	Ole Miss	Offensive analyst
Clay McGuire	Offensive line coach	Washington State	Offensive line coach
Vic So'oto	Defensive line coach	California	Outside linebackers coach
Michael Hutchings	Linebackers coordinator	Western Kentucky	Outside linebackers coach
Craig Naivar	Safeties coach	SMU	Special teams coordinator / safeties coach
Robert Stiner Jr.	Director of football sports performance	Georgia Southern	Head strength & conditioning coach
C. J. Ah You	Defensive Quality Control Analyst	Texas Tech	Outside linebackers

=== Transfers ===
==== Transfers out ====
The Trojans lost 27 players via transfer.

Name	Pos.	Height	Weight	Year	Hometown	New school
Jaxson Dart	QB	6’3	215	Freshman	Kaysville, UT	Ole Miss
Bru McCoy	WR	6’3	220	(redshirt) Sophomore	Palos Verdes Estates, CA	Tennessee
Chase Williams	DB	6’2	200	(redshirt) Junior	Corona, CA	San José State
Michael Trigg	TE	6’4	245	Freshman	Tampa, FL	Ole Miss
Kedon Slovis	QB	6’3	205	Junior	Scottsdale, AZ	Pittsburgh
Joseph Manjack IV	WR	6'3	205	Freshman	Tomball, TX	Houston
Zach Wilson	WR	6'1	210	(redshirt) Junior	Scottsdale, AZ	–
Raymond Scott	LB	6’2	235	(redshirt) Junior	Los Angeles, CA	Fresno State
Dorian Hewett	CB	6’0	180	Junior	Houston, TX	–
Kenan Christon	TB	5’10	185	Junior	San Diego, CA	San Diego State
Brandon Campbell	TB	5’11	210	Freshman	Houston, TX	Houston
Hunter Echols	OLB	6'5	245	(redshirt) Senior	Los Angeles, CA	Arizona
Eli'jah Winston	LB	6'3	230	(redshirt) Senior	Portland, OR	Nevada
Kaulana Makaula	LB/S	6'3	220	(redshirt) Sophomore	Kailua, HI	Hawaii
Juliano Falaniko	OLB	6'4	230	(redshirt) Senior	Pago Pago, AS	Idaho
Ishmael Sopsher	DL	6’4	330	(redshirt) Junior	Amite, LA	Southwest Mississippi C.C.
Parker Lewis	K	6'3	205	Sophomore	Phoenix, AZ	Ohio State
Casey Collier	OT	6’7	300	(redshirt) Freshman	Baytown, TX	Oklahoma State
Spencer Gilbert	LB	6'0	220	(redshirt) Junior	Madison, AL	–
Danny Lockhart Jr.	LB	6’0	225	(redshirt) Freshman	Redlands, CA	Ole Miss
Maximus Gibbs	OL	6’7	390	Freshman	Norwalk, CA	Jackson State
Damian Lopez	OL	6’5	315	(redshirt) Junior	San Pedro, CA	
Liam Douglass	OL	6’5	305	(redshirt) Senior	Topanga, CA	UCLA
Ty Buchanan	OL	6’6	285	Freshman	Corpus Christi, TX	Texas Tech
Chase Locke	WR	6'3	195	(redshirt) Sophomore	San Antonio, TX	Wyoming
Maninoa Tufono	DL/LB	6'3	290	(redshirt) Sophomore	Halawa, HI	
Jacob Lichtenstein	DL	6'6	270	(redshirt) Junior	Weston, FL	Miami

==== Transfers in ====
The Trojans added 23 players via transfer.

Name	Pos.	Height	Weight	Year	Hometown	Old school
Jordan Addison	WR	6’0	175	Junior	Frederick, MD	Pittsburgh
Sinjun Astani	DL	6’4	261	(redshirt) Junior	Malibu, CA	San José State
Earl Barquet Jr.	DL	6’3	277	(redshirt) Sophomore	Marrero, LA	TCU
Mekhi Blackmon	CB	6’0	175	Senior	East Palo Alto, CA	Colorado
Terrell Bynum	WR	6’1	190	Senior	Long Beach, CA	Washington
Solomon Byrd	DL	6’4	249	Junior	Palmdale, CA	Wyoming
Jacobe Covington	DB	6’2	195	(redshirt) Freshman	Chandler, AZ	Washington
Travis Dye	TB	5’10	190	Senior	Norco, CA	Oregon
Eric Gentry	LB	6’6	205	Freshman	Philadelphia, PA	Arizona State
Bobby Haskins	OT	6’7	295	Senior	Princeton, NJ	Virginia
Romello Height	OLB	6’5	220	Sophomore	Dublin, GA	Auburn
Jake Jensen	QB	6’2	210	Sophomore	Pleasant Grove, UT	Contra Costa College
Austin Jones	TB	5’10	190	Junior	Antioch, CA	Stanford
Shane Lee	LB	6’0	240	Senior	Burtonsville, MD	Alabama
Cooper Lovelace	OL	6’5	320	(redshirt) Sophomore	Kansas City, KS	Butler C.C.
Latrell McCutchin	CB	6’1	185	Freshman	Austin, TX	Oklahoma
Brenden Rice	WR	6’3	205	Freshman	Chandler, AZ	Colorado
Bryson Shaw	S	6’0	195	(redshirt) Junior	Eldersburg, MD	Ohio State
Carson Tabaracci	LB	6’2	225	Freshman	Park City, UT	Utah
Tyrone Taleni	DL	6’2	275	Junior	Savaiʻi, Samoa	Kansas State
Garth White	K/P	6’4	200	Freshman	Westlake, CA	Ventura C.C.
Caleb Williams	QB	6’1	218	Freshman	Washington, D.C.	Oklahoma
Mario Williams	WR	5’9	186	Freshman	Tampa, FL	Oklahoma

=== Returning starters ===
Key departures include :
Vavae Malepeai (TB – 12 games, 5 started).
Keaontay Ingram (TB – 10 games, 7 started).
Drake London (WR – 8 games, 8 started).
Erik Krommenhoek (TE – 12 games, 10 started).
Jalen McKenzie (OT – 12 games, 6 started).
Liam Jimmons (OG – 12 games, 12 started).
Kana'i Mauga (LB – 12 games, 12 started).
Drake Jackson (OLB – 11 games, 9 started).
Chris Steele (CB – 11 games, 11 started).
Isaac Taylor-Stuart (CB – 11 games, 10 started).
Isaiah Pola-Mao (S – 11 games, 9 started).
Greg Johnson (S – 10 games, 9 started).
Ben Griffiths (P – 12 games, 12 started).
Parker Lewis (K – 10 games, 10 started).
Damon Johnson (LS – 12 games, 12 started).

Other departures include :
Kedon Slovis (QB – 9 games, 9 started).
Jaxson Dart (QB – 6 games, 3 started).
KD Nixon (WR – 10 games).
Michael Trigg (TE – 6 games, 4 started).
Jacob Lichtenstein (DL – 12 games, 8 started).
Hunter Echols (OLB – 11 games, 3 started).
Raymond Scott (LB – 11 games, 3 started).
Chase Williams (S – 12 games, 9 started).

Offense

Player	Position	Games started
Darwin Barlow	Tailback	1 game
Tahj Washington	Wide receiver	11 games
Gary Bryant Jr.	Wide receiver	7 games
Michael Jackson III	Wide receiver	1 game
Michael Epps	Tight end	5 games
Jude Wolfe	Tight end	1 game
Lake McRee	Tight end	1 game
Brett Neilon	Center	12 games
Andrew Vorhees	Offensive guard	12 games
Courtland Ford	Offensive tackle	8 games
Jonah Monheim	Offensive tackle	6 games
Justin Dedich	Offensive guard	4 games

Defense

Player	Position	Games started
Tuli Tuipulotu	Defensive line	12 games
Stanley Ta’ufo’ou	Defensive line	9 games
Nick Figueroa	Defensive line	8 games
Jamar Sekona	Defensive line	1 game
De’jon Benton	Defensive line	1 game
Ralen Goforth	Linebacker	8 games
Joshua Jackson Jr.	Cornerback	2 games
Prophet Brown	Cornerback	1 game
Calen Bullock	Safety	6 games
Xavion Alford	Safety	2 games
Chris Thompson Jr.	Safety	2 games
Jaylin Smith	Safety	1 game

Special teams

Player	Position	Games started
Alex Stadthaus	Kicker	2 games

† Indicates player was a starter in 2021 but missed all of 2022 due to injury.

=== Recruiting class ===
The Trojans signed a total of yet scholarship recruits and walk-ons during national signing period.

==== Overall class rankings ====
Website	Overall rank	Conference rank	5 star recruits	4 star recruits	3 star recruits	2 star recruits
ESPN	–	–	1	4	1	0
On3 Recruits	30	3	1	4	3	0
Rivals	63	9	2	3	2	0
247 Sports	59	8	2	3	2	1

==== Recruits ====
College recruiting (2022)
Name	Hometown	School	Height	Weight	Commit date
Domani Jackson #2 CB #7 nat.	Santa Ana, CA	Mater Dei HS	6 ft 1 in (1.85 m)	190 lb (86 kg)	December 17, 2021 (Committed) / December 17, 2021 (Signed)
Domani Jackson #2 CB #7 nat.	Recruit ratings: 247Sports: On3: ESPN: (92)				
Raleek Brown #2 TB #33 nat.	Santa Ana, CA	Mater Dei HS	5 ft 8 in (1.73 m)	185 lb (84 kg)	December 2, 2021 (Committed) / December 15, 2021 (Signed)
Raleek Brown #2 TB #33 nat.	Recruit ratings: 247Sports: On3: ESPN: (86)				
Zion Branch #6 S #47 nat.	Las Vegas, NV	Bishop Gorman HS	6 ft 2 in (1.88 m)	195 lb (88 kg)	December 15, 2021 (Committed) / December 15, 2021 (Signed)
Zion Branch #6 S #47 nat.	Recruit ratings: 247Sports: On3: ESPN: (85)				
CJ Williams #11 WR #76 nat.	Santa Ana, CA	Mater Dei HS	6 ft 2 in (1.88 m)	193 lb (88 kg)	January 8, 2022 (Committed) / December 15, 2021 (Signed)
CJ Williams #11 WR #76 nat.	Recruit ratings: 247Sports: On3: ESPN: (83)				
Fabian Ross #28 CB #234 nat.	Las Vegas, NV	Bishop Gorman HS	6 ft 0 in (1.83 m)	185 lb (84 kg)	January 4, 2021 (Committed) / December 15, 2021 (Signed)
Fabian Ross #28 CB #234 nat.	Recruit ratings: 247Sports: On3: ESPN: (82)				
Devan Thompkins #40 EDGE #609 nat.	Stockton, CA	Edison HS	6 ft 5 in (1.96 m)	230 lb (100 kg)	November 19, 2021 (Committed) / December 15, 2021 (Signed)
Devan Thompkins #40 EDGE #609 nat.	Recruit ratings: 247Sports: On3: ESPN: (77)				
Garrison Madden #89 LB #949 nat.	Hampton, GA	Dutchtown HS	6 ft 2 in (1.88 m)	200 lb (91 kg)	December 15, 2021 (Committed) / December 15, (Signed)
Garrison Madden #89 LB #949 nat.	Recruit ratings: 247Sports: On3:				
Daniel Meunier; JuCo LS	Los Angeles, CA	El Camino College	6 ft 1 in (1.85 m)	230 lb (100 kg)	Walk-On
Daniel Meunier; JuCo LS	Recruit ratings: On3:				
Keegan Patterson; QB	Longmont, CO	Longmont HS	6 ft 0 in (1.83 m)	185 lb (84 kg)	Walk-On
Keegan Patterson; QB	Recruit ratings: No ratings found				
Gage Roy; QB	Dallas, TX	Jesuit HS	6 ft 2 in (1.88 m)	185 lb (84 kg)	Walk-On
Gage Roy; QB	Recruit ratings: No ratings found				
Austin Overn; WR	Santa Ana, California	Foothill High School	5 ft 11 in (1.80 m)	170 lb (77 kg)	Walk-On
Austin Overn; WR	Recruit ratings: Rivals: 247Sports: On3: ESPN: (–)				
Kilian O’Connor; OL	Ladera Ranch, California	Santa Margarita Catholic High School	6 ft 2 in (1.88 m)	275 lb (125 kg)	Walk-On
Kilian O’Connor; OL	Recruit ratings: Rivals: 247Sports: On3: ESPN: (–)				
Roman Marchetti; LB	Santa Ana, CA	Foothill HS	6 ft 2 in (1.88 m)	205 lb (93 kg)	Walk-On
Roman Marchetti; LB	Recruit ratings: No ratings found				
Garrett Pomerantz; LB	Las Vegas, NV	Bishop Gorman HS	6 ft 4 in (1.93 m)	210 lb (95 kg)	Walk-On
Garrett Pomerantz; LB	Recruit ratings: No ratings found				
Overall recruit ranking: Scout: – 247Sports: 70 On3: 43
Note: In many cases, Scout, Rivals, 247Sports, On3, and ESPN may conflict in their listings of height and weight.; In these cases, the average was taken. ESPN grades are on a 100-point scale.; Sources: "2022 Team Ranking". Rivals.com.

== Preseason ==
=== Spring Game ===
USC Offense vs USC Defense Spring Game

Quarter	1	2	Total
Defense	21	9	30
Offense	17	17	34

at Los Angeles Memorial Coliseum, Los Angeles, CA

- Date: April 23, 2022
- Game time: 12:00pm PDT
- TV: ESPN

=== Award watch lists ===
Listed in the order that they were released

Award	Player	Position	Year
Lott Trophy	Nick Figueroa	DL	(redshirt) Sr
Lott Trophy	Shane Lee	ILB	Sr
Maxwell Award	Jordan Addison	WR	Jr
Maxwell Award	Caleb Williams	QB	So
Davey O'Brien Award	Caleb Williams	QB	So
Doak Walker Award	Travis Dye	RB	(redshirt) Sr
Doak Walker Award	Austin Jones	RB	Sr
Biletnikoff Award	Jordan Addison	WR	Jr
Rimington Trophy	Brett Neilon	C	(redshirt) Sr
John Mackey Award	Michael Epps	TE	(redshirt) Sr
Outland Trophy	Tuli Tuipulotu	DL	Jr
Outland Trophy	Andrew Vorhees	OL	(redshirt) Sr
Bronko Nagurski Trophy	Tuli Tuipulotu	DL	Jr
Paul Hornung Award	Brenden Rice	WR	Jr
Wuerffel Trophy	Caleb Williams	QB	So
Walter Camp Award	Jordan Addison	WR	Jr
Walter Camp Award	Caleb Williams	QB	So
Bednarik Award	Tuli Tuipulotu	DL	Jr
Rotary Lombardi Award	Tuli Tuipulotu	DL	Jr
Rotary Lombardi Award	Andrew Vorhees	OL	(redshirt) Sr
Earl Campbell Tyler Rose Award	Malcolm Epps	TE	(redshirt) Sr
Earl Campbell Tyler Rose Award	Courtland Ford	OL	(redshirt) So
Polynesian College Football Player Of The Year Award	Brandon Pili	DL	(redshirt) Sr
Polynesian College Football Player Of The Year Award	Stanley Ta’ufo’ou	OL	(redshirt) Jr
Polynesian College Football Player Of The Year Award	Tuli Tuipulotu	DL	Jr
Ted Hendricks Award			

=== Pac-12 Media Day ===
The Pac-12 Media Day was held on July 29, 2022 in Hollywood, California with Lincoln Riley (HC), Caleb Williams (QB) and Shane Lee (LB) representing USC.

Media poll
Predicted finish	Team	Votes (1st place)
1	Utah	26
2	Oregon	2
3	USC	5
4	UCLA	–
5	Oregon State	–
6	Washington	–
7	Washington State	–
8	Stanford	–
9	California	–
10	Arizona State	–
11	Arizona	–
12	Colorado	—

=== Preseason All-Pac-12 teams ===
First team

Position	Player	Class	Team
First Team Offense
QB	Caleb Williams	SO	USC
WR	Jordan Addison	JR	USC
WR	Mario Williams	SO	USC
OL	Andrew Vorhees	(redshirt) SR	USC
First Team Defense
DL	Tuli Tuipulotu	JR	USC
First Team Special teams
AP/ST	Travis Dye	(redshirt) SR	USC

Second team

Position	Player	Class	Team
Second Team Offense
RB	Travis Dye	(redshirt) SR	USC
OL	Brett Neilon	(redshirt) SR	USC
Second Team Defense
DB	Mekhi Blackmon	(redshirt) SR	USC
Second Team Special teams
RS	Gary Bryant Jr.	JR	USC

All-Pac-12 Honorable Mention

Position	Player	Class	Team
Offense
WR	Gary Bryant Jr.	WR	USC
Defense
DL	Nick Figueroa	(redshirt) SR	USC
DL	Solomon Byrd	SR	USC
LB	Korey Foreman	SO	USC
DB	Xavion Alford Jr.	(redshirt) SO	USC
Special teams
RS	Brenden Rice	JR	USC

== Schedule ==
Date	Time	Opponent	Rank	Site	TV	Result	Attendance
September 3	3:00 p.m.	Rice*	No. 14	Los Angeles Memorial Coliseum; Los Angeles, CA	P12N	W 66–14	60,113
September 10	4:30 p.m.	at Stanford	No. 10	Stanford Stadium; Stanford, CA (rivalry)	ABC	W 41–28	43,813
September 17	7:30 p.m.	Fresno State*	No. 7	Los Angeles Memorial Coliseum; Los Angeles, CA	FOX	W 45–17	67,226
September 24	6:30 p.m.	at Oregon State	No. 7	Reser Stadium; Corvallis, OR	P12N	W 17–14	28,769
October 1	7:30 p.m.	Arizona State	No. 6	Los Angeles Memorial Coliseum; Los Angeles, CA	ESPN	W 42–25	62,133
October 8	4:30 p.m.	Washington State	No. 6	Los Angeles Memorial Coliseum; Los Angeles, CA	FOX	W 30–14	63,204
October 15	5:00 p.m.	at No. 20 Utah	No. 7	Rice–Eccles Stadium; Salt Lake City, UT	FOX	L 42–43	53,609
October 29	4:00 p.m.	at Arizona	No. 10	Arizona Stadium; Tucson, AZ	P12N	W 45–37	44,006
November 5	7:30 p.m.	California^{†}	No. 9	Los Angeles Memorial Coliseum; Los Angeles, CA	ESPN	W 41–35	64,916
November 11	6:30 p.m.	Colorado	No. 8	Los Angeles Memorial Coliseum; Los Angeles, CA	FS1	W 55–17	61,206
November 19	5:00 p.m.	at No. 16 UCLA	No. 7	Rose Bowl; Pasadena, CA (Victory Bell)	FOX	W 48–45	70,865
November 26	4:30 p.m.	No. 15 Notre Dame*	No. 6	Los Angeles Memorial Coliseum; Los Angeles, CA (rivalry)	ABC	W 38–27	72,613
December 2	5:00 p.m.	vs. No. 11 Utah	No. 4	Allegiant Stadium; Paradise, NV (Pac-12 Championship Game)	FOX	L 24–47	61,195
January 2, 2023	10:00 a.m.	vs. No. 16 Tulane*	No. 10	AT&T Stadium; Arlington, TX (Cotton Bowl Classic)	ESPN	L 45–46	55,329
*Non-conference game; ^{†}Homecoming; Rankings from AP Poll (and CFP Rankings, after November 1) – Released prior to game; All times are in Pacific time

== Personnel ==
=== Roster ===
2022 USC Trojans football team roster
Players
Coaches
Offense

Pos.	#	Name	Class
WR	0	Terrell Bynum	Sr
WR	1	Gary Bryant Jr.	Jr
WR	2	Brenden Rice	Jr
WR	3	Jordan Addison	Jr
WR	4	Mario Williams	So
RB	6	Austin Jones	Sr
QB	7	Miller Moss	Fr
WR	8	C. J. Williams	Fr
WR	9	Michael Jackson III	So
WR	10	Kyron Hudson	Fr
QB	13	Caleb Williams	So
RB	14	Raleek Brown	Fr
QB	15	Mo Hasan	Sr
WR	16	Tahj Washington	Jr
QB	17	Jake Jensen	So
TE	18	Jude Wolfe	Jr
TE	19	Malcolm Epps	Sr
RB	22	Darwin Barlow	Jr
RB	26	Travis Dye	Sr
QB	28	Gage Roy	Fr
QB	29	Keegan Patterson	Fr
QB	31	Isaac Ward	So
RB	34	Matt Colombo	So
WR	40	Ty Shamblin	So
RB	41	Brandon Outlaw	Sr
WR	42	Danny Ryan	So
WR	44	Josiah Zamora	Fr
WR	46	Corey Nerhus	Jr
RB	47	Christian Catlin	Jr
WR	49	Grant Zane	Fr
OL	56	Andres Dewerk	So
OL	57	Justin Dedich	Sr
OL	61	Joe Bryson	Sr
OL	62	Brett Neilon	Sr
OL	64	A. J. Mageo	Sr
OL	66	Gino Quinones	Jr
OL	67	Kilian O'Connor	Fr
OL	70	Bobby Haskins	Sr
OL	71	Cooper Lovelace	Jr
OL	72	Andrew Vorhees	Sr
OL	73	Caadyn Stephen	So
OL	74	Courtland Ford	So
OL	75	Grant Tucker	Jr
OL	76	Mason Murphy	Fr
OL	77	Jason Rodriguez	Jr
OL	78	Andrew Milek	So
OL	79	Jonah Monheim	So
WR	80	John Jackson III	Sr
WR	81	Kyle Ford	Jr
WR	82	Austin Overn	Fr
TE	83	Josh Falo	Sr
TE	85	Ethan Rae	Jr
TE	87	Lake McRee	Fr
TE	89	Sean Mahoney	Jr

Defense

Pos.	#	Name	Class
RUSH	0	Korey Foreman	So
DB	1	Domani Jackson	Fr
RUSH	2	Romello Height	So
DB	4	Max Williams	Jr
DB	6	Mekhi Blackmon	Sr
DB	7	Calen Bullock	So
DB	8	Zion Branch	Fr
ILB	9	Raesjon Davis	So
ILB	10	Ralen Goforth	Sr
DB	13	Adonis Otey	Jr
DB	14	Jacobe Covington	So
DB	15	Anthony Beavers Jr.	Fr
DB	16	Prophet Brown	Fr
DB	17	Micah Croom	Sr
ILB	18	Eric Gentry	So
DB	19	Jaylin Smith	So
DB	21	Latrell McCutchin	So
DB	22	Ceyair Wright	Fr
DB	23	Joshua Jackson Jr.	So
LB	24	Julien Simon	Fr
DB	25	Briton Allen	Jr
DB	26	Fabian Ross	Fr
DB	27	Bryson Shaw	Jr
DB	28	Xamarion Gordon	Fr
DB	29	Xavion Alford	So
ILB	30	Chris Thompson Jr.	Jr
DL	31	Tyrone Taleni	Sr
ILB	34	Carson Tabaracci	Fr
ILB	35	Clyde Moore	Jr
DB	36	John Armistead	Sr
RUSH	37	Devan Thompkins	Fr
RUSH	39	Garrett Pomerantz	Fr
DB	40	L Simpson	So
ILB	41	Garrison Madden	Fr
ILB	44	Tuasivi Nomura	Jr
DL	47	Stanley Ta'ufo'ou	Jr
DB	48	Daniel Jimenez-Fulton	Fr
DL	49	Tuli Tuipulotu	Jr
DL	51	Solomon Byrd	Sr
ILB	52	Theo Bravos	So
ILB	53	Shane Lee	Sr
ILB	54	Tayler Katoa	Sr
ILB	57	Roman Marchetti	Fr
RUSH	58	Solomon Tuliaupupu	Sr
DL	77	Jamar Sekona	So
DL	79	De'jon Benton	Jr
DB	82	Vincent Ragsdale	Sr
DL	90	Colin Mobley	Fr
DL	91	Brandon Pili	Sr
DL	93	Sinjun Astani	Sr
DL	94	Kobe Pepe	So
DL	95	Luke Otte	Sr
DL	97	Earl Barquet Jr.	Jr
DL	99	Nick Figueroa	Sr

Special teams

Pos.	#	Name	Class
P	35	Michael McAllister	So
P	36	Will Rose	Jr
K	38	Alex Stadthaus	Sr
LS	39	Jac Casasante	Sr
P	42	Aadyn Sleep-Dalton	Jr
K	46	Denis Lynch	Fr
LS	48	Daniel Meunier	Jr
LS	53	Nathan Weneta	So
K/P	98	Garth White	So

Head coach

- Lincoln Riley

Coordinators/assistant coaches

- Dennis Simmons – Assistant head coach/passing game coordinator/outside wide receivers
- Josh Henson – Offensive coordinator/offensive line
- Alex Grinch – Defensive coordinator/safeties
- Donte Williams – Defensive backs/defensive pass game coordinator
- Zach Hanson – Tight ends
- Kiel McDonald – Running backs
- Brian Odom – Inside linebackers
- Roy Manning – Outside linebackers/nickels
- Shaun Nua – Defensive line
- Luke Huard – Inside wide receivers
- Bennie Wylie – Director, football sports performance
- Bryan Kegans – Associate director of football sports performance
- Caesar Martinez – Assistant director of football sports performance
- Andrew Smith – Assistant strength coach
- Caleb Withrow – Assistant strength coach
- Derek Faavi – Offensive analyst
- Will Harriger – Offensive analyst/assistant quarterbacks / game management coordinator
- Parker Henry – Defensive analyst/assistant linebackers
- Lenny Vandermade – Offensive analyst/assistant offensive line
- Austin Woods – Defensive analyst/assistant defensive line
- Ryan Dougherty – Assistant special teams coordinator
- Zach Crabtree – Offensive graduate assistant
- Will Johnson – Defensive graduate assistant
- Conner McQueen – Offensive graduate assistant
- Peyton Pelluer – Defensive graduate assistant
- Taylor Mays – Student assistant
- Jackson Polk – Assistant director of sports science
- Eric Espinoza – Director, video operations
- Alex Nederhoff – Football video & systems analyst

Legend

- (C) Team captain
- (S) Suspended
- (I) Ineligible
- Injured
- Redshirt

Roster
Last update: 8/11/22

=== Depth chart ===
Defense

FS
Max Williams
Xamarion Gordon
OR Bryson Shaw

Nickel	MIKE	WILL	SAM
Jaylin Smith	Eric Gentry	Shane Lee	Nick Figueroa
Latrell McCutchin	Tuasivi Nomura	OR Ralen Goforth	Solomon Byrd
–	Raesjon Davis	–	OR Korey Foreman

SS
Calen Bullock
Anthony Beavers Jr.
Xavion Alford Jr.

CB
Mekhi Blackmon
Prophet Brown
–

DE	NT	DE
De’jon Benton	Stanley Ta’ufo’ou	Tuli Tuipulotu
OR Tyrone Taleni	OR Brandon Pili	Solomon Tuliaupupu
Sinjun Astani OR Earl Barquet Jr.	Jamar Sekona	-

CB
Ceyair Wright
Jacobe Covington
–

Offense

WR
Mario Williams
Tahj Washington
OR Gary Bryant Jr.

WR
Brenden Rice
Kyron Hudson
OR Kyle Ford

LT	LG	C	RG	RT
Courtland Ford	Andrew Vorhees	Brett Neilon	Justin Dedich	Jonah Monheim
OR Bobby Haskins	Gino Quinones	Justin Dedich	Jonah Monheim	Mason Murphy
–	–	Andrew Milek	Joe Bryson	–

TE
Lake McRee
OR Malcolm Epps
Josh Falo

WR
Jordan Addison
Terrell Bynum
CJ Williams

QB
Caleb Williams
Miller Moss
Jake Jensen

Key reserves
Offense

QB Jake Jensen
RB Darwin Barlow
WR Michael Jackson III
WR John Jackson III
TE Ethan Rae
TE Sean Mahoney
OL Cooper Lovelace
OL Jason Rodriguez
OL Caadyn Stephen
OL Andres Dewerk

Defense

DL Kobe Pepe
DL Colin Mobley
RUSH Devan Thompkins
LB Carson Tabaracci
LB Chris Thompson Jr.
LB Garrison Madden
LB Julien Simon
LB Tayler Katoa
DB Domani Jackson
DB Fabian Ross
DB Adonis Otey
DB Briton Allen
DB Joshua Jackson Jr.
DB Micah Croom

Special teams

K/P Garth White
LS Nathan Weneta

Out (indefinitely)
TE Jude Wolfe
S Zion Branch
Out (season)
QB Mo Hasan
RUSH Romello Height
RB Travis Dye
Out (suspended)
Out (retired)

RB
Austin Jones
"OR" Darwin Barlow
Raleek Brown

Special teams
PK Denis Lynch
PK Alex Stadthaus
P Aadyn Sleep-Dalton
P Will Rose
KR Gary Bryant Jr.
PR Tahj Washington
LS Jac Casasante
H Will Rose

True Freshman official Depth Chart Week 1 vs Rice (09/01/22)

=== Injury report ===
Name	Position	Injury	Duration
Mo Hasan	QB	Torn Achilles	Season
Zion Branch	S	Torn ACL	Season
Jude Wolfe	TE	Foot	Mid-Season
Travis Dye	RB	Leg	Season

=== Scholarship distribution chart ===
Position/Year	Freshman (18)	Sophomore (21)	Junior (22)	Senior (20)	2023 commit (20)	2023 transfer portal (3)	2024 commit (3)	2025 commit (1)
QB 3 (1)	Miller Moss	Jake Jensen; Caleb Williams	–	–	Malachi Nelson	-	-	-
RB 4 (1)	Raleek Brown	–	Darwin Barlow	Travis Dye; Austin Jones	Quinten Joyner; A’Marion Peterson	-	-	-
WR 11 (4)	Kyron Hudson; CJ Williams	Michael Jackson III; Mario Williams	Jordan Addison; Gary Bryant Jr. Kyle Ford; Brenden Rice; Tahj Washington	Terrell Bynum; John Jackson III	Zachariah Branch; Ja’Kobi Lane; Makai Lemon	-	Jason Robinson Jr.	-
TE 5 (2)	Lake McRee	–	Ethan Rae; Jude Wolfe	Michael Epps; Josh Falo	Kade Eldridge	-	Joey Olsen	-
OL 13 (5)	Mason Murphy	Andres Dewerk; Courtland Ford; Andrew Milek; Jonah Monheim; Caadyn Stephen	Gino Quinones; Cooper Lovelace; Jason Rodriguez	Justin Dedich; Bobby Haskins; Brett Neilon; Andrew Vorhees	Micah Bañuelos; Alani Noa; Elijah Paige; Tobias Raymond; Amos Talalele	-	-	-
DL 11 (3)	Colin Mobley	Kobe Pepe; Jamar Sekona	Earl Barquet Jr. De’jon Benton; Stanley Ta’ufo’ou; Tuli Tuipulotu	Solomon Byrd; Nick Figueroa; Brandon Pili; Tyrone Taleni	Sam Greene; Elijah Hughes; Deijon Laffitte	Kyon Barrs	-	-
RUSH 4 (2)	Devan Thompkins	Korey Foreman; Romello Height	–	Solomon Tuliaupupu	David Peevy; Braylan Shelby	-	-	-
ILB 10 (1)	Garrison Madden; Julien Simon; Carson Tabaracci	Raesjon Davis; Eric Gentry	Tuasivi Nomura; Chris Thompson Jr.	Ralen Goforth; Tayler Katoa; Shane Lee	Tackett Curtis	Jamil Muhammad	-	-
DB 18 (2)	Anthony Beavers Jr. Zion Branch; Prophet Brown; Xamarion Gordon; Domani Jackson; Fabian Ross; Ceyair Wright	Xavion Alford; Calen Bullock; Jacobe Covington; Joshua Jackson Jr. Latrell McCutchin; Jaylin Smith	Briton Allen; Adonis Otey; Bryson Shaw; Max Williams	Mekhi Blackmon	Maliki Crawford; Christian Pierce	-	-	-
SP 2 (-)	–	–	Aadyn Sleep-Dalton	Alex Stadthaus*	–	Eddie Czaplicki	-	-
ATH (2)	x	x	x	x	-	-	Aaron Butler	Arron White

- Scholarship Distribution 2022

redshirt year used / redshirt year eligible / * Former Walk-on – 80 players on scholarship / 85 scholarships permitted

== Game summaries ==
=== vs Rice ===
Rice Owls (0–0) vs No. 14 USC Trojans (0–0) – Game summary

Quarter	1	2	3	4	Total
Owls	7	7	0	0	14
No. 14 Trojans	7	24	28	7	66

at Los Angeles Memorial Coliseum • Los Angeles, CA

- Date: September 3, 2022
- Game time: 3:00 p.m.
- Game weather: Sunny, 94 °F (34 °C)
- Game attendance: 60,113
- Referee: Jim Wharrie
- TV announcers (Pac-12 Network): Ted Robinson (play-by-play), Yogi Roth (analyst)

Game information

First quarter

- (11:22) USC – Jordan Addison 5-yard pass from Caleb Williams, Denis Lynch kick (Drive: 7 plays, 75 yards, 3:42; USC 7–0)
- (3:11) RICE – Ari Broussard 1-yard run, Christian VanSickle kick (Drive: 16 plays, 74 yards, 8:09; Tied 7–7)

Second quarter

- (14:15) USC – Austin Jones 4-yard run, Denis Lynch kick (Drive: 9 plays, 84 yards, 3:56; USC 14–7)
- (10:54) USC – Raleek Brown 14-yard run, Denis Lynch kick (Drive: 4 plays, 70 yards, 1:47; USC 21–7)
- (8:05) USC – Calen Bullock 93-yard interception return, Denis Lynch kick (Drive: 5 plays, 63 yards, 2:44; USC 28–7)
- (1:37) RICE – Ari Broussard 2-yard run, Christian VanSickle kick (Drive: 10 plays, 75 yards, 6:30; USC 28–14)
- (0:00) USC – Denis Lynch 25-yard field goal (Drive: 11 plays, 67 yards, 1:35; USC 31–14)

Third quarter

- (13:48) USC – Shane Lee 40-yard interception return, Denis Lynch kick (Drive: 3 plays, 6 yards, 1:21; USC 38–14)
- (13:00) USC – Ralen Goforth 31-yard interception return, Denis Lynch kick (Drive: 3 plays, 1 yards, 0:47; USC 45–14)
- (9:16) USC – Jordan Addison 3-yard pass from Caleb Williams, Denis Lynch kick (Drive: 4 plays, 34 yards, 2:07; USC 52–14)
- (1:38) USC – Austin Jones 28-yard run, Denis Lynch kick (Drive: 8 plays, 85 yards, 4:59; USC 59–14)

Fourth quarter

- (6:13) USC – Darwin Barlow 2-yard run, Denis Lynch kick (Drive: 5 plays, 71 yards, 3:04; USC 66–14)

Statistics	RICE	USC
First downs	14	27
Total yards	280	538
Rushes/yards	34–146	28–208
Passing yards	134	330
Passing: Comp–Att–Int	14–28–4	25–30–0
Time of possession	32:52	27:08

Team	Category	Player	Statistics
Rice	Passing	Wiley Green	8/13, 169 yards, INT
Rice	Rushing	Cameron Montgomery	6 carries, 99 yards
Rice	Receiving	Luke McCaffrey	5 receptions, 51 yards
USC	Passing	Caleb Williams	19/22, 249 yards, 2 TD
USC	Rushing	Caleb Williams	6 carries, 68 yards
USC	Receiving	Tahj Washington	4 receptions, 65 yards

=== at Stanford ===
No. 10 USC Trojans (1–0) at Stanford Cardinal (1–0) – Game summary

Quarter	1	2	3	4	Total
No. 10 Trojans	21	14	6	0	41
Cardinal	7	7	0	14	28

at Stanford Stadium • Stanford, CA

- Date: September 10, 2022
- Game time: 4:30 p.m.
- Game weather: Sunny, 79 °F (26 °C)
- Game attendance: 43,813
- Referee: Michael Mothershed
- TV announcers (ABC): Rece Davis (play-by-play), Kirk Herbstreit (analyst), Holly Rowe (sideline)

Game information

First quarter

- (12:38) USC – Lake McRee 5-yard pass from Caleb Williams, Denis Lynch kick (Drive: 4 plays, 33 yards, 1:22; USC 7–0)
- (4:03) USC – Jordan Addison 22-yard pass from Caleb Williams, Denis Lynch kick (Drive: 8 plays, 83 yards, 3:23; USC 14–0)
- (0:57) STAN – E. J. Smith 3-yard pass from Tanner McKee, Joshua Karty kick (Drive: 7 plays, 93 yards, 3:06; USC 14–7)
- (0:46) USC – Jordan Addison 75-yard pass from Caleb Williams, Denis Lynch kick (Drive: 1 play, 75 yards, 0:11; USC 21–7)

Second quarter

- (9:02) USC – Mario Williams 15-yard pass from Caleb Williams, Denis Lynch kick (Drive: 7 plays, 98 yards, 3:13; USC 28–7)
- (6:13) STAN – E. J. Smith 5-yard run, Joshua Karty kick (Drive: 8 plays, 67 yards, 2:49; USC 28–14)
- (2:33) USC – Travis Dye 27-yard run, Denis Lynch kick (Drive: 7 plays, 75 yards, 3:40; USC 35–14)

Third quarter

- (13:49) USC – Denis Lynch 45-yard field goal (Drive: 5 plays, 47 yards, 1:11; USC 38–14)
- (0:55) USC – Denis Lynch 42-yard field goal (Drive: 4 plays, 4 yards, 2:14; USC 41–14)

Fourth quarter

- (10:21) STAN – Casey Filkins 2-yard run, Joshua Karty kick (Drive: 13 plays, 75 yards, 5:34; USC 41–21)
- (5:03) STAN – Tanner McKee 2-yard run, Joshua Karty kick (Drive: 7 plays, 70 yards, 2:51; USC 41–28)

Statistics	USC	STAN
First downs	24	33
Total yards	505	441
Rushes/yards	36–164	45–221
Passing yards	341	220
Passing: Comp–Att–Int	20–27–0	20–35–2
Time of possession	30:33	29:27

Team	Category	Player	Statistics
USC	Passing	Caleb Williams	20/27, 341 yards, 4 TD
USC	Rushing	Travis Dye	14 carries, 105 yards, TD
USC	Receiving	Jordan Addison	7 receptions, 172 yards, 2 TD
Stanford	Passing	Tanner McKee	20/35, 220 yards, TD, 2 INT
Stanford	Rushing	E. J. Smith	19 carries, 88 yards, TD
Stanford	Receiving	Elijah Higgins	3 receptions, 50 yards

=== vs Fresno State ===
Fresno State Bulldogs (1–1) vs No. 7 USC Trojans (2–0) – Game summary

Quarter	1	2	3	4	Total
Bulldogs	0	10	7	0	17
No. 7 Trojans	14	7	14	10	45

at Los Angeles Memorial Coliseum • Los Angeles, CA

- Date: September 17, 2022
- Game time: 7:30 p.m.
- Game weather: Clear, 69 °F (21 °C)
- Game attendance: 67,226
- Referee: Steven Strimling
- TV announcers (Fox): Noah Eagle (play-by-play), Mark Helfrich (analyst)

Game information

First quarter

- (10:05) USC – Jordan Addison 2-yard pass from Caleb Williams, Denis Lynch kick (Drive: 12 plays, 83 yards, 4:55; USC 7–0)
- (3:35) USC – Caleb Williams 8-yard run, Denis Lynch kick (Drive: 12 plays, 65 yards, 5:21; USC 14–0)

Second quarter

- (14:52) FRES – Abraham Montano 23-yard field goal (Drive: 10 plays, 70 yards, 3:40; USC 14–3)
- (8:04) USC – Caleb Williams 1-yard run, Denis Lynch kick (Drive: 15 plays, 83 yards, 6:42; USC 21–3)
- (6:30) FRES – Erik Brooks 39-yard pass from Jake Haener, Abraham Montano kick (Drive: 5 plays, 75 yards, 1:24; USC 21–10)

Third quarter

- (11:44) USC – Austin Jones 3-yard run, Denis Lynch kick (Drive: 5 plays, 46 yards, 1:47; USC 28–10)
- (9:04) FRES – Malik Sherrod 32-yard run, Abraham Montano kick (Drive: 5 plays, 71 yards, 1:57; USC 28–17)
- (7:13) USC – Travis Dye 25-yard run, Denis Lynch kick (Drive: 4 plays, 75 yards, 1:42; USC 35–17)

Fourth quarter

- (14:44) USC – Malcolm Epps 10-yard pass from Caleb Williams, Denis Lynch kick (Drive: 10 plays, 70 yards, 3:41; USC 42–17)
- (4:09) USC – Denis Lynch 41-yard field goal (Drive: 9 plays, 61 yards, 5:17; USC 45–17)

Statistics	FRES	USC
First downs	23	29
Total yards	421	517
Rushes/yards	32–164	28–233
Passing yards	257	284
Passing: Comp–Att–Int	21–30–1	25–37–0
Time of possession	25:52	34:08

Team	Category	Player	Statistics
Fresno State	Passing	Logan Fife	1/12, 140 yards
Fresno State	Rushing	Jordan Mims	15 carries, 114 yards
Fresno State	Receiving	Erik Brooks	6 receptions, 89 yards, TD
USC	Passing	Caleb Williams	25/37, 284 yards, 2 TD
USC	Rushing	Austin Jones	12 carries, 110 yards, TD
USC	Receiving	Mario Williams	6 receptions, 77 yards

=== at Oregon State ===
No. 7 USC Trojans (3–0) at Oregon State Beavers (3–0) – Game summary

Quarter	1	2	3	4	Total
No. 7 Trojans	0	3	0	14	17
Beavers	0	7	0	7	14

at Reser Stadium • Corvallis, OR

- Date: September 24, 2022
- Game time: 6:30 p.m.
- Game weather: Sunny, 76 °F (24 °C)
- Game attendance: 28,768
- Referee: Mike Richards
- TV announcers (Pac-12 Network): Ted Robinson (play-by-play), Yogi Roth (analyst)

Game information

First quarter

None

Second quarter

- (13:18) OSU – Deshaun Fenwick 4-yard run, Everett Hayes kick (Drive: 10 plays, 80 yards, 4:58; Oregon State 7–0)
- (5:38) USC – Denis Lynch 42-yard field goal (Drive: 7 plays, 41 yards, 1:59; Oregon State 7–3)

Third quarter

None

Fourth quarter

- (14:18) USC – Travis Dye 7-yard run, Denis Lynch kick (Drive: 7 plays, 26 yards, 3:07; USC 10–7)
- (4:41) OSU – Jam Griffin 18-yard, Everett Hayes kick (Drive: 2 plays, 22 yards, 0:44; Oregon State 14–10)
- (1:13) USC – Jordan Addison 21-yard pass from Caleb Williams, Denis Lynch kick (Drive: 11 plays, 84 yards, 3:22; USC 17–14)

Statistics	USC	OSU
First downs	21	18
Total yards	357	320
Rushes/yards	37–177	31–153
Passing yards	180	167
Passing: Comp–Att–Int	16–36–0	17–29–4
Time of possession	30:15	29:45

Team	Category	Player	Statistics
USC	Passing	Caleb Williams	16/36, 180 yards, TD
USC	Rushing	Travis Dye	19 carries, 133 yards, TD
USC	Receiving	Tahj Washington	6 receptions, 67 yards
Oregon State	Passing	Chance Nolan	17/29, 167 yards, 4 INT
Oregon State	Rushing	Jam Griffin	12 carries, 84 yards, TD
Oregon State	Receiving	Tyjon Lindsey	5 receptions, 44 yards

=== vs Arizona State ===
Arizona State Sun Devils (1–3) vs No. 6 USC Trojans (4–0) – Game summary

Quarter	1	2	3	4	Total
Sun Devils	7	10	0	8	25
No. 6 Trojans	14	7	7	14	42

at Los Angeles Memorial Coliseum • Los Angeles, CA

- Date: October 1, 2022
- Game time: 7:30 p.m.
- Game weather: Clear, 66 °F (19 °C)
- Game attendance: 62,133
- Referee: Chris Coyte
- TV announcers (ESPN): Dave Flemming (play-by-play), Rod Gilmore (analyst), Tiffany Blackmon (sideline)

Game information

First quarter

- (10:28) USC – Caleb Williams 1-yard run, Denis Lynch kick (Drive: 9 plays, 75 yards, 4:32; USC 7–0)
- (6:28) ASU – Xazavian Valladay 29-yard pass from Emory Jones, Carter Brown kick (Drive: 8 plays, 74 yards, 4:00; Tied 7–7)
- (1:52) USC – Mario Williams 7-yard pass from Caleb Williams, Denis Lynch kick (Drive: 10 plays, 75 yards, 4:36; USC 14–7)

Second quarter

- (9:53) ASU – Carter Brown 40-yard field goal (Drive: 12 plays, 53 yards, 6:59; USC 14–10)
- (6:05) USC – Malcolm Epps 4-yard pass from Caleb Williams, Denis Lynch kick (Drive: 10 plays, 94 yards, 3:48; USC 21–10)
- (2:27) ASU – Emory Jones 6-yard run, Denis Lynch kick (Drive: 7 plays, 75 yards, 3:38; USC 21–17)

Third quarter

- (1:10) USC – Travis Dye 2-yard run, Denis Lynch kick (Drive: 9 plays, 50 yards, 5:28; USC 28–17)

Fourth quarter

- (10:54) USC – Kyron Hudson 2-yard pass from Caleb Williams, Denis Lynch kick (Drive: 8 plays, 60 yards, 3:20; USC 35–17)
- (6:16) ASU – Xazavian Valladay 2-yard run, Emory Jones two-point pass to Xazavian Valladay (Drive: 10 plays, 75 yards, 4:38; USC 35–25)
- (3:46) USC – Travis Dye 1-yard run, Denis Lynch kick (Drive: 5 plays, 39 yards, 2:30; USC 42–25)

Statistics	ASU	USC
First downs	20	29
Total yards	331	485
Rushes/yards	29–88	30–137
Passing yards	243	348
Passing: Comp–Att–Int	23–32–1	27–37–1
Time of possession	29:55	30:05

Team	Category	Player	Statistics
Arizona State	Passing	Emory Jones	23/32, 243 yards, TD, INT
Arizona State	Rushing	Xazavian Valladay	13 carries, 64 yards, TD
Arizona State	Receiving	Bryan Thompson	5 receptions, 86 yards
USC	Passing	Caleb Williams	27/37, 348 yards, 3 TD, INT
USC	Rushing	Travis Dye	13 carries, 62 yards, 2 TD
USC	Receiving	Jordan Addison	8 receptions, 105 yards

=== vs Washington State ===
Washington State Cougars (4–1) vs No. 6 USC Trojans (5–0) – Game summary

Quarter	1	2	3	4	Total
Cougars	0	14	0	0	14
No. 6 Trojans	10	7	7	6	30

at Los Angeles Memorial Coliseum • Los Angeles, CA

- Date: October 8, 2022
- Game time: 4:30 p.m.
- Game weather: Clear, 80 °F (27 °C)
- Game attendance: 63,204
- Referee: Francisco Villar
- TV announcers (Fox): Noah Eagle (play-by-play), Mark Helfrich (analyst)

Game information

First quarter

- (8:31) USC – Mario Williams 38-yard pass from Caleb Williams, Denis Lynch kick (Drive: 8 plays, 82 yards, 3:32; USC 7–0)
- (3:32) USC – Denis Lynch 31-yard field goal (Drive: 7 plays, 46 yards, 2:50; USC 10–0)

Second quarter

- (14:56) WSU – Robert Ferrel 12-yard pass from Cameron Ward, Dean Janikowski kick (Drive: 8 plays, 92 yards, 3:36; USC 10–7)
- (11:48) WSU – Nakia Watson 1-yard pass from Cameron Ward, Dean Janikowski kick (Drive: 5 plays, 75 yards, 1:49; Washington State 14–10)
- (2:10) USC – Travis Dye 4-yard run, Denis Lynch kick (Drive: 11 plays, 75 yards, 6:19; USC 17–14)

Third quarter

- (5:17) USC – Mario Williams 24-yard pass from Caleb Williams, Denis Lynch kick (Drive: 5 plays, 62 yards, 2:24; USC 24–14)

Fourth quarter

- (9:09) USC – Denis Lynch 27-yard field goal (Drive: 13 plays, 70 yards, 7:27; USC 27–14)
- (2:08) USC – Denis Lynch 31-yard field goal (Drive: 11 plays, 51 yards, 5:21; USC 30–14)

Statistics	WSU	USC
First downs	17	23
Total yards	316	369
Rushes/yards	29–144	40–181
Passing yards	172	188
Passing: Comp–Att–Int	19–32–0	15–29–0
Time of possession	27:12	32:48

Team	Category	Player	Statistics
Washington State	Passing	Cam Ward	19/32, 172 yards, 2 TD
Washington State	Rushing	Jaylen Jenkins	13 carries, 130 yards
Washington State	Receiving	Jaylen Jenkins	2 receptions, 54 yards
USC	Passing	Caleb Williams	15/29, 188 yards, 2 TD
USC	Rushing	Travis Dye	28 carries, 149 yards, TD
USC	Receiving	Mario Williams	4 receptions, 82 yards, 2 TD

=== at No. 20 Utah ===
No. 7 USC Trojans (6–0) at No. 20 Utah Utes (4–2) – Game summary

Quarter	1	2	3	4	Total
No. 7 Trojans	14	14	7	7	42
No. 20 Utes	7	14	7	15	43

at Rice-Eccles Stadium • Salt Lake City, UT

- Date: October 15, 2022
- Game time: 5:00 p.m.
- Game weather: Sunny, 68 °F (20 °C)
- Game attendance: 53,609
- Referee: Mark Duddy
- TV announcers (Fox): Jason Benetti (play-by-play), Brock Huard (analyst), Allison Williams (sideline)

Game information

First quarter

- (13:16) USC – Travis Dye 8-yard run, Denis Lynch kick (Drive: 5 plays, 75 yards, 1:44; USC 7–0)
- (4:53) USC – Jordan Addison 2-yard pass from Caleb Williams, Denis Lynch kick (Drive: 9 plays, 80 yards, 4:04; USC 14–0)
- (1:08) UTAH – Micah Bernard 12-yard run, Jadon Redding kick (Drive: 9 plays, 75 yards, 3:45; USC 14–7)

Second quarter

- (14:20) USC – Kyron Hudson 2-yard pass from Caleb Williams, Denis Lynch kick (Drive: 4 plays, 69 yards, 1:48; USC 21–7)
- (4:01) UTAH – Cameron Rising 2-yard run, Jadon Redding kick (Drive: 4 plays, 60 yards, 1:37; USC 21–14)
- (1:15) USC – Josh Falo 3-yard pass from Caleb Williams, Denis Lynch kick (Drive: 9 plays, 79 yards, 2:46; USC 28–14)
- (0:30) UTAH – Devaughn Vele 16-yard pass from Cameron Rising, Jadon Redding kick (Drive: 5 plays, 70 yards, 0:45; USC 28–21)

Third quarter

- (12:02) UTAH – Dalton Kincaid 4-yard pass from Cameron Rising, Jadon Redding kick (Drive: 7 plays, 75 yards, 2:58; Tied 28–28)
- (11:02) USC – Josh Falo 11-yard pass from Caleb Williams, Denis Lynch kick (Drive: 3 plays, 50 yards, 1:00; USC 35–28)

Fourth quarter

- (10:55) UTAH – Cameron Rising 1-yard run, Jadon Redding kick (Drive: 10 plays, 79 yards, 4:10; Tied 35–35)
- (6:15) USC – Michael Jackson III 20-yard pass from Caleb Williams, Denis Lynch kick (Drive: 11 plays, 90 yards, 4:40; USC 42–35)
- (0:48) UTAH – Cameron Rising 1-yard run, Cameron Rising two-point run (Drive: 15 plays, 75 yards, 5:27; Utah 43–42)

Statistics	USC	UTAH
First downs	28	31
Total yards	556	562
Rushes/yards	27–175	32–138
Passing yards	381	424
Passing: Comp–Att–Int	25–42–0	31–45–0
Time of possession	28:10	31:50

Team	Category	Player	Statistics
USC	Passing	Caleb Williams	25/42, 381 yards, 5 TD
USC	Rushing	Travis Dye	11 carries, 76 yards, TD
USC	Receiving	Mario Williams	4 receptions, 145 yards
Utah	Passing	Cameron Rising	30/44, 415 yards, 2 TD
Utah	Rushing	Cameron Rising	11 carries, 60 yards, 3 TD
Utah	Receiving	Dalton Kincaid	16 receptions, 234 yards, TD

=== at Arizona ===
No. 10 USC Trojans (6–1) at Arizona Wildcats (3–4) – Game summary

Quarter	1	2	3	4	Total
No. 10 Trojans	10	7	14	14	45
Wildcats	10	3	16	8	37

at Arizona Stadium • Tucson, AZ

- Date: October 29, 2022
- Game time: 4:00 p.m.
- Game weather: Sunny, 79 °F (26 °C)
- Game attendance: 44,006
- Referee: Michael Mothershed
- TV announcers (Pac-12 Network): Ted Robinson (play-by-play), Yogi Roth (sideline)

Game information

First quarter

- (10:56) USC – Denis Lynch 45-yard field goal (Drive: 10 plays, 47 yards, 4:04; USC 3–0)
- (7:01) ARIZ – Dorian Singer 23-yard pass from Jayden de Laura, Tyler Loop kick (Drive: 8 plays, 75 yards, 3:55; Arizona 7–3)
- (2:57) USC – Raleek Brown 6-yard pass from Caleb Williams, Denis Lynch kick (Drive: 10 plays, 75 yards, 4:04; USC 10–7)
- (0:49) ARIZ – Tyler Loop 42-yard field goal (Drive: 7 plays, 50 yards, 2:08; Tied 10–10)

Second quarter

- (12:33) USC – Brenden Rice 2-yard pass from Caleb Williams, Denis Lynch kick (Drive: 8 plays, 75 yards, 3:16; USC 17–10)
- (6:59) ARIZ – Tyler Loop 25-yard field goal (Drive: 13 plays, 67 yards, 5:34; USC 17–13)

Third quarter

- (12:07) ARIZ – Tyler Loop 29-yard goal (Drive: 7 plays, 74 yards, 2:53; USC 17–16)
- (10:58) USC – Tahj Washington 5-yard pass from Caleb Williams, Denis Lynch kick (Drive: 4 plays, 75 yards, 1:09; USC 24–16)
- (5:08) USC – Tahj Washington 47-yard pass from Caleb Williams, Denis Lynch kick (Drive: 1 plays, 47 yards, 0:12; USC 31–16)
- (3:58) ARIZ – Dorian Singer 19-yard pass from Jayden de Laura, Tyler Loop kick (Drive: 4 plays, 60 yards, 1:10; USC 31–23)
- (1:42) ARIZ – Michael Wiley 10-yard run (Drive: 3 plays, 57 yards, 1:06; USC 31–29)

Fourth quarter

- (13:38) USC – Kyle Ford 5-yard pass from Caleb Williams, Denis Lynch kick (Drive: 9 plays, 75 yards, 3:04; USC 38–29)
- (6:24) USC – Travis Dye 2-yard run, Denis Lynch kick (Drive: 11 plays, 83 yards, 5:23; USC 45–29)
- (1:26) ARIZ – Dorian Singer 5-yard pass from Jayden de Laura, Jayden de Laura two-point pass to Jacob Cowing (Drive: 12 plays, 75 yards, 4:58; USC 45–37)

Statistics	USC	ARIZ
First downs	26	28
Total yards	621	543
Rushes/yards	32–210	26–163
Passing yards	411	380
Passing: Comp–Att–Int	31–45–0	26–43–1
Time of possession	30:51	29:09

Team	Category	Player	Statistics
USC	Passing	Caleb Williams	31/45, 411 yards, 5 TD
USC	Rushing	Travis Dye	20 carries, 113 yards, TD
USC	Receiving	Tahj Washington	7 receptions, 118 yards, 2 TD
Arizona	Passing	Jayden de Laura	26/43, 380 yards, 3 TD, INT
Arizona	Rushing	Jayden de Laura	8 carries, 54 yards
Arizona	Receiving	Dorian Singer	7 receptions, 141 yards, 3 TD

=== vs California ===
California Golden Bears (3–5) vs No. 9 USC Trojans (7–1) – Game summary

Quarter	1	2	3	4	Total
Golden Bears	7	0	7	21	35
No. 9 Trojans	6	14	14	7	41

at Los Angeles Memorial Coliseum • Los Angeles, CA

- Date: November 5, 2022
- Game time: 7:30 p.m.
- Game weather: Clear, 57 °F (14 °C)
- Game attendance: 64,916
- Referee: Chris Coyte
- TV announcers (ESPN): Dave Pasch (play-by-play), Dusty Dvoracek (analyst), Tom Luginbill (sideline)

Game information

First quarter

- (10:29) CAL – Jaydn Ott 10-yard run, Dario Longhetto kick (Drive: 5 plays, 76 yards, 1:46; California 7–0)
- (5:58) USC – Caleb Williams 1-yard run (Drive: 10 plays, 72 yards, 4:23; California 7–6)

Second quarter

- (11:44) USC – Travis Dye 12-yard run, Denis Lynch kick (Drive: 7 plays, 58 yards, 2:26; USC 13–7)
- (0:53) USC – Michael Jackson III 7-yard pass from Caleb Williams, Denis Lynch kick (Drive: 3 plays, 50 yards, 0:59; USC 20–7)

Third quarter

- (11:00) USC – Michael Jackson III 59-yard pass from Caleb Williams, Denis Lynch kick (Drive: 5 plays, 70 yards, 2:21; USC 27–7)
- (7:27) CAL – Monroe Young 2-yard pass from Jack Plummer, Dario Longhetto kick (Drive: 6 plays, 73 yards, 3:26; USC 27–14)
- (1:18) USC – Tahj Washington 8-yard pass from Caleb Williams, Denis Lynch kick (Drive: 8 plays, 86 yards, 4:03; USC 34–14)

Fourth quarter

- (12:56) CAL – Mavin Anderson 47-yard pass from Jack Plummer, Dario Longhetto kick (Drive: 8 plays, 92 yards, 3:17; USC 34–21)
- (9:00) CAL – Jeremiah Hunter 3-yard pass from Jack Plummer (Drive: 10 plays, 52 yards, 3:52; USC 34–28)
- (5:34) USC – Lake McCree 2-yard pass from Caleb Williams, Denis Lynch kick (Drive: 6 plays, 77 yards, 3:20; USC 41–28)
- (2:31) CAL – Jaydn Ott 4-yard run, Jack Plummer two-point pass to Monroe Young (Drive: 12 plays, 85 yards, 2:54; USC 41–35)

Statistics	CAL	USC
First downs	22	24
Total yards	469	515
Rushes/yards	24–63	28–155
Passing yards	406	360
Passing: Comp–Att–Int	35–49–1	26–41–0
Time of possession	32:00	28:00

Team	Category	Player	Statistics
California	Passing	Jack Plummer	35/49, 406 yards, 3 TD, INT
California	Rushing	Jaydn Ott	14 carries, 50 yards, TD
California	Receiving	Jeremiah Hunter	6 receptions, 102 yards, TD
USC	Passing	Caleb Williams	26/41, 360 yards, 4 TD
USC	Rushing	Travis Dye	15 carries, 98 yards, TD
USC	Receiving	Michael Jackson III	5 receptions, 115 yards, 2 TD

=== vs Colorado ===
Colorado Buffaloes (1–8) vs No. 8 USC Trojans (8–1) – Game summary

Quarter	1	2	3	4	Total
Buffaloes	3	0	7	7	17
No. 8 Trojans	2	24	15	14	55

at Los Angeles Memorial Coliseum • Los Angeles, CA

- Date: November 11, 2022
- Game time: 6:30 p.m.
- Game weather: Clear, 71 °F (22 °C)
- Game attendance: 61,206
- Referee: Mike McCabe
- TV announcers (FS1): Alex Faust (play-by-play), Petros Papadakis (analyst)

Game information

First quarter

- (7:18) USC – Team safety (Drive: 1 plays, −12 yards, 0:06; USC 2–0)
- (1:24) COL – Cole Becker 28-yard field goal (Drive: 9 plays, 58 yards, 3:58; Colorado 3–2)

Second quarter

- (10:09) USC – Caleb Williams 2-yard run, Denis Lynch kick (Drive: 12 plays, 72 yards, 6:07; USC 9–3)
- (7:55) USC – Caleb Williams 4-yard run, Denis Lynch kick (Drive: 2 plays, 8 yards, 0:49; USC 16–3)
- (1:58) USC – Brenden Rice 32-yard pass from Caleb Williams, Denis Lynch kick (Drive: 8 plays, 67 yards, 3:37; USC 23–3)
- (0:00) USC – Denis Lynch 34-yard field goal (Drive: 6 plays, 45 yards, 0:45; USC 26–3)

Third quarter

- (5:49) COL – Alex Fontenot 3-yard run, Cole Becker kick (Drive: 9 plays, 53 yards, 4:37; USC 26–10)
- (4:50) USC – Tahj Washington 61-yard pass from Caleb Williams, Will Rose two-point run (Drive: 2 plays, 60 yards, 0:50; USC 34–10)
- (0:27) USC – Austin Jones 12-yard pass from Caleb Williams, Denis Lynch kick (Drive: 8 plays, 71 yards, 4:09; USC 41–10)

Fourth quarter

- (11:34) USC – Raleek Brown 25-yard pass from Miller Moss, Denis Lynch kick (Drive: 5 plays, 63 yards, 2:32; USC 48–10)
- (7:22) COL – J. T. Shrout 8-yard run, Cole Becker kick (Drive: 9 plays, 71 yards, 4:12; USC 48–17)
- (0:36) USC – Darwin Barlow 3-yard run, Denis Lynch kick (Drive: 12 plays, 75 yards, 6:46; USC 55–17)

Statistics	COL	USC
First downs	14	27
Total yards	259	351
Rushes/yards	35–135	41–185
Passing yards	124	346
Passing: Comp–Att–Int	11–21–1	20–33–1
Time of possession	25:30	34:30

Team	Category	Player	Statistics
Colorado	Passing	J. T. Shrout	11/21, 124 yards, INT
Colorado	Rushing	Alex Fontenot	20 carries, 108 yards, TD
Colorado	Receiving	Jack Hestera	3 receptions, 39 yards
USC	Passing	Caleb Williams	14/26, 268 yards, 3 TD, INT
USC	Rushing	Austin Jones	11 carries, 74 yards
USC	Receiving	Kyle Ford	3 receptions, 73 yards

=== at No. 16 UCLA ===
No. 7 USC Trojans (9–1) at No. 16 UCLA Bruins (8–2) – Game summary

Quarter	1	2	3	4	Total
No. 7 Trojans	0	20	14	14	48
No. 16 Bruins	14	7	10	14	45

at Rose Bowl • Pasadena, CA

- Date: November 19, 2022
- Game time: 5:00 p.m.
- Game weather: Clear, 66 °F (19 °C)
- Game attendance: 70,865
- Referee: Steven Strimling
- TV announcers (Fox): Gus Johnson (play-by-play), Joel Klatt (analyst), Allison Williams (sideline)

Game information

First quarter

- (3:07) UCLA – Dorian Thompson-Robinson 1-yard run, Nicholas Barr-Mira kick (Drive: 14 plays, 80 yards, 4:59; UCLA 7–0)
- (2:05) UCLA – Michael Ezeike 30-yard pass from Dorian Thompson-Robinson, Nicholas Barr-Mira kick (Drive: 1 play, 30 yards, 0:18; UCLA 14–0)

Second quarter

- (12:46) USC – Caleb Williams 6-yard run, Denis Lynch kick (Drive: 10 plays, 75 yards, 4:55; UCLA 14–7)
- (6:27) USC – Denis Lynch 44-yard field goal (Drive: 7 plays, 72 yards, 2:41; UCLA 14–10)
- (4:26) UCLA – Dorian Thompson-Robinson 1-yard run, Nicholas Barr-Mira kick (Drive: 6 plays, 63 yards, 1:57; UCLA 21–10)
- (2:28) USC – Austin Jones 8-yard run, Denis Lynch kick (Drive: 5 plays, 79 yards, 2:06; UCLA 21–17)
- (0:01) USC – Denis Lynch 49-yard field goal (Drive: 3 plays, 15 yards, 0:20; UCLA 21–20)

Third quarter

- (10:55) UCLA – Nicholas Barr-Mira 46-yard field goal (Drive: 11 plays, 47 yards, 4:05; UCLA 24–20)
- (9:16) USC – Jordan Addison 35-yard pass from Caleb Williams, Denis Lynch kick (Drive: 4 plays, 65 yards, 1:42; USC 27–24)
- (7:24) USC – Austin Jones 2-yard run, Denis Lynch kick (Drive: 2 plays, 9 yards, 0:48; USC 34–24)
- (4:32) UCLA – Michael Ezeike 6-yard pass from Dorian Thompson-Robinson, Nicholas Barr-Mira kick (Drive: 8 plays, 85 yards, 2:50; USC 34–31)

Fourth quarter

- (15:00) USC – Kyle Ford 16-yard pass from Caleb Williams, Denis Lynch kick (Drive: 8 plays, 75 yards, 3:55; USC 41–31)
- (14:51) UCLA – Kazmeir Allen 55-yard pass from Dorian Thompson-Robinson, Nicholas Barr-Mira kick (Drive: 1 play, 55 yards, 0:16; USC 41–38)
- (10:01) USC – Darwin Barlow 6-yard run, Denis Lynch kick (Drive: 10 plays, 75 yards, 5:25; USC 48–38)
- (7:15) UCLA – Michael Ezeike 3-yard pass from Dorian Thompson-Robinson, Nicholas Barr-Mira kick (Drive: 8 plays, 75 yards, 2:32; USC 48–45)

Statistics	USC	UCLA
First downs	30	27
Total yards	649	513
Rushes/yards	38–179	37–204
Passing yards	470	309
Passing: Comp–Att–Int	32–43–1	23–38–3
Time of possession	35:20	24:40

Team	Category	Player	Statistics
USC	Passing	Caleb Williams	32/43, 470 yards, 2 TD, INT
USC	Rushing	Austin Jones	21 carries, 120 yards, 2 TD
USC	Receiving	Jordan Addison	11 receptions, 178 yards, TD
UCLA	Passing	Dorian Thompson-Robinson	28/39, 309 yards, 4 TD, 3 INT
UCLA	Rushing	Zach Charbonnet	19 carries, 95 yards
UCLA	Receiving	Jake Bobo	4 receptions, 76 yards

=== vs No. 15 Notre Dame ===
No. 15 Notre Dame Fighting Irish (8–3) vs No. 6 USC Trojans (10–1) – Game summary

Quarter	1	2	3	4	Total
No. 15 Fighting Irish	0	7	7	13	27
No. 6 Trojans	10	7	7	14	38

at Los Angeles Memorial Coliseum • Los Angeles, CA

- Date: November 26, 2022
- Game time: 4:30 p.m.
- Game weather: Clear, 64 °F (18 °C)
- Game attendance: 72,613
- Referee: Jerry Magallanes
- TV announcers (ABC): Chris Fowler (play-by-play), Kirk Herbstreit (analyst), Holly Rowe (sideline)

Game information

First quarter

- (11:24) USC – Tahj Washington 11-yard pass from Caleb Williams, Denis Lynch kick (Drive: 8 plays, 75 yards, 4:24; USC 7–0)
- (4:08) USC – Denis Lynch 31-yard field goal (Drive: 9 plays, 37 yards, 4:18; USC 10–0)

Second quarter

- (6:55) ND – Michael Mayer 22-yard pass from Drew Pyne, Blake Grupe kick (Drive: 8 plays, 75 yards, 4:24; USC 10–7)
- (0:52) USC – Caleb Williams 5-yard run, Denis Lynch kick (Drive: 10 plays, 75 yards, 5:40; USC 17–7)

Third quarter

- (8:31) USC – Raleek Brown 5-yard run, Denis Lynch kick (Drive: 7 plays, 74 yards, 2:58; USC 24–7)
- (6:37) ND – Deion Colzie 23-yard pass from Drew Pyne, Blake Grupe kick (Drive: 5 plays, 75 yards, 2:27; USC 24–14)

Fourth quarter

- (15:00) USC – Caleb Williams 3-yard run, Denis Lynch kick (Drive: 10 plays, 75 yards, 6:01; USC 31–14)
- (12:17) ND – Logan Diggs 5-yard run, Blake Grupe kick (Drive: 7 plays, 75 yards, 2:36; USC 31–21)
- (3:26) USC – Caleb Williams 16-yard run, Denis Lynch kick (Drive: 4 plays, 24 yards, 2:32; USC 38–21)
- (1:24) ND – Michael Mayer 24-yard pass from Drew Pyne (Drive: 6 plays, 56 yards, 1:25; USC 38–27)

Statistics	ND	USC
First downs	22	23
Total yards	52–408	61–436
Rushes/yards	90	204
Passing yards	318	232
Passing: Comp–Att–Int	23–26–1	18–22–0
Time of possession	24:37	35:23

Team	Category	Player	Statistics
Notre Dame	Passing	Drew Pyne	23/26, 318 yards, 3 TD, INT
Notre Dame	Rushing	Audric Estimé	6 carries, 43 yards
Notre Dame	Receiving	Michael Mayer	8 receptions, 98 yards, 2 TD
USC	Passing	Caleb Williams	18/22, 232 yards, TD
USC	Rushing	Austin Jones	25 carries, 154 yards
USC	Receiving	Jordan Addison	3 receptions, 45 yards

=== vs No. 11 Utah (Pac-12 Championship Game) ===
No. 11 Utah Utes (9–3) vs No. 4 USC Trojans (11–1) – Game summary
(2022 Pac-12 Football Championship Game presented by 76)

Quarter	1	2	3	4	Total
No. 11 Utes	3	14	7	23	47
No. 4 Trojans	14	3	0	7	24

at Allegiant Stadium • Paradise, NV

- Date: December 2nd, 2022
- Game time: 5:00 p.m.
- Game weather: Indoors, 59 °F (15 °C)
- Game attendance: 61,195
- Referee: Chris Coyte
- TV announcers (Fox): Jason Benetti (play-by-play), Brock Huard (analyst), Allison Williams (sideline)

Game information

1st quarter

- (11:58) USC – Tahj Washington 2-yard pass from Caleb Williams, Denis Lynch kick (Drive: 7 plays, 75 yards, 3:32; USC 7–0)
- (6:22) UTAH – Jadon Redding 25-yard field goal (Drive: 12 plays, 68 yards, 5:06; USC 7–3)
- (3:40) USC – Raleek Brown 3-yard pass from Caleb Williams, Denis Lynch kick (Drive: 6 plays, 75 yards, 3:18; USC 14–3)

2nd quarter

- (12:14) USC – Denis Lynch 20-yard field goal (Drive: 12 plays, 71 yards, 4:45; USC 17–3)
- (4:42) UTAH – Ja'Quinden Jackson 8-yard run, Jadon Redding kick (Drive: 11 plays, 63 yards, 6:39; USC 17–10)
- (0:11) UTAH – Jaylen Dixon 4-yard pass from Cameron Rising, Jadon Redding kick (Drive: 14 plays, 81 yards, 1:44; USC 17–17)

3rd quarter

- (10:48 UTAH – Money Parks 57-yard pass from Cameron Rising, Jadon Redding kick (Drive: 3 plays, 48 yards, 1:03; Utah 24–17)

4th quarter

- (15:00) UTAH – Jadon Redding 35-yard field goal (Drive: 9 plays, 41 yards, 5:15; Utah 27–17)
- (11:37) USC – Mario Williams 12-yard pass from Caleb Williams, Denis Lynch kick (Drive: 9 plays, 75 yards, 4:04; Utah 27–24)
- (10:52 UTAH – Thomas Yassmin 60-yard pass from Cameron Rising, Jadon Redding kick (Drive: 2 plays, 75 yards, 0:44; Utah 34–24)
- (6:18) UTAH – Ja'Quinden Jackson 53-yard run (Drive: 3 plays, 46 yards, 1:38; Utah 40–24)
- (2:39) UTAH – Micah Bernard 23-yard run, Jadon Redding kick (Drive: 3 plays, 38 yards, 1:39; Utah 47–24)

With the loss, USC was knocked out of playoff contention, letting Ohio State taking over the #4 seed.

Statistics	UTAH	USC
First downs	25	19
Total yards	69–533	68–419
Rushes/yards	35–223	27–56
Passing yards	310	363
Passing: Comp–Att–Int	22–34–0	28–41–1
Time of possession	29:49	30:11

Team	Category	Player	Statistics
Utah	Passing	Cameron Rising	22/34, 310 yards, 3 TD
Utah	Rushing	Ja'Quinden Jackson	13 carries, 105 yards, 2 TD
Utah	Receiving	Money Parks	4 receptions, 88 yards, TD
USC	Passing	Caleb Williams	28/41, 363 yards, 3 TD, INT
USC	Rushing	Austin Jones	15 carries, 35 yards
USC	Receiving	Tahj Washington	6 receptions, 93 yards, TD

=== vs No. 16 Tulane (Cotton Bowl) ===
No. 16 Tulane Green Wave (11–2) vs No. 10 USC Trojans (11–2)– Game summary
(2023 Goodyear Cotton Bowl Classic)

Quarter	1	2	3	4	Total
No. 16 Green Wave	0	14	16	16	46
No. 10 Trojans	7	21	7	10	45

at AT&T Stadium • Arlington, TX

- Date: January 2nd, 2023
- Game time: 12:00 p.m. CST
- Game weather: Indoor
- Game attendance: 55,329
- Referee: Steve Marlowe
- TV announcers (ESPN): Mark Jones (play-by-play), Robert Griffin III (analyst), Quint Kessenich (sideline)

Game information

First quarter

- (5:58) USC – Michael Jackson III 9-yard pass from Caleb Williams, Denis Lynch kick (Drive: 17 plays, 75 yards, 9:02; USC 7–0)

Second quarter

- (12:33) USC – Terrell Bynum 3-yard pass from Caleb Williams, Denis Lynch kick (Drive: 12 plays, 95 yards, 5:13; USC 14–0)
- (9:30) TUL – Tyjae Spears 3-yard run, Valentino Ambrosio kick (Drive: 8 plays, 75 yards, 3:03; USC 14–7)
- (5:42) TUL – Jha'Quan Jackson 87-yard pass from Michael Pratt, Valentino Ambrosio kick (Drive: 2 plays, 92 yards, 0:50; Tied 14–14)
- (2:21) USC – Raleek Brown 39-yard run, Denis Lynch kick (Drive: 6 plays, 75 yards, 3:21; USC 21–14)
- (0:12) USC – Brenden Rice 4-yard pass from Caleb Williams, Denis Lynch kick (Drive: 6 plays, 68 yards, 1:07; USC 28–14)

Third quarter

- (11:55) TUL – Tyjae Spears 4-yard run, Valentino Ambrosio kick (Drive: 7 plays, 76 yards, 3:05; USC 28–21)
- (4:02) TUL – Valentino Ambrosio 42-yard field goal (Drive: 7 plays, 40 yards, 3:06; USC 28–24)
- (1:24) USC – Brenden Rice 19-yard pass from Caleb Williams, Denis Lynch kick (Drive: 5 plays, 97 yards, 2:38; USC 35–24)
- (0:40) TUL – Tyjae Spears 3-yard run (Drive: 3 plays, 65 yards, 0:44; USC 35–30)

Fourth quarter

- (12:09) USC – Kyron Hudson 4-yard pass from Caleb Williams, Denis Lynch kick (Drive: 7 plays, 47 yards, 3:31; USC 42–30)
- (4:30) USC – Denis Lynch 43-yard field goal (Drive: 11 plays, 46 yards, 6:16; USC 45–30)
- (4:07) TUL – Tyjae Spears 4-yard run, Valentino Ambrosio kick (Drive: 2 plays, 63 yards, 0:23; USC 45–37)
- (3:20) TUL – Team safety (Drive: 2 plays, -1 yards, 0:47; USC 45–39)
- (0:09) TUL – Alex Bauman 6-yard pass from Michael Pratt, Valentino Ambrosio kick (Drive: 12 plays, 66 yards, 3:11; Tulane 46–45)

Statistics	TUL	USC
First downs	16	29
Total yards	539	594
Rushes/yards	34–305	32–132
Passing yards	234	462
Passing: Comp–Att–Int	8–18–0	37–52–1
Time of possession	20:11	39:49

Team	Category	Player	Statistics
Tulane	Passing	Michael Pratt	8/17, 234 yards, 2 TD
Tulane	Rushing	Tyjae Spears	17 carries, 205 yards, 4 TD
Tulane	Receiving	Jha'Quan Jackson	1 reception, 87 yards, TD
USC	Passing	Caleb Williams	37/52, 462 yards, 5 TD, INT
USC	Rushing	Raleek Brown	6 carries, 61 yards, TD
USC	Receiving	Brenden Rice	6 receptions, 174 yards, 2 TD

USC seemed to be in control for most of the contest, but in a shocking turn of events, Tulane scored 16 points in the final four and a half minutes of regulation to snatch the victory from the Trojans. With 4:30 remaining in the game and a 15-point lead, USC's win probability stood at 99.8%.

== Rankings ==
Ranking movements Legend: ██ Increase in ranking ██ Decrease in ranking т = Tied with team above or below
	Week															
Poll	Pre	1	2	3	4	5	6	7	8	9	10	11	12	13	14	Final
AP	14	10	7	7	6	6	7	12	10т	9	8	7	5	4	8	12
Coaches	15	12	8	7	6	6	6	12	11	9	7	6	5	4	8	13
CFP	Not released									9	8	7	6	4	10	Not released

== Statistics ==
=== Team ===
	USC	Opp
Points per game	41	29
Total	579	409
First downs	359	310
Rushing	138	120
Passing	195	162
Penalty	26	28
Rushing yards	2,396	2,237
Avg per attempt	5.1	5.0
Avg per game	171.1	159.8
Rushing touchdowns	30	29
Passing yards	-	-
Att-Comp-Int	515-345-5	460-293-19
Avg per attempt	9.12	8.04
Avg per game	335.43	264.14
Passing touchdowns	43	25
Total offense (Total Plays)		
Avg per play		
Avg per game		
Fumbles-Lost		
Penalties-Yards		
Avg per game		
Punts-Yards		
Avg per punt		
Time of possession/Game		
3rd down conversions		
4th down conversions		
Touchdowns scored		
Field goals-Attempts		
PAT-Attempts		
Attendance		
Games/Avg per Game		
Neutral Site		

=== Individual Leaders ===
==== Offense ====
Passing statistics
#	NAME	POS	RAT	CMP	ATT	YDS	AVG/G	CMP%	TD	INT	LONG
7	Miller Moss	QB	182.9	6	7	81	81	85.7	0	0	40
13	Caleb Williams	QB	221.1	39	49	590	295	79.5	6	0	75
	TOTALS		212.5	45	57	671	335.5	78.9%	6	0	75

Rushing statistics
#	NAME	POS	ATT	GAIN	AVG	TD	LONG	AVG/G
6	Austin Jones	RB	12	86	7.2	2	28	43
14	Raleek Brown	RB	10	55	5.5	1	14	27.5
22	Darwin Barlow	RB	5	16	3.2	1	6	8
26	Travis Dye	RB	19	126	6.6	1	27	62.5
7	Miller Moss	QB	1	10	10.0	0	10	10
13	Caleb Williams	QB	15	72	4.8	0	28	36
4	Mario Williams	WR	1	10	10.0	0	10	5
	TOTALS		64	372	5.8	5	28	186

Receiving statistics
#	NAME	POS	CTH	YDS	AVG	TD	LONG	AVG/G
1	Gary Bryant Jr.	WR	2	15	7.5	0	8	7.5
2	Brenden Rice	WR	2	25	12.5	0	20	12.5
3	Jordan Addison	WR	12	226	18.8	4	75	113
4	Mario Williams	WR	6	117	19.5	1	43	58.5
8	CJ Williams	WR	1	11	11.0	0	11	11
10	Kyron Hudson	WR	3	34	11.3	0	29	17
16	Tahj Washington	WR	4	65	16.25	0	43	32.5
81	Kyle Ford	WR	1	20	20.0	0	20	20
19	Malcolm Epps	TE	1	4	4.0	0	4	2
87	Lake McRee	TE	3	22	7.3	1	9	11
6	Austin Jones	RB	4	52	13.0	0	26	26
14	Raleek Brown	RB	2	40	20.0	0	40	20
26	Travis Dye	RB	4	40	10.0	0	19	20
	TOTALS		45	671	14.9	6	75	335.5

==== Defense ====
Defense statistics
#	NAME	POS	SOLO	AST	TOT	TFL-YDS	SACK-YDS	INT-YDS	BU	QBH	FR	FF	BLK	SAF	TD
31	Tyrone Taleni	DL	2	–	2	2.0–8	1.0–7	–	–	–	–	–	–	–	–
47	Stanley Ta’ufo’ou	DL	2	1	3	1.0–1	–	–	–	–	–	–	–	–	–
49	Tuli Tuipulotu	DL	6	1	7	4.0–19	1.0–11	–	1	–	–	1	–	–	–
51	Solomon Byrd	DL	2	2	4	2.0–11	2.0–11	–	1	–	–	–	–	–	–
77	Jamar Sekona	DL	3	–	3	1.0–4	1.0–4	–	–	1	–	–	–	–	–
79	De’jon Benton	DL	1	4	5	0.5-	–	–	–	–	–	–	–	–	–
91	Brandon Pili	DL	2	1	3	–	–	–	–	–	–	–	–	–	–
99	Nick Figueroa	DL	3	1	4	1.5–7	1.0–5	–	1	1	–	–	–	–	–
0	Korey Foreman	RUSH	2	2	4	–	–	–	–	–	–	–	–	–	–
58	Solomon Tuliaupupu	RUSH	1	2	3	1.0–3	0.5–2	–	–	–	–	–	–	–	–
10	Ralen Goforth	LB	2	–	2	–	–	1–31	–	–	–	–	–	–	1
18	Eric Gentry	LB	12	5	17	0.5–2	0.5–2	–	–	–	–	–	–	–	–
44	Tuasivi Nomura	LB	–	4	4	0.5–1	–	–	1	–	–	–	–	–	–
53	Shane Lee	LB	11	1	12	3.0–10	1.0–8	1–40	1	–	–	–	–	–	1
4	Max Williams	DB	9	3	12	–	–	1–32	–	1	–	1	–	–	–
6	Mekhi Blackmon	DB	5	5	10	0.5–3	–	1–17	1	–	1	–	–	–	–
7	Calen Bullock	DB	7	2	9	–	–	1–93	–	–	–	–	–	–	1
14	Jacobe Covington	DB	2	–	2	–	–	–	–	–	–	–	–	–	–
15	Anthony Beavers Jr.	DB	2	1	3	1.5–2	–	–	–	–	–	–	–	–	–
17	Micah Croom	DB	1	–	1	–	–	–	–	–	–	–	–	–	–
19	Jaylin Smith	DB	2	3	5	–	–	–	–	–	–	–	–	–	–
21	Latrell McCutchin	DB	2	–	2	1.0–5	1.0–5	–	–	–	–	–	–	–	–
22	Ceyair Wright	DB	3	1	4	–	–	–	1	–	–	–	–	–	–
28	Xamarion Gordon	DB	2	–	2	–	–	1–0	–	–	–	–	–	–	–
	Team		2	1	3	–	–	–	–	–	–	–	–	–	–
	TOTAL		86	40	126	20.0–76	9.0–55	6–213	7	3	1	2	-	-	3

Key: POS: Position, SOLO: Solo Tackles, AST: Assisted Tackles, TOT: Total Tackles, TFL: Tackles-for-loss, SACK: Quarterback Sacks, INT: Interceptions, BU: Passes Broken Up, PD: Passes Defended, QBH: Quarterback Hits, FR: Fumbles Recovered, FF: Forced Fumbles, BLK: Kicks or Punts Blocked, SAF: Safeties, TD : Touchdown

==== Special teams ====
Kicking statistics
#	NAME	POS	XPM	XPA	XP%	FGM	FGA	FG%	1–19	20–29	30–39	40–49	50+	LNG
46	Denis Lynch	K	14	14	100.0%	3	4	75.0%	0/0	1/1	0/1	2/2	0/0	45
	TOTALS		14	14	100.0%	3	4	75.0%	0/0	1/1	0/1	2/2	0/0	45

Kickoff statistics
#	NAME	POS	KICKS	YDS	AVG	TB	OB
38	Alex Stadthaus	K	18	1157	64.3	11	0
	TOTALS		18	1157	64.3	11	0

Punting statistics
#	NAME	POS	PUNTS	YDS	AVG	LONG	TB	I–20	50+	BLK
42	Aadyn Sleep-Dalton	P	3	90	30.0	36	0	1	0	0
	TOTALS		3	90	30.0	36	0	1	0	0

Kick return statistics
#	NAME	POS	RTNS	YDS	AVG	TD	LNG
2	Brenden Rice	WR	1	16	16.0	0	16
	TOTALS		1	16	16.0	0	16

Punt return statistics
#	NAME	POS	RTNS	YDS	AVG	TD	LONG
1	Gary Bryant Jr.	WR	2	4	2.0	0	5
3	Jordan Addison	WR	1	−3	−3.0	0	0
	TOTALS		3	1	0.3	0	5

=== Scoring ===
==== USC vs. non-conference opponents ====
	1	2	3	4	Total
USC	7	24	28	7	66
Opponents	7	7	0	0	14

==== USC vs. Pac-12 opponents ====
	1	2	3	4	Total
USC	21	14	6	0	41
Pac-12 opponents	7	7	0	14	28

==== USC vs. all opponents ====
	1	2	3	4	Total
USC	28	38	34	14	114
Opponents	14	14	0	14	42

== After the season ==
=== Awards and honors ===
==== Pac-12 Conference Individual awards ====
Recipient	Award (Pac-12 Conference)	Date awarded	Ref.
Caleb Williams	Offensive Player of the Year	December 6, 2022	
Andrew Vorhees	Morris Trophy	December 20, 2022	
Tuli Tuipulotu	Defensive Player of the Year	December 6, 2022	
Tuli Tuipulotu	Morris Trophy	December 20, 2022	
Nick Figueroa	Scholar-Athlete of the Year	December 5, 2022	

==== Individual Yearly Awards ====
Recipient	Award	Date awarded	Ref.
Tuli Tuipulotu	Bronko Nagurski Trophy (finalist)	5 December	
Tuli Tuipulotu	Rotary Lombardi Award (finalist)	7 December	
Tuli Tuipulotu	Bednarik Award (finalist)	8 December	
Tuli Tuipulotu	Lott IMPACT Trophy (finalist)	11 December	
Tuli Tuipulotu	Polynesian College Football Player Of The Year Award	13 December	
Caleb Williams	Walter Camp Award Winner	8 December	–
Caleb Williams	Maxwell Award Winner	8 December	
Caleb Williams	Davey O'Brien Award (finalist)	8 December	–
Caleb Williams	Heisman Trophy Winner	10 December	
Caleb Williams	Manning Award (finalist)	January 2023	
Brett Neilon	Rimington Trophy (finalist)	8 December	–
USC Offensive line	Joe Moore Award (semifinalist)	–	
Lincoln Riley	Eddie Robinson Award (finalist)	8 December	–

==== All-America ====
PFF
Player	Position	1st/2nd team
Caleb Williams	QB	1st
Andrew Vorhees	OG	1st
Calen Bullock	S	1st
Jordan Addison	WR	2nd
Brett Neilon	C	2nd
Tuli Tuipulotu	DL	2nd
Mekhi Blackmon	CB	2nd

CBS Sports / 247Sports
Player	Position	1st/2nd team
Caleb Williams	QB	1st
Tuli Tuipulotu	DL	1st
Andrew Vorhees	OG	2nd
Brett Neilon	C	2nd
Calen Bullock	DB	Honorable Mention

The Associated Press
Player	Position	1st/2nd team
Caleb Williams	QB	1st
Andrew Vorhees	OG	1st
Tuli Tuipulotu	DL	1st
Brett Neilon	C	3rd
Mekhi Blackmon	CB	3rd

Walter Camp
Player	Position	1st/2nd team
Caleb Williams	QB	1st
Tuli Tuipulotu	DL	1st
Andrew Vorhees	OG	2nd

==== PAC-12 Conference ====
PAC-12
Player	Position	1st/2nd team
Caleb Williams	QB	1st
Jordan Addison	WR	1st
Andrew Vorhees	OG	1st
Tuli Tuipulotu	DL	1st
Mekhi Blackmon	CB	1st
Travis Dye	RB	2nd
Calen Bullock	S	2nd
Brett Neilon	C	2nd
Justin Dedich	OG	Honorable Mention
Jonah Monheim	OT	Honorable Mention
Shane Lee	LB	Honorable Mention
Tahj Washington	WR	Honorable Mention
Max Williams	DB	Honorable Mention

PFF
Player	Position	1st/2nd team
Caleb Williams	QB	1st
Jordan Addison	WR	1st
Brett Neilon	C	1st
Andrew Vorhees	OG	1st
Justin Dedich	OG	1st
Tuli Tuipulotu	DL	1st
Tyrone Taleni	DL	1st
Mekhi Blackmon	CB	1st
Calen Bullock	S	1st
Travis Dye	RB	2nd
Jonah Monheim	OT	2nd

All-Pac-12 Academic
Player	Position	Class	Major	Ref.
HM = Honorable mention. Source:

NCAA Recognized All-American Honors
Player	AP	AFCA	FWAA	TSN	WCFF	Designation
The NCAA recognizes a selection to all five of the AP, AFCA, FWAA, TSN and WCFF first teams for unanimous selections and three of five for consensus selections. HM = Honorable mention. Source:

Other All-American Honors
Player	AP	Athletic	Athlon	BR	CBS Sports	CFN	ESPN	FOX Sports	Phil Steele	SI	USA Today
Caleb Williams	Player of the Year				Player of the Year						

=== Bowl games ===
==== Senior Bowl ====
Player	#	Position	Class
Andrew Vorhees	–	OG	(redshirt) Senior
Mekhi Blackmon	–	CB	(redshirt) Senior

==== East–West Shrine Bowl ====
Player	#	Position	Class
Travis Dye	–	RB	(redshirt) Senior
Josh Falo	–	TE	(redshirt) Senior

==== NFLPA Collegiate Bowl ====
Player	#	Position	Class
Bobby Haskins	–	OT	(redshirt) Senior

=== NFL draft ===
The NFL draft will be held at Arrowhead Stadium in Kansas City, MO on April 27–29, 2023.

Trojans who were picked in the 2023 NFL Draft:

Round	Pick	Player	Position	NFL Team	NFL Jersey #
1	23	Jordan Addison	WR	Minnesota Vikings	3
2	54	Tuli Tuipulotu	DL	Los Angeles Chargers	45
3	102	Mekhi Blackmon	CB	Minnesota Vikings	11
7	229	Andrew Vorhees	OG	Baltimore Ravens	72
UDFA	-	Travis Dye	RB	New York Jets	
UDFA	-	Brandon Pili	DL	Miami Dolphins	96
UDFA	-	Bobby Haskins	OT	Chicago Bears	71
UDFA	-	Terrell Bynum	WR	Los Angeles Chargers	35
UDFA	-	Mo Hasan	QB	Tennessee Titans	
Rookie Camp	-	Josh Falo	TE	New York Jets	
		Brett Neilon	C		
		Brandon Outlaw	WR / RB		
		Micah Croom	S		

==== NFL Draft combine ====
Two members of the 2022 team were invited to participate in drills at the 2023 NFL Scouting Combine.

2023 NFL combine participants
Name	POS	HT	WT	Arms	Hands	40	10-yd Split	Bench press	Vert jump	Broad jump	3-cone drill	20-yd shuttle	Ref
Mekhi Blackmon	CB	5’ 11’’	178	31’’	9 1/4’’	4.47	1.54	11	36’’	10’ 5’’	DNP		
Tuli Tuipulotu	DL	6’ 3’’	266	32 1/4’’	10 1/8’’	DNP							
Jordan Addison	WR	5’ 11’’	173	30 7/8’’	8 3/4’’	4.49	1.56	DNP	34’’	10’ 2’’	DNP		
Andrew Vorhees	OG	6’ 6’’	310	32 1/8’’	10’’	DNP		38	29’’	8’ 9’’	DNP		
Travis Dye	RB	5’ 10’’	201	28 7/8’’	9 1/4’’	DNP							

† Top performer

DNP = Did not participate

==== USC Pro Day ====
2023 USC Pro Day
Name	POS	HT	WT	Arms	Hands	40	Bench press	Vert jump	Broad jump	3-cone drill	20-yd shuttle	60-yd shuttle	Ref
Jordan Addison	WR	–	–	–	–	–	–	–	–	–	–	–	–
Mekhi Blackmon	CB	–	–	–	–	–	–	–	–	–	–	–	–
Terrell Bynum	WR	–	–	–	–	–	–	–	–	–	–	–	–
Micah Croom	DB	–	–	–	–	–	–	–	–	–	–	–	–
Travis Dye	RB	–	–	–	–	–	–	–	–	–	–	–	–
Josh Falo	TE	–	–	–	–	–	–	–	–	–	–	–	–
Mo Hasan	QB	–	–	–	–	–	–	–	–	–	–	–	–
Bobby Haskins	OT	–	–	–	–	–	–	–	–	–	–	–	–
Brett Neilon	C	–	–	–	–	–	–	–	–	–	–	–	–
Brandon Outlaw	RB	–	–	–	–	–	–	–	–	–	–	–	–
Brandon Pili	DL	–	–	–	–	–	–	–	–	–	–	–	–
Tuli Tuipulotu	DL	–	–	–	–	–	–	–	–	–	–	–	–
Andrew Vorhees	OG	–	–	–	–	–	–	–	–	–	–	–	–
Erik Krommenhoek	TE (2021)	–	–	–	–	–	–	–	–	–	–	–	–
Vavae Malepeai	RB (2021)	–	–	–	–	–	–	–	–	–	–	–	–

† Top performer

DNP = Did not participate

== Notes ==
- November 28, 2021 – Lincoln Riley Named New USC Football Head Coach.
