= Alex Bauman =

American football player

Profile
- Position: Tight end
- Class: Senior

Personal information
- Listed height: 6 ft 5 in (1.96 m)
- Listed weight: 250 lb (113 kg)

Career information
- High school: Red Bank Catholic (Red Bank, New Jersey)
- College: Tulane (2022–2024); Miami (FL) (2025)
- Stats at ESPN

Alex Bauman is an American college football tight end. He previously played for the Miami Hurricanes and Tulane Green Wave.

== Early life ==
Bauman grew up in Red Bank, New Jersey and attended Red Bank Catholic High School, where he played basketball and football. As a senior, he had 87 tackles and five sacks as a defensive end and also caught 26 passes for 432 yards and six touchdowns as a tight end on offense. Bauman was rated a three-star recruit and committed to play college football at Tulane, who recruited him to play tight end instead of on defense, over offers from Coastal Carolina, Notre Dame, Rutgers, and Wake Forest.

== College career ==
=== Tulane ===
Bauman began his college football career with the Tulane Green Wave. He had eight receptions for 112 and a touchdown during his freshman season. In the 2023 Cotton Bowl Classic against USC he caught three passes for 46 yards, including a six-yard touchdown reception with nine seconds left to put the Green Wave ahead. Bauman had 35 receptions for 286 yards and five touchdowns as a sophomore. As a junior, Bauman caught 20 passes for 212 yards with seven touchdown receptions. After the season, he entered the NCAA transfer portal.

=== Miami ===
In 2025, Bauman transferred to play for the Miami Hurricanes. Bauman is best known for missing a routine block on a Punt in the National Championship which led to a blocked punt.

=== Michigan ===
In October 2026, Bauman committed to play for the Michigan Wolverines midseason following being granted a preliminary injunction after filing a lawsuit against the NCAA in order to gain a fifth year of eligibility. He enrolled at the University of Michigan in the School of Social Work.

== Personal life ==
Bauman's older brother, Kevin, played for the Notre Dame Fighting Irish.
