= Tuli Tuipulotu =

American football player (born 2002)

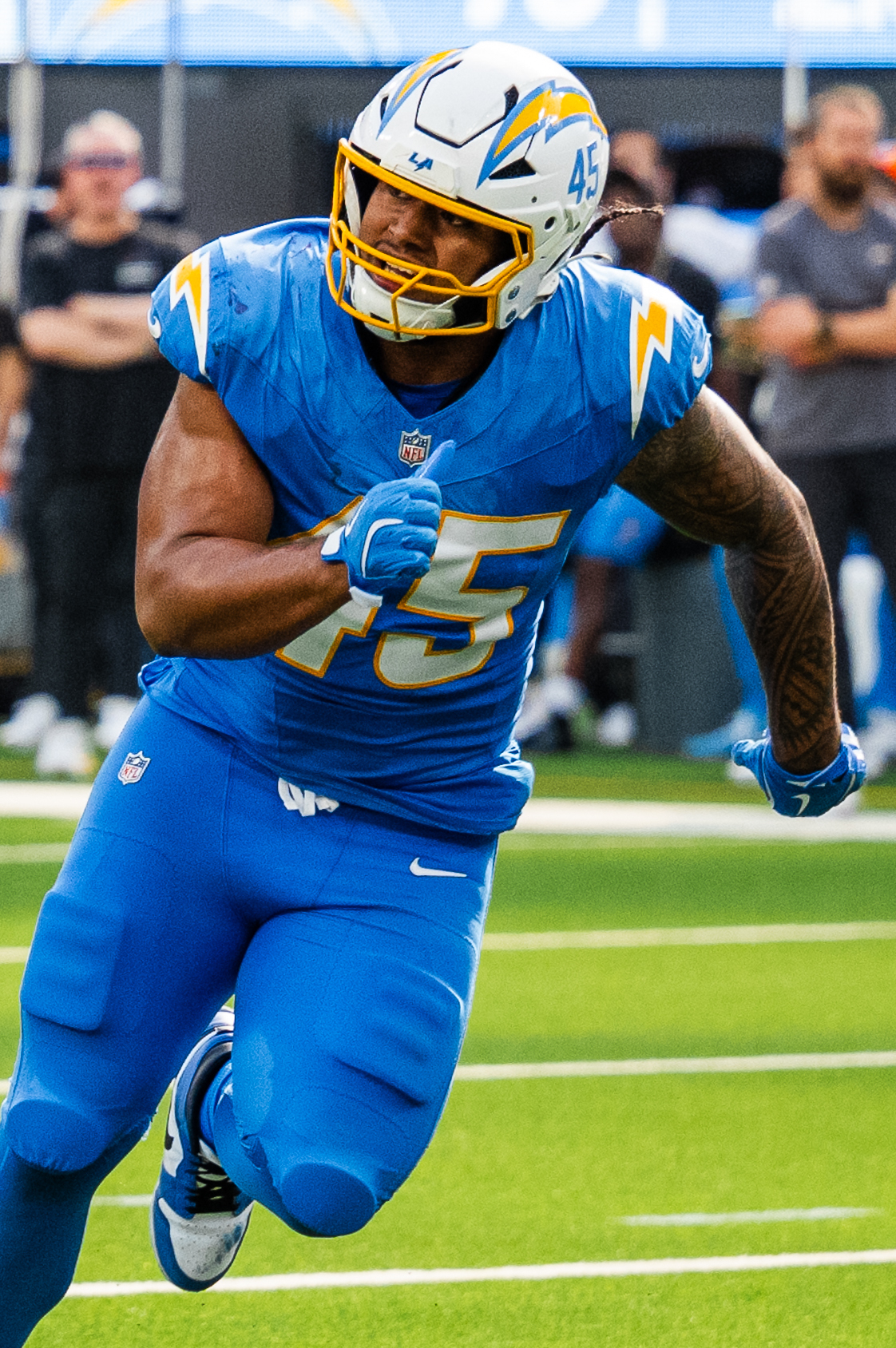
- Tuipulotu in 2025

No. 45 – Los Angeles Chargers
- Position: Outside linebacker
- Roster status: Active

Personal information
- Born: September 3, 2002 (age 24); Hawthorne, California, U.S.
- Listed height: 6 ft 3 in (1.91 m)
- Listed weight: 266 lb (121 kg)

Career information
- High school: Lawndale (Lawndale, California)
- College: USC (2020–2022)
- NFL draft: 2023: 2nd round, 54th overall pick

Career history
- Los Angeles Chargers (2023–present)

Awards and highlights
- Pro Bowl (2025); PFWA All-Rookie Team (2023); Morris Trophy (2022); Unanimous All-American (2022); Polynesian College Football Player of the Year (2022); 2× first-team All-Pac-12 (2021, 2022)

Career NFL statistics as of Week 5, 2026
- Tackles: 166
- Sacks: 28.0
- Forced fumbles: 7
- Fumble recoveries: 3
- Pass deflections: 9
- Stats at Pro Football Reference

Tuli Tuipulotu (too-EE-poo-LOE-too; born September 3, 2002) is an American professional football outside linebacker for the Los Angeles Chargers of the National Football League (NFL). He played college football for the USC Trojans, where he was named the Pat Tillman Defensive Player of the Year and a unanimous All-American in 2022. Tuipulotu was selected by the Chargers in the second round of the 2023 NFL draft.

== Early life ==
Tuipulotu grew up in Hawthorne, California and attended Lawndale High School. He was rated a three-star recruit and committed to playing college football at USC over offers from California, Utah, Washington, and Stanford.

== College career ==
As a freshman, Tuipulotu played in all six games with three starts in USC's COVID-19-shortened 2020 season and had 22 tackles with 2.5 tackles for a loss of and two sacks. He was named first-team All-Pac-12 Conference after recording 48 tackles, 7.5 tackles for loss, and a team 5.5 sacks. Tuipulotu was named a team captain entering his junior season. He finished the season with an FBS-leading 13.5 sacks, and was named a finalist for the Bednarik, Nagurski, and Hendricks awards.

== Professional career ==
Pre-draft measurables
| Height | Weight | Arm length | Hand span | Wingspan |
|---|---|---|---|---|
| 6 ft 3 in (1.91 m) | 266 lb (121 kg) | 32 1/4 in (0.82 m) | 10 1/8 in (0.26 m) | 6 ft 5 7/8 in (1.98 m) |
All values from NFL Combine

Tuipulotu was selected by the Los Angeles Chargers in the second round, 54th overall, of the 2023 NFL draft. He was named to the PFWA NFL All-Rookie Team. In the 2025 season, he was named to his first Pro Bowl.

== Career statistics ==
Legend
| **Bold** | Career high |

=== NFL ===
==== Regular season ====
| Year | Team | Games | | Tackles | | | | | Interceptions | | | | | | Fumbles | | | | |
| Year | Team | GP | GS | Cmb | Solo | Ast | Sck | TFL | Int | Yds | Avg | Lng | TD | PD | FF | Fum | FR | Yds | TD |
|---|---|---|---|---|---|---|---|---|---|---|---|---|---|---|---|---|---|---|---|
| 2023 | LAC | 17 | 11 | **53** | **37** | **16** | 4.5 | 8 | 0 | 0 | 0.0 | 0 | 0 | 1 | **2** | 0 | **1** | 0 | 0 |
| 2024 | LAC | 17 | 9 | 42 | 26 | **16** | 8.5 | 11 | 0 | 0 | 0.0 | 0 | 0 | 2 | 1 | 0 | 0 | 0 | 0 |
| 2025 | LAC | 16 | 16 | 49 | 35 | 14 | **13.0** | **20** | 0 | 0 | 0.0 | 0 | 0 | **3** | **2** | 0 | **1** | **11** | 0 |
| 2026 | LAC | 5 | 5 | 22 | 12 | 10 | 2.0 | 2 | 1 | 4 | 4.0 | 4 | 0 | 3 | 2 | 0 | 1 | 0 | 0 |
| Career | | 55 | 41 | 166 | 110 | 56 | 28.0 | 41 | 1 | 4 | 4.0 | 4 | 0 | 9 | 7 | 0 | 3 | 11 | 0 |

==== Postseason ====
| Year | Team | Games | | Tackles | | | | | Interceptions | | | | | | Fumbles | | | | |
| Year | Team | GP | GS | Cmb | Solo | Ast | Sck | TFL | Int | Yds | Avg | Lng | TD | PD | FF | Fum | FR | Yds | TD |
|---|---|---|---|---|---|---|---|---|---|---|---|---|---|---|---|---|---|---|---|
| 2024 | LAC | 1 | 0 | 0 | 0 | 0 | 0.0 | 0 | 0 | 0 | 0.0 | 0 | 0 | 0 | 0 | 0 | 0 | 0 | 0 |
| 2025 | LAC | 1 | 1 | **2** | **2** | 0 | **1.0** | **1** | 0 | 0 | 0.0 | 0 | 0 | 0 | 0 | 0 | 0 | 0 | 0 |
| Career | | 2 | 1 | 2 | 2 | 0 | 1.0 | 1 | 0 | 0 | 0.0 | 0 | 0 | 0 | 0 | 0 | 0 | 0 | 0 |

=== College ===
Legend
| Led the NCAA |

| Year | Team | GP | Tackles | | | | | Interceptions | | | | | Fumbles | | | |
| Year | Team | GP | Cmb | Solo | Ast | Sck | TFL | Int | Yds | Avg | TD | PD | FF | FR | Yds | TD |
|---|---|---|---|---|---|---|---|---|---|---|---|---|---|---|---|---|
| 2020 | USC | 6 | 22 | 12 | 10 | 2.0 | 2.5 | 0 | 0 | — | 0 | 0 | 0 | 0 | 0 | 0 |
| 2021 | USC | 12 | **48** | 24 | **24** | 5.5 | 7.5 | 0 | 0 | — | 0 | 2 | **2** | **1** | 0 | **1** |
| 2022 | USC | 14 | 46 | **31** | 15 | **13.5** | **22.0** | 0 | 0 | — | 0 | **3** | **2** | 0 | 0 | 0 |
| Career | | 32 | 116 | 67 | 49 | 21.0 | 32.0 | 0 | 0 | — | 0 | 5 | 4 | 1 | 0 | 1 |

== Personal life ==
Tuipulotu's older brother, Marlon Tuipulotu, also played defensive tackle at USC and currently plays in the National Football League for the New York Giants. He is also a cousin of former USC and current Denver Broncos safety Talanoa Hufanga.

He is of Tongan descent.
