= Shane Lee (American football) =

American football player (born 2000)

Profile
- Position: Linebacker

Personal information
- Born: December 12, 2000 (age 25)
- Listed height: 6 ft 0 in (1.83 m)
- Listed weight: 240 lb (109 kg)

Career information
- High school: Saint Frances Academy (Baltimore, Maryland)
- College: Alabama (2019–2021); USC (2022–2023)
- NFL draft: 2024: undrafted

Career history
- Los Angeles Chargers (2024)*
- * Offseason or practice squad member only

Awards and highlights
- CFP national champion (2020)

Shane Lee (born December 12, 2000) is an American professional football linebacker. He previously played college football at Alabama and USC.

== Early life ==
Lee grew up in Burtonsville, Maryland and attended St. John's College High School in Chevy Chase, Washington, D.C. before transferring to Saint Frances Academy in Baltimore, Maryland during his junior year. In Lee's junior season, he notched 78 tackles, two sacks, two interceptions, three forced fumbles, and three fumble recoveries. Coming out of high school, Lee was rated as a four star recruit where he decided to commit to play college football for the Alabama Crimson Tide.

== College career ==
=== Alabama ===
Lee made his first career start in week one of the 2019 season where he notched a team high six tackles. In week eleven, Lee recorded his first career interception, as he helped the Crimson Tide to a win over Mississippi State. Lee finished his stellar freshman season in 2019 notching 86 tackles with six and a half being for a loss, four and a half sacks, an interception, and two forced fumbles, where for his performance he was named to the all-SEC freshman team, and was named a freshman all-American. Over the next two seasons in 2020 and 2021, Lee would tally just nine tackles, a sack, and a forced fumble. After the conclusion of the 2021 season, Lee decided to enter his name into the NCAA transfer portal.

=== USC ===
Lee decided to transfer to play for the USC Trojans. Heading into the 2022 season with the Trojans, Lee was named one of the team's captains. During the 2022 season, Lee notched 75 tackles with six and a half being for a loss, two and a half sacks, and two interceptions. In Lee's final collegiate season, he posted 28 tackles with two being for a loss, and a sack.

== Professional career ==
Pre-draft measurables
Height	Weight	Arm length	Hand span	40-yard dash	10-yard split	20-yard split	20-yard shuttle	Three-cone drill	Vertical jump	Broad jump	Bench press
6 ft 0 1/5 in (1.83 m)	243 lb (110 kg)	31 1/2 in (0.80 m)	9 in (0.23 m)	4.67 s	1.86 s	2.70 s	4.53 s	7.13 s	33.5 in (0.85 m)	9 ft 6 in (2.90 m)	21 reps
All values from Pro Day

After not being selected in the 2024 NFL draft, Lee signed with the Los Angeles Chargers as an undrafted free agent. He was waived on August 27.
