= Mario Williams (wide receiver) =

American football player (born 2003)

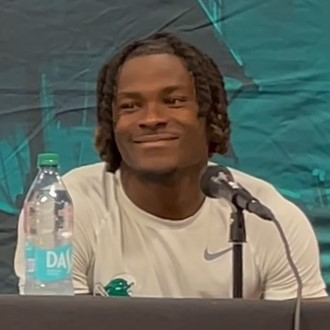
- Williams after the 2024 Gasparilla Bowl

Profile
- Position: Wide receiver

Personal information
- Born: January 21, 2003 (age 23); Tampa, Florida, U.S.
- Listed height: 5 ft 9 in (1.75 m)
- Listed weight: 178 lb (81 kg)

Career information
- High school: Plant City (Plant City, Florida)
- College: Oklahoma (2021); USC (2022–2023); Tulane (2024)
- NFL draft: 2025: undrafted

Career history
- Los Angeles Rams (2025)*
- * Offseason or practice squad member only

Awards and highlights
- Second-team All-AAC (2024)
- Stats at Pro Football Reference

Mario Williams (born January 21, 2003) is an American professional football wide receiver. He played college football for the Oklahoma Sooners, USC Trojans, and Tulane Green Wave.

== Early life ==
Williams grew up in Tampa, Florida, and attended Plant City High School. As a senior, he caught 40 passes for 743 yards with 8 touchdowns in nine games played and was named a second team All-American by Sports Illustrated. Williams was considered a consensus top-50 recruit in his class nationally. He committed to play college football at Oklahoma over offers Alabama, Florida, Georgia, and LSU. Williams finished his high school career with 160 receptions for 3,191 yards and 45 touchdowns.

== College career ==
=== Oklahoma ===
Williams joined the Oklahoma Sooners as an early enrollee. Williams was named the Big 12 Conference Newcomer of the Week after catching 5 passes for 100 yards and one touchdown in a 52-21 win over Texas Tech. He finished the season with 35 receptions for 380 yards and four touchdowns. Shortly after the end of the season and the departure of Oklahoma head coach Lincoln Riley for USC, Williams entered the transfer portal.

=== USC ===
Williams ultimately transferred to USC. He caught 40 passes for 631 yards and five touchdowns in his first season with the Trojans. On December 15, 2023, Williams announced that he would be entering the transfer portal for the second time.

=== Tulane ===
On January 15, 2024, he announced that he would transfer to Tulane. Starting 10 of 14 games, Williams caught 60 passes for 1,031 yards and six touchdowns and was named second team All-AAC. On December 28, 2024, Williams declared for the 2025 NFL draft.

=== Statistics ===
College statistics
Season	Team	Games		Receiving				Returning			
Season	Team	GP	GS	Rec	Yards	Avg	TD	Att	Yards	Avg	TD
2021	Oklahoma	12	1	35	380	10.9	4	5	108	21.6	0
2022	USC	12	9	40	631	15.8	5	2	7	3.5	0
2023	USC	12	5	29	305	10.5	2	0	0	0.0	0
2024	Tulane	14	10	60	1,031	17.2	6	0	0	0.0	0
Career		50	25	164	2,347	14.3	17	7	115	16.4	0

== Professional career ==
Pre-draft measurables
Height	Weight	Arm length	Hand span	Wingspan	40-yard dash	10-yard split	20-yard split	20-yard shuttle	Three-cone drill	Vertical jump	Broad jump
5 ft 9 in (1.75 m)	170 lb (77 kg)	29 3/4 in (0.76 m)	8 5/8 in (0.22 m)	6 ft 1 3/8 in (1.86 m)	4.50 s	1.53 s	2.57 s	4.16 s	6.96 s	33.0 in (0.84 m)	10 ft 0 in (3.05 m)
All values from Pro Day

After going unselected in the 2025 NFL draft, Williams signed with the Los Angeles Rams as an undrafted free agent on April 28, 2025. On August 19, he was waived by Los Angeles with an injury designation. He signed a reserve/future contract with Los Angeles on January 15, 2026.

On August 18, 2026, Williams was waived by the Rams with an injury designation.
