= Latrell McCutchin Sr. =

American football player (born 2002)

Profile
- Position: Cornerback

Personal information
- Born: November 15, 2002 (age 23)
- Listed height: 6 ft 2 in (1.88 m)
- Listed weight: 191 lb (87 kg)

Career information
- High school: Lyndon B. Johnson (Austin, Texas)
- College: Oklahoma (2021); USC (2022); Houston (2023–2025)
- NFL draft: 2026: undrafted

Career history
- Tennessee Titans (2026)*
- * Offseason or practice squad member only

Awards and highlights
- Second-team All-Big 12 (2025)
- Stats at Pro Football Reference

Latrell McCutchin Sr. (born November 15, 2002) is an American professional football cornerback. He played college football for the Houston Cougars, the Oklahoma Sooners and for the USC Trojans.

== Early life ==
McCutchin Sr. attended Lyndon B. Johnson High School in Austin, Texas. Coming out of high school, he was rated as a four-star recruit by 247Sports, and committed to play college football for the Oklahoma Sooners over offers from schools such as Alabama, Georgia, Florida, Ohio State, and Texas.

== College career ==
=== Oklahoma ===
As a freshman in 2021, McCutchin Sr. played in nine games, totaling nine tackles, a pass deflection, and two forced fumbles. After the conclusion of the season, he entered the NCAA transfer portal.

=== USC ===
McCutchin Sr. transferred to play for USC Trojans. In 2022, he posted 22 tackles while making two starts. After the season, McCutchin Sr. once again entered the NCAA transfer portal.

=== Houston ===
McCutchin Sr. transferred to play for Houston Cougars. Due to transferring twice, he was forced to sit out the entire 2023 season. He returned in 2024, starting in 12 games, notching 37 tackles. In 2025, McCutchin Sr. posted 51 tackles and nine pass deflections. After the conclusion of the season, he declared for the 2026 NFL draft. McCutchin Sr. also accepted an invite to participate in the 2026 NFL Scouting Combine.

== Professional career ==
Pre-draft measurables
Height	Weight	Arm length	Hand span	Wingspan	40-yard dash	10-yard split	20-yard split	20-yard shuttle	Three-cone drill	Vertical jump	Broad jump
6 ft 1 7/8 in (1.88 m)	191 lb (87 kg)	31 1/4 in (0.79 m)	8 1/2 in (0.22 m)	6 ft 5 3/4 in (1.97 m)	4.43 s	1.58 s	2.60 s	4.18 s	7.00 s	38.5 in (0.98 m)	10 ft 11 in (3.33 m)
All values from NFL Combine

On April 30, 2026, after going unselected in the 2026 NFL draft, McCutchin signed with the Tennessee Titans as an undrafted free agent. On July 27, he was waived by the Titans.

== Personal life ==
McCutchin Sr. is the older brother of Houston defensive end Latreveon McCutchin.
