= Mekhi Blackmon =

American football player (born 1999)

No. 29 – Cleveland Browns
- Position: Cornerback
- Roster status: Active

Personal information
- Born: March 18, 1999 (age 27); Hayward, California, U.S.
- Listed height: 5 ft 11 in (1.80 m)
- Listed weight: 178 lb (81 kg)

Career information
- High school: Menlo-Atherton (Atherton, California)
- College: San Mateo (2017); Colorado (2018–2021); USC (2022)
- NFL draft: 2023: 3rd round, 102nd overall pick

Career history
- Minnesota Vikings (2023–2024); Indianapolis Colts (2025); Cleveland Browns (2026–present)

Awards and highlights
- First-team All-Pac-12 (2022)

Career NFL statistics as of Week 5, 2026
- Total tackles: 116
- Fumble recoveries: 1
- Pass deflections: 17
- Interceptions: 3
- Sacks: 1
- Stats at Pro Football Reference

Mekhi Blackmon (born March 18, 1999) is an American professional football cornerback for the Cleveland Browns of the National Football League (NFL). He played college football for the San Mateo Bulldogs, the Colorado Buffaloes and the USC Trojans. Blackmon was selected by the Minnesota Vikings in the third round of the 2023 NFL draft. He has also played for the Indianapolis Colts.

== Early life ==
Blackmon was born in Hayward, California. He grew up in East Palo Alto, California and attended Menlo-Atherton High School.

== College career ==
Blackmon played one year of community college football at College of San Mateo before committing to Colorado in 2018.

Blackmon played four years at Colorado before deciding to transfer to USC. In his collegiate career he totaled 142 tackles, 4 being for a loss, 1 sack, 5 interceptions, 24 pass deflections, 2 fumble recoveries, and 2 forced fumbles. His best collegiate year occurred during the 2022 season when he posted 66 tackles, 2 going for a loss, 3 interceptions, 12 pass deflections, a fumble recovery, and a forced fumble. For his performance, he was named First Team All-Pac-12 Conference.

He was projected to be a fifth to sixth round selection in the 2023 NFL draft.

== Professional career ==
Pre-draft measurables
Height	Weight	Arm length	Hand span	Wingspan	40-yard dash	10-yard split	20-yard split	Vertical jump	Broad jump	Bench press
5 ft 11 in (1.80 m)	178 lb (81 kg)	31 in (0.79 m)	9 1/4 in (0.23 m)	6 ft 2 5/8 in (1.90 m)	4.47 s	1.54 s	2.57 s	36.0 in (0.91 m)	10 ft 5 in (3.18 m)	11 reps
All values from the NFL Combine

=== Minnesota Vikings ===
Blackmon was drafted by the Minnesota Vikings in the third round, 102nd overall, of the 2023 NFL draft. In Week 10, Blackmon recorded his first career interception in a 27–19 win against the New Orleans Saints.

On July 24, 2024, it was announced that Blackmon had suffered a torn ACL, ruling him out for the entirety of the ensuing season.

=== Indianapolis Colts ===
On August 25, 2025, the Vikings traded Blackmon to the Indianapolis Colts in exchange for a 2026 NFL draft sixth-round pick. He appeared in all 17 games for Indianapolis (starting 11), in which he recorded two interceptions, seven passes defended, one sack, and 64 combined tackles.

On August 26, 2026, Blackmon was waived by the Colts.

=== Cleveland Browns ===
On August 27, 2026, Blackmon was claimed off waivers by the Cleveland Browns.

== NFL career statistics ==
Legend
**Bold**	Career high

=== Regular season ===
Year	Team	Games		Tackles					Interceptions						Fumbles				
Year	Team	GP	GS	Cmb	Solo	Ast	Sck	TFL	Int	Yds	Avg	Lng	TD	PD	FF	Fum	FR	Yds	TD
2023	MIN	15	3	41	34	7	0.0	**3**	1	0	0.0	0	0	**8**	0	0	**1**	0	0
2025	IND	17	11	**64**	**50**	**14**	**1.0**	2	**2**	**41**	**20.5**	**32**	0	7	0	0	0	0	0
2026	CLE	5	1	11	9	2	0.0	0	0	0	0.0	0	0	2	0	0	0	0	0
Career		37	15	116	93	23	1.0	5	3	41	13.7	32	0	17	0	0	1	0	0
