= Domani Jackson =

American football player (born 2003)

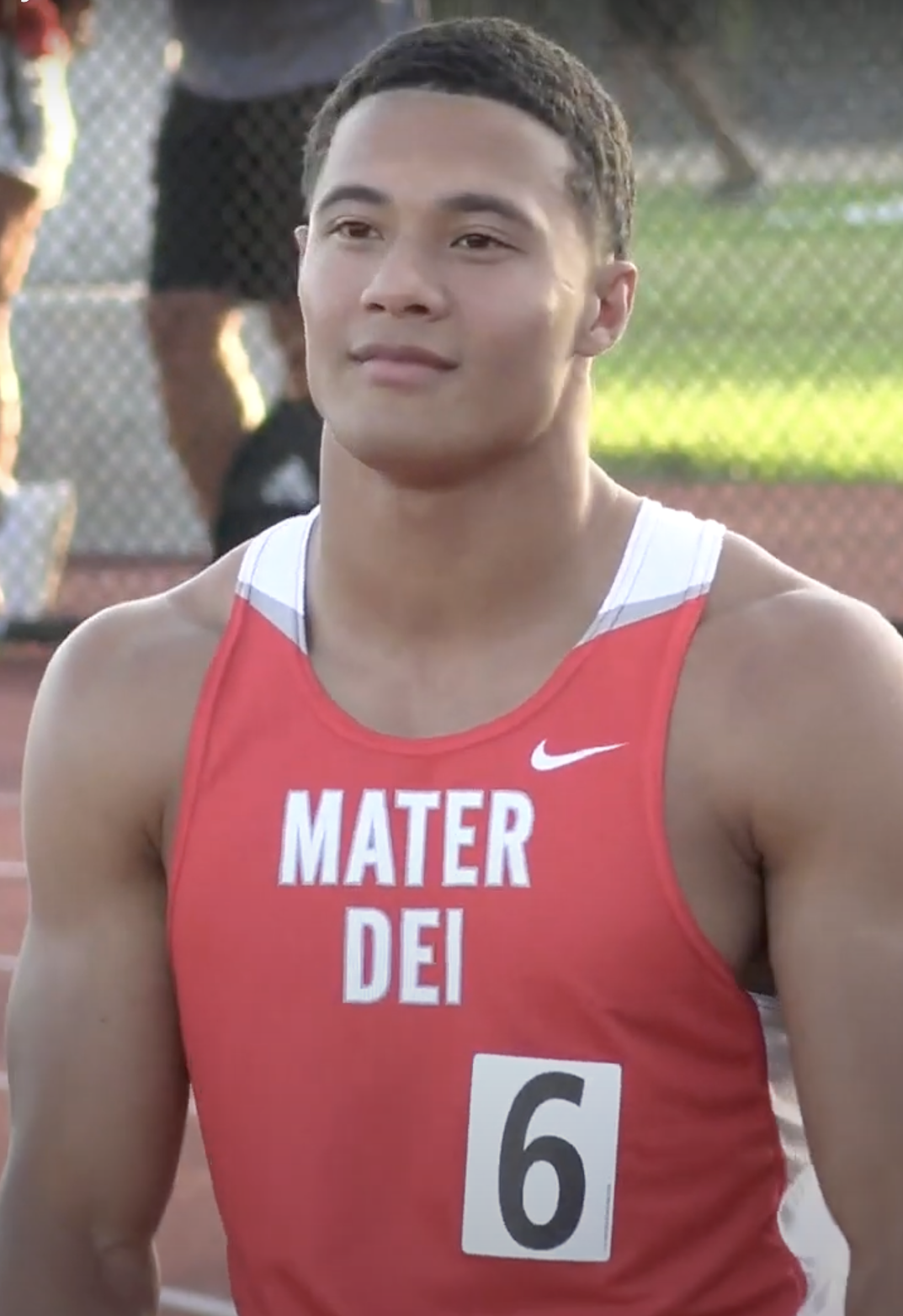
- Jackson in high school in 2021

No. 20 – Green Bay Packers
- Position: Cornerback
- Roster status: Practice squad

Personal information
- Born: November 27, 2002 (age 23); San Diego, California, U.S.
- Listed height: 6 ft 0 in (1.83 m)
- Listed weight: 194 lb (88 kg)

Career information
- High school: Mater Dei (Santa Ana, California)
- College: USC (2022–2023); Alabama (2024–2025)
- NFL draft: 2026: 6th round, 201st overall pick

Career history
- Green Bay Packers (2026–present)*
- * Offseason or practice squad member only
- Stats at Pro Football Reference

Domani Jackson (born November 27, 2002) is an American professional football cornerback for the Green Bay Packers of the National Football League (NFL). He played college football for the USC Trojans and the Alabama Crimson Tide, and was selected by the Packers in the sixth round of the 2026 NFL draft.

== Early life ==
Jackson attended Mater Dei High School in Santa Ana, California. He played football and competed in track for Mater Dei. In 2021, he tied the California state record in the 100 meters with a time of 10.25 seconds. As a senior, he missed most of the football season after suffering a knee injury.

He was ranked by ESPN at No. 9 nationally and No. 1 in California in its ranking of the top college recruits in the Class of 2022. 247Sports rated him as the No. 4 recruit nationally.

== College career ==
After narrowing his final choices to USC, Michigan and Alabama, Jackson committed to USC in December 2021.

On December 18, 2023, Jackson announced that he would be entering the transfer portal. On December 28, 2023, he announced that he would be transferring to Alabama.

== Professional career ==
Pre-draft measurables
Height	Weight	Arm length	Hand span	Wingspan	40-yard dash	10-yard split	20-yard split	Vertical jump
6 ft 0 3/4 in (1.85 m)	194 lb (88 kg)	31 1/8 in (0.79 m)	9 1/8 in (0.23 m)	6 ft 1 3/4 in (1.87 m)	4.41 s	1.58 s	2.59 s	33.5 in (0.85 m)
All values from NFL Combine/Pro Day

Jackson was selected by the Green Bay Packers in the sixth round with the 201st overall pick of the 2026 NFL draft. He was signed on May 1, 2026. On August 30, Jackson was released by the Packers as a part of final roster cuts. A day later, he was re–signed to the Packers' practice squad.
