= Raleek Brown =

American football player (born 2003)

No. 0 – Texas Longhorns
- Position: Running back
- Class: Redshirt Senior

Personal information
- Born: August 2, 2003 (age 23)
- Listed height: 5 ft 9 in (1.75 m)
- Listed weight: 195 lb (88 kg)

Career information
- High school: Mater Dei (Santa Ana, California)
- College: USC (2022–2023); Arizona State (2024–2025); Texas (2026–present)

Awards and highlights
- First-team All-Big 12 (2025)
- Stats at ESPN

Raleek Brown (born August 2, 2003) is an American college football running back for the Texas Longhorns. He previously played for the USC Trojans and Arizona State Sun Devils.

== Early life ==
Brown attended Edison High School in Stockton, California for his first two years Mater Dei High School in Santa Ana, California for his junior and senior years. As a senior, he had 1,123 rushing yards on 143 carries with 15 touchdowns and was named the All-CIF Division 1 Co-Offensive Player of the Year. Overall in his high school career he had 4,174 yards and 54 touchdowns. Rated as a five-star recruit by Rivals.com, Brown originally committed to play college football at the University of Oklahoma but flipped his commitment the University of Southern California (USC) after head coach Lincoln Riley left Oklahoma to coach USC.

== College career ==
=== USC ===
Brown played in all 14 games his true freshman year at USC in 2022, rushing for 227 yards on 42 carries with three touchdowns and 16 receptions for 175 yards. As a sophomore in 2023, he was switched from running back to wide receiver. He played in two games, catching three passes for 16 yards with a touchdown before taking a redshirt. After the season, Brown transferred to Arizona State University.

=== Arizona State ===
In his first season with Arizona State in 2024, he played in two games due to injury and had nine carries for 42 yards. In 2025, Brown took over as the starting running back. Throughout the season, he logged 1,141 rushing yards, 239 receiving yards, four rushing touchdowns, and two receiving touchdowns. At the end of the season, he entered the transfer portal.

=== Texas ===
On January 8, 2026, Brown transferred to the University of Texas at Austin. In Week 1 against Texas State, he ran for 34 yards and two touchdowns, scoring his first touchdown as a Longhorn. In Week 8 against Ole Miss, Brown ran for 157 yards, averaging 6.8 yards per carry, marking the first time a Longhorn has recorded over 100 rushing yards this season.

=== College statistics ===
Year	Team	Games		Rushing				Receiving				Kick returns		
Year	Team	GP	GS	Att	Yards	Avg	TD	Rec	Yards	Avg	TD	Att	Yards	TD
2022	USC	14	0	42	227	5.4	3	16	175	10.9	3	24	517	0
2023	USC	2	0	3	16	5.3	1	3	18	6.0	0	0	0	0
2024	Arizona State	2	0	9	42	4.7	0	3	5	2.0	0	0	0	0
2025	Arizona State	12	10	186	1,141	6.1	4	34	239	7.0	2	2	35	0
2026	Texas	7	1	84	422	5.0	5	10	28	2.8	0	0	0	0
Career		37	11	324	1,848	5.7	13	66	466	7.1	5	26	552	0
