= Brenden Rice =

American football player (born 2002)

Colorado Stampede
- Position: Wide receiver
- Roster status: Unsigned draft pick

Personal information
- Born: March 18, 2002 (age 24); Phoenix, Arizona, U.S.
- Listed height: 6 ft 2 in (1.88 m)
- Listed weight: 208 lb (94 kg)

Career information
- High school: Hamilton (Chandler, Arizona)
- College: Colorado (2020–2021); USC (2022–2023)
- NFL draft: 2024: 7th round, 225th overall pick

Career history
- Los Angeles Chargers (2024); New England Patriots (2025)*; Seattle Seahawks (2025)*; Las Vegas Raiders (2025)*; Green Bay Packers (2026)*; Colorado Stampede (2027-present)
- * Offseason or practice squad member only

Awards and highlights
- Second-team All-Pac-12 (2023)
- Stats at Pro Football Reference

Brenden Khalil Rice (born March 18, 2002) is an American professional football wide receiver. He played college football for the Colorado Buffaloes and USC Trojans before being selected by the Los Angeles Chargers in the seventh round of the 2024 NFL draft. Rice is the son of Hall of Famer Jerry Rice.

== Early life ==
Rice attended Hamilton High School in Chandler, Arizona and played football as a wide receiver. He also played basketball and was a sprinter on the track team. Rice was rated a three-star recruit and committed to the University of Colorado Boulder on October 15, 2019.

== College career ==
In 2020, Rice had 6 receptions for 120 yards and 2 touchdowns for the Colorado Buffaloes. In 2021, he had 21 receptions for 299 yards, along with 17 kickoff returns for 469 yards and 6 carries for 54 yards.

Rice entered the transfer portal on January 1, 2022. He transferred to USC on January 18, 2022.

On December 8, 2023, Rice announced that he would forgo his remaining year of college eligibility and enter the 2024 NFL draft.

=== College statistics ===
| Season | Team | Games | | Receiving | | | | Returning | | | |
| Season | Team | GP | GS | Rec | Yds | Avg | TD | Att | Yds | Avg | TD |
|---|---|---|---|---|---|---|---|---|---|---|---|
| 2020 | Colorado | 6 | 1 | 6 | 120 | 20.0 | 2 | 3 | 118 | 39.3 | 1 |
| 2021 | Colorado | 11 | 11 | 21 | 299 | 14.2 | 3 | 17 | 469 | 27.6 | 0 |
| 2022 | USC | 14 | 12 | 39 | 611 | 15.7 | 4 | 3 | 49 | 16.3 | 0 |
| 2023 | USC | 11 | 11 | 37 | 644 | 17.4 | 11 | 0 | 0 | 0.0 | 0 |
| Career | | 39 | 32 | 103 | 1,674 | 16.3 | 20 | 23 | 636 | 27.7 | 1 |

== Professional career ==
Pre-draft measurables
| Height | Weight | Arm length | Hand span | Wingspan | 40-yard dash | 10-yard split | 20-yard split | 20-yard shuttle | Three-cone drill | Vertical jump | Broad jump | Bench press |
|---|---|---|---|---|---|---|---|---|---|---|---|---|
| 6 ft 2 3/8 in (1.89 m) | 208 lb (94 kg) | 33 in (0.84 m) | 9 5/8 in (0.24 m) | 6 ft 6 in (1.98 m) | 4.50 s | 1.55 s | 2.64 s | 4.32 s | 6.94 s | 36.5 in (0.93 m) | 9 ft 11 in (3.02 m) | 13 reps |
All values from NFL Combine/Pro Day

=== Los Angeles Chargers ===
The Los Angeles Chargers selected Rice in the seventh round, 225th overall, of the 2024 NFL draft. He appeared in three games in his rookie season. On August 26, 2025, Rice was waived as part of final roster cuts.

=== New England Patriots ===
On November 4, 2025, Rice signed with the New England Patriots' practice squad. Rice was released by the Patriots on November 11.

=== Seattle Seahawks ===
On November 18, 2025, Rice signed with the Seattle Seahawks' practice squad. He was released by the Seahawks on December 2.

=== Las Vegas Raiders ===
On December 3, 2025, Rice signed with the Las Vegas Raiders' practice squad. He signed a reserve/future contract with Las Vegas on January 5, 2026. On May 11, Rice was waived by the Raiders.

=== Green Bay Packers ===
On May 13, 2026, Rice was claimed off waivers by the Green Bay Packers. On July 31, he was waived by the Packers with an injury designation.
