= Terrell Bynum (American football) =

American football player (born 1998)

No. 35
- Position: Wide receiver

Personal information
- Born: August 3, 1998 (age 28); Long Beach, California, U.S.
- Listed height: 6 ft 0 in (1.83 m)
- Listed weight: 188 lb (85 kg)

Career information
- High school: St. John Bosco (CA) (2013, 2016); Servite (CA) (2014–2015)
- College: Washington (2017–2021); USC (2022)
- NFL draft: 2023: undrafted

Career history
- Los Angeles Chargers (2023); Indianapolis Colts (2024)*; Las Vegas Raiders (2024)*
- * Offseason or practice squad member only

Career NFL statistics as of 2023
- Games played: 1
- Stats at Pro Football Reference

Terrell Bynum (born August 3, 1998) is an American former professional football wide receiver. He played college football for the Washington Huskies and USC Trojans and was signed by the Los Angeles Chargers as an undrafted free agent in 2023.

== Early life ==
Bynum was born on August 3, 1998, in Long Beach, California. A football and track and field athlete, he attended St. John Bosco High School as a freshman before transferring to Servite High School as a sophomore. He recorded 31 receptions for 391 yards and five touchdowns at Servite his first year there before then having 39 catches for 611 yards and three scores the next season, being named first-team All-Trinity League.

Bynum returned to St. John as a senior and won another first-team All-Trinity League selection, helping the school have a 13–2 record, the southern section title and open division state championship while posting 58 catches for 737 yards and seven scores. Bynum was named a PrepStar All-American, a top-100 western recruit by the Tacoma News-Tribune, played in the Polynesian Bowl and was ranked the 34th-best wide receiver in the nation, as well as the 243rd-best player overall according to Scout.com. A four-star recruit, he committed to play college football for the Washington Huskies over various other offers.

== College career ==
As a true freshman at Washington in 2017, Bynum redshirted, seeing no playing time. The following year, he appeared in 10 games, one as a starter, recording no statistics. After having had a slow start to the 2019 season, he broke out with 31 catches for 368 yards and two touchdowns, mostly near the end of the year. He played three games in the COVID-19-shortened 2020 season, having eight catches for 130 yards. In 2021, Bynum recorded 26 catches for 436 yards and four touchdowns while starting seven games. He led the team in average yards per reception and was named honorable mention All-Pac-12 Conference. Bynum announced his transfer to play his final year of eligibility with the USC Trojans in 2022, ending his Washington career with 65 catches for 934 yards and six scores in 34 games played. At USC, he recorded 16 receptions for 159 yards and one touchdown. He totaled 81 catches for 1,093 yards and seven touchdowns in his collegiate career, additionally carrying the ball seven times for 87 yards.

== Professional career ==
Pre-draft measurables
Height	Weight	Arm length	Hand span	40-yard dash	10-yard split	20-yard split	20-yard shuttle	Three-cone drill	Vertical jump	Broad jump	Bench press
6 ft 0 in (1.83 m)	188 lb (85 kg)	30 7/8 in (0.78 m)	9 3/8 in (0.24 m)	4.58 s	1.63 s	2.71 s	4.19 s	6.95 s	35.0 in (0.89 m)	10 ft 1 in (3.07 m)	15 reps
All values from Pro Day

=== Los Angeles Chargers ===
After going unselected in the 2023 NFL draft, Bynum was signed by the Los Angeles Chargers as an undrafted free agent. He was released at the final roster cuts and subsequently re-signed to the practice squad. He was elevated to the active roster for the team's Week 11 game against the Green Bay Packers and made his debut in the 23–20 loss, appearing on one snap. His contract expired at the end of the season and he did not sign a reserve/future contract, thus becoming a free agent.

=== Indianapolis Colts ===
On January 17, 2024, Bynum signed a reserve/future contract with the Indianapolis Colts. He was waived on May 10.

=== Las Vegas Raiders ===
On July 29, 2024, Bynum signed with the Las Vegas Raiders. He was waived on August 27.
