= 2023 Pac-12 Conference football season =

American college football season

- League: NCAA Division I Football Bowl Subdivision
- Sport: Football
- Duration: August 26, 2023; January 8, 2024
- Teams: 12
- Total attendance: 3,844,171
- TV partner(s): Fox Sports Media Group, (Fox, FS1), ESPN Family, (ABC, ESPN, ESPN2, ESPNU), and Pac-12 Networks

2024 NFL draft
- Top draft pick: Caleb Williams, QB, USC
- Picked by: Chicago Bears, 1st overall

Regular season
- Season champions: Washington
- Top scorer: Tyler Loop, K, Arizona (110 points)

Pac-12 Championship
- Champions: Washington
- Runners-up: Oregon
- Finals MVP: Michael Penix Jr., QB, Washington

Football seasons
- 2022 2024

2023 Pac-12 Conference football standings
| | Conf. | | | Overall |
| Team | W | | L | W | | L |
|---|---|---|---|---|---|---|
| No. 2 Washington y$^ | 9 | – | 0 | 14 | – | 1 |
| No. 6 Oregon y | 8 | – | 1 | 12 | – | 2 |
| No. 11 Arizona | 7 | – | 2 | 10 | – | 3 |
| Oregon State | 5 | – | 4 | 8 | – | 5 |
| Utah | 5 | – | 4 | 8 | – | 5 |
| USC | 5 | – | 4 | 8 | – | 5 |
| California | 4 | – | 5 | 6 | – | 7 |
| UCLA | 4 | – | 5 | 8 | – | 5 |
| Washington State | 2 | – | 7 | 5 | – | 7 |
| Stanford | 2 | – | 7 | 3 | – | 9 |
| Arizona State* | 2 | – | 7 | 3 | – | 9 |
| Colorado | 1 | – | 8 | 4 | – | 8 |
Championship: Washington 34, Oregon 31
^ – College Football Playoff participant; $ – Conference champion; y – Championship game participant; * – Ineligible for postseason play due to self-imposed ban for 2020 recruiting violations; Rankings from AP Poll

The 2023 Pac-12 Conference football season was the 45th season of Pac-12 football taking place during the 2023 NCAA Division I FBS football season. The season began on August 26, 2023, and ended with the 2023 Pac-12 Championship Game on December 1, 2023, at Allegiant Stadium in Paradise, Nevada.

The Pac-12 was a Power Five conference under the College Football Playoff format along with the Atlantic Coast Conference, the Big 12 Conference, Big Ten Conference, and the Southeastern Conference.

The 2023 season was the second since the conference expanded to 12 teams in 2011 in which Pac-12 teams were not split into divisions. It was the final season with Arizona, Arizona State, California, Colorado, Oregon, Stanford, UCLA, USC, Utah, and Washington who all left to join the Big 12 (Arizona, Arizona State, Colorado & Utah), ACC (California and Stanford) and Big Ten (Oregon, UCLA, USC & Washington) following the 2023–24 academic year.

On August 27, Arizona State announced a self-imposed 2023 bowl game ban due to recruiting violations from the 2020 season.

== Preseason ==
2023 Pac-12 Spring Football and number of signees on signing day:

- Arizona – 22
- Arizona State – 17
- California – 10
- Colorado – 18
- Oregon – 27
- Oregon State – 18
- Stanford – 16
- UCLA – 14
- USC – 20
- Utah – 20
- Washington – 20
- Washington State – 22

=== Recruiting classes ===
Rankings
| Team | ESPN | Rivals | 24/7 | On3 Recruits | Signees |
|---|---|---|---|---|---|
| Arizona | 36 | 40 | 39 | 46 | 25 |
| Arizona State | 46 | 52 | 44 | 49 | 20 |
| California | 75 | 94 | 87 | 70 | 12 |
| Colorado | 23 | 30 | 30 | 33 | 19 |
| Oregon | 8 | 9 | 9 | 8 | 29 |
| Oregon State | 58 | 56 | 49 | 49 | 20 |
| Stanford | 39 | 42 | 46 | 42 | 19 |
| UCLA | 31 | 46 | 37 | 32 | 16 |
| USC | 13 | 8 | 8 | 9 | 22 |
| Utah | 20 | 19 | 21 | 21 | 20 |
| Washington | 28 | 24 | 25 | 26 | 21 |
| Washington State | 66 | 61 | 63 | 65 | 25 |

=== Pac-12 Media Days ===
The Pac-12 conducted its 2023 Pac-12 media day on July 21, 2023, at Resorts World Las Vegas in Las Vegas, NV.

The teams, representatives and times(PST) in respective order were as follows:

- Pac-12 Commissioner – George Kliavkoff 8 a.m.
- Executive Associate Commissioner of Football Operations – Merton Hanks 8:20 a.m.
- Utah Athletic Director and Chair of the Pac-12 Athletics Directors Committee – Mark Harlan 8:20 a.m.

Media Day Schedule
| Team | Head coach | Time | Players | Time |
|---|---|---|---|---|
| Utah | Kyle Whittingham | 8:45 a.m. | Cameron Rising (QB), Cole Bishop (S) | 9:10 a.m. |
| USC | Lincoln Riley | 9:20 a.m. | Caleb Williams (QB), Mason Cobb (LB) | 9:45 a.m. |
| Stanford | Troy Taylor | 9:55 a.m. | John Humphreys (WR), Tristan Sinclair (LB) | 10:20 a.m. |
| Arizona | Jedd Fisch | 10:30 a.m. | Jayden De Laura (QB), Treydan Stukes (DB) | 10:55 a.m. |
| Washington State | Jake Dickert | 11:05 a.m. | Cam Ward (QB), Ron Stone Jr. (EDGE) | 11:30 a.m. |
| Oregon State | Jonathan Smith | 11:40 a.m. | Anthony Gould (WR), Kitan Oladapo (DB) | 12:05 p.m. |
| Washington | Kalen DeBoer | 1:00 p.m. | Michael Penix Jr. (QB), Edefuan Ulofoshio (LB) | 1:25 p.m. |
| Oregon | Dan Lanning | 1:35 p.m. | Bo Nix (QB), Jeffrey Bassa (LB) | 2:00 p.m. |
| Arizona State | Kenny Dillingham | 2:10 p.m. | Jalin Conyers (TE), Jordan Clark (DB) | 2:35 p.m. |
| California | Justin Wilcox | 2:45 p.m. | Matthew Cindric (OL), Jackson Sirmon (LB) | 3:10 p.m. |
| Colorado | Charles Kelly † | 3:20 p.m. | Shedeur Sanders (QB), Travis Hunter (DB) | 3:45 p.m. |
| UCLA | Chip Kelly | 3:55 p.m. | Duke Clemens (OL), Laiatu Latu (DE) | 4:20 p.m. |

Notes:

† Coach Deion Sanders was not in attendance due to a medical issue, Colorado Defensive Coordinator Charles Kelly attended instead.

==== Preseason Media polls ====
The preseason polls was released on July 20, 2023. Since 1992, the credentialed media has gotten the preseason champion correct just five times. Only nine times has the preseason pick even made it to the Pac-12 title game. Below are the results of the media poll with total points received next to each school and first-place votes in parentheses.

| Predicted finish | Team | Votes (1st place) |
|---|---|---|
| 1 | USC | 413 (25) |
| 2 | Washington | 367 (4) |
| 3 | Utah | 359 (6) |
| 4 | Oregon | 344 (1) |
| 5 | Oregon State | 309 |
| 6 | UCLA | 248 |
| 7 | Washington State | 186 |
| 8 | Arizona | 176 |
| 9 | California | 132 |
| 10 | Arizona State | 122 |
| 11 | Colorado | 98 |
| 12 | Stanford | 54 |

=== Preseason awards ===
==== All−American Teams ====
| | School | Position | AP 1st Team | AP 2nd Team | AS 1st Team | AS 2nd Team | AS 3rd Team | AS 4th Team | WCFF 1st Team | WCFF 2nd Team | ESPN | CBS 1st Team | CBS 2nd Team | CFN 1st Team | CFN 2nd Team | PFF 1st Team | PFF 2nd Team | PFF 3rdTeam | SN 1st Team | SN 2nd Team |
| Cole Bishop | Utah | S | | | | ✓ | | | | ✓ | | | ✓ | | | | | | | |
| Brant Kuithe | Utah | TE | | | | ✓ | | | | | | | | | | | | | | |
| Junior Tafuna | Utah | DL | | | | | ✓ | | | | | | | | | | | | | |
| Jonah Monheim | USC | OL | | | | | | | | | | | | | | | | ✓ | | |
| Justin Dedich | USC | OL | | | | | | | | | | | | | | | | ✓ | | |
| Calen Bullock | USC | S | | ✓ | | | | ✓ | | | | ✓ | | | | ✓ | | | ✓ | |
| Caleb Williams | USC | QB | ✓ | | ✓ | | | | ✓ | | ✓ | ✓ | | ✓ | | ✓ | | | ✓ | |
| Dorian Singer | USC | WR | | | | ✓ | | | | | | | | | | | | ✓ | | ✓ |
| Jacob Cowing | Arizona | WR | | ✓ | | | ✓ | | | | | | | | | | | | | |
| Brandon Dorlus | Oregon | DE | | | | | | ✓ | | | | | | | | | | | | |
| Bucky Irving | Oregon | RB | | | | | | | ✓ | | | | | | | | ✓ | | | |
| Taliese Fuaga | Oregon State | OL | | | | | ✓ | | | | | | | | | | | | | |
| Anthony Gould | Oregon State | PR | | | | ✓ | | | | | | | ✓ | | | | | | ✓ | |
| Jake Levengood | Oregon State | C | | | | | | ✓ | | | | | | | | | | | | |
| Travis Hunter | Colorado | DB | ✓ | | ✓ | | | | | | | ✓ | | | | | | | | ✓ |
| Joshua Karty | Stanford | K | ✓ | | ✓ | | | | ✓ | | ✓ | ✓ | | | | ✓ | | | ✓ | |
| Laiatu Latu | UCLA | DE | | | | ✓ | | | | | | | | | | | | | | ✓ |
| Jalen McMillan | Washington | WR | | | | ✓ | | | | | | | | | | | ✓ | | | |
| Rome Odunze | Washington | WR | ✓ | | ✓ | | | | ✓ | | ✓ | ✓ | | | ✓ | ✓ | | | ✓ | |
| Michael Penix Jr. | Washington | QB | | | | | ✓ | | | | | | | | ✓ | | | | | |
| Troy Fautanu | Washington | OL | | | | | | ✓ | | | | | | | | | | | | |
| Bralen Trice | Washington | DL | ✓ | | ✓ | | | | ✓ | | | | ✓ | | | ✓ | | | | ✓ |
| Jackson Sirmon | California | LB | | | | | | ✓ | | | | | | | | | | | | |

==== Individual awards ====
| Award | Head Coach/Player | School | Position | Year | Ref |
|---|---|---|---|---|---|
| Lott Trophy | Travis Hunter | Colorado | DB | So. | |
| Lott Trophy | Calen Bullock | USC | DB | Jr. | |
| Lott Trophy | Mason Cobb | USC | LB | Sr. | |
| Lott Trophy | Justin Flowe | Arizona | LB | Jr. | |
| Lott Trophy | Karene Reid | Utah | LB | Jr. | |
| Lott Trophy | Bralen Trice | Washington | DL | Jr. | |
| Lott Trophy | Jordan Burch | Oregon | DL | Jr. | |
| Lott Trophy | Laiatu Latu | UCLA | DL | (redshirt) Jr. | |
| Dodd Trophy | Kyle Whittingham | Utah | Head coach | — | |
| Maxwell Award | Cam Rising | Utah | QB | Sr. | |
| Maxwell Award | Bo Nix | Oregon | QB | Sr. | |
| Maxwell Award | Shedeur Sanders | Colorado | QB | Jr. | |
| Maxwell Award | Jayden de Laura | Arizona | QB | Jr. | |
| Maxwell Award | Jacob Cowing | Arizona | WR | Sr. | |
| Maxwell Award | Jaydn Ott | California | RB | So. | |
| Maxwell Award | Damien Martinez | Oregon State | RB | So. | |
| Maxwell Award | Caleb Williams | USC | QB | Jr. | |
| Maxwell Award | Cam Ward | Washington State | QB | Jr. | |
| Maxwell Award | Michael Penix Jr. | Washington | QB | Sr. | |
| Maxwell Award | Rome Odunze | Washington | WR | Jr. | |
| Davey O'Brien Award | Michael Penix Jr. | Washington | QB | Sr. | |
| Davey O'Brien Award | Caleb Williams | USC | QB | Jr. | |
| Davey O'Brien Award | Cameron Rising | Utah | QB | Sr. | |
| Davey O'Brien Award | Bo Nix | Oregon | QB | Sr. | |
| Doak Walker Award | Bucky Irving | Oregon | RB | Jr. | |
| Doak Walker Award | Noah Whittington | Oregon | RB | Jr. | |
| Doak Walker Award | Austin Jones | USC | RB | Sr. | |
| Doak Walker Award | E. J. Smith | Stanford | RB | Sr. | |
| Doak Walker Award | Damien Martinez | Oregon State | RB | So. | |
| Doak Walker Award | Jaydn Ott | California | RB | So. | |
| Doak Walker Award | Alton McCaskill | Colorado | RB | So. | |
| Doak Walker Award | Sy'veon Wilkerson | Colorado | RB | So. | |
| Doak Walker Award | Kavosiey Smoke | Colorado | RB | GS | |
| Doak Walker Award | Nakia Watson | Washington State | RB | Sr. | |
| Doak Walker Award | Michael Wiley | Arizona | RB | Sr. | |
| Doak Walker Award | Carson Steele | UCLA | RB | Jr. | |
| Doak Walker Award | Cam Skattebo | Arizona State | RB | Jr. | |
| Biletnikoff Award | Elijhah Badger | Arizona State | WR | (redshirt) Jr. | |
| Biletnikoff Award | Jacob Cowing | Arizona | WR | Sr. | |
| Biletnikoff Award | Troy Franklin | Oregon | WR | So. | |
| Biletnikoff Award | Tez Johnson | Oregon | WR | Jr. | |
| Biletnikoff Award | Jeremiah Hunter | California | WR | (redshirt) Jr. | |
| Biletnikoff Award | Rome Odunze | Washington | WR | Jr. | |
| Biletnikoff Award | Dorian Singer | USC | WR | Jr. | |
| Biletnikoff Award | Tahj Washington | USC | WR | (redshirt) Sr. | |
| Biletnikoff Award | J. Michael Sturdivant | UCLA | WR | (redshirt) So. | |
| John Mackey Award | Carsen Ryan | UCLA | TE | So. | |
| John Mackey Award | Terrance Ferguson | Oregon | TE | So. | |
| John Mackey Award | Jalin Conyers | Arizona State | TE | (redshirt) Jr. | |
| John Mackey Award | Benjamin Yurosek | Stanford | TE | Sr. | |
| John Mackey Award | Brant Kuithe | Utah | TE | (redshirt) Sr. | |
| John Mackey Award | Thomas Yassmin | Utah | TE | Sr. | |
| John Mackey Award | Devin Culp | Washington | TE | Sr. | |
| Rimington Trophy | Matteo Mele | Washington | OL | Sr. | |
| Rimington Trophy | Matthew Cindric | California | OL | (redshirt) Sr. | |
| Rimington Trophy | Jackson Powers-Johnson | Oregon | OL | Jr. | |
| Rimington Trophy | Jake Levengood | Oregon State | OL | Jr. | |
| Rimington Trophy | Duke Clemens | UCLA | OL | (redshirt) Sr. | |
| Rimington Trophy | Justin Dedich | USC | OL | (redshirt) Sr. | |
| Butkus Award | Mason Cobb | USC | LB | Sr. | |
| Butkus Award | Justin Flowe | Arizona | LB | Jr. | |
| Butkus Award | Jestin Jacobs | Oregon | LB | So. | |
| Butkus Award | Darius Muasau | UCLA | LB | (redshirt) Sr. | |
| Butkus Award | Jackson Sirmon | California | LB | (redshirt) Sr. | |
| Butkus Award | Karene Reid | Utah | LB | Jr. | |
| Jim Thorpe Award | Cole Bishop | Utah | DB | Jr. | |
| Jim Thorpe Award | Calen Bullock | USC | DB | Jr. | |
| Bronko Nagurski Trophy | Cole Bishop | Utah | DB | Jr. | |
| Bronko Nagurski Trophy | Calen Bullock | USC | DB | Jr. | |
| Bronko Nagurski Trophy | Brandon Dorlus | Oregon | DL | Sr. | |
| Bronko Nagurski Trophy | Laiatu Latu | UCLA | DL | Sr. | |
| Bronko Nagurski Trophy | Brennan Jackson | Washington State | DL | (redshirt) Jr. | |
| Bronko Nagurski Trophy | Kitan Oladapo | Oregon State | DL | (redshirt) Jr. | |
| Bronko Nagurski Trophy | Jackson Sirmon | California | LB | (redshirt) Sr. | |
| Bronko Nagurski Trophy | Bralen Trice | Washington | DL | Jr. | |
| Bronko Nagurski Trophy | Junior Tafuna | Utah | DL | Jr. | |
| Outland Trophy | Keaton Bills | Utah | OL | Jr. | |
| Outland Trophy | Jarrett Kingston | USC | OL | (redshirt) Sr. | |
| Outland Trophy | Justin Dedich | USC | OL | (redshirt) Sr. | |
| Outland Trophy | Duke Clemens | UCLA | OL | (redshirt) Sr. | |
| Outland Trophy | Josh Conerly Jr. | Oregon | OL | So. | |
| Outland Trophy | Taliese Fuaga | Oregon State | OL | So. | |
| Outland Trophy | Joshua Gray | Oregon State | OL | (redshirt) So. | |
| Outland Trophy | Troy Fautanu | Washington | OL | Jr. | |
| Outland Trophy | Junior Tafuna | Utah | DL | Jr. | |
| Outland Trophy | Sataoa Laumea | Utah | OL | Jr. | |
| Outland Trophy | Jordan Morgan | Arizona | OL | Sr. | |
| Outland Trophy | Jonah Savaiinaea | Arizona | OL | So. | |
| Lou Groza Award | Tyler Loop | Arizona | PK | Jr. | |
| Lou Groza Award | Joshua Karty | Stanford | PK | Sr. | |
| Ray Guy Award | Eddie Czaplicki | USC | P | Jr. | |
| Ray Guy Award | Lachlan Wilson | California | P | (redshirt) Jr. | |
| Ray Guy Award | Mark Vassett | Colorado | P | Jr. | |
| Ray Guy Award | Nick Haberer | Washington State | P | Jr. | |
| Ray Guy Award | Kyle Ostendorp | Arizona | P | Sr. | |
| Paul Hornung Award | Jacob Cowing | Arizona | WR | Sr. | |
| Paul Hornung Award | Anthony Gould | Oregon State | WR | (redshirt) Jr. | |
| Paul Hornung Award | Travis Hunter | Colorado | WR | So. | |
| Paul Hornung Award | Kris Hutson | Oregon | WR | Jr. | |
| Paul Hornung Award | Cameron Skattebo | Arizona State | WR | Sr. | |
| Paul Hornung Award | Tahj Washington | USC | WR | (redshirt) Sr. | |
| Paul Hornung Award | Brant Kuithe | Utah | TE | (redshirt) Sr. | |
| Wuerffel Trophy | Akili Arnold | Oregon State | DB | Jr. | |
| Wuerffel Trophy | Trikweze Bridges | Oregon | DB | Jr. | |
| Wuerffel Trophy | Chase Griffin | UCLA | QB | Sr. | |
| Wuerffel Trophy | Dean Janikowski | Washington State | PK | Jr. | |
| Wuerffel Trophy | Edefuan Ulofoshio | Washington | LB | Sr. | |
| Wuerffel Trophy | Joshka Gustav | Colorado | LB | Sr. | |
| Wuerffel Trophy | Traivion Brown | Arizona State | LB | Sr. | |
| Wuerffel Trophy | John Humphreys | Stanford | WR | Sr. | |
| Wuerffel Trophy | Justin Dedich | USC | OL | Sr. | |
| Wuerffel Trophy | Jordan Morgan | Arizona | OL | Sr. | |
| Wuerffel Trophy | Matthew Cindric | California | OL | (redshirt) Sr. | |

| Award | Head Coach/Player | School | Position | Year | Ref |
|---|---|---|---|---|---|
| Walter Camp Award | Bucky Irving | Oregon | RB | Jr. | |
| Walter Camp Award | Bo Nix | Oregon | QB | Sr. | |
| Walter Camp Award | Rome Odunze | Washington | WR | Jr. | |
| Walter Camp Award | Michael Penix Jr. | Washington | QB | Sr. | |
| Walter Camp Award | Caleb Williams | USC | QB | Jr. | |
| Walter Camp Award | Jaydn Ott | California | RB | So. | |
| Bednarik Award | Jackson Sirmon | California | LB | Sr. | |
| Bednarik Award | Brandon Dorlus | Oregon | DL | Sr. | |
| Bednarik Award | Kitan Oladapo | Oregon State | DB | Sr. | |
| Bednarik Award | Laiatu Latu | UCLA | LB | Sr. | |
| Bednarik Award | David Bailey | Stanford | LB | So. | |
| Bednarik Award | Calen Bullock | USC | DB | Jr. | |
| Bednarik Award | Bralen Trice | Washington | DL | Jr. | |
| Rotary Lombardi Award | Jordan Morgan | Arizona | OL | Sr. | |
| Rotary Lombardi Award | Jackson Sirmon | California | LB | Sr. | |
| Rotary Lombardi Award | Brandon Dorlus | Oregon | DL | Sr. | |
| Rotary Lombardi Award | Taliese Fuaga | Oregon State | OL | Jr. | |
| Rotary Lombardi Award | Gabriel Murphy | UCLA | DL | RSJr. | |
| Rotary Lombardi Award | Laiatu Latu | UCLA | DL | Sr. | |
| Rotary Lombardi Award | Jonah Monheim | USC | DL | RSJr. | |
| Rotary Lombardi Award | Justin Dedich | USC | OL | RSSr. | |
| Rotary Lombardi Award | Junior Tafuna | Utah | DL | Jr. | |
| Rotary Lombardi Award | Troy Fautanu | Washington | OL | Jr. | |
| Rotary Lombardi Award | Bralen Trice | Washington | DL | Sr. | |
| Patrick Mannelly Award | Slater Zellers | Arizona State | LS | GS | |
| Patrick Mannelly Award | Bailey Parsons | Stanford | LS | Sr. | |
| Patrick Mannelly Award | Simon Samarzich | Washington | LS | Sr. | |
| Earl Campbell Tyler Rose Award | Ja'Lynn Polk | Washington | WR | So. | |
| Earl Campbell Tyler Rose Award | Kam Brown | UCLA | WR | Sr. | |
| Earl Campbell Tyler Rose Award | Jalin Conyers | Arizona State | TE | Sr. | |
| Earl Campbell Tyler Rose Award | Brant Kuithe | Utah | TE | (redshirt) Sr. | |
| Earl Campbell Tyler Rose Award | Alton McCaskill | Colorado | RB | So. | |
| Earl Campbell Tyler Rose Award | Shedeur Sanders | Colorado | QB | Jr. | |
| Earl Campbell Tyler Rose Award | Matthew Wykoff | California | OL | Jr. | |
| Earl Campbell Tyler Rose Award | Cameron Ward | Washington State | QB | Sr. | |
| Earl Campbell Tyler Rose Award | Nakia Watson | Washington State | RB | Sr. | |
| Earl Campbell Tyler Rose Award | E. J. Smith | Stanford | RB | Sr. | |
| Earl Campbell Tyler Rose Award | Michael Wiley | Arizona | RB | Sr. | |
| Polynesian College Football Player Of The Year Award | Sio Nofoagatoto’a | Arizona | DL | Sr. | |
| Polynesian College Football Player Of The Year Award | Tiaoalii Savea | Arizona | DL | Jr. | |
| Polynesian College Football Player Of The Year Award | Jacob Manu | Arizona | LB | So. | |
| Polynesian College Football Player Of The Year Award | Tetairoa McMillan | Arizona | WR | So. | |
| Polynesian College Football Player Of The Year Award | Jonah Savaiinaea | Arizona | OL | So. | |
| Polynesian College Football Player Of The Year Award | Leif Fautanu | Arizona State | OL | (redshirt) Jr. | |
| Polynesian College Football Player Of The Year Award | Sione Finau | Arizona State | OL | (redshirt) Sr. | |
| Polynesian College Football Player Of The Year Award | Sioape Vatikani | California | OL | So. | |
| Polynesian College Football Player Of The Year Award | Muelu Iosefa | California | LB | Jr. | |
| Polynesian College Football Player Of The Year Award | Jaydn Ott | California | RB | So. | |
| Polynesian College Football Player Of The Year Award | Popo Aumavae | Oregon | DL | Sr. | |
| Polynesian College Football Player Of The Year Award | Taki Taimani | Oregon | DL | Sr. | |
| Polynesian College Football Player Of The Year Award | Mase Funa | Oregon | LB | Sr. | |
| Polynesian College Football Player Of The Year Award | Taliese Fuaga | Oregon State | OL | So. | |
| Polynesian College Football Player Of The Year Award | Sione Lolohea | Oregon State | DL | Jr. | |
| Polynesian College Football Player Of The Year Award | D. J. Uiagalelei | Oregon State | QB | Jr. | |
| Polynesian College Football Player Of The Year Award | Ari Patu | Stanford | QB | Jr. | |
| Polynesian College Football Player Of The Year Award | Alaka'i Gilman | Stanford | DB | Sr. | |
| Polynesian College Football Player Of The Year Award | Jaxson Moi | Stanford | DL | So. | |
| Polynesian College Football Player Of The Year Award | Darius Muasau | UCLA | LB | (redshirt) Sr. | |
| Polynesian College Football Player Of The Year Award | Duke Clemens | UCLA | OL | (redshirt) Sr. | |
| Polynesian College Football Player Of The Year Award | Siale Taupki | UCLA | OL | Sr. | |
| Polynesian College Football Player Of The Year Award | Laiatu Latu | UCLA | DL | Sr. | |
| Polynesian College Football Player Of The Year Award | Jay Toia | UCLA | DL | Jr. | |
| Polynesian College Football Player Of The Year Award | Stanley Ta'ufo'ou | USC | DL | (redshirt) Sr. | |
| Polynesian College Football Player Of The Year Award | Tyrone Taleni | USC | DL | (redshirt) Sr. | |
| Polynesian College Football Player Of The Year Award | Devaughn Vele | Utah | WR | Jr. | |
| Polynesian College Football Player Of The Year Award | Levani Damuni | Utah | LB | Jr. | |
| Polynesian College Football Player Of The Year Award | Falcon Kaumatule | Utah | OL | Jr. | |
| Polynesian College Football Player Of The Year Award | Sataoa Laumea | Utah | OL | Jr. | |
| Polynesian College Football Player Of The Year Award | Junior Tafuna | Utah | DL | Jr. | |
| Polynesian College Football Player Of The Year Award | Simote Pepa | Utah | DL | So. | |
| Polynesian College Football Player Of The Year Award | Sione Vaki | Utah | DB | So. | |
| Polynesian College Football Player Of The Year Award | Troy Fautanu | Washington | OL | Jr. | |
| Polynesian College Football Player Of The Year Award | Alphonzo Tuputala | Washington | LB | Jr. | |
| Polynesian College Football Player Of The Year Award | Tuli Letuligasenoa | Washington | DL | Sr. | |
| Polynesian College Football Player Of The Year Award | Zion Tupuola-Fetui | Washington | DL | Sr. | |
| Polynesian College Football Player Of The Year Award | Fa'alili Fa'amoe | Washington State | OL | (redshirt) So. | |
| Polynesian College Football Player Of The Year Award | Ma'ake Fifita | Washington State | OL | (redshirt) Jr. | |
| Polynesian College Football Player Of The Year Award | Esa Pole | Washington State | OL | Jr. | |
| Manning Award | Jayden de Laura | Arizona | QB | Jr. | |
| Manning Award | Cameron Rising | Utah | QB | Jr. | |
| Manning Award | Caleb Williams | USC | QB | Jr. | |
| Manning Award | Bo Nix | Oregon | QB | Sr. | |
| Manning Award | Michael Penix Jr. | Washington | QB | Sr. | |
| Manning Award | Cameron Ward | Washington State | QB | Sr. | |
| Johnny Unitas Golden Arm Award | Drew Pyne | Arizona State | QB | So. | |
| Johnny Unitas Golden Arm Award | D. J. Uiagalelei | Oregon State | QB | Jr. | |
| Johnny Unitas Golden Arm Award | Cameron Rising | Utah | QB | Jr. | |
| Johnny Unitas Golden Arm Award | Caleb Williams | USC | QB | Jr. | |
| Johnny Unitas Golden Arm Award | Bo Nix | Oregon | QB | Sr. | |
| Johnny Unitas Golden Arm Award | Michael Penix Jr. | Washington | QB | Sr. | |
| Johnny Unitas Golden Arm Award | Cameron Ward | Washington State | QB | Sr. | |

==== Preseason All Pac-12 ====
First Team

| Position | Player | Class | Team |
|---|---|---|---|
First Team Offense
| QB | Caleb Williams | Jr. | USC |
| RB | Damien Martinez | So. | Oregon State |
| RB | Bucky Irving | Jr. | Oregon |
| WR | Rome Odunze | Jr. | Washington |
| WR | Dorian Singer | Jr. | USC |
| TE | Brant Kuithe | Sr. | Utah |
| OL | Keaton Bills | Jr. | Utah |
| OL | Sataoa Laumea | Jr. | Utah |
| OL | Joshua Gray | (redshirt) So. | Oregon State |
| OL | Taliese Fuaga | So. | Oregon State |
| OL | Troy Fautanu | Jr. | Washington |
First Team Defense
| DL | Bralen Trice | Jr. | Washington |
| DL | Laiatu Latu | (redshirt) Jr. | UCLA |
| DL | Brandon Dorlus | Sr. | Oregon |
| DL | Junior Tafuna | Jr. | Utah |
| LB | Karene Reid | Jr. | Utah |
| LB | Jackson Sirmon | (redshirt) Sr. | California |
| LB | Darius Muasau | Sr. | UCLA |
| DB | Cole Bishop | Jr. | Utah |
| DB | Calen Bullock | Jr. | USC |
| DB | Kitan Oladapo | (redshirt) Jr. | Oregon State |
| DB | Travis Hunter | So. | Colorado |
First Team special teams
| PK | Joshua Karty | Sr. | Stanford |
| P | Eddie Czaplicki | Jr. | USC |
| AP | Raleek Brown | So. | USC |
| AP | Travis Hunter | So. | Colorado |
| RS | Anthony Gould | (redshirt) So. | Oregon State |

Second Team

| Position | Player | Class | Team |
|---|---|---|---|
Second Team Offense
| QB | Michael Penix Jr. | GS | Washington |
| RB | Jaydn Ott | So. | California |
| RB | Carson Steele | Jr. | UCLA |
| WR | Jalen McMillan | Jr. | Washington |
| WR | Jacob Cowing | Sr. | Arizona |
| TE | Benjamin Yurosek | Sr. | Stanford |
| OL | Jake Levengood | (redshirt) Jr. | Oregon State |
| OL | Jonah Monheim | (redshirt) Jr. | USC |
| OL | Jarrett Kingston | (redshirt) Jr. | USC |
| OL | Justin Dedich | (redshirt) Sr. | USC |
| OL | Jordan Morgan | Sr. | Arizona |
Second Team Defense
| DL | Brennan Jackson | (redshirt) Sr. | Washington State |
| DL | Ron Stone Jr. | (redshirt) Sr. | Washington State |
| DL | Zion Tupuola-Fetui | (redshirt) Sr. | Washington |
| DL | Van Fillinger | Jr. | Utah |
| LB | Lander Barton | So. | Utah |
| LB | Mason Cobb | So. | USC |
| LB | Eric Gentry | Jr. | USC |
| DB | Chau Smith-Wade | Jr. | Washington State |
| DB | Jabbar Muhammad | Jr. | Washington |
| DB | Craig Woodson | (redshirt) Jr. | California |
| DB | Evan Williams | Sr. | Oregon |
Second Team special teams
| PK | Camden Lewis | Sr. | Oregon |
| P | Nick Haberer | Jr. | Washington State |
| AP | Jacob Cowing | Sr. | Arizona |
| RS | Silas Bolden | So. | Oregon State |

All Pac–12 Honorable Mention (received votes from four or more members of the media):

- Arizona: Justin Flowe (LB), Tyler Loop (PK), Tetairoa McMillan (WR), Kyle Ostendorp (P) Jonah Savaiinaea (OL), Michael Wiley (RB)
- Arizona State: Jalin Conyers (TE), Cameron Skattebo (RB), Ro Torrence (DB), Slater Zellers (AP)
- California: Matthew Cindric (OL), Jeremiah Earby (DB), Jeremiah Hunter (WR), Brett Johnson (DL), Patrick McMorris (DB), Sioape Vatikani (OL), Lachlan Wilson (P)
- Colorado: Jimmy Horn Jr. (RS), Travis Hunter (WR), Mark Vassett (P)
- Oregon: Jeffrey Bassa (LB), Trikweze Bridges (DB), Jordan Burch (DL), Josh Conerly Jr. (OL), Ajani Cornelius (OL), Terrance Ferguson (TE), Troy Franklin (WR), Jackson Powers-Johnson (OL), Bo Nix (QB), Nikko Reed (DB)
- Oregon State: Easton Mascarenas-Arnold (LB), Heneli Bloomfield (OL), Ryan Cooper (DB), Jesiah Irish (AP), James Rawls (DL)
- Stanford: David Bailey (LB)
- UCLA: Duke Clemens (OL), Garrett DiGiorgio (OL)
- USC: Bear Alexander (DL), Kyon Barrs (DL), Raleek Brown (RS), Austin Jones (RB), Shane Lee (LB), Christian Roland-Wallace (DB)
- Utah: JaTravis Broughton (DB), Jonah Elliss (DL), Michael Mokofisi (OL), Zemaiah Vaughn (DB)
- Washington: Jaden Green (AP), Roger Rosengarten (OL), Alphonzo Tuputala (LB), Asa Turner (DB), Edefuan Ulofoshio (LB)
- Washington State: Jaden Hicks (DB), Dean Janikowski (PK), Nakia Watson (RB)

== Head coaches ==
=== Coaching changes ===
There was three coaching changes before the 2023 season. On November 27, 2022, Arizona State hired Kenny Dillingham as the 26th head coach in team history. On December 3, 2022, Colorado hired Deion Sanders as the 28th head coach in team history On December 11, 2022, Stanford hired Troy Taylor as the 35th head coach in program history. On November 25, following a loss to in-state rival Oregon and before their bowl game appearance, Johnathan Smith accepted the head coaching position at Michigan State, he finished his career at Oregon State with a record of 34–35.

=== Coaches ===
Note: All stats current through the completion of the 2023 season

| Team | Head coach | Years at school | Overall record | Record at school | Pac–12 record | Conference Championships |
|---|---|---|---|---|---|---|
| Arizona | Jedd Fisch | 3 | 7–19 | 6–18 | 4–14 | 0 |
| Arizona State | Kenny Dillingham | 1 | 0–0 | 0–0 | 0–0 | 0 |
| California | Justin Wilcox | 7 | 30–36 | 30–36 | 17–32 | 0 |
| Colorado | Deion Sanders | 1 | 27–6 | 0–0 | 0–0 | 0 |
| Oregon | Dan Lanning | 2 | 10–3 | 10–3 | 7–2 | 0 |
| Oregon State | Trent Bray† | 1 | 0–0 | 0–0 | 0–0 | 0 |
| Stanford | Troy Taylor | 1 | 30–8 | 0–0 | 0–0 | 0 |
| UCLA | Chip Kelly | 6 | 73–36 | 27–29 | 22–21 | 3 |
| USC | Lincoln Riley | 2 | 66–13 | 11–3 | 8–1 | 0 |
| Utah | Kyle Whittingham | 19 | 154–74 | 154–74 | 95–57 | 2 |
| Washington | Kalen DeBoer | 2 | 90–11 | 11–2 | 7–2 | 0 |
| Washington State | Jake Dickert | 3 | 10–9 | 10–9 | 7–6 | 0 |

Note:

- † Jonathan Smith coached the first twelve games as head coach at Oregon State in 2023, going 8–4. He finished his career at Oregon State with a 34–35 record.

== Rankings ==
| | | Pre | Wk 1 | Wk 2 | Wk 3 | Wk 4 | Wk 5 | Wk 6 | Wk 7 | Wk 8 | Wk 9 | Wk 10 | Wk 11 | Wk 12 | Wk 13 | Wk 14 | Final |
|---|---|---|---|---|---|---|---|---|---|---|---|---|---|---|---|---|---|
| Arizona | AP | | | | | | | | | | RV | 23 | 19 | 16 | 14 | 14 | 11 |
| Arizona | C | RV | RV | | | | | | RV | RV | RV | 24 | 22 | 16 | 15 | 14 | 11 |
| Arizona | CFP | Not released | | | | | | | | | | 21 | 17 | 15 | 15 | 14 | |
| Arizona State | AP | | | | | | | | | | | | | | | | |
| Arizona State | C | | | | | | | | | | | | | | | | |
| Arizona State | CFP | Not released | | | | | | | | | | | | | | | |
| California | AP | | | | | | | | | | | | | | | | |
| California | C | | | | | | | | | | | | | | | | |
| California | CFP | Not released | | | | | | | | | | | | | | | |
| Colorado | AP | | 22 | 18 | 19 | RV | RV | | | | | | | | | | |
| Colorado | C | | 25 | 21 | 19 | RV | | | | | | | | | | | |
| Colorado | CFP | Not released | | | | | | | | | | | | | | | |
| Oregon | AP | 15 | 13 | 13 | 10 | 9 | 8 | 8 | 9 | 8 | 6 | 6 | 6 | 6 | 5 | 8 | 6т |
| Oregon | C | 15 | 13 | 13 | 11 | 9 | 9 | 8 | 11 | 9 | 7 | 6 | 6 | 6 | 5 | 8 | 7 |
| Oregon | CFP | Not released | | | | | | | | | 6 | 6 | 6 | 6 | 5 | 8 | |
| Oregon State | AP | 18 | 16 | 16 | 14 | 19 | 15 | 15 | 12 | 11 | 16 | 12 | 10 | 15 | 21т | 21 | RV |
| Oregon State | C | 18 | 18 | 17 | 15 | 21 | 16 | 14 | 13 | 12 | 19 | 13 | 10 | 15 | 21 | 22 | RV |
| Oregon State | CFP | Not released | | | | | | | | | 16 | 12 | 11 | 16 | 20 | 19 | |
| Stanford | AP | | | | | | | | | | | | | | | | |
| Stanford | C | | | | | | | | | | | | | | | | |
| Stanford | CFP | Not released | | | | | | | | | | | | | | | |
| UCLA | AP | RV | RV | 24 | 22 | RV | RV | 18 | 25 | 24 | 20 | RV | | RV | | | RV |
| UCLA | C | RV | RV | 25 | 25 | RV | RV | 22 | 25 | 24 | 20 | RV | | RV | | | |
| UCLA | CFP | Not released | | | | | | | | | 19 | | | | | | |
| USC | AP | 6 | 6 | 5 | 5 | 8 | 9 | 10 | 18 | 24 | 24 | RV | RV | | | | RV |
| USC | C | 6 | 6 | 5 | 5 | 6 | 7 | 9 | 16 | 22 | 22 | RV | RV | | | | RV |
| USC | CFP | Not released | | | | | | | | | 20 | | | | | | |
| Utah | AP | 14 | 12 | 12 | 11 | 10 | 18 | 16 | 14 | 13 | 18 | 13 | 16 | RV | RV | RV | RV |
| Utah | C | 14 | 12 | 12 | 10 | 10 | 19 | 16 | 14 | 13 | 18 | 14 | 16 | RV | RV | RV | |
| Utah | CFP | Not released | | | | | | | | | 18 | 18 | 22 | | | | |
| Washington | AP | 10 | 8 | 8 | 8 | 7 | 7 | 7 | 5 | 5 | 5 | 5 | 5 | 4 | 3 | 2 | 2 |
| Washington | C | 11 | 8 | 8 | 8 | 8 | 8 | 6 | 5 | 5 | 5 | 5 | 5 | 5 | 3 | 2 | 2 |
| Washington | CFP | Not released | | | | | | | | | 5 | 5 | 5 | 4 | 3 | 2 | |
| Washington State | AP | | RV | 23 | 21 | 16 | 13 | 19 | RV | | | | | | | | |
| Washington State | C | RV | RV | RV | 24 | 17 | 14 | 19 | | | | | | | | | |
| Washington State | CFP | Not released | | | | | | | | | | | | | | | |

Legend
| | Improvement in ranking |
| | Drop in ranking |
| | Not ranked previous week |
| | No change in ranking from previous week |
| RV | Received votes but were not ranked in Top 25 of poll |
| т | Tied for listed ranking with another team |

== Schedules ==
Index to colors and formatting
Pac-12 member won
Pac-12 member lost
Pac-12 teams in **bold**

All times Pacific time.

† denotes Homecoming game

Rankings reflect those of the AP poll for weeks 1 through 9. Rankings from Week 10 until the end of the Season reflect those of the College Football Playoff Rankings.

=== Regular season ===
The regular season began on August 26, 2023, and ended on December 1, 2023.

==== Week 0 ====
| Date | Time | Visiting team | Home team | Site | TV | Result | Attendance | Ref. |
|---|---|---|---|---|---|---|---|---|
| August 26 | 5:00 p.m. | San Jose State | No. 6 **USC** | LA Memorial Coliseum • Los Angeles, CA | P12N | **W** 56–28 | 63,411 | |
^{#}Rankings from AP Poll released prior to game. All times are in Pacific Time.

==== Week 1 ====
| Date | Time | Visiting team | Home team | Site | TV | Result | Attendance | Ref. |
|---|---|---|---|---|---|---|---|---|
| August 31 | 5:00 p.m. | Florida | No. 14 **Utah** | Rice–Eccles Stadium • Salt Lake City, UT | ESPN | **W** 24–11 | 53,644 | |
| August 31 | 7:00 p.m. | Southern Utah | **Arizona State** | Mountain America Stadium • Tempe, AZ | P12N | **W** 24–21 | 47,773 | |
| September 1 | 8:00 p.m. | **Stanford** | Hawaii | Clarence T. C. Ching Athletics Complex • Honolulu, HI | CBSSN | **W** 37–24 | 13,739 | |
| September 2 | 9:00 a.m. | **Colorado** | No. 17 TCU | Amon G. Carter Stadium • Fort Worth, TX (Big Noon Kickoff) | FOX | **W** 45–42 | 53,294 | |
| September 2 | 12:00 p.m. | Portland State | No. 15 **Oregon** | Autzen Stadium • Eugene, OR | P12N | **W** 81–7 | 45,723 | |
| September 2 | 12:30 p.m. | Boise State | No. 10 **Washington** | Husky Stadium • Seattle, WA | ABC | **W** 56–19 | 67,475 | |
| September 2 | 1:00 p.m. | **California** | North Texas | DATCU Stadium • Denton, TX | ESPNU | **W** 58–21 | 21,350 | |
| September 2 | 3:30 p.m. | Nevada | No. 6 **USC** | LA Memorial Coliseum • Los Angeles, CA | P12N | **W** 66–14 | 62,916 | |
| September 2 | 4:00 p.m. | **Washington State** | Colorado State | Canvas Stadium • Fort Collins, CO | CBSSN | **W** 50-24 | 31,497 | |
| September 2 | 7:00 p.m. | Northern Arizona | **Arizona** | Arizona Stadium • Tucson, AZ | P12N | **W** 38–3 | 48,159 | |
| September 2 | 7:30 p.m. | Coastal Carolina | **UCLA** | Rose Bowl Stadium • Pasadena, CA | ESPN | **W** 27–13 | 43,705 | |
| September 3 | 12:30 p.m. | No. 18 **Oregon State** | San Jose State | CEFCU Stadium • San Jose, CA | CBS | **W** 42–17 | 20,337 | |
^{#}Rankings from AP Poll released prior to game. All times are in Pacific Time.

==== Week 2 ====
| Date | Time | Visiting team | Home team | Site | TV | Result | Attendance | Ref. |
|---|---|---|---|---|---|---|---|---|
| September 9 | 9:00 a.m. | Nebraska | No. 22 **Colorado** | Folsom Field • Boulder, CO (Big Noon Kickoff/rivalry) | FOX | **W** 36–14 | 53,241 | |
| September 9 | 9:00 a.m. | No. 12 **Utah** | Baylor | McLane Stadium • Waco, TX | ESPN | **W** 20–13 | 43,732 | |
| September 9 | 2:00 p.m. | Tulsa | No. 8 **Washington** | Husky Stadium • Seattle, WA | P12N | **W** 43-10 | 63,128 | |
| September 9 | 4:00 p.m. | No. 13 **Oregon** | Texas Tech | Jones AT&T Stadium • Lubbock, TX | FOX | **W** 38–30 | 56,200 | |
| September 9 | 4:30 p.m. | No. 19 Wisconsin | **Washington State** | Martin Stadium • Pullman, WA | ABC | **W** 31–22 | 33,024 | |
| September 9 | 4:30 p.m. | **UCLA** | San Diego State | Snapdragon Stadium • San Diego, CA | CBS | **W** 35–10 | 32,017 | |
| September 9 | 4:30 p.m. | **Arizona** | Mississippi State | Davis Wade Stadium • Starkville, MS | SECN | **L** 24–31 ^{OT} | 51,648 | |
| September 9 | 6:00 p.m. | No. 15 (FCS) UC Davis | No. 16 **Oregon State** | Reser Stadium • Corvallis, OR | P12N | **W** 55–7 | 35,728 | |
| September 9 | 7:30 p.m. | Oklahoma State | **Arizona State** | Mountain America Stadium • Tempe, AZ | FS1 | **L** 15–27 | 42,569 | |
| September 9 | 7:30 p.m. | Auburn | **California** | California Memorial Stadium • Berkeley, CA | ESPN | **L** 10–14 | 44,141 | |
| September 9 | 7:30 p.m. | **Stanford** | No. 6 **USC** | LA Memorial Coliseum • Los Angeles, CA (rivalry) | FOX | **USC** 56–10 | 67,213 | |
^{#}Rankings from AP Poll released prior to game. All times are in Pacific Time.

==== Week 3 ====
| Date | Time | Visiting team | Home team | Site | TV | Result | Attendance | Ref. |
|---|---|---|---|---|---|---|---|---|
| September 16 | 11:00 a.m. | No. 9 (FCS) Weber State | No. 12 **Utah** | Rice–Eccles Stadium • Salt Lake City, UT | P12N | **W** 31–7 | 51,532 | |
| September 16 | 12:30 p.m. | San Diego State | No. 16 **Oregon State** | Reser Stadium • Corvallis, OR | FS1 | **W** 26–9 | 35,591 | |
| September 16 | 1:00 p.m. | No. 5 (FCS) Idaho | **California** | California Memorial Stadium • Berkeley, CA | P12N | **W** 31–17 | 36,810 | |
| September 16 | 2:00 p.m. | No. 8 **Washington** | Michigan State | Spartan Stadium • East Lansing, MI | Peacock | **W** 41–7 | 70,528 | |
| September 16 | 2:00 p.m. | No. 17 (FCS) North Carolina Central | No. 24 **UCLA** | Rose Bowl Stadium • Pasadena, CA | P12N | **W** 59–7 | 38,343 | |
| September 16 | 2:00 p.m. | Northern Colorado | No. 23 **Washington State** | Martin Stadium • Pullman, WA | P12N | **W** 64–21 | 23,595 | |
| September 16 | 5:00 p.m. | No. 8 (FCS) Sacramento State | **Stanford** | Stanford Stadium • Stanford, CA | P12N | **L** 23–30 | 23,848 | |
| September 16 | 5:00 p.m. | Hawaii | No. 13 **Oregon** | Autzen Stadium • Eugene, OR | P12N | **W** 55–10 | 52,779 | |
| September 16 | 7:00 p.m. | Colorado State | No. 18 **Colorado** | Folsom Field • Boulder, CO (Rocky Mountain Showdown/College GameDay/Big Noon Kickoff) | ESPN | **W** 43–35 ^{2OT} | 53,141 | |
| September 16 | 7:30 p.m. | Fresno State | **Arizona State** | Mountain America Stadium • Tempe, AZ | FS1 | **L** 0–29 | 46,723 | |
| September 16 | 8:00 p.m. | UTEP | **Arizona** | Arizona Stadium • Tucson, AZ | P12N | **W** 31–10 | 44,182 | |
^{#}Rankings from AP Poll released prior to game. All times are in Pacific Time.

| Date | Bye Week |
|---|---|
| September 16 | No. 5 **USC** |

==== Week 4 ====
| Date | Time | Visiting team | Home team | Site | TV | Result | Attendance | Ref. |
|---|---|---|---|---|---|---|---|---|
| September 23 | 12:30 p.m. | No. 19 **Colorado** | No. 10 **Oregon** | Autzen Stadium • Eugene, OR | ABC | **ORE** 42–6 | 59,889 | |
| September 23 | 12:30 p.m. | No. 22 **UCLA** | No. 11 **Utah** † | Rice–Eccles Stadium • Salt Lake City, UT | FOX | **UTAH** 14–7 | 52,919 | |
| September 23 | 4:00 p.m. | No. 14 **Oregon State** | No. 21 **Washington State** | Martin Stadium • Pullman, WA | FOX | **WSU** 38–35 | 33,024 | |
| September 23 | 4:00 p.m. | **Arizona** | **Stanford** | Stanford Stadium • Stanford, CA | P12N | **ARIZ** 21–20 | 38,046 | |
| September 23 | 7:30 p.m. | No. 5 **USC** | **Arizona State** | Mountain America Stadium • Tempe, AZ | FOX | **USC** 42–28 | 54,166 | |
| September 23 | 7:30 p.m. | **California** | No. 8 **Washington** | Husky Stadium • Seattle, WA | ESPN | **WASH** 59–32 | 69,107 | |
^{#}Rankings from AP Poll released prior to game. All times are in Pacific Time.

==== Week 5 ====
| Date | Time | Visiting team | Home team | Site | TV | Result | Attendance | Ref. |
|---|---|---|---|---|---|---|---|---|
| September 29 | 6:00 p.m. | No. 10 **Utah** | No. 19 **Oregon State** | Reser Stadium • Corvallis, OR | FS1 | **OSU** 21–7 | 37,372 | |
| September 30 | 9:00 a.m. | No. 8 **USC** | **Colorado** | Folsom Field • Boulder, CO (Big Noon Kickoff) | FOX | **USC** 48–41 | 54,032 | |
| September 30 | 12:00 p.m. | **Arizona State** | **California** | California Memorial Stadium • Berkeley, CA | P12N | **CAL** 24–21 | 34,353 | |
| September 30 | 3:30 p.m. | No. 9 **Oregon** | **Stanford** | Stanford Stadium • Stanford, CA | P12N | **ORE** 42–6 | 32,160 | |
| September 30 | 7:00 p.m. | No. 7 **Washington** | **Arizona** | Arizona Stadium • Tucson, AZ | P12N | **WASH** 31–24 | 50,800 | |
^{#}Rankings from AP Poll released prior to game. All times are in Pacific Time.

| Date | Bye Week | |
|---|---|---|
| September 30 | **UCLA** | No. 16 **Washington State** |

==== Week 6 ====
| Date | Time | Visiting team | Home team | Site | TV | Result | Attendance | Ref. |
|---|---|---|---|---|---|---|---|---|
| October 7 | 12:00 p.m. | No. 13 **Washington State** | **UCLA** | Rose Bowl • Pasadena, CA | P12N | **UCLA** 25–17 | 35,437 | |
| October 7 | 3:30 p.m. | **Colorado** | **Arizona State** | Mountain America Stadium • Tempe, AZ | P12N | **COL** 27–24 | 54,086 | |
| October 7 | 7:00 p.m. | No. 15 **Oregon State** | **California** † | California Memorial Stadium • Berkeley, CA | P12N | **OSU** 52–40 | 34,930 | |
| October 7 | 7:30 p.m. | **Arizona** | No. 9 **USC** | LA Memorial Coliseum • Los Angeles, CA | ESPN | **USC** 43–41^{3OT} | 62,916 | |
^{#}Rankings from AP Poll released prior to game. All times are in Pacific Time.

| Date | Bye Week | | | |
|---|---|---|---|---|
| October 7 | No. 8 **Oregon** | **Stanford** | No. 18 **Utah** | No. 7 **Washington** |

==== Week 7 ====
| Date | Time | Visiting team | Home team | Site | TV | Result | Attendance | Ref. |
|---|---|---|---|---|---|---|---|---|
| October 13 | 7:00 p.m. | **Stanford** | **Colorado** | Folsom Field • Boulder, CO | ESPN | **STAN** 46–43 ^{2OT} | 53,154 | |
| October 14 | 12:00 p.m. | **California** | No. 16 **Utah** | Rice–Eccles Stadium • Salt Lake City, UT | P12N | **UTAH** 34–14 | 52,115 | |
| October 14 | 12:30 p.m. | No. 8 **Oregon** | No. 7 **Washington** | Husky Stadium • Seattle, WA (Oregon–Washington football rivalry/College Gameday) | ABC | **WASH** 36–33 | 71,321 | |
| October 14 | 4:00 p.m. | **Arizona** | No. 19 **Washington State** † | Martin Stadium • Pullman, WA | P12N | **ARIZ** 44–6 | 26,155 | |
| October 14 | 4:30 p.m. | No. 10 **USC** | No. 21 Notre Dame | Notre Dame Stadium • South Bend, IN (Notre Dame–USC football rivalry/ Big Noon Kickoff) | NBC | **L** 20–48 | 77,622 | |
| October 14 | 5:00 p.m. | No. 18 **UCLA** | No. 15 **Oregon State** † | Reser Stadium • Corvallis, OR | FOX | **OSU** 36–24 | 37,600 | |
^{#}Rankings from AP Poll released prior to game. All times are in Pacific Time.

| Date | Bye Week |
|---|---|
| October 14 | **Arizona State** |

==== Week 8 ====
| Date | Time | Visiting team | Home team | Site | TV | Result | Attendance | Ref. |
|---|---|---|---|---|---|---|---|---|
| October 21 | 12:30 p.m. | **Washington State** | No. 9 **Oregon** † | Autzen Stadium • Eugene, OR | ABC | **ORE** 38–24 | 58,886 | |
| October 21 | 5:00 p.m. | No. 14 **Utah** | No. 18 **USC** | LA Memorial Coliseum • Los Angeles, CA | FOX | **UTAH** 34–32 | 61,551 | |
| October 21 | 7:30 p.m. | **Arizona State** | No. 5 **Washington** † | Husky Stadium • Seattle, WA | FS1 | **WASH** 15–7 | 68,379 | |
| October 21 | 7:30 p.m. | No. 25 **UCLA** | **Stanford** † | Stanford Stadium • Stanford, CA | ESPN | **UCLA** 42–7 | 30,225 | |
^{#}Rankings from AP Poll released prior to game. All times are in Pacific Time.

| Date | Bye Week | | | |
|---|---|---|---|---|
| October 21 | **Arizona** | **California** | **Colorado** | No. 12 **Oregon State** |

==== Week 9 ====
| Date | Time | Visiting team | Home team | Site | TV | Result | Attendance | Ref. |
|---|---|---|---|---|---|---|---|---|
| October 28 | 12:30 p.m. | No. 8 **Oregon** | No. 13 **Utah** | Rice–Eccles Stadium • Salt Lake City, UT (College GameDay) | FOX | **ORE** 35–6 | 53,586 | |
| October 28 | 1:00 p.m. | No. 24 **USC** | **California** | California Memorial Stadium • Berkeley, CA | P12N | **USC** 50–49 | 43,716 | |
| October 28 | 4:00 p.m. | No. 5 **Washington** | **Stanford** | Stanford Stadium • Stanford, CA | FS1 | **WASH** 42–33 | 24,381 | |
| October 28 | 4:30 p.m. | **Colorado** | No. 23 **UCLA** † | Rose Bowl • Pasadena, CA | ABC | **UCLA** 28–16 | 71,343 | |
| October 28 | 5:00 p.m. | **Washington State** | **Arizona State** † | Mountain America Stadium • Tempe, AZ | P12N | **ASU** 38–27 | 47,284 | |
| October 28 | 7:30 p.m. | No. 11 **Oregon State** | **Arizona** | Arizona Stadium • Tucson, AZ | ESPN | **ARIZ** 27–24 | 45,023 | |
^{#}Rankings from AP Poll released prior to game. All times are in Pacific Time.

==== Week 10 ====
| Date | Time | Visiting team | Home team | Site | TV | Result | Attendance | Ref. |
|---|---|---|---|---|---|---|---|---|
| November 4 | 11:00 a.m. | **Arizona State** | No. 18 **Utah** | Rice–Eccles Stadium • Salt Lake City, UT | P12N | **UTAH** 55–3 | 52,104 | |
| November 4 | 2:30 p.m. | **California** | No. 6 **Oregon** | Autzen Stadium • Eugene, OR | P12N | **ORE** 63–19 | 54,046 | |
| November 4 | 4:30 p.m. | No. 5 **Washington** | No. 20 **USC** † | LA Memorial Coliseum • Los Angeles, CA | ABC | **WASH** 52–42 | 77,500 | |
| November 4 | 6:00 p.m. | **Stanford** | **Washington State** | Martin Stadium • Pullman, WA | P12N | **STAN** 10–7 | 24,385 | |
| November 4 | 7:00 p.m. | No. 16 **Oregon State** | **Colorado** † | Folsom Field • Boulder, CO | ESPN | **OSU** 26–19 | 52,725 | |
| November 4 | 7:30 p.m. | No. 19 **UCLA** | **Arizona** † | Arizona Stadium • Tucson, AZ | FS1 | **ARIZ** 27–10 | 44,956 | |
^{#}Rankings from College Football Playoff. All times are in Pacific Time.

==== Week 11 ====
| Date | Time | Visiting team | Home team | Site | TV | Result | Attendance | Ref. |
|---|---|---|---|---|---|---|---|---|
| November 11 | 11:00 a.m. | No. 21 **Arizona** | **Colorado** | Folsom Field • Boulder, CO | P12N | **ARIZ** 34–31 | 52,788 | |
| November 11 | 12:30 p.m. | No. 18 **Utah** | No. 5 **Washington** | Husky Stadium • Seattle, WA | ESPN | **WASH** 35–28 | 70,976 | |
| November 11 | 1:00 p.m. | **Washington State** | **California** | California Memorial Stadium • Berkeley, CA | ESPN2 | **CAL** 42–39 | 38,155 | |
| November 11 | 2:30 p.m. | **Stanford** | No. 12 **Oregon State** | Reser Stadium • Corvallis, OR | P12N | **OSU** 62–17 | 37,107 | |
| November 11 | 6:00 p.m. | **Arizona State** | **UCLA** | Rose Bowl • Pasadena, CA | P12N | **ASU** 17–7 | 56,436 | |
| November 11 | 7:30 p.m. | **USC** | No. 6 **Oregon** | Autzen Stadium • Eugene, OR | FOX | **ORE** 36–27 | 59,957 | |
^{#}Rankings from College Football Playoff. All times are in Pacific Time.

==== Week 12 ====
| Date | Time | Visiting team | Home team | Site | TV | Result | Attendance | Ref. |
|---|---|---|---|---|---|---|---|---|
| November 17 | 7:30 p.m. | **Colorado** | **Washington State** | Martin Stadium • Pullman, WA | FS1 | **WSU** 56–14 | 27,868 | |
| November 18 | 11:30 a.m. | No. 22 **Utah** | No. 17 **Arizona** | Arizona Stadium • Tucson, AZ | P12N | **ARIZ** 42–18 | 50,800 | |
| November 18 | 12:30 p.m. | **UCLA** | **USC** | LA Memorial Coliseum • Los Angeles, CA (Victory Bell) | ABC | **UCLA** 38–20 | 72,243 | |
| November 18 | 1:00 p.m. | No. 6 **Oregon** | **Arizona State** | Mountain America Stadium • Tempe, AZ | FOX | **ORE** 49–13 | 44,741 | |
| November 18 | 3:30 p.m. | **California** | **Stanford** | Stanford Stadium • Stanford, CA (126th Big Game/Stanford Axe) | P12N | **CAL** 27–15 | 52,971 | |
| November 18 | 4:30 p.m. | No. 5 **Washington** | No. 11 **Oregon State** | Reser Stadium • Corvallis, OR | ABC | **WASH** 22–20 | 38,415 | |
^{#}Rankings from College Football Playoff. All times are in Pacific Time.

==== Week 13 ====
| Date | Time | Visiting team | Home team | Site | TV | Result | Attendance | Ref. |
|---|---|---|---|---|---|---|---|---|
| November 24 | 5:30 p.m. | No. 16 **Oregon State** | No. 6 **Oregon** | Autzen Stadium • Eugene, OR (rivalry) | FOX | **ORE** 31–7 | 59,987 | |
| November 25 | 12:00 p.m. | **Colorado** | **Utah** | Rice-Eccles Stadium • Salt Lake City, UT (Rumble in the Rockies) | P12N | **UTAH** 23–17 | 51,595 | |
| November 25 | 12:30 p.m. | No. 15 **Arizona** | **Arizona State** | Mountain America Stadium • Tempe, AZ (Territorial Cup) | ESPN | **ARIZ** 59–23 | 53,414 | |
| November 25 | 1:00 p.m. | **Washington State** | No. 4 **Washington** | Husky Stadium • Seattle, WA (Apple Cup) | FOX | **WASH** 24–21 | 71,312 | |
| November 25 | 4:00 p.m. | No. 18 Notre Dame | **Stanford** | Stanford Stadium • Stanford, CA (rivalry) | P12N | **L** 23–56 | 30,901 | |
| November 25 | 7:30 p.m. | **California** | **UCLA** | Rose Bowl • Pasadena, CA (rivalry) | ESPN | **CAL** 33–7 | 42,439 | |
^{#}Rankings from College Football Playoff. All times are in Pacific Time.

| Date | Bye Week |
|---|---|
| November 25 | **USC** |

=== Pac-12 Championship Game ===
The Pac-12 Championship Game, its thirteenth and final championship game, was played on December 1, 2023, at Allegiant Stadium in Paradise, Nevada. Starting in 2022, the conference had no divisions, and the two teams with the highest conference winning percentage faced off in the championship game.

| Date | Time | Visiting team | Home team | Site | TV | Result | Attendance | Ref. |
|---|---|---|---|---|---|---|---|---|
| December 1, 2023 | 5:00 p.m. | No. 5 **Oregon** | No. 3 **Washington** | Allegiant Stadium • Paradise, NV | ABC | **WASH** 34–31 | 61,195 | |
^{#}Rankings from College Football Playoff. All times are in Pacific Time.

== Postseason ==
=== Bowl games ===
For the 2020–2025 bowl cycle, The Pac-12 will have annually seven appearances in the following bowls: Rose Bowl (unless they are selected for playoffs filled by a Pac-12 team if champion is in the playoffs), LA Bowl, Las Vegas Bowl, Alamo Bowl, Holiday Bowl, and Sun Bowl. The Pac-12 teams will go to a New Year's Six bowl if a team finishes higher than the champions of Power Five conferences in the final College Football Playoff rankings. The Pac-12 champion are also eligible for the College Football Playoff if they're among the top four teams in the final CFP ranking. On August 27, Arizona State announced a self imposed 2023 bowl game ban due to recruiting violations from the 2020 season, making them ineligible for post season play.

Legend
| Pac-12 win |
| Pac-12 loss |

| Bowl game | Date | Site | Television | Time (PST) | Pac-12 team | Opponent | Score | Attendance | Game MVP |
|---|---|---|---|---|---|---|---|---|---|
| LA Bowl | December 16, 2023 | SoFi Stadium • Inglewood, CA | ABC | 4:30 p.m. | UCLA | Boise State | 35–22 | 32,780 | Ethan Garbers, QB; Darius Muasau, LB |
| Independence Bowl | December 16, 2023 | Independence Stadium • Shreveport, LA | ESPN | 6:15 p.m. | California | Texas Tech | 14–34 | 33,071 | Behren Morton, QB; Jacob Rodriguez, LB |
| SRS Distribution Las Vegas Bowl | December 23, 2023 | Allegiant Stadium • Paradise, NV | ESPN | 4:30 p.m. | Utah | Northwestern | 7–14 | 20,897 | Ben Bryant, QB |
| Holiday Bowl | December 27, 2023 | Petco Park • San Diego, CA | FOX | 5:00 p.m. | USC | No. 15 Louisville | 42–28 | 35,317 | Miller Moss, QB; Jaylin Smith, S |
| Alamo Bowl | December 28, 2023 | Alamodome • San Antonio, TX | ESPN | 6:15 p.m. | No. 14 Arizona | No. 12 Oklahoma | 38–24 | 55,853 | Jacob Cowing, WR; Gunner Maldonado, S |
| Tony the Tiger Sun Bowl | December 29, 2023 | Sun Bowl • El Paso, TX | CBS | 11:00 a.m. | No. 19 Oregon State | No. 16 Notre Dame | 8–40 | 48,223 | Jordan Faison WR |
**New Year's Six Bowl**
| Fiesta Bowl | January 1, 2024 | State Farm Stadium • Phoenix, AZ | ESPN | 10:00 a.m. PT | No. 8 Oregon | No. 23 Liberty | 45–6 | 47,769 | Bo Nix, QB |
| Sugar Bowl (CFB Playoff semifinal)† | January 1, 2024 | Caesars Superdome • New Orleans, LA | ESPN | 5:45 p.m. PT | No. 2 Washington | No. 3 Texas | 37–31 | 68,791 | Michael Penix Jr., QB; Bralen Trice, DE |
**College Football Playoff National Championship**
| CFP National Championship Game‡ | January 8, 2024 | NRG Stadium • Houston, TX | ESPN | 5:30 PM | No. 2 Washington | No. 1 Michigan | 13–34 | 72,808 | Blake Corum, RB; Will Johnson, S |

Rankings are from CFB Rankings. All times Pacific Time Zone. Pac-12 teams shown in bold.
†CFP semifinal game
‡CFP National Championship Game

=== Selection of teams ===
- **Bowl eligible (8): Arizona, California, Oregon, Oregon State, UCLA, USC, Utah, Washington**
- **Bowl-ineligible (4): Arizona State, Colorado, Stanford, Washington State**

== Head to head matchups ==
This table summarizes the head-to-head results between teams in conference play.

| | Arizona | Arizona State | California | Colorado | Oregon | Oregon State | Stanford | UCLA | USC | Utah | Washington | Washington State |
|---|---|---|---|---|---|---|---|---|---|---|---|---|
| vs. Arizona | – | 0–1 | 0–0 | 0–1 | 0–0 | 0–1 | 0–1 | 0–1 | 1–0 | 0–1 | 1–0 | 0–1 |
| vs. Arizona State | 1–0 | – | 1–0 | 1–0 | 1–0 | 0–0 | 0–0 | 0–1 | 1–0 | 1–0 | 1–0 | 0–1 |
| vs. California | 0–0 | 0–1 | – | 0–0 | 1–0 | 1–0 | 0–1 | 0–1 | 1–0 | 1–0 | 1–0 | 0–1 |
| vs. Colorado | 1–0 | 0–1 | 0–0 | – | 1–0 | 1–0 | 1–0 | 1–0 | 1–0 | 1–0 | 0–0 | 1–0 |
| vs. Oregon | 0–0 | 0–1 | 0–1 | 0–1 | – | 0–1 | 0–1 | 0–0 | 0–1 | 0–1 | 1–0 | 0–1 |
| vs. Oregon State | 1–0 | 0–0 | 0–1 | 0–1 | 1–0 | – | 0–1 | 0–1 | 0–0 | 0–1 | 1–0 | 1–0 |
| vs. Stanford | 1–0 | 0–0 | 1–0 | 0–1 | 1–0 | 1–0 | – | 1–0 | 1–0 | 0–0 | 1–0 | 0–1 |
| vs. UCLA | 1–0 | 1–0 | 1–0 | 0–1 | 0–0 | 1–0 | 0–1 | – | 0–1 | 1–0 | 0–0 | 0–1 |
| vs. USC | 0–1 | 0–1 | 0–1 | 0–1 | 1–0 | 0–0 | 0–1 | 1–0 | – | 1–0 | 1–0 | 0–0 |
| vs. Utah | 1–0 | 0–1 | 0–1 | 0–1 | 1–0 | 1–0 | 0–0 | 0–1 | 0–1 | – | 1–0 | 0–0 |
| vs. Washington | 0–1 | 0–1 | 0–1 | 0–0 | 0–1 | 0–1 | 0–1 | 0–0 | 0–1 | 0–1 | – | 0–1 |
| vs. Washington State | 1–0 | 1–0 | 1–0 | 0–1 | 1–0 | 0–1 | 1–0 | 1–0 | 0–0 | 0–0 | 1–0 | – |
| Total | 7–2 | 2–7 | 4–5 | 1–8 | 8–1 | 5–4 | 2–7 | 4–5 | 5–4 | 5–4 | 9–0 | 2–7 |

Updated with the results of all games through the 2023 season.

=== Pac-12 records vs Other Conferences ===
2023–2024 records against non-conference foes:

Regular season

| Power 5 Conferences | Record |
|---|---|
| Big Ten | 3–0 |
| Big 12 | 3–1 |
| Notre Dame | 0–2 |
| SEC | 1–2 |
| Power 5 Total | 7–5 |
| Other FBS Conferences | Record |
| American | 2–0 |
| C–USA | 1–0 |
| Mountain West | 10–1 |
| Sun Belt | 1–0 |
| Other FBS Total | 14–1 |
| FCS Opponents | Record |
| Football Championship Subdivision | 8–1 |
| Total Non-Conference Record | 29–7 |

Post Season

| Power Conferences 5 | Record |
|---|---|
| ACC | 1–0 |
| Big Ten | 0–2 |
| Big 12 | 2–1 |
| Notre Dame | 0–1 |
| Power 5 Total | 3–4 |
| Other FBS Conferences | Record |
| C–USA | 1–0 |
| Mountain West | 1–0 |
| Other FBS Total | 2–0 |
| Total Bowl Record | 5–3 |

=== Pac-12 vs Power Five matchups ===
The following games include Pac-12 teams competing against Power Five conference teams from the ACC, Big Ten, Big 12, and SEC, plus independent Notre Dame (an ACC member in non-football sports). All rankings are from the AP Poll at the time of the game.

| Date | Conference | Visitor | Home | Site | Score |
|---|---|---|---|---|---|
| August 31 | SEC | Florida | No. 14 Utah | Rice–Eccles Stadium • Salt Lake City, UT | W 24–11 |
| September 2 | Big 12 | Colorado | No. 17 TCU | Amon G. Carter Stadium • Fort Worth, TX | W 45–42 |
| September 9 | SEC | Arizona | Mississippi State | Davis Wade Stadium • Starkville, MS | L 24–31^{OT} |
| September 9 | Big 12 | Oklahoma State | Arizona State | Mountain America Stadium • Tempe, AZ | L 15–27 |
| September 9 | SEC | Auburn | California | California Memorial Stadium • Berkeley, CA | L 10–14 |
| September 9 | Big Ten | Nebraska | No. 22 Colorado | Folsom Field • Boulder, CO | W 36–14 |
| September 9 | Big 12 | No. 13 Oregon | Texas Tech | Jones AT&T Stadium • Lubbock, TX | W 38–30 |
| September 9 | Big 12 | No. 12 Utah | Baylor | McLane Stadium • Waco, TX | W 20–13 |
| September 9 | Big Ten | No. 19 Wisconsin | Washington State | Martin Stadium • Pullman, WA | W 31–22 |
| September 16 | Big Ten | No. 8 Washington | Michigan State | Spartan Stadium • East Lansing, MI | W 41–7 |
| October 14 | Independent | No. 10 USC | No. 21 Notre Dame | Notre Dame Stadium • South Bend, IN | L 20–41 |
| November 25 | Independent | No. 20 Notre Dame | Stanford | Stanford Stadium • Stanford, CA | L 23–56 |

=== Pac-12 vs Group of Five matchups ===
The following games include Pac-12 teams competing against teams from the American, C-USA, MAC, Mountain West or Sun Belt.

| Date | Conference | Visitor | Home | Site | Score |
|---|---|---|---|---|---|
| August 26 | Mountain West | San Jose State | No. 6 USC | LA Memorial Coliseum • Los Angeles, CA | W 56–28 |
| September 1 | Mountain West | Stanford | Hawaii | Clarence T. C. Ching Athletics Complex • Honolulu, HI | W 37–24 |
| September 2 | American | California | North Texas | DATCU Stadium • Denton, TX | W 58–21 |
| September 2 | Sun Belt | Coastal Carolina | UCLA | Rose Bowl Stadium • Pasadena, CA | W 27–13 |
| September 2 | Mountain West | Nevada | No. 6 USC | LA Memorial Coliseum • Los Angeles, CA | W 66–14 |
| September 2 | Mountain West | Boise State | No. 10 Washington | Husky Stadium • Seattle, WA | W 56–19 |
| September 2 | Mountain West | Washington State | Colorado State | Canvas Stadium • Fort Collins, CO | W 50–24 |
| September 3 | Mountain West | No. 18 Oregon State | San Jose State | CEFCU Stadium • San Jose, CA | W 42–17 |
| September 9 | Mountain West | UCLA | San Diego State | Snapdragon Stadium • San Diego, CA | W 45–10 |
| September 9 | American | Tulsa | No. 8 Washington | Husky Stadium • Seattle, WA | W 43–10 |
| September 16 | Conference USA | UTEP | Arizona | Arizona Stadium • Tucson, AZ | W 35–10 |
| September 16 | Mountain West | Fresno State | Arizona State | Mountain America Stadium • Tempe, AZ | L 0–20 |
| September 16 | Mountain West | Colorado State | No. 18 Colorado | Folsom • Boulder, CO | W 43–35^{2OT} |
| September 16 | Mountain West | Hawaii | No. 13 Oregon | Autzen Stadium • Eugene, OR | W 55–7 |
| September 16 | Mountain West | San Diego State | No. 16 Oregon State | Reser Stadium • Corvallis, OR | W 26–9 |

=== Pac-12 vs FCS matchups ===
The Football Championship Subdivision comprises 13 conferences and two independent programs.

| Date | Visitor | Home | Site | Score |
|---|---|---|---|---|
| August 31 | Southern Utah | Arizona State | Mountain America Stadium • Tempe, AZ | W 24–21 |
| September 2 | Northern Arizona | Arizona | Arizona Stadium • Tucson, AZ | W 38–3 |
| September 2 | Portland State | No. 15 Oregon | Autzen Stadium • Eugene, OR | W 81–7 |
| September 9 | UC Davis | No. 16 Oregon State | Reser Stadium • Corvallis, OR | W 55–7 |
| September 16 | Idaho | California | California Memorial Stadium • Berkeley, CA | W 31–17 |
| September 16 | Sacramento State | Stanford | Stanford Stadium • Stanford, CA | L 22–30 |
| September 16 | North Carolina Central | No. 24 UCLA | Rose Bowl Stadium • Pasadena, CA | W 59–7 |
| September 16 | Weber State | No. 12 Utah | Rice–Eccles Stadium • Salt Lake City, UT | W 31–7 |
| September 16 | Northern Colorado | No. 23 Washington State | Martin Stadium • Pullman, WA | W 64–21 |

Note:† Denotes Neutral Site Game

== Awards and honors ==
=== Player of the week honors ===
| Date | Offensive | | | Defensive | | | Special Teams | | | Offensive line | | | Defensive line | | | Freshman | | |
| Date | Player | Team | Position | Player | Team | Position | Player | Team | Position | Player | Team | Position | Player | Team | Position | Player | Team | Position |
|---|---|---|---|---|---|---|---|---|---|---|---|---|---|---|---|---|---|---|
| Week 1 | Shedeur Sanders | Colorado | QB | Travis Hunter | Colorado | DB | Jack Bouwmeester | Utah | P | Brian Driscoll | California | LG/C | David Bailey | Stanford | OLB | Dylan Edwards | Colorado | RB |
| Week 2 | Bo Nix | Oregon | QB | Ron Stone Jr. | Washington State | EDGE | Zachariah Branch | USC | WR/KR | Gerad Christian-Lichtenhan | Colorado | LT | Ron Stone Jr. | Washington State | EDGE | Dante Moore | UCLA | QB |
| Week 3 | Michael Penix Jr. | Washington | QB | Shilo Sanders | Colorado | S | Jack Bouwmeester (2) | Utah | P | Joshua Gray | Oregon State | LT | Zion Tupuola-Fetui | Washington | EDGE | Parker Brailsford | Washington | C |
| Week 4 | Cam Ward | Washington State | QB | Karene Reid | Utah | LB | Rome Odunze | Washington | WR/KR | Jackson Powers-Johnson | Oregon | C | Jonah Elliss | Utah | DE | Tackett Curtis | USC | ILB |
| Week 5 | Caleb Williams | USC | QB | Easton Mascarenas-Arnold | Oregon State | LB | Lachlan Wilson | Cal | P | Tanner Miller | Oregon State | C | Jonah Elliss (2) | Utah | DE | Omarion Miller | Colorado | WR |
| Week 6 | DJ Uiagalelei | Oregon State | QB | Laiatu Latu | UCLA | DE | Alejandro Mata | Colorado | PK | Joshua Gray (2) | Oregon State | LT | Laiatu Latu | UCLA | DE | Noah Fifita | Arizona | QB |
| Week 7 | Elic Ayomanor | Stanford | WR | Ryan Cooper | Oregon State | DB | Joshua Karty | Stanford | PK | Taliese Fuaga | Oregon State | LT | Sione Lolohea | UCLA | DL | Noah Fifita (2) | Arizona | QB |
| Week 8 | Bryson Barnes | Utah | QB | Mishael Powell | Washington | CB | Cole Becker | Utah | PK | Sataoa Laumea | Utah | RT | Van Fillinger | Utah | DE | Matayo Uiagalelei | Oregon | DE |
| Week 9 | Bo Nix (2) | Oregon | QB | Tysheem Johnson | Oregon | DB | Dario Longhetto | Arizona State | PK | Leif Fautanu | Arizona State | RT | B.J. Green | Arizona State | DE | Noah Fifita (3) | Arizona | QB |
| Week 10 | Dillon Johnson | Washington | RB | Andrew Chatfield | Oregon State | OLB | Joshua Karty (2) | Stanford | PK | Parker Brailsford | Washington | C | Andrew Chatfield | Oregon State | OLB | Noah Fifita (4) | Arizona | QB |
| Week 11 | Bo Nix (3) | Oregon | QB | Cade Uluave | California | ILB | Tyler Loop | Arizona | PK | Brian Driscoll (2) | California | C | Dashaun Mallory | Arizona State | DL | Cade Uluave | California | ILB |
| Week 12 | Bo Nix (4) | Oregon | QB | Jabbar Muhammad | Washington | CB | Joshua Karty (3) | Stanford | PK | Barrett Miller | California | LT | Laiatu Latu (2) | UCLA | DE | Fernando Mendoza | California | QB |
| Week 13 | Tetairoa McMillan | Arizona | WR | Cade Uluave (2) | California | ILB | Jaydn Ott | California | KR | Jackson Powers-Johnson (2) | Oregon | C | David Reese | California | OLD | Noah Fifita (5) | Arizona | QB |

==== Totals per school ====
| School | Total |
|---|---|
| California | 10 |
| Oregon State | 9 |
| Utah | 9 |
| Oregon | 8 |
| Washington | 8 |
| Arizona | 7 |
| Colorado | 7 |
| UCLA | 5 |
| Arizona State | 4 |
| Stanford | 4 |
| USC | 3 |
| Washington State | 3 |

=== Pac-12 individual awards ===
In November 2023, the Pac-12 Conference released their Pac-12 Conference football individual awards and All-Conference Honors at the end of their final season.

| Award | Player/Coaches | School |
|---|---|---|
| Offensive Player of the Year | Bo Nix | Oregon |
| Defensive Player of the Year | Laiatu Latu | UCLA |
| Offensive Freshman of the Year | Noah Fifita | Arizona |
| Defensive Freshman of the Year | Cade Uluave | California |
| Scholar Athlete of the Year | Bo Nix | Oregon |
| Coach of the Year | Kalen DeBoer | Washington |

=== All-conference teams ===
The following players earned All-Pac-12 honors. Any teams showing (_) following their name are indicating the number of All-Pac-12 Conference Honors awarded to that university for 1st team and 2nd team respectively.

First Team

| Position | Player | Class | Team |
|---|---|---|---|
First Team Offense
| QB | Bo Nix | Sr. | Oregon (1) |
| RB | Jaydn Ott | So. | California (1) |
| RB | Damien Martinez† | So. | Oregon State (1) |
| WR | Rome Odunze | Jr. | Washington (1) |
| WR | Troy Franklin | Jr. | Oregon (2) |
| TE | Terrance Ferguson | Jr. | Oregon (3) |
| OL | Taliese Fuaga | Jr. | Oregon State (2) |
| OL | Jackson Powers-Johnson | Jr. | Oregon (4) |
| OL | Troy Fautanu | Jr. | Washington (2) |
| OL | Jordan Morgan | Sr. | Arizona (1) |
| OL | Jake Levengood | R-Sr. | Oregon State (3) |
First Team Defense
| DL | Laiatu Latu† | Sr. | UCLA (1) |
| DL | Jonah Elliss | Jr. | Utah (1) |
| DL | Bralen Trice† | Jr. | Washington (3) |
| DL | Brandon Dorlus | Sr. | Oregon (5) |
| LB | Jacob Manu | So. | Arizona (2) |
| LB | Easton Mascarenas-Arnold | Jr. | Oregon State (4) |
| LB | Edefuan Ulofoshio | Sr. | Washington (4) |
| DB | Travis Hunter | So. | Colorado (1) |
| DB | Khyree Jackson | Sr. | Oregon (7) |
| DB | Sione Vaki | So. | Utah (2) |
| DB | Calen Bullock | Jr. | USC (1) |
First Team special teams
| PK | Joshua Karty† | Sr. | Stanford (1) |
| P | Jack Bouwmeester | So. | Utah (3) |
| RS | Zachariah Branch | Fr. | USC (2) |
| AP/ST | Sione Vaki | So. | Utah (4) |

Second Team

| Position | Player | Class | Team |
|---|---|---|---|
Second Team Offense
| QB | Michael Penix Jr. | Sr. | Washington (5) |
| RB | Bucky Irving | Jr. | Oregon (8) |
| RB | Dillon Johnson | Jr. | Washington (6) |
| WR | Tetairoa McMillan | So. | Arizona (3) |
| WR | Brenden Rice | Sr. | USC (3) |
| TE | Jack Velling | So. | Oregon State (4) |
| OL | Tanner Miller | R-Jr. | Oregon State (5) |
| OL | Parker Brailsford | R-Fr. | Washington (7) |
| OL | Sataoa Laumea | Jr. | Utah (5) |
| OL | Duke Clemens | R-Sr. | UCLA (2) |
| OL | Joshua Gray | R-Jr. | Oregon State (6) |
Second Team Defense
| DL | Brennan Jackson | Gr. | Washington State (1) |
| DL | Junior Tafuna | Jr. | Utah (6) |
| DL | B.J. Green | Jr. | Arizona State (1) |
| DL | Sione Lolohea | Jr. | Oregon State (7) |
| LB | Darius Muasau | R-Sr. | UCLA (3) |
| LB | Jeffrey Bassa | Jr. | Oregon (9) |
| LB | Karene Reid | Jr. | Utah (7) |
| DB | Jabbar Muhammad | Jr. | Washington (8) |
| DB | Cole Bishop | Jr. | Utah (8) |
| DB | Kitan Oladapo | R-Sr. | Oregon State (8) |
| DB | Evan Williams | Sr. | Oregon (10) |
Second Team special teams
| PK | Tyler Loop | Jr. | Arizona (4) |
| P | Lachlan Wilson | R-Jr. | California (2) |
| RS | Silas Bolden | Jr. | Oregon State (9) |
| AP/ST | Travis Hunter | So. | Colorado (2) |

Notes:

- RS = Return specialist
- AP/ST = All-purpose/special teams player (not a kicker or returner)
- † Two-time first team selection;
- ‡ Three-time first team selection

Honorable mentions

- ARIZONA: RB Jonah Coleman, So.; WR Jacob Cowing, Sr.; DB Tacario Davis, So.; TE Tanner McLachlan, R-Sr.; DB Ephesians Prysock, So.; OL Jonah Savaiinaea, So.; DB Treydan Stukes Jr.; DL Taylor Upshaw, Gr.
- ARIZONA STATE: RS Elijhah Badger, R-Jr.; OL Leif Fautanu, R-Jr.; DL Dashaun Mallory, Gr.; RB Cam Skattebo Jr.
- CALIFORNIA: LB David Reese, R-Sr.; DB Craig Woodson, R-Jr.
- Colorado: QB Shedeur Sanders, Jr.; DB Shilo Sanders, Gr.; P Mark Vassett Jr.
- OREGON: DL Jordan Burch, Jr.; OL Josh Conerly Jr., So.; OL Ajani Cornelius, Jr.; DB Tysheem Johnson, Jr.; WR Tez Johnson, Jr.; OL Steven Jones Sr.;
- OREGON STATE: DB Akili Arnold, R-Jr.; DB Ryan Cooper Jr. Sr.; WR Anthony Gould, R-Jr.; AP/ST Jesiah Irish, R-Sr.; K Atticus Sappington, R-So.
- STANFORD: WR Elic Ayomanor, So.; DB Alaka'i Gilman Sr.; LB Tristan Sinclair, 5th; TE Benjamin Yurosek, Sr.
- UCLA: DB Kenny Churchwell III, R-Sr.; DB Alex Johnson, R-Sr.; TE Moliki Matavao Jr.; LB Kain Medrano Sr.; DL Gabriel Murphy, R-Jr.; DL Grayson Murphy, R-Jr.
- USC: DL Bear Alexander, So.; AP/ST Zachariah Branch, Fr.; DL Solomon Byrd, R-Sr.; OL Justin Dedich, R-Sr.; RB MarShawn Lloyd, R-Jr.; OL Jonah Monheim, R-Jr.; TE Lake McRee, R-So.; WR Tahj Washington, R-Sr.
- UTAH: OL Keaton Bills Jr.; OL Michael Mokofisi, So.; DB Zemaiah Vaughn Jr.
- WASHINGTON: LB Carson Bruener Jr.; TE Devin Culp Sr.; DB Dominique Hampton Sr.; OL Roger Rosengarten, So.; DL Zion Tupuola-Fetui, Sr.; TE Jack Westover Sr.
- WASHINGTON STATE: DB Jaden Hicks, R-So.; DL Ron Stone Jr., R-Sr.; WR Lincoln Victor, Sr.; QB Cam Ward, Jr.

=== All-Americans ===
Currently, the NCAA compiles consensus all-America teams in the sports of Division I-FBS football and Division I men's basketball using a point system computed from All-America teams named by coaches associations or media sources. The system consists of three points for a first-team honor, two points for second-team honor, and one point for third-team honor. Honorable mention and fourth team or lower recognitions are not accorded any points. College Football All-American consensus teams are compiled by position and the player accumulating the most points at each position is named first team consensus all-American. Currently, the NCAA recognizes All-Americans selected by the AP, AFCA, FWAA, TSN, and the WCFF to determine Consensus and Unanimous All-Americans. Any player named to the First Team by all five of the NCAA-recognized selectors is deemed a Unanimous All-American.

| Position | Player | School | Selector | Unanimous | Consensus |
|---|---|---|---|---|---|
First Team All-Americans
| AP/RS | Zachariah Branch | USC | TSN, USAT | | |
| DL | Jonah Elliss | Utah | FWAA, TSN, WCFF, Fox, Phil Steele | | ✓ |
| OL | Taliese Fuaga | Oregon State | FWAA, CBS, Phil Steele | | |
| AP/RS | Travis Hunter | Colorado | AFCA, AP, FWAA, TSN, SI, Phil Steele | | ✓ |
| C | Jackson Powers-Johnson | Oregon | AFCA, AP, FWAA, TSN, WCFF, CBS, The Athletic, Fox, USAT, Phil Steele | ✓ | ✓ |
| DL | Laiatu Latu | UCLA | AFCA, AP, FWAA, TSN, WCFF, CBS, The Athletic, Fox, USAT, SI, Phil Steele | ✓ | ✓ |
| WR | Rome Odunze | Washington | AP, FWAA, TSN, The Athletic, CBS, Fox, SI, Phil Steele | | ✓ |
| AP | Sione Vaki | Utah | Fox | | |

| Position | Player | School | Selector | Unanimous | Consensus |
|---|---|---|---|---|---|
Second Team All-Americans
| RS | Zachariah Branch | USC | FWAA, WCFF, Fox, SI, Phil Steele | | ✓ |
| DL | Jonah Elliss | Utah | AFCA, AP, CBS, USAT | | |
| OL | Troy Fautanu | Washington | AFCA, FWAA | | |
| WR | Troy Franklin | Oregon | AP, FWAA, TSN, CBS, Fox, USAT, SI, Phil Steele | | ✓ |
| OL | Taliese Fuaga | Oregon State | AFCA, AP, TSN, WCFF, Fox, USAT, SI | | ✓ |
| AP | Travis Hunter | Colorado | CBS, Fox | | |
| C | Jackson Powers-Johnson | Oregon | SI | | |
| WR | Tetairoa McMillan | Arizona | TSN | | |
| OL | Jordan Morgan | Arizona | CBS, Fox | | |
| QB | Bo Nix | Oregon | USAT, SI | | |
| WR | Rome Odunze | Washington | AFCA, WCFF, USAT | | |
| QB | Michael Penix Jr. | Washington | AFCA, AP, FWAA, TSN, CBS, Fox, Phil Steele | | ✓ |
| AP | Sione Vaki | Utah | TSN, SI | | |

| Position | Player | School | Selector | Unanimous | Consensus |
|---|---|---|---|---|---|
Third Team All-Americans
| OL | Troy Fautanu | Washington | AP, Phil Steele | | |
| WR | Tetairoa McMillan | Arizona | AP, Phil Steele | | |
| QB | Bo Nix | Oregon | AP, Phil Steele | | |
| DL | Bralen Trice | Washington | AP | | |
| LB | Edefuan Ulofoshio | Washington | AP, Phil Steele | | |
| AP | Sione Vaki | Utah | Phil Steele | | |
| LS | Simon Samarzich | Washington State | Phil Steele | | |

Fourth Team:

==== List of All American Teams ====
- American Football Coaches Association All-America Team
- Associated Press All-America Team
- CBS Sports All-America Team
- The Athletic All-America Team
- FOX All-America Team
- Sports Illustrated All-America Team
- USA Today All-America Team
- Walter Camp All-America Team
- Writers Association of America All-America Team
- The Sporting News College Football All-America Team
- ESPN All-America Team
- PFF College All-America Team
- Athlon Sports College Football's Postseason All-America Team
- Phil Steele's Postseason All-American Team
- All-American College Football Team and Individual Honors

=== National Awards ===
2023 College Football Award Winners

| Award | Player | School |
|---|---|---|
| Lombardi Award | Laiatu Latu | UCLA |
| Ted Hendricks Award | Laiatu Latu | UCLA |
| Maxwell Award | Michael Penix Jr. | Washington |
| Associated Press Coach of the Year | Kalen DeBoer | Washington |
| Eddie Robinson Coach of the Year Award | Kalen DeBoer | Washington |
| Home Depot Coach of the Year | Kalen DeBoer | Washington |
| Sporting News Coach of the Year | Kalen DeBoer | Washington |
| Walter Camp Coach of the Year | Kalen DeBoer | Washington |
| Joe Moore Award | | Washington |
| Paul Hornung Award | Travis Hunter | Colorado |
| Jon Cornish Trophy | Elic Ayomanor | Stanford |
| Campbell Trophy | Bo Nix | Oregon |
| Rimington Trophy | Jackson Powers-Johnson | Oregon |

== Home game attendance ==
| Team | Stadium | Capacity | Game 1 | Game 2 | Game 3 | Game 4 | Game 5 | Game 6 | Game 7 | Game 8 | Total | Average | % of Capacity |
|---|---|---|---|---|---|---|---|---|---|---|---|---|---|
| Arizona | Arizona Stadium | 50,782 | 48,159 | 44,182 | **50,800**† | 45,023 | 44,956 | **50,800**† | — | — | 283,920 | 47,320 | 93.18% |
| Arizona State | Mountain America Stadium | 53,599 | 47,773† | 42,569 | 46,723 | **54,166**† | **54,086** | 47,284 | 44,741 | 53,414 | 390,756 | 48,845 | 91.12% |
| California | California Memorial Stadium | 63,000 | 44,141† | 36,810 | 34,353 | 34,930 | 43,716 | 38,155 | — | — | 232,105 | 38,684 | 61.40% |
| Colorado | Folsom Field | 50,183 | **53,241** | **53,141** | **54,032**† | **53,154** | **52,725** | **52,788** | — | — | 319,081 | **53,180** | 105.97% |
| Oregon | Autzen Stadium | 54,000 | 45,723 | 52,779 | **59,889** | **58,886** | **54,046** | **59,957** | **59,987**† | — | 391,267 | **55,895** | 103.51% |
| Oregon State | Reser Stadium | 35,548 | **35,728** | **35,591** | **37,372** | **37,600** | **37,107** | **38,415**† | — | — | 221,813 | **36,969** | 104.00% |
| Stanford | Stanford Stadium | 50,424 | 23,848 | 38,046† | 32,160 | 30,225 | 24,380 | **52,971**† | 30,901 | — | 232,531 | 33,219 | 65.87% |
| UCLA | Rose Bowl | 88,565 | 43,705 | 38,343 | 35,437 | 71,343† | 56,436 | 42,439 | — | — | 287,703 | 47,951 | 54.14% |
| USC | Los Angeles Memorial Coliseum | 77,500 | 63,411 | 62,916 | 67,213 | 62,916 | 61,551 | **77,500†** | 72,243† | — | 467,750 | 66,821 | 82.22% |
| Utah | Rice–Eccles Stadium | 51,444 | **53,644** | **51,532** | **52,919** | **52,115** | **53,586**† | **52,104** | **51,595** | — | 367,495 | **52,499** | 102.05% |
| Washington | Husky Stadium | 70,138 | 67,475 | 63,128 | 69,107 | **71,321**† | 68,379 | **70,976** | **71,312** | — | 481,698 | 68,814 | 98.11% |
| Washington State | Martin Stadium | 32,952 | **33,024**† | 23,595 | **33,024**† | 26,155 | 24,385 | 27,869 | — | — | 168,052 | 28,009 | 85.00% |
| **Total** | | 56,511 | | | | | | | | | 3,844,171 | 48,660 | 86.11% |

Bold – At or Exceed capacity
†Season High

== NFL draft ==
The NFL draft will be held at Campus Martius Park in Detroit, MI. The Following list includes all Pac–12 Players in the draft.

=== List of selections ===
| Player | Position | School | Draft Round | Round Pick | Overall Pick | Team |
|---|---|---|---|---|---|---|
| Caleb Williams | QB | USC | 1 | 1 | 1 | Chicago Bears |
| Michael Penix Jr. | QB | Washington | 1 | 8 | 8 | Atlanta Falcons |
| Rome Odunze | WR | Washington | 1 | 9 | 9 | Chicago Bears |
| Bo Nix | QB | Oregon | 1 | 12 | 12 | Denver Broncos |
| Taliese Fuaga | OT | Oregon State | 1 | 14 | 14 | New Orleans Saints |
| Laiatu Latu | EDGE | UCLA | 1 | 15 | 15 | Indianapolis Colts |
| Troy Fautanu | OT | Washington | 1 | 20 | 20 | Pittsburgh Steelers |
| Jordan Morgan | OT | Arizona | 1 | 25 | 25 | Green Bay Packers |
| Ja'Lynn Polk | RB | Washington | 2 | 5 | 37 | New England Patriots |
| Jackson Powers-Johnson | C | Oregon | 2 | 12 | 44 | Las Vegas Raiders |
| Cole Bishop | S | Utah | 2 | 28 | 60 | Las Vegas Raiders |
| Roger Rosengarten | OT | Washington | 2 | 30 | 62 | Baltimore Ravens |
| Bralen Trice | DE | Washington | 3 | 10 | 75 | Atlanta Falcons |
| Jonah Elliss | DE | Utah | 3 | 12 | 76 | Denver Broncos |
| Calen Bullock | S | USC | 3 | 14 | 78 | Houston Texans |
| MarShawn Lloyd | RB | USC | 3 | 24 | 88 | Green Bay Packers |
| Jalen McMillan | WR | Washington | 3 | 28 | 92 | Tampa Bay Buccaneers |
| Troy Franklin | WR | Oregon | 4 | 2 | 102 | Denver Broncos |
| Khyree Jackson | CB | Oregon | 4 | 8 | 108 | Minnesota Vikings |
| Brandon Dorlus | DT | Oregon | 4 | 9 | 109 | Atlanta Falcons |
| Evan Williams | S | Oregon | 4 | 11 | 111 | Green Bay Packers |
| Bucky Irving | RB | Oregon | 4 | 25 | 125 | Tampa Bay Buccaneers |
| Sione Vaki | S | Oregon | 4 | 32 | 132 | Detroit Lions |
| Jaden Hicks | S | Washington State | 4 | 26 | 126 | Kansas City Chiefs |
| Jacob Cowing | WR | Arizona | 4 | 35 | 135 | San Francisco 49ers |
| Anthony Gould | WR | Oregon State | 5 | 7 | 142 | Indianapolis Colts |
| Brennan Jackson | DE | Washington State | 5 | 19 | 154 | Los Angeles Rams |
| Chau Smith-Wade | CB | Washington State | 5 | 22 | 157 | Carolina Panthers |
| Edefuan Ulofoshio | LB | Washington | 5 | 25 | 160 | Buffalo Bills |
| Dominique Hampton | S | Washington | 5 | 26 | 161 | Carolina Panthers |
| Kitan Oladapo | S | Oregon State | 5 | 34 | 169 | Carolina Panthers |
| Sataoa Laumea | OG | Utah | 6 | 3 | 179 | Seattle Seahawks |
| Darius Muasau | LB | UCLA | 6 | 7 | 183 | New York Giants |
| Jamal Hill | LB | Oregon | 6 | 12 | 188 | Houston Texans |
| Tanner McLachlan | TE | Arizona | 6 | 18 | 194 | Cincinnati Bengals |
| Patrick McMorris | S | California | 6 | 22 | 198 | Miami Dolphins |
| Joshua Karty | K | Stanford | 6 | 33 | 209 | Los Angeles Rams |
| Jarrett Kingston | OG | USC | 6 | 39 | 215 | San Francisco 49ers |
| Brenden Rice | WR | USC | 7 | 5 | 225 | Los Angeles Chargers |
| Devaughn Vele | WR | Utah | 7 | 15 | 235 | Denver Broncos |
| Solomon Byrd | DE | USC | 7 | 18 | 238 | Houston Texans |
| Tahj Washington | WR | USC | 7 | 21 | 241 | Miami Dolphins |
| Devin Culp | WR | Washington | 7 | 26 | 246 | Tampa Bay Buccaneers |

=== Total picks by school ===
| Team | Round 1 | Round 2 | Round 3 | Round 4 | Round 5 | Round 6 | Round 7 | Total |
|---|---|---|---|---|---|---|---|---|
| Arizona | 1 | 0 | 0 | 1 | 0 | 1 | 0 | 3 |
| Arizona State | 0 | 0 | 0 | 0 | 0 | 0 | 0 | 0 |
| California | 0 | 0 | 0 | 0 | 0 | 1 | 0 | 1 |
| Colorado | 0 | 0 | 0 | 0 | 0 | 0 | 0 | 0 |
| Oregon | 1 | 1 | 0 | 5 | 0 | 1 | 0 | 8 |
| Oregon State | 1 | 0 | 0 | 0 | 2 | 0 | 0 | 3 |
| Stanford | 0 | 0 | 0 | 0 | 0 | 1 | 0 | 1 |
| UCLA | 1 | 0 | 0 | 0 | 0 | 1 | 0 | 2 |
| USC | 1 | 0 | 2 | 0 | 0 | 1 | 3 | 7 |
| Utah | 0 | 1 | 1 | 1 | 0 | 1 | 1 | 5 |
| Washington | 3 | 2 | 2 | 0 | 2 | 0 | 1 | 10 |
| Washington State | 0 | 0 | 0 | 1 | 2 | 0 | 0 | 3 |
| Total | 8 | 4 | 5 | 8 | 6 | 7 | 5 | 43 |
