= Brandon Dorlus =

American football player (born 2001)

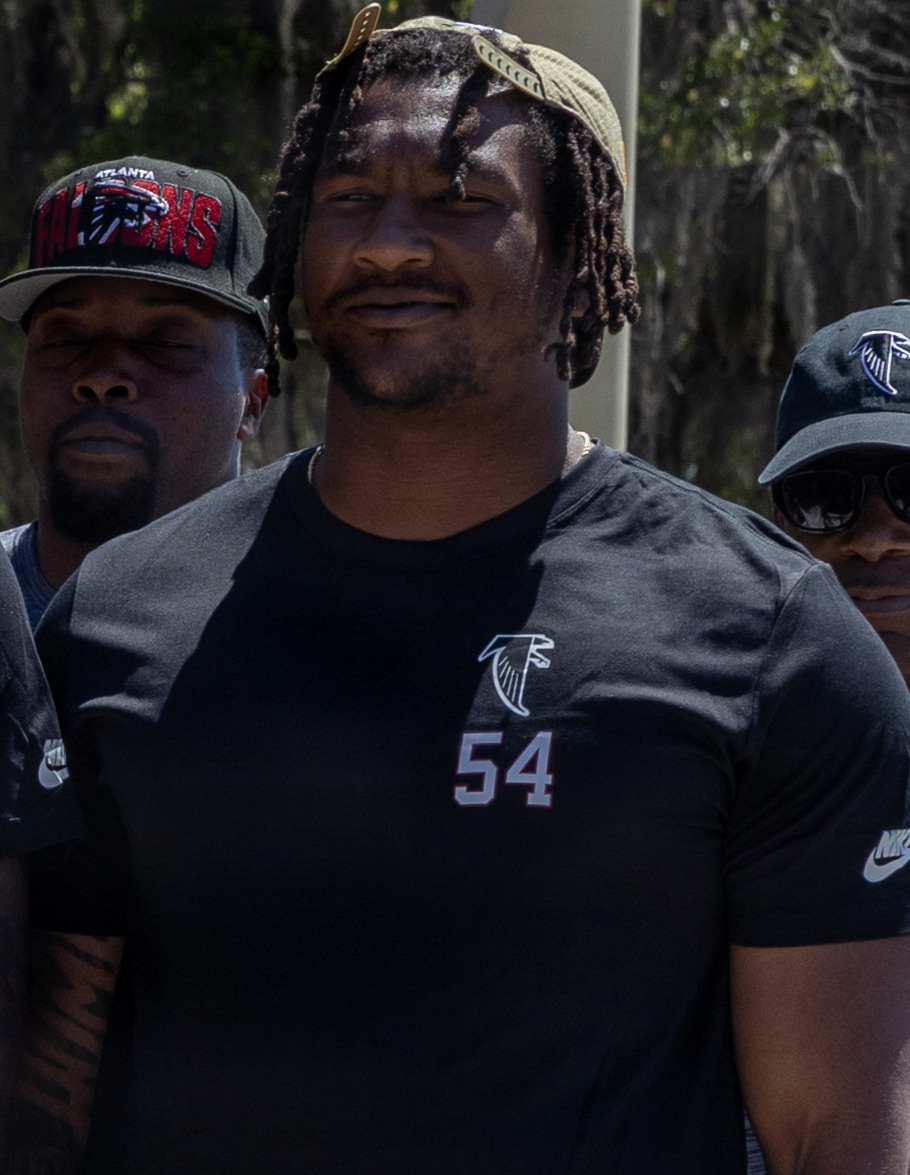
- Dorlus in 2026

No. 54 – Atlanta Falcons
- Position: Defensive end
- Roster status: Active

Personal information
- Born: March 22, 2001 (age 25); Fort Lauderdale, Florida, U.S.
- Listed height: 6 ft 3 in (1.91 m)
- Listed weight: 295 lb (134 kg)

Career information
- High school: Deerfield Beach (Deerfield Beach, Florida)
- College: Oregon (2019–2023)
- NFL draft: 2024: 4th round, 109th overall pick

Career history
- Atlanta Falcons (2024–present)

Awards and highlights
- 2× First-team All-Pac-12 (2021, 2023); Second-team All-Pac-12 (2022)

Career NFL statistics as of Week 5, 2026
- Total tackles: 30
- Sacks: 8.5
- Stats at Pro Football Reference

Brandon Dorlus (born March 22, 2001) is an American professional football defensive end for the Atlanta Falcons of the National Football League (NFL). He played college football for the Oregon Ducks.

== Early life ==
Dorlus originally attended Calvary Christian High School in Fort Lauderdale, Florida before transferring to Deerfield Beach High School in Deerfield Beach, Florida. As a senior, he had 74 tackles, 11 sacks and an interception that he returned for a touchdown. He originally committed to Virginia Tech to play college football before changing to the University of Oregon.

== College career ==
Dorlus played in nine games as a true freshman at Oregon in 2019, recording five tackles and one sack. In 2020, he played in all seven games with one start and had 14 tackles and one sack. Dorlus became a starter in 2021, starting 13 of 14 games and finishing with 25 tackles and 2.5 sacks. He returned to Oregon as a starter in 2022.

== Professional career ==
Pre-draft measurables
| Height | Weight | Arm length | Hand span | Wingspan | 40-yard dash | 10-yard split | 20-yard split | 20-yard shuttle | Three-cone drill | Vertical jump | Broad jump |
|---|---|---|---|---|---|---|---|---|---|---|---|
| 6 ft 3 in (1.91 m) | 283 lb (128 kg) | 33 1/4 in (0.84 m) | 9 3/8 in (0.24 m) | 6 ft 8 7/8 in (2.05 m) | 4.85 s | 1.68 s | 2.79 s | 4.85 s | 7.43 s | 30.5 in (0.77 m) | 9 ft 3 in (2.82 m) |
All values from NFL Combine

Dorlus was selected by the Atlanta Falcons with the 109th overall pick in the fourth round of the 2024 NFL draft.

== NFL career statistics ==
Legend
| **Bold** | Career high |

=== Regular season ===
| Year | Team | Games | | Tackles | | | | | Fumbles | |
| Year | Team | GP | GS | Cmb | Solo | Ast | Sck | TfL | FF | FR |
|---|---|---|---|---|---|---|---|---|---|---|
| 2024 | ATL | 2 | 0 | 3 | 1 | 2 | 0 | 0 | 0 | 0 |
| 2025 | ATL | 15 | 9 | **27** | **15** | **12** | **8.5** | **11** | 0 | 0 |
| 2026 | ATL | 5 | 5 | 7 | 4 | 3 | 0 | 0 | 0 | 0 |
| Career | | 22 | 14 | 37 | 20 | 17 | 8.5 | 11 | 0 | 0 |
