= Bralen Trice =

American football player (born 2001)

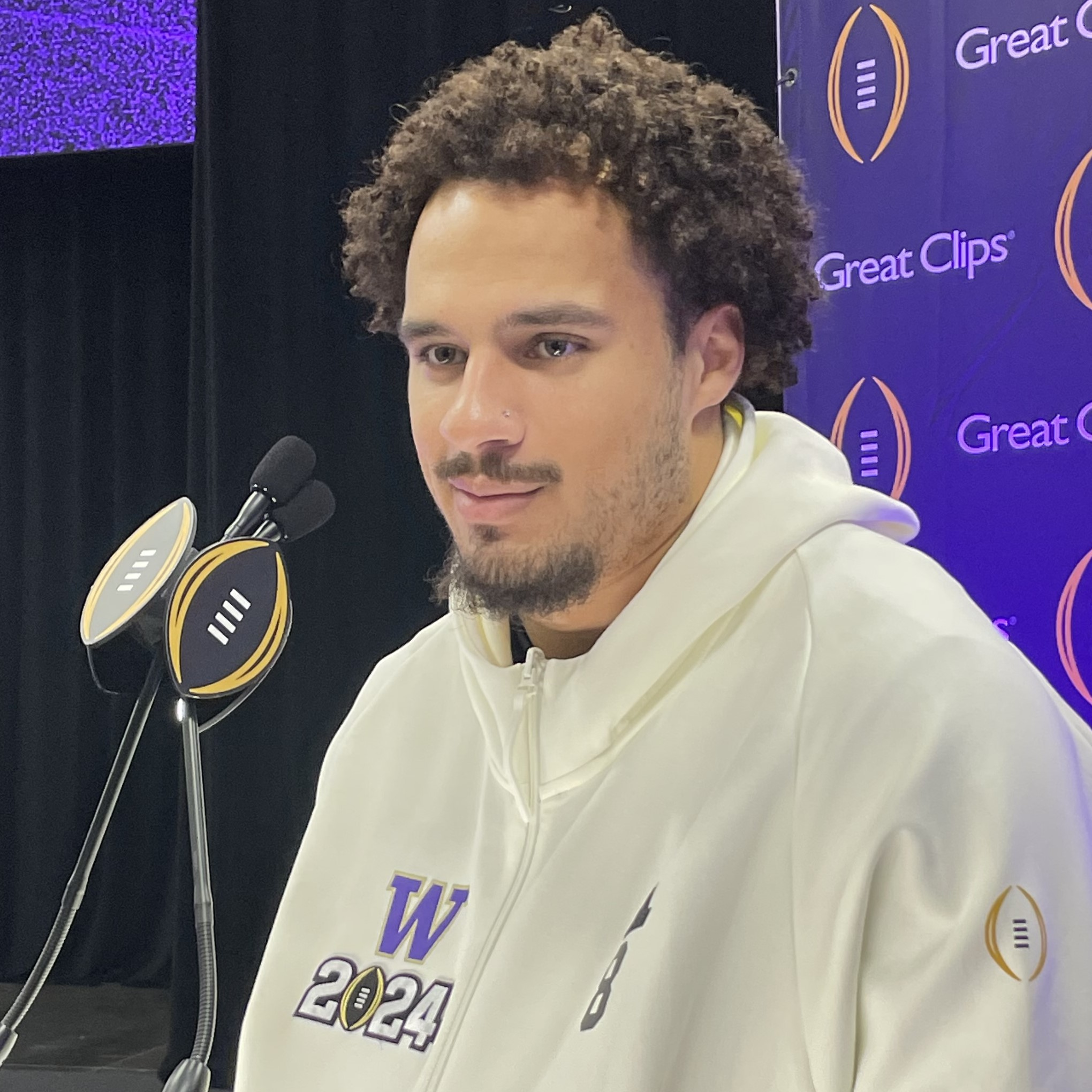
- Trice in 2024

No. 54 – Dallas Cowboys
- Position: Defensive end
- Roster status: Practice squad

Personal information
- Born: February 26, 2001 (age 25); Phoenix, Arizona, U.S.
- Listed height: 6 ft 4 in (1.93 m)
- Listed weight: 274 lb (124 kg)

Career information
- High school: Sandra Day O'Connor (Phoenix)
- College: Washington (2020–2023)
- NFL draft: 2024: 3rd round, 74th overall pick

Career history
- Atlanta Falcons (2024–2026); Las Vegas Raiders (2026)*; Dallas Cowboys (2026–present)*
- * Offseason or practice squad member only

Awards and highlights
- 2× first-team All-Pac-12 (2022, 2023)
- Stats at Pro Football Reference

Bralen Trice (born February 26, 2001) is an American professional football defensive end for the Dallas Cowboys of the National Football League (NFL). He played college football for the Washington Huskies. Trice was drafted in the third round of the 2024 NFL draft by the Atlanta Falcons.

== Early life ==
Trice attended Sandra Day O'Connor High School in Phoenix, Arizona. During his high school career he had 16.5 sacks. He committed to the University of Washington to play college football.

== College career ==
Trice redshirted his first year at Washington in 2019 and opted out of the 2020 season due to the COVID-19 pandemic. He returned in 2021 to play in all 12 games and made two starts. He finished the year with 14 tackles, two sacks and a touchdown via a fumble return. Trice was named the defensive MVP of the 2022 Alamo Bowl.

== Professional career ==
Pre-draft measurables
Height	Weight	Arm length	Hand span	Wingspan	40-yard dash	10-yard split	20-yard split	20-yard shuttle	Three-cone drill	Vertical jump	Broad jump	Bench press
6 ft 3 1/2 in (1.92 m)	245 lb (111 kg)	32 1/2 in (0.83 m)	9 in (0.23 m)	6 ft 5 5/8 in (1.97 m)	4.72 s	1.65 s	2.74 s	4.19 s	7.20 s	32.0 in (0.81 m)	9 ft 7 in (2.92 m)	20 reps
All values from NFL Combine/Pro Day

=== Atlanta Falcons ===
Trice was selected by the Atlanta Falcons in the third round, 74th overall, of the 2024 NFL draft. He tore his ACL in the first preseason game and was placed on season-ending injured reserve on August 11, 2024.

Trice began the 2025 season on injured reserve after aggravating the same knee injury from 2024.

On August 30, 2026, Trice was waived by the Falcons as a part of final roster cuts. On September 4, Trice was re–signed to Atlanta's practice squad. On October 17, he was signed to the active roster and released three days later.

=== Las Vegas Raiders ===
On October 28, 2026, Trice signed with the Las Vegas Raiders' practice squad. He was waived on November 16.

=== Dallas Cowboys ===
On November 19, 2026, Trice signed with the Dallas Cowboys practice squad.
