= Jabbar Muhammad =

American football player (born 2001)

No. 37 – Jacksonville Jaguars
- Position: Cornerback
- Roster status: Practice squad

Personal information
- Born: December 28, 2001 (age 24); DeSoto, Texas, U.S.
- Listed height: 5 ft 10 in (1.78 m)
- Listed weight: 185 lb (84 kg)

Career information
- High school: DeSoto (TX)
- College: Oklahoma State (2020–2022); Washington (2023); Oregon (2024)
- NFL draft: 2025: undrafted

Career history
- Jacksonville Jaguars (2025–present)

Awards and highlights
- Second-team All-Big Ten (2024); Second-team All-Pac-12 (2023)

Career NFL statistics as of Week 4, 2026
- Games played: 1
- Stats at Pro Football Reference

Jabbar Azim Muhammad (born December 28, 2001) is an American professional football cornerback for the Jacksonville Jaguars of the National Football League (NFL). He played college football for the Oklahoma State Cowboys, Washington Huskies, and Oregon Ducks.

== Early life ==
Muhammad attended DeSoto High School in DeSoto, Texas. He committed to Oklahoma State University to play college football.

== College career ==
Muhammad played at Oklahoma State from 2020 to 2022. As a freshman in 2020, he played in five games and had one tackle. As a sophomore in 2021, he played in all 14 games with one start and recorded 23 tackles. In 2022, Muhammad started all 12 games and had 48 tackles and one interception. After the season, he entered the transfer portal and transferred to the University of Washington. Muhammad was a starter his first year at Washington in 2023.

On January 12, 2024, Muhammad announced that he would be entering the transfer portal for the second time. On January 27, he announced that he would transfer to Oregon.

== Professional career ==
Pre-draft measurables
Height	Weight	Arm length	Hand span	Wingspan	40-yard dash	10-yard split	20-yard split	20-yard shuttle	Three-cone drill	Vertical jump	Bench press
5 ft 9 1/8 in (1.76 m)	182 lb (83 kg)	28 5/8 in (0.73 m)	9 in (0.23 m)	5 ft 11 3/8 in (1.81 m)	4.54 s	1.58 s	2.65 s	4.19 s	7.01 s	31.5 in (0.80 m)	13 reps
All values from NFL Combine/Pro Day

On April 27, 2025, Muhammad signed with the Jacksonville Jaguars as an undrafted free agent. He was waived on August 26, as a part of final roster cuts. Muhammad was re-signed to the team's practice squad the following day. He signed a reserve/future contract with Jacksonville on January 12, 2026.

On August 30, 2026, Muhammad was waived by the Jaguars as a part of final roster cuts; he was re-signed to the team's practice squad the next day.
