= Gerad Christian-Lichtenhan =

American football player (born 2001)

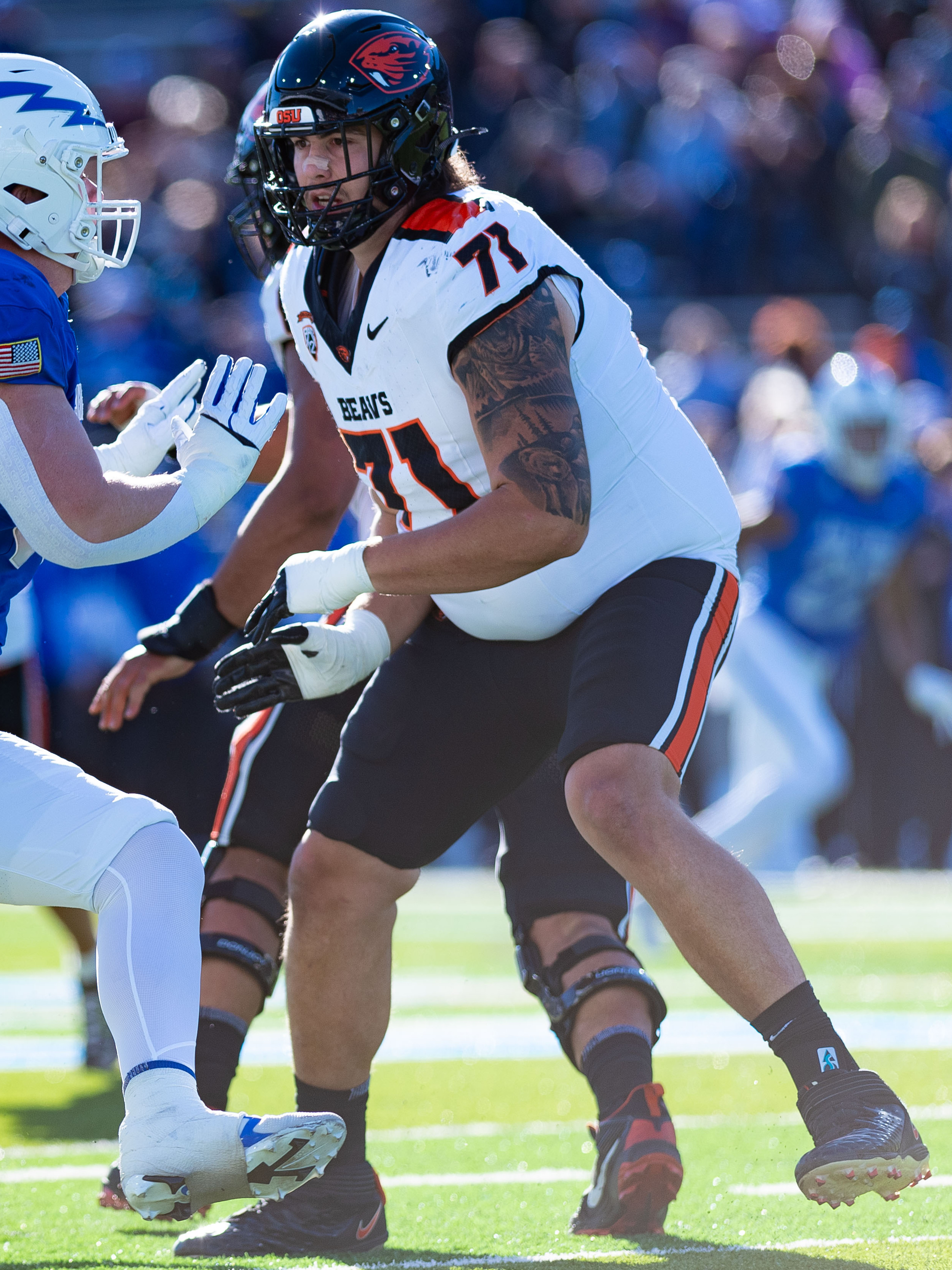
- Christian-Lichtenhan with Oregon State in 2024

No. 78 – Baltimore Ravens
- Position: Offensive tackle
- Roster status: Practice squad/injured

Personal information
- Born: December 3, 2001 (age 24); Fremont, California, U.S.
- Listed height: 6 ft 8 in (2.03 m)
- Listed weight: 330 lb (150 kg)

Career information
- High school: Davis Senior (Davis, California)
- College: Colorado (2020–2023); Oregon State (2024)
- NFL draft: 2025: undrafted

Career history
- Baltimore Ravens (2025–present)

Awards and highlights
- Pac-12 Offensive Line Top Performer (2024)
- Stats at Pro Football Reference

Gerad Christian-Lichtenhan (born December 3, 2001) is an American professional football offensive tackle for the Baltimore Ravens of the National Football League (NFL). He played college football for the Colorado Buffaloes and Oregon State Beavers.

== Early life ==
Christian-Lichtenhan attended Davis Senior High School in Davis, California. He was rated as a three-star recruit in the class of 2020 and committed to play college football for the Colorado Buffaloes.

== College career ==
=== Colorado ===
After redshirting the 2020 season, Christian-Lichtenhan appeared in all 12 games for the Buffaloes in 2021, mostly on special teams duty. He appeared in nine games in 2022, making eight starts. During the 2023 season, Christian-Lichtenhan appeared in all 12 games, starting 11 games for the Buffaloes, earning Pac-12 Conference Offensive Lineman of the Week honors during a week 2 matchup versus Nebraska. After the 2023 season, he entered his name into the NCAA transfer portal.

=== Oregon State ===
Christian-Lichtenhan transferred to play for Oregon State. He started all 12 games in his first season with the Beavers in 2024, and was named the Pac-12 Offensive Lineman of the Year. After the season, Christian-Lichtenhan accepted an invite to play in the 2025 East–West Shrine Bowl, with his teammate Joshua Gray.

== Professional career ==
Pre-draft measurables
Height	Weight	Arm length	Hand span	Wingspan	40-yard dash	10-yard split	20-yard split	20-yard shuttle	Three-cone drill	Vertical jump	Broad jump	Bench press
6 ft 8 1/4 in (2.04 m)	315 lb (143 kg)	35 1/4 in (0.90 m)	10 in (0.25 m)	7 ft 1 3/8 in (2.17 m)	5.37 s	1.85 s	3.13 s	5.08 s	7.87 s	28.0 in (0.71 m)	9 ft 1 in (2.77 m)	19 reps
All values from Pro Day

Christian-Lichtenhan signed with the Baltimore Ravens as an undrafted free agent on May 4, 2025. He was waived on August 26, as part of final roster cuts, and re-signed to the practice squad. Christian-Lichtenhan signed a reserve/future contract with Baltimore on January 5, 2026.

On August 30, 2026, Christian-Lichtenhan was waived by the Ravens as a part of final roster cuts; he was re-signed to the team's practice squad the next day.
