= Easton Mascarenas-Arnold =

American football linebacker

No. 42 – Cleveland Browns
- Position: Linebacker
- Roster status: Active

Personal information
- Born: September 13, 2002 (age 24); Mission Viejo, California, U.S.
- Listed height: 5 ft 11 in (1.80 m)
- Listed weight: 227 lb (103 kg)

Career information
- High school: Mission Viejo (CA)
- College: Oregon State (2021–2023); USC (2024)
- NFL draft: 2025: undrafted

Career history
- Cleveland Browns (2025–present)

Awards and highlights
- First-team All-Pac-12 (2023)

Career NFL statistics as of Week 9, 2025
- Total tackles: 5
- Stats at Pro Football Reference

Easton Mascarenas-Arnold (born September 13, 2002) is an American professional football linebacker for the Cleveland Browns of the National Football League (NFL). He played college football for the Oregon State Beavers and USC Trojans.

== Early life ==
Mascarenas-Arnold attended Mission Viejo High School in Mission Viejo, California. He was rated as a four-star recruit and committed to play college football for the Oregon State Beavers over other offers such as Arizona, Arizona State, Boise State, Colorado, Washington, and Washington State.

== College career ==
=== Oregon State ===
As a freshman in 2021, Mascarenas-Arnold totaled 15 tackles and a pass deflection. In the 2022 season, he notched 37 tackles with five and a half being for a loss, two sacks, a pass deflection, an interception, and a touchdown in 12 games. In 2023, Mascarenas-Arnold recorded a team-high 107 tackles with six and a half being for a loss, two sacks, and two interceptions. After the season, he entered his name into the NCAA transfer portal.

=== USC ===
Mascarenas-Arnold transferred to play for the USC Trojans. In the 2024 season opener, he notched six tackles in a victory over LSU. Mascarenas-Arnold logged a career-best 14 tackles in a loss to Minnesota in week 6 before recording eight tackles in a 28–20 win versus Nebraska in week 12. He finished the 2024 season with 95 tackles (five for a loss), three sacks, two interceptions and a fumble recovery.

== Professional career ==
Pre-draft measurables
Height	Weight	Arm length	Hand span	Wingspan	40-yard dash	10-yard split	20-yard split	20-yard shuttle	Three-cone drill	Vertical jump	Broad jump	Bench press
5 ft 11 1/8 in (1.81 m)	227 lb (103 kg)	30 3/8 in (0.77 m)	9 3/8 in (0.24 m)	6 ft 1 7/8 in (1.88 m)	4.58 s	1.59 s	2.80 s	4.34 s	6.85 s	32.0 in (0.81 m)	10 ft 0 in (3.05 m)	25 reps
All values from Pro Day

After not being selected in the 2025 NFL draft, Mascarenas-Arnold signed with the Cleveland Browns as an undrafted free agent.

== Personal life ==
Mascarenas-Arnold is the son of former All-American softball third baseman Toni Arnold and the stepbrother of former USC and Oregon State safety Akili Arnold.
