= Taliese Fuaga =

American football player (born 2002)

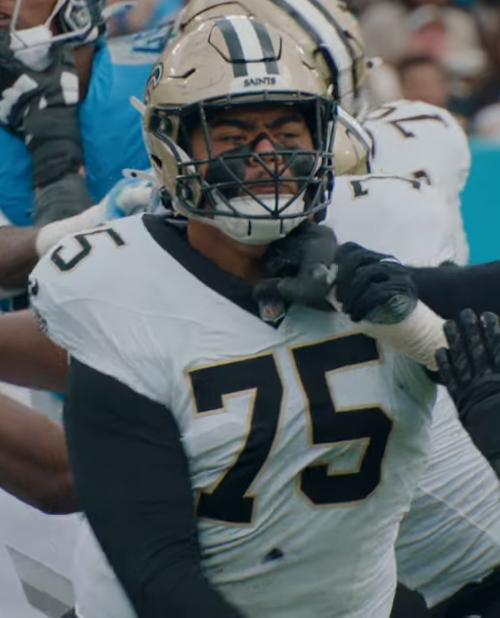
- Fuaga in 2025

No. 75 – New Orleans Saints
- Position: Offensive tackle
- Roster status: Active

Personal information
- Born: April 5, 2002 (age 24); Tacoma, Washington, U.S.
- Listed height: 6 ft 6 in (1.98 m)
- Listed weight: 324 lb (147 kg)

Career information
- High school: Mount Tahoma (Tacoma)
- College: Oregon State (2020–2023)
- NFL draft: 2024: 1st round, 14th overall pick

Career history
- New Orleans Saints (2024–present)

Awards and highlights
- First-team All-American (2023); First-team All-Pac-12 (2023); Second-team All-Pac-12 (2022)

Career NFL statistics as of Week 7, 2026
- Games played: 37
- Games started: 37
- Stats at Pro Football Reference

Taliese Fuaga (tah-lee-ESS-ay foo-ANG-uh; born April 5, 2002) is an American professional football offensive tackle for the New Orleans Saints of the National Football League (NFL). He played college football for the Oregon State Beavers, receiving All-American honors in 2023. Fuaga was selected by the Saints in the first round of the 2024 NFL draft.

== Early life ==
Fuaga attended Mount Tahoma High School in Tacoma, Washington. He played offensive and defensive line in high school. He was selected to play in the 2020 Polynesian Bowl. Fuaga committed to Oregon State University to play college football, turning down similar offers from Oregon, USC, Hawaii, and Nevada.

== College career ==
Fuaga played in 14 games as a backup his first years at Oregon State in 2020 and 2021. He started all 13 games in 2022 and returned as a starter in 2023, where he was named a first-team All-American.

== Professional career ==
Pre-draft measurables
Height	Weight	Arm length	Hand span	Wingspan	40-yard dash	10-yard split	20-yard split	Vertical jump	Broad jump
6 ft 5 3/4 in (1.97 m)	324 lb (147 kg)	33 1/8 in (0.84 m)	10 1/8 in (0.26 m)	6 ft 8 5/8 in (2.05 m)	5.13 s	1.77 s	2.98 s	32.0 in (0.81 m)	9 ft 3 in (2.82 m)
All values from NFL Combine

Fuaga was selected by the New Orleans Saints in the first round with the 14th overall pick in the 2024 NFL draft. He started in all 17 games as a rookie.

== NFL career statistics ==
Legend
	No type penalty
**Bold**	Career high

=== Regular season ===
Year	Team	Games		Offense					
Year	Team	GP	GS	Snaps	Pct	Holding	False Start	Decl/Pen	Acpt/Pen
2024	NO	**17**	**17**	**1,071**	**98%**	**2**	**4**	0	**11**
2025	NO	13	13	814	96%	**2**	3	2	6
Career		30	30	1,885	-	4	7	2	17
