= Junior Tafuna =

American football player (born 2001)

Profile
- Position: Defensive tackle

Personal information
- Born: February 27, 2001 (age 25); Taylorsville, Utah, U.S.
- Listed height: 6 ft 3 in (1.91 m)
- Listed weight: 305 lb (138 kg)

Career information
- High school: Bingham (South Jordan, Utah)
- College: Utah (2020–2024)
- NFL draft: 2025: undrafted

Career history
- Houston Texans (2025)*; New York Jets (2026)*; Houston Texans (2026)*
- * Offseason or practice squad member only

Awards and highlights
- 3× Second-team All-Pac-12 (2021, 2022, 2023); Pac-12 Defensive Freshman of the Year (2021)
- Stats at Pro Football Reference

Timote "Junior" Maile Tafuna (born February 27, 2001) is an American professional football defensive tackle. He played college football for the Utah Utes.

== Early life ==
Tafuna attended Bingham High School in South Jordan, Utah. He was rated as a three-star recruit and committed to play college football for the Utah Utes.

== College career ==
Tafuna did not appear in any games for the Utes in 2020. In week 11 of the 2021 season, he notched a career-high nine tackles in a win over Arizona. In 2021, Tafuna totaled 33 tackles with five and a half being for a loss, four and a half sacks, a fumble recovery, and a pass deflection. He was named the Pac-12 Conference defensive freshman of the year and was named second-team all-Pac-12. In 2022, Tafuna started all 14 games, notching 27 tackles with three and a half being for a loss, a sack, an interception, and a pass deflection, while once again being named second-team all-Pac-12. In week 10 of the 2023 season, he recorded his first career forced fumble, which he also recovered against Oregon. Tafuna finished the year with 17 tackles with three being for a loss, a sack and a half, two pass deflections, a forced fumble, and a fumble recovery.

== Professional career ==
Pre-draft measurables
Height	Weight	Arm length	Hand span	Wingspan	40-yard dash	10-yard split	20-yard split	20-yard shuttle	Three-cone drill	Vertical jump	Broad jump	Bench press
6 ft 3 1/2 in (1.92 m)	308 lb (140 kg)	32 1/2 in (0.83 m)	10 1/2 in (0.27 m)	6 ft 6 3/4 in (2.00 m)	5.03 s	1.80 s	2.95 s	4.62 s	7.51 s	29.0 in (0.74 m)	8 ft 3 in (2.51 m)	24 reps
All values from NFL Combine/Pro Day

=== Houston Texans (first stint) ===
Tafuna was signed by the Houston Texans as an undrafted free agent on May 9, 2025. He was waived on August 26 as part of final roster cuts, and re-signed to the practice squad. On January 20, 2026, Tafuna signed a reserve/futures contract with Houston.

On August 5, 2026, Tafuna was waived by the Texans.

=== New York Jets ===
On August 6, 2026, Tafuna was claimed off waivers by the New York Jets. He was waived by New York during final roster cuts on August 30.

=== Houston Texans (second stint) ===
On September 2, 2026, Tafuna was signed to the Houston Texans' practice squad. He was released on November 17.
