= Sataoa Laumea =

American football player (born 2001)

Profile
- Position: Guard

Personal information
- Born: January 13, 2001 (age 25); Compton, California, U.S.
- Listed height: 6 ft 4 in (1.93 m)
- Listed weight: 319 lb (145 kg)

Career information
- High school: Eisenhower (Rialto)
- College: Utah (2019–2023)
- NFL draft: 2024: 6th round, 179th overall pick

Career history
- Seattle Seahawks (2024–2025); New Orleans Saints (2025)*; Pittsburgh Steelers (2026)*
- * Offseason or practice squad member only

Awards and highlights
- First-team All-Pac-12 (2022); 2× Second-team All-Pac-12 (2020, 2023)

Career NFL statistics as of 2024
- Games played: 6
- Games started: 6
- Stats at Pro Football Reference

Sataoa Laumea (born January 13, 2001) is an American professional football guard. He played college football for the Utah Utes.

== Early life ==
One of ten children, Laumea was born and raised in Compton, California before his family uprooted to Rialto, California when he was 10-years-old. He attended Eisenhower High School where he played football and competed in track and field. He played as a two-way lineman for Eisenhower and was named first-team All-Citrus Belt League, first-team all-area and the All-CIF Southern Section Division 10 Offensive Player of the Year. A highly-recruited prospect, he played in the Polynesian Bowl and was ranked a four-star recruit, committing to play college football for the Utah Utes.

== College career ==
As a true freshman at Utah in 2019, Laumea redshirted and appeared in one game. He then started all five games as a right guard in the COVID-19-shortened 2020 season and was chosen second-team All-Pac-12 Conference. He started 13 games at the position in 2021 and earned honorable mention All-Pac 12 honors. He started 14 games, 13 at right tackle, in 2022, being named first-team all-conference while helping the team have the second-best rushing offense in the Pac-12. He returned in 2023 and received a second-team all-conference selection, his fourth time on the Pac-12 all-star team. Although Laumea had an extra year of eligibility remaining, he entered the 2024 NFL draft by accepting an invitation to the 2024 Senior Bowl, finishing his collegiate career having recorded 38 consecutive starts.

== Professional career ==
Pre-draft measurables
| Height | Weight | Arm length | Hand span | Wingspan | Vertical jump | Broad jump | Bench press |
|---|---|---|---|---|---|---|---|
| 6 ft 4 1/4 in (1.94 m) | 319 lb (145 kg) | 32 7/8 in (0.84 m) | 9 7/8 in (0.25 m) | 6 ft 8 3/4 in (2.05 m) | 26.0 in (0.66 m) | 8 ft 8 in (2.64 m) | 26 reps |
All values from NFL Combine

=== Seattle Seahawks ===
Laumea was selected by the Seattle Seahawks in the sixth round (179th overall) of the 2024 NFL draft.

In the 2024 season, he started six games at right guard in place of an injured Anthony Bradford.

On August 26, 2025, Laumea was waived by the Seahawks as part of final roster cuts and re-signed to the practice squad the following day. On September 1, he was released and re-signed to the practice squad the following day, then released the day after.

=== New Orleans Saints ===
On September 17, 2025, Laumea signed with the New Orleans Saints' practice squad. He was released by the Saints on October 7.

=== Pittsburgh Steelers ===
On January 19, 2026, Laumea signed a reserve/futures contract with the Pittsburgh Steelers. He was waived by Pittsburgh on May 11.
