= Jackson Powers-Johnson =

American football player (born 2003)

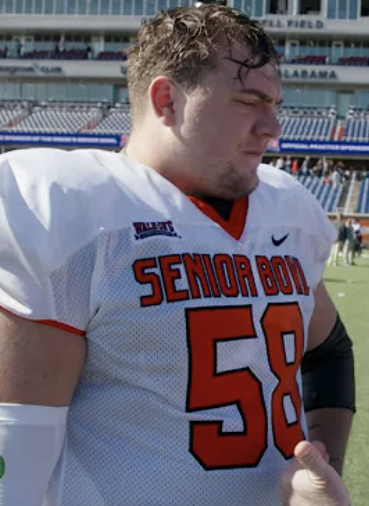
- Powers at the 2024 Senior Bowl

No. 58 – Las Vegas Raiders
- Position: Guard
- Roster status: Active

Personal information
- Born: January 23, 2003 (age 23); Draper, Utah, U.S.
- Listed height: 6 ft 3 in (1.91 m)
- Listed weight: 325 lb (147 kg)

Career information
- High school: Corner Canyon (Draper)
- College: Oregon (2021–2023)
- NFL draft: 2024: 2nd round, 44th overall pick

Career history
- Las Vegas Raiders (2024–present)

Awards and highlights
- PFWA All-Rookie Team (2024); Rimington Trophy (2023); Unanimous All-American (2023); First-team All-Pac-12 (2023)

Career NFL statistics as of Week 5, 2026
- Games played: 27
- Games started: 25
- Stats at Pro Football Reference

Jackson James Powers-Johnson (born January 23, 2003) is an American professional football guard for the Las Vegas Raiders of the National Football League (NFL). He played college football for the Oregon Ducks, winning the 2023 Rimington Trophy as the top center. Powers-Johnson was selected by the Raiders in the second round of the 2024 NFL draft.

== Early life ==
Powers-Johnson was born on January 23, 2003. He attended Corner Canyon High School in Draper, Utah where he played on both the offensive and defensive line. During his career he had 124 tackles, 7.5 sacks and two interceptions. He was selected to play in the 2021 Under Armour All-America Game and 2021 Polynesian Bowl. Powers-Johnson committed to the University of Oregon to play college football.

== College career ==
As a true freshman at Oregon in 2021, Powers-Johnson played in 11 games as a backup offensive lineman before switching to the defensive line for the 2021 Alamo Bowl. He returned to the offensive line in 2022 and appeared in 12 games with one start. Powers-Johnson took over as the starting center in 2023.

== Professional career ==
Pre-draft measurables
Height	Weight	Arm length	Hand span	Wingspan	Vertical jump	Broad jump	Bench press
6 ft 3 3/8 in (1.91 m)	328 lb (149 kg)	32 1/4 in (0.82 m)	9 7/8 in (0.25 m)	6 ft 6 1/2 in (1.99 m)	32.0 in (0.81 m)	8 ft 8 in (2.64 m)	30 reps
All values from NFL Combine

Powers-Johnson was selected in the second round with the 44th overall pick of the 2024 NFL Draft by the Las Vegas Raiders. He made his NFL debut in Week 3 against the Carolina Panthers. Powers-Johnson made his first start the following week against the Cleveland Browns. He appeared in 15 games and started 14 as a rookie. Powers-Johnson was named to the PFWA All-Rookie Team.

Powers-Johnson began the 2025 campaign as the Raiders' Right Guard, starting seven out of his eight appearances before suffering an ankle injury in Week 10 against the Denver Broncos. He was placed on injured reserve on November 11, 2025.
