= Joshua Gray =

American football player (born 2000)

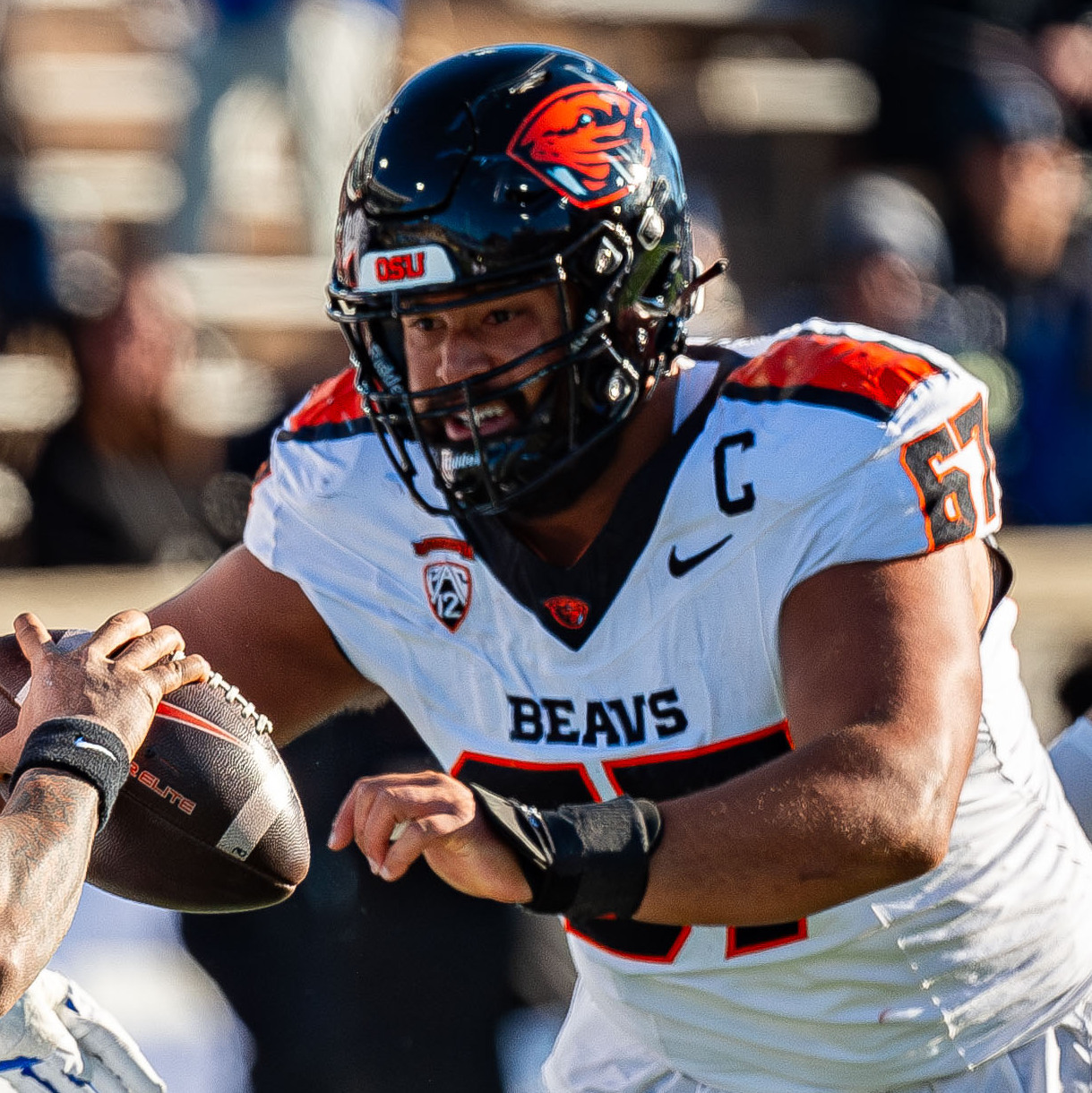
- Gray with Oregon State in 2024

No. 66 – Indianapolis Colts
- Position: Guard
- Roster status: Practice squad

Personal information
- Born: March 13, 2000 (age 26); Rancho Cucamonga, California, U.S.
- Listed height: 6 ft 5 in (1.96 m)
- Listed weight: 299 lb (136 kg)

Career information
- High school: Rancho Cucamonga
- College: Oregon State (2019–2024)
- NFL draft: 2025: undrafted

Career history
- Atlanta Falcons (2025)*; Carolina Panthers (2026)*; Minnesota Vikings (2026)*; Indianapolis Colts (2026–present)*
- * Offseason or practice squad member only

Awards and highlights
- 3× Second-team All-Pac-12 (2020, 2022, 2023)
- Stats at Pro Football Reference

Joshua Gray (born March 13, 2000) is an American professional football guard for the Indianapolis Colts of the National Football League (NFL). He played college football for the Oregon State Beavers.

== Early life ==
Gray attended Rancho Cucamonga High School in Rancho Cucamonga, California. A three-star recruit, Gray committed to play college football at Oregon State University over offers from Arizona, Nebraska, and Washington State.

== College career ==
After being redshirted in 2019, Gray started 44 games as a left tackle over the course of four years before switching positions. During the 2023 season, in a game against San Diego State, Gray scored his first career touchdown, a three-yard touchdown run. Following the conclusion of the 2023 season, Gray announced that he would return to Oregon State for a sixth and final season.

== Professional career ==
Pre-draft measurables
| Height | Weight | Arm length | Hand span | Wingspan | 40-yard dash | 10-yard split | 20-yard split | 20-yard shuttle | Three-cone drill | Vertical jump | Broad jump | Bench press |
|---|---|---|---|---|---|---|---|---|---|---|---|---|
| 6 ft 5 1/8 in (1.96 m) | 299 lb (136 kg) | 31 3/8 in (0.80 m) | 9 1/2 in (0.24 m) | 6 ft 6 5/8 in (2.00 m) | 5.04 s | 1.73 s | 2.88 s | 4.65 s | 7.57 s | 31.0 in (0.79 m) | 8 ft 8 in (2.64 m) | 18 reps |
All values from NFL Combine/Pro Day

=== Atlanta Falcons ===
After going unselected in the 2025 NFL draft, Gray signed with the Atlanta Falcons as an undrafted free agent on April 28, 2025. He was waived on August 26 as part of final roster cuts and re-signed to the practice squad the next day.

=== Carolina Panthers ===
On January 12, 2026, Gray signed a reserve/future contract with the Carolina Panthers. He was waived by the Panthers on August 17.

=== Minnesota Vikings ===
On August 19, 2026, Gray signed with the Minnesota Vikings. On August 30, he was waived by the Vikings as a part of the final roster cuts. Gray was re–signed to the Vikings' practice squad the next day. Minnesota waived Gray from the practice squad on September 2.

=== Indianapolis Colts ===
On October 29, 2026, Gray signed with the Indianapolis Colts' practice squad.
