= Justin Dedich =

American football player (born 2000)

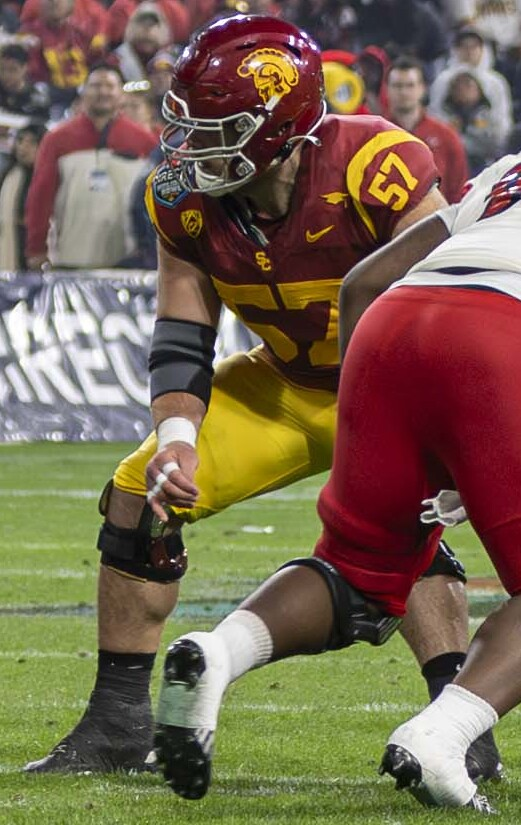
- Dedich with the USC Trojans in 2023

No. 67 – Los Angeles Rams
- Position: Guard
- Roster status: Active

Personal information
- Born: April 21, 2000 (age 26); Temecula, California, U.S.
- Listed height: 6 ft 2 in (1.88 m)
- Listed weight: 296 lb (134 kg)

Career information
- High school: Chaparral (Temecula, California)
- College: USC (2018–2023)
- NFL draft: 2024: undrafted

Career history
- Los Angeles Rams (2024–present)

Career NFL statistics as of 2025
- Games played: 29
- Games started: 9
- Stats at Pro Football Reference

Justin Dedich (born April 21, 2000) is an American professional football guard for the Los Angeles Rams of the National Football League (NFL). He played college football for the USC Trojans.

== College career ==
During Dedich's six-year career from 2018 to 2023 with USC, he played in 47 games where he earned 33 starts for the Trojans where he was named a PAC-12 all-conference honorable mention three times.

== Professional career ==
Pre-draft measurables
Height	Weight	Arm length	Hand span	Wingspan	40-yard dash	10-yard split	20-yard split	20-yard shuttle	Three-cone drill	Vertical jump	Broad jump	Bench press
6 ft 2 in (1.88 m)	301 lb (137 kg)	31 3/4 in (0.81 m)	9 3/4 in (0.25 m)	6 ft 5 5/8 in (1.97 m)	5.41 s	1.88 s	3.12 s	4.72 s	7.85 s	30.5 in (0.77 m)	8 ft 7 in (2.62 m)	32 reps
All values from Pro Day

After not being selected in the 2024 NFL draft, Dedich decided to sign with the Los Angeles Rams as an undrafted free agent. On August 27, 2024, Deidch was released by the Rams during final roster cuts, and re-signed to the team's practice squad the following day. On September 18, Dedich signed to the Rams active roster. During his rookie year, Dedich played in 13 games with three starts. In 2025, Dedich was active in 16 of the Rams' 17 regular season games and made six starts. He also started in L.A.'s 34-31 victory over Carolina in an NFC Wild Card game and was active throughout the Rams' playoff run. On March 2, 2026, the Rams announced that they were tendering Dedich as an exclusive rights free agent.

On August 30, 2026, Dedich was placed on injured reserve.
