= Keaton Bills =

American football player (born 1998)

Profile
- Position: Offensive guard

Personal information
- Born: May 22, 1998 (age 28)
- Listed height: 6 ft 4 in (1.93 m)
- Listed weight: 316 lb (143 kg)

Career information
- High school: Corner Canyon (Draper, Utah)
- College: Utah (2019–2023)
- NFL draft: 2024: undrafted

Career history
- Buffalo Bills (2024)*
- * Offseason or practice squad member only
- Stats at Pro Football Reference

Keaton Leavitt Bills (born May 22, 1998) is an American professional football offensive guard. He played college football for the Utah Utes.

== Early life ==
Bills, from Draper, Utah, is one of 11 children. He was a standout football player for Corner Canyon High School in Draper, playing as a two-way lineman while receiving first-team 4A all-state honors on the defensive line from the Deseret News as a senior, also being chosen that year second-team all-state to the defensive line by the Salt Lake Tribune and honorable mention for his play on the offensive line. A three-star recruit, he signed to play college football for the Utah Utes in 2016, but served a mission for The Church of Jesus Christ of Latter-day Saints (LDS) before joining the team.

== College career ==
In 2019, Bills played three games and took a redshirt. In 2020, he played and started in four games for the Utes. During the 2021 season, Bills he appeared in 12 games, eight as a starter. In 2022 season, Bills played all 14 games, starting 12, and earned All-Pac-12 Conference honorable mention. He started all 12 games in 2023 and named an honorable mention All-Pac-12 player for the second time. After the 2023 season, Bills declared for the 2024 NFL draft.

== Professional career ==
Pre-draft measurables
| Height | Weight | Arm length | Hand span | 40-yard dash | 10-yard split | 20-yard split | 20-yard shuttle | Three-cone drill | Vertical jump | Broad jump | Bench press |
|---|---|---|---|---|---|---|---|---|---|---|---|
| 6 ft 4 1/2 in (1.94 m) | 321 lb (146 kg) | 32 1/2 in (0.83 m) | 10 in (0.25 m) | 5.31 s | 1.86 s | 3.06 s | 4.81 s | 7.83 s | 29.5 in (0.75 m) | 8 ft 5 in (2.57 m) | 24 reps |
All values from NFL Scouting Combine/Pro Day

After not being selected in the 2024 NFL draft, Bills signed with the Buffalo Bills as an undrafted free agent. He was released as part of final roster cuts on August 27.
