= 2022 Pac-12 Conference football season =

American college football season

- League: NCAA Division I Football Bowl Subdivision
- Sport: Football
- Duration: September 1, 2022; January 9, 2023
- Teams: 12
- Total attendance: 3,506,889
- TV partner(s): Fox Sports Media Group, (Fox, FS1), ESPN Family, (ABC, ESPN, ESPN2, ESPNU), and Pac-12 Networks

2023 NFL draft
- Top draft pick: CB Christian Gonzalez, Oregon
- Picked by: New England Patriots, 16th overall

Regular season
- Season champions: USC
- Season MVP: Caleb Williams, QB, USC
- Top scorer: Denis Lynch, K, USC (110 points)

Pac-12 Championship
- Champions: Utah
- Runners-up: USC
- Finals MVP: Cameron Rising, QB, Utah

Football seasons
- 2021 2023

2022 Pac-12 Conference football standings
	Conf.			Overall
Team	W		L	W		L
No. 12 USC y	8	–	1	11	–	3
No. 10 Utah y$	7	–	2	10	–	4
No. 8 Washington	7	–	2	11	–	2
No. 15 Oregon	7	–	2	10	–	3
No. 17 Oregon State	6	–	3	10	–	3
No. 21 UCLA	6	–	3	9	–	4
Washington State	4	–	5	7	–	6
Arizona	3	–	6	5	–	7
California	2	–	7	4	–	8
Arizona State†	2	–	7	3	–	9
Stanford	1	–	8	3	–	9
Colorado	1	–	8	1	–	11
Championship: Utah 47, USC 24
$ – Conference champion; y – Championship game participant; Rankings from AP Poll

The 2022 Pac-12 Conference football season was the 44th edition of Pac-12 football during the 2022 NCAA Division I FBS football season. The season began on September 1, 2022, and ended with the 2022 Pac-12 Championship Game on December 2, 2022, at Allegiant Stadium in Paradise, Nevada.

The Pac-12 was a Power Five Conference under the College Football Playoff format along with the Atlantic Coast Conference, the Big 12 Conference, Big Ten Conference, and the Southeastern Conference.

The 2022 season was the first since the conference expanded to 12 teams in 2011 in which Pac-12 teams were not split into divisions. On May 18, 2022, the NCAA Division I Council approved a rule change that gave conferences complete freedom in choosing the participants in their championship games. On that same day, the Pac-12 announced that effective immediately, the championship game would feature the top two teams in the conference standings. The 2022 schedule, which was based on the conference's former North–South divisional model, did not change; the Pac-12 stated that it was reviewing multiple scheduling models for future seasons.

The Utah Utes’ participation in the 2022 Pac-12 Championship was decided by strength-of-schedule tiebreaker. Oregon, Utah, and Washington finished the regular season in a 3-way tie for 2nd place. Each team has a tied common opponent record and there was a tie for the next highest seed common opponent.

== Preseason ==
2022 Pac-12 Spring Football and number of signees on signing day:

- Arizona – 22
- Arizona State – 17
- California – 21
- Colorado – 20
- Oregon – 23
- Oregon State – 16
- Stanford – 21
- UCLA – 12
- USC – 26
- Utah – 18
- Washington – 10
- Washington State – 25

=== Recruiting classes ===
Rankings
Team	ESPN	Rivals	24/7	On3 Recruits	Signees
Arizona	—	22	20	30	22
Arizona State	25	―	86	110	17
California	21	59	57	52	21
Colorado	―	41	48	58	20
Oregon	8	66	64	32	23
Oregon State	―	54	50	57	16
Stanford	―	18	16	19	21
UCLA	―	53	47	29	12
USC	10	50	58	31	26
Utah	―	37	35	39	18
Washington	23	94	95	70	10
Washington State	―	65	60	76	25

=== Pac-12 Media Days ===
The Pac-12 conducted its 2022 Pac-12 media day on July 29, 2022, at the Novo Theater, LA Live (Pac-12 Network).

The teams and representatives in respective order were as follows:

- Pac-12 Commissioner –George Kliavkoff
- Arizona – Jedd Fisch (HC), Jacob Cowing (WR) & Christian Young (DB)
- Arizona State – Herm Edwards (HC), LaDarius Henderson (OL) & Kyle Soelle (LB)
- California – Justin Wilcox (HC), Matthew Cindric (OL) & Daniel Scott (S)
- Colorado – Karl Dorrell (HC), Casey Roddrick (OG) & Robert Barnes (ILB)
- Oregon – Dan Lanning (HC), Alex Forsyth (OL) & D. J. Johnson (OLB)
- Oregon State – Jonathan Smith (HC), Luke Musgrave (TE) & Alex Austin (DB)
- Stanford – David Shaw (HC), Tanner McKee (QB) & Kyu Blu Kelly (CB)
- UCLA – Chip Kelly (HC), Jon Gaines II (OL) & Stephan Blaylock (DB)
- USC – Lincoln Riley (HC), Caleb Williams (QB) & Shane Lee (LB)
- Utah – Kyle Whittingham (HC), Cameron Rising (QB) & Clark Phillips III (CB)
- Washington – Kalen DeBoer (HC), Jaxson Kirkland (OL) & Alex Cook (DB)
- Washington State – Jake Dickert (HC), Cam Ward (QB) & Ron Stone Jr. (DL)

==== Preseason Media polls ====
The preseason polls was released on July 28, 2022. Since 1992, the credentialed media has gotten the preseason champion correct just five times. Only nine times has the preseason pick even made it to the Pac-12 title game. Below are the results of the media poll with total points received next to each school and first-place votes in parentheses.

Predicted finish	Team	Votes (1st place)
1	Utah	384 (26)
2	Oregon	345 (2)
3	USC	341 (5)
4	UCLA	289
5	Oregon State	246
6	Washington	212
7	Washington State	177
8	Stanford	159
9	California	154
10	Arizona State	123
11	Arizona	86
12	Colorado	58

Media poll (Pac-12 Championship)
Rank	Team	Votes
1	Utah	26
2	Oregon	2
3	USC	5

=== Preseason awards ===
==== All−American Teams ====
	AP 1st Team	AP 2nd Team	AS 1st Team	AS 2nd Team	WCFF 1st Team	WCFF 2nd Team	ESPN	CBS 1st Team	CBS 2nd Team	CFN 1st Team	CFN 2nd Team	PFF 1st Team	PFF 2nd Team	SN 1st Team	SN 2nd Team
Andrew Vorhees, OL, USC	✓		✓		✓		✓	✓				✓			
Caleb Williams, QB, USC						✓							✓		
Clark Phillips III, DB, Utah		✓		✓		✓					✓	✓			
Edefuan Ulofoshio, DL, Washington		✓			✓							✓			✓
Jaxson Kirkland, OT, Washington										✓					
Jordan Addison, WR, USC	✓		✓		✓		✓	✓		✓		✓		✓	
Justin Flowe, LB, Oregon											✓				
Kyle Ostendorp, P, Arizona		✓				✓	✓		✓						✓
Kyu Blu Kelly, CB, Stanford												✓			
Mario Williams, WR, USC													✓		
Noah Sewell, LB, Oregon	✓		✓		✓			✓		✓		✓			
Sataoa Laumea, OG, Utah												✓			
T. J. Bass, OG, Oregon										✓					
Zion Tupuola-Fetui, DL, Washington					✓										

==== Individual awards ====
Award	Head Coach/Player	School	Position	Year	Ref
Lott Trophy	Kyon Barrs	Arizona	DL	Jr.	
Lott Trophy	Daniel Scott	California	S	Sr.	
Lott Trophy	Noah Sewell	Oregon	LB	So.	
Lott Trophy	Levani Damuni	Stanford	LB	Jr.	
Lott Trophy	Nick Figueroa	USC	DL	(redshirt) Graduate	
Lott Trophy	Zion Tupuola-Fetui	Washington	DE	Jr.	
Dodd Trophy	Kyle Whittingham	Utah	HC	—	
Maxwell Award	Jacob Cowing	Arizona	WR	Jr.	
Maxwell Award	Tanner McKee	Stanford	QB	Jr.	
Maxwell Award	Dorian Thompson-Robinson	UCLA	QB	Sr.	
Maxwell Award	Zach Charbonnet	UCLA	RB	Sr.	
Maxwell Award	Jordan Addison	USC	WR	Jr.	
Maxwell Award	Caleb Williams	USC	QB	So.	
Maxwell Award	Cameron Rising	Utah	QB	(redshirt) Jr.	
Maxwell Award	Tavion Thomas	Utah	RB	(redshirt) Jr.	
Maxwell Award	Cam Ward	Washington State	QB	So.	
Davey O'Brien Award	Xazavian Valladay	Arizona State	QB	(redshirt) Jr.	
Davey O'Brien Award	Cameron Rising	Utah	QB	(redshirt) Jr.	
Doak Walker Award	Damien Moore	California	RB	Jr.	
Doak Walker Award	Alex Fontenot	Colorado	RB	Sr.	
Doak Walker Award	Byron Cardwell	Oregon	RB	So.	
Doak Walker Award	Deshaun Fenwick	Oregon State	RB	Jr.	
Doak Walker Award	E. J. Smith	Stanford	RB	Jr.	
Doak Walker Award	Zach Charbonnet	UCLA	RB	Sr.	
Doak Walker Award	Travis Dye	USC	RB	Sr.	
Doak Walker Award	Austin Jones	USC	RB	Sr.	
Biletnikoff Award	Jacob Cowing	Arizona	WR	Jr.	
Biletnikoff Award	Jake Bobo	UCLA	WR	(redshirt) Graduate	
Biletnikoff Award	Jordan Addison	USC	WR	Jr.	

Award	Head Coach/Player	School	Position	Year	Ref
John Mackey Award	Brady Russell	Colorado	TE	Sr.	
John Mackey Award	Terrance Ferguson	Oregon	TE	Jr.	
John Mackey Award	Luke Musgrave	Oregon State	TE	Jr.	
John Mackey Award	Benjamin Yurosek	Stanford	TE	Jr.	
John Mackey Award	Michael Ezeike	UCLA	TE	(redshirt) Graduate	
John Mackey Award	Malcolm Epps	USC	TE	(redshirt) Sr.	
John Mackey Award	Dalton Kincaid	Utah	TE	Sr.	
John Mackey Award	Devin Culp	Washington	TE	Jr.	
Rimington Trophy	Matthew Cindric	California	OL	Sr.	
Rimington Trophy	Alex Forsyth	Oregon	OL	Sr.	
Rimington Trophy	Jake Levengood	Oregon State	OL	(redshirt) Jr.	
Rimington Trophy	Drake Nugent	Stanford	OL	Sr.	
Rimington Trophy	Brett Neilon	USC	OL	(redshirt) Sr.	
Butkus Award	Merlin Robertson	Arizona State	LB	Sr.	
Butkus Award	Justin Flowe	Oregon	LB	(redshirt) Fr.	
Butkus Award	Noah Sewell	Oregon	LB	So.	
Butkus Award	Levani Damuni	Stanford	LB	Sr.	
Butkus Award	Carl Jones Jr.	UCLA	LB	Sr.	
Butkus Award	Darius Muasau	UCLA	LB	Sr.	
Butkus Award	Mohamoud Diabate	Utah	LB	Sr.	
Butkus Award	Edefuan Ulofoshio	Washington	LB	(redshirt) Jr.	
Butkus Award	Daiyan Henley	Washington State	LB	Sr.	
Jim Thorpe Award	Kyu Blu Kelly	Stanford	DB	Sr.	
Jim Thorpe Award	Clark Phillips III	Utah	DB	So.	
Jim Thorpe Award	Cole Bishop	Utah	DB	So.	
Bronko Nagurski Trophy	Brandon Dorlus	Oregon	DE	Jr.	
Bronko Nagurski Trophy	Noah Sewell	Oregon	LB	So.	
Bronko Nagurski Trophy	Kyu Blu Kelly	Stanford	CB	So.	
Bronko Nagurski Trophy	Omar Speights	Oregon State	LB	Jr.	
Bronko Nagurski Trophy	Tuli Tuipulotu	USC	DT	Jr.	
Bronko Nagurski Trophy	Clark Phillips III	Utah	CB	So.	
Bronko Nagurski Trophy	Junior Tafuna	Utah	DT	So.	
Bronko Nagurski Trophy	Ron Stone Jr.	Washington State	DE	(redshirt) Jr.	
Outland Trophy	Kyon Barrs	Arizona	DL	Jr.	
Outland Trophy	T. J. Bass	Oregon	G	Sr.	
Outland Trophy	Alex Forsyth	Oregon	C	Sr.	
Outland Trophy	Marco Brewer	Oregon State	G	(redshirt) Jr.	
Outland Trophy	Braeden Daniels	Utah	T	Jr.	
Outland Trophy	Junior Tafuna	Utah	DT	So.	
Outland Trophy	Drake Nugent	Stanford	C	Sr.	
Outland Trophy	Junior Tafuna	Utah	DT	So.	
Outland Trophy	Andrew Vorhees	USC	G	(redshirt) Sr.	
Outland Trophy	Tuli Tuipulotu	USC	DT	Jr.	
Outland Trophy	Jaxson Kirkland	Washington	T	Sr.	

Award	Head Coach/Player	School	Position	Year	Ref
Lou Groza Award	Tyler Loop	Arizona	PK	So.	
Ray Guy Award	Kyle Ostendorp	Arizona	P	Jr.	
Ray Guy Award	Jamieson Sheahan	California	P	Sr.	
Ray Guy Award	Ryan Sanborn	Stanford	P	Sr.	
Paul Hornung Award	Jack Colletto	Oregon State	LB	(redshirt) Sr.	
Paul Hornung Award	Kazmeir Allen	UCLA	RB	(redshirt) Sr.	
Paul Hornung Award	Brenden Rice	USC	WR	Jr.	
Wuerffel Trophy	Jordan Morgan	Arizona	OL	Jr.	
Wuerffel Trophy	Matthew Cindric	California	OL	Sr.	
Wuerffel Trophy	Trey Paster	California	LB	Jr.	
Wuerffel Trophy	Joshka Gustav	Colorado	LB	So.	
Wuerffel Trophy	Alex Austin	Oregon State	DB	So.	
Wuerffel Trophy	John Humphreys	Stanford	WR	Jr.	
Wuerffel Trophy	Patrick Fields	Stanford	DB	Sr.	
Wuerffel Trophy	Tanner McKee	Stanford	QB	Jr.	
Wuerffel Trophy	Chase Griffin	UCLA	QB	Jr.	
Wuerffel Trophy	Caleb Williams	USC	QB	So.	
Wuerffel Trophy	Dalton Kincaid	Utah	TE	Sr.	
Wuerffel Trophy	Alex Cook	Washington	DB	Sr.	
Wuerffel Trophy	Travion Brown	Washington State	LB	Jr.	
Walter Camp Award	Noah Sewell	Oregon	LB	So.	
Walter Camp Award	Jordan Addison	USC	WR	Jr.	
Walter Camp Award	Caleb Williams	USC	QB	So.	
Walter Camp Award	Tavion Thomas	Utah	RB	(redshirt) Jr.	
Bednarik Award	Noah Sewell	Oregon	LB	So.	
Bednarik Award	Omar Speights	Oregon State	LB	Jr.	
Bednarik Award	Kyu Blu Kelly	Stanford	CB	Sr.	
Bednarik Award	Tuli Tuipulotu	USC	DT	Jr.	
Bednarik Award	Clark Phillips III	Utah	CB	So.	
Bednarik Award	Zion Tupuola-Fetui	Washington	DE	Jr.	
Bednarik Award	Ron Stone Jr.	Washington State	DE	(redshirt) Jr.	
Lombardi Award	Alex Forsyth	Oregon	C	Sr.	
Lombardi Award	Brandon Dorlus	Oregon	DE	Jr.	
Lombardi Award	Noah Sewell	Oregon	LB	So.	
Lombardi Award	Andrew Vorhees	USC	G	(redshirt) Sr.	
Lombardi Award	Tuli Tuipulotu	USC	DT	Jr.	
Lombardi Award	Braeden Daniels	Utah	OT	Jr.	
Lombardi Award	Jaxson Kirkland	Washington	OT	Sr.	
Lombardi Award	Ron Stone Jr.	Washington State	DE	(redshirt) Jr.	
Patrick Mannelly Award	Slater Zellers	California	LS	(redshirt) Sr.	
Patrick Mannelly Award	Karsten Battles	Oregon	LS	Sr.	
Patrick Mannelly Award	Jack Landherr IV	UCLA	LS	Sr.	
Patrick Mannelly Award	Simon Samarzich	Washington State	LS	Jr.	
Earl Campbell Tyler Rose Award	LaDarius Henderson	Arizona State	OL	Sr.	
Earl Campbell Tyler Rose Award	J. Michael Sturdivant	California	WR	(redshirt) Fr.	
Earl Campbell Tyler Rose Award	Alex Fontenot	Colorado	TB	(redshirt) Graduate	
Earl Campbell Tyler Rose Award	Damien Martinez	Oregon State	RB	Fr.	
Earl Campbell Tyler Rose Award	Elijah Higgins	Stanford	WR	Sr.	
Earl Campbell Tyler Rose Award	Kam Brown	UCLA	WR	Jr.	
Earl Campbell Tyler Rose Award	Malcolm Epps	USC	TE	(redshirt) Graduate	
Earl Campbell Tyler Rose Award	Courtland Ford	USC	OL	Jr.	
Earl Campbell Tyler Rose Award	Brant Kuithe	Utah	TE	Sr.	
Earl Campbell Tyler Rose Award	Ja'Lynn Polk	Washington	WR	Fr.	
Earl Campbell Tyler Rose Award	Cameron Ward	Washington State	QB	So.	
Polynesian College Football Player Of The Year Award	Jonah Savaiinaea	Arizona	OL	Fr.	
Polynesian College Football Player Of The Year Award	Tetairoa McMillan	Arizona	WR	Fr.	
Polynesian College Football Player Of The Year Award	Tiaoalii Savea	Arizona	DL	So.	
Polynesian College Football Player Of The Year Award	Merlin Robertson	Arizona State	LB	Sr.	
Polynesian College Football Player Of The Year Award	Muelu Iosefa	California	LB	Jr.	
Polynesian College Football Player Of The Year Award	Jaydn Ott	California	RB	Fr.	
Polynesian College Football Player Of The Year Award	Jalen Sami	Colorado	DL	So.	
Polynesian College Football Player Of The Year Award	Popo Aumavae	Oregon	DL	Sr.	
Polynesian College Football Player Of The Year Award	Taki Taimani	Oregon	DL	Jr.	
Polynesian College Football Player Of The Year Award	Malaesala Aumavae-Laulu	Oregon	OL	Sr.	
Polynesian College Football Player Of The Year Award	Mase Funa	Oregon	LB	Jr.	
Polynesian College Football Player Of The Year Award	Noah Sewell	Oregon	LB	So.	
Polynesian College Football Player Of The Year Award	Taliese Fuaga	Oregon State	OL	Fr.	
Polynesian College Football Player Of The Year Award	Levani Damuni	Stanford	LB	Sr.	
Polynesian College Football Player Of The Year Award	Ale Kaho	UCLA	LB	(redshirt) Sr.	
Polynesian College Football Player Of The Year Award	Atonio Mafi	UCLA	OL	(redshirt) Sr.	
Polynesian College Football Player Of The Year Award	Darius Muasau	UCLA	LB	Sr.	
Polynesian College Football Player Of The Year Award	Siale Taupaki	UCLA	OL	(redshirt) Jr.	
Polynesian College Football Player Of The Year Award	Jay Toia	UCLA	DL	So.	
Polynesian College Football Player Of The Year Award	Brandon Pili	USC	DL	(redshirt) Sr.	
Polynesian College Football Player Of The Year Award	Stanley Ta’ufo’ou	USC	DL	(redshirt) Jr.	
Polynesian College Football Player Of The Year Award	Tuli Tuipulotu	USC	DL	Jr.	
Polynesian College Football Player Of The Year Award	Sataoa Laumea	Utah	OL	So.	
Polynesian College Football Player Of The Year Award	Malone Mataele	Utah	CB	Jr.	
Polynesian College Football Player Of The Year Award	Johnny Maea	Utah	OL	Jr.	
Polynesian College Football Player Of The Year Award	Tennessee Pututau	Utah	DL	So.	
Polynesian College Football Player Of The Year Award	Junior Tafuna	Utah	DL	So.	
Polynesian College Football Player Of The Year Award	Devaughn Vele	Utah	WR	So.	
Polynesian College Football Player Of The Year Award	Ulumoo Ale	Washington	DL	Jr.	
Polynesian College Football Player Of The Year Award	Henry Bainivalu	Washington	OL	Sr.	
Polynesian College Football Player Of The Year Award	Troy Fautanu	Washington	OL	So.	
Polynesian College Football Player Of The Year Award	Tuli Letuligasenoa	Washington	DL	Jr.	
Polynesian College Football Player Of The Year Award	Zion Tupuola-Fetui	Washington	DL	Jr.	
Polynesian College Football Player Of The Year Award	Ma'ake Fifita	Washington State	OL	(redshirt) So.	
Manning Award	Dorian Thompson-Robinson	UCLA	QB	Sr.	
Manning Award	Cameron Rising	Utah	QB	Jr.	
Johnny Unitas Golden Arm Award	Jack Plummer	California	QB	(redshirt) Sr.	
Johnny Unitas Golden Arm Award	Brendon Lewis	Colorado	QB	So.	
Johnny Unitas Golden Arm Award	Bo Nix	Oregon	QB	Sr.	
Johnny Unitas Golden Arm Award	Chance Nolan	Oregon State	QB	(redshirt) Jr.	
Johnny Unitas Golden Arm Award	Tanner McKee	Stanford	QB	Jr.	
Johnny Unitas Golden Arm Award	Dorian Thompson-Robinson	UCLA	QB	Sr.	
Johnny Unitas Golden Arm Award	Cameron Rising	Utah	QB	Jr.	
Johnny Unitas Golden Arm Award	Dylan Morris	Washington	QB	So.	
Ted Hendricks Award					

==== Preseason All Pac-12 ====
First Team

Position	Player	Class	Team
First Team Offense
QB	Caleb Williams	So.	USC
RB	Zach Charbonnet	Jr.	UCLA
RB	Tavion Thomas	Jr.	Utah
WR	Jordan Addison	Jr.	USC (2)
WR	Mario Williams	So.	USC (3)
TE	Brant Kuithe	Jr.	Utah (2)
OL	Jaxson Kirkland	Sr.	Washington
OL	Braeden Daniels	Jr.	Utah (3)
OL	Alex Forsyth	Sr.	Oregon
OL	T. J. Bass	Sr.	Oregon (2)
OL	Andrew Vorhees	RS Sr.	USC (4)
First Team Defense
DL	Tuli Tuipulotu	Jr.	USC (5)
DL	Brandon Dorlus	Jr.	Oregon (3)
DL	Ron Stone Jr.	RS Jr.	Washington State
DL	Van Fillinger	So.	Utah (4)
LB	Noah Sewell	So.	Oregon (4)
LB	Omar Speights	So.	Oregon State
LB	Jackson Sirmon	So.	California
DB	Clark Phillips III	So.	Utah (5)
DB	Kyu Blu Kelly	Sr.	Stanford
DB	Cole Bishop	So.	Utah (6)
DB	Daniel Scott	RS Sr.	California (2)
First team special teams
PK	Dean Janikowski	RS So.	Washington State (2)
P	Kyle Ostendorp	Jr.	Arizona
AP	Travis Dye	GS.	USC (6)
RS	D.J. Taylor	RS So.	Arizona State

Second Team

Position	Player	Class	Team
Second Team Offense
QB	Cameron Rising	So.	Utah (7)
RB	Travis Dye	GS	USC (7)
RB	Byron Cardwell	So.	Oregon (5)
WR	Jacob Cowing	Jr.	Arizona (2)
WR	Jake Bobo	GS	UCLA (2)
TE	Benjamin Yurosek	Jr.	Stanford (2)
OL	Joshua Gray	RS Fr.	Oregon State (2)
OL	Brett Neilon	RS Sr.	USC (8)
OL	Sataoa Laumea	So.	Utah (8)
OL	Brandon Kipper	RS Jr.	Oregon State (3)
OL	LaDarius Henderson	Sr.	Arizona State (2)
Second Team Defense
DL	Zion Tupuola-Fetui	Jr.	Washington (2)
DL	Junior Tafuna	So.	Utah (9)
DL	Kyon Barrs	Jr.	Arizona (3)
DL	Brett Johnson	RS Jr.	California (3)
LB	Merlin Robertson	GS	Arizona State (3)
LB	Justin Flowe	RS Fr.	Oregon (6)
LB	Darius Muasau	Sr.	UCLA (3)
DB	Christian Gonzalez	So.	Oregon (7)
DB	Jaydon Grant	RS Jr.	Oregon State (4)
DB	Rejzohn Wright	Jr.	Oregon State (5)
DB	Mekhi Blackmon	RS Sr.	USC (9)
Second team special teams
PK	Camden Lewis	Jr.	Oregon (8)
P	Luke Loecher	Rs Jr.	Oregon State (6)
AP	Jack Colletto	RS Jr.	Oregon State (7)
RS	Gary Bryant Jr.	Jr.	USC (10)

All Pac–12 Honorable Mention (received votes from four or more members of the media):

- Arizona: Christian Roland-Wallace (DB)
- Arizona State: Xazavian Valladay (RB), Kyle Soelle (LB)
- California: Damien Moore (RB), Matthew Cindric (OL), Ben Coleman (OL), Oluwafemi Oladejo (LB), Lu-Magia Hearns III (DB), Dario Longhetto (PK), Nick Alftin (AP/ST)
- Colorado: Frank Filip (OL), Terrance Lang (DL), Jalen Sami (DL), Isaiah Lewis (DB), Nikko Reed (RS)
- Oregon: Ryan Walk (OL), Popo Aumavae (DL), Bennett Williams (DB), Jamal Hill (DB), Seven McGee (AP/ST)
- Oregon State: Jake Levengood (OL), Everett Hayes (PK)
- Stanford: Tanner McKee (QB), E. J. Smith (RB), Elijah Higgins (WR), Branson Bragg (OL), Walter Rouse (OL), Levani Damuni (LB), Ryan Sanborn (P), Casey Filkins (RS)
- UCLA: Dorian Thompson-Robinson (QB), Jon Gaines II (OL), Stephan Blaylock (DB)
- USC: Gary Bryant Jr. (WR), Nick Figueroa (DL), Solomon Byrd (DL), Korey Foreman (LB), Xavion Alford (DB), Brenden Rice (RS)
- Utah: Devaughn Vele (WR), Dalton Kincaid (TE), Mohamoud Diabate (LB), JaTravis Broughton (DB)
- Washington: Jalen McMillan (WR), Edefuan Ulofoshio (LB), Carson Bruener (LB), Giles Jackson (AP/ST)
- Washington State: De'Zhaun Stribling (WR), Brennan Jackson (DL), Daiyan Henley (LB), Armani Marsh (DB), Derrick Langford (DB), Nick Haberer (P)

== Head coaches ==
=== Coaching changes ===
There was three coaching changes before the 2022 season. Washington State removed the interim head coaching tag on November 27, 2021, making Jake Dickert the 34th coach in team history. On November 29, 2021 Lincoln Riley was hired as the 30th head coach in USC history. The Washington Huskies hired Kalen DeBoer on November 30, 2021, making DeBoer the 30th coach in team history. The Oregon Ducks hired Dan Lanning on December 12, 2021, making Lanning the 32nd coach in team history.

On September 18 following their loss to Eastern Michigan, Arizona State and coach Herm Edwards agreed to part ways. Edwards ended his career at Arizona State with an overall record of 26–20 & a record of 17–14 in conference play.

On October 2 following their loss to Arizona, Colorado fired coach Karl Dorrell. Dorrell ended his career at Colorado with an overall record of 8–15 & a record of 6–9 in conference play.

On November 27, just over an hour after losing to BYU to complete their second consecutive 3–9 season, Stanford coach David Shaw resigned, effective immediately, after 12 seasons with an overall record of 96–54 and a record of 65–40 in conference play.

=== Coaches ===
Note: All stats current through the completion of the 2021 season

Team	Head coach	Years at school	Overall record	Record at school	Pac–12 record
Arizona	Jedd Fisch	2	2–12	1–11	1–8
Arizona State	Shaun Aguano*	1	0–0	0–0	0–0
California	Justin Wilcox	6	26–28	26–28	15–25
Colorado	Mike Sanford Jr.*	1	9–16	0–0	0-0
Oregon	Dan Lanning	1	0–0	0–0	0–0
Oregon State	Jonathan Smith	5	16–28	16–28	12–22
Stanford	David Shaw	12	93–45	93–45	64–31
UCLA	Chip Kelly	5	64–32	18–25	16–18
USC	Lincoln Riley	1	55–10	0–0	0–0
Utah	Kyle Whittingham	18	143–69	143–69	88–55
Washington	Kalen DeBoer	1	79–9	0–0	0–0
Washington State	Jake Dickert*	2	3–3	3–3	3–1

Note:

- Jake Dickert served as interim head coach at Washington State in 2021 and coached for five games, going 3–3.
- Herm Edward coached the first three games as head coach at Arizona State State in 2022, going 1–2. Shaun Aguano took over the fourth game of the season.
- Karl Dorrell coached the first five games as head coach at Colorado in 2022, going 0–5. Mike Sanford Jr. took over the sixth game of the season.

== Rankings ==
		Pre	Wk 2	Wk 3	Wk 4	Wk 5	Wk 6	Wk 7	Wk 8	Wk 9	Wk 10	Wk 11	Wk 12	Wk 13	Wk 14	Wk 15	Final
Arizona	AP		RV														
Arizona	C																
Arizona	CFP	Not released															
Arizona State	AP																
Arizona State	C																
Arizona State	CFP	Not released															
California	AP																
California	C																
California	CFP	Not released															
Colorado	AP																
Colorado	C																
Colorado	CFP	Not released															
Oregon	AP	11	RV	25	15	13	12	12	10	8	8	6	12	10	15	15	15
Oregon	C	12	24	24	18	15	12	11	9	8	8	6	13	9	15	14	16
Oregon	CFP	Not released									8	6	12	9	16	15	15
Oregon State	AP		RV	RV	RV	RV			RV	RV	24	RV	25	22	16	17	17
Oregon State	C	RV	RV	RV	RV	RV				RV	RV	RV	RV	22	16	16	17
Oregon State	CFP	Not released									23		23	21	15	14	14
Stanford	AP																
Stanford	C																
Stanford	CFP	Not released															
UCLA	AP	RV	RV			RV	18	11	9	12	10	9	16	17	17	18	21
UCLA	C	RV	RV	RV		RV	19	12	10	15	11	10	16	18	17	18	21
UCLA	CFP	Not released									12	12	16	18	17	18	18
USC	AP	14	10	7	7	6	6	7	12	10	9	8	7	5	4	8	12
USC	C	15	12	8	7	6	6	6	12	11	9	7	6	5	4	8	13
USC	CFP	Not released									9	8	7	6	4	10	10
Utah	AP	7	13	14	13	12	11	20	15	14	12	13	10	14	12	7	10
Utah	C	8	15	15	14	13	11	19	15	14	12	13	10	14	12	10	11
Utah	CFP	Not released									14	13	10	14	11	8	8
Washington	AP				18	15	21			RV	RV	24	15	12	9	12	8
Washington	C				24	18	24	RV	RV	RV	RV	23	15	12	9	12	8
Washington	CFP	Not released										25	17	13	12	12	12
Washington State	AP			RV	RV	RV	RV	RV									
Washington State	C			RV	RV	RV	RV	RV						RV			
Washington State	CFP	Not released															

Legend
	Improvement in ranking
	Drop in ranking
	Not ranked previous week
	No change in ranking from previous week
RV	Received votes but were not ranked in Top 25 of poll
т	Tied with team above or below also with this symbol

== Schedules ==
Index to colors and formatting
Pac-12 member won
Pac-12 member lost
Pac-12 teams in **bold**

All times Pacific time. Pac-12 teams in bold.

† denotes Homecoming game

Rankings reflect those of the AP poll for weeks 1 through 9. Rankings from Week 10 until the end of the Season reflect those of the College Football Playoff Rankings.

=== Regular season ===
The regular season begin on September 1, 2022, and ended on December 2, 2022.

==== Week 1 ====
Date	Time	Visiting team	Home team	Site	TV	Result	Attendance	Ref.
September 1	7:00 p.m.	Northern Arizona	**Arizona State**	Sun Devil Stadium • Tempe, AZ	P12N	**W** 40–3	44,764	
September 2	7:00 p.m.	TCU	**Colorado**	Folsom Field • Boulder, CO	ESPN	**L** 13–38	47,868	
September 3	11:30 a.m.	Bowling Green	**UCLA**	Rose Bowl Stadium • Pasadena, CA	P12N	**W** 45–17	27,143	
September 3	12:30 p.m.	**Arizona**	San Diego State	Snapdragon Stadium • San Diego, CA	CBS	**W** 38-20	34,046	
September 3	12:30 p.m.	No. 11 **Oregon**	No. 3 Georgia	Mercedes-Benz Stadium • Atlanta, GA	ABC	**L** 3–49	76,490	
September 3	1:00 p.m.	No. 25 (FCS) UC Davis	**California**	California Memorial Stadium • Berkeley, CA	P12N	**W** 34–13	34,984	
September 3	3:00 p.m.	Rice	No. 14 **USC**	LA Memorial Coliseum • Los Angeles, CA	P12N	**W** 66–14	60,113	
September 3	4:00 p.m.	No. 7 **Utah**	Florida	Ben Hill Griffin Stadium • Gainesville, FL	ESPN	**L** 26–29	90,799	
September 3	5:00 p.m.	Colgate	**Stanford**	Stanford Stadium • Stanford, CA	P12N	**W** 41–10	26,826	
September 3	6:30 p.m.	Idaho	**Washington State**	Martin Stadium • Pullman, WA (Battle of the Palouse)	P12N	**W** 24–17	25,233	
September 3	7:30 p.m.	Boise State	**Oregon State**	Reser Stadium • Corvallis, OR	ESPN	**W** 34–17	27,732	
September 3	7:30 p.m.	Kent State	**Washington**	Husky Stadium • Seattle, WA	FS1	**W** 45–20	56,112	
^{#}Rankings from AP Poll released prior to game. All times are in Pacific Time.

==== Week 2 ====
Date	Time	Visiting team	Home team	Site	TV	Result	Attendance	Ref.
September 10	10:30 a.m.	Southern Utah	No. 13 **Utah**	Rice–Eccles Stadium • Salt Lake City, UT	P12N	**W** 73–7	51,531	
September 10	12:30 p.m.	**Colorado**	Air Force	Falcon Stadium • Colorado Springs, CO	CBS	**L** 10–41	33,647	
September 10	12:30 p.m.	**Washington State**	No. 19 Wisconsin	Camp Randall Stadium • Madison, WI	FOX	**W** 17–14	74,001	
September 10	1:00 p.m.	Portland State	**Washington**	Husky Stadium • Seattle, WA	P12N	**W** 52–6	57,518	
September 10	1:00 p.m.	UNLV	**California**	California Memorial Stadium • Berkeley, CA	P12N	**W** 20–14	38,180	
September 10	2:00 p.m.	Alabama State	**UCLA**	Rose Bowl Stadium • Pasadena, CA	P12N	**W** 45–7	33,647	
September 10	4:30 p.m.	**Arizona State**	No. 11 Oklahoma State	Boone Pickens Stadium • Stillwater, OK	ESPN2	**L** 17–34	54,949	
September 10	4:30 p.m.	No. 10 **USC**	**Stanford**	Stanford Stadium • Stanford, CA (Stanford–USC football rivalry)	ABC	**USC** 41–28	43,813	
September 10	5:30 p.m.	No. 12 (FCS) Eastern Washington	**Oregon**	Autzen Stadium • Eugene, OR	P12N	**W** 70–14	47,289	
September 10	7:30 p.m.	**Oregon State**	Fresno State	Bulldog Stadium • Fresno, CA	CBSSN	**W** 35–32	41,031	
September 10	8:00 p.m.	Mississippi State	**Arizona**	Arizona Stadium • Tucson, AZ	FS1	**L** 17–39	46,275	
^{#}Rankings from AP Poll released prior to game. All times are in Pacific Time.

==== Week 3 ====
Date	Time	Visiting team	Home team	Site	TV	Result	Attendance	Ref.
September 17	11:00 a.m.	South Alabama	**UCLA**	Rose Bowl Stadium • Pasadena, CA	P12N	**W** 32–31	29,344	
September 17	11:30 a.m.	**California**	Notre Dame	Notre Dame Stadium • South Bend, IN	NBC	**L** 17–24	77,622	
September 17	12:30 p.m.	**Colorado**	Minnesota	Huntington Bank Stadium • Minneapolis, MN	ESPN2	**L** 7–49	42,101	
September 17	12:30 p.m.	No. 12 BYU	No. 25 **Oregon**	Autzen Stadium • Eugene, OR	FOX	**W** 41–20	54,463	
September 17	2:00 p.m.	Colorado State	**Washington State**	Martin Stadium • Pullman, WA	P12N	**W** 38–7	23,611	
September 17	4:30 p.m.	No. 11 Michigan State	**Washington**	Husky Stadium • Seattle, WA	ABC	**W** 39–28	68,161	
September 17	5:00 p.m.	No. (FCS) 4 Montana State	**Oregon State**	Providence Park • Portland, OR	P12N	**W** 68–28	25,218	
September 17	7:00 p.m.	San Diego State	No. 14 **Utah**	Rice–Eccles Stadium • Salt Lake City, UT	ESPN	**W** 35–7	51,602	
September 17	7:30 p.m.	Fresno State	No. 7 **USC**	LA Memorial Coliseum • Los Angeles, CA	FOX	**W** 45–17	67,266	
September 17	8:00 p.m.	No. (FCS) 1 North Dakota State	**Arizona**	Arizona Stadium • Tucson, AZ	FS1	**W** 31–28	41,211	
September 17	8:00 p.m.	Eastern Michigan	**Arizona State**	Sun Devil Stadium • Tempe, AZ	P12N	**L** 21–30	43,788	
^{#}Rankings from AP Poll released prior to game. All times are in Pacific Time.

Date	Bye Week
September 17	Stanford

==== Week 4 ====
Date	Time	Visiting team	Home team	Site	TV	Result	Attendance	Ref.
September 24	11:00 a.m.	**UCLA**	**Colorado**	Folsom Field • Boulder, CO	P12N	**UCLA** 45–17	42,848	
September 24	1:00 p.m.	No. 15 **Oregon**	**Washington State**	Martin Stadium • Pullman, WA	FOX	**ORE** 44–41	33,058	
September 24	2:30 p.m.	**Arizona**	**California†**	California Memorial Stadium • Berkeley, CA	P12N	**CAL** 49–31	37,216	
September 24	6:30 p.m.	No. 7 **USC**	**Oregon State**	Reser Stadium • Corvallis, OR	P12N	**USC** 17–14	28,768	
September 24	7:30 p.m.	**Stanford**	No. 18 **Washington**	Husky Stadium • Seattle, WA	FS1	**WASH** 40–22	65,438	
September 24	7:30 p.m.	No. 13 **Utah**	**Arizona State**	Sun Devil Stadium • Tempe, AZ	ESPN	**UTAH** 34–13	39,876	
^{#}Rankings from AP Poll released prior to game. All times are in Pacific Time.

==== Week 5 ====
Date	Time	Visiting team	Home team	Site	TV	Result	Attendance	Ref.
September 30	7:30 p.m.	No. 15 **Washington**	**UCLA**	Rose Bowl • Pasadena, CA	ESPN	**UCLA** 40–32	41,343	
October 1	11:00 a.m.	**Oregon State**	No. 12 **Utah†**	Rice–Eccles Stadium • Salt Lake City, UT	P12N	**UTAH** 42–16	51,729	
October 1	2:30 p.m.	**California**	**Washington State†**	Martin Stadium • Pullman, WA	P12N	**WSU** 28–9	23,021	
October 1	6:30 p.m.	**Colorado**	**Arizona**	Arizona Stadium • Tucson, AZ	P12N	**ARIZ** 43–20	36,591	
October 1	7:30 p.m.	**Arizona State**	No. 6 **USC**	LA Memorial Coliseum • Los Angeles, CA	ESPN	**USC** 42–25	62,133	
October 1	8:00 p.m.	**Stanford**	No. 13 **Oregon**	Autzen Stadium • Eugene, OR	FS1	**ORE** 45–27	52,218	
^{#}Rankings from AP Poll released prior to game. All times are in Pacific Time.

==== Week 6 ====
Date	Time	Visiting team	Home team	Site	TV	Result	Attendance	Ref.
October 8	12:30 p.m.	No. 11 **Utah**	No. 18 **UCLA**	Rose Bowl Stadium • Pasadena, CA	FOX	**UCLA** 42–32	42,038	
October 8	1:00 p.m.	No. 21 **Washington**	**Arizona State**	Sun Devil Stadium • Tempe, AZ	P12N	**ASU** 45–38 (vacated)	39,244	
October 8	4:30 p.m.	**Washington State**	No. 6 **USC**	LA Memorial Coliseum • Los Angeles, CA	FOX	**USC** 30–14	63,204	
October 8	6:00 p.m.	No. 12 **Oregon**	**Arizona**	Arizona Stadium • Tucson, AZ	P12N	**ORE** 49–22	50,800	
October 8	8:00 p.m.	**Oregon State**	**Stanford**	Stanford Stadium • Stanford, CA	ESPN	**OSU** 28–27	32,482	
^{#}Rankings from AP Poll released prior to game. All times are in Pacific Time.

Date	Bye Week	
October 8	California	Colorado

==== Week 7 ====
Date	Time	Visiting team	Home team	Site	TV	Result	Attendance	Ref.
October 15	11:00 a.m.	**California**	**Colorado**	Folsom Field • Boulder, CO	P12N	**COL** 20–13^{OT}	50,471	
October 15	2:30 p.m.	**Arizona**	**Washington†**	Husky Stadium • Seattle, WA	P12N	**WASH** 49–39	63,189	
October 15	4:30 p.m.	**Stanford**	Notre Dame	Notre Dame Stadium • South Bend, IN (Legends Trophy)	NBC	**W** 16–14	77,622	
October 15	5:00 p.m.	No. 7 **USC**	No. 20 **Utah**	Rice–Eccles Stadium • Salt Lake City, UT	FOX	**UTAH** 43–42	53,609	
October 15	6:00 p.m.	**Washington State**	**Oregon State†**	Reser Stadium • Corvallis, OR	P12N	**OSU** 24–10	28,735	
^{#}Rankings from AP Poll released prior to game. All times are in Pacific Time.

Date	Bye Week		
October 15	Arizona State	No. 12 Oregon	No. 11 UCLA

==== Week 8 ====
Date	Time	Visiting team	Home team	Site	TV	Result	Attendance	Ref.
October 22	12:30 p.m.	No. 9 **UCLA**	No. 10 **Oregon†**	Autzen Stadium • Eugene, OR (College Gameday)	FOX	**ORE** 45–30	59,962	
October 22	1:00 p.m.	**Arizona State**	**Stanford†**	Stanford Stadium • Stanford, CA	P12N	**STAN** 15–14	25,061	
October 22	5:00 p.m.	**Colorado**	**Oregon State**	Reser Stadium • Corvallis, OR	P12N	**OSU** 42–9	27,679	
October 22	7:30 p.m.	**Washington**	**California**	California Memorial Stadium • Berkeley, CA	ESPN	**WASH** 28–21	34,601	
^{#}Rankings from AP Poll released prior to game. All times are in Pacific Time.

Date	Bye Week			
October 22	Arizona	No. 12 USC	No. 15 Utah	Washington State

==== Week 9 ====
Date	Time	Visiting team	Home team	Site	TV	Result	Attendance	Ref.
October 27	7:00 p.m.	No. 14 **Utah**	**Washington State**	Martin Stadium • Pullman, WA	FS1	**UTAH** 21–17	21,179	
October 29	12:30 p.m.	No. 8 **Oregon**	**California**	California Memorial Stadium • Berkeley, CA	FS1	**ORE** 42–24	37,077	
October 29	4:00 p.m.	No. 10 **USC**	**Arizona†**	Arizona Stadium • Tucson, AZ	P12N	**USC** 45–37	44,006	
October 29	4:30 p.m.	**Arizona State**	**Colorado†**	Folsom Field • Boulder, CO	ESPNU	**ASU** 42–34 (vacated)	40,334	
October 29	7:30 p.m.	**Stanford**	No. 12 **UCLA†**	Rose Bowl • Pasadena, CA	ESPN	**UCLA** 38–13	43,850	
^{#}Rankings from AP Poll released prior to game. All times are in Pacific Time.

Date	Bye Week	
October 29	Oregon State	Washington

==== Week 10 ====
Date	Time	Visiting team	Home team	Site	TV	Result	Attendance	Ref.
November 4	7:30 p.m.	No. 23 **Oregon State**	**Washington**	Husky Stadium • Seattle, WA	ESPN2	**WASH** 24–21	62,142	
November 5	12:30 p.m.	**Washington State**	**Stanford**	Stanford Stadium • Stanford, CA	P12N	**WSU** 52–14	26,515	
November 5	12:30 p.m.	No. 8 **Oregon**	**Colorado**	Folsom Field • Boulder, CO	ESPN	**ORE** 49–10	42,089	
November 5	4:30 p.m.	**Arizona**	No. 14 **Utah**	Rice–Eccles Stadium • Salt Lake City, UT	P12N	**UTAH** 45–20	51,919	
November 5	7:30 p.m.	No. 12 **UCLA**	**Arizona State**	Sun Devil Stadium • Tempe, AZ	FS1	**UCLA** 50–36	51,265	
November 5	7:30 p.m.	**California**	No. 9 **USC†**	LA Memorial Coliseum • Los Angeles, CA	ESPN	**USC** 41–35	64,916	
^{#}Rankings from College Football Playoff. All times are in Pacific Time.

==== Week 11 ====
Date	Time	Visiting team	Home team	Site	TV	Result	Attendance	Ref.
November 11	6:30 p.m.	**Colorado**	No. 8 **USC**	LA Memorial Coliseum • Los Angeles, CA	FS1	**USC** 55–17	61,206	
November 12	12:30 p.m.	**Arizona State**	**Washington State**	Martin Stadium • Pullman, WA	P12N	**WSU** 28–18	24,039	
November 12	4:00 p.m.	No. 25 **Washington**	No. 6 **Oregon**	Autzen Stadium • Eugene, OR (Oregon–Washington football rivalry)	FOX	**WASH** 37–34	58,756	
November 12	6:00 p.m.	**California**	**Oregon State**	Reser Stadium • Corvallis, OR	P12N	**OSU** 38–10	28,642	
November 12	7:00 p.m.	**Stanford**	No. 13 **Utah**	Rice–Eccles Stadium • Salt Lake City, UT	ESPN	**UTAH** 42–7	51,951	
November 12	7:30 p.m.	**Arizona**	No. 12 **UCLA**	Rose Bowl • Pasadena, CA	FOX	**ARIZ** 34–28	44,430	
^{#}Rankings from College Football Playoff. All times are in Pacific Time.

==== Week 12 ====
Date	Time	Visiting team	Home team	Site	TV	Result	Attendance	Ref.
November 19	11:00 a.m.	**Washington State**	**Arizona**	Arizona Stadium • Tucson, AZ	P12N	**WSU** 31–20	40,717	
November 19	11:15 a.m.	No. 23 **Oregon State**	**Arizona State†**	Sun Devil Stadium • Tempe, AZ	ESPN2	**OSU** 31–7	39,551	
November 19	2:30 p.m.	**Stanford**	**California**	California Memorial Stadium • Berkeley, CA (125th Big Game/Stanford Axe)	P12N	**CAL** 27–20	51,892	
November 19	5:00 p.m.	No. 7 **USC**	No. 16 **UCLA**	Rose Bowl • Pasadena, CA (Victory Bell)	FOX	**USC** 48–45	70,865	
November 19	6:00 p.m.	**Colorado**	No. 17 **Washington**	Husky Stadium • Seattle, WA	P12N	**WASH** 54–7	67,969	
November 19	7:30 p.m.	No. 10 **Utah**	No. 12 **Oregon**	Autzen Stadium • Eugene, OR	ESPN	**ORE** 20–17	57,009	
^{#}Rankings from College Football Playoff. All times are in Pacific Time.

==== Week 13 ====
Date	Time	Visiting team	Home team	Site	TV	Result	Attendance	Ref.
November 25	12:00 p.m.	**Arizona State**	**Arizona**	Arizona Stadium • Tucson, AZ (Territorial Cup)	FS1	**ARIZ** 38–35	49,865	
November 25	1:30 p.m.	No. 18 **UCLA**	**California**	California Memorial Stadium • Berkeley, CA (California–UCLA rivalry)	FOX	**UCLA** 35–28	36,221	
November 26	12:30 p.m.	No. 9 **Oregon**	No. 21 **Oregon State**	Reser Stadium • Corvallis, OR (Oregon–Oregon State football rivalry)	ABC	**OSU** 38–34	43,363	
November 26	1:00 p.m.	No. 14 **Utah**	**Colorado**	Folsom Field • Boulder, CO (Rumble in the Rockies)	P12N	**UTAH** 63–21	33,474	
November 26	4:30 p.m.	No. 15 Notre Dame	No. 6 **USC**	LA Memorial Coliseum • Los Angeles, CA (Jeweled Shillelagh)	ABC	**W** 38–27	72,613	
November 26	7:30 p.m.	No. 13 **Washington**	**Washington State**	Martin Stadium • Pullman, WA (Apple Cup)	ESPN	**WASH** 51–33	33,152	
November 26	8:00 p.m.	BYU	**Stanford**	Stanford Stadium • Stanford, CA	FS1	**L** 26–35	25,094	
^{#}Rankings from College Football Playoff. All times are in Pacific Time.

=== Pac-12 Championship Game ===
The Pac-12 Championship Game, the conference's eleventh championship game, will be played on December 2, 2022, at the home stadium of the Las Vegas Raiders at Allegiant Stadium in Paradise, Nevada. Starting in 2022, the two teams with the highest conference winning percentage will face off in the championship game. After a 48-45 victory over their home town rival, USC clinched the first spot in the conference title game.

Date	Time	Visiting team	Home team	Site	TV	Result	Attendance	Ref.
December 2, 2022	5:00 pm	No. 11 **Utah**	No. 4 USC	Allegiant Stadium • Paradise, NV	FOX	**UTAH** 47–24	61,195	
^{#}Rankings from College Football Playoff. All times are in Pacific Time.

== Postseason ==
=== Bowl games ===
For the 2020–2025 bowl cycle, The Pac-12 will have annually seven appearances in the following bowls: Rose Bowl (unless they are selected for playoffs filled by a Pac-12 team if champion is in the playoffs), LA Bowl, Las Vegas Bowl, Alamo Bowl, Holiday Bowl, and Sun Bowl. The Pac-12 teams will go to a New Year's Six bowl if a team finishes higher than the champions of Power Five conferences in the final College Football Playoff rankings. The Pac-12 champion are also eligible for the College Football Playoff if they're among the top four teams in the final CFP ranking.

Legend
Pac-12 win
Pac-12 loss

Bowl game	Date	Site	Television	Time (PST)	Pac-12 team	Opponent	Score	Attendance
SRS Distribution Las Vegas Bowl	December 17, 2022	Allegiant Stadium • Paradise, NV	ESPN	11:30 a.m.	No. 14 **Oregon State**	Florida	**Oregon State 30**–3	29,750
Los Angeles Bowl	December 17, 2022	SoFi Stadium • Inglewood, CA	ABC	12:30 p.m.	Washington State	**Fresno State**	**Fresno State 29**–6	32,405
Holiday Bowl	December 28, 2022	Petco Park • San Diego, CA	FOX	5:00 p.m.	No. 15 **Oregon**	North Carolina	**Oregon 28**–27	36,242
Alamo Bowl	December 29, 2022	Alamodome • San Antonio, TX	ESPN	6:00 p.m.	No. 12 **Washington**	No. 20 Texas	**Washington 27**–20	62,730
Tony the Tiger Sun Bowl	December 30, 2022	Sun Bowl • El Paso, TX	CBS	11:00 a.m.	No. 18 UCLA	**Pitt**	**Pittsburgh 37**–35	41,104
**New Year's Six Bowl**
Cotton Bowl Classic	January 2, 2023	AT&T Stadium • Arlington, Texas	ESPN	9:00 a.m.	No. 10 USC	No. 16 **Tulane**	**Tulane 46**–45	55,329
Rose Bowl	January 2, 2023	Rose Bowl • Pasadena, CA	ESPN	2:00 p.m.	No. 8 Utah	No. 11 **Penn State**	**Penn State 35**–21	94,873

Rankings are from CFB Rankings. All times Pacific Time Zone. Pac-12 teams shown in bold.

=== Selection of teams ===
- **Bowl eligible (7): Oregon, Oregon State, UCLA, USC, Utah, Washington, & Washington State**
- **Bowl-ineligible (5): Arizona, Arizona State, California, Colorado, & Stanford**

== Head to head matchups ==
This table summarizes the head-to-head results between teams in conference play.

	Arizona	Arizona State	California	Colorado	Oregon	Oregon State	Stanford	UCLA	USC	Utah	Washington	Washington State
vs. Arizona	–	0–1	1–0	0–1	1–0	0–0	0–0	0–1	1–0	1–0	1–0	1–0
vs. Arizona State	1–0	–	0–0	0–1	0–0	1–0	1–0	1–0	1–0	1–0	0–1	1–0
vs. California	0–1	0–0	–	1–0	1–0	1–0	0–1	1–0	1–0	0–0	1–0	1–0
vs. Colorado	1–0	1–0	0–1	–	1–0	1–0	0–0	1–0	1–0	1–0	1–0	0–0
vs. Oregon	0–1	0–0	0–1	0–1	–	1–0	0–1	0–1	0–0	0–1	1–0	0–1
vs. Oregon State	0–0	0–1	0–1	0–1	0–1	–	0–1	0–0	1–0	1–0	1–0	0–1
vs. Stanford	0–0	0–1	1–0	0–0	1–0	1–0	–	1–0	1–0	1–0	1–0	1–0
vs. UCLA	1–0	0–1	0–1	0–1	1–0	0–0	0–1	–	1–0	0–1	0–1	0–0
vs. USC	0–1	0–1	0–1	0–1	0–0	0–1	0–1	0–1	–	1–0	0–0	0–1
vs. Utah	0–1	0–1	0–0	0–1	1–0	0–1	0–1	1–0	0–1	–	0–0	0–1
vs. Washington	0–1	1–0	0–1	0–1	0–1	0–1	0–1	1–0	0–0	0–0	–	0–1
vs. Washington State	0–1	0–1	0–1	0–0	1–0	1–0	0–1	0–0	1–0	1–0	1–0	–
Total	3–6	2–7	2–7	1–8	7–2	6–3	1–8	6–3	8–1	7–2	7–2	4–5

Updated with the results of all games through December 2022.

=== Pac-12 records vs Other Conferences ===
2022–2023 records against non-conference foes:

Regular season

Power 5 Conferences	Record
ACC	0–0
Big Ten	2–1
Big 12	0–2
BYU/Notre Dame	3–2
SEC	0–3
Power 5 Total	5–8
Other FBS Conferences	Record
American	0–0
C–USA	1–0
Independents (Excluding BYU & Notre Dame)	0–0
MAC	2–1
Mountain West	7–1
Sun Belt	1–0
Other FBS Total	11–2
FCS Opponents	Record
Football Championship Subdivision	10–0
Total Non-Conference Record	26–10

Post Season

Power Conferences 5	Record
ACC	1–1
Big Ten	0–1
Big 12	1–0
SEC	1–0
Power 5 Total	3–2
Other FBS Conferences	Record
American	0–1
Mountain West	0–1
Other FBS Total	0–1
Total Bowl Record	3–4

=== Pac-12 vs Power Five matchups ===
The following games include Pac-12 teams competing against Power Five conference teams from the ACC, Big Ten, Big 12, and SEC, plus independents Notre Dame (an ACC member in non-football sports) and BYU (a future Big 12 member). All rankings are from the AP Poll at the time of the game.

Date	Conference	Visitor	Home	Site	Score
September 2	Big 12	TCU	Colorado	Folsom Field • Boulder, CO	L 13–38
September 3	SEC	No. 7 Utah	Florida	Ben Hill Griffin Stadium • Gainesville, FL	L 26–29
September 3	SEC	No. 3 Georgia	No. 11 Oregon†	Mercedes-Benz Stadium • Atlanta, GA	L 3–49
September 10	SEC	Mississippi State	Arizona	Arizona Stadium • Tucson, AZ	L 17–39
September 10	Big 12	Arizona State	No. 11 Oklahoma State	Boone Pickens Stadium • Stillwater, OK	L 17–34
September 10	Big 10	Washington State	No. 19 Wisconsin	Camp Randall Stadium • Madison, WI	W 17–10
September 17	Big 10	Colorado	Minnesota	Huntington Bank Stadium • Minneapolis, MN	L 7–49
September 17	Independent	California	Notre Dame	Notre Dame Stadium • South Bend, IN	L 17–24
September 17	Independent	No. 12 BYU	No. 25 Oregon	Autzen Stadium • Eugene, OR	W 41–20
September 17	Big 10	No. 11 Michigan State	Washington	Husky Stadium • Seattle, WA	W 39–28
October 15	Independent	Stanford	Notre Dame	Notre Dame Stadium • South Bend, IN	W 16–14
November 26	Independent	BYU	Stanford	Stanford Stadium • Stanford, CA	L 26–35
November 26	Independent	Notre Dame	USC	Los Angeles Memorial Coliseum • Los Angeles, CA	W 38–27

=== Pac-12 vs Group of Five matchups ===
The following games include Pac-12 teams competing against teams from the American, C-USA, MAC, Mountain West or Sun Belt.

Date	Conference	Visitor	Home	Site	Score
September 3	Mountain West	Arizona	San Diego State	Snapdragon Stadium • San Diego, CA	W 38–20
September 3	Mountain West	Boise State	Oregon State	Reser Stadium • Corvallis, OR	W 34–17
September 3	MAC	Bowling Green	UCLA	Rose Bowl • Pasadena, CA	W 45–17
September 3	C-USA	Rice	No. 14 USC	Los Angeles Memorial Coliseum • Los Angeles, CA	W 66–14
September 3	MAC	Kent State	Washington	Husky Stadium • Seattle, WA	W 45–20
September 10	Mountain West	UNLV	California	California Memorial Stadium • Berkeley, CA	W 20–14
September 10	Mountain West	Colorado	Air Force	Falcon Stadium • Colorado Springs, CO	L 10–41
September 10	Mountain West	Oregon State	Fresno State	Bulldog Stadium • Fresno, CA	W 35–32
September 17	MAC	Eastern Michigan	Arizona State	Sun Devil Stadium • Tempe, AZ	L 21–30
September 17	Sun Belt	South Alabama	UCLA	Rose Bowl • Pasadena, CA	W 32–31
September 17	Mountain West	Fresno State	No. 7 USC	Los Angeles Memorial Coliseum • Los Angeles, CA	W 45–17
September 17	Mountain West	San Diego State	No. 14 Utah	Rice-Eccles Stadium • Salt Lake City, UT	W 35–7
September 17	Mountain West	Colorado State	Washington State	Martin Stadium • Pullman, WA	W 38–7

=== Pac-12 vs FBS independents matchups ===
The following games include Pac-12 teams competing against FBS Independents, which includes Army, Liberty, New Mexico State, UConn or UMass.

Date	Visitor	Home	Site	Score
				•

=== Pac-12 vs FCS matchups ===
The Football Championship Subdivision comprises 13 conferences and two independent programs.

Date	Visitor	Home	Site	Score
September 3	Northern Arizona	Arizona State	Sun Devil Stadium • Tempe, AZ	W 40–3
September 3	UC Davis	California	California Memorial Stadium • Berkeley, CA	W 34–13
September 3	Colgate	Stanford	Stanford Stadium • Stanford, CA	W 41–10
September 3	Idaho	Washington State	Martin Stadium • Pullman, WA	W 24–17
September 10	Eastern Washington	Oregon	Autzen Stadium • Eugene, OR	W 70–14
September 10	Alabama State	UCLA	Rose Bowl • Pasadena, CA	W 45–7
September 10	Southern Utah	No. 13 Utah	Rice-Eccles Stadium • Salt Lake City, UT	W 73–7
September 10	Portland State	Washington	Husky Stadium • Seattle, WA	W 52–6
September 17	North Dakota State	Arizona	Arizona Stadium • Tucson, AZ	W 31–28
September 17	Montana State	Oregon State†	Providence Park • Portland, OR	W 66–28

Note:† Denotes Neutral Site Game

== Awards and honors ==
=== Player of the week honors ===
Week	Offensive			Defensive			Special teams			Offensive line			Defensive line			Freshman		
Week	Player	Team	Position	Player	Team	Position	Player	Team	Position	Player	Team	Position	Player	Team	Position	Player	Team	Position
Week 1 (Sep. 6)	Jayden de Laura	Arizona	QB	Jaydon Grant	Oregon State	DB	Carter Brown	Arizona State	K	Brandon Kipper	Oregon State	RG	Jalen Harris	Arizona	DE	Jaydn Ott	California	RB
Week 2 (Sep. 12)	Caleb Williams	USC	QB	Kitan Oladapo	Oregon State	DB	Renard Bell	Washington State	WR/KR	Jarrett Kingston	Washington State	LT	Tuli Tuipulotu	USC	DL	Jaydn Ott (2)	California	RB
Week 3 (Sep. 19)	Michael Penix Jr.	Washington	QB	Daiyan Henley	Washington State	LB	Nicholas Barr-Mira	UCLA	K	Troy Fautanu	Washington	LT	Hunter Echols & Brandon Dorlus	Arizona & Oregon	DL	Ja'Lynn Polk	Washington	WR
Week 4 (Sep. 26)	Jaydn Ott	California	RB	Laiatu Latu	UCLA	DE	Peyton Henry	Washington	K	Ben Coleman	California	LT	Mase Funa	Oregon	OLB	Jaydn Ott (3)	California	RB
Week 5 (Oct. 3)	Dorian Thompson-Robinson	UCLA	QB	Clark Phillips III	Utah	CB	Joshua Karty	Stanford	K	T. J. Bass	Oregon	LT	Brandon Dorlus (2)	Oregon	DE	Tetairoa McMillan	Arizona	WR
Week 6 (Oct 10)	Dorian Thompson-Robinson (2)	UCLA	QB	Tuli Tuipulotu	USC	DL	Carter Brown (2)	Arizona State	K	T.J. Bass (2)	Oregon	LT	Tuli Tuipulotu (2)	USC	DL	Jaylen Jenkins	Washington State	RB
Week 7 (Oct 17)	Cameron Rising	Utah	QB	Jonathan McGill	Stanford	S	Joshua Karty (2)	Stanford	K	Braeden Daniels	Utah	LT	Jeremiah Martin	Washington	DE	Tetairoa McMillan (2)	Arizona	WR
Week 8 (Oct 24)	Bo Nix	Oregon	QB	Alex Austin	Oregon State	DB	Joshua Karty (3)	Stanford	K	Alex Forsyth	Oregon	C	Bralen Trice	Washington	DE	Damien Martinez	Oregon State	RB
Week 9 (Oct 31)	Bo Nix (2)	Oregon	QB	Bryson Shaw	USC	DB	Jordyn Tyson	Colorado	WR/KR	Malaesala Aumavae-Laulu	Oregon	RT	D. J. Johnson	Oregon	OLB	Jordyn Tyson	Colorado	WR/KR
Week 10 (Nov. 7)	Bo Nix (3)	Oregon	QB	Christian Gonzalez	Oregon	DB	Peyton Henry (2)	Washington	K	Jon Gaines II	UCLA	G	Tuli Tuipulotu (3)	USC	DL	Jaden Hicks	Washington State	DB
Week 11 (Nov. 14)	Michael Penix Jr. (2)	Washington	QB	Tuli Tuipulotu (2)	USC	DL	Peyton Henry (3)	Washington	K	Corey Luciano	Washington	C	Brennan Jackson	Washington State	EDGE	Jacob Manu	Arizona	LB
Week 12 (Nov. 21)	Caleb Williams (2)	USC	QB	Bennett Williams	Oregon	DB	Joshua Karty (4)	Stanford	K	Andrew Vorhees	USC	G	Tuli Tuipulotu (4)	USC	DL	Damien Martinez (2)	Oregon State	RB
Week 13 (Nov. 28)	Michael Penix Jr. (3)	Washington	QB	Kitan Oladapo (2)	Oregon State	DB	Cade Brownholtz	Oregon State	OLB	Henry Bainivalu	Washington	G	Jeremiah Martin	Washington	EDGE	Damien Martinez (3)	Oregon State	RB

==== Totals per school ====
School	Total
Oregon	13
Washington	12
USC	10
Oregon State	9
Arizona	6
Washington State	6
California	5
Stanford	5
UCLA	4
Utah	3
Colorado	2
Arizona State	2

=== Pac-12 individual awards ===
The following individuals received postseason honors as voted by the Pac-12 Conference football coaches at the end of the season

Award	Player	School
Offensive Player of the Year	Caleb Williams	USC
Defensive Player of the Year	Tuli Tuipulotu	USC
Offensive Freshman of the Year	Damien Martinez	Oregon State
Defensive Freshman of the Year	Lander Barton	Utah
Scholar Athlete of the Year	Nick Figueroa	USC
Co-Coaches of the Year	Kalen DeBoer & Jonathan Smith	Washington & Oregon State

=== All-conference teams ===
The following players earned All-Pac-12 honors. Any teams showing (_) following their name are indicating the number of All-Pac-12 Conference Honors awarded to that university for 1st team and 2nd team respectively.

First Team

Position	Player	Class	Team
First Team Offense
QB	Caleb Williams	So.	USC (1)
RB	Zach Charbonnet	Sr.	UCLA (1)
RB	Damien Martinez	Fr.	Oregon State (1)
WR	Rome Odunze	So.	Washington (1)
WR	Jordan Addison	Jr.	USC (2)
TE	Dalton Kincaid	Sr.	Utah (1)
OL	T. J. Bass†	Sr.	Oregon (1)
OL	Braeden Daniels	Jr.	Utah (2)
OL	Alex Forsyth	Sr.	Oregon (2)
OL	Andrew Vorhees	R-Sr.	USC (3)
OL	Jaxson Kirkland‡	Sr.	Washington (2)
OL	Sataoa Laumea	So.	Utah (3)
First Team Defense
DL	Tuli Tuipulotu†	Jr.	USC (4)
DL	Laiatu Latu	R-Jr.	UCLA (2)
DL	Bralen Trice	So.	Washington (3)
DL	Jeremiah Martin	Sr.	Washington (4)
LB	Daiyan Henley	R-Sr.	Washington State (1)
LB	Jackson Sirmon	R-Sr.	California (1)
LB	Omar Speights	Jr.	Oregon State (2)
DB	Clark Phillips III	So.	Utah (4)
DB	Christian Gonzalez	So.	Oregon (3)
DB	Mekhi Blackmon	R-Sr.	USC (5)
DB	Rejzohn Wright	Sr.	Oregon State (3)
First team special teams
PK	Joshua Karty	Jr.	Stanford (1)
P	Eddie Czaplicki	So.	Arizona State (1)
RS	Anthony Gould	R-So.	Oregon State (4)
AP/ST	Jack Colletto	R-Sr.	Oregon State (5)

Second Team

Position	Player	Class	Team
Second Team Offense
QB	Michael Penix Jr.	Jr.	Washington (5)
RB	Xazavian Valladay	Gr.	Arizona State (2)
RB	Travis Dye	R-Sr.	USC (6)
WR	Dorian Singer	So.	Arizona (1)
WR	Troy Franklin	So.	Oregon (4)
TE	Benjamin Yurosek	Jr.	Stanford (2)
OL	Troy Fautanu	So.	Washington (6)
OL	Taliese Fuaga	So.	Oregon State (5)
OL	Brett Neilon	R-Sr.	USC (7)
OL	Joshua Gray	R-So.	Oregon State (6)
OL	Atonio Mafi	R-Sr.	UCLA (3)
Second Team Defense
DL	Brandon Dorlus	Jr.	Oregon (5)
DL	Ron Stone Jr.	R-Jr.	Washington State (2)
DL	Brennan Jackson	R-Jr.	Washington State (3)
DL	Junior Tafuna	So.	Utah (5)
LB	Noah Sewell	So.	Oregon (6)
LB	Karene Reid	So.	Utah (6)
LB	Darius Muasau	Sr.	UCLA (4)
DB	Jaydon Grant	R-Sr.	Oregon State (7)
DB	Kyu Blu Kelly		Stanford (3)
DB	Calen Bullock	So.	USC (8)
DB	Alex Cook	Sr.	Washington (7)
Second team special teams
PK	Peyton Henry	Sr.	Washington (8)
P	Jamieson Sheahan	Sr.	California (2)
RS	Silas Bolden	So.	Oregon State (8)
AP/ST	Daiyan Henley	R-Sr.	Washington State (4)

Notes:

- RS = Return specialist
- AP/ST = All-purpose/special teams player (not a kicker or returner)
- † Two-time first team selection;
- ‡ Three-time first team selection

Honorable mentions

- ARIZONA: WR Jacob Cowing, Jr.; QB Jayden de Laura, So.; K Tyler Loop, So.; OL Jordan Morgan, Jr.; OL Jonah Savaiinaea, Fr.; RB Michael Wiley, Jr.
- ARIZONA STATE: WR Elijhah Badger, R-So.; DB Jordan Clark, R-Jr.; TE Jalin Conyers, R-So.; RS Daniyel Ngata, R-So.; LB Merlin Robertson, 5th; DL Nesta Jade Silvera, Gr; LB Kyle Soelle, R-5th; DB Ro Torrance, R-So.
- CALIFORNIA: DB Jeremiah Earby, Fr.; WR/RS Jeremiah Hunter, Jr.; RB Jaydn Ott, Fr.; DB Daniel Scott, R-Sr.; WR J. Michael Sturdivant, R-Fr.; DB Craig Woodson, R-Jr.
- COLORADO: ILB Josh Chandler-Semedo, Gr.; DB/RS Nikko Reed, So.; OL Casey Roddick, Jr.; TE Brady Russell, Sr.; DL Jalen Sami, Jr.
- OREGON: OL Malaesala Aumavae-Laulu, Sr.; WR Chase Cota, Sr.; TE Terrance Ferguson, So.; RB Bucky Irving, So.; OLB D. J. Johnson, Sr.; K Camden Lewis, Jr.; QB Bo Nix, Sr.; OL Ryan Walk, Sr.; DB Bennett Williams, Sr.
- OREGON STATE: DB Alex Austin, R-So.; DB Ryan Cooper Jr., Jr.; LB Kyrei Fisher-Morris, R-Sr.; WR Tre'Shaun Harrison, Sr.; OL Brandon Kipper, R-Sr.; OL Jake Levengood, R-Jr.; P Luke Loecher, R-Sr.; DL Sione Lolohea, So.; DB Kitan Oladapo, R-Jr.; DL James Rawls, R-Jr.
- STANFORD: LB Levani Dumani, Sr.; DL Stephen Herron, Sr.; WR Elijah Higgins, Sr.; LB Ricky Miezan, 5th, OL Drake Nugent, Sr.; OL Walter Rouse, Sr.; P Ryan Sanborn, Sr.; AP/ST Brycen Tremayne, 5th; WR Michael Wilson, 5th
- UCLA: DB Stephan Blaylock, R-Sr.; WR Jake Bobo, R-Sr.; OL Jon Gaines II, Sr.; QB Dorian Thompson-Robinson, R-Sr.
- USC: OL Justin Dedich, R-Sr.; OL Jonah Monheim, R-So.; LB Shane Lee, Sr.; WR Tahj Washington, R-Jr.; DB Max Williams, R-Jr.
- UTAH: OL Keaton Bills, So.; S Cole Bishop, So.; DL Jonah Elliss, So.; DB R.J. Hubert, Sr.; QB Cameron Rising, Jr.; WR Devaughn Vele, So.
- WASHINGTON: OL Henry Bainivalu, Sr.; LB Cam Bright, Sr.; OL Corey Luciano, Sr.; WR Jalen McMillan, So.; RB Wayne Taulapapa, Gr.; DL Zion Tupuola-Fetui, Jr.; LB Alphonzo Tuputala, So.; DB Asa Turner, Jr.
- WASHINGTON STATE: RS Robert Ferrel, 5th; P Nick Haberer, So.; OL Jarrett Kingston, R-Jr.; DB Armani Marsh, R-Sr.; DB Chau Smith-Wade, So.; QB Cam Ward, So.; RB Nakia Watson, R-Jr.

=== All-Americans ===
Currently, the NCAA compiles consensus all-America teams in the sports of Division I-FBS football and Division I men's basketball using a point system computed from All-America teams named by coaches associations or media sources. The system consists of three points for a first-team honor, two points for second-team honor, and one point for third-team honor. Honorable mention and fourth team or lower recognitions are not accorded any points. College Football All-American consensus teams are compiled by position and the player accumulating the most points at each position is named first team consensus all-American. Currently, the NCAA recognizes All-Americans selected by the AP, AFCA, FWAA, TSN, and the WCFF to determine Consensus and Unanimous All-Americans. Any player named to the First Team by all five of the NCAA-recognized selectors is deemed a Unanimous All-American.

Position	Player	School	Selector	Unanimous	Consensus
First Team All-Americans
QB	Caleb Williams	USC	AP, AFCA, FWAA, TSN, WCFF, CBS, ESPN, FOX, Phil Steele, The Athletic, USAT	✓	
OL	Andrew Vorhees	USC	AP, FOX, USAT		
DL	Tuli Tuipulotu	USC	AP, AFCA, FWAA, TSN, WCFF, CBS, FOX, Phil Steele, The Athletic, USAT	✓	
CB	Clark Phillips III	Utah	AP, AFCA, FWAA, TSN, WCFF, CBS, FOX, Phil Steele, The Athletic, USAT	✓	
PR	Anthony Gould	Oregon State	TSN, CBS, ESPN		
AP	Zach Charbonnet	UCLA	FWAA		
AP	Jack Colletto	Oregon State	Phil Steele		
K	Joshua Karty	Stanford	TSN, Phil Steele		

Position	Player	School	Selector	Unanimous	Consensus
Second Team All-Americans
RB	Zach Charbonnet	UCLA	CBS		
AP/ATH	Zach Charbonnet	UCLA	AP, TSN		✓
OL	T. J. Bass	Oregon	The Athletic		
OL	Alex Forsyth	Oregon	FWAA, Phil Steele		
C	Brett Neilon	USC	TSN, CBS, FOX,		
OL	Andrew Vorhees	USC	FWAA, TSN, WCFF, CBS, The Athletic, Phil Steele		✓
DL	Bralen Trice	Washington	TSN		
K	Joshua Karty	Stanford	FWAA, CBS, FOX, The Athletic		✓

Position	Player	School	Selector	Unanimous	Consensus
Third Team All-Americans
OL	Jaxson Kirkland	Washington	AP		
C	Brett Neilon	USC	AP		
TE	Dalton Kincaid	Utah	AP, Phil Steele		
WR	Rome Odunze	Washington	AP		
PR	Anthony Gould	Oregon State	Phil Steele		
K	Joshua Karty	Stanford	AP		

Fourth Team:

- Zach Charbonnet, RB, UCLA − Phil Steele
- Rome Odunze, WR, Washington − Phil Steele
- T. J. Bass, OL, Oregon − Phil Steele
- Christian Gonzalez, DB, Oregon − Phil Steele

*American Football Coaches Association All-America Team
*AP All-America team
*The Athletic All-America Team
*CBS Sports All-America Team
*Phil Steele's 2022 Postseason All-American Team
*ESPN All-America Team
*FWAA All-America Team
*Sporting News All-America Team
*USA Today All-America Team
*Walter Camp All-America Team

=== National award winners ===
2022 College Football Award Winners

Award	Player	School
Heisman Trophy	Caleb Williams	USC
Maxwell Award	Caleb Williams	USC
Walter Camp Award	Caleb Williams	USC
AP College Football Player of the Year	Caleb Williams	USC
Paul Hornung Award	Jack Colletto	Oregon State

== Home game attendance ==
Team	Stadium	Capacity	Game 1	Game 2	Game 3	Game 4	Game 5	Game 6	Game 7	Game 8	Total	Average	% of Capacity
Arizona	Arizona Stadium	50,800	46,275	41,211	36,591	**50,800†**	44,006	40,717	49,865	—	309,465	44,209	87.02%
Arizona State	Sun Devil Stadium	53,599	44,764	43,788	39,876	39,244	51,265†	39,551	—	—	258,448	43,081	80.37%
California	California Memorial Stadium	63,000	34,984	38,180	37,216	34,601	37,077	51,892†	36,221	—	270,171	38,596	61.26%
Colorado	Folsom Field	50,183	47,868	42,848	**50,471†**	40,334	42,089	33,474	—	—	257,084	42,847	85.38%
Oregon	Autzen Stadium	54,000	47,289	**54,463**	52,218	**59,962†**	**58,756**	**57,009**	—	—	329,697	54,950	101.75%
Oregon State	Reser Stadium‡	26,407	**27,732**	**28,768**	**28,735**	**27,679**	**28,642**	**43,363†**	—	—	184,919	30,820	116.71%
Stanford	Stanford Stadium	50,424	26,826	43,813†	32,482	25,061	26,515	25,094	—	—	179,791	29,965	59.42%
UCLA	Rose Bowl	80,816	27,143	33,727	29,344	41,343	42,038	43,850	44,430	70,865†	332,740	41,593	46.96%
USC	Los Angeles Memorial Coliseum	77,500	60,113	67,266	62,133	63,204	64,916	61,206	72,613†	—	451,411	64,487	83.20%
Utah	Rice–Eccles Stadium	51,444	**51,531**	**51,602**	**51,729**	**53,609†**	**51,919**	**51,951**	—	—	312,341	**52,057**	101.19%
Washington	Husky Stadium	70,083	56,112	57,518	68,161†	65,438	63,189	62,142	67,969	—	440,529	62,933	89.79%
Washington State	Martin Stadium	32,952	25,233	23,611	**33,058†**	23,021	21,179	24,039	33,152	—	180,293	26,185	79.46%
**Total**		55,100									3,506,889	44,391	80.56%

Bold – At or Exceed capacity
†Season High
‡Oregon State is renovating their stadium during the 2022 season reducing the capacity to 26,407.

== NFL draft ==
The following list includes all Pac-12 players who were drafted in the 2023 NFL draft.

Player	Position	School	Draft Round	Round Pick	Overall Pick	Team
Christian Gonzalez	CB	Oregon	1	17	17	New England Patriots
Jordan Addison	WR	USC	1	23	23	Minnesota Vikings
Dalton Kincaid	TE	Utah	1	25	25	Buffalo Bills
Luke Musgrave	TE	Oregon State	2	11	42	Green Bay Packers
Zach Charbonnet	RB	UCLA	2	21	52	Seattle Seahawks
Tuli Tuipulotu	LB	USC	2	23	54	Los Angeles Chargers
D. J. Johnson	LB	Oregon	3	17	80	Carolina Panthers
Daiyan Henley	LB	Washington State	3	22	85	Los Angeles Chargers
Michael Wilson	WR	Stanford	3	31	94	Arizona Cardinals
Mekhi Blackmon	CB	USC	3	39	102	Minnesota Vikings
Clark Phillips III	CB	Utah	4	11	113	Atlanta Falcons
Braeden Daniels	OG	Utah	4	16	118	Washington Commanders
Jon Gaines II	OG	UCLA	4	20	122	Arizona Cardinals
Dorian Thompson-Robinson	QB	UCLA	5	5	140	Cleveland Browns
Atonio Mafi	OG	UCLA	5	9	144	New England Patriots
Noah Sewell	LB	Oregon	5	13	148	Chicago Bears
Kyu Blu Kelly	CB	Stanford	5	22	157	Baltimore Ravens
Daniel Scott	S	California	5	23	158	Indianapolis Colts
Tanner McKee	QB	Stanford	6	11	188	Philadelphia Eagles
Elijah Higgins	WR	Stanford	6	20	197	Miami Dolphins
Malaesala Aumavae–Laulu	OT	Oregon	6	22	199	Baltimore Ravens
Andrew Vorhees	OG	USC	7	12	229	Baltimore Ravens
Nesta Jade Silvera	DT	Arizona State	7	14	231	Las Vegas Raiders
Jordon Riley	DT	Oregon	7	26	243	New York Giants
Alex Austin	CB	Oregon State	7	35	252	Buffalo Bills
Alex Forsyth	C	Oregon	7	40	257	Denver Broncos
Kendall Williamson	CB	Stanford	7	41	258	Chicago Bears

=== Total picks by school ===
Team	Round 1	Round 2	Round 3	Round 4	Round 5	Round 6	Round 7	Total
Arizona	0	0	0	0	0	0	0	0
Arizona State	0	0	0	0	0	0	1	1
California	0	0	0	0	1	0	0	1
Colorado	0	0	0	0	0	0	0	0
Oregon	1	0	1	0	1	1	2	6
Oregon State	0	1	0	0	0	0	1	2
Stanford	0	0	1	0	1	2	1	5
UCLA	0	1	0	1	2	0	0	4
USC	1	1	1	0	0	0	1	4
Utah	1	0	0	2	0	0	0	2
Washington	0	0	0	0	0	0	0	0
Washington State	0	0	1	0	0	0	0	1
Total	3	3	4	3	5	3	6	26
