= Jaydon Grant =

American football player (born 1998)

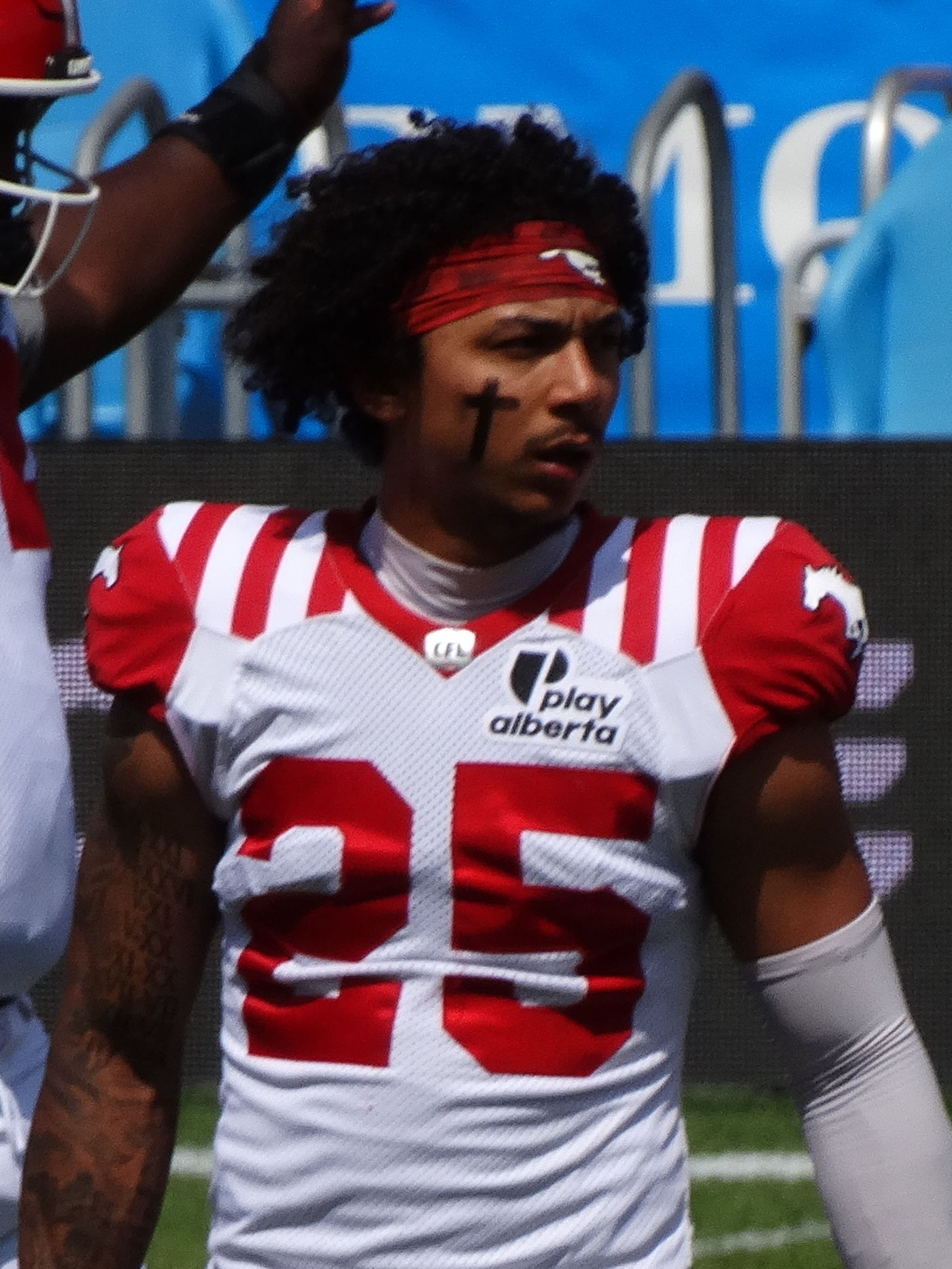
- Grant with the Calgary Stampeders in 2025

No. 25 – Calgary Stampeders
- Position: Defensive back
- Roster status: Active

Personal information
- Born: June 15, 1998 (age 28); Portland, Oregon, U.S.
- Listed height: 6 ft 0 in (1.83 m)
- Listed weight: 196 lb (89 kg)

Career information
- High school: West Linn (West Linn, Oregon)
- College: Oregon State (2016–2022)
- NFL draft: 2023: undrafted

Career history
- Las Vegas Raiders (2023–2024)*; Calgary Stampeders (2025–present)
- * Offseason or practice squad member only

Awards and highlights
- Second-team All-Pac-12 (2022)
- Stats at Pro Football Reference

Jaydon DeVon Grant (born June 15, 1998) is an American professional football defensive back for the Calgary Stampeders of the Canadian Football League (CFL). He played college football at Oregon State.

== Early life ==
Grant was born in Portland, Oregon, and attended West Linn High School in West Linn. In his high school career, he had 54 tackles, with one going for a loss, four interceptions, seven pass deflections, and a fumble recovery. Grant would decide to walk on to play college football at the Oregon State.

== College career ==
In Grant's first two seasons he only played in two games. In 2016 he missed the whole season due to a shoulder injury he suffered in training camp, and then in 2017 after just two games he underwent season-ending surgery on both shoulders. In those two games in 2017 he compiled three tackles. After coming off injury in the past two seasons, Grant played in six games in 2018, tallying 16 tackles and two pass deflections. After the conclusion of the 2018 season, Grant was awarded a scholarship. However, in a practice before the 2019 season, on March 14, 2019, Grant was hospitalized after colliding with a fence during an 11 on 11 drill. In week seven of the 2019 season, Grant intercepted a pass off quarterback Spencer Brasch with a little more than four minutes left, to help the Beavers seal the game and beat California. Grant finished the year playing in 11 games, and making 40 tackles, with 2.5 going for a loss, a sack, two interceptions, three pass deflections, a forced fumble, and a touchdown. In the 2020 shortened season, Grant played in seven games, racking up 29 tackles, two interceptions, and two pass deflections. In a Week 11 game against Stanford, Grant intercepted a pass to help Oregon State win 35-14 and become bowl eligible for the first time since 2013. Grant had a breakout season in 2021 finishing the year with 71 tackles, with three being for a loss, two interceptions, six pass deflections, and two forced fumbles. Grant opened up the 2022 season strong against Boise State, as he had four tackles, two pass deflections, a forced fumble, and an interception, to help the Beavers win their season opener 34–17. For his performance, he was named the Pac-12 defensive player of the week. Grant finished the 2022 season as the best of his career, where he put up 64 tackles, with 4.5 going for a loss, a sack, three interceptions, six pass deflections, and a forced fumble. For his performance he was named second team all Pac-12 and was presented the Thomas C. Hansen Conference medal, which is given to the school's top senior scholar-athletes.

Grant finished his Oregon State career with 223 tackles, with ten being for a loss, 2.5 sacks, nine interceptions, 19 pass deflections, four forced fumbles, and a touchdown.

== Professional career ==
Pre-draft measurables
Height	Weight	Arm length	Hand span	Wingspan	40-yard dash	10-yard split	20-yard split	20-yard shuttle	Three-cone drill	Vertical jump	Broad jump
5 ft 11 3/4 in (1.82 m)	190 lb (86 kg)	29 1/8 in (0.74 m)	9 1/4 in (0.23 m)	6 ft 0 1/2 in (1.84 m)	4.73 s	1.61 s	2.72 s	4.38 s	6.87 s	37.0 in (0.94 m)	9 ft 11 in (3.02 m)
All values from Pro Day

=== Las Vegas Raiders ===
After not being selected in the 2023 NFL draft, Grant signed with the Las Vegas Raiders as an undrafted free agent. He was waived on August 29, 2023, and re-signed to the practice squad. He signed a reserve/future contract on January 8, 2024.

On August 27, 2024, Grant was waived by the Raiders.

=== Calgary Stampeders ===
Grant signed with the Calgary Stampeders of the Canadian Football League on April 10, 2025.
