= Jaxson Kirkland =

American football player (born 1998)

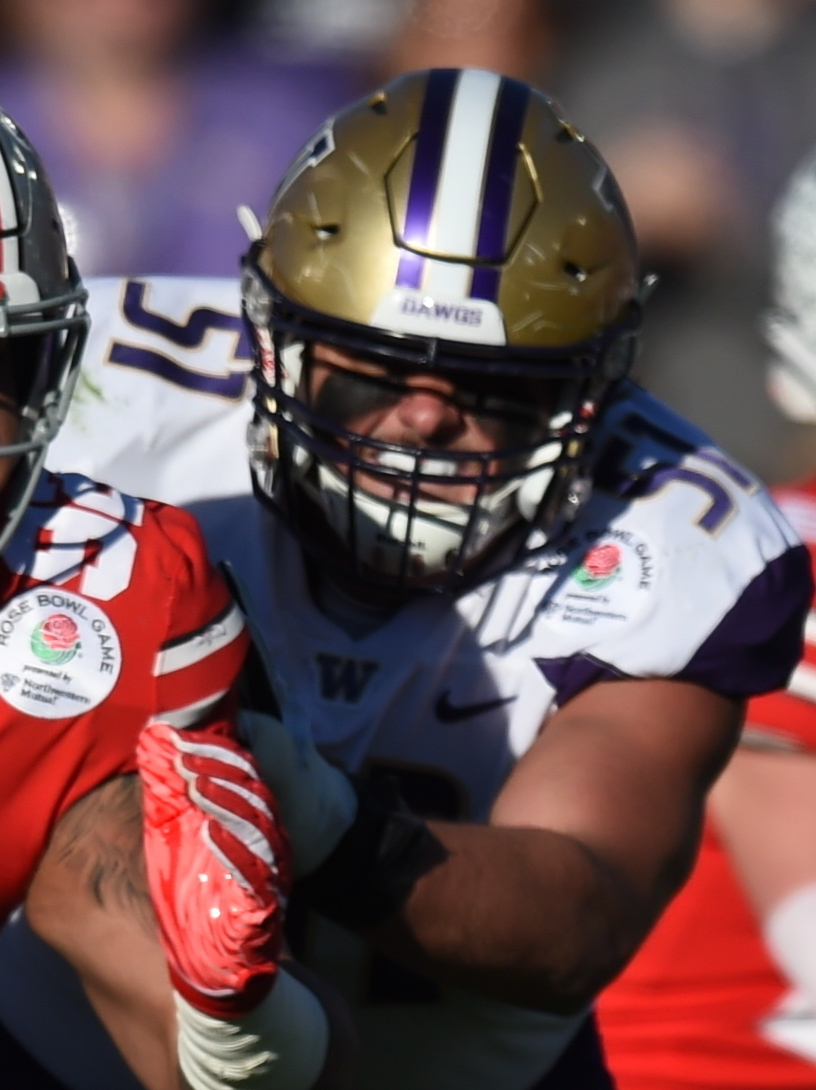
- Kirkland in the 2019 Rose Bowl

Profile
- Position: Offensive guard

Personal information
- Born: July 30, 1998 (age 28); Portland, Oregon, U.S.
- Listed height: 6 ft 7 in (2.01 m)
- Listed weight: 325 lb (147 kg)

Career information
- High school: Jesuit (Beaverton, Oregon)
- College: Washington (2017–2022)
- NFL draft: 2023: undrafted

Career history
- Cincinnati Bengals (2023–2025)

Awards and highlights
- 3× First-team All-Pac-12 (2020, 2021, 2022)

Career NFL statistics as of 2025
- Games played: 2
- Stats at Pro Football Reference

Jaxson Kirkland (born July 30, 1998) is an American professional football guard. He played college football for the Washington Huskies.

== Early life ==
Kirkland grew up in Camas, Washington and attended Jesuit High School. He was rated a three-star recruit and initially committed to play college football at UCLA during the summer before his senior year. Kirkland decommitted from UCLA at the end of his senior football season and ultimately signed a letter of intent to play at Washington over an offer from Oregon.

== College career ==
Kirkland redshirted his true freshman season at Washington. He was named the Huskies starting right guard going into his redshirt freshman season and started all 14 of the Huskies' games. Kirkland started the first 11 games of his redshirt sophomore season before sustaining an injury. He moved from right guard to left tackle going into the 2020 season and was named first team All-Pac-12 Conference. Kirkland considered entering the 2021 NFL draft, but opted to return to Washington for a fifth season. He entered his fifth season as one of the top offensive tackle prospects for the 2022 NFL Draft. Kirkland repeated as a first team All-Pac-12 selection after starting ten games with two games missed to an ankle injury in 2021 and declared for the 2022 NFL draft at the end of the season. He opted out of the draft after it was discovered that his ankle injury was more severe than previously thought.

== Professional career ==
Pre-draft measurables
Height	Weight	Arm length	Hand span	10-yard split	20-yard shuttle	Three-cone drill	Vertical jump	Broad jump	Bench press
6 ft 6 7/8 in (2.00 m)	321 lb (146 kg)	33 1/2 in (0.85 m)	10 1/2 in (0.27 m)	1.91 s	4.88 s	7.95 s	26.0 in (0.66 m)	8 ft 3 in (2.51 m)	20 reps
All values from NFL Combine/Pro Day

Kirkland was signed by the Cincinnati Bengals as an undrafted free agent on May 12, 2023. On August 29, he was waived by the Bengals as part of final roster cuts and re-signed to the practice squad the following day. Following the end of the 2023 regular season, the Bengals signed him to a reserve/future contract on January 8, 2024.

Kirkland made the Bengals' initial roster in 2024 as a backup offensive lineman, but suffered a biceps injury in Week 5 and was placed on injured reserve on October 8, 2024.

On August 26, 2025, Kirkland was waived by the Bengals as part of final roster cuts and re-signed to the practice squad the following day.
