= Jack Colletto =

American football player (born 1998)

Profile
- Position: Fullback

Personal information
- Born: November 19, 1998 (age 27); Camas, Washington, U.S.
- Listed height: 6 ft 3 in (1.91 m)
- Listed weight: 237 lb (108 kg)

Career information
- High school: Camas
- College: Arizona Western (2017); Oregon State (2018–2022)
- NFL draft: 2023: undrafted

Career history
- San Francisco 49ers (2023)*; Pittsburgh Steelers (2023–2024)*
- * Offseason or practice squad member only

Awards and highlights
- Paul Hornung Award (2022); First-team All-Pac-12 (2022); Second-team All-Pac-12 (2021)
- Stats at Pro Football Reference

Jack Colletto (born November 19, 1998) is an American professional football fullback. He played college football for the Arizona Western Matadors and Oregon State Beavers and was signed by the San Francisco 49ers after going undrafted in the 2023 NFL draft.

== Early life ==
Colletto grew up in Camas, Washington and attended Camas High School, where he played baseball, basketball, and football. He was named the Washington Gatorade Player of the Year as a senior after passing for 2,846 yards and 27 touchdowns while also rushing for 1,253 yards and 21 touchdowns. While Colletto was recruited by some Division I schools, he opted to enroll at Arizona Western College.

== College career ==
Colletto began his college career at Arizona Western College. As a freshman, he completed 39-of-67 pass attempts for 548 yards and four touchdowns and rushed 43 times for 185 yards and nine touchdowns. Colletto committed to transfer to Oregon State after his freshman season.

Colletto spent his first season primarily as the Beavers' backup quarterback and was used in short-yardage situations. He made one start, which was a 41–34 win over Colorado in which he completed six of 14 pass attempts for 35 yards and one interception and ran for two touchdowns. Colletto was moved to linebacker during spring practices in 2019. He played in four games before redshirting the season, playing both linebacker and also seeing time as a rushing quarterback. Colletto continued to play linebacker as well as fullback as a redshirt junior. He was named second team All-Pac-12 Conference in 2021 after rushing for 144 yards and eight touchdowns and making eight tackles with one forced fumble and an interception on defense. Colletto won the Paul Hornung Award as the most versatile player in college football in 2022.

== Professional career ==
Pre-draft measurables
Height	Weight	Arm length	Hand span	Wingspan	40-yard dash	10-yard split	20-yard split	20-yard shuttle	Three-cone drill	Vertical jump	Broad jump	Bench press
6 ft 2 5/8 in (1.90 m)	237 lb (108 kg)	31 1/4 in (0.79 m)	9 7/8 in (0.25 m)	6 ft 4 in (1.93 m)	4.85 s	1.65 s	2.75 s	4.43 s	7.31 s	36.5 in (0.93 m)	9 ft 10 in (3.00 m)	17 reps
All values from Pro Day

=== San Francisco 49ers ===
Colletto was signed by the San Francisco 49ers as an undrafted free agent on May 1, 2023. He was waived on August 29, 2023, and re-signed to the practice squad. He was released on October 4.

=== Pittsburgh Steelers ===
On October 9, 2023, Colletto was signed to the Pittsburgh Steelers practice squad. On January 17, 2024, he signed a reserve/futures contract with the Steelers. He was waived on August 27, and re-signed to the practice squad. He was released on October 1.
