= Brian Kelly (cornerback) =

American football player (born 1976)

No. 25
- Position: Cornerback

Personal information
- Born: January 14, 1976 (age 50); Las Vegas, Nevada, U.S.
- Listed height: 5 ft 11 in (1.80 m)
- Listed weight: 193 lb (88 kg)

Career information
- High school: Overland (Aurora, Colorado)
- College: USC
- NFL draft: 1998: 2nd round, 45th overall pick

Career history
- Tampa Bay Buccaneers (1998–2007); Detroit Lions (2008)

Awards and highlights
- Super Bowl champion (XXXVII); NFL interceptions co-leader (2002); First-team All-Pac-10 (1997)

Career NFL statistics
- Tackles: 426
- Sacks: 3.5
- Forced fumbles: 2
- Fumble recoveries: 5
- Interceptions: 22
- Defensive touchdowns: 1
- Stats at Pro Football Reference

Brian Patrick Kelly (born January 14, 1976) is an American former professional football player who was a cornerback in the National Football League (NFL). He played college football for the USC Trojans and was selected by the Tampa Bay Buccaneers in the second round of the 1998 NFL draft. Kelly earned a Super Bowl ring with the Buccaneers in Super Bowl XXXVII and also played for the Detroit Lions. His son, Kyu Blu Kelly, is currently playing in the NFL.

== Early life ==
Kelly is a high school graduate from Overland High School in Aurora, Colorado. Overland won the 1993 6A state championship in his senior year.

== College career ==
Kelly graduated from the University of Southern California in 1997.

== Professional career ==
Pre-draft measurables
Height	Weight	Arm length	Hand span	20-yard shuttle	Three-cone drill	Vertical jump	Broad jump	Bench press
5 ft 11 1/8 in (1.81 m)	192 lb (87 kg)	32 1/8 in (0.82 m)	9 1/8 in (0.23 m)	3.82 s	7.25 s	33.5 in (0.85 m)	10 ft 0 in (3.05 m)	8 reps
All values from the NFL Combine

=== Tampa Bay Buccaneers ===
Kelly was drafted by the Tampa Bay Buccaneers in the 2nd round of the 1998 NFL draft. In 2002, he helped the Bucs win the Super Bowl, during that same season he had 8 interceptions, which tied for the league lead along with Rod Woodson. On February 15, 2008, he exercised a buyout option in his contract and became a free agent.

=== Detroit Lions ===
On March 8, 2008, he signed a three-year deal with the Detroit Lions. He appeared in 11 games (all starts) for the Lions in 2008, recording 26 tackles and a pass defensed. The team released him on December 9 after signing cornerback Dexter Wynn.

=== NFL statistics ===
Year	Team	Games		Tackles					Interceptions						Fumbles	
Year	Team	GP	GS	Cmb	Solo	Ast	Sck	Sfty	PD	Int	Yds	Avg	Lng	TD	FF	FR
1998	TB	16	3	27	25	2	0.0	0	5	1	4	4	4	0	0	1
1999	TB	16	3	34	29	5	0.0	0	12	1	26	26	26	0	0	0
2000	TB	16	3	48	44	4	0.0	0	11	1	9	9	9	1	0	2
2001	TB	16	11	57	46	11	1.5	0	4	0	0	0	0	0	0	0
2002	TB	16	16	65	57	8	1.0	0	21	8	68	9	31	0	1	0
2003	TB	5	5	15	13	2	0.0	0	5	1	0	0	0	0	0	0
2004	TB	16	16	58	51	7	0.0	0	21	4	101	25	75	0	0	1
2005	TB	16	16	50	41	9	1.0	0	17	4	19	5	14	0	1	0
2006	TB	2	2	12	11	1	0.0	0	0	0	0	0	0	0	0	0
2007	TB	11	4	21	19	2	0.0	0	7	2	0	0	0	0	0	1
2008	DET	11	10	26	23	3	0.0	0	1	0	0	0	0	0	0	0
Career		141	89	413	359	54	3.5	0	104	22	227	10.0	75	1	2	5
Source: pro-football-reference.com

== Personal life ==
Kelly's son, Kyu Blu Kelly, played cornerback at Stanford and was drafted by the Baltimore Ravens in the 2023 NFL draft.
