= Brennan Jackson =

American football player (born 2000)

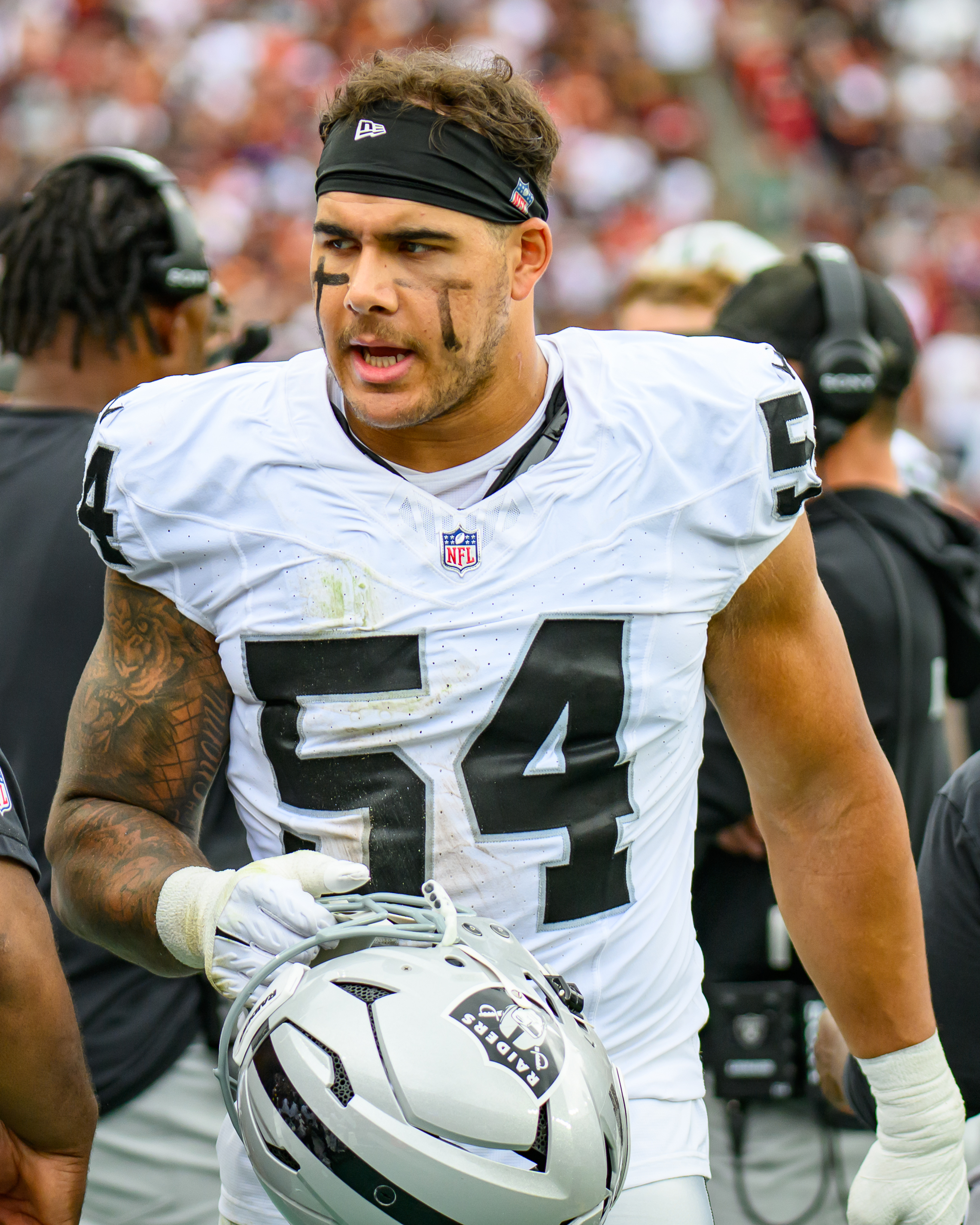
- Jackson with the Las Vegas Raiders in 2025

No. 54 – Las Vegas Raiders
- Position: Linebacker
- Roster status: Injured reserve

Personal information
- Born: October 14, 2000 (age 26); Montgomery, Ohio, U.S.
- Listed height: 6 ft 4 in (1.93 m)
- Listed weight: 263 lb (119 kg)

Career information
- High school: Great Oak (Temecula, California)
- College: Washington State (2018–2023)
- NFL draft: 2024: 5th round, 154th overall pick

Career history
- Los Angeles Rams (2024); Las Vegas Raiders (2025–present)

Awards and highlights
- 2× Second-team All-Pac-12 (2022, 2023)

Career NFL statistics as of 2025
- Total tackles: 6
- Pass deflections: 1
- Stats at Pro Football Reference

Brennan Jackson (born October 14, 2000) is an American professional football linebacker for the Las Vegas Raiders of the National Football League (NFL). He played college football for the Washington State Cougars.

== Early life ==
Jackson attended Great Oak High School in Temecula, California. He played on both offense and defense on the football team. On offense he caught 12 passes for 193 yards. On defense he racked up 150 tackles with 21 going for a loss, six sacks, two pass deflection, a fumble recovery, and three forced fumbles. Jackson committed to play college football at Washington State over other schools such as Arizona, California, and Hawaii.

== College career ==
As a freshman in 2019, Jackson recorded one tackle, and 0.5 tackles for loss. In the 2020 season opener, he racked up seven tackles and 0.5 sacks in a 38–28 win over Oregon State. Jackson finished the 2020 season with 19 tackles with 3.5 being for a loss, 1.5 sacks, and a forced fumble. In week five of the 2022 season, Jackson had a career day posting four tackles, two sacks, and a pass deflection, as he would help Washington State beat California 21–6. He was named the Pac-12 defensive lineman of the week, being the first Washington State player to receive the award. The following week, Jackson recorded his first career interception off a tipped ball thrown by Chance Nolan, helping the Cougars defeat Oregon State 31-24. In the next week in week seven, Jackson tallied six tackles, a sack, and the game-winning fumble recovery, as he helped the Cougars beat Stanford 34–31. He was again named the Pac-12 defensive lineman of the week. Jackson finished the 2021 season with 43 tackles with 6.5 of them going for a loss, 4.5 sacks, two pass deflections, an interception, and a fumble recovery. In week eleven of the 2022 season, Jackson put up five tackles, two sacks, and a forced fumble on quarterback Trenton Bourguet, helping Washington State beat Arizona State 28-18 and become bowl eligible. For his performance, Jackson earned the Pac-12 defensive lineman of the week honors. Jackson finished the 2022 season with 41 tackles with 12 being for a loss, six sacks, three pass deflections, and a forced fumble. For his performance, Jackson was named second-team all Pac-12. Jackson was named second-team all Pac-12 ahead of the 2023 season. Jackson was also named to the Bronko Nagurski Trophy watch list, which is awarded to the nation's best defensive player.

== Professional career ==
Pre-draft measurables
Height	Weight	Arm length	Hand span	Wingspan	40-yard dash	10-yard split	20-yard split	20-yard shuttle	Three-cone drill	Vertical jump	Broad jump	Bench press
6 ft 3 7/8 in (1.93 m)	264 lb (120 kg)	32 3/4 in (0.83 m)	9 3/4 in (0.25 m)	6 ft 6 3/4 in (2.00 m)	4.69 s	1.62 s	2.72 s	4.34 s	7.43 s	33.5 in (0.85 m)	9 ft 6 in (2.90 m)	26 reps
All values from NFL Combine/Pro Day

=== Los Angeles Rams ===
Jackson was drafted by the Los Angeles Rams in the fifth round, 154th overall, of the 2024 NFL draft.

On August 26, 2025, Jackson was waived by the Rams as part of final roster cuts.

=== Las Vegas Raiders ===
On August 27, 2025, Jackson was claimed off waivers by the Las Vegas Raiders. He was placed on injured reserve on August 15, 2026.

== NFL career statistics ==
Legend
**Bold**	Career high

=== Regular season ===
Year	Team	Games		Tackles					Interceptions						Fumbles				
Year	Team	GP	GS	Cmb	Solo	Ast	Sck	TFL	Int	Yds	Avg	Lng	TD	PD	FF	Fum	FR	Yds	TD
2024	LAR	**7**	**1**	**3**	**2**	**1**	0.0	0	0	0	0.0	0	0	**1**	0	0	0	0	0
2025	LV	3	0	**3**	**2**	**1**	0.0	0	0	0	0.0	0	0	0	0	0	0	0	0
Career		10	1	6	4	2	0.0	0	0	0	0.0	0	0	1	0	0	0	0	0
