= Kyu Blu Kelly =

American football player (born 2001)

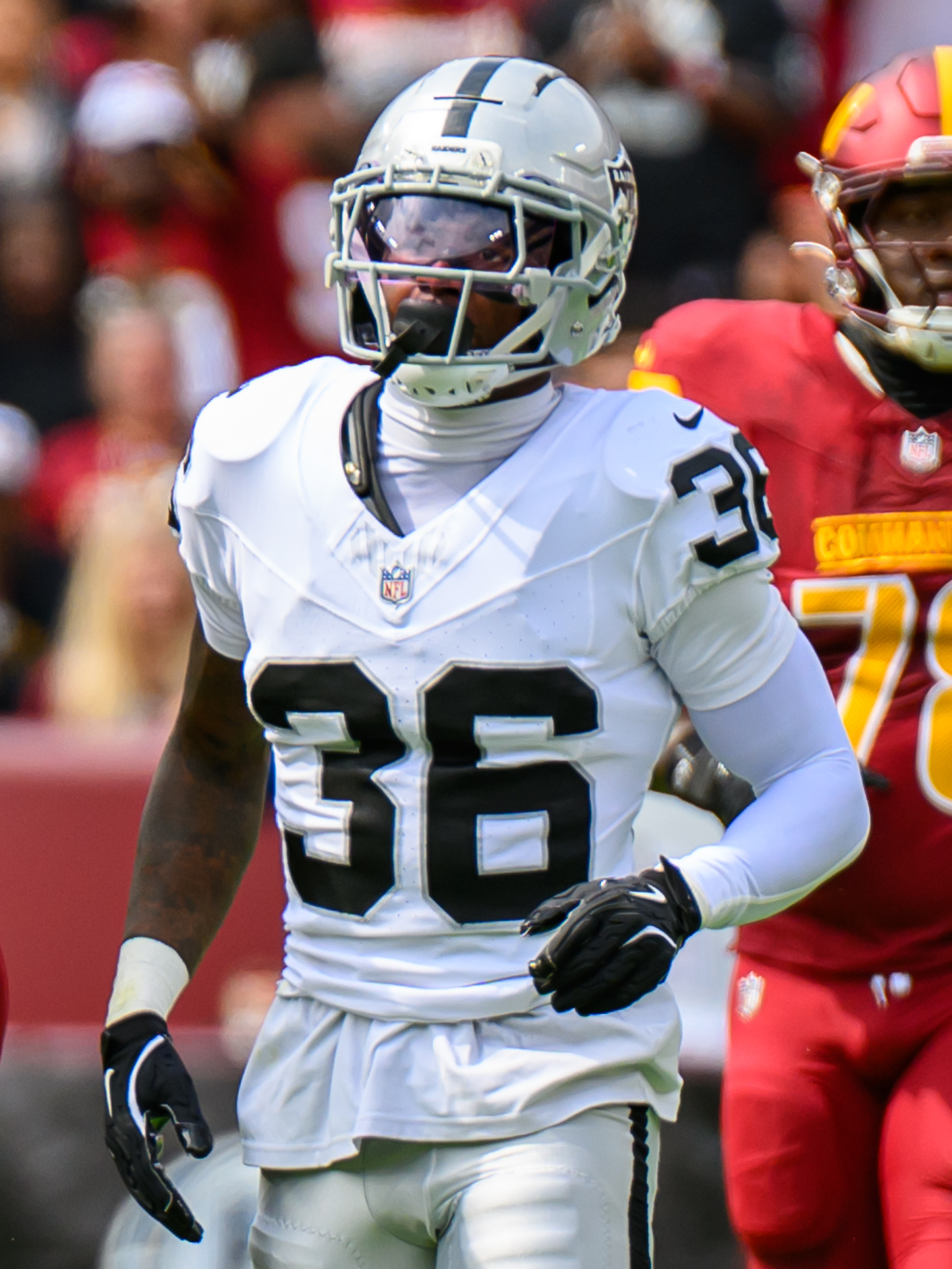
- Kelly with the Las Vegas Raiders in 2025

No. 38 – Los Angeles Chargers
- Position: Cornerback
- Roster status: Practice squad

Personal information
- Born: May 22, 2001 (age 25); Las Vegas, Nevada, U.S.
- Listed height: 6 ft 0 in (1.83 m)
- Listed weight: 188 lb (85 kg)

Career information
- High school: Bishop Gorman (Las Vegas)
- College: Stanford (2019–2022)
- NFL draft: 2023: 5th round, 157th overall pick

Career history
- Baltimore Ravens (2023)*; Seattle Seahawks (2023); Green Bay Packers (2023); Washington Commanders (2023); Las Vegas Raiders (2024–2025); Los Angeles Chargers (2026–present)*
- * Offseason or practice squad member only

Awards and highlights
- 2× second-team All-Pac-12 (2021, 2022)

Career NFL statistics as of 2025
- Total tackles: 47
- Fumble recoveries: 1
- Pass deflections: 6
- Interceptions: 3
- Stats at Pro Football Reference

Kyu Blu Kelly (born May 22, 2001) is an American professional football cornerback for the Los Angeles Chargers of the National Football League (NFL). He played college football for the Stanford Cardinal and was selected by the Baltimore Ravens in the fifth round of the 2023 NFL draft. Kelly is the son of former NFL player Brian Kelly.

== Early life ==
Kelly grew up in Las Vegas, Nevada, and attended Bishop Gorman High School. He was named first team All-State as a senior. Kelly was rated a three-star recruit and committed to play college football at Stanford over offers from Arizona State, Cal, UCLA, Oregon, and Utah.

== College career ==
Kelly became a starter four games into his freshman season. He was named honorable mention All-Pac-12 Conference as a sophomore. Kelly was named second team All-Pac-12 after making 58 tackles with a league-high 13 passes defended and two interceptions during his junior season. He repeated as a second team All-Pac-12 selection as a senior. After the season, Kelly announced that he would enter the 2023 NFL draft.

== Professional career ==
Pre-draft measurables
Height	Weight	Arm length	Hand span	40-yard dash	10-yard split	20-yard split	20-yard shuttle	Three-cone drill	Vertical jump	Broad jump
6 ft 0 1/4 in (1.84 m)	191 lb (87 kg)	32 in (0.81 m)	9 3/4 in (0.25 m)	4.52 s	1.49 s	2.56 s	4.35 s	6.93 s	36.0 in (0.91 m)	10 ft 11 in (3.33 m)

=== Baltimore Ravens ===
Kelly was selected by the Baltimore Ravens in the fifth round (157th overall) of the 2023 NFL draft. He was waived by Baltimore as part of final roster cuts on August 29, 2023.

=== Seattle Seahawks ===
On August 30, 2023, Kelly was claimed off waivers by the Seattle Seahawks. He was waived by the Seahawks on November 11.

=== Green Bay Packers ===
On November 15, 2023, Kelly was claimed off waivers by the Green Bay Packers. On December 12, Kelly was released by the Packers.

=== Washington Commanders ===
On December 13, 2023, Kelly was claimed off waivers by the Washington Commanders. He was released by the Commanders as a part of roster cuts on August 27, 2024.

=== Las Vegas Raiders ===
On September 10, 2024, Kelly was signed to the Las Vegas Raiders' practice squad. He was promoted to the active roster on December 21.

On November 6, 2025, Kelly recorded his first two career interceptions in the Raiders' Week 10 matchup against the Denver Broncos; however, the Raiders would still go on to lose the game, 7–10. During a December 7 matchup against Denver, Kelly suffered a torn patellar tendon, necessitating a placement on season-ending injured reserve the following day.

=== Los Angeles Chargers ===
On November 11, 2026, Kelly signed with the Los Angeles Chargers practice squad.

== NFL career statistics ==
Legend
**Bold**	Career high

=== Regular season ===
Year	Team	Games		Tackles					Interceptions						Fumbles				
Year	Team	GP	GS	Cmb	Solo	Ast	Sck	TFL	Int	Yds	Avg	Lng	TD	PD	FF	Fum	FR	Yds	TD
2023	GB	1	0	0	0	0	0.0	0	0	0	0.0	0	0	0	0	0	0	0	0
2023	SEA	5	0	0	0	0	0.0	0	0	0	0.0	0	0	0	0	0	0	0	0
2023	WAS	2	0	5	5	0	0.0	**1**	0	0	0.0	0	0	0	0	0	0	0	0
2024	LV	4	0	2	1	1	0.0	0	0	0	0.0	0	0	0	0	0	0	0	0
2025	LV	**13**	**8**	**40**	**31**	**9**	0.0	**1**	**3**	**26**	**8.7**	**26**	0	**6**	0	0	**1**	**3**	0
Career		25	8	47	37	10	0.0	2	3	26	8.7	26	0	6	0	0	1	3	0

== Personal life ==
Kelly's father, Brian Kelly, played in the NFL for 11 seasons.
