= Jeremiah Martin (American football) =

American football player (born 1999)

Rhode Island Breakers
- Position: Defensive end
- Roster status: Unsigned draft pick

Personal information
- Born: July 10, 1999 (age 27); San Bernardino, California, U.S.
- Listed height: 6 ft 3 in (1.91 m)
- Listed weight: 265 lb (120 kg)

Career information
- High school: Cajon (San Bernardino)
- College: Texas A&M (2018–2020); Washington (2021–2022)
- NFL draft: 2023: undrafted

Career history
- Cleveland Browns (2023)*; New York Giants (2023–2024)*; Cleveland Browns (2024)*; Arlington Renegades (2024)*; Birmingham Stallions (2024)*; Green Bay Packers (2024)*; New Orleans Saints (2025)*; Chicago Bears (2025–2026)*; Rhode Island Breakers (2027-present)
- * Offseason or practice squad member only

Awards and highlights
- First-team All-Pac-12 (2022)
- Stats at Pro Football Reference

Jeremiah Martin (born July 10, 1999) is an American professional football defensive end. He played college football for the Texas A&M Aggies and Washington Huskies.

== Early life ==
Martin grew up in San Bernardino, California, and attended Cajon High School, where he played football. As a senior, he put up 89 tackles, 30.5 sacks, four forced fumbles, and four fumble recoveries. For his performance he was named first-team all-state and The San Bernardino Sun area defensive player of the year. A four-star recruit, Martin committed to play college football at Texas A&M.

== College career ==
Martin would play three years for Texas A&M. In those three years he only played in 9 games totaling 11 tackles, with three of them going for a loss. After the conclusion of the 2020 season, Martin announced that he had decided to transfer to Washington. In Martin's first season with the Huskies he played in 9 games, while racking up 13 tackles, one going for a loss, and a sack. However the 2022 season was Martin's best, starting before the season even started he was voted a team captain. In the 2022 season he made 41 tackles, 11 being for a loss, eight and a half sacks, a pass deflections, and two forced fumbles. His efforts would pay off as he finished the year as a first team All-Pac-12.

== Professional career ==
Pre-draft measurables
Height	Weight	Arm length	Hand span	Wingspan	40-yard dash	10-yard split	20-yard split	20-yard shuttle	Three-cone drill	Vertical jump	Broad jump	Bench press
6 ft 3 3/8 in (1.91 m)	265 lb (120 kg)	34 1/8 in (0.87 m)	9 5/8 in (0.24 m)	6 ft 11 1/4 in (2.11 m)	4.90 s	1.71 s	2.82 s	4.52 s	7.09 s	35.5 in (0.90 m)	9 ft 11 in (3.02 m)	20 reps
All values from Pro Day

=== Cleveland Browns (first stint) ===
After not being selected in the 2023 NFL draft, Martin signed with the Cleveland Browns as an undrafted free agent. He was waived on August 29, 2023.

=== New York Giants ===
On January 1, 2024, Martin was signed to the practice squad of the New York Giants. Following the end of the 2023 regular season, the Giants signed him to a reserve/future contract on January 8. On May 13, Martin was waived by the Giants.

=== Cleveland Browns (second stint) ===
On July 24, 2024, Martin signed with the Browns. He was waived by Cleveland on August 26.

=== Birmingham Stallions ===
On November 4, 2024, Martin was signed by the Arlington Renegades and immediately traded to the Birmingham Stallions of the United Football League (UFL).

=== Green Bay Packers ===
On December 11, 2024, Martin signed with the Green Bay Packers practice squad. He signed a reserve/future contract with Green Bay on January 13, 2025. On May 29, Martin was waived with an injury designation by the Packers.

=== New Orleans Saints ===
On August 14, 2025, Martin signed with the New Orleans Saints. He was waived by the Saints on August 25.

=== Chicago Bears ===
On November 24, 2025, Martin signed to the Chicago Bears' practice squad. On January 20, 2026, he signed a reserve/futures contract with Chicago. On August 30, Martin was waived by the Bears.
