= Braeden Daniels =

American football player (born 2000)

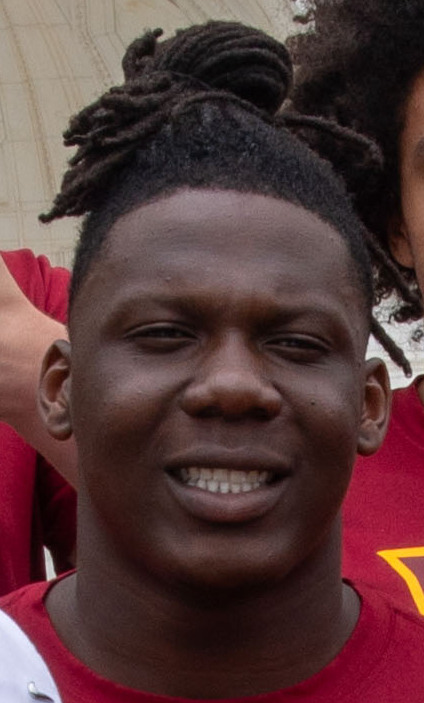
- Daniels with the Washington Commanders in 2023

Profile
- Position: Offensive tackle

Personal information
- Born: August 22, 2000 (age 26); Carrollton, Texas, U.S.
- Listed height: 6 ft 4 in (1.93 m)
- Listed weight: 305 lb (138 kg)

Career information
- High school: Hebron (Carrollton)
- College: Utah (2018–2022)
- NFL draft: 2023: 4th round, 118th overall pick

Career history
- Washington Commanders (2023); Houston Texans (2024)*; Los Angeles Chargers (2024)*; Philadelphia Eagles (2024)*; Dallas Cowboys (2024)*; Miami Dolphins (2024–2025); Las Vegas Raiders (2026)*
- * Offseason or practice squad member only

Awards and highlights
- First-team All-Pac-12 (2022); Second-team All-Pac-12 (2021)
- Stats at Pro Football Reference

Braeden Edward Daniels (BRAY-dən; born August 22, 2000) is an American professional football offensive tackle. He played college football for the Utah Utes and was selected by the Washington Commanders in the fourth round of the 2023 NFL draft.

== Early life ==
Daniels was born on August 22, 2000, in Carrollton, Texas. He attended Hebron High School, where he played football, javelin throw, discus throw, and shot put, earning all-district honors for the latter. Rated a three-star recruit, Daniels initially committed to play college football at Illinois before switching his commitment to Utah.

== College career ==
Daniels played in two games during his true freshman season at Utah before redshirting the year. He became the Utes' starting left guard going into his redshirt freshman season. He moved to right tackle two games into his redshirt junior season and was named second team All-Pac-12 Conference. Daniels was named first team All-Pac-12 as a redshirt senior.

== Professional career ==
Pre-draft measurables
Height	Weight	Arm length	Hand span	Wingspan	40-yard dash	10-yard split	20-yard split	20-yard shuttle	Three-cone drill	Vertical jump	Broad jump
6 ft 3 5/8 in (1.92 m)	294 lb (133 kg)	33 in (0.84 m)	9 3/8 in (0.24 m)	6 ft 9 7/8 in (2.08 m)	4.99 s	1.71 s	2.86 s	4.60 s	7.53 s	30.5 in (0.77 m)	9 ft 1 in (2.77 m)
All values from NFL Combine

=== Washington Commanders ===
Daniels was selected by the Washington Commanders in the fourth round (118th overall) of the 2023 NFL draft. He signed his four-year rookie contract on May 19, 2023. He was placed on injured reserve on August 28 due to a torn rotator cuff.

On August 27, 2024, Daniels was waived by the Commanders as part of final roster cuts.

=== Houston Texans ===
On August 29, 2024, Daniels signed with the practice squad of the Houston Texans. He was released on September 17.

=== Los Angeles Chargers ===
On September 26, 2024, Daniels was signed to the Los Angeles Chargers' practice squad and released five days later.

=== Philadelphia Eagles ===
On October 30, 2024, Daniels was signed to the Philadelphia Eagles' practice squad, but was released a week later.

=== Dallas Cowboys ===
On December 12, 2024, Daniels signed with the Dallas Cowboys' practice squad.

=== Miami Dolphins ===
On January 1, 2025, Daniels was signed by the Miami Dolphins off the Cowboys' practice squad.

On August 26, 2025, Daniels was waived by the Dolphins as part of final roster cuts and re-signed to the practice squad the next day. He was released on December 2.

On January 9, 2026, Daniels signed a reserve/futures contract with the Dolphins. On May 21, he was waived by Miami.

=== Las Vegas Raiders ===
On August 12, 2026, Daniels signed with the Las Vegas Raiders. He was waived by the Raiders as a part of final roster cuts on August 30.

== Personal life ==
Daniels mother, Yronica, earned first-team All-Southland honors in 1987 while playing for the McNeese Cowgirls basketball team at McNeese State University.
