= Atonio Mafi =

American football player (born 2000)

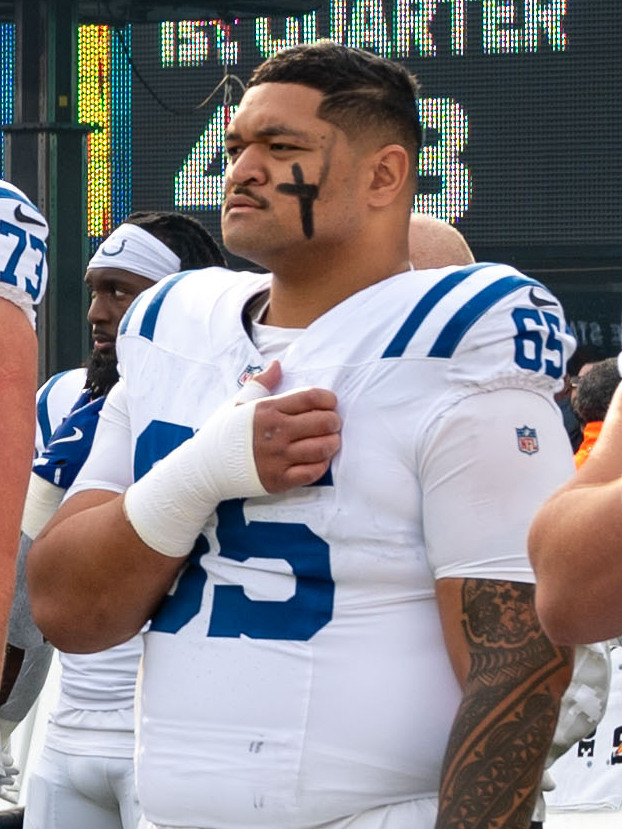
- Mafi with the Indianapolis Colts in 2024

No. 70 – Tennessee Titans
- Position: Guard
- Roster status: Active

Personal information
- Born: October 20, 2000 (age 26); San Mateo, California, U.S.
- Listed height: 6 ft 3 in (1.91 m)
- Listed weight: 330 lb (150 kg)

Career information
- High school: Junípero Serra (San Mateo)
- College: UCLA (2018–2022)
- NFL draft: 2023: 5th round, 144th overall pick

Career history
- New England Patriots (2023); Indianapolis Colts (2024); Las Vegas Raiders (2025–2026); Tennessee Titans (2026–present)

Awards and highlights
- Second-team All-Pac-12 (2022)

Career NFL statistics as of 2025
- Games played: 23
- Games started: 7
- Stats at Pro Football Reference

Atonio Mafi (born October 20, 2000) is an American professional football guard for the Tennessee Titans of the National Football League (NFL). He played college football for the UCLA Bruins and was selected in the fifth round (144th overall) of the 2023 NFL draft by the New England Patriots.

== Early life ==
Mafi was born on October 20, 2000, and is of Tongan descent. He grew up playing rugby before later switching to football. He attended Junípero Serra High School in San Mateo, California, and played football on both sides of the ball, being ranked a three-star prospect and a top-130 player in California, according to ESPN. He was named Central Coast Section Co-Offensive Player of the Year, WCAL most valuable player, and first-team All-CIF, eventually committing to play college football at UCLA after flipping from California.

== College career ==
Recruited to UCLA to play on the defensive line, Mafi was measured at 411 pounds when he first entered the school. He had a jersey sized XXXXL, a size 50 waist, and 40% body fat. One of his favorite meals at the time consisted of five beef patties with cheese, a double order of fries and a milkshake, which totaled 177 grams of fat and 3,240 calories, over 150% the daily recommended intake. He was told he needed to lose weight to have a chance to play, and was able to drop to 390 by the time the season started. Mafi won the starting job and was the only true freshman starting on the defensive line. He appeared in 12 games on the year, starting nine, and recorded 16 tackles at nose tackle.

Mafi slimmed down to 357 by the beginning of the 2019 season, and posted 28 tackles, including four TFLs, one sack and one forced fumble while appearing in 12 games, five of which he started. He moved to the offensive line in 2020 and saw limited action in seven games as a reserve. The following year, Mafi played 12 games, three as a starter.

As Mafi entered his final year in 2022, he weighed at 377 pounds. He was told he again needed to lose weight, with his coach saying, "If you lose the weight, you'll have a shot." Mafi went on a diet and exercise plan and was eventually able to go down to 340 by the time the season started. He ended up starting all 13 games and was named second-team all-conference in the Pac-12. He finished his stint at UCLA with 56 games played, tying the school record.

== Professional career ==
Pre-draft measurables
Height	Weight	Bench press
6 ft 2 3/4 in (1.90 m)	338 lb (153 kg)	21 reps
All values from Pro Day

Prior to the 2023 NFL draft, the Los Angeles Times published a weekly diary written by Mafi.

=== New England Patriots ===
Projected as going between the fourth and sixth rounds of the 2023 NFL draft, he was eventually chosen by the New England Patriots with the 144th pick in the fifth round.

Mafi was waived by the Patriots on August 27, 2024.

=== Indianapolis Colts ===
On August 29, 2024, Mafi was signed to the Indianapolis Colts practice squad. He was promoted to the active roster on November 30. He was waived on December 23, and re-signed to the practice squad.

Mafi signed a reserve/future contract with Indianapolis on January 6, 2025. On May 9, Mafi was waived by the Colts.

=== Las Vegas Raiders ===
On July 22, 2025, Mafi signed with the Las Vegas Raiders. He was waived on August 26 as part of final roster cuts and re-signed to the practice squad the next day. On November 17, Mafi was signed to the active roster.

On September 10, 2026, Mafi was waived by the Raiders.

=== Tennessee Titans ===
On September 11, 2026, Mafi was claimed off of waivers by the Tennessee Titans.
