= Jon Gaines II =

American football player (born 1999)

No. 71 – Arizona Cardinals
- Positions: Center, guard
- Roster status: Active

Personal information
- Born: May 24, 1999 (age 27); Wauwatosa, Wisconsin, U.S.
- Listed height: 6 ft 4 in (1.93 m)
- Listed weight: 320 lb (145 kg)

Career information
- High school: Marquette University High (Milwaukee, Wisconsin)
- College: UCLA (2018–2022)
- NFL draft: 2023: 4th round, 122nd overall pick

Career history
- Arizona Cardinals (2023–present)

Career NFL statistics as of Week 5, 2026
- Games played: 35
- Games started: 7
- Stats at Pro Football Reference

Jon Gaines II (born May 24, 1999) is an American professional American football center and guard for the Arizona Cardinals of the National Football League (NFL). He played college football for the UCLA Bruins.

== Early life ==
Gaines was born in Wauwatosa, Wisconsin. He attended Marquette University High School, and participated in football and track and field. Playing tackle in football, he team captain, a Wisconsin Football Coaches Association All-State honorable mention in 2017 and was ranked the tenth-best player in the state as a three-star recruit. The 128th-best ranked tackle nationally, Gaines chose to commit to UCLA over offers from Northern Illinois, California, Iowa and Purdue.

== College career ==
As a true freshman at UCLA in 2018, Gaines appeared in one match, the season finale against Stanford. He began seeing regular action as a redshirt freshman in 2019, appearing in every game with a single start. He helped block for 1,000-yard rusher Joshua Kelley that season and contributed to the team's streak of five consecutive 200-yard rushing games, the first time they had accomplished this in over 40 years. During the COVID-19-shortened 2020 season, Gaines started four out of seven games.

Gaines became a full-time starter in 2021, and started games at each of the three line positions (tackle, guard, center). He played a major role in Zach Charbonnet's 1000-yard season that year, as well as the school's leading of the Pac-12 Conference in rushing yards-per-game. As a senior in 2022, he was key in Charbonnet's second 1000-yard season and helped UCLA lead the conference in yards-per-carry. A starter in every game, Gaines also appeared on all 932 snaps at right guard, and was a member of a line that was a semifinalist for the Joe Moore Award. He was an honorable mention all-conference choice and announced after the year that he was foregoing his final year of eligibility to enter the NFL draft and play in the NFLPA Collegiate Bowl. He finished his stint at UCLA having appeared on 2,382 snaps, and only allowed five total sacks and 52 pressures.

== Professional career ==
Gaines was invited to the NFL Scouting Combine and posted the best short shuttle among its participants. He was projected as being selected between the third and fifth rounds of the 2023 NFL draft.

Pre-draft measurables
| Height | Weight | Arm length | Hand span | Wingspan | 40-yard dash | 10-yard split | 20-yard split | 20-yard shuttle | Three-cone drill | Vertical jump | Broad jump | Bench press |
|---|---|---|---|---|---|---|---|---|---|---|---|---|
| 6 ft 4 in (1.93 m) | 303 lb (137 kg) | 33 5/8 in (0.85 m) | 10 1/8 in (0.26 m) | 6 ft 9 1/4 in (2.06 m) | 5.01 s | 1.73 s | 2.80 s | 4.45 s | 7.31 s | 32.5 in (0.83 m) | 9 ft 6 in (2.90 m) | 19 reps |
All values from NFL Combine/Pro Day

Gaines was drafted by the Arizona Cardinals in the fourth round (122nd overall) of the 2023 NFL draft. He was placed on injured reserve on August 29, 2023, ending his season.
