= Malaesala Aumavae–Laulu =

American football player (born 1999)

Profile
- Position: Guard

Personal information
- Born: May 25, 1999 (age 27); Palmer, Alaska, U.S.
- Listed height: 6 ft 5 in (1.96 m)
- Listed weight: 344 lb (156 kg)

Career information
- High school: Liberty (Henderson, Nevada)
- College: Navarro (2017–2018); Oregon (2019–2022)
- NFL draft: 2023: 6th round, 199th overall pick

Career history
- Baltimore Ravens (2023–2024); Seattle Seahawks (2025)*; Washington Commanders (2025–2026)*
- * Offseason or practice squad member only

Career NFL statistics as of 2025
- Games played: 2
- Stats at Pro Football Reference

Malaesala Aumavae–Laulu (/mɑːlaɪˈsɑːlə ˌaʊməˈvaɪ lɑːˈuːlu/ mah-ly-SAH-lə OW-mə-VY lah-OO-loo; born May 25, 1999) is an American professional football guard. He played college football for the Navarro Bulldogs and Oregon Ducks and was drafted by the Baltimore Ravens in the sixth round of the 2023 NFL draft.

== College career ==
Aumavae–Laulu played his first two years of college at Navarro College. As a junior college transfer, he was ranked as a four–star recruit by 247Sports.com. He committed to Oregon on June 24, 2018, over offers from Baylor, Alabama, and Arkansas.

== Professional career ==
Pre-draft measurables
Height	Weight	Arm length	Hand span	Wingspan	40-yard dash	10-yard split	20-yard split	20-yard shuttle	Three-cone drill	Vertical jump	Broad jump	Bench press
6 ft 5 1/2 in (1.97 m)	317 lb (144 kg)	34 1/2 in (0.88 m)	10 1/2 in (0.27 m)	6 ft 10 7/8 in (2.11 m)	5.12 s	1.77 s	2.92 s	4.75 s	7.65 s	28.5 in (0.72 m)	8 ft 10 in (2.69 m)	18 reps
All values from NFL Combine/Pro Day

=== Baltimore Ravens ===
Aumavae–Laulu was selected by the Baltimore Ravens in the sixth round, 199th overall, of the 2023 NFL draft.

On October 15, 2024, Aumavae–Laulu was released by the Ravens and re-signed to the practice squad.

=== Seattle Seahawks ===
On February 3, 2025, Aumavae–Laulu signed a reserve/futures contract with the Seattle Seahawks. He was waived by Seattle on May 20.

=== Washington Commanders ===
On December 31, 2025, Aumavae–Laulu was signed to the Washington Commanders' practice squad. On January 5, 2026, he signed a reserve/futures contract with the Commanders. He was released by Washington on August 11.
