= Zion Tupuola-Fetui =

American football player (born 2000)

Profile
- Position: Defensive lineman

Personal information
- Born: July 3, 2000 (age 26); Pearl City, Hawai'i, U.S.
- Listed height: 6 ft 3 in (1.91 m)
- Listed weight: 251 lb (114 kg)

Career information
- High school: Pearl City (Pearl City, Hawai'i)
- College: Washington (2018–2023)
- NFL draft: 2024: undrafted

Career history
- Saskatchewan Roughriders (2024)

Awards and highlights
- AP Third-team All-American (2020); First team All-Pac 12 (2020); 2019 Las Vegas Bowl; 2024 Sugar Bowl
- Stats at Pro Football Reference

Zion Tupuola-Fetui (born July 3, 2000) is an American professional football defensive lineman. He played college football for the Washington Huskies as a linebacker.

== Early life ==
Tupuola-Fetui attended Pearl City High School in Pearl City, Hawai'i. He played defensive line and tight end in high school. He committed to the University of Washington to play college football. Tupuola-Fetui also played volleyball in high school.

== College career ==
Tupuola-Fetui played two games his first year at Washington in 2018 and took a redshirt. As a redshirt freshman in 2019, he played in 12 games and had nine tackles. As a redshirt sophomore in 2020, he became a starter. Through the first three games of the season, he recorded seven sacks.

== Professional career ==
Pre-draft measurables
Height	Weight	Arm length	Hand span	Wingspan
6 ft 2 3/4 in (1.90 m)	244 lb (111 kg)	33 3/8 in (0.85 m)	10 5/8 in (0.27 m)	6 ft 7 1/4 in (2.01 m)
All values from NFL Combine

Tupuola-Fetui was signed to the practice roster of the Saskatchewan Roughriders of the Canadian Football League on September 15, 2024.

== Coaching career ==
The University of Idaho Vandals announced that Tupuola-Fetui had been hired as a defensive assistant coach on January 16, 2026. Coach Thomas Ford Jr. said his focus will be to assist the defensive line coaches to build a more effective pass rush.
