= Daniel Scott (American football) =

American football player (born 1998)

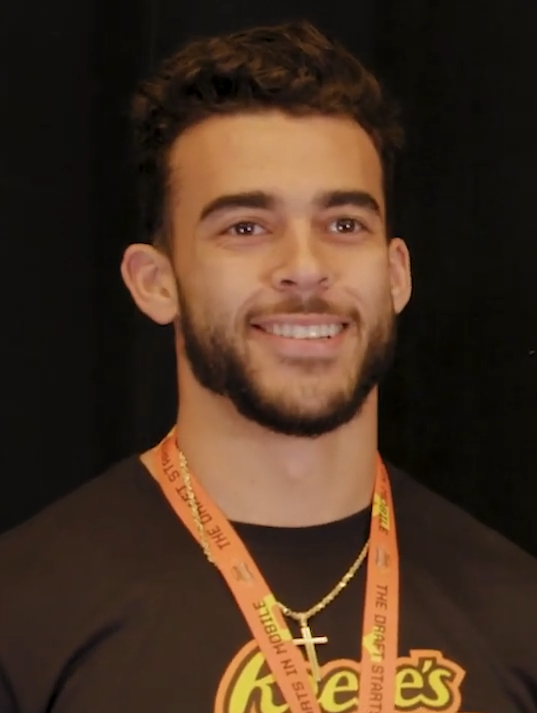
- Scott in 2023

No. 32 – Indianapolis Colts
- Position: Safety
- Roster status: Practice squad

Personal information
- Born: October 26, 1998 (age 28); Pasadena, California, U.S.
- Listed height: 6 ft 1 in (1.85 m)
- Listed weight: 208 lb (94 kg)

Career information
- High school: Saint Francis (La Cañada Flintridge, California)
- College: California (2017–2022)
- NFL draft: 2023: 5th round, 158th overall pick

Career history
- Indianapolis Colts (2023–present)

Awards and highlights
- First-team All-Pac-12 (2021); Third-team All-Pac-12 (2022)

Career NFL statistics as of 2025
- Total tackles: 2
- Stats at Pro Football Reference

Daniel Scott (born October 26, 1998) is an American professional football safety for the Indianapolis Colts of the National Football League (NFL). He played college football for the California Golden Bears.

== Early life ==
Scott grew up in Pasadena, California and attended Saint Francis in La Cañada Flintridge, California. He was named the Pasadena Star-News Area Player of the Year as a senior after recording 70 tackles, four tackles for loss and five interceptions on defense and 41 receptions, 688 receiving yards receiving and 10 touchdown receptions as a wide receiver. Scott committed to play college football at the University of California, Berkeley, over an offer from Fresno State.

== College career ==
Scott redshirted his true freshman season with the California Golden Bears. He played primarily as a reserve and on special teams during his redshirt freshman and sophomore seasons. As a redshirt senior he led the team with 82 tackles and intercepted three passes. Scott used the extra year of eligibility granted to college athletes due to the COVID-19 pandemic and returned to Cal for a sixth season. In his final season he recorded 85 tackles with three interceptions, seven passes defended, and three forced fumbles.

== Professional career ==
Pre-draft measurables
| Height | Weight | Arm length | Hand span | Wingspan | 40-yard dash | 10-yard split | 20-yard split | 20-yard shuttle | Three-cone drill | Vertical jump | Broad jump | Bench press |
|---|---|---|---|---|---|---|---|---|---|---|---|---|
| 6 ft 0 7/8 in (1.85 m) | 208 lb (94 kg) | 30 1/4 in (0.77 m) | 10 in (0.25 m) | 6 ft 2 3/8 in (1.89 m) | 4.45 s | 1.55 s | 2.56 s | 4.17 s | 6.75 s | 39.5 in (1.00 m) | 10 ft 8 in (3.25 m) | 22 reps |
All values from NFL Combine

Scott was selected in the fifth round, 158th overall, of the 2023 NFL draft by the Indianapolis Colts. In OTAs, Scott suffered a torn anterior cruciate ligament (ACL) and was placed on season–ending injured reserve on June 14, 2023. Scott suffered his second straight season-ending injury at OTAs in May 2024, rupturing his Achilles tendon during practice. He was placed on injured reserve for the second straight year on June 6.

On August 30, 2026, Scott was waived by the Colts as a part of final roster cuts; he was re-signed to the team's practice squad the next day.
