= Alex Austin =

American football player (born 2001)

Profile
- Position: Cornerback

Personal information
- Born: May 22, 2001 (age 25); Long Beach, California, U.S.
- Listed height: 6 ft 1 in (1.85 m)
- Listed weight: 191 lb (87 kg)

Career information
- High school: Long Beach Poly
- College: Oregon State (2019–2022)
- NFL draft: 2023: 7th round, 252nd overall pick

Career history
- Buffalo Bills (2023)*; Houston Texans (2023); New England Patriots (2023–2025); Miami Dolphins (2026)*; Dallas Cowboys (2026)*
- * Offseason or practice squad member only

Career NFL statistics as of 2025
- Total tackles: 31
- Pass deflections: 8
- Interceptions: 1
- Stats at Pro Football Reference

Alexander Richard Joseph Austin (born May 22, 2001) is an American professional football cornerback. He played college football for the Oregon State Beavers.

== Early life ==
Austin was born and raised in Long Beach, California, where he attended Long Beach Polytechnic High School.

== College career ==
Austin played at Oregon State for four years and put up 141 tackles, two going for a loss, a sack, four interceptions, 20 pass deflections, three fumble recoveries, and a touchdown.

== Professional career ==
Pre-draft measurables
| Height | Weight | Arm length | Hand span | Wingspan | 40-yard dash | 10-yard split | 20-yard split | 20-yard shuttle | Three-cone drill | Vertical jump | Broad jump |
|---|---|---|---|---|---|---|---|---|---|---|---|
| 6 ft 1 in (1.85 m) | 195 lb (88 kg) | 31 7/8 in (0.81 m) | 8 1/2 in (0.22 m) | 6 ft 4 1/4 in (1.94 m) | 4.55 s | 1.54 s | 2.58 s | 4.25 s | 7.06 s | 33.0 in (0.84 m) | 10 ft 2 in (3.10 m) |
All values from NFL Combine/Pro Day

=== Buffalo Bills ===
Austin was selected by the Buffalo Bills in the seventh round with the 252nd pick overall in the 2023 NFL draft. He was waived on August 29, 2023.

=== Houston Texans ===
On August 30, 2023, Austin was claimed off waivers by the Houston Texans. He was waived on October 14 and re-signed to the practice squad. Austin was released on November 1.

=== New England Patriots ===
On November 2, 2023, Austin signed with the New England Patriots. Austin recorded his first career interception on December 31, in a Week 17 matchup at the Buffalo Bills. He finished the 2023 season with nine tackles and two pass deflections.

On September 28, 2024, Austin was placed on injured reserve after suffering an injury in Week 3 against the New York Jets. He was activated on November 18. He finished the 2024 season with eight tackles and five pass deflections.

On November 25, 2025, Austin was placed on injured reserve. He was activated on January 17, 2026, ahead of the team's Divisional Round matchup against the Houston Texans.

=== Miami Dolphins ===
On March 12, 2026, Austin signed with the Miami Dolphins. He was waived by the Dolphins on August 29.

=== Dallas Cowboys ===
On September 30, 2026, Austin was signed to the Dallas Cowboys' practice squad. On October 13, he was released.
