= 2021 UCLA Bruins football team =

American college football season

2021 UCLA Bruins football

Holiday Bowl, vs. NC State, Canceled
- Conference: Pac-12 Conference
- South Division
- Record: 8–4 (6–3 Pac-12)
- Head coach: Chip Kelly (4th season)
- Offensive coordinator: Justin Frye (3rd season)
- Offensive scheme: Spread option
- Defensive coordinator: Jerry Azzinaro (4th season)
- Base defense: 4–2–5
- Home stadium: Rose Bowl

Uniform
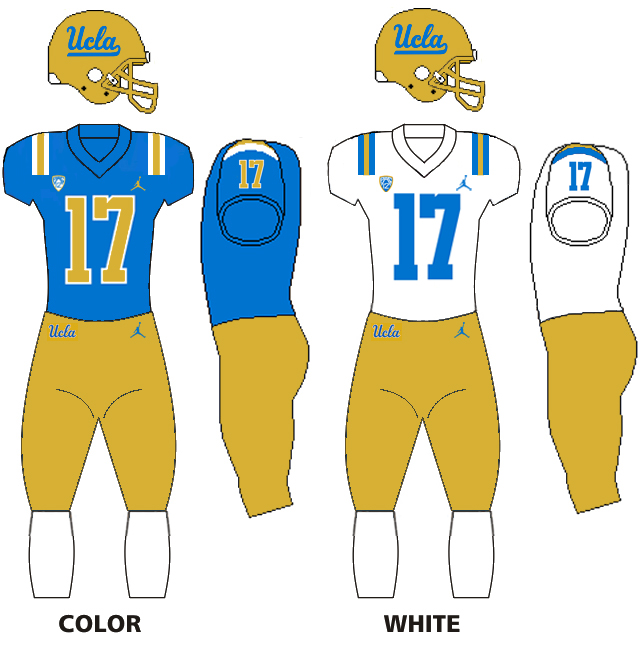

2021 Pac-12 Conference football standings
	Conf.			Overall
Team	W		L	W		L
North Division
No. 22 Oregon xy	7	–	2	10	–	4
Washington State	6	–	3	7	–	6
Oregon State	5	–	4	7	–	6
California	4	–	5	5	–	7
Washington	3	–	6	4	–	8
Stanford	2	–	7	3	–	9
South Division
No. 12 Utah xy$	8	–	1	10	–	4
UCLA	6	–	3	8	–	4
Arizona State†	0	–	3	0	–	5
USC	3	–	6	4	–	8
Colorado	3	–	6	4	–	8
Arizona	1	–	8	1	–	11
Championship: Utah 38, Oregon 10
$ – Conference champion; x – Division champion/co-champions; y – Championship game participant; Rankings from AP Poll

The 2021 UCLA Bruins football team represented the University of California, Los Angeles during the 2021 NCAA Division I FBS football season. The team was led by fourth-year head coach Chip Kelly and competed as members of the South Division in the Pac-12 Conference. Entering this season, Nike became the new apparel sponsor for the team, replacing former supplier Under Armour, and the Bruins' football uniforms bore the Jordan Brand.

In August, UCLA announced that digital tickets would replace printed tickets for entry to all games at the Rose Bowl.

The Bruins finished their regular season with an 8–4 overall record, and accepted a bid to the Holiday Bowl, where they were due to face North Carolina State. However, just hours before game time, the Bruins withdrew from the bowl due to COVID-19 protocols in their program, and the bowl was canceled. Despite their season ending unexpectedly, the Bruins clinched their first winning season and bowl appearance since 2015 and 2017 respectively

Overall, the Bruins outscored their opponents by a combined total of 438 to 321 for the season.

== Offseason ==
=== Incoming transfers ===
The Bruins added 8 players via transfer during the offseason:

- LB Devin Aupiu – Notre Dame
- WR Kam Brown – Texas A&M
- RB Zach Charbonnet – Michigan
- QB Ethan Garbers – Washington
- LB Jordan Genmark Heath – Notre Dame (graduate)
- DB Cameron Johnson – North Texas (graduate)
- LB Ale Kaho – Alabama
- DL Jay Toia – USC

== Preseason ==
=== Arthur Ashe Jr. Sports Scholars ===
- Shea Pitts

=== Preseason award watchlists ===
- Greg Dulcich (Lombardi Award, John Mackey Award)
- Quentin Lake (Lott IMPACT Trophy)
- Kyle Philips (Paul Hornung Award)
- Dorian Thompson-Robinson (Davey O'Brien Award, Maxwell Award, Johnny Unitas Golden Arm Award)

=== Preseason All-Pac-12 team ===
- Kyle Philips (WR), First Team
- Greg Dulcich (TE), First Team
- Sean Rhyan (OL), First Team
- Dorian Thompson-Robinson (QB), Honorable Mention
- Brittain Brown (RB), Honorable Mention
- Sam Marrazzo (OL), Honorable Mention
- Otito Ogbonnia (DL), Honorable Mention
- Caleb Johnson (LB), Honorable Mention
- Qwuantrezz Knight (DB), Honorable Mention
- Quentin Lake (DB), Honorable Mention
- Stephen Blaylock (DB), Honorable Mention
- Nicholas Barr-Mira (PK), Honorable Mention

== Personnel ==
=== Coaching staff ===
Name	Position	Year at UCLA	Alma mater (year)
Chip Kelly	Head coach	4th	New Hampshire (1990)
Justin Frye	Offensive coordinator Offensive Line	4th	Indiana (2006)
Ryan Gunderson	Quarterbacks	1st	Oregon State (2007)
Jerry Azzinaro	Defensive coordinator	4th	American International College (1981)
DeShaun Foster	Running backs	5th	UCLA (2014)
Jerry Neuheisel	Wide receivers	4th	UCLA (2015)
Johnny Nansen	Defensive line	2nd	Washington State (1997)
Don Pellum	Inside linebackers	4th	Oregon (1985)
Brian Norwood	Defensive backs Passing game coordinator Assistant head coach	2nd	Hawaiʻi (1988)
Jason Kaufusi	Outside linebackers	3rd	Utah (2004)
Derek Sage	Tight ends Special teams	4th	Cal State Northridge (2003)

- Ikaika Malloe was hired on December 22 as analyst for UCLA through the Holiday Bowl, replacing Jason Kaufusi, who was hired away by Arizona. He will be a defensive assistant coach next season.
- Chad Kauha'aha'a was hired on December 24 as analyst for UCLA through the Holiday Bowl.

=== Roster ===
2021 UCLA Bruins football team roster
Players
Coaches
Offense

Pos.	#	Name	Class
QB	1	Dorian Thompson-Robinson	Sr
QB	3	Chase Artopoeus	RSo
QB	4	Ethan Garbers	RFr
QB	9	Parker McQuarrie	RFr
QB	11	Chase Griffin	RSo
QB	15	Kajiya Hollawayne	Fr
RB	19	Kazmeir Allen	RJr
RB	22	Keegan Jones	RSo
RB	24	Zach Charbonnet	Jr
RB	26	Brian Kowall	RFr
RB	28	Brittain Brown	RSr
RB	31	Deshun Murrell	Fr
RB	32	Christian Grubb	RSo
RB	36	Ethan Fernea	RSr
WR	0	Kam Brown	RSo
WR	2	Kyle Philips	RJr
WR	7	Colson Yankoff	RJr
WR	12	Matt Sykes	So
WR	14	Josiah Norwood	RJr
WR	17	Logan Loya	So
WR	18	Keontez Lewis	Fr
WR	19	Kazmeir Allen	RJr
WR	20	DJ Justice	Fr
WR	21	Bradley Schlom	RFr
WR	23	Chase Cota	Sr
WR	25	Ezavier Staples	Fr
WR	26	Ashton Authement	RSo
WR	29	Delon Hurt	Sr
WR	35	Devanti Dillard	RFr
TE	37	Lucas Egurbide	RFr
TE	81	Hudson Habermehl	RSo
TE	82	Sam Summa	Fr
TE	83	David Priebe	RJr
TE	85	Greg Dulcich	RJr
TE	86	Michael Ezeike	Sr
TE	87	Grant Norberg	RFr
TE	88	Mike Martinez	Jr
TE	89	Michael Churich	RSo
OL	52	Benjamin Roy Jr.	Fr
OL	53	Luke Young	RSo
OL	54	Josh Carlin	RSo
OL	55	Thomas Cole	Fr
OL	56	Atonio Mafi	Sr
OL	57	Jon Gaines II	RJr
OL	59	Siale Taupaki	RSo
OL	62	Duke Clemens	Jr
OL	63	Brad Whitworth	RSo
OL	64	Sam Marrazzo	Sr
OL	65	Paul Grattan	RSr
OL	67	Taka Mahe	Fr
OL	68	Noah Pulealii	Fr
OL	69	Justin Williams	RFr
OL	70	Alec Anderson	RJr
OL	71	Baraka Beckett	RJr
OL	72	Garrett DiGiorgio	Fr
OL	74	Sean Rhyan	Jr
OL	75	Bruno Fina	RFr
OL	76	Patrick Selna	RFr
OL	77	Beau Taylor	RSo
OL	78	Lucas Gramlick	RJr

Defense }}

Pos.	#	Name	Class
DL	44	Martin Andrus Jr.	Sr
DL	46	Hayden Harris	RSo
DL	50	Tyler Manoa	Sr
DL	54	John Ward	RSo
DL	55	Tyler Kiehne	Fr
DL	58	Datona Jackson	RSr
DL	61	Carson Drake	RSo
DL	91	Otito Ogbonnia	Sr
DL	92	Quintin Somerville	Fr
DL	93	Jay Toia	Fr
DL	94	Dovid Magna	RSo
DL	95	Sitiveni Havili-Kaufusi	RSo
DL	97	Odua Isibor	Sr
DL	98	Tiaoalii Savea	Fr
LB	0	Damian Sellers	So
LB	9	Choe Bryant-Strother	So
LB	10	Ale Kaho	RJr
LB	15	Jordan Genmark Heath	RSr
LB	20	Kain Medrano	RSo
LB	21	JonJon Vaughns	So
LB	25	Myles Jackson	RFr
LB	29	Adam Cohen	RSo
LB	33	Bo Calvert	Sr
LB	35	Carl Jones Jr.	Jr
LB	40	Caleb Johnson	Sr
LB	41	Devin Aupiu	Fr
LB	43	James Dinneen	RSo
LB	45	Mitchell Agude	Sr
LB	47	Erich Osteen	RSo
LB	47	Shea Pitts	RSr
LB	48	Joquarri Price	RFr
LB	49	Carson Schwesinger	Fr
LB	52	Jeremiah Trojan	RFr
LB	53	Christian Burkhalter	Fr
LB	56	Kobey Fitzgerald	Sr
LB	90	AJ Campbell	Fr
LB	96	Hayden Nelson	Fr
DB	1	Jay Shaw	Sr
DB	3	Cameron Johnson	RSr
DB	4	Stephan Blaylock	Sr
DB	6	John Humphrey	So
DB	7	Mo Osling III	Sr
DB	10	Joshua Swift	RFr
DB	11	Josh Moore	Fr
DB	12	Martell Irby	RJr
DB	14	DJ Warnell	So
DB	15	Jake Newman	RFr
DB	17	Parker Hogan	RFr
DB	18	Deavyn Woullard	RSo
DB	19	Alex Johnson	RJr
DB	22	Obi Eboh	RSr
DB	23	Shamar Martin	RSo
DB	24	Qwuantrezz Knight	RSr
DB	26	Devin Kirkwood	Fr
DB	27	Patrick Jolly Jr.	RJr
DB	28	Kenny Churchwell III	RJr
DB	28	Evan Thomas	RFr
DB	30	Elisha Guidry	RJr
DB	31	Isaiah Newcombe	Fr
DB	32	William Nimmo Jr.	RSo
DB	37	Quentin Lake	Sr
DB	39	Kaleb Tuliau	RSo
DB	41	Jelani Warren	RSo

Special teams

Pos.	#	Name	Class
P	49	Collin Flintoft	RJr
P	99	Luke Akers	So
K	2	Nicholas Barr-Mira	RSo
K	93	RJ Lopez	So
K	99	Luke Akers	So
LS	51	Jack Landherr IV	Jr
LS	60	Beau Gardner	RFr

== Schedule ==
Date	Time	Opponent	Rank	Site	TV	Result	Attendance
August 28	12:30 p.m.	Hawaii*		Rose Bowl; Pasadena, CA	ESPN	W 44–10	32,982
September 4	5:30 p.m.	No. 16 LSU*		Rose Bowl; Pasadena, CA	FOX	W 38–27	68,123
September 18	7:45 p.m.	Fresno State*	No. 13	Rose Bowl; Pasadena, CA	P12N	L 37–40	50,698
September 25	3:00 p.m.	at Stanford	No. 24	Stanford Stadium; Stanford, CA (rivalry)	P12N	W 35–24	47,236
October 2	7:30 p.m.	Arizona State	No. 20	Rose Bowl; Pasadena, CA	FS1	L 23–42	40,522
October 9	7:30 p.m.	at Arizona		Arizona Stadium; Tucson, AZ	ESPN	W 34–16	43,258
October 16	5:30 p.m.	at Washington		Husky Stadium; Seattle, WA	FOX	W 24–17	62,266
October 23	12:30 p.m.	No. 10 Oregon^{†}		Rose Bowl; Pasadena, CA (College GameDay)	ABC	L 31–34	55,675
October 30	7:00 p.m.	at Utah		Rice–Eccles Stadium; Salt Lake City, UT	ESPN	L 24–44	51,922
November 13	6:00 p.m.	Colorado		Rose Bowl; Pasadena, CA (Veteran and Armed Forces Appreciation)	P12N	W 44–20	36,573
November 20	1:00 p.m.	at USC		Los Angeles Memorial Coliseum; Los Angeles, CA (Victory Bell)	FOX	W 62–33	68,152
November 27	7:30 p.m.	California		Rose Bowl; Pasadena, CA (rivalry)	FS1	W 42–14	36,156
December 28	5:00 p.m.	vs. No. 18 NC State*		Petco Park; San Diego, CA (Holiday Bowl)	FOX	Canceled	
*Non-conference game; ^{†}Homecoming; Rankings from AP Poll and CFP Rankings after November 2 released prior to game; All times are in Pacific time

== Game summaries ==
=== vs Hawaii ===
Hawaii Rainbow Warriors vs UCLA Bruins – Game summary

Quarter	1	2	3	4	Total
Rainbow Warriors	3	0	7	0	10
Bruins	24	7	13	0	44

at Rose Bowl, Pasadena, CA

- Date: August 28, 2021
- Game time: 12:30 p.m. PDT
- Game weather: 93 °F (34 °C) Clear, Sunny
- Game attendance: 32,982
- Referee: Scott Campbell
- TV announcers (ESPN): Beth Mowins (play-by-play), Kirk Morrison (analyst), and Dawn Davenport (sideline)
- Game Book

Game information

First quarter

- UCLA – Nicholas Barr-Mira 27-yard field goal, 12:00. UCLA 3–0. Drive: 4 plays, 6 yards, 0:58.
- UCLA – Zach Charbonnet 21-yard run (Nicholas Barr-Mira kick), 7:30. UCLA 10–0. Drive: 9 plays, 87 yards, 2:45.
- UCLA – Brittain Brown 1-yard run (Nicholas Barr-Mira kick), 6:06. UCLA 17–0. Drive: 4 plays, 9 yards, 1:08.
- HAW – Matthew Shipley 48-yard field goal, 1:47. UCLA 17–3. Drive: 10 plays, 44 yards, 4:19.
- UCLA – Zach Charbonnet 47-yard run (Nicholas Barr-Mira kick), 0:46. UCLA 24–3. Drive: 4 plays, 75 yards, 1:01.

Second quarter

- UCLA – Zach Charbonnet 21-yard run (Nicholas Barr-Mira kick), 11:31. UCLA 31–3. Drive: 7 plays, 61 yards, 2:35.

Third quarter

- UCLA – Kazmeir Allen 44-yard pass from Dorian Thompson-Robinson (kick failed), 13:02. UCLA 37–3. Drive: 5 plays, 75 yards, 1:58.
- UCLA – David Priebe 0-yard fumble recovery (Nicholas Barr-Mira kick), 11:20. UCLA 44–3.
- HAW – Caleb Phillips 1-yard pass from Chevan Cordeiro (Matthew Shipley kick), 3:17. UCLA 44–10. Drive: 9 plays, 90 yards, 4:24.

Fourth quarter

- No scoring

Top passers

- HAW – Chevan Cordeiro – 25/47, 220 yards, TD, 2 INT
- UCLA – Dorian Thompson-Robinson – 10/20, 130 yards, TD

Top rushers

- HAW – Dae Dae Hunter – 7 rushes, 20 yards
- UCLA – Zach Charbonnet – 6 rushes, 106 yards, 2 TD

Top receivers

- HAW – Calvin Turner – 5 receptions, 50 yards
- UCLA – Kazmeir Allen – 2 receptions, 47 yards, TD

In his fourth season at UCLA, head coach Chip Kelly earned his first nonconference victory and first season-opening win with the Bruins after defeating Hawaii, 44–10. Prior to this, he had been 0–6 in nonconference games, including 0–4 against Group of Five schools, at UCLA. Running back Zach Charbonnet, a fresh transfer from Michigan, ran for 106 yards and three touchdowns in his UCLA debut. Charbonnet carried the ball six times and scored on runs of 21, 47 and again on 21 yards, helping the Bruins establish a 31–3 lead early in the second quarter. With the Bruins ahead by a wide margin, he did not carry the ball again in the game. Brittain Brown ran for 78 yards on 13 attempts, combining with Charbonnet to run for 184 yards and four touchdowns.

The Bruins built a 44–3 lead early in the second half before sending in the reserves. In all, UCLA's defense held Hawaii to 269 total yards and without a touchdown until late in the third quarter. Bruins linebacker Ale Kaho blocked a punt and teammate David Priebe recovered the ball in the endzone for a touchdown, which also ended the Rainbow Warriors’ streak of 154 game without a blocked punt, which had been the longest in the country. Dorian Thompson-Robinson was 10-of-20 passing for 130 yards and did not commit a turnover for the Bruins.

The game was played before an announced crowd of 32,982, the second-smallest ever at a UCLA home game at the Rose Bowl, ahead of only the 32,513 for an Oregon State game in November 1992.

=== vs No. 16 LSU ===
No. 16 LSU Tigers vs UCLA Bruins – Game summary

Quarter	1	2	3	4	Total
No. 16 Tigers	0	10	10	7	27
Bruins	0	14	10	14	38

at Rose Bowl, Pasadena, CA

- Date: September 4, 2021
- Game time: 5:30 P.M PDT
- Game weather: 93 °F (34 °C) Clear
- Game attendance: 68,123
- Referee: David Smith
- TV announcers (FOX): Joe Davis (play-by-play), Brock Huard (analyst), and Bruce Feldman (sideline)
- Game Book

Game information

First quarter

- No scoring.

Second quarter

- LSU – Kayshon Boutte 3-yard pass from Max Johnson (Cade York kick), 12:34. LSU 7–0. Drive: 8 plays, 63 yards, 2:36.
- UCLA – Greg Dulcich 75-yard pass from Dorian Thompson-Robinson (Nicholas Barr-Mira kick), 12:20. Tie 7–7. Drive: 1 play, 75 yards, 0:14.
- UCLA – Zach Charbonnet 12-yard run (Nicholas Barr-Mira kick), 09:49. UCLA 14–7. Drive: 6 plays, 71 yards, 1:31.
- LSU – Cade York 26-yard field goal, 03:53. UCLA 14–10. Drive: 5 plays, 26 yards, 0:51.

Third quarter

- UCLA – Chase Cota 14-yard pass from Dorian Thompson-Robinson (Nicholas Barr-Mira kick), 10:52. UCLA 21–10. Drive: 3 plays, 17 yards, 0:43.
- LSU – Kayshon Boutte 44-yard pass from Max Johnson (Cade York kick), 08:56. UCLA 21–17. Drive: 4 plays, 75 yards, 1:56.
- UCLA – Nicholas Barr-Mira 43-yard field goal, 06:38. UCLA 24–17. Drive: 6 plays, 50 yards, 2:18.
- LSU – Cade York 33-yard field goal, 01:07. UCLA 24–20. Drive: 12 plays, 60 yards, 5:31.

Fourth quarter

- UCLA – Brittain Brown 1-yard rush (Nicholas Barr-Mira kick), 12:28. UCLA 31–20. Drive: 8 plays, 73 yards, 3:31.
- UCLA – Kyle Philips 45-yard pass from Dorian Thompson-Robinson (Nicholas Barr-Mira kick), 06:31. UCLA 38–20. Drive: 8 plays, 81 yards, 4:34.
- LSU – Kayshon Boutte 45-yard pass from Max Johnson (Cade York kick), 04:08. UCLA 38–27. Drive: 7 plays, 73 yards, 2:23.

Top passers

- LSU – Max Johnson – 26/36, 330 yards, 3 TD, INT
- UCLA – Dorian Thompson-Robinson – 9/16, 260 yards, 3 TD, INT

Top rushers

- LSU – Tyrion Davis-Price – 13 rushes, 30 yards
- UCLA – Zach Charbonnet – 11 rushes, 117 yards, TD

Top receivers

- LSU – Kayshon Boutte – 9 receptions, 148 yards, 3 TD
- UCLA – Greg Dulcich – 3 receptions, 117 yards, TD

In a prime-time nationally televised game, the Bruins defeated the No. 16 LSU Tigers, 38–27. It was the first time since 2017 that UCLA began the season 2–0. Thompson-Robinson completed 9 of 16 passes for 260 yards, three touchdowns and an interception. Charbonnet had his second consecutive 100-yard game, finishing with 11 rushes for 117 yards and a touchdown. Brown also ran for 96 yards on 17 attempts and a fourth-quarter score.

UCLA evened the score 7–7 in the first quarter after Thompson-Robinson threw a 75-yard touchdown pass to tight end Greg Dulcich, who had three catches for 117 yards in the game. The Bruins took the lead for good on a 12-yard touchdown run by Charbonnet with 9:49 left in the second quarter. In the third quarter, UCLA's Caleb Johnson intercepted LSU's Max Johnson and returned it 34 yards to the Tigers' 17. The Bruins scored in three plays on a Thompson-Robinson 12-yard pass to Chase Cota for a 21–10 lead. Midway into the fourth quarter, Thompson-Robinson threw a 45-yard touchdown pass to Kyle Philips to make it 38–20, virtually sealing the game.

The Bruins held the Tigers to 48 yards rushing on 1.9 yards per carry. Johnson was 26 of 46 passing for 330 yards with three touchdowns and one interception while being pressured into mistakes by the UCLA defense. The win over LSU was the first time in 13 years that a Pac-12 team beat a ranked opponent from the Southeastern Conference since the Bruins defeated Tennessee in 2008. The Rose Bowl attendance of 68,123 more than doubled the crowd from the previous week in the season opener. The win pushed UCLA into the national rankings at No. 16 in both the Associated Press and the Coaches Poll. It was the first time the Bruins were ranked since 2017.

=== vs Fresno State ===
Fresno State Bulldogs vs No. 13 UCLA Bruins – Game summary

Quarter	1	2	3	4	Total
Bulldogs	6	17	3	14	40
No. 13 Bruins	7	3	7	20	37

at Rose Bowl, Pasadena, CA

- Date: September 18, 2021
- Game time: 7:45 P.M PDT
- Game weather: 68 °F (20 °C) Clear
- Game attendance: 50,698
- Referee: Francisco Villar
- TV announcers (P12N): Ted Robinson (play-by-play), Yogi Roth (analyst)
- Game Book

Game information

First quarter

- FRES – Ronnie Rivers 1-yard run (2pt pass fail), 5:54. Fresno State 6–0. Drive: 10 plays, 55 yards, 5:21.
- UCLA – Zach Charbonnet 6-yard run (Nicholas Barr-Mira kick), 3:59. UCLA 7–6. Drive: 5 plays, 73 yards, 1:49.

Second quarter

- FRES – Jalen Cropper 1-yard run (Abraham Montano kick), 11:49. Fresno State 13–7. Drive: 14 plays, 79 yards, 7:06.
- UCLA – Nicholas Barr-Mira 39-yard field goal, 9:43. Fresno State 13–10. Drive: 4 plays, 6 yards, 1:56.
- FRES – Ronnie Rivers 36-yard run (Abraham Montano kick), 6:37. Fresno State 20–10. Drive: 7 plays, 75 yards, 3:06.
- FRES – Abraham Montano 21-yard field goal, 0:08. Fresno State 23–10. Drive: 6 plays, 16 yards, 0:50.

Third quarter

- UCLA – Kam Brown 39-yard pass from Dorian Thompson-Robinson (Nicholas Barr-Mira kick), 12:29. Fresno State 23–17. Drive: 6 plays, 75 yards, 2:24.
- FRES – Abraham Montano 39-yard field goal, 7:33. Fresno State 26–17. Drive: 5 plays, 30 yards, 0:55.

Fourth quarter

- UCLA – Kyle Philips 42-yard pass from Dorian Thompson-Robinson (Nicholas Barr-Mira kick), 8:10. Fresno State 26–24. Drive: 3 plays, 57 yards, 1:13.
- UCLA – Zach Charbonnet 3-yard run (2pt rush fail), 7:27. UCLA 30–26. Drive: 3 plays, 18 yards, 0:30.
- FRES – Erik Brooks 19-yard pass from Jake Haener (Abraham Montano kick), 2:55. Fresno State 33–30. Drive: 10 plays, 75 yards, 4:32.
- UCLA – Kyle Phillips 15-yard pass from Dorian Thompson-Robinson (Nicholas Barr-Mira kick), 0:54. UCLA 37–33. Drive: 9 plays, 75 yards, 2:01.
- FRES – Jalen Cropper 13-yard pass from Jake Haener (Abraham Montano kick), 0:14. Fresno State 40–37. Drive: 6 plays, 75 yards, 0:40.

Top passers

- FRES – Jake Haener – 39/53, 455 yards, 2 TD, INT
- UCLA – Dorian Thompson-Robinson – 14/24, 278 yards, 3 TD

Top rushers

- FRES – Ronnie Rivers – 21 rushes, 136 yards, 2 TD
- UCLA – Dorian Thompson-Robinson – 13 rushes, 67 yards

Top receivers

- FRES – Jalen Cropper – 14 receptions, 141 yards, TD
- UCLA – Kyle Philips – 7 receptions, 113 yards, 2 TD

Fresno State quarterback Jake Haener passed for 455 yards and threw the winning touchdown with 14 seconds left in the game to upset the Bruins 40–37. Limiping from an injured right hip, Haener led a six-play, 75-yard drive, culminating in a winning throw to Jalen Cropper for their fourth straight win over UCLA. The Bruins trailed 23–10 at halftime, but rallied in a game that had four lead changes in the final 7:27. UCLA went up 37–33 with 54 seconds left after Thompson-Robinson threw a 15-yard touchdown to Philips.

Fresno State focused on stopping UCLA's running game, holding Bruins' running backs Charbonnet and Brown to a 42 combined yards rushing on 2.8 yards per carry. UCLA's offense was limited to 16 plays in the first half, while Haener completed 21 passes by halftime. Down 26–17 in the fourth quarter, the Bruins came back after forcing two fumbles in a 1 1/2-minute span in the middle of the quarter, converting both into touchdowns for a 30–26 lead. The Bulldogs regained the lead after Haener's 19-yard touchdown pass to Erik Brooks put them ahead 33–30 with 2:55 remaining. After the play, Haener was on the ground, grimacing in pain, after suffering numerous hits in the contest.

Thompson-Robinson threw for 278 yards and three touchdowns, and he also led UCLA with 67 yards rushing on 13 carries. The Bulldogs' attention to the run opened up one-on-one coverage in their pass defense, contributing to Philips' seven receptions for 113 yards and two touchdowns. Fellow receiver Kam Brown finished with five catches for 111 yards and a touchdown. Charbonnet ran for two touchdowns. On defense, the Bruins surrendered 569 total yards and 32 first downs. Haener finished 38-of-53 passing and threw two touchdowns. Cropper had 14 catches for 141 yards and teammate Josh Kelly added eight receptions for 120 yards. Ronnie Rivers ran for 136 yards and two touchdowns.

=== At Stanford ===
No. 24 UCLA Bruins at Stanford Cardinal – Game summary

Quarter	1	2	3	4	Total
No. 24 Bruins	14	7	0	14	35
Cardinal	0	7	7	10	24

at Stanford Stadium, Stanford, CA

- Date: September 25, 2021
- Game time: 3:00 P.M PDT
- Game weather: 73 °F (23 °C) Sunny
- Game attendance: 47,236
- Referee: Mark Duddy
- TV announcers (P12N): Ted Robinson (play-by-play), Yogi Roth (analyst)
- Game Book

Game information

First quarter

- UCLA – Dorian Thompson-Robinson 1-yard rush (Nicholas Barr-Mira kick), 12:12. UCLA 7–0. Drive: 4 plays, 13 yards, 2:16.
- UCLA – Zach Charbonnet 5-yard rush (Nicholas Barr-Mira kick), 0:15. UCLA 14–0. Drive: 17 plays, 88 yards, 8:00.

Second quarter

- STAN – Brycen Tremayne 19-yard pass from Tanner McKee (Joshua Karty kick), 4:31. UCLA 14–7. Drive: 7 plays, 70 yards, 4:05.
- UCLA – Dorian Thompson-Robinson 2-yard rush (Nicholas Barr-Mira kick), 0:23. UCLA 21–7. Drive: 7 plays, 55 yards, 1:17.

Third quarter

- STAN – Elijah Higgins 56-yard pass from Tanner McKee (Joshua Karty kick), 5:30. UCLA 21–14. Drive: 1 play, 56 yards, 0:10.

Fourth quarter

- STAN – Bryce Farrell 52-yard pass from Tanner McKee (Joshua Karty kick), 13:06. Tied 21–21. Drive: 5 plays, 80 yards, 2:16.
- UCLA – Kyle Philips 75-yard pass from Dorian Thompson-Robinson (Nicholas Barr-Mira kick), 12:56. UCLA 28–21. Drive: 1 play, 75 yards, 0:10.
- STAN – Joshua Karty 45-yard field goal, 9:10. UCLA 28–24. Drive: 7 plays, 45 yards, 3:06.
- UCLA – Kyle Philips 5-yard pass from Dorian Thompson-Robinson (Nicholas Barr-Mira kick), 2:30. UCLA 35–24. Drive: 13 plays, 75 yards, 6:40.

Top passers

- UCLA – Dorian Thompson-Robinson – 18/29, 251 yards, 2 TD
- STAN – Tanner McKee – 19/32, 293 yards, 3 TD

Top rushers

- UCLA – Zach Charbonnet – 23 rushes, 118 yards, TD
- STAN – Tanner McKee – 8 rushes, 42 yards

Top receivers

- UCLA – Kyle Philips – 5 receptions, 120 yards, 2 TD
- STAN – Elijah Higgins – 5 receptions, 103 yards, TD

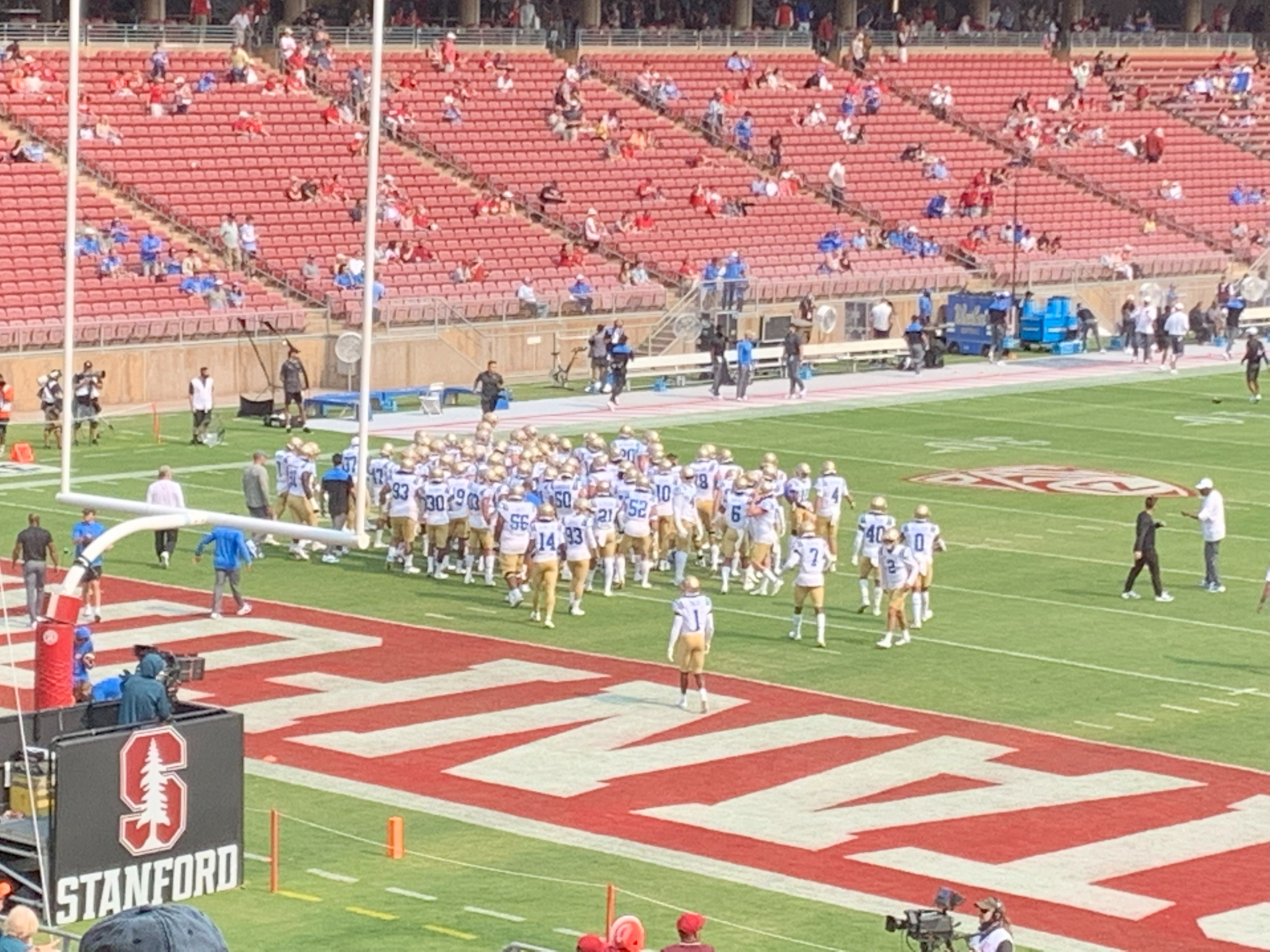
The Bruins huddling prior to the Stanford game

Thompson-Robinson threw two touchdowns in the fourth quarter to lead UCLA to a 35–24 road win over Stanford. Ten seconds after the Cardinal tied the game at 21, he threw a tie-breaking 75-yard score to Philips. Thompson-Robinson later left the game due to a shoulder injury, but returned on the next play to throw a five-yard touchdown to Philips, sealing the outcome with 2:35 remaining in the game. Thompson-Robinson also ran for two touchdowns in the contest.

Stanford won the coin toss and elected to receive the opening kickoff. However, they began the game with five consecutive three-and-out drives, finally producing a first down on their sixth drive in the middle of the second quarter. Philips had a 59-yard punt return in the first quarter to set up a one-yard touchdown run by Thompson-Robinson. The Bruins went up 14–0 on a short running score by Charbonnet. Cardinal quarterback Tanner McKee began finding his receivers, throwing a 19-yard touchdown to Elijah Higgins in the second quarter. Thompson-Robinson put UCLA up by 14 again with another touchdown run late in the quarter. McKee hooked up with Higgins on a 56-yard touchdown pass in the third quarter, and Stanford tied the game early in the fourth quarter after McKee connected with Bryce Farrell on 52-yard touchdown.

Thompson-Robinson completed 18 of his 29 passes for 251 yards. Charbonnet had 118 yards rushing, and Brittain Brown added 66. UCLA's defense held Stanford to 67 yards rushing on 22 carries for an average of three yards per carry. The win was the Bruins' second in the last 14 meetings against the Cardinal.

=== vs Arizona State ===
Arizona State Sun Devils vs No. 20 UCLA Bruins – Game summary

Quarter	1	2	3	4	Total
Sun Devils	3	21	8	10	42
No. 20 Bruins	3	20	0	0	23

at Rose Bowl, Pasadena, CA

- Date: October 2, 2021
- Game time: 7:30 p.m. PDT
- Game weather: 80 °F (27 °C) Clear
- Game attendance: 40,522
- Referee: Michael Mothershed
- TV announcers (FS1): Chris Myers (play-by-play), Mark Helfrich (analyst)
- Game Book

Game information

First quarter

- UCLA – Nicholas Barr-Mira 48-yard field goal, 10:40. UCLA 3–0. Drive: 10 plays, 45 yards, 4:20.
- ASU – Cristian Zendejas 25-yard field goal, 4:11. Tied 3–3. Drive: 5 plays, 20 yards, 2:20.

Second quarter

- UCLA – Kyle Philips 3-yard pass from Dorian Thompson-Robinson (Nicholas Barr-Mira kick), 14:57. UCLA 10–3. Drive: 12 plays, 75 yards, 4:14.
- ASU – DeaMonte Trayanum 6-yard run (Cristian Zendejas kick), 11:59. Tied 10–10. Drive: 7 plays, 75 yards, 2:58.
- UCLA – Brittain Brown 1-yard run (Nicholas Barr-Mira kick), 10:03. UCLA 17–10. Drive: 6 plays, 73 yards, 1:48.
- ASU – Ricky Pearsall 65-yard pass from Jayden Daniels (Cristian Zendejas kick), 8:26. Tied 17–17. Drive: 4 plays, 83 yards, 1:32.
- UCLA – Nicholas Barr-Mira 21-yard field goal, 3:51. UCLA 20–17. Drive: 12 plays, 72 yards, 4:35.
- ASU – Ricky Pearsall 54-yard pass from Jayden Daniels (Cristian Zendejas kick), 2:44. ASU 24–20. Drive: 3 plays, 75 yards, 1:07.
- UCLA – Nicholas Barr-Mira 26-yard field goal, 0:00. ASU 24–23. Drive: 1 play, 0 yards, 0:00.

Third quarter

- ASU – Rachaad White 49-yard run (DeaMonte Trayanum run), 13:32. ASU 32–23. Drive: 4 plays, 75 yards, 1:28.

Fourth quarter

- ASU – Rachaad White 1-yard run (Cristian Zendejas kick), 6:43. ASU 39–23. Drive: 11 plays, 96 yards, 6:52.
- ASU – Cristian Zendejas 32-yard field goal, 2:41. ASU 42–23. Drive: 6 plays, 11 yards, 1:54.

Top passers

- ASU – Jayden Daniels – 13/18, 286 yards, 2 TD
- UCLA – Dorian Thompson-Robinson – 21/32, 235 yards, TD

Top rushers

- ASU – Rachaad White – 9 rushes, 69 yards, 2 TD
- UCLA – Dorian Thompson-Robinson – 18 rushes, 93 yards

Top receivers

- ASU – Ricky Pearsall – 4 receptions, 132 yards, 2 TD
- UCLA – Greg Dulcich – 9 receptions, 136 yards

UCLA lost 42–23 to Arizona State, as both teams vied for a 2–0 conference record and sole possession of first place in the Pac-12 South. The Bruins were down 32–23 early in the fourth quarter when Thompson-Robinson was stopped for a one-yard loss on fourth and one from the Sun Devils' two-yard line. Arizona State followed with an 11-play, 96-yard touchdown drive that took 6:52. UCLA committed 64 of their 89 penalty yards in the second half, and they were shutout in the second half for the first time since 2019 against Utah.

In the first quarter, the teams limited each other to a field goal before a high-scoring second quarter. After Sun Devils quarterback Jayden Daniels threw a 65-yard touchdown pass to Ricky Pearsall, the two reconnected on their following for a 54-yard score, giving Arizona State their first lead of the game with 2:44 remaining in the half. The Sun Devils fumbled a punt return before the half ended, which the Bruins recovered, allowing Nicholas Barr-Mira to kick a field goal as time expired. Early in the third quarter, Arizona State extended its lead to 32–23 on a 49-yard touchdown run by Rachaad White and a two-point conversion. UCLA was scoreless on its last five possessions of the game after scoring on five of seven to start the game.

Thompson-Robinson passed for 235 yards and ran for 93 in the game. Dulcich had a career-high nine catches for 136 yards, and Charbonnet carried 21 times for 89 yards. After the Sun Devils relied on its running game in their first four contests, Daniels threw for a season-high 286 yards. He had four passes that went for 47 yards or more against a Bruins defense that was last among Power Five schools with nine passes allowed of forty yards or more. UCLA played most of the game without injured safeties Quentin Lake and Kenny Churchwell III, which forced walk-on Alex Johnson into action. Bruins coach Kelly credited the Sun Devils for taking advantage of their depth issues at safety. Arizona State gained 458 total yards on offense, averaging nine yards per play, despite running only 51 plays to UCLA's 83 and the Bruins controlling the time of possession, 34:42 to 25:18.

=== At Arizona ===
UCLA Bruins at Arizona Wildcats – Game summary

Quarter	1	2	3	4	Total
Bruins	7	7	10	10	34
Wildcats	3	10	3	0	16

at Arizona Stadium, Tucson, AZ

- Date: October 9, 2021
- Game time: 7:30 p.m. PDT
- Game weather: 75 °F (24 °C) Clear
- Game attendance: 43,258
- Referee: Chris Coyte
- TV announcers (ESPN): Dave Flemming (play by play), Rod Gilmore (analyst), Stormy Buonantony (sideline)
- Game Book

Game information

First quarter

- ARIZ – Tyler Loop 28-yard field goal, 9:03. ARIZ 3–0. Drive: 14 plays, 65 yards, 5:57.
- UCLA – Greg Dulcich 3-yard pass from Dorian Thompson-Robinson (Nicholas Barr-Mira kick), 3:48. UCLA 7–3. Drive: 13 plays, 75 yards, 5:15.

Second quarter

- ARIZ – Lucas Havrisik 46-yard field goal, 14:18. UCLA 7–6. Drive: 12 plays, 47 yards, 4:30.
- UCLA – Dorian Thompson-Robinson 2-yard run (Nicholas Barr-Mira kick), 3:01. UCLA 14–6. Drive: 9 plays, 72 yards, 4:00.
- ARIZ – Michael Wiley 10-yard pass from Jamarye Joiner (Tyler Loop kick), 0:30. UCLA 14–13. Drive: 9 plays, 75 yards, 2:31.

Third quarter

- UCLA – Nicholas Barr-Mira 23-yard field goal, 13:17. UCLA 17–13. Drive: 5 plays, 15 yards, 1:33.
- ARIZ – Lucas Havrisik 46-yard field goal, 8:18. UCLA 17–16. Drive: 11 plays, 48 yards, 4:59.
- UCLA – Dorian Thompson-Robinson 4-yard run (Nicholas Barr-Mira kick), 4:06. UCLA 24–16. Drive: 9 plays, 75 yards, 4:12.

Fourth quarter

- UCLA – Brittain Brown 48-yard run (Nicholas Barr-Mira kick), 7:48. UCLA 31–16. Drive: 6 plays, 69 yards, 3:17.
- UCLA – Nicholas Barr-Mira 43-yard field goal, 1:43. UCLA 34–16. Drive: 12 plays, 35 yards, 5:24.

Top passers

- UCLA – Dorian Thompson-Robinson – 8/19, 82 yards, TD, INT
- ARIZ – Jordan McCloud – 21/30, 182 yards

Top rushers

- UCLA – Brittain Brown – 12 rushes, 146 yards, TD
- ARIZ – Drake Anderson – 16 rushes, 58 yards

Top receivers

- UCLA – Greg Dulcich – 3 receptions, 36 yards, TD
- ARIZ – Stanley Berryhill – 7 receptions, 59 yards

Brown ran for a 48-yard touchdown in the fourth quarter to seal a victory over Arizona in a 34–16 win by UCLA. Charbonnet added 117 yards rushing, as the Bruins ran for 329 yard in the game on seven yards per carry. Thompson-Robinson accounted for three touchdowns, but his throws were inconsistent, totalling just 82 yards passing. The Wildcats' extended their losing streak to a school-record 17.

UCLA ran for 165 yards in the first half, and Thompson-Robinson had a three-yard scoring pass to Dulcich in the first quarter and ran for a two-yard touchdown in the second. The Bruins led 14–13 at halftime, but their quarterback had completed just one of his eight passes for three yards. Arizona settled for two field goals after drives that reached the UCLA 9- and 20-yard lines stalled. Up 24–16 late in the third quarter, the Bruins seemed to be taking control with the ball deep in Wildcats' territory. Brown ran for 11 yards on third and six but fumbled on the Arizona 18. UCLA's defense forced a turnover, and Brown atoned for his fumble with a score on his next run.

Brown and Charbonnet became the first pair of Bruins to rush for a 100 yards in the same game since Paul Perkins and Brett Hundley in 2014 against Colorado. UCLA had their most rushing yards since totalling 345 in 2013 in their season opener against Nevada. Thompson-Robinson completed eight of 19 passes in the game for one touchdown and one interception, while running for 28 yards and two touchdowns. After saying earlier in the week that he was "not really even close to 100%", he said his struggles were not related to injury, and Kelly credited the Wildcats' defense. Offensively, Arizona scored just one touchdown in six possessions in Bruins' territory, including three in the red zone.

=== At Washington ===
UCLA Bruins at Washington Huskies – Game summary

Quarter	1	2	3	4	Total
Bruins	7	10	0	7	24
Huskies	3	7	7	0	17

at Husky Stadium, Seattle, WA

- Date: October 16, 2021
- Game time: 5:30 p.m. PDT
- Game weather: 63 °F (17 °C) Partly Cloudy
- Game attendance: 62,266
- Referee: Francisco Villar
- TV announcers (FOX): Tim Brando (play by play), Spencer Tillman (analyst)
- Game Book

Game information

First quarter

- UW – Peyton Henry 25-yard field goal, 3:23. UW 3–0. Drive: 12 plays, 74 yards, 5:31.
- UCLA – Kam Brown 17-yard pass from Dorian Thompson-Robinson (Nicholas Barr-Mira kick), 0:29. UCLA 7–3. Drive: 6 plays, 75 yards, 2:54.

Second quarter

- UCLA – Nicholas Barr-Mira 39-yard field goal, 7:04. UCLA 10–3. Drive: 8 plays, 51 yards, 4:19.
- UCLA – Dorian Thompson-Robinson 1-yard run (Nicholas Barr-Mira kick), 3:33. UCLA 17–3. Drive: 6 plays, 56 yards, 2:19.
- UW – Rome Odunze 26-yard pass from Dylan Morris (Peyton Henry kick), 0:52. UCLA 17–10. Drive: 8 plays, 69 yards, 2:35.

Third quarter

- UW – Dylan Morris 1-yard run (Peyton Henry kick), 6:55. Tied 17–17. Drive: 9 plays, 75 yards, 4:52.

Fourth quarter

- UCLA – Greg Dulcich 9-yard pass from Dorian Thompson-Robinson (Nicholas Barr-Mira kick), 8:19. UCLA 24–17. Drive: 13 plays, 90 yards, 5:47.

Top passers

- UCLA – Dorian Thompson-Robinson – 21/26, 183 yards, 2 TD
- UW – Dylan Morris – 20/30, 184 yards, TD, 2 INT

Top rushers

- UCLA – Zach Charbonnet – 21 rushes, 131 yards
- UW – Kamari Pleasant – 9 rushes, 80 yards

Top receivers

- UCLA – Chase Cota – 3 receptions, 60 yards
- UW – Rome Odunze – 4 receptions, 58 yards, TD

Thompson-Robinson had three touchdowns and freshman cornerback Devin Kirkwood had an interception late in the game to beat Washington, 24–17. Thompson-Robinson connected with Dulcich for a go-ahead, nine-yard touchdown pass with 8:19 left in the game. Then with 4:50 remaining, Kirkwood recovered for his first career interception after the Huskies' Rome Odzune was open for a potential touchdown. Kirkwood bobbled the ball at first before pulling it away from the Washington receiver. The Bruins improved to 3–0 on the road, and won five games in a season for the first time under Kelly.

UCLA led 17–3 late in the first half after Thompson-Robinson scored on a one-yard run on fourth and goal. Washington pulled to within 17–10 on a 26-yard touchdown catch by Odzune with 52 seconds remaining in the half. The Huskies tied the game at 17 on a fourth-and-goal one-yard run by quarterback Dylan Morris in the second half. On the Bruins' winning drive, Thompson-Robinson was a perfect 8-for-8 passing for 47 yards and ran for 10 yards, including a fourth-and-1 conversion.

Thompson-Robinson completed 21 of 26 passes for 183 yards and two touchdowns and ran for 87 yards and another touchdown. Charbonnet ran for 131 yards. UCLA starting wide receiver Philips did not play for unspecified reasons. At the time, he had a team-high 24 catches for six touchdowns. Despite their rally, Washington had a season-low 267 yards on offense. The Bruins won at Washington for the first time since 2014.

=== vs No. 10 Oregon ===
Homecoming Game

No. 10 Oregon Ducks vs UCLA Bruins – Game summary

Quarter	1	2	3	4	Total
No. 10 Ducks	0	14	13	7	34
Bruins	14	3	0	14	31

at Rose Bowl, Pasadena, CA

- Date: October 23, 2021
- Game time: 12:30 p.m. PDT
- Game weather: 64 °F (18 °C) Cloudy
- Game attendance: 55,675
- Referee: Mark Duddy
- TV announcers (ABC): Chris Fowler (play by play), Kirk Herbstreit (analyst), Holly Rowe (sideline)
- Game Book

Game information

First quarter

- UCLA – Brittain Brown 1-yard run (Nicholas Barr-Mira kick), 9:45. UCLA 7–0. Drive: 12 plays, 75 yards, 5:15.
- UCLA – Kazmeir Allen 4-yard pass from Dorian Thompson-Robinson (Nicholas Barr-Mira kick), 4:08. UCLA 14–0. Drive: 4 plays, 30 yards, 0:59.

Second quarter

- ORE – Travis Dye 1-yard run (Camden Lewis kick), 13:46. UCLA 14–7. Drive: 12 plays, 87 yards, 5:22.
- ORE – Travis Dye 4-yard run (Camden Lewis kick), 2:49. Tied 14–14. Drive: 12 plays, 80 yards, 5:17.
- UCLA – Nicholas Barr-Mira 37-yard field goal, 0:00. UCLA 17–14. Drive: 15 plays, 56 yards, 2:49.

Third quarter

- ORE – Travis Dye 1-yard run (Camden Lewis kick), 12:00. ORE 21–17. Drive: 6 plays, 75 yards, 3:00.
- ORE – Travis Dye 5-yard run (kick failed), 8:52. ORE 27–17. Drive: 4 plays, 22 yards, 2:14.

Fourth quarter

- ORE – Anthony Brown 43-yard run (Camden Lewis kick), 13:53. ORE 34–17. Drive: 3 plays, 62 yards, 0:59.
- UCLA – Dorian Thompson-Robinson 2-yard run (Nicholas Barr-Mira kick), 10:35. ORE 34–24. Drive: 12 plays, 75 yards, 3:18.
- UCLA – Brittain Brown 1-yard run (Nicholas Barr-Mira kick), 6:34. ORE 34–31. Drive: 7 plays, 20 yards, 2:53.

Top passers

- ORE – Anthony Brown – 29/39, 296 yards, 2 INT
- UCLA – Dorian Thompson-Robinson – 22/41, 220 yards, TD, INT

Top rushers

- ORE – Anthony Brown – 6 rushes, 85 yards, TD
- UCLA – Brittain Brown – 13 rushes, 45 yards, 2 TD

Top receivers

- ORE – Devon Williams – 5 receptions, 80 yards
- UCLA – Kyle Philips – 8 receptions, 73 yards

This matchup brought College GameDay to UCLA for the first time since 1998. Oregon was the opponent that time as well.

UCLA jumped out to an early 14–0 lead after a rushing touchdown from Brittain Brown and a receiving touchdown from Kazmeir Allen. On the Ducks next possession, Anthony Brown threw an interception but it was negated due to an offsides penalty on UCLA. Oregon then scored a few plays later to make the score 14–7. On the ensuing drive, UCLA drove down the field but came away with no points because of a missed field goal. Oregon took advantage and scored a touchdown to tie the score, 14-14. Right before the half, UCLA was able to sustain a drive and make a field goal giving them a 17–14 lead.

The second half started with Oregon driving down the field, and scoring a touchdown giving them their first lead of the game at 21–17. On UCLA's first possession of the second half, they were forced to punt but Oregon blocked it. There was targeting on the play originally against the Ducks but it was overturned after review. The Ducks, with great field position, took advantage and scored another touchdown giving them a 27–17 lead. The Ducks would score one more time to make it a 34–17 game.

UCLA started their comeback with a rushing touchdown by Dorian Thompson-Robinson, and then getting the ball back due to a turnover by Oregon QB Anthony Brown, UCLA would score again to make it 34-31. Oregon would drive down the field with less than 4 minutes in the clock, all but icing the game if they’re able to score a touchdown. Oregon’s Anthony Brown ends up forcing another interception, giving UCLA the ball and a chance to win the game. DTR would get hurt on this ensuing possession, forcing backup Ethan Garbers to be the hero for UCLA. He would convert two 4th down plays in a row. Both to Phillips, the third time he would throw a game losing interception. Icing the game and giving Oregon the road win.

=== At Utah ===
UCLA Bruins at Utah Utes – Game summary

Quarter	1	2	3	4	Total
Bruins	3	7	7	7	24
Utes	7	21	0	16	44

at Rice-Eccles Stadium, Salt Lake City, UT

- Date: October 30, 2021
- Game time: 7:00 p.m. PDT
- Game weather: 54 °F (12 °C) Clear
- Game attendance: 51,922
- Referee: Mike McCabe
- TV announcers (ESPN): Dave Flemming (play by play), Rod Gilmore (analyst), Stormy Buonantony (sideline)
- Game Book

Game information

First quarter

- UTAH – Tavion Thomas 10-yard run (Jordan Noyes kick), 11:26. UTAH 7–0. Drive: 9 plays, 75 yards, 3:34.
- UCLA – Nicholas Barr-Mira 28-yard field goal, 3:48. UTAH 7–3. Drive: 16 plays, 65 yards, 7:38.

Second quarter

- UTAH – Tavion Thomas 8-yard run (Jordan Noyes kick), 14:55. UTAH 14–3. Drive: 10 plays, 75 yards, 3:53.
- UCLA – Zach Charbonnet 30-yard run (Nicholas Barr-Mira kick), 9:06. UTAH 14–10. Drive: 12 plays, 75 yards, 5:49.
- UTAH – Dalton Kincaid 4-yard pass from Cameron Rising (Jordan Noyes kick), 5:51. UTAH 21–10. Drive: 7 plays, 75 yards, 3:15.
- UTAH – Tavion Thomas 10-yard run (Jadon Redding kick), 4:27. UTAH 28–10. Drive: 2 plays, 17 yards, 0:35.

Third quarter

- UCLA – Michael Ezeike 6-yard pass from Ethan Garbers (Nicholas Barr-Mira kick), 4:59. UTAH 28–17. Drive: 6 plays, 91 yards, 1:53.

Fourth quarter

- UTAH – Cameron Rising 12-yard run (Jadon Redding kick), 14:55. UTAH 35–17. Drive: 11 plays, 75 yards, 5:04.
- UCLA – Greg Dulcich 9-yard pass from Ethan Garbers (Nicholas Barr-Mira kick), 11:04. UTAH 35–24. Drive: 10 plays, 75 yards, 3:51.
- UTAH – Ethan Garbers tackled in the end zone for a safety, 7:16. UTAH 37–24.
- UTAH – Tavion Thomas 24-yard run (Jadon Redding kick), 4:27. UTAH 44–24. Drive: 7 plays, 58 yards, 2:34.

Top passers

- UCLA – Ethan Garbers – 27/44, 265 yards, 2 TD, INT
- UTAH – Cameron Rising – 17/27, 179 yards, TD

Top rushers

- UCLA – Zach Charbonnet – 11 rushes, 65 yards, TD
- UTAH – Tavion Thomas – 24 rushes, 160 yards, 4 TD

Top receivers

- UCLA – Kyle Philips – 7 receptions, 86 yards
- UTAH – Brant Kuithe – 5 receptions, 63 yards

=== vs Colorado ===
Colorado Buffaloes vs UCLA Bruins – Game summary

Quarter	1	2	3	4	Total
Buffaloes	7	13	0	0	20
Bruins	0	10	20	14	44

at Rose Bowl, Pasadena, CA

- Date: November 13, 2021
- Game time: 6:00 p.m. PST
- Game weather: 73 °F (23 °C) Clear
- Game attendance: 36,573
- Referee: Steven Strimling
- TV announcers (P12N): Ted Robinson (play by play), Yogi Roth (analyst)
- Game Book

Game information

First quarter

- CU – Alex Fontenot 1-yard run (Cole Becker kick), 4:53. CU 7–0. Drive: 12 plays, 70 yards, 6:34.

Second quarter

- CU – Cole Becker 23-yard field goal, 8:37. CU 10–0. Drive: 10 plays, 55 yards, 3:54.
- UCLA – Brittain Brown 1-yard run (Nicholas Barr-Mira kick), 7:56. CU 10–7. Drive: 3 plays, 79 yards, 0:36.
- CU – Alex Fontenot 1-yard run (Cole Becker kick), 5:22. CU 17–7. Drive: 6 plays, 75 yards, 2:34.
- CU – Cole Becker 40-yard field goal, 0:57. CU 20–7. Drive: 8 plays, 49 yards, 2:23.
- UCLA – Nicholas Barr-Mira 41-yard field goal, 0:00. CU 20–10. Drive: 8 plays, 52 yards, 0:57.

Third quarter

- UCLA – Zach Charbonnet 2 yard run (kick missed), 11:33. CU 20–16. Drive: 9 plays, 76 yards, 3:23.
- UCLA – Dorian Thompson-Robinson 23-yard run (Nicholas Barr-Mira kick), 6:07. UCLA 23–20. Drive: 7 plays, 83 yards, 1:54.
- UCLA – Zach Charbonnet 3-yard run (Nicholas Barr-Mira kick), 0:30. UCLA 30–20. Drive: 9 plays, 75 yards, 2:54.

Fourth quarter

- UCLA – Zach Charbonnet 2-yard run (Nicholas Barr-Mira kick), 12:12. UCLA 37–20. Drive: 5 plays, 34 yards, 1:46.
- UCLA – Kyle Philips 82-yard punt return (Nicholas Barr-Mira kick), 10:10. UCLA 44–20.

Top passers

- CU – Brendon Lewis – 17/26, 158 yards
- UCLA – Dorian Thompson-Robinson – 18/27, 257 yards, INT

Top rushers

- CU – Jarek Broussard – 16 rushes, 108 yards
- UCLA – Dorian Thompson-Robinson – 9 rushes, 99 yards, TD

Top receivers

- CU – Daniel Arias – 4 receptions, 70 yards
- UCLA – Kyle Philips – 8 receptions, 99 yards

=== At USC ===
UCLA Bruins at USC Trojans – Game summary

Quarter	1	2	3	4	Total
Bruins	7	21	14	20	62
Trojans	10	7	9	7	33

at Los Angeles Memorial Coliseum, Los Angeles, CA

- Date: November 20, 2021
- Game time: 1:00 p.m. PST
- Game weather: 66 °F (19 °C) Sunny
- Game attendance: 68,152
- Referee: Francisco Villar
- TV announcers (FOX): Joe Davis (play-by-play), Brock Huard (analyst), Bruce Feldman (sideline)
- Game Book

Game information

First quarter

- USC – Alex Stadthaus 29-yard field goal, 10:56. USC 3–0. Drive: 10 plays, 63 yards, 4:04.
- UCLA – Kazmeir Allen 45-yard pass from Dorian Thompson-Robinson (Nicholas Barr-Mira kick), 4:32. UCLA 7–3. Drive: 8 plays, 94 yards, 2:29.
- USC – Vavae Malepeai 7-yard run (Alex Stadthaus kick), 0:10. USC 10–7. Drive: 10 plays, 63 yards, 4:15.

Second quarter

- UCLA – Kyle Philips 23-yard pass from Dorian Thompson-Robinson (Nicholas Barr-Mira kick), 9:33. UCLA 14–10. Drive: 6 plays, 58 yards, 1:52.
- UCLA – Kazmeir Allen 58-yard pass from Dorian Thompson-Robinson (Nicholas Barr-Mira kick), 6:31. UCLA 21–10. Drive: 2 plays, 60 yards, 0:43.
- UCLA – Dorian Thompson-Robinson 4-yard run (Nicholas Barr-Mira kick), 2:13. UCLA 28–10. Drive: 5 plays, 69 yards, 1:23.
- USC – Vavae Malepeai 3-yard run (Alex Stadthaus kick), 0:23. UCLA 28–17. Drive: 8 plays, 67 yards, 1:43.

Third quarter

- UCLA – Kyle Philips 11-yard pass from Dorian Thompson-Robinson (Nicholas Barr-Mira kick), 11:36. UCLA 35–17. Drive: 8 plays, 78 yards, 3:19.
- USC – Alex Stadthaus 23-yard field goal, 5:02. UCLA 35–20. Drive: 16 plays, 65 yards, 6:26.
- USC – Gary Bryant Jr. 44-yard pass from Jaxson Dar] (rush failed), 2:09. UCLA 35–26. Drive: 2 plays, 72 yards, 0:23.
- UCLA – Kazmeir Allen 100-yard kickoff return (Nicholas Barr-Mira kick), 1:56. UCLA 42–26.

Fourth quarter

- UCLA – Zach Charbonnet 4-yard run (pass failed), 10:12. UCLA 48–26. Drive: 11 plays, 98 yards, 5:57.
- USC – Vavae Malepeai 1-yard run (Alex Stadthaus kick), 6:48. UCLA 48–33. Drive: 9 plays, 75 yards, 3:24.
- UCLA – Dorian Thompson-Robinson 15-yard run (Nicholas Barr-Mira kick), 3:47. UCLA 55–33. Drive: 5 plays, 25 yards, 2:58.
- UCLA – Ethan Fernea 42-yard run (Nicholas Barr-Mira kick), 1:09. UCLA 62–33. Drive: 3 plays, 50 yards, 1:41.

Top passers

- UCLA – Dorian Thompson-Robinson – 16/22, 349 yards, 4 TD, 2 INT
- USC – Jaxson Dart – 27/47, 325 yards, TD, 2 INT

Top rushers

- UCLA – Zach Charbonnet – 28 rushes, 167 yards, TD
- USC – Keaontay Ingram – 17 rushes, 96 yards

Top receivers

- UCLA – Kazmeir Allen – 3 receptions, 115 yards, 2 TD
- USC – Gary Bryant Jr. – 9 receptions, 161 yards, TD

UCLA dominated their rivalry game at crosstown foes Southern Cal, 62–33, en route to re-claiming the coveted Victory Bell trophy. In a high-scoring contest, the Bruin offense was sparked by a handful of explosive plays from Kazmeir Allen, who accumulated 215 yards of total offense and scored three touchdowns. Allen hauled in touchdown receptions of 45 and 58 yards during the first half, as UCLA entered the break up 28–17.

Meanwhile, UCLA quarterback Dorian Thompson-Robinson recovered from a poor start–– his first two throws of the game were both interceptions–– and played exceptionally for most of the game, accounting for six total touchdowns (four in the air and two on the ground) and outdueling USC signal-caller Jaxson Dart. UCLA was also effective in the run game despite the absence of Brittain Brown. Tailback Zach Charbonnet rushed for a season-high 167 yards and added a score.

Later in the game, with the third quarter winding down and momentum swinging in favor of USC, who had just cut the deficit to 9 points, a pivotal moment occurred when Allen found paydirt for the third time, returning a USC kickoff 100 yards to the house. This restored UCLA's commanding lead, and the Bruins never looked back from there. Late in the fourth quarter, Thompson-Robinson added an 'exclamation point' when he hurdled over USC cornerback Isaac Taylor-Stuart near the goal-line to score his second rushing touchdown of the day, all but icing the game with the score at 55–33. The Bruins would go on to score one more touchdown before the game ended and hit the 60-point threshold in front of a mostly empty stadium.

This game marked UCLA's 33rd win over USC all-time, and their first win at the Coliseum since 2013. The total of 95 combined points were the most ever scored in a single game between the schools. UCLA's 62 points scored in the game were the most they had ever scored against their crosstown rivals in the history of the series, and it also represented the most points the Trojans had surrendered in a game since their 62–41 loss to Arizona State, in Lane Kiffin's final game before his firing, in 2013. It also marked the Bruins' largest margin of victory over the Trojans since 1954, when UCLA defeated them 34–0.

=== vs California ===
California Golden Bears vs UCLA Bruins – Game summary

Quarter	1	2	3	4	Total
Golden Bears	0	14	0	0	14
Bruins	3	14	10	15	42

at Rose Bowl, Pasadena, CA

- Date: November 27, 2021
- Game time: 7:30 p.m. PST
- Game attendance: 36,156
- Referee: Mike McCabe
- TV announcers (FS1): Aaron Goldsmith (play by play), Mark Helfrich (analyst)
- Game Book

Game information

First quarter

- UCLA – Nicholas Barr-Mira 41-yard field goal, 9:33. UCLA 3–0. Drive: 9 plays, 47 yards, 3:29.

Second quarter

- UCLA – Kyle Philips 4-yard pass from Dorian Thompson-Robinson (Nicholas Barr-Mira kick), 14:10. UCLA 10–0. Drive: 9 plays, 40 yards, 4:05.
- CAL – Christopher Brooks 14-yard run (Dario Longhetto kick), 8:58. UCLA 10–7. Drive: 11 plays, 75 yards, 5:12.
- CAL – Chase Garbers 1-yard run (Dario Longhetto kick), 7:00. CAL 14–10. Drive: 4 plays, 13 yards, 1:54.
- UCLA – Kazmeir Allen 8-yard run (Nicholas Barr-Mira kick), 0:26. UCLA 17–14. Drive: 13 plays, 64 yards, 6:29.

Third quarter

- UCLA – Greg Dulcich 29-yard pass from Dorian Thompson-Robinson (Nicholas Barr-Mira kick), 11:19. UCLA 24–14. Drive: 3 plays, 71 yards, 1:09.
- UCLA – Nicholas Barr-Mira 46-yard field goal, 2:25. UCLA 27–14. Drive: 13 plays, 52 yards, 5:26.

Fourth quarter

- UCLA – Zach Charbonnet 1-yard run (Thompson-Robinson pass to Charbonnet), 13:10. UCLA 35–14. Drive: 6 plays, 80 yards, 2:19.
- UCLA – Kyle Philips 4-yard pass from Dorian Thompson-Robinson (Nicholas Barr-Mira kick), 8:53. UCLA 42–14. Drive: 7 plays, 56 yards, 2:41.

Top passers

- CAL – Chase Garbers – 16/31, 125 yards, 2 INT
- UCLA – Dorian Thompson-Robinson – 19/28, 164 yards, 3 TD

Top rushers

- CAL – Christopher Brooks – 12 rushes, 61 yards, TD
- UCLA – Zach Charbonnet – 22 rushes, 106 yards, TD

Top receivers

- CAL – Kekoa Crawford – 5 receptions, 42 yards
- UCLA – Greg Dulcich – 6 receptions, 86 yards, TD

UCLA scored 32 straight points from the second to fourth quarters to win 42–14 over California. It was the third consecutive win for the Bruins, just the second such streak during Kelly's coaching tenure at UCLA.

== Rankings ==
Ranking movements Legend: ██ Increase in ranking ██ Decrease in ranking — = Not ranked RV = Received votes
	Week															
Poll	Pre	1	2	3	4	5	6	7	8	9	10	11	12	13	14	Final
AP	RV	RV	16	13	24	20	RV	—	RV	RV	—	—	—	—	—	
Coaches	RV	RV	16	13	24	20	—	RV	—	—	—	—	—	RV	RV	
CFP	Not released										—	—	—	—	—	Not released

== Players drafted into the NFL ==
Round	Pick	Player	Position	NFL Club
3	80	Greg Dulcich	TE	Denver Broncos
3	92	Sean Rhyan	OG	Green Bay Packers
5	160	Otito Ogbonnia	DT	Los Angeles Chargers
5	163	Kyle Philips	WR	Tennessee Titans
6	211	Quentin Lake	S	Los Angeles Rams
7	250	Brittain Brown	RB	Las Vegas Raiders

== Statistics ==
Updated through October 27, 2021

Statistics	UCLA	OPP
First downs	175	168
Plays–yards	570–3328	546–3086
Rushes–yards	355–1647	235–759
Passing yards	1679	2327
Passing: comp–att–int	127–215–4	200–311–8
Turnovers		
Time of possession	03:55:54	03:57:17

== Awards and honors ==
Recipient	Award (PAC-12 Conference)	Week #	Date awarded	Ref.
Zach Charbonnet	Offensive Player of the Week	1	September 7, 2021	
Alec Anderson	Offensive Lineman of the Week	1	September 7, 2021	
Kyle Philips	Special Teams Player of the Week	4	September 27, 2021	
Nicholas Barr-Mira	Special Teams Player of the Week	6	October 11, 2021	
Kyle Philips	Special Teams Player of the Week	11	November 15, 2021	
Dorian Thompson-Robinson	Offensive Player of the Week	12	November 22, 2021	
Paul Grattan, Jr	Offensive Lineman of the Week	13	November 29, 2021	
Mitchell Agude	Defensive Lineman of the Week	13	November 29, 2021	

- September 29, 2021 – Shea Pitts is a semifinalist for the 2021 William V. Campbell Trophy
- October 19, 2021 – The offensive line is named to the 2021 Joe Moore Award Midseason Honor Roll.
- October 22, 2021 – Former quarterback Cade McNown will be honored with the naming of Tunnel 8 at the Rose Bowl
- October 22, 2021 – Thompson-Robinson added to the midseason Manning Award List
- October 23, 2021 – UCLA hosted ESPN College Gameday for the first time ever on campus. It was the second time ever (previous time hosting was at the Rose Bowl in 1998).
- November 18, 2021 – Greg Dulcich, Quentin Lake and Jack Landherr IV named to the 2021-22 CoSIDA Academic All-District 8 Football Team (College Sports Information Directors of America)
- November 23, 2021 – Quentin Lake named the Lott IMPACT Trophy Player of the Week
- November 28, 2021 – Team Awards: Quentin Lake, the Bobby Field UCLA Captains Award; Obi Eboh, the Ed "Coach K" Kezirian Award (academic and athletic balance); Zach Charbonnet, the Henry R. "Red" Sanders Award (most valuable player); Brittain Brown, the Kenneth S. Washington Award (outstanding senior of the year); Qwuantrezz Knight, the Jerry Long "Heart" Award; Paul Grattan, Jr., the Iron Bruin Award; Hudson Habermehl, the Jackie R. Robinson Academic Excellence Award (highest grade-point average (GPA))
- December 22, 2021 – Shea Pitts is a final-six candidates for the Pop Warner College Football Award
- April 13, 2022 – Greg Dulcich, Ethan Fernea, Quentin Lake and Otito Ogbonnia were named to the Hampshire Honor Society of the National Football Foundation

=== 2021 All-Pac-12 team ===
- Kyle Philips (WR) First Team, (RS) Second Team
- Greg Dulcich (TE) First Team
- Sean Rhyan (OL) First Team
- Dorian Thompson-Robinson (QB) Second Team
- Zach Charbonnet (RB) Second Team
- Quentin Lake (DB) Second Team
- Qwuantrezz Knight (DB) Second Team
- Mitchell Agude (DL) Second Team
- Brittain Brown (RB) Honorable Mention
- Paul Grattan (OL) Honorable Mention

=== AP All-Pac-12 Football Teams ===
- Dorian Thompson-Robinson, and Greg Dulcich (first team); Kyle Philips, Sean Rhyan, Paul Grattan Jr., Jay Shaw and Quentin Lake (second team); Zach Charbonnet (newcomer of the year)
