= Greg Dulcich =

American football player (born 2000)

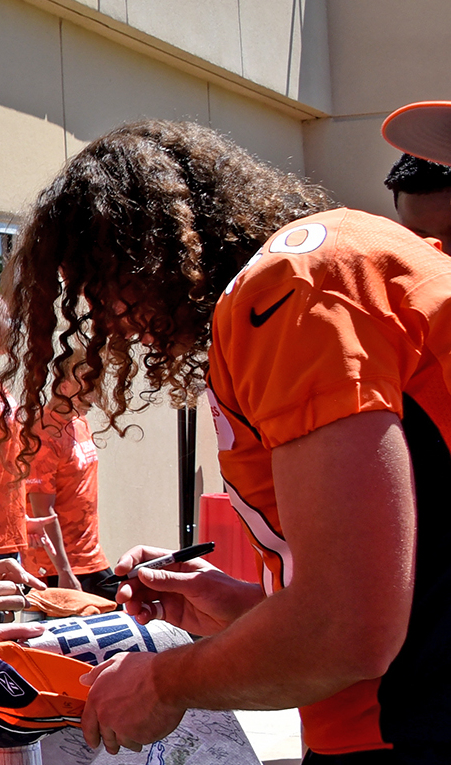
- Dulcich with the Denver Broncos in 2023

No. 85 – Miami Dolphins
- Position: Tight end
- Roster status: Active

Personal information
- Born: March 26, 2000 (age 26); Glendale, California, U.S.
- Listed height: 6 ft 4 in (1.93 m)
- Listed weight: 245 lb (111 kg)

Career information
- High school: St. Francis (La Cañada Flintridge, California)
- College: UCLA (2018–2021)
- NFL draft: 2022: 3rd round, 80th overall pick

Career history
- Denver Broncos (2022–2024); New York Giants (2024); Miami Dolphins (2025–present)

Awards and highlights
- First-team All-Pac-12 (2021); Second-team All-Pac-12 (2020)

Career NFL statistics as of Week 10, 2026
- Receptions: 91
- Receiving yards: 1069
- Receiving touchdowns: 3
- Stats at Pro Football Reference

Gregory Paul Dulcich (/ˈdʌlsɪtʃ/ DUL-sitch; Croatian: Dulčić, pronounced [dǔltʃitɕ]; born March 26, 2000) is an American professional football tight end for the Miami Dolphins of the National Football League (NFL). He played college football for the UCLA Bruins and was twice an all-conference selection in the Pac-12, including first-team honors in 2021. He was selected by the Denver Broncos in the third round of the 2022 NFL draft. He also played for the New York Giants.

== Early life ==
Dulcich was born on March 26, 2000, and grew up in Glendale, California. He attended Saint Francis High School in La Cañada Flintridge. As a junior, he had 30 receptions for 406 yards and four touchdowns. In his senior year, the Golden Knights reached the 2017 CIF Southern Section Division III championship, losing 44–42 to Rancho Verde High School on a last-second field goal. During the season, Dulcich caught 50 passes for 1,168 yards and 12 touchdowns, and ran for another three touchdowns. He also made 21 tackles on defense.

Dulcich was ranked as a three-star recruit by ESPN and listed as the No. 78 recruit in California. He was initially recruited by Derek Sage, who was the receivers coach for Washington State. However, Sage moved to UCLA, as did Dulcich.

== College career ==
A walk-on at the University of California, Los Angeles, Dulcich played three games as a freshman. He appeared in eleven games in 2019, playing on special teams and as a receiver. His first touchdown with the Bruins was against San Diego State on September 7, 2019, when he had three receptions for 37 yards in a home loss at the Rose Bowl, about three miles (4.8 km) from his high school.

In 2020, Dulcich was informed by UCLA on his 20th birthday that he was put on scholarship. He had a breakout year that season, which was shortened by the COVID-19 pandemic, finishing with 26 receptions for 517 yards and five touchdowns. He led the team in both receiving yards and touchdowns, while finishing second in catches to Kyle Philips (38). Dulcich's averages of 19.88 yards per catch and 73.9 receiving yards per game both ranked second in the country among tight ends. He was targeted 18 times on vertical pass routes, catching nine for 321 yards and four touchdowns. Ranked sixth in the Pac-12 in receiving yards per game, he was named second-team All-Pac-12.

In 2021, Dulcich was named to the preseason watch list for the Mackey Award, awarded to the best tight end in the nation. He had three catches for 117 yards, including a 75-yard touchdown, in a win over No. 16 LSU. He logged a career-high nine catches for 136 yards in a loss to Arizona State, his third career game with 100 yards or more. He earned first-team All-Pac-12 honors and finished fifth in the conference in receiving yards per game with 60.4. Dulcich averaged 17.3 yards per catch, which ranked second among tight ends in the nation, and his 725 receiving yards ranked second on the team to Philips (739). He declared for the NFL draft after the season.

== Professional career ==
Pre-draft measurables
Height	Weight	Arm length	Hand span	Wingspan	40-yard dash	10-yard split	20-yard split	20-yard shuttle	Three-cone drill	Vertical jump	Broad jump	Bench press
6 ft 4 in (1.93 m)	243 lb (110 kg)	33 3/8 in (0.85 m)	9 7/8 in (0.25 m)	6 ft 8 3/4 in (2.05 m)	4.69 s	1.63 s	2.67 s	4.37 s	7.05 s	34.0 in (0.86 m)	10 ft 2 in (3.10 m)	16 reps
All values from NFL Combine

=== Denver Broncos ===
Dulcich was selected by the Denver Broncos in the third round of the 2022 NFL draft with the 80th overall pick. He was the third tight end chosen in the draft. Bothered by a hamstring injury during most of training camp, he was placed on injured reserve on August 31, 2022. In Week 6, Dulcich was activated against the Los Angeles Chargers on Monday Night Football, and caught a 39-yard touchdown from Russell Wilson in his NFL debut. He finished his rookie season with 33 catches for 411 yards and two touchdowns in ten games, of which he started six.

On September 16, 2023, Dulcich was placed on injured reserve after suffering a hamstring injury in Week 1. He was activated on October 12, but placed back on injured reserve nine days later with another hamstring injury.

On November 25, 2024, after being a healthy scratch for eight straight games, Dulcich was waived by the Broncos.

=== New York Giants ===
On November 26, 2024, Dulcich was claimed off waivers by the New York Giants.

On August 26, 2025, Dulcich was waived by the Giants as part of final roster cuts.

=== Miami Dolphins ===
On August 28, 2025, Dulcich signed with the Miami Dolphins' practice squad. He was promoted to the active roster on October 22.

On March 11, 2026, Dulcich officially re-signed with the team on a one-year deal worth up to $3.25 million.

== Career statistics ==
=== NFL ===
Year	Team	Games		Receiving				
Year	Team	GP	GS	Rec	Yds	Avg	Lng	TD
2022	DEN	10	6	33	411	12.5	39	2
2023	DEN	2	1	3	25	8.3	13	0
2024	DEN	4	3	5	28	5.6	9	0
2024	NYG	5	0	0	0	–	–	0
2025	MIA	10	3	26	335	12.9	29	1
2026	MIA	8	4	24	270	11.3	|0	
Career		39	17	91	1069	11.7	42	3

=== College ===
Season	Team	GP	Receiving		
Season	Team	GP	Rec	Yds	TD
2018	UCLA	8	1	6	0
2019	UCLA	11	8	105	1
2020	UCLA	7	26	517	5
2021	UCLA	11	42	725	5
Career		37	77	1,353	11

== Personal life ==
Dulcich is of Croatian descent through all four of his grandparents.
