= Brittain Brown =

American football player (born 1997)

No. 38 – Chicago Bears
- Position: Running back
- Roster status: Injured reserve

Personal information
- Born: October 10, 1997 (age 29); Canton, Georgia, U.S.
- Listed height: 6 ft 1 in (1.85 m)
- Listed weight: 205 lb (93 kg)

Career information
- High school: Cherokee (Canton)
- College: Duke (2016–2019); UCLA (2020–2021)
- NFL draft: 2022: 7th round, 250th overall pick

Career history
- Las Vegas Raiders (2022–2023); Seattle Seahawks (2024)*; Chicago Bears (2025–present)
- * Offseason or practice squad member only

Career NFL statistics as of Week 9, 2025
- Rushing yards: 37
- Rushing average: 7.4
- Rushing touchdowns: 1
- Stats at Pro Football Reference

Brittain Brown (born October 10, 1997) is an American professional football running back for the Chicago Bears of the National Football League (NFL). He played college football for the Duke Blue Devils and UCLA Bruins, and shared the Bruins' rushing duties in a two-back system with Zach Charbonnet in the 2021 season. Brown was selected by the Las Vegas Raiders in the seventh round of the 2022 NFL draft.

== College career ==
=== Duke ===
Brown began his collegiate career at Duke. After redshirting during the 2016 season, Brown made his Blue Devils debut in the season opener against North Carolina Central where he ran for a season high 120 yards and a touchdown on 10 carries. In 2019, Brown appeared in three games before sustaining a season ending left shoulder injury.

=== UCLA ===
After four seasons at Duke, Brown transferred to UCLA.

In the 2020 season finale against Stanford, Brown ran for a career high 219 yards on 29 carries in a double overtime loss. In 2021, Brown ran for a career high two touchdowns against Oregon. Brown finished his collegiate career with 2,284 rushing yards and 21 touchdowns.

== Professional career ==
Pre-draft measurables
Height	Weight	Arm length	Hand span	Wingspan	40-yard dash	10-yard split	20-yard split	20-yard shuttle	Three-cone drill	Vertical jump	Broad jump	Bench press
6 ft 0 1/2 in (1.84 m)	208 lb (94 kg)	31 3/4 in (0.81 m)	10 5/8 in (0.27 m)	6 ft 4 3/8 in (1.94 m)	4.69 s	1.69 s	2.70 s	4.31 s	7.12 s	34.0 in (0.86 m)	10 ft 4 in (3.15 m)	16 reps
All values from Pro Day

=== Las Vegas Raiders ===
Brown was selected by the Las Vegas Raiders in the seventh round, 250th overall, of the 2022 NFL draft. He finished his rookie year with six appearances on special teams.

On August 27, 2023, Brown was placed on injured reserve. On August 27, 2024, he was waived by the Raiders as part of final roster cuts.

=== Seattle Seahawks ===
On September 18, 2024, Brown was signed to the Seattle Seahawks practice squad. He was released by the Seahawks on November 26, and re-signed to the practice squad on December 11.

=== Chicago Bears ===
On August 11, 2025, Brown signed with the Chicago Bears. He was waived by the Bears on August 26 as part of final roster cuts and re-signed to the practice squad the following day. Due to injuries, Brown was elevated to the active roster on November 1 ahead of the Bears' Week 9 game against the Cincinnati Bengals. As the backup halfback in his first regular season game since the end of 2022, Brown ran five times for 37 yards and his first career touchdown on a 22-yard run to help the Bears win. Brown returned to the practice squad the next week. He was signed to the active roster on November 22. Brown was waived by the Bears on November 27, and re-signed to the practice squad. On January 20, 2026, he signed a reserve/futures contract.

On August 30, 2026, Brown was placed on season–ending injured reserve.

== Career statistics ==
=== NFL ===
Regular season

Year	Team	Games		Rushing					Receiving				
Year	Team	GP	GS	Att	Yds	Avg	Lng	TD	Rec	Yds	Avg	Lng	TD
2022	LV	6	0										
2023	LV	0	0	Did not play due to injury									
2025	CHI	1	0	5	37	7.4	22T	1	0	0	0.0	0	0
Career		7	0	5	37	7.4	22T	1	0	0	0.0	0	0

=== College ===
Season	Team	Games		Rushing				Receiving			
Season	Team	GP	GS	Att	Yds	Avg	TD	Rec	Yds	Avg	TD
2016	Duke	Redshirted (redshirt)									
2017	Duke	13	0	130	701	5.4	7	14	161	11.5	0
2018	Duke	9	5	80	369	4.6	3	1	44	44.0	1
2019	Duke	3	0	12	56	4.7	0	2	13	6.5	0
2020	UCLA	7	2	82	543	6.6	4	6	84	14.0	1
2021	UCLA	10	4	102	615	6.0	7	18	129	7.2	0
Career		42	11	406	2,284	5.6	21	41	431	10.5	2

== Personal life ==
His older brother, Blace Brown, played college football for the Troy Trojans, and played defensive back in the Canadian Football League for the Saskatchewan Roughriders from 2019 to 2022. They also have two younger sisters, Kammann and Chatham. He is the nephew of Heisman Trophy winner Herschel Walker.

Brown majored in computer science and education studies in college. When he was a free agent in 2025, he underwent cybersecurity training while searching for sales jobs.
