= Zach Charbonnet =

American football player (born 2001)

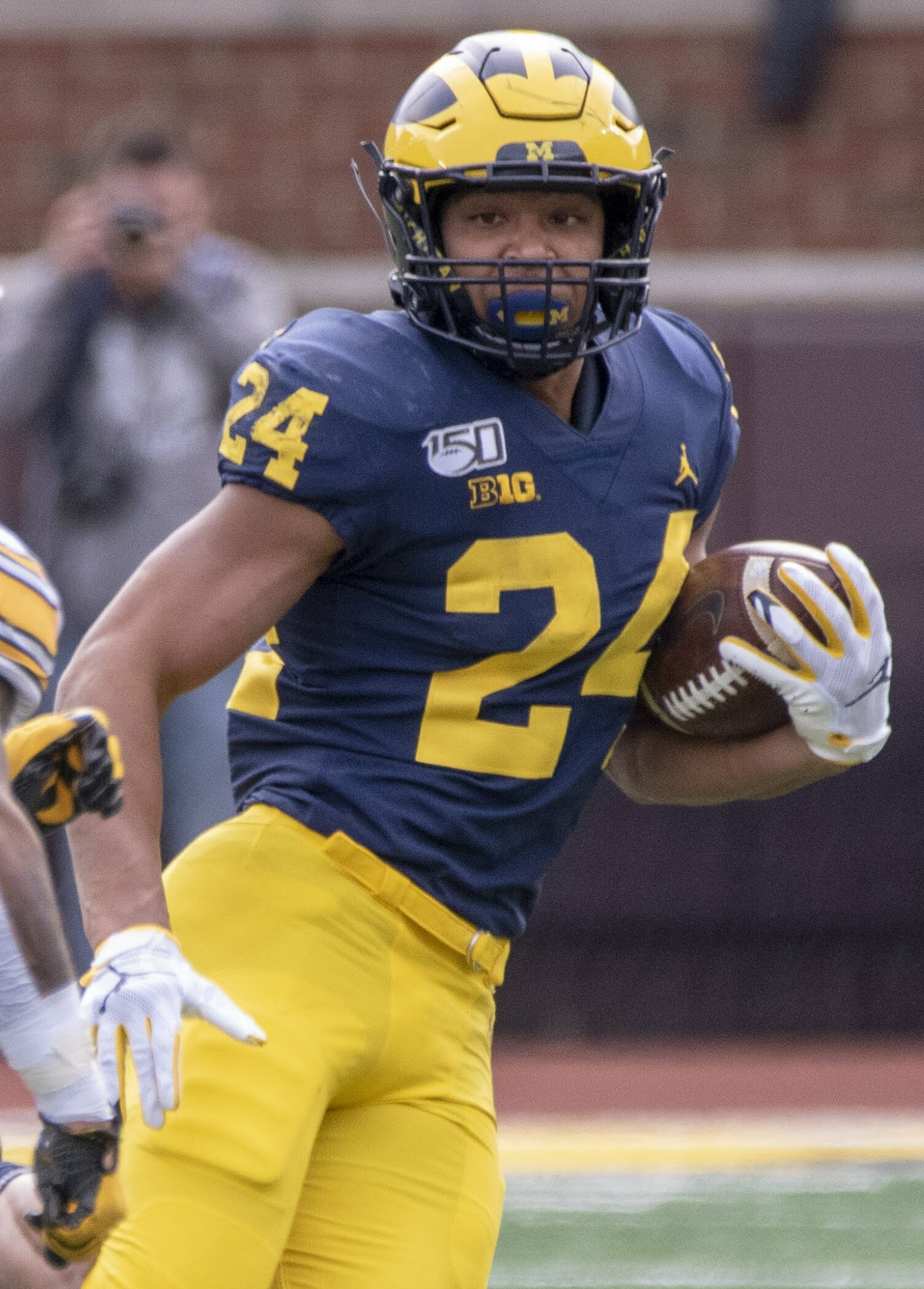
- Charbonnet with Michigan in 2019

No. 26 – Seattle Seahawks
- Position: Running back
- Roster status: Active

Personal information
- Born: January 8, 2001 (age 25); Bellflower, California, U.S.
- Listed height: 6 ft 1 in (1.85 m)
- Listed weight: 214 lb (97 kg)

Career information
- High school: Oaks Christian (Westlake Village, California)
- College: Michigan (2019–2020); UCLA (2021–2022)
- NFL draft: 2023: 2nd round, 52nd overall pick

Career history
- Seattle Seahawks (2023–present)

Awards and highlights
- Super Bowl champion (LX); First-team All-American (2022); First-team All-Pac-12 (2022); Second-team All-Pac-12 (2021); Third-team All-Big Ten (2019)

Career NFL statistics as of Week 10, 2026
- Rushing yards: 1,955
- Rushing average: 4.2
- Rushing touchdowns: 21
- Receptions: 99
- Receiving yards: 708
- Receiving touchdowns: 1
- Stats at Pro Football Reference

Zachariah Charbonnet (/ˈʃɑːrbəneɪ/ SHAR-bə-nay; born January 8, 2001) is an American professional football running back for the Seattle Seahawks of the National Football League (NFL). He played college football for the Michigan Wolverines and UCLA Bruins. He was a two-time All-Pac-12 Conference selection with the Bruins, earning first-time All-American honors as a senior in 2022. Charbonnet was selected by the Seahawks in the second round of the 2023 NFL draft.

== Early life ==
Zach Charbonnet was born on January 8, 2001, and grew up in Camarillo, California. His mother, Seda, is part Cambodian and Chinese, and she immigrated to the United States from France. His father, Mark, is African-American. Charbonnet did not begin playing football until the seventh grade.

He attended Oaks Christian School in Westlake Village, California, where he tallied 4,741 rushing yards and 62 total touchdowns, most of which stemmed from his junior year where he recorded 2,049 yards and 23 touchdowns. Former Oaks Christian coach Jim Benkert described Charbonnet as follows: "He's the best there is. He's got all the measurements and loves the game. He's one of those guys who can take over a game on either side of the ball and is probably the best running back in the country. He competes at a high level on every play. You can't coach that kind of stuff. He's a throwback player. He does his job and doesn't care about statistics. All he cares about is winning."

Charbonnet was rated among the top running back prospects in the country – ranked No. 3 by 247Sports.com, No. 4 by Rivals.com, and No. 6 by ESPN.com. He was also invited to play in the 2019 Under Armour All-America Game. On June 23, 2018, prior to the start of his senior year in high school, Charbonnet committed to play college football at the University of Michigan.

== College career ==
=== Michigan ===
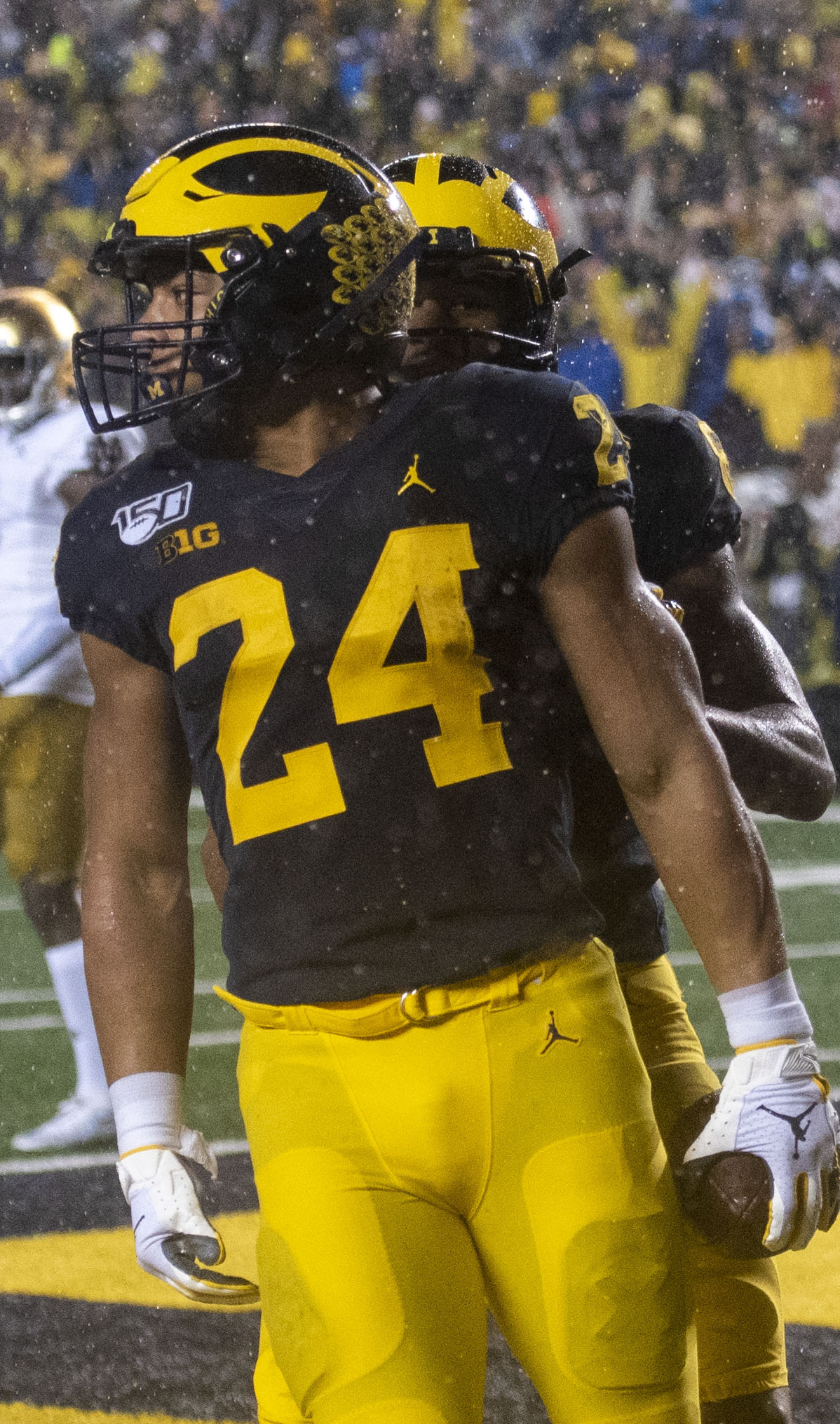
Charbonnet in 2019.

Shortly after his enrollment at Michigan in January 2019, Charbonnet underwent knee surgery. He missed spring practice while recuperating, but was recovered by late summer.

Charbonnet started at running back in Michigan's 2019 season opener where he totaled 99 all-purpose yards, 90 rushing yards on eight carries and nine receiving yards on two receptions. On September 7 against Army, Charbonnet had his first 100-yard rushing game on 33 carries and recorded three touchdowns, one of which was his first collegiate touchdown, in the 24–21 double overtime victory. On October 12 against Illinois, Charbonnet had 108 rushing yards in the first half, the first Wolverine to do so since Karan Higdon in the previous season. He finished the 42–25 road win with 116 yards on 18 carries and a rushing touchdown. On November 2 against Maryland, Charbonnet recorded two receiving touchdowns in the 38–7 win, setting a Michigan program record for most touchdowns by a freshman (11).

Charbonnet concluded the 2019 season with 149 carries for 726 yards and 11 touchdowns. During the 2020 season, which was shortened due to the COVID-19 pandemic, Charbonnet played in five of six games and totaled 19 carries for 124 yards with one touchdown. In January 2021, Charbonnet announced his intent to transfer and entered the NCAA transfer portal.

=== UCLA ===
On January 30, 2021, Charbonnet announced his intention to transfer to the University of California, Los Angeles. During the 2021 season, he and Brittain Brown shared the Bruins' rushing duties in a two-back system. While Brown was injured during UCLA's game against USC, Charbonnet had season-highs in carries (28) and rushing yards (167), while surpassing 1,000 yards on the ground for the season. For his efforts, Pac-12 coaches voted Charbonnet second-team all-conference, and the Associated Press named him the conference's newcomer of the year. He finished the season with 204 carries for 1,137 yards and 13 rushing touchdowns, ranking second in the conference in rushing yards per game (94.8) behind B. J. Baylor of Oregon State.

On January 14, 2022, Charbonnet announced that he would return to UCLA in 2022 for his senior season. On September 24, he made 3 rushing touchdowns in a 45–17 road win over Colorado. On October 8, he had 22 carries for a career-high 198 yards and a rushing touchdown in a 42–32 win over No. 11 Utah. Three weeks later against Stanford, he tied his career-high 198 rushing yards on 21 carries in the 38–13 win, scoring three touchdowns while also leading the team with five receptions for a season-high 61 yards. The following week, he scored another three rushing touchdowns, compiling 24 carries for 181 yards, in a 28–34 loss to Arizona. Charbonnet finished his senior season with 195 carries for 1,359 yards and 14 rushing touchdowns, while catching 37 passes for 321 yards. He was named a first-team All-American as an all-purpose specialist by the Football Writers Association of America. Charbonnet was seventh in the nation in rushing yards per attempt (7.0), and his 1,680 all-purpose yards were the seventh-highest single-season total in UCLA history. After the season, Charbonnet declared for the 2023 NFL draft, forgoing his remaining year of eligibility, which was granted by the NCAA for all players on a roster during the 2020 season impacted by the COVID-19 pandemic.

== Professional career ==
Pre-draft measurables
Height	Weight	Arm length	Hand span	Wingspan	40-yard dash	10-yard split	20-yard split	20-yard shuttle	Three-cone drill	Vertical jump	Broad jump	Bench press
6 ft 0 3/8 in (1.84 m)	214 lb (97 kg)	32 in (0.81 m)	9 7/8 in (0.25 m)	6 ft 3 5/8 in (1.92 m)	4.53 s	1.54 s	2.58 s	4.46 s	7.16 s	37.0 in (0.94 m)	10 ft 2 in (3.10 m)	18 reps
All values from NFL Combine/Pro Day

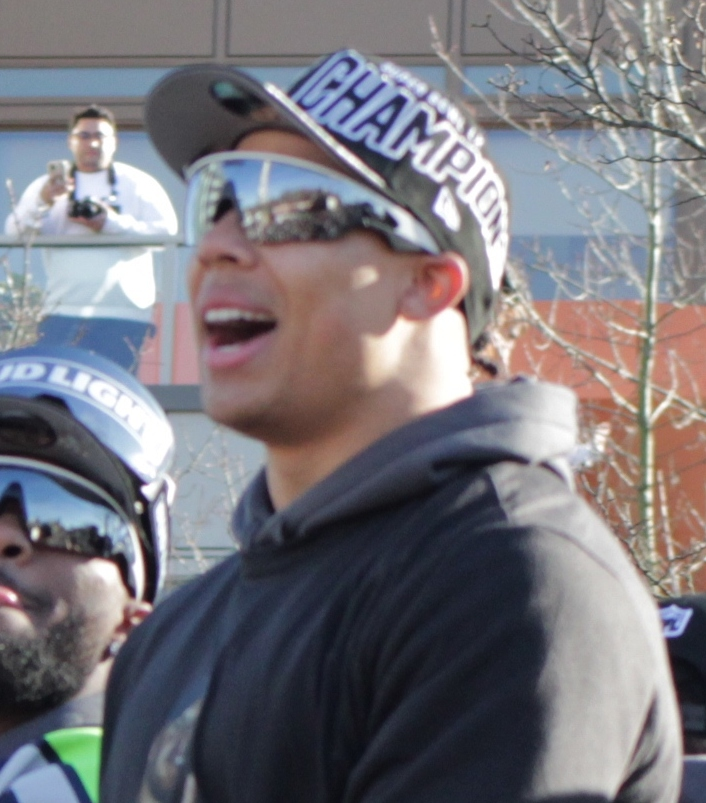
Charbonnet at the Seahawks Superbowl Parade.

=== 2023 season ===
Charbonnet was selected by the Seattle Seahawks in the second round, 52nd overall, of the 2023 NFL draft. In Week 13 of his rookie season against the Dallas Cowboys, he scored his first NFL touchdown on a one-yard rush in the second quarter of a 35–41 loss on the road. As a rookie, Charbonnet appeared in 16 games, starting two. He finished with 108 carries for 462 yards and one rushing touchdown, to go with 33 receptions for 209 yards.

=== 2024 season ===
In Week 3 of the 2024 season, Charbonnet had his first multi-touchdown game, scoring 2 in 18 carries for 91 yards; Seattle went on to win 24–3 against the Miami Dolphins at home. In Week 14, he had his first career game with 100+ rushing yards, making 22 carries for a season-high 134 yards coupled with 2 touchdowns, and 7 receptions for a season-high 59 yards, in their 30–18 win over the Arizona Cardinals on the road. Charbonnet finished the season appearing in all 17 games (including six starts), compiling 135 carries for 569 yards and eight rushing touchdowns, to go with 42 receptions for 340 yards and 1 touchdown through the air.

=== 2025 season ===
Splitting time in 2025 with Kenneth Walker III, who ran for a team-high 1,027 yards, Charbonnet rushed for 730 yards and a team-leading 12 touchdowns. On January 19, 2026, Charbonnet suffered a season-ending ACL tear during the team's divisional round victory over the San Francisco 49ers. Charbonnet won his first NFL championship when the Seahawks defeated the New England Patriots 29–13 in Super Bowl LX.

=== 2026 season ===
Recovering from his ACL tear in the divisional round of the playoffs in 2025, Charbonnet started the 2026 season on the PUP list, slating him to miss the first four games. He was activated on October 22.

== Career statistics ==
=== NFL ===
Regular season

Legend
**Bold**	Career high

Year	Team	Games		Rushing					Receiving					Fumbles	
Year	Team	GP	GS	Att	Yds	Avg	Lng	TD	Rec	Yds	Avg	Lng	TD	Fum	Lost
2023	SEA	16	2	108	462	**4.3**	23	1	33	209	6.3	**39**	0	0	0
2024	SEA	**17**	**11**	135	569	4.2	**51**	8	**42**	**340**	**8.1**	32	**1**	0	0
2025	SEA	16	0	**184**	**730**	4.0	30	**12**	20	144	7.2	21	0	0	0
2026	SEA	3	3	42	194	4.6	24	0	4	15	3.8	9	0	0	0
Career		52	11	469	1,955	4.2	51	21	99	708	7.2	39	1	0	0

Playoffs

Year	Team	Games		Rushing					Receiving					Fumbles	
Year	Team	GP	GS	Att	Yds	Avg	Lng	TD	Rec	Yds	Avg	Lng	TD	Fum	Lost
2025	SEA	**1**	**0**	**5**	**20**	4.0	**15**	**0**	**0**	**0**	**0.0**	0	**0**	0	0
Career		1	0	5	20	4.0	15	0	0	0	0.0	0	0	0	0

=== College ===
Season	Team	Conf	GP	Rushing				Receiving			
Season	Team	Conf	GP	Att	Yds	Avg	TD	Rec	Yds	Avg	TD
2019	Michigan	Big Ten	13	149	726	4.9	11	8	30	3.8	0
2020	Michigan	Big Ten	5	19	124	6.5	1	6	41	6.8	0
2021	UCLA	Pac-12	12	202	1,137	5.6	13	24	197	8.2	0
2022	UCLA	Pac-12	10	195	1,359	7.0	14	37	321	8.7	0
Career			40	565	3,346	5.9	39	75	589	7.9	0
