= 2020 UCLA Bruins football team =

American college football season

2020 UCLA Bruins football
- Conference: Pac-12 Conference
- South Division
- Record: 3–4 (3–4 Pac-12)
- Head coach: Chip Kelly (3rd season)
- Offensive coordinator: Justin Frye (2nd season)
- Offensive scheme: Spread option
- Defensive coordinator: Jerry Azzinaro (3rd season)
- Base defense: 4–2–5
- Home stadium: Rose Bowl

Uniform
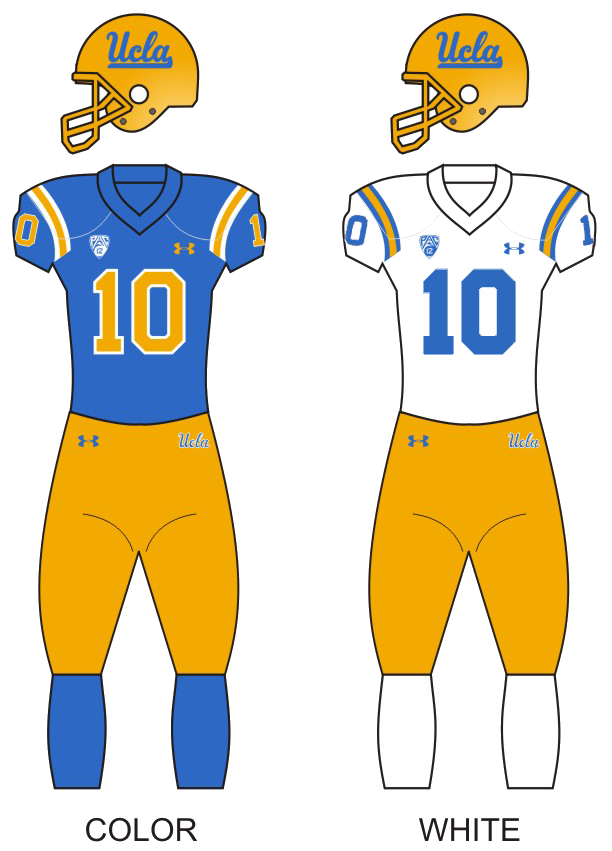

2020 Pac-12 Conference football standings
	Conf.			Overall
Team	W		L	W		L
North Division
Washington x	3	–	1	3	–	1
Oregon y$	3	–	2	4	–	3
Stanford	4	–	2	4	–	2
California	1	–	3	1	–	3
Washington State	1	–	3	1	–	3
Oregon State	2	–	5	2	–	5
South Division
No. 21 USC xy	5	–	0	5	–	1
Colorado	3	–	1	4	–	2
Utah	3	–	2	3	–	2
Arizona State	2	–	2	2	–	2
UCLA	3	–	4	3	–	4
Arizona	0	–	5	0	–	5
Championship: Oregon 31, USC 24
$ – Conference champion; x – Division champion/co-champions; y – Championship game participant; Note: Due to COVID-19, the Pac-12 suspended the season on August 11, but later decided to begin play on November 6. In addition to the title game on December 18, the conference seeded all remaining teams for a game during that weekend.; Rankings from AP Poll.

The 2020 UCLA Bruins football team represented the University of California, Los Angeles during the 2020 NCAA Division I FBS football season. The team was led by third-year head coach Chip Kelly and competed as members of the Pac-12 Conference in the South Division.

On August 11, the Pac-12 Conference initially canceled all fall sports competitions due to the COVID-19 pandemic. On September 24, the conference announced that a six-game conference-only season would begin on November 6, with the Pac-12 Championship Game to be played December 18. Teams not selected for the championship game would be seeded to play a seventh game.

On December 17, with a 3–3 record and one game left to play, the program announced that they would decline any invitation to a bowl game. The Bruins lost their final game, finishing their season with a 3–4 record. The combined deficit in their four defeats was only 15 points, including a one-point loss to Stanford in double overtime, 48–47, in the season finale.

Overall on the season, the Bruins outscored their opponents by a total of 248 to 215.

== Offseason ==
=== Position key ===
Back	B	Center	C	Cornerback	CB	Defensive back	DB
Defensive end	DE	Defensive lineman	DL	Defensive tackle	DT	End	E
Fullback	FB	Guard	G	Halfback	HB	Kicker	K
Kickoff returner	KR	Offensive tackle	OT	Offensive lineman	OL	Linebacker	LB
Long snapper	LS	Punter	P	Punt returner	PR	Quarterback	QB
Running back	RB	Safety	S	Tight end	TE	Wide receiver	WR

=== Impact of coronavirus pandemic ===
On August 5, 2020, the Los Angeles County Health Director announced that eight UCLA football players tested positive for COVID-19.

== Preseason ==
=== Pac-12 media days ===
The Preseason Media poll shows the Bruins at 4th place in the South Division.

== Personnel ==
=== Coaching staff ===
- Head coach: Chip Kelly (New Hampshire '90) 3rd year
- Defensive coordinator: Jerry Azzinaro 3rd year
- Quarterbacks: Dana Bible 3rd year
- Receivers: Jimmie Dougherty 4th year
- Running backs: DeShaun Foster 4th year
- Offensive coordinator / Off. Line: Justin Frye 3rd year
- Outside linebackers: Jason Kaufusi 2nd year
- Defensive line: Johnny Nansen 1st Year
- Asst. head coach/passing game coord./ defensive backs: Brian Norwood 1st year
- Inside linebackers: Don Pellum 3rd year
- Tight ends / special teams: Derek Sage 3rd year
- Director of football performance: Frank Wintrich 3rd year

=== Roster ===
2020 UCLA Bruins Roster
Quarterback: 1 Dorian Thompson-Robinson – Junior; 3 Chase Artopoeus – Sophomore; 4 Blake Kirshner – Sophomore; 9 Parker McQuarrie – (redshirt) Freshman; 11 Chase Griffin – Sophomore; Running back: 6 Martell Irby – Junior; 10 Demetric Felton – Senior; 19 Kazmeir Allen – Junior; 22 Keegan Jones – Sophomore; 24 Brian Kowall – Freshman; 28 Brittain Brown – (redshirt) Graduate Student; 32 Christian Grubb – Sophomore; 33 Jahmon McClendon – Sophomore; 39 Cole Kinder – Junior; Receiver: 2 Kyle Philips – (redshirt) Sophomore; 7 Colson Yankoff – (redshirt) Sophomore; 12 Matt Sykes – (redshirt) Freshman; 14 Josiah Norwood – (redshirt) Sophomore; 15 Jaylen Erwin – Senior; 17 Logan Loya – (redshirt) Freshman; 18 Charles Njoku – Sophomore; 21 Michael Ezeike – Junior; 23 Chase Cota – Junior; 26 Ashton Authement – Sophomore; 29 Delon Hurt – Junior; 35 Devanti Dillard – Freshman; 36 Ethan Fernea – Senior; 81 Hudson Habermehl – Sophomore; 86 Bradley Schlom – Freshman; Tight end: 37 Lucas Egurbide – (redshirt) Freshman; 82 Evidence Njoku – Junior; 83 David Priebe – (redshirt) Sophomore; 85 Greg Dulcich – (redshirt) Sophomore; 87 Grant Norberg – (redshirt) Freshman; 88 Mike Martinez – Sophomore; 89 Michael Churich – Sophomore	Offensive lineman: 53 Luke Young – Sophomore; 54 Josh Carlin- (redshirt) Sophomore; 55 Paul Grattan, Jr. – Graduate Student; 56 Atonio Mafi – (redshirt) Junior; 57 Jon Gaines II – Sophomore; 59 Siale Taupaki – (redshirt) Sophomore; 62 Duke Clemens – (redshirt) Sophomore; 63 Brad Whitworth – (redshirt) Freshman; 64 Sam Marrazzo – Junior; 65 Justin Williams – (redshirt) Freshman; 70 Alec Anderson – (redshirt) Sophomore; 71 Baraka Beckett – (redshirt) Sophomore; 74 Sean Rhyan – Sophomore; 75 Bruno Fina – Freshman; 76 Patrick Selna – Freshman; 77 Beau Taylor – Freshman; 78 Lucas Gramlick – (redshirt) Sophomore; Defensive lineman: 44 Martin Andrus, Jr. – Junior; 50 Tyler Manoa – Junior; 51 Ethan Matus – (redshirt) Sophomore; 53 Winston Polite – (redshirt) Sophomore; 55 Steven Mason – (redshirt) Senior; 58 Datona Jackson – Senior; 61 Carson Drake – Freshman; 91 Otito Ogbonnia – Junior; 92 Osa Odighizuwa – (redshirt) Senior; 94 Dovid Magna – Freshman; 97 Odua Isibor – (redshirt) Junior	Linebacker: 0 Damian Sellers – (redshirt) Freshman; 9 Choé Bryant-Strother – (redshirt) Freshman; 11 Kenny Mestidor – Freshman; 20 Kain Medrano – Freshman; 25 Myles Jackson – (redshirt) Freshman; 26 Leni Toailoa – (redshirt) Senior; 29 Adam Cohen – Sophomore; 31 Ioholani Raass – Freshman; 33 Bo Calvert – Junior; 35 Carl Jones, Jr. – Sophomore; 40 Caleb Johnson – (redshirt) Junior; 43 James Dinneen – Freshman; 45 Mitchell Agude – Junior; 46 Hayden Harris – Freshman; 47 Erich Osteen – Freshman; 47 Shea Pitts – (redshirt) Junior; 48 Joquarri Price – (redshirt) Freshman; 49 Jonny Garnett – Freshman; 52 Jeremiah Trojan – Freshman; 54 John Ward – Freshman; 56 Kobey Fitzgerald – Junior; 95 Sitiveni Havili-Kaufusi – Freshman; 98 Jaymax Jacobsen – Freshman; Defensive back: 1 Jay Shaw – Junior; 3 Rayshad Williams – (redshirt) Sophomore; 4 Stephan Blaylock – Junior; 6 John Humphrey – Freshman; 7 Mo Osling III – (redshirt) Junior; 10 Joshua Swift – (redshirt) Freshman; 12 Elijah Gates – Junior; 14 DJ Warnell – (redshirt) Freshman; 15 Jake Newman – (redshirt) Freshman; 17 Parker Hogan – (redshirt) Freshman; 18 Deavyn Woullard – Freshman; 19 Alex Johnson – (redshirt) Sophomore; 20 Grady Liddell – (redshirt) Freshman; 21 JonJon Vaughns – Freshman; 22 Obi Eboh – Graduate Student; 23 Shamar Martin – Freshman; 24 Qwuantrezz Knight – Graduate Student; 27 Patrick Jolly, Jr. – Sophomore; 28 Kenny Churchwell III – Sophomore; 28 Evan Thomas – Sophomore; 30 William Nimmo, Jr. – Sophomore; 37 Quentin Lake – Junior; 39 Kaleb Tuliau – Kaleb Tuliau; 41 Jelani Warren – Freshman; Punter: 49 Collin Flintoft – (redshirt) Sophomore; Kicker: 2 Nicholas Barr-Mira – Sophomore; 90 Anthony Waller – Freshman; 93 RJ Lopez – Freshman; 96 Ari Libenson – Freshman; 99 Luke Akers – Freshman; Long snapper: 51 Jack Landherr IV – Sophomore; 60 Beau Gardner – Freshman

== Schedule ==
UCLA's 2020 regular season was announced on January 16. The Bruins had games scheduled against New Mexico State, Hawaii, and San Diego State, but canceled these games on July 10 due to the Pac-12 Conference's decision to play a conference-only schedule due to the COVID-19 pandemic.

On November 13, UCLA's scheduled home game against Utah was canceled after a COVID-19 outbreak within the Utah program. The same day, the Pac-12 announced UCLA would instead host California the morning of November 15; the Golden Bears' scheduled game at Arizona State had also been canceled after Arizona State had a COVID-19 outbreak. UCLA's game at Oregon was moved by a day to Saturday, November 21, to accommodate the other changes.

Original 2020 UCLA Bruins schedule
Date	Opponent	Site
August 29	New Mexico State*	Rose Bowl • Pasadena, CA
September 5	at Hawaii*	Aloha Stadium • Honolulu, HI
September 19	at San Diego State*	SDCCU Stadium • San Diego, CA
September 26	Stanford	Rose Bowl • Pasadena, CA (rivalry)
October 3	Arizona	Rose Bowl • Pasadena, CA
October 10	at Arizona State	Sun Devil Stadium • Tempe, AZ
October 17	at Colorado	Folsom Field • Boulder, CO
October 29	Utah	Rose Bowl • Pasadena, CA
November 7	at Oregon State	Reser Stadium • Corvallis, OR
November 14	Washington State	Rose Bowl • Pasadena, CA
November 21	USC	Rose Bowl • Pasadena, CA (Victory Bell)
November 27	at California	California Memorial Stadium • Berkeley, CA (rivalry)

Date	Time	Opponent	Site	TV	Result	Attendance
November 7	4:00 p.m.	at Colorado	Folsom Field; Boulder, CO	ESPN2	L 42–48	554
November 15	9:00 a.m.	California^{†}	Rose Bowl; Pasadena, CA (rivalry)	FS1	W 34–10	—
November 21	12:30 p.m.	at No. 11 Oregon	Autzen Stadium; Eugene, OR	ESPN2	L 35–38	—
November 28	5:00 p.m.	Arizona	Rose Bowl; Pasadena, CA	FOX	W 27–10	—
December 5	7:30 p.m.	at Arizona State	Sun Devil Stadium; Tempe, AZ	FS1	W 25–18	—
December 12	4:30 p.m.	No. 15 USC	Rose Bowl; Pasadena, CA (Victory Bell)	ABC	L 38–43	—
December 19	4:00 p.m.	Stanford	Rose Bowl; Pasadena, CA (rivalry)	ESPN	L 47–48 ^{2OT}	—
^{†}Homecoming; Rankings from AP Poll released prior to the game; All times are in Pacific time

== Game summaries ==
=== At Colorado ===
UCLA Bruins at Colorado Buffaloes

Quarter	1	2	3	4	Total
Bruins	7	7	21	7	42
Buffaloes	14	21	10	3	48

at Folsom Field, Boulder, Colorado

- Date: November 7, 2020
- Game time: 5:00 p.m PT
- Game weather: 59 °F (15 °C) Partly Cloudy, 36% precipitation
- Game attendance: 554
- Referee: Mike McMabe
- TV announcers (ESPN2): Beth Mowins, Kirk Morrison, John Schiffren

Game information

First quarter

- COLO – Jarek Broussard 6-yard run (James Stefanou kick), 10:00. Colorado 7–0. Drive: 4 plays, 25 yards, 1:27.
- COLO – Jarek Broussard 1-yard run (James Stefanou kick), 8:01. Colorado 14–0. Drive: 1 play, 1 yard, 0:04.
- UCLA – Demetric Felton 28-yard pass from Dorian Thompson-Robinson (Nicholas Barr-Mira kick), 1:12. Colorado 14–7. Drive: 6 plays, 60 yards, 1:25.

Second quarter

- COLO – Brady Russell 12-yard pass from Sam Noyer (James Stefanou kick), 12:56. Colorado 21–7. Drive: 10 plays, 76 yards, 3:11.
- COLO – Jarek Broussard 1-yard run (James Stefanou kick), 8:35. Colorado 28–7. Drive: 2 plays, 7 yards, 0:33.
- COLO – Jaren Mangham 2-yard run (James Stefanou kick), 5:46. Colorado 35–7. Drive: 6 plays, 70 yards, 2:16.
- UCLA – Greg Dulcich 52-yard pass from Dorian Thompson-Robinson (Nicholas Barr-Mira kick), 4:44. Colorado 35–14. Drive: 3 plays, 65 yards, 1:02.

Third quarter

- UCLA – Dorian Thompson-Robinson 65-yard run (Nicholas Barr-Mira kick), 14:24. Colorado 35–21. Drive: 2 plays, 75 yards, 0:36.
- UCLA – Demetric Felton 15-yard run (Nicholas Barr-Mira kick), 10:10. Colorado 35–28. Drive: 6 plays, 77 yards, 1:26.
- COLO – Sam Noyer 1-yard run (Evan Price kick), 6:41. Colorado 42–28. Drive: 10 plays, 75 yards, 3:29.
- UCLA – Keegan Jones 26-yard pass from Dorian Thompson-Robinson (Nicholas Barr-Mira kick), 5:19. Colorado 42–35. Drive: 4 plays, 75 yards, 1:22.
- COLO – Evan Price 45-yard field goal, 0:21. Colorado 45–35. Drive: 13 plays, 48 yards, 4:58.

Fourth quarter

- COLO – Evan Price 36-yard field goal, 9:26. Colorado 48–35. Drive: 8 plays, 52 yards, 3:47.
- UCLA – Mike Martinez 9-yard pass from Dorian Thompson-Robinson (Nicholas Barr-Mira kick), 1:45. Colorado 48–42. Drive: 10 plays, 63 yards, 1:35.

Top passers

- UCLA – Dorian Thompson-Robinson – 20/40, 303 yards, 4 TD, INT
- COLO – Sam Noyer – 20/31, 257 yards, TD

Top rushers

- UCLA – Dorian Thompson-Robinson – 9 rushes, 109 yards, TD
- COLO – Jarek Broussard – 31 rushes, 187 yards, 3 TD

Top receivers

- UCLA – Greg Dulcich – 4 receptions, 126 yards, TD
- COLO – Brady Russell – 5 receptions, 77 yards, TD

While UCLA attempted a valiant second-half comeback, their four turnovers in the first half proved too much to overcome and the Bruins were defeated, 48–42.

=== California ===
UCLA Bruins vs. California Golden Bears

Quarter	1	2	3	4	Total
Golden Bears	3	7	0	0	10
Bruins	7	20	0	7	34

at Rose Bowl, Pasadena, California

- Date: November 15, 2020
- Game time: 9:00 a.m PST
- Game weather: 65 °F (18 °C) Clear, Sunny
- Game attendance: 0
- Referee: Steven Strimlin
- TV announcers (FS1): Aaron Goldsmith, Brady Quinn

Game information

First quarter

- CAL – Dario Longhetto 31-yard field goal, 11:12. California 3–0. Drive: 6 plays, 3 yards, 2:38.
- UCLA – Dorian Thompson-Robinson 2-yard run (Nicholas Barr-Mira kick), 0:58. UCLA 7–3. Drive: 15 plays, 88 yards, 6:20.

Second quarter

- UCLA – Charles Njoku 27-yard pass from Dorian Thompson-Robinson (Nicholas Barr-Mira kick), 11:45. UCLA 14–3. Drive: 9 plays, 71 yards, 3:04.
- CAL – Chase Garbers 8-yard run (Dario Longhetto kick), 7:10. UCLA 14–10. Drive: 12 plays, 75 yards, 4:35.
- UCLA – Chase Cota 6-yard pass from Dorian Thompson-Robinson (kick failed), 5:49. UCLA 20–10. Drive: 5 plays, 67 yards, 1:14.
- UCLA – Kyle Philips 5-yard pass from Dorian Thompson-Robinson (Nicholas Barr-Mira kick), 1:17. UCLA 27–10. Drive: 3 plays, 13 yards, 1:22.

Third quarter

- No scoring plays.

Fourth quarter

- UCLA – Brittain Brown 31-yard run (Nicholas Barr-Mira kick), 10:12. UCLA 34–10. Drive: 8 plays, 78 yards, 4:15.

Top passers

- CAL – Chase Garbers – 18/33, 122 yards, INT
- UCLA – Dorian Thompson-Robinson – 14/26, 196 yards, 3 TD, INT

Top rushers

- CAL – Christopher Brown Jr. – 8 rushes, 25 yards
- UCLA – Demetric Felton – 25 rushes, 107 yards

Top receivers

- CAL – Collin Moore – 2 receptions, 28 yards
- UCLA – Greg Dulcich – 3 receptions, 80 yards

=== At Oregon ===
UCLA Bruins at Oregon Ducks

Quarter	1	2	3	4	Total
Bruins	7	14	7	7	35
No. 11 Ducks	14	10	14	0	38

at Autzen Stadium, Eugene, Oregon

- Date: November 21, 2020
- Game time: 12:30 p.m., PT
- Game weather: 37 °F (3 °C), Overcast, Wind NW 2 MPH,
- Referee: Mark Duddy
- TV announcers (ESPN2): Jason Benetti, Andre Ware, Taylor McGregor

Game information

First quarter

- ORE – Devon Williams 19-yard pass from Tyler Shough (Camden Lewis kick), 5:39. Oregon 7–0. Drive: 1 play, 19 yards, 0:15.
- ORE – Travis Dye 32-yard pass from Tyler Shough (Camden Lewis kick), 5:23. Oregon 14–0. Drive: 1 play, 27 yards, 0:08.
- UCLA – Demetric Felton 1-yard run (Nicholas Barr-Mira kick), 2:15. Oregon 14–7. Drive: 6 plays, 52 yards, 3:08.

Second quarter

- UCLA – Qwuantrezz Knight 20-yard fumble return (Nicholas Barr-Mira kick), 13:21. Tied 14–14.
- ORE – Camden Lewis 23-yard field goal, 7:14. Oregon 17–14. Drive: 13 plays, 70 yards, 6:07.
- UCLA – Greg Dulcich 32-yard pass from Chase Griffin (Nicholas Barr-Mira kick), 3:24. UCLA 21–17. Drive: 10 plays, 69 yards, 3:50.
- ORE – Jordan Happle 58-yard interception return (Camden Lewis kick), 0:00. Oregon 24–21.

Third quarter

- ORE – C. J. Verdell 4-yard run (Camden Lewis kick), 11:48. Oregon 31–21. Drive: 7 plays, 75 yards, 3:12.
- UCLA – Brittain Brown 2-yard run (Nicholas Barr-Mira kick), 7:39. Oregon 31–28. Drive: 13 plays, 75 yards, 4:09.
- ORE – Hunter Kampmoyer 12-yard pass from Tyler Shough (Camden Lewis kick), 1:24. Oregon 38–28. Drive: 5 plays, 78 yards, 2:19.

Fourth quarter

- UCLA – Demetric Felton 11-yard run (Nicholas Barr-Mira kick), 3:43. Oregon 38–35. Drive: 12 plays, 90 yards, 3:33.

Top passers

- UCLA – Chase Griffin – 19/31, 195 yards, TD, 2 INT
- ORE – Tyler Shough – 19/30, 334 yards, 3 TD

Top rushers

- UCLA – Demetric Felton – 34 rushes, 167 yards, 2 TD
- ORE – Travis Dye – 10 rushes, 40 yards

Top receivers

- UCLA – Kyle Philips – 8 receptions, 91 yards
- ORE – Devon Williams – 6 receptions, 123 yards, TD

=== Arizona ===
UCLA Bruins vs. Arizona Wildcats

Quarter	1	2	3	4	Total
Wildcats	7	0	3	0	10
Bruins	3	17	0	7	27

at Rose Bowl, Pasadena, California

- Date: November 28, 2020
- Game time: 5:05 p.m. PST
- Game weather: 64 °F (18 °C), Clear, Wind 4 MPH
- Game attendance: 0
- Referee: Mike McCabe
- TV announcers (FOX): Aaron Goldsmith, Brady Quinn

Game information

1st quarter

- Arizona (10:05) – #6 Michael Wiley runs for a 3 yard TD (#43 Lucas Havrisik kick) – Arizona 7–0 Drive 4 Plays, 22 yards 1:24
- UCLA (5:34) – #2 Nicholas Barr-Mira kicks a 31 yard field goal – Arizona 7–3 Drive 10 Plays, 62 yards, 4:31

2nd quarter

- UCLA (11:58) – #11 Chase Griffin to #28 Brittain Brown for a 16 yard pass TD (#2 Nicholas Barr-Mira kick) – UCLA 10–7 Drive 9 Plays, 52 yards, 2:50
- UCLA (8:23) – #10 Demetric Felton runs for a 1 yard TD (#2 Nicholas Barr-Mira kick) – UCLA 17–7 Drive 6 Plays, 43 yards, 2:09
- UCLA (0:10) – #2 Nicholas Barr-Mira kicks a 30 yard field goal – UCLA 20–7 Drive 13 Plays, 81 yards, 4:11

3rd quarter

- Arizona (1:15) – #43 Lucas Havrisik kicks a 26 yard field goal – UCLA 20–10 Drive 11 Plays, 65 yards, 3:16

4th quarter

- UCLA (1:38) – #28 Brittain Brown runs for a 2 yard TD (#2 Nicholas Barr-Mira kick) – UCLA 27–10 Drive 5 Plays, 30 yards, 1:44

Passing leaders

- Arizona – Will Plummer – 17/35, 151 yards, 2 INT
- UCLA – Chase Griffin – 12/20, 129 yards, 1 TD

Rushing leaders

- Arizona – Gary Brightwell – 15 rushes, 57 yards
- UCLA – Demetric Felton – 32 rushes, 206 yards, 1 TD

Receiving leaders

- Arizona – Stanley Berryhill – 5 receptions, 58 yards
- UCLA – Kyle Philips – 3 receptions, 40 yards

=== Arizona State ===
UCLA Bruins at Arizona State Sun Devils

Quarter	1	2	3	4	Total
Bruins	0	17	0	8	25
Sun Devils	0	3	9	6	18

at Sun Devil Stadium, Tempe, Arizona

- Date: December 5, 2020
- Game time: 7:35 p.m. PST
- Referee: Chris Coyte
- TV announcers (FS1): Aaron Goldsmith, Brady Quinn

Game information

First quarter

- No scoring plays.

Second quarter

- UCLA – Delon Hurt 9-yard pass from Dorian Thompson-Robinson (Nicholas Barr-Mira kick), 13:17. UCLA 7–0. Drive: 9 plays, 73 yards, 3:31.
- UCLA – Nicholas Barr-Mira 44-yard field goal, 5:30. UCLA 10–0. Drive: 7 plays, 66 yards, 3:41.
- UCLA – Dorian Thompson-Robinson 11-yard run (Nicholas Barr-Mira kick), 0:30. UCLA 17–0. Drive: 8 plays, 91 yards, 2:27.
- ASU – Jack Luckhurst 49-yard field goal, 0:00. UCLA 17–3. Drive: 4 plays, 10 yards, 0:22.

Third quarter

- ASU – Frank Darby 10-yard pass from Jayden Daniels (Jack Luckhurst kick), 11:09. UCLA 17–10. Drive: 4 plays, 68 yards, 1:47.
- ASU – UCLA safety, 4:16. UCLA 17–12. Drive: 3 plays, −3 yards, 1:06.

Fourth quarter

- ASU – Jayden Daniels 1-yard run, 4:26. ASU 18–17. Drive: 11 plays, 82 yards, 6:04.
- UCLA – Demetric Felton 2-yard run (Chase Cota pass from Dorian Thompson-Robinson for two-point conversion), 1:09. UCLA 25–18. Drive: 11 plays, 75 yards, 3:17.

Top passers

- UCLA – Dorian Thompson-Robinson – 18/24, 192 yards, TD
- ASU – Jayden Daniels – 21/35, 225 yards, TD, INT

Top rushers

- UCLA – Brittain Brown – 7 rushes, 94 yards
- ASU – DeaMonte Trayanum – 15 rushes, 108 yards

Top receivers

- UCLA – Delon Hurt – 4 receptions, 62 yards, TD
- ASU – Rachaad White – 3 receptions, 53 yards

=== USC ===
UCLA Bruins vs. USC Trojans

Quarter	1	2	3	4	Total
No. 15 Trojans	0	10	13	20	43
Bruins	7	14	14	3	38

at Rose Bowl, Pasadena, California

- Date: December 12, 2020
- Game time: 4:44 p.m. PST
- Game weather: 62 °F (17 °C), Clear, Wind 13 MPH
- Game attendance: 0
- Referee: Mark Duddy
- TV announcers (ABC): Dave Pasch, Greg McElroy, Holly Rowe

Game information

First quarter

- UCLA – Ethan Fernea 33-yard pass from Dorian Thompson-Robinson (Nicholas Barr-Mira kick), 3:05. UCLA 7–0. Drive: 10 plays, 85 yards, 4:13.

Second quarter

- UCLA – Demetric Felton 21-yard pass from Dorian Thompson-Robinson (Nicholas Barr-Mira kick), 8:41. UCLA 14–0. Drive: 6 plays, 61 yards, 2:12.
- USC – Drake London 65-yard pass from Kedon Slovis (Parker Lewis kick), 7:34. UCLA 14–7. Drive: 3 plays, 75 yards, 1:07.
- USC – Parker Lewis 42-yard field goal, 3:26. UCLA 14–10. Drive: 7 plays, 3 yards, 3:29.
- UCLA – Demetric Felton 12-yard pass from Dorian Thompson-Robinson (Nicholas Barr-Mira kick), 0:20. UCLA 21–10. Drive: 11 plays, 75 yards, 3:06.

Third quarter

- UCLA – Brittain Brown 15-yard run (Nicholas Barr-Mira kick), 12:28. UCLA 28–10. Drive: 7 plays, 75 yards, 2:32.
- USC – Tyler Vaughns 38-yard pass from Kedon Slovis (Parker Lewis kick), 10:25. UCLA 28–17. Drive: 7 plays, 75 yards, 2:03.
- USC – Amon-Ra St. Brown 3-yard pass from Kedon Slovis (2pt miss), 4:00. UCLA 28–23. Drive: 10 plays, 31 yards, 4:03.
- UCLA – Greg Dulcich 69-yard pass from Dorian Thompson-Robinson (Nicholas Barr-Mira kick), 1:16. UCLA 35–23. Drive: 1 play, 69 yards, 0:09.

Fourth quarter

- USC – Vavae Malepeai 10-yard run (Parker Lewis kick), 11:40. UCLA 35–30. Drive: 11 plays, 75 yards, 4:36.
- USC – Drake London 9-yard pass from Kedon Slovis (2pt miss), 8:09. USC 36–35. Drive: 6 plays, 30 yards, 2:10.
- UCLA – Nicholas Barr-Mira 43-yard field goal, 0:52. UCLA 38–36. Drive: 7 plays, 51 yards, 2:09.
- USC – Amon-Ra St. Brown 8-yard pass from Kedon Slovis (Parker Lewis kick), 0:16. USC 43–38. Drive: 2 plays, 43 yards, 0:27.

Top passers

- USC – Kedon Slovis – 30/47, 344 yards, 5 TD, 2 INT
- UCLA – Dorian Thompson-Robinson – 30/36, 364 yards, 4 TD, 2 INT

Top rushers

- USC – Vavae Malepeai – 19 rushes, 110 yards, 1 TD
- UCLA – Demetric Felton – 21 rushes, 90 yards

Top receivers

- USC – Tyler Vaughns – 8 receptions, 128 yards, 1 TD
- UCLA – Greg Dulcich – 8 receptions, 167 yards, 1 TD

=== Stanford ===
UCLA Bruins vs. Stanford Cardinal

Quarter	1	2	3	4	OT	2OT	Total
Cardinal	7	13	0	14	7	7	48
Bruins	3	0	14	17	7	6	47

at Rose Bowl, Pasadena, California

- Date: December 19, 2020
- Game time: 4:05 p.m. PST
- Game weather: 68 °F (20 °C), Clear, Wind 5 MPH
- Game attendance: 0
- Referee: Michael Mothershed
- TV announcers (ESPN): Beth Mowins, Kirk Morrison, Taylor McGregor

Game information

First quarter

- STAN – Austin Jones 1-yard run (Jet Toner kick), 7:02. Stanford 7–0. Drive: 7 plays, 61 yards, 3:54.
- UCLA – Nicholas Barr-Mira 31-yard field goal, 1:21. Stanford 7–3. Drive: 13 plays, 62 yards, 5:41.

Second quarter

- STAN – Isaiah Sanders 2-yard run (kick failed), 13:42. Stanford 13–3. Drive: 6 plays, 75 yards, 2:39.
- STAN – Austin Jones 1-yard run (Jet Toner kick), 0:16. Stanford 20–3. Drive: 8 plays, 80 yards, 1:45.

Third quarter

- UCLA – Keegan Jones 9-yard run (Nicholas Barr-Mira kick), 9:10. Stanford 20–10. Drive: 6 plays, 67 yards, 2:41.
- UCLA – Greg Dulcich 17-yard pass from Chase Griffin (Nicholas Barr-Mira kick), 3:07. Stanford 20–17. Drive: 9 plays, 60 yards, 4:12.

Fourth quarter

- UCLA – Chase Cota 23-yard pass from Chase Griffin (Nicholas Barr-Mira kick), 14:54. UCLA 24–20. Drive: 4 plays, 84 yards, 1:25.
- UCLA – Nicholas Barr-Mira 31-yard field goal, 6:28. UCLA 27–20. Drive: 10 plays, 46 yards, 4:30.
- UCLA – Jay Shaw 39-yard interception return (Nicholas Barr-Mira kick), 5:39. UCLA 34–20.
- STAN – Simi Fehoko 11-yard pass from Davis Mills (Jet Toner kick), 2:34. UCLA 34–27. Drive: 11 plays, 75 yards, 3:05.
- STAN – Simi Fehoko 21-yard pass from Davis Mills (Jet Toner kick), 0:18. Tied 34–34. Drive: 9 plays, 72 yards, 1:20.

First Overtime

- UCLA – Greg Dulcich 21-yard pass from Chase Griffin (Nicholas Barr-Mira kick). UCLA 41–34. Drive: 2 plays, 25 yards.
- STAN – Isaiah Sanders 3-yard run (Jet Toner kick). Tied 41–41. Drive: 7 plays, 25 yards.

Second Overtime

- STAN – Simi Fehoko 14-yard pass from Davis Mills (Jet Toner kick). Stanford 48–41. Drive: 3 plays, 25 yards.
- UCLA – Kyle Philips 21-yard pass from Chase Griffin (2pt miss). Stanford 48–47. Drive: 7 plays, 25 yards.

Top passers

- Stanford – Davis Mills – 32/47, 428 yards, 3 TD, 3 INT
- UCLA – Chase Griffin – 9/11, 127 yards, 4 TD

Top rushers

- Stanford – Austin Jones – 23 rushes, 92 yards, 2 TD
- UCLA – Brittain Brown – 29 rushes, 219 yards

Top receivers

- Stanford – Simi Fehoko – 16 receptions, 230 yards, 3 TD
- UCLA – Kyle Philips – 7 receptions, 61 yards, 1 TD

== Rankings ==
On December 6, UCLA received a vote in the AP Poll for the first time since 2017.

Ranking movements Legend: ██ Increase in ranking ██ Decrease in ranking — = Not ranked RV = Received votes
	Week																	
Poll	Pre	1	2	3	4	5	6	7	8	9	10	11	12	13	14	15	16	Final
AP	—	—	—	—	—	—	—	—	—	—	—	—	—	—	RV			
Coaches	—	—	—	—	—	—	—	—	—	—	—	—	—	—	—			
CFP	Not released												—	—				Not released

== Players drafted into the NFL ==
Round	Pick	Player	Position	NFL Club
3	75	Osa Odighizuwa	DT	Dallas Cowboys
6	211	Demetric Felton	RB	Cleveland Browns

== Statistics ==
Statistics	UCLA	OPP
First downs	172	154
Plays–yards	519–3185	527–2869
Rushes–yards	319–1614	264–950
Passing yards	1571	1919
Passing: comp–att–int	130–200–6	161–263–9
Turnovers		
Time of possession	28:52	31:08

== Awards and honors ==
- Associated Press 2020 All-Conference Team – Osa Odighizuwa (defensive tackle) and Demetric Felton (all-purpose), first team; Greg Dulcich (tight end), Caleb Johnson (linebacker), Felton (running back) second team
- Pac–12 2020 All-Conference Team – Osa Odighizuwa (first team); Greg Dulcich, Demetric Felton and Dorian Thompson-Robinson (second-team); Stephan Blaylock, Caleb Johnson, Qwuantrezz Knight, Sam Marrazzo and Kyle Philips (honorable mention)
