= Caleb Johnson (linebacker, born July 14, 1998) =

American football player

No. 40
- Position: Linebacker

Personal information
- Born: July 14, 1998 (age 28)
- Listed height: 5 ft 11 in (1.80 m)
- Listed weight: 228 lb (103 kg)

Career information
- High school: Vista Murrieta (Murrieta, California)
- College: Fullerton (2016–2018); Texas (2019); UCLA (2020–2021); Miami (FL) (2022)
- NFL draft: 2023: undrafted

Career history
- New York Jets (2023)*; Pittsburgh Steelers (2023)*; Arizona Cardinals (2023)*; Cleveland Browns (2024)*; Arlington Renegades (2025); Montreal Alouettes (2025)
- * Offseason or practice squad member only

Caleb Johnson (born July 14, 1998) is an American former professional football linebacker. He played college football at Fullerton, Texas, UCLA, and Miami.

== Early life ==
Caleb Johnson was born on July 14, 1998. He played high school football at Vista Murrieta High School in Murrieta, California. He recorded 120 tackles and six sacks as a senior in 2015. Johnson received an offer to play college football for the Wyoming Cowboys but Wyoming rescinded after Johnson did not meet the academic requirements.

== College career ==
Johnson committed to Fullerton College but missed the 2016 season as a grayshirt while recovering from a groin injury. He helped Fullerton win the California Community College Athletic Association title in 2017, playing in 13 games while posting 29 solo tackles, 12 assisted tackles, 5.5 sacks, one forced fumble, and one fumble recovery. Johnson missed the 2018 season due to a shoulder injury.

In the class of 2019, Johnson was rated the No. 2 junior college inside linebacker by 247Sports.com and the No. 4 junior college outside linebacker by ESPN.com. On July 7, 2018, he committed to play for the Iowa State Cyclones beginning in 2019. However, he decomitted on October 9, 2018. He signed a national letter of intent with the Texas Longhorns on December 19, 2018. He played in three games for the Longhorns during the 2019 season before entering the NCAA transfer portal on September 17, 2019. His reasons for transferring included reinjuring his shoulder and a poor relationship with the coaching staff.

On October 2, 2019, Johnson committed to the University of California, Los Angeles to play for the UCLA Bruins beginning in 2020. He signed his national letter of intent with UCLA on December 18, 2019. He had been working as a bouncer prior to signing with UCLA. Johnson started all seven games at inside linebacker during the COVID-19 shortended 2020 season, totaling 22 solo tackles, 22 assisted tackles, 5.5 sacks, one fumble recovery, and one interception. He led the team in both tackles and sacks, earning honorable mention All-Pac-12 honors. He was also named to the 2020–21 Pac-12 Fall Academic Honor Roll. He appeared in 11 games, starting ten at inside linebacker, in 2021, recording 28 solo tackles, 17 assisted tackles, one interception, and three pass breakups. Johnson graduated from UCLA with a degree in African-American studies.

In April 2022, Johnson transferred to the University of Miami to play his final season of college football eligibility for the Miami Hurricanes. He played in all 12 games, starting four, during the 2022 season, posting 26 solo tackles, 22 assisted tackles, 1.5 sacks, and two forced fumbles.

== Professional career ==
Pre-draft measurables
Height	Weight	Arm length	Hand span	Wingspan	40-yard dash	10-yard split	20-yard split	20-yard shuttle	Three-cone drill	Vertical jump	Broad jump	Bench press
5 ft 11 3/8 in (1.81 m)	228 lb (103 kg)	31 5/8 in (0.80 m)	9 1/4 in (0.23 m)	6 ft 5 1/4 in (1.96 m)	4.40 s	1.61 s	2.59 s	4.35 s	7.40 s	32.0 in (0.81 m)	10 ft 6 in (3.20 m)	25 reps
All values from Miami's Pro Day

After going undrafted in the 2023 NFL draft, he signed with the New York Jets on May 5, 2023. He played in all four preseason games for the Jets, posting five solo tackles and eight assisted tackles. Johnson was waived on August 29 and signed to the team's practice squad the next day. He was released on September 12, 2023.

Johnson was signed to the practice squad of the Pittsburgh Steelers on October 24, 2023. He was released shortly after on October 30, 2023.

Johnson was signed to the Arizona Cardinals' practice squad on December 27, 2023. He was released on January 2, 2024.

Johnson signed a futures contract with the Cleveland Browns on January 17, 2024. He was waived on July 24 and re-signed on August 1. He then played in all three preseason games for the Browns in 2024, recording eight solo tackles and six assisted tackles, before being waived on August 26, 2024.

In November 2024, Johnson signed with the Arlington Renegades of the United Football League (UFL) for the 2025 UFL season. He played in all ten regular season games, starting two, for the Renegades in 2025, posting 19 tackles and one sack.

Johnson was signed to the practice roster of the Montreal Alouettes of the Canadian Football League on August 5, 2025. He was promoted to the active roster on October 11, and dressed in one game for Montreal. He was placed on the one-game injured list on October 16, 2025. On March 31, 2026, Johnson was listed as being transferred to the status of retired.
