= Kyle Philips =

American football player (born 1999)

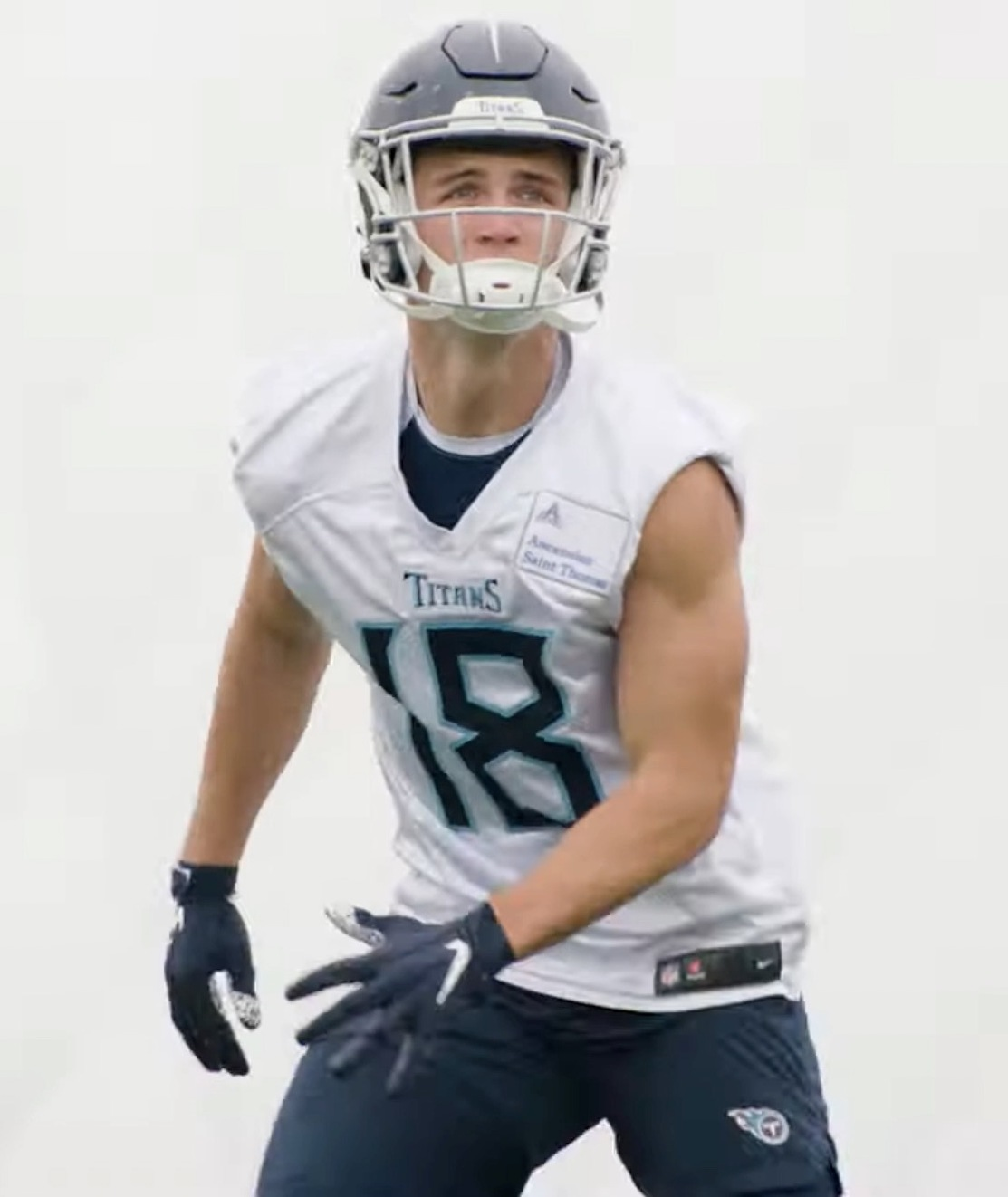
- Philips with the Tennessee Titans in 2022

Profile
- Position: Wide receiver

Personal information
- Born: June 17, 1999 (age 27); Las Vegas, Nevada, U.S.
- Listed height: 5 ft 11 in (1.80 m)
- Listed weight: 189 lb (86 kg)

Career information
- High school: San Marcos (San Marcos, California)
- College: UCLA (2018–2021)
- NFL draft: 2022: 5th round, 163rd overall pick

Career history
- Tennessee Titans (2022–2023); Philadelphia Eagles (2024)*; Las Vegas Raiders (2025)*
- * Offseason or practice squad member only

Awards and highlights
- Super Bowl champion (LIX); First-team All-Pac-12 (2021)

Career NFL statistics as of 2024
- Receptions: 23
- Receiving yards: 259
- Return yards: 98
- Stats at Pro Football Reference

Kyle Michael Philips (born June 17, 1999) is an American professional football wide receiver. He played college football for the UCLA Bruins and was a first-team all-conference selection in the Pac-12 in 2021. Philips was drafted by the Tennessee Titans in the fifth round of the 2022 NFL draft.

== Early life ==
Philips grew up in San Marcos, California, and attended San Marcos High School. As a junior, he had 65 receptions for 909 yards and eleven touchdowns. In his senior year, Philips caught 59 passes for 1,318 yards and 10 touchdowns. He also made 59 tackles on defense in his high school career.

Philips was ranked as a four-star recruit by ESPN and listed as the No. 31 recruit in California. He was recruited by Jimmie Dougherty, who was the receivers coach for UCLA at the time. He signed his National Letter of Intent on December 20, 2017, becoming the first official signing for their new head coach, Chip Kelly.

== College career ==
As a freshman at the University of California, Los Angeles, Philips played in three of the first four games of the 2018 season before suffering a concussion and opting to redshirt. He led the team in 2019 with 60 catches, 681 receiving yards and five touchdown receptions.

In 2021, he was named to the preseason watch list for the Paul Hornung Award, awarded to the most versatile player in the nation. He also received preseason All-Pac-12 first-team honors. Philips had seven catches for 113 yards, including scores of 42 and 15 yards, in a loss to Fresno State. The two touchdown catches tied his career high with the other occurring in 2019 against the Stanford Cardinal. At the game against Colorado on November 13, 2021, Philips caught a team-high eight passes and returned a punt 82 yards for a touchdown, his second career punt return for a score. For the season, he was named first-team All-Pac-12 as a receiver and garnered second-team honors as a return specialist. Philips led the conference with 10 receiving touchdowns and was second in receiving yards per game with 67.2. He also averaged 22.6 yards per punt return, which led the conference among players with more than one return.

After the season, Philips declared for the 2022 NFL draft. He ended his career ranked fourth in UCLA history with 163 career receptions.

== Professional career ==
Pre-draft measurables
Height	Weight	Arm length	Hand span	Wingspan	40-yard dash	10-yard split	20-yard split	20-yard shuttle	Three-cone drill	Vertical jump	Broad jump
5 ft 11 1/4 in (1.81 m)	189 lb (86 kg)	29 5/8 in (0.75 m)	8 5/8 in (0.22 m)	5 ft 11 in (1.80 m)	4.58 s	1.55 s	2.57 s	4.09 s	6.75 s	33.5 in (0.85 m)	10 ft 4 in (3.15 m)
All values from NFL Combine/Pro Day

=== Tennessee Titans ===
Philips was drafted by the Tennessee Titans in the fifth round, 163rd overall, in the 2022 NFL draft. In the 2022 season opener against the New York Giants, he led all Titans receivers with six receptions for 66 yards. He also had a 46-yard punt return to set up Tennessee's first touchdown. However, he also lost a fumble on a return. In Week 2, he lost another fumble on a punt return against the Buffalo Bills. Philips later suffered a hamstring injury in practice and was placed on injured reserve on October 25, 2022.

On August 31, 2023, Phillips was placed on injured reserve. He was activated on October 7, 2023. He was released on August 27, 2024, with injury designation.

=== Philadelphia Eagles ===
On September 4, 2024, Philips was signed to the Philadelphia Eagles practice squad. He won his first Super Bowl ring when the Eagles defeated the Kansas City Chiefs 40–22 in Super Bowl LIX.

=== Las Vegas Raiders ===
On February 18, 2025, Philips signed with the Las Vegas Raiders. He was released on August 3.

== Career statistics ==
=== NFL ===
Year	Team	Games		Receiving				
Year	Team	GP	GS	Rec	Yds	Avg	Lng	TD
2022	TEN	4	0	8	78	9.8	21	0
2023	TEN	9	0	15	181	12.1	29	0
Career		13	0	23	259	11.3	29	0

=== College ===
Season	Team	GP	Receiving		
Season	Team	GP	Rec	Yds	TD
2018	UCLA	4	6	31	0
2019	UCLA	11	60	681	5
2020	UCLA	7	38	370	2
2021	UCLA	11	59	739	10
Career		33	163	1,821	17
