= 2021 Pac-12 Conference football season =

American college football season

- League: NCAA Division I Football Bowl Subdivision
- Sport: Football
- Duration: August 28, 2021 – January 1, 2022
- Teams: 12
- TV partner(s): Fox Sports Media Group, (Fox, FS1), ESPN Family (ABC, ESPN, ESPN2, ESPNU) and Pac-12 Networks

2022 NFL Draft
- Top draft pick: DE Kayvon Thibodeaux, Oregon
- Picked by: New York Giants, 5th overall

Regular season
- Season MVP: Drake London, WR, USC
- Top scorer: Tavion Thomas, RB, Utah (120 points)
- North champions: Oregon
- North runners-up: Washington State
- South champions: Utah
- South runners-up: Arizona State; UCLA

Pac-12 Championship
- Champions: Utah
- Runners-up: Oregon
- Finals MVP: Devin Lloyd, Utah

Football seasons
- 2020 2022

2021 Pac-12 Conference football standings
	Conf.			Overall
Team	W		L	W		L
North Division
No. 22 Oregon xy	7	–	2	10	–	4
Washington State	6	–	3	7	–	6
Oregon State	5	–	4	7	–	6
California	4	–	5	5	–	7
Washington	3	–	6	4	–	8
Stanford	2	–	7	3	–	9
South Division
No. 12 Utah xy$	8	–	1	10	–	4
UCLA	6	–	3	8	–	4
Arizona State†	0	–	3	0	–	5
USC	3	–	6	4	–	8
Colorado	3	–	6	4	–	8
Arizona	1	–	8	1	–	11
Championship: Utah 38, Oregon 10
$ – Conference champion; x – Division champion/co-champions; y – Championship game participant; Rankings from AP Poll

The 2021 Pac-12 Conference football season was the 43rd season of Pac-12 football taking place during the 2021 NCAA Division I FBS football season. The season began on August 28, 2021, and ended with the 2021 Pac-12 Championship Game on December 3, 2021, at Allegiant Stadium in Paradise, Nevada.

The Pac-12 was a Power Five conference under the College Football Playoff format along with the Atlantic Coast Conference, the Big 12 Conference, Big Ten Conference, and the Southeastern Conference. The 2021 season was the eleventh for the twelve Pac-12 teams to be divided into two divisions of six teams each, named North and South.

== Preseason ==
2021 Pac-12 Spring Football and number of signees on signing day:

North Division

- California – 21
- Oregon – 23
- Oregon State – 15
- Stanford – 17
- Washington – 16
- Washington State – 23

South Division

- Arizona – 26
- Arizona State – 17
- Colorado – 19
- UCLA – 17
- USC – 26
- Utah – 22

=== Recruiting classes ===
Rankings
Team	ESPN	Rivals	Scout & 24/7	Signees
Arizona	–	65	78	26
Arizona State	25	64	52	17
California	21	41	28	21
Colorado	–	62	64	19
Oregon	8	3	6	23
Oregon State	–	NR	109	15
Stanford	–	47	41	17
UCLA	–	33	31	17
USC	10	8	7	26
Utah	–	28	33	22
Washington	–	37	36	16
Washington State	–	50	61	23

=== Pac-12 Media Days ===
The Pac-12 conducted its 2021 Pac-12 media days at the Loews Hollywood Hotel, in Hollywood, California, on July 27, 2021 (Pac-12 Network).

The teams and representatives in respective order were as follows:

- Pac-12 Commissioner – George Kliavkoff
- Arizona – Jedd Fisch (HC), Stanley Berryhill (WR), Anthony Pandy (LB)
- Arizona State – Herm Edwards (HC), Jayden Daniels (QB), Chase Lucas (DB)
- California – Justin Wilcox (HC), Chase Garbers (QB), Kuony Deng (LB)
- Colorado – Karl Dorrell (HC), Dimitri Stanley (WR), Nate Landman (LB)
- Oregon – Mario Cristobal (HC), Alex Forsyth (OL), Kayvon Thibodeaux (DE)
- Oregon State – Jonathan Smith (HC), Avery Roberts (LB), Jaydon Grant (DB)
- Stanford – David Shaw (HC), MIchael Wilson (WR), Thomas Booker (DE)
- UCLA – Chip Kelly (HC), Dorian Thompson-Robinson (QB), Qwuantrezz Knight (DB)
- USC – Clay Helton (HC), Kedon Slovis (QB), Drake London (WR)
- Utah – Kyle Whittingham (HC), Britain Covey (WR), Devin Lloyd (LB)
- Washington – Jimmy Lake (HC), Jaxson Kirkland (OL), Trent McDuffie (DB)
- Washington State – Nick Rolovich (HC)†, Max Borghi (RB), Jahad Woods (LB)

† Washington State Head Coach Nick Rolovich did not attend the conference, and instead participated remotely.

==== Preseason Media polls ====
The preseason polls were released on July 27, 2021. Since 1992, the credentialed media has gotten the preseason champion correct just five times. Only nine times has the preseason pick even made it to the Pac-12 title game. Below are the results of the media poll with total points received next to each school and first-place votes in parentheses. For the 2021 poll, Oregon was voted as the favorite to win both the North Division, as well as the Pac–12 Championship and USC was voted as the favorite to win the South Division.

North
Predicted finish	Team	Votes (1st place)
1	Oregon	238(38)
2	Washington	138(2)
3	California	140
4	Stanford	137
5	Oregon State	71
6	Washington State	65

South
Predicted finish	Team	Votes (1st place)
1	USC	223(27)
2	Utah	183(6)
3	Arizona State	170(6)
4	UCLA	135(1)
5	Colorado	88
6	Arizona	41

Media poll (Pac-12 Championship)
Rank	Team	Votes
1	Oregon	27
2	USC	10
3	Utah	3

=== Preseason awards ===
==== All−American Teams ====
	AP 1st Team	AP 2nd Team	WCFF 1st Team	WCFF 2nd Team	TSN 1st Team	TSN 2nd Team	ESPN	CBS 1st Team	CBS 2nd Team	CFN 1st Team	CFN 2nd Team	CFN HM	PFF 1st Team	PFF 3rd Team	PFF HM
Thomas Booker, Stanford, DE												✓			
Max Borghi, Washington State, RB															✓
Jarek Broussard, Colorado, RB												✓			
Jayden Daniels, Arizona State, QB												✓			
Greg Dulcich, UCLA, TE												✓			
Nathan Eldridge, Oregon State, C												✓			
Nick Ford, Utah, C											✓				
Paul Grattan, UCLA, G												✓			
Ben Griffiths, USC, P												✓			
Drake Jackson, USC, DE										✓					
Jaxson Kirkland, Washington, OL				✓					✓						
Brant Kuithe, Utah, TE															✓
Sataoa Laumea, Utah, G												✓			
Devin Lloyd, Utah, LB		✓		✓	✓		✓					✓			
Jermayne Lole, Arizona State, DT													✓		
Drake London, USC, WR												✓			
Abraham Lucas, Washington State, T												✓			
Trent McDuffie, Washington, S												✓		✓	
Cade Otton, Washington, TE												✓			
Isaiah Pola-Mao, USC, S												✓			
Noah Sewell, Oregon, LB										✓					
Kedon Slovis, USC, QB												✓			
Chris Steele, USC, CB											✓				
Kayvon Thibodeaux, Oregon, DE	✓		✓		✓		✓	✓		✓			✓		
Zion Tupuola-Fetui, Washington, DE												✓			
Edefuan Ulofoshio, Washington, LB						✓							✓		
Dohnovan West, Arizona State, G												✓			✓
Mykael Wright, Oregon, CB												✓			

==== Individual awards ====
Award	Head coach/Player	School	Position	Link
Lott Trophy	Nate Landman	Colorado	LB	
Lott Trophy	Kayvon Thibodeaux	Oregon	DE	
Lott Trophy	Thomas Booker	Stanford	DE	
Lott Trophy	Quentin Lake	UCLA	DB	
Lott Trophy	Devin Lloyd	Utah	LB	
Lott Trophy	Edefuan Ulofoshio	Washington	LB	
Dodd Trophy	Jimmy Lake	Washington	HC	
Maxwell Award	Jayden Daniels	Arizona State	QB	
Maxwell Award	Austin Jones	Stanford	RB	
Maxwell Award	Dorian Thompson-Robinson	UCLA	QB	
Maxwell Award	Kedon Slovis	USC	QB	
Maxwell Award	Charlie Brewer	Utah	QB	
Bednarik Award	Chase Lucas	Arizona State	CB	
Bednarik Award	Cameron Goode	California	LB	
Bednarik Award	Nate Landman	Colorado	LB	
Bednarik Award	Kayvon Thibodeaux	Oregon	DE	
Bednarik Award	Avery Roberts	Oregon State	LB	
Bednarik Award	Drake Jackson	USC	DE	
Bednarik Award	Edefuan Ulofoshio	Washington	LB	
Bednarik Award	Trent McDuffie	Washington	CB	
Davey O'Brien Award	Charlie Brewer	Utah	QB	
Davey O'Brien Award	Jayden Daniels	Arizona State	QB	
Davey O'Brien Award	Kedon Slovis	USC	QB	
Davey O'Brien Award	Dorian Thompson-Robinson	UCLA	QB	
Doak Walker Award	Max Borghi	Washington State	RB	
Doak Walker Award	Jarek Broussard	Colorado	RB	
Doak Walker Award	Travis Dye	Oregon	RB	
Doak Walker Award	Alex Fontenot	Colorado	RB	
Doak Walker Award	Keaontay Ingram	USC	RB	
Doak Walker Award	Austin Jones	Stanford	RB	
Doak Walker Award	Vavae Malepeai	USC	RB	
Doak Walker Award	Sean McGew	Washington	RB	
Doak Walker Award	C. J. Verdell	Oregon	RB	
Doak Walker Award	Michael Wiley	Arizona	RB	
Fred Biletnikoff Award	Max Borghi	Washington State	RB	
Fred Biletnikoff Award	Johnny Johnson III	Oregon	WR	
Fred Biletnikoff Award	Tahj Washington	USC	WR	
Fred Biletnikoff Award	Michael Wilson	Stanford	WR	
John Mackey Award	Cade Otton	Washington	TE	
John Mackey Award	Greg Dulcich	UCLA	TE	
John Mackey Award	Benjamin Yurosek	Stanford	TE	
John Mackey Award	Jake Tonges	California	TE	
John Mackey Award	Teagan Quitoriano	Oregon State	TE	
John Mackey Award	Cole Fotheringham	Utah	TE	
John Mackey Award	Brady Russell	Colorado	TE	
Rimington Trophy	Josh McCauley	Arizona	OL	
Rimington Trophy	Dohnovan West	Arizona State	OL	
Rimington Trophy	Michael Saffell	California	OL	
Rimington Trophy	Alex Forsyth	Oregon	OL	
Rimington Trophy	Nathan Eldridge	Oregon State	OL	
Rimington Trophy	Luke Wattenberg	Washington	OL	
Rimington Trophy	Brian Greene	Washington State	OL	
Butkus Award	Drake Jackson	USC	LB	
Butkus Award	Nate Landman	Colorado	LB	
Butkus Award	Devin Lloyd	Utah	LB	
Butkus Award	Avery Roberts	Oregon State	LB	
Butkus Award	Merlin Robertson	Arizona State	LB	
Butkus Award	Noah Sewell	Oregon	LB	
Butkus Award	Zion Tupuola-Fetui	Washington	LB	
Butkus Award	Edefuan Ulofoshio	Washington	LB	
Outland Trophy	Henry Bainivalu	Washington	G	
Outland Trophy	Nathan Eldridge	Oregon State	C	
Outland Trophy	Alex Forsyth	Oregon	C	
Outland Trophy	Jaxson Kirkland	Washington	T	
Outland Trophy	Jermayne Lole	Arizona State	DT	
Outland Trophy	Abraham Lucas	Washington State	T	
Outland Trophy	Walter Rouse	Stanford	T	
Outland Trophy	Dohnovan West	Arizona State	T	
Bronko Nagurski Trophy	Thomas Booker	Stanford	DE	
Bronko Nagurski Trophy	Drake Jackson	USC	DE	
Bronko Nagurski Trophy	Tyler Johnson	Arizona State	DE	
Bronko Nagurski Trophy	Nate Landman	Colorado	LB	
Bronko Nagurski Trophy	Devin Lloyd	Utah	LB	
Bronko Nagurski Trophy	Trent McDuffie	Washington	CB	
Bronko Nagurski Trophy	Chris Steele	USC	CB	
Bronko Nagurski Trophy	Kayvon Thibodeaux	Oregon	DE	
Bronko Nagurski Trophy	Edefuan Ulofoshio	Washington	LB	
Lou Groza Award	Jadon Redding	Utah	PK	
Paul Hornung Award	Britain Covey	Utah	WR	
Paul Hornung Award	Travell Harris	Washington State	WR	
Paul Hornung Award	Kyle Philips	UCLA	WR	
Paul Hornung Award	Nikko Remigio	California	WR	
Wuerffel Trophy	Bryce Wolma	Arizona	TE	
Wuerffel Trophy	Jackson He	Arizona State	RB	
Wuerffel Trophy	Michael Saffell	California	OL	
Wuerffel Trophy	Nate Landman	Colorado	LB	
Wuerffel Trophy	Jaydon Grant	Oregon State	CB	
Wuerffel Trophy	Isaiah Sanders	Stanford	QB	
Wuerffel Trophy	Shea Pitts	UCLA	LB	
Wuerffel Trophy	Mo Hasan	USC	QB	
Wuerffel Trophy	Mika Tafua	Utah	DE	
Wuerffel Trophy	Race Porter	Washington	P	
Walter Camp Award	Jayden Daniels	Arizona State	QB	
Walter Camp Award	Kedon Slovis	USC	QB	
Walter Camp Award	Kayvon Thibodeaux	Oregon	DE	
Manning Award	Jayden Daniels	Arizona State	QB	
Manning Award	Chase Garbers	California	QB	
Manning Award	Kedon Slovis	USC	QB	
Earl Campbell Tyler Rose Award	Zeriah Beason	Oregon State	WR	
Earl Campbell Tyler Rose Award	Charlie Brewer	Utah	QB	
Earl Campbell Tyler Rose Award	Jarek Broussard	Colorado	RB	
Earl Campbell Tyler Rose Award	Victor Curne	Washington	OL	
Earl Campbell Tyler Rose Award	Kellen Diesch	Arizona State	OL	
Earl Campbell Tyler Rose Award	Alex Fontenot	Colorado	RB	
Earl Campbell Tyler Rose Award	Elijah Higgins	Stanford	WR	
Earl Campbell Tyler Rose Award	Keaontay Ingram	USC	RB	
Earl Campbell Tyler Rose Award	Brant Kuithe	Utah	TE	
Earl Campbell Tyler Rose Award	McKade Mettauer	California	OL	
Earl Campbell Tyler Rose Award	K.D. Nixon	USC	WR	
Earl Campbell Tyler Rose Award	Michael Wiley	Arizona	RB	
Ray Guy Award	Ben Griffiths	USC	P	
Ray Guy Award	Michael Turk‡	Arizona State	P	
Ray Guy Award	Race Porter	Washington	P	
Ray Guy Award	Ryan Sanborn	Stanford	P	
Polynesian College Football Player Of The Year Award	Donovan Laie	Arizona	OL	
Polynesian College Football Player Of The Year Award	Jermayne Lole	Arizona State	DL	
Polynesian College Football Player Of The Year Award	Merlin Robertson	Arizona State	LB	
Polynesian College Football Player Of The Year Award	Kekoa Crawford	California	WR	
Polynesian College Football Player Of The Year Award	Mo Iosefa	California	LB	
Polynesian College Football Player Of The Year Award	Malaesala Aumavae-Laulu	Oregon	OL	
Polynesian College Football Player Of The Year Award	Mase Funa	Oregon	DL	
Polynesian College Football Player Of The Year Award	Noah Sewell	Oregon	LB	
Polynesian College Football Player Of The Year Award	Popo Aumavae	Oregon	DL	
Polynesian College Football Player Of The Year Award	Isaiah Pola-Mao	USC	DB	
Polynesian College Football Player Of The Year Award	Kana'i Mauga	USC	LB	
Polynesian College Football Player Of The Year Award	Tuli Tuipulotu	USC	DL	
Polynesian College Football Player Of The Year Award	Mika Tafua	Utah	DL	
Polynesian College Football Player Of The Year Award	Nephi Sewell	Utah	LB	
Polynesian College Football Player Of The Year Award	Sataoa Laumea	Utah	OL	
Polynesian College Football Player Of The Year Award	Simi Moala	Utah	OL	
Polynesian College Football Player Of The Year Award	Tennessee Pututau	Utah	DL	
Polynesian College Football Player Of The Year Award	Viane Moala	Utah	DL	
Polynesian College Football Player Of The Year Award	Henry Bainivalu	Washington	OL	
Polynesian College Football Player Of The Year Award	Sam Taimani	Washington	DL	
Polynesian College Football Player Of The Year Award	Tuli Letuligsenoa	Washington	DL	
Polynesian College Football Player Of The Year Award	Ulumoo Ale	Washington	OL	
Polynesian College Football Player Of The Year Award	Zion Tupuola-Fetui	Washington	LB	
Johnny Unitas Golden Arm Award	Jayden Daniels	Arizona State	QB	
Johnny Unitas Golden Arm Award	Chase Garbers	California	QB	
Johnny Unitas Golden Arm Award	Anthony Brown	Oregon	QB	
Johnny Unitas Golden Arm Award	Dorian Thompson-Robinson	UCLA	QB	
Johnny Unitas Golden Arm Award	Kedon Slovis	USC	QB	
Johnny Unitas Golden Arm Award	Charlie Brewer	Utah	QB	
Johnny Unitas Golden Arm Award	Dylan Morris	Washington	QB	
Johnny Unitas Golden Arm Award	Jarrett Guarantano	Washington State	QB	

‡Arizona State's Michael Turk announced his intention to transfer after the media voting window ended.

==== Preseason All Pac-12 ====
First Team

Position	Player	Class	Team
First Team Offense
QB	Kedon Slovis	Jr.	USC
RB	Jarek Broussard	RSo.	Colorado
RB	Max Borghi	Jr.	Washington State
WR	Drake London	Jr.	USC (2)
WR	Kyle Philips	RJr.	UCLA
TE	Cade Otton	Jr.	Washington
OL	Jaxson Kirkland	Sr.	Washington (2)
OL	Abraham Lucas	RSr.	Washington State (2)
OL	Dohnovan West	Jr.	Arizona State
OL	Nick Ford	Jr.	Utah
OL	Alex Forsyth	Jr.	Oregon
First Team Defense
DL	Kayvon Thibodeaux	So.	Oregon (2)
DL	Mika Tafua	Jr.	Utah (2)
DL	Thomas Booker	Sr.	Stanford
DL	Jermayne Lole	Sr	Arizona State (2)
LB	Drake Jackson	Jr.	USC (3)
LB	Devin Lloyd	Jr.	Utah (3)
LB	Nate Landman	Sr.	Colorado (2)
DB	Mykael Wright	So.	Oregon (3)
DB	Trent McDuffie	So.	Washington (3)
DB	Chase Lucas	RSr.	Arizona State (3)
DB	Chris Steele	Jr.	USC (4)
First team special teams
PK	Jadon Redding	So.	Utah (4)
P	Michael Turk‡	RSr.	Arizona State (4)
AP	Thomas Booker	Sr.	Stanford (2)
RS	Britain Covey	Jr.	Utah (5)

†California's Michael Saffell announced his medical retirement after the media voting window ended.
‡Arizona State's Michael Turk announced his intention to transfer after the media voting window ended.

Second Team

Position	Player	Class	Team
Second Team Offense
QB	Jayden Daniels	Jr.	Arizona State (5)
RB	C. J. Verdell	Jr.	Oregon (4)
RB	Rachaad White	RSr.	Arizona State (6)
WR	Johnny Johnson III	Sr.	Oregon (5)
WR	Britain Covey	Jr.	Utah (6)
TE	Greg Dulcich	RJr.	UCLA (2)
OL	Nathan Eldridge	Sr.	Oregon State
OL	Sataoa Laumea	RFr.	Utah (7)
OL	Michael Saffell†	RSr.	California
OL	Kellen Diesch	GS	Arizona State (7)
OL	Sean Rhyan	Jr.	UCLA (3)
Second Team Defense
DL	Tyler Johnson	RJr.	Arizona State (8)
DL	Nick Figueroa	RSr.	USC (5)
DL	Tuli Tuipulotu	So.	USC (6)
DL	Terrance Lang	Jr.	Colorado (3)
LB	Noah Sewell	Fr.	Oregon (6)
LB	Edefuan Ulofoshio	So.	Washington (4)
LB	Avery Roberts	RJr.	Oregon State (2)
DB	Isaiah Pola-Mao	RSr.	USC (7)
DB	Mekhi Blackmon	Jr.	Colorado (4)
DB	Evan Fields	Sr	Arizona State (9)
DB	Verone McKinley III	So.	Oregon (7)
Second team special teams
PK	Lucas Havrisik	Sr.	Arizona
P	Ben Griffiths	RJr.	USC (8)
AP	D.J. Taylor	RFr.	Arizona State (10)
RS	D.J. Taylor	RFr.	Arizona State (11)

All Pac–12 Honorable Mention (received votes from four or more members of the media):

- Arizona:
- Arizona State: DeaMonte Trayanum (RB)
- California: Luc Bequette (DL), Kuony Deng (LB), Cameron Goode (LB), Elijah Hicks (DB), Josh Drayden (DB)
- Colorado: Dimitri Stanley (WR), Carson Wells (LB), Isaiah Lewis (DB)
- Oregon: Travis Dye (RB), Mycah Pittman (WR), T. J. Bass (OL),
- Oregon State: Joshua Gray (OL), Isaac Hodgins (DL)
- Stanford: Austin Jones (RB), Michael Wilson (WR), Walter Rouse (OL), Kyu Blu Kelly (DB), Ryan Sanborn (P)
- UCLA: Dorian Thompson-Robinson (QB), Brittain Brown (RB), Alec Anderson (OL), Sam Marrazzo (OL), Otito Ogbonnia (DL), Caleb Johnson (LB), Qwuantrezz Knight (DB), Quentin Lake (DB), Stephen Blaylock (DB), Nicholas Barr-Mira (PK)
- USC: K.D. Nixon (WR), Andrew Vorhees (OL), Parker Lewis (PK), Damon Johnson (AP/RS)
- Utah: Brant Kuithe (TE), Viane Moala (DL), JaTravis Broughton (DB), Clark Phillips III (DB), Keegan Markgraf (AP/RS)
- Washington: Luke Wattenberg (OL), Henry Bainivalu (OL), Kyler Gordon (DB), Peyton Henry (PK), Kyler Gordon (AP/RS)
- Washington State: Travell Harris (WR), Renard Bell (WR), Liam Ryan (OL), Brennan Jackson (DL), Jahad Woods (LB), Jaylen Watson (DB)

== Head coaches ==
=== Coaching changes ===
There was one coaching change before the 2021 season. On December 12, 2020, Kevin Sumlin was fired from Arizona after three seasons. Jedd Fisch was hired to serve as the new head coach on December 23, 2020. On September 13, 2021, Clay Helton was fired as head coach of USC. Donte Williams was named interim head coach. On October 18, 2021, Nick Rolovich was fired as head coach of Washington State. Jake Dickert was named interim coach. On November 14, 2021, Jimmy Lake was fired as head coach of Washington. Bob Gregory was named interim coach.

Washington State removed the interim head coaching tag on November 27, 2021, making Jake Dickert the 34th coach in team history. On November 29, 2021 Lincoln Riley was hired as the 30th head coach in USC history. The Washington Huskies hired Kalen DeBoer on November 30, 2021, making DeBoer the 30th coach in team history. Mario Cristobal accept the coaching vacancy at Miami (FL) on December 6, finishing the season with a 10−3 record. He finished his career with a 35−13 record. He was replaced for the Alamo Bowl on interim basis by passing game coordinator and wide receivers Bryan McClendon.

=== Coaches ===
Note: All stats current through the completion of the 2020 season

Team	Head coach	Years at school	Overall record	Record at school	Pac–12 record
Arizona	Jedd Fisch	1	1–1	0–0	1–0
Arizona State	Herm Edwards	4	17–13	17–13	11–11
California	Justin Wilcox	5	21–21	21–21	11–20
Colorado	Karl Dorrell	2	39–29	4–2	3–1
Oregon	Bryan McClendon	1	0–0	0–0	0–0
Oregon State	Jonathan Smith	4	9–22	9–22	7–18
Stanford	David Shaw	11	90–36	90–36	62–24
UCLA	Chip Kelly	4	56–28	10–21	10–15
USC	Donte Williams	1	0–0	0–0	0–0
Utah	Kyle Whittingham	17	134–66	134–66	45–41
Washington	Bob Gregory	1	0–0	0–0	0–0
Washington State	Jake Dickert	1	0–0	0–0	0–0

Note:

- Clay Helton was fired from USC on September 13 after a 1−1 start. He finished his tenure with a 46–24 record.
- Nick Rolovich was fired from Washington State on October 18 after a 4−3 start. He finished his tenure with a 5–6 record.
- Jimmy Lake was fired from Washington on November 14 after a 4–5 start. He finished his tenure with a 7–6 record.
- Mario Cristobal was hired at Miami (FL) on December 6, finishing the season with a 10−3 record. He finished his tenure with a 35–13 record.

== Rankings ==
		Pre	Wk 2	Wk 3	Wk 4	Wk 5	Wk 6	Wk 7	Wk 8	Wk 9	Wk 10	Wk 11	Wk 12	Wk 13	Wk 14	Wk 15	Final
Arizona	AP		RV														
Arizona	C																
Arizona	CFP	Not released															
Arizona State	AP	25	23	19	RV	RV	22	18	RV	RV							
Arizona State	C	RV	25	21	RV	RV	25	22	RV	RV	RV	RV	RV				
Arizona State	CFP	Not released															
California	AP																
California	C	RV															
California	CFP	Not released															
Colorado	AP																
Colorado	C																
Colorado	CFP	Not released															
Oregon	AP	11	12	4	3	3	8	9	10	7	7	5	4	11	10	15	22
Oregon	C	12	11	4	4	3	9	10	10	8	7	6	5	11	10	15	
Oregon	CFP	Not released									4	3	3	11	10	14	
Oregon State	AP					RV	RV			RV							
Oregon State	C					RV	RV			RV				RV			
Oregon State	CFP	Not released															
Stanford	AP			RV	RV	RV											
Stanford	C	RV		RV													
Stanford	CFP	Not released															
UCLA	AP	RV	16	13	24	20	RV	RV	RV	RV							
UCLA	C	RV	16	13	24	20			RV						RV	RV	
UCLA	CFP	Not released															
USC	AP	15	14	RV	RV												
USC	C	14	14	RV	RV												
USC	CFP	Not released															
Utah	AP	24	21	RV					RV		RV	RV	24	16	10	10	12
Utah	C	RV	18	RV					RV	RV	RV	RV	25	19	17	11	
Utah	CFP	Not released										24	23	19	17	11	
Washington	AP	20															
Washington	C	21															
Washington	CFP	Not released															
Washington State	AP																
Washington State	C																
Washington State	CFP	Not released															

Legend
	Improvement in ranking
	Drop in ranking
	Not ranked previous week
	No change in ranking from previous week
RV	Received votes but were not ranked in Top 25 of poll
т	Tied with team above or below also with this symbol

== Schedules ==
Index to colors and formatting
Pac-12 member won
Pac-12 member lost
Pac-12 teams in **bold**

All times are in Pacific Time. Pac-12 teams in bold.

† denotes Homecoming game

Rankings reflect those of the AP poll for that week.

=== Regular season ===
The regular season is scheduled to begin on August 28, 2021, and end on December 3, 2021.

==== Week 0 ====
Date	Time	Visiting team	Home team	Site	TV	Result	Attendance	Ref.
August 28	12:30 p.m.	Hawaii	**UCLA**	Rose Bowl Stadium • Pasadena, CA	ESPN	**W** 44–10	32,982	
^{#}Rankings from AP Poll released prior to game. All times are in Pacific Time.

==== Week 1 ====
Date	Time	Visiting team	Home team	Site	TV	Result	Attendance	Ref.
September 2	4:30 p.m.	No. 6 (FCS) Weber State	No. 24 **Utah**	Rice–Eccles Stadium • Salt Lake City, UT	P12N	**W** 44–10	51,511	
September 2	7:30 p.m.	Southern Utah	No. 25 **Arizona State**	Sun Devil Stadium • Tempe, AZ	P12N	**V** 41–14 (vacated)	44,456	
September 3	6:00 p.m.	Northern Colorado	**Colorado**	Folsom Field • Boulder, CO	P12N	**W** 35–7	44,153	
September 4	9:00 a.m.	Kansas State	**Stanford**	AT&T Stadium • Arlington, TX	FS1	**L** 7–24	28,668	
September 4	11:00 a.m.	Fresno State	No. 11 **Oregon**	Autzen Stadium • Eugene, OR	P12N	**W** 34–21	43,276	
September 4	2:00 p.m.	San Jose State	No. 15 **USC**	LA Memorial Coliseum • Los Angeles, CA	P12N	**W** 30–7	54,398	
September 4	4:00 p.m.	**Oregon State**	Purdue	Ross–Ade Stadium • West Lafayette, IN	FS1	**L** 21–30	53,656	
September 4	5:00 p.m.	No. 9 (FCS) Montana	No. 20 **Washington**	Husky Stadium • Seattle, WA	P12N	**L** 7–13	61,036	
September 4	5:30 p.m.	No. 16 LSU	**UCLA**	Rose Bowl • Pasadena, CA	Fox	**W** 38–27	68,123	
September 4	7:30 p.m.	BYU	**Arizona**	Allegiant Stadium • Paradise, NV	ESPN	**L** 16–24	54,541	
September 4	7:30 p.m.	Nevada	**California**	California Memorial Stadium • Berkeley, CA	FS1	**L** 17–22	35,117	
September 4	8:00 p.m.	Utah State	**Washington State**	Martin Stadium • Pullman, WA	P12N	**L** 23–26	24,944	
^{#}Rankings from AP Poll released prior to game. All times are in Pacific Time.

==== Week 2 ====
Date	Time	Visiting team	Home team	Site	TV	Result	Attendance	Ref.
September 11	9:00 a.m.	No. 12 **Oregon**	No. 3 Ohio State	Ohio Stadium • Columbus, OH	FOX	**W** 35–28	100,482	
September 11	12:30 p.m.	No. 5 Texas A&M	**Colorado**	Empower Field at Mile High • Denver, CO	FOX	**L** 7–10	61,203	
September 11	12:30 p.m.	**California**	TCU	Amon G. Carter Stadium • Fort Worth, TX	ESPNU	**L** 32–34	38,631	
September 11	3:00 p.m.	Portland State	**Washington State**	Martin Stadium • Pullman, WA	P12N	**W** 44–24	22,651	
September 11	5:00 p.m.	**Washington**	Michigan	Michigan Stadium • Ann Arbor, MI	ABC	**L** 10–31	108,345	
September 11	7:00 p.m.	San Diego State	**Arizona**	Arizona Stadium • Tucson, AZ	P12N	**L** 14–38	39,097	
September 11	7:15 p.m.	No. 21 **Utah**	BYU	LaVell Edwards Stadium • Provo, UT (Holy War)	ESPN	**L** 17–26	63,470	
September 11	7:30 p.m.	UNLV	No. 23 **Arizona State**	Sun Devil Stadium • Tempe, AZ	ESPN2	**V** 37–10 (vacated)	42,918	
September 11	7:30 p.m.	**Stanford**	No. 14 **USC**	LA Memorial Coliseum • Los Angeles, CA (Stanford–USC football rivalry)	FOX	**STAN** 42–28	56,945	
September 11	8:00 p.m.	Hawaii	**Oregon State**	Reser Stadium • Corvallis, OR	FS1	**W** 45–27	27,701	
^{#}Rankings from AP Poll released prior to game. All times are in Pacific Time.

Date	Bye Week
September 11	No. 16 UCLA

==== Week 3 ====
Date	Time	Visiting team	Home team	Site	TV	Result	Attendance	Ref.
September 18	10:00 a.m.	Minnesota	**Colorado**	Folsom Field • Boulder, CO	P12N	**L** 0–30	47,482	
September 18	12:30 p.m.	**USC**	**Washington State**	Martin Stadium • Pullman, WA	FOX	**USC** 45–14	24,714	
September 18	12:30 p.m.	Idaho	**Oregon State**	Reser Stadium • Corvallis, OR	P12N	**W** 42–0	26,797	
September 18	1:00 p.m.	Sacramento State	**California**	California Memorial Stadium • Berkeley, CA	P12N	**W** 42–30	31,982	
September 18	1:15 p.m.	Arkansas State	**Washington**	Husky Stadium • Seattle, WA	P12N	**W** 52–3	58,772	
September 18	4:00 p.m.	**Utah**	San Diego State	Dignity Health Sports Park • Carson, CA	CBSSN	**L** 31–33 ^{3OT}	11,090	
September 18	4:30 p.m.	Stony Brook	No. 4 **Oregon**	Autzen Stadium • Eugene, OR	P12N	**W** 48–7	42,782	
September 18	5:00 p.m.	**Stanford**	Vanderbilt	Vanderbilt Stadium • Nashville, TN	ESPNU	**W** 41–23	21,124	
September 18	7:00 p.m.	NAU	**Arizona**	Arizona Stadium • Tucson, AZ	P12N	**L** 19–21	33,481	
September 18	7:15 p.m.	No. 19 **Arizona State**	No. 23 BYU	LaVell Edwards Stadium • Provo, UT	ESPN	**L** 17–27	61,570	
September 18	7:45 p.m.	Fresno State	No. 13 **UCLA**	Rose Bowl • Pasadena, CA	P12N	**L** 37–40	50,698	
^{#}Rankings from AP Poll released prior to game. All times are in Pacific Time.

==== Week 4 ====
Date	Time	Visiting team	Home team	Site	TV	Result	Attendance	Ref.
September 25	11:30 a.m.	**Washington State**	**Utah**	Rice–Eccles Stadium • Salt Lake City, UT	P12N	**UTAH** 24–13	51,483	
September 25	3:00 p.m.	No. 24 **UCLA**	**Stanford**	Stanford Stadium • Stanford, CA	P12N	**UCLA** 35–24	47,236	
September 25	6:30 p.m.	**California**	**Washington**	Husky Stadium • Seattle, WA	P12N	**WASH** 31–24 ^{OT}	60,104	
September 25	7:30 p.m.	**Arizona**	No. 3 **Oregon**	Autzen Stadium • Eugene, OR	ESPN	**ORE** 41–19	50,024	
September 25	7:30 p.m.	**Oregon State**	**USC**	LA Memorial Coliseum • Los Angeles, CA	FS1	**OSU** 45–27	51,564	
September 25	7:30 p.m.	**Colorado**	**Arizona State**	Sun Devil Stadium • Tempe, AZ	ESPNU	**ASU** 35–13 (vacated)	44,803	
^{#}Rankings from AP Poll released prior to game. All times are in Pacific Time.

==== Week 5 ====
Date	Time	Visiting team	Home team	Site	TV	Result	Attendance	Ref.
October 2	11:00 a.m.	**USC**	**Colorado**	Folsom Field • Boulder, CO	P12N	**USC** 37–14	48,197	
October 2	12:30 p.m.	No. 3 **Oregon**	**Stanford**	Stanford Stadium • Stanford, CA	ABC	**STAN** 31–24	31,610	
October 2	2:30 p.m.	**Washington State**	**California**	California Memorial Stadium • Berkeley, CA	P12N	**WSU** 21–6	40,286	
October 2	6:00 p.m.	**Washington**	**Oregon State**	Reser Stadium • Corevallis, OR	P12N	**OSU** 27–24	33,733	
October 2	7:30 p.m.	**Arizona State**	No. 20 **UCLA**	Rose Bowl • Pasadena, CA	FS1	**ASU** 42–23 (vacated)	40,522	
^{#}Rankings from AP Poll released prior to game. All times are in Pacific Time.

Date	Bye Week	
October 2	Arizona	Utah

==== Week 6 ====
Date	Time	Visiting team	Home team	Site	TV	Result	Attendance	Ref.
October 8	7:30 p.m.	**Stanford**	No. 22 **Arizona State**	Sun Devil Stadium • Tempe, AZ	ESPN	**ASU** 28–10 (vacated)	46,192	
October 9	1:00 p.m.	**Oregon State**	**Washington State**	Martin Stadium • Pullman, WA	P12N	**WSU** 31–24	24,157	
October 9	5:00 p.m.	**Utah**	**USC**	LA Memorial Coliseum • Los Angeles, CA	FOX	**UTAH** 42–26	54,088	
October 9	7:30 p.m.	**UCLA**	**Arizona**	Arizona Stadium • Tucson, AZ	ESPN	**UCLA** 34–16	43,258	
^{#}Rankings from AP Poll released prior to game. All times are in Pacific Time.

Date	Bye Week			
October 9	California	Colorado	No. 8 Oregon	Washington

==== Week 7 ====
Date	Time	Visiting team	Home team	Site	TV	Result	Attendance	Ref.
October 15	7:30 p.m.	**California**	No. 9 **Oregon**	Autzen Stadium • Eugene, OR	ESPN	**ORE** 24–17	50,008	
October 16	12:30 p.m.	**Arizona**	**Colorado**	Folsom Field • Boulder, CO	P12N	**COL** 34–0	49,806	
October 16	4:30 p.m.	**Stanford**	**Washington State**	Martin Stadium • Pullman, WA	ESPNU	**WSU** 34–31	26,171	
October 16	5:30 p.m.	**UCLA**	**Washington**	Husky Stadium • Seattle, WA	FOX	**UCLA** 24–17	62,266	
October 16	7:00 p.m.	No. 18 **Arizona State**	**Utah**	Rice-Eccles Stadium • Salt Lake City, UT	ESPN	**UTAH** 35–21	51,724	
^{#}Rankings from AP Poll released prior to game. All times are in Pacific Time.

Date	Bye Week	
October 16	Oregon State	USC

==== Week 8 ====
Date	Time	Visiting team	Home team	Site	TV	Result	Attendance	Ref.
October 22	7:30 p.m.	**Washington**	**Arizona**	Arizona Stadium • Tucson, AZ	ESPN2	**WASH** 21–16	30,880	
October 23	12:30 p.m.	No. 10 **Oregon**	**UCLA**	Rose Bowl • Pasadena, CA (College Gameday)	ABC	**ORE** 34–31	55,675	
October 23	12:30 p.m.	BYU	**Washington State**	Martin Stadium • Pullman, WA	FS1	**L** 19–21	22,541	
October 23	12:30 p.m.	**Colorado**	**California**	California Memorial Stadium • Berkeley, CA	P12N	**CAL** 26–3	36,264	
October 23	4:30 p.m.	**Utah**	**Oregon State**	Reser Stadium • Corvallis, OR	P12N	**OSU** 42–34	30,203	
October 23	4:30 p.m.	**USC**	No. 13 Notre Dame	Notre Dame Stadium • South Bend, IN (Jeweled Shillelagh)	NBC	**L** 16–31	77,622	
^{#}Rankings from AP Poll released prior to game. All times are in Pacific Time.

Date	Bye Week	
October 23	Arizona State	Stanford

==== Week 9 ====
Date	Time	Visiting team	Home team	Site	TV	Result	Attendance	Ref.
October 30	12:00 p.m.	Washington State	**Arizona State**	Sun Devil Stadium • Tempe, AZ	FS1	**WSU** 34–21	46,136	
October 30	12:30 p.m.	Colorado	No. 7 **Oregon**	Autzen Stadium • Eugene, OR	FOX	**ORE** 52–29	51,449	
October 30	4:00 p.m.	Arizona	**USC**	LA Memorial Coliseum • Los Angeles, CA	ESPNU	**USC** 41–34	52,435	
October 30	4:00 p.m.	Oregon State	**California**	California Memorial Stadium • Berkeley, CA	P12N	**CAL** 39–25	38,572	
October 30	7:00 p.m.	UCLA	**Utah**	Rice–Eccles Stadium • Salt Lake City, UT	ESPN	**UTAH** 44–24	51,922	
October 30	7:30 p.m.	Washington	**Stanford**	Stanford Stadium • Stanford, CA	FS1	**WASH** 20–13	28,014	
^{#}Rankings from AP Poll released prior to game. All times are in Pacific Time.

==== Week 10 ====
Date	Time	Visiting team	Home team	Site	TV	Result	Attendance	Ref.
November 5	7:30 p.m.	**Utah**	**Stanford**	Stanford Stadium • Stanford, CA	FS1	**UTAH** 52–7	26,410	
November 6	12:00 p.m.	**California**	**Arizona**	Arizona Stadium • Tucson, AZ	P12N	**ARIZ** 10–3	30,677	
November 6	4:00 p.m.	**Oregon State**	**Colorado**	Folsom Field • Boulder, CO	P12N	**COL** 37–34 ^{2OT}	47,984	
November 6	4:30 p.m.	No. 7 **Oregon**	**Washington**	Husky Stadium • Seattle, WA	ABC	**ORE** 26–16	63,193	
November 6	7:30 p.m.	**USC**	**Arizona State**	Sun Devil Stadium • Tempe, AZ	ESPN	**ASU** 31–16 (vacated)	53,926	
^{#}Rankings from AP Poll released prior to game. All times are in Pacific Time.

Date	Bye Week	
November 2	UCLA	Washington State

==== Week 11 ====
Date	Time	Visiting team	Home team	Site	TV	Result	Attendance	Ref.
November 13	11:00 a.m.	Utah	**Arizona**	Arizona Stadium • Tucson, AZ	P12N	**UTAH** 38–29	32,008	
November 13	12:30 p.m.	USC	**California**	California Memorial Stadium • Berkeley, CA	FS1	Postponed due to COVID-19 issues	NA	
November 13	2:30 p.m.	Stanford	**Oregon State**	Reser Stadium • Corvallis, OR	P12N	**OSU** 35–14	35,129	
November 13	4:00 p.m.	Arizona State	**Washington**	Husky Stadium • Seattle, WA	FS1	**ASU** 35–30 (vacated)	57,858	
November 13	6:00 p.m.	Colorado	**UCLA**	Rose Bowl • Pasadena, CA	P12N	**UCLA** 44-20	36,573	
November 13	7:30 p.m.	Washington State	No. 5 **Oregon**	Autzen Stadium • Eugene, OR	ESPN	**ORE** 38-24	52,327	
^{#}Rankings from AP Poll released prior to game. All times are in Pacific Time.

==== Week 12 ====
Date	Time	Visiting team	Home team	Site	TV	Result	Attendance	Ref.
November 19	6:00 p.m.	**Arizona**	**Washington State**	Martin Stadium • Pullman, WA	P12N	**WSU** 44–18	22,541	
November 20	12:00 p.m.	**Washington**	**Colorado**	Folsom Field • Boulder, CO	P12N	**COL** 20-17	41,284	
November 20	1:00 p.m.	**UCLA**	**USC**	LA Memorial Coliseum • Los Angeles, CA (Victory Bell)	FOX	**UCLA** 62–33	68,152	
November 20	4:00 p.m.	**California**	**Stanford**	Stanford Stadium • Stanford, CA (124th Big Game/Stanford Axe)	P12N	**CAL** 41–11	49,265	
November 20	4:30 p.m.	No. 4 **Oregon**	No. 24 **Utah**	Rice-Eccles Stadium • Salt Lake City, UT	ABC	**UTAH** 38–7	52,724	
November 20	7:30 p.m.	**Arizona State**	**Oregon State**	Reser Stadium • Corvallis, OR	ESPN	**OSU** 24−10	29,579	
^{#}Rankings from AP Poll released prior to game. All times are in Pacific Time.

==== Week 13 ====
Date	Time	Visiting team	Home team	Site	TV	Result	Attendance	Ref.
November 26	1:00 p.m.	**Colorado**	No. 16 **Utah**	Rice-Eccles Stadium • Salt Lake City, UT (Rumble in the Rockies)	FOX	**UTAH** 28–13	51,538	
November 26	5:00 p.m.	**Washington State**	**Washington**	Husky Stadium • Seattle, WA (Apple Cup)	FS1	**WSU** 40–13	68,077	
November 27	12:30 p.m.	**Oregon State**	No. 11 **Oregon**	Autzen Stadium • Eugene, CO (Oregon–Oregon State football rivalry)	ESPN	**ORE** 38–29	56,408	
November 27	1:00 p.m.	**Arizona**	**Arizona State**	Sun Devil Stadium • Tempe, AZ (Territorial Cup)	P12N	**ASU** 38–15 (vacated)	52,305	
November 27	5:00 p.m.	No. 5 Notre Dame	**Stanford**	Stanford Stadium • Stanford, CA (Legends Trophy)	FOX	**L** 14–45	31,571	
November 27	7:30 p.m.	**California**	**UCLA**	Rose Bowl • Pasadena, CA (California–UCLA rivalry)	FS1	**UCLA** 42–14	36,156	
November 27	7:30 p.m.	No. 13 BYU	**USC**	LA Memorial Coliseum • Los Angeles, CA	ESPN	**L** 31–35	55,926	
^{#}Rankings from AP Poll released prior to game. All times are in Pacific Time.

==== Week 14 ====
Date	Time	Visiting team	Home team	Site	TV	Result	Attendance	Ref.
December 4	8:00 p.m.	**USC**	**California**	California Memorial Stadium • Berkeley, CA	FS1	**CAL** 24–14	42,076	
^{#}Rankings from AP Poll released prior to game. All times are in Pacific Time.

- The USC vs Cal football game was rescheduled from November 13 because of Covid-19 issues within the Cal football program.

=== Pac-12 Championship Game ===
The Pac-12 Championship Game, the conference's eleventh championship game, will be played on December 3, 2021, at the home stadium of the Las Vegas Raiders at Allegiant Stadium in Paradise, Nevada. It will feature the teams with the best conference records from each division, the North and the South. Utah, the South Division winner, will play Oregon, the winner of the North Division.

Date	Time	Visiting team	Home team	Site	TV	Result	Attendance	Ref.
December 3	5:00 p.m.	No. 10 Oregon	No. 14 Utah	Allegiant Stadium • Paradise, NV	ABC	**UTAH** 38-10	56,511	
^{#}Rankings from AP Poll released prior to game. All times are in Pacific Time.

== Postseason ==
=== Bowl games ===
For the 2020–2025 bowl cycle, The Pac-12 will have annually seven appearances in the following bowls: Rose Bowl (unless they are selected for playoffs filled by a Pac-12 team if champion is in the playoffs), LA Bowl, Las Vegas Bowl, Alamo Bowl, Holiday Bowl, and Sun Bowl. The Pac-12 teams will go to a New Year's Six bowl if a team finishes higher than the champions of Power Five conferences in the final College Football Playoff rankings. The Pac-12 champion are also eligible for the College Football Playoff if they are among the top four teams in the final CFP ranking.

Legend
Pac-12 win
Pac-12 loss

Bowl game	Date	Site	Television	Time (PST)	Pac-12 team	Opponent	Score	Attendance
Los Angeles Bowl	December 18, 2021	SoFi Stadium • Inglewood, CA	ABC	4:30 p.m.	Oregon State	**Utah State**	**L** 13–24	29,896
Holiday Bowl	December 28, 2021	Petco Park • San Diego, California	FOX	5:00 p.m.	UCLA	No. 18 NC State	**No Contest** due to Covid issues with UCLA	NA
Alamo Bowl	December 29, 2021	Alamodome • San Antonio, Texas	ESPN	6:15 p.m.	No. 14 Oregon	No. 16 **Oklahoma**	**L** 32–47	59,121
Las Vegas Bowl	December 30, 2021	Allegiant Stadium • Las Vegas, NV	ESPN	7:30 p.m.	Arizona State	**Wisconsin**	**L** 13–20	32,515
Tony the Tiger Sun Bowl	December 31, 2021	Sun Bowl • El Paso, TX	CBS	9:00 a.m.	Washington State	**Central Michigan**	**L** 21–24	34,540
**New Year's Six Bowl**
Rose Bowl	January 1, 2022	Rose Bowl • Pasadena, CA	ESPN	2:00 p.m.	No. 11 Utah	No. 6 **Ohio State**	**L** 45–48	87,842

Rankings are from CFP rankings. All times Pacific Time Zone. Pac-12 teams shown in bold.

=== Selection of teams ===
- **Bowl eligible (6): Arizona State, Oregon, Oregon State, UCLA, Utah, Washington State**
- **Bowl-ineligible (6): Arizona, California, Colorado, Stanford, USC, Washington**

== Head to head matchups ==
This table summarizes the head-to-head results between teams in conference play.

	Arizona	Arizona State	California	Colorado	Oregon	Oregon State	Stanford	UCLA	USC	Utah	Washington	Washington State
vs. Arizona	–	1–0	0–1	1–0	1–0	0–0	0–0	1–0	1–0	1–0	1–0	1–0
vs. Arizona State	0–1	–	0–0	0–1	0–0	1–0	0–1	0–1	0–1	1–0	0–1	1–0
vs. California	1–0	0–0	–	0–1	1–0	0–1	0–1	1–0	0–1	0–0	1–0	1–0
vs. Colorado	0–1	1–0	1–0	–	1–0	0–1	0–0	1–0	1–0	1–0	0–1	0–0
vs. Oregon	0–1	0–0	0–1	0–1	–	0–1	1–0	0–1	0–0	2–0	0–1	0–1
vs. Oregon State	0–0	0–1	1–0	1–0	1–0	–	0–1	0–0	0–1	0–1	0–1	1–0
vs. Stanford	0–0	1–0	1–0	0–0	0–1	1–0	–	1–0	0–1	1–0	1–0	1–0
vs. UCLA	0–1	1–0	0–1	0–1	1–0	0–0	0–1	–	0–1	1–0	0–1	0–0
vs. USC	0–1	1–0	1–0	0–1	0–0	1–0	1–0	1–0	–	1–0	0–0	0–1
vs. Utah	0–1	0–1	0–0	0–1	0–2	1–0	0–1	0–1	0–1	–	0–0	0–1
vs. Washington	0–1	1–0	0–1	1–0	1–0	1–0	0–1	1–0	0–0	0–0	–	1–0
vs. Washington State	0–1	0–1	0–1	0–0	1–0	0–1	0–1	0–0	1–0	1–0	0–1	–
Total	1–8	6–3	4–5	3–6	7–3	5–4	2–7	6–3	3–6	9–1	3–6	6–3

Updated with the results of all games through December 3, 2021.

=== Pac-12 vs Power Five matchups ===
The following games include Pac-12 teams competing against Power Five conferences teams from the (ACC, Big Ten, Big 12, Notre Dame, BYU and SEC). All rankings are from the AP Poll at the time of the game.

Date	Conference	Visitor	Home	Site	Score
September 4	SEC	No. 16 LSU	UCLA	Rose Bowl • Pasadena, CA	W 38–27
September 4	Big Ten	Oregon State	Purdue	Ross Add Stadium • West Lafayette, IN	L 21–30
September 4	Big 12	Stanford	Kansas State	AT&T Stadium • Arlington, TX	L 7–24
September 4	Independent	Arizona	BYU	Allegiant Stadium • Las Vegas, NV	L 16–24
September 11	Big 12	California	TCU	Amon G. Carter Stadium • Fort Worth, TX	L 32–34
September 11	Big Ten	No. 12 Oregon	No. 3 Ohio State	Ohio Stadium • Columbus, OH	W 35–28
September 11	SEC	No. 6 Texas A&M	Colorado	Folsom Field • Boulder, CO	L 7–10
September 11	Independent	No. 21 Utah	BYU	LaVell Edwards Stadium • Provo, UT	L 17–26
September 11	Big Ten	Washington	Michigan	Michigan Stadium • Ann Arbor, MI	L 10–31
September 18	Independent	No. 19 Arizona State	No. 23 BYU	LaVell Edwards Stadium • Provo, UT	L 17–27
September 18	Big Ten	Minnesota	Colorado	Folsom Field • Boulder, CO	L 0–30
September 18	SEC	Stanford	Vanderbilt	Vanderbilt Stadium • Nashville, TN	W 41–23
October 23	Independent	BYU	Washington State	Martin Stadium • Pullman, WA	L 19–21
October 23	Independent	USC	No. 13 Notre Dame	Notre Dame Stadium • Notre Dame, IN	L 16–31
November 27	Independent	No. 13 BYU	USC	Los Angeles Memorial Coliseum • Los Angeles, CA	L 31–35
November 27	Independent	No. 5 Notre Dame	Stanford	Stanford Stadium • Stanford, CA	L 14–45

=== Pac-12 vs Group of Five matchups ===
The following games include Pac-12 teams competing against teams from the American, C-USA, MAC, Mountain West or Sun Belt.

Date	Conference	Visitor	Home	Site	Score
August 28	Mountain West	Hawaii	UCLA	Rose Bowl • Pasadena, CA	W 44–10
September 4	Mountain West	Fresno State	No. 11 Oregon	Autzen Stadium • Eugene, OR	W 31–24
September 4	Mountain West	Nevada	California	California Memorial Stadium • Berkeley, CA	L 17–22
September 4	Mountain West	San Jose State	No. 15 USC	Los Angeles Memorial Coliseum • Los Angeles, CA	W 30–7
September 4	Mountain West	Utah State	Washington State	Martin Stadium • Pullman, WA	L 23–26
September 11	Mountain West	Hawaii	Oregon State	Reser Stadium • Corvallis, OR	W 45–27
September 11	Mountain West	San Diego State	Arizona	Arizona Stadium • Tucson, AZ	L 14–38
September 11	Mountain West	UNLV	No. 23 Arizona State	Sun Devil Stadium • Tempe, AZ	W 37–10
September 18	Sun Belt	Arkansas State	Washington	Husky Stadium • Seattle, WA	W 52–3
September 18	Mountain West	Fresno State	No. 13 UCLA	Rose Bowl • Pasadena, CA	L 37–40
September 18	Mountain West	Utah	San Diego State	Dignity Health Sports Park • Carson, CA	L 31–33 ^{3OT}

=== Pac-12 vs FBS independents matchups ===
The following games include Pac-12 teams competing against FBS Independents, which includes Army, Liberty, New Mexico State, UConn or UMass.

=== Pac-12 vs FCS matchups ===
The Football Championship Subdivision comprises 13 conferences and two independent programs.

Date	Visitor	Home	Site	Score
September 2	Weber State	No. 24 Utah	Rice-Eccles Stadium • Salt Lake City, UT	W 40–17
September 2	Southern Utah	No. 25 Arizona State	Sun Devil Stadium • Tempe, AZ	W 41–14
September 3	Northern Colorado	Colorado	Folsom Field • Boulder, CO	W 35–7
September 4	Montana	No. 20 Washington	Husky Stadium • Seattle, WA	L 7–13
September 11	Portland State	Washington State	Martin Stadium • Pullman, WA	W 44–24
September 18	Northern Arizona	Arizona	Arizona Stadium • Tucson, AZ	L 19–21
September 18	Sacramento State	California	California Memorial Stadium • Berkeley, CA	W 42–30
September 18	Stony Brook	No. 4 Oregon	Autzen Stadium • Eugene, OR	W 48–7
September 18	Idaho	Oregon State	Reser Stadium • Corvallis, OR	W 42–0

=== Pac-12 records vs other conferences ===
2021–22 records against non-conference foes:

Regular season

Power 5 Conferences	Record
ACC	0–0
Big Ten	1–3
Big 12	0–2
BYU/Notre Dame	0–7
SEC	2–1
Power 5 Total	3–13
Other FBS Conferences	Record
American	0–0
C–USA	0–0
Independents (excluding BYU & Notre Dame)	0–0
MAC	0–0
Mountain West	5–5
Sun Belt	1–0
Other FBS Total	6–5
FCS Opponents	Record
Football Championship Subdivision	7–2
Total non-conference record	16–20

Postseason

Power Conferences 5	Record
Big Ten	0–2
Big 12	0–1
Power 5 Total	0–3
Other FBS Conferences	Record
MAC	0–1
Mountain West	0–1
Other FBS total	0–2
Total Bowl record	0–5

== Awards and honors ==
=== Player of the week honors ===
Week	Offensive			Defensive			Special teams			Offensive line			Defensive line			Freshman		
Week	Player	Team	Position	Player	Team	Position	Player	Team	Position	Player	Team	Position	Player	Team	Position	Player	Team	Position
Week 1 (Sep. 7)	Zach Charbonnet	UCLA	RB	Devin Lloyd	Utah	LB	D. J. Taylor	Arizona State	KR/PR	Alec Anderson	UCLA	OT	DJ Davidson	Arizona State	DL	Justin Flowe	Oregon	LB
Week 2 (Sep. 13)	C. J. Verdell	Oregon	RB	Kyu Blu Kelly	Stanford	CB	Travell Harris	Washington State	WR	Alex Forsyth	Oregon	C	Bradyn Swinson	Oregon	DE	Tanner McKee	Stanford	QB
Week 3 (Sept. 20)	Jaxson Dart	USC	QB	Verone McKinley III	Oregon	S	Britain Covey	Utah	PR/WR	T. J. Bass	Oregon	G	Drake Jackson	USC	OLB	Jaxson Dart	USC	QB
Week 4 (Sept. 27)	B. J. Baylor	Oregon State	RB	Bennett Williams	Oregon	S	Kyle Philips	UCLA	WR/KR	Nathan Eldridge	Oregon State	C	Van Fillinger	Utah	DE	Karene Reid	Utah	LB
Week 5 (Oct. 4)	Jayden Daniels	Arizona State	QB	Avery Roberts	Oregon State	LB	Parker Lewis	USC	PK	LaDarius Henderson	Arizona State	G	Brennan Jackson	Washington State	DE	Tanner McKee	Stanford	QB
Week 6 (Oct. 11)	Cameron Rising	Utah	QB	George Hicks III	Washington State	S	Nicholas Barr-Mira	UCLA	PK	Liam Ryan	Washington State	T	Tyler Johnson	Arizona State	DE	Kamo'i Latu	Utah	S
Week 7 (Oct. 18)	Cameron Rising (2)	Utah	QB	Devin Lloyd (2)	Utah	LB	Trevor Woods	Colorado	S	Nick Ford	Utah	C	Brennan Jackson (2)	Washington State	DE	Noah Sewell	Oregon	LB
Week 8 (Oct. 25)	B. J. Baylor (2)	Oregon State	RB	Kayvon Thibodeaux	Oregon	DE	Luke Musgrave	Oregon State	TE	Nous Keobounnam	Oregon State	G	Kayvon Thibodeaux	Oregon	DE	Noah Sewell (2)	Oregon	LB
Week 9 (Nov. 1)	Tavion Thomas	Utah	RB	Carson Bruener	Washington	LB	Peyton Henry	Washington	PK	Nick Ford (2)	Utah	C	Ron Stone Jr.	Washington State	DE	Carson Bruener	Washington	LB
Week 10 (Nov. 8)	Rachaad White	Arizona State	RB	Devin Lloyd (3)	Utah	LB	Kyle Ostendorp	Arizona	P	Braeden Daniels	Utah	G	Kyon Barrs	Arizona	DT	Jeffrey Bassa	Oregon	LB
Week 11 (Nov. 15)	Rachaad White (2)	Arizona State	RB	Kayvon Thibodeaux (2)	Oregon	DE	Kyle Philips (2)	UCLA	WR/KR	Dohnovan West	Arizona State	C	Kayvon Thibodeaux (2)	Oregon	DE	Byron Cardwell	Oregon	RB
Week 12 (Nov. 22)	Dorian Thompson-Robinson	UCLA	QB	Jahad Woods	Washington State	LB	Britain Covey (2)	Utah	WR/KR	Ben Coleman	California	G	Junior Tafuna	Utah	DT	Lu-Magia Hearns III	California	CB
Week 13 (Nov. 29)	Anthony Brown	Oregon	QB	Armani Marsh	Washington State	CB	Dean Janikowski	Washington State	K	Paul Grattan	UCLA	G	Mitchell Agude	UCLA	DE	Jayden de Laura	Washington State	QB

==== Totals per school ====
School	Total
Arizona	2
Arizona State	8
California	2
Colorado	1
Oregon	2
Oregon State	2
Stanford	1
UCLA	8
USC	4
Utah	15
Washington	1
Washington State	10

=== Pac-12 individual awards ===
The following individuals received postseason honors as voted by the Pac-12 Conference football coaches at the end of the season.

Award	Player	School
Offensive Player of the Year	Drake London	USC
Defensive Player of the Year	Devin Lloyd	Utah
Offensive Freshman of the Year	Jayden de Laura	Washington State
Defensive Freshman of the Year	Junior Tafuna	Utah
Scholar Athlete of the Year	Britain Covey	Utah
Coach of the Year	Kyle Whittingham	Utah

=== All-conference teams ===
The following players earned All-Pac-12 honors. Any teams showing (_) following their name are indicating the number of All-Pac-12 Conference Honors awarded to that university for 1st team and 2nd team, respectively.

First Team

Position	Player	Class	Team
First Team Offense
QB	Cameron Rising	So.	Utah
RB	B. J. Baylor	R-Jr.	Oregon State
RB	Tavion Thomas	So.	Utah (2)
WR	Drake London	Jr.	USC
WR	Kyle Philips	R-Jr.	UCLA
TE	Greg Dulcich	R-Jr.	UCLA (2)
OL	Abraham Lucas	R-Sr.	Washington State
OL	Nick Ford†	Jr.	Utah (3)
OL	Sean Rhyan	Jr.	UCLA (3)
OL	Nathan Eldridge†	R-Sr.	Oregon State (2)
OL	Jaxson Kirkland†	Jr.	Washington
OL	T. J. Bass	Jr.	Oregon
First Team Defense
DL	Kayvon Thibodeaux†	So.	Oregon (2)
DL	Mika Tafua	Jr.	Utah (4)
DL	Tuli Tuipulotu	So.	USC (2)
DL	Brandon Dorlus	So.	Oregon (3)
DL	Ron Stone Jr.	R-Jr.	Washington State (2)
DL	Tyler Johnson	Gr.	Arizona State
LB	Devin Lloyd†	Jr.	Utah (5)
LB	Noah Sewell	Fr.	Oregon (4)
LB	Avery Roberts†	R-Jr.	Oregon State (3)
DB	Trent McDuffie	So.	Washington (2)
DB	Verone McKinley III	So.	Oregon (5)
DB	Kyler Gordon	So.	Washington (3)
DB	Elijah Hicks	Sr.	California
First team special teams
PK	Dean Janikowski	R-So.	Washington State (3)
P	Kyle Ostendorp	So.	Arizona
RS	Britain Covey‡	Jr.	Utah (6)
AP/ST	Stanley Berryhill	R-Jr.	Arizona (2)

Second Team

Position	Player	Class	Team
Second Team Offense
QB	Dorian Thompson-Robinson	Sr.	UCLA (4)
RB	Zach Charbonnet	Jr.	UCLA (5)
RB	Rachaad White	R-Sr.	Arizona State (2)
WR	Calvin Jackson Jr.	Gr.	Washington State (4)
WR	Travell Harris	R-Sr.	Washington State (5)
TE	Brant Kuithe	Jr.	Utah (7)
OL	Bamidele Olaseni	Sr.	Utah (8)
OL	Braeden Daniels	So.	Utah (9)
OL	Kellen Diesch	Gr.	Arizona State (3)
OL	Alex Forsyth	Jr.	Oregon (6)
OL	Dohnovan West	Jr.	Arizona State (4)
Second Team Defense
DL	Kyon Barrs	So.	Arizona (3)
DL	Thomas Booker	Sr.	Stanford
DL	Mitchell Agude	Sr.	UCLA (6)
DL	DJ Davidson	Gr.	Arizona State (5)
LB	Darien Butler	Sr.	Arizona State (6)
LB	Drake Jackson	Jr.	USC (3)
LB	Nate Landman	Sr.	Colorado
DB	Clark Phillips III	Fr.	Utah (10)
DB	Kyu Blu Kelly	Jr.	Stanford (2)
DB	Quentin Lake	Sr.	UCLA (7)
DB	Qwuantrezz Knight	R-Sr.	UCLA (8)
Second team special teams
PK	Camden Lewis	So.	Oregon (7)
PK	Parker Lewis	So.	USC (4)
P	Race Porter	Sr.	Washington (4)
RS	Kyle Philips	R-Jr.	UCLA (9)
AP/ST	Jack Colletto	R-Jr.	Oregon State (4)

Notes:

- RS = Return specialist
- AP/ST = All-purpose/special teams player (not a kicker or returner)
- † Two-time first team selection;
- ‡ Three-time first team selection

Honorable mentions

- ARIZONA: WR Stanley Berryhill, R-Jr.; K Lucas Havrisik, Sr.; DL Trevon Mason Sr.; OL Josh McCauley, R-Sr.; LB Anthony Pandy Sr.
- ARIZONA STATE: OL LaDarius Henderson, Jr.; TE Curtis Hodges, Gr.; DB Jack Jones, Gr.; DB Chase Lucas, Gr.; WR Ricky Pearsall, Jr.; DB DeAndre Pierce, Gr.; LB Merlin Robertson Sr.
- CALIFORNIA: AP/ST Nick Alftin, R-Jr.; LB Marqez Bimage Sr.; OL Matthew Cindric, R-Jr.; OL Ben Coleman, R-So.; QB Chase Garbers, R-Sr.; LB Cameron Goode, R-Sr.; DB Lu-Magia Hearns, III, Fr.; OL McKade Mettauer Jr.; RS Nikko Remigio, Sr.; DL JH Tevis, R-Jr.
- COLORADO: AP/ST Daniel Arias, Jr.; DB Mekhi Blackmon, Jr.; RB Jarek Broussard, So.; DB Christian Gonzalez, Fr.; OL Kary Kutsch Sr.; DL Jalen Sami, So.; P Josh Watts Jr.; LB Carson Wells Jr.
- OREGON: DL Popo Aumavae, Jr.; QB Anthony Brown, Sr.; RB Travis Dye, Jr.; OL Ryan Walk Jr.; DB Mykael Wright, So.
- OREGON STATE: DB Alex Austin, R-Fr.; WR Trevon Bradford, R-Sr.; DB Jaydon Grant, R-Jr.; OL Joshua Gray, R-Fr.; K Everett Hayes, So.; OL Nous Keobounnam, R-Sr.; OL Brandon Kipper, R-Jr.; QB Chance Nolan, R-So.; DB Kitan Oladapo, R-So.; TE Teagan Quitoriano, Jr.; DL Keonte Schad Sr.; LB Omar Speights, So.; DB Rejzohn Wright, Jr.
- STANFORD: OL Branson Bragg Jr.; QB Tanner McKee, So.; OL Drake Nugent, Jr.; TE Benjamin Yurosek, So.
- UCLA: RB Brittain Brown, R-Sr.; OL Paul Grattan Jr., R-Sr.
- USC: P Ben Griffiths, R-Jr.; RB Keaontay Ingram, Sr.; LB Kana'i Mauga Sr.; OL Brett Neilon, R-Sr.; DB Chris Steele Jr.; OL Andrew Vorhees, R-Sr.
- UTAH: S Cole Bishop, Fr.; DB Vonte Davis Sr.; TE Dalton Kincaid, Sr.; OL Sataoa Laumea, R-Fr.; LB Nephi Sewell, Jr.
- WASHINGTON: WR Terrell Bynum, Jr.; DL Tuli Letuligasenoa, So.; RB Sean McGrew Sr.; LB Jackson Sirmon, So.; OL Luke Wattenberg, Sr.
- WASHINGTON STATE: RB Max Borghi, Sr.; QB Jayden de Laura, So.; DB Daniel Isom, Gr.; DL Brennan Jackson, R-Jr.; DB Armani Marsh, R-Sr., WR De'Zhaun Stribling, Fr.; AP/ST Lincoln Victor, Jr.; DB Jaylen Watson, R-Sr.; LB Jahad Woods, Gr.

=== All-Americans ===
Currently, the NCAA compiles consensus all-America teams in the sports of Division I-FBS football and Division I men's basketball using a point system computed from All-America teams named by coaches associations or media sources. The system consists of three points for a first-team honor, two points for second-team honor, and one point for third-team honor. Honorable-mention and fourth-team-or-lower recognitions are not accorded any points. College Football All-American consensus teams are compiled by position and the player accumulating the most points at each position is named first team consensus all-American. Currently, the NCAA recognizes All-Americans selected by the AP, AFCA, FWAA, TSN, and the WCFF to determine Consensus and Unanimous All-Americans. Any player named to the First Team by all five of the NCAA-recognized selectors is deemed a Unanimous All-American.

Position	Player	School	Selector	Unanimous	Consensus
First Team All-Americans
LB	Devin Lloyd	Utah	AP, FWAA, TSN, WCFF		✓
DB	Verone McKinley III	Oregon	AP, TSN, WCFF		✓
DE	Kayvon Thibodeaux	Oregon	AFCA, AP, FWAA, TSN, WCFF	✓	✓

Position	Player	School	Selector	Unanimous	Consensus
Second Team All-Americans

Position	Player	School	Selector	Unanimous	Consensus
Third Team All-Americans
DB	Trent McDuffie	Washington	AP		

*AFCA All-America Team (AFCA)
*Walter Camp All-America Team
*AP All-America teams
*Sporting News All-America Team
*Football Writers Association of America All-America Team (FWAA)
*Sports Illustrated All-America Team
*Report All-America Team (BR)
*College Football News All-America Team (CFN)
*ESPN All-America Team
*CBS Sports All-America Team
*Athlon Sports All-America Team (Athlon)
*The Athletic All-America Team
*USA Today All-America Team

=== National award winners ===
2021 college football award winners

== Home game attendance ==
Team	Stadium	Capacity	Game 1	Game 2	Game 3	Game 4	Game 5	Game 6	Game 7	Total	Average	% of Capacity
Arizona	Arizona Stadium	50,782	39,097	33,481	43,258†	30,880	30,677	32,008	—	209,401	34,900	68.72%
Arizona State	Sun Devil Stadium	56,634	44,456	42,918	44,803	46,192	46,136	53,926†	52,305	330,739	47,248	83.42%
California	California Memorial Stadium	62,467	35,117	31,982	40,286	36,264	38,572	42,076†	—	228,297	38,050	60.91%
Colorado	Folsom Field	50,183	44,153	47,482	48,197	49,806†	47,984	41,284	—	278,906	46,848	93.35%
Oregon	Autzen Stadium	54,000	43,276	42,782	50,024	50,008	51,449	52,327	**56,408†**	346,274	49,468	91.60%
Oregon State	Reser Stadium	43,154	27,701	26,797	33,733	30,203	35,129†	29,579	—	183,142	30,524	70.73%
Stanford	Stanford Stadium	50,424	47,236	31,610	28,014	26,410	49,265†	31,571	—	214,106	35,684	70.76%
UCLA	Rose Bowl	80,616	32,982	68,123†	50,698	40,522	55,675	36,573	36,156	320,729	45,818	56.83%
USC	Los Angeles Memorial Coliseum	77,500	54,398	56,945	51,564	54,088	52,435	68,152†	55,926	393,607	56,227	72.55%
Utah	Rice–Eccles Stadium	51,444	**51,511**	**51,483**	**51,724**	**51,922**	**52,724†**	**51,538**	—	310,902	**51,817**	100.72%
Washington	Husky Stadium	70,083	61,036	58,772	60,104	62,266	63,193	57,858	68,077†	431,306	61,615	87.91%
Washington State	Martin Stadium	32,952	24,944	22,651	24,714	24,157	26,171†	22,541	17,344	162,522	23,217	70.45%

Bold – Exceed capacity
†Season High

== NFL draft ==
The following list includes all Pac-12 players who were selected in the 2022 NFL draft.

Player	Position	School	Round	Overall	Team
Kayvon Thibodeaux	DE	Oregon	1	5	New York Giants
Drake London	WR	USC	1	8	Atlanta Falcons
Trent McDuffie	CB	Washington	1	21	Kansas City Chiefs
Devin Lloyd	LB	Utah	1	27	Jacksonville Jaguars
Kyler Gordon	CB	Washington	2	39	Chicago Bears
Drake Jackson	DE	USC	2	61	San Francisco 49ers
Abraham Lucas	OT	Washington State	2	72	Seattle Seahawks
Greg Dulcich	TE	UCLA	2	80	Denver Broncos
Rachaad White	RB	Arizona State	3	91	Tampa Bay Buccaneers
Sean Rhyan	OT	UCLA	3	92	Green Bay Packers
Cade Otton	TE	Washington	4	106	Tampa Bay Buccaneers
Jack Jones	DB	Arizona State	4	121	New England Patriots
DJ Davidson	DT	Arizona State	5	147	New York Giants
Thomas Booker	DT	Stanford	5	150	Houston Texans
Otito Ogbonnia	DT	UCLA	5	160	Los Angeles Chargers
Kyle Philips	WR	UCLA	5	163	Tennessee Titans
Teagan Quitoriano	TE	Oregon State	5	170	Houston Texans
Luke Wattenberg	C	Washington	5	171	Denver Broncos
Keaontay Ingram	RB	USC	6	201	Arizona Cardinals
Quentin Lake	S	UCLA	6	211	Los Angeles Rams
Cameron Goode	LB	California	7	224	Miami Dolphins
Chase Lucas	CB	Arizona State	7	237	Detroit Lions
Jaylen Watson	CB	Washington State	7	243	Kansas City Chiefs
Brittain Brown	RB	UCLA	7	250	Las Vegas Raiders
Elijah Hicks	S	California	7	254	Chicago Bears

=== Total picks by school ===
Team	Round 1	Round 2	Round 3	Round 4	Round 5	Round 6	Round 7	Total
Arizona	0	0	0	0	0	0	0	0
Arizona State	0	0	1	1	1	0	1	4
California	0	0	0	0	0	0	2	2
Colorado	0	0	0	0	0	0	0	0
Oregon	1	0	0	0	0	0	0	1
Oregon State	0	0	0	0	1	0	0	1
Stanford	0	0	0	0	1	0	0	1
UCLA	0	1	1	0	2	1	1	6
USC	1	1	0	0	0	1	0	3
Utah	1	0	0	0	0	0	0	1
Washington	1	1	0	1	1	0	0	4
Washington State	0	1	0	0	0	0	1	2
Total	4	4	2	2	6	2	5	25
