= Drake Jackson =

American football player (born 2001)

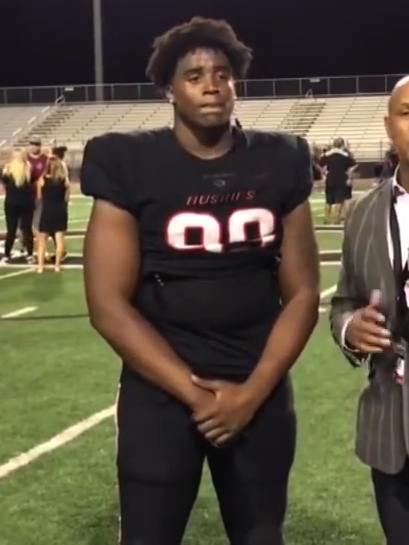
- Jackson in high school, 2018

Profile
- Position: Defensive end

Personal information
- Born: April 12, 2001 (age 25); Corona, California, U.S.
- Listed height: 6 ft 4 in (1.93 m)
- Listed weight: 273 lb (124 kg)

Career information
- High school: Centennial (Corona)
- College: USC (2019–2021)
- NFL draft: 2022: 2nd round, 61st overall pick

Career history
- San Francisco 49ers (2022–2024); Washington Commanders (2025–2026); Atlanta Falcons (2026)

Awards and highlights
- 3× second-team All-Pac-12 (2019–2021)

Career NFL statistics as of 2025
- Tackles: 24
- Sacks: 6
- Pass deflections: 9
- Interceptions: 1
- Stats at Pro Football Reference

Drake Jackson (born April 12, 2001) is an American professional football defensive end. He played college football for the USC Trojans and was selected by the San Francisco 49ers in the second round of the 2022 NFL draft.

== Early life ==
Jackson attended Centennial High School in Corona, California. As a senior, he was The Press-Enterprise Defensive Player of the Year after recording 50 tackles and eight sacks. Jackson committed to the University of Southern California (USC) to play college football.

== College career ==
Jackson started as a true freshman, recording 46 tackles and 5.5 sacks in 11 games in 2019.

== Professional career ==
Pre-draft measurables
| Height | Weight | Arm length | Hand span | Wingspan | 20-yard shuttle | Three-cone drill | Vertical jump | Broad jump |
|---|---|---|---|---|---|---|---|---|
| 6 ft 2 5/8 in (1.90 m) | 254 lb (115 kg) | 34 in (0.86 m) | 10 1/8 in (0.26 m) | 6 ft 10 5/8 in (2.10 m) | 4.28 s | 7.09 s | 36.5 in (0.93 m) | 10 ft 7 in (3.23 m) |
All values from NFL Combine/Pro Day

=== San Francisco 49ers ===
Jackson was selected in the second round with the 61st overall pick in the 2022 NFL draft. In Week 3, against the Denver Broncos, he recorded his first NFL sack.

In Week 1 of the 2023 season, Jackson recorded three sacks in the 49ers 30–7 win over the Pittsburgh Steelers. He was placed on injured reserve on November 11, 2023.

Jackson was placed on the reserve/PUP list on August 8, 2024, due to patellar tendon surgery he underwent the previous season. Jackson missed the entire 2024 season, before being waived by the 49ers on May 9, 2025.

=== Washington Commanders ===
On October 15, 2025, Jackson signed with the Washington Commanders and was placed on injured reserve the following day as a planned move to allow him to continue his patellar tendon surgery recovery from the 2023 season. On December 4, the Commanders activated Jackson.

Jackson signed a one-year contract extension with the Commanders on March 12, 2026. He was placed on injured reserve due to a hamstring injury on August 25, and released with an injury settlement on September 3.

=== Atlanta Falcons ===
On September 16, 2026, Jackson signed with the Atlanta Falcons' practice squad. He was promoted to the active roster on October 24. On November 2, Jackson was waived and re-signed to the practice squad. He was released on November 10.
