= Calvin Jackson Jr. =

American football player (born 1997)

Profile
- Position: Wide receiver

Personal information
- Born: May 7, 1997 (age 29); Fort Lauderdale, Florida, U.S.
- Listed height: 5 ft 10 in (1.78 m)
- Listed weight: 195 lb (88 kg)

Career information
- High school: Coral Springs Charter (Coral Springs, Florida)
- College: Independence (2016–2017); Washington State (2018–2021)
- NFL draft: 2022: undrafted

Career history
- New York Jets (2022)*; Miami Dolphins (2022)*; Hamilton Tiger-Cats (2023)*; Seattle Sea Dragons (2024)*; Arlington Renegades (2024)*
- * Offseason or practice squad member only

Awards and highlights
- Second-team All-Pac-12 (2021)

Calvin Jackson Jr. (born May 7, 1997) is an American professional football wide receiver. He played college football at Washington State. He also played for the Miami Dolphins and the New York Jets of the National Football League (NFL).

== College career ==
Jackson began his collegiate career at Independence Community College. While at Independence, he was featured in the third season of the Netflix documentary series Last Chance U where he played under head coach Jason Brown. As a freshman, he played in 9 games while having 49 catches for 649 yards, and 5 touchdowns. As a sophomore, Jackson played in 10 games while having 25 catches for 381 yards and 4 touchdowns. Jackson transferred to the Washington State following the season. At Washington State, Jackson played in over 31 games while having 104 receptions for 1,403 yards, and 10 touchdowns.

== Professional career ==
Pre-draft measurables
Height	Weight	Arm length	Hand span	40-yard dash	10-yard split	20-yard split	20-yard shuttle	Three-cone drill	Vertical jump	Broad jump	Bench press
5 ft 9 in (1.75 m)	193 lb (88 kg)	29 3/4 in (0.76 m)	9 1/8 in (0.23 m)	4.53 s	1.57 s	2.61 s	4.26 s	7.23 s	36 in (0.91 m)	10 ft 4 in (3.15 m)	13 reps
All values from Pro Day

=== New York Jets ===
After going undrafted in the 2022 NFL draft, Jackson signed with the New York Jets on May 4, 2022. He was released on August 24, 2022, but was re-signed to the practice squad two days later. He was released on September 6, 2022.

=== Miami Dolphins ===
On October 24, 2022, the Miami Dolphins signed Jackson to their practice squad. He was released on November 28, 2022. He was re-signed to the practice squad on December 30, 2022.

=== Hamilton Tiger-Cats ===
On May 21, 2023, Jackson was signed by the Hamilton Tiger-Cats of the Canadian Football League (CFL). He was released on June 4, 2024.

=== Seattle Sea Dragons ===
On October 25, 2023, Jackson signed with the Seattle Sea Dragons of the XFL. The Sea Dragons folded when the XFL and USFL merged to create the UFL, terminating his contract with the team.

=== Arlington Renegades ===
On January 16, 2024, Jackson was selected by the Arlington Renegades in the 2024 UFL dispersal draft. He was released on March 10, 2024.

== Personal life ==
Jackson is the son of former Dolphins DB Calvin Jackson, cousin of Arizona Cardinals WR Marquise Brown, and a stepchild of Tracey Jackson.
