= Mitchell Agude =

American gridiron football player (born 1999)

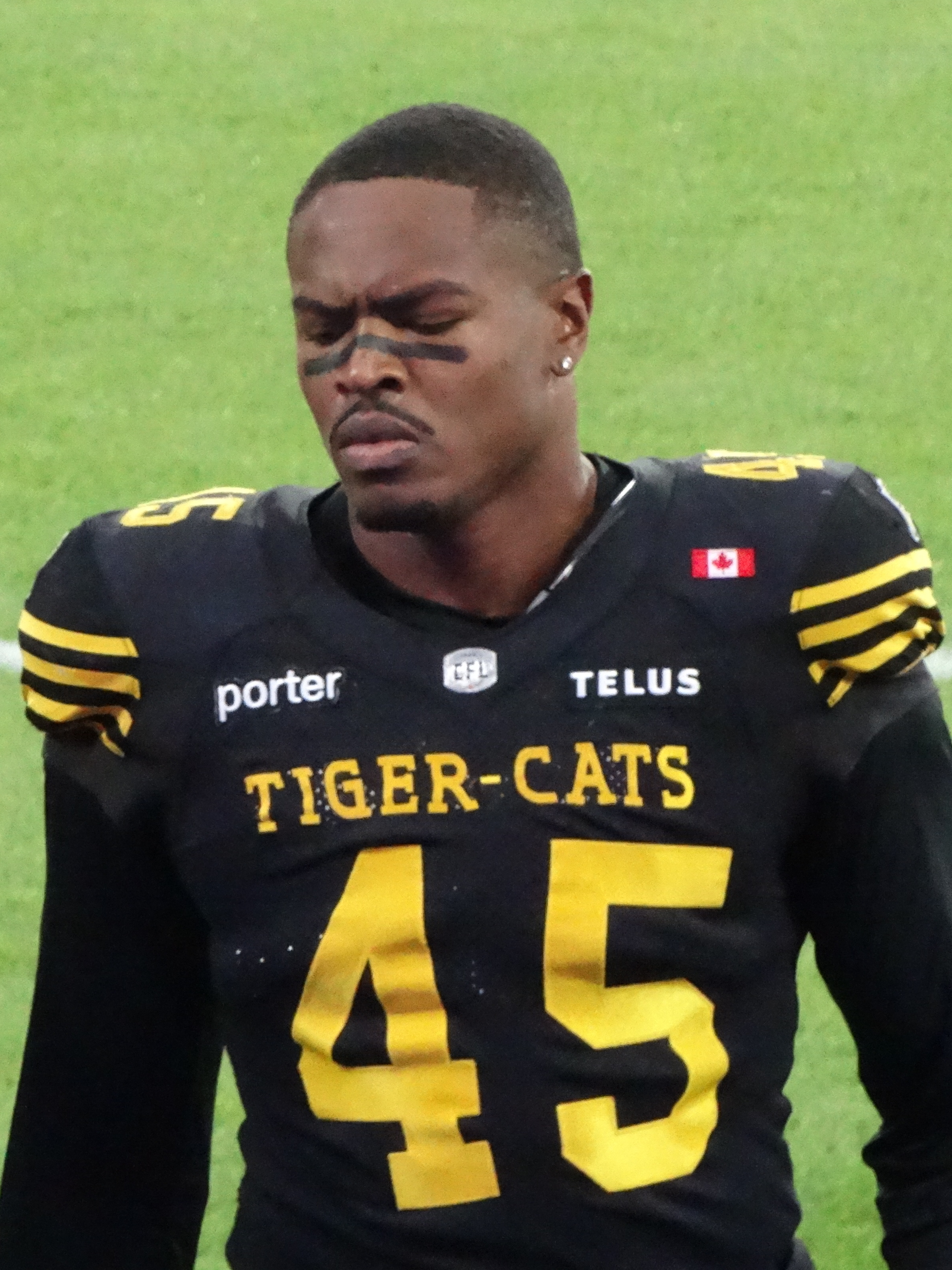
- Agude with the Hamilton Tiger-Cats in 2026

No. 45 – Hamilton Tiger-Cats
- Position: Defensive lineman
- Roster status: Active

Personal information
- Born: March 10, 1999 (age 27); Corona, California, U.S.
- Listed height: 6 ft 4 in (1.93 m)
- Listed weight: 262 lb (119 kg)

Career information
- High school: Santiago (Corona)
- College: Riverside (2018–2019); UCLA (2020–2021); Miami (FL) (2022)
- NFL draft: 2023: undrafted

Career history
- Miami Dolphins (2023)*; Detroit Lions (2023–2024); Houston Gamblers (2026)*; Hamilton Tiger-Cats (2026–present)
- * Offseason or practice squad member only

Awards and highlights
- Second-team All-Pac-12 (2021)

Career NFL statistics
- Total tackles: 3
- Forced fumbles: 1
- Stats at Pro Football Reference
- Stats at CFL.ca

Mitchell Chukwuebuka Agude (born March 10, 1999) is an American professional football defensive lineman for the Hamilton Tiger-Cats of the Canadian Football League (CFL). He played college football for the Riverside Tigers, the UCLA Bruins and the Miami Hurricanes.

== Early life ==
Agude was born on March 10, 1999, and grew up in Corona, California. He is of Nigerian descent. At age nine, Agude had a near-death experience when he fell off his skateboard and hit his head on a slab of concrete, going into a coma. At the hospital, doctors said that his brain was permanently damaged and that he would spend the rest of his life in a vegetative state. His mother prayed, and Agude, after having spent three days in a coma, woke up without any issues, leaving the hospital shortly afterwards under his own power.

Until graduating middle school, Agude played no organized sports under orders from the doctors, although at times he would sneak out of his house to play backyard football with his friends. He was allowed to play beginning in high school, and made the varsity at Santiago High School. At Santiago in 2016, Agude totaled 27 tackles and one interception. He entered Riverside City College following his time at Santiago.

== College career ==
Agude played two seasons for Riverside, compiling 67 tackles and five sacks in 20 games while playing linebacker. He was ranked a three-star junior college recruit and a top-ten junior college recruit nationally. He initially committed to play for the Maryland Terrapins, but was then told that his grades were not good enough to qualify. He was able to improve his grades and ultimately committed to play for the UCLA Bruins. In his first year at UCLA, Agude appeared in seven games, five as a starter, and recorded a team-leading nine tackles-for-loss. The following season, he played 12 games and started 10, being named an all-Pac-12 Conference selection with 54 tackles and 39 quarterback pressures. Agude transferred to Miami for a final season of college football in 2022. He totaled 39 tackles, seven tackles-for-loss and four sacks in his only year with the team.

== Professional career ==
Pre-draft measurables
Height	Weight	Arm length	Hand span	Wingspan	40-yard dash	10-yard split	20-yard split	20-yard shuttle	Three-cone drill	Vertical jump	Broad jump	Bench press
6 ft 3 7/8 in (1.93 m)	242 lb (110 kg)	34 in (0.86 m)	10 in (0.25 m)	6 ft 10 1/2 in (2.10 m)	4.75 s	1.69 s	2.76 s	4.27 s	7.46 s	35.0 in (0.89 m)	10 ft 1 in (3.07 m)	19 reps
All values from Pro Day

=== Miami Dolphins ===
After going unselected in the 2023 NFL draft, Agude was signed by the Miami Dolphins as an undrafted free agent. He was waived on August 28, as part of the final roster cuts.

=== Detroit Lions ===
On September 20, 2023, Agude was signed to the practice squad of the Detroit Lions. He signed a reserve/future contract on January 30, 2024.

Agude was waived by the Lions on August 27, 2024, and re-signed to the practice squad. He was promoted to the active roster on December 21.

On August 26, 2025, Agude was waived by the Lions as part of final roster cuts.

=== Houston Gamblers ===
On January 13, 2026, Agude was selected by the Houston Gamblers in the 2026 UFL Draft.

=== Hamilton Tiger-Cats ===
On May 8, 2026, Agude signed with the Hamilton Tiger-Cats.
