= Dohnovan West =

American football player (born 2001)

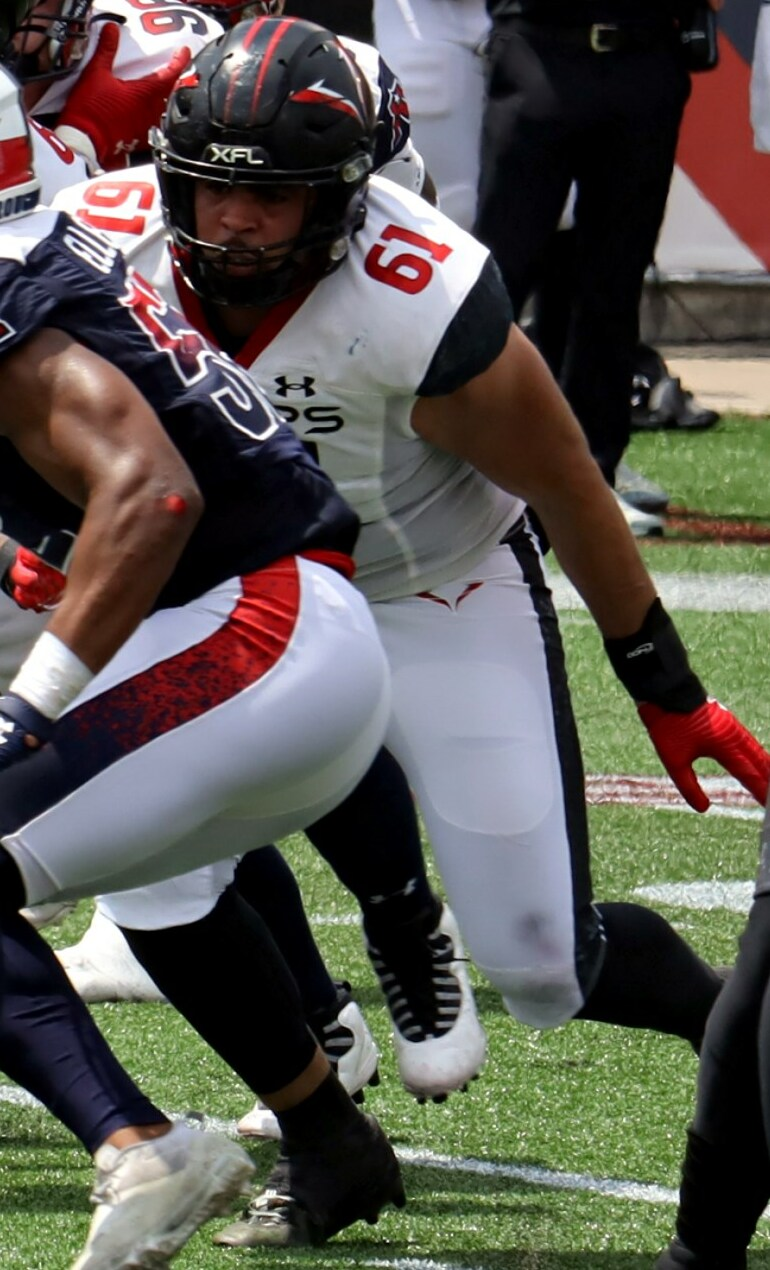
- West with the Vegas Vipers in 2023

No. 63 – Louisville Kings
- Position: Center
- Roster status: Active

Personal information
- Born: May 19, 2001 (age 25); Los Angeles, California, U.S.
- Listed height: 6 ft 3 in (1.91 m)
- Listed weight: 294 lb (133 kg)

Career information
- High school: Bishop Alemany
- College: Arizona State (2019–2021)
- NFL draft: 2022: undrafted

Career history
- San Francisco 49ers (2022)*; Vegas Vipers (2023); St. Louis Battlehawks (2024–2025); Arizona Cardinals (2025)*; Houston Gamblers (2026)*; Louisville Kings (2026–present)
- * Offseason or practice squad member only

Awards and highlights
- UFL champion (2026); Second-team All-Pac-12 (2021)
- Stats at Pro Football Reference

Dohnovan West (born May 19, 2001) is an American professional football center for the Louisville Kings of the United Football League (UFL). He played college football at Arizona State.

== Early life ==
West grew up in Mission Hills, California, and attended Bishop Alemany High School.

== College career ==
West was a member of the Arizona State Sun Devils for three seasons. He was named Arizona State's starting center during his freshman season. West was named second-team All-Pac-12 Conference as a junior. Following the end of the season, West announced that he would be forgoing his remaining collegiate eligibility and enter the 2022 NFL draft.

== Professional career ==
Pre-draft measurables
Height	Weight	Arm length	Hand span	Wingspan	40-yard dash	10-yard split	20-yard split	20-yard shuttle	Three-cone drill	Vertical jump	Broad jump	Bench press
6 ft 3 1/4 in (1.91 m)	296 lb (134 kg)	33 in (0.84 m)	9 1/2 in (0.24 m)	6 ft 6 in (1.98 m)	5.27 s	1.82 s	2.96 s	4.81 s	7.82 s	28.0 in (0.71 m)	9 ft 4 in (2.84 m)	21 reps
All values from NFL Combine/Pro Day

=== San Francisco 49ers ===
West signed with the San Francisco 49ers as an undrafted free agent on May 2, 2022. He was waived on August 29, 2022.

=== Vegas Vipers ===
West was selected by the Vegas Vipers in the 2023 XFL draft. The Vipers folded when the XFL and USFL merged to create the United Football League (UFL).

=== St. Louis Battlehawks ===
On January 5, 2024, West was selected by the St. Louis Battlehawks during the 2024 UFL dispersal draft. He signed with the team on January 30.

=== Arizona Cardinals ===
On August 20, 2025, West signed with the Arizona Cardinals, but was waived by the team five days later.

=== Dallas Renegades ===
On October 11, 2025, West signed with the Dallas Renegades of the United Football League (UFL).

=== Houston Gamblers ===
On January 13, 2026, West was selected by the Houston Gamblers in the 2026 UFL Draft. He was released on March 19.

=== Louisville Kings ===
On April 19, 2026, West signed with the Louisville Kings of the United Football League (UFL).
