= Sean Rhyan =

American football player (born 2000)

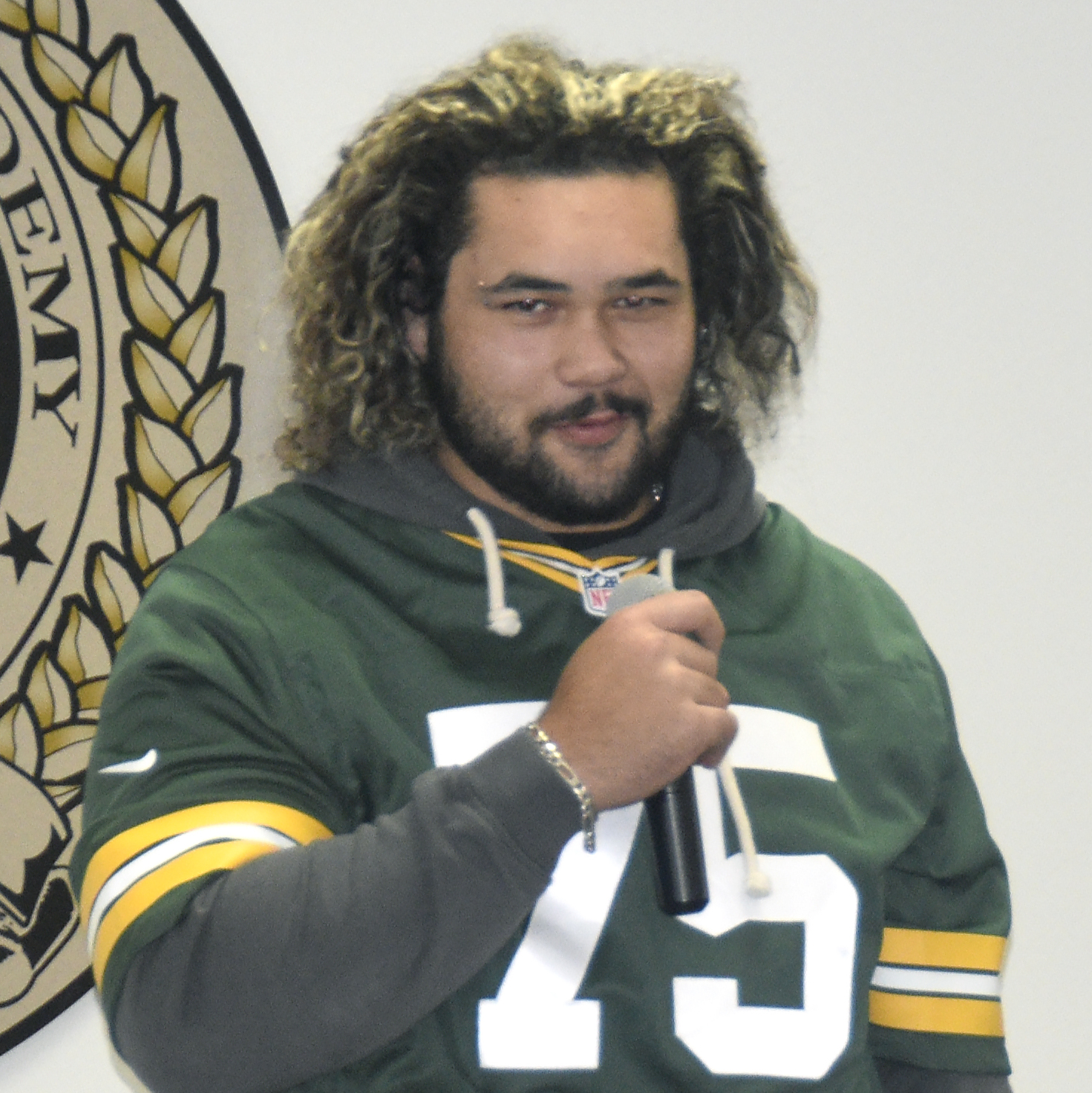
- Rhyan in 2022

No. 75 – Green Bay Packers
- Position: Center
- Roster status: Active

Personal information
- Born: September 15, 2000 (age 26); Laguna Hills, California, U.S.
- Listed height: 6 ft 5 in (1.96 m)
- Listed weight: 321 lb (146 kg)

Career information
- High school: San Juan Hills (San Juan Capistrano, California)
- College: UCLA (2019–2021)
- NFL draft: 2022: 3rd round, 92nd overall pick

Career history
- Green Bay Packers (2022–present)

Awards and highlights
- First-team All-Pac-12 (2021)

Career NFL statistics as of Week 10, 2026
- Games played: 54
- Games started: 35
- Stats at Pro Football Reference

Sean Michael Rhyan (born September 15, 2000) is an American professional football center for the Green Bay Packers of the National Football League (NFL). He played college football for the UCLA Bruins, where he was a standout offensive tackle. Rhyan was selected by the Packers in the third round, 92nd overall, of the 2022 NFL draft.

== Early life ==
Rhyan was born on September 15, 2000, in Laguna Hills, California, into a family with a strong athletic background. His father, Steve, was a professional motocross racer who turned pro at age 15, while his grandfather was a professional boxer. His mother, Mary Lou, was a multi-sport athlete at Walnut High School in Walnut, California.

Rhyan grew up in Ladera Ranch, California, where he primarily participated in baseball and rugby during his youth. Rugby was his main passion, and he was a fan of the All Blacks, particularly admiring player Sonny Bill Williams. Rhyan did not watch the NFL as a child and only began playing football during high school.

== High school career ==
Rhyan initially attended Capistrano Valley Christian School in San Juan Capistrano, California, as a freshman before transferring to San Juan Hills High School for his sophomore year. During this time, he was a nationally recognized rugby player who was part of the U.S. Olympic team pipeline, having qualified to play for the high school feeder team associated with the USA Eagles. As a senior, Rhyan was named the Orange County Register's Male Athlete of the Year and participated in the 2019 All-American Bowl. Additionally, he won the CIF Southern Section Division 1 title in the shot put.

Rhyan was rated a three-star recruit and the highest-ranked offensive lineman in California’s 2019 class by 247Sports. He committed to play college football at UCLA, selecting the Bruins over offers from Alabama, Arizona State, Notre Dame, South Carolina, USC.

== College career ==
Rhyan was named a starter at offensive tackle for the Bruins going into his freshman season. He started all 12 of UCLA's games and was named to the Freshman All-America Team by the Football Writers Association of America and USA Today.

Rhyan started all seven of the Bruins games in the team's COVID-19-shortened 2020 season.

== Professional career ==
Pre-draft measurables
Height	Weight	Arm length	Hand span	Wingspan	40-yard dash	10-yard split	20-yard split	20-yard shuttle	Three-cone drill	Vertical jump	Broad jump	Bench press
6 ft 4 5/8 in (1.95 m)	321 lb (146 kg)	32 3/8 in (0.82 m)	11 1/8 in (0.28 m)	6 ft 7 1/4 in (2.01 m)	5.25 s	1.79 s	2.98 s	4.60 s	7.55 s	34.5 in (0.88 m)	9 ft 2 in (2.79 m)	21 reps
All values from NFL Combine/Pro Day

Rhyan was selected by the Green Bay Packers in the third round (92nd overall) of the 2022 NFL draft. He signed his rookie contract on May 6, 2022. Rhyan saw his first NFL action on November 6, playing a single special teams snap in a Week 9 loss to the Detroit Lions. On November 25, Rhyan was suspended six games for violating the league's substance abuse policy, effectively ending his season. He appeared in 12 games in the 2023 season. Rhyan started in all 17 games in the 2024 season.

On March 11, 2026, Rhyan signed a three-year, $33 million contract extension with the Packers.

== Personal life ==
Rhyan is of Filipino descent through his mother, who immigrated to Walnut, California, from the Philippines at the age of five, and of White American descent through his father.
