= Luke Wattenberg =

American football player (born 1997)

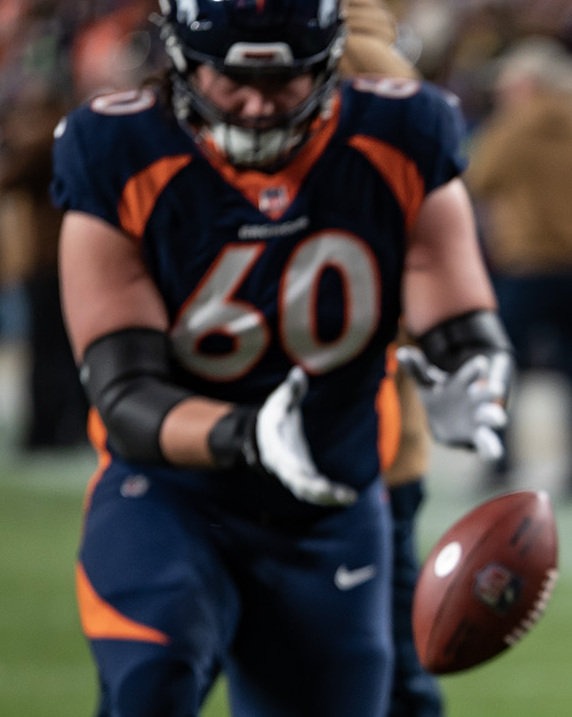
- Wattenberg with the Denver Broncos in 2023

No. 60 – Denver Broncos
- Position: Center
- Roster status: Active

Personal information
- Born: September 10, 1997 (age 29); Trabuco Canyon, California, U.S.
- Listed height: 6 ft 5 in (1.96 m)
- Listed weight: 300 lb (136 kg)

Career information
- High school: JSerra Catholic (San Juan Capistrano, California)
- College: Washington (2016–2021)
- NFL draft: 2022: 5th round, 171st overall pick

Career history
- Denver Broncos (2022–present)

Career NFL statistics as of Week 4, 2026
- Games played: 55
- Games started: 33
- Stats at Pro Football Reference

Luke Wattenberg (born September 10, 1997) is an American professional football center for the Denver Broncos of the National Football League (NFL). He played college football for the Washington Huskies and was selected by the Broncos in the fifth round of the 2022 NFL draft.

== College career ==
Wattenberg was ranked as a four–star recruit by 247Sports.com coming out of high school. He committed to Washington on April 15, 2015, over offers from USC, Utah, and Washington State. He graduated with a degree in civil engineering.

== Professional career ==
Pre-draft measurables
Height	Weight	Arm length	Hand span	Wingspan	40-yard dash	10-yard split	20-yard split	20-yard shuttle	Three-cone drill	Vertical jump	Broad jump
6 ft 4 in (1.93 m)	299 lb (136 kg)	34 1/8 in (0.87 m)	9 3/8 in (0.24 m)	6 ft 9 7/8 in (2.08 m)	5.20 s	1.72 s	2.94 s	4.57 s	7.45 s	29.5 in (0.75 m)	9 ft 5 in (2.87 m)
All values from NFL Combine

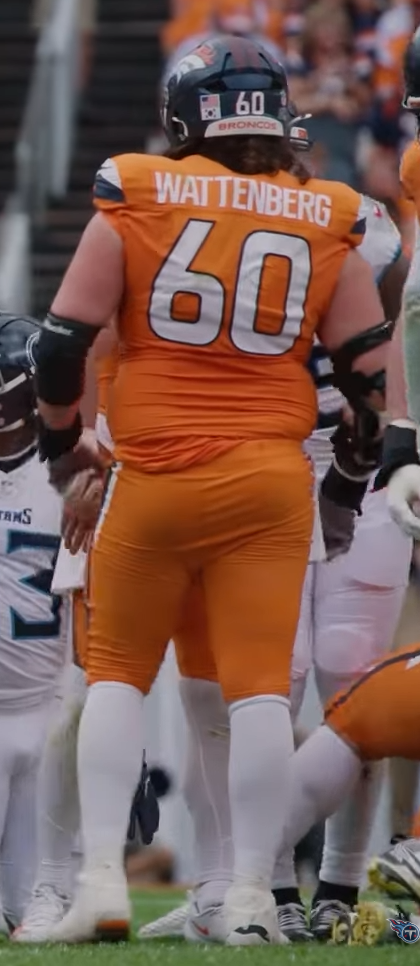
Wattenberg in 2025

Wattenberg was selected by the Denver Broncos with the 171st pick in the fifth round of the 2022 NFL draft.

After spending his first two seasons as a backup interior offensive lineman, Wattenberg became the Broncos' starting center ahead of the 2024 season after competing in training camp against Alex Forsyth and Sam Mustipher.

On October 12, 2024, Wattenberg was placed on injured reserve after suffering an ankle injury in Week 5 against the Las Vegas Raiders. He was activated on November 9.

On November 25, 2025, Wattenberg and the Broncos agreed to a four-year, $48 million contract extension. He started all 15 of his appearances for Denver during the regular season. On December 25, Wattenberg was placed on injured reserve after suffering a shoulder injury. He was activated on January 24, 2026, ahead of the AFC Championship Game against the New England Patriots.

== Personal life ==
Wattenberg was born in Trabuco Canyon, California to a father of Norwegian descent and a mother of Korean descent.
