= Thomas Booker =

American football player (born 1999)

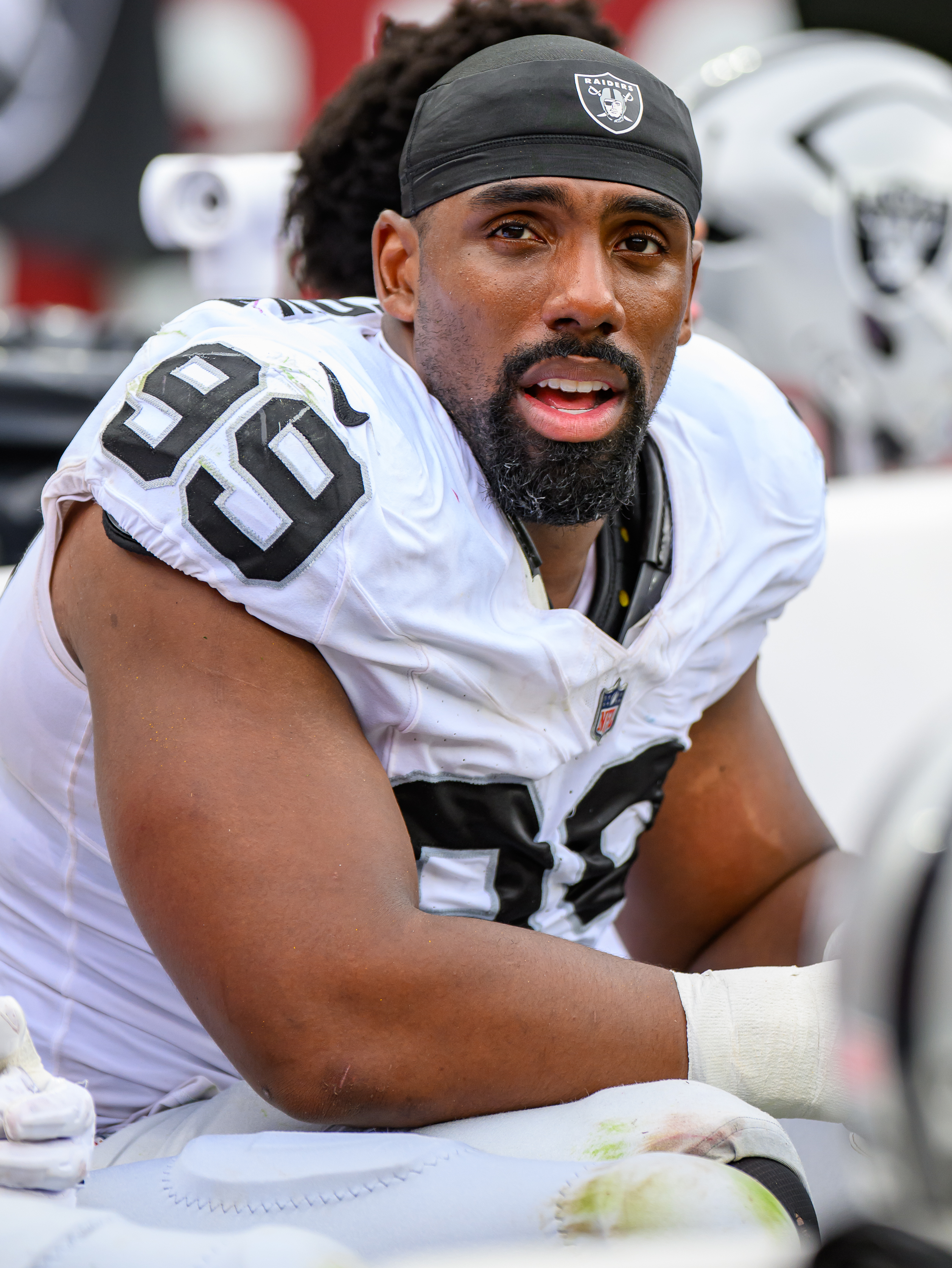
- Booker with the Las Vegas Raiders in 2025

No. 99 – Las Vegas Raiders
- Position: Defensive tackle
- Roster status: Active

Personal information
- Born: November 11, 1999 (age 26); Ellicott City, Maryland, U.S.
- Listed height: 6 ft 3 in (1.91 m)
- Listed weight: 301 lb (137 kg)

Career information
- High school: Gilman (Baltimore, Maryland)
- College: Stanford (2018–2021)
- NFL draft: 2022: 5th round, 150th overall pick

Career history
- Houston Texans (2022); Philadelphia Eagles (2023–2024); Las Vegas Raiders (2025–present)

Awards and highlights
- Super Bowl champion (LIX); 2× Second-team All-Pac-12 (2020, 2021)

Career NFL statistics as of 2025
- Total tackles: 77
- Sacks: 1.5
- Forced fumbles: 1
- Fumble recoveries: 1
- Pass deflections: 7
- Stats at Pro Football Reference

Earl Thomas Booker IV (born November 11, 1999) is an American professional football defensive tackle for the Las Vegas Raiders of the National Football League (NFL). He played college football for the Stanford Cardinal.

== College career ==
Booker was a four-star recruit coming out of Gilman School, having grown up in Ellicott City, Maryland. He was then a three-year starter for Stanford, playing in 43 games. In his final season he had 59 tackles and 1.5 sacks, totalling 159 tackles and 10 sacks for his career, along with 20.5 tackles for loss, two fumble recoveries, one forced fumble, and one interception. He was named to All-Pac-12 teams in each of his last 3 seasons and was a finalist for the William V. Campbell Trophy.

== Professional career ==
=== Pre-draft ===
Pre-draft measurables
Height	Weight	Arm length	Hand span	Wingspan	40-yard dash	10-yard split	20-yard split	20-yard shuttle	Three-cone drill	Broad jump	Bench press
6 ft 3 3/8 in (1.91 m)	301 lb (137 kg)	33 1/4 in (0.84 m)	10 5/8 in (0.27 m)	6 ft 7 7/8 in (2.03 m)	4.94 s	1.69 s	2.85 s	4.41 s	7.33 s	9 ft 2 in (2.79 m)	31 reps
All values from NFL Combine/Pro Day

In the run-up to the 2022 NFL draft Booker was seen as a high level developmental prospect, expected to play as a rotational defensive lineman.

=== Houston Texans ===
Booker was selected in the fifth round (150th overall) by the Houston Texans.

On August 29, 2023, Booker was waived by the Texans.

=== Philadelphia Eagles ===
On August 31, 2023, Booker was signed to the practice squad of the Philadelphia Eagles. He signed a reserve/future contract on January 18, 2024. He finished the 2024 season with 18 combined tackles and 1 sack, appearing in all 17 games. He won a Super Bowl championship when the Eagles defeated the Kansas City Chiefs 40–22 in Super Bowl LIX.

=== Las Vegas Raiders ===
On August 5, 2025, the Raiders acquired Booker from the Eagles in exchange for cornerback Jakorian Bennett.

On March 18, 2026, Booker re-signed with the Raiders on a one-year, $3.67 million contract.

== NFL career statistics ==
Legend
	Won the Super Bowl
**Bold**	Career high

=== Regular season ===
Year	Team	Games		Tackles					Interceptions						Fumbles				
Year	Team	GP	GS	Cmb	Solo	Ast	Sck	TFL	Int	Yds	Avg	Lng	TD	PD	FF	Fum	FR	Yds	TD
2022	HOU	10	1	15	11	4	0.5	1	0	0	0.0	0	0	1	0	0	0	0	0
2024	PHI	**17**	1	18	8	10	**1.0**	**2**	0	0	0.0	0	0	1	0	0	0	0	0
2025	LV	**17**	**13**	**44**	**16**	**28**	0.0	1	0	0	0.0	0	0	**5**	**1**	0	**1**	0	0
Career		44	15	77	35	42	1.5	4	0	0	0.0	0	0	7	1	0	1	0	0

=== Postseason ===
Year	Team	Games		Tackles					Interceptions						Fumbles				
Year	Team	GP	GS	Cmb	Solo	Ast	Sck	TFL	Int	Yds	Avg	Lng	TD	PD	FF	Fum	FR	Yds	TD
2024	PHI	4	0	0	0	0	0.0	0	0	0	0.0	0	0	0	0	0	0	0	0
Career		4	0	0	0	0	0.0	0	0	0	0.0	0	0	0	0	0	0	0	0

== Personal life ==
Booker and former teammate Cooper DeJean worked with local Philadelphia youth non-profit Leveling the Playing Field, an organization dedicated to redistributing sports equipment to under-resourced sports programs around the city. He is active in politics, having campaigned for Kamala Harris in the 2024 United States presidential election, as well having spoken at the White House about gun violence.
