= Devin Lloyd =

American football player (born 1998)

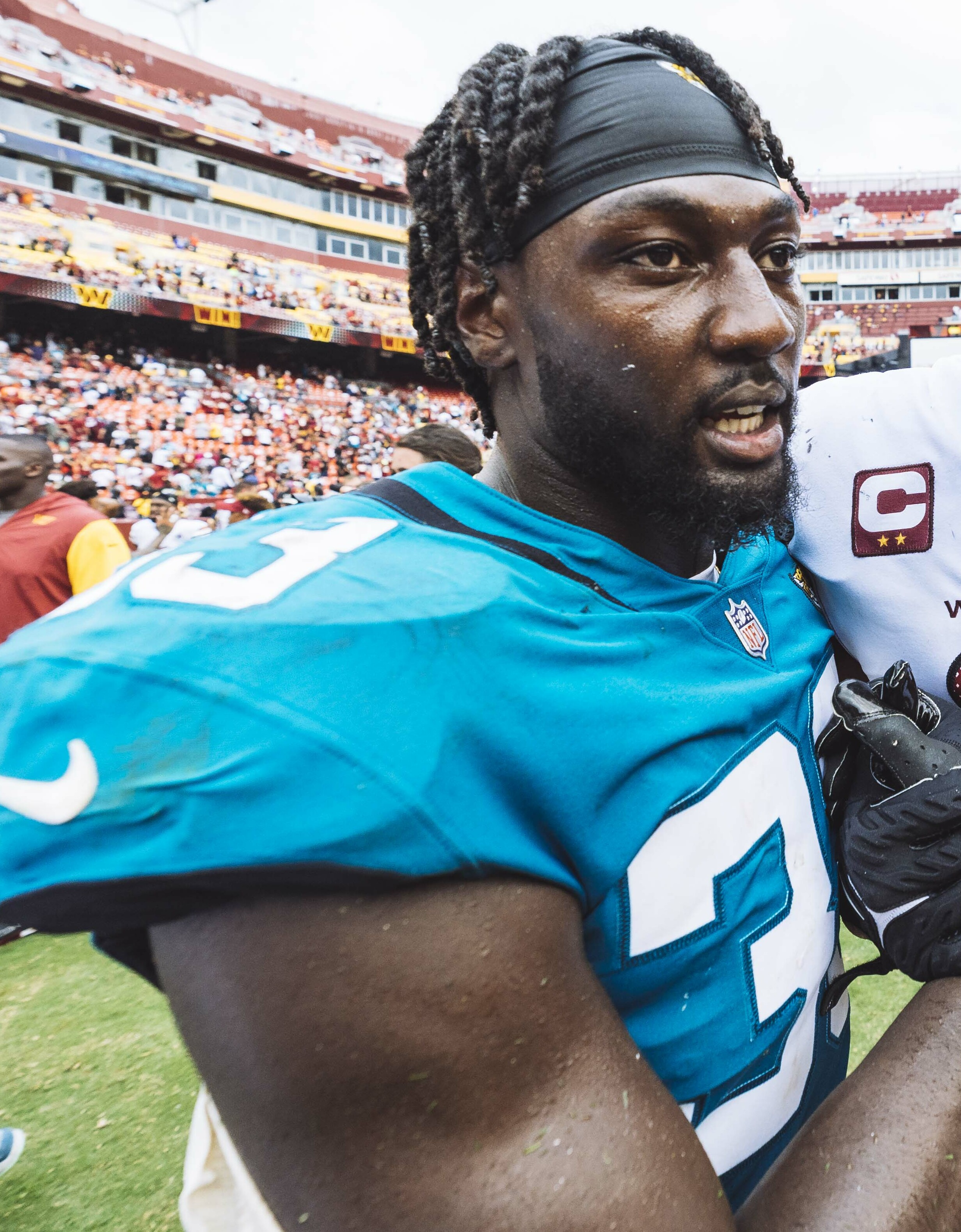
- Lloyd with Jacksonville Jaguars in 2022

No. 55 – Carolina Panthers
- Position: Linebacker
- Roster status: Active

Personal information
- Born: September 30, 1998 (age 28); Kansas City, Missouri, U.S.
- Listed height: 6 ft 3 in (1.91 m)
- Listed weight: 243 lb (110 kg)

Career information
- High school: Otay Ranch (Chula Vista, California)
- College: Utah (2017–2021)
- NFL draft: 2022: 1st round, 27th overall pick

Career history
- Jacksonville Jaguars (2022–2025); Carolina Panthers (2026–present)

Awards and highlights
- Second-team All-Pro (2025); Pro Bowl (2025); PFWA All-Rookie Team (2022); Consensus first-team All-American (2021); Pat Tillman Defensive Player of the Year (2021); 2× First-team All-Pac-12 (2020, 2021)

Career NFL statistics as of Week 10, 2026
- Total tackles: 499
- Sacks: 5.5
- Forced fumbles: 1
- Fumble recoveries: 5
- Pass deflections: 31
- Interceptions: 12
- Defensive touchdowns: 2
- Stats at Pro Football Reference

Devin Eric Lloyd (born September 30, 1998) is an American professional football linebacker for the Carolina Panthers of the National Football League (NFL). He played college football for the Utah Utes and was selected by the Jacksonville Jaguars in the first round of the 2022 NFL draft.

== Early life ==
Lloyd attended Otay Ranch High School in Chula Vista, California, where he played on the football team as a wide receiver, safety, and punter. As a senior, he caught 29 passes on offense, made eight interceptions on defense, and averaged 37.1 yards on 47 punts. In a win over Eastlake High School, he made four interceptions, returning two for touchdowns.

He was not highly recruited as three-star recruit when he committed to the University of Utah, his only Power Five offer, to play college football over offers from UNLV, Colorado State, Sacramento State, San Jose State, and Utah State.

== College career ==
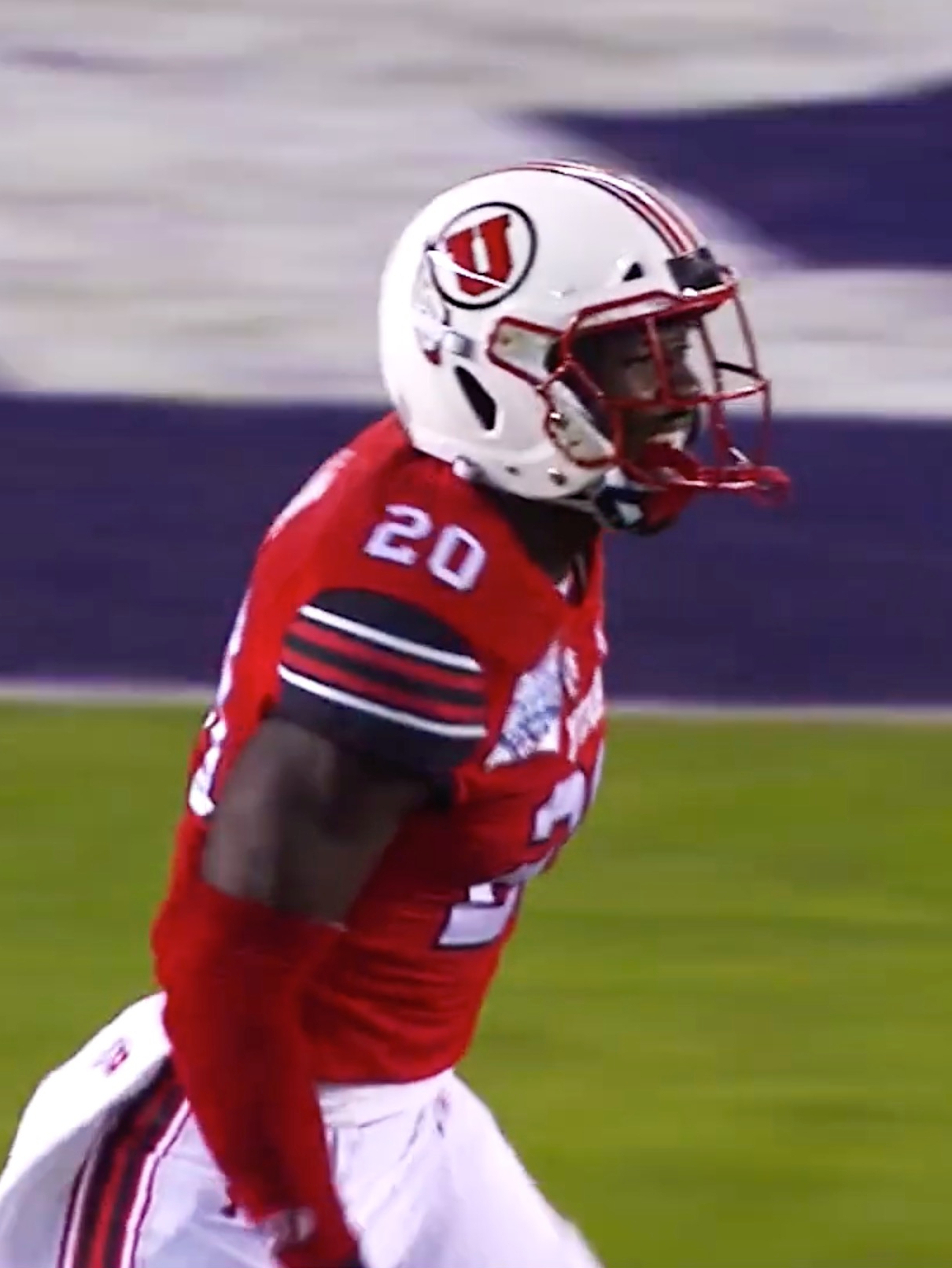
Lloyd with Utah in 2019.

After redshirting his first year at Utah in 2017, Lloyd played in all 14 games as a backup in 2018 and had six tackles. He became a starter in 2019. In 14 games he had 91 tackles, 6.5 sacks and one interception which he returned for a touchdown. As a junior in 2020, Lloyd played in five games and had 48 tackles and two sacks. He returned to Utah for his senior year in 2021 rather than entering the 2021 NFL draft. As a senior Lloyd played in all 14 games starting all but one, due to a controversial ejection vs Oregon State, and had 66 tackles, a Pac-12 leading eight sacks, and four interceptions including a pick-6 in the Pac-12 championship game. Lloyd also was First-team all Pac-12 and a consensus First-team All-American selection. On January 13, 2022, Lloyd declared for the 2022 NFL draft.

== Professional career ==
Pre-draft measurables
Height	Weight	Arm length	Hand span	Wingspan	40-yard dash	10-yard split	20-yard split	Vertical jump	Broad jump	Bench press
6 ft 2 3/4 in (1.90 m)	237 lb (108 kg)	33 in (0.84 m)	9 1/2 in (0.24 m)	6 ft 8 1/4 in (2.04 m)	4.66 s	1.58 s	2.71 s	35.0 in (0.89 m)	10 ft 6 in (3.20 m)	25 reps
All values from NFL Combine

=== Jacksonville Jaguars ===
Lloyd was selected in the first round with the 27th overall pick by the Jacksonville Jaguars in the 2022 NFL draft. Lloyd was named the Defensive Rookie of the Month for September. He recorded 24 tackles, six passes defended and two interceptions. He was named to the PFWA All-Rookie Team.

On April 30, 2025, the Jaguars declined the fifth-year option of Lloyd's contract, making him a free agent in 2026. In the 2025 season, Lloyd was named the AFC Defensive Player of Week in Week 4 after intercepting Brock Purdy twice en route to a 26–21 road victory over the San Francisco 49ers. He was also named AFC Player of the Month for September 2025. During Week 5, against the Kansas City Chiefs on Monday Night Football, Lloyd recorded his third interception in two games, intercepting Patrick Mahomes at the goal line and returning it 99 yards for his first career touchdown. The return set the record for the longest pick-six in Jaguars history and the longest by an NFL linebacker in a regular season game. The play ultimately ended up being the difference in the game as Jacksonville would go on to win 31–28.

=== Carolina Panthers ===
On March 11, 2026, Lloyd signed a three-year, $45 million deal with $25 million guaranteed with the Carolina Panthers. In Week 2 against the Atlanta Falcons, Lloyed posted nine tackles, two for loss, a sack, a QB hit, three pass breakups and two interceptions, including one returned for a 16-yard touchdown, earning him NFC Defensive Player of the Week.

== NFL career statistics ==
Legend
	Led the league
**Bold**	Career best

=== Regular season ===
Year	Team	Games		Tackles						Interceptions						Fumbles				
Year	Team	GP	GS	Cmb	Solo	Ast	TFL	Sck	Sfty	PD	Int	Yds	Y/I	Lng	TD	FF	FR	Yds	Y/R	TD
2022	JAX	17	15	115	59	**56**	0	0.0	0	**8**	3	42	14.0	19	0	0	**2**	**28**	**14.0**	0
2023	JAX	15	15	**127**	**75**	52	2	0.0	0	7	0	0	0	0.0	0	0	**2**	13	6.5	0
2024	JAX	16	16	113	61	52	**7**	**2.0**	0	4	1	3	3.0	3	0	**1**	0	0	0.0	0
2025	JAX	15	15	81	35	46	6	1.5	0	7	**5**	**135**	**27.0**	**99**	**1**	0	1	2	2.0	0
2026	CAR	8	8	63	37	26	4	2.0	0	4	3	110	36.7	53	1	0	0	0	0.0	0
Career		71	69	499	267	232	19	5.5	0	30	12	290	24.2	99	2	1	5	43	8.6	0

=== Postseason ===
Year	Team	Games		Tackles						Interceptions						Fumbles				
Year	Team	GP	GS	Cmb	Solo	Ast	TFL	Sck	Sfty	PD	Int	Yds	Y/I	Lng	TD	FF	FR	Yds	Y/R	TD
2022	JAX	2	2	**13**	**7**	**6**	**1**	0.0	0	**1**	0	—	—	—	—	0	0	—	—	—
2025	JAX	1	1	6	5	1	0	0.0	0	0	0	—	—	—	—	0	**1**	0	0.0	0
Career		3	2	19	12	7	1	0.0	0	1	0	—	—	—	—	0	1	0	0.0	0

== Personal life ==
Lloyd is the son of Joe Lloyd and Ronyta Johnson. Both of his parents served in the United States Navy. Lloyd is a Christian.
