= Edefuan Ulofoshio =

American football player (born 2000)

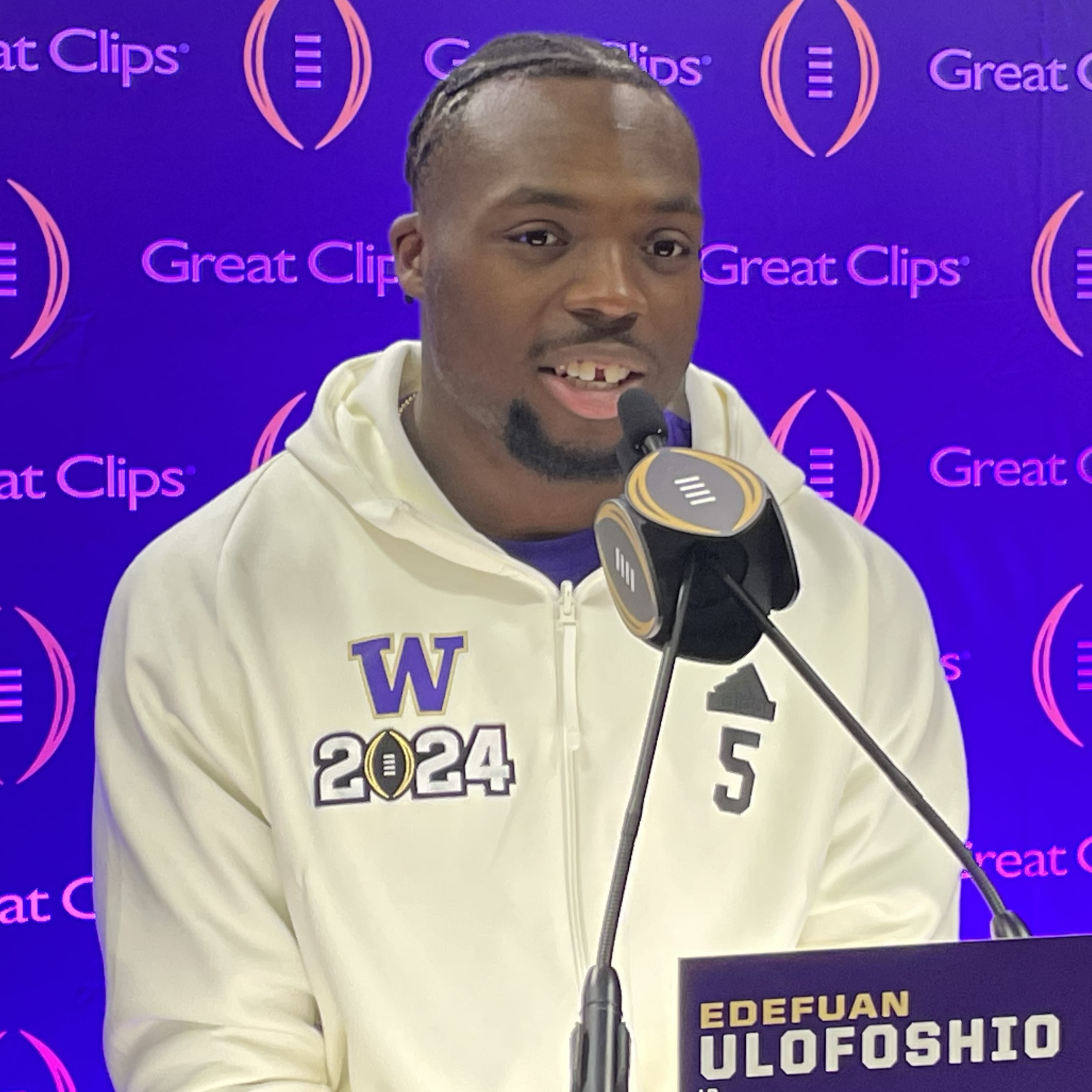
- Ulofoshio talking to press ahead of the 2024 CFP National Championship.

Profile
- Position: Linebacker

Personal information
- Born: January 23, 2000 (age 26); Anchorage, Alaska, U.S.
- Listed height: 6 ft 1 in (1.85 m)
- Listed weight: 240 lb (109 kg)

Career information
- High school: Bishop Gorman (Las Vegas, Nevada)
- College: Washington (2018–2023)
- NFL draft: 2024: 5th round, 160th overall pick

Career history
- Buffalo Bills (2024); Cleveland Browns (2025)*
- * Offseason or practice squad member only

Awards and highlights
- First-team All-Pac-12 (2023); Second-team All-Pac-12 (2020)

Career NFL statistics as of 2025
- Total tackles: 6
- Pass deflections: 1
- Stats at Pro Football Reference

Edefuan Ulofoshio (born January 23, 2000) is an American professional football linebacker for the Cleveland Browns of the National Football League (NFL). He played college football for the Washington Huskies.

== Early life ==
Ulofoshio grew up in Anchorage, Alaska, and attended South Anchorage High School before his family moved to Las Vegas, Nevada following his freshman year of high school. Ulofoshio had a stellar senior season at Bishop Gorman High School racking up 100 tackles with 15.5 going for a loss. Ulofoshio decided to walk-on to play for the Washington Huskies.

== College career ==
In Ulofoshio's first career play against the Oregon State Beavers, Ulofoshio forced a fumble on the opening kickoff. Ulofoshio finished his first career season in 2018 with two tackles and two forced fumbles. In week eleven of the 2019 season, Ulofoshio had a breakout game notching a team-leading nine tackles and a sack and a half in a 19–7 win over Oregon State and being named the Pac-12 defensive player of the week. Ulofoshio finished the 2019 season with 47 tackles with three and a half being for a loss, three sacks, and a forced fumble. In week one of the 2020 season, he recorded ten tackles, four pass deflections, and a fumble recovery, in a win over Oregon State. He finished the 2020 season with 47 tackles with one being for a loss, a sack, four pass deflections, two fumble recoveries, and a forced fumble. For his performance on the 2020 season he was named an honorable mention All American. He finished the 2021 season with 51 tackles with two and a half being for a loss, and a forced fumble. However, Ulofoshio missed 14 consecutive games spanning from the last six of 2021 and the first eight of 2022 with a season ending arm injury in 2021 and a torn ACL in 2022. In 2022 Ulofoshio only played in five games making just ten tackles. Ulofoshio opened the 2023 season by being named a team captain for the Huskies. In week four of the 2023 season, Ulofoshio recorded his first career interception and returned it for a touchdown, in a win over California. In the 2023 Pac-12 Football Championship Game, Ulofoshio recorded six tackles, as he helped the Huskies beat Oregon and win the Pac-12. For Ulofoshio's performance on the 2023 season he was named first-team all Pac-12, and second team All American. Ulofoshio was also named a semi-finalist of the Butkus Award.

== Professional career ==
Pre-draft measurables
Height	Weight	Arm length	Hand span	Wingspan	40-yard dash	10-yard split	20-yard split	20-yard shuttle	Three-cone drill	Vertical jump	Broad jump	Bench press
6 ft 0 1/2 in (1.84 m)	236 lb (107 kg)	32 7/8 in (0.84 m)	9 1/4 in (0.23 m)	6 ft 7 5/8 in (2.02 m)	4.56 s	1.59 s	2.65 s	4.33 s	7.69 s	39.5 in (1.00 m)	10 ft 8 in (3.25 m)	21 reps
All values from NFL Combine/Pro Day

=== Buffalo Bills ===
Ulofoshio was selected by the Buffalo Bills with the 160th overall pick in the fifth round in the 2024 NFL draft. The Bills acquired the 160th overall selection in a trade with the Green Bay Packers for the 91st overall pick.

On August 26, 2025, Ulofoshio was released by the Bills as part of final roster cuts.

=== Cleveland Browns ===
On August 28, 2025, Ulofoshio signed with the Cleveland Browns' practice squad. He was promoted to the active roster on January 3, 2026.

On August 30, 2026, Ulofoshio was waived with an injury designation by the Browns as a part of final roster cuts.

== Personal life ==
Ulofoshio is of Nigerian descent.
