= Qwuantrezz Knight =

American football player (born 1997)

Profile
- Position: Safety

Personal information
- Born: October 10, 1997 (age 29); Gretna, Florida, U.S.
- Listed height: 6 ft 0 in (1.83 m)
- Listed weight: 199 lb (90 kg)

Career information
- High school: East Gadsden (Havana, Florida)
- College: Maryland (2016–2018); Kent State (2019); UCLA (2020–2021)
- NFL draft: 2022: undrafted

Career history
- San Francisco 49ers (2022–2023)*; Arizona Cardinals (2023); Birmingham Stallions (2025)*; Hamilton Tiger-Cats (2025)*; Washington Commanders (2026)*
- * Offseason or practice squad member only

Awards and highlights
- Second-team All-Pac-12 (2021)
- Stats at Pro Football Reference

Qwuantrezz Knight (born October 10, 1997) is an American professional football safety. Knight played college football for the Maryland Terrapins, Kent State Golden Flashes, and UCLA Bruins.

== Early life ==
Knight attended East Gadsden High School. Knight would initially decide to commit to play college football at Eastern Michigan but would flip his commitment to Maryland.

== College career ==
=== Maryland ===
In Knight's first career season in 2016, he finished the year with 27 tackles with 0.5 tackle going for a loss. In the 2017 season, Knight recorded ten tackles. In the 2018 season Knight only appeared in two games where he had four tackles with one being for a loss. After the conclusion of the 2019 season, Knight would decide to enter his named into the NCAA transfer portal.

=== Kent State ===
Knight would decide to transfer to continue his career at Kent State. Knight was initially denied eligilbility at Kent State but would later be granted eligilbility by the NCAA in late July.

=== UCLA ===
In the 2021 season Knight had a career year, notching 65 tackles with 8.5 going for a loss, 2.5 sacks, three pass deflections, and a forced fumble. For his performance on the season, Knight was named second-team All-Pac-12 Conference.

== Professional career ==
Pre-draft measurables
Height	Weight	Arm length	Hand span	Wingspan	40-yard dash	10-yard split	20-yard split	20-yard shuttle	Three-cone drill	Vertical jump	Broad jump
5 ft 10 3/4 in (1.80 m)	195 lb (88 kg)	29 3/4 in (0.76 m)	9 7/8 in (0.25 m)	6 ft 0 1/4 in (1.84 m)	4.61 s	1.60 s	2.65 s	4.22 s	7.11 s	34.0 in (0.86 m)	9 ft 8 in (2.95 m)
All values from Pro Day

=== San Francisco 49ers ===
Knight signed with the San Francisco 49ers as an undrafted free agent on May 13, 2022. On August 30, he was waived by the 49ers as part of final roster cuts and re-signed to the practice squad the following day. Knight signed a reserve/future contract with San Francisco on January 31, 2023.

On August 29, 2023, Knight was waived by the 49ers as part of final roster cuts and re-signed to the practice squad the following day.

=== Arizona Cardinals ===
On September 18, 2023, Knight was signed by the Arizona Cardinals off of the 49ers' practice squad. He was released on November 18 and re-signed three days later. Knight was released on March 21, 2024.

=== Birmingham Stallions ===
On September 24, 2024, Knight signed with the Birmingham Stallions of the United Football League (UFL). He was released by the Stallions on March 20, 2025.

=== Hamilton Tiger-Cats ===
On April 8, 2025, Knight signed with the Hamilton Tiger-Cats. On June 1, he was released as part of final roster cuts.

On September 11, 2025, the NFL issued Knight a three-game suspension.

=== Washington Commanders ===
On January 22, 2026, Knight signed a futures contract with the Washington Commanders. On August 29, he was released by the Commanders as a part of final roster cuts before the start of the regular season.
