= Abraham Lucas =

American football player (born 1998)

No. 72 – Seattle Seahawks
- Position: Offensive tackle
- Roster status: Active

Personal information
- Born: October 25, 1998 (age 28); Everett, Washington, U.S.
- Listed height: 6 ft 6 in (1.98 m)
- Listed weight: 322 lb (146 kg)

Career information
- High school: Archbishop Murphy (Everett)
- College: Washington State (2017–2021)
- NFL draft: 2022: 3rd round, 72nd overall pick

Career history
- Seattle Seahawks (2022–present)

Awards and highlights
- Super Bowl champion (LX); First-team All-Pac-12 (2021); 3× Second-team All-Pac-12 (2018–2020)

Career NFL statistics as of Week 6, 2026
- Games played: 52
- Games started: 52
- Stats at Pro Football Reference

Abraham "Abe" Lucas (born October 25, 1998) is an American professional football offensive tackle for the Seattle Seahawks of the National Football League (NFL). He played college football for the Washington State Cougars.

== Early life ==
Lucas grew up in Everett, Washington and attended Archbishop Murphy High School, where he played basketball and was an offensive and defensive lineman on the football team. Kyler Gordon from the Chicago Bears was also a high school teammate of Lucas. Lucas was rated a three-star recruit and committed to play college football at Washington State over offers from Oregon State and Wyoming.

== College career ==
Lucas redshirted his true freshman season at Washington State. He was named the Cougars' starting right tackle going into his redshirt freshman season. Lucas started all 13 of Washington State's games and was named second-team All-Pac-12 Conference and a freshman All-American by USA Today. He started all of Washington State's games at right tackle as a redshirt sophomore and was again named second-team All-Pac-12. Lucas started all four games of Washington State's COVID-19-shortened 2020 season and was named second-team All-Conference for a third straight season and was also named first-team All-Pac-12 by the Associated Press. He considered entering the 2021 NFL draft, but opted to return to Washington State for a fifth season. As a redshirt senior, Lucas started 12 games at right tackle and was named first-team All-Pac-12.

== Professional career ==
Throughout the draft process, Lucas was deemed a top overall blocker, specifically in the passing game. He ran a 4.92 s 40-yard dash time, near the top of the offensive line draft class, and played over 2,195 pass-blocking snaps at Washington State University while earning an elite 91+ Pro Football Focus pass blocking grade.

Pre-draft measurables
Height	Weight	Arm length	Hand span	Wingspan	40-yard dash	10-yard split	20-yard split	20-yard shuttle	Three-cone drill	Vertical jump	Broad jump	Bench press
6 ft 6 3/8 in (1.99 m)	315 lb (143 kg)	33 7/8 in (0.86 m)	10 1/2 in (0.27 m)	6 ft 9 3/4 in (2.08 m)	4.92 s	1.76 s	2.84 s	4.40 s	7.25 s	29.0 in (0.74 m)	9 ft 5 in (2.87 m)	24 reps
All values from NFL Combine/Pro Day

=== Seattle Seahawks ===
The Seattle Seahawks selected Lucas in the third round (72nd overall) in the 2022 NFL draft. He signed his rookie contract on May 26, 2022. Lucas was named starting right tackle as a rookie, starting in 16 games.

In Week 1 of the 2023 season, Lucas suffered a knee injury and was placed on injured reserve. Lucas was activated off of injured reserve on November 30. He appeared in and started six games in the 2023 season.

On July 18, 2024, Lucas was placed on the active/physically unable to perform (PUP) list, and was placed on reserves to begin the season. He was activated on November 13. He appeared in and started seven games in the 2024 season.

On September 4, 2025, Lucas was signed to a three-year, $46 million extension. He started in Super Bowl LX, a 29–13 win over the New England Patriots.

== Personal life ==
Lucas is Catholic.
