= Verone McKinley III =

American football player (born 2000)

Profile
- Position: Safety

Personal information
- Born: June 29, 2000 (age 26); Carrollton, Texas, U.S.
- Listed height: 5 ft 10 in (1.78 m)
- Listed weight: 195 lb (88 kg)

Career information
- High school: Hebron (Carrollton)
- College: Oregon (2018–2021)
- NFL draft: 2022: undrafted

Career history
- Miami Dolphins (2022–2023); Arizona Cardinals (2023–2024)*
- * Offseason or practice squad member only

Awards and highlights
- Consensus All-American (2021); First-team All-Pac-12 (2021); Freshman All-American (2019)

Career NFL statistics as of 2023
- Total tackles: 16
- Pass deflections: 1
- Interceptions: 1
- Stats at Pro Football Reference

Verone McKinley III (born June 29, 2000) is an American professional football safety. He played college football at Oregon.

== Early life ==
McKinley attended Hebron High School in Carrollton, Texas. He committed to the University of Oregon to play college football.

== College career ==
As a true freshman at Oregon in 2018, McKinley played in three games before taking a redshirt. As a redshirt freshman in 2019, he started 11 of 14 games, recording 46 tackles and four interceptions. In 2020, he started six of seven games and had 46 tackles and one interception. McKinley 2021 season at Oregon he earned first-team consensus All-American and first-team All-Pac-12 Conference honors as a junior in 2021. He started all 14 games that seasons, recording 78 tackles (44 solo), six interceptions, 12 passes defensed and one forced fumble. In McKinley's collegiate career, he recorded 11 interceptions in 38 games. McKinley was a three-year starter (2019–2021). He was named a finalist for the Jim Thorpe Award.

== Professional career ==
Pre-draft measurables
Height	Weight	Arm length	Hand span	Wingspan	40-yard dash	10-yard split	20-yard split	20-yard shuttle	Three-cone drill	Vertical jump	Broad jump	Bench press
5 ft 10 in (1.78 m)	198 lb (90 kg)	30 5/8 in (0.78 m)	9 1/8 in (0.23 m)	6 ft 0 3/4 in (1.85 m)	4.65 s	1.69 s	2.70 s	4.38 s	7.12 s	35.0 in (0.89 m)	10 ft 0 in (3.05 m)	16 reps
All values from NFL Combine/Pro Day

=== Miami Dolphins ===
McKinley signed with the Miami Dolphins as an undrafted free agent on May 13, 2022. He was waived by the Dolphins on August 30, 2022, and re-signed to the practice squad. He was promoted to the active roster on November 12. On November 27, he recorded his first career interception in a 30–15 win over the Houston Texans.

On September 16, 2023, McKinley was waived by the Dolphins and re-signed to the practice squad. He was released on December 6.

=== Arizona Cardinals ===
On January 3, 2024, McKinley was signed to the Arizona Cardinals practice squad. He was waived on August 26.
