= Alex Forsyth (American football) =

American football player (born 1999)

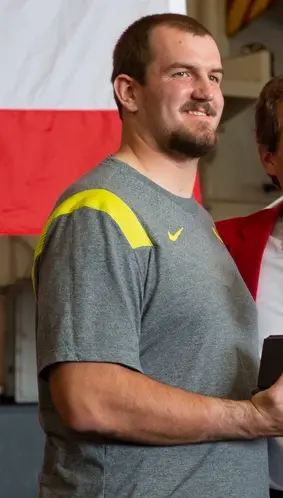
- Forsyth in 2022

No. 54 – Denver Broncos
- Position: Center
- Roster status: Active

Personal information
- Born: February 13, 1999 (age 27); West Linn, Oregon, U.S.
- Listed height: 6 ft 4 in (1.93 m)
- Listed weight: 312 lb (142 kg)

Career information
- High school: West Linn
- College: Oregon (2017–2022)
- NFL draft: 2023: 7th round, 257th overall pick

Career history
- Denver Broncos (2023–present)

Awards and highlights
- First-team All-Pac-12 (2022); Second-team All-Pac-12 (2021)

Career NFL statistics as of 2025
- Games played: 34
- Games started: 6
- Stats at Pro Football Reference

Alexander Forsyth (born February 13, 1999) is an American professional football center for the Denver Broncos of the National Football League (NFL). He played college football for the Oregon Ducks.

== Early life ==
Forsyth was born on February 13, 1999, in West Linn, Oregon. He played football at West Linn High School, where he was named first-team all-state as a junior and senior. A three-star recruit, Forsyth committed to play college football at Oregon.

== College career ==
Forsyth redshirted his first year at Oregon in 2017. He appeared in five games in both of the following seasons, seeing action at right guard, right tackle and left guard. He became a full-time starter in 2020, starting at center all seven games in the COVID-19 pandemic-shortened season. He led the offense in snaps and only allowed one sack, while being named second-team all-conference.

In 2021, Forsyth appeared in 10 of 14 games, starting nine at center while earning second-team all-conference honors again. After being given an extra year of eligibility due to the COVID-19 pandemic, he opted to return to Oregon in 2022. In his final year, he rated as the second-best pass blocking center nationally according to PFF's rankings, and was named a second-team All-America selection.

== Professional career ==
Pre-draft measurables
Height	Weight	Arm length	Hand span	Wingspan	Vertical jump	Broad jump	Bench press
6 ft 3 7/8 in (1.93 m)	303 lb (137 kg)	32 3/4 in (0.83 m)	10 1/4 in (0.26 m)	6 ft 9 3/8 in (2.07 m)	20.5 in (0.52 m)	7 ft 11 in (2.41 m)	29 reps
All values from NFL Combine

Forsyth participated in the 2023 NFL Combine. He was selected by the Denver Broncos in the seventh round with the 257th overall pick in the 2023 NFL draft.

Forsyth made his first NFL start during Week 6 of the 2024 season in a game against the Los Angeles Chargers.

== Personal life ==
Forsyth's father Steve was killed during the Clackamas Town Center shooting in 2012.
