= 2021 Oregon State Beavers football team =

American college football season

2021 Oregon State Beavers football

LA Bowl, L 13–24 vs. Utah State
- Conference: Pac-12 Conference
- North Division
- Record: 7–6 (5–4 Pac-12)
- Head coach: Jonathan Smith (4th season)
- Offensive coordinator: Brian Lindgren (4th season)
- Offensive scheme: Spread
- Defensive coordinator: Tim Tibesar (4th season)
- Base defense: Multiple 4–2–5
- Home stadium: Reser Stadium

2021 Pac-12 Conference football standings
	Conf.			Overall
Team	W		L	W		L
North Division
No. 22 Oregon xy	7	–	2	10	–	4
Washington State	6	–	3	7	–	6
Oregon State	5	–	4	7	–	6
California	4	–	5	5	–	7
Washington	3	–	6	4	–	8
Stanford	2	–	7	3	–	9
South Division
No. 12 Utah xy$	8	–	1	10	–	4
UCLA	6	–	3	8	–	4
Arizona State†	0	–	3	0	–	5
USC	3	–	6	4	–	8
Colorado	3	–	6	4	–	8
Arizona	1	–	8	1	–	11
Championship: Utah 38, Oregon 10
$ – Conference champion; x – Division champion/co-champions; y – Championship game participant; Rankings from AP Poll

The 2021 Oregon State Beavers football team represented Oregon State University during the 2021 NCAA Division I FBS football season. They were led by fourth-year head coach Jonathan Smith. The team played their home games on campus at Reser Stadium in Corvallis, Oregon, as a member of the North Division of the Pac-12 Conference.

Defensive Coordinator Tim Tibesar's contract was terminated on November 7, the day after their 37–34 loss to Colorado.

== Schedule ==
Date	Time	Opponent	Site	TV	Result	Attendance
September 4	4:00 p.m.	at Purdue*	Ross–Ade Stadium; West Lafayette, IN	FS1	L 21–30	57,282
September 11	8:00 p.m.	Hawaii*	Reser Stadium; Corvallis, OR	FS1	W 45–27	27,701
September 18	12:30 p.m.	Idaho*	Reser Stadium; Corvallis, OR	P12N	W 42–0	26,797
September 25	7:30 p.m.	at USC	Los Angeles Memorial Coliseum; Los Angeles, CA	FS1	W 45–27	51,564
October 2	6:00 p.m.	Washington	Reser Stadium; Corvallis, OR	P12N	W 27–24	33,733
October 9	1:00 p.m.	at Washington State	Martin Stadium; Pullman, WA	P12N	L 24–31	24,157
October 23	4:30 p.m.	Utah	Reser Stadium; Corvallis, OR	P12N	W 42–34	30,203
October 30	4:00 p.m.	at California	California Memorial Stadium; Berkeley, CA	P12N	L 25–39	38,572
November 6	4:00 p.m.	at Colorado	Folsom Field; Boulder, CO	P12N	L 34–37 ^{2OT}	47,984
November 13	2:30 p.m.	Stanford	Reser Stadium; Corvallis, OR	P12N	W 35–14	35,129
November 20	7:30 p.m.	Arizona State	Reser Stadium; Corvallis, OR	ESPN	W 24–10	29,579
November 27	12:30 p.m.	at No. 11 Oregon	Autzen Stadium; Eugene, OR (rivalry)	ESPN	L 29–38	56,408
December 18	4:30 p.m.	vs. Utah State*	SoFi Stadium; Inglewood, CA (LA Bowl)	ABC	L 13–24	29,896
*Non-conference game; Rankings from AP Poll and CFP Rankings after November 2 released prior to game; All times are in Pacific time

== Rankings ==
Ranking movements Legend: ██ Increase in ranking ██ Decrease in ranking — = Not ranked RV = Received votes
	Week															
Poll	Pre	1	2	3	4	5	6	7	8	9	10	11	12	13	14	Final
AP	—	—	—	—	RV	RV	—	—	RV	—	—	—	—			
Coaches	—	—	—	—	RV	RV	—	—	RV	—	—	—	RV			
CFP	Not released									—	—	—				Not released

== Game summaries ==
=== At Purdue ===
Oregon State Beavers (0–0) at Purdue Boilermakers (0–0)

Quarter	1	2	3	4	Total
Oregon St	7	0	0	14	21
Purdue	7	6	3	14	30

at Ross–Ade Stadium, West Lafayette, Indiana

- Date: September 4, 2021
- Game time: 7:15 p.m. CDT
- Game weather: Sunny, 68 °F (20 °C)
- Game attendance: 53,656
- Referee: Mark Kluczynski
- TV announcers (FS1): Cory Provus and Robert Smith
- Box Score

Game information

First quarter

- OSU – B.J. Baylor 9-yard run (Everett Hayes kick), 10:10. Oregon St 7–0. Drive: 3 plays, 64 yards, 1:05.
- PUR – Zander Horvath 11-yard run (Mitchell Finneran kick), 3:43. Tie 7–7. Drive: 4 plays, 45 yards, 1:45.

Second quarter

- PUR – Mitchell Finneran 49-yard field goal, 8:19. Purdue 10–7. Drive: 8 plays, 47 yards, 3:24.
- PUR – Mitchell Finneran 40-yard field goal, 0:06. Purdue 13–7. Drive: 10 plays, 32 yards, 2:14.

Third quarter

- PUR – Mitchell Finneran 23-yard field goal, 1:19. Purdue 16–7. Drive: 10 plays, 42 yards, 5:41.

Fourth quarter

- OSU – Tyjon Lindsay 7-yard run (Everett Hayes kick), 13:05. Purdue 16–14. Drive: 7 plays, 75 yards, 3:14.
- PUR – Payne Durham 5-yard pass from Jack Plummer (Mitchell Finneran kick), 4:56. Purdue 23–14. Drive: 6 plays, 37 yards, 3:20.
- OSU – B. J. Baylor 2-yard run (Everett Hayes kick), 3:13. Purdue 23–21. Drive: 7 plays, 75 yards, 1:43.
- PUR – Payne Durham 50-yard pass from Jack Plummer (Mitchell Finneran kick), 2:09. Purdue 30–21. Drive: 4 plays, 75 yards, 1:04.

Top passers

- OSU – Chance Nolan – 10/16, 157 yards
- PUR – Jack Plummer – 29/41, 313 yards, 2 TD

Top rushers

- OSU – Trey Lowe – 6 rushes, 27 yards
- PUR – Zander Horvath – 21 rushes, 81 yards, TD

Top receivers

- OSU – Trevon Bradford – 5 receptions, 75 yards
- PUR – David Bell – 8 receptions, 134 yards

External videos
- Game highlights (Big Ten Network)

=== vs Hawaii ===
Hawaii Rainbow Warriors vs Oregon State Beavers – Game summary

Quarter	1	2	3	4	Total
Rainbow Warriors	0	7	13	7	27
Beavers	21	3	7	14	45

at Reser Stadium • Corvallis, OR

- Date: September 11, 2021
- Game time: 8:00 p.m. PDT
- Game attendance: 27,701
- Referee: Steve Baron
- TV announcers (FS1): Alex Faust, Petros Papadakis

Game information

First quarter

- OSU – Jack Colletto 2 Yd Run (Everett Hayes Kick), 10:43. Oregon State 7–0. Drive: 10 plays, 65 yards, 4:17.
- OSU – B. J. Baylor 66 Yd Run (Everett Hayes Kick), 7:04. Oregon State 14–0. Drive: 3 plays, 80 yards, 1:09.
- OSU – Zeriah Beason 6 Yd pass from Chance Nolan (Everett Hayes Kick), 0:22. Oregon State 21–0. Drive: 10 plays, 64 yards, 5:21.

Second quarter

- HAW – Calvin Turner 12 Yd pass from Chevan Cordeiro (Matthew Shipley Kick), 10:30. Oregon State 21–7. Drive: 12 plays, 75 yards, 4:52.
- OSU – Everett Hayes 27 Yd Field Goal, 5:03. Oregon State 24–7. Drive: 10 plays, 68 yards, 5:22.

Third quarter

- OSU – B. J. Baylor 30 Yd Run (Everett Hayes Kick), 14:46. Oregon State 31–7. Drive: 1 plays, 30 yards, 0:08.
- HAW – Calvin Turner 1 Yd Run (Two-Point Pass Conversion Failed), 6:45. Oregon State 31–13. Drive: 9 plays, 90 yards, 3:37.
- HAW – Nick Mardner 10 Yd pass from Chevan Cordeiro (Matthew Shipley Kick), 3:46. Oregon State 31–20. Drive: 4 plays, 46 yards, 2:04.

Fourth quarter

- OSU – Anthony Gould 13 Yd pass from Chance Nolan (Everett Hayes Kick), 14:54. Oregon State 38–20. Drive: 8 plays, 77 yards, 3:44.
- HAW – Calvin Turner 3 Yd Run (Matthew Shipley Kick), 10:28. Oregon State 38–27. Drive: 12 plays, 75 yards, 4:26.
- OSU – B. J. Baylor 1 Yd Run (Everett Hayes Kick), 3:12. Oregon State 45–27. Drive: 15 plays, 90 yards, 7:10.

Top passers

- HAW – Chevan Cordeiro – 24/49, 366 yards, 2 TD, 2 INT
- OSU – Chance Nolan – 21/29, 302 yards, 2 TD

Top rushers

- HAW – Chevan Cordeiro – 13 rushes, 48 yards
- OSU – B. J. Baylor – 18 rushes, 171 yards, 3 TD

Top receivers

- HAW – Nick Mardner – 6 receptions, 110 yards, TD
- OSU – Anthony Gould – 7 receptions, 119 yards, TD

=== vs Idaho ===
Idaho Vandals vs Oregon State Beavers – Game summary

Quarter	1	2	3	4	Total
Vandals	0	0	0	0	0
Beavers	14	14	14	0	42

at Reser Stadium • Corvallis, OR

- Date: September 18, 2021
- Game time: 12:30 p.m. PDT
- Game weather: 61 °F (16 °C); Rain
- Game attendance: 26,797
- Referee: Michael Mothershed
- TV announcers (P12N): Rich Burk (play-by-play), Nigel Burton (analyst)

Game information

First quarter

- OSU – Tyjon Lindsey 18 Yd pass from Chance Nolan (Everett Hayes Kick), 7:47. Oregon State 7–0. Drive: 8 plays, 69 yards, 3:42.
- OSU – B. J. Baylor 4 Yd Run (Everett Hayes Kick), 1:36. Oregon State 14–0. Drive: 8 plays, 61 yards, 4:13.

Second quarter

- OSU – Deshaun Fenwick 9 Yd Run (Everett Hayes Kick), 11:05. Oregon State 21–0. Drive: 5 plays, 58 yards, 2:37.
- OSU – Teagan Quitoriano 2 Yd pass from Chance Nolan (Everett Hayes Kick), 1:16. Oregon State 28–0. Drive: 9 plays, 67 yards, 4:55.

Third quarter

- OSU – Champ Flemings 30 Yd pass from Chance Nolan (Everett Hayes Kick), 10:51. Oregon State 35–0. Drive: 8 plays, 75 yards, 4:09.
- OSU – B. J. Baylor 2 Yd Run (Everett Hayes Kick), 5:39. Oregon State 42–0. Drive: 8 plays, 63 yards, 3:15.

Fourth quarter

- None

Top passers

- IDA – Mike Beaudry – 6/9, 47 yards
- OSU – Chance Nolan – 14/19, 175 yards, 3 TD

Top rushers

- IDA – C. J. Jordan – 14 rushes, 55 yards
- OSU – B. J. Baylor – 11 rushes, 69 yards, 2 TD

Top receivers

- IDA – Terez Traynor – 5 receptions, 38 yards
- OSU – Luke Musgrave – 3 receptions, 40 yards

=== At USC ===
Oregon State Beavers vs USC Trojans – Game summary

Quarter	1	2	3	4	Total
Beavers	7	14	14	10	45
Trojans	7	10	0	10	27

at Los Angeles Memorial Coliseum • Los Angeles, CA

- Date: September 25, 2021
- Game time: 7:30 p.m. PDT
- Game weather: 63 °F (17 °C); Cloudy
- Game attendance: 51,564
- Referee: Matthew Richards
- TV announcers (FS1): Alex Faust (play by play), Petros Papadakis (analyst)

Game information

First quarter

- OSU – Teagan Quitoriano 27 Yd pass from Chance Nolan (Everett Hayes Kick), 9:58. Oregon State 7–0. Drive: 6 plays, 61 yards, 3:10.
- USC – Gary Bryant Jr. 7 Yd pass from Kedon Slovis (Parker Lewis Kick), 8:14. Tied 7–7. Drive: 5 plays, 75 yards, 1:44.

Second quarter

- USC – Keaontay Ingram 9 Yd Run (Parker Lewis Kick), 13:23. USC 14–7. Drive: 9 plays, 80 yards, 4:35.
- OSU – Tyjon Lindsey 13 Yd pass from Chance Nolan (Everett Hayes Kick), 2:50. Tied 14–14. Drive: 10 plays, 92 yards, 5:20.
- OSU – Tre'Shaun Harrison 36 Yd pass from Chance Nolan (Everett Hayes Kick) 0:44. Oregon State 21–14. Drive: 5 plays, 92 yards, 0:43.
- USC – Parker Lewis 26 Yd Field Goal, 0:00. Oregon State 21–17. Drive: 6 plays, 66 yards, 0:44.

Third quarter

- OSU – Tyjon Lindsey 17 Yd pass from Chance Nolan (Everett Hayes Kick), 12:06. Oregon State 28–17. Drive: 7 plays, 75 yards, 2:54.
- OSU – Jack Colletto 1 Yd Run (Everett Hayes Kick), 6:33. Oregon State 35–17. Drive: 5 plays, 59 yards, 2:42.

Fourth quarter

- OSU – Jack Colletto 1 Yd Run (Everett Hayes Kick), 14:14. Oregon State 42–17. Drive: 8 plays, 64 yards, 4:06.
- USC – Keaontay Ingram 3 Yd Run (Parker Lewis Kick), 10:26. Oregon State 42–24. Drive: 11 plays, 75 yards, 3:48.
- USC – Parker Lewis 46 Yd Field Goal, 6:29. Oregon State 42–27. Drive: 6 plays, 40 yards, 1:59.
- OSU – Everett Hayes 42 Yd Field Goal, 0:58. Oregon State 45–27. Drive: 4 plays, 6 yards, 1:46.

Top passers

- OSU – Chance Nolan – 15/19, 213 yards, 4 TD, 2 INT
- USC – Kedon Slovis – 31/49, 355 yards, 1 TD, 3 INT

Top rushers

- OSU – B. J. Baylor – 23 rushes, 158 yards
- USC – Keaontay Ingram – 14 rushes, 79 yards, 2 TD

Top receivers

- OSU – Tyjon Lindsey – 5 receptions, 102 yards, 2 TD
- USC – Drake London – 10 receptions, 165 yards

=== vs Washington ===
Washington Huskies vs Oregon State Beavers – Game summary

Quarter	1	2	3	4	Total
Huskies	7	3	0	14	24
Beavers	0	14	3	10	27

at Reser Stadium • Corvallis, OR

- Date: October 2, 2021
- Game time: 6:00 p.m. PDT
- Game weather: 70 °F (21 °C) Sunny
- Game attendance: 33,733
- Referee: Mark Duddy
- TV announcers (P12N): Roxy Bernstein (play-by-play), Lincoln Kennedy (analyst)

Game information

First quarter

- WAS – Terrell Bynum 44 Yd pass from Morris the Atrocious (Peyton Henry Kick), 12:02. Washington 7–0. Drive: 6 plays, 75 yards, 2:58.

Second quarter

- OSU – Jack Colletto 3 Yd Run (Everett Hayes Kick), 13:37. Tied 7–7. Drive: 3 plays, 11 yards, 1:18.
- OSU – B. J. Baylor 5 Yd Run (Everett Hayes Kick), 8:25. Oregon State 14–7. Drive: 7 plays, 42 yards, 3:34.
- WAS – Peyton Henry 20 Yd Field Goal, 0:00. Oregon State 14–10. Drive: 12 plays, 68 yards, 3:10.

Third quarter

- OSU – Everett Hayes 29 Yd Field Goal, 5:28. Oregon State 17–10. Drive: 9 plays, 28 yards, 4:53.

Fourth quarter

- WAS – Sean McGrew 39 Yd Run (Peyton Henry Kick), 10:19. Tied 17–17. Drive: 7 plays, 74 yards, 3:52.
- WAS – Sean McGrew 6 Yd Run (Peyton Henry Kick)), 10:02. Washington 24–17. Drive: 1 play, 6 yards, 0:05.
- OSU – B. J. Baylor 27 Yd Run (Everett Hayes Kick), 6:35. Tied 24–24. Drive: 6 plays, 75 yards, 3:27.
- OSU – Everett Hayes 24 Yd Field Goal, 0:00. Oregon State 27–24. Drive: 9 plays, 40 yards, 3:18.

Top passers

- WAS – Dylan Morris – 17/26, 142 yards, TD, INT
- OSU – Chance Nolan – 7/15, 48 yards, INT

Top rushers

- WAS – Sean McGrew – 16 rushes, 104 yards, 2 TD
- OSU – B. J. Baylor – 20 rushes, 111 yards, 2 TD

Top receivers

- WAS – Terrell Bynum – 5 receptions, 61 yards, TD
- OSU – Anthony Gould – 1 reception, 22 yards

=== At Washington State ===
Oregon State Beavers at Washington State Cougars – Game summary

Quarter	1	2	3	4	Total
Beavers	0	10	7	7	24
Cougars	0	3	14	14	31

at Martin Stadium • Pullman, WA

- Date: October 9, 2021
- Game time: 1:00 p.m. PDT
- Game weather: 58 °F (14 °C)
- Game attendance: 24,157
- Referee: Mike McCabe
- TV announcers (P12N): Ted Robinson (play-by-play), Yogi Roth (analyst)

Game information

First quarter
Second quarter
Third quarter
Fourth quarter

Top passers

- OSU – Chance Nolan – 11/25, 158 yards, 2 INT
- WSU – Jayden de Laura – 7/15, 48 yards, INT

Top rushers

- OSU – B. J. Baylor – 18 rushes, 145 yards
- WSU – Deon McIntosh – 13 rushes, 65 yards

Top receivers

- OSU – Champ Flemings – 2 receptions, 38 yards
- WSU – Travell Harris – 8 reception, 147 yards

=== vs Utah ===
Utah Utes vs Oregon State Beavers – Game summary

Quarter	1	2	3	4	Total
Utes	14	10	7	3	34
Beavers	7	7	21	7	42

at Reser Stadium • Corvallis, OR

- Date: October 23, 2021
- Game time: 4:30 p.m. PST
- Game weather: 55 °F (13 °C); Sunny; Wind: 8 MPH
- Game attendance: 30,203
- Referee: Michael Mothershed
- TV announcers (P12N): Ted Robinson (play-by-play), Yogi Roth (analyst)

Game information

First quarter
Second quarter
Third quarter
Fourth quarter

Top passers

- UTA – Cameron Rising – 22/36, 267 yards, 2 TD
- OSU – Chance Nolan – 14/19, 208 yards, 2 TD

Top rushers

- UTA – Tavion Thomas – 21 rushes, 74 yards, 2 TD
- OSU – B. J. Baylor – 19 rushes, 152 yards, 1 TD

Top receivers

- UTA – Devaughn Vele – 3 receptions, 69 yards
- OSU – Trevon Bradford – 6 receptions, 74 yards, TD

=== At California ===
Oregon State Beavers vs California Golden Bears – Game summary

Quarter	1	2	3	4	Total
Beavers	0	10	7	8	25
Golden Bears	10	7	14	8	39

at California Memorial Stadium • Berkeley, CA

- Date: October 30, 2021
- Game time: 4:00 p.m. PDT
- Game weather: 61 °F (16 °C); Cloudy; Wind: SW 12 mph
- Game attendance: 38,572
- Referee: Chris Coyle
- TV announcers (P12N): Ted Robinson (play-by-play), Yogi Roth (analyst)

Game information

First quarter
Second quarter
Third quarter
Fourth quarter

Top passers

- OSU – Chance Nolan – 15/26, 243 yards, 2 TD, 2 INT
- CAL – Chase Garbers – 17/26, 262 yards, 3 TD

Top rushers

- OSU – Deshaun Fenwick – 10 rushes, 48 yards, 1 TD
- CAL – Damien Moore – 11 rushes, 111 yards, 1 TD

Top receivers

- OSU – Trevon Bradford – 6 receptions, 124 yards, 2 TD
- CAL – Trevon Clark – 5 reception, 90 yards, 1 TD

=== At Colorado ===
Oregon State Beavers vs Colorado Buffaloes – Game summary

Quarter	1	2	3	4	OT	2OT	Total
Beavers	0	10	7	10	7	0	34
Buffaloes	10	3	7	7	7	3	37

at Folsom Field • Boulder, CO

- Date: November 6, 2021
- Game time: 4:00 p.m. PDT
- Game attendance: -
- Referee: Matthew Richards
- TV announcers (P12N): Ted Robinson, Yogi Roth

Game information

First quarter
Second quarter
Third quarter
Fourth quarter

Top passers

- OSU – Chance Nolan – 20/38, 255 yards, 1 TD, 1 INT
- COL – Brendon Lewis – 15/24, 170 yards, 3 TD

Top rushers

- OSU – B. J. Baylor – 22 rushes, 98 yards, 1 TD
- COL – Jarek Broussard – 24 rushes, 151 yards

Top receivers

- OSU – Trey Lowe – 5 receptions, 52 yards
- COL – Daniel Arias – 2 reception, 52 yards, 1 TD

=== vs Stanford ===
Stanford Cardinal vs Oregon State Beavers – Game summary

Quarter	1	2	3	4	Total
Cardinal	0	0	7	7	14
Beavers	7	7	14	7	35

at Reser Stadium • Corvallis, OR

- Date: November 13, 2021
- Game time: 2:40 p.m.
- Game weather: 59 °F (15 °C) Sunny, Wind: 5 mph SE
- Game attendance: 35,129
- Referee: Mike McCabe
- TV announcers (P12N): JB Long, Max Browne

Game information

First quarter
Second quarter
Third quarter
Fourth quarter

Top passers

- STA – Ari Patu – 7/14, 51 yards, 1 TD, 1 INT
- OSU – Chance Nolan – 19/25, 257 yards, 2 TD

Top rushers

- STA – Isaiah Sanders – 9 rushes, 37 yards
- OSU – B. J. Baylor – 23 rushes, 80 yards, 1 TD

Top receivers

- STA – Michael Wilson – 5 receptions, 50 yards
- OSU – Trevon Bradford – 3 receptions, 80 yards, 1 TD

=== vs Arizona State ===
Arizona State Sun Devils vs Oregon State Beavers – Game summary

Quarter	1	2	3	4	Total
Sun Devils	0	0	3	7	10
Beavers	3	14	0	7	24

at Reser Stadium • Corvallis, OR

- Date: November 20, 2021
- Game time: 7:35 p.m.
- Game weather: 42 °F (6 °C); Sunny;
- Game attendance: 29,579
- Referee: Michael Mothershed
- TV announcers (ESPN): Dave Flemming, Rod Gilmore , Stormy Buonantony

Game information

First quarter
Second quarter
Third quarter
Fourth quarter

Top passers

- ASU – Jayden Daniels – 16/27, 166 yards, 1 INT
- OSU – Chance Nolan – 12/18, 90 yards, 1 TD

Top rushers

- ASU – Jayden Daniels – 10 rushes, 16 yards
- OSU – B. J. Baylor – 20 rushes, 150 yards

Top receivers

- ASU – Rachaad White – 6 receptions, 86 yards
- OSU – Trevon Bradford – 3 receptions, 26 yards

=== At No. 11 Oregon ===
Oregon State Beavers vs Oregon Ducks – Game summary

Quarter	1	2	3	4	Total
Beavers	3	0	6	20	29
No. 11 Ducks	14	10	0	14	38

at Autzen Stadium • Eugene, OR

- Date: November 27, 2021
- Game time: 12:35 p.m.
- Game weather: 56 °F (13 °C); Cloudy;
- Game attendance: 56,408
- Referee: Chris Coyle
- TV announcers (ESPN): Dave Pasch, Dusty Dvoracek, Tom Luginbill

Game information

First quarter
Second quarter
Third quarter
Fourth quarter

Top passers

- OSU – Chance Nolan – 25/39, 308 yards, 2 TD, 1 INT
- ORE – Anthony Brown – 23/28, 275 yards, 2 TD

Top rushers

- OSU – B. J. Baylor – 13 rushes, 59 yards, 1 TD
- ORE – Travis Dye – 20 rushes, 99 yards, 2 TD

Top receivers

- OSU – Luke Musgrave – 7 receptions, 85 yards, 1 TD
- ORE – Devon Williams – 6 receptions, 110 yards, 1 TD

=== vs Utah State (2021 LA Bowl) ===
Utah State Aggies vs Oregon State Beavers – Game summary

Quarter	1	2	3	4	Total
Aggies	0	14	10	0	24
Beavers	7	3	0	3	13

at SoFi Stadium • Inglewood, California

- Date: December 18, 2021
- Game time: 4:30 p.m. PST
- Game weather: 62 °F (17 °C) Sunny
- Game attendance: 29,896
- Referee: Jeff Servinski
- TV announcers (ABC): Joe Tessitore (play-by-play), Greg McElroy (analyst), and Laura Rutledge (sideline)
- Box score

Game information

First quarter

- OSU – Jesiah Irish 20-yard run (Everett Hayes kick), 14:02. Oregon State 7–0. Drive: 3 plays, 71 yards, 0:52.

Second quarter

- USU – Deven Thompkins 62-yard pass from Cooper Legas (Connor Coles kick), 14:42. Tie 7–7. Drive: 1 play, 62 yards, 0:09.
- OSU – Everett Hayes 37-yard field goal, 8:40. Oregon State 10–7. Drive: 13 plays, 66 yards, 5:56.
- USU – Calvin Tyler Jr. 15-yard run (Connor Coles kick), 4:24. Utah State 14–10. Drive: 11 plays, 85 yards, 4:16.

Third quarter

- USU – Connor Coles 25-yard field goal, 10:05. Utah State 17–10. Drive: 13 plays, 64 yards, 4:55.
- USU – Brandon Bowling 5-yard pass from Cooper Legas (Connor Coles kick), 3:49. Utah State 24–10. Drive: 9 plays, 74 yards, 3:06.

Fourth quarter

- OSU – Everett Hayes 34-yard field goal, 13:35. Utah State 24–13. Drive: 12 plays, 59 yards, 5:14.

Top passers

- USU – Cooper Legas – 11/20, 171 yards, 2 TD, 1 INT
- OSU – Chance Nolan – 21/30, 263 yards, 1 INT

Top rushers

- USU – Calvin Tyler Jr. – 26 rushes, 120 yards, 1 TD
- OSU – B. J. Baylor – 18 rushes, 78 yards

Top receivers

- USU – Deven Thompkins – 6 receptions, 115 yards, 1 TD
- OSU – Tre'Shaun Harrison – 4 receptions, 55 yards
