= 2021 Stanford Cardinal football team =

American college football season

2021 Stanford Cardinal football
- Conference: Pac-12 Conference
- North Division
- Record: 3–9 (2–7 Pac-12)
- Head coach: David Shaw (11th season)
- Offensive coordinator: Tavita Pritchard (4th season)
- Offensive scheme: Multiple
- Defensive coordinator: Lance Anderson (8th season)
- Base defense: 3–4
- Home stadium: Stanford Stadium

Uniform
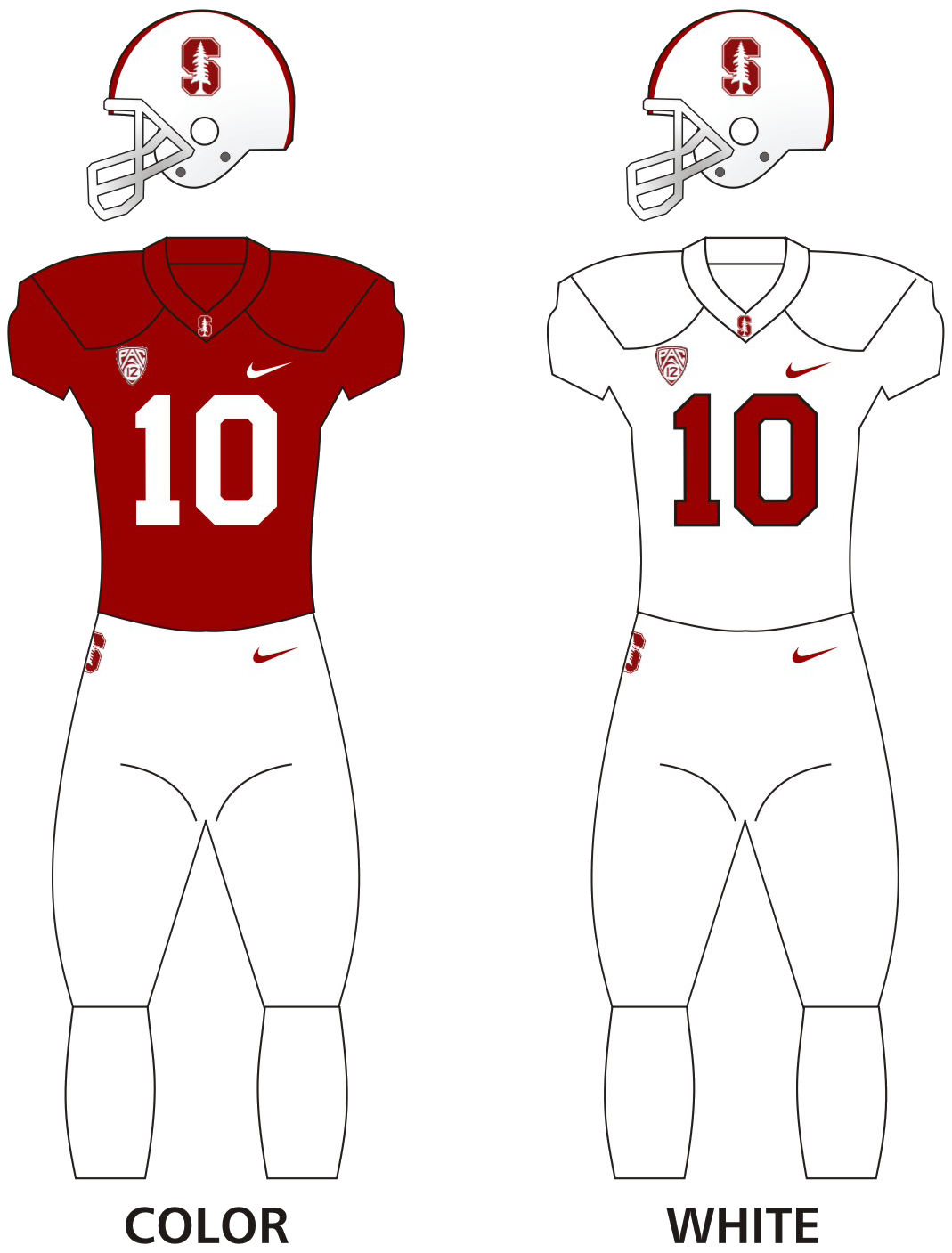

2021 Pac-12 Conference football standings
	Conf.			Overall
Team	W		L	W		L
North Division
No. 22 Oregon xy	7	–	2	10	–	4
Washington State	6	–	3	7	–	6
Oregon State	5	–	4	7	–	6
California	4	–	5	5	–	7
Washington	3	–	6	4	–	8
Stanford	2	–	7	3	–	9
South Division
No. 12 Utah xy$	8	–	1	10	–	4
UCLA	6	–	3	8	–	4
Arizona State†	0	–	3	0	–	5
USC	3	–	6	4	–	8
Colorado	3	–	6	4	–	8
Arizona	1	–	8	1	–	11
Championship: Utah 38, Oregon 10
$ – Conference champion; x – Division champion/co-champions; y – Championship game participant; Rankings from AP Poll

The 2021 Stanford Cardinal football team represented Stanford University in the 2021 NCAA Division I FBS football season. The Cardinal were led by eleventh-year head coach David Shaw. They played their home games at Stanford Stadium as members of the North Division of the Pac-12 Conference. They finished the season 3–9, 2–7 in Pac-12 play, to finish last place in the North Division. This was Shaw's worst season ever and Stanford's worst record since the team went 1–11 in the 2006 season.

== Schedule ==
Date	Time	Opponent	Site	TV	Result	Attendance
September 4	9:00 a.m.	vs. Kansas State*	AT&T Stadium; Arlington, TX (Allstate Kickoff Classic)	FS1	L 7–24	28,668
September 11	7:30 p.m.	at No. 14 USC	Los Angeles Memorial Coliseum; Los Angeles, CA (rivalry)	FOX	W 42–28	56,945
September 18	5:00 p.m.	at Vanderbilt*	Vanderbilt Stadium; Nashville, TN	ESPNU	W 41–23	21,124
September 25	3:00 p.m.	No. 24 UCLA	Stanford Stadium; Stanford, CA (rivalry)	P12N	L 24–35	47,236
October 2	12:30 p.m.	No. 3 Oregon	Stanford Stadium; Stanford, CA (rivalry)	ABC	W 31–24 ^{OT}	31,610
October 8	7:30 p.m.	at No. 22 Arizona State	Sun Devil Stadium; Tempe, AZ	ESPN	L 10–28	46,192
October 16	4:30 p.m.	at Washington State	Martin Stadium; Pullman, WA	ESPNU	L 31–34	26,171
October 30	7:30 p.m.	Washington	Stanford Stadium; Stanford, CA	FS1	L 13–20	28,014
November 5	7:30 p.m.	Utah	Stanford Stadium; Stanford, CA	FS1	L 7–52	26,410
November 13	2:30 p.m.	at Oregon State	Reser Stadium; Corvallis, OR	P12N	L 14–35	35,129
November 20	4:00 p.m.	California	Stanford Stadium; Stanford, CA (Big Game)	P12N	L 11–41	49,265
November 27	5:00 p.m.	No. 6 Notre Dame*	Stanford Stadium; Stanford, CA (rivalry)	FOX	L 14–45	31,571
*Non-conference game; Rankings from AP Poll and CFP Rankings after November 2 released prior to game; All times are in Pacific time

== Personnel ==
=== Roster ===
2021 Stanford Cardinal football team roster
Players
Coaches
Offense

Pos.	#	Name	Class
QB	0	Isaiah Sanders	GS
RB	2	Casey Filkins	So
WR	3	Marcus Graham	Jr
WR	4	Michael Wilson	Sr
WR	5	John Humphreys	So
WR	6	Elijah Higgins	Jr
RB	8	Nathaniel Peat	Jr
WR	9	Colby Bowman	Jr
QB	10	Jack West	Sr
QB	11	Ari Patu	Fr
QB	17	Dylan Plautz	Sr
QB	18	Tanner McKee	So
WR	19	Silas Starr	So
RB	20	Austin Jones	Jr
RB	22	E. J. Smith	So
FB	24	Jay Symonds	Sr
WR	25	Bryce Farrell	So
WR	26	Brendon Barrow	Fr
QB	27	Beau Nelson	So
RB	28	Dorian Maddox	GS
RB	29	Caleb Robinson	So
FB	34	Houston Heimuli	Sr
FB	48	Coco Lukrich	Fr
C	55	Drake Metcalf	So
G	57	Levi Rogers	So
C	60	Drake Nugent	Jr
G	63	Barrett Miller	Jr
G	66	Branson Bragg	Jr
G/T	68	Max Kalny	So
G/T	70	Jason Amler	Fr
OT	71	Connor McLaughlin	So
G/T	72	Austin Uke	Fr
G	73	Jake Hornibrook	Jr
OT	74	James Pogorelc	So
OT	75	Walter Rouse	Jr
G/T	76	Jack Leyrer	Fr
G	77	Logan Berzins	So
OT	78	Myles Hinton	So
G/C	79	Will Gibson	Fr
WR	80	David Kasemervisz	Fr
WR	81	Brycen Tremayne	Sr
WR	82	Jayson Raines	Fr
WR	83	Danny McFadden	Fr
TE	84	Benjamin Yurosek	So
FB	85	Shield Taylor	Fr
TE	87	Bradley Archer	Jr
TE/DE	88	Tucker Fisk	Sr
TE	89	Lukas Ungar	So

Defense

Pos.	#	Name	Class
OLB	0	Aeneas DiCosmo	Jr
S	2	Jonathan McGill	Jr
ILB	3	Levani Damuni	Jr
DE	4	Thomas Booker	Sr
CB/S	5	Donjae Logan	Sr
OLB	6	Andres Fox	Sr
ILB	8	Tristan Sinclair	Jr
S	9	Noah Williams	GS
OLB	10	Jordan Fox	GS
OLB	11	Thunder Keck	Sr
CB	13	Ethan Bonner	Sr
ILB	14	Jacob Magnum-Farrar	Sr
OLB	15	Stephen Herron	Jr
CB	17	Kyu Blu Kelly	Jr
CB	18	Jimmy Wyrick	Fr
S	19	Caleb Ellis	Fr
CB	20	Jaden Slocum	Fr
S	21	Kendall Williamson	Sr
ILB	22	Jason Kaul	Jr
DE	23	Ryan Johnson	Sr
CB	24	Nicolas Toomer	Jr
CB	25	Brandon Jones	So
ILB	26	William Stockwell	Fr
S	27	Omari Porter	So
CB	28	Salim Turner-Muhammad	Jr
ILB	29	Spencer Jorgensen	Jr
ILB	30	Ese Dubre	Fr
CB	31	Zahran Manley	Jr
S	32	Mitch Leigber	Fr
S	33	Alaka'i Gilman	So
CB	34	Evan Jackson	Fr
DT	40	Tobin Phillips	So
ILB	44	Caleb Kelly	Sr
ILB	45	Ricky Miezan	Sr
OLB	47	Tangaloa Kaufusi	Sr
DT	50	Dalyn Wade-Perry	GS
OLB	52	Duke Reeder	Fr
OLB	54	Kiersten Lee	So
DE	55	Matthew Merritt	So
ILB	56	Jake Lynch	Sr
OLB	58	Wilfredo Aybar	Fr
OLB	90	Gabe Reid	GS
OLB	92	Lance Keneley	So
DE	93	Trey LaBounty	So
DE	94	Anthony Franklin	Fr
DE	95	Aristotle Taylor	Fr
DE	96	Jacob Katona	Fr
DE	97	Aaron Armitage	Fr
DE	98	Zach Buckey	Fr
DT	99	Zephron Lester	So

Special teams

Pos.	#	Name	Class
P	15	Connor Weselman	Fr
P	23	Ryan Sanborn	Jr
K/P	39	Alexander Thorpe	Jr
K	41	Diego Preciado	Jr
LS	42	Bailey Parsons	So
K	43	Joshua Karty	So
LS	49	Kyle Petrucci	Sr

Head coach

- David Shaw

Coordinators/assistant coaches

- Lance Anderson – Defensive coordinator
- Tavita Pritchard – Offensive coordinator / quarterbacks
- Pete Alamar – Special teams coordinator
- Duane Akina – Defensive backs
- Ron Gould – Running backs
- Terry Heffernan – Offensive line
- Bobby Kennedy – Wide receivers
- Diron Reynolds – Defensive line
- Eric Sanders – Inside linebackers
- Morgan Turner – Tight ends
- Tsuyoshi Kawata – Offensive quality control analyst
- Greg Mangan – Offensive quality control analyst
- Steve Donatell – Defensive quality control analyst
- Patrick Moynahan – Defensive quality control analyst
- Matt Moran – Special teams assistant
- Thomas Merkle – Offensive graduate assistant
- John Sikora – Offensive graduate assistant
- Admir Fehric – Defensive graduate assistant
- Jonathan McDonald – Defensive graduate assistant

Legend

- (C) Team captain
- (S) Suspended
- (I) Ineligible
- Injured
- Redshirt

Roster
Last update: October 1, 2021

=== Depth chart ===
†	As of October 1, 2021

Defense

FS
⋅
⋅
⋅

WLB	ILB	ILB	SLB
⋅	⋅	⋅	⋅
⋅	⋅	⋅	⋅
⋅	⋅	⋅	⋅

SS
⋅
⋅
⋅

CB
⋅
⋅
⋅

DE	NT	DE
⋅	⋅	⋅
⋅	⋅	⋅
⋅	⋅	⋅

CB
⋅
⋅
⋅

Offense

WR
⋅
⋅
⋅

LT	LG	C	RG	RT
⋅	⋅	⋅	⋅	⋅
⋅	⋅	⋅	⋅	⋅
⋅	⋅	⋅	⋅	⋅

TE
⋅
⋅
⋅

WR
⋅
⋅
⋅

QB
⋅
⋅
⋅

RB
⋅
⋅
⋅

FB
⋅
⋅
⋅

Special teams

== Game summaries ==
=== Vs. Kansas State ===
Kansas State Wildcats vs. Stanford Cardinal (Allstate Kickoff Classic) – Game summary

Quarter	1	2	3	4	Total
Wildcats	7	7	0	10	24
Cardinal	0	0	0	7	7

at AT&T Stadium • Arlington, TX

- Date: September 4, 2021
- Game time: 9:00 a.m. PDT
- Game weather: Indoors
- Game attendance: 28,668
- Referee: Chris Coyte
- TV announcers (FS1): Aaron Goldsmith (play–by–play) and Mark Helfrich (analyst)

Game information

First quarter

- KSU – Skylar Thompson 6-yard run (Taiten Winkel kick), 3:06. Kansas State 7–0. Drive: 2 plays, 62 yards, 0:56.

Second quarter

- KSU – Deuce Vaughn 59-yard run (Taiten Winkel kick), 6:17. Kansas State 14–0. Drive: 3 plays, 71 yards, 1:39.

Third quarter

- No scoring plays.

Fourth quarter

- KSU – Taiten Winkel 40-yard field goal, 10:08. Kansas State 17–0. Drive: 9 plays, 44 yards, 4:43.
- KSU – Skylar Thompson 13-yard run (Taiten Winkel kick), 7:10. Kansas State 24–0. Drive: 2 plays, 20 yards, 0:46.
- STAN – Brycen Tremayne 14-yard pass from Tanner McKee (Joshua Karty kick), 3:16. Kansas State 24–7. Drive: 10 plays, 75 yards, 3:54.

Top passers

- STAN – Tanner McKee – 15/18, 118 yards, TD
- KSU – Skylar Thompson – 9/14, 144 yards, int

Top rushers

- STAN – Austin Jones – 9 rushes, 25 yards
- KSU – Deuce Vaughn – 13 rushes, 124 yards, TD

Top receivers

- STAN – Brycen Tremayne – 5 receptions, 62 yards, TD
- KSU – Phillip Brooks – 3 receptions, 81 yards

Kansas State began with a 14-point lead at halftime with performances by quarterback Skylar Thompson and running back Deuce Vaughn. The Wildcats managed to score 24 points before allowing Stanford to put points on the board with just 3:16 left in the game. Stanford head coach David Shaw stated: "This game was not indicative of how hard we've played, how hard we've practiced and how well we practiced. Disappointing to me that we didn't go out there and execute better." Shaw is in his 11th season as Stanford's coach. Stanford started senior Jack West at quarterback and rotated him with sophomore Tanner McKee throughout the game.

The Wichita Eagle reported that the stadium was mostly filled with Kansas State fans and that Kansas State significantly out-performed Stanford. Specifically, the paper published that "the Kansas State football team opened its season with a statement victory on Saturday at AT&T Stadium."

=== At No. 14 USC ===
Stanford Cardinal at No. 14 USC Trojans – Game summary

Quarter	1	2	3	4	Total
Cardinal	7	14	14	7	42
No. 14 Trojans	0	10	3	15	28

at Los Angeles Memorial Coliseum • Los Angeles, CA

- Date: September 11, 2021
- Game time: 7:30 p.m. PDT
- Game weather: Sunny, 73 °F (23 °C)
- Game attendance: 56,945
- Referee: Michael Mothershed
- TV announcers (Fox): Tim Brando (play–by–play) and Spencer Tillman (analyst)
- Reference

Game information

First quarter

- STAN – Nathaniel Peat 87-yard run (Joshua Karty kick), 9:04. Stanford 7–0. Drive: 1 play, 87 yards, 0:12.

Second quarter

- USC – Keaontay Ingram 2-yard run (Alex Stadthaus kick), 13:28. Tied 7–7. Drive: 15 plays, 95 yards, 5:26.
- STAN – Elijah Higgins 3-yard pass from Tanner McKee (Joshua Karty kick), 8:34. Stanford 14–7. Drive: 9 plays, 73 yards, 4:54.
- USC – Alex Stadthaus 24-yard field goal, 1:56. Stanford 14–10. Drive: 15 plays, 68 yards, 6:38.
- STAN – Brycen Tremayne 6-yard pass from Tanner McKee (Joshua Karty kick), 0:09. Stanford 21–10. Drive: 4 plays, 66 yards, 1:47.

Third quarter

- USC – Alex Stadthaus 33-yard field goal, 9:14. Stanford 21–13. Drive: 12 plays, 59 yards, 5:46.
- STAN – Kyu Blu Kelly 31-yard interception return (Joshua Karty kick), 5:02. Stanford 28–13. Drive: 3 plays, 5 yards, 1:21.
- STAN – Tanner McKee 1-yard run (Joshua Karty kick), 0:25. Stanford 35–13. Drive: 5 plays, 55 yards, 2:15.

Fourth quarter

- STAN – Isaiah Sanders 2-yard run (Joshua Karty kick), 9:16. Stanford 42–13. Drive: 10 plays, 67 yards, 5:44.
- USC – Drake London 11-yard pass from Kedon Slovis (Alex Stadthaus kick), 5:54. Stanford 42–20. Drive: 9 plays, 74 yards, 3:22.
- USC – Darwin Barlow 4-yard run (Kedon Slovis–Gary Bryant Jr. pass), 0:46. Stanford 42–28. Drive: 10 plays, 69 yards, 2:39.

Top passers

- STAN – Tanner McKee – 16/23, 234 yards, 2 TD
- USC – Kedon Slovis – 27/42, 223 yards, TD, int

Top rushers

- STAN – Nathaniel Peat – 6 rushes, 115 yards, TD
- USC – Vavae Malepeai – 15 rushes, 94 yards

Top receivers

- STAN – Elijah Higgins – 5 receptions, 67 yards, TD
- USC – Drake London – 4 receptions, 68 yards, TD

In Tanner McKee's first start as Stanford quarterback, the Cardinal pulled off a surprising rout of USC in the Coliseum, leading by as many as 29 points in the 4th quarter. Following the game, USC head coach Clay Helton was fired and replaced by Donte Williams as interim head coach.

=== At Vanderbilt ===
Stanford Cardinal at Vanderbilt Commodores – Game summary

Quarter	1	2	3	4	Total
Cardinal	14	13	7	7	41
Commodores	7	7	3	6	23

at Vanderbilt Stadium • Nashville, TN

- Date: September 18, 2021
- Game time: 5:00 p.m. PDT
- Game weather: Cloudy,
- Game attendance: 21,124
- Referee: Steve Marlowe
- TV announcers (ESPNU): Clay Matvick (play–by–play), Rocky Boiman (analyst) and Tiffany Blackmon (sideline)
- Reference

Game information

First quarter

- STAN – Tanner McKee 7-yard run (Joshua Karty kick), 12:37. Stanford 7–0. Drive: 4 plays, 75 yards, 2:23.
- VAN – Re'Mahn Davis 1-yard run (Joseph Bulovas kick), 7:35. Tied 7–7. Drive: 14 plays, 75 yards, 5:02.
- STAN – Nathaniel Peat 21-yard run (Joshua Karty kick), 2:52. Stanford 14–7. Drive: 9 plays, 68 yards, 4:36.

Second quarter

- VAN – Devin Boddie Jr. 3-yard pass from Ken Seals (Joseph Bulovas kick), 4:19. Tied 14–14. Drive: 14 plays, 98 yards, 7:16.
- STAN – Joshua Karty 46-yard field goal, 1:53. Stanford 17–14. Drive: 5 plays, 26 yards, 2:17.
- STAN – Brycen Tremayne 5-yard pass from Tanner McKee (Joshua Karty kick), 0:40. Stanford 24–14. Drive: 2 plays, 31 yards, 0:42.
- STAN – Joshua Karty 35-yard field goal, 0:00. Stanford 27–14. Drive: 1 play, 0 yards, 0:00.

Third quarter

- STAN – Jay Symonds 5-yard pass from Tanner McKee (Joshua Karty kick), 11:18. Stanford 34–14. Drive: 4 plays, 55 yards, 1:31.
- VAN – Joseph Bulovas 34-yard field goal, 8:26. Stanford 34–17. Drive: 9 plays, 59 yards, 2:52.

Fourth quarter

- STAN – E. J. Smith 1-yard run (Joshua Karty kick), 1:44. Stanford 41–17. Drive: 8 plays, 86 yards, 5:08.
- VAN – Cam Johnson 26-yard pass from Mike Wright, 0:00. Stanford 41–23. Drive: 8 plays, 75 yards, 1:44.

Top passers

- STAN – Tanner McKee – 19/29, 218 yards, 2 TD
- VAN – Ken Seals – 16/37, 120 yards, TD, int

Top rushers

- STAN – Austin Jones – 7 rushes, 80 yards
- VAN – Rocko Griffin – 19 rushes, 107 yards

Top receivers

- STAN – Brycen Tremayne – 5 receptions, 54 yards, TD
- VAN – Chris Pierce Jr. – 6 receptions, 52 yards

=== No. 24 UCLA ===
No. 24 UCLA Bruins vs. Stanford Cardinal – Game summary

Quarter	1	2	3	4	Total
No. 24 Bruins	14	7	0	14	35
Cardinal	0	7	7	10	24

at Stanford Stadium • Stanford, CA

- Date: September 25, 2021
- Game time: 3:00 p.m. PDT
- Game weather: 73 °F (23 °C) Sunny
- Game attendance: 47,236
- Referee: Mark Duddy
- TV announcers (P12N): Ted Robinson (play–by–play) and Yogi Roth (analyst)
- Reference

Game information

First quarter

- UCLA – Dorian Thompson-Robinson 1-yard run (Nicholas Barr-Mira kick), 12:12. UCLA 7–0. Drive: 4 plays, 13 yards, 2:16.
- UCLA – Zach Charbonnet 5-yard run (Nicholas Barr-Mira kick), 0:15. UCLA 14–0. Drive: 17 plays, 88 yards, 8:00.

Second quarter

- STAN – Brycen Tremayne 19-yard pass from Tanner McKee (Joshua Karty kick), 4:31. UCLA 14–7. Drive: 7 plays, 70 yards, 4:05.
- UCLA – Dorian Thompson-Robinson 2-yard run (Nicholas Barr-Mira kick), 0:23. UCLA 21–7. Drive: 7 plays, 55 yards, 1:17.

Third quarter

- STAN – Elijah Higgins 56-yard pass from Tanner McKee (Joshua Karty kick), 5:30. UCLA 21–14. Drive: 1 play, 56 yards, 0:10.

Fourth quarter

- STAN – Bryce Farrell 52-yard pass from Tanner McKee (Joshua Karty kick), 13:06. Tied 21–21. Drive: 5 plays, 80 yards, 2:16.
- UCLA – Kyle Philips 75-yard pass from Dorian Thompson-Robinson (Nicholas Barr-Mira kick), 12:56. UCLA 28–21. Drive: 1 play, 75 yards, 0:10.
- STAN – Joshua Karty 45-yard field goal, 9:10. UCLA 28–24. Drive: 7 plays, 45 yards, 3:06.
- UCLA – Kyle Philips 5-yard pass from Dorian Thompson-Robinson (Nicholas Barr-Mira kick), 2:30. UCLA 35–24. Drive: 13 plays, 75 yards, 6:40.

Top passers

- UCLA – Dorian Thompson-Robinson – 18/29, 251 yards, 2 TD
- STAN – Tanner McKee – 19/32, 293 yards, 3 TD

Top rushers

- UCLA – Zach Charbonnet – 23 rushes, 118 yards, TD
- STAN – Tanner McKee – 8 rushes, 42 yards

Top receivers

- UCLA – Kyle Philips – 5 receptions, 120 yards, 2 TD
- STAN – Elijah Higgins – 5 receptions, 103 yards, TD

=== No. 3 Oregon ===
No. 3 Oregon Ducks vs. Stanford Cardinal – Game summary

Quarter	1	2	3	4	OT	Total
No. 3 Ducks	0	7	10	7	0	24
Cardinal	10	7	0	7	7	31

at Stanford Stadium • Stanford, CA

- Date: October 2, 2021
- Game time: 12:30 p.m. PDT
- Game weather: 80 °F (27 °C) Sunny
- Game attendance: 31,610
- Referee: Matthew Richards
- TV announcers (ABC): Dave Flemming (play-by-play), Rod Gilmore (analyst), Stormy Buonantony (sideline)
- Reference

Game information

First quarter

- STAN – Joshua Karty 25-yard field goal, 10:30. Stanford 3–0. Drive: 11 plays, 50 yards, 4:30.
- STAN – Brycen Tremayne 18-yard pass from Tanner McKee (Joshua Karty kick), 6:25. Stanford 10–0. Drive: 2 plays, 43 yards, 0:40.

Second quarter

- ORE – Anthony Brown 3-yard run (Camden Lewis kick), 14:34. Stanford 10–7. Drive: 8 plays, 55 yards, 2:31.
- STAN – Isaiah Sanders 2-yard run (Joshua Karty kick), 8:02. Stanford 17–7. Drive: 12 plays, 75 yards, 6:32.

Third quarter

- ORE – C. J. Verdell 1-yard run (Camden Lewis kick), 8:32. Stanford 17–14. Drive: 8 plays, 48 yards, 3:48.
- ORE – Camden Lewis 22-yard field goal, 0:53. Tied 17–17. Drive: 12 plays, 34 yards, 6:16.

Fourth quarter

- ORE – Anthony Brown 5-yard run (Camden Lewis kick), 9:32. Oregon 24–17. Drive: 5 plays, 80 yards, 2:11.
- STAN – Elijah Higgins 2-yard pass from Tanner McKee (Joshua Karty kick), 0:00. Tied 24–24. Drive: 11 plays, 86 yards, 0:00.

First Overtime

- STAN – John Humphreys 14-yard pass from Tanner McKee (Joshua Karty kick). Stanford 31–24. Drive: 6 plays, 25 yards.

Top passers

- ORE – Anthony Brown – 14/26, 186 yards, int
- STAN – Tanner McKee – 20/36, 230 yards, 3 TD

Top rushers

- ORE – Travis Dye – 19 rushes, 96 yards
- STAN – Nathaniel Peat – 15 rushes, 78 yards

Top receivers

- ORE – Mycah Pittman – 1 reception, 66 yards
- STAN – Elijah Higgins – 6 receptions, 62 yards, TD

=== At No. 22 Arizona State ===
Stanford Cardinal at No. 22 Arizona State Sun Devils – Game summary

Quarter	1	2	3	4	Total
Cardinal	7	0	3	0	10
No. 22 Sun Devils	14	7	7	0	28

at Sun Devil Stadium • Tempe, AZ

- Date: October 8, 2021
- Game time: 7:30 p.m. PST
- Game weather: 86 °F (30 °C), Cloudy, Wind: W 20mph
- Game attendance: 46,192
- Referee: Steven Strimling
- TV announcers (ESPN): Jason Benetti (play-by-play), Andre Ware (analyst) and Paul Carcaterra (sideline)
- Reference

Game information

First quarter

- ASU – Jayden Daniels 51-yard run (Cristian Zendejas kick), 7:12. Arizona State 7–0. Drive: 9 plays, 87 yards, 4:20.
- STAN – Elijah Higgins 6-yard pass from Tanner McKee (Emmet Kenney kick), 4:09. Tied 7–7. Drive: 7 plays, 75 yards, 3:03.
- ASU – Rachaad White 5-yard run (Cristian Zendejas kick), 1:05. Arizona State 14–7. Drive: 7 plays, 75 yards, 3:04.

Second quarter

- ASU – Elijhah Badger 22-yard run (Cristian Zendejas kick), 10:24. Arizona State 21–7. Drive: 6 plays, 80 yards, 2:14.

Third quarter

- STAN – Ryan Sanborn 32-yard field goal, 7:32. Arizona State 21–10. Drive: 9 plays, 46 yards, 4:26.
- ASU – DeAndre Pierce 27-yard interception return (Cristian Zendejas kick), 2:38. Arizona State 28–10. Drive: 3 plays, 8 yards, 1:18.

Fourth quarter

- No scoring plays.

Top passers

- STAN – Tanner McKee – 27/45, 356 yards, TD, 3 int
- ASU – Jayden Daniels – 14/23, 175 yards

Top rushers

- STAN – Nathaniel Peat – 7 rushes, 32 yards
- ASU – Rachaad White – 13 rushes, 96 yards, TD

Top receivers

- STAN – Benjamin Yurosek – 6 receptions, 118 yards
- ASU – Curtis Hodges – 4 receptions, 76 yards

=== At Washington State ===
Stanford Cardinal at Washington State Cougars – Game summary

Quarter	1	2	3	4	Total
Cardinal	13	3	0	15	31
Cougars	0	20	7	7	34

at Martin Stadium • Pullman, WA

- Date: October 16, 2021
- Game time: 4:30 p.m. PDT
- Game weather: Sunny, 68 °F (20 °C)
- Game attendance: 26,171
- Referee: Micheal Mothershed
- TV announcers (ESPNU): Kevin Brown, Hutson Mason
- Reference

Game information

First quarter

- STAN – Benjamin Yurosek 45-yard pass from Tanner McKee (Joshua Karty kick), 11:10. Stanford 7–0. Drive: 7 plays, 75 yards, 3:50.
- STAN – Joshua Karty 51-yard field goal, 4:45. Stanford 10–0. Drive: 5 plays, 15 yards, 1:10.
- STAN – Joshua Karty 32-yard field goal, 0:13. Stanford 13–0. Drive: 8 plays, 33 yards, 3:36.

Second quarter

- WSU – Travell Harris 32-yard pass from Jayden de Laura (Dean Janikowski kick), 13:24. Stanford 13–7. Drive: 3 plays, 70 yards, 1:49.
- WSU – Calvin Jackson Jr. 31-yard pass from Jayden de Laura (kick blocked), 9:21. Tied 13–13. Drive: 6 plays, 70 yards, 2:58.
- WSU – De'Zhaun Stribling 10-yard pass from Jayden de Laura (Dean Janikowski kick), 3:07. Washington State 20–13. Drive: 1 play, 10 yards, 0:07.
- STAN – Joshua Karty 31-yard field goal, 0:39. Washington State 20–16. Drive: 8 plays, 62 yards, 2:28.

Third quarter

- WSU – Max Borghi 2-yard run (Dean Janikowski kick), 4:34. Washington State 27–16. Drive: 7 plays, 66 yards, 3:29.

Fourth quarter

- STAN – Tanner McKee 1-yard run (Tanner McKee run), 14:06. Washington State 27–24. Drive: 9 plays, 74 yards, 5:28.
- STAN – Austin Jones 8-yard pass from Tanner McKee (Joshua Karty kick), 7:32. Stanford 31–27. Drive: 11 plays, 85 yards, 5:28.
- WSU – Max Borghi 2-yard run (Dean Janikowski kick), 1:30. Washington State 34–31. Drive: 6 plays, 70 yards, 1:56.

Top passers

- STAN – Tanner McKee – 23/32, 273 yards, 2 TD
- WSU – Jayden de Laura – 17/30, 289 yards, 3 TD

Top rushers

- STAN – Nathaniel Peat – 10 rushes, 27 yards
- WSU – Max Borghi – 17 rushes, 89 yards, 2 TD

Top receivers

- STAN – Benjamin Yurosek – 5 receptions, 99 yards, TD
- WSU – Lincoln Victor – 2 receptions, 73 yards

=== Washington ===
Washington Huskies vs. Stanford Cardinal – Game summary

Quarter	1	2	3	4	Total
Huskies	0	9	3	8	20
Cardinal	3	0	0	10	13

at Stanford Stadium • Stanford, CA

- Date: October 30, 2021
- Game time: 7:30 p.m. PDT
- Game weather: Cloudy, 58 °F (14 °C)
- Game attendance: 28,014
- Referee: Mark Duddy
- TV: FS1
- Reference

Game information

First quarter

- STAN – Joshua Karty 35-yard field goal, 7:56. Stanford 3–0. Drive: 13 plays, 58 yards, 7:04.

Second quarter

- UW – Peyton Henry 24-yard field goal, 14:07. Tied 3–3. Drive: 12 plays, 57 yards, 5:39.
- UW – Peyton Henry 37-yard field goal, 6:39. Washington 6–3. Drive: 8 plays, 50 yards, 4:37.
- UW – Peyton Henry 32-yard field goal, 0:00. Washington 9–3. Drive: 13 plays, 81 yards, 3:00.

Third quarter

- UW – Peyton Henry 35-yard field goal, 5:17. Washington 12–3. Drive: 6 plays, 18 yards, 2:37.

Fourth quarter

- STAN – Tanner McKee 1-yard run (Joshua Karty kick), 12:52. Washington 12–10. Drive: 16 plays, 75 yards, 7:25.
- STAN – Joshua Karty 43-yard field goal, 7:05. Stanford 13–12. Drive: 7 plays, 29 yards, 3:25.
- UW – Jalen McMillan 20-yard pass from Dylan Morris (Giles Jackson run), 0:21. Washington 20–13. Drive: 8 plays, 67 yards, 2:30.

Top passers

- UW – Dylan Morris – 17/25, 146 yards, TD
- STAN – Tanner McKee – 21/32, 194 yards, 2 int

Top rushers

- UW – Sean McGrew – 19 rushes, 114 yards
- STAN – Austin Jones – 16 rushes, 62 yards

Top receivers

- UW – Jalen McMillan – 6 receptions, 84 yards, TD
- STAN – Benjamin Yurosek – 6 receptions, 93 yards

=== Utah ===
Utah Utes vs. Stanford Cardinal – Game summary

Quarter	1	2	3	4	Total
Utes	14	24	0	14	52
Cardinal	0	0	7	0	7

at Stanford Stadium • Stanford, CA

- Date: November 5, 2021
- Game time: 7:30 p.m. PST
- Game weather: 58 °F (14 °C) Cloudy
- Game attendance: 26,410
- Referee: Francisco Villar
- TV announcers (FS1): Alex Faust, Petros Papadakis
- Reference

Game information

First quarter

- UTAH – Tavion Thomas 10-yard run (Jadon Redding kick), 10:57. Utah 7–0. Drive: 9 plays, 65 yards, 4:03.
- UTAH – Tavion Thomas 5-yard run (Jadon Redding kick), 6:15. Utah 14–0. Drive: 6 plays, 68 yards, 2:33.

Second quarter

- UTAH – Tavion Thomas 58-yard run (Jadon Redding kick), 14:31. Utah 21–0. Drive: 1 play, 58 yards, 0:12.
- UTAH – Tavion Thomas 11-yard run (Jadon Redding kick), 6:37. Utah 28–0. Drive: 10 plays, 90 yards, 4:17.
- UTAH – TJ Pledger 96-yard run (Jadon Redding kick), 3:10. Utah 35–0. Drive: 1 play, 96 yards, 0:16.
- UTAH – Jadon Redding 29-yard field goal, 0:00. Utah 38–0. Drive: 9 plays, 52 yards, 1:07.

Third quarter

- STAN – Isaiah Sanders 4-yard run (Joshua Karty kick), 10:14. Utah 38–7. Drive: 9 plays, 56 yards, 4:46.

Fourth quarter

- UTAH – Devin Lloyd 2-yard interception return (Jadon Redding kick), 12:11. Utah 45–7.
- UTAH – Micah Bernard 11-yard run (Jadon Redding kick), 1:48. Utah 52–7. Drive: 9 plays, 65 yards, 5:18.

Top passers

- UTAH – Cameron Rising – 13/22, 140 yards
- STAN – Jack West – 12/18, 59 yards, int

Top rushers

- UTAH – Tavion Thomas – 20 rushes, 177 yards, 4 TD
- STAN – E. J. Smith – 7 rushes, 53 yards

Top receivers

- UTAH – Micah Bernard – 2 receptions, 32 yards
- STAN – Benjamin Yurosek – 4 receptions, 42 yards

=== At Oregon State ===
Stanford Cardinal at Oregon State Beavers – Game summary

Quarter	1	2	3	4	Total
Cardinal	0	0	7	7	14
Beavers	7	7	14	7	35

at Reser Stadium • Corvallis, OR

- Date: November 13, 2021
- Game time: 2:40 pm
- Game weather: 59 °F (15 °C) Sunny, Wind: 5 mph SE
- Game attendance: 35,129
- Referee: Mike McCabe
- TV announcers (P12N): JB Long, Max Browne

Game information

Top passers

- STA – Ari Patu – 7/14, 51 yards, TD, INT
- ORE – Chance Nolan – 19/25, 257 yards, 2 TD

Top rushers

- STA – Isaiah Sanders – 9 carries, 37 yards
- ORE – B. J. Baylor – 23 carries, 80 yards, TD

Top receivers

- STA – Michael Wilson – 5 receptions, 50 yards
- ORE – Trevon Bradford – 3 receptions, 80 yards, TD

=== California ===
California Golden Bears vs. Stanford Cardinal – Game summary

Quarter	1	2	3	4	Total
Golden Bears	0	14	13	14	41
Cardinal	0	3	0	8	11

at Stanford Stadium • Stanford, CA

- Date: November 20, 2021
- Game time: 4:00 p.m.
- Game weather: 66 °F (19 °C), Sunny
- Game attendance: 49,265
- Referee: Steve Strimling
- TV announcers (P12N): Ted Robinson (play-by-play), Yogi Roth (analyst)

=== No. 6 Notre Dame ===
Notre Dame Fighting Irish vs. Stanford Cardinal – Game summary

Quarter	1	2	3	4	Total
No. 6 Fighting Irish	7	17	7	14	45
Cardinal	0	0	7	7	14

at Stanford Stadium • Stanford, CA

- Date: November 27, 2021
- Game time: 5:10 p.m.
- Game attendance: 31,571
- Referee: Gary Patterson
- TV announcers (FOX): Joe Davis (play-by-play), Brock Huard (analyst)

Game information

First quarter

- ND – Braden Lenzy 16-yard pass from Jack Coan (Jonathan Doerer kick), 9:39. Notre Dame 7–0. Drive: 5 plays, 74 yards, 3:00.

Second quarter

- ND – George Takacs 2-yard pass from Jack Coan (Jonathan Doerer kick), 14:30. Notre Dame 14–0. Drive: 9 plays, 69 yards, 3:40.
- ND – Jonathan Doerer 36-yard field goal, 11:27. Notre Dame 17–0. Drive: 4 plays, 5 yards, 2:23.
- ND – Kyren Williams 1-yard run (Jonathan Doerer kick), 4:47. Notre Dame 24–0. Drive: 12 plays, 75 yards, 1:35.

Third quarter

- STAN – Austin Jones 5-yard run (Joshua Karty kick), 13:06. Notre Dame 24–7. Drive: 2 plays, 13 yards, 0:39.
- ND – Jack Coan 1-yard run (Jonathan Doerer kick), 11:31. Notre Dame 31–7. Drive: 4 plays, 75 yards, 1:35.

Fourth quarter

- ND – Tyler Buchner 33-yard run (Jonathan Doerer kick), 14:33. Notre Dame 38–7. Drive: 3 plays, 72 yards, 0:35.
- STAN – Benjamin Yurosek 49-yard pass from Tanner McKee (Joshua Karty kick), 11:44. Notre Dame 38–14. Drive: 6 plays, 75 yards, 2:49.
- ND – Kyren Williams 12-yard run (Jonathan Doerer kick), 0:58. Notre Dame 45–14. Drive: 9 plays, 77 yards, 5:26.

Top passers

- ND – Jack Coan – 26/35, 345 yards, 2 TD, INT
- STAN – Tanner McKee – 20/25, 172 yards, TD

Top rushers

- ND – Kyren Williams – 19 carries, 74 yards, 2 TD
- STAN – Austin Jones – 9 carries, 35 yards, TD

Top receivers

- ND – Kevin Austin Jr. – 6 carries, 125 yards
- STAN – Benjamin Yurosek – 5 receptions, 87 yards, TD

== Rankings ==
Ranking movements Legend: ██ Increase in ranking ██ Decrease in ranking — = Not ranked RV = Received votes
	Week															
Poll	Pre	1	2	3	4	5	6	7	8	9	10	11	12	13	14	Final
AP	—	—	—	RV	RV	—	RV	—	—	—	—	—	—	—	—	—
Coaches	RV	RV	—	RV	RV	—	—	—	—	—	—	—	—	—	—	—
CFP	Not released									—	—	—	—	—	—	Not released

== Players drafted into the NFL ==
Round	Pick	Player	Position	NFL club
5	150	Thomas Booker	DT	Houston Texans
