= 2021 California Golden Bears football team =

American college football season

2021 California Golden Bears football
- Conference: Pac-12 Conference
- North Division
- Record: 5–7 (4–5 Pac-12)
- Head coach: Justin Wilcox (5th season)
- Offensive coordinator: Bill Musgrave (2nd season)
- Offensive scheme: Spread option
- Defensive coordinator: Peter Sirmon (2nd season)
- Base defense: 3–4 or 2–4–5
- Home stadium: California Memorial Stadium

2021 Pac-12 Conference football standings
	Conf.			Overall
Team	W		L	W		L
North Division
No. 22 Oregon xy	7	–	2	10	–	4
Washington State	6	–	3	7	–	6
Oregon State	5	–	4	7	–	6
California	4	–	5	5	–	7
Washington	3	–	6	4	–	8
Stanford	2	–	7	3	–	9
South Division
No. 12 Utah xy$	8	–	1	10	–	4
UCLA	6	–	3	8	–	4
Arizona State†	0	–	3	0	–	5
USC	3	–	6	4	–	8
Colorado	3	–	6	4	–	8
Arizona	1	–	8	1	–	11
Championship: Utah 38, Oregon 10
$ – Conference champion; x – Division champion/co-champions; y – Championship game participant; Rankings from AP Poll

The 2021 California Golden Bears football team represented the University of California, Berkeley during the 2021 NCAA Division I FBS football season. The team was led by head coach Justin Wilcox, in his fifth year. The team played their home games at California Memorial Stadium as a member of the North Division of the Pac-12 Conference.

== Schedule ==
Date	Time	Opponent	Site	TV	Result	Attendance
September 4	7:30 p.m.	Nevada*	California Memorial Stadium; Berkeley, CA	FS1	L 17–22	35,117
September 11	12:30 p.m.	at TCU*	Amon G. Carter Stadium; Fort Worth, TX	ESPNU	L 32–34	38,631
September 18	1:00 p.m.	Sacramento State*	California Memorial Stadium; Berkeley, CA	P12N	W 42–30	31,982
September 25	6:30 p.m.	at Washington	Husky Stadium; Seattle, WA	P12N	L 24–31 ^{OT}	60,104
October 2	2:30 p.m.	Washington State^{†}	California Memorial Stadium; Berkeley, CA	P12N	L 6–21	40,286
October 15	7:30 p.m.	at No. 9 Oregon	Autzen Stadium; Eugene, OR	ESPN	L 17–24	50,008
October 23	12:30 p.m.	Colorado	California Memorial Stadium; Berkeley, CA	P12N	W 26–3	36,264
October 30	4:00 p.m.	Oregon State	California Memorial Stadium; Berkeley, CA	P12N	W 39–25	38,572
November 6	12:00 p.m.	at Arizona	Arizona Stadium; Tucson, AZ	P12N	L 3–10	30,677
November 20	4:00 p.m.	at Stanford	Stanford Stadium; Stanford, CA (Big Game)	P12N	W 41–11	49,265
November 27	7:30 p.m.	at UCLA	Rose Bowl; Pasadena, CA (rivalry)	FS1	L 14–42	36,156
December 4 (Note: The USC–Cal game, originally scheduled for November 13 at 12:30 p.m., was postponed on November 9 due to a COVID-19 outbreak within the Cal football team. Later that day, it was rescheduled for December 4, with the kickoff time and broadcasting network announced on November 16.)	8:00 p.m.	USC	California Memorial Stadium; Berkeley, CA (Joe Roth Memorial Game)	FS1	W 24–14	42,076
*Non-conference game; ^{†}Homecoming; Rankings from AP Poll and CFP Rankings after November 2 released prior to game; All times are in Pacific time

== Game summaries ==
=== vs Nevada ===
Nevada Wolf Pack vs California Golden Bears – Game summary

Quarter	1	2	3	4	Total
Wolf Pack	0	13	9	0	22
Golden Bears	14	0	0	3	17

at California Memorial Stadium • Berkeley, CA

- Date: September 4, 2021
- Game time: 7:30 p.m. PDT
- Game weather: 64 °F (18 °C) Clear
- Game attendance: 35,117
- Referee: Steven Strimling
- TV announcers (FS1): Alex Faust (play-by-play) and Petros Papadakis (analyst)
- Game Book

Game information

First quarter

- CAL – Damien Moore 1-yard run (Dario Longhetto kick), 5:47. CAL 7–0. Drive: 15 plays, 63 yards, 9:05.
- CAL – Nikko Remigio 2-yard pass from Chase Garbers (Dario Longhetto kick), 0:03. CAL 14–0. Drive: 9 plays, 72 yards, 4:08.

Second quarter

- NEV – Brandon Talton 44-yard field goal, 10:50. CAL 14–3. Drive: 9 plays, 56 yards, 4:10.
- NEV – Romeo Doubs 43-yard pass from Carson Strong (Brandon Talton kick), 6:15. CAL 14–10. Drive: 5 plays, 68 yards, 1:57.
- NEV – Brandon Talton 35-yard field goal, 0:02. CAL 14–13. Drive: 7 plays, 23 yards, 0:44.

Third quarter

- NEV – Elijah Cooks 16-yard pass from Carson Strong (2pt pass fail), 12:00. NEV 19–14. Drive: 7 plays, 75 yards, 2:52.
- NEV – Brandon Talton 49-yard field goal, 6:26. NEV 22–14. Drive: 9 plays, 25 yards, 3:40.

Fourth quarter

- CAL – Dario Longhetto 24-yard field goal, 12:59. NEV 22–17. Drive: 9 plays, 64 yards, 3:10.

Top passers

- NEV – Carson Strong – 22/39, 312 yards, 2 TD, int
- CAL – Chase Garbers – 25/38, 177 yards, TD, int

Top rushers

- NEV – Toa Taua – 10 rushes, 37 yards
- CAL – Damien Moore – 15 rushes, 79 yards, TD

Top receivers

- NEV – Tory Horton – 3 receptions, 94 yards
- CAL – Jeremiah Hunter – 2 receptions, 35 yards

=== At TCU ===
California Golden Bears at TCU Horned Frogs – Game summary

Quarter	1	2	3	4	Total
Golden Bears	6	13	0	13	32
Horned Frogs	0	14	7	13	34

at Amon G. Carter Stadium • Fort Worth, TX

- Date: September 11, 2021
- Game time: 12:30 p.m. PDT
- Game weather: Temperature: 90 °F (32 °C) • Weather: Sunny
- Game attendance: 38,631
- Referee: Michael Vandervelde
- TV announcers (ESPNU): Kevin Brown, Hutson Mason

Game information

First quarter

Second quarter

Third quarter

Fourth quarter

Top passers

Top rushers

Top receivers

=== vs Sacramento State ===
Sacramento State Hornets vs California Golden Bears – Game summary

Quarter	1	2	3	4	Total
Hornets	6	0	14	10	30
Golden Bears	14	7	14	7	42

at California Memorial Stadium • Berkeley, CA

- Date: September 18, 2021
- Game time: 1:00 p.m. PDT
- Game attendance: 31,982
- Referee: Mark Duddy
- TV announcers (P12N): Jim Kozimor (play by play), Bob Davie (analyst)

Game information

First quarter
Second quarter
Third quarter
Fourth quarter

Top passers

Top rushers

Top receivers

=== At Washington ===
California Golden Bears at Washington Huskies – Game summary

Quarter	1	2	3	4	OT	Total
Golden Bears	7	3	7	7	0	24
Huskies	7	14	3	0	7	31

at Husky Stadium • Seattle, WA

- Date: September 25, 2021
- Game time: 6:30 p.m. PDT
- Game weather: Temperature: 74 °F (23 °C) • Weather: Sunny • Wind: N 4 mph
- Game attendance: 60,104
- Referee: Mike McCabe
- TV announcers (P12N): Guy Haberman (play by play), Shane Vereen (analyst)

Game information

Top passers

- CAL – Chase Garbers – 30/41, 319 yards, 2 TD, 2 INT
- UW – Dylan Morris – 19/32, 234 yards, 2 TD

Top rushers

- CAL – Chase Garbers – 16 carries, 71 yards, TD
- UW – Sean McGraw – 16 carries, 53 yards, 2 TD

Top receiving

- CAL – Kekoa Crawford – 8 receptions, 107 yards
- UW – Devin Culp – 5 receptions, 81 yards

=== vs Washington State ===
Homecoming Game

Washington State Cougars vs California Golden Bears – Game summary

Quarter	1	2	3	4	Total
Cougars	14	0	7	0	21
Golden Bears	6	0	0	0	6

at California Memorial Stadium • Berkeley, CA

- Date: October 2, 2021
- Game time: 2:30 p.m. PDT
- Game weather: 82 °F (28 °C) Sunny
- Game attendance: 40,286
- Referee: Francisco Villar
- TV announcers (P12N): Matt Chazanow (play-by-play), Alex Brink (analyst), Jessamyn McIntyre (sideline)

=== At No. 9 Oregon ===
California Golden Bears at No. 9 Oregon Ducks – Game summary

Quarter	1	2	3	4	Total
Golden Bears	7	0	3	7	17
No. 9 Ducks	3	7	0	14	24

at Autzen Stadium • Eugene, OR

- Date: October 15, 2021
- Game time: 7:30 p.m. PDT
- Game weather: 61 °F (16 °C) Clear
- Game attendance: 50,008
- Referee: Steven Strimling
- TV announcers (ESPN): Beth Mowins (play by play), Kirk Morrison (analyst), Dawn Davenport (sideline)

Game information

First quarter

- (10:42) ORE – Camden Lewis 49-yard field goal (Drive: 7 plays, 39 yards, 4:18; Oregon 3–0)
- (5:23) CAL – Jake Tonges 9-yard pass from Chase Garbers, Dario Longhetto kick (Drive: 13 plays, 75 yards, 5:19; California 7–3)

Second quarter

- (5:17) ORE – Travis Dye 11-yard run, Camden Lewis kick (Drive: 7 plays, 67 yards, 2:52; Oregon 10–7)

Third quarter

- (8:34) CAL – Dario Longhetto 45-yard field goal (Drive: 8 plays, 52 yards, 3:02; Tied 10–10)

Fourth quarter

- (13:37) CAL – Gavin Reinwald 4-yard pass from Chase Garbers, Dario Longhetto kick (Drive: 11 plays, 80 yards, 5:46; California 17–10)
- (11:23) ORE – Jaylon Redd 20-yard pass from Anthony Brown, Camden Lewis kick (Drive: 5 plays, 62 yards, 2:14; Tied 17–17)
- (4:50) ORE – Anthony Brown 11-yard run, Camden Lewis kick (Drive: 7 plays, 70 yards, 4:00; Oregon 24–17)

Top passers

- CAL – Chase Garbers – 25/44, 247 yards, 2 TD
- ORE – Anthony Brown – 20/28, 244 yards, TD

Top rushers

- CAL – Christopher Brooks – 14 carries, 68 yards
- ORE – Travis Dye – 19 carries, 145 yards, TD

Top receivers

- CAL – Jeremiah Hunter – 3 receptions, 78 yards
- ORE – Travis Dye – 7 receptions, 73 yards

=== vs Colorado ===
Colorado Buffaloes vs California Golden Bears – Game summary

Quarter	1	2	3	4	Total
Buffaloes	0	3	0	0	3
Golden Bears	10	13	0	3	26

at California Memorial Stadium • Berkeley, CA

- Date: October 23, 2021
- Game time: 12:30 p.m. PDT
- Game weather: 62 °F (17 °C) Cloudy
- Game attendance: 36,264
- Referee: Mike McCabe
- TV announcers (P12N): Roxy Bernstein (play by play), Lincoln Kennedy (analyst)
- Game Book

Game information

First quarter

- CAL – Dario Longhetto 49-yard field goal, 9:42. CAL 3–0. Drive: 8 plays, 53 yards, 3:12.
- CAL – Keleki Latu 24-yard pass from Chase Garbers (Dario Longhetto kick), 6:05. CAL 10–0. Drive: 3 plays, 50 yards, 1:21.

Second quarter

- CAL – Dario Longhetto 30-yard field goal, 9:23. CAL 13–0. Drive: 14 plays, 68 yards, 7:08.
- CU – Cole Becker 33-yard field goal, 6:41. CAL 13–3. Drive: 6 plays, 18 yards, 2:32.
- CAL – Gavin Reinwald 31-yard pass from Chase Garbers (Dario Longhetto kick), 3:21. CAL 20–3. Drive: 6 plays, 66 yards, 3:13.
- CAL – Dario Longhetto 51-yard field goal, 0:00. CAL 23–3. Drive: 7 plays, 50 yards, 0:58.

Third quarter

- No scoring.

Fourth quarter

- CAL – Dario Longhetto 33-yard field goal, 4:56. CAL 26–3. Drive: 11 plays, 57 yards, 5:32.

Top passers

- CU – Brendon Lewis – 9/17, 69 yards, int
- CAL – Chase Garbers – 22/30, 225 yards, 2 TD

Top rushers

- CU – Jarek Broussard – 11 rushes, 28 yards
- CAL – Chase Garbers – 10 rushes, 96 yards

Top receivers

- CU – Jarek Broussard – 3 receptions, 30 yards
- CAL – Keleki Latu – 3 receptions, 36 yards, TD

=== vs Oregon State ===
Oregon State Beavers vs California Golden Bears – Game summary

Quarter	1	2	3	4	Total
Beavers	0	10	7	8	25
Golden Bears	10	7	14	8	39

at California Memorial Stadium • Berkeley, CA

- Date: October 30, 2021
- Game time: 4:00 p.m. PDT
- Game weather: 61 °F (16 °C) Cloudy • Wind: SW 12 mph
- Game attendance: 38,572
- Referee: Chris Coyte
- TV announcers (P12N): Ted Robinson (play by play), Yogi Roth (analyst)

Game information

First quarter
Second quarter
Third quarter
Fourth quarter

Top passers

- OSU – Chance Nolan – 15/26, 243 yards, 2 TD, 2 INT
- CAL – Chase Garbers – 17/26, 262 yards, 3 TD

Top rushers

- OSU – Deshaun Fenwick – 10 rushes, 48 yards, TD
- CAL – Damien Moore – 11 rushes, 111 yards, TD

Top receivers

- OSU – Trevon Bradford – 6 receptions, 124 yards, 2 TD
- CAL – Trevon Clark – 5 reception, 90 yards, TD

=== At Arizona ===
California Golden Bears at Arizona Wildcats – Game summary

Quarter	1	2	3	4	Total
Golden Bears	0	0	3	0	3
Wildcats	0	0	3	7	10

at Arizona Stadium • Tucson, AZ

- Date: November 6, 2021
- Game time: 12:00 p.m. PDT
- Game weather: 84 °F (29 °C) • Weather: Sunny
- Game attendance: 30,677
- Referee: Mark Duddy
- TV announcers (P12N): Roxy Bernstein (play by play), Lincoln Kennedy (analyst)

Game information

First quarter

- No scoring plays

Second quarter

- No scoring plays

Third quarter

- (5:46) ARIZ – Tyler Loop 29-yard field goal (Drive: 10 plays, 61 yards, 5:07; Arizona 3–0)
- (2:09) CAL – Nick Lopez 34-yard field goal (Drive: 9 plays, 59 yards, 3:37; Tied 3–3)

Fourth quarter

- (2:17) ARIZ – Michael Wiley 10-yard run, Tyler Loop kick (Drive: 8 plays, 55 yards, 2:39; Arizona 10–3)

Top passers

- CAL – Ryan Glover – 11/29, 94 yards
- ARIZ – Will Plummer – 16/28, 129 yards, 2 INT

Top rushers

- CAL – Christopher Brooks – 11 carries, 31 yards
- ARIZ – Will Plummer – 11 carries, 68 yards

Top receivers

- CAL – Kekoa Crawford – 5 receptions, 56 yards
- ARIZ – Dorian Singer – 5 receptions, 46 yards

=== At Stanford ===
California Golden Bears at Stanford Cardinal – Game summary

Quarter	1	2	3	4	Total
Golden Bears	0	14	13	14	41
Cardinal	0	3	0	8	11

at Stanford Stadium • Stanford, CA

- Date: November 20, 2021
- Game time: 4:00 p.m. PST
- Game weather: 66 °F (19 °C) Sunny
- Game attendance: 49,265
- Referee: Steve Strimling
- TV announcers (P12N): Ted Robinson (play by play), Yogi Roth (analyst)

=== At UCLA ===
California Golden Bears at UCLA Bruins – Game summary

Quarter	1	2	3	4	Total
Golden Bears	0	14	0	0	14
Bruins	3	14	10	15	42

at Rose Bowl • Pasadena, CA

- Date: November 27, 2021
- Game time: 7:30 p.m. PST
- Game weather: 60 °F (16 °C) Clear
- Game attendance: 36,156
- Referee: Mike McCabe
- TV announcers (FS1): Aaron Goldsmith (play by play), Mark Helfrich (analyst)
- Game Book

Game information

First quarter

- UCLA – Nicholas Barr-Mira 41-yard field goal, 9:33. UCLA 3–0. Drive: 9 plays, 47 yards, 3:29.

Second quarter

- UCLA – Kyle Philips 4-yard pass from Dorian Thompson-Robinson (Nicholas Barr-Mira kick), 14:10. UCLA 10–0. Drive: 9 plays, 40 yards, 4:05.
- CAL – Christopher Brooks 14-yard run (Dario Longhetto kick), 8:58. UCLA 10–7. Drive: 11 plays, 75 yards, 5:12.
- CAL – Chase Garbers 1-yard run (Dario Longhetto kick), 7:00. CAL 14–10. Drive: 4 plays, 13 yards, 1:54.
- UCLA – Kazmeir Allen 8-yard run (Nicholas Barr-Mira kick), 0:26. UCLA 17–14. Drive: 13 plays, 64 yards, 6:29.

Third quarter

- UCLA – Greg Dulcich 29-yard pass from Dorian Thompson-Robinson (Nicholas Barr-Mira kick), 11:19. UCLA 24–14. Drive: 3 plays, 71 yards, 1:09.
- UCLA – Nicholas Barr-Mira 46-yard field goal, 2:25. UCLA 27–14. Drive: 13 plays, 52 yards, 5:26.

Fourth quarter

- UCLA – Zach Charbonnet 1-yard run (Thompson-Robinson pass to Charbonnet), 13:10. UCLA 35–14. Drive: 6 plays, 80 yards, 2:19.
- UCLA – Kyle Philips 4-yard pass from Dorian Thompson-Robinson (Nicholas Barr-Mira kick), 8:53. UCLA 42–14. Drive: 7 plays, 56 yards, 2:41.

Top passers

- CAL – Chase Garbers – 16/31, 125 yards, 2 int
- UCLA – Dorian Thompson-Robinson – 19/28, 164 yards, 3 TD

Top rushers

- CAL – Christopher Brooks – 12 rushes, 61 yards, TD
- UCLA – Zach Charbonnet – 22 rushes, 106 yards, TD

Top receivers

- CAL – Kekoa Crawford – 5 receptions, 42 yards
- UCLA – Greg Dulcich – 6 receptions, 86 yards, TD

=== vs USC ===
USC Trojans vs California Golden Bears – Game summary

Quarter	1	2	3	4	Total
Trojans	0	7	0	7	14
Golden Bears	3	14	0	7	24

at California Memorial Stadium • Berkeley, CA

- Date: December 4, 2021
- Game time: 8:00 p.m. PST
- Game weather: 50 °F (10 °C) Mostly Cloudy
- Game attendance: 42,076
- Referee: Matthew Richards
- TV announcers (FS1): Tim Brando (play by play), Spencer Tillman (analyst)

Game information

First Quarter

- (2:12) CAL – Dario Longhetto 22-yard field goal (Drive: 14 plays, 62 yards, 7:54; California 3–0)

Second Quarter

- (9:28) USC – Kyle Ford 45-yard pass from Jaxson Dart, Parker Lewis kick (Drive: 6 plays, 91 yards, 2:40; USC 7–3)
- (4:51) CAL – Christopher Brooks 1-yard run, Dario Longhetto kick (Drive: 8 plays, 79 yards, 4:31; California 10–7)
- (3:53) CAL – Trey Paster 55-yard fumble recovery, Dario Longhetto kick (California 17–7)

Third Quarter

No scoring plays

Fourth Quarter

- (5:37) CAL – Christopher Brooks 2-yard run, Dario Longhetto kick (Drive: 8 plays, 65 yards, 4:10; California 24–7)
- (1:36) USC – K. D. Nixon 16-yard pass from Miller Moss, Parker Lewis kick (Drive: 14 plays, 87 yards, 3:55; California 24–14)

Top passers

- USC – Jaxson Dart – 17/26, 191 yards, TD
- CAL – Chase Garbers – 18/21, 177 yards

Top rushers

- USC – Vavae Malepeai – 18 carries, 107 yards
- CAL – Christopher Brooks – 14 carries, 49 yards, 2 TD

Top receivers

- USC – Michael Jackson III – 6 receptions, 73 yards
- CAL – Trevon Clark – 4 receptions, 54 yards
