= 2021 Pac-12 Football Championship Game =

- Conference championship
Oregon Ducks	Utah Utes
(10–2)	(9–3)
10	38
Head coach: Mario Cristobal	Head coach: Kyle Whittingham
AP / Coaches / CFP; 10 / 10 / 10	AP / Coaches / CFP; 14 / 17 / 17
	1	2	3	4	Total
Oregon	0	0	3	7	10
Utah	14	9	8	7	38
- Date: December 3, 2021
- Season: 2021
- Stadium: Allegiant Stadium
- Location: Paradise, NV
- MVP: LB Devin Lloyd, Utah
- Favorite: Utah by 3
- Referee: Steven Strimling
- Attendance: 56,511

United States TV coverage
- Network: ABC, ESPN Radio
- Announcers: ABC: Chris Fowler (play-by-play), Kirk Herbstreit (color), Holly Rowe (sideline); ESPN Radio: Jorge Sedano, Max Starks

International TV coverage
- Network: ESPN Brazil
- Announcers: Matheus Pinheiro (play-by-play), Weinny Eirado (analyst)

2021 Pac-12 Conference football standings
	Conf.			Overall
Team	W		L	W		L
North Division
No. 22 Oregon xy	7	–	2	10	–	4
Washington State	6	–	3	7	–	6
Oregon State	5	–	4	7	–	6
California	4	–	5	5	–	7
Washington	3	–	6	4	–	8
Stanford	2	–	7	3	–	9
South Division
No. 12 Utah xy$	8	–	1	10	–	4
UCLA	6	–	3	8	–	4
Arizona State†	0	–	3	0	–	5
USC	3	–	6	4	–	8
Colorado	3	–	6	4	–	8
Arizona	1	–	8	1	–	11
Championship: Utah 38, Oregon 10
$ – Conference champion; x – Division champion/co-champions; y – Championship game participant; Rankings from AP Poll

The 2021 Pac-12 Football Championship Game was a college football game played on December 3, 2021, at Allegiant Stadium in Paradise, Nevada. It was the 11th edition of the Pac-12 Football Championship Game, and determined the champion of the Pac-12 Conference for the 2021 season. The game began at 5:00 p.m. PST and aired on ABC. The contest featured the Oregon Ducks, the North Division champions, and the Utah Utes, the South Division champions. Sponsored by gas station chain 76, the game was officially known as the Pac-12 Football Championship Game presented by 76. Utah defeated Oregon, 38–10, to win the Pac-12 Championship.

== Teams ==
The 2021 Pac–12 Football Championship Game featured the Oregon Ducks, champions of the North Division, against the Utah Utes, champions of the South Division. This was the teams' 35th all-time meeting; they first met in 1933 and have played annually as Pac-12 foes since 2013. Oregon enters the game leading the series 23–11. This is a rematch of a conference game that happened 2 weeks earlier; in which Utah won 38–7.

This was Oregon's fifth appearance in the title game; entering the game, they lead all teams by number of appearances and were the first team to ever appear in three consecutive championship games. They were 4–0 in previous games, with wins in 2011, 2014, 2019, and 2020. Utah made their third appearance; they were 0–2 following losses in 2018 and 2019.

=== Oregon ===
Led by fourth-year head coach Mario Cristobal, Oregon opened their season ranked No. 11 in the AP Poll, and they defeated Fresno State in their first game by a touchdown. The Ducks then travelled to Columbus for their second game to face the No. 3 Ohio State Buckeyes, whom they defeated by a touchdown as well, vaulting them into the top four. Oregon rounded out their non-conference schedule with a dominant win over FCS Stony Brook before opening Pac-12 play with another dominant win over Arizona. Oregon's first loss came the following week on the road against Stanford in overtime, which led them into a bye week. The Ducks returned to play on Friday night against California and the following week against UCLA, both of which resulted in slim, one-possession Oregon victories. Oregon returned to the No. 4 spot in the AP Poll following their next win, against Colorado, before beating Washington on the road to reach No. 3. The Ducks then defeated Washington State before facing No. 23 Utah, their second ranked opponent of the year. Utah dominated the game, defeating Oregon 38–7. The Ducks, now No. 11, finished the regular season with a home win against rivals Oregon State by nine points; this victory clinched the North Division title for Oregon and booked their spot in the championship game.

=== Utah ===
The Utah Utes, led by head coach Kyle Whittingham in his 17th season, opened their season ranked No. 24 in the AP Poll, and defeated Weber State – ranked No. 6 in the FCS STATS Poll – to begin the year. Notably, the Utes' season-opener produced a crowd of over 51,000, a new record for Rice-Eccles Stadium. A pair of road losses followed, however, as the Utes were "stunned" by BYU in a six-point loss and fell to San Diego State by two points in triple overtime. Utah returned to winning ways shortly thereafter, defeating Washington State on homecoming and, following a bye week, taking down USC – snapping a 106-year winless streak in the city of Los Angeles – and No. 18 Arizona State, each by two possessions, to re-establish a winning record. Utah would falter in their next game, a road contest against Oregon State, but finished the month of October with a victory over UCLA at home. To begin November, Utah soundly defeated Stanford and beat Arizona by two possessions, both on the road, before returning home to face No. 3 Oregon. The Utes pulled an upset, by 31 points, and clinched the South Division title with the win, solidifying their place in their third championship game in the last four seasons.

== Game summary ==
=== First half ===
Scheduled for a 5:00 p.m. PST start, Oregon kicker Camden Lewis put the ball into play to begin the game at 5:15 p.m. The opening kickoff was returned by Britain Covey to the Utah 39-yard-line. Utah was held to a 4th & 1 a few plays into the drive, but converted to continue the possession. Several plays later, Cameron Rising found Covey for a 22-yard pass to enter the red zone, and Tavion Thomas scored on a two-yard rush three plays later. Oregon's, on their opening drive of the contest, was unable to reach midfield, and they punted at their own 44-yard-line. Utah's next drive ended similarly; after a holding penalty set the Utes back ten yards on their first play, the drive stalled, and the Utes punted the ball back to Oregon. Beginning their possession on their own 15-yard-line, Oregon quarterback Anthony Brown gained a first down on the drive's first play, but would throw an interception just three plays later, which would be returned for a touchdown by Utah linebacker Devin Lloyd, increasing Utah's lead to 14–0. Getting the ball right back, Oregon was again unable to be productive on offense. A pass interference penalty on 3rd & 5 forced a 4th & 24 the next play, and Tom Snee punted the ball away for the Ducks for the third time. The Ducks' defense stepped up soon afterwards, though; on Utah's ensuing drive, Cameron Rising's pass was intercepted by linebacker Noah Sewell, giving Oregon the ball at their own 46-yard-line.

The first play of Oregon's ensuing drive saw them reach Utah territory for the first time in the game; they made it to the Utah 26-yard-line but were unable to capitalize as Camden Lewis missed a 44-yard field goal and gave Utah the ball back. The Utes were able to string together a long drive of their own, gaining 44 yards in 11 plays, but it ended with another interception, this one by Verone McKinley III at the Oregon 20-yard-line. The Ducks couldn't capitalize, as they went three-and-out on their next drive and punted it back to the Utes. Utah got the ball at their own 26-yard-line as a result; their next drive spanned 74 yards in 12 plays, and finished with an 11-yard touchdown pass from Cameron Rising to Dalton Kincaid. This increased the Utes' lead to 20 points, as the two-point conversion pass was unsuccessful. Getting the ball back with 27 seconds before halftime, Oregon opted to run plays rather than kneeling the ball in an attempt to score, though this strategy backfired as Anthony Brown threw a pass which was intercepted by Malone Mataele on the Oregon 37-yard-line with eight seconds to play. Utah was able to gain five yards before attempting a 50-yard field goal, which was successful. Utah entered halftime with a 23–0 lead.

=== Second half ===
Oregon received the ball to start the second half as Jordan Noyes' kickoff resulted in a touchback. This drive saw Brown and Dye gain a majority of Oregon's yards and saw the Ducks score their first points of the contest with a 42-yard field goal made by Camden Lewis. The teams then traded punts on each of their next drives, as Utah went three-and-out after gaining seven yards on their three plays, while Oregon fumbled for a loss of thirteen yards and went three-and-out after finishing the drive with a net loss of nine total yards. Taking possession at the Oregon 45-yard-line, Utah was quick to capitalize on the excellent field position. After an incomplete pass to start the series, Rising rushed for 41 yards, advancing the ball to the Oregon 4-yard-line, and T.J. Pledger scored on a rushing touchdown the next play. Oregon found themselves unable to respond with another score of their own, as they couldn't convert a 4th & 4 at the Utah 38-yard-line and turned the ball over on downs. On the final four plays of the quarter, Utah reached Oregon territory before the clock expired, and began the fourth quarter with a 2nd & 2 at the Oregon 33-yard-line.

Eight Utah plays followed before the Utes found the end zone for the final time in the game; a 3-yard rush by Tavion Thomas put the Utes up 38–3 with ten minutes to play. The ensuing kickoff saw Seven McGee return the ball to the Oregon 45-yard-line, but a holding penalty brought the ball all the way back to the Oregon 10-yard-line. The Ducks put up a 12-play drive spanning just over five minutes while converting two third downs en route to their first, and only, touchdown of the game by way of a 2-yard Travis Dye rush. Oregon's onside kick was unsuccessful, and Utah recovered the ball at the Oregon 37-yard-line. The Utes were able to run the final five minutes off the clock and secure a 38–10 win and the Pac-12 Championship.

=== Scoring summary ===
2021 Pac-12 Football Championship Game presented by 76

Quarter	1	2	3	4	Total
No. 10 Oregon	0	0	3	7	10
No. 17 Utah	14	9	8	7	38

at Allegiant Stadium • Paradise, Nevada

- Date: December 3, 2021
- Game time: 5:00 p.m. PST
- Game weather: n/a (game played indoors)
- Game attendance: 56,511
- Referee: Steven Strimling
- TV announcers (ABC): Chris Fowler (play-by-play), Kirk Herbstreit (analyst), Holly Rowe (sideline)

Scoring summary

Quarter	Time	Drive			Team	Scoring information	Score	
Quarter	Time	Plays	Yards	TOP	Team	Scoring information	Oregon	Utah
1	10:47	10	61	4:03	Utah	Tavion Thomas 3-yard touchdown run, Jadon Redding kick good	0	7
1	4:16				Utah	Interception returned 34 yards for touchdown by Devin Lloyd, Jadon Redding kick good	0	14
2	0:27	12	74	3:37	Utah	Dalton Kincaid 11-yard touchdown reception from Cameron Rising, 2-point pass incomplete	0	20
2	0:00	2	5	0:08	Utah	50-yard field goal by Jadon Redding	0	23
3	10:32	9	51	4:28	Oregon	42-yard field goal by Camden Lewis	3	23
3	6:33	3	45	0:26	Utah	T.J. Pledger 4-yard touchdown run, 2-point run good	3	31
4	10:21	11	62	6:32	Utah	Tavion Thomas 3-yard touchdown run, Jadon Redding kick good	3	38
4	5:17	12	90	4:57	Oregon	Travis Dye 2-yard touchdown run, Camden Lewis kick good	10	38
"TOP" = time of possession. For other American football terms, see Glossary of American football.							10	38

== Statistics ==
=== Team statistics ===
Team statistical comparison
Statistic	Oregon	Utah
First downs	14	21
First downs rushing	7	11
First downs passing	5	7
First downs penalty	2	3
Third down efficiency	4–12	6–13
Fourth down efficiency	0–1	3–3
Total plays–net yards	53–221	64–361
Rushing attempts–net yards	29–74	40–191
Yards per rush	2.6	4.8
Yards passing	147	170
Pass completions–attempts	13–24	15–24
Interceptions thrown	2	2
Punt returns–total yards	1–3	3–12
Kickoff returns–total yards	5–83	2–49
Punts–total yardage	4–178	2–107
Fumbles–lost	3–0	2–0
Penalties–yards	9–86	10–89
Time of possession	27:56	32:04

=== Individual statistics ===
Oregon statistics
Ducks passing
	C–A	Yds	TD	INT
Anthony Brown	13–24	147	0	2
Ducks rushing
	Car	Yds	TD	Avg
Travis Dye	15	82	1	5.5
Seven McGee	2	8	0	4.0
Byron Cardwell	1	2	0	2.0
Anthony Brown	10	−5	0	−0.5
TEAM	1	−13		
Ducks receiving
	Rec	Yds	TD	Avg
Isaah Crocker	3	51	0	17.0
Travis Dye	4	27	0	6.8
Seven McGee	1	19	0	19.0
Devon Williams	1	17	0	17.0
Troy Franklin	1	16	0	16.0
Kris Hutson	1	6	0	6.0
Byron Caldwell	1	6	0	6.0
Terrance Ferguson	1	5	0	5.0

Utah statistics
Utes passing
	C–A	Yds	TD	INT
Cameron Rising	15–24	170	1	2
Utes rushing
	Car	Yds	TD	Avg
Tavion Thomas	18	63	2	3.5
Cameron Rising	9	61	0	6.8
Micah Bernard	6	38	0	6.3
T.J. Pledger	5	20	1	4.0
Chris Curry	2	9	0	4.5
Utes receiving
	Rec	Yds	TD	Avg
Britain Covey	5	72	0	14.4
Dalton Kincaid	4	61	1	15.3
Solomon Enis	1	13	0	13.0
Brant Kuithe	1	12	0	12.0
Devaughn Vele	2	10	0	5.0
Theo Howard	1	6	0	6.0
Tavion Thomas	1	−4	0	−4.0

== See also ==
- List of Pac-12 Conference football champions
