= 2021 Washington Huskies football team =

American college football season

2021 Washington Huskies football
- Conference: Pac-12 Conference
- North Division
- Record: 4–8 (3–6 Pac-12)
- Head coach: Jimmy Lake (2nd season; first 9 games); Bob Gregory (interim; final 3 games)
- Offensive coordinator: John Donovan (2nd season)
- Offensive scheme: Multiple
- Defensive coordinator: Bob Gregory (1st season)
- Co-defensive coordinator: Ikaika Malloe (2nd season)
- Base defense: 4–2–5
- Home stadium: Husky Stadium

Uniform
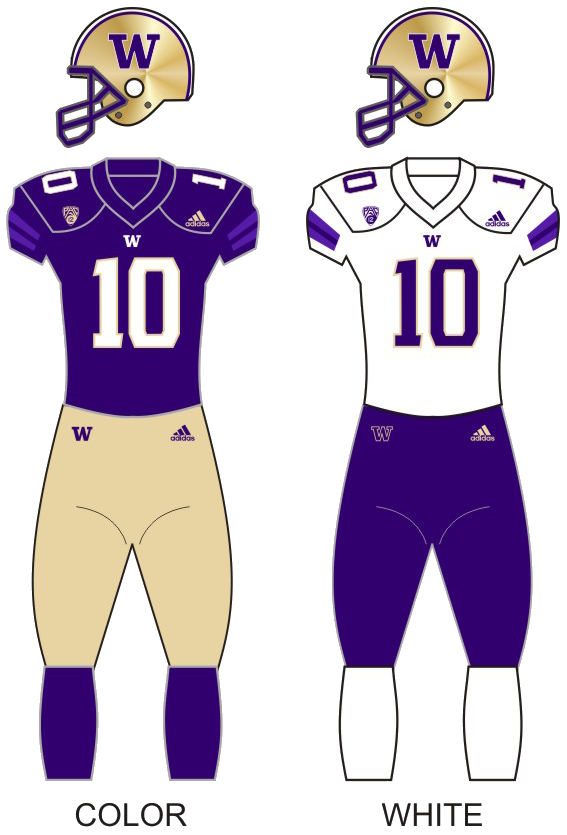

2021 Pac-12 Conference football standings
	Conf.			Overall
Team	W		L	W		L
North Division
No. 22 Oregon xy	7	–	2	10	–	4
Washington State	6	–	3	7	–	6
Oregon State	5	–	4	7	–	6
California	4	–	5	5	–	7
Washington	3	–	6	4	–	8
Stanford	2	–	7	3	–	9
South Division
No. 12 Utah xy$	8	–	1	10	–	4
UCLA	6	–	3	8	–	4
Arizona State†	0	–	3	0	–	5
USC	3	–	6	4	–	8
Colorado	3	–	6	4	–	8
Arizona	1	–	8	1	–	11
Championship: Utah 38, Oregon 10
$ – Conference champion; x – Division champion/co-champions; y – Championship game participant; Rankings from AP Poll

The 2021 Washington Huskies football team represented the University of Washington during the 2021 NCAA Division I FBS football season. The Huskies were led by second year head coach Jimmy Lake for the first ten games. The team announced a new head coach, Kalen DeBoer, on November 30. The Huskies finished with their first losing season since 2009. The Huskies played their home games at Husky Stadium in Seattle, Washington, and competed in the North Division of the Pac-12 Conference.

== Schedule ==
Date	Time	Opponent	Rank	Site	TV	Result	Attendance
September 4	5:00 p.m.	No. 9 (FCS) Montana*	No. 20	Husky Stadium; Seattle, WA	P12N	L 7–13	64,053
September 11	5:00 p.m.	at Michigan*		Michigan Stadium; Ann Arbor, MI	ABC	L 10–31	108,345
September 18	1:15 p.m.	Arkansas State*		Husky Stadium; Seattle, WA	P12N	W 52–3	58,772
September 25	6:30 p.m.	California		Husky Stadium; Seattle, WA	P12N	W 31–24 ^{OT}	60,104
October 2	6:00 p.m.	at Oregon State		Reser Stadium; Corvallis, OR	P12N	L 24–27	33,733
October 16	5:30 p.m.	UCLA^{†}		Husky Stadium; Seattle, WA	FOX	L 17–24	62,266
October 22	7:30 p.m.	at Arizona		Arizona Stadium; Tucson, AZ	ESPN2	W 21–16	30,880
October 30	7:30 p.m.	at Stanford		Stanford Stadium; Stanford, CA	FS1	W 20–13	28,014
November 6	4:30 p.m.	No. 4 Oregon		Husky Stadium; Seattle, WA (rivalry)	ABC	L 16–26	63,193
November 13	4:00 p.m.	Arizona State		Husky Stadium; Seattle, WA	FS1	L 30–35	57,858
November 20	12:00 p.m.	at Colorado		Folsom Field; Boulder, CO	P12N	L 17–20	41,284
November 26	5:00 p.m.	Washington State		Husky Stadium; Seattle, WA (Apple Cup)	FS1	L 13–40	68,077
*Non-conference game; ^{†}Homecoming; Rankings from AP Poll and CFP Rankings after November 2 released prior to game; All times are in Pacific time; Source:

== Game summaries ==
=== vs No. 9 (FCS) Montana ===
Montana Grizzlies vs Washington Huskies – Game summary

Quarter	1	2	3	4	Total
No. 9 (FCS) Grizzlies	3	0	0	10	13
No. 20 Huskies	7	0	0	0	7

at Husky Stadium • Seattle, WA

- Date: September 4, 2021
- Game time: 5:00 p.m. PDT
- Game weather: 77 °F (25 °C) Sunny
- Game attendance: 64,053
- Referee: Matthew Richards
- TV announcers (P12N): J. B. Long (play-by-play) and Max Browne (analyst)

Game information

First quarter

- UW – Dylan Morris 1-yard run (Peyton Henry kick), 10:09. Washington 7–0. Drive: 9 plays, 78 yards, 4:45.
- MONT – Kevin Macias 26-yard field goal, 7:08. Washington 7–3. Drive: 8 plays, 66 yards, 3:01.

Second quarter

- No scoring.

Third quarter

- No scoring.

Fourth quarter

- MONT – Camron Humphrey 4-yard run (Kevin Macias kick), 10:35. Montana 10–7. Drive: 10 plays, 69 yards, 5:00.
- MONT – Kevin Macias 22-yard field goal, 2:54. Montana 13–7. Drive: 11 plays, 42 yards, 6:05.

Top passers

- MONT – Camron Humphrey – 12/23, 105 yards
- UW – Dylan Morris – 27/46, 226 yards, 3 int

Top rushers

- MONT – Xavier Harris – 15 rushes, 70 yards
- UW – Richard Newton – 17 rushes, 62 yards

Top receivers

- MONT – Mitch Roberts – 2 receptions, 29 yards
- UW – Cade Otton – 8 receptions, 82 yards

Entering the season ranked 20th in the nation, UW struggled immensely in their opener against FCS opponent Montana en route to a shocking 13–7 defeat at the hands of the Grizzlies. Despite entering as 23.5-point favorites over the Griz, the Huskies' offense was shut out for the final 55 minutes of the game, as starting quarterback Dylan Morris tossed 3 picks and zero touchdowns. The Huskies only had 291 yards of total offense. The upset marked only the second time in 20 meetings all-time between the schools that Montana had ever beaten Washington and was also Montana's first win in the series in over 100 years, dating back to 1920. In addition to being the first time that UW has lost to an FCS opponent, it was also only the fifth instance of an FCS team beating an Top-25 FBS team.

=== At Michigan ===
Washington Huskies at Michigan Wolverines – Game summary

Quarter	1	2	3	4	Total
Huskies	0	0	3	7	10
Wolverines	3	7	7	14	31

at Michigan Stadium • Ann Arbor, MI

- Date: September 11, 2021
- Game time: 5:00 p.m. PDT
- Game weather: 74 °F (23 °C) Clear
- Game attendance: 108,345
- Referee: Mike Cannon
- TV announcers (ABC): Sean McDonough (play by play), Todd Blackledge (color), Todd McShay, Molly McGrath (sideline)

Game information

First quarter

- MICH – Jake Moody 52-yard field goal, 7:18. Michigan 3–0. Drive: 5 plays, 20 yards, 1:25.

Second quarter

- MICH – Blake Corum 67-yard run (Jake Moody kick), 9:47. Michigan 10–0. Drive: 5 plays, 79 yards, 2:29.

Third quarter

- MICH – Blake Corum 7-yard run (Jake Moody kick), 10:52. Michigan 17–0. Drive: 8 plays, 73 yards, 4:08.
- UW – Peyton Henry 28-yard field goal, 5:54. Michigan 17–3. Drive: 15 plays, 72 yards, 4:58.

Fourth quarter

- MICH – Hassan Haskins 6-yard run (Jake Moody kick), 13:56. Michigan 24–3. Drive: 14 plays, 75 yards, 6:58.
- UW – Terrell Bynum 22-yard pass from Dylan Morris (Peyton Henry kick), 12:04. Michigan 24–10. Drive: 5 plays, 75 yards, 1:52.
- MICH – Blake Corum 4-yard run (Jake Moody kick), 1:48. Michigan 31–10. Drive: 10 plays, 56 yards, 5:13.

Top passers

- UW – Dylan Morris – 20/37, 293 yards, TD
- MICH – Cade McNamara – 7/15, 44 yards

Top rushers

- UW – Richard Newton – 12 rushes, 24 yards
- MICH – Blake Corum – 21 rushes, 171 yards, 3 TD

Top receivers

- UW – Terrell Bynum – 5 receptions, 115 yards, TD
- MICH – Cornelius Johnson – 1 reception, 33 yards

=== vs Arkansas State ===
Arkansas State Red Wolves vs Washington Huskies – Game summary

Quarter	1	2	3	4	Total
Red Wolves	0	0	3	0	3
Huskies	14	14	7	17	52

at Husky Stadium • Seattle, WA

- Date: September 18, 2021
- Game time: 1:15 p.m. PDT
- Game weather: 64 °F (18 °C) • Weather: Cloudy • Wind: N 5 MPH
- Game attendance: 58,772
- Referee: Christopher Wiggins
- TV announcers (P12N): J. B. Long (play-by-play) and Max Browne (analyst)

Game information

First quarter

- UW – Cade Otton 13-yard pass from Dylan Morris (Tim Horn kick), 8:21. Washington 7–0. Drive: 10 plays, 88 yards, 4:13.
- UW – Sean McGrew 13-yard run (Peyton Henry kick), 3:32. Washington 14–0. Drive: 7 plays, 80 yards, 2:38.

Second quarter

- UW – Richard Newton 2-yard run (Tim Horn kick), 13:40. Washington 21–0. Drive: 10 plays, 70 yards, 3:38.
- UW – Jalen McMillan 33-yard pass from Dylan Morris (Peyton Henry kick), 10:00. Washington 28–0. Drive: 7 plays, 93 yards, 2:30.

Third quarter

- UW – Sean McGrew 2-yard run (Peyton Henry kick), 4:37. Washington 35–0. Drive: 7 plays, 45 yards, 3:06.
- ARST – Blake Grupe 26-yard field goal, 2:55. Washington 35–3. Drive: 5 plays, 20 yards, 0:43.

Fourth quarter

- UW – Terrell Bynum 42-yard pass from Dylan Morris (Peyton Henry kick), 13:59. Washington 42–3. Drive: 2 plays, 54 yards, 0:45.
- UW – Peyton Henry 38-yard field goal, 8:05. Washington 45–3. Drive: 10 plays, 72 yards, 4:35.
- UW – Bralen Trice 72-yard fumble returned (Peyton Henry kick), 3:34. Washington 52–3. Drive: 14 plays, 47 yards, 4:31.

Top passers

- ARST – James Blackman – 16-38, 176 yards
- UW – Dylan Morris – 23-39, 367 yards, 3 TD, 2 INT

Top rushers

- ARST – Johnnie Lang Jr. – 6 carries, 18 yards
- UW – Richard Newton – 10 carries, 52 yards, 1 TD

Top receiving

- ARST – Lincoln Pare – 7 receptions, 69 yards
- UW – Jalen McMillan – 10 receptions, 175 yards, 1 TD

=== vs California ===
California Golden Bears vs Washington Huskies – Game summary

Quarter	1	2	3	4	OT	Total
Golden Bears	7	3	7	7	0	24
Huskies	7	14	3	0	7	31

at Husky Stadium • Seattle, WA

- Date: September 25, 2021
- Game time: 6:30 p.m. PDT
- Game weather: Temperature: 74 °F (23 °C) • Weather: Sunny • Wind: N 4 mph
- Game attendance: 60,104
- Referee: Mike McCabe
- TV announcers (P12N): Guy Haberman (play by play), Shane Vereen (analyst)

Game information

Top passers

- CAL – Chase Garbers – 30-41, 319 yards, 2 TD, 2 INT
- UW – Dylan Morris – 19-32, 234 yards, 2 TD

Top rushers

- CAL – Chase Garbers – 16 carries, 71 yards, 1 TD
- UW – Sean McGraw – 16 carries, 53 yards, 2 TD

Top receiving

- CAL – Kekoa Crawford – 8 receptions, 107 yards
- UW – Devin Culp – 5 receptions, 81 yards

=== At Oregon State ===
Washington Huskies at Oregon State Beavers – Game summary

Quarter	1	2	3	4	Total
Huskies	7	3	0	14	24
Beavers	0	14	3	10	27

at Reser Stadium • Corvallis, OR

- Date: October 2, 2021
- Game time: 6:00 p.m. PDT
- Game weather: 70 °F (21 °C) Sunny
- Game attendance: 33,733
- Referee: Mark Duddy
- TV announcers (Pac-12 Network): Roxy Bernstein (play-by-play), Lincoln Kennedy (analyst)

Game information

First quarter

- WAS – Terrell Bynum 44 Yd pass from Morris the Atrocious (Peyton Henry Kick), 12:02. Washington 7–0. Drive: 6 plays, 75 yards, 2:58.

Second quarter

- OSU – Jack Colletto 3 Yd Run (Everett Hayes Kick), 13:37. Tied 7–7. Drive: 3 plays, 11 yards, 1:18.
- OSU – B. J. Baylor 5 Yd Run (Everett Hayes Kick), 8:25. Oregon State 14–7. Drive: 7 plays, 42 yards, 3:34.
- WAS – Peyton Henry 20 Yd Field Goal, 0:00. Oregon State 14–10. Drive: 12 plays, 68 yards, 3:10.

Third quarter

- OSU – Everett Hayes 29 Yd Field Goal, 5:28. Oregon State 17–10. Drive: 9 plays, 28 yards, 4:53.

Fourth quarter

- WAS – Sean McGrew 39 Yd Run (Peyton Henry Kick), 10:19. Tied 17–17. Drive: 7 plays, 74 yards, 3:52.
- WAS – Sean McGrew 6 Yd Run (Peyton Henry Kick)), 10:02. Washington 24–17. Drive: 1 play, 6 yards, 0:05.
- OSU – B. J. Baylor 27 Yd Run (Everett Hayes Kick), 6:35. Tied 24–24. Drive: 6 plays, 75 yards, 3:27.
- OSU – Everett Hayes 24 Yd Field Goal, 0:00. Oregon State 27–24. Drive: 9 plays, 40 yards, 3:18.

Top passers

- WAS – Dylan Morris – 17/26, 142 yards, TD, INT
- OSU – Chance Nolan – 7/15, 48 yards, INT

Top rushers

- WAS – Sean McGrew – 16 rushes, 104 yards, 2 TD
- OSU – B. J. Baylor – 20 rushes, 111 yards, 2 TD

Top receivers

- WAS – Terrell Bynum – 5 receptions, 61 yards, TD
- OSU – Anthony Gould – 1 reception, 22 yards

=== vs UCLA ===
UCLA Bruins vs Washington Huskies – Game summary

Quarter	1	2	3	4	Total
Bruins	7	10	0	7	24
Huskies	3	7	7	0	17

at Husky Stadium • Seattle, WA

- Date: October 16, 2021
- Game time: 5:30 p.m. PDT
- Game weather: 63 °F (17 °C) Partly Cloudy
- Game attendance: 62,266
- Referee: Francisco Villar
- TV announcers (FOX): Tim Brando (play by play), Spencer Tillman (analyst)

Game information

First quarter

- UW – Peyton Henry 25-yard field goal, 3:23. UW 3–0. Drive: 12 plays, 74 yards, 5:31.
- UCLA – Kam Brown 17-yard pass from Dorian Thompson-Robinson (Nicholas Barr-Mira kick), 0:29. UCLA 7–3. Drive: 6 plays, 75 yards, 2:54.

Second quarter

- UCLA – Nicholas Barr-Mira 39-yard field goal, 7:04. UCLA 10–3. Drive: 8 plays, 51 yards, 4:19.
- UCLA – Dorian Thompson-Robinson 1-yard run (Nicholas Barr-Mira kick), 3:33. UCLA 17–3. Drive: 6 plays, 56 yards, 2:19.
- UW – Rome Odunze 26-yard pass from Dylan Morris (Peyton Henry kick), 0:52. UCLA 17–10. Drive: 8 plays, 69 yards, 2:35.

Third quarter

- UW – Dylan Morris 1-yard run (Peyton Henry kick), 6:55. Tied 17–17. Drive: 9 plays, 75 yards, 4:52.

Fourth quarter

- UCLA – Greg Dulcich 9-yard pass from Dorian Thompson-Robinson (Nicholas Barr-Mira kick), 8:19. UCLA 24–17. Drive: 13 plays, 90 yards, 5:47.

Top passers

- UCLA – Dorian Thompson-Robinson – 21/26, 183 yards, 2 TD
- UW – Dylan Morris – 20/30, 184 yards, TD, 2 INT

Top rushers

- UCLA – Zach Charbonnet – 21 rushes, 131 yards
- UW – Kamari Pleasant – 9 rushes, 80 yards

Top receivers

- UCLA – Chase Cota – 3 receptions, 60 yards
- UW – Rome Odunze – 4 receptions, 58 yards, TD

=== At Arizona ===
Washington Huskies at Arizona Wildcats – Game summary

Quarter	1	2	3	4	Total
Huskies	0	0	7	14	21
Wildcats	3	10	3	0	16

at Arizona Stadium • Tucson, AZ

- Date: October 22, 2021
- Game time: 7:30 p.m. PDT
- Game attendance: 30,880
- Referee: Steven Strimling
- TV announcers (ESPN2): Clay Matvick, Rocky Boiman, Tiffany Blackmon

Game information

Top passers

- UW – Dylan Morris – 13/21, 217 yards, 2 TD
- ARIZ – Will Plummer – 13/20, 62 yards, 2 TD

Top rushers

- UW – Sean McGrew – 17 carries, 43 yards
- ARIZ – Stevie Rocker Jr. – 8 carries, 87 yards

Top receiving

- UW – Terrell Bynum – 5 receptions, 143 yards, TD
- ARIZ – Stanley Berryhill – 6 receptions, 20 yards

=== At Stanford ===
Washington Huskies at Stanford Cardinal – Game summary

Quarter	1	2	3	4	Total
Huskies	0	9	3	8	20
Cardinal	3	0	0	10	13

at Stanford Stadium • Stanford, CA

- Date: October 30, 2021
- Game time: 7:30 p.m. PDT
- Game weather: Cloudy, 58 °F (14 °C)
- Game attendance: 28,014
- Referee: Mark Duddy
- TV announcers (FS1): -

Game information

First quarter

- STAN – Joshua Karty 35-yard field goal, 7:56. Stanford 3–0. Drive: 13 plays, 58 yards, 7:04.

Second quarter

- UW – Peyton Henry 24-yard field goal, 14:07. Tied 3–3. Drive: 12 plays, 57 yards, 5:39.
- UW – Peyton Henry 37-yard field goal, 6:39. Washington 6–3. Drive: 8 plays, 50 yards, 4:37.
- UW – Peyton Henry 32-yard field goal, 0:00. Washington 9–3. Drive: 13 plays, 81 yards, 3:00.

Third quarter

- UW – Peyton Henry 35-yard field goal, 5:17. Washington 12–3. Drive: 6 plays, 18 yards, 2:37.

Fourth quarter

- STAN – Tanner McKee 1-yard run (Joshua Karty kick), 12:52. Washington 12–10. Drive: 16 plays, 75 yards, 7:25.
- STAN – Joshua Karty 43-yard field goal, 7:05. Stanford 13–12. Drive: 7 plays, 29 yards, 3:25.
- UW – Jalen McMillan 20-yard pass from Dylan Morris (Giles Jackson run), 0:21. Washington 20–13. Drive: 8 plays, 67 yards, 2:30.

Top passers

- UW – Dylan Morris – 17/25, 146 yards, TD
- STAN – Tanner McKee – 21/32, 194 yards, 2 int

Top rushers

- UW – Sean McGrew – 19 rushes, 114 yards
- STAN – Austin Jones – 16 rushes, 62 yards

Top receivers

- UW – Jalen McMillan – 6 receptions, 84 yards, TD
- STAN – Benjamin Yurosek – 6 receptions, 93 yards

=== vs No. 4 Oregon ===
Oregon Ducks vs Washington Huskies – Game summary

Quarter	1	2	3	4	Total
No. 4 Ducks	3	7	7	9	26
Huskies	9	0	0	7	16

at Husky Stadium • Seattle, WA

- Date: November 6, 2021
- Game time: 4:30 p.m. PDT
- Game weather: 46 °F (8 °C); Rain
- Game attendance: 63,193
- Referee: Michael Mothershed
- TV announcers (ABC): Mark Jones, Robert Griffin III, Quint Kessenich

Game information

Top passers

- ORE – Anthony Brown – 10-20, 98 yards, 1 TD, 1 INT
- WASH – Dylan Morris – 15-27, 111 yards, 1 INT

Top rushers

- ORE – Travis Dye – 28 carries, 211 yards, 1 TD
- WASH – Sean McGrew – 15 carries, 48 yards, 2 TD

Top receiving

- ORE – Devon Williams – 2 receptions, 32 yards, 1 TD
- WASH – Cade Otton – 4 receptions, 30 yards

=== Arizona State ===
Arizona State Sun Devils vs Washington Huskies – Game summary

Quarter	1	2	3	4	Total
Sun Devils	0	7	7	21	35
Huskies	14	3	7	6	30

at Husky Stadium • Seattle, WA

- Date: November 13, 2021
- Game time: 4:00 p.m. PST
- Game weather: 49 °F (9 °C) Rain, Cloudy
- Game attendance: 57,858
- Referee: Francisco Villar
- TV announcers (FS1): Dan Hellie (play by play), Petros Papadakis (analyst)

Game information

First quarter

- UW – Cameron Davis 3-yard run (Peyton Henry kick), 10:49. UW 7–0. Drive: 8 plays, 60 yards, 4:04.
- UW – Dylan Morris 3-yard run (Peyton Henry kick), 5:06. UW 14–0. Drive: 8 plays, 67 yards, 3:43.

Second quarter

- ASU – Curtis Hodges 18-yard pass from Jayden Daniels (Cristian Zendejas kick), 0:46. UW 14–7. Drive: 7 plays, 70 yards, 1:52.
- UW – Peyton Henry 37-yard field goal, 0:00. UW 17–7. Drive: 5 plays, 27 yards, 0:37.

Third quarter

- ASU – Rachaad White 5-yard run (Cristian Zendejas kick), 7:39. UW 17–14. Drive: 2 plays, 9 yards, 0:32.
- UW – Kamari Pleasant 1-yard run (Peyton Henry kick), 0:00. UW 24–14. Drive: 9 plays, 46 yards, 5:16.

Fourth quarter

- ASU – Jayden Daniels 4-yard run (Cristian Zendejas kick), 5:46. UW 24–21. Drive: 20 plays, 81 yards, 9:09.
- ASU – Rachaad White 10-yard run (Cristian Zendejas kick), 1:11. ASU 28–24. Drive: 8 plays, 56 yards, 2:55.
- ASU – Merlin Robinson 37-yard interception return (Cristian Zendejas kick), 0:32. ASU 35–24. Drive: 4 plays, 9 yards, 0:39.
- UW – Devin Culp 2-yard pass from Dylan Morris (Two-point pass conversion failed), 0:03. ASU 35–30. Drive: 3 plays, 63 yards, 0:23.

Top passers

- ASU – Jayden Daniels – 10/16, 90 yards, TD, INT
- UW – Dylan Morris – 16/28, 151 yards, TD, INT

Top rushers

- ASU – Rachaad White – 32 carries, 184 yards, 2 TD
- UW – Cameron Davis – 18 carries, 67 yards, TD

Top receiving

- ASU – Rachaad White – 5 receptions, 53 yards
- UW – Rome Odunze – 8 receptions, 82 yards

=== At Colorado ===
Washington Huskies at Colorado Buffaloes – Game summary

Quarter	1	2	3	4	Total
Huskies	0	10	0	7	17
Buffaloes	10	0	0	10	20

at Folsom Field • Boulder, CO

- Date: November 20, 2021
- Game time: 12:00 p.m. PST
- Game attendance: 41,284
- Referee: Chris Coyte
- TV announcers (P12N): Roxy Bernstein, Lincoln Kennedy

Game information

Top passers

- UW – Dylan Morris – 33/52, 387 yards, 2 TD, 2 INT
- COL – Brendon Lewis – 14/25, 112 yards

Top rushers

- UW – Cameron Davis – 12 carries, 29 yards
- COL – Jarek Broussard – 12 carries, 43 yards

Top receiving

- UW – Devin Culp – 6 receptions, 83 yards
- COL – Brady Russell – 3 receptions, 31 yards

=== vs Washington State ===
Washington State Cougars vs Washington Huskies – Game summary

Quarter	1	2	3	4	Total
Cougars	10	3	10	17	40
Huskies	0	7	0	6	13

at Husky Stadium • Seattle, WA

- Date: November 26, 2021
- Game time: 5:10 p.m.
- Game attendance: 68,077
- Referee: Michael Mothershed
- TV announcers (FS1): Alex Faust, Petros Padadakis

Game information

Top passers

- WSU – Jayden de Laura – 27/32, 245 yards
- UW – Sam Huard – 17/31, 190 yards, TD, 4 INT

Top rushers

- WSU – Max Borghi – 22 carries, 129 yards, 2 TD
- UW – Kamari Pleasant – 8 carries, 34 yards, TD

Top receiving

- WSU – Donovan Ollie – 5 receptions, 68 yards
- UW – Rome Odunze – 3 receptions, 69 yards, TD

== Rankings ==
Team	Poll	Pre	Wk 2	Wk 3	Wk 4	Wk 5	Wk 6	Wk 7	Wk 8	Wk 9	Wk 10	Wk 11	Wk 12	Wk 13	Wk 14	Final
Washington	AP	20	NR	NR	NR	NR	NR	NR								
Washington	C	21	NR	NR	NR	NR	NR	NR	NR							
Washington	CFP	Not released														

Legend
	Improvement in ranking
	Drop in ranking
	Not ranked previous week
	No change in ranking from previous week
RV	Received votes but were not ranked in Top 25 of poll

== Coaching staff ==
Name	Position	Alma mater
Jimmy Lake	Head coach (fired mid season)	Eastern Washington (1999)
Junior Adams	Wide receivers coach (became offensive coordinator mid season)	Montana State (2004)
Keith Bhonapha	Running backs coach /special teams coordinator	Hawai'i (2003)
Terrence Brown	Assistant defensive backs coach	Stanford (2013)
Derham Cato	Tight ends coach	Dartmouth (2010)
John Donovan	Offensive coordinator/quarterbacks coach (fired mid season)	Johns Hopkins (1996)
Bob Gregory	Defensive coordinator/inside linebackers coach	Washington State (1987)
Will Harris	Defensive backs coach	USC (2009)
Scott Huff	Offensive line coach	Boise State (2002)
Ikaika Malloe	Co-defensive coordinator/outside linebackers coach	Washington (1997)
Rip Rowan	Defensive line coach	Austin Peay State (2014)
Tim Socha	Head strength and conditioning coach	Minnesota (1999)
Aaron Knotts	Chief of staff	Miami (OH) (1999)
