= Tim Tibesar =

American football coach (born 1972)

Current position
- Title: Defensive coordinator & linebackers coach
- Team: Akron
- Conference: MAC

Biographical details
- Born: August 27, 1972 (age 54); Saint Paul, Minnesota, U.S.

Playing career
- 1993–1996: North Dakota
- Position: Linebacker

Coaching career (HC unless noted)
- 1997: San Diego State (SA)
- 1998: Grossmont (LB)
- 1999: California (GA)
- 2000: Cornell (TE)
- 2001–2003: North Dakota (LB)
- 2004–2005: North Dakota (DC/LB)
- 2006: Kansas State (ST)
- 2007–2008: Kansas State (DC/DB)
- 2009–2010: Montreal Alouettes (LB)
- 2011: Montreal Alouettes (DC/LB)
- 2012: Purdue (DC/LB)
- 2013: Chicago Bears (LB)
- 2014: Northwestern (def. consultant)
- 2015–2016: Wisconsin (OLB)
- 2017: Wisconsin (RGC/OLB)
- 2018–2021: Oregon State (DC/OLB)
- 2022–present: Akron (DC/LB)

Accomplishments and honors

Awards
- 2× Grey Cup champion (2009, 2010)

Tim Tibesar (born August 27, 1972) is an American gridiron football coach. He is the defensive coordinator and linebackers coach for the University of Akron, positions he has held since 2022. Formerly was the defensive coordinator and outside linebackers coach at Oregon State University.

== Coaching career ==
Tibesar began his coaching career at San Diego State in 1997 as a student assistant and was later an assistant coach at Grossmont College in 1998, where he coached linebackers. After a stint as a graduate assistant at California and as the tight ends coach at Cornell, Tibesar returned to his alma mater North Dakota as linebackers coach, eventually being promoted to defensive coordinator in 2004. He left North Dakota to be the special teams coordinator at Kansas State in 2006. Tibesar was promoted to defensive coordinator in 2007 and was not retained when Kansas State head coach Ron Prince was fired and replaced with Bill Snyder. Tibesar's departure was highlighted when he filed a lawsuit against the university for additional compensation after he wasn't retained, leading to the university to discover an alleged secret deal between Prince and then-athletic director Bob Krause.

Tibesar was named the linebackers coach for the Montreal Alouettes of the Canadian Football League (CFL) in 2009, where he won two Grey Cups as an assistant coach. After one season as the Alouettes' defensive coordinator, Tibesar returned to the collegiate ranks as the defensive coordinator at Purdue. Tibesar spent only one season at Purdue before leaving to coach the linebackers for the Chicago Bears under former Alouettes head coach Marc Trestman. He was fired by the Bears after the season, ending his short tenure with the organization. After working as a defensive consultant for Northwestern in 2014, Tibesar was named the outside linebackers coach at Wisconsin in 2015.

Tibesar was named the defensive coordinator and outside linebackers coach at Oregon State in December 2017. He was terminated by Oregon State on November 7, 2021, the day after a 37–34 loss to Colorado.

In 2022, Tibesar joined Joe Moorhead's staff at Akron as the defensive coordinator.
