= 2021 Colorado Buffaloes football team =

American college football season

2021 Colorado Buffaloes football
- Conference: Pac-12 Conference
- South Division
- Record: 4–8 (3–6 Pac-12)
- Head coach: Karl Dorrell (2nd season)
- Offensive coordinator: Darrin Chiaverini (2nd season)
- Offensive scheme: Pro-style
- Defensive coordinator: Chris Wilson (1st season)
- Base defense: 4–3
- Home stadium: Folsom Field

Uniform
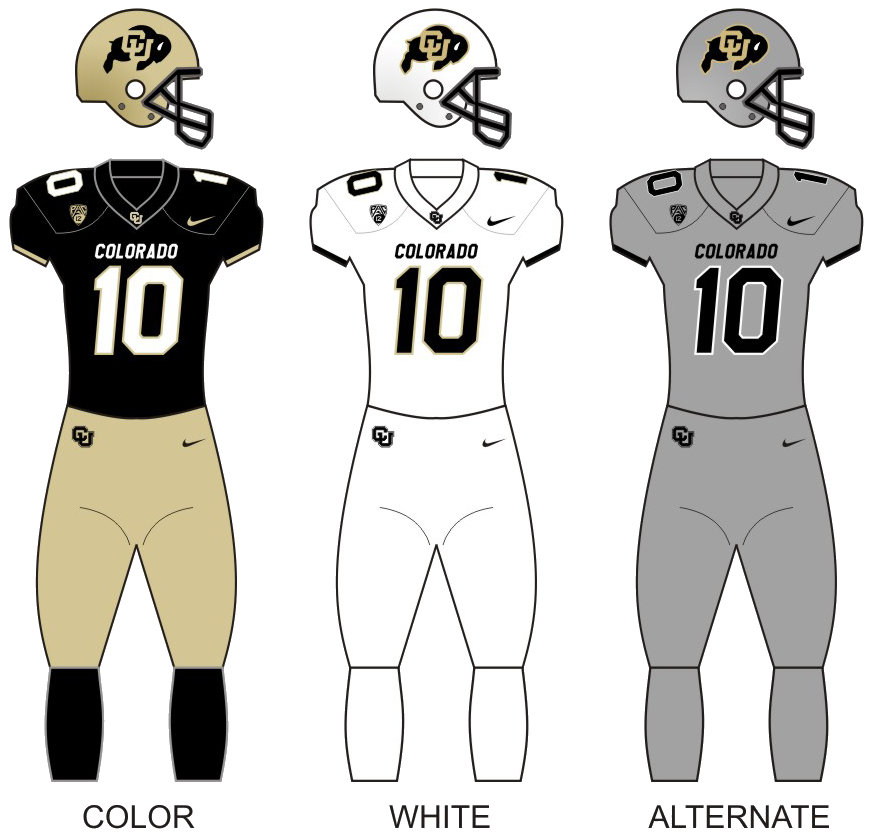

2021 Pac-12 Conference football standings
	Conf.			Overall
Team	W		L	W		L
North Division
No. 22 Oregon xy	7	–	2	10	–	4
Washington State	6	–	3	7	–	6
Oregon State	5	–	4	7	–	6
California	4	–	5	5	–	7
Washington	3	–	6	4	–	8
Stanford	2	–	7	3	–	9
South Division
No. 12 Utah xy$	8	–	1	10	–	4
UCLA	6	–	3	8	–	4
Arizona State†	0	–	3	0	–	5
USC	3	–	6	4	–	8
Colorado	3	–	6	4	–	8
Arizona	1	–	8	1	–	11
Championship: Utah 38, Oregon 10
$ – Conference champion; x – Division champion/co-champions; y – Championship game participant; Rankings from AP Poll

The 2021 Colorado Buffaloes football team represented the University of Colorado Boulder during the 2021 NCAA Division I FBS football season. The Buffaloes were led by second-year head coach Karl Dorrell. They played their home games on campus at Folsom Field as a member of the South Division of the Pac-12 Conference.

== Schedule ==
Date	Time	Opponent	Site	TV	Result	Attendance
September 3	7:00 p.m.	Northern Colorado*	Folsom Field; Boulder, CO	P12N	W 35–7	44,153
September 11	1:30 p.m.	vs. No. 5 Texas A&M*	Empower Field at Mile High; Denver, CO	FOX	L 7–10	61,203
September 18	11:00 a.m.	Minnesota*	Folsom Field; Boulder, CO	P12N	L 0–30	47,482
September 25	8:30 p.m.	at Arizona State	Sun Devil Stadium; Tempe, AZ	ESPNU	L 13–35	44,803
October 2	12:00 p.m.	USC	Folsom Field; Boulder, CO	P12N	L 14–37	48,197
October 16	1:30 p.m.	Arizona	Folsom Field; Boulder, CO	P12N	W 34–0	49,806
October 23	1:30 p.m.	at California	California Memorial Stadium; Berkeley, CA	P12N	L 3–26	36,264
October 30	1:30 p.m.	at No. 7 Oregon	Autzen Stadium; Eugene, OR	FOX	L 29–52	51,449
November 6	5:00 p.m.	Oregon State^{†}	Folsom Field; Boulder, CO	P12N	W 37–34 ^{2OT}	47,984
November 13	7:00 p.m.	at UCLA	Rose Bowl; Pasadena, CA	P12N	L 20–44	36,573
November 20	1:00 p.m.	Washington	Folsom Field; Boulder, CO	P12N	W 20–17	41,284
November 26	2:00 p.m.	at No. 19 Utah	Rice–Eccles Stadium; Salt Lake City, UT (Rumble in the Rockies)	FOX	L 13–28	51,538
*Non-conference game; ^{†}Homecoming; Rankings from AP Poll (and CFP Rankings, after November 2) - Released prior to game; All times are in Mountain time

== Coaching staff ==
Name	Title
Karl Dorrell	Head coach
Chris Wilson	Defensive coordinator/ defensive line coach
Darrin Chiaverini	Offensive coordinator/wide receivers coach
Danny Langsdorf	Pass game coordinator/ quarterbacks coach
Brett Maxie	Safeties coach/defensive passing game coordinator
Bryan Cook	Tight ends coach
Darian Hagan	Running backs coach
Demetrice Martin	Cornerbacks coach
Brian Michalowski	Outside linebackers coach
Mitch Rodrigue (fired mid season)	Offensive line coach
Mark Smith	Inside linebackers coach

- William Vlachos took over as the offensive line coach when Rodrigue was fired
