= Tavion Thomas =

American football player (born 2000)

Profile
- Position: Running back

Personal information
- Born: May 22, 2000 (age 26); Dayton, Ohio
- Listed height: 6 ft 0 in (1.83 m)
- Listed weight: 237 lb (108 kg)

Career information
- High school: Dunbar (Dayton, Ohio)
- College: Cincinnati (2018–2019); Independence CC (2020); Utah (2021–2022)
- NFL draft: 2023: undrafted

Awards and highlights
- First-team All-Pac-12 (2021)
- Stats at Pro Football Reference

Tavion Thomas (born May 22, 2000) is an American football running back who played for the Utah Utes.

== Early life ==
Thomas attended Dunbar High School in Dayton, Ohio. As a senior he rushed for 1,663 yards with 24 touchdowns. He committed to the University of Cincinnati to play college football.

== College career ==
Thomas played 2018 and 2019 at Cincinnati. In his two years, he rushed for 689 yards on 129 carries with seven touchdowns. In 2020 he transferred to Independence Community College. He rushed for 347 yards with five touchdowns in his lone season at Independence. In 2021, Thomas transferred to the University of Utah. He started four of 13 games his first year at Utah, leading the team with 1,108 yards on 204 carries with a school record 21 touchdowns. Thomas returned to Utah for 2022 rather than enter the 2022 NFL draft. He played in only 10 games, including 2 in a limited role, and totaled 730 all-purpose yards and 7 touchdowns.

== Personal life ==
While preparing for the 2023 NFL Draft, Thomas was arrested and charged with three felonies related to alleged domestic violence against his girlfriend. Thomas is also facing domestic abuse charges in a separate incident involving a different woman.

== Professional career ==
Pre-draft measurables
Height	Weight	Arm length	Hand span	40-yard dash	10-yard split	20-yard split	20-yard shuttle	Vertical jump	Broad jump	Bench press
6 ft 0 3/8 in (1.84 m)	237 lb (108 kg)	31 1/8 in (0.79 m)	9 1/4 in (0.23 m)	4.74 s	1.62 s	2.71 s	4.69 s	31.5 in (0.80 m)	9 ft 10 in (3.00 m)	19 reps

After going undrafted by the NFL, Thomas was listed by a scout as being on the XFL watch list, but was not signed in 2023.
