= B. J. Baylor =

American football player (born 1998)

B.J. Baylor
Profile
- Position: Running back

Personal information
- Born: September 8, 1998 (age 28); Wharton, Texas, U.S.
- Listed height: 5 ft 11 in (1.80 m)
- Listed weight: 205 lb (93 kg)

Career information
- High school: Wharton
- College: Oregon State (2017–2021)
- NFL draft: 2022: undrafted

Career history
- Green Bay Packers (2022)*; Atlanta Falcons (2022–2023)*; BC Lions (2023)*
- * Offseason or practice squad member only

Awards and highlights
- First-team All-Pac-12 (2021)
- Stats at Pro Football Reference

B. J. Baylor (born September 8, 1998) is an American professional football running back. He played college football for the Oregon State Beavers. He also spent time on the Green Bay Packers, Atlanta Falcons and BC Lions practice squads.

== Professional career ==
Pre-draft measurables
Height	Weight	Arm length	Hand span	40-yard dash	10-yard split	20-yard split	20-yard shuttle	Three-cone drill	Vertical jump	Broad jump	Bench press
5 ft 10 in (1.78 m)	202 lb (92 kg)	30 3/8 in (0.77 m)	9 in (0.23 m)	4.55 s	1.63 s	2.58 s	4.34 s	7.03 s	35.5 in (0.90 m)	10 ft 4 in (3.15 m)	12 reps
All values from Pro Day

=== Green Bay Packers ===
After going undrafted in the 2022 NFL draft, Baylor signed with the Green Bay Packers as an undrafted free agent. He was waived during the first round of training camp cuts on August 16, 2022.

=== Atlanta Falcons ===
On September 15, 2022, the Atlanta Falcons signed Baylor to the practice squad. He signed a reserve/future contract on January 9, 2023. He was waived/injured on May 15, 2023, and placed on injured reserve.

=== BC Lions ===
On September 12, 2023, the BC Lions signed Baylor to their practice roster. He was released on September 25, 2023.
