= Dylan Morris =

American football coach & player

Current position
- Title: Assistant running backs coach
- Team: Alabama Crimson Tide
- Conference: SEC

Biographical details
- Born: Puyallup, Washington, U.S.

Playing career
- 2019–2023: Washington
- 2024: James Madison
- Position: Quarterback

Coaching career (HC unless noted)
- 2025–present: Alabama (assistant RB)

Dylan Morris is an American college football coach and former player who is currently the assistant running backs coach for the Alabama Crimson Tide. He played college football as a quarterback for the Washington Huskies and James Madison Dukes.

== Early life ==
Morris attended Graham-Kapowsin High School in Graham, Washington, where he threw for 9,815 yards and 99 touchdowns and compiled a 40-7 record. He was ranked as a four-star recruit and committed to play college football with the Washington Huskies.

== College career ==
=== Washington ===
As a freshman in 2019, Morris took a redshirt season. He made his first career start in the 2020 season opener, where he completed 14 of 24 passes for 141 yards and ran for 21 yards and a touchdown in a 27–21 win over Oregon State. In his second start, Morris went 15 for 25 passing for 230 yards and two touchdowns in a win over Arizona. Morris finished the 2020 season completing 67 of 110 pass attempts for 897 yards and four touchdowns with three interceptions, while also adding 57 yards and two touchdowns on the ground. He was named an honorable mention all-Pac-12. In 2021, Morris threw for 2,458 yards and 14 touchdowns against a conference-leading 12 interceptions. Ahead of the 2022 season, he lost the starting quarterback job to Indiana transfer Michael Penix. Morris finished the 2022 season completing nine of 16 passes for 142 yards and a touchdown with an interception. In 2023, he completed nine of 14 passes for 224 yards and a touchdown with an interception. After the season, Morris entered the NCAA transfer portal, but would stay with team during their playoff run.

Morris finished his career at Washington throwing for 3,721 yards, 20 touchdowns, and 17 interceptions while compiling a 5–8 record as a starter.

=== James Madison ===
Morris announced that he decided to transfer to play for the James Madison Dukes with his final season of eligibility.

=== College statistics ===
Year	Team	Games			Passing								Rushing			
Year	Team	GP	GS	Record	Cmp	Att	Pct	Yds	Avg	TD	Int	Rate	Att	Yds	Avg	TD
2019	Washington	Redshirt														
2020	Washington	4	4	1−1	67	110	60.9	897	8.2	4	3	136.0	17	57	3.4	2
2021	Washington	12	11	4−7	220	363	60.6	2,458	6.8	14	12	123.6	46	-25	-0.5	3
2022	Washington	7	0	0−0	9	16	56.3	142	8.9	1	1	138.9	5	29	5.8	0
2023	Washington	4	0	0−0	9	14	64.3	224	16.0	1	1	208.0	1	-5	-5.0	0
2024	James Madison	4	0	4−0	1	1	100.0	6	6.0	0	0	150.4	0	0	0.0	0
Career		30	15	9−8	306	504	60.7	3,727	7.4	20	17	129.2	69	56	0.8	5

== Coaching career ==
On June 29, 2025, Morris was hired by the University of Alabama as the assistant running backs coach.
