= Chryst (surname) =

Chryst is a surname. Notable people with the surname include:

- Geep Chryst (born 1962), American football player and coach
- George Chryst (1937–1992), American football player and coach
- Keller Chryst, American football player
- Paul Chryst (born 1965), American football player and coach
- Rick Chryst, American sports commissioner
