= 2021 Las Vegas Bowl =

Postseason college football bowl game

2021 SRS Distribution Las Vegas Bowl
- 29th Las Vegas Bowl
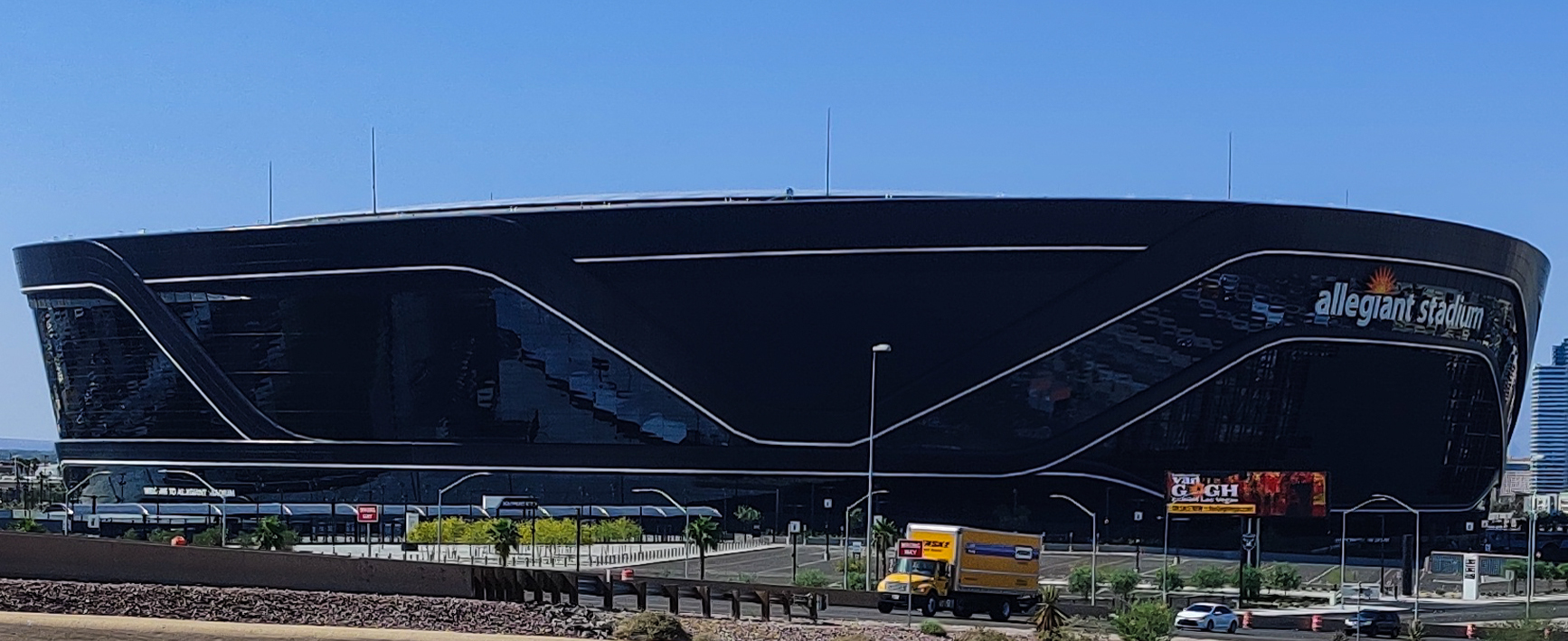
- Allegiant Stadium in Paradise, Nevada, hosted the Las Vegas Bowl for the first time ever.
| Wisconsin Badgers | Arizona State Sun Devils |
| (8–4) | (8–4) |
| Big Ten | Pac-12 |
| 20 | 13 |
| Head coach: Paul Chryst | Head coach: Herm Edwards |
| | 1 | 2 | 3 | 4 | Total |
|---|---|---|---|---|---|
| Wisconsin | 14 | 6 | 0 | 0 | 20 |
| Arizona State | 3 | 3 | 7 | 0 | 13 |
- Date: December 30, 2021
- Season: 2021
- Stadium: Allegiant Stadium
- Location: Paradise, Nevada
- MVP: Braelon Allen (RB, Wisconsin)
- Favorite: Wisconsin by 8
- Referee: David Smith (SEC)
- Attendance: 32,515
- Payout: US$2,900,000

United States TV coverage
- Network: ESPN
- Announcers: Beth Mowins (play-by-play), Kirk Morrison (analyst), and Dawn Davenport (sideline)

The 2021 Las Vegas Bowl was a college football bowl game played on December 30, 2021, with kickoff at 10:30 p.m. EST (7:30 p.m. local PST) on ESPN. It was the 29th edition of the Las Vegas Bowl and was one of the 2021–22 bowl games concluding the 2021 FBS football season. Sponsored by roofing distribution company SRS Distribution, the game was officially known as the SRS Distribution Las Vegas Bowl.

== Teams ==
The bowl featured Wisconsin of the Big Ten Conference (Big Ten) and Arizona State of the Pac-12 Conference. This was the fifth meeting between the two programs, with Arizona State holding a 3–1 edge in previous meetings, the most recent occurring in 2013. This was Wisconsin's first trip to the Las Vegas Bowl. This was Arizona State's third trip to the Las Vegas Bowl. They lost their two previous trips (2011 to Boise State, and 2018 to Fresno State).

=== Wisconsin Badgers ===
Wisconsin, 8-4 (6–3 in conference play), have won six out of their last seven bowl game appearances. All-American linebacker Leo Chenal and freshman All-American tailback Braelon Allen are top players for the Badgers.

=== Arizona State Sun Devils ===
Arizona State entered the bowl with an 8–4 record overall, and a 6–3 record in Pac-12 play. The Sun Devils finished in second place in the conference's South Division, tied with UCLA.

== Game summary ==
2021 SRS Distribution Las Vegas Bowl

| Quarter | 1 | 2 | 3 | 4 | Total |
|---|---|---|---|---|---|
| Wisconsin | 14 | 6 | 0 | 0 | 20 |
| Arizona State | 3 | 3 | 7 | 0 | 13 |

at Allegiant Stadium • Paradise, Nevada

- Date: Thursday, December 30, 2021
- Game time: 10:30 p.m. EST (7:30 p.m. local PST)
- Game weather: None (indoor stadium)
- Game attendance: 32,515
- Referee: David Smith
- TV announcers (ESPN): Beth Mowins (play-by-play), Kirk Morrison (analyst), and Dawn Davenport (sideline)
- Box score

Game information

First quarter

- 11:40 WISC – John Chenal 8-yard rush, Collin Larsh kick good. Drive: 4 plays, 36 yards, 1:34. Wisconsin 7–0
- 4:21 ASU – Cristian Zendejas 38-yard field goal. Drive: 14 plays, 55 yards, 7:19. Wisconsin 7–3
- 1:37 WISC – Jake Ferguson 7-yard pass from Graham Mertz, Collin Larsh kick good. Drive: 6 plays, 75 yards, 2:44. Wisconsin 14–3

Second quarter

- 11:13 ASU – Cristian Zendejas 36-yard field goal. Drive: 7 plays, 17 yards, 2:46. Wisconsin 14–6
- 5:42 WISC – Collin Larsh 48-yard field goal. Drive: 10 plays, 45 yards, 5:31. Wisconsin 17–6
- 0:02 WISC – Collin Larsh 35-yard field goal. Drive: 10 plays, 55 yards, 4:43. Wisconsin 20–6

Third quarter

- 8:52 ASU – Daniyel Ngata 3-yard rush, Cristian Zendejas kick good. Drive: 5 plays, 64 yards, 3:02. Wisconsin 20–13

Fourth quarter
No scoring plays

=== Statistics ===
| Statistics | Wisconsin | Arizona State |
|---|---|---|
| First downs | 17 | 14 |
| Plays–yards | 58–294 | 54–219 |
| Rushes–yards | 43–157 | 33–60 |
| Passing yards | 137 | 159 |
| Passing: comp–att–int | 11–15–1 | 11–21–1 |
| Time of possession | 32:10 | 27:50 |

| Team | Category | Player | Statistics |
|---|---|---|---|
| Wisconsin | Passing | Graham Mertz | 11/15, 137 yards, TD, INT |
| Wisconsin | Rushing | Braelon Allen | 29 carries, 159 yards |
| Wisconsin | Receiving | Jake Ferguson | 3 receptions, 33 yards, TD |
| Arizona State | Passing | Jayden Daniels | 11/21, 159 yards, INT |
| Arizona State | Rushing | Jayden Daniels | 19 carries, 40 yards |
| Arizona State | Receiving | Ricky Pearsall | 4 receptions, 65 yards |
