= 2021 Arizona State Sun Devils football team =

American college football season

2021 Arizona State Sun Devils football

Las Vegas Bowl (vacated), L 13–20 vs. Wisconsin
- Conference: Pac-12 Conference
- South Division
- Record: 0–5, 8 wins vacated (0–3 Pac-12, 6 wins vacated)
- Head coach: Herm Edwards (4th season)
- Offensive coordinator: Zak Hill (2nd season)
- Offensive scheme: Spread
- Defensive coordinator: Antonio Pierce (2nd season)
- Base defense: 4–3
- Home stadium: Sun Devil Stadium

Uniform
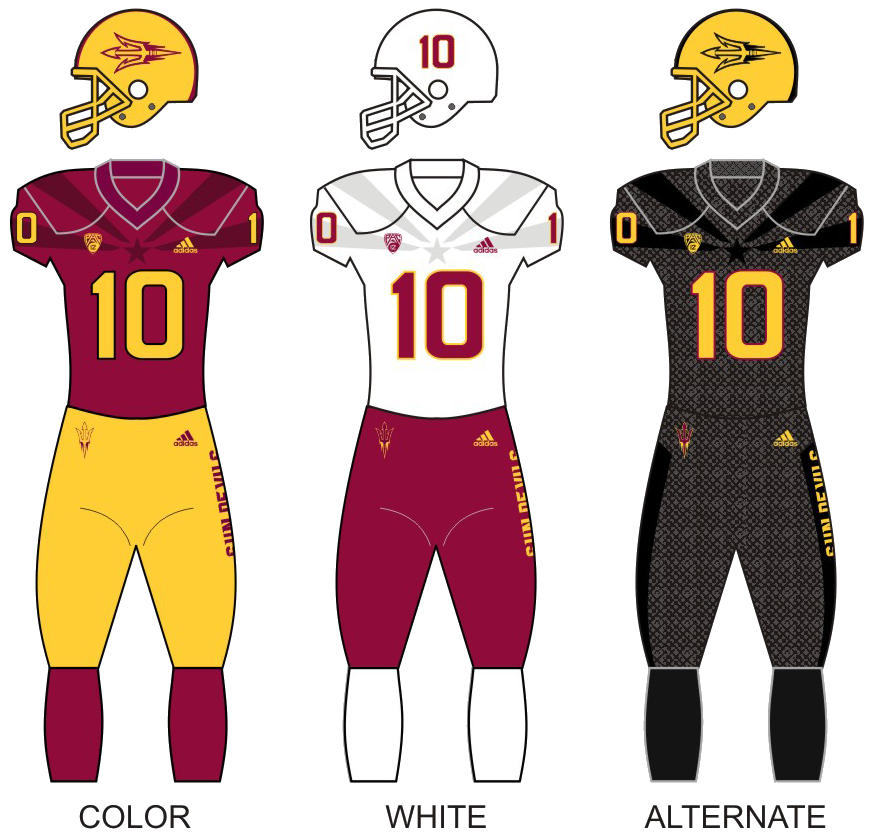

2021 Pac-12 Conference football standings
	Conf.			Overall
Team	W		L	W		L
North Division
No. 22 Oregon xy	7	–	2	10	–	4
Washington State	6	–	3	7	–	6
Oregon State	5	–	4	7	–	6
California	4	–	5	5	–	7
Washington	3	–	6	4	–	8
Stanford	2	–	7	3	–	9
South Division
No. 12 Utah xy$	8	–	1	10	–	4
UCLA	6	–	3	8	–	4
Arizona State†	0	–	3	0	–	5
USC	3	–	6	4	–	8
Colorado	3	–	6	4	–	8
Arizona	1	–	8	1	–	11
Championship: Utah 38, Oregon 10
$ – Conference champion; x – Division champion/co-champions; y – Championship game participant; Rankings from AP Poll

The 2021 Arizona State Sun Devils football team represented Arizona State University in the 2021 NCAA Division I FBS football season. The Sun Devils played their home games at Sun Devil Stadium in Tempe, Arizona, and competed in the South Division of the Pac-12 Conference. They were led by fourth-year head coach Herm Edwards.

On April 19, 2024, Arizona State vacated all 8 of their wins from the 2021 season due to NCAA violations stemming from Arizona State offering recruiting inducements, impermissible tryouts and tampering. Arizona State ended the season with an 0–5 record.

== Offseason ==
=== 2021 NFL draft ===
==== ASU players drafted into the NFL ====
Round	Pick	Player	Position	NFL team
#6	187	Frank Darby	WR	Atlanta Falcons

==== Undrafted NFL free agents ====
Player	Position	NFL team
Mitchell Fraboni	LS	Houston Texans
Aashari Crosswell	S	Seattle Seahawks

=== Recruiting class ===
The Sun Devils signed a total of 17 student–athletes on National Signing Day.

==== Recruits ====
College recruiting information
Name	Hometown	School	Height	Weight	Commit date
Isaiah Johnson; CB	Playa Del Rey, CA	St. Bernard High School	6 ft 2 in (1.88 m)	180 lb (82 kg)	Aug 3, 2020
Isaiah Johnson; CB	Recruit ratings: Rivals: 247Sports: ESPN: (83)				
Tommi Hill; CB	Orlando, FL	Edgewater High School	6 ft 1 in (1.85 m)	185 lb (84 kg)	Jul 15, 2020
Tommi Hill; CB	Recruit ratings: Rivals: 247Sports: ESPN: (83)				
Ezra Dotson-Oyetade; OL	Garland, TX	Lakeview Centennial High School	6 ft 3 in (1.91 m)	285 lb (129 kg)	Aug 24, 2020
Ezra Dotson-Oyetade; OL	Recruit ratings: Rivals: 247Sports: ESPN: (80)				
Lonyatta Alexander; WR	Burien, WA	Kennedy High School	6 ft 3 in (1.91 m)	189 lb (86 kg)	Jul 17, 2020
Lonyatta Alexander; WR	Recruit ratings: Rivals: 247Sports: ESPN: (80)				
Jaydon Williams; OLB	Dallas, TX	South Oak Cliff High School	6 ft 1 in (1.85 m)	195 lb (88 kg)	May 1, 2020
Jaydon Williams; OLB	Recruit ratings: Rivals: 247Sports: ESPN: (79)				
Robert Regan; CB	Orange, CA	Orange Lutheran High School	6 ft 0 in (1.83 m)	186 lb (84 kg)	Jul 20, 2020
Robert Regan; CB	Recruit ratings: Rivals: 247Sports: ESPN: (78)				
Finn Collins; QB	Mission Hills, CA	Bishop Alemany High School	6 ft 3 in (1.91 m)	178 lb (81 kg)	Apr 7, 2020
Finn Collins; QB	Recruit ratings: Rivals: 247Sports: ESPN: (78)				
Eric Gentry; DE	Philadelphia, PA	Neumann Goretti High School	6 ft 6 in (1.98 m)	205 lb (93 kg)	Jul 23, 2020
Eric Gentry; DE	Recruit ratings: Rivals: 247Sports: ESPN: (76)				
Austin Barry; OL	Riverside, CA	John W. North High School	6 ft 6 in (1.98 m)	260 lb (120 kg)	Jan 8, 2021
Austin Barry; OL	Recruit ratings: Rivals: 247Sports: ESPN: (77)				
Isaia Glass; OT	Queen Creek, AZ	Queen Creek High School	6 ft 5 in (1.96 m)	245 lb (111 kg)	Jul 12, 2020
Isaia Glass; OT	Recruit ratings: Rivals: 247Sports: ESPN: (75)				
Gharin Stansbury; DE	Franklin, LA	Franklin Senior High School	6 ft 5 in (1.96 m)	230 lb (100 kg)	Jul 19, 2020
Gharin Stansbury; DE	Recruit ratings: Rivals: 247Sports: ESPN: (77)				
Armon Bethea; OL	Brooklyn, NY	Erasmus Hall High School	6 ft 5 in (1.96 m)	310 lb (140 kg)	Jan 2, 2021
Armon Bethea; OL	Recruit ratings: Rivals: 247Sports: ESPN: (74)				
Edward Czaplicki; K	Charlotte, NC	Providence High School	6 ft 1 in (1.85 m)	185 lb (84 kg)	Jun 26, 2020
Edward Czaplicki; K	Recruit ratings: Rivals: 247Sports: ESPN: (76)				
Overall recruit ranking:
Note: In many cases, Scout, Rivals, 247Sports, On3, and ESPN may conflict in their listings of height and weight.; In these cases, the average was taken. ESPN grades are on a 100-point scale.; Sources:

=== Position key ===
Back	B	Center	C	Cornerback	CB	Defensive back	DB
Defensive end	DE	Defensive lineman	DL	Defensive tackle	DT	End	E
Fullback	FB	Guard	G	Halfback	HB	Kicker	K
Kickoff returner	KR	Offensive tackle	OT	Offensive lineman	OL	Linebacker	LB
Long snapper	LS	Punter	P	Punt returner	PR	Quarterback	QB
Running back	RB	Safety	S	Tight end	TE	Wide receiver	WR

=== Transfers ===
Outgoing

The Sun Devils lost fifteen players via transfer portal for the 2021 season.

Name	No.	Pos.	Height	Weight	Year	Hometown	New school
Demetrious Flowers	#9	RB	5 ft 11 in (1.80 m)	200 pounds (91 kg)	(redshirt) Freshman	Bellflower, CA	TBD
Nolan Matthews	#88	TE	6 ft 3 in (1.91 m)	242 pounds (110 kg)	Sophomore	Frisco, TX	Southern Methodist
Jordan Kerley	#8	WR	6 ft 1 in (1.85 m)	185 pounds (84 kg)	Sophomore	Austin, TX	Southern Methodist
Brandon Pierce	#85	WR	5 ft 11 in (1.80 m)	175 pounds (79 kg)	(redshirt) Senior	Mission Hills, CA	TBD
Keith Davis	#26	WR	6 ft 1 in (1.85 m)	187 pounds (85 kg)	(redshirt) Sophomore	Northridge, CA	TBD
Joshua Hart	#89	WR	5 ft 11 in (1.80 m)	181 pounds (82 kg)	(redshirt) Freshman	Tucson, AZ	Arkansas–Pine Bluff
Tannor Park	#83	WR	6 ft 3 in (1.91 m)	185 pounds (84 kg)	(redshirt) Junior	Elgin, IL	TBD
Elijah Juarez	#30	LB	6 ft 2 in (1.88 m)	240 pounds (110 kg)	Sophomore	Long Beach, CA	TBD
KJ Jarrell	#10	S	6 ft 1 in (1.85 m)	175 pounds (79 kg)	(redshirt) Junior	Scottsdale, AZ	TBD
Kevin Macias	#44	P	5 ft 11 in (1.80 m)	203 pounds (92 kg)	(redshirt) Senior	Mesa, AZ	Montana
Josh Plaster	#46	P	6 ft 0 in (1.83 m)	176 pounds (80 kg)	Sophomore	Flower Mound, TX	TBD
Cristian Zendejas	#45	K	5 ft 8 in (1.73 m)	180 pounds (82 kg)	(redshirt) Junior		N/A

Incoming

The Sun Devils add six players via transfer portal from the 2021 season.

Name	No.	Pos.	Height	Weight	Year	Hometown	Prev. school
Bryan Thompson	–	WR	6 ft 3 in (1.91 m)	190 pounds (86 kg)	Junior	Moreno Valley, CA	Utah
Jalin Conyers	–	TE	6 ft 4 in (1.93 m)	220 pounds (100 kg)	Sophomore	Gruver, TX	Oklahoma
Triston Miller	–	OT	6 ft 6 in (1.98 m)	290 pounds (130 kg)	Junior	Charlotte, NC	North Carolina
Travez Moore	–	DE	6 ft 6 in (1.98 m)	250 pounds (110 kg)	Graduate Transfer	Bastrop, LA	Louisiana State
Xavier Steele	–	LB	5 ft 11 in (1.80 m)	190 pounds (86 kg)	Senior	Hemet, CA	Massachusetts
Chandler Fincher	–	LB	6 ft 0 in (1.83 m)	175 pounds (79 kg)	Sophomore	Newport Beach, CA	Texas Christian

== Preseason ==
=== Pac-12 Media Day ===
The Pac-12 Media Day was held on July 27, 2021 in Hollywood, California. Arizona State head coach Herm Edwards, quarterback Jayden Daniels, and defensive back Chase Lucas were in attendance to field questions from the media.

Media poll (South Division)
Predicted finish	Team	Votes (1st place)
1	USC	223(27)
2	Utah	183(6)
3	Arizona State	170(6)
4	UCLA	135(1)
5	Colorado	88
6	Arizona	41

=== Preseason All-Pac-12 teams ===
First team

Position	Player	Class	Team
First Team Offense
OL	Dohnovan West	So.	Arizona State
First Team Defense
DL	Jermayne Lole	Jr.	Arizona State
DB	Chase Lucas	(redshirt) Sr.	Arizona State
First Team Special teams
P	Michael Turk	(redshirt) Jr.	Arizona State

Second team

Position	Player	Class	Team
Second Team Offense
QB	Jayden Daniels	So.	Arizona State
RB	Rachaad White	Jr.	Arizona State
OL	Kellen Diesch	GT.	Arizona State
Second Team Defense
DL	Tyler Johnson	(redshirt) Jr.	Arizona State
DB	Evan Fields	Sr.	Arizona State
Second Team Special teams
RS	D.J. Taylor	Fr.	Arizona State

== Personnel ==
=== Roster ===
Arizona State roster as of week 1. (as of September 3, 2021)

2021 Arizona State Sun Devils roster
Quarterbacks: 5 Jayden Daniels, Junior (6'3, 185); 7 Ethan Long, Sophomore (6'2, 215); 10 Finn Collins, Freshman (6'3, 180); 12 Nathan Manning, (redshirt) Freshman (6'3, 185); 15 Daylin McLemore, (redshirt) Freshman (6'3, 205); 16 Trenton Bourguet, (redshirt) Sophomore (5'11, 180); Running backs: 1 DeaMonte Trayanum, Sophomore (5'11, 230); 3 Rachaad White, (redshirt) Senior (6'2, 195); 4 Daniyel Ngata, (redshirt) Freshman (5'9, 185); 23 Deonce Elliott, (redshirt) Freshman (5'10, 190); 32 Jackson He, Senior (5'9, 220); 39 George Hart III, Freshman (5'10, 205); 44 Case Hatch, (redshirt) Junior (6'1, 230); Wide receivers: 2 Geordon Porter, (redshirt) Junior (6'2, 190); 6 LV Bunkley-Shelton, (redshirt) Freshman (5'11, 180); 13 Lonyatta Alexander, Freshman (6'2, 185); 14 Johnny Wilson, (redshirt) Freshman (6'7, 220); 17 Chad Johnson Jr., (redshirt) Freshman (6'2, 180); 19 Ricky Pearsall, Junior (6'1, 190); 20 Giovanni Sanders, Junior (5'11, 175); 21 Elijhah Badger, (redshirt) Freshman (6'1, 190); 22 Bryan Thompson, Graduate Student (6'2, 205); 34 Cade Cadam, (redshirt) Freshman (6'0, 175); 35 Mekhi Metcalf, (redshirt) Junior (6'4, 190); 82 Andre Johnson, (redshirt) Freshman (6'3, 190)	Tight ends: 12 Jalin Conyers, (redshirt) Freshman (6'4, 249); 18 Jake Ray, (redshirt) Freshman (6'4, 240); 85 Ryan Morgan, (redshirt) Freshman (6'3, 245); 86 Curtis Hodges, Graduate Student (6'8, 237); 87 John Stivers, Graduate Student (6'3, 255); Offensive lineman: 50 Jarrett Bell, (redshirt) Junior (6'3, 280); 51 Triston Miller, (redshirt) Freshman (6'5, 290); 52 Ezra Dotson—Oyetade, Freshman (6'3, 285); 54 Eddie Medina, (redshirt) Sophomore (6'3, 285); 57 Armon Bethea, Freshman (6'5, 309); 59 Marco Salas, (redshirt) Sophomore (6'4, 291); 60 Kyle Breed, (redshirt) Junior (6'7, 288); 61 Dohnovan West, Junior (6'3, 277); 64 Ben Bray, (redshirt) Freshman (6'5, 270); 65 Kolbe Stuckwisch, (redshirt) Freshman (6'4, 310); 66 Ben Scott, (redshirt) Sophomore (6'5, 291); 70 Henry Hattis, Graduate Student (6'5, 297); 71 Austin Barry, Freshman (6'5, 270); 72 Sione Veikoso, Freshman (6'7, 290); 73 Isaia Glass, Freshman (6'5, 250); 74 Kellen Diesch, Graduate Student (6'6, 300); 76 Spencer Lovell, (redshirt) Junior (6'6, 309); 77 LaDarius Henderson, (redshirt) Sophomore (6'4, 285); 78 Roman DeWys, (redshirt) Freshman (6'5, 299); 79 Ralph Frias, (redshirt) Sophomore (6'6, 320); 94 Corey Stephens, Graduate Student (6'3, 285)	Defensive line: 10 Amiri Johnson, (redshirt) Sophomore (6'6, 225); 14 Stanley Lambert, (redshirt) Junior(6'4, 225); 35 B.J. Green II, Freshman (6'0, 260); 41 Tyler Johnson, Graduate Student (6'4, 265); 44 T.J. Pesefea, (redshirt) Junior (6'2, 259); 49 Travez Moore, Graduate Student (6'4, 250); 55 Omarr Norman-Lott, (redshirt) Freshman (6'3, 296); 58 Joe Moore, (redshirt) Freshman (6'3, 240); 90 Jermayne Lole, Senior (6'2, 284); 95 Matthew Pola Mao, Sophomore (6'2, 315); 96 Anthonie Cooper, (redshirt) Sophomore (6'2, 280); 97 Shannon Forman, Graduate Student (6'2, 293); 98 DJ Davidson, Graduate Student (6'4, 313); 99 Gharin Stansbury, Freshman (6'5, 220); Linebackers: 5 Jaydon Williams, Freshman (6'1, 185); 8 Merlin Robertson, Senior (6'3, 251); 9 Eric Gentry, Freshman (6'6, 220); 18 Connor Soelle, (redshirt) Freshman (6'1, 220); 20 Darien Butler, Senior (5'11, 242); 22 Caleb McCullough, (redshirt) Freshman (6'2, 210); 23 Jordan Banks, (redshirt) Freshman (6'2, 230); 28 Will Shaffer, (redshirt) Freshman (6'0, 230); 30 Xavier Steele, Graduate Student (5'11, 200); 34 Kyle Soelle, Graduate Student (6'3, 225); 51 Dylan DeVito, (redshirt) Freshman (6'1, 220); 52 Jacob Jornadal, (redshirt) Freshman (5'11, 190); 53 Fritzny Niclasse, (redshirt) Sophomore (5'11, 213)	Defensive backs: 0 Jack Jones, Graduate Student (5'11, 170); 1 Jordan Clark, (redshirt) Sophomore (5'10, 170); 2 DeAndre Pierce, Graduate Student (5'11, 185); 3 Isaiah Johnson, Freshman (6'1, 180); 4 Evan Fields, Senior (6'0, 193); 6 Tommi Hill, Freshman (6'0, 190); 7 Timarcus Davis, Graduate Student (6'0, 177); 9 D.J. Taylor, (redshirt) Freshman (5'10, 200); 12 Kejuan Markham, Junior (6'1, 189); 13 Keon Markham, (redshirt) Sophomore (6'1, 203); 15 Cam Philips, (redshirt) Sophomore (6'1, 175); 19 Willie Harts, (redshirt) Sophomore (6'0, 162); 21 R.J. Regan, Freshman (6'0, 170); 24 Chase Lucas, (redshirt) Senior (6'0, 176); 25 Macen Williams, (redshirt) Freshman (5'10, 170); 26 T Lee, (redshirt) Freshman (5'10, 170); 31 Jean Boyd III, (redshirt) Freshman (6'0, 190); 32 Edward Woods, (redshirt) Freshman (6'0, 175); 36 Alijah Gammage, (redshirt) Sophomore (5'11, 179); 37 Connor Lewis, (redshirt) Freshman (6'2, 180); 48 Vincenzo Granatelli, (redshirt) Sophomore (6'4, 184); Kickers: 8 Cristian Zendejas, (redshirt) Junior (5'11, 185); 17 Logan Tyler, Graduate Transfer (5'11, 205); 45 Jace Feely, Freshman (6'1, 190); Punters: 38 Eddie Czaplicki, Freshman (6'1, 194); 39 Adam Babb, Freshman (6'3, 178); Long snappers: 43 John Ferlmann, Freshman (6'3, 225); 49 Gage King, (redshirt) Sophomore (6'3, 225); 93 Erik Dickerson, Graduate Student (6'1, 225)

=== Coaching staff ===
Name	Position	Alma mater	Consecutive season at Arizona State in current position
Herm Edwards	Head coach	San Diego State University	4th
Marvin Lewis	Special assistant to the head coach	Idaho State University	1st
Antonio Pierce	Associate head coach/defensive Coordinator/recruiting coordinator	University of Arizona	4th
Shawn Slocum	Assistant coach/special teams Coordinator	Texas A&M University	4th
Zak Hill	Offensive coordinator/quarterbacks Coach	Central Washington University	2nd
Shaun Aguano	Running backs coach	Linfield University	3rd
Robert Rodriguez	Defensive line coach	University of Texas at El Paso	2nd
Prentice Gill	Co-wide receivers coach and assistant recruiting coordinator	University of Southern California	2nd
Chris Hawkins	Defensive backs coach	University of Southern California	2nd
Adam Breneman	Tight ends coach	University of Massachusetts	1st
Mike Cavanaugh	Offensive line coach	Southern Connecticut State University	1st
Chris Claiborne	Linebackers coach	University of Southern California	1st

Graduate assistants

Name	Position	Alma mater	Consecutive season at Arizona State in current position
Tyson McDaniel	Offensive graduate assistant	Arizona State University	2nd
Bobby Wade	Offensive graduate assistant	University of Arizona	1st
Steven Beard	Defensive graduate assistant	Arizona State University	3rd
Shaun Prater	Defensive graduate assistant	Arizona State University	1st

Analysts

Name	Position	Alma mater	Consecutive season at Arizona State in current position
Trey Anderson	Offensive analyst	Arizona State University	1st
Juston Wood	Offensive analyst	Portland State University	1st
Anthony Garnett	Defensive analyst	Ohio University	3rd
Michael Fletcher	Defensive analyst	University of Oregon	1st
Marcus Lewis	Defensive analyst	Indiana State University	1st

== Schedule ==
Date	Time	Opponent	Rank	Site	TV	Result	Attendance
September 2	7:30 p.m.	Southern Utah*	No. 25	Sun Devil Stadium; Tempe, AZ	P12N	W 41–14 (vacated)	44,456
September 11	7:30 p.m.	UNLV*	No. 23	Sun Devil Stadium; Tempe, AZ	ESPN2	W 37–10 (vacated)	42,918
September 18	7:15 p.m.	at No. 23 BYU*	No. 19	LaVell Edwards Stadium; Provo, UT	ESPN	L 17–27	61,570
September 25	7:30 p.m.	Colorado		Sun Devil Stadium; Tempe, AZ	ESPNU	W 35–13 (vacated)	44,803
October 2	7:30 p.m.	at No. 20 UCLA		Rose Bowl; Pasadena, CA	FS1	W 42–23 (vacated)	40,522
October 8	7:30 p.m.	Stanford	No. 22	Sun Devil Stadium; Tempe, AZ	ESPN	W 28–10 (vacated)	46,192
October 16	7:00 p.m.	at Utah	No. 18	Rice–Eccles Stadium; Salt Lake City, UT	ESPN	L 21–35	51,724
October 30	12:00 p.m.	Washington State^{†}		Sun Devil Stadium; Tempe, AZ	FS1	L 21–34	46,136
November 6	7:30 p.m.	USC		Sun Devil Stadium; Tempe, AZ	ESPN	W 31–16 (vacated)	53,926
November 13	4:00 p.m.	at Washington		Husky Stadium; Seattle, WA	FS1	W 35–30 (vacated)	57,858
November 20	7:30 p.m.	at Oregon State		Reser Stadium; Corvallis, OR	ESPN	L 10–24	29,579
November 27	2:00 p.m.	Arizona		Sun Devil Stadium; Tempe, AZ (rivalry)	P12N	W 38–15 (vacated)	52,305
December 30	8:30 p.m.	vs. Wisconsin*		Allegiant Stadium; Paradise, NV (Las Vegas Bowl)	ESPN	L 13–20	32,515
*Non-conference game; ^{†}Homecoming; Rankings from AP Poll (and CFP Rankings, after November 2) - Released prior to game; All times are in Mountain time

== Game summaries ==
=== Vs. Southern Utah ===
Southern Utah Thunderbirds vs. Arizona State Sun Devils – Game summary

Quarter	1	2	3	4	Total
Thunderbirds	7	0	7	0	14
No. 25 Sun Devils	13	15	6	7	41

at Sun Devil Stadium • Tempe, Arizona

- Date: September 2, 2021
- Game time: 7:30 p.m. MST
- Game weather: 90 °F (32 °C) Clear, Sunny
- Game attendance: 44,456
- Referee: Francisco Villar
- TV announcers (P12N): Ted Robinson (play-by-play) and Yogi Roth (analyst)

Game information
First quarter
- ASU – DeaMonte Trayanum 3-yard run (Logan Tyler kick blocked), 14:36. ASU 6–0. Drive: 1 play, 3 yards, 0:04.
- ASU – Rachaad White 26-yard run (Logan Tyler kick), 8:42. ASU 13–0. Drive: 6 plays, 76 yards, 2:58.
- SUU – Judd Cockett 7-yard run (Carson Reed kick), 4:26. ASU 13–7. Drive: 7 plays, 69 yards, 4:15.

Second quarter

- ASU – Rachaad White 1-yard run (Curtis Hodges pass), 11:09. ASU 21–7. Drive: 4 plays, 34 yards, 1:23.
- ASU – DeaMonte Trayanum 20-yard run (Logan Tyler kick), 5:15. ASU 28–7. Drive: 6 plays, 75 yards, 2:41.

Third quarter

- ASU – Ricky Pearsall 26-yard run (Logan Tyler kick failed), 11:03. ASU 34–7. Drive: 7 plays, 61 yards, 3:48.
- SUU – David Moore III 21-yard run (Carson Reed kick), 1:22. ASU 34–14. Drive: 4 plays, 40 yards, 1:58.

Fourth quarter

- ASU – Daniyel Ngata 9-yard run (Logan Tyler kick), 8:11. ASU 41–14. Drive: 7 plays, 34 yards, 4:05.

Statistics	Southern Utah	Arizona State
First downs	15	22
Plays–yards	57–224	58–427
Rushes–yards	26–78	40–228
Passing yards	146	199
Passing: comp–att–int	19–31–3	14–18–0
Time of possession	30:06	29:54

Team	Category	Player	Statistics
Southern Utah	Passing	Justin Miller	19/30, 146 yards, 3 int
Southern Utah	Rushing	Dayne Christensen	10 carries, 28 yards
Southern Utah	Receiving	Lance Lawson	1 reception, 28 yards
Arizona State	Passing	Jayden Daniels	10/12, 132 yards
Arizona State	Rushing	Rachaad White	7 carries, 58 yards
Arizona State	Receiving	Curtis Hodges	2 receptions, 56 yards

=== Vs. UNLV ===
UNLV Rebels vs. Arizona State Sun Devils – Game summary

Quarter	1	2	3	4	Total
Rebels	3	7	0	0	10
No. 23 Sun Devils	0	14	7	16	37

at Sun Devil Stadium • Tempe, Arizona

- Date: September 11, 2021
- Game time: 7:30 p.m. MST
- Game weather: 102 °F (39 °C) Clear, Sunny
- Game attendance: 42,918
- Referee: Cal McNeill
- TV announcers (ESPN2): Beth Mowins (play-by-play), Kirk Morrison (analyst), and Dawn Davenport (sideline)

Game information
First quarter
- UNLV – Daniel Gutierrez 34-yard field goal, 4:40. UNLV 3–0. Drive: 16 plays, 70 yards, 7:40.

Second quarter

- ASU – Johnny Wilson 3-yard pass from Jayden Daniels (Cristian Zendejas kick), 13:42. ASU 7–3. Drive: 11 plays, 71 yards, 5:53.
- UNLV – Doug Brumfield 4-yard run (Daniel Gutierrez kick), 8:46. UNLV 10–7. Drive: 10 plays, 75 yards, 4:56.
- ASU – Daniyel Ngata 13-yard run (Cristian Zendejas kick), 2:56. ASU 14–10. Drive: 11 plays, 62 yards, 5:39.

Third quarter

- ASU – Rachaad White 9-yard run (Cristian Zendejas kick), 0:45. ASU 21–10. Drive: 6 plays, 37 yards, 3:12.

Fourth quarter

- ASU – Rachaad White 1-yard run (Cristian Zendejas kick failed), 13:10. ASU 27–10. Drive: 6 plays, 34 yards, 1:56.
- ASU – LV Bunkley-Shelton 33-yard pass from Jayden Daniels (Cristian Zendejas kick), 8:45. ASU 34–10. Drive: 6 plays, 88 yards, 2:58.
- ASU – Cristian Zendejas 22-yard field goal, 3:03. ASU 37–10. Drive: 7 plays, 43 yards, 4:17.

Statistics	UNLV	Arizona State
First downs	11	29
Plays–yards	51–155	76–465
Rushes–yards	32–88	47–290
Passing yards	67	175
Passing: comp–att–int	17–19–0	20–29–1
Time of possession	25:17	34:43

Team	Category	Player	Statistics
UNLV	Passing	Doug Brumfield	6/14, 60 yards
UNLV	Rushing	Doug Brumfield	8 rushes, 50 yards, TD
UNLV	Receiving	Kyle Williams	2 receptions, 27 yards
Arizona State	Passing	Jayden Daniels	20/29, 175 yards, 2 TD, int
Arizona State	Rushing	Jayden Daniels	13 rushes, 129 yards
Arizona State	Receiving	LV Bunkley-Shelton	3 receptions, 42 yards, TD

=== At No. 23 BYU ===
Arizona State Sun Devils at BYU Cougars – Game summary

Quarter	1	2	3	4	Total
No. 19 Sun Devils	7	0	10	0	17
No. 23 Cougars	7	14	0	6	27

at LaVell Edwards Stadium • Provo, Utah

- Date: September 18, 2021
- Game time: 7:15 p.m. MST
- Game weather: 67 °F (19 °C), Clear, Sunny
- Game attendance: 61,570
- Referee: Matthew Richards
- TV announcers (ESPN): Dave Flemming (play-by-play), Rod Gilmore (analyst), and Stormy Buonantony (sideline)

Game information
First quarter
- BYU – Tyler Allgeier 4-yard run (Justen Smith kick), 14:23. BYU 7–0. Drive: 3 plays, 12 yards, 0:31.
- ASU – Rachaad White 1-yard run (Cristian Zendejas kick), 11:10. Tied 7–7. Drive: 6 plays, 75 yards, 3:13.

Second quarter

- BYU – Gunner Romney 34-yard pass from Jaren Hall (Justen Smith kick), 8:54. BYU 14–7. Drive: 6 plays, 83 yards, 2:06.
- BYU – Isaac Rex 15-yard pass from Jaren Hall (Justen Smith kick), 4:40. BYU 21–7. Drive: 8 plays, 74 yards, 2:33.

Third quarter

- ASU – Daniyel Ngata 10-yard run (Cristian Zendejas kick), 9:42. BYU 21–14. Drive: 9 plays, 80 yards, 4:23.
- ASU – Cristian Zendejas 40-yard field goal, 3:40. BYU 21–17. Drive: 11 plays, 43 yards, 5:10.

Fourth quarter

- BYU – Isaac Rex 3-yard pass from Baylor Romney (2pt run fail), 1:19. BYU 27–17. Drive: 12 plays, 77 yards, 5:18.

Statistics	Arizona State	BYU
First downs	19	23
Plays–yards	62–426	67–361
Rushes–yards	33–161	39–144
Passing yards	265	217
Passing: comp–att–int	21–29–2	16–28–2
Time of possession	32:23	27:37

Team	Category	Player	Statistics
Arizona State	Passing	Jayden Daniels	21/29, 265 yards, 2 int
Arizona State	Rushing	Daniyel Ngata	8 rushes, 82 yards, TD
Arizona State	Receiving	Rachaad White	9 receptions, 65 yards
BYU	Passing	Jaren Hall	15/27, 214 yards, 2 TD, 2 int
BYU	Rushing	Tyler Allgeier	21 rushes, 69 yards, TD
BYU	Receiving	Gunner Romney	6 receptions, 95 yards, TD

=== Vs. Colorado ===
Colorado Buffaloes vs. Arizona State Sun Devils – Game summary

Quarter	1	2	3	4	Total
Buffaloes	0	3	7	3	13
Sun Devils	7	7	7	14	35

at Sun Devil Stadium • Tempe, Arizona

- Date: September 25, 2021
- Game time: 7:30 p.m. MST
- Game weather: 90 °F (32 °C), Sunny
- Game attendance: 44,803
- Referee: Chris Coyte
- TV announcers (ESPNU): Mike Corey (play-by-play), Tom Ramsey (analyst)

Game information
First quarter
- ASU – Jayden Daniels 7-yard run (Cristian Zendejas kick), 7:45. ASU 7–0. Drive: 6 plays, 45 yards, 3:33.

Second quarter

- ASU – Rachaad White 11-yard run (Cristian Zendejas kick), 9:28. ASU 14–0. Drive: 7 plays, 72 yards, 3:09.
- CU – Cole Becker 51-yard field goal, 0:13. ASU 14–3. Drive: 10 plays, 58 yards, 2:53.

Third quarter

- CU – Alex Fontenot 1-yard run (Cole Becker kick), 11:01. ASU 14–10. Drive: 8 plays, 75 yards, 3:59.
- ASU – Elijhah Badger 17-yard run (Cristian Zendejas kick), 7:53. ASU 21–10. Drive: 6 plays, 71 yards, 3:02.

Fourth quarter

- ASU – Rachaad White 30-yard pass from Ricky Pearsall (Cristian Zendejas kick), 14:16. ASU 28–10. Drive: 5 plays, 62 yards, 2:28.
- ASU – Jayden Daniels 15-yard run (Cristian Zendejas kick), 8:30. ASU 35–10. Drive: 7 plays, 59 yards, 3:53.
- CU – Cole Becker 51-yard field goal, 3:56. ASU 35–13. Drive: 9 plays, 61 yards, 4:27.

Statistics	Colorado	Arizona State
First downs	18	25
Plays–yards	61–250	59–439
Rushes–yards	44–183	32–167
Passing yards	67	272
Passing: comp–att–int	7–17–0	20–27–0
Time of possession	28:55	31:05

Team	Category	Player	Statistics
Colorado	Passing	Brendon Lewis	7/17, 67 yards
Colorado	Rushing	Alex Fontenot	14 rushes, 67 yards, TD
Colorado	Receiving	Ty Robinson	1 reception, 26 yards
Arizona State	Passing	Jayden Daniels	18/25, 236 yards
Arizona State	Rushing	Jayden Daniels	7 rushes, 75 yards, 2 TD
Arizona State	Receiving	LV Bunkley-Shelton	4 reception, 76 yards

=== At No. 20 UCLA ===
Arizona State Sun Devils at No. 20 UCLA Bruins – Game summary

Quarter	1	2	3	4	Total
Sun Devils	3	21	8	10	42
No. 20 Bruins	3	20	0	0	23

at Rose Bowl • Pasadena, CA

- Date: October 2, 2021
- Game time: 8:30 p.m. MST
- Game weather: 80 °F (27 °C) Clear
- Game attendance: 40,522
- Referee: Michael Mothershed
- TV announcers (FS1): Chris Myers (play-by-play), Mark Helfrich (analyst)

Game information
First quarter
- UCLA – Nicholas Barr-Mira 48-yard field goal, 10:40. UCLA 3–0. Drive: 10 plays, 45 yards, 4:20.
- ASU – Cristian Zendejas 25-yard field goal, 4:11. Tied 3–3. Drive: 5 plays, 20 yards, 2:20.

Second quarter

- UCLA – Kyle Philips 3-yard pass from Dorian Thompson-Robinson (Nicholas Barr-Mira kick), 14:57. UCLA 10–3. Drive: 12 plays, 75 yards, 4:14.
- ASU – DeaMonte Trayanum 6-yard run (Cristian Zendejas kick), 11:59. Tied 10–10. Drive: 7 plays, 75 yards, 2:58.
- UCLA – Brittain Brown 1-yard run (Nicholas Barr-Mira kick), 10:03. UCLA 17–10. Drive: 6 plays, 73 yards, 1:48.
- ASU – Ricky Pearsall 65-yard pass from Jayden Daniels (Cristian Zendejas kick), 8:26. Tied 17–17. Drive: 4 plays, 83 yards, 1:32.
- UCLA – Nicholas Barr-Mira 21-yard field goal, 3:51. UCLA 20–17. Drive: 12 plays, 72 yards, 4:35.
- ASU – Ricky Pearsall 54-yard pass from Jayden Daniels (Cristian Zendejas kick), 2:44. ASU 24–20. Drive: 3 plays, 75 yards, 1:07.
- UCLA – Nicholas Barr-Mira 26-yard field goal, 0:00. ASU 24–23. Drive: 1 play, 0 yards, 0:00.

Third quarter

- ASU – Rachaad White 49-yard run (DeaMonte Trayanum run), 13:32. ASU 32–23. Drive: 4 plays, 75 yards, 1:28.

Fourth quarter

- ASU – Rachaad White 1-yard run (Cristian Zendejas kick), 6:43. ASU 39–23. Drive: 11 plays, 96 yards, 6:52.
- ASU – Cristian Zendejas 32-yard field goal, 2:41. ASU 42–23. Drive: 6 plays, 11 yards, 1:54.

Statistics	Arizona State	UCLA
First downs	16	24
Plays–yards	50–458	83–432
Rushes–yards	32–172	51–197
Passing yards	286	235
Passing: comp–att–int	13–18–0	21–32–0
Time of possession	25:18	34:42

Team	Category	Player	Statistics
Arizona State	Passing	Jayden Daniels	13/18, 286 yards, 2 TD
Arizona State	Rushing	Rachaad White	9 rushes, 69 yards, 2 TD
Arizona State	Receiving	Ricky Pearsall	4 receptions, 132 yards, 2 TD
UCLA	Passing	Dorian Thompson-Robinson	21/32, 235 yards, TD
UCLA	Rushing	Dorian Thompson-Robinson	18 rushes, 93 yards
UCLA	Receiving	Greg Dulcich	9 receptions, 136 yards

=== Vs. Stanford ===
Stanford Cardinal vs. Arizona State Sun Devils – Game summary

Quarter	1	2	3	4	Total
Cardinal	7	0	3	0	10
No. 22 Sun Devils	14	7	7	0	28

at Sun Devil Stadium • Tempe, Arizona

- Date: October 8, 2021
- Game time: 7:30 p.m. MST
- Game weather: 86 °F (30 °C), Cloudy, Wind: W 20mph
- Game attendance: 46,192
- Referee: Steven Strimling
- TV announcers (ESPN): Jason Benetti (play-by-play), Andre Ware (analyst) and Paul Carcaterra (sideline)

Game information

First quarter

- ASU – Jayden Daniels 51-yard run (Cristian Zendejas kick), 7:12. Arizona State 7–0. Drive: 9 plays, 87 yards, 4:20.
- STAN – Elijah Higgins 6-yard pass from Tanner McKee (Emmet Kenney kick), 4:09. Tied 7–7. Drive: 7 plays, 75 yards, 3:03.
- ASU – Rachaad White 5-yard run (Cristian Zendejas kick), 1:05. Arizona State 14–7. Drive: 7 plays, 75 yards, 3:04.

Second quarter

- ASU – Elijhah Badger 22-yard run (Cristian Zendejas kick), 10:24. Arizona State 21–7. Drive: 6 plays, 80 yards, 2:14.

Third quarter

- STAN – Ryan Sanborn 32-yard field goal, 7:32. Arizona State 21–10. Drive: 9 plays, 46 yards, 4:26.
- ASU – DeAndre Pierce 27-yard interception return (Cristian Zendejas kick), 2:38. Arizona State 28–10. Drive: 3 plays, 8 yards, 1:18.

Fourth quarter

- No scoring plays.

Statistics	Stanford	Arizona State
First downs	20	21
Plays–yards	65–365	67–430
Rushes–yards	20–9	44–255
Passing yards	356	175
Passing: comp–att–int	27–45–3	14–23–0
Time of possession	28:06	31:54

Team	Category	Player	Statistics
Stanford	Passing	Tanner McKee	27/45, 356 yards, TD, 3 INT
Stanford	Rushing	Nathaniel Peat	7 carries, 32 yards
Stanford	Receiving	Benjamin Yurosek	6 receptions, 118 yards
Arizona State	Passing	Jayden Daniels	14/23, 175 yards
Arizona State	Rushing	Rachaad White	13 carries, 96 yards, TD
Arizona State	Receiving	Curtis Hodges	4 receptions, 76 yards

=== At Utah ===
No. 18 Arizona State Sun Devils at Utah Utes – Game summary

Quarter	1	2	3	4	Total
No. 18 Sun Devils	7	14	0	0	21
Utes	7	0	14	14	35

at Rice-Eccles Stadium • Salt Lake City, UT

- Date: October 16, 2021
- Game time: 7:00 p.m. MST
- Game attendance: 51,724
- Referee: Chris Coyte
- TV announcers (ESPN): Dave Flemming, Rod Gilmore, Stormy Buonantony

Statistics	Arizona State	Utah
First downs	20	29
Plays–yards	385	455
Rushes–yards	148	208
Passing yards	237	247
Passing: comp–att–int	20–31–2	21–33–2
Time of possession	28:23	31:37

Team	Category	Player	Statistics
Arizona State	Passing	Jayden Daniels	20/31, 237 yards, 2 TDs
Arizona State	Rushing	Rachaad White	9 carries, 56 yards
Arizona State	Receiving	Curtis Hodges	4 receptions, 74 yards, 1 TD
Utah	Passing	Cameron Rising	21/33, 247 yards, 2 TDs, 2 INTs
Utah	Rushing	Tavion Thomas	20 carries, 84 yards, 1 TD
Utah	Receiving	Devaughn Vele	3 receptions, 57 yards

=== Vs. Washington State ===
Washington State Cougars vs. Arizona State Sun Devils – Game summary

Quarter	1	2	3	4	Total
Cougars	14	14	0	6	34
Sun Devils	0	7	0	14	21

at Sun Devil Stadium • Tempe, Arizona

- Date: October 30, 2021
- Game time: 12:00 p.m. MST
- Game weather: 81 °F (27 °C), Sunny, Wind: W 4mph
- Game attendance: 46,136
- Referee: Matthew Richards
- TV announcers (FS1): Cory Provus (play by play), Mark Helfrich (analyst)

Game information
First quarter

Second quarter Third quarter Fourth quarter

Statistics	Washington State	Arizona State
First downs	19	21
Plays–yards	69–400	71–406
Rushes–yards	42–166	32–131
Passing yards	234	275
Passing: comp–att–int	17–27–1	26–39–2
Time of possession	33:06	26:54

Team	Category	Player	Statistics
Washington State	Passing	Jayden de Laura	17/27, 234 yards, 2 TD, int
Washington State	Rushing	Deon McIntosh	16 rushes, 68 yards, TD
Washington State	Receiving	Calvin Jackson Jr.	8 receptions, 139 yards, TD
Arizona State	Passing	Jayden Daniels	23/35, 228 yards, TD, 2 int
Arizona State	Rushing	DeaMonte Trayanum	19 rushes, 89 yards, TD
Arizona State	Receiving	Ricky Pearsall	9 receptions, 83 yards

=== Vs. USC ===
USC Trojans vs. Arizona State Sun Devils – Game summary

Quarter	1	2	3	4	Total
Trojans	0	10	6	0	16
Sun Devils	7	7	3	14	31

at Sun Devil Stadium • Tempe, Arizona

- Date: November 6, 2021
- Game time: 7:30 p.m. MST
- Game weather: 77 °F (25 °C) Clear, Sunny
- Game attendance: 53,926
- Referee: Steven Strimling
- TV announcers (ESPN): Dave Flemming (play-by-play), Rod Gilmore (analyst), and Stormy Buonantony (sideline)

Game information
First quarter

Second quarter

Third quarter

Fourth quarter

Statistics	USC	Arizona State
First downs	20	19
Plays–yards	72–312	62–427
Rushes–yards	27–92	42–282
Passing yards	220	145
Passing: comp–att–int	24–45–0	11–20–0
Time of possession	30:38	29:22

Team	Category	Player	Statistics
USC	Passing	Kedon Slovis	16/28 131yds, 1 Int
USC	Rushing	Keaontay Ingram	14run 54yds
USC	Receiving	Tahj Washington	9rec 78yds
Arizona State	Passing	Jayden Daniels	11/20 145yds, 2 Int
Arizona State	Rushing	Rachaad White	28run 202yds, 3 TD
Arizona State	Receiving	Bryan Thompson	4rec 68yds

=== At Washington ===
Arizona State Sun Devils at Washington Huskies – Game summary

Quarter	1	2	3	4	Total
Sun Devils	0	7	7	21	35
Huskies	14	3	7	6	30

at Husky Stadium • Seattle, Washington

- Date: November 13, 2021
- Game time: 5:00 p.m. MST
- Game weather: 48 °F (9 °C) Rain
- Game attendance: 57,858
- Referee: Francisco Villar
- TV announcers (FS1): Dan Hellie (play by play) and Petros Papadakis (analyst)

Game information
First quarter
- UW – Cameron Davis 3-yard run (Peyton Henry kick), 10:49. UW 7–0. Drive: 8 plays, 60 yards, 4:04.
- UW – Dylan Morris 3-yard run (Peyton Henry kick), 5:06. UW 14–0. Drive: 8 plays, 67 yards, 3:43.

Second quarter

- ASU – Curtis Hodges 18-yard pass from Jayden Daniels (Cristian Zendejas kick), 0:46. UW 14–7. Drive: 7 plays, 70 yards, 1:52.
- UW – Peyton Henry 37-yard field goal, 0:00. UW 17–7. Drive: 5 plays, 27 yards, 0:37.

Third quarter

- ASU – Rachaad White 5-yard run (Cristian Zendejas kick), 7:39. UW 17–14. Drive: 2 plays, 9 yards, 0:32.
- UW – Kamari Pleasant 1-yard run (Peyton Henry kick), 0:00. UW 24–14. Drive: 9 plays, 46 yards, 5:16.

Fourth quarter

- ASU – Jayden Daniels 4-yard run (Cristian Zendejas kick), 5:46. UW 24–21. Drive: 20 plays, 81 yards, 9:09.
- ASU – Rachaad White 10-yard run (Cristian Zendejas kick), 1:11. ASU 28–24. Drive: 8 plays, 56 yards, 2:55.
- ASU – Merlin Robinson 37-yard interception return (Cristian Zendejas kick), 0:32. ASU 35–24. Drive: 4 plays, 9 yards, 0:39.
- UW – Devin Culp 2-yard pass from Dylan Morris (Two-point pass conversion failed), 0:03. ASU 35–30. Drive: 3 plays, 63 yards, 0:23.

Statistics	Arizona State	Washington
First downs	23	17
Plays–yards	73–376	63–266
Rushes–yards	57–286	30–95
Passing yards	90	171
Passing: comp–att–int	10–16–1	19–33–1
Time of possession	33:00	26:53

Team	Category	Player	Statistics
Arizona State	Passing	Jayden Daniels	10/16, 90 yards, TD, INT
Arizona State	Rushing	Rachaad White	32 carries, 184 yards, 2 TD
Arizona State	Receiving	Rachaad White	5 receptions, 53 yards
Washington	Passing	Dylan Morris	16/28, 151 yards, TD, INT
Washington	Rushing	Cameron Davis	18 carries, 67 yards, TD
Washington	Receiving	Rome Odunze	8 receptions, 82 yards

=== At Oregon State ===
Arizona State Sun Devils at Oregon State Beavers – Game summary

Quarter	1	2	3	4	Total
Sun Devils	0	0	3	7	10
Beavers	3	14	0	7	24

at Reser Stadium • Corvallis, OR

- Date: November 20, 2021
- Game time: 7:30 p.m. MST
- Game weather: 42 °F (6 °C) Sunny
- Game attendance: 29,579
- Referee: Michael Mothershed
- TV announcers (ESPN): Dave Flemming (play by play), Rod Gilmore (analyst), and Stormy Buonantony (sideline)
- Game Book

Game information
First quarter
- OSU – Everett Hayes 52-yard field goal, 6:45. OSU 3–0. Drive: 6 plays, 23 yards, 3:15.

Second quarter

- OSU – Tre'Shaun Harrison 10-yard pass from Chance Nolan (Everett Hayes kick), 9:09. OSU 10–0. Drive: 14 plays, 80 yards, 7:46.
- OSU – Chance Nolan 1-yard run (Everett Hayes kick), 1:59. OSU 17–0. Drive: 13 plays, 88 yards, 5:48.

Third quarter

- ASU – Cristian Zendejas 26-yard field goal, 6:12. OSU 17–3. Drive: 14 plays, 76 yards, 7:11.

Fourth quarter

- ASU – DeaMonte Trayanum 1-yard run (Cristian Zendejas kick), 13:56. OSU 17–10. Drive: 2 plays, 4 yards, 0:43.
- OSU – Jack Colletto 47-yard run (Everett Hayes kick), 11:24. OSU 24–10. Drive: 5 plays, 75 yards, 2:32.

Statistics	Arizona State	Oregon State
First downs	15	20
Plays–yards	57–266	64–325
Rushes–yards	30–100	46–235
Passing yards	166	90
Passing: comp–att–int	16–27–1	12–18–0
Time of possession	27:06	32:54

Team	Category	Player	Statistics
Arizona State	Passing	Jayden Daniels	16/27, 166 yards, int
Arizona State	Rushing	Jayden Daniels	10 rushes, 46 yards
Arizona State	Receiving	Rachaad White	6 receptions, 86 yards
Oregon State	Passing	Chance Nolan	12/18, 90 yards, TD
Oregon State	Rushing	B. J. Baylor	20 rushes, 150 yards
Oregon State	Receiving	Trevon Bradford	3 receptions, 26 yards

=== Vs. Arizona ===
Arizona Wildcats vs. Arizona State Sun Devils – Game summary

Quarter	1	2	3	4	Total
Wildcats	3	6	6	0	15
Sun Devils	7	7	17	7	38

at Sun Devil Stadium • Tempe, Arizona

- Date: November 27, 2021
- Game time: 1:00 p.m. MST
- Game weather: 73 °F (23 °C); Sunny
- Game attendance: 52,305
- Referee: Steven Strimling
- TV announcers (P12N): Ted Robinson (play by play), Yogi Roth (analyst)

Statistics	Arizona	Arizona State
First downs	22	16
Plays–yards	73-396	51-314
Rushes–yards	34-50	37-228
Passing yards	346	86
Passing: comp–att–int	28-39-1	10-14-0
Time of possession	35:31	24:29

Team	Category	Player	Statistics
Arizona	Passing	Will Plummer	28/38, 346 yds, TD, INT
Arizona	Rushing	Jamarye Joiner	5 car, 28 yds
Arizona	Receiving	Stanley Berryhill	10 rec, 104 yds
Arizona State	Passing	Jayden Daniels	10/14, 86 yds, 2 TD
Arizona State	Rushing	Rachaad White	21 car, 98 yds, TD
Arizona State	Receiving	Ricky Pearsall	5 rec, 52 yds, 2 TD

Scoring summary

Quarter	Time	Drive			Team	Scoring information	Score	
Quarter	Time	Plays	Yards	TOP	Team	Scoring information	Arizona	Arizona State
1	10:37	9	77	4:17	ARIZ	32-yard field goal by Tyler Loop	3	0
1	6:14	9	75	4:23	ASU	Ricky Pearsall 14-yard touchdown reception from Jayden Daniels, Cristian Zendejas kick good	3	7
2	14:55	12	67	6:19	ARIZ	26-yard field goal by Tyler Loop	6	7
2	12:12	1	1	0:03	ASU	Rachaad White 1-yard touchdown run, Cristian Zendejas kick good	14	6
2	2:19	8	81	3:14	ARIZ	32-yard field goal by Tyler Loop	9	14
3	13:07	4	67	1:46	ASU	Jayden Daniels 48-yard touchdown run, Cristian Zendejas kick good	9	21
3	9:35	9	54	3:27	ARIZ	Michael Wiley 5-yard touchdown reception from Will Plummer, 2-point pass failed	15	21
3	4:50	10	78	4:38	ASU	Ricky Pearsall 14-yard touchdown reception from Jayden Daniels, 2-point pass good	15	29
3	1:44	6	-3	3:06	ASU	Team Safety	15	31
4	9:49	10	70	4:58	ASU	Interception returned 87 yards for touchdown by Jack Jones, Cristian Zendejas kick good	15	38
"TOP" = time of possession. For other American football terms, see Glossary of American football.							15	38

=== Vs. Wisconsin (Las Vegas Bowl) ===
Wisconsin Badgers vs. Arizona State Sun Devils – Game summary

Quarter	1	2	3	4	Total
Badgers	14	6	0	0	20
Sun Devils	3	3	7	0	13

at Allegiant Stadium • Paradise, Nevada

- Date: December 30, 2021
- Game time: 8:30 p.m. MST
- Game weather: None (indoor stadium)
- Game attendance: 32,515
- Referee: David Smith
- TV announcers (ESPN): Beth Mowins (play-by-play), Kirk Morrison (analyst), and Dawn Davenport (sideline)

Game information

First quarter

- 11:40 WISC – John Chenal 8-yard rush, Collin Larsh kick good. Drive: 4 plays, 36 yards, 1:34. Wisconsin 7–0
- 4:21 ASU – Cristian Zendejas 38-yard field goal. Drive: 14 plays, 55 yards, 7:19. Wisconsin 7–3
- 1:37 WISC – Jake Ferguson 7-yard pass from Graham Mertz, Collin Larsh kick good. Drive: 6 plays, 75 yards, 2:44. Wisconsin 14–3

Second quarter

- 11:13 ASU – Cristian Zendejas 36-yard field goal. Drive: 7 plays, 17 yards, 2:46. Wisconsin 14–6
- 5:42 WISC – Collin Larsh 48-yard field goal. Drive: 10 plays, 45 yards, 5:31. Wisconsin 17–6
- 0:02 WISC – Collin Larsh 35-yard field goal. Drive: 10 plays, 55 yards, 4:43. Wisconsin 20–6

Third quarter

- 8:52 ASU – Daniyel Ngata 3-yard rush, Cristian Zendejas kick good. Drive: 5 plays, 64 yards, 3:02. Wisconsin 20–13

Fourth quarter
No scoring plays

Statistics	Wisconsin	Arizona State
First downs	17	14
Plays–yards	58–294	54–219
Rushes–yards	43–157	33–60
Passing yards	137	159
Passing: comp–att–int	11–15–1	11–21–1
Time of possession	32:10	27:50

Team	Category	Player	Statistics
Wisconsin	Passing	Graham Mertz	11/15, 137 yards, TD, int
Wisconsin	Rushing	Braelon Allen	29 rushes, 159 yards
Wisconsin	Receiving	Jake Ferguson	3 receptions, 33 yards, TD
Arizona State	Passing	Jayden Daniels	11/21, 159 yards, int
Arizona State	Rushing	Jayden Daniels	19 rushes, 40 yards
Arizona State	Receiving	Ricky Pearsall	4 receptions, 65 yards

== Rankings ==
Ranking movements Legend: ██ Increase in ranking ██ Decrease in ranking — = Not ranked RV = Received votes
	Week															
Poll	Pre	1	2	3	4	5	6	7	8	9	10	11	12	13	14	Final
AP	25	25	23	19	RV	RV	22	18	RV	—	—	—	—	—	—	
Coaches	RV	RV	25	21	RV	RV	25	22	RV	RV	RV	RV	—	—	—	
CFP	Not released										—	—	—	—	—	Not released
