= Paul Chryst =

American football player and coach (born 1965)

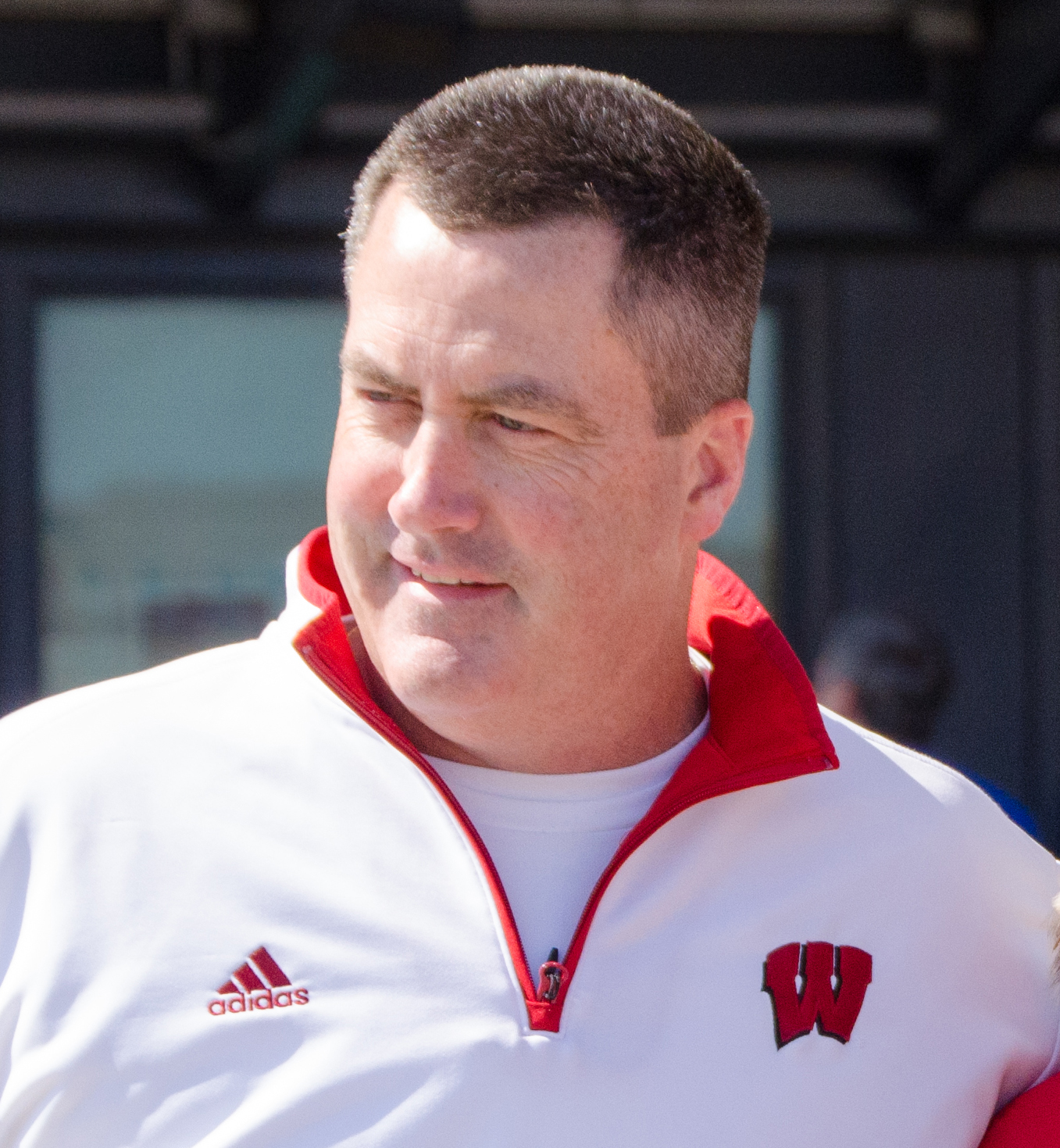
- Chryst in 2015

Biographical details
- Born: November 17, 1965 (age 60); Madison, Wisconsin U.S.

Playing career
- 1986–1988: Wisconsin
- Position: Quarterback

Coaching career (HC unless noted)
- 1989–1990: West Virginia (GA)
- 1991: San Antonio Riders (WR/TE)
- 1992: San Antonio Riders (RB/TE)
- 1993 (spring): Edmonton Eskimos (WR)
- 1993: Wisconsin–Platteville (OC/QB/WR)
- 1994 (spring): Ottawa Rough Riders (ST)
- 1994: Ottawa Rough Riders (QB/RB/WR)
- 1995: Illinois State (OC/QB)
- 1996: Saskatchewan Roughriders (OC/QB)
- 1997–1998: Oregon State (OC/QB)
- 1999–2001: San Diego Chargers (TE)
- 2002: Wisconsin (TE)
- 2003–2004: Oregon State (OC/QB)
- 2005: Wisconsin (co-OC/TE)
- 2006–2011: Wisconsin (OC/QB)
- 2012–2014: Pittsburgh
- 2015–2022: Wisconsin
- 2023: Texas (OA/special asst. to HC)

Head coaching record
- Overall: 86–45
- Bowls: 7–2

Accomplishments and honors

Championships
- 3 Big Ten West Division (2016, 2017, 2019)

Awards
- 2× Big Ten Coach of the Year (2016, 2017)

Paul Joseph Chryst (born November 17, 1965) is an American football coach. He served as the head football coach at the University of Pittsburgh from 2012 to 2014 and the University of Wisconsin—Madison from 2015 to 2022. Chryst had previously been the offensive coordinator at Wisconsin from 2005 through 2011. He also served in the same capacity at Oregon State University and was an assistant coach for the San Diego Chargers of the National Football League (NFL). Chryst played college football at Wisconsin, where he lettered as a quarterback and tight end from 1986 to 1988.

== Early life ==
The son of a high school football coach, Chryst was born and raised in Madison, Wisconsin. The family moved to Platteville, Wisconsin, when his father, George Chryst, became the head football coach at the University of Wisconsin–Platteville in 1979.

Chryst attended Platteville High School, where he was a three-time letterman in football and basketball, and also lettered in baseball and track. As the starting quarterback, he led the 1982 and 1983 Hillmen to consecutive Southern Eight Conference titles and the Wisconsin Division 4 state championship in 1983.

Chryst graduated from the University of Wisconsin in 1988 with a degree in political science, and was a two-time football letter winner at the quarterback and tight end position for the Badgers. He added a master's degree in educational administration from West Virginia University in 1990.

== Coaching career ==
Paul Chryst started his career as a graduate assistant at West Virginia (1989–90), and was then an assistant coach for the World League's San Antonio Riders (1991–92), Wisconsin–Platteville (1993), CFL's Ottawa Rough Riders (1994), Illinois State (1995), CFL's Saskatchewan Roughriders (1996), and Oregon State (1997–98).

He was the tight ends coach for the NFL's San Diego Chargers from 1999 to 2001, where he was instrumental in the development of Freddie Jones into one of the NFL's top tight ends, as well as coaching Steve Heiden, who eventually started with the Cleveland Browns.

Chryst returned to college football in 2002 as Wisconsin's tight ends coach. He then became the offensive coordinator and quarterbacks coach at Oregon State in 2003. The Beavers ranked 10th nationally in total offense (463.0 ypg) and 6th nationally in passing yardage per game (328.1) in 2003. The 2003 Beavers became the first team in NCAA Division I history with a 4,000-yard passer, 1,500-yard rusher and two 1,000-yard receivers. Among the Oregon State stars he coached were RB Ken Simonton, the school's career rushing leader, QB Derek Anderson, who left as the Pac-10's No. 2 career passing leader, and RB Steven Jackson, a 2004 first-round draft choice for the St. Louis Rams.

Chryst came back to Wisconsin in 2005 as co-offensive coordinator and tight ends coach. Under his direction, the Wisconsin offense showed immediate and drastic improvement. The 2005 team set school records for both scoring average (34.3 ppg) and for points scored in a season (446). UW scored at least 40 points six times in 2005. After ending the 2005 season with a 10–3 record, Chryst became the sole offensive coordinator and quarterbacks coach. The 2006 offense was again potent under Chryst, and helped the team to a strong 12–1 finish. Chryst's strong offenses helped guide Wisconsin to back-to-back Rose Bowl appearances in 2010 and 2011. Chryst was a 2011 finalist for the Broyles Award, given annually to the nation's top college football assistant coach.

=== University of Pittsburgh ===
Chryst was hired as the head football coach at Pittsburgh on December 22, 2011. Chryst went 19–19 across three seasons at Pittsburgh and won one bowl game, the 2013 Little Caesars Pizza Bowl.

=== University of Wisconsin ===
On December 17, 2014, Chryst was introduced as the head coach at Wisconsin following the departure of Gary Andersen.

In Chryst's first season, the Badgers went 10–3 and finished 1st nationally in scoring defense (13.7 points per game) and 2nd in total defense (268.5 yards per game). All three losses came to teams that were in the AP top 25 at the end of the season, eventual national champions #1 Alabama, #9 Iowa and #23 Northwestern. Chryst also won the Holiday Bowl against USC, whom the Badgers had a 0–6 record against before the game, with their last meeting being in 1965 at the Los Angeles Memorial Coliseum.

In the opening game of the 2016 season, the unranked Badgers upset #5 LSU at Lambeau Field. Following the opening week of college football when the new AP Poll was released the Badgers were ranked #10, the highest the Badgers had been ranked since the 2011 season where Chryst was the offensive coordinator for the Russell Wilson-led Wisconsin team. On November 29, 2016, Chryst was selected by coaches as the Hayes-Schembechler Coach of the Year in the Big Ten Conference.

Despite the Badgers going 12–1 in 2017, Wisconsin was held out of the College Football Playoff. However, Chryst was again named the Hayes–Schembechler Big Ten Coach of the Year and Wisconsin beat Miami in the 2017 Orange Bowl.

In 2018, the Badgers finished 5–4 in Big Ten play, tying for second place in the West Division. Overall they were 8–5 with a win over Miami in the 2018 Pinstripe Bowl.

The 2019 Badgers went 10–4, winning the Big Ten West division but ending their season with losses to Ohio State in the Big Ten Football Championship Game and Oregon in the Rose Bowl.

The 2020 season was delayed and shortened due to the COVID-19 pandemic. The Badgers finished 4–3 with a win over Wake Forest in the Duke's Mayo Bowl.

In 2021, the Badgers started slow with a 1–3 record, before starting a 7-game win streak. They lost their regular season finale against Minnesota and fell out of contention to win the Big Ten West. The Badgers finished the season with a record of 9–4 with a victory over Arizona State in the Las Vegas Bowl.

Chryst was fired on October 2, 2022, after the Badgers started the 2022 season 2–3 (0–2 Big Ten). He finished at Wisconsin with an overall record of 67–26 (.720), and 43–18 (.705) in Big Ten play.

== Personal life ==
Chryst and his wife, Robin, have three children, daughters Katy and JoJo, and son Danny. He is the brother of former Mid-American Conference commissioner Rick Chryst and former San Francisco 49ers offensive coordinator Geep Chryst. His nephews Keller Chryst and Jackson Chryst play football. Keller played quarterback for Tennessee while Jackson is a quarterback at University of Wisconsin Whitewater.

== Head coaching record ==
Year	Team	Overall	Conference	Standing	Bowl/playoffs	Coaches^{#}	AP^{°}
Pittsburgh Panthers (Big East Conference) (2012)
2012	Pittsburgh	6–7	3–4	5th	L BBVA Compass		
Pittsburgh Panthers (Atlantic Coast Conference) (2013–2014)
2013	Pittsburgh	7–6	3–5	6th (Coastal)	W Little Caesars Pizza		
2014	Pittsburgh	6–6	4–4	T–3rd (Coastal)	Armed Forces (Note: Chryst left for Wisconsin after the regular season; Joe Rudolph coached the Panthers to a 34–35 loss to Houston in the Armed Forces Bowl.)		
Pittsburgh:		19–19	10–13				
Wisconsin Badgers (Big Ten Conference) (2015–2022)
2015	Wisconsin	10–3	6–2	T–2nd (West)	W Holiday	21	21
2016	Wisconsin	11–3	7–2	1st (West)	W Cotton^{†}	9	9
2017	Wisconsin	13–1	9–0	1st (West)	W Orange^{†}	6	7
2018	Wisconsin	8–5	5–4	T–2nd (West)	W Pinstripe		
2019	Wisconsin	10–4	7–2	T–1st (West)	L Rose^{†}	13	11
2020	Wisconsin	4–3	3–3	3rd (West)	W Duke's Mayo		
2021	Wisconsin	9–4	6–3	T–2nd (West)	W Las Vegas		
2022	Wisconsin	2–3 (Note: Paul Chryst was the head coach for the first five games of the season. Wisconsin fired Chryst on October 2, 2022.)	0–2				
Wisconsin:		67–26	43–18				
Total:		86–45					
National championship Conference title Conference division title or championship game berth
^{†}Indicates CFP / New Years' Six bowl.; ^{#}Rankings from final Coaches Poll.; ^{°}Rankings from final AP Poll.
