= George Chryst =

American football player and coach (1937–1992)

Biographical details
- Born: October 24, 1938; Madison, Wisconsin, U.S.
- Died: December 3, 1992 (aged 54); Madison, Wisconsin, U.S.

Playing career

Football
- 1956–1958: Wisconsin
- Positions: Guard, center

Coaching career (HC unless noted)

Football
- 1959: Wisconsin (GA)
- 1962–1965: Edgewood HS (WI) (assistant)
- 1966–1971: Edgewood HS (WI)
- 1972–1977: Wisconsin (OL)
- 1979–1992: Wisconsin–Platteville

Basketball
- 1962–1970: Edgewood HS (WI)

Administrative career (AD unless noted)
- 1966–1972: Edgewood HS (WI)
- 1981–1990: Wisconsin–Platteville

Head coaching record
- Overall: 79–60–2 (college football); 43–10 (high school football); 138–47 (high school basketball)

Accomplishments and honors

Championships
- 1 WSUC (1980)

Awards
- Wisconsin Football Coaches Association (WFCA) Hall of Fame (inducted in 1994)

George Hubert Chryst (April 30, 1937 – December 3, 1992) was an American football player and coach. He served as the head football coach at the University of Wisconsin–Platteville from 1979 to 1992, compiling a record of 79–60–2.

Chryst was born on April 30, 1937, in Madison, Wisconsin. He died suddenly on December 3, 1992, at his mother's home in Madison. Chryst was the father of three sons who became involved in football coaching: Geep, Rick, and Paul.

== Head coaching record ==
=== College football ===
Year	Team	Overall	Conference	Standing	Bowl/playoffs
Wisconsin–Platteville Pioneers (Wisconsin State University Conference) (1979–1992)
1979	Wisconsin–Platteville	5–5	3–5	T–6th	
1980	Wisconsin–Platteville	7–3	6–2	T–1st	
1981	Wisconsin–Platteville	6–4	4–4	T–4th	
1982	Wisconsin–Platteville	5–5	3–5	T–6th	
1983	Wisconsin–Platteville	4–6	3–5	6th	
1984	Wisconsin–Platteville	5–6	4–4	T–5th	
1985	Wisconsin–Platteville	5–5	5–3	4th	
1986	Wisconsin–Platteville	6–5	3–5	T–1st	
1987	Wisconsin–Platteville	6–5	4–4	6th	
1988	Wisconsin–Platteville	6–4	4–4	T–5th	
1989	Wisconsin–Platteville	6–2–1	5–2–1	4th	
1990	Wisconsin–Platteville	7–3	5–3	3rd	
1991	Wisconsin–Platteville	6–3–1	4–3–1	4th	
1992	Wisconsin–Platteville	5–4	4–3	T–4th	
Wisconsin–Platteville:		79–60–2	57–52–2		
Total:		79–60–2			
National championship Conference title Conference division title or championship game berth
