= Chad Voytik =

American football player (born 1994)

No. 9, 16
- Position: Quarterback

Personal information
- Born: March 3, 1994 (age 32); Cleveland, Tennessee, U.S.
- Listed height: 6 ft 1 in (1.85 m)
- Listed weight: 215 lb (98 kg)

Career information
- High school: Cleveland (TN)
- College: Arkansas State
- NFL draft: 2017: undrafted

Chad Joseph Voytik (born March 3, 1994) is an American former football quarterback. He began his college football career at the University of Pittsburgh, where he spent four years playing for the Pittsburgh Panthers. He transferred to Arkansas State University after the 2015 season.

== Early life ==
Voytik attended Cleveland High School in Cleveland, Tennessee. During his career, he passed for over 5,000 passing yards and had 6,098 total yards. Voytik was ranked by Rivals.com as a four-star recruit and the fourth best pro-style quarterback in his class. In July 2011, he committed to play college football at the University of Pittsburgh.

== College career ==
Voytik was redshirted as a freshman in 2012. In 2013, he was the backup quarterback to Tom Savage. In the 2013 Little Caesars Pizza Bowl, Voytik replaced Savage at halftime after he suffered a rib injury and helped Pittsburgh win the game by a score of 30–27, passing for 108 yards and rushing for a touchdown. On August 21, 2014, Voytik was named the Panthers starter for the 2014 season.

Following his fourth year at Pittsburgh, Voytik received his degree, and decided to transfer to another school for his senior season of eligibility. In April 2016, Voytik announced that he was transferring to Eastern Kentucky University. A few weeks later, Voytik revealed he had changed his mind and would be transferring to Arkansas State University.
