= Tyler Boyd (American football) =

American football player (born 1994)

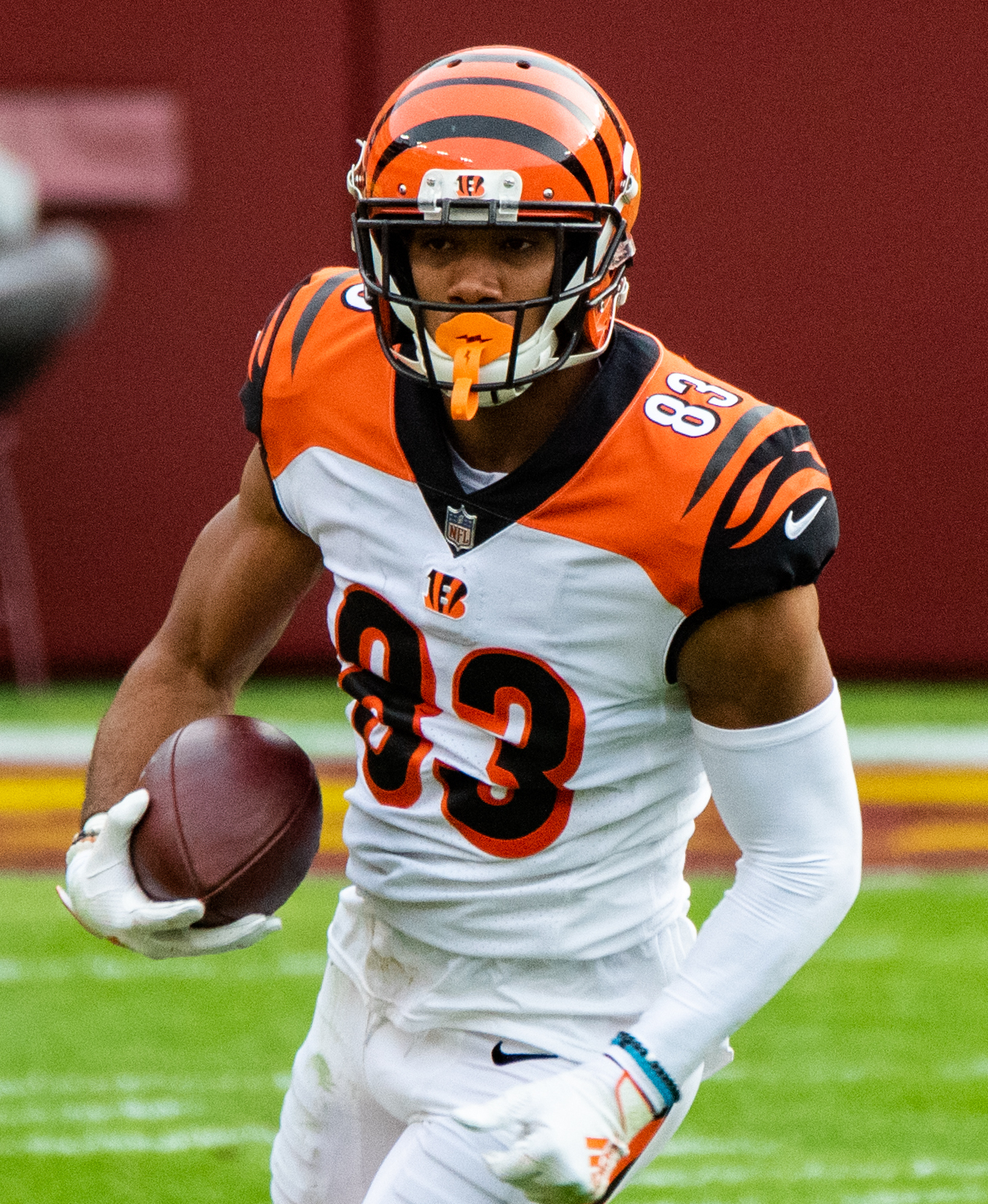
- Boyd with the Cincinnati Bengals in 2020

Profile
- Position: Wide receiver

Personal information
- Born: November 15, 1994 (age 31); Clairton, Pennsylvania, U.S.
- Listed height: 6 ft 2 in (1.88 m)
- Listed weight: 203 lb (92 kg)

Career information
- High school: Clairton
- College: Pittsburgh (2013–2015)
- NFL draft: 2016: 2nd round, 55th overall pick

Career history
- Cincinnati Bengals (2016–2023); Tennessee Titans (2024)

Awards and highlights
- 2× First-team All-ACC (2014, 2015); Second-team All-ACC (2013)

Career NFL statistics
- Receptions: 552
- Receiving yards: 6,390
- Receiving touchdowns: 31
- Stats at Pro Football Reference

Tyler Alexander Boyd (born November 15, 1994) is an American professional football wide receiver. He played college football for the Pittsburgh Panthers, and was selected by the Cincinnati Bengals in the second round of the 2016 NFL draft. He has also played for the Tennessee Titans.

== Early life ==
Boyd attended Clairton High School in Clairton, Pennsylvania, where he finished his high school football career ranking among the most productive performers in Western Pennsylvania history. He set a WPIAL record with 117 career touchdowns and finished as the fifth-leading rusher in WPIAL annals with 5,755 yards. He played diverse roles (running back, wide receiver, quarterback, defensive back, and punt returner) for Clairton, which went 48–0 in his three years as a starter and 63–1 (.984) in his four varsity seasons and won four WPIAL and four PIAA Class A titles. As a senior, Boyd rushed for 2,584 yards and 43 touchdowns, had 295 yards receiving on just 13 catches and led the WPIAL in scoring with 51 total touchdowns and 345 points. Boyd was selected to play in the Big 33 Football Classic (Western Pennsylvania vs. Eastern Ohio) and was named the game's MVP after accounting for five touchdowns (91-yard kick return, 68-yard halfback option pass, four-yard run and scoring catches of 16 and five yards). Boyd also played basketball at Clairton, helping lead the Bears to the WPIAL Class A title game and the PIAA playoffs as a senior, and was a baseball letterman as well.

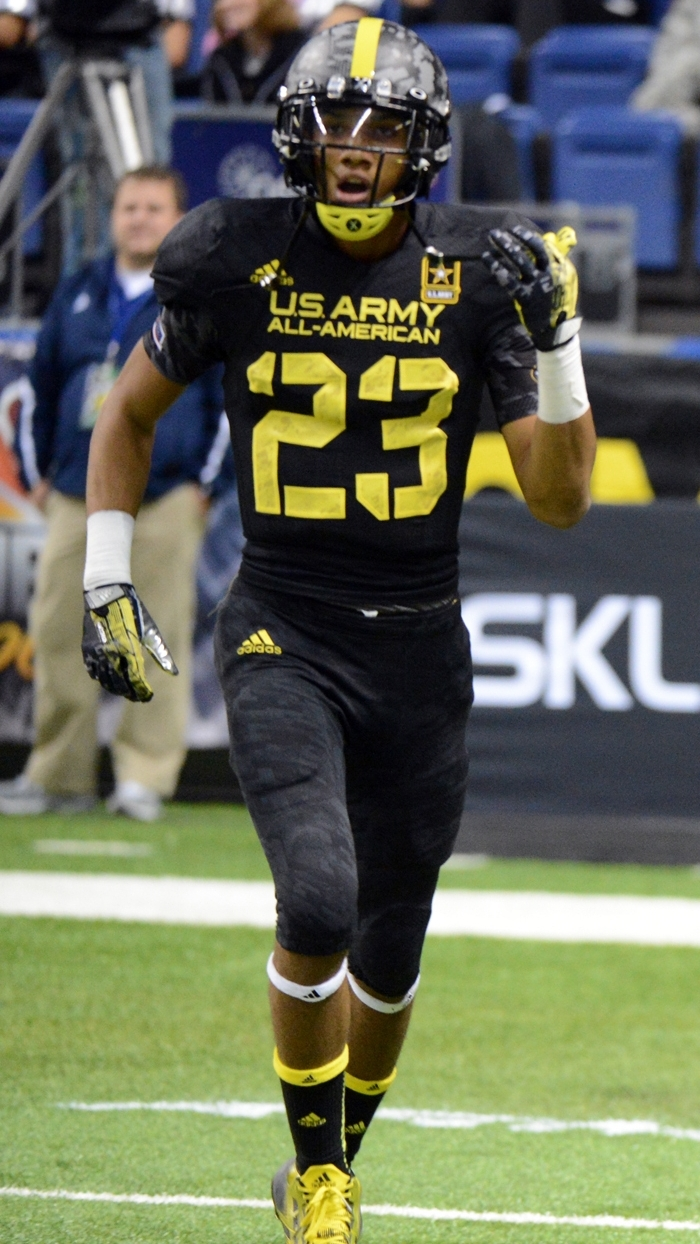
Boyd at the 2013 U.S. Army All-American Bowl

Following his senior season, Boyd was selected to play in the 2013 U.S. Army All-American Bowl in San Antonio's Alamodome, where he announced his decision to attend the University of Pittsburgh during NBC's live telecast. He was named to the Rivals 250 (No. 103) and ESPN 300 (No. 165) national prospect lists. He was rated as the No. 6 overall prospect in the state of Pennsylvania by Rivals.com and No. 8 by Scout.com, as well as the nation's No. 12 wide receiver according to both.

== College career ==
=== Freshman season (2013) ===
In 2013 as a true freshman, Boyd was the nation's most productive freshman receiver, setting Pitt freshman records for receptions with 85 and receiving yards with 1,174, both of which were previously held by Larry Fitzgerald (who had 69 catches for 1,005 yards in 2002). He had five 100-yard receiving games, topping Fitzgerald's freshman school-record total of four, and also set the Atlantic Coast Conference (ACC) record for receptions as a freshman, topping the mark held by Clemson's Sammy Watkins (82 catches in 2011).

Boyd was named ACC Rookie of the Week, 247Sports National True Freshman of the Week, and Athlon Sports National Co-Freshman of the Week for his performance in Pitt's 58–55 win at Duke, where he had eight catches for 154 yards (19.3 avg.) and a career-high three touchdowns. In a 49–27 win against New Mexico, he compiled 134 receiving yards on six catches (22.3 avg.), including a dazzling 34-yard touchdown grab in the back of the end zone on the final play of the first half; he also rushed for a 33-yard score against the Lobos, earning ACC Receiver of the Week and 247Sports National True Freshman of the Week honors for his performance. Boyd was known for making several highlight reel plays because of his hands and awareness for the sideline that helped him being selected All-ACC by the league's media (second team) and coaches (third team) as well as a Freshman All-American by Athlon, CollegeFootballNews.com, Football Writers Association of America (FWAA), Phil Steele, Sporting News, 247Sports, and ECAC Offensive Rookie of the Year. Boyd capped the 2013 season with a magnificent performance in the 2013 Little Caesars Pizza Bowl, compiling 242 all-purpose yards to help the Panthers defeat Bowling Green, 30–27; he had eight catches for a career-high 173 yards (21.6 avg.) and added a spectacular 54-yard punt return for a touchdown in the bowl victory. Boyd's receiving yardage against the Falcons set a Pitt bowl record, surpassing the 36-year-old mark of 163 set by Gordon Jones in the 1977 Gator Bowl against Clemson, while his punt return touchdown was Pitt's first since Darrelle Revis had a 73-yarder against West Virginia in 2006. Boyd's postseason performance earned him USA TODAY All-Bowl Team recognition.

2013 season breakdown
			Receiving					Rushing				
Date	Opponent	Result	Rec	Yards	Avg	Long	TDs	Att	Yards	Avg	Long	TDs
9/2	Florida State	L 13–41	2	26	13.0	17	0	3	54	18.0	20	0
9/14	New Mexico	W 49–27	6	134	22.3	51	1	2	39	19.5	33	1
9/21	@Duke	W 58–55	8	154	19.3	69	3	0	0	0.0	0	0
9/28	Virginia	W 14–3	7	111	15.9	37	0	2	5	2.5	4	0
10/12	@Virginia Tech	L 19–9	2	20	10.0	51	0	1	3	3.0	3	0
10/19	Old Dominion	W 35–24	6	46	7.7	9	0	1	5	5.0	5	0
10/26	@Navy	L 24–21	3	35	11.7	21	1	0	0	0.0	0	0
1 1/2	@Georgia Tech	L 21–10	11	118	10.7	15	1	0	0	0.0	0	0
11/9	Notre Dame	W 28–21	8	85	10.6	17	0	1	8	8.0	8	0
11/16	North Carolina	L 34–27	5	92	18.4	37	0	0	0	0.0	0	0
11/23	@Syracuse	W 17–16	10	82	8.2	16	0	1	−6	−6.0	0	0
11/29	Miami (FL)	L 41–31	9	98	10.9	19	1	0	0	0.0	0	0
12/26	vs. Bowling Green	W 30–27	8	173	21.6	62	0	0	0	0.0	0	0
2013 totals			85	1,174	13.8	62	7	11	108	9.8	33	1

=== Sophomore season (2014) ===
In his second year at Pitt, Boyd made an impact as a wide receiver and return man. He finished the season with 78 catches for 1,261 yards (16.2 avg.) and eight touchdowns. Boyd's 78 catches rank third on Pitt's single-season list, while his 1,261 receiving yards rank fourth. He totaled six 100-yard receiving games on the year, ranked second in the ACC and 17th nationally with an average of 97.0 receiving yards per game and third in the ACC and 32nd nationally with an average of 6.0 receptions per game. As a return specialist, he led the ACC and ranked 10th nationally with a 27.6-yard kickoff return average (16 for 442 yards) and ranked second in the ACC and 21st nationally with a 10.1-yard punt return average (16 for 162 yards). He also ranked second in the ACC and 14th nationally in all-purpose yards per game with 148.3.

Boyd had a season-high 10 receptions for 153 yards (15.3 avg.) against Iowa; with his performance, Boyd went over 100 career receptions, tying Larry Fitzgerald for fewest games needed to reach the century milestone for catches at Pitt (17 contests). He posted a season-high 160 receiving yards (second highest in his career) on five catches (32.0 avg.) with a 50-yard touchdown at North Carolina. Boyd received ACC Receiver of the Week honors for his outstanding performance in Pitt's 30–7 win over Syracuse, where he had seven receptions for 126 yards (18.0 avg.) against the Orange, including a 49-yard catch-and-run touchdown. He was honored as the ACC Specialist of the Week after compiling 262 all-purpose yards in a 35–23 win at Miami (FL) on November 29; in that game, Boyd totaled 190 yards on six kick returns (31.7 avg.) and added five receptions for 72 yards (14.4 avg.) with a 12-yard touchdown catch.

2014 season breakdown
			Receiving					Rushing				
Date	Opponent	Result	Rec	Yards	Avg	Long	TDs	Att	Yards	Avg	Long	TDs
8/30	Delaware	W 62–0	2	18	9.0	12	1	2	17	8.5	12	0
9/5	@Boston College	W 30–20	5	72	14.4	41	2	2	23	11.5	19	0
9/13	@FIU	W 42–25	4	50	12.5	19	1	1	−7	−7.0	0	0
9/20	Iowa	L 24–20	10	153	15.3	39	0	2	4	2.0	6	0
9/27	Akron	L 21–10	6	72	12.0	19	0	1	10	10.0	10	0
10/4	@Virginia	L 24–19	3	63	21.0	34	0	2	8	4.0	6	0
10/16	Virginia Tech	W 21–16	6	86	14.3	53	1	0	0	0.0	0	0
10/25	Georgia Tech	L 56–28	9	137	15.2	23	0	1	3	3.0	3	0
11/1	Duke	L 51–48^{2OT}	7	140	20.0	48	0	0	0	0.0	0	0
11/15	@North Carolina	L 40–35	5	160	32.0	50	1	1	5	5.0	5	0
11/22	Syracuse	W 30–7	7	126	18.0	49	1	0	0	0.0	0	0
11/29	@Miami (FL)	W 35–23	5	72	14.4	28	1	0	0	0.0	0	0
1/2	vs. Houston	L 35–34	9	112	12.4	24	0	0	0	0.0	0	0
2014 totals			78	1,261	16.2	53	8	12	63	5.3	19	0

=== Junior season (2015) ===
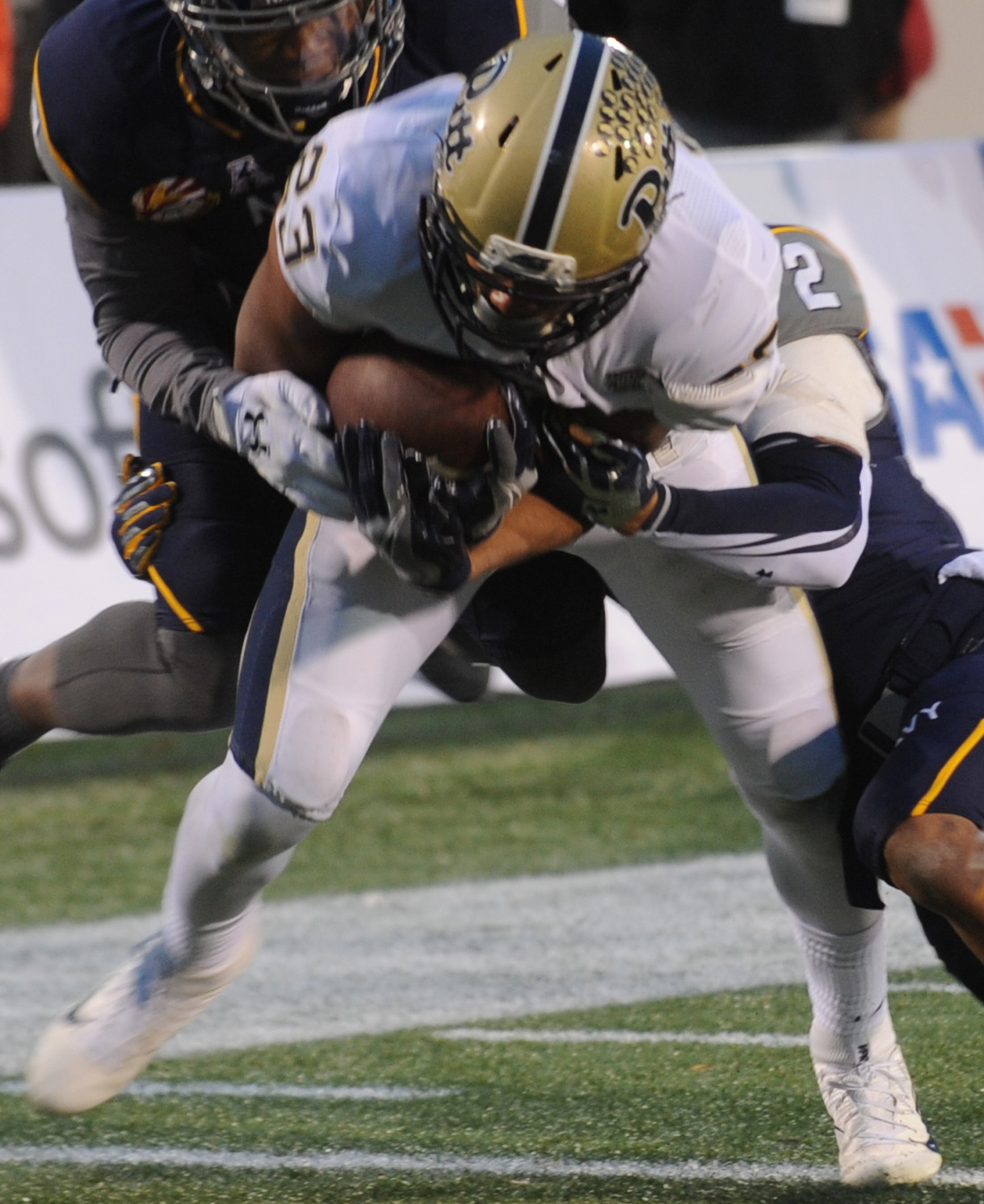
Boyd during the 2015 Military Bowl

2015 season breakdown
			Receiving					Rushing				
Date	Opponent	Result	Rec	Yards	Avg	Long	TDs	Att	Yards	Avg	Long	TDs
9/5	Youngstown State	W 45–37	0	0	0.0	0	0	0	0	0.0	0	0
9/12	@Akron	W 24–7	11	95	8.6	26	0	1	−6	−6.0	−6	0
9/19	@Iowa	L 27–24	10	131	13.1	36	1	2	7	3.5	5	0
10/3	@Virginia Tech	W 17–13	5	48	9.6	11	0	0	0	0.0	0	0
10/10	Virginia	W 26–19	7	54	7.7	22	1	1	7	7.0	7	0
10/17	@Georgia Tech	W 31–28	8	68	8.5	18	2	5	26	5.2	9	0
10/24	@Syracuse	W 23–20	12	93	7.8	24	0	6	34	5.7	11	0
10/29	North Carolina	L 26–19	10	89	8.9	19	0	2	8	4.0	6	0
11/7	Notre Dame	L 42–30	3	84	28.0	51	1	3	42	14.0	37	0
11/14	@Duke	W 31–13	3	38	12.7	21	0	8	79	9.9	27	0
11/21	Louisville	W 45–34	11	103	9.4	35	1	4	50	12.5	24	0
11/27	Miami (FL)	L 29–24	5	70	14.0	36	0	3	47	15.7	30	0
12/28	vs. Navy	L 44–28	6	53	8.8	15	0	5	55	11.0	21	0
2015 totals			91	926	10.2	51	6	40	349	8.7	37	0

== Professional career ==
=== Pre-draft ===
Coming out of college, Boyd was projected to be a second round draft pick by the majority of NFL Draft analysts. He was ranked the fifth best wide receiver out of 414 available by NFLDraftScouts.com.

External videos
- Boyd runs the 40 at the NFL Combine

Pre-draft measurables
Height	Weight	Arm length	Hand span	Wingspan	40-yard dash	10-yard split	20-yard split	20-yard shuttle	Three-cone drill	Vertical jump	Broad jump	Bench press
6 ft 1 1/2 in (1.87 m)	197 lb (89 kg)	32 in (0.81 m)	9 3/4 in (0.25 m)	6 ft 4 3/8 in (1.94 m)	4.52 s	1.54 s	2.64 s	4.35 s	6.90 s	34 in (0.86 m)	9 ft 11 in (3.02 m)	11 reps
All values from NFL Combine/Pro Day

=== Cincinnati Bengals ===
==== 2016 ====
The Cincinnati Bengals selected Boyd in the second round with the 55th overall pick in the 2016 NFL draft. He was the seventh wide receiver to be taken that year.

On May 16, 2016, the Bengals signed Boyd to a four-year, $4.25 million contract that includes $1.94 million guaranteed and a signing bonus of $1.29 million. Boyd entered the regular season as the third receiver on the depth chart behind veterans A. J. Green and Brandon LaFell. In the season opener against the New York Jets, he caught two passes from Andy Dalton for 24 yards. The following week, during a 16–24 loss to the Pittsburgh Steelers, he made six receptions for 78 receiving yards. In Week 6, against the New England Patriots, Boyd recorded a, at the time, career-high 79 yards on four receptions. On November 20, 2016, Boyd made six receptions for 54 receiving yards and caught a one-yard touchdown pass from Dalton for his first career touchdown in a 16–12 loss to the Buffalo Bills. He finished his rookie season with 54 receptions for 603 receiving yards and one touchdown.

==== 2017 ====
In his first four games in the 2017 season, Boyd totaled six receptions for 43 yards. Against the Bills, he suffered a knee injury and was forced to miss four games. In Week 12, against the Browns, he had his first receiving touchdown of the season. In Week 17, Boyd caught his third career touchdown on 4th and 12 with 53 seconds left, giving the Bengals a 31–27 lead over the Baltimore Ravens. That score would end up being the winning score, as the Bengals eliminated the Ravens from playoff contention for the 2017 season, and allowed the Buffalo Bills to clinch their first playoff berth since 1999. Thanks to the Bengals' victory, thousands of grateful Bills fans donated money to Dalton's personal charity. Most of the donations were in $17 increments in honor of the Bills breaking their 17-year playoff drought. Over 11,000 people donated a combined over $250,000 to the Andy & Jordan Dalton Foundation, while Tyler Boyd's charity of choice, the Western Pennsylvania Youth Athletic Association, received $50,000 in donations from Bills fans.

==== 2018 ====
In Week 2 of the 2018 season, Boyd recorded six receptions for 91 yards and a touchdown against the Ravens. In Week 3, he had six receptions for 132 receiving yards and a touchdown against the Carolina Panthers. He recorded another great outing in the next game against the Atlanta Falcons with 11 receptions for 100 receiving yards in the 37–36 victory. In Week 6, he recorded seven receptions for 62 yards and two touchdowns against the Steelers. He suffered an MCL sprain in Week 15 and was placed on injured reserve on December 28, 2018. He finished his breakout season as the Bengals leading receiver with 76 receptions for 1,028 yards and seven touchdowns.

==== 2019 ====
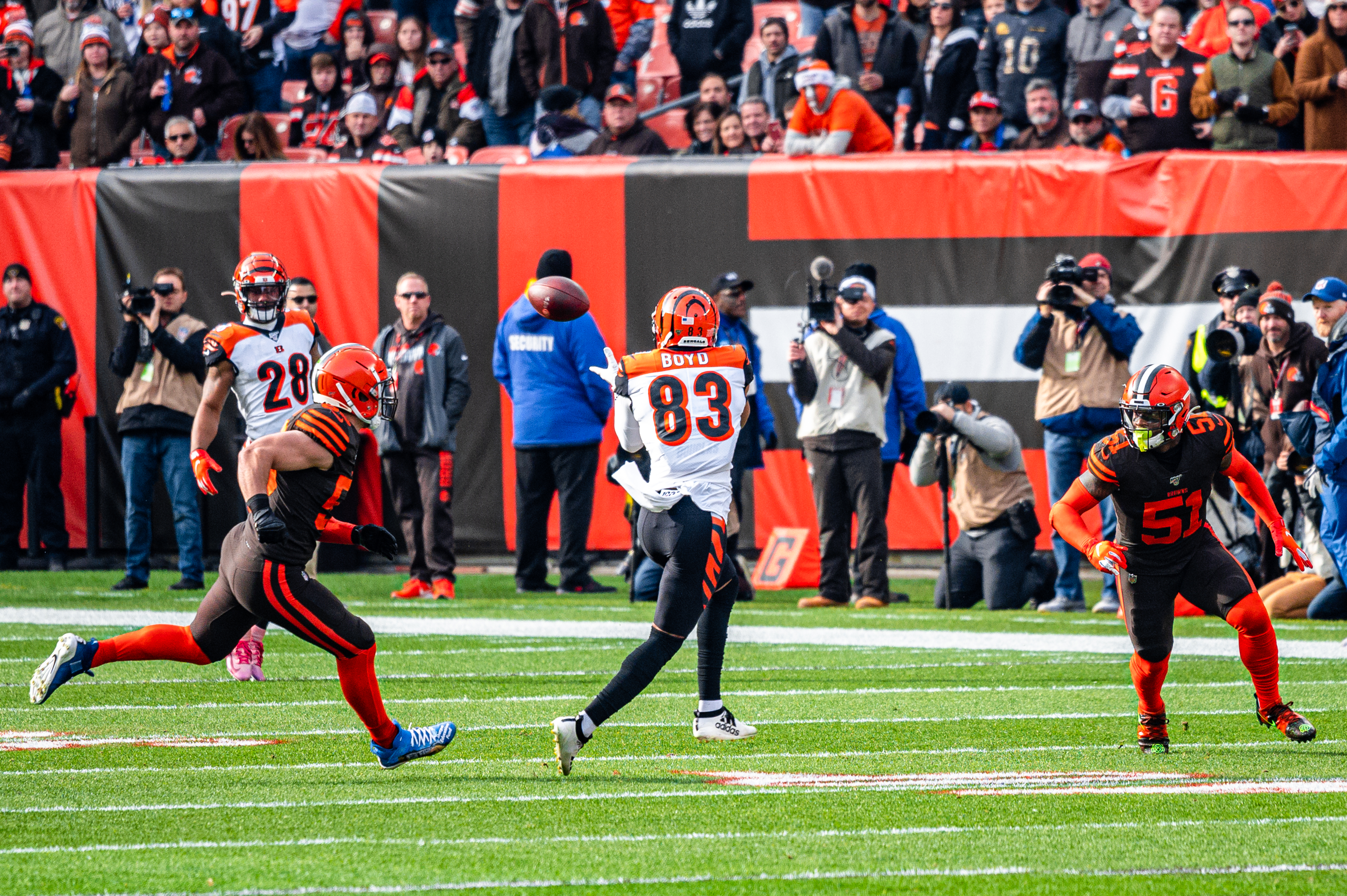
Boyd playing against the Browns in 2019

On July 23, 2019, Boyd signed a four-year, $43 million contract extension with the Bengals, keeping him under contract through the 2023 season. In Week 2 against the San Francisco 49ers, Boyd caught 10 passes for 122 yards as the Bengals lost 41–17. In Week 5 against the Arizona Cardinals, Boyd caught ten passes for 123 yards and a touchdown in the 26–23 loss. In Week 12 against the Steelers, Boyd caught five passes for 101 yards and a 47-yard touchdown in the 16–10 loss. During Week 16 against the Miami Dolphins, Boyd finished with nine catches for 128 yards and two touchdowns as the Bengals lost 35–38 in overtime. Overall, Boyd finished the 2019 season with 90 receptions for 1,046 receiving yards and five receiving touchdowns.

==== 2020 ====
In Week 2 against the Cleveland Browns on Thursday Night Football, Boyd caught seven passes for 72 yards and his first receiving touchdown of the season during the 35–30 loss. He had ten receptions for 125 yards in a Week 3 tie against the Philadelphia Eagles. In Week 7 against the Cleveland Browns, Boyd recorded 11 catches for 101 yards and a touchdown during the 37–34 loss. In Week 13 against the Dolphins, Boyd had one reception for a 72 yard touchdown. However, Boyd was ejected in the second quarter after he and cornerback Xavien Howard got into an altercation. Boyd finished the 2020 season with 79 receptions for 841 receiving yards and four receiving touchdowns.

==== 2021 ====
In the 2021 season, Boyd was part of a receiving unit that contained Ja'Marr Chase and Tee Higgins. He finished the 2021 season with 67 receptions for 828 receiving yards and five receiving touchdowns.

In the Wild Card Round against the Las Vegas Raiders, Boyd caught a touchdown on a controversial play where there was an inadvertent whistle. The Bengals went on to win 26–19. In the AFC Championship Game against the Kansas City Chiefs, Boyd had four receptions for 19 yards in the 27–24 overtime win, helping the Bengals advance to Super Bowl LVI, their first Super Bowl appearance since Super Bowl XXIII in 1988. In the Super Bowl, Boyd caught five passes for 48 yards, but dropped a crucial pass in the final minutes of the 4th quarter, his first drop of the season. The Bengals fell to the Rams 23–20.

==== 2022 ====
In Week 3, against the Jets, Boyd had four receptions for 105 receiving yards and a touchdown in the 27–12 victory. In Week 7, against the Falcons, he had eight receptions for 155 receiving yards and one touchdown in the 35–17 victory. In 16 games in the 2022 season, he had 58 receptions for 762 yards and five touchdowns.

==== 2023 ====
In the 2023 season, Boyd appeared in all 17 games. He finished with 67 receptions for 667 yards and two touchdowns.

=== Tennessee Titans ===
On May 13, 2024, Boyd signed a one-year contract with the Tennessee Titans, joining head coach Brian Callahan who was his offensive coordinator with the Bengals. He appeared in 16 games and had eight starts, finishing with 39 receptions for 390 yards and no touchdowns. This season saw Boyd's lowest number of receiving yards since 2017 and was his first in the NFL without a receiving touchdown.

== Career statistics ==
=== NFL ===
Legend
**Bold**	Career high

==== Regular season ====
Year	Team	Games		Receiving						Rushing					Fumbles	
Year	Team	GP	GS	Tgt	Rec	Yds	Avg	Lng	TD	Att	Yds	Avg	Lng	TD	Fum	Lost
2016	CIN	16	2	81	54	603	11.2	30	1	4	**58**	**14.5**	**39**	0	1	1
2017	CIN	10	1	32	22	225	10.2	49T	2	0	0	0.0	0	0	0	0
2018	CIN	14	14	108	76	1,028	**13.5**	49	**7**	2	3	1.5	5	0	0	0
2019	CIN	16	**15**	**148**	**90**	**1,046**	11.6	47	5	4	23	5.8	10	0	**2**	**2**
2020	CIN	15	8	110	79	841	10.6	**72T**	4	**5**	49	9.8	25	0	1	0
2021	CIN	16	10	94	67	828	12.4	68	5	2	22	11.0	14	0	1	0
2022	CIN	16	14	82	58	762	13.1	60	5	0	0	0.0	0	0	0	0
2023	CIN	**17**	13	98	67	667	10.0	64	2	2	11	5.5	6	0	0	0
2024	TEN	16	8	57	39	390	10.0	40	0	1	3	3.0	3	0	0	0
Career		136	85	810	552	6,390	11.6	72T	31	19	166	8.7	39	0	5	3

==== Postseason ====
Year	Team	Games		Receiving						Rushing					Fumbles	
Year	Team	GP	GS	Tgt	Rec	Yds	Avg	Lng	TD	Att	Yds	Avg	Lng	TD	Fum	Lost
2021	CIN	**4**	**3**	**20**	**15**	**110**	7.3	16T	**1**	1	3	3.0	3	0	0	0
2022	CIN	3	**3**	7	6	89	**14.8**	**24**	0	0	0	0.0	0	0	0	0
Career		7	6	27	21	199	9.5	24	1	1	3	3.0	3	0	0	0

=== College ===
Year	Team	Receiving				Rushing			
Year	Team	Rec	Yards	Avg	TD	Att	Yds	Avg	TD
2013	Pittsburgh	85	1,174	13.8	7	11	108	9.8	1
2014	Pittsburgh	78	1,261	16.2	8	12	63	5.3	0
2015	Pittsburgh	85	926	10.3	6	35	294	8.4	0
Career		248	3,361	13.3	21	58	465	8.0	1
