= Adam Scheier =

American football player and coach (born 1973)

Current position
- Title: Special teams coordinator
- Team: Florida State
- Conference: ACC

Biographical details
- Born: April 12, 1973 (age 53); Bronx, New York, U.S.

Playing career
- 1992–1995: Dartmouth

Coaching career (HC unless noted)
- 1996: Dartmouth (DB)
- 1997–1999: Columbia (SS/OLB)
- 2000–2001: Princeton (ST/WR)
- 2002–2004: Lehigh (ST/RB)
- 2005–2008: Lehigh (ST/WR)
- 2009–2013: Bowling Green (ST/TE)
- 2013: Bowling Green (interim HC)
- 2014–2016: Wake Forest (ST/TE)
- 2017: Ohio State (kicking)
- 2018: Texas Tech (ST)
- 2019: Mississippi State (consultant)
- 2020–2021: Rutgers (ST)
- 2022–2024: Temple (ST/TE)
- 2025: UNLV (ST)
- 2026–present: Florida State (ST)

Head coaching record
- Overall: 0–1
- Bowls: 0–1

Adam Scheier (born April 12, 1973) is an American football coach and former player. He currently serves as the special teams coordinator for Florida State. He previously served as the Bowling Green interim head coach during the 2013 Little Caesars Pizza Bowl, as Dave Clawson had left to take the head coaching job at Wake Forest University. He also served as the special teams coordinator for the Rutgers Scarlet Knights football team.

== Playing career ==
Scheier played college football at Dartmouth College where he was named the Special Teams Player of the Year as a senior. He earned his degree in psychology from Dartmouth shortly after his playing career concluded in 1995. He began coaching at Dartmouth the following year.

== Head coaching record ==
Year	Team	Overall	Conference	Standing	Bowl/playoffs
Bowling Green Falcons (Mid-American Conference) (2013)
2013	Bowling Green	0–1	0–1		L Little Caesars
Wake Forest:		0–1	0–0		
Total:		0–1			
