= 2013 Little Caesars Pizza Bowl =

| Pittsburgh Panthers | Bowling Green Falcons |
| (6–6) | (10–3) |
| ACC | MAC |
| 30 | 27 |
| Head coach: Paul Chryst | Head coach: Adam Scheier (interim) |
| | 1 | 2 | 3 | 4 | Total |
|---|---|---|---|---|---|
| Pittsburgh | 7 | 10 | 3 | 10 | 30 |
| Bowling Green | 3 | 7 | 10 | 7 | 27 |
- Date: December 26, 2013
- Season: 2013
- Stadium: Ford Field
- Location: Detroit, Michigan
- MVP: James Conner (RB) – Pitt; Lineman of the Game: Aaron Donald – Pitt
- Favorite: Bowling Green by 5½
- Referee: Charles Lewis (Sun Belt)
- Attendance: 26,259

United States TV coverage
- Network: ESPN
- Announcers: Dave LaMont (Play-by-Play); Ray Bentley (Analyst); Niki Noto (Sidelines)

The 2013 Little Caesars Pizza Bowl is an American college football bowl game that was played on December 26, 2013 at Ford Field in Detroit, Michigan. The 17th edition of Little Caesars Pizza Bowl featured the Pittsburgh Panthers from the Atlantic Coast Conference against the Bowling Green Falcons from the Mid-American Conference. It was one of the 2013–14 bowl games that concluded the 2013 FBS football season.

Pittsburgh defeated Bowling Green by a score of 30–27. Pittsburgh running back James Conner, who rushed for 229 yards, was named the game's most valuable player.

The game was the final edition of the Little Caesars Pizza Bowl; it was displaced by the Quick Lane Bowl, organized by the Detroit Lions, beginning in 2014.

== Teams ==
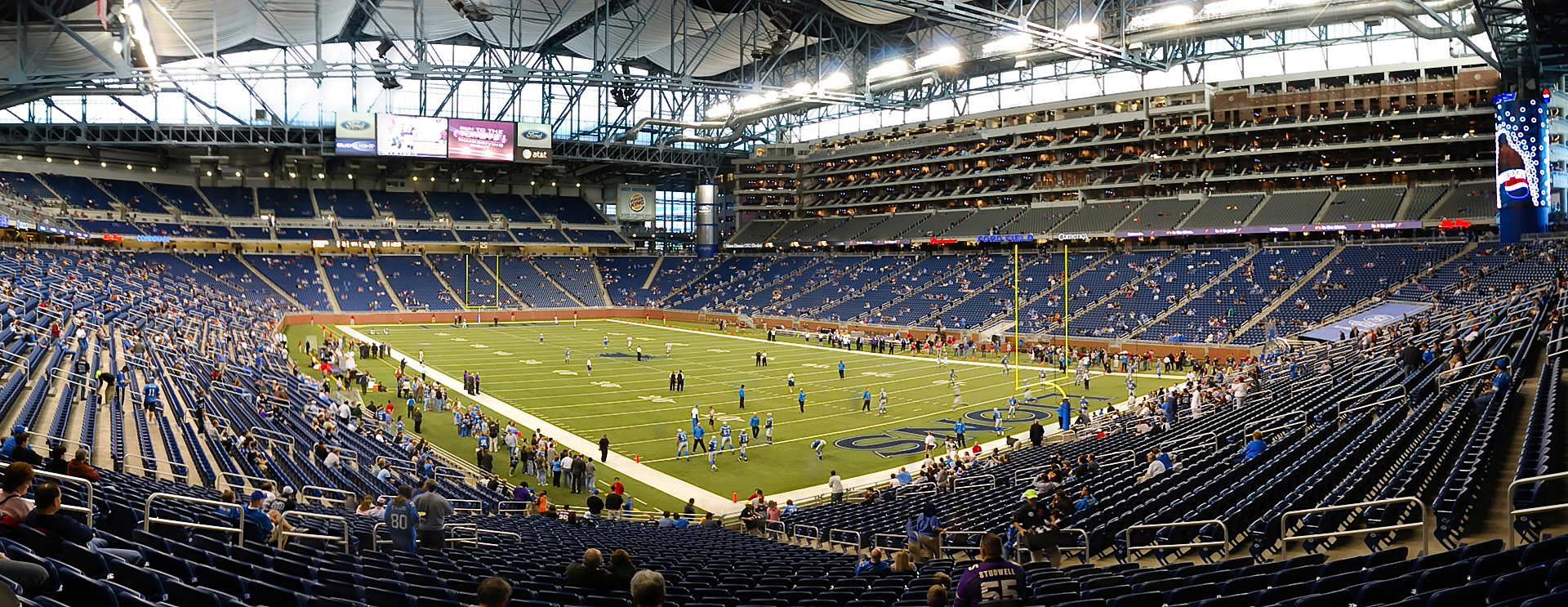
The 2013 Little Caesars Pizza Bowl was played at Ford Field.

The 2013 Little Caesars Pizza Bowl marked the fourth time Pittsburgh and Bowling Green have played each other. Because Pittsburgh was not selected for one of the ACC's seven contractual bowl tie-ins and with the Big Ten having just seven bowl-eligible teams and not able to send a team to the Little Caesar's Pizza Bowl, Pittsburgh was selected. Pittsburgh came into the game holding a 2–1 lead in the series.

=== Pittsburgh ===
In the Panthers' first season in the ACC, Pittsburgh finished 6th in the Coastal Division with a 6–6 (3–5 conference) record. The Panthers' offense was led by wide receivers Devin Street (who was unable to play in the game due to injuries) and Tyler Boyd, as well as senior quarterback Tom Savage. Pittsburgh's defense was led by All-American defensive tackle Aaron Donald, who entered the game with 10 sacks on the season. The Panthers were coached by Paul Chryst.

=== Bowling Green ===
Bowling Green entered the game as the Mid-American Conference champions. The Falcons finished 1st in the MAC East Division with a 10–3 (7–1 conference) record. In the 2013 MAC Championship Game, BGSU defeated Northern Illinois 47–27 to spoil the Huskies' BCS hopes. The Falcons' offense was led by quarterback Matt Johnson, who entered the game with 3,195 passing yards and 23 passing touchdowns. BGSU's defense led the MAC in scoring, rushing, passing and total defense. The Falcons were coached by Adam Scheier, who took over head coaching duties after Dave Clawson agreed to become the head coach at Wake Forest.

== Game summary ==
BGSU scored first on a 28-yard field goal from Tyler Tate. Pittsburgh responded on the next drive with a 15-yard James Conner touchdown run to take a 7–3 lead. In the second quarter, Pittsburgh expanded their lead to 10–3 after Chris Blewitt kicked a 25-yard field goal. Pittsburgh took a 17–3 lead after the Panthers' Tyler Boyd returned a punt 54-yards for a touchdown. On the ensuing drive, Bowling Green looked like it would have to punt inside their own 30-yard line after Matt Johnson was sacked. However, an unsportsmanlike conduct penalty was called on Pittsburgh defensive tackle Aaron Donald, giving the Falcons a first down. Bowling Green would later score on the drive on a 29-yard touchdown pass from Matt Johnson to Alex Bayer to make it 17–10. The game remained 17–10 going into the half. Pittsburgh quarterback Tom Savage suffered a rib injury in the first half of the game and was unable to play in the second half. Savage was replaced by Chad Voytik for the second half of the game.

Bowling Green tied the game 17–17 on the first play in the second half with a 94-yard kickoff return by BooBoo Gates. On the following Pittsburgh drive, the Panthers drove to Bowling Green's 21-yard line. However, Pittsburgh was unable to take the lead when Chris Blewitt missed a 39-yard field goal. On the subsequent drive, Bowling Green drove to Pittsburgh's 28-yard line and took a 20–17 lead on a 46-yard field goal from Tyler Tate. On the subsequent drive, Pittsburgh tied the game 20–20 with a 28-yard field goal from Chris Blewitt. The game remained tied 20–20 going into the fourth quarter.

Pittsburgh took 27–20 lead on a 5-yard touchdown run from Chad Voytik. On the subsequent Bowling Green drive, the Falcons tied the game 27–27 with a 15-yard touchdown pass from Matt Johnson to Ryan Burbrink with 4:42 left in the game. Pittsburgh retook the lead on a 39-yard field goal from Chris Blewitt with 1:17 remaining in the game. Bowling Green had one final chance to tie or win the game. However, after the Falcons committed a holding penalty and Matt Johnson was sacked on back-to-back plays, the Falcons needed to convert a 4th and 40 situation to continue the drive. The Falcons were unable to convert, however, sealing the victory for Pittsburgh.

== Scoring summary ==
Scoring summary

| Quarter | Time | Drive | | | Team | Scoring information | Score | |
| Quarter | Time | Plays | Yards | TOP | Team | Scoring information | Pittsburgh | Bowling Green |
|---|---|---|---|---|---|---|---|---|
| 1 | 4:26 | 11 | 50 | 5:49 | BGSU | 28-yard field goal by Tyler Tate | 0 | 3 |
| 1 | 0:58 | 7 | 50 | 3:28 | Pitt | James Conner 15-yard touchdown run, Chris Blewitt kick good | 7 | 3 |
| 2 | 8:29 | 10 | 85 | 5:23 | Pitt | 25-yard field goal by Blewitt | 10 | 3 |
| 2 | 6:43 | | | | Pitt | Punt returned 54 yards for touchdown by Tyler Boyd, Blewitt kick good | 17 | 3 |
| 2 | 1:28 | 10 | 67 | 5:15 | BGSU | Alex Bayer 29-yard touchdown reception from Matt Johnson, Tate kick good | 17 | 10 |
| 3 | 14:49 | | | | BGSU | Kickoff returned 94 yards for touchdown by BooBoo Gates, Tate kick good | 17 | 17 |
| 3 | 9:52 | 9 | 51 | 3:09 | BGSU | 46-yard field goal by Tate | 17 | 20 |
| 3 | 5:59 | 10 | 65 | 3:53 | Pitt | 28-yard field goal by Blewitt | 20 | 20 |
| 4 | 9:31 | 6 | 98 | 3:26 | Pitt | Chad Voytik 5-yard touchdown run, Blewitt kick good | 27 | 20 |
| 4 | 4:42 | 9 | 75 | 4:49 | BGSU | Ryan Burbrink 15-yard touchdown reception from Johnson, Tate kick good | 27 | 27 |
| 4 | 1:17 | 7 | 51 | 3:25 | Pitt | 39-yard field goal by Blewitt | 30 | 27 |
| "TOP" = time of possession. For other American football terms, see Glossary of American football. | | | | | | | 30 | 27 |

=== Statistics ===
| Statistic | Pitt | BGSU |
|---|---|---|
| First downs | 21 | 18 |
| Total offense, plays – yards | 61–487 | 67–289 |
| Rushes-yards (net) | 39–255 | 34–10 |
| Passing yards (net) | 232 | 279 |
| Passes, Comp-Att-Int | 13–22–0 | 21–33–0 |
| Time of Possession | 28:50 | 31:10 |

Pittsburgh running back James Conner was named the game's most valuable player. Conner rushed for 229 yards on 26 carries and had one rushing touchdown. Conner also broke the Pittsburgh bowl record for yards rushing, a record that was once held by Tony Dorsett.

Pittsburgh outgained Bowling Green 487–289 in total yards. The Falcons had 279 receiving yards, but were held to only 10 rushing yards.

Tyler Boyd was Pittsburgh leading receiver, who had 8 catches for 173 yards. With his performance, Boyd also broke the Pittsburgh record for most receiving yards by a freshman, a record that was once held by Larry Fitzgerald. Tom Savage was Pittsburgh leading passer, completing 8 of his 13 passes for 124 yards. Chad Voytik, who played in the second half after Savage was injured, completed 5 of his 9 passes for 108 yards. Voytik was also Pittsburgh's second leading rusher, rushing twice for 24 yards and a touchdown.

Bowling Green's leading receiver was Shaun Joplin, who had 6 catches for 86 yards. Heath Jackson was the Falcons' second leading receiver, catching 5 passes for 78 yards. Bowling Green quarterback Matt Johnson completed 20 of his 32 passes for 272 yards and 2 touchdowns. The Falcons' leading rusher was Travis Greene, who rushed for 39 yards on 18 carries.
