= Bryan Thompson (American football) =

American football player (born 1999)

Profile
- Position: Wide receiver

Personal information
- Born: April 7, 1999 (age 27); Moreno Valley, California, U.S.
- Listed height: 6 ft 1 in (1.85 m)
- Listed weight: 195 lb (88 kg)

Career information
- High school: Rancho Verde (Moreno Valley)
- College: Utah (2017–2020); Arizona State (2021–2022)
- NFL draft: 2023: undrafted

Career history
- Buffalo Bills (2023–2024)*; BC Lions (2026)*
- * Offseason or practice squad member only
- Stats at Pro Football Reference

Bryan Thompson (born April 7, 1999) is an American professional football wide receiver. He played college football for the Utah Utes and Arizona State Sun Devils.

== Early life ==
Thompson grew up in Moreno Valley, California and attended Rancho Verde High School where he lettered in football and track & field. In his high school career, Thompson completed 135 receptions for 2,636 yards and 27 touchdowns. Thompson was a three-star ranked recruit and would decide to commit to play college football at the University of Utah over offers from Nebraska, Oregon, Boise State, Arizona, Arizona State, Colorado, Indiana, Oregon State, UNLV, Washington and Washington State.

== College career ==
=== Utah ===
During Thompson's true freshman season in 2017, he played in 12 games and started one of them against Stanford. He finished the season with five receptions for 77 yards with an average of 15.4 yards per catch. During the 2018 season, he played in only four games due to him battling injuries. He made one catch for 31 yards in the 2018 Holiday Bowl against Northwestern. During the 2019 season, he appeared in 12 games and started nine of them. He finished the season with being second on the team in terms of receiving yards with 18 catches for 461 yards and three touchdowns with an average of 25.6 yards per catch. During the 2020 season, he played in all five games and started two of them. He finished the season with nine receptions for 187 yards with one touchdown along with one rush for nine yards and a touchdown with an average of 20.8 yards per catch.

On February 3, 2021, Thompson announced that he has entered the transfer portal. On February 18, 2021, he announced that he would be transferring to Arizona State.

=== Arizona State ===
During the 2021 season, Thompson appeared in 11 games and started four of them. He finished the season with 13 catches and 130 yards. During the 2022 season, he appeared in 11 games and started the last seven of them. He finished the season with 25 catches and 377 yards.

== Professional career ==
Pre-draft measurables
Height	Weight	Arm length	Hand span	40-yard dash	10-yard split	20-yard split	20-yard shuttle	Three-cone drill	Vertical jump	Broad jump	Bench press
6 ft 1 1/2 in (1.87 m)	195 lb (88 kg)	32 5/8 in (0.83 m)	9 3/4 in (0.25 m)	4.54 s	1.59 s	2.62 s	4.31 s	7.09 s	34 in (0.86 m)	11 ft 4 in (3.45 m)	9 reps
All values from Pro Day

=== Buffalo Bills ===
On May 18, 2023, Thompson was signed to the Buffalo Bills as an undrafted free agent after going unselected in the 2023 NFL draft. Thompson was released on August 29, 2023 but was re-signed to the practice squad two days later. He signed a reserve/future contract on January 22, 2024. On August 13, 2024, Thompson was waived with an injury designation and was ultimately released by the team.

=== BC Lions ===
On January 30, 2026, Thompson signed with the BC Lions of the Canadian Football League (CFL). On May 15, 2026, Thompson was released by the Lions.

On August 19, 2026, Thompson re-signed with the Lions, this time on a practice roster contract. He was released on September 3, 2026.
