= Geep Chryst =

American football coach (born 1962)

Profile
- Position: Football Coach / Pro scout

Personal information
- Born: June 25, 1962 (age 64); Madison, Wisconsin, U.S.

Career information
- College: Princeton (B.A.); Wisconsin (M.A.)

Career history
- Wisconsin–Platteville (1987) Quarterbacks, wide receivers; Wisconsin (1988) Offensive graduate assistant; Wyoming (1989) Offensive line; Wyoming (1990) Quarterbacks; Orlando Thunder (1991) Wide receivers, running backs; Chicago Bears (1991–1995) Director of research, quality control; Arizona Cardinals (1996) Tight ends; Arizona Cardinals (1997–1998) Quarterbacks; San Diego Chargers (1999–2000) Offensive coordinator, quarterbacks; Arizona Cardinals (2001–2003) Quarterbacks; Carolina Panthers (2006–2010) Tight ends, offensive quality control; San Francisco 49ers (2011–2014) Quarterbacks; San Francisco 49ers (2015) Offensive coordinator; Denver Broncos (2017–2018) Tight ends; California (2021–2022) Tight ends
- Coaching profile at Pro Football Reference

George Patrick "Geep" Chryst (born June 25, 1962) is an American football coach and scout. He most recently was a pro scout for the Jacksonville Jaguars of the National Football League (NFL). Chryst has 25 years of NFL coaching experience, working as an offensive coordinator, quarterbacks coach and tight ends coach. In 13 of the 25 seasons coaching in the NFL his offense ranked in the top ten in either rushing, passing or points scored. He has also coached in college football, most recently for the California Golden Bears.

When in San Francisco from 2011 to 2014 he coached Alex Smith and Colin Kaepernick. The 49ers won 54 games in that span and both quarterbacks set career records for passer rating in 2012 when Kaepernick took over for Smith Week 11 in a Monday Night Football win over the Chicago Bears. Neither QB had enough throws to qualify for the league rating title but Smith (104.3 rating) would have finished 3rd and Kaepernick (98.3 rating) would have been 7th. No NFL team has had two quarterbacks finish in the Top 10 the same season.

Chryst worked as San Francisco's offensive coordinator in 2015 when Blaine Gabbert replaced Kaepernick in Week 9. Kaepernick had played well in games early but struggled in losses to division foes Arizona, Seattle, and St. Louis. Gabbert went on that year to lead the NFL in Red Zone Passing (120.5). In his only year as offensive coordinator, the 49ers finished last in scoring and second to last in yards per game. After the team went 5–11 in 2015, he was fired.

He also has NFL experience with Denver (2017–18) Carolina (2006–10), Arizona (2001–03, 1996–98), San Diego (1999–2000) and Chicago (1991–95).

Chryst is credited with developing the original Draft Value Chart in 1993. Chicago Bears head coach Dave Wannstedt had replaced Mike Ditka and wanted a chart that would mimic the philosophy that Jimmy Johnson was implementing in Dallas, where Wannstedt was his defensive coordinator. The chart was used on draft day by a handful of teams who kept it hidden from others to create value for the trading of draft picks. Wannstedt shared the chart back to Johnson, but others made copies, and it worked its way throughout the league.

In addition to his coaching and quality control duties Chryst has specialized in football analytics. He was involved in a Silicon Valley startup as a founder of Game Analytics, Inc. and has consulted both college and NFL teams on game management.

== Early life ==
Chryst played football and baseball at Princeton University. Chryst earned his bachelor's degree in history from Princeton. He then went on to receive his master's degree in educational administration from Wisconsin.

== Coaching career ==
=== College ===
Chryst first became a coach at the University of Wisconsin–Platteville in 1987. While there, he also helped at the Chicago Bears training camp. In 1988, he was a coach with the Wisconsin Badgers before spending the next two years as the quarterbacks and offensive line coach of the Wyoming Cowboys. He then began coaching professional teams, beginning as the wide receivers/running backs coach for the Orlando Thunder of the World League in 1991.

After 25 years of coaching in the NFL, Chryst joined the California Golden Bears football staff in 2021 as tight ends coach. The team finished the season winning four of the last fives games and against rival Stanford set a Big Game record with 636 yards of total offense in the 41–11 win. Under his training, Jake Tonges, a former walk-on, had a career year in 2021 and made the Chicago Bears 53-man roster in 2022. In 2022, Chryst was named the offensive coordinator & play caller for the last two games of the year. The Golden Bears beat Stanford to keep the Stanford Axe and nearly upset 17th ranked UCLA the following week. In the UCLA game, Cal quarterback Jack Plummer threw for four TD passes and completed 14 consecutive throws.

=== NFL ===
Chryst began his NFL coaching career with the Chicago Bears in 1991, working for five seasons as the team's director of research/quality control. In the spring of 1992, Chryst took a 15-day hiatus from the Bears to long snap in three playoff games for the Orlando Thunder. Chryst then worked two different three-year stints with Arizona, coaching tight ends (1996–97) and quarterbacks (1998, 2001–03). In between Chryst's time in Arizona, he worked two seasons with the Chargers (1999–00) as the offensive coordinator and quarterbacks coach. Chryst helped implement the no-huddle offense in San Diego in 1999.

Chryst joined the Carolina Panthers in 2006 and spent five seasons as the tight ends coach and offensive quality control coach alongside Mike McCoy. Chryst left the Panthers after the 2010 season to become the quarterbacks coach for the San Francisco 49ers. He was eventually promoted to offensive coordinator prior to the 2015 season, under head coach Jim Tomsula. During Chryst's five seasons in San Francisco, the 49ers advanced to three consecutive NFC Championship Games (2011–13) and lost in Super Bowl XLVII. Chryst helped San Francisco's passing offense rank among the most efficient units in the NFL from 2011 to 2014 while working with QBs Alex Smith and Colin Kaepernick.

=== Hub Football ===
Chryst worked for Hub Football, run by player agent Don Yee. Chryst started with the company at its inception in 2019. Hub offers camps for football players looking to sign with a professional team.

== Personal life ==
Chryst is the brother of former Wisconsin Badgers head football coach Paul Chryst and former Mid-American Conference commissioner Rick Chryst. Their father, George Chryst, was an assistant at Wisconsin and then became the head coach and athletic director at the University of Wisconsin–Platteville. His oldest son, Keller Chryst, played quarterback at the University of Tennessee. Prior to Tennessee he went 11–2 as a starter at quarterback for Stanford University (2014–17). His .846 winning percentage is the highest all-time for Stanford quarterbacks with a minimum of 10 starts. His younger son Jackson Chryst also plays QB, being named High School Player of the Year by the San Francisco Chronicle in 2018. Jackson attended Oregon State, where he was on the Beavers 2019 and 2020 teams, before transferring in 2021 to play quarterback at the University of Wisconsin–Whitewater.
