= Rick Chryst =

American football commissioner

Biographical details
- Education: University of Notre Dame, Duke University School of Law

Playing career
- 1979–1983: Notre Dame

Administrative career (AD unless noted)
- 1983: Navy (assistant SID)
- 1989–1992: SWC (Assistant commissioner)
- 1992–1999: ACC (assistant commissioner)
- 1999–2009: MAC (commissioner)

Richard Chryst is an American former college football commissioner who now works in the private sector with Dietz Sports and Entertainment. He served as the commissioner of the Mid-American Conference (MAC) from 1999 to 2009.

== College and early career ==
Chryst played baseball at the University of Notre Dame from 1979 to 1983. In 1982, he played collegiate summer baseball with the Cotuit Kettleers of the Cape Cod Baseball League. He earned a BA in economics in 1983.

In 1983, Chryst was hired as the assistant sports information director at the United States Naval Academy. He then attended Duke University, where he earned a Juris Doctor from Duke University School of Law in 1989. Later that year, Chryst worked in the administration of the Southwest Conference until it dissolved in 1996. He then became the assistant commissioner of the Atlantic Coast Conference.

== Mid-American Conference ==
On May 11, 1999, Chryst replaced Jerry Ippoliti as commissioner of the Mid-American Conference (MAC). As commissioner, Chryst grew the conference's presence by signing a TV contract with ESPN to air MAC football games nationally and moving the football championship game to Ford Field in Detroit, and the basketball tournament to Quicken Loans Arena in Cleveland. During his time as MAC Commissioner, Chryst was also chair of the Division I commissioners and president of the Collegiate Commissioners Association. Chryst announced in January 2009 that he would leave the conference upon completion of his contract on June 30, 2009. His tenure made him the conference's third longest serving commissioner.

== Personal ==
He is the brother of former Wisconsin Badgers head coach Paul Chryst and position coach Geep Chryst. Their father, George, was an assistant at Wisconsin and then became the head coach and athletic director at the University of Wisconsin-Platteville.
