= 2024 USC Trojans football team =

American college football season

2024 USC Trojans football

Las Vegas Bowl champion

Las Vegas Bowl, W 35–31 vs. Texas A&M
- Conference: Big Ten Conference
- Record: 7–6 (4–5 Big Ten)
- Head coach: Lincoln Riley (3rd season)
- Offensive coordinator: Josh Henson (3rd season)
- Offensive scheme: Air raid
- Defensive coordinator: D'Anton Lynn (1st season)
- Co-defensive coordinator: Eric Henderson (1st season)
- Base defense: 4–3
- Home stadium: Los Angeles Memorial Coliseum

Uniform

2024 Big Ten Conference football standings
	Conf.			Overall
Team	W		L	W		L
No. 3 Oregon y$^	9	–	0	13	–	1
No. 10 Indiana ^	8	–	1	11	–	2
No. 5 Penn State y^	8	–	1	13	–	3
No. 1 Ohio State #^	7	–	2	14	–	2
No. 16 Illinois	6	–	3	10	–	3
Iowa	6	–	3	8	–	5
Michigan	5	–	4	8	–	5
Minnesota	5	–	4	8	–	5
USC	4	–	5	7	–	6
Rutgers	4	–	5	7	–	6
Washington	4	–	5	6	–	7
Nebraska	3	–	6	7	–	6
UCLA	3	–	6	5	–	7
Wisconsin	3	–	6	5	–	7
Northwestern	2	–	7	4	–	8
Maryland	1	–	8	4	–	8
Michigan State†	0	–	6	0	–	7
Purdue	0	–	9	1	–	11
Championship: Oregon 45, Penn State 37
# – College Football Playoff champion; ^ – College Football Playoff participant; $ – Conference champion; y – Championship game participant; † — NCAA vacated all wins for Michigan State (5–7, 3–6); Rankings from AP Poll

The 2024 USC Trojans football team represented the University of Southern California (USC) as a first-year member of the Big Ten Conference during the 2024 NCAA Division I FBS football season. The team was led by their third-year head coach Lincoln Riley, and played their home games at Los Angeles Memorial Coliseum located in Los Angeles.

The 2024 season was the Trojans' first year in the Big Ten Conference after being in the Pac-12 Conference and its predecessor, the Pacific Coast Conference for over a century.

== Preseason ==
USC Spring Football Game Set for April 20, 2024 at the Los Angeles Memorial Coliseum.

=== Spring Game ===
USC Defense (White) vs USC Offense (Cardinal Red) Spring Game

Quarter	1	2	Total
Defense (White)	33	10	43
Offense (Cardinal Red)	14	14	28

at Los Angeles Memorial Coliseum • Los Angeles, California

- Date: April 20, 2024
- Game time: 12:00 p.m. PST
- TV announcers (Pac-12 Network): JB Long (play-by-play), Yogi Roth (analyst)

== Schedule ==
Date	Time	Opponent	Rank	Site	TV	Result	Attendance
September 1	4:30 p.m.	vs. No. 13 LSU*	No. 23	Allegiant Stadium; Paradise, NV (Vegas Kickoff Classic)	ABC	W 27–20	63,969
September 7	8:00 p.m.	Utah State*	No. 13	Los Angeles Memorial Coliseum; Los Angeles, CA	BTN	W 48–0	68,110
September 21	12:30 p.m.	at No. 18 Michigan	No. 11	Michigan Stadium; Ann Arbor, MI	CBS	L 24–27	110,702
September 28	12:30 p.m.	Wisconsin	No. 13	Los Angeles Memorial Coliseum; Los Angeles, CA	CBS	W 38–21	74,118
October 5	4:30 p.m.	at Minnesota	No. 11	Huntington Bank Stadium; Minneapolis, MN	BTN	L 17–24	50,913
October 12	12:30 p.m.	No. 4 Penn State		Los Angeles Memorial Coliseum; Los Angeles, CA	CBS	L 30–33 ^{OT}	75,250
October 19	1:00 p.m.	at Maryland		SECU Stadium; College Park, MD	FS1	L 28–29	43,013
October 25	8:00 p.m.	Rutgers		Los Angeles Memorial Coliseum; Los Angeles, CA	FOX/FS1	W 42–20	63,404
November 2	4:30 p.m.	at Washington		Husky Stadium; Seattle, WA	BTN	L 21–26	71,251
November 16	1:00 p.m.	Nebraska^{†}		Los Angeles Memorial Coliseum; Los Angeles, CA	FOX	W 28–20	75,304
November 23	7:30 p.m.	at UCLA		Rose Bowl Stadium; Pasadena, CA (Victory Bell)	NBC	W 19–13	59,473
November 30	12:30 p.m.	No. 5 Notre Dame*		Los Angeles Memorial Coliseum; Los Angeles, CA (Jeweled Shillelagh)	CBS	L 35–49	73,241
December 27	7:30 p.m.	vs. Texas A&M*		Allegiant Stadium; Paradise, NV (Las Vegas Bowl)	ESPN	W 35–31	26,671
*Non-conference game; ^{†}Homecoming; Rankings from AP Poll - Released prior to game; All times are in Pacific time

== Games summaries ==
=== vs. No. 13 LSU ===
Captains for week 1: Miller Moss, Kyron Hudson, Jonah Monheim, Easton Mascarenas-Arnold & Akili Arnold.

No. 13 LSU Tigers (0–0) vs No. 23 USC Trojans (0–0) – Game summary

Quarter	1	2	3	4	Total
No. 23 Trojans	0	10	3	14	27
No. 13 Tigers	0	10	7	3	20

at Allegiant Stadium • Paradise, NV

- Date: September 1, 2024
- Game time: 4:30 p.m. PDT
- Game weather: Indoor
- Game attendance: 63,969
- Referee: Kevin Mar
- TV announcers (ABC): Rece Davis (play-by-play), Kirk Herbstreit (analyst), and Holly Rowe (sideline reporter)

Game information

First quarter

- No Scoring

Second quarter

- (11:01) USC - Woody Marks 2-yard rush (Mark Lantz kick) (Drive: 8 plays, 87 yards, 3:49; USC 7–0)
- (7:08) LSU - Kyren Lacy 19-yard pass from Garrett Nussmeier (Damian Ramos kick) (Drive: 9 plays, 75 yards, 3:56; Tied 7–7)
- (4:21) USC - Michael Lantz 22-yard field goal (Drive: 6 plays, 38 yards, 2:35; USC 10–7)
- (1:08) LSU - Damian Ramos 45-yard field goal (Drive: 8 plays, 47 yards, 3:13; Tied 10–10)

Third quarter

- (7:13) USC - Michael Lantz 35-yard field goal (Drive: 9 plays, 59 yards, 4:14; USC 13–10)
- (3:42) LSU - Aaron Anderson 13-yard pass from Garrett Nussmeier (Damian Ramos kick) (Drive: 7 plays, 78 yards, 3:25; LSU 17–13)

Fourth quarter

- (5:44) USC - Ja'Kobi Lane 28-yard pass from Miller Moss (Michael Lantz kick) (Drive: 3 plays, 64 yards, 1:13; USC 20–17)
- (1:47) LSU - Damian Ramos 31-yard field goal (Drive: 9 plays, 61 yards, 3:57; Tied 20–20)
- (0:08) USC - Woody Marks 13-yard rush (Michael Lantz kick) (Drive: 8 plays, 75 yards, 1:39; USC 27–20)

Statistics	USC	LSU
First downs	24	21
Total yards	447	421
Rushes/yards	23–93	26–124
Passing yards	378	304
Passing: Comp–Att–Int	27–37–0	29–38–1
Time of possession	27:00	33:00

Team	Category	Player	Statistics
USC	Passing	Miller Moss	27/37, 378 yards, TD
USC	Rushing	Woody Marks	16 rushes, 68 yards, 2 TD
USC	Receiving	Kyron Hudson	5 receptions, 83 yards
LSU	Passing	Garrett Nussmeier	29/38, 304 yards, 2 TD, INT
LSU	Rushing	John Emery Jr.	10 rushes, 61 yards
LSU	Receiving	Kyren Lacy	7 receptions, 94 yards, TD

2024 Vegas Kickoff Classic
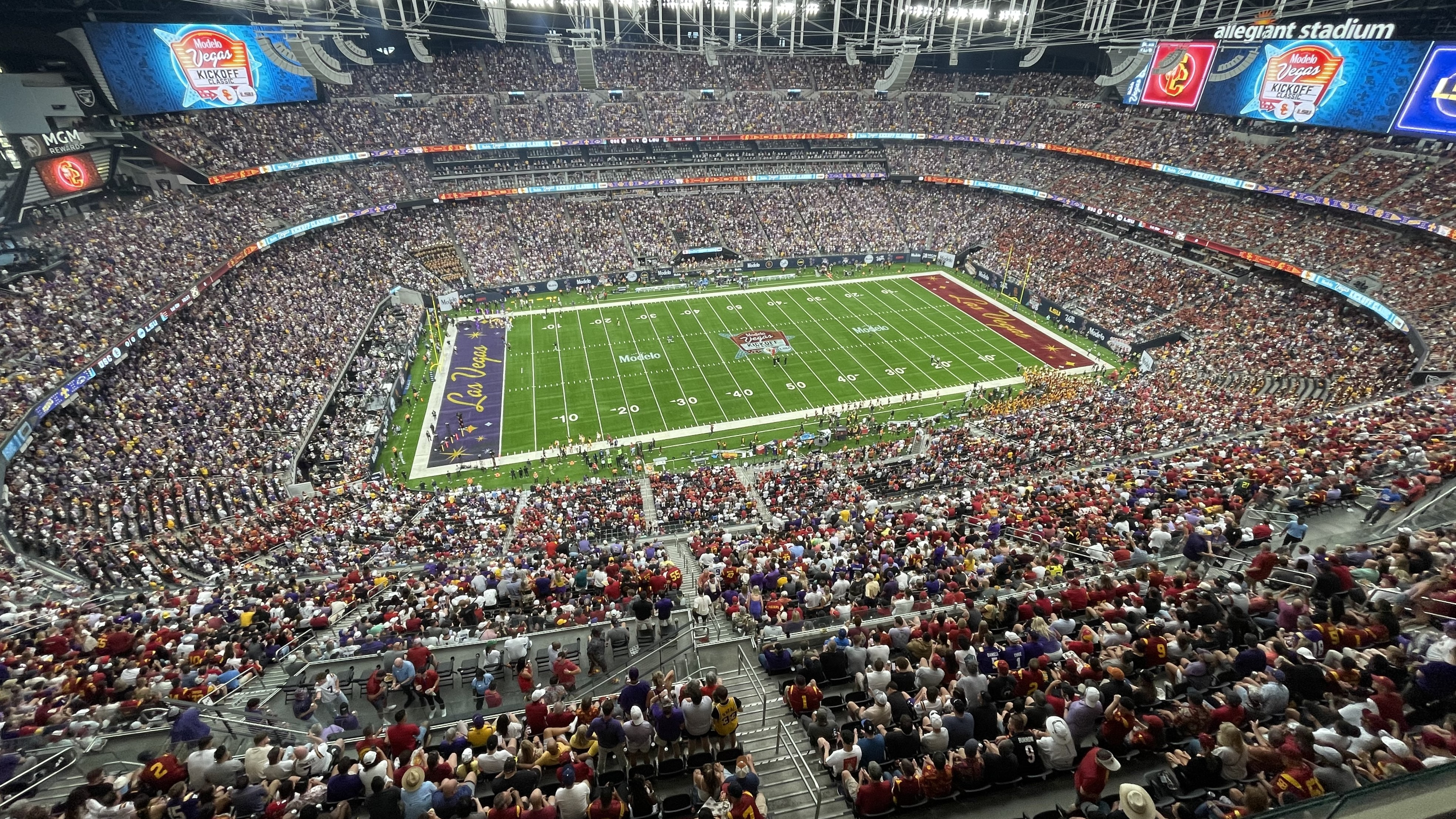
Press box view

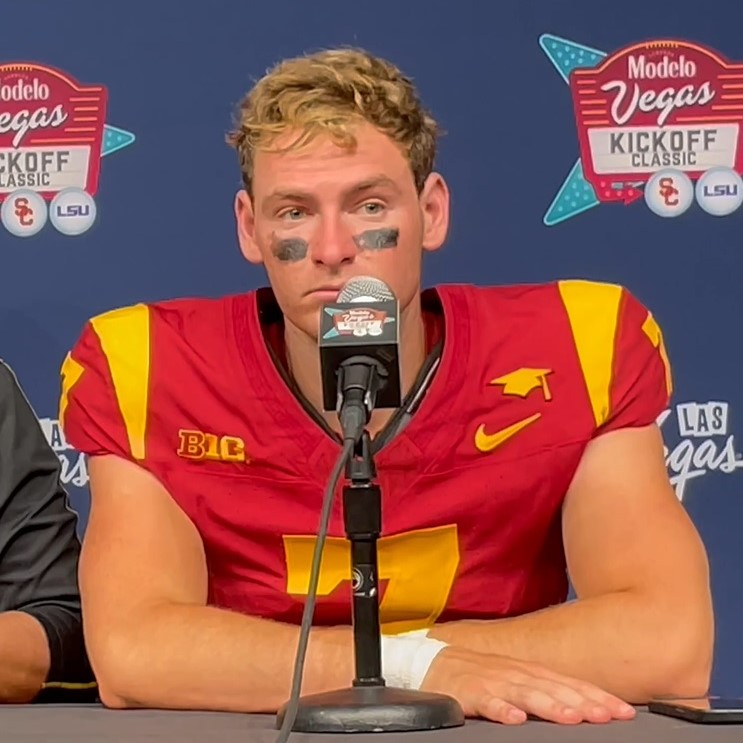
Passing leader Miller Moss

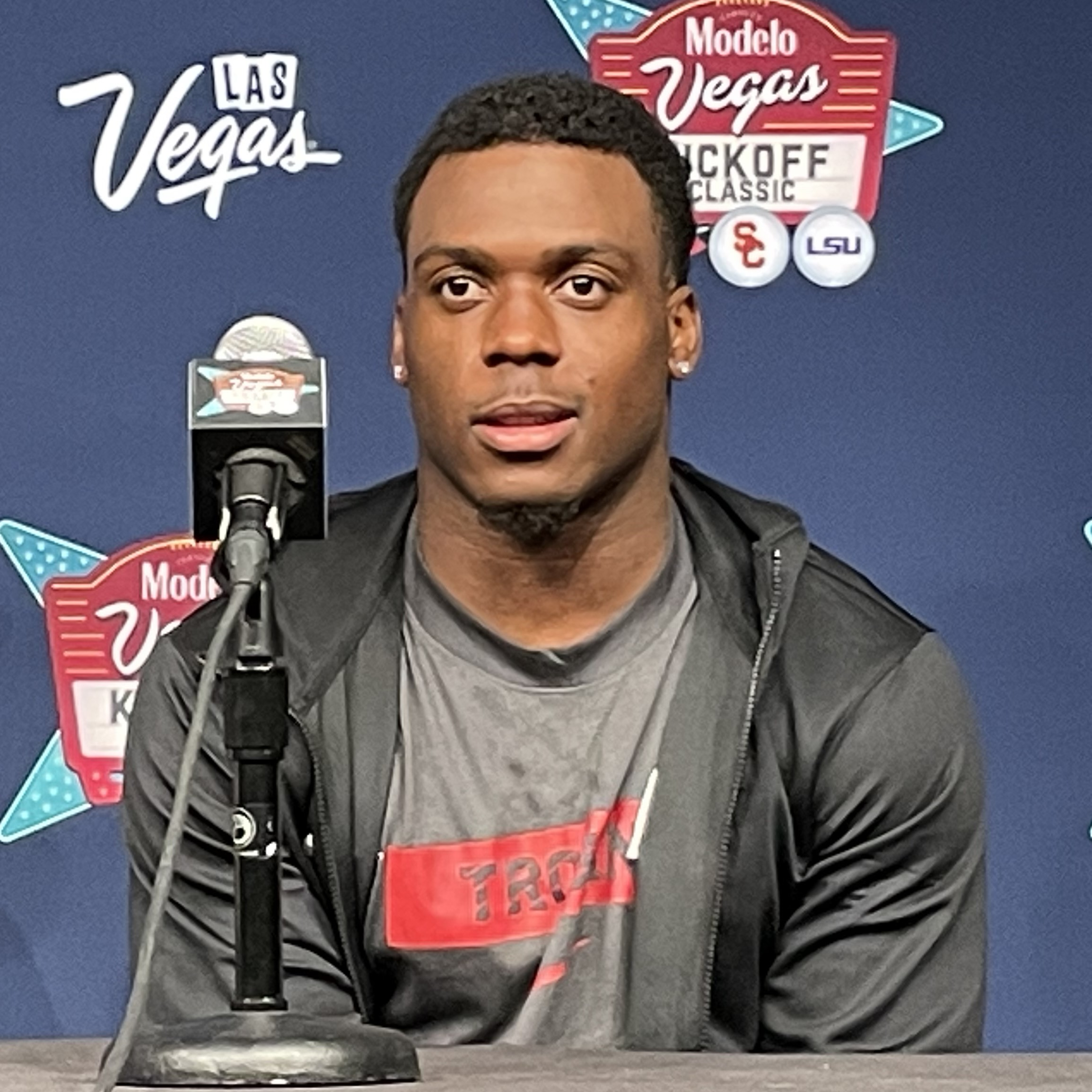
Rushing leader Woody Marks

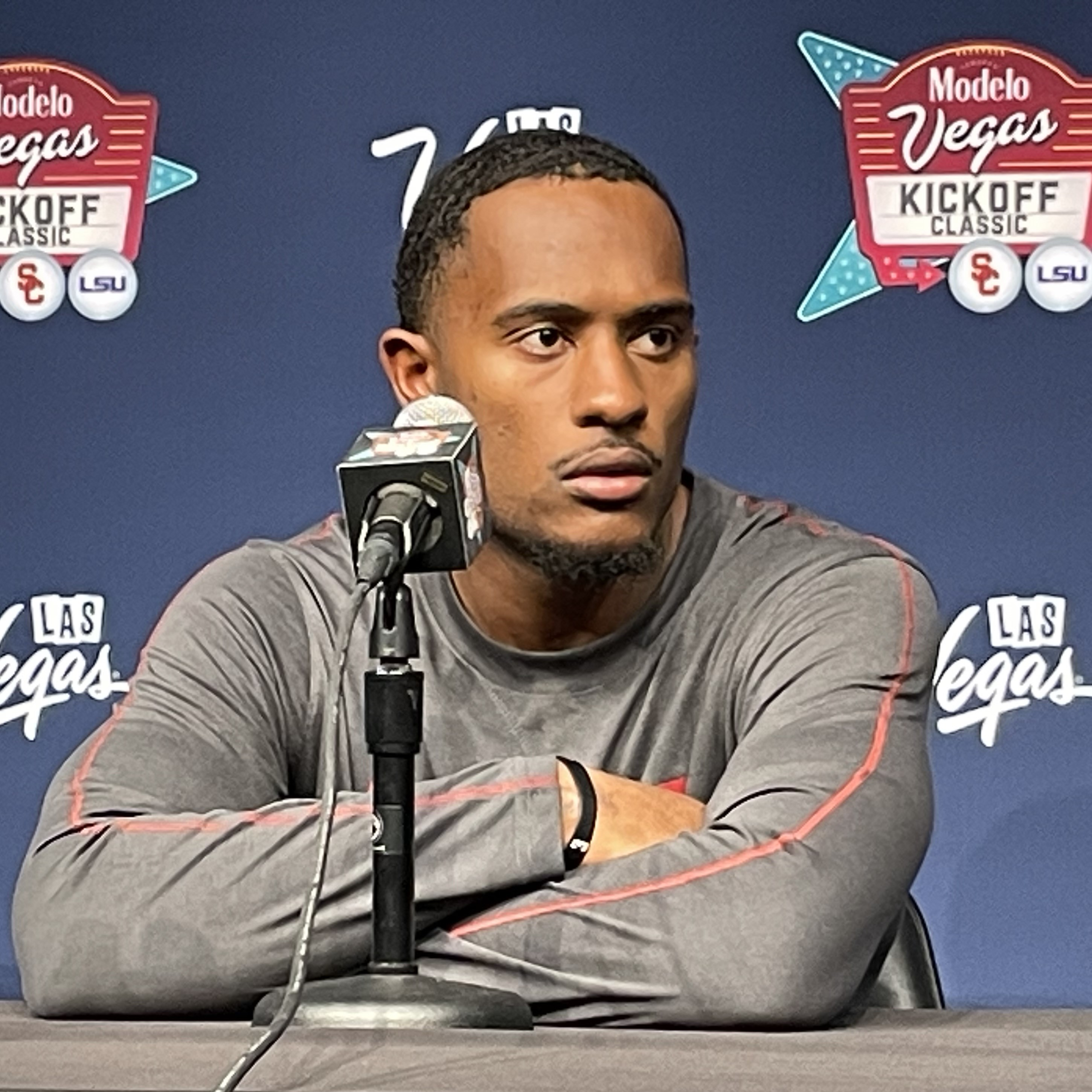
USC receiving leader Kyron Hudson

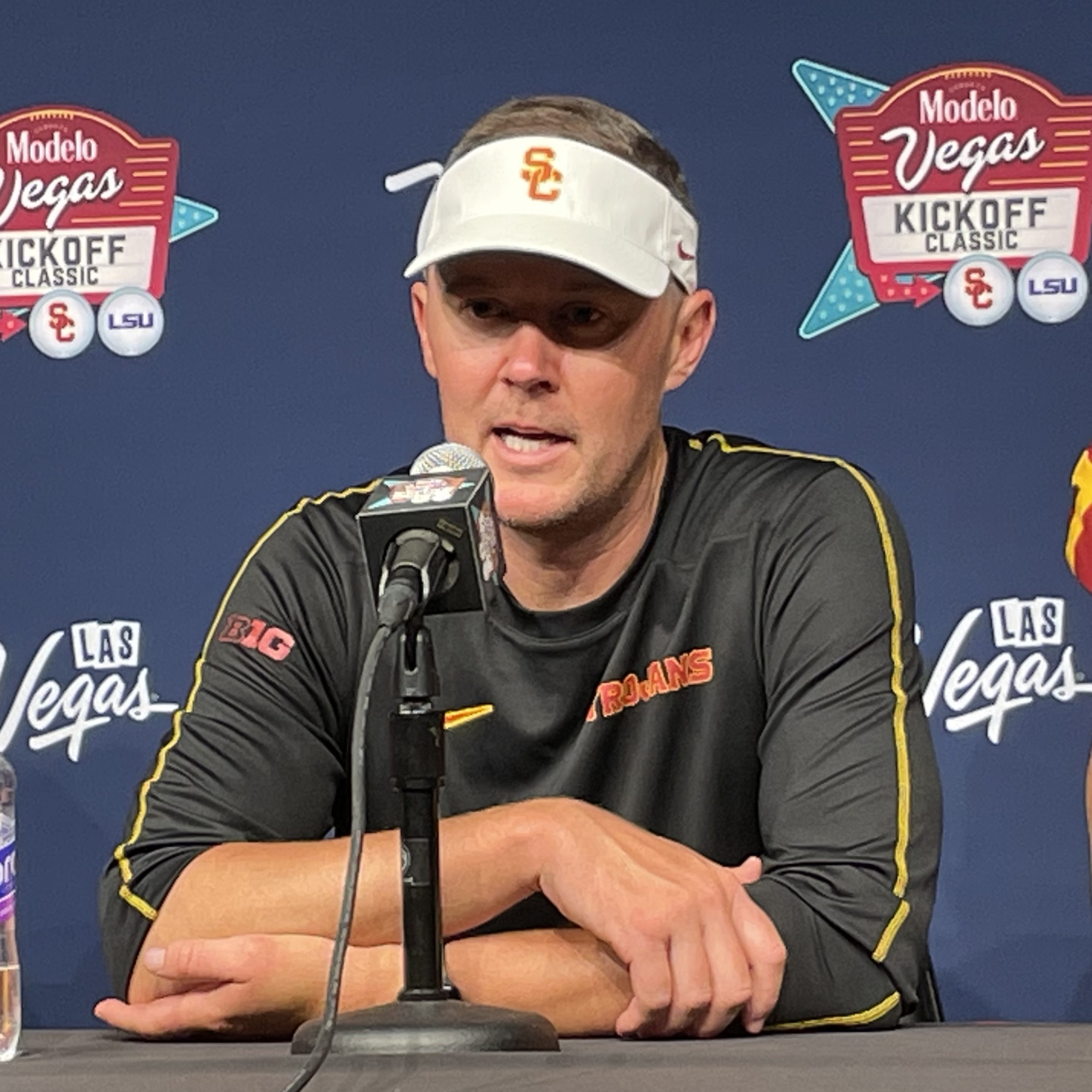
USC head coach Lincoln Riley
Photos all from game.

=== vs Utah State ===
Captains for week 2: Miller Moss, Lake McRee, Easton Mascarenas-Arnold & Kamari Ramsey.

Utah State Aggies (1–0) vs No. 13 USC Trojans (1–0) – Game summary

Quarter	1	2	3	4	Total
Aggies	0	0	0	0	0
No. 13 Trojans	10	17	7	14	48

at Los Angeles Memorial Coliseum • Los Angeles, CA

- Date: September 7, 2024
- Game time: 8:00 p.m. PDT
- Game weather: Clear and Sunny, 80 °F (27 °C)
- Game attendance: 68,110
- Referee: Tim O'Dey
- TV announcers (BTN): Guy Haberman (play-by-play), Yogi Roth (analyst), and Rhett Lewis (sideline reporter)

Game information

First quarter

- (11:13) USC - Michael Lantz 23-yard field goal (Drive: 9 plays, 77 yards, 3:43; USC 3–0)
- (4:22) USC - Quinten Joyner 9-yard rush (Michael Lantz kick) (Drive: 8 plays, 88 yards, 3:05; USC 10–0)

Second quarter

- (13:06) USC - Woody Marks 2-yard rush (Michael Lantz kick) (Drive: 11 plays, 77 yards, 4:36; USC 17–0)
- (1:41) USC - Michael Lantz 24-yard field goal (Drive: 11 plays, 54 yards, 4:49; USC 20–0)
- (0:04) USC - Makai Lemon 6-yard pass from Miller Moss (Michael Lantz kick) (Drive: 8 plays, 40 yards, 1:10; USC 27–0)

Third quarter

- (5:31) USC - Quinten Joyner 2-yard rush (Michael Lantz kick) (Drive: 11 plays, 56 yards, 5:40; USC 34–0)

Fourth quarter

- (14:15) USC - Jayden Maiava 7-yard rush (Michael Lantz kick) (Drive; 9 plays, 59 yards, 4:08; USC 41–0)
- (6:32) USC - A'Mario Peterson 9-yard rush (Michael Lantz kick) (Drive: 7 plays, 51 yards, 3:40; USC 48–0)

Statistics	USU	USC
First downs	10	28
Total yards	190	548
Rushes/yards	23/87	37/253
Passing yards	103	295
Passing: Comp–Att–Int	18–27–1	29–41–0
Time of possession	27:07	32:53

Team	Category	Player	Statistics
Utah State	Passing	Bryson Barnes	18/27, 103 yards, INT
Utah State	Rushing	Rahsul Faison	9 carries, 54 yards
Utah State	Receiving	Jalen Royals	6 receptions, 47 yards
USC	Passing	Miller Moss	21/30, 229 yards, TD
USC	Rushing	Woody Marks	13 carries, 103 yards, TD
USC	Receiving	Lake McRee	4 receptions, 81 yards

=== at No. 18 Michigan ===
Captains for week 4: Miller Moss, Kyron Hudson, Jonah Monheim, Easton Mascarenas-Arnold & Akili Arnold.

No. 11 USC Trojans (2–0) vs No. 18 Michigan Wolverines (2–1) – Game summary

Quarter	1	2	3	4	Total
No. 11 Trojans	0	3	14	7	24
No. 18 Wolverines	7	7	6	7	27

at Michigan Stadium • Ann Arbor, MI

- Date: September 21, 2024
- Game time: 12:30 p.m. PDT
- Game weather: Sunny, 83 °F (28 °C)
- Game attendance: 110,702
- Referee: Chris Coyte
- TV announcers (CBS): Brad Nessler (play-by-play), Gary Danielson (analyst), and Jenny Dell (sideline reporter)

Game information

First quarter

- (3:10) Michigan - Kalel Mullings 53-yard rush (Dominic Zvada kick) (Drive: 5 plays, 63 yards, 1:40; Michigan 7–0)

Second quarter

- (7:14) Michigan - Donovan Edwards 41-yard rush (Dominic Zvada kick) (Drive: 6 plays, 80 yards, 3:33; Michigan 14–0)
- (4:15) USC - Michael Lantz 29-yard field goal (Drive: 8 plays, 64 yards, 2:59; Michigan 14–3)

Third quarter

- (9:12) USC - Duce Robinson 9-yard pass from Miller Moss (Michael Lantz kick) (Drive: 12 plays, 75 yards, 5:50; Michigan 14–10)
- (5:31) Michigan - Will Johnson 42-yard interception return (Michigan 20–10)
- (1:28) USC - Jay Fair 16-yard pass from Miller Moss (Michael Lantz kick) (Drive: 2 plays, 27 yards, 0:57; Michigan 20–17)

Fourth quarter

- (7:01) USC - Ja'Kobi Lane 24-yard pass from Miller Moss (Michael Lantz kick) (Drive: 3 plays, 18 yards, 1:27; USC 24–20)
- (0:37) Michigan - Kalel Mullings 1-yard rush (Dominic Zvada kick) (Drive: 10 plays, 89 yards, 3:25; Michigan 27–24)

Statistics	USC	MICH
First downs	17	12
Total yards	379	322
Rushes/yards	21–96	46–290
Passing yards	283	32
Passing: Comp–Att–Int	28–52–1	7–12–0
Time of possession	30:42	29:18

Team	Category	Player	Statistics
USC	Passing	Miller Moss	28/51, 283 yards, 3 TD, INT
USC	Rushing	Woody Marks	13 carries, 100 yards
USC	Receiving	Zachariah Branch	6 receptions, 98 yards
Michigan	Passing	Alex Orji	7/12, 32 yards
Michigan	Rushing	Kalel Mullings	17 carries, 159 yards, 2 TD
Michigan	Receiving	Marlin Klein	1 reception, 10 yards

=== vs Wisconsin ===
Captains for week 5: Miller Moss, Woody Marks, Jamil Muhammad & Anthony Beavers Jr.

Wisconsin Badgers (2–1) vs No. 13 USC Trojans (2–1) – Game summary

Quarter	1	2	3	4	Total
Badgers	7	14	0	0	21
No. 13 Trojans	7	3	14	14	38

at Los Angeles Memorial Coliseum • Los Angeles, CA

- Date: September 28, 2024
- Game time: 12:30 p.m. PDT
- Game weather: Sunny, 78 °F (26 °C)
- Game attendance: 74,118
- Referee: Larry Smith
- TV announcers (CBS): Brad Nessler (play-by-play), Gary Danielson (analyst), and Jenny Dell (sideline reporter)

Game information

First quarter

- (12:23) USC – Ja'Kobi Lane 32-yard pass from Miller Moss, Michael Lantz kick (Drive: 6 plays, 75 yards, 2:37; USC 7–0)
- (10:52) WIS – Vinny Anthony II 63-yard pass from Braedyn Locke, Nathanial Vakos kick (Drive: 4 plays, 75 yards, 1:31; Tied 7–7)

Second quarter

- (14:44) WIS – Tawee Walker 18-yard rush, Nathanial Vakos kick (Drive: 1 play, 18 yards, 0:06; WIS 14–7)
- (9:43) USC – Michael Lantz 41-yard field goal (Drive: 8 plays, 41 yards 5:01; WIS 14–10)
- (6:29) WIS – Tawee Walker 4-yard rush, Nathanial Vakos kick (Drive: 7 plays, 75 yards, 3:14; WIS 21–10)

Third quarter

- (9:18) USC – Ja'Kobi Lane 6-yard pass from Miller Moss, Michael Lantz kick (Drive: 9 plays, 30 yards, 3:33; WIS 21–17)
- (1:28) USC – Duce Robinson 8-yard pass from Miller Moss, Michael Lantz kick (Drive: 9 plays, 67 yards 4:16; USC 24–21)

Fourth quarter

- (8:22) USC – Miller Moss 7-yard rush, Michael Lantz kick (Drive: 10 plays, 77 yards, 6:29; USC 31–21)
- (5:10) USC – Mason Cobb 55-yard interception return, Michael Lantz kick (Drive: 2 plays, 2 yards, 0:33; USC 38–21)

Statistics	WIS	USC
First downs	13	29
Total yards	286	469
Rushes/yards	25/106	37/161
Passing yards	108	308
Passing: Comp–Att–Int	13–26–1	30–45–1
Time of possession	19:53	40:07

Team	Category	Player	Statistics
Wisconsin	Passing	Braedyn Locke	13/26, 180 yards, TD, INT
Wisconsin	Rushing	Tawee Walker	12 carries, 55 yards 2 TD
Wisconsin	Receiving	Vinny Anthony II	3 receptions, 70 yards, TD
USC	Passing	Miller Moss	30/45, 308 yards, 3 TD, INT
USC	Rushing	Woody Marks	19 carries, 63 yards
USC	Receiving	Ja'Kobi Lane	10 receptions, 105 yards, 2 TD

=== at Minnesota ===
Captains for week 6: Miller Moss, Gavin Meyer, Mason Cobb & Eddie Czaplicki.

No. 11 USC Trojans (3–1) vs Minnesota Golden Gophers (2–3) – Game summary

Quarter	1	2	3	4	Total
No. 11 Trojans	0	10	7	0	17
Golden Gophers	3	7	0	14	24

at Huntington Bank Stadium • Minneapolis, MN

- Date: October 5, 2024
- Game time: 4:30 p.m. PDT
- Game weather: Sunny, 71 °F (22 °C)
- Game attendance: 50,913
- Referee: Ron Snodgrass
- TV announcers (BTN): Guy Haberman (play-by-play), Yogi Roth (analyst), and Rhett Lewis (sideline reporter)

Game information

First quarter

- (0:05) MINN - Dragan Kesich 32-yard field goal, (Drive: 9 plays, 49 yards, 5:19; Minnesota 3–0)

Second quarter

- (7:13) USC - Duce Robinson 3-yard pass from Miller Moss (Michael Lantz kick) (Drive: 15 plays, 75 yards, 7:52; USC 7–3)
- (4:05) MINN - Max Brosmer 1-yard rush (Dragan Kesich kick) (Drive: 7 plays, 75 yards, 3:08; Minnesota 10–7)
- (0:00) USC - Michael Lantz 54-yard field goal (Drive: 4 plays, 16 yards, 0:27Tied 10–10)

Third quarter

- (5:47) USC - Woody Marks 1-yard rush (Michael Lantz kick) (Drive: 12 plays, 91 yards, 7:03; USC 17–10)

Fourth quarter

- (7:08) MINN - Max Brosmer 5-yard rush (Dragan Kesich kick) (Drive: 6 plays, 65 yards, 3:03; Tied 17–17)
- (0:56) MINN - Max Brosmer 1-yard rush (Dragan Kesich kick) (Drive: 12 plays, 75 yards, 5:13; Minnesota 24–17)

Statistics	USC	MINN
First downs	22	20
Total yards	373	362
Rushes/yards	28/173	40/193
Passing yards	200	169
Passing: Comp–Att–Int	22–38–2	15–19–0
Time of possession	31:48	31:00

Team	Category	Player	Statistics
USC	Passing	Miller Moss	23/38, 200 yards, TD, 2 INT
USC	Rushing	Woody Marks	20 carries, 134 yards, TD
USC	Receiving	Kyron Hudson	5 receptions, 54 yards
Minnesota	Passing	Max Brosmer	15/19, 169 yards
Minnesota	Rushing	Darius Taylor	25 carries, 144 yards
Minnesota	Receiving	Darius Taylor	5 receptions, 56 yards

=== vs No. 4 Penn State ===
Captains for week 7 : Miller Moss, Jonah Monheim, Easton Mascarenas-Arnold & Akili Arnold.

No. 4 Penn State Nittany Lions (5–0) vs USC Trojans (3–2) – Game summary

Quarter	1	2	3	4	OT	Total
No. 4 Nittany Lions	3	3	14	10	3	33
Trojans	7	13	3	7	0	30

at Los Angeles Memorial Coliseum • Los Angeles, CA

- Date: October 12, 2024
- Game time: 12:30 p.m. PDT
- Game weather: Sunny, 78 °F (26 °C)
- Game attendance: 75,250
- Referee: Jerry McGinn
- TV announcers (CBS): Brad Nessler (play-by-play), Gary Danielson (analyst), and Jenny Dell (sideline reporter)

Game information

First quarter

- (4:53) PSU - Ryan Barker 34-yard field goal (Drive: 14 plays, 72 yards, 7:57; Penn State 3–0)
- (4:38) USC - Quinten Joyner 75-yard run (Michael Lantz kick) (Drive: 1 play, 75 yards, 0:15; USC 7–3)

Second quarter

- (13:33) USC - Quinten Joyner 9-yard pass from Miller Moss (Michael Lantz kick) (Drive: 7 plays, 89 yards, 3:16; USC 14–3)
- (10:05) USC - Michael Lantz 45-yard field goal (Drive: 4 plays, -2 yards, 2:10; USC 17–3)
- (2:46) PSU - Ryan Barker 33-yard field goal (Drive: 10 plays, 64 yards, 3:12; USC 17–6)
- (0:07) USC - Michael Lantz 47-yard field goal (Drive: 7 plays, 49 yards, 2:35; USC 20–6)

Third quarter

- (12:52) PSU - Tyler Warren 32-yard pass from Drew Allar (Ryan Barker kick) (Drive: 5 plays, 75 yards, 2:08; USC 20–13)
- (4:48) PSU - Kaytron Allen 1-yard rush (Ryan Barker kick) (Drive: 8 plays, 90 yards, 4:34; Tied 20–20)
- (0:28) USC - Michael Lantz 39-yard field goal (Drive: 4 plays, 2 yards, 0:59; USC 23–20)

Fourth quarter

- (10:50) PSU - Ryan Barker 20-yard field goal ( Drive: 9 plays, 72 yards, 4:39; Tied 23–23)
- (5:56) USC - Kyron Hudson 5-yard pass from Miller Moss (Michael Lantz kick) (Drive: 9 plays, 75 yards, 4:54; USC 30–23)
- (2:53) PSU - Nicholas Singleton 14-yard pass from Drew Allar (Ryan Barker kick) (Drive: 12 plays, 75 yards, 3:03; Tied 30–30)

First Overtime

- PSU - Ryan Barker 36-yard field goal (Drive: 4 plays, 6 yards; PSU 33–30)

Statistics	PSU	USC
First downs	28	16
Total yards	518	409
Rushes/yards	31/118	24/189
Passing yards	400	220
Passing: Comp–Att–Int	31–44–3	20–34–1
Time of possession	32:24	27:36

Team	Category	Player	Statistics
Penn State	Passing	Drew Allar	30/43, 391 yards, 2 TD, 3 INT
Penn State	Rushing	Kaytron Allen	16 carries, 56 yards, 1 TD
Penn State	Receiving	Tyler Warren	17 receptions, 224 yards, 1 TD
USC	Passing	Miller Moss	20/34, 220 yards, 2 TD, 1 INT
USC	Rushing	Woody Marks	20 carries, 111 yards
USC	Receiving	Makai Lemon	6 receptions, 73 yards

=== at Maryland ===
Captains for week 8: Kyle Ford, Emmanuel Pregnon, Jaylin Smith & Bryson Shaw.

USC Trojans (3–3) vs Maryland Terrapins (3–3) – Game summary

Quarter	1	2	3	4	Total
Trojans	7	14	0	7	28
Terrapins	0	7	7	15	29

at SECU Stadium • College Park, MD

- Date: October 19, 2024
- Game time: 1:00 p.m. PDT
- Game weather: Sunny, 72 °F (22 °C)
- Game attendance: 43,013
- Referee: Jeffrey Sevinski
- TV announcers (FS1): Eric Collins (play-by-play) and Robert Smith (analyst)

Game information

First quarter

- (0:00) USC - Kyron Hudson 22-yard pass from Miller Moss (Michael Lantz kick) (Drive: 8 plays, 79 yards, 3:25; USC 7-0)

Second quarter

- (11:07) Maryland - Billy Edwards Jr. 16-yard pass from Octavian Smith Jr. (Jack Howes kick) (Drive: 8 plays, 75 yards, 3:53; Tied 7-7)
- (8:08) USC - Ja'Kobi Lane 15-yard pass from Miller Moss (Michael Lantz kick) (Drive: 7 plays, 75 yards, 2:59; USC 14-7)
- (0:21) USC - Woody Marks 5-yard rush (Michael Lantz kick) (Drive: 4 plays, 41 yards, 0:48; USC 21-7)

Third quarter

- (8:32) Maryland - Tai Felton 18-yard pass from Billy Edwards Jr. (Jack Howes kick) (Drive: 1 play, 18 yards, 0:07; USC 21-14)

Fourth quarter

- (13:31) USC - Duce Robinson 26-yard pass from Miller Moss (Michael Lantz kick) (Drive: 10 plays, 80 yards, 4:20; USC 28-14)
- (10:02) Maryland - Roman Hemby 10-yard rush (Kaden Prather 2-point conversion pass from Billy Edward Jr.) (Drive: 10 plays, 75 yards, 3:29; USC 28-22)
- (0:53) Maryland - Billy Edwards Jr. 3-yard rush (Jack Howes kick) (Drive: 5 plays, 47 yards, 0:48; Maryland 29-28)

Statistics	USC	MD
First downs	24	25
Total yards	417	429
Rushes/yards	24/81	24/56
Passing yards	336	373
Passing: Comp–Att–Int	34–50–1	39–51–1
Time of possession	29:51	30:09

Team	Category	Player	Statistics
USC	Passing	Miller Moss	34/50, 336 yards, 3 TD, 1 INT
USC	Rushing	Woody Marks	17 carries, 82 yards, 1 TD
USC	Receiving	Makai Lemon	8 receptions, 89 yards
Maryland	Passing	Billy Edwards Jr.	39/50, 373 yards, 2 TD, 1 INT
Maryland	Rushing	Nolan Ray	6 carries, 54 yards
Maryland	Receiving	Kaden Prather	9 receptions, 111 yards

=== vs Rutgers ===
Captains for week 9: Lake McRee, Jonah Monheim, DeCarlos Nicholson & Akili Arnold.

Rutgers Scarlet Knights (4–3) vs USC Trojans (3–4) – Game summary

Quarter	1	2	3	4	Total
Scarlet Knights	3	9	8	0	20
Trojans	14	14	14	0	42

at Los Angeles Memorial Coliseum • Los Angeles, CA

- Date: October 25, 2024
- Game time: 8:00 p.m. PDT
- Game weather: Clear, 64 °F (18 °C)
- Game attendance: 63,404
- Referee: Gregory Blum
- TV announcers (FOX/FS1): Jason Benetti (play-by-play), Brock Huard (analyst) and Allison Williams (sideline)

Game information

First quarter

Second quarter

Third quarter

Fourth quarter

Statistics	RUTG	USC
First downs		
Total yards		
Rushes/yards		
Passing yards		
Passing: Comp–Att–Int		
Time of possession		

Team	Category	Player	Statistics
Rutgers	Passing		
Rutgers	Rushing		
Rutgers	Receiving		
USC	Passing		
USC	Rushing		
USC	Receiving		

=== at Washington ===
Captains for week 10: Miller Moss, Emmanuel Pregnon, Devan Thompkins & Mason Cobb.

USC Trojans (4–4) vs Washington Huskies (4–4) – Game summary

Quarter	1	2	3	4	Total
Trojans	0	7	14	0	21
Huskies	10	10	0	6	26

at Husky Stadium • Seattle, WA

- Date: November 2, 2024
- Game time: 4:30 p.m. PDT
- Game weather: Cloudy
- Game attendance: 71,251
- Referee: Tim O'Dey
- TV announcers (BTN): Jeff Levering (play-by-play), Jake Butt (analyst), and Brooke Fletcher (sideline)

Game information

First quarter
Second quarter
Third quarter
Fourth quarter

Statistics	USC	WASH
First downs		
Total yards		
Rushes/yards		
Passing yards		
Passing: Comp–Att–Int		
Time of possession		

Team	Category	Player	Statistics
USC	Passing		
USC	Rushing		
USC	Receiving		
Washington	Passing		
Washington	Rushing		
Washington	Receiving		

=== vs Nebraska ===
Captains for week 12: Zachariah Branch, Jonah Monheim, Gavin Meyer & Jaylin Smith.

Nebraska Cornhuskers (5-4) vs USC Trojans (4-5) – Game summary

Quarter	1	2	3	4	Total
Cornhuskers	7	7	6	0	20
Trojans	7	7	7	7	28

at Los Angeles Memorial Coliseum • Los Angeles, CA

- Date: November 16, 2024
- Game time: 1:00 p.m. PST
- Game weather: Sunny, 66 degrees, Wind NW @ 3 mph
- Game attendance: 75,304
- Referee: Kole Knueppel
- TV announcers (FOX): Jason Benetti (play-by-play), Brock Huard (analyst), and Allison Williams (sideline)

Game information

First quarter

- (9:37) NEB – Ceyair Wright 45-yard interception return, John Hohl kick (Drive: Nebraska 7-0)
- (5:04) USC - Zachariah Branch 6-yard pass from Jayden Maiava, Michael Lantz kick (Drive: 9 plays, 65 yards, 4:25, 7-7)

Second quarter

- (13:05) USC - Kyron Hudson 12-yard pass from Jayden Maiava, Michael Lantz kick (Drive: 8 plays, 86 yards, 4:01, USC 14-7)
- (9:21) NEB - Emmett Johnson 29-yard pass from Dylan Raiola, John Hohl kick (Drive: 9 plays, 75 yards, 3:44, 14-14)

Third quarter

- (9:37) NEB - John Hohl 29-yard field goal (Drive: 11 plays, 64 yards, 5:23, Nebraska 17-14)
- (7:15) USC - Duce Robinson 48-yard pass from Jayden Maiava, Michael Lantz kick (Drive: 5 plays, 75 yards, 2:22, USC 21-17)
- (2:09) NEB - John Hohl 30-yard field goal (Drive: 4 plays, 4 yards, 2:01 USC 21-20)

Fourth quarter

- (2:45) USC - Jayden Maiava 2-yard rush, Michael Lantz kick (Drive: 13 plays, 84 yards, 7:39, USC 28-20)

Statistics	NEB	USC
First downs	19	22
Total yards	310	441
Rushes/yards	25–119	32–182
Passing yards	191	259
Passing: Comp–Att–Int	27–38–2	25–35–1
Time of possession	28:10	31:50

Team	Category	Player	Statistics
Nebraska	Passing	Dylan Raiola	27/38, 191 yards, TD, 2 INT
Nebraska	Rushing	Emmett Johnson	10 carries, 55 yards
Nebraska	Receiving	Jahmal Banks	5 receptions, 55 yards
USC	Passing	Jayden Maiava	25/35, 259 yards, 3 TD, INT
USC	Rushing	Woody Marks	19 carries, 146 yards
USC	Receiving	Duce Robinson	4 receptions, 90 yards, TD

=== at UCLA (Victory Bell) ===
Captains for week 13: Emmanuel Pregnon, Jonah Monheim, Gavin Meyer, Jaylin Smith & Eddie Czaplicki.

USC Trojans (5–5) vs UCLA Bruins (4–6) – Game summary

Quarter	1	2	3	4	Total
Trojans	3	6	0	10	19
Bruins	3	0	10	0	13

at Rose Bowl Stadium • Pasadena, CA

- Date: November 23, 2024
- Game time: 7:30 p.m. PST
- Game weather: Cloudy, 56 °F (13 °C)
- Game attendance: 59,473
- Referee: Mark Kluczynski
- TV announcers (NBC): Paul Burmeister (play-by-play), Colt McCoy (analyst), and Lewis Johnson (sideline)

Game information

First quarter

- (11:32) UCLA - Mateen Bhaghani 51-yard field goal (Drive: 7 plays, 42 yards, 3:28; UCLA 3-0)
- (4:12) USC - Michael Lantz 19-yard field goal (Drive: 9 plays, 93 yards, 3:02; Tied 3-3)

Second quarter

- (9:25) USC - Michael Lantz 23-yard field goal (Drive: 12 plays 51 yards, 4:52; USC 6-3)
- (0:21) USC - Michael Lantz 22-yard field goal (Drive: 14 plays, 54 yards, 4:21; USC 9-3)

Third quarter

- (9:37) UCLA - Miliki Matavao 10-yard pass from Ethan Garbers (Mateen Bhaghani kick) (Drive: 7 plays, 54 yards, 4:21; UCLA 10-9)
- (0:04) UCLA - Mateen Bhaghani 29-yard field goal (Drive: 10 plays, 80 yards, 7:01; UCLA 13-9)

Fourth quarter

- (6:55) USC - Ja'Kobi Lane 4-yard pass from Jayden Maiava (Michael Lantz kick) (Drive: 3 plays, 49 yards, 1:21; USC 16-13)
- (2:09) USC - Michael Lantz 30-yard field goal (Drive: 8 plays, 21 yards, 2:50; USC 19-13)

Statistics	USC	UCLA
First downs	17	16
Total yards	346	376
Rushes/yards	29–86	26–111
Passing yards	260	265
Passing: Comp–Att–Int	20–36–0	20–29–0
Time of possession	29:03	30:57

Team	Category	Player	Statistics
USC	Passing	Jayden Maiava	19/35, 221 yards, TD
USC	Rushing	Woody Marks	18 carries, 76 yards
USC	Receiving	Kyron Hudson	6 receptions, 79 yards
UCLA	Passing	Ethan Garbers	20/29, 265 yards, TD
UCLA	Rushing	T. J. Harden	14 carries, 99 yards
UCLA	Receiving	J. Michael Sturdivant	5 receptions, 117 yards

=== vs No. 5 Notre Dame (rivalry) ===
Captains for week 14: RB Woody Marks, OL Jonah Monheim, DB Jaylin Smith, S Bryson Shaw & P Eddie Czaplicki.

No. 5 Notre Dame Fighting Irish (10–1) vs USC Trojans (6–5) – Game summary

Quarter	1	2	3	4	Total
No. 5 Fighting Irish	7	7	21	14	49
Trojans	0	14	7	14	35

at Los Angeles Memorial Coliseum • Los Angeles, CA

- Date: November 30, 2024
- Game time: 12:30 p.m. PST
- Game weather: Cloudy,
- Game attendance: 73,241
- Referee: Ron Snodgrass
- TV announcers (CBS): Brad Nessler (play-by-play), Gary Danielson (analyst), and Jenny Dell (sideline reporter)

Game information

First quarter

- (2:28) ND – Jeremiyah Love 1-yard run, Mitch Jeter kick (Drive: 13 plays, 72 yards, 7:14; Notre Dame 7–0)

Second quarter

- (12:07) USC – Jayden Maiava 1-yard run, Michael Lantz kick (Drive: 5 plays, 37 yards, 2:47; Tied 7–7)
- (0:59) ND – Eli Raridon 12-yard pass from Riley Leonard, Mitch Jeter kick (Drive: 7 plays, 65 yards, 2:27; Notre Dame 14–7)
- (0:24) USC – Ja'Kobi Lane 12-yard pass from Jayden Maiava, Michael Lanz kick (Drive: 5 plays, 78 yards, 0:31; Tied 14–14)

Third quarter

- (12:38) ND – Jadarian Price 36-yard run, Mitch Jeter kick (Drive: 6 plays, 75 yards, 2:22; Notre Dame 21–14)
- (9:06) USC – Jayden Maiava 1-yard run, Michael Lantz kick (Drive: 8 plays, 77 yards, 3:27; Tied 21–21)
- (6:27) ND – Riley Leonard 2-yard run, Mitch Jeter (Drive: 6 plays, 75 yards, 1:06; Notre Dame 28–14)
- (1:11) ND – Mitchell Evans 23-yard pass from Riley Leonard, Mitch Jeter kick (Drive: 3 plays, 62 yards, 1:06; Notre Dame 35–21)

Fourth quarter

- (8:43) USC – Ja'Kobi Lane 6-yard pass from Jayden Maiava, Michael Lantz kick (Drive: 5 plays, 45 yards, 3:09; Notre Dame 35–28)
- (3:39) ND – Christian Gray 99-yard interception return, Mitch Jeter kick (Drive: 6 plays, 63 yards, 2:21; Notre Dame 42–28)
- (1:18) ND – Xavier Watts 100-yard interception return, Mitch Jeter kick (Drive: 8 plays, 62 yards, 2:21; Notre Dame 49–28)
- (0:13) USC – Ja'Kobi Lane 8-yard pass from Jayden Maiava, Michael Lantz kick (Drive: 5 plays, 75 yards, 1:05; Notre Dame 49–35)

Statistics	ND	USC
First downs	23	29
Total yards	61–436	77–557
Rushes/yards	38–258	28–197
Passing yards	178	360
Passing: Comp–Att–Int	18–23–1	27–49–2
Time of possession	29:45	30:15

Team	Category	Player	Statistics
Notre Dame	Passing	Riley Leonard	17/22, 155 yards, 2 TD, INT
Notre Dame	Rushing	Jadarian Price	12 carries, 111 yards, TD
Notre Dame	Receiving	Mitchell Evans	5 receptions, 59 yards, TD
USC	Passing	Jayden Maiava	27/49, 360 yards, 3 TD, 2 INT
USC	Rushing	Quinten Joyner	10 carries, 83 yards
USC	Receiving	Makai Lemon	9 receptions, 133 yards

=== vs Texas A&M (Las Vegas Bowl) ===
Captains for the bowl game: Jayden Maiava, Kyle Ford, Kilian O’Connor, Devan Thompkins & Easton Mascarenas-Arnold.

2024 SRS Distribution Las Vegas Bowl
USC Trojans (6–6) vs Texas A&M Aggies (8–4) – Game summary

Quarter	1	2	3	4	Total
Trojans	0	7	7	21	35
Aggies	7	0	17	7	31

at Allegiant Stadium • Paradise, NV

- Date: Friday, December 27, 2024
- Game time: 7:30 p.m. PST
- Game weather: Indoor
- Game attendance: 26,671
- Referee: Marcus Woods
- TV announcers (ESPN/ESPN Radio): Dave Flemming (play-by-play), Brock Osweiler (analyst), and Stormy Buonantony (sideline)/Roxy Bernstein (play-by-play) and Jordan Reid (analyst)

Game information
1st Quarter
- (6:40) TAMU - Noah Thomas 7-yard pass from Marcel Reed (Randy Reed kick) (Drive: 16 plays, 78 yards, 7:07; Texas A&M 7-0)

2nd Quarter

- (10:16) USC - Ja'Kobi Lane 30-yard pass from Jayden Maiava (Michael Lantz kick) (Drive: 8 plays, 74 yards, 3:36; Tied: 7-7)

3rd Quarter

- (11:03) TAMU - Noah Thomas 5-yard pass from Marcel Redd (Randy Reed kick) (Drive: 8 plays, 76 yards, 3:51; Texas A&M 14-7)
- (6:12) TAMU - Randy Bond 27-yard field goal (Drive: 8 plays, 74 yards, 3:55; Texas A&M 17-7)
- (5:12) TAMU - Jabre Barber 5-yard pass from Marcel Redd (Randy Bond kick) (Drive: 3 plays, 9 yards, 0:43; Texas A&M 24-7)
- (3:42) USC - Ja'Kobi Lane 17-yard pass from Jayden Maiava (Michael Lantz kick) (Drive: 3 plays, 71 yards, 1:26; Texas A&M 24-14)

4th Quarter

- (14:24) USC - Bryan Jackson 1-yard rush (Michael Lantz kick) (Drive: 8 plays, 66 yards, 2:51; Texas A&M 24-21)
- (4:30) USC - Ja'Kobi Lane 15-yard pass from Jaden Maiava (Michael Lantz kick) (Drive: 10 plays, 79 yards, 5:32; USC 28-24)
- (1:49) TAMU - Marcel Reed 19-yard rush (Randy Bond kick) (Drive: 7 plays, 75 yards, 2:41; Texas A&M 31-28)
- (0:08) USC - Kyle Ford 7-yard pass from Jayden Maiava (Michael Lantz kick) (Drive: 10 plays, 75 yards, 1:41; USC 35-31)

Statistics	USC	TAMU
First downs	25	24
Total yards	400	443
Rushing yards	105	151
Passing yards	295	292
Passing: Comp–Att–Int	22–39–3	26–42–2
Time of possession	28:07	31:53

Team	Category	Player	Statistics
USC	Passing	Jayden Maiava	22/39, 295 yards, 4 TD, 3 INT
USC	Rushing	Bryan Jackson	16 carries, 66 yards, TD
USC	Receiving	Ja'Kobi Lane	7 receptions, 127 yards, 3 TD
Texas A&M	Passing	Marcel Reed	26/42, 292 yards, 3 TD, 2 INT
Texas A&M	Rushing	Rueben Owens	13 carries, 56 yards
Texas A&M	Receiving	Jabre Barber	7 receptions, 48 yards, TD

== Personnel ==
=== Roster and coaching staff ===
2024 USC Trojans football team roster
Players
Coaches
Offense

Pos.	#	Name	Class
RB	0	Quinten Joyner	Fr
WR	1	Zachariah Branch	So
WR	2	Duce Robinson	So
RB	4	Woody Marks	Sr
WR	6	Makai Lemon	So
QB	7	Miller Moss	Jr
WR	8	Ja'Kobi Lane	So
WR	9	Jay Fair	Jr
WR	10	Kyron Hudson	Jr
QB	14	Jayden Maiava	So
WR	15	Jaden Richardson	Sr
QB	17	Jake Jensen	Jr
TE	18	Joey Olsen	Fr
WR	19	Xavier Jordan	Fr
RB	21	Bryan Jackson	Fr
RB	22	A'Marion Peterson	Fr
TE	23	Walter Matthews	Fr
TE	24	Carson Tabaracci	So
QB	27	Dylan Gebbia	Fr
QB	28	Gage Roy	Jr
QB	29	Jack Stupin	Fr
RB	30	King Miller	Fr
RB	39	Cian McKelvey	So
WR	44	Josiah Zamora	Jr
WR	46	Corey Nerhus	Sr
OL	58	Kalolo Ta'aga	Fr
OL	59	Micah Bañuelos	Fr
OL	60	Kaylon Miller	Fr
OL	61	Jack Susnjar	Fr
OL	62	Travis Leonard	Fr
OL	65	Erwin Taomi	So
OL	66	Gino Quinones	Sr
OL	67	Kilian O'Connor	Jr
OL	68	Hayden Treter	Fr
OL	70	Emmanuel Pregnon	Sr
OL	72	Elijah Paige	Fr
OL	73	Tobias Raymond	Fr
OL	74	Justin Tauanuu	Fr
OL	75	Amos Talalele	Fr
OL	76	Mason Murphy	Jr
OL	77	Alani Noa	So
OL	78	Makai Saina	Fr
OL	79	Jonah Monheim	Sr
WR	81	Kyle Ford	Sr
WR	82	Seth Zamora	Fr
WR	83	Donovan Wood	Sr
WR	84	Charles Ross	Sr
TE	85	Walker Lyons	Fr
TE	86	C. J. Woods	Sr
TE	87	Lake McRee	Jr
TE	88	Kade Eldridge	Fr
WR	89	Collin Fasse	Fr
WR	90	Asante Das	Sr
WR	91	Brady Jung	Fr

Defense

Pos.	#	Name	Class
S	0	Akili Arnold	Sr
CB	2	Jaylin Smith	Sr
LB	4	Easton Mascarenas-Arnold	Sr
DE	6	Anthony Lucas	Jr
S	7	Kamari Ramsey	So
S	8	Zion Branch	So
LB	9	Raesjon Davis	Sr
DE	10	Jamil Muhammad	Sr
LB	13	Mason Cobb	Sr
CB	14	Jacobe Covington	Sr
S	15	Anthony Beavers Jr.	Jr
CB	16	Prophet Brown	Jr
CB	17	DeCarlos Nicholson	Sr
LB	18	Eric Gentry	Sr
CB	19	John Humphrey	Sr
LB	21	Desman Stephens II	Fr
CB	22	Braylon Conley	Fr
CB	23	Greedy Vance Jr.	Sr
S	24	Christian Pierce	So
CB	25	Marcelles Williams	Fr
LB	26	Elijah Newby	Fr
S	27	Bryson Shaw	Sr
S	28	Jarvis Boatwright Jr.	Fr
CB	29	Maliki Crawford	Fr
S	30	Marquis Gallegos	Fr
LB	31	Jadyn Walker	Fr
DE	34	Braylan Shelby	So
DE	35	D. J. Peevy	Fr
S	36	Hunter Dunn	Jr
DE	37	Lorenzo Cowan	Fr
CB	38	Isaiah Rubin	Fr
DE	39	Garrett Pomerantz	Jr
CB	40	Shawn Sehra	So
LB	41	Garrison Madden	So
DE	44	Sam Greene	Fr
S	45	Brandon Shepherd	Jr
S	48	Thornton Mitchell	Jr
DE	49	Kameryn Fountain	Fr
LB	50	Matt Galván	Sr
LB	51	Ryan Quintanar	Sr
DT	53	Brendan Cho	Fr
DT	56	Elijah Hughes	So
LB	57	Roman Marchetti	So
DE	58	Solomon Tuliaupupu	Sr
DT	59	Malique Amos	Jr
DT	91	Gavin Meyer	Sr
DT	92	Carlon Jones	Fr
DT	93	Ratumana Bulabalavu	Fr
DT	94	Kobe Pepe	Sr
DT	97	Jide Abasiri	Fr
DE	98	Devan Thompkins	So
DT	99	Nate Clifton	Sr

Special teams

Pos.	#	Name	Class
P	16	Eddie Czaplicki	Sr
LS	31	Hank Pepper	Jr
P	36	Rey Sanchez	Jr
P	40	Cameron Shirangi	Sr
K	46	Denis Lynch	Jr
LS	47	Devin McDonough	Jr
K	48	Ryon Sayeri	Fr
K	95	Tyler Robles	Fr
K	96	Michael Lantz	Sr
K	98	Garth White	Sr

Head coach

- Lincoln Riley

Coordinators/assistant coaches

- Josh Henson – Offensive coordinator/offensive line
- D'Anton Lynn –Defensive coordinator
- Eric Henderson – Co-Defensive coordinator/run game coordinator/defensive line
- Ryan Dougherty – Special teams coordinator
- Doug Belk – Secondary
- Matt Entz – Assistant head coach for defense/linebackers
- Zach Hanson – Assistant head coach for offense/tight ends
- Luke Huard – Quarterbacks
- Anthony Jones Jr. – Running backs/run game coordinator
- Shaun Nua – Defensive ends
- Dennis Simmons – Assistant head coach/passing game coordinator/wide receivers
- Zach Crabtree – Assistant offensive line
- Taylor Mays – Assistant defensive backs
- Bennie Wylie – Director of football sports performance
- Dave Emerick – Senior associate athletic director for football/general manager
- Clarke Stroud – Director of football operations

- Spencer Jones – Offensive graduate assistant/WR
- Grayson Reed – Offensive graduate assistant/OL
- Bryson Allen-Williams – Defensive graduate assistant/LB
- Bookie Radley-Hiles – Defensive graduate assistant/DB
- Jim Hostler – Senior defensive analyst
- Brad Aoki – Offensive analyst/QB
- Skyler Jones – Defensive analyst/DL
- Caesar Martinez – Assistant director of football sports performance
- Drew Smith – Assistant director of football sports performance
- Adam Thackery – Assistant director of football sports performance
- Caleb Withrow – Assistant director of football sports performance
- Jackson Polk – Assistant director of sports science
- Eric Espinoza – Director of video operations
- Spencer Missioreck – Football video & systems analyst

Legend

- (C) Team captain
- (S) Suspended
- (I) Ineligible
- Injured
- Redshirt

Roster
Last update: 07/25/24

=== Injury report/Redshirting ===
Name	Position	Class	Injury	Duration
Maliki Crawford	CB	(redshirt) Freshman	tbd	Season
Anthony Lucas	DE	Junior	Lower Leg	Season
Eric Gentry	LB	Senior	Concussions	Season, return in 2025.
Raesjon Davis	LB	Senior	Redshirting	Season, return in 2025.
Gino Quinones	OL	(redshirt) Senior	tbd	Season, return in 2025.

=== Scholarship distribution chart ===
Position/Year	Freshman (32)	Sophomore (16)	Junior (12)	Senior (26)	2025 commit (22)	2026 commit (6)
QB 3 (1)	-	Jayden Maiava	Miller Moss; Jake Jensen	-	Husan Longstreet	-
RB 4 (2)	Bryan Jackson; A’Marion Peterson	Quinten Joyner	-	Jo’Quavious "Woody" Marks	Harry Dalton III; Riley Wormley	-
WR 11 (4)	Xavier Jordan	Zachariah Branch; Ja’Kobi Lane; Makai Lemon; Duce Robinson	Jay Fair; Kyron Hudson; Josiah Zamora	Kyle Ford; Jaden Richardson; Charles Ross	Tanook Hines; Romero Ison; Corey Simms	Ja’Myron Baker
TE 6 (1)	Kade Eldridge; Walker Lyons; Walter Matthews; Joey Olsen	Carson Tabaracci	Lake McRee	-	Nela Tupou	-
OL 14 (4)	Micah Bañuelos; Elijah Paige; Tobias Raymond; Makai Saina; Kalolo Ta’aga; Amos Talalele; Justin Tauanuu; Hayden Treter	Alani Noa; Erwin Taomi	Mason Murphy	Jonah Monheim; Gino Quinones; Emmanuel Pregnon	Aaron Dunn; Alex Payne; Elijah Vaikona; Willi Wascher	-
DL 7 (3)	Jide Abasiri; Ratumana Bulabalavu; Carlon Jones	Elijah Hughes	-	Nate Clifton; Gavin Meyer; Kobe Pepe	Floyd Boucard; Gus Cordova; Cash Jacobsen	-
DE 9 (2)	Lorenzo Cowan; Kameryn Fountain; Sam Greene; DJ Peevy	Braylan Shelby; Devan Thompkins	Anthony Lucas	Jamil Muhammad; Solomon Tuliaupupu	Jahkeem Stewart	Braeden Jones
LB 8 (2)	Elijah Newby; Desman Stephens II; Jadyn Walker	Garrison Madden	-	Mason Cobb; Raesjon Davis; Eric Gentry; Easton Mascarenas-Arnold	Matai Tagoa’i	Xavier Griffin
CB 10 (4)	Braylon Conley; Maliki Crawford; Isaiah Rubin; Marcelles Williams	-	Prophet Brown	Jacobe Covington; John Humphrey; DeCarlos Nicholson; Jaylin Smith; Greedy Vance Jr.	Trestin Castro; Alex Graham	Brandon Lockhart; RJ Sermons
S 8 (1)	Jarvis Boatwright Jr. Marquis Gallegos	Zion Branch; Christian Pierce; Kamari Ramsey	Anthony Beavers Jr.	Akili Arnold; Bryson Shaw	Kendarius Reddick	–
SP 5 (1)	Ryon Sayeri	-	Denis Lynch; Hank Pepper	Eddie Czaplicki; Michael Lantz	Will Weisberg	-
ATH (4)	x	x	x	x	James Johnson; Steve Miller	Joshua Holland II; Madden Riordan

- Scholarship Distribution 2024 chart

^ : the players who still have to make an official choice and the players who are eligible for the Covid year.

redshirt year used / redshirt year eligible / * Former Walk-on / LDS Mission

– 82 players on scholarship / 85 scholarships permitted

=== Coaching staff additions ===
Name	Position	Old team	Old position
D'Anton Lynn	Defensive coordinator	UCLA	Defensive coordinator
Eric Henderson	Co-Defensive coordinator / Run game coordinator / Defensive line	Los Angeles Rams	Run game coordinator / Defensive Line
Matt Entz	Assistant HC / Linebackers	North Dakota State	Head coach
Doug Belk	Defensive backs	Houston	Assistant HC / Defensive coordinator
Spencer Jones	Offensive graduate assistant	New Mexico State	Offensive consultant / Recruiting assistant
Skyler Jones	Defensive Analyst	Oregon	Defensive Analyst
Anthony Jones Jr.	Running backs / Run game coordinator	TCU	Running backs / Run game coordinator

=== Coaching staff departures ===
Name	Position	New Team	New Position
Alex Grinch	Defensive coordinator / Safeties	Wisconsin	Co-Defensive coordinator / Safeties
Brian Odom	Inside Linebackers / Associate HC for Defense	North Texas	Linebackers
Roy Manning	Outside Linebackers / Nickels / Assistant HC for Defense		
Donte Williams	Defensive backs / passing game coordinator	Georgia	Defensive Backs
Kliff Kingsbury	Senior offensive analyst	Washington Commanders	Offensive coordinator
Parker Henry	Defensive analyst	Nevada	Special teams coordinator / Linebackers
Will Johnson	Graduate assistant	North Dakota State	Defensive backs
Kiel McDonald	Running backs	Los Angeles Chargers (NFL)	Running backs
Derek Fa'avi	Offensive Analyst	Hawaii	Offensive Line

=== Transfers ===
==== Transfers out ====
The Trojans have lost 30 players via transfer.

Name	Pos.	Height	Weight	Year	Hometown	New school
Malachi Nelson	QB	6’3	190	Freshman	Los Alamitos, CA	Boise State
Isaac Ward	QB	5’10	185	(redshirt) Junior	Athens, GA	Furman
Raleek Brown	RB	5’8	185	Sophomore	Santa Ana, CA	Arizona State
Darwin Barlow	RB	6’0	220	(redshirt) Senior	Newton, TX	North Carolina
Matt Colombo	RB	5’10	195	(redshirt) Junior	El Segundo, CA	San Diego
Mario Williams	WR	5’9	175	Junior	Tampa, FL	Tulane
Michael Jackson III	WR	6’0	200	Junior	Las Vegas, NV	Georgia
Dorian Singer	WR	6’0	180	Junior	Saint Paul, MN	Utah
Jaden Moore	WR	5’11	192	Freshman	La Jolla, CA	
Jude Wolfe	TE	6’5	240	(redshirt) Senior	Laguna Hills, CA	San Diego State
Cooper Lovelace	OT	6’5	305	(redshirt) Senior	Prairie Village, KS	Northwestern
Michael Tarquin	OT	6’5	300	(redshirt) Senior	Ocala, FL	Oklahoma
Andrew Milek	IOL	6’5	315	(redshirt) Junior	Chandler, AZ	
Jason Zandamela	IOL	6’3	306	Freshman	Clearwater, FL	Florida
Andres Dewerk	IOL	6’7	330	(redshirt) Junior	San Jose, CA	Appalachian State
Korey Foreman	DL	6’4	235	Junior	Corona, CA	Fresno State
Jamar Sekona	DL	6’2	295	(redshirt) Sophomore	Fairfax, CA	Hawaii
De’jon Benton	DL	6’1	270	(redshirt) Senior	Pittsburg, CA	New Mexico
Isaiah Raikes	DL	6’2	320	(redshirt) Senior	Woodbury, NJ	Auburn
Stanley Ta’ufou’ou	DL	6’2	275	(redshirt) Senior	Simi Valley, CA	Arizona
Deijon Laffitte	DL	6’2	305	(redshirt) Freshman	Ontario, CA	Fresno State
Romello Height	RUSH	6’3	230	(redshirt) Junior	Dublin, GA	Georgia Tech
Tackett Curtis	LB	6’2	225	Freshman	Many, LA	Wisconsin
Chris Thompson Jr.	LB	6’2	230	Senior	Duncanville, TX	Tulsa
Domani Jackson	CB	6’1	190	Sophomore	Santa Ana, CA	Alabama
Fabian Ross	CB	6’0	200	Sophomore	Las Vegas, NV	Hawaii
Tre'Quon Fegans	CB	6’2	190	(redshirt) Sophomore	Alabaster, AL	UCF
Ceyair Wright	CB	6’1	175	(redshirt) Sophomore	Los Angeles, CA	Nebraska
Xamarion Gordon	S	6’1	210	(redshirt) Sophomore	Houston, TX	Coastal Carolina
Daniel Meunier	LS	5’10	225	(redshirt) Senior	Lynwood, CA	Texas State

==== Transfers in ====
The Trojans have added 17 players via transfer.

Name	Pos.	Height	Weight	Year	Hometown	Old school
Jayden Maiava	QB	6’4	220	(redshirt) Freshman	Las Vegas, NV	UNLV
Jo'Quavious Marks	RB	5’10	210	Senior	Atlanta, GA	Mississippi State
Jay Fair	WR	5’10	186	Sophomore	Dallas, TX	Auburn
Kyle Ford	WR	6’3	220	(redshirt) Senior	Corona, CA	UCLA
Jaden Richardson	WR	6’2	210	Senior	San Mateo, CA	Tufts
Charles Ross	WR	6’1	171	(redshirt) Junior	Culver City, CA	San José State
Nate Clifton	DL	6’5	280	Senior	La Vergne, TN	Vanderbilt
Gavin Meyer	DL	6’4	282	Junior	Franklin, WI	Wyoming
Easton Mascarenas-Arnold	LB	5’11	230	Junior	Mission Viejo, CA	Oregon State
DeCarlos Nicholson	CB	6’3	195	Senior	Petal, MS	Mississippi State
John Humphrey	CB	6’2	205	Senior	Pasadena, CA	UCLA
Greedy Vance Jr.	DB	5’11	170	(redshirt) Junior	Kenner, LA	Florida State
Akili Arnold	S	5’11	200	Senior	Mission Viejo, CA	Oregon State
Kamari Ramsey	S	6’1	205	(redshirt) Freshman	Palmdale, CA	UCLA
Michael Lantz	K	6’0	190	(redshirt) Senior	Peachtree City, GA	Georgia Southern
Cameron Shirangi	P	6’2	190	Senior	San Juan Capistrano, CA	Hawaii
Hank Pepper	LS	6’2	210	(redshirt) Sophomore	Chandler, AZ	Michigan State

=== NFL draft ===
==== Entered NFL draft ====
The following players have headed for the 2024 NFL Draft : QB Caleb Williams, RB MarShawn Lloyd, RB Austin Jones, WR Brenden Rice, WR Tahj Washington, OL Justin Dedich, OL Jarrett Kingston, DL Jack Sullivan, DL Kyon Barrs, DL Tyrone Taleni, EDGE Solomon Byrd, LB Shane Lee, CB Christian Roland-Wallace, S Calen Bullock, S Max Williams, P Aadyn Sleep-Dalton, LS Jac Casasante.

Player	Position	Round	Pick	Drafted by
Caleb Williams	QB	1	1	Chicago Bears
Calen Bullock	S	3	78	Houston Texans
MarShawn Lloyd	RB	3	88	Green Bay Packers
Jarrett Kingston	IOL	6	215	San Francisco 49ers
Brenden Rice	WR	7	225	Los Angeles Chargers
Solomon Byrd	EDGE	7	238	Houston Texans
Tahj Washington	WR	7	241	Miami Dolphins
Christian Roland-Wallace	CB	UDFA		Kansas City Chiefs
Shane Lee	LB	UDFA		Los Angeles Chargers
Austin Jones	RB	UDFA		Washington Commanders
Justin Dedich	C	UDFA		Los Angeles Rams
Kyron Barrs	DL	UDFA		Seattle Seahawks

==== NFL Draft combine ====
Eight members of the 2023 team were invited to participate in drills at the 2024 NFL Scouting Combine.

2024 NFL combine participants
Name	POS	HT	WT	Arms	Hands	40	10-yd Split	Bench press	Vert jump	Broad jump	3-cone drill	20-yd shuttle	Ref
Caleb Williams	QB	6’ 1’’	214	32’’	9 3/4’’	DNP							
MarShawn Lloyd	RB	5’ 9’’	220	30 3/8’’	8 3/4’’	4.46	1.56	25	36’’	9’ 10’’	DNP		
Brenden Rice	WR	6’ 2’’	208	33’’	9 5/8’’	4.50	1.55	13	36.5’’	9’ 11’’	DNP		
Tahj Washington	WR	5’ 10’’	174	29 1/8’’	8 3/8’’	DNP			35’’	10’ 2’’	DNP		
Jarrett Kingston	OG	6’ 4’’	306	32 1/8’’	9 3/4’’	5.02	1.73	32	31.5’’	9’ 3’’	7.53	4.47	
Solomon Byrd	EDGE	6’ 3’’	255	28 7/8’’	9 1/4’’	DNP							
Christian Roland-Wallace	CB	5’ 11 1/2’’	201	32 1/2’’	9’’	DNP		17	DNP				
Calen Bullock	S	6’ 2’’	188	32 1/2’’	9’’	4.48	1.51	DNP					

† Top performer DNP = Did not participate

==== USC Pro Day ====
USC's Pro Day will be on March 20, 2024.

2024 USC Pro Day
Name	POS	HT	WT	Arms	Hands	40	Bench via press	Vert jump	Broad jump	3-cone drill	20-yd shuttle
Caleb Williams	QB	6’0 7/8’’	217	–	9 7/8’’	–	–	–	–	–	–
Austin Jones	RB	5’9 5/8’’	200	29 7/8’’	8 1/4’’	4.57	–	36.5’’	10’	7.02	4.39
MarShawn Lloyd	RB	5’9 1/2’’	221	30 1/2’’	8 5/8’’	–	–	–	–	–	–
Brenden Rice	WR	6’2 1/2’’	208	33’’	9 1/2’’	–	–	–	–	6.94	4.32
John Jackson III	WR (2022)	5’11 3/4’’	196	31 1/4’’	9 5/8’’	4.71	11	33’’	10’	–	–
Tahj Washington	WR	5’9 7/8’’	174	29 1/8’’	8 1/2’’	4.52	–	34.5’’	10’3’’	6.81	4.22
Joe Bryson	OT (2022)	6’7 1/4’’	300	33 5/8’’	8 5/8’’	–	22	30’’	8’10’’	7.95	4.95
Jarrett Kingston	OG	6’4 1/8’’	308	32 1/4’’	9 7/8’’	–	36	–	–	–	–
Justin Dedich	C	6’2’’	301	31 3/4’’	9 3/4’’	5.38	32	30.5’’	8’7’’	7.77	4.72
Brett Neilon	C (2022)	6’1 3/4’’	290	31’’	9 1/4’’	–	30	31.5’’	8’4’’	8.0	–
Kyon Barrs	DL	6’1 1/2’’	301	33 1/2’’	9 3/8’’	5.15	28	28.5’’	8’11’’	7.69	4.75
Tyrone Taleni	DL	6’2’’	279	32’’	10 1/8’’	5.20	–	29’’	8’5’’	7.57	4.50
Solomon Byrd	EDGE	6’3’’	251	33 1/2’’	9 7/8’’	5.01	18	32’’	9’6’’	7.45	4.59
Shane Lee	LB	6’0 1/4’’	243	31 1/2’’	9’’	4.65	21	33.5’’	9’6’’	7.11	4.53
Christian Roland-Wallace	CB	5’11 1/2’’	202	32’’	8 7/8’’	4.63	–	37.5’’	9’11’’	7.13	4.52
Calen Bullock	S	6’2 1/8’’	187	32 3/4’’	9’’	–	8	33’’	10’	–	–
Max Williams	S	5’8 1/4’’	181	29 3/8’’	8 3/8’’	4.63	14	31.5’’	9’1’’	7.20	4.51
Aadyn Sleep-Dalton	P	6’0 1/8’’	183	30 5/8’’	9 3/8’’	–	–	25’’	8’4’’	–	–
Jac Casasante	LS	5’11 1/2’’	233	31 7/8’’	9 3/8’’	4.90	22	28.5’’	9’2’’	–	4.56

† Top performer DNP = Did not participate

=== CFL draft ===
==== CFL global draft ====
The following player have headed for the 2024 CFL global Draft : DL Tyrone Taleni.

Player	Position	Round	Pick	Drafted by
Tyrone Taleni	DL	1	3	Saskatchewan Roughriders

=== Returning starters ===
Offense

Player	Position	Games started
Miller Moss	Quarterback	1 game
Zachariah Branch	Wide receiver	9 games
Kyron Hudson	Wide receiver	4 games
Lake McRee	Tight end	4 games
Jonah Monheim	Offensive tackle	13 games
Emmanuel Pregnon	Offensive guard	12 games
Mason Murphy	Offensive tackle	5 games
Gino Quinones	Offensive guard	1 game
Alani Noa	Offensive guard	1 game
Elijah Paige	Offensive tackle	1 game

Defense

Player	Position	Games started
Bear Alexander	Defensive line	12 games
Anthony Lucas	Defensive line	1 game
Jamil Muhammad	Rush	11 games
Mason Cobb	Linebacker	9 games
Raesjon Davis	Linebacker	3 games
Eric Gentry	Linebacker	3 games
Jacobe Covington	Cornerback	2 games
Prophet Brown	Cornerback	1 game
Jaylin Smith	Safety	12 games
Bryson Shaw	Safety	3 games
Zion Branch	Safety	1 game
Anthony Beavers Jr.	Safety	1 game

Special teams

Player	Position	Games started
Eddie Czaplicki	Punter	13 games
Denis Lynch	Kicker	13 games

=== Recruiting class ===
USC signed 22 players in the 2024 recruiting cycle. 1 committed player unsigned. 2 JuCo. 5 walk-on.

College recruiting (2024)
Name	Hometown	School	Height	Weight	Commit date
Kameryn Fountain #9 EDGE #63 nat.	Atlanta, GA	Booker T. Washington HS	6 ft 5 in (1.96 m)	237 lb (108 kg)	June 5, 2023 (Committed) / December 20, 2023 (Signed)
Kameryn Fountain #9 EDGE #63 nat.	Recruit ratings: Rivals: 247Sports: On3: ESPN:				
Xavier Jordan #20 WR #97 nat.	Los Angeles, CA	Sierre Canyon HS	6 ft 1 in (1.85 m)	165 lb (75 kg)	May 1, 2023 (Committed) / December 20, 2023 (Signed)
Xavier Jordan #20 WR #97 nat.	Recruit ratings: Rivals: 247Sports: On3: ESPN:				
Jason Zandamela #6 IOL #118 nat.	Clearwater, FL	Clearwater Academy International	6 ft 3 in (1.91 m)	285 lb (129 kg)	June 20, 2023 (Committed) / December 20, 2023 (Signed)
Jason Zandamela #6 IOL #118 nat.	Recruit ratings: Rivals: 247Sports: On3: ESPN:				
Elijah Newby #9 LB #153 nat.	Cheshire, CT	Cheshire Academy	6 ft 3 in (1.91 m)	210 lb (95 kg)	June 9, 2023 (Committed) / December 20, 2023 (Signed)
Elijah Newby #9 LB #153 nat.	Recruit ratings: Rivals: 247Sports: On3: ESPN:				
Marcelles Williams #21 CB #160 nat.	Bellflower, CA	St. John Bosco HS	5 ft 11 in (1.80 m)	185 lb (84 kg)	June 18, 2023 (Committed) / December 20, 2023 (Signed)
Marcelles Williams #21 CB #160 nat.	Recruit ratings: Rivals: 247Sports: On3: ESPN:				
Carlon Jones #19 DL #211 nat.	Bay City, TX	Bay City HS	6 ft 3 in (1.91 m)	285 lb (129 kg)	December 18, 2023 (Committed) / December 20, 2023 (Signed)
Carlon Jones #19 DL #211 nat.	Recruit ratings: Rivals: 247Sports: On3: ESPN:				
Walter Matthews #14 TE #234 nat.	Hiram, GA	Hiram HS	6 ft 7 in (2.01 m)	245 lb (111 kg)	June 14, 2023 (Committed) / December 20, 2023 (Signed)
Walter Matthews #14 TE #234 nat.	Recruit ratings: Rivals: 247Sports: On3: ESPN:				
Jide Abasiri #28 DL #287 nat.	Prior Lake, MN	Prior Lake HS	6 ft 5 in (1.96 m)	290 lb (130 kg)	December 14, 2023 (Committed) / December 20, 2023 (Signed)
Jide Abasiri #28 DL #287 nat.	Recruit ratings: Rivals: 247Sports: On3: ESPN:				
Joey Olsen #21 TE #303 nat.	Lake Oswego, OR	Lakeridge HS	6 ft 5 in (1.96 m)	220 lb (100 kg)	September 14, 2022 (Committed) / December 20, 2023 (Signed)
Joey Olsen #21 TE #303 nat.	Recruit ratings: Rivals: 247Sports: On3: ESPN:				
Desman Stephens II #29 LB #331 nat.	Clarkston, MI	Clarkston HS	6 ft 2 in (1.88 m)	208 lb (94 kg)	November 23, 2023 (Committed) / December 20, 2023 (Signed)
Desman Stephens II #29 LB #331 nat.	Recruit ratings: Rivals: 247Sports: On3: ESPN:				
Marquis Gallegos #37 S #377 nat.	Los Angeles, CA	Sierra Canyon HS	6 ft 1 in (1.85 m)	175 lb (79 kg)	June 27, 2023 (Committed) / December 20, 2023 (Signed)
Marquis Gallegos #37 S #377 nat.	Recruit ratings: Rivals: 247Sports: On3: ESPN:				
Makai Saina #35 IOL #390 nat.	Arlington, TX	Martin HS	6 ft 4 in (1.93 m)	290 lb (130 kg)	June 27, 2023 (Committed) / December 20, 2023 (Signed)
Makai Saina #35 IOL #390 nat.	Recruit ratings: Rivals: 247Sports: On3: ESPN:				
Isaiah Rubin #45 CB #471 nat.	Los Alamitos, CA	Los Alamitos HS	6 ft 1 in (1.85 m)	170 lb (77 kg)	October 20, 2023 (Committed) / February 7, 2024 (Signed)
Isaiah Rubin #45 CB #471 nat.	Recruit ratings: Rivals: 247Sports: On3: ESPN:				
Justin Tauanuu #37 OT #561 nat.	Huntington Beach, CA	Huntington Beach HS	6 ft 6 in (1.98 m)	285 lb (129 kg)	November 10, 2023 (Committed) / December 20, 2023 (Signed)
Justin Tauanuu #37 OT #561 nat.	Recruit ratings: Rivals: 247Sports: On3: ESPN:				
Jarvis Boatwright Jr. #61 S #627 nat.	Clearwater, FL	Clearwater HS	6 ft 1 in (1.85 m)	170 lb (77 kg)	June 4, 2023 (Committed) / December 20, 2023 (Signed)
Jarvis Boatwright Jr. #61 S #627 nat.	Recruit ratings: Rivals: 247Sports: On3: ESPN:				
Bryan Jackson #51 RB #645 nat.	McKinney, TX	McKinney HS	6 ft 0 in (1.83 m)	240 lb (110 kg)	April 21, 2023 (Committed) / December 20, 2023 (Signed)
Bryan Jackson #51 RB #645 nat.	Recruit ratings: Rivals: 247Sports: On3: ESPN:				
Braylon Conley #68 CB #673 nat.	Humble, TX	Atascocita HS	6 ft 0 in (1.83 m)	170 lb (77 kg)	June 30, 2023 (Committed) / December 20, 2023 (Signed)
Braylon Conley #68 CB #673 nat.	Recruit ratings: Rivals: 247Sports: On3: ESPN:				
Ratumana Bulabalavu #67 DL #766 nat.	Stockton, CA	Army and Navy Academy	6 ft 4 in (1.93 m)	245 lb (111 kg)	February 6, 2024 (Committed) / February 7, 2024 (Signed)
Ratumana Bulabalavu #67 DL #766 nat.	Recruit ratings: Rivals: 247Sports: On3: ESPN:				
Kalolo Ta’aga #49 OT #768 nat.	East Palo Alto, CA	Archbishop Riordan HS	6 ft 7 in (2.01 m)	265 lb (120 kg)	December 17, 2023 (Committed) / December 20, 2023 (Signed)
Kalolo Ta’aga #49 OT #768 nat.	Recruit ratings: Rivals: 247Sports: On3: ESPN:				
Lorenzo Cowan #70 EDGE #839 nat.	Savannah, GA	Jenkins HS	6 ft 4 in (1.93 m)	220 lb (100 kg)	December 15, 2023 (Committed) / December 20, 2023 (Signed)
Lorenzo Cowan #70 EDGE #839 nat.	Recruit ratings: Rivals: 247Sports: On3: ESPN:				
Hayden Treter #107 OT #1143 nat.	Englewood, CO	Cherry Creek HS	6 ft 6 in (1.98 m)	300 lb (140 kg)	June 4, 2023 (Committed) / December 20, 2023 (Signed)
Hayden Treter #107 OT #1143 nat.	Recruit ratings: Rivals: 247Sports: On3: ESPN:				
Jadyn Walker #114 LB #1178 nat.	Portage, MI	Portage Northern HS	6 ft 3 in (1.91 m)	205 lb (93 kg)	February 7, 2024 (Committed) / February 7, 2024 (Signed)
Jadyn Walker #114 LB #1178 nat.	Recruit ratings: Rivals: 247Sports: On3: ESPN:				
Erwin Taomi; JuCo OT	Santa Maria, CA	Allan Hancock College	6 ft 5 in (1.96 m)	340 lb (150 kg)	July 24, 2024 (Committed/Signed)
Erwin Taomi; JuCo OT	Recruit ratings: No ratings found				
Devin McDonough; JuCo LS	Redondo Beach, CA	El Camino College	6 ft 2 in (1.88 m)	220 lb (100 kg)	May 6, 2024 (Committed) / Walk-On (Fall Camp)
Devin McDonough; JuCo LS	Recruit ratings: No ratings found				
Rey Sanchez; JuCo P	Carson, CA	Long Beach City College	6 ft 2 in (1.88 m)	203 lb (92 kg)	May 7, 2024 (Committed) / Walk-On (Fall Camp)
Rey Sanchez; JuCo P	Recruit ratings: No ratings found				
Ryon Sayeri; K	West Hills, CA	Chaminade HS	5 ft 11 in (1.80 m)	167 lb (76 kg)	February 13, 2024 (Committed) / Walk-On (Fall Camp)
Ryon Sayeri; K	Recruit ratings: No ratings found				
Jack Stupin; QB	Tustin, CA	Tustin HS	6 ft 2 in (1.88 m)	200 lb (91 kg)	March 31, 2024 (Committed) / Walk-On (Fall Camp)
Jack Stupin; QB	Recruit ratings: Rivals: 247Sports:				
Travis Leonard; C	Long Beach, CA	Junipero Serra HS	6 ft 2 in (1.88 m)	295 lb (134 kg)	May 2, 2024 (Committed) / Walk-On (Fall Camp)
Travis Leonard; C	Recruit ratings: No ratings found				
Collin Fasse; WR	Santa Maria, CA	St Joseph HS	6 ft 0 in (1.83 m)	185 lb (84 kg)	May 6, 2024 (Committed) / Walk-On (Fall Camp)
Collin Fasse; WR	Recruit ratings: No ratings found				
Brady Jung; WR	Menlo Park, CA	Menlo HS	6 ft 0 in (1.83 m)	170 lb (77 kg)	June 21, 2024 (Committed) / Walk-On (Fall Camp)
Brady Jung; WR	Recruit ratings: No ratings found				
Overall recruit ranking: 247Sports: 17th On3: 18th
Note: In many cases, Scout, Rivals, 247Sports, On3, and ESPN may conflict in their listings of height and weight.; In these cases, the average was taken. ESPN grades are on a 100-point scale.; Sources: "2024 USC Football Commitments". Rivals.; "2024 Team Ranking". Rivals.com.; "USC 2024 Football Commitments". 247Sports.

== Rankings ==
Ranking movements Legend: ██ Increase in ranking ██ Decrease in ranking — = Not ranked RV = Received votes
	Week																
Poll	Pre	1	2	3	4	5	6	7	8	9	10	11	12	13	14	15	Final
AP	23	13	11	11	13	11	RV	RV	—	—	—	—	—	—	—	—	—
Coaches	23	14	11	12	16	15	RV	—	—	—	—	—	—	—	—	—	—
CFP	Not released										—	—	—	—	—	—	Not released

== Statistics ==
=== Team ===
	USC	Opp
Scoring
Total	392	313
Points per game	30.1	24.0
First downs
Total	303	262
Rushing	100	95
Passing	182	146
Penalty	21	21
Rushing
Total yards	1,889	1,836
Avg per play	5.2	4.5
Avg per game	145.3	141.2
Touchdowns	20	19
Passing
Total yards	3,795	3,066
Att-Comp-Int	534-335-15	437-296-12
Avg per pass	7.1	7.0
Avg per game	291.9	235.8
Touchdowns	29	15
Total offense
Total yards	5,684	4,902
Avg per play	6.3	5.8
Avg per game	437.2	377.1
Kicking
Punts-Yards	45-2,153	53-2,288
Avg per punt	47.8	43.1
Field goals-Attempts	14-21	16-20
Penalties
Total-Yards	75-668	78-648
Avg per game	51.3	49.8
Time of possession
Total	06:34:49	06:25:11
Avg per game	30:22	29:38
Miscellaneous
3rd down conversions	44.8%	33.5%
4th down conversions	47.0%	57.1%
Fumbles-Lost	15-6	10-6
Sacks-Yards	21-113	15-105
PAT-Attempts	50-50	33-35
Red Zone Attempts-Score	49-55	39-47
Red Zone TD	39	26
Touchdowns scored	50	38
Attendance
Total	429,427	335,352
Games/Avg per game	71,571	67,070
Neutral Site	45,320	

=== Scoring ===
==== USC vs. non-conference opponents ====
	1	2	3	4	OT	Total
USC	10	41	17	42	0	110
Opponents	7	17	28	17	0	69

==== USC vs. B1G opponents ====
	1	2	3	4	OT	Total
USC	45	84	80	73	0	282
B1G opponents	50	64	68	59	3	244

==== USC vs. all opponents ====
	1	2	3	4	OT	Total
USC	55	125	97	115	0	392
Opponents	57	81	96	76	3	313

=== Individual Leaders ===
==== Offense ====
Passing statistics
#	NAME	POS	RAT	CMP	ATT	YDS	AVG/G	CMP%	TD	INT	LONG
7	Miller Moss	QB	135.09	233	362	2,555	283.8	64.36%	18	9	70
14	Jayden Maiava	QB	133.84	101	169	1,201	171.5	59.76%	11	6	64
	Team		-	1	1	39	-	100%	-	-	-
	TOTALS	-	134.73	335	534	3,795	291.92	62.73%	29	15	70

Rushing statistics
#	NAME	POS	ATT	NET	AVG	TD	LONG	AVG/G
0	Quinten Joyner	RB	63	478	7.6	3	75	39.8
4	Woody Marks	RB	198	1,133	5.7	9	65	94.4
21	Bryan Jackson	RB	36	188	5.2	1	23	14.5
22	A’Marion Peterson	RB	16	65	4.1	1	14	6.5
7	Miller Moss	QB	21	-18	-0.9	2	9	-2
14	Jayden Maiava	QB	20	45	2.3	4	13	6.4
17	Jake Jensen	QB	1	-1	-1.0	0	0	-0.5
1	Zachariah Branch	WR	2	17	8.5	0	15	1.4
	Team	-	9	-18	-2.0	0	0	-1.4
	TOTALS	-	366	1,889	5.2	20	75	145.3

Receiving statistics
#	NAME	POS	CTH	YDS	AVG	TD	LONG	AVG/G
1	Zachariah Branch	WR	47	503	10.7	1	42	41.9
2	Duce Robinson	WR	23	396	17.2	5	48	33.0
6	Makai Lemon	WR	52	764	14.6	3	70	63.6
8	Ja'Kobi Lane	WR	43	525	12.2	12	33	40.3
9	Jay Fair	WR	8	78	9.7	1	24	9.7
10	Kyron Hudson	WR	38	462	12.1	3	39	38.5
15	Jaden Richardson	WR	1	19	19.0	0	19	6.3
81	Kyle Ford	WR	26	317	12.1	3	41	24.3
84	Charles Ross	WR	1	11	11.0	0	11	3.6
85	Walker Lyons	TE	6	36	6.0	0	11	3.2
87	Lake McRee	TE	24	245	10.2	0	34	24.5
88	Kade Eldridge	TE	3	19	6.3	0	11	1.5
0	Quinten Joyner	RB	12	89	7.4	1	13	7.4
4	Woody Marks	RB	47	321	6.8	0	33	26.7
21	Bryan Jackson	RB	1	0	0	0	0	0
22	A’Marion Peterson	RB	2	13	6.5	0	9	1.3
14	Jayden Maiava	QB	1	-3	0	0	0	-0.4
	TOTALS	-	335	3,795	11.3	29	70	291.9

==== Defense ====
Defense statistics
#	NAME	POS	SOLO	AST	TOT	TFL-YDS	SACK-YDS	INT-YDS	BU	QBH	FR-YDS	FF	BLK	SAF	TD
56	Elijah Hughes	DT	4	2	6	1.0–5	1.0–5	–	–	–	–	–	–	–	–
90	Bear Alexander	DT	3	1	4	–	–	–	–	1	–	–	–	–	–
91	Gavin Meyer	DT	18	14	32	2.0–10	1.0–8	–	3	3	–	–	1	–	–
94	Kobe Pepe	DT	9	10	19	–	–	–	1	–	–	–	–	–	–
97	Jide Abasiri	DT	3	4	7	–	–	–	–	–	–	–	–	–	–
98	Devan Thompkins	DT	14	10	24	2.5–10	1.5–9	–	3	–	–	–	–	–	–
99	Nate Clifton	DT	13	8	21	2.0–9	1.0–6	–	2	–	1–0	–	–	–	–
6	Anthony Lucas	DE	5	11	16	–	–	–	1	–	–	–	–	–	–
10	Jamil Muhammad	DE	6	21	27	1.5–5	1.0–5	–	–	3	–	–	–	–	–
34	Braylan Shelby	DE	19	9	28	5.0–22	3.0–14	–	1	2	–	–	–	–	–
44	Sam Greene	DE	10	5	15	3.0–8	1.0–5	–	–	2	–	–	–	–	–
49	Kameryn Fountain	DE	10	9	19	4.5–14	2.0–5	–	–	1	–	–	–	–	–
58	Solomon Tuliaupupu	DE	8	5	13	1.0–1	1.0–1	–	–	1	1–0	–	–	–	–
4	Easton Mascarenas-Arnold	LB	52	43	95	5.0–20	3.0–14	2–5	1	2	1–0	–	–	–	–
9	Raesjon Davis	LB	4	1	5	–	–	–	–	–	–	–	–	–	–
13	Mason Cobb	LB	31	41	72	2.5–7	–	2–55	3	1	–	–	–	–	1
15	Anthony Beavers Jr.	LB	10	8	18	–	–	–	–	–	–	–	–	–	–
18	Eric Gentry	LB	22	11	33	6.5–17	2.0–11	–	1	1	1–0	1	–	–	–
23	Desman Stephens II	LB	8	5	13	1.0–1	–	1–42	–	1	–	1	–	–	–
26	Elijah Newby	LB	–	2	2	–	–	–	–	–	–	–	–	–	–
41	Garrison Madden	LB	5	–	5	–	–	–	–	–	–	–	–	–	–
57	Roman Marchetti	LB	1	–	1	–	–	–	–	–	–	–	–	–	–
2	Jaylin Smith	CB	40	19	59	4.0–5	–	2–0	2	–	–	–	–	–	–
14	Jacobe Covington	CB	22	8	30	1.0–3	–	–	3	–	–	1	–	–	–
16	Prophet Brown	CB	8	3	11	–	–	–	1	–	–	–	–	–	–
17	DeCarlos Nicholson	CB	18	9	27	–	–	–	5	–	–	–	–	–	–
19	John Humphrey	CB	15	8	23	–	–	1–15	3	–	–	–	–	–	–
21	Greedy Vance Jr.	CB	22	7	29	1.0–2	–	1–0	2	–	–	–	–	–	–
22	Braylon Conley	CB	–	1	1	0.5–3	–	–	–	–	–	–	–	–	–
25	Marcelles Williams	CB	1	–	1	1.0–1	–	–	1	–	–	–	–	–	–
0	Akili Arnold	S	36	24	60	0.5–2	0.5–2	1–26	1	1	–	–	–	–	–
7	Kamari Ramsey	S	43	17	60	5.5–26	2.0–19	1–0	5	1	–	2	–	–	–
8	Zion Branch	S	15	4	19	2.0–10	1.0–9	–	3	–	–	–	–	–	–
24	Christian Pierce	S	5	3	8	–	–	–	–	–	–	–	–	–	–
27	Bryson Shaw	S	14	7	21	–	–	–	1	–	–	–	–	–	–
30	Marquis Gallegos	S	–	1	1	–	–	–	–	–	–	–	–	–	–
	TEAM	-	11	3	14	–	–	1–35	–	–	2–0	–	–	–	–
	TOTAL	-	505	334	839	53.0–181	21.0–113	12–178	43	20	6-0	5	1	–	1

Key: POS: Position, SOLO: Solo Tackles, AST: Assisted Tackles, TOT: Total Tackles, TFL: Tackles-for-loss, SACK: Quarterback Sacks, INT: Interceptions, BU: Passes Broken Up, PD: Passes Defended, QBH: Quarterback Hits, FR: Fumbles Recovered, FF: Forced Fumbles, BLK: Kicks or Punts Blocked, SAF: Safeties, TD : Touchdown

==== Special teams ====
Kicking statistics
#	NAME	POS	XPM	XPA	XP%	FGM	FGA	FG%	1–19	20–29	30–39	40–49	50+	LNG
96	Michael Lantz	K	50	50	100%	14	21	66.6%	1/1	6/8	3/4	3/6	1/2	54
	TOTALS	-	50	50	100%	14	21	66.6%	1/1	6/8	3/4	3/6	1/2	54

Kickoff statistics
#	NAME	POS	KICKS	YDS	AVG	TB	OB
96	Michael Lantz	K	76	4,897	64.4	55	0
	TOTALS	-	76	4,897	64.4	55	0

Punting statistics
#	NAME	POS	PUNTS	YDS	AVG	LONG	TB	I–20	50+	BLK
16	Eddie Czaplicki	P	43	2,057	47.8	62	1	25	21	0
48	Ryon Sayeri	K/P	1	57	57.0	57	0	1	1	0
7	Miller Moss	QB	1	39	39.0	39	0	1	0	0
	TOTALS	-	45	2,153	47.8	62	1	27	22	0

Kick return statistics
#	NAME	POS	RTNS	YDS	AVG	TD	LNG
1	Zachariah Branch	RET	5	105	21.0	0	46
6	Makai Lemon	RET	19	514	27.0	0	80
22	A’Marion Peterson	RET	2	23	11.5	0	14
44	Josiah Zamora	RET	1	17	17.0	0	17
	Team		1	-13	-13.0	0	0
	TOTALS	-	28	646	23.0	0	80

Punt return statistics
#	NAME	POS	RTNS	YDS	AVG	TD	LONG
1	Zachariah Branch	RET	13	74	5.6	0	20
	TOTALS	-	13	74	5.6	0	20
