= Jayden Maiava =

American football player (born 2003)

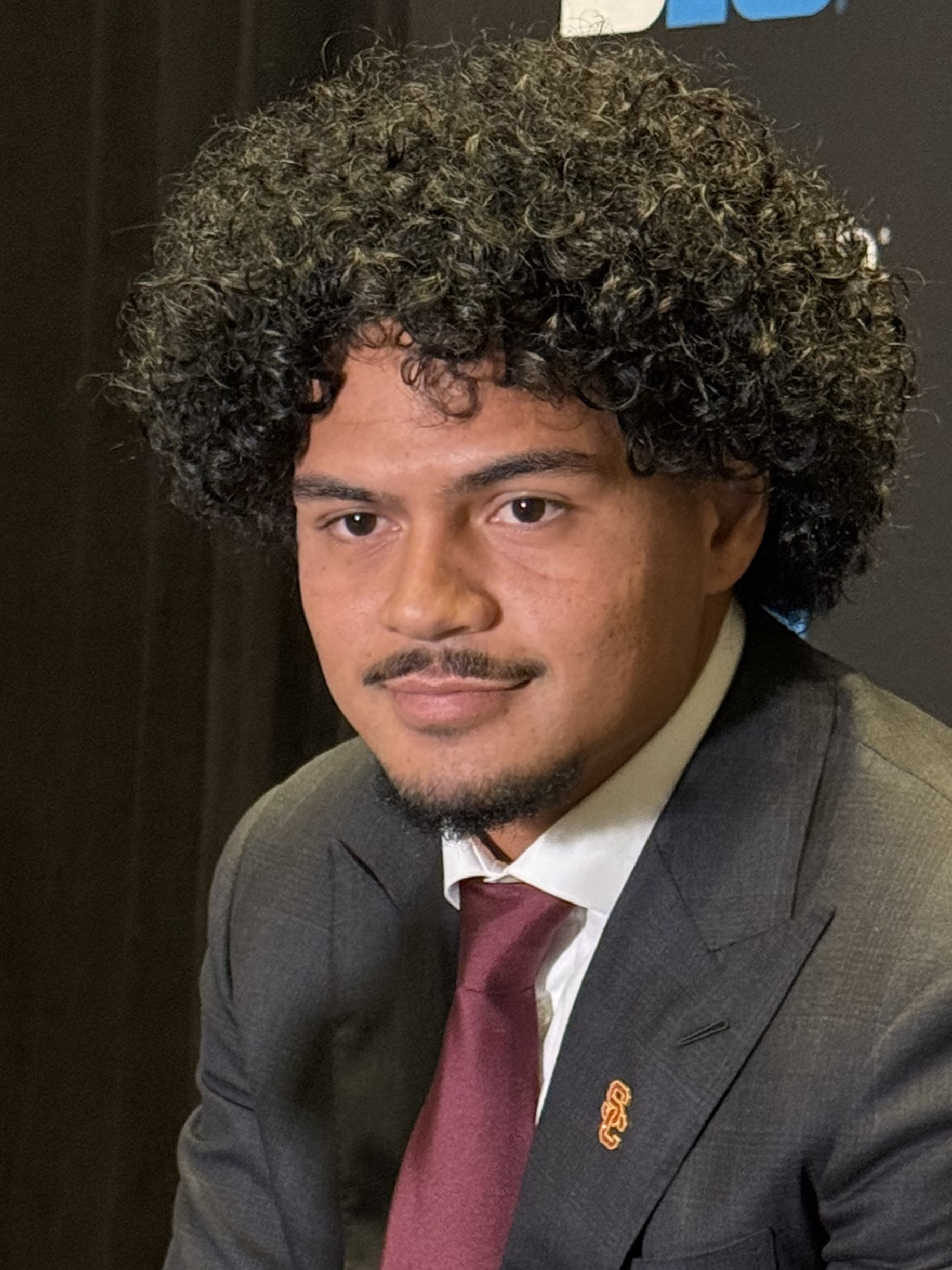
- Maiava at 2026 Big Ten Media Day

No. 14 – USC Trojans
- Position: Quarterback
- Class: (redshirt) Senior

Personal information
- Born: April 6, 2003 (age 23); Honolulu, Hawaii, U.S.
- Listed height: 6 ft 4 in (1.93 m)
- Listed weight: 225 lb (102 kg)

Career information
- High school: Liberty (Henderson, Nevada)
- College: UNLV (2022–2023); USC (2024–present)

Awards and highlights
- MW Freshman of the Year (2023); Second-team All-MW (2023); Third-team All-Big Ten (2025)
- Stats at ESPN

Jayden Ikaika Maiava (/maɪɑːvə/ my-AH-vuh; born April 6, 2003) is an American college football quarterback for the USC Trojans. He previously played for the UNLV Rebels.

== Early life ==
Maiava was born on April 6, 2003, in Honolulu, Hawa'ii. He grew up in Pālolo, Hawaii in a household with over 20 members of his extended family. Maiava initially moved to Nevada in 2018, where he spent his freshman year of high school at Sierra Vista High School in Las Vegas, before moving back to Hawaii where he attended Kaimuki High School in Honolulu. With Kaimuki in 2019, Maiava threw for 3,317 yards and 41 touchdowns. Following the cancellation of the Kaimuki's season in 2020 due to the COVID-19 pandemic, Maiava returned to Nevada in 2021, attending Liberty High School in Henderson. During his senior season at Henderson, he threw for 2,027 passing yards and 24 touchdowns, with an appearance in the Nevada state title game, where they fell short against Bishop Gorman High School. A three-star recruit, Maiava committed to play college football at the University of Nevada, Las Vegas over offers from Auburn, Louisville, and Tennessee.

== College career ==
=== UNLV ===
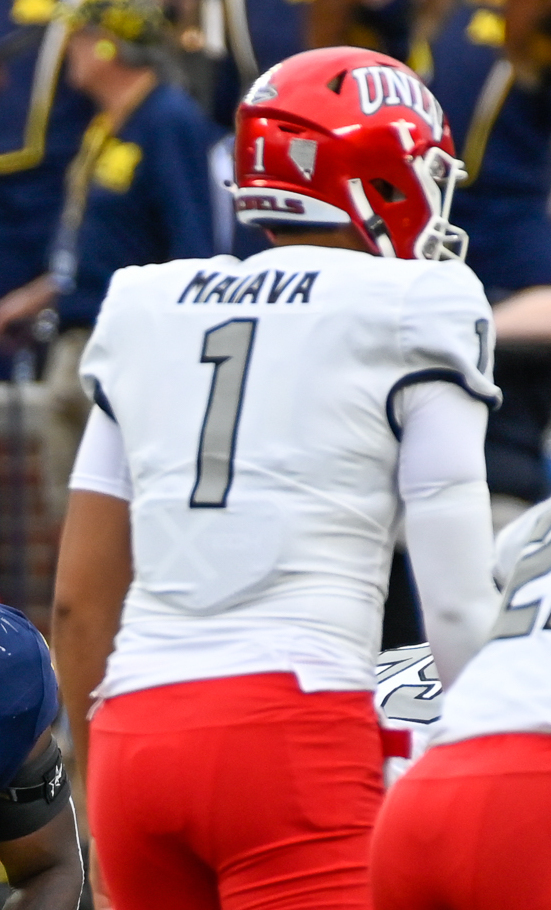
Maiava with UNLV in 2023

After redshirting in 2022, Maiava began the 2023 season as a backup. After an injury to Doug Brumfield against Vanderbilt, Maiava led UNLV to a comeback victory, throwing for 261 yards and combining for two touchdowns. The following week against UTEP, he made his first career start leading UNLV to a 45–28 victory. After finishing the regular season passing for 2,626 yards and 14 touchdowns, Maiava was named the Mountain West Freshman of the Year and to the all-conference second team. Following the conclusion of the regular season, he announced that he would be returning to UNLV the following season, despite speculation that he would transfer. However, Maiava went back on this decision on January 1, 2024, announcing that he would be entering the transfer portal.

=== USC ===
On January 8, 2024, Maiava announced that he would be transferring to the University of Georgia to play for the Georgia Bulldogs. However, the following day, he announced that he had flipped his commitment to the University of Southern California to play for the USC Trojans. Entering the 2024 season, Maiava was named as the backup to Miller Moss. After a 4–5 start to the season, Moss was benched, and Maiava was named the starter, becoming the first Polynesian quarterback to start at USC. In his first start with the Trojans against Nebraska, he threw for 249 yards and totaled four touchdowns, three passing and one rushing, leading USC to a 28–20 victory. In the 2024 Las Vegas Bowl, Maiava threw for 295 yards, four touchdowns, and three interceptions, leading the Trojans to a 35–31 comeback victory.

Maiava led a strong start for the Trojans in 2025, piloting a 4–0 start to their season. USC suffered their first loss of the season against Illinois 34–32, where Maiava completed 30 of 43 passes for 364 yards, two touchdowns, both to wide receiver Makai Lemon, and one interception. Following a win against Michigan, Maiava and the trojans would fall short against rival Notre Dame, where he threw two touchdowns and two interceptions. After a win streak of three games, where Maiava compiled a total of 688 passing yards, three touchdowns and two interceptions, Maiava and the Trojans would fall to Oregon. USC would make an appearance in the Alamo Bowl, where they would lose in overtime to TCU 27–30. In 2025, Maiava finished the season with 3,711 passing yards with 24 touchdowns and 10 interceptions, and was a semifinalist for the Davey O'Brien Award.

=== Statistics ===
Year	Team	Games			Passing								Rushing			
Year	Team	GP	GS	Record	Cmp	Att	Pct	Yds	Y/A	TD	Int	Rtg	Att	Yds	Avg	TD
2022	UNLV	0	0	—	Redshirted (redshirt)											
2023	UNLV	14	11	7–4	224	353	63.5	3,085	8.7	17	10	147.1	73	277	3.8	3
2024	USC	7	4	3–1	101	169	59.8	1,201	7.1	11	6	133.8	20	45	2.3	4
2025	USC	13	13	9–4	265	403	65.8	3,711	9.2	24	10	157.8	54	157	2.9	6
2026	USC	10	10	7–3	224	338	66.3	2,835	8.4	21	8	152.6	26	-71	-2.7	2
Career		43	37	25−12	814	1,263	64.5	10,832	8.6	73	34	150.2	172	417	2.4	15

== Personal life ==
Maiava's uncle, Kaluka Maiava, played linebacker at USC from 2005 to 2008. His great-grandfather is professional wrestler Neff Maiava.

Maiava is of Samoan descent.
