= 2024 Las Vegas Bowl =

Postseason college football bowl game

2024 SRS Distribution Las Vegas Bowl
- 32nd Las Vegas Bowl
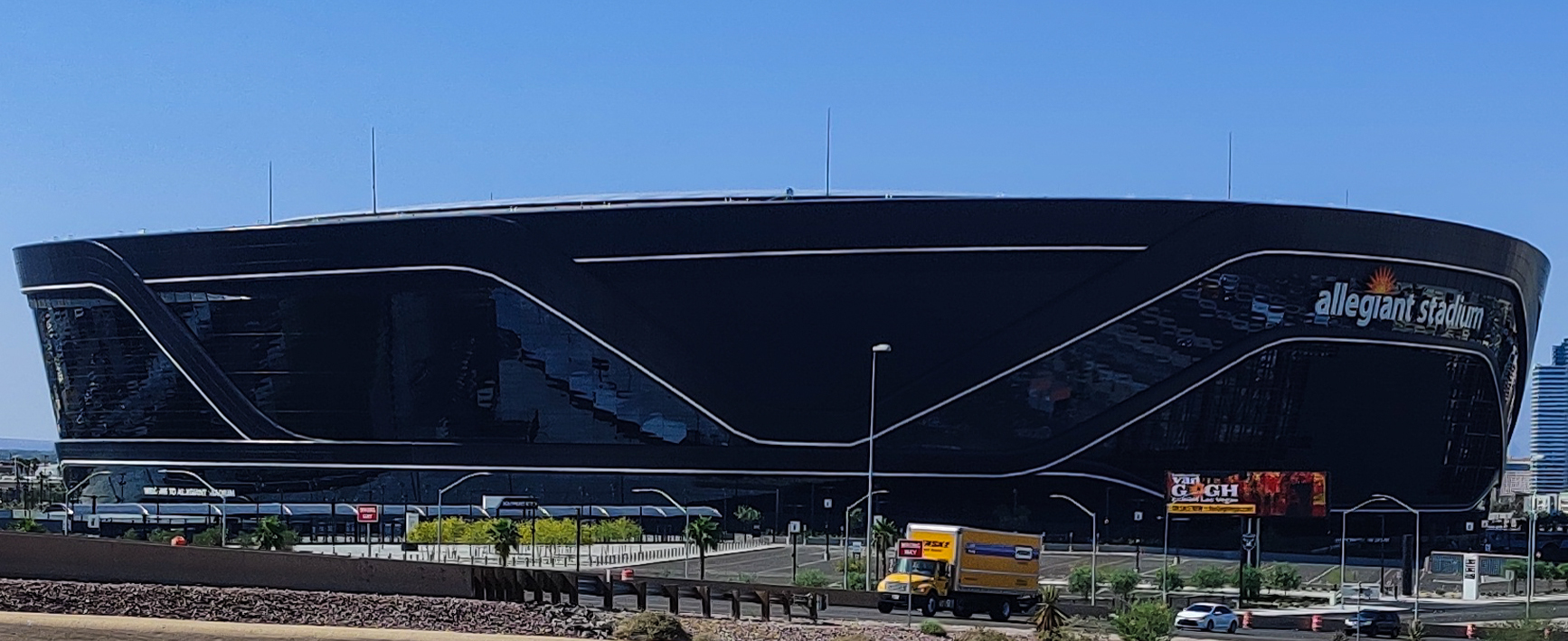
- Allegiant Stadium in Paradise, Nevada, hosted the Las Vegas Bowl.
USC Trojans	Texas A&M Aggies
(6–6)	(8–4)
Big Ten	SEC
35	31
Head coach: Lincoln Riley	Head coach: Mike Elko
	1	2	3	4	Total
USC	0	7	7	21	35
Texas A&M	7	0	17	7	31
- Date: December 27, 2024
- Season: 2024
- Stadium: Allegiant Stadium
- Location: Paradise, Nevada
- MVP: Ja'Kobi Lane (WR, USC)
- Favorite: Texas A&M by 3.5
- Referee: Marcus Woods (ACC)
- Attendance: 26,671

United States TV coverage
- Network: ESPN; ESPN Radio
- Announcers: Dave Flemming (play-by-play), Brock Osweiler (analyst), and Stormy Buonantony (sideline) (ESPN); Roxy Bernstein (play-by-play) and Jordan Reid (analyst) (ESPN Radio)

The 2024 Las Vegas Bowl was a college football bowl game played on December 27, 2024, at Allegiant Stadium located in Paradise, Nevada. The 32nd annual Las Vegas Bowl game featured USC and Texas A&M. The game began at approximately 7:30 p.m. PST and aired on ESPN. The Las Vegas Bowl was one of the 2024–25 bowl games concluding the 2024 FBS football season. The bowl game was sponsored by roofing distribution company SRS Distribution and was officially known as the SRS Distribution Las Vegas Bowl.

== Teams ==
The matchup of USC and Texas A&M was announced on December 8. This was the fourth meeting between the two schools and the third meeting in a bowl game, following the 1975 Liberty Bowl and 1977 Astro-Bluebonnet Bowl; USC had won each of their prior meetings.

=== USC Trojans ===
USC played to a 6–6 record (4–5 in conference) during their regular season. Entering the season ranked 23rd in the nation, they won their first two games but then lost two of their next three to fall out of the rankings. The Trojans faced four ranked opponents, defeating LSU while losing to Michigan, Penn State, and Notre Dame. Midway through the season, quarterback Miller Moss was benched in favor of UNLV transfer Jayden Maiava.

=== Texas A&M Aggies ===
Texas A&M compiled an 8–4 record (5–3 in conference) in regular-season play. The Aggies were ranked nationally for most of the season, as high as 10th when they had a 7–1 record. They fell out of the rankings after losing three of their final four games. Texas A&M faced four ranked teams, defeating Missouri and LSU while losing to Notre Dame and Texas.

== Game summary ==
2024 SRS Distribution Las Vegas Bowl

Quarter	1	2	3	4	Total
USC	0	7	7	21	35
Texas A&M	7	0	17	7	31

at Allegiant Stadium • Paradise, Nevada

- Date: Friday, December 27, 2024
- Game time: 7:40 p.m. PST
- Game weather: Indoor • Temperature: 53 °F (12 °C)
- Game attendance: 26,671
- Referee: Marcus Woods
- TV announcers (ESPN): Dave Flemming (play-by-play), Brock Osweiler (analyst), and Stormy Buonantony (sideline)
- Box score

Game information
First quarter
- TA&M – Noah Thomas 7-yard pass from Marcel Reed (Randy Bond kick), 6:37. Texas A&M 7–0. Drive: 16 plays, 78 yards, 7:07.

Second quarter

- USC – Ja'Kobi Lane 30-yard pass from Jayden Maiava (Michael Lantz kick), 10:16. Tied 7–7. Drive: 8 plays, 74 yards, 3:36.

Third quarter

- TA&M – Noah Thomas 5-yard pass from Marcel Reed (Randy Bond kick), 11:03. Texas A&M 14–7. Drive: 8 plays, 76 yards, 3:57.
- TA&M – Randy Bond 27-yard field goal, 6:12. Texas A&M 17–7. Drive: 8 plays, 74 yards, 3:55.
- TA&M – Jabre Barber 5-yard pass from Marcel Reed (Randy Bond kick), 5:12. Texas A&M 24–7. Drive: 3 plays, 9 yards, 0:43.
- USC – Ja'Kobi Lane 17-yard pass from Jayden Maiava (Michael Lantz kick), 3:42. Texas A&M 24–14. Drive: 3 plays, 71 yards, 1:30.

Fourth quarter

- USC – Bryan Jackson 1-yard run (Michael Lantz kick), 14:24. Texas A&M 24–21. Drive: 8 plays, 66 yards, 2:51.
- USC – Ja'Kobi Lane 15-yard pass from Jayden Maiava (Michael Lantz kick), 4:30. USC 28–24. Drive: 10 plays, 79 yards, 5:32.
- TA&M – Marcel Reed 19-yard run (Randy Bond kick), 1:49. Texas A&M 31–28. Drive: 7 plays, 75 yards, 2:41.
- USC – Kyle Ford 7-yard pass from Jayden Maiava (Michael Lantz kick), 0:08. USC 35–31. Drive: 10 plays, 75 yards, 1:41.

=== Statistics ===
Statistics	USC	TAMU
First downs	25	24
Plays–yards	70–400	72–443
Rushes–yards	31–105	26–42
Passing yards	295	292
Passing: comp–att–int	22–39–3	26–42–2
Time of possession	28:07	31:53

Team	Category	Player	Statistics
USC	Passing	Jayden Maiava	22/39, 295 yards, 4 TD, 3 INT
USC	Rushing	Bryan Jackson	16 carries, 66 yards, TD
USC	Receiving	Ja'Kobi Lane	7 receptions, 127 yards, 3 TD
Texas A&M	Passing	Marcel Reed	26/42, 292 yards, 3 TD, 2 INT
Texas A&M	Rushing	Rueben Owens	13 carries, 56 yards
Texas A&M	Receiving	Jabre Barber	7 receptions, 48 yards, TD
