= Fred Biletnikoff Award =

Award for the outstanding receiver in American college football

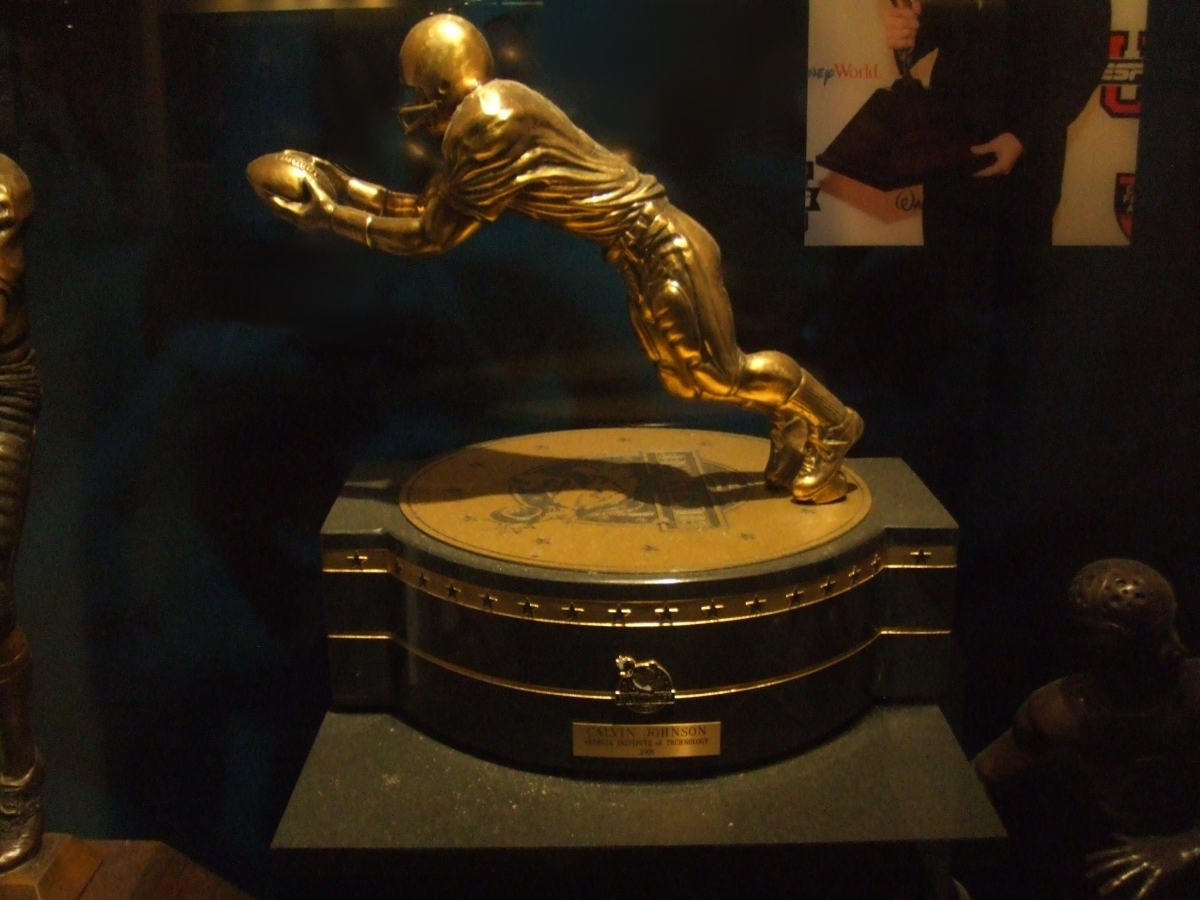
- Awarded for: America's top college football receiver
- Country: United States
- Presented by: Tallahassee Quarterback Club Foundation, Inc.

History
- First award: 1994
- Most recent: Makai Lemon, USC
- Website: http://www.biletnikoffaward.com/

The Fred Biletnikoff Award is presented annually to the most outstanding receiver in American college football by the Tallahassee Quarterback Club Foundation, Inc. (TQCF), an independent not-for-profit 501(c)(3) organization. The award was created in 1994. The award is named for Fred Biletnikoff, who played college football at Florida State and professionally with the Oakland Raiders and Montreal Alouettes. Any NCAA Division I FBS player who catches the football through a forward pass is eligible to be selected as the award winner, though in practice, and as it has been awarded to a player at that position every year, it is considered a de facto honor for the sport's most outstanding wide receiver. The 2025 recipient of the award was University of Southern California’s Makai Lemon.

A national selection committee consisting of over 600 journalists, commentators, broadcasters, and former players selects the award winner. No member of the board of trustees of the foundation has a vote. The foundation's charitable mission is provision of scholarships to North Florida high school seniors who have overcome significant challenges to achieve at the highest levels, with 320 scholarships having been awarded through 2024 with total benefits of well over 5 million dollars.

In December 2022, founding trustee and chairman Walter Manley II and past chairman Mark Ryan announced a goal of $10 million in aggregate to be awarded by 2030.

== Winners ==
Year	Winner	Team	Ref.
1994	Bobby Engram	Penn State	
1995	Terry Glenn	Ohio State	
1996	Marcus Harris	Wyoming	
1997	Randy Moss	Marshall	
1998	Troy Edwards	Louisiana Tech	
1999	Troy Walters	Stanford	
2000	Antonio Bryant	Pittsburgh	
2001	Josh Reed	LSU	
2002	Charles Rogers	Michigan State	
2003	Larry Fitzgerald	Pittsburgh	
2004	Braylon Edwards	Michigan	
2005	Mike Hass	Oregon State	
2006	Calvin Johnson	Georgia Tech	
2007	Michael Crabtree	Texas Tech	
2008	Michael Crabtree (2)	Texas Tech	
2009	Golden Tate	Notre Dame	
2010	Justin Blackmon	Oklahoma State	
2011	Justin Blackmon (2)	Oklahoma State	
2012	Marqise Lee	USC	
2013	Brandin Cooks	Oregon State	
2014	Amari Cooper	Alabama	
2015	Corey Coleman	Baylor	
2016	Dede Westbrook	Oklahoma	
2017	James Washington	Oklahoma State	
2018	Jerry Jeudy	Alabama	
2019	Ja'Marr Chase	LSU	
2020	DeVonta Smith	Alabama	
2021	Jordan Addison	Pittsburgh	
2022	Jalin Hyatt	Tennessee	
2023	Marvin Harrison Jr.	Ohio State	
2024	Travis Hunter	Colorado	
2025	Makai Lemon	USC	
