= Gavin Meyer =

American gridiron football player (born 2002)

No. 97 – Edmonton Elks
- Position: Defensive lineman
- Roster status: Reserve
- CFL status: American

Personal information
- Born: June 8, 2002 (age 24)
- Listed height: 6 ft 3 in (1.91 m)
- Listed weight: 290 lb (132 kg)

Career information
- High school: Franklin (Franklin, Wisconsin)
- College: Wyoming (2020–2023); USC (2024)
- NFL draft: 2025: undrafted

Career history
- Edmonton Elks (2025–present)

Awards and highlights
- Grey Cup champion (2026)
- Stats at CFL.ca

Gavin Meyer (born June 8, 2002) is an American professional football defensive lineman for the Edmonton Elks of the Canadian Football League (CFL). He played college football for the Wyoming Cowboys and USC Trojans.

== Early life ==
Meyer was born on June 8, 2002. He attended Franklin High School in Franklin, Wisconsin. Meyer was a two-time, first-team All-State selection as a junior and senior. Rated as a three-star recruit, he committed to play college football for the University of Wyoming.

== College career ==
Meyer played college football for the Wyoming Cowboys from 2020 to 2023 and USC Trojans in 2024. In 35 games at Wyoming, he had 69 tackles, including 8.5 for loss, four sacks and one forced fumble. Meyer then transferred to the University of Southern California for the 2024 season. In his final year of eligibility, had 32 tackles, one sack and three pass deflections.

== Professional career ==
Pre-draft measurables
Height	Weight	Arm length	Hand span	Wingspan	40-yard dash	10-yard split	20-yard split	20-yard shuttle	Three-cone drill	Vertical jump	Broad jump	Bench press
6 ft 3 in (1.91 m)	285 lb (129 kg)	31 3/8 in (0.80 m)	9 5/8 in (0.24 m)	6 ft 3 in (1.91 m)	4.90 s	1.72 s	2.80 s	4.52 s	7.40 s	27 in (0.69 m)	9 ft 1 in (2.77 m)	27 reps
All values from Pro day

On September 16, 2025, the Edmonton Elks of the Canadian Football League (CFL) signed Meyer to the practice roster. On December 30, he was re-signed by the team. On May 31, 2026, Meyer was assigned to the practice roster. On July 16, he was elevated to the active roster and made his debut the following day against the BC Lions, recording one tackle and an interception. On September 18, he was placed on the 1-game injured list.
