= Kameryn Crawford =

American football player

No. 1 – USC Trojans
- Position: Defensive end
- Class: Junior

Personal information
- Listed height: 6 ft 5 in (1.96 m)
- Listed weight: 265 lb (120 kg)

Career information
- High school: Booker T. Washington (Atlanta, Georgia)
- College: USC (2024–present)
- Stats at ESPN

Kameryn Crawford is an American college football defensive end for the USC Trojans.

== Early life ==
Crawford attended Booker T. Washington High School in Atlanta. As a senior in 2023, he was the Region 6-AA Co-Defensive Player of the Year. Crawford was selected to play in the 2024 Under Armour All-American Game. He committed to the University of Southern California (USC) to play college football.

== College career ==
As a true freshman at USC in 2024, Crawford played in eight games with four starts and had 19 tackles. He returned to USC in 2025 and earned more playing time. During the season, he changed his name from Kameryn Fountain to Kameryn Crawford.
