= Ja'Kobi Lane =

American football player (born 2004)

No. 6 – Baltimore Ravens
- Position: Wide receiver
- Roster status: Active

Personal information
- Born: August 5, 2004 (age 22); Mesa, Arizona, U.S.
- Listed height: 6 ft 4 in (1.93 m)
- Listed weight: 205 lb (93 kg)

Career information
- High school: Red Mountain (Mesa)
- College: USC (2023–2025)
- NFL draft: 2026: 3rd round, 80th overall pick

Career history
- Baltimore Ravens (2026–present)

Awards and highlights
- Third-team All-Big Ten (2025)

Career NFL statistics as of Week 7, 2026
- Receptions: 9
- Receiving yards: 89
- Stats at Pro Football Reference

Ja'Kobi Lane (born August 5, 2004) is an American professional football wide receiver for the Baltimore Ravens of the National Football League (NFL). He played college football for the USC Trojans and was selected by the Ravens in the third round of the 2026 NFL draft.

== Early life ==
Lane was born on August 5, 2004 in Mesa, Arizona. He began playing football in elementary school for his local youth team, the Bears, along with basketball. Ja'Kobi grew up alongside his mother, Megan, who ran a foster home in the Phoenix area. Lane attended Red Mountain High School in Mesa. He had 65 receptions for 823 yards and 11 touchdowns as a senior and 76 receptions for 990 yards and 14 touchdowns as a junior. Lane was named the wide receiver MVP at the 2022 Elite 11. He committed to the University of Southern California (USC) to play college football.

== College career ==
As a true freshman at USC in 2023, Lane played in six games and had seven receptions for 93 yards and two touchdowns, both coming in the 2023 Holiday Bowl. Lane earned more playing time his sophomore year in 2024. He had a career-high 10 receptions for 105 yards and two touchdowns against Wisconsin.

Lane made 11 appearances for USC during the 2025 season, recording 49 receptions for 745 yards and four touchdowns. On December 18, 2025, Lane declared for the 2026 NFL draft.

=== Statistics ===
Year	Team	GP	Receiving			
Year	Team	GP	Rec	Yds	Avg	TD
2023	USC	6	7	93	13.3	2
2024	USC	13	43	525	12.2	12
2025	USC	11	49	745	15.2	4
Career		30	99	1,363	13.8	18

== Professional career ==
Pre-draft measurables
Height	Weight	Arm length	Hand span	Wingspan	40-yard dash	10-yard split	20-yard split	Vertical jump	Broad jump	Bench press
6 ft 4 3/8 in (1.94 m)	200 lb (91 kg)	32 5/8 in (0.83 m)	10 1/2 in (0.27 m)	6 ft 8 3/4 in (2.05 m)	4.47 s	1.58 s	2.61 s	40.0 in (1.02 m)	10 ft 9 in (3.28 m)	11 reps
All values from NFL Combine/Pro Day

Lane was selected by the Baltimore Ravens with the 80th overall pick in the third round of the 2026 NFL draft. He was described by Ravens' general manager Eric DeCosta as a "ball of clay with a lot of upside".

In Week 1, Lane suffered a fractured wrist during the Ravens’ 41–23 win against the Indianapolis Colts. The injury ended his NFL debut, in which he recorded one reception for 11 yards. On October 14, 2026, Lane was activated from injured reserve after missing four games.

== Personal life ==
During his time at Red Mountain High School, Lane was mentored by Todd Heap, a fellow Mesa native and Ring of Honor member for the franchise Ja'Kobi would later go on to be drafted by, the Baltimore Ravens.
