= Akili Arnold =

American gridiron football player (born 2000)

- Arnold with the Toronto Argonauts in 2026

No. 36 – Toronto Argonauts
- Position: Defensive back
- Roster status: Practice roster
- CFL status: American

Personal information
- Born: October 25, 2000 (age 26)
- Listed height: 6 ft 0 in (1.83 m)
- Listed weight: 200 lb (91 kg)

Career information
- High school: Mission Viejo (Mission Viejo, California)
- College: Oregon State (2019–2023); USC (2024)
- NFL draft: 2025: undrafted

Career history
- Toronto Argonauts (2026–present)
- Stats at Pro Football Reference
- Stats at CFL.ca

Akili Arnold (born October 25, 2000) is an American professional football defensive back for the Toronto Argonauts of the Canadian Football League (CFL). He played college football for the Oregon State Beavers and USC Trojans.

== Early life ==
Arnold was born on October 25, 2000. He attended Mission Viejo High School in Mission Viejo, California. Arnold also competed in track and field.

== College career ==
Arnold played college football for the Oregon State Beavers from 2019 to 2023 and USC Trojans in 2024. He played in 50 games at Oregon State, recording 150 tackles, including 5.5 for loss, 0.5 sack, three interceptions, ten pass breakups, two forced fumbles and one fumble recovery. On December 6, 2023, Arnold entered the transfer portal.

On December 17, 2023, Arnold committed to University of Southern California (USC). In his lone year at USC, he had 60 tackles, 0.5 sack, one interception and pass deflection.

== Professional career ==
Pre-draft measurables
Height	Weight	Arm length	Hand span	Wingspan	40-yard dash	10-yard split	20-yard split	20-yard shuttle	Three-cone drill	Vertical jump	Broad jump	Bench press
5 ft 11 in (1.80 m)	196 lb (89 kg)	29 3/4 in (0.76 m)	8 5/8 in (0.22 m)	6 ft 1 1/2 in (1.87 m)	4.71 s	1.64 s	2.72 s	4.24 s	6.90 s	32 1/2 in (0.83 m)	9 ft 5 in (2.87 m)	19 reps
All values from Pro day

After not being selected in the 2025 NFL draft, Miller signed with the Toronto Argonauts of the Canadian Football League (CFL) as an undrafted free agent on February 20, 2026. On May 31, he was released by the team. On August 9, Arnold was re-signed to the practice roster of the Argonauts. He made his CFL debut on September 7, registering one tackle.
