= John Humphrey (American football) =

American football player (born 2002)

Profile
- Position: Cornerback

Personal information
- Born: July 4, 2002 (age 24); Pasadena, California, U.S.
- Listed height: 6 ft 2 in (1.88 m)
- Listed weight: 193 lb (88 kg)

Career information
- High school: John Muir (Pasadena)
- College: UCLA (2020–2023); USC (2024)
- NFL draft: 2025: undrafted

Career history
- Las Vegas Raiders (2025)*
- * Offseason or practice squad member only

John Humphrey (born July 4, 2002) is an American professional football cornerback. He played college football for the UCLA Bruins and USC Trojans.

== Early life ==
Humphrey attended John Muir High School in Pasadena, California. He was rated as a four-star recruit and received offers from Oregon, UCLA, and USC. Ultimately, Humphrey committed to play college football for the UCLA Bruins after receiving an offer just two months prior.

== College career ==
=== UCLA ===
In week 4 of the 2022 season, Humphrey recorded five tackles (one for loss) in his first start in a win over Colorado. From 2020 to 2023, he totaled 76 tackles, five pass deflections, and two interceptions after becoming a full-time starter in 2022. After the season, he entered his name into the NCAA transfer portal.

=== USC ===
Humphrey transferred to play for the USC Trojans. In 2024, he notched 23 tackles, three pass deflections, and an interception in 12 games.

== Professional career ==
Pre-draft measurables
Height	Weight	Arm length	Hand span	40-yard dash	10-yard split	20-yard split	20-yard shuttle	Three-cone drill	Vertical jump	Broad jump	Bench press
6 ft 2 1/4 in (1.89 m)	193 lb (88 kg)	33 1/4 in (0.84 m)	9 1/2 in (0.24 m)	4.54 s	1.56 s	2.68 s	4.23 s	7.33 s	39.0 in (0.99 m)	10 ft 0 in (3.05 m)	9 reps
All values from Pro Day

After not being selected in the 2025 NFL draft, Humphrey signed with the Las Vegas Raiders as an undrafted free agent. He was waived on August 25.
