= Makai Lemon =

American football player (born 2004)

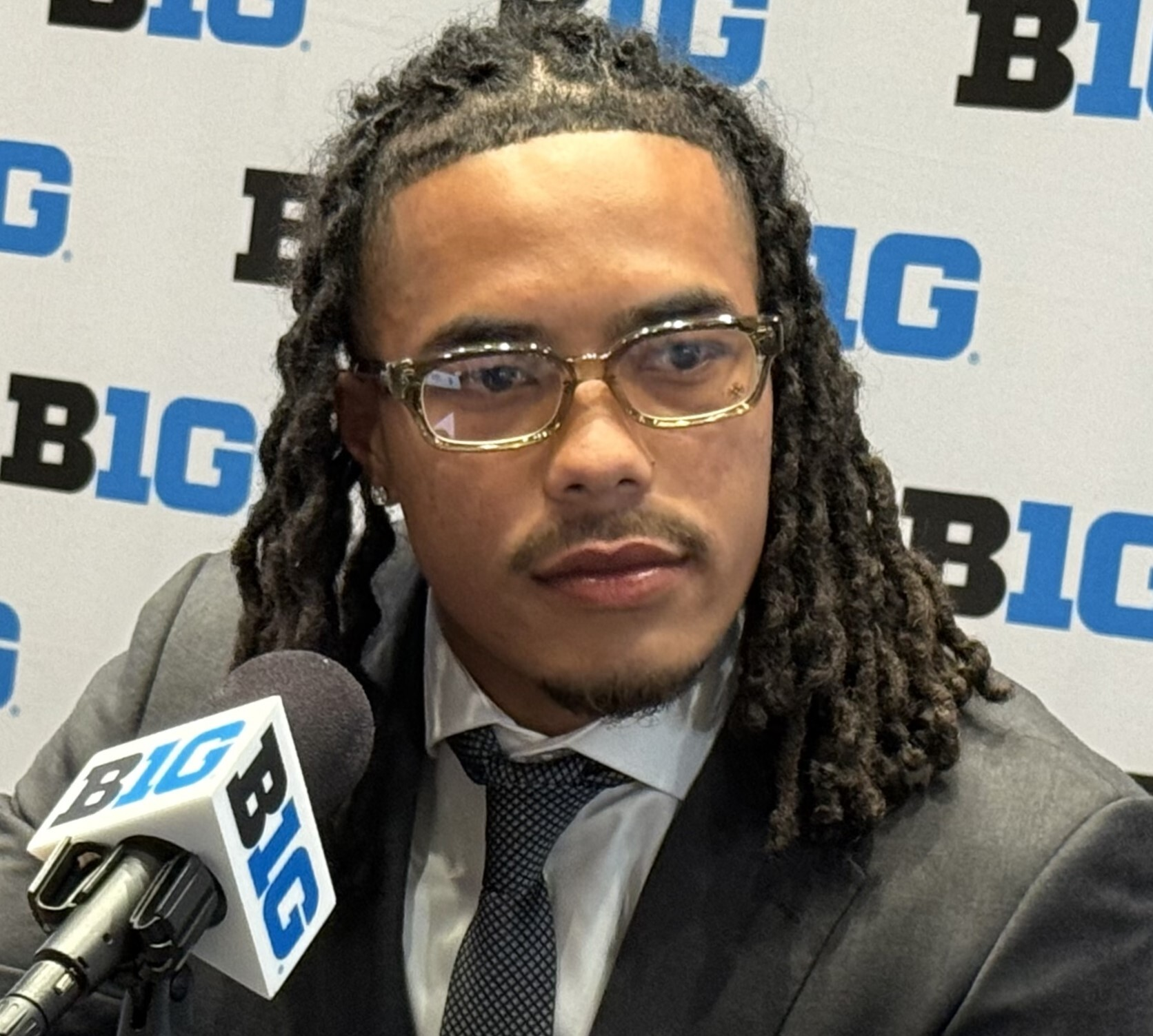
- Lemon in 2025

No. 9 – Philadelphia Eagles
- Position: Wide receiver
- Roster status: Active

Personal information
- Born: June 2, 2004 (age 22); Los Alamitos, California, U.S.
- Listed height: 5 ft 11 in (1.80 m)
- Listed weight: 192 lb (87 kg)

Career information
- High school: Los Alamitos
- College: USC (2023–2025)
- NFL draft: 2026: 1st round, 20th overall pick

Career history
- Philadelphia Eagles (2026–present)

Awards and highlights
- Fred Biletnikoff Award (2025); Unanimous All-American (2025); Polynesian College Football Player of the Year (2025)

Career NFL statistics as of Week 5, 2026
- Receptions: 25
- Receiving yards: 194
- Receiving touchdowns: 1
- Stats at Pro Football Reference

Makai Lemon (born June 2, 2004) is an American professional football wide receiver for the Philadelphia Eagles of the National Football League (NFL). He played college football for the USC Trojans, winning the 2025 Fred Biletnikoff Award, and was selected by the Eagles in the first round of the 2026 NFL draft.

== Early life ==
Lemon was born on June 2, 2004 in Los Alamitos, California. He grew up playing football as a wide receiver and was close friends with quarterback Malachi Nelson, with them playing for the same Pop Warner team and winning a national championship. He initially attended La Mirada High School, where he caught 57 receptions for 784 yards and five touchdowns as a freshman, in addition to four interceptions as a defensive back on defense. He received his first scholarship offer from the Colorado Buffaloes during the first month of his freshman season.

After his freshman season, Lemon transferred to Los Alamitos High School as a sophomore, where he joined Malachi Nelson. In the spring 2021 season, he caught 43 passes for 756 yards and nine touchdowns, being named first-team all-state by MaxPreps. He then recorded 65 receptions for 1,062 yards and 15 touchdowns as a junior in 2021. He was named first-team junior All-American and first-team all-state by MaxPreps. As a senior, he was named first-team All-American and first-team all state after totaling 69 receptions for 1,044 yards and 12 touchdowns.

Lemon was an Under Armour All-American and an invitee to the Polynesian Bowl. He was ranked a five-star recruit and the 13th-best player nationally by ESPN. He initially committed to play college football for the Oklahoma Sooners along with Malachi Nelson. However, he later flipped his commitment along with Nelson to the USC Trojans, after coach Lincoln Riley left the Sooners for the Trojans.

== College career ==
As a freshman at USC in 2023, Lemon saw limited playing time and caught six passes for 88 yards. Towards the end of the season, he played at cornerback as well as wide receiver due to injuries to the Trojans' players. In 2024, Lemon had a breakout game against the Rutgers Scarlet Knights, totaling 256 all-purpose yards while scoring a touchdown. He saw more action as the 2024 season went on and finished as USC's leading receiver with 52 receptions for 764 yards.

Lemon was the recipient of the 2025 Fred Biletnikoff Award, surpassing fellow finalists Skyler Bell of UConn and Jeremiah Smith of Ohio State. He is the second Biletnikoff winner in USC football history, following Marqise Lee in 2012. On December 17, 2025, Lemon declared for the 2026 NFL draft.

== Professional career ==
Pre-draft measurables
Height	Weight	Arm length	Hand span	Wingspan	40-yard dash	10-yard split	20-yard split
5 ft 11 1/8 in (1.81 m)	192 lb (87 kg)	30 1/2 in (0.77 m)	8 3/4 in (0.22 m)	6 ft 1 1/4 in (1.86 m)	4.53 s	1.59 s	2.64 s
All values from NFL Combine/Pro Day

Lemon was selected by the Philadelphia Eagles in the first round, with the 20th overall pick, of the 2026 NFL draft. He was on the phone with Pittsburgh Steelers GM Omar Khan, who planned to draft him with the 21st overall pick, when Philadelphia called to tell him they jumped up to take him at pick 20.

On April 30, Lemon announced at a press conference that he will wear No. 9, becoming the first Eagles player to wear that number since Nick Foles in 2018.

Lemon officially signed a fully guaranteed rookie scale contract for four-years, $20.8 million on May 1.

=== 2026 season ===
See also: 2026 Philadelphia Eagles season

In Week 7 against the Dallas Cowboys, Lemon scored his first career NFL touchdown on a 4-yard reception from Tanner McKee

== Career statistics ==
=== College ===
Legend
**Bold**	Career high

Season	Team	Games		Receiving				Rushing			
Season	Team	GP	GS	Rec	Yds	Avg	TD	Att	Yds	Avg	TD
2023	USC	9	0	6	88	**14.7**	0	—	—	—	—
2024	USC	12	6	52	764	**14.7**	3	—	—	—	—
2025	USC	12	11	**79**	**1,156**	14.6	**11**	**9**	**4**	**0.4**	**2**
Career		33	17	137	2,008	14.7	14	9	4	0.4	2

== Personal life ==
Lemon's family has Native Hawaiian roots. He was named the Polynesian Football Player of the Year for 2025.
