= Jide Abasiri =

American football player (born 2006)

No. 97 – USC Trojans
- Position: Defensive tackle
- Class: Junior

Personal information
- Born: March 10, 2006 (age 20)
- Listed height: 6 ft 5 in (1.96 m)
- Listed weight: 280 lb (127 kg)

Career information
- High school: Prior Lake (Savage, Minnesota)
- College: USC (2024–present)
- Stats at ESPN

Jide Abasiri (born March 10, 2006) is an American college football defensive tackle for the USC Trojans.

== Early life ==
Abasiri attended Prior Lake High School in Savage, Minnesota. As a senior in 2023, he was named the team's defensive lineman of the year and The Minnesota Star Tribune All-Metro First Team after recording 57 tackles and two sacks. He played in the Minnesota High School All-Star Game. He originally committed to play college football at the University of Minnesota before flipping his commitment to the University of Southern California (USC).

== College career ==
Abasiri played in 10 games as a true freshman at USC in 2024, recording seven tackles. As a sophomore in 2025, he started nine of 13 games and had 26 tackles and 3.5 sacks. Abasiri returned to USC as a starter his junior year in 2026.
