= DeCarlos Nicholson =

American football player (born 2001)

Profile
- Position: Cornerback

Personal information
- Born: November 16, 2001 (age 24)
- Listed height: 6 ft 3 in (1.91 m)
- Listed weight: 200 lb (91 kg)

Career information
- High school: Petal (Petal, Mississippi)
- College: Mississippi Gulf Coast CC (2020–2021); Mississippi State (2022–2023); USC (2024–2025)
- NFL draft: 2026: undrafted

Career history
- Cleveland Browns (2026)*; Carolina Panthers (2026)*
- * Offseason or practice squad member only

DeCarlos Nicholson (born November 16, 2001) is an American professional football cornerback. He played college football for the Mississippi Gulf Coast CC Bulldogs, Mississippi State Bulldogs, and USC Trojans.

== Early life ==
Nicholson grew up in Petal, Mississippi and attended Petal High School where he lettered in football, basketball and baseball. In his high school career, Nicholson completed 245 of his 439 pass attempts for 3,450 yards, 30 touchdowns and 11 interceptions. Nicholson would also rush for 984 yards and 11 touchdowns, while also hauling in a receptions for 15 yards. Nicholson was an unranked cornerback recruit and committed to Mississippi Gulf Coast Community College.

== College career ==
=== Mississippi Gulf Coast CC ===
During Nicholson's true freshman season in 2020, he played in all six games as a quarterback, finishing the season with completing 16 out of 36 passing attempts for 178 along with rushing 25 times for 210 yards. During the 2021 season, he converted to a cornerback and played nine games, finishing the season with 19 total tackles (13 solo and six assisted, two tackles for loss for eight yards and 16 pass breakups.

Nicholson would decide to transfer to Mississippi State, but would decommit and commit to Kentucky, but would later decommit and would eventually commit back at Mississippi State.

=== Mississippi State ===
During the 2022 season, Nicholson played in 13 games, finishing the season with five tackles and one pass breakup. During the 2023 season, he played in 12 games and started seven of them, finishing the season with 42 total tackles (17 solo and 25 assisted), two tackles for loss of for four yards and two pass breakups.

On December 7, 2023, Nicholson announced that he would enter the transfer portal.

=== USC ===
On December 20, 2023, Nicholson announced that he will transfer to USC.

== Professional career ==
Pre-draft measurables
Height	Weight	Arm length	Hand span	Wingspan	40-yard dash	10-yard split	20-yard split	20-yard shuttle	Three-cone drill	Vertical jump	Broad jump	Bench press
6 ft 3 1/4 in (1.91 m)	200 lb (91 kg)	33 1/2 in (0.85 m)	9 1/4 in (0.23 m)	6 ft 9 3/4 in (2.08 m)	4.57 s	1.67 s	2.72 s	4.25 s	6.64 s	34.5 in (0.88 m)	11 ft 0 in (3.35 m)	11 reps
All values from Pro Day

=== Cleveland Browns ===
On May 8, 2026, Nicholson signed with the Cleveland Browns as an undrafted free agent. He was waived by Cleveland on May 26 with an injury designation.

=== Carolina Panthers ===
On July 25, 2026, Nicholson signed with the Carolina Panthers. He was waived by Carolina on August 30 as a part of final roster cuts.
