= 2023 USC Trojans football team =

American college football season

2023 USC Trojans football

Holiday Bowl champion

Holiday Bowl, W 42–28 vs. Louisville
- Conference: Pac-12 Conference
- Record: 8–5 (5–4 Pac-12)
- Head coach: Lincoln Riley (2nd season)
- Offensive coordinator: Josh Henson (2nd season)
- Offensive scheme: Air raid
- Defensive coordinator: Alex Grinch (2nd season; first 9 games)
- Co-defensive coordinators: Shaun Nua (interim; remainder of season); Brian Odom (interim; remainder of season)
- Base defense: 3–4
- Captains: Caleb Williams; Justin Dedich; Shane Lee; Jonah Monheim; Mason Cobb
- Home stadium: Los Angeles Memorial Coliseum

Uniform
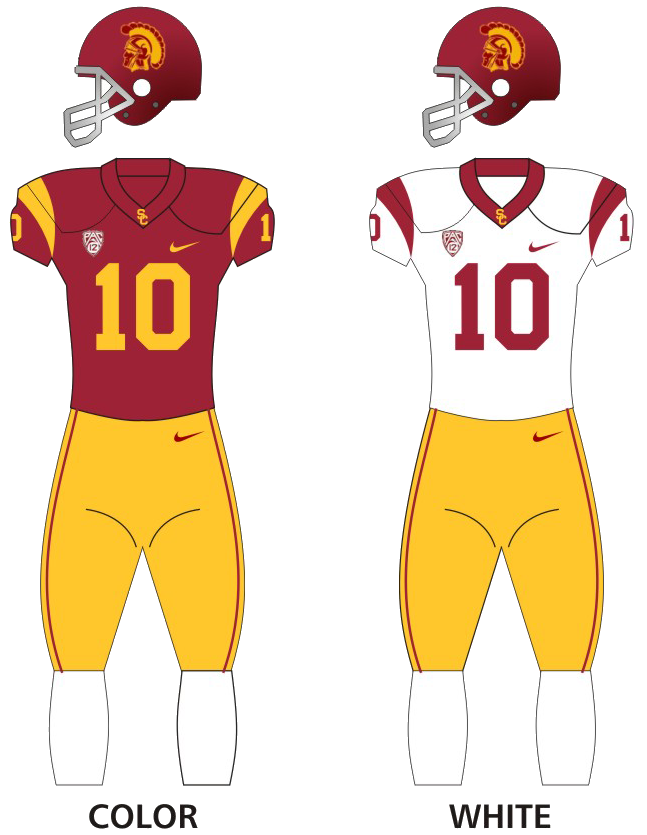

2023 Pac-12 Conference football standings
	Conf.			Overall
Team	W		L	W		L
No. 2 Washington y$^	9	–	0	14	–	1
No. 6 Oregon y	8	–	1	12	–	2
No. 11 Arizona	7	–	2	10	–	3
Oregon State	5	–	4	8	–	5
Utah	5	–	4	8	–	5
USC	5	–	4	8	–	5
California	4	–	5	6	–	7
UCLA	4	–	5	8	–	5
Washington State	2	–	7	5	–	7
Stanford	2	–	7	3	–	9
Arizona State*	2	–	7	3	–	9
Colorado	1	–	8	4	–	8
Championship: Washington 34, Oregon 31
^ – College Football Playoff participant; $ – Conference champion; y – Championship game participant; * – Ineligible for postseason play due to self-imposed ban for 2020 recruiting violations; Rankings from AP Poll

The 2023 USC Trojans football team represented the University of Southern California (USC) as a member of the Pac-12 Conference during the 2023 NCAA Division I FBS football season. In their second year under head coach Lincoln Riley, the Trojans were preseason picks to win the Pac-12 championship, but compiled a 7–5 record (5–4 against conference opponents) during the regular season. The team began the season by winning six consecutive games but lost five of their final six games, including losses to rivals Notre Dame and UCLA. The unranked Trojans defeated No. 16 Louisville in the 2023 Holiday Bowl.

The season was USC's last season as a member of the Pac-12 Conference before joining the Big Ten Conference on July 1, 2024.

The Trojans played their home games at the Los Angeles Memorial Coliseum in Los Angeles. The USC Trojans football team drew an average home attendance of 66,071 in 2023.

== Preseason ==
USC's spring football game was held on April 15, 2023, at the Los Angeles Memorial Coliseum. The defense (white team) defeated the offense (red team) by a 42–34 score.

The Pac-12 Media Day was held on July 21, 2023, in Las Vegas, Nevada. Head coach Lincoln Riley, quarterback Caleb Williams, and linebacker Mason Cobb represented USC at the event. USC was picked to finish first in the conference, receiving 25 out of a possible 36 first-place votes.

== Schedule ==
Date	Time	Opponent	Rank	Site	TV	Result	Attendance
August 26	5:00 p.m.	San Jose State*	No. 6	Los Angeles Memorial Coliseum; Los Angeles, CA	P12N	W 56–28	63,411
September 2	3:30 p.m.	Nevada*	No. 6	Los Angeles Memorial Coliseum; Los Angeles, CA	P12N	W 66–14	62,916
September 9	7:30 p.m.	Stanford	No. 6	Los Angeles Memorial Coliseum; Los Angeles, CA (rivalry)	FOX	W 56–10	67,213
September 23	7:30 p.m.	at Arizona State	No. 5	Mountain America Stadium; Tempe, AZ	FOX	W 42–28	54,166
September 30	9:00 a.m.	at Colorado	No. 8	Folsom Field; Boulder, CO (Big Noon Kickoff)	FOX	W 48–41	54,032
October 7	7:30 p.m.	Arizona	No. 9	Los Angeles Memorial Coliseum; Los Angeles, CA	ESPN	W 43–41 ^{3OT}	62,916
October 14	4:30 p.m.	at No. 21 Notre Dame*	No. 10	Notre Dame Stadium; Notre Dame, IN (rivalry / Big Noon Kickoff)	NBC	L 20–48	77,622
October 21	5:00 p.m.	No. 14 Utah	No. 18	Los Angeles Memorial Coliseum; Los Angeles, CA	FOX	L 32–34	61,551
October 28	1:00 p.m.	at California	No. 24	California Memorial Stadium; Berkeley, CA	P12N	W 50–49	43,716
November 4	4:30 p.m.	No. 5 Washington^{†}	No. 20	Los Angeles Memorial Coliseum; Los Angeles, CA	ABC	L 42–52	72,243
November 11	7:30 p.m.	at No. 6 Oregon		Autzen Stadium; Eugene, OR	FOX	L 27–36	59,957
November 18	12:30 p.m.	UCLA		Los Angeles Memorial Coliseum; Los Angeles, CA (Victory Bell)	ABC	L 20–38	72,243
December 27	5:00 pm	vs. No. 15 Louisville		Petco Park; San Diego, CA (Holiday Bowl)	FOX	W 42–28	35,317
*Non-conference game; ^{†}Homecoming; Rankings from AP Poll (and CFP Rankings, after October 31) - Released prior to game; All times are in Pacific time

== Games summaries ==
=== vs San Jose State ===
San José State Spartans (0–0) vs No. 6 USC Trojans (0–0) – Game summary

Quarter	1	2	3	4	Total
Spartans	0	14	7	7	28
No. 6 Trojans	7	14	21	14	56

at Los Angeles Memorial Coliseum • Los Angeles, CA

- Date: August 26, 2023
- Game time: 5:00 p.m.
- Game weather: Sunny, 82 °F (28 °C)
- Game attendance: 63,411
- Referee: Jeff Dahle
- TV announcers (Pac-12 Network): Ted Robinson (play-by-play), Yogi Roth (analyst)
- Boxscore

Game information

First quarter

- (6:32) USC – Dorian Singer 13-yard pass from Caleb Williams, Denis Lynch kick (Drive: 10 plays, 80 yards, 3:41; USC 7–0)

Second quarter

- (14:12) SJSU – Kairee Robinson 1-yard rush, Kyler Halvorsen kick (Drive: 12 plays, 72 yards, 7:12; Tied 7–7)
- (9:38) USC – Tahj Washington 76-yard pass from Caleb Williams, Denis Lynch kick (Drive: 4 plays, 92 yards, 1:48; USC 14–7)
- (3:31) USC – Austin Jones 2-yard run, Denis Lynch kick (Drive: 10 plays, 52 yards, 4:32; USC 21–7)
- (0:08) SJSU – Nick Nash 28-yard pass from Chevan Cordeiro, Kyler Halvorsen kick (Drive: 4 plays, 46 yards, 0:19; USC 21–14)

Third quarter

- (10:45) USC – Austin Jones 3-yard run, Denis Lynch kick (Drive: 10 plays, 75 yards, 4:15; USC 28–14)
- (6:00) USC – Zachariah Branch 25-yard pass from Caleb Williams, Denis Lynch kick (Drive: 5 plays, 52 yards, 1:35; USC 35–14)
- (1:50) SJSU – Nick Nash 32-yard pass from Chevan Cordeiro, Kyler Halvorsen kick (Drive: 9 plays, 75 yards, 4:10; USC 35–21)
- (1:34) USC – Zachariah Branch 96-yard kickoff return, Denis Lynch kick (Drive: 4 plays, 46 yards, 0:19; USC 42–21)

Fourth quarter

- (12:28) USC – Brenden Rice 12-yard pass from Caleb Williams, Denis Lynch kick (Drive: 6 plays, 55 yards, 2:32; USC 49–21)
- (6:53) USC – Miller Moss 4-yard rush, Denis Lynch kick (Drive: 9 plays, 78 yards, 4:11; USC 56–21)
- (5:08) SJSU – Nick Nash 2-yard pass from Chevan Cordeiro, Kyler Halvorsen kick (Drive: 4 plays, 85 yards, 1:39; USC 56–28)

Statistics	SJSU	USC
First downs	24	25
Total yards	396	501
Rushes/yards	27–198	33–169
Passing yards	198	341
Passing: Comp–Att–Int	21–38–0	24–35–0
Time of possession	30:42	29:18

Team	Category	Player	Statistics
San José State	Passing	Chevan Cordeiro	21/38, 198 yards, 3 TD
San José State	Rushing	Quali Conley	6 carries, 108 yards
San José State	Receiving	Nick Nash	6 receptions, 89 yards, 3 TD
USC	Passing	Caleb Williams	18/25, 278 yards, 4 TD
USC	Rushing	Austin Jones	6 carries, 54 yards, 2 TD
USC	Receiving	Tahj Washington	2 receptions, 85 yards, TD

=== vs Nevada ===
Nevada Wolf Pack (0–0) vs No. 6 USC Trojans (1–0) – Game summary

Quarter	1	2	3	4	Total
Wolf Pack	7	0	0	7	14
No. 6 Trojans	21	14	7	24	66

at Los Angeles Memorial Coliseum • Los Angeles, CA

- Date: September 2, 2023
- Game time: 3:30 p.m.
- Game weather: Temperature: 79 °F (26 °C) • Wind: SE at 6 miles per hour (9.7 km/h) • Weather: Cloudy
- Game attendance: 62,916
- Referee: Christopher Wiggins
- TV announcers (Pac-12 Network): Ted Robinson (play-by-play), Yogi Roth (analyst)

Game information

First quarter

- (12:45) USC – Zachariah Branch 22-yard pass from Caleb Williams, Denis Lynch kick (Drive: 4 plays, 79 yards, 2:10; USC 7–0)
- (11:01) NEV – Sean Dollars 3-yard rush, Brandon Talton kick (Drive: 4 plays, 85 yards, 1:39; Tied 7–7)
- (5:18) USC – MarShawn Lloyd 24-yard rush, Denis Lynch kick (Drive: 4 plays, 54 yards, 2:12; USC 14–7)
- (2:13) USC – Tahj Washington 22-yard pass from Caleb Williams, Denis Lynch kick (Drive: 4 plays, 45 yards, 2:10; USC 21–7)

Second quarter

- (14:08) USC – Michael Jackson III 15-yard pass from Caleb Williams, Denis Lynch kick (Drive: 4 plays, 68 yards, 1:11; USC 28–7)
- (6:17) USC – Brenden Rice 13-yard pass from Caleb Williams, Denis Lynch kick (Drive: 3 plays, 64 yards, 2:17; USC 35–7)

Third quarter

- (10:08) USC – Tahj Washington 45-yard pass from Caleb Williams, Denis Lynch kick (Drive: 7 plays, 67 yards, 2:59; USC 42–7)

Fourth quarter

- (13:30) USC – Denis Lunch 47-yard field goal, (Drive: 10 plays, 79 yards, 4:42; USC 45–7)
- (12:05) USC – Stanley Ta'ufo'ou 23-yard fumble return, Denis Lynch kick (Drive: 3 plays, -2 yards, 1:24; USC 52–7)
- (11:18) NEV – Jamaal Bell 77-yard pass from AJ Bianco, Brandon Talton kick (Drive: 2 plays, 75 yards, 0:47; USC 52–14)
- (9:09) USC – Quinten Joyner 47-yard rush, Denis Lynch kick (Drive: 5 plays, 69 yards, 2:01; USC 59–14)
- (4:02) USC – Duce Robinson 71-yard pass from Miller Moss, Tyler Robles kick (Drive: 2 plays, 68 yards, 0:54; USC 66–14)

Statistics	NEV	USC
First downs	12	28
Total yards	360	668
Rushes/yards	38–49	20–215
Passing yards	311	453
Passing: Comp–Att–Int	22–34–0	25–34–0
Time of possession	35:59	24:01

Team	Category	Player	Statistics
Nevada	Passing	Brendon Lewis	18/29, 182 yards
Nevada	Rushing	Sean Dollars	9 carries, 33 yards, TD
Nevada	Receiving	Jamaal Bell	8 receptions, 121 yards, TD
USC	Passing	Caleb Williams	18/24, 319 yards, 5 TD
USC	Rushing	MarShawn Lloyd	7 carries, 76 yards, TD
USC	Receiving	Tahj Washington	3 receptions, 75 yards, 2 TDs

=== vs Stanford ===
Stanford Cardinal (1–0) vs No. 6 USC Trojans (2–0) – Game summary

Quarter	1	2	3	4	Total
Cardinal	0	3	0	7	10
No. 6 Trojans	21	28	0	7	56

at Los Angeles Memorial Coliseum • Los Angeles, CA

- Date: September 9, 2023
- Game time: 7:30 p.m.
- Game weather: Cloudy, 79 °F (26 °C)
- Game attendance: 67,213
- Referee: Mark Duddy
- TV announcers (FOX): Tim Brando (play-by-play), Spencer Tillman (analyst), Josh Sims (sideline)

Game information

First quarter

- (11:59) USC – Caleb Williams 21-yard rush, Denis Lynch kick (Drive: 8 plays, 75 yards, 3:01; USC 7–0)
- (9:05) USC – MarShawn Lloyd 5-yard rush, Denis Lynch kick (Drive: 3 plays, 19 yards, 1:22; USC 14–0)
- (0:07) USC - Austin Jones 1-yard rush, Denis Lynch kick (Drive: 12 plays, 93 yards, 4:55; USC 21–0)

Second quarter

- (13:43) USC – Zachariah Branch 75-yard punt return, Denis Lynch kick (Drive: 3 plays, -5 yards, 1:17; USC 28–0)
- (10:42) USC – Dorian Singer 19-yard pass from Caleb Williams, Denis Lynch kick (Drive: 5 plays, 55 yards, 2:01; USC 34–0)
- (6:57) STAN – Joshua Karty 38-yard field goal (Drive: 9 plays, 55 yards, 3:45; USC 34–3)
- (6:46) USC – Brenden Rice 75-yard pass from Caleb Williams, Denis Lynch kick (Drive: 1 play, 75 yards, 0:11; USC 41–3)
- (0:10) USC – Lake McRee 1-yard pass from Caleb Williams, Denis Lynch kick (Drive: 7 plays, 80 yards, 3:24; USC 49–3)

Third quarter

None

Fourth quarter

- (3:35) STAN – Justin Lamson 1-yard rush, Joshua Karty kick (Drive: 10 plays, 79 yards, 5:13; USC 49–10)
- (0:58) USC – Miller Moss 15-yard rush, Denis Lynch kick (Drive: 7 plays, 75 yards, 2:37; USC 56–10)

Statistics	STAN	USC
First downs	20	27
Total yards	349	573
Rushes/yards	41–209	28–180
Passing yards	140	393
Passing: Comp–Att–Int	10–25–1	30–36–0
Time of possession	32:08	27:52

Team	Category	Player	Statistics
Stanford	Passing	Justin Lamson	8/18, 121 yards
Stanford	Rushing	Casey Filkins	5 carries, 63 yards
Stanford	Receiving	Benjamin Yurosek	4 receptions, 54 yards
USC	Passing	Caleb Williams	19/21, 281 yards, 3 TD
USC	Rushing	MarShawn Lloyd	9 carries, 77 yards, TD
USC	Receiving	Brenden Rice	1 reception, 75 yards, TD

=== at Arizona State ===
No. 5 USC Trojans (3–0) vs Arizona State Sun Devils (1–2) – Game summary

Quarter	1	2	3	4	Total
No. 5 Trojans	14	7	6	15	42
Sun Devils	7	6	8	7	28

at Mountain America Stadium • Tempe, AZ

- Date: September 23, 2023
- Game time: 7:30 p.m.
- Game weather: Sunny, 79 °F (26 °C)
- Game attendance: 54,166
- Referee: Justin Elliott
- TV announcers (FOX): Tim Brando (play-by-play), Spencer Tillman (analyst), Josh Sims (sideline)

Game information

First quarter

- (8:46) USC – Caleb Williams 1-yard run, Denis Lynch kick (Drive: 12 plays, 75 yards, 6:14; USC 7–0)
- (6:57) ASU – Cameron Skattebo 15-yard run, Dario Longhetto kick (Drive: 3 plays, 15 yards, 1:18; Tied 7–7)
- (1:15) USC – Brenden Rice 43-yard pass from Caleb Williams, Denis Lynch kick (Drive: 9 plays, 87 yards, 5:30; USC 14–7)

Second quarter

- (10:28) ASU – Dario Longhetto 35-yard field goal (Drive: 13 plays, 48 yards, 5:47; USC 14–10)
- (8:29) USC – Caleb Williams 1-yard run, Denis Lynch kick (Drive: 5 plays, 43 yards, 1:57; USC 21–10)
- (2:21) ASU – Dario Longhetto 30-yard field goal (Drive: 13 plays, 64 yards, 6:02; USC 21–13)

Third quarter

- (11:13) USC – Denis Lynch 53-yard field goal (Drive: 7 plays, 28 yards, 2:44; USC 24–13)
- (9:25) ASU – Elijhah Badger 25-yard pass from Drew Pyne, Cameron Skattebo two-point run (Drive: 5 plays, 75 yards, 1:48; USC 24–21)
- (6:29) USC – Denis Lynch 36-yard field goal (Drive: 6 plays, 64 yards, 2:51; USC 27–21)

Fourth quarter

- (10:31) USC – Brenden Rice 29-yard pass from Caleb Williams, Caleb Williams two-point pass to Mario Williams (Drive: 2 plays, 44 yards, 0:54; USC 35–21)
- (8:05) ASU – Cameron Skattebo 52-yard pass from Drew Pyne, Dario Longhetto kick (Drive: 6 plays, 75 yards, 2:26; USC 35–28)
- (7:17) USC – Tahj Washington 45-yard pass from Caleb Williams, Denis Lynch kick (Drive: 3 plays, 75 yards, 0:48; USC 42–28)

Statistics	USC	ASU
First downs	22	22
Total yards	535	353
Rushes/yards	27–217	32–90
Passing yards	322	263
Passing: Comp–Att–Int	20–31–0	23–39–1
Time of possession	28:12	31:48

Team	Category	Player	Statistics
USC	Passing	Caleb Williams	20/31, 322 yards, 3 TD
USC	Rushing	MarShawn Lloyd	14 carries, 154 yards
USC	Receiving	Brenden Rice	7 receptions, 133 yards, 2 TD
Arizona State	Passing	Drew Pyne	21/36, 221 yards, 2 TD, INT
Arizona State	Rushing	Cameron Skattebo	20 carries, 111 yards, TD
Arizona State	Receiving	Elijhah Badger	9 receptions, 81 yards, TD

=== at Colorado ===
No. 8 USC Trojans (4–0) at Colorado Buffaloes (3–1) – Game summary

Quarter	1	2	3	4	Total
No. 8 Trojans	14	20	14	0	48
Buffaloes	0	14	13	14	41

at Folsom Field • Boulder, CO

- Date: September 30, 2023
- Game time: 10:00 a.m. MST
- Game weather: Sunny, 67 °F (19 °C)
- Game attendance: 54,032
- Referee: Cravonne Barrett
- TV announcers (FOX): Gus Johnson (play-by-play), Joel Klatt (analyst), Jenny Taft (sideline reporter)

Game information

First quarter

- (12:33) USC – MarShawn Lloyd 27-yard run, Denis Lynch kick (Drive: 6 plays, 75 yards, 02:27; USC 7–0)
- (2:30) USC – Tahj Washington 71-yard pass from Caleb Williams, Denis Lynch kick (Drive: 3 plays, 77 yards, 00:48; USC 14–0)

Second quarter

- (14:55) USC – Dorian Singer 8-yard pass from Caleb Williams, Denis Lynch kick (Drive: 4 plays, 22 yards, 01:19; USC 21–0)
- (12:59) COL – Jimmy Horn Jr. 30-yard pass from Shedeur Sanders, Alejandro Mata kick (Drive: 7 plays, 75 yards, 01:56; USC 21–7)
- (07:30) USC – Mario Williams 24-yard pass from Caleb Williams (Drive: 2 plays, 23 yards, 00:43; USC 27–7)
- (02:54) USC – Brenden Rice 26-yard pass from Caleb Williams, Denis Lynch kick (Drive: 7 plays, 73 yards, 02:28; USC 34–7)
- (00:21) COL – Shedeur Sanders 25-yard run, Alejandro Mata kick (Drive: 9 plays, 83 yards, 02:28; USC 34–14)

Third quarter

- (07:14) USC – Brenden Rice 6-yard pass from Caleb Williams, Denis Lynch kick (Drive: 7 plays, 55 yards, 02:51; USC 41–14)
- (05:50) COL – Anthony Hankerson 2-yard run, Alejandro Mata kick (Drive: 5 plays, 75 yards, 01:24; USC 41–21)
- (02:14) USC – Jude Wolfe 3-yard pass from Caleb Williams, Denis Lynch kick (Drive: 9 plays, 75 yards, 03:36; USC 48–21)
- (01:03) COL – Michael Harrison 21-yard pass from Shedeur Sanders (Drive: 5 plays, 75 yards, 01:11; USC 48–27)

Fourth quarter

- (11:55) COL – Omarion Miller 9-yard pass from Shedeur Sanders, Alejandro Mata kick (Drive: 11 plays, 61 yards, 03:58; USC 48–34)
- (01:43) COL – Jimmy Horn Jr. 16-yard pass from Shedeur Sanders, Alejandro Mata kick (Drive: 10 plays, 78 yards, 04:15; USC 48–41)

Statistics	USC	COL
First downs	26	32
Total yards	498	564
Rushes/yards	25–95	45–193
Passing yards	403	371
Passing: Comp–Att–Int	30–40–1	30–45–1
Time of possession	27:55	32:05

Team	Category	Player	Statistics
USC	Passing	Caleb Williams	30/40, 403 yards, 6 TD, INT
USC	Rushing	MarShawn Lloyd	13 carries, 88 yards, TD
USC	Receiving	Tahj Washington	8 receptions, 117 yards, TD
Colorado	Passing	Shedeur Sanders	30/45, 371 yards, 4 TD, INT
Colorado	Rushing	Anthony Hankerson	16 carries, 74 yards, TD
Colorado	Receiving	Omarion Miller	7 receptions, 196 yards, TD

=== vs Arizona ===
Arizona Wildcats (3–2) vs No. 9 USC Trojans (5–0) – Game summary

Quarter	1	2	3	4	OT	2OT	3OT	Total
Wildcats	10	7	3	8	7	6	0	41
No. 9 Trojans	0	14	7	7	7	6	2	43

at Los Angeles Memorial Coliseum • Los Angeles, CA

- Date: October 7, 2023
- Game time: 7:30 p.m.
- Game weather: Clear, 71 °F (22 °C)
- Game attendance: 62,916
- Referee: Jeff Dahle
- TV announcers (ESPN): Dave Flemming (play-by-play), Brock Osweiler (analyst), and Kayla Burton (sideline)

Game information

First quarter

- (10:12) ARIZ – Tyler Loop 23-yard field goal (Drive: 8 plays, 60 yards, 3:19; Arizona 3–0)
- (4:59) ARIZ – Jacob Cowing 23-yard pass from Noah Fifita, Tyler Loop kick (Drive: 10 plays, 64 yards, 4:21; Arizona 10–0)

Second quarter

- (13:05) ARIZ – Tanner McLachlan 18-yard pass from Noah Fifita, Tyler Loop kick (Drive: 11 plays, 92 yards, 5:51; Arizona 17–0)
- (9:43) USC – Caleb Williams 3-yard run, Denis Lynch kick (Drive: 2 plays, 12 yards, 1:22; Arizona 17–7)
- (13:05) USC – Kyron Hudson 5-yard pass from Caleb Williams, Denis Lynch kick (Drive: 6 plays, 65 yards, 2:50; Arizona 17–14)

Third quarter

- (10:20) ARIZ – Tyler Loop 22-yard field goal (Drive: 7 plays, 70 yards, 4:40; Arizona 20–14)
- (5:44) USC – MarShawn Lloyd 9-yard run, Denis Lynch kick (Drive: 8 plays, 75 yards, 4:36; USC 21–20)

Fourth quarter

- (12:54) USC – Caleb Williams 1-yard run, Denis Lynch kick (Drive: 11 plays, 76 yards, 5:29; USC 28–20)
- (8:17) ARIZ – Jacob Cowing 3-yard pass from Noah Fifita, Noah Fifita two-point pass to Tetairoa McMillan (Drive: 10 plays, 75 yards, 4:37; Tied 28–28)

First overtime

- USC – Caleb Williams 18-yard run, Denis Lynch kick (Drive: 5 plays, 25 yards; USC 35–28)
- ARIZ – Jacob Cowing 25-yard pass from Noah Fifita, Tyler Loop kick (Drive: 1 play, 25 yards; Tied 35–35)

Second overtime

- ARIZ – Jacob Cowing 8-yard pass from Noah Fifita, two-point pass failed (Drive: 5 plays, 25 yards; Arizona 41–35)
- USC – Austin Jones 11-yard run, two-point pass failed (Drive: 3 plays, 25 yards; Tied 41–41)

Third overtime

- USC - Caleb Williams run for two-point conversion (USC 43-41)

Statistics	ARIZ	USC
First downs	28	23
Total yards	506	365
Rushes/yards	42–203	33–146
Passing yards	303	219
Passing: Comp–Att–Int	25–35–1	14–25–0
Time of possession	35:39	24:21

Team	Category	Player	Statistics
Arizona	Passing	Noah Fifita	25/35 303 yards, 5 TD, INT
Arizona	Rushing	Jonah Coleman	22 carries, 143 yards
Arizona	Receiving	Tetairoa McMillan	6 receptions, 138 yards
USC	Passing	Caleb Williams	14/25 219 yards, TD
USC	Rushing	MarShawn Lloyd	15 carries, 86 yards, TD
USC	Receiving	Brenden Rice	4 receptions, 96 yards

=== at No. 21 Notre Dame ===
No. 10 USC Trojans (6–0) at No. 21 Notre Dame Fighting Irish (5–2) – Game summary

Quarter	1	2	3	4	Total
No. 10 Trojans	3	3	7	7	20
No. 21 Fighting Irish	7	17	7	17	48

at Notre Dame Stadium • Notre Dame, IN

- Date: October 14, 2023
- Game time: 7:30 pm EST
- Game weather: Cloudy, 52 °F (11 °C)
- Game attendance: 77,622
- Referee: Mark Duddy
- TV announcers (NBC): Jac Collinsworth (play-by-play), Jason Garrett (analyst), Zora Stephenson and Amhed Freed (sidelines), and Terry McAulay (rules analyst)

Game information

First quarter

- (11:30) ND – Gi'Bran Payne 4-yard pass from Sam Hartman, Spencer Shrader kick (Drive: 3 plays, 12 yards, 1:23; Notre Dame 7–0)
- (1:13) USC – Denis Lynch 25-yard field goal (Drive: 10 plays, 59 yards, 5:25; Notre Dame 7–3)

Second quarter

- (2:19) ND – Spencer Shrader 26-yard field goal (Drive: 8 plays, 46 yards, 3:48; Notre Dame 10–3)
- (4:14) ND – Audric Estimé 2-yard run, Spencer Shrader kick (Drive: 1 play, 2 yards, 0:03; Notre Dame 17–3)
- (1:30) ND – Audric Estimé 1-yard run, Spencer Shrader kick (Drive: 5 plays, 50 yards, 2:05; Notre Dame 24–3)
- (0:00) USC – Denis Lynch 48-yard field goal (Drive: 8 plays, 44 yards, 1:30; Notre Dame 24–6)

Third quarter

- (7:20) USC – MarShawn Lloyd 31-yard run, Denis Lynch kick (Drive: 6 plays, 57 yards, 3:33; Notre Dame 24–13)
- (3:54) ND – Chris Tyree 46-yard pass from Sam Hartman, Spencer Shrader kick (Drive: 6 plays, 68 yards, 3:20; Notre Dame 31–13)

Fourth quarter

- (9:04) USC – Brenden Rice 7-yard pass from Caleb Williams, Denis Lynch kick (Drive: 5 plays, 18 yards, 3:09; Notre Dame 31–20)
- (8:50) ND – Jadarian Price 99-yard kickoff return, Spencer Shrader kick (Drive: 7 plays, 4 yards, 3:57; Notre Dame 38–20)
- (3:40) ND – Spencer Shrader 23-yard field goal (Drive: 4 plays, 9 yards, 1:09; Notre Dame 41–20)
- (3:27) ND – Xavier Watts 0-yard fumble return, Spencer Shrader kick (Drive: 1 play, -2 yards, 0:09; Notre Dame 48–20)

Statistics	USC	ND
First downs	23	13
Total yards	302	251
Rushes/yards	37–103	29–125
Passing yards	199	126
Passing: Comp–Att–Int	23–37–3	13–20–0
Time of possession	34:35	34:35

Team	Category	Player	Statistics
USC	Passing	Caleb Williams	23/37 199 yards, TD, 3 INT
USC	Rushing	MarShawn Lloyd	8 carries, 46 yards, TD
USC	Receiving	Michael Jackson III	6 receptions, 51 yards
Notre Dame	Passing	Sam Hartman	13/20 126 yards, 2 TD
Notre Dame	Rushing	Audric Estimé	22 carries, 95 yards, 2 TD
Notre Dame	Receiving	Chris Tyree	2 receptions, 61 yards, TD

=== vs No. 14 Utah ===
No. 14 Utah Utes (5–1) vs No. 18 USC Trojans (6–1) – Game summary

Quarter	1	2	3	4	Total
No. 14 Utes	14	0	14	6	34
No. 18 Trojans	14	0	3	15	32

at Los Angeles Memorial Coliseum • Los Angeles, CA

- Date: October 21, 2023
- Game time: 5:00 pm
- Game weather: Sunny, 74 °F (23 °C)
- Game attendance: 61,551
- Referee: Mike McCabe
- TV announcers (FOX): Jason Benetti (play-by-play), Brock Huard (analyst), Allison Williams (sidelines)

Game information

First quarter

Second quarter

Third quarter

Fourth quarter

Statistics	UTAH	USC
First downs	23	18
Total yards	482	401
Rushes/yards	47–248	23–145
Passing yards	235	256
Passing: Comp–Att–Int	14–23–1	35–35–0
Time of possession	34:42	25:18

Team	Category	Player	Statistics
Utah	Passing	Bryson Barnes	14/23 235 yards, 3 TD, INT
Utah	Rushing	Ja'Quinden Jackson	26 carries, 117 yards
Utah	Receiving	Sione Vaki	5 receptions, 149 yards, 2 TD
USC	Passing	Caleb Williams	24/34 256 yards
USC	Rushing	MarShawn Lloyd	7 carries, 86 yards, TD
USC	Receiving	Tahj Washington	5 receptions, 112 yards

=== at California ===
No. 24 USC Trojans (6–2) at California Golden Bears (3–4) – Game summary

Quarter	1	2	3	4	Total
No. 24 Trojans	17	0	12	21	50
Golden Bears	14	14	8	13	49

at California Memorial Stadium • Berkeley, CA

- Date: October 28, 2023
- Game time: 1:00 pm
- Game attendance: 43,716
- Referee: Justin Elliott
- TV announcers (P12N): Ted Robinson (play-by-play), Yogi Roth (analyst)

Game information

First quarter

Second quarter

Third quarter

Fourth quarter

Statistics	USC	CAL
First downs	20	29
Total yards	299	527
Rushes/yards	40-130	42-235
Passing yards	369	292
Passing: Comp–Att–Int	23-40-0	25-39-1
Time of possession	32:36	27:24

Team	Category	Player	Statistics
USC	Passing	Caleb Williams	23-40, 369 yards, 2 TD
USC	Rushing	MarShawn Lloyd	17 carries, 115 yards, 2 TD
USC	Receiving	Tahj Washington	5 receptions, 102 yards
California	Passing	Fernando Mendoza	25-39, 292 yards, 2 TD, INT
California	Rushing	Jaydn Ott	21 carries, 153 yards, 3 TD
California	Receiving	Jeremiah Hunter	8 receptions, 96 yards

=== vs Washington ===
#5 Washington Huskies (8–0) vs #24 USC Trojans (7–2) – Game summary

Quarter	1	2	3	4	Total
Huskies	7	28	7	10	52
Trojans	14	14	14	0	42

at Los Angeles Memorial Coliseum • Los Angeles, CA

- Date: November 4, 2023
- Game time: 4:30 p.m.
- Game weather: Sunny, 73 °F (23 °C)
- Game attendance: 72,243
- Referee: Mark Duddy
- TV announcers (ABC): Chris Fowler, Kirk Herbstreit, Holly Rowe

Game information

First quarter

- (8:56) USC - Raleek Brown 2-yard run, Denis Lynch kick (Drive: 12 plays, 75 yards, 6:04; USC 7-0)
- (3:38) WASH - Dillon Johnson 2-yard run, Grady Gross kick (Drive: 10 plays, 75 yards, 5:18; Tied 7-7)
- (0:35) USC - Caleb Williams 1-yard run, Denis Lynch kick (Drive: 2 plays, 8 yards, 0:49; USC 14-7)

Second quarter

- (11:37) WASH - Devin Culp 22-yard pass from Michael Penix Jr.; Grady Gross kick (Drive: 10 plays, 79 yards, 3;58, Tied 14-14)
- (9:31) USC - Darwin Barlow 1-yard run, Denis Lynch kick (Drive: 5 plays, 95 yards, 2:06; USC 21-14)
- (6:44) WASH - Dillon Johnson 52-yard run, Grady Gross kick (Drive: 5 plays, 75 yards, 2:47; Tied 21-21)
- (4:04) USC - Tahj Washington 41-yard pass from Caleb Williams, Denis Lynch kick (Drive: 5 plays, 75 yards, 2:40; USC 28-21)
- (1:14) WASH - Ja'Lynn Polk 4-yard pass from Michael Penix Jr., Grady Gross kick (Drive: 8 plays, 70 yards, 2:50; Tied 28-28)
- (0:20) WASH - Dillon Johnson 1-yard run, Grady Gross kick (Drive: 3 plays, 12 yards, 0:47; Washington 35-28)

Third quarter

- (8:00) USC - Brenden Rice 25-yard pass from Caleb Williams, Denis Lynch kick (Drive: 8 plays, 80 yards, 3:29; Tied 35-35)
- (4:21) WASH - Michael Penix Jr. 1-yard run, Grady Gross kick (Drive: 7 plays, 75 yards, 3:39; Washington 42-35)
- (1:41) USC - Mario Williams 20-yard pass from Caleb Williams, Denis Lynch kick (Drive: 7 plays, 83 yards, 2:40; Tied 42-42)

Fourth quarter

- (12:25) WASH - Grady Gross 43-yard field goal (Drive: 9 plays, 46 yards, 4:16; Washington 45-42)
- (2:20) WASH - Dillon Johnson 1-yard run, Grady Gross kick (Drive: 9 plays, 91 yards, 5:22; Washington 52-42)

Statistics	WASH	USC
First downs	27	24
Total yards	572	515
Rushes/yards	42-316	27-203
Passing yards	256	312
Passing: Comp–Att–Int	22-30-1	27-36-0
Time of possession	34:40	25:20

Team	Category	Player	Statistics
Washington	Passing	Michael Penix Jr.	22-30 256 yards, 2 TD, INT
Washington	Rushing	Dillon Johnson	26 carries, 256 yards, 4 TD
Washington	Receiving	Rome Odunze	5 receptions, 82 yards
USC	Passing	Caleb Williams	27-35 312 yards, 3 TD
USC	Rushing	Austin Jones	11 carries, 127 yards
USC	Receiving	Tahj Washington	8 receptions, 122 yards, TD

=== at Oregon ===
USC Trojans (7–3) at Oregon Ducks (8–1) – Game summary

Quarter	1	2	3	4	Total
Trojans	7	7	0	13	27
Ducks	13	9	7	7	36

at Autzen Stadium • Eugene, OR

- Date: November 11, 2023
- Game time: 7:30 p.m.
- Game weather: Cloudy, 51 °F (11 °C)
- Game attendance: 59,957
- Referee: Matthew Richards
- TV announcers (FOX): Tim Brando, Spencer Tillman, Josh Sims

Game information

First quarter

Second quarter

Third quarter

Fourth quarter

Statistics	USC	ORE
First downs	21	25
Total yards	379	552
Rushes/yards	25-73	31-140
Passing yards	306	412
Passing: Comp–Att–Int	20-35-0	23-32-0
Time of possession	29:18	30:42

Team	Category	Player	Statistics
USC	Passing	Caleb Williams	19-34 291 yards, TD
USC	Rushing	MarShawn Lloyd	9 carries, 37 yards, TD
USC	Receiving	Tahj Washington	4 receptions, 82 yards
Oregon	Passing	Bo Nix	23-31 412 yards, 4 TD
Oregon	Rushing	Bucky Irving	19 carries, 118 yards, TD
Oregon	Receiving	Troy Franklin	2 receptions, 147 yards, TD

=== vs UCLA (Victory Bell) ===
UCLA Bruins (6–4) vs USC Trojans (7–4) – Game summary

Quarter	1	2	3	4	Total
Bruins	14	0	17	7	38
Trojans	0	10	3	7	20

at Los Angeles Memorial Coliseum • Los Angeles, CA

- Date: November 18, 2023
- Game time: 12:30 pm
- Game weather: Cloudy, 68 °F (20 °C)
- Game attendance: 72,243
- Referee: Mike McCabe
- TV announcers (ABC): Dave Pasch (play-by-play), Dusty Dvoracek (analyst), Tom Luginbill (sideline)

Game information

First quarter

- (9:15) UCLA – T.J. Harden 1-yard run, Blake Glessner kick (Drive: 7 plays, 48 yards, 3:11; UCLA 7–0)
- (2:46) UCLA – Hudson Habermahl 14-yard pass from Ethan Garbers, Blake Glessner kick (Drive: 3 plays, 19 yards, 0:54; UCLA 14–0)

Second quarter

- (14:01) USC – Brenden Rice 74-yard pass from Caleb Williams, Denis Lynch kick (Drive: 7 plays, 99 yards, 2:03; UCLA 14–7)
- (0:02) USC – Denis Lynch 14-yard field goal (Drive: 9 plays, 51 yards, 0:49; UCLA 14–10)

Third quarter

- (9:45) UCLA – T.J. Harden 7-yard pass from Ethan Garbers, Blake Glessner kick (Drive: 15 plays, 65 yards, 5:15; UCLA 21–10)
- (9:29 UCLA – Alex Johnson 11-yard fumble recovery return, Blake Glessner kick (UCLA 28–10)
- (3:51) USC – Denis Lynch 34-yard field goal (Drive: 9 plays, 30 yards, 5:32; UCLA 28–13)
- (1:21) UCLA – Blake Glessner 35-yard field goal (Drive: 10 plays, 38 yards, 2:24; UCLA 31–13)

Fourth quarter

- (9:06) UCLA – Hudson Habermahl 15-yard pass from Ethan Garbers, Blake Glessner kick (Drive: 10 plays, 38 yards, 5:01; UCLA 38–13)
- (3:52) USC – Austion Jones 17-yard run, Denis Lynch kick (Drive: 11 plays, 75 yards, 5:14; UCLA 38–20)

Statistics	UCLA	USC
First downs	19	17
Total yards	354	387
Rushes/yards	45–199	22–3
Passing yards	155	384
Passing: Comp–Att–Int	18–31–0	31–44–1
Time of possession	32:34	27:26

Team	Category	Player	Statistics
UCLA	Passing	Ethan Garbers	18/31, 155 yards, 3 TD
UCLA	Rushing	T.J. Harden	22 carries, 142 yards, TD
UCLA	Receiving	Logan Loya	9 receptions, 60 yards
USC	Passing	Caleb Williams	31/42, 384 yards, TD, INT
USC	Rushing	MarShawn Lloyd	8 carries, 17 yards
USC	Receiving	Brenden Rice	8 receptions, 147 yards, TD

=== vs Louisville (Holiday Bowl) ===
2023 DirectTV Holiday Bowl
No. 15 Louisville Cardinals (10-3, 7-1) vs USC Trojans (7-5, 5-4) – Game summary

Quarter	1	2	3	4	Total
No. 15 Cardinals	7	7	7	7	28
Trojans	7	21	7	7	42

at Petco Park • San Diego, California

- Date: December 27th, 2023
- Game time: 5:00 p.m.
- Game weather: Clear • Temperature: 61 °F (16 °C) • Wind: 5 mph (8.0 km/h) NW
- Game attendance: 35,317
- Referee: Lee Hedrick
- TV announcers (FOX): Gus Johnson (play-by-play), Joel Klatt (analyst), and Jenny Taft (sideline)

Game information

First quarter

- (8:37) LOU – Isaac Guerendo 2-yard run, Nick Lopez kick (Drive: 10 plays, 71 yards, 5:10; Louisville 7–0)
- (4:25) USC – Tahj Washington 17-yard pass from Miller Moss, Denis Lynch kick (Drive: 3 plays, 19 yards, 1:33; Tied 7–7)

Second quarter

- (8:07) USC – Tahj Washington 29-yard pass from Miller Moss, Denis Lynch kick (Drive: 5 plays, 80 yards, 2:13; USC 14–7)
- (6:30) USC – Kyron Hudson 9-yard pass from Miller Moss, Denis Lynch kick (Drive: 2 plays, 18 yards, 0:39; USC 21–7)
- (1:56) LOU – Evan Conley 9-yard run, Nick Lopez kick (Drive: 9 plays, 73 yards, 4:34; USC 21–14)
- (0:19) USC – Ja'Kobi Lane 31-yard pass from Miller Moss, Denis Lynch kick (Drive: 3 plays, 34 yards, 1:15; USC 28–14)

Third quarter

- (9:43) LOU – Isaac Guerendo 1-yard run, Nick Lopez kick (Drive: 6 plays, 39 yards, 2:41; USC 28–21)
- (4:51) USC – Ja'Kobi Lane 12-yard pass from Miller Moss, Denis Lynch kick (Drive: 11 plays, 53 yards, 4:52; USC 35–21)

Fourth quarter

- (12:51) LOU – Isaac Guerendo 2-yard run, Nick Lopez kick (Drive: 12 plays, 72 yards, 7:00; USC 35–28)
- (10:00) USC – Duce Robinson 44-yard pass from Miller Moss, Denis Lynch kick (Drive: 7 plays, 75 yards, 2:51; USC 42–28)

Statistics	Louisville	USC
First downs	22	19
Total yards	361	443
Rushes/yards	45–220	19–71
Passing yards	141	372
Passing: Comp–Att–Int	21–25–0	23–33–1
Time of possession	36:34	23:26

Team	Category	Player	Statistics
Louisville	Passing	Jack Plummer	21/25, 141 yards
Louisville	Rushing	Isaac Guerendo	23 carries, 161 yards, 3 TD
Louisville	Receiving	Isaac Guerendo	5 receptions, 42 yards
USC	Passing	Miller Moss	23/33, 372 yards, 6 TD, INT
USC	Rushing	Austin Jones	11 carries, 60 yards
USC	Receiving	Tahj Washington	7 receptions, 99 yards, 2 TD

== Personnel ==
=== Roster and coaching staff ===
2023 USC Trojans football team roster
Players
Coaches
Offense

Pos.	#	Name	Class
RB	0	MarShawn Lloyd	Jr
WR	1	Zachariah Branch	Fr
WR	2	Brenden Rice	Sr
WR	4	Mario Williams	Jr
RB	6	Austin Jones	Sr
QB	7	Miller Moss	So
QB	8	Malachi Nelson	Fr
WR	9	Michael Jackson III	Jr
WR	10	Kyron Hudson	So
QB	13	Caleb Williams (C)	Jr
WR	14	Raleek Brown	So
WR	15	Dorian Singer	Jr
WR	16	Tahj Washington	Sr
QB	17	Jake Jensen	So
TE	18	Jude Wolfe	Sr
WR	19	Duce Robinson	Fr
RB	21	Quinten Joyner	Fr
RB	22	Darwin Barlow	Sr
WR	24	Makai Lemon	Fr
RB	27	A'Marion Peterson	Fr
QB	28	Gage Roy	So
QB	31	Isaac Ward	Jr
RB	34	Matt Colombo	Jr
WR	40	Ty Shamblin	Jr
WR	44	Josiah Zamora	So
WR	46	Corey Nerhus	Jr
OL	52	Jarrett Kingston	Sr
OL	56	Andres Dewerk	Jr
OL	57	Justin Dedich (C)	Sr
OL	59	Micah Banuelos	Fr
OL	61	Jack Susnjar	Fr
OL	62	Cooper Lovelace	Sr
OL	65	Grant Tucker	Sr
OL	66	Gino Quinones	Sr
OL	67	Kilian O'Connor	So
OL	70	Emmanuel Pregnon	Jr
OL	71	Michael Tarquin	Sr
OL	72	Elijah Paige	Fr
OL	73	Tobias Raymond	Fr
OL	75	Amos Talalele	Fr
OL	76	Mason Murphy	So
OL	77	Alani Noa	Fr
OL	78	Andrew Milek	Jr
OL	79	Jonah Monheim (C)	Jr
TE	84	Carson Tabaracci	Fr
WR	85	Jaden Moore	Fr
TE	86	CJ Woods	Jr
TE	87	Lake McRee	So
TE	88	Kade Eldridge	Fr
WR	89	Ja'Kobi Lane	Fr
TE	95	Luke Otte	So

Defense

Pos.	#	Name	Class
DL	0	Korey Foreman	Jr
CB	1	Domani Jackson	So
RUSH	2	Romello Height	Jr
S	4	Max Williams	Sr
DL	6	Anthony Lucas	So
S	7	Calen Bullock	Jr
S	8	Zion Branch	Fr
ILB	9	Raesjon Davis	Jr
RUSH	10	Jamil Muhammad	Sr
ILB	13	Mason Cobb (C)	Sr
CB	14	Jacobe Covington	Jr
S	15	Anthony Beavers Jr.	So
CB	16	Prophet Brown	So
CB	17	Christian Roland-Wallace	Sr
ILB	18	Eric Gentry	Jr
S	19	Jaylin Smith	Jr
CB	22	Ceyair Wright	So
CB	23	Tre'Quon Fegans	Fr
S	24	Christian Pierce	Fr
ILB	25	Tackett Curtis	Fr
CB	26	Fabian Ross	So
S	27	Bryson Shaw	Sr
S	28	Xamarion Gordon	So
CB	29	Maliki Crawford	Fr
ILB	30	Chris Thompson Jr.	Sr
DL	31	Tyrone Taleni	Sr
RUSH	34	Braylan Shelby	Fr
RUSH	35	DJ Peevy	Fr
DL	37	Devan Thompkins	Fr
RUSH	39	Garrett Pomerantz	So
CB	40	L Simpson	Jr
ILB	41	Garrison Madden	Fr
ILB	42	Deuce Palmer	Sr
RUSH	44	Sam Greene	Fr
DL	47	Stanley Ta'ufo'ou	Sr
S	48	Daniel Jimenez-Fulton	So
RUSH	51	Solomon Byrd	Sr
ILB	52	Theo Bravos	Jr
ILB	53	Shane Lee (C)	Sr
DL	56	Elijah Hughes	Fr
ILB	57	Roman Marchetti	So
DL	58	Solomon Tuliaupupu	Sr
DL	79	De'jon Benton	Sr
DL	90	Bear Alexander	So
DL	91	Deijon Laffitte	Fr
DL	92	Kyon Barrs	Sr
DL	93	Sinjun Astani	Sr
DL	94	Kobe Pepe	Jr
DL	99	Jack Sullivan	Sr

Special teams

Pos.	#	Name	Class
P	35	Michael McAllister	Jr
P	36	Will Rose	Sr
P, K	37	Eddie Czaplicki	Jr
LS	39	Jac Casasante	Sr
P	42	Aadyn Sleep-Dalton	Sr
K	46	Denis Lynch	So
LS	48	Daniel Meunier	Sr
LS	53	Nathan Weneta	Jr
K	95	Tyler Robles	Fr
K, P	98	Garth White	Jr

Head coach

- Lincoln Riley

Coordinators/assistant coaches

- Josh Henson – Offensive coordinator/offensive line
- Alex Grinch – Defensive coordinator/safeties
- Dennis Simmons – Assistant head coach/passing game coordinator/outside wide receivers
- Zach Hanson – Tight ends
- Luke Huard – Inside wide receivers
- Kiel McDonald – Running backs
- Shaun Nua – Defensive line
- Brian Odom – Inside linebackers
- Roy Manning – Outside linebackers/nickels
- Donte Williams – Defensive backs/defensive pass game coordinator
- Bennie Wylie – Director, Strength & Conditioning
- Kliff Kingsbury – Offensive analyst
- Greg Brown – Defensive analyst
- Derek Fa'avi – Defensive analyst
- Parker Henry – Defensive analyst
- Taylor Mays – Defensive analyst
- Bookie Radley-Hiles – Defensive analyst
- Ryan Dougherty – Special teams analyst/Assistant special teams coordinator
- Zach Crabtree – Graduate assistant
- Will Johnson – Graduate assistant
- Peyton Pelluer – Graduate assistant
- Trey Tinsley – Graduate assistant

Legend

- (C) Team captain
- (S) Suspended
- (I) Ineligible
- Injured
- Redshirt

Roster
Last update: 09/04/23

=== Depth chart ===
Defense
4-3

FS
Max Williams OR
Bryson Shaw
Zion Branch

Nickel	MIKE	WILL	RUSH
Jaylin Smith	Mason Cobb	Tackett Curtis	Anthony Lucas OR
Christian Roland-Wallace*	Eric Gentry	Shane Lee	Jamil Muhammad OR
Christian Pierce*	-	Raesjon Davis	Braylan Shelby

SS
Calen Bullock
Anthony Beavers Jr.
Christian Pierce*

CB
Ceyair Wright
Christian Roland-Wallace*
Prophet Brown

DE	NT	DE
Jack Sullivan OR	Kyon Barrs OR	Solomon Byrd
Stanley Ta’ufo’ou	Bear Alexander OR De'jon Benton	Romello Height
Elijah Hughes	Tyrone Taleni	Korey Foreman

CB
Domani Jackson
Jacobe Covington
-

Offense
Pro-style

WR
Kyron Hudson OR
Brenden Rice
Duce Robinson

WR
Dorian Singer
Makai Lemon
Ja'Kobi Lane

LT	LG	C	RG	RT
Jonah Monheim	Emmanuel Pregnon OR	Justin Dedich	Jarrett Kingston	Michael Tarquin
Elijah Paige	Alani Noa	Kilian O'Connor	-	Mason Murphy
-	-	-	-	-

TE
Lake McRee
Jude Wolfe
Carson Tabaracci

WR
Mario Williams
Tahj Washington
Zachariah Branch / Raleek Brown

QB
Caleb Williams
Miller Moss
Malachi Nelson

Key reserves
Offense
QB Jake Jensen
RB A'Marion Peterson
WR Michael Jackson III
TE Kade Eldridge
OL Andrew Milek
OL Andres Dewerk
OL Cooper Lovelace
OL Micah Bañuelos
OL Amos Talalele
OL Tobias Raymond
Defense
DL Kobe Pepe
DL Deven Thompkins
DL Deijon Laffitte
RUSH DJ Peevy
RUSH Sam Greene
LB Garrison Madden
LB Chris Thompson Jr.
CB Tre'Quon Fegans
CB Maliki Crawford
CB Fabian Ross
S Xamarion Gordon
Special teams
K K Garth White
P Aadyn Sleep-Dalton
LS Nick Weneta
Out (indefinitely)
Out (season)
DL Solomon Tuliaupupu
OL Gino Quinones
Out (suspended)
Out (retired)

RB
Austin Jones OR
MarShawn Lloyd
Darwin Barlow
Quinten Joyner

Special teams
PK Denis Lynch
PK -
P P Eddie Czaplicki
P -
KR -
PR -
LS Jac Casasante
H Will Rose

True Freshman
Double Position : *
official Depth Chart Week 0 vs San José State (08/26/2023)

=== Injury report ===
Name	Position	Class	Injury	Duration
Solomon Tuliaupupu	DL	(redshirt) Senior	Lower leg	Season
Gino Quinones	OL	(redshirt) Senior	Lower leg	Season
Zion Branch	S	(redshirt) Freshman	Knee	Season

=== Scholarship distribution chart ===
Position/Year	Freshman (26)	Sophomore (15)	Junior (18)	Senior (25)	2024 commit (18)	2025/2026 commit (4)
QB 4 (1)	Malachi Nelson	Miller Moss; Jake Jensen	Caleb Williams	-	-	Julian Lewis
RB 6 (1)	Quinten Joyner; A’Marion Peterson	Raleek Brown	MarShawn Lloyd	^Darwin Barlow; Austin Jones	Bryan Jackson	-
WR 9 (3)	Zachariah Branch; Ja’Kobi Lane; Makai Lemon	Kyron Hudson	Michael Jackson III; Dorian Singer; Mario Williams	^Brenden Rice^Tahj Washington	Xavier Jordan; Ryan Pellum	Ja’Myron Baker
TE 6 (2) H-Back	Duce Robinson; Kade Eldridge; Walker Lyons; Carson Tabaracci	Lake McRee	-	^Jude Wolfe	Walter Matthews; Joey Olsen	-
OL 15 (4)	Micah Bañuelos; Alani Noa; Elijah Paige; Tobias Raymond; Amos Talalele	Mason Murphy	Andres Dewerk; Andrew Milek; Jonah Monheim; Emmanuel Pregnon	Justin Dedich; Jarrett Kingston^Cooper Lovelace^Gino Quinones^Michael Tarquin	Makai Saina; Justin Tauanuu; Hayden Treter; Jason Zandamela	-
DL 13 (1)	Elijah Hughes; Deijon Laffitte; Devan Thompkins	Bear Alexander; Anthony Lucas	Korey Foreman; Kobe Pepe	Kyon Barrs^De’jon Benton; Jack Sullivan; Tyrone Taleni^Stanley Ta’ufo’ou; Solomon Tuliaupupu	Jide Abasiri	-
RUSH 6 (1)	Sam Greene; DJ Peevy; Braylan Shelby	-	Romello Height	Solomon Byrd^Jamil Muhammad	Kameryn Fountain	-
ILB 7 (2)	Tackett Curtis; Garrison Madden	-	Raesjon Davis; Eric Gentry	^Mason Cobb; Shane Lee^Chris Thompson Jr.	Elijah Newby; Desman Stephens II	-
DB 16 (6)	Zion Branch; Maliki Crawford; Tre’Quon Fegans; Christian Pierce	Anthony Beavers Jr. Prophet Brown; Xamarion Gordon; Domani Jackson; Fabian Ross; Ceyair Wright	Calen Bullock; Jacobe Covington; Jaylin Smith	Christian Roland-Wallace^Bryson Shaw^Max Williams	Jarvis Boatwright Jr. Braylon Conley; Marquis Gallegos; Isaiah Rubin; Marcelles Williams	Brandon Lockhart
SP 3 (-)	-	Denis Lynch	Eddie Czaplicki	Aadyn Sleep-Dalton	–	-
ATH (1)	x	x	x	x	-	Madden Riordan

- Projected Scholarship Distribution 2023 chart

^ : the players who still have to make an official choice and the players who are eligible for the Covid year.

redshirt year used / redshirt year eligible / * Former Walk-on / LDS Mission

– 84 players on scholarship (+ 1 LDS Mission) / 85 scholarships permitted

=== Coaching staff departures ===
Name	Position	New Team	New Position
Conner McQueen	Offensive graduate assistant / offensive skill	Incarnate Word	Offensive coordinator / quarterbacks coach
Austin Woods	Senior Defensive analyst / assistant defensive line	Incarnate Word	Offensive line coach / run game coordinator
Bryan Kegans	Associate Director of football sports performance	North Texas	Director of strength and conditioning
Brad Aoki	Quarterback	Colorado State	Offensive graduate assistant
Will Harriger	Senior Offensive analyst / assistant quarterbacks / game management coordinator / NFL liaison	Dallas Cowboys (NFL)	Offensive assistant
Lenny Vandermade	Offensive quality control analyst	St. Ignatius College Prep football (High School)	Head coach – varsity team
Parker Henry	Defensive analyst / assistant linebackers	Portland State	Special teams coordinator / linebackers coach

=== Coaching staff additions ===
Name	Position	Old team	Old position
Adam Thackery	Assistant director of football sports performance	Mississippi State Baseball	Strength & conditioning coach
Trey Tinsley	Offensive graduate assistant	Mississippi State	Offensive quality control
Bookie Radley-Hiles	Defensive analyst	Cincinnati Bengals (NFL)	Player
Derek Fa'avi	Offensive analyst	Hawaii	Director of player development
Greg Brown	Senior defensive analyst	Charlotte	Defensive coordinator
Kliff Kingsbury	Senior offensive analyst	Arizona Cardinals (NFL)	Head coach
Bryson Allen-Williams	Defensive quality control	North Carolina	Defensive graduate assistant

=== Transfers ===
==== Transfers out ====
The Trojans have lost 23 players via transfer.

Name	Pos.	Height	Weight	Year	Hometown	New school
Keegan Patterson	QB	6’0	185	Sophomore	Longmont, CO	Northwest Mississippi CC / Indiana State
Gary Bryant Jr.	WR	5’11	180	Junior	Riverside, CA	Oregon
Kyle Ford	WR	6’3	220	(redshirt) Junior	Corona, CA	UCLA
John Jackson III	WR	6’1	215	Senior	Redondo Beach, CA	Nevada
Jake Smith	WR	6’0	200	Junior	Scottsdale, AZ	Arizona State
C. J. Williams	WR	6’2	190	Freshman	Santa Ana, CA	Wisconsin
Malcolm Epps	TE	6’6	250	(redshirt) Senior	Houston, TX	Pitt
Joe Bryson	OT	6’8	300	(redshirt) Senior	Castle Pines, CO	Incarnate Word
Courtland Ford	OT	6’6	305	(redshirt) Junior	Cedar Hill, TX	Kentucky
Maximus Gibbs	OL	6’7	390	Freshman	Norwalk, CA	Jackson State
Jason Rodriguez	OT	6’5	310	(redshirt) Senior	Oak Hills, CA	Nevada
Earl Barquet Jr.	DL	6’2	275	(redshirt) Senior	Marrero, LA	University of Louisiana - Monroe
Jamar Sekona	DL	6’2	295	(redshirt) Sophomore	Fairfax, CA	-
Colin Mobley	DL	6’4	290	(redshirt) Freshman	Washington, D.C.	-
Ralen Goforth	ILB	6’2	225	Senior	Long Beach, CA	Washington
Tayler Katoa	ILB	6’2	240	(redshirt) Senior	Layton, UT	-
Tuasivi Nomura	ILB	6’1	230	(redshirt) Junior	Corona, CA	Fresno State
Julien Simon	ILB	6’1	230	(redshirt) Freshman	Tacoma, WA	Tulsa
Xavion Alford	DB	6’0	190	(redshirt) Sophomore	Pearland, TX	Arizona State
Briton Allen	DB	6’0	190	(redshirt) Junior	Orlando, FL	Utah
Joshua Jackson Jr.	CB	6’1	185	(redshirt) Junior	Westminster, CA	-
Latrell McCutchin	DB	6’1	190	Sophomore	Austin, TX	Houston
Jayden Williams	CB	6'1	195	Junior	East Riverside, CA	Miami (OH)

==== Transfers in ====
The Trojans have added 16 players via transfer. According to 247 Sports, USC had the No. 2 ranked transfer class in the country.

Name	Pos.	Height	Weight	Year	Hometown	Old school
MarShawn Lloyd	RB	5’9	212	(redshirt) Sophomore	Wilmington, DE	South Carolina
Dorian Singer	WR	6’1	185	Sophomore	Saint Paul, MN	Arizona
CJ Woods	TE	6’2	240	(redshirt) Sophomore	Long Beach, CA	Cal Poly
Jarrett Kingston	OT	6’5	302	(redshirt) Junior	Anderson, CA	Washington State
Michael Tarquin	OT	6’5	320	(redshirt) Sophomore	Ocala, FL	Florida
Emmanuel Pregnon	OL	6’6	318	(redshirt) Freshman	Denver, CO	Wyoming
Bear Alexander	DL	6’3	305	Freshman	Terrell, TX	Georgia
Kyon Barrs	DL	6’3	285	Junior	Murrieta, CA	Arizona
Anthony Lucas	DL	6’6	270	Freshman	Scottsdale, AZ	Texas A&M
Jack Sullivan	DL	6’5	275	(redshirt) Senior	Plainfield, IL	Purdue
Jamil Muhammad	OLB	6’2	245	(redshirt) Junior	Madison, AL	Georgia State
Mason Cobb	ILB	6’0	230	Junior	Provo, UT	Oklahoma State
Deuce Palmer	ILB	6’2	215	(redshirt) Junior	Danville	SMU
Tre'Quon Fegans	DB	6’2	190	Freshman	Alabaster, AL	Alabama
Christian Roland-Wallace	CB	6’0	198	Junior	Palmadale, CA	Arizona
Edward Czaplicki	P/K	6’1	200	Sophomore	Charlotte, NC	Arizona State

=== Entered NFL draft ===
Player	Position	Drafted by
Jordan Addison	WR	Minnesota Vikings
Tuli Tuipulotu	OLB	Los Angeles Chargers
Mekhi Blackmon	CB	Minnesota Vikings
Andrew Vorhees	OG	Baltimore Ravens

=== Returning starters ===
Offense

Player	Position	Games started
Caleb Williams	Quarterback	14 games
Austin Jones	Running back	4 games
Brenden Rice	Wide receiver	12 games
Tahj Washington	Wide receiver	11 games
Mario Williams	Wide receiver	9 games
Michael Jackson III	Wide receiver	2 games
Lake McRee	Tight end	2 games
Jonah Monheim	Offensive tackle	14 games
Justin Dedich	Offensive guard	13 games
Mason Murphy	Offensive tackle	5 games
Gino Quinones	Offensive guard	2 games

Defense

Player	Position	Games started
Stanley Ta’ufo’ou	Defensive line	13 games
Tyrone Taleni	Defensive line	9 games
Solomon Byrd	Defensive line	4 games
De’jon Benton	Defensive line	3 games
Romello Height	Rush	2 games
Shane Lee	Linebacker	12 games
Eric Gentry	Linebacker	9 games
Calen Bullock	Defensive back	14 games
Max Williams	Defensive back	13 games
Ceyair Wright	Defensive back	11 games
Jaylin Smith	Defensive back	9 games
Bryson Shaw	Defensive back	5 games
Jacobe Covington	Defensive back	3 games

Special teams

Player	Position	Games started
Aadyn Sleep-Dalton	Punter	12 games
Denis Lynch	Kicker	14 games

=== Recruiting class ===
USC signed 22 players in the 2023 recruiting cycle. Eight USC signees were ranked in the ESPN 300 top prospect list. The Trojans finished ranked eighth by 247Sports. In addition to bringing in a Top 5 transfer portal class. USC added 5 walk-ons during the national signing period.

College recruiting (2023)
Name	Hometown	School	Height	Weight	Commit date
Zachariah Branch #1 WR #4 nat.	Las Vegas, NV	Bishop Gorman HS	5 ft 10 in (1.78 m)	172 lb (78 kg)	December 24, 2021 (Committed) / December 21, 2022 (Signed)
Zachariah Branch #1 WR #4 nat.	Recruit ratings: Rivals: 247Sports: On3: ESPN:				
Malachi Nelson #5 QB #12 nat.	Los Alamitos, CA	Los Alamitos HS	6 ft 3 in (1.91 m)	181 lb (82 kg)	November 30, 2021 (Committed) / December 21, 2022 (Signed)
Malachi Nelson #5 QB #12 nat.	Recruit ratings: Rivals: 247Sports: On3: ESPN:				
Duce Robinson #1 TE #17 nat.	Phoenix, AZ	Pinnacle High School	6 ft 6 in (1.98 m)	225 lb (102 kg)	March 30, 2023 (Committed) / March 30, 2023 (Signed)
Duce Robinson #1 TE #17 nat.	Recruit ratings: Rivals: 247Sports: On3: ESPN:				
Makai Lemon #7 WR #43 nat.	Los Alamitos, CA	Los Alamitos HS	6 ft 0 in (1.83 m)	180 lb (82 kg)	December 3, 2021 (Committed) / December 21, 2022 (Signed)
Makai Lemon #7 WR #43 nat.	Recruit ratings: Rivals: 247Sports: On3: ESPN:				
Braylan Shelby #15 EDGE #85 nat.	Friendswood, TX	Friendswood HS	6 ft 5 in (1.96 m)	235 lb (107 kg)	August 6, 2022 (Committed) / December 21, 2022 (Signed)
Braylan Shelby #15 EDGE #85 nat.	Recruit ratings: Rivals: 247Sports: On3: ESPN:				
Tackett Curtis #9 LB #108 nat.	Many, LA	Many HS	6 ft 2 in (1.88 m)	224 lb (102 kg)	July 18, 2022 (Committed) / December 21, 2022 (Signed)
Tackett Curtis #9 LB #108 nat.	Recruit ratings: Rivals: 247Sports: On3: ESPN:				
Walker Lyons #5 TE #123 nat.	Folsom, CA	Folsom HS	6 ft 4 in (1.93 m)	230 lb (100 kg)	February 1, 2023 (Committed) / February 1, 2023 (Signed)
Walker Lyons #5 TE #123 nat.	Recruit ratings: Rivals: 247Sports: On3: ESPN:				
Quinten Joyner #13 RB #185 nat.	Manor, TX	Manor HS	5 ft 11 in (1.80 m)	203 lb (92 kg)	April 19, 2022 (Committed) / December 21, 2022 (Signed)
Quinten Joyner #13 RB #185 nat.	Recruit ratings: Rivals: 247Sports: On3: ESPN:				
Elijah Paige #18 OT #220 nat.	Phoenix, AZ	Pinnacle HS	6 ft 7 in (2.01 m)	304 lb (138 kg)	October 3, 2022 (Committed) / December 21, 2022 (Signed)
Elijah Paige #18 OT #220 nat.	Recruit ratings: Rivals: 247Sports: On3: ESPN:				
Maliki Crawford #34 CB #327 nat.	Oxnard, CA	Pacifica HS	6 ft 4 in (1.93 m)	180 lb (82 kg)	August 2, 2022 (Committed) / December 21, 2022 (Signed)
Maliki Crawford #34 CB #327 nat.	Recruit ratings: Rivals: 247Sports: On3: ESPN:				
A'marion Peterson #24 RB #365 nat.	Wichita Falls, TX	Hirschi HS	6 ft 0 in (1.83 m)	200 lb (91 kg)	April 24, 2022 (Committed) / December 21, 2022 (Signed)
A'marion Peterson #24 RB #365 nat.	Recruit ratings: Rivals: 247Sports: On3: ESPN:				
Ja'Kobi Lane #58 WR #392 nat.	Mesa, AZ	Red Mountain HS	6 ft 4 in (1.93 m)	175 lb (79 kg)	August 26, 2022 (Committed) / February 1, 2023 (Signed)
Ja'Kobi Lane #58 WR #392 nat.	Recruit ratings: Rivals: 247Sports: On3: ESPN:				
Christian Pierce #41 S #423 nat.	Rancho Cucamonga, CA	Rancho Cucamonga HS	6 ft 2 in (1.88 m)	180 lb (82 kg)	May 1, 2022 (Committed) / December 21, 2022 (Signed)
Christian Pierce #41 S #423 nat.	Recruit ratings: Rivals: 247Sports: On3: ESPN:				
Amos Talele #38 IOL #463 nat.	Santa Clara, CA	Santa Clara HS	6 ft 5 in (1.96 m)	330 lb (150 kg)	June 20, 2022 (Committed) / December 21, 2022 (Signed)
Amos Talele #38 IOL #463 nat.	Recruit ratings: Rivals: 247Sports: On3: ESPN:				
David Peevy #45 EDGE #463 nat.	San Diego, CA	Lincoln HS	6 ft 4 in (1.93 m)	230 lb (100 kg)	October 27, 2022 (Committed) / December 21, 2022 (Signed)
David Peevy #45 EDGE #463 nat.	Recruit ratings: Rivals: 247Sports: On3: ESPN:				
Sam Greene #52 DL #477 nat.	Baltimore, MD	St. Frances Academy	6 ft 1 in (1.85 m)	265 lb (120 kg)	September 15, 2022 (Committed) / December 21, 2022 (Signed)
Sam Greene #52 DL #477 nat.	Recruit ratings: Rivals: 247Sports: On3: ESPN:				
Micah Bañuelos #39 IOL #486 nat.	Burien, WA	Kennedy Catholic HS	6 ft 3 in (1.91 m)	290 lb (130 kg)	July 25, 2022 (Committed) / December 21, 2022 (Signed)
Micah Bañuelos #39 IOL #486 nat.	Recruit ratings: Rivals: 247Sports: On3: ESPN:				
Alani Noa #45 IOL #539 nat.	Sacramento, CA	Grant Union HS	6 ft 4 in (1.93 m)	320 lb (150 kg)	August 16, 2022 (Committed) / December 21, 2022 (Signed)
Alani Noa #45 IOL #539 nat.	Recruit ratings: Rivals: 247Sports: On3: ESPN:				
Kade Eldridge #36 ATH (TE) #581 nat.	Lynden, WA	Lynden Christian School	6 ft 5 in (1.96 m)	235 lb (107 kg)	June 22, 2022 (Committed) / December 21, 2022 (Signed)
Kade Eldridge #36 ATH (TE) #581 nat.	Recruit ratings: Rivals: 247Sports: On3: ESPN:				
Tobias Raymond #58 OT #802 nat.	Ventura, CA	Ventura HS	6 ft 7 in (2.01 m)	270 lb (120 kg)	June 13, 2022 (Committed) / December 21, 2022 (Signed)
Tobias Raymond #58 OT #802 nat.	Recruit ratings: Rivals: 247Sports: On3: ESPN:				
Deijon Laffitte #93 DL #869 nat.	Ontario, CA	Colony HS	6 ft 3 in (1.91 m)	285 lb (129 kg)	September 22, 2022 (Committed) / December 21, 2022 (Signed)
Deijon Laffitte #93 DL #869 nat.	Recruit ratings: Rivals: 247Sports: On3: ESPN:				
Elijah Hughes #102 DL #911 nat.	Arlington, VA	Washington-Liberty HS	6 ft 3 in (1.91 m)	265 lb (120 kg)	December 17, 2022 (Committed) / December 21, 2022 (Signed)
Elijah Hughes #102 DL #911 nat.	Recruit ratings: Rivals: 247Sports: On3: ESPN:				
Overall recruit ranking:
Note: In many cases, Scout, Rivals, 247Sports, On3, and ESPN may conflict in their listings of height and weight.; In these cases, the average was taken. ESPN grades are on a 100-point scale.; Sources: "2023 USC Football Commitments". Rivals.; "2023 Player Commitments – USC". ESPN.; "2023 Team Ranking". Rivals.com.; "USC 2023 Football Commitments". 247Sports.

*= 247Sports Composite rating; ratings are out of 1.00. (five stars= 1.00–.98, four stars= .97–.90, three stars= .80–.89, two stars= .79–.70, no stars= <70)
†= Despite being rated as a four and five star recruit by ESPN, On3.com, Rivals.com and 247Sports.com, Malachi Nelson and Zachariah Branch received a five star 247Sports Composite rating.
Δ= Left the USC program following signing but prior to the 2023 season.

2023 overall class rankings

Website	National rank	Conference rank	5 star recruits	4 star recruits	3 star recruits	2 star recruits	1 star recruits	No star ranking
ESPN	10	2	3	6	13	0	0	0
On3 Recruits	9	2	3	8	11	0	0	0
Rivals	7	1	3	8	11	0	0	0
247 Sports	8	1	3	10	9	0	0	0

=== Walk-ons ===
Name	Pos.	Height	Weight	Hometown	High school
Kaylon Miller	DL	6’1	250	Calabasas, CA	Calabasas HS
Jack Susnjar	OL	6’6	325	Los Angeles, CA	Loyola HS
Tyler Robles	K	5’7	165	Encinitas, CA	La Costa Canyon HS
Jaden Moore	WR	6’0	180	La Jolla, CA	The Bishop’s School

=== Award watch lists ===
Listed in the order that they were released

Award	Player	Position	Year	Source
Lott Trophy	Calen Bullock	S	Jr.	
Lott Trophy	Mason Cobb	LB	Jr.	
Biletnikoff Award	Dorian Singer	WR	Jr.	
Biletnikoff Award	Tahj Washington	WR	rSr.	
Outland Trophy	Justin Dedich	OL	rSr.	
Outland Trophy	Jarrett Kingston	OL	rSr.	
Rotary Lombardi Award	Justin Dedich	OL	rSr.	
Rotary Lombardi Award	Jonah Monheim	OL	rJr.	
Maxwell Award	Caleb Williams	QB	Jr.	
Davey O'Brien Award	Caleb Williams	QB	Jr.	
Walter Camp Award	Caleb Williams	QB	Jr.	
Manning Award	Caleb Williams	QB	Jr.	
Johnny Unitas Golden Arm Award	Caleb Williams	QB	Jr.	
Bronko Nagurski Trophy	Calen Bullock	S	Jr.	
Jim Thorpe Award	Calen Bullock	S	Jr.	
Bednarik Award	Calen Bullock	S	Jr.	
Butkus Award	Mason Cobb	LB	Jr.	
Ray Guy Award	Eddie Czaplicki	P	Jr.	
Paul Hornung Award	Tahj Washington	WR	rSr.	
Wuerffel Trophy	Justin Dedich	OL	rSr.	
Rimington Trophy	Justin Dedich	OL	rSr.	
Doak Walker Award	Austin Jones	RB	rSr.	
Polynesian College Football Player Of The Year Award	Stanley Ta’ufo’ou	DL	rSr.	
Polynesian College Football Player Of The Year Award	Tyrone Taleni	DL	rSr.	
Polynesian College Football Player Of The Year Award	Mason Cobb	LB	Jr.	

=== Preseason All-Pac-12 teams and All-American honors ===
First team

Position	Player	Class
Team
QB	Caleb Williams	Jr.
WR	Dorian Singer	Jr.
DB	Calen Bullock	Jr.
P	Eddie Czaplicki	Jr.
AP	Raleek Brown	So.

Second team

Position	Player	Class
OL	Justin Dedich	RS Sr.
OL	Jonah Monheim	RS Jr.
OL	Jarrett Kingston	RS Jr.
LB	Mason Cobb	Jr.
LB	Eric Gentry	Jr.

All-Pac-12 Honorable Mention

Position	Player	Class
DL	Bear Alexander	So.
DL	Kyon Barrs	RS Sr.
RS	Raleek Brown	So.
RB	Austin Jones	RS Sr.
LB	Shane Lee	RS Sr.
DB	Christian Roland-Wallace	RS Sr.

Pre-season All-American Honors
Player	Position	AP	AS	CBS Sports	ESPN	PFF	Sporting News	WCFF	Designation
Calen Bullock	S			✓		✓	✓		
Caleb Williams	QB	✓	✓	✓	✓	✓	✓	✓	Unanimous

Second Team All-Americans
Player	No.	Position	Class	Selector(s)	Source(s)
Calen Bullock	7	S	Jr.	AP	
Dorian Singer	15	WR	Jr.	AS, SN	

== Rankings ==
Ranking movements Legend: ██ Increase in ranking ██ Decrease in ranking — = Not ranked RV = Received votes
	Week															
Poll	Pre	1	2	3	4	5	6	7	8	9	10	11	12	13	14	Final
AP	6	6	5	5	8	9	10	18	24	24	RV	RV	—			
Coaches	6	6	5	5	6	7	9	16	22	22	RV	RV	—			
CFP	Not released									20	—	—	—			Not released

== Statistics ==
=== Team ===
	USC	Opp
Points per game	59.33	17.33
Total	178	52
First downs	80	56
Rushing	26	21
Passing	52	24
Penalty	2	11
Rushing yards	555	456
Avg per play	6.8	4.3
Avg per game	185.0	152.0
Rushing touchdowns	9	3
Passing yards	1187	649
Att-Comp-Int	105-79-0	98-53-1
Avg per pass	11.30	6.62
Avg per game	395.67	216.33
Passing touchdowns	13	4
Total offense	1742	1105
Avg per play	9.3	5.4
Avg per game	580.7	368.3
Fumbles-Lost	3-1	8-3
Penalties-Yards	24-217	12-110
Avg per game	72.33	36.67
Punts-Yards	9-379	20-899
Avg per punt	42.11	44.95
Time of possession/Game	1:21:11	1:38:49
3rd down conversions	53.57%	31.11%
4th down conversions	66.67%	40%
Sacks-Yards	66.67%	33.33%
Touchdowns scored	25	7
Field goals-Attempts	1-1	1-3
PAT-Attempts	25-25	7-7
Red Zone Attempts-Score	15-15	5-6
Red Zone TD	14	4
Attendance	193,540	
Games/Avg per Game	64,513	
Neutral Site		

=== Individual Leaders ===
==== Offense ====
Passing statistics
#	NAME	POS	RAT	CMP	ATT	YDS	AVG/G	CMP%	TD	INT	LONG
7	Miller Moss	QB	163.30	23	32	309	103.0	71.88%	1	0	71
8	Malachi Nelson	QB	33.33	1	3	0	0	33.33	0	0	0
13	Caleb Williams	QB	240.50	55	70	878	292.67	78.57%	12	0	76
	TOTALS		211.06	79	105	1,187	395.67	75.24 %	13	0	76

Rushing statistics
#	NAME	POS	ATT	GAIN	AVG	TD	LONG	AVG/G
0	MarShawn Lloyd	RB	25	195	7.8	2	30	65
6	Austin Jones	RB	14	106	7.6	3	37	35.33
21	Quinten Joyner	RB	14	113	8.1	1	47	37.67
22	Darwin Barlow	RB	6	37	6.2	0	23	12.33
27	A’Marion Peterson	RB	2	14	7.0	0	9	7.0
44	Matt Colombo	RB	1	7	7.0	0	7	2.33
	Team		3	–7	–2.3	0	0	–2.3
1	Zachariah Branch	WR	2	14	7.0	0	9	4.67
4	Mario Williams	WR	1	–4	–4	0	0	–1.33
7	Miller Moss	QB	2	19	9.5	2	15	6.33
13	Caleb Williams	QB	12	61	5.1	1	46	20.33
	TOTALS		82	555	6.8	9	47	185.0

Receiving statistics
#	NAME	POS	CTH	YDS	AVG	TD	LONG	AVG/G
1	Zachariah Branch	WR	9	110	12.22	2	25	36.67
2	Brenden Rice	WR	5	124	24.80	3	75	41.33
4	Mario Williams	WR	10	111	11.1	0	29	37
9	Michael Jackson III	WR	2	19	9.5	1	15	9.5
10	Kyron Hudson	WR	3	42	14.0	0	20	14.0
14	Raleek Brown	WR/RB	1	14	14.0	0	14	14.0
15	Dorian Singer	WR	8	119	14.88	2	30	39.67
16	Tahj Washington	WR	9	233	25.89	3	76	77.67
19	Duce Robinson	WR/TE	8	186	23.25	1	71	62.0
24	Makai Lemon	WR	4	13	3.25	0	6	6.5
44	Josiah Zamora	WR	2	11	5.5	0	6	11.0
89	Ja'Kobi Lane	WR	3	28	9.33	0	12	9.33
87	Lake McRee	TE	8	75	9.38	1	22	25.0
0	MarShawn Lloyd	RB	3	71	23.67	0	54	23.67
21	Quinten Joyner	RB	1	7	7.0	0	7	2.33
22	Darwin Barlow	RB	1	10	10.0	0	10.0	3.33
	TOTALS		79	1,187	15.03	13	76	395.67

==== Defense ====
Defense statistics
#	NAME	POS	SOLO	AST	TOT	TFL-YDS	SACK-YDS	INT-YDS	BU	QBH	FR-YDS	FF	BLK	SAF	TD
0	Korey Foreman	DL	–	1	1	–	–	–	–	–	–	–	–	–	–
6	Anthony Lucas	DL	4	1	5	3.0–7	–	–	–	–	–	–	–	–	–
37	Devan Thompkins	DL	–	1	1	–	–	–	–	–	–	–	–	–	–
47	Stanley Ta’ufo’ou	DL	3	–	3	–	–	–	–	–	1–23	–	–	–	1
56	Elijah Hughes	DL	2	1	3	1.0–2	–	–	–	–	–	–	–	–	–
79	De’jon Benton	DL	4	–	4	1.0–7	1.0–7	–	–	–	–	–	–	–	–
90	Bear Alexander	DL	3	4	7	1.0–12	0.5–11	–	2	–	–	–	–	–	–
92	Kyon Barrs	DL	1	1	2	–	–	–	–	–	–	–	–	–	–
94	Kobe Pepe	DL	–	3	3	–	–	–	–	–	–	–	–	–	–
2	Romello Height	RUSH	3	2	5	1.0–2	–	–	–	–	–	–	–	–	–
10	Jamil Muhammad	RUSH	5	2	7	2.0–5	2.0–5	–	1	1	–	2	–	–	–
34	Braylan Shelby	RUSH	4	1	5	2.0–10	1.0–9	–	–	–	–	1	–	–	–
44	Sam Greene	RUSH	–	1	1	–	–	–	–	–	–	–	–	–	–
51	Solomon Byrd	DL	6	3	9	4.5–29	2.5–24	–	–	–	–	2	–	–	–
9	Raesjon Davis	LB	2	3	5	–	–	–	–	1	–	–	–	–	–
13	Mason Cobb	LB	5	1	6	2.0–7	–	–	–	–	–	–	–	–	–
18	Eric Gentry	LB	2	2	4	1.0–1	–	–	1	–	–	–	–	–	–
25	Tackett Curtis	LB	2	5	7	–	–	–	1	–	1–2	–	–	–	–
30	Chris Thompson Jr.	LB	1	1	2	–	–	–	–	–	–	–	–	–	–
42	Deuce Palmer	LB	1	–	1	–	–	–	–	–	–	–	–	–	–
53	Shane Lee	LB	7	5	12	1.0–13	1.0–13	–	–	–	–	–	–	–	–
1	Domani Jackson	CB	9	2	11	–	–	–	2	–	–	–	–	–	–
14	Jacobe Covington	CB	2	1	3	–	–	–	–	–	–	–	–	–	–
17	Christian Roland-Wallace	CB	4	2	6	–	–	–	1	–	–	–	–	–	–
22	Ceyair Wright	CB	6	–	6	1.0–1	–	–	1	–	–	–	–	–	–
4	Max Williams	S	8	1	9	2.0–10	–	1–39	1	–	–	–	–	–	–
7	Calen Bullock	S	10	2	12	–	–	–	4	–	–	–	–	–	–
8	Zion Branch	S	5	2	7	1.0–12	–	–	–	–	–	1	–	–	–
15	Anthony Beavers Jr.	S	2	2	4	–	–	–	–	–	1–0	–	–	–	–
19	Jaylin Smith	S	18	2	20	3.5–14	–	–	–	–	–	–	–	–	–
24	Christian Pierce	S	2	–	2	–	–	–	–	–	–	–	–	–	–
27	Bryson Shaw	S	10	–	10	–	–	–	–	–	–	–	–	–	–
	Team		3	–	3	–	–	–	–	–	–	–	–	–	–
	TOTAL		134	52	186	27.0–132	8.0–69	1–39	14	2	3–25	6	–	–	1

Key: POS: Position, SOLO: Solo Tackles, AST: Assisted Tackles, TOT: Total Tackles, TFL: Tackles-for-loss, SACK: Quarterback Sacks, INT: Interceptions, BU: Passes Broken Up, PD: Passes Defended, QBH: Quarterback Hits, FR: Fumbles Recovered, FF: Forced Fumbles, BLK: Kicks or Punts Blocked, SAF: Safeties, TD : Touchdown

==== Special teams ====
Kicking statistics
#	NAME	POS	XPM	XPA	XP%	FGM	FGA	FG%	1–19	20–29	30–39	40–49	50+	LNG
46	Denis Lynch	K	24	24	100%	1	1	100%	0/0	0/0	1/1	0/0	0/0	37
95	Tyler Robles	K	1	1	100%	0	0	0	0/0	0/0	0/0	0/0	0/0	0
	TOTALS		25	25	100%	1	1	100%	0/0	0/0	1/1	0/0	0/0	37

Kickoff statistics
#	NAME	POS	KICKS	YDS	AVG	TB	OB
37	Eddie Czaplicki	P	19	1,195	62.9	8	0
46	Denis Lynch	K	10	604	60.4	2	1
	TOTALS		29	1,799	62.0	10	1

Punting statistics
#	NAME	POS	PUNTS	YDS	AVG	LONG	TB	FC	I–20	50+	BLK
37	Eddie Czaplicki	P	9	379	42.11	49	0	8	4	0	0
	TOTALS		9	379	42.11	49	0	8	4	0	0

Kick return statistics
#	NAME	POS	RTNS	YDS	AVG	TD	LNG
1	Zachariah Branch	WR	3	125	41.67	1	96
24	Makai Lemon	WR	1	13	13.0	0	13
	TOTALS		4	138	34.5	1	96

Punt return statistics
#	NAME	POS	RTNS	YDS	AVG	TD	LONG
1	Zachariah Branch	WR	7	158	22.57	1	75
9	Michael Jackson III	WR	2	17	8.5	0	9
	TOTALS		9	175	19.44	1	75

=== Scoring ===
==== USC vs. non-conference opponents ====
	1	2	3	4	Total
USC	31	31	35	80	177
Opponents	14	31	14	31	90

==== USC vs. Pac-12 opponents ====
	1	2	3	4	OT	Total
USC	49	41	27	29	15	161
Pac-12 opponents	17	30	29	36	13	125

==== USC vs. all opponents ====
	1	2	3	4	OT	Total
USC	80	72	62	109	15	338
Opponents	31	61	43	67	13	215
