= Duce Robinson =

American football player (born 2005)

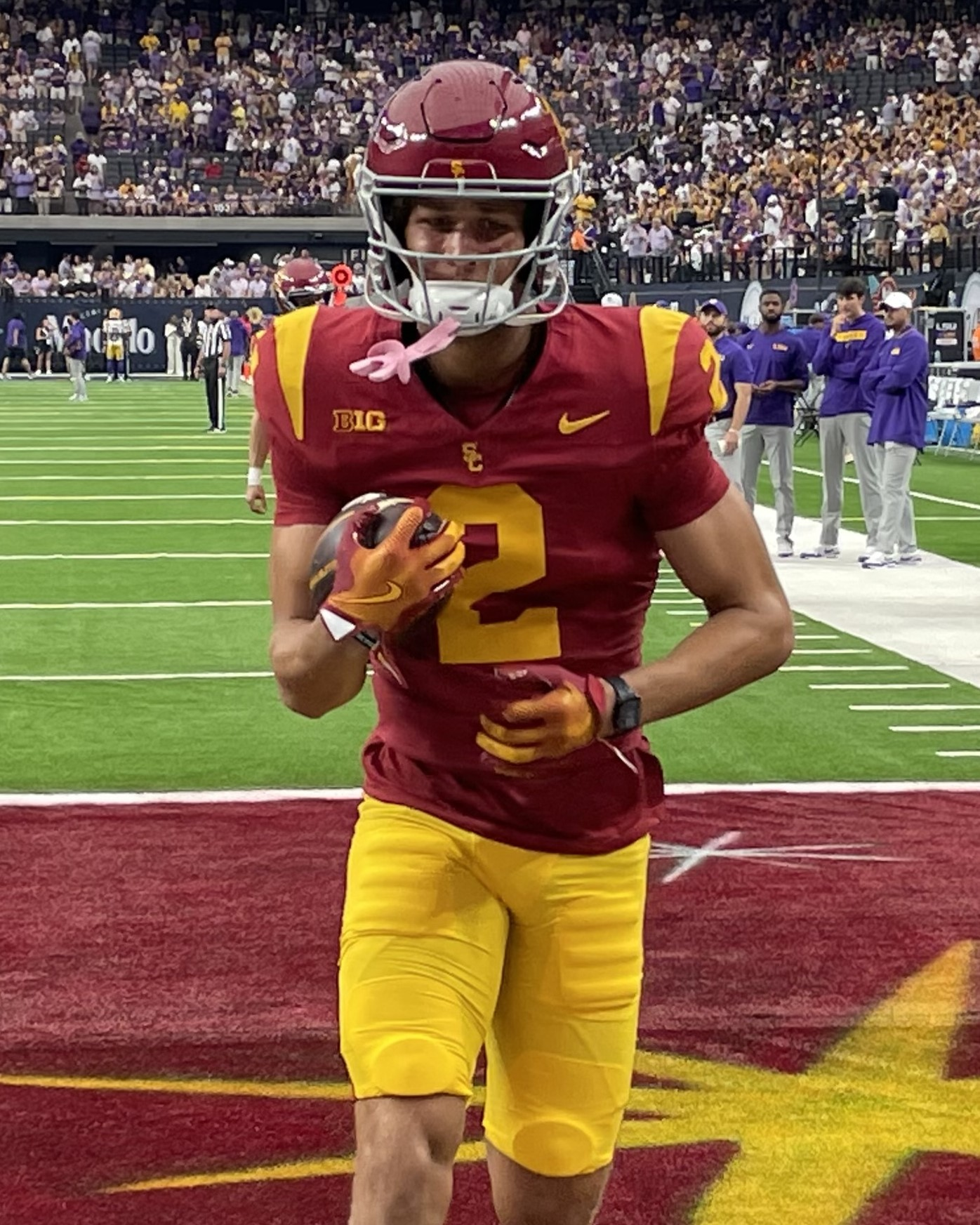
- Robinson ahead of the 2024 Vegas Kickoff Classic.

No. 0 – Florida State Seminoles
- Position: Wide receiver
- Class: Senior

Personal information
- Born: January 19, 2005 (age 21); Miami, Florida, U.S.
- Listed height: 6 ft 6 in (1.98 m)
- Listed weight: 230 lb (104 kg)

Career information
- High school: Pinnacle (Phoenix, Arizona)
- College: USC (2023–2024); Florida State (2025–present)

Awards and highlights
- First-team All-ACC (2025)
- Stats at ESPN

Duce Dade Robinson (January 19, 2005) is an American college football wide receiver and baseball outfielder who plays for the Florida State Seminoles. He previously played for the USC Trojans.

== Early life ==
Robinson initially grew up in Dallas, Texas. His family moved to Phoenix, Arizona and he enrolled at Pinnacle High School. Robinson received his first college football scholarship offer from Arizona State after taking part in a 7-on-7 tournament, despite not yet having played in a single tackle football game. He was also a starter on Pinnacle's basketball team. Robinson had 60 catches for 972 yards and eight touchdowns as a junior. Robinson caught 84 passes for 1,614 yards and 14 touchdowns as a senior and played in the Under Armour All-America Game.

Robinson was rated a five-star recruit and the best tight end prospect in the 2023 class. He was also considered a top baseball prospect for the 2023 class. Robinson committed to play both sports at USC over offers from Georgia, Alabama, Texas, and Oregon.

== College career ==
=== USC ===
Robinson was moved from tight end to wide receiver during preseason training camp prior to the start of his freshman season at USC. Robinson scored his first collegiate touchdown against Nevada on a 71-yard pass from quarterback Miller Moss. In the Holiday Bowl, Robinson had a 44-yard touchdown reception in the 42–28 victory over Louisville.

In 2024, he recorded a touchdown reception in three straight games against Michigan, Wisconsin and Minnesota. He recorded his first interception against Penn State. Robinson was a member of the Trojans baseball team. He appeared in four games and recorded one hit in six at-bats. Robinson played collegiate summer baseball for the Academy Barons of the California Collegiate League. On December 10, 2024, Robinson announced that he would enter the transfer portal.

=== Florida State ===
On December 22, 2024, it was announced that Robinson had committed to the Florida State Seminoles.

=== Statistics ===
| Season | Team | Games | | Receiving | | | | Rushing | | | |
| Season | Team | GP | GS | Rec | Yds | Avg | TD | Att | Yds | Avg | TD |
|---|---|---|---|---|---|---|---|---|---|---|---|
| 2023 | USC | 10 | 0 | 16 | 351 | 21.9 | 2 | 0 | 0 | 0.0 | 0 |
| 2024 | USC | 12 | 5 | 23 | 396 | 17.2 | 5 | 0 | 0 | 0.0 | 0 |
| 2025 | Florida State | 11 | 11 | 56 | 1,081 | 19.3 | 6 | 0 | 0 | 0.0 | 0 |
| 2026 | Florida State | 8 | 8 | 24 | 438 | 18.3 | 4 | 0 | -12 | 0.0 | 0 |
| Career | | 41 | 24 | 119 | 2,266 | 19.0 | 17 | 0 | -12 | 0.0 | 0 |

== Personal life ==
Robinson's father, Dominic Robinson, played both baseball and football at Florida State University. He has three younger siblings, two brothers and one sister. His mother was a swimmer at the University of Florida.
