= Lake McRee =

American football player (born 2002)

No. 81 – Pittsburgh Steelers
- Position: Tight end
- Roster status: Practice squad

Personal information
- Born: September 4, 2002 (age 24)
- Listed height: 6 ft 4 in (1.93 m)
- Listed weight: 243 lb (110 kg)

Career information
- High school: Lake Travis (Austin, Texas)
- College: USC (2021–2025)
- NFL draft: 2026: undrafted

Career history
- Pittsburgh Steelers (2026–present)*
- * Offseason or practice squad member only
- Stats at Pro Football Reference

Robert "Lake" McRee (born September 4, 2002) is an American professional football tight end for the Pittsburgh Steelers of the National Football League (NFL). He previously played college football for the USC Trojans. He was signed by the Steelers as an undrafted free agent in 2026.

== Early life ==
McRee attended Lake Travis High School in Austin, Texas. During his junior season, he tore his ACL. Coming out of high school, McRee was rated as a four star recruit and the 18th overall tight end in the class of 2021; he committed to play college football for the USC Trojans over offers from other schools such as Auburn, LSU, Penn State, Purdue, and Washington.

== College career ==
As a freshman in 2021, McRee tallied seven catches for 91 yards. In 2022, he totaled ten receptions for 106 yards and two touchdowns. Ahead of the 2023 Holiday Bowl, McRee tore his ACL for the second time. He finished the 2023 season with 26 receptions for 262 yards and a touchdown, before the injury. In week 1, McRee hauled in five passes for 56 yards in a victory versus LSU. In week 2, he tallied four receptions for a career-high 81 yards in a win against Utah State. He finished the 2024 season with 24 receptions for 245 yards.

=== Statistics ===
Year	Team	GP	Receiving			
Year	Team	GP	Rec	Yds	Avg	TD
2021	USC	4	7	91	13.0	0
2022	USC	13	10	106	10.6	2
2023	USC	12	26	262	10.1	1
2024	USC	10	24	245	10.2	0
2025	USC	12	30	450	15.0	4
Career		51	97	1,154	11.9	7

== Professional career ==
Pre-draft measurables
Height	Weight	Arm length	Hand span	Wingspan	40-yard dash	10-yard split	20-yard split	20-yard shuttle	Three-cone drill	Vertical jump	Broad jump	Bench press
6 ft 4 1/8 in (1.93 m)	243 lb (110 kg)	31 1/2 in (0.80 m)	9 1/4 in (0.23 m)	6 ft 6 1/2 in (1.99 m)	4.82 s	1.70 s	2.79 s	4.68 s	7.25 s	31.5 in (0.80 m)	9 ft 3 in (2.82 m)	22 reps
All values from NFL Combine/Pro Day

After not being selected in the 2026 NFL draft, McRee was signed by the Pittsburgh Steelers as an undrafted free agent on April 25, 2026. He was waived by Pittsburgh on August 30 and re-signed to the practice squad.
