= MarShawn Lloyd =

American football player (born 2001)

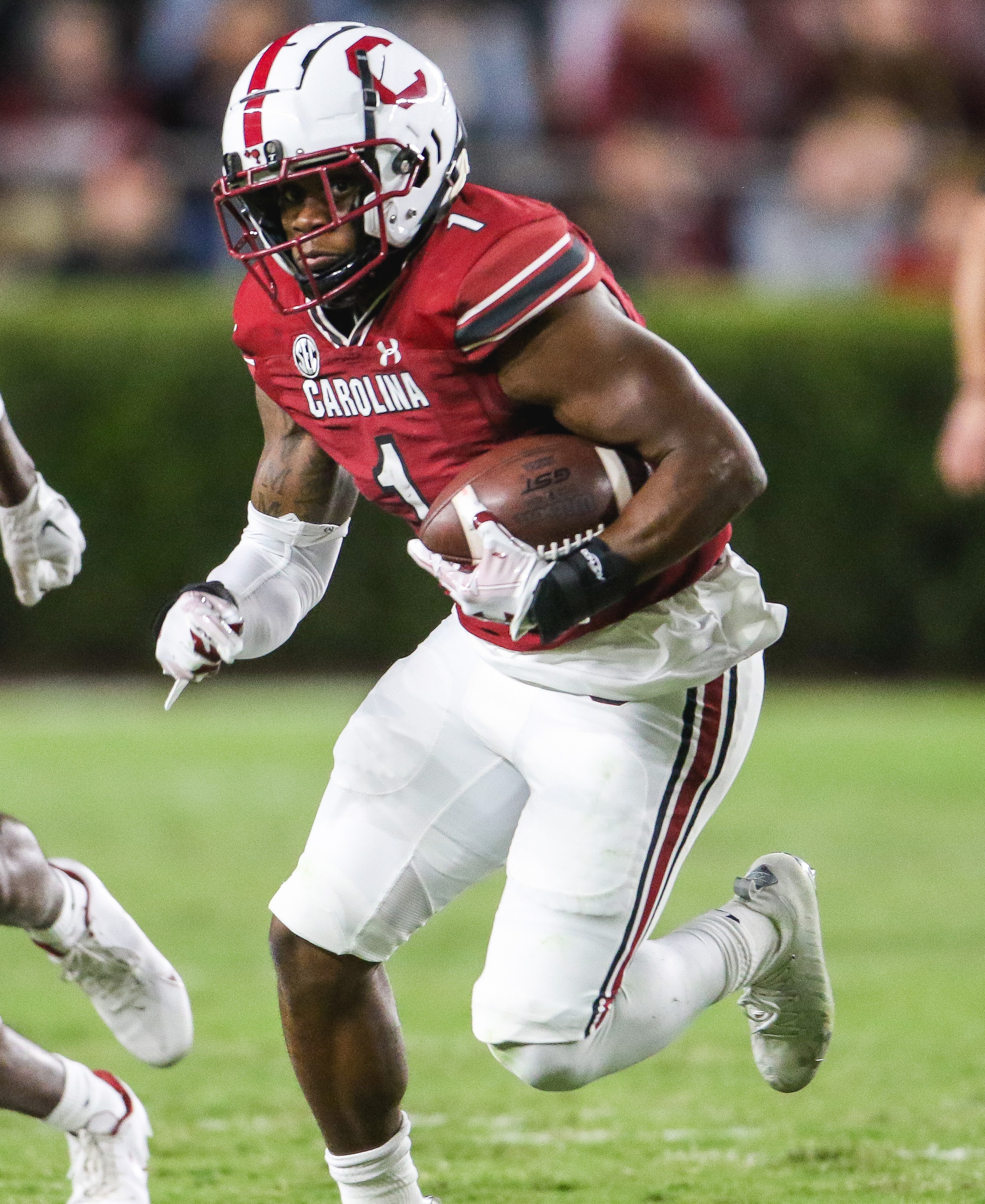
- Lloyd with the South Carolina Gamecocks in 2022

No. 32 – Green Bay Packers
- Position: Running back
- Roster status: Active

Personal information
- Born: January 5, 2001 (age 25); Wilmington, Delaware, U.S.
- Listed height: 5 ft 9 in (1.75 m)
- Listed weight: 220 lb (100 kg)

Career information
- High school: DeMatha Catholic (Hyattsville, Maryland)
- College: South Carolina (2020–2022); USC (2023)
- NFL draft: 2024: 3rd round, 88th overall pick

Career history
- Green Bay Packers (2024–present)

Career NFL statistics as of Week 10, 2026
- Rushing yards: 177
- Rushing average: 2.6
- Rushing touchdowns: 2
- Receptions: 17
- Receiving yards: 108
- Receiving touchdowns: 1
- Stats at Pro Football Reference

MarShawn Davon Thamir Lloyd (born January 5, 2001) is an American professional football running back for the Green Bay Packers of the National Football League (NFL). He played college football for the South Carolina Gamecocks and the USC Trojans and was selected by the Packers in the third round of the 2024 NFL draft.

== Early life ==
Lloyd lived in Delaware, but traveled every day to attend DeMatha Catholic High School in Hyattsville, Maryland. He was selected to play in the 2020 Under Armour All-America Game. A five-star recruit, Lloyd committed to the University of South Carolina to play college football.

== College career ==
Lloyd missed his first year at South Carolina in 2020 due to a torn ACL. He returned from the injury to play in 12 games as a backup in 2021 and rushed 64 times for 228 yards and one touchdown. Lloyd took over as the starter his redshirt sophomore year in 2022.

On January 6, 2023, Lloyd announced that he was transferring to the University of Southern California.

== Professional career ==
Pre-draft measurables
Height	Weight	Arm length	Hand span	Wingspan	40-yard dash	10-yard split	20-yard split	Vertical jump	Broad jump	Bench press
5 ft 8 3/4 in (1.75 m)	220 lb (100 kg)	30 3/8 in (0.77 m)	8 3/4 in (0.22 m)	6 ft 1 5/8 in (1.87 m)	4.46 s	1.56 s	2.63 s	36.0 in (0.91 m)	9 ft 10 in (3.00 m)	25 reps
All values from NFL Combine

Lloyd was selected in the third round with the 88th overall pick of the 2024 NFL draft by the Green Bay Packers. On May 14, he signed his contract with the Packers. On September 17, 2024, Lloyd was placed on injured reserve. He was activated on November 18, but placed on the non-football illness list with appendicitis.

On August 26, 2025, Lloyd was placed on injured reserve/designated for return. He was activated on December 17, as a procedural move. Lloyd was placed back on injured reserve two days later, allowing him to remain eligible for a possible return during the playoffs.

== Career statistics ==
=== NFL ===
Legend
	Led the league
**Bold**	Career high

NFL regular season statistics
Year	Team	Games		Rushing					Receiving					Fumbles	
Year	Team	GP	GS	Att	Yds	Avg	Lng	TD	Rec	Yds	Avg	Lng	TD	Fum	Lost
2024	GB	1	0	6	15	2.5	5	0	1	3	3.0	3	0	0	0
2025	GB	0	0	Did not play due to injury											
Career		1	0	6	15	2.5	5	0	1	3	3.0	3	0	0	0
Source: pro-football-reference.com

=== College ===
College statistics
Season	Team	Games		Rushing				Receiving			
Season	Team	GP	GS	Att	Yards	Avg	TD	Rec	Yards	Avg	TD
2020	South Carolina	Redshirt (redshirt)									
2021	South Carolina	**12**	0	64	228	3.6	1	3	44	14.7	0
2022	South Carolina	9	**8**	111	573	5.2	**9**	**18**	176	9.8	**2**
2023	USC	11	2	**116**	**820**	**7.1**	**9**	13	**232**	**17.8**	0
Career		26	10	227	1,234	5.4	13	26	299	11.5	2
