= Eric Gentry =

American football player (born 2003)

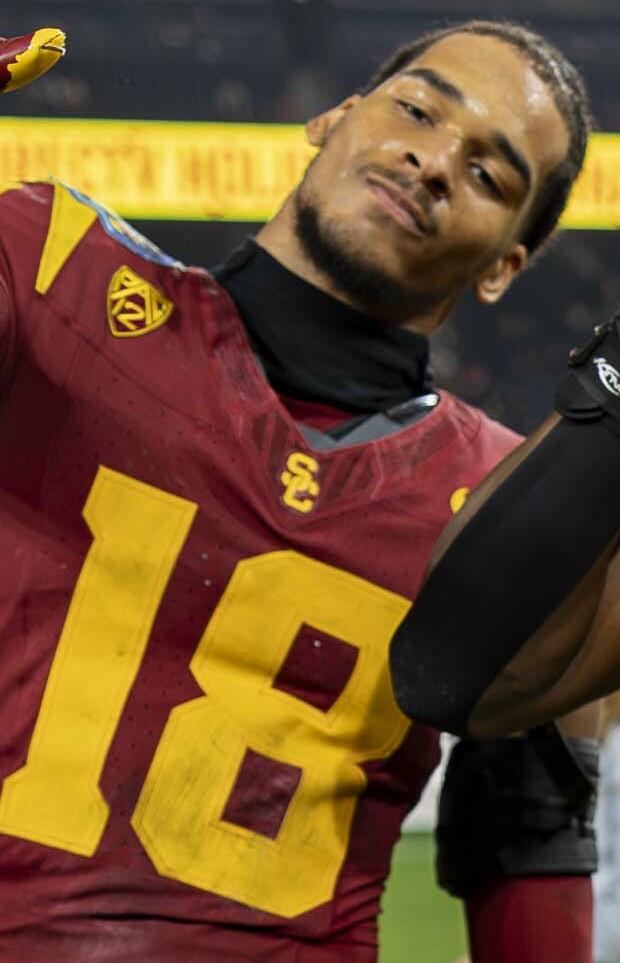
- Gentry at the 2023 Holiday Bowl

Columbus Aviators
- Position: Linebacker
- Roster status: Unsigned draft pick

Personal information
- Born: May 20, 2003 (age 23); Philadelphia, Pennsylvania, U.S.
- Listed height: 6 ft 7 in (2.01 m)
- Listed weight: 221 lb (100 kg)

Career information
- High school: Neumann-Goretti Catholic (Philadelphia)
- College: Arizona State (2021); USC (2022–2025)
- NFL draft: 2026: undrafted

Career history
- Cincinnati Bengals (2026)*; Columbus Aviators (2027-present)
- * Offseason or practice squad member only
- Stats at Pro Football Reference

Eric Gentry (born May 20, 2003) is an American professional football linebacker. He played college football for the USC Trojans and the Arizona State Sun Devils before being signed as an undrafted free agent to the Bengals.

== Early life ==
Gentry was born on May 20, 2003 in Philadelphia, Pennsylvania. The middle child of 10 children, Eric and his siblings were guided by their parents from a young age. Gentry’s father, Eric Sr., was a top-level mechanic who would often take his son to work with him to teach him dedication and work ethic. His mother, Quon, is a registered nurse and former athlete at Rutgers University.

Gentry attended Saints John Neumann and Maria Goretti Catholic High School in Philadelphia, Pennsylvania. He played both linebacker and defensive end in high school. He did not play football his senior year in high school in 2020 due to the COVID-19 pandemic. He committed to Arizona State University to play college football.

== College career ==
As a true freshman at Arizona State in 2021, Gentry played in 12 games and started the final three games. He finished the year with 45 tackles and one sack. After the season, he transferred to the University of Southern California (USC). He was a starter at inside linebacker his first year at USC in 2022.

== Professional career ==
Pre-draft measurables
Height	Weight	Arm length	Hand span	Wingspan	40-yard dash	10-yard split	20-yard split	20-yard shuttle	Three-cone drill	Vertical jump	Broad jump	Bench press
6 ft 6 5/8 in (2.00 m)	221 lb (100 kg)	35 in (0.89 m)	10 1/2 in (0.27 m)	7 ft 2 1/4 in (2.19 m)	4.60 s	1.63 s	2.74 s	4.41 s	6.76 s	35.5 in (0.90 m)	10 ft 4 in (3.15 m)	13 reps
All values from NFL Combine/Pro Day

On May 8, 2026, Gentry signed with the Cincinnati Bengals as an undrafted free agent. On August 30, Gentry was waived by Cincinnati as a part of final roster cuts.
