= Dorian Singer =

American gridiron football player (born 2002)

- Singer with the Winnipeg Blue Bombers in 2026

No. 17 – Winnipeg Blue Bombers
- Position: Wide receiver
- Roster status: Active
- CFL status: American

Personal information
- Born: October 16, 2002 (age 24); Saint Paul, Minnesota, U.S.
- Listed height: 6 ft 0 in (1.83 m)
- Listed weight: 191 lb (87 kg)

Career information
- High school: Pinnacle (Phoenix, Arizona)
- College: Arizona (2021–2022); USC (2023); Utah (2024)
- NFL draft: 2025: undrafted

Career history
- Jacksonville Jaguars (2025)*; Winnipeg Blue Bombers (2026–present)
- * Offseason or practice squad member only

Career CFL statistics as of 2026
- Receptions: 29
- Receiving yards: 584
- Receiving touchdowns: 3
- Stats at Pro Football Reference

Dorian Singer (born October 16, 2002) is an American professional football wide receiver for the Winnipeg Blue Bombers of the Canadian Football League (CFL). He played college football for the Arizona Wildcats, USC Trojans and Utah Utes.

== Early life ==
Singer attended Tartan Senior High School in Oakdale, Minnesota, before transferring to Pinnacle High School in Phoenix, Arizona, for his senior year. As a senior, he had 37 receptions for 889 yards and 14 touchdowns. He committed to the University of Arizona to play college football.

== College career ==
As a true freshman at Arizona in 2021, Singer played in five games and had 18 receptions for 301 yards. As a sophomore in 2022, he started 11 of 12 games and had 66 receptions for a Pac-12 leading 1,105 yards and six touchdowns. After the season, he entered the transfer portal and later announced he was transferring to the University of Southern California (USC).

On January 3, 2024, Singer announced that he would be entering the transfer portal for the second time. On January 15, he announced that he would transfer to University of Utah.

=== Statistics ===
College statistics
Year	Team	Games		Receiving			
Year	Team	GP	GS	Rec	Yards	Avg	TD
2021	Arizona	5	1	18	301	16.7	0
2022	Arizona	12	11	66	1,105	16.7	6
2023	USC	12	10	24	289	12.0	3
2024	Utah	12	12	53	702	13.2	1
Career		29	22	108	1,695	15.7	9

== Professional career ==
Pre-draft measurables
Height	Weight	20-yard shuttle	Three-cone drill	Vertical jump	Broad jump	Bench press
5 ft 11 3/4 in (1.82 m)	191 lb (87 kg)	4.46 s	7.19 s	30.5 in (0.77 m)	9 ft 2 in (2.79 m)	11 reps
All values from Pro Day

=== Jacksonville Jaguars ===
On April 30, 2025, Singer signed as an undrafted free agent with the Jacksonville Jaguars. He was waived on August 26 as part of final roster cuts. Singer was re-signed to the practice squad on August 27. He was released from the practice squad on August 29.

=== Winnipeg Blue Bombers ===
On February 3, 2026, Singer signed with the Winnipeg Blue Bombers of the Canadian Football League (CFL). On May 31, 2026, he was released as part of final roster cuts but immediately signed to the team's practice roster.
