= Pinnacle High School =

Public school in Phoenix, Arizona

Location
- 3535 East Mayo Boulevard; Phoenix, Arizona 85050; United States; 33°40′51″N 112°00′29″W

Information
- Type: Public high school
- Established: 2000
- School district: Paradise Valley Unified School District
- Principal: Jeremy Richards
- Teaching staff: 104.54 (on an FTE basis)
- Grades: 9–12
- Enrollment: 2,501 (2023–2024)
- Student to teacher ratio: 23.92
- Colors: Blue & white
- Nickname: Pioneers
- Website: Official website

Pinnacle High School (PHS) is a public high school located in the north valley of Phoenix, Maricopa County, Arizona. PHS opened in 2000, and is a part of the Paradise Valley Unified School District (PVUSD). The students are called Pinnacle Pioneers and the school's mascot is Pioneer Pete. The school's main colors are blue and white, however in recent years, red has been added as a school color.

== Campus ==
Pinnacle High School's campus includes eight buildings, two baseball fields, two softball fields, one football field, two practice football fields, two lacrosse fields, a track, eight tennis courts, ten batting/racquetball cages, a student parking lot, and a staff parking lot. Notable buildings include two two-story classroom structures, a library, an administrative building, a gymnasium, and an auditorium with connected classrooms dedicated to the performing arts.

== Demographics ==
The demographic breakdown of the 2,463 students enrolled in the 2015–2016 school year was:

- Male - 52.3%
- Female - 47.7%
- Native American/Alaskan - 0.4%
- Asian/Pacific islanders - 3.7%
- Black - 1.8%
- Hispanic - 11.5%
- White - 78.6%
- Multiracial - 4.0%

7.1% of the students were eligible for free or reduced-cost lunch. For 2015–2016, Pinnacle was a Title I school.

== Notable alumni ==
- Brett Nicholas (2007) – former MLB player
- George Malki (2009) - former MLS player
- Mason Robertson (2013) – professional soccer player who played in Scotland and India
- Sydney Wiese (2013) – former WNBA player
- Brian Lewerke (2015) – former NFL quarterback
- Kelsey Turnbow (2017) - professional soccer player
- Hogan Hatten (2019 – transferred) - NFL football player for the Detroit Lions
- Nico Mannion (2019) – basketball player who played for the Golden State Warriors, represented Italy in the Olympics
- Spencer Rattler (2019) – NFL football player for the New Orleans Saints
- Dorian Singer (2021) – football player for the Utah Utes
- Kate Faasse (2022) - professional soccer player Houston Dash
- Elijah Paige (2023) – football player for the USC Trojans
- Duce Robinson (2023) – football player for the Florida State Seminoles
