= Anthony Lucas (defensive end) =

American football player (born 2004)

No. 61 – Detroit Lions
- Position: Defensive end
- Roster status: Practice squad

Personal information
- Born: October 8, 2004 (age 22); Haiti
- Listed height: 6 ft 5 in (1.96 m)
- Listed weight: 256 lb (116 kg)

Career information
- High school: Chaparral (Scottsdale, Arizona)
- College: Texas A&M (2022); USC (2023–2025)
- NFL draft: 2026: undrafted

Career history
- Detroit Lions (2026–present)

Career NFL statistics
- Games played: 1
- Stats at Pro Football Reference
- Stats at Pro Football Reference

Anthony Lucas (born October 8, 2004) is an American professional football defensive end for the Detroit Lions of the National Football League (NFL). He played college football for the Texas A&M Aggies and USC Trojans. Lucas was signed by the Lions as an undrafted free agent following the 2026 NFL draft.

== Early life ==
Lucas attended Chaparral High School in Scottsdale, Arizona. He had 29 tackles with six sacks his junior year and 64 tackles with 9.5 sacks his senior year. Lucas was selected to play in the 2022 Under Armour All-American Game. A five-star recruit, he committed to Texas A&M University to play college football.

== College career ==
In his lone season at Texas A&M his true freshman year in 2022, Lucas played in seven games and had 10 tackles. After the season, he transferred to the University of Southern California (USC). In his first year at USC in 2023, he played in all 13 games with one start and had 10 tackles. Lucas started the first six games of his junior year in 2024, before suffering a season-ending injury. For the season he had 16 tackles. Lucas returned to USC for his senior year in 2025.

== Professional career ==
Pre-draft measurables
Height	Weight	Arm length	Hand span	Wingspan
6 ft 5 1/2 in (1.97 m)	256 lb (116 kg)	33 1/2 in (0.85 m)	10 1/4 in (0.26 m)	7 ft 1 1/8 in (2.16 m)
All values from NFL Combine

Lucas was signed as an undrafted free agent by the Detroit Lions after the conclusion of the 2026 NFL draft. On August 30, 2026, Lucas was waived by Detroit as a part of final roster cuts; he was re-signed to the team's practice squad the following day.
