= Mason Cobb =

American football player (born 2001)

No. 13
- Position: Linebacker
- Class: Redshirt Senior

Personal information
- Born: October 29, 2001 (age 25)
- Listed height: 6 ft 0 in (1.83 m)
- Listed weight: 232 lb (105 kg)

Career information
- High school: Provo (Provo, Utah)
- College: Oklahoma State (2020–2022); USC (2023–2024)

Awards and highlights
- Second-team All-Big 12 (2022)
- Stats at ESPN

Mason Cobb (born October 29, 2001) is an American former college football linebacker for the USC Trojans. He previously played for the Oklahoma State Cowboys.

== Early life ==
Cobb attended Provo High School in Provo, Utah. He was rated as a three-star recruit and committed to play college football for the Oklahoma State Cowboys.

== College career ==
=== Oklahoma State ===
In his first two collegiate seasons in 2020 and 2021, Cobb played in 19 games where he totaled 13 tackles with three being for a loss, and a sack. He had a breakout 2022 season with the Cowboys where he started in all 13 games, notching 96 tackles with 13 being for a loss, two sacks, an interception, and a forced fumble, earning second-team all-Big 12 Conference honors. After the 2022 season, Cobb entered his name into the NCAA transfer portal.

=== USC ===
Cobb transferred to play for the USC Trojans. In week 7 of the 2023 season, he recorded five tackles in a loss to Notre Dame. Cobb finished his first season with the Trojans with 85 tackles with seven being for a loss, two pass deflections, and a fumble recovery.

== Professional career ==
Pre-draft measurables
Height	Weight	Arm length	Hand span	Bench press
5 ft 11 3/4 in (1.82 m)	232 lb (105 kg)	30 1/4 in (0.77 m)	9 in (0.23 m)	20 reps
All values from Pro Day
