= Emmanuel Pregnon =

American football player (born 2001)

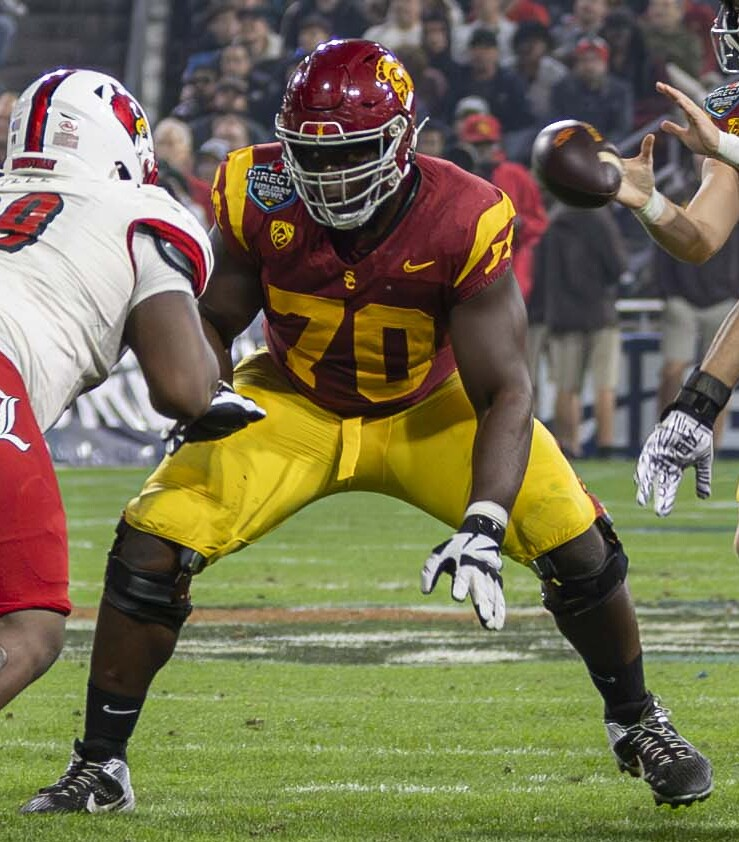
- Pregnon with the USC Trojans in 2023

No. 75 – Jacksonville Jaguars
- Position: Guard
- Roster status: Active

Personal information
- Born: October 4, 2001 (age 25); Denver, Colorado, U.S.
- Listed height: 6 ft 4 in (1.93 m)
- Listed weight: 318 lb (144 kg)

Career information
- High school: Thomas Jefferson (Denver, Colorado)
- College: Wyoming (2020–2022); USC (2023–2024); Oregon (2025)
- NFL draft: 2026: 3rd round, 88th overall pick

Career history
- Jacksonville Jaguars (2026–present)

Awards and highlights
- First-team All-American (2025); First-team All-Big Ten (2025); Second-team All-Big Ten (2024); Freshman All-American (2022)

Career NFL statistics as of Week 7, 2026
- Games played: 6
- Games started: 6
- Stats at Pro Football Reference

Emmanuel Pregnon (born October 4, 2001) is an American professional football guard for the Jacksonville Jaguars of the National Football League (NFL). He played college football for the Wyoming Cowboys, USC Trojans and Oregon Ducks. Pregnon was selected by the Jaguars in the third round of the 2026 NFL draft.

== Early life ==
Pregnon attended Thomas Jefferson High School in Denver, Colorado. He was an unranked recruit and committed to play college football for the Wyoming Cowboys. Pregnon is of Ivorian descent.

== College career ==
=== Wyoming ===
Pregnon opted out of his freshman season in 2020 due to the COVID-19 pandemic before taking a redshirt in 2021. Heading into the 2022 season, he earned a starting spot on the Cowboys offensive line. Pregnon served as the team's starting guard throughout the year and earned multiple freshman all-American honors. After the 2022 season, he entered his name into the NCAA transfer portal.

=== USC ===
Pregnon transferred to play for the USC Trojans. In his first two seasons with the Trojans he served as the team's primary starting left guard. For his performance during the 2024 season, Pregnon was named second-team all-Big Ten Conference. After accepting an invite to play in the 2025 East-West Shrine Bowl, Pregnon was expected to declare for the 2025 NFL draft, however he decided to return to play college football in 2025.

=== Oregon ===
On January 3, 2025, Pregnon announced his intention to enter his name into the college football transfer portal. On January 14, 2025, Pregnon announced his commitment to transfer to play for the Oregon Ducks for the 2025 college football season.

== Professional career ==
Pre-draft measurables
Height	Weight	Arm length	Hand span	Wingspan	40-yard dash	10-yard split	20-yard split	20-yard shuttle	Three-cone drill	Vertical jump	Broad jump	Bench press
6 ft 4 1/4 in (1.94 m)	314 lb (142 kg)	33 5/8 in (0.85 m)	11 in (0.28 m)	6 ft 10 7/8 in (2.11 m)	5.21 s	1.82 s	3.02 s	4.81 s	7.72 s	35.0 in (0.89 m)	9 ft 3 in (2.82 m)	30 reps
All values from NFL Combine/Pro Day

Pregnon was selected by the Jacksonville Jaguars in the third round with the 88th overall pick in the 2026 NFL draft.
