= Tahj Washington =

American football player (born 2001)

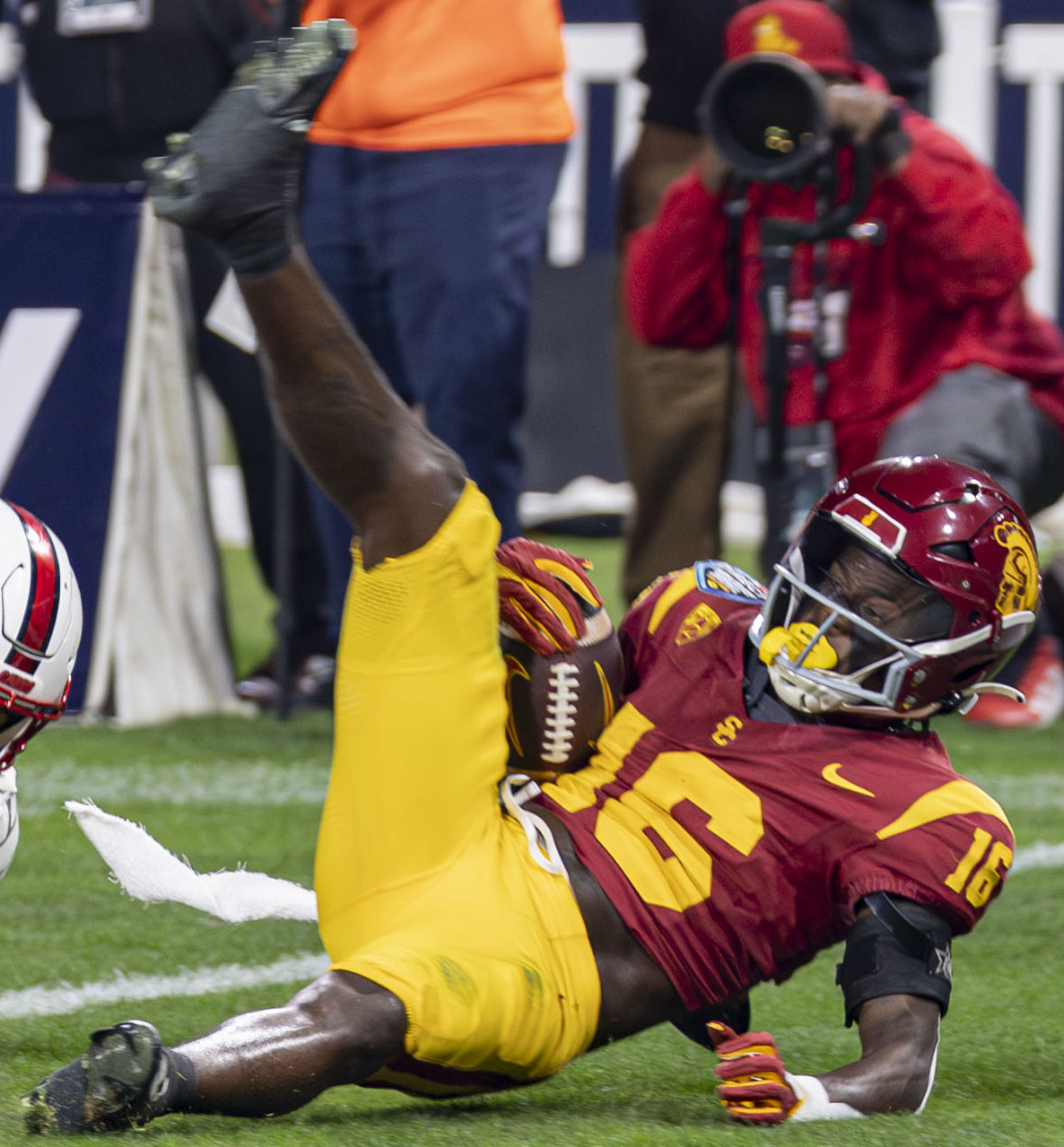
- Washington scoring a touchdown in the 2023 Holiday Bowl

Profile
- Position: Wide receiver

Personal information
- Born: May 16, 2001 (age 25); Marshall, Texas, U.S.
- Listed height: 5 ft 10 in (1.78 m)
- Listed weight: 174 lb (79 kg)

Career information
- High school: Marshall
- College: Memphis (2019–2020); USC (2021–2023)
- NFL draft: 2024: 7th round, 241st overall pick

Career history
- Miami Dolphins (2024–2025); Philadelphia Eagles (2026)*
- * Offseason or practice squad member only

Career NFL statistics as of 2025
- Receptions: 3
- Receiving yards: 37
- Stats at Pro Football Reference

Tahj Washington (born May 16, 2001) is an American football wide receiver. He played college football for the Memphis Tigers and USC Trojans.

== Early life ==
Washington grew up in Marshall, Texas as the son of Christoper and Shannon Washington. He attended Marshall High School where he lettered in football and track & field. He was rated a three-star recruit and committed to play college football at Memphis over offers from Air Force, Arkansas-Pine Bluff, Bowling Green, Houston Christian, Kansas, Louisiana, McNeese State, Sam Houston State, Southern Miss, Stephen F. Austin, Texas Tech, Texas State, Tulane and Tulsa.

== College career ==
=== Memphis ===
During Washington's true freshman season in 2019, he played four games and caught three passes for 32 yards. During the 2020 season, he played in 11 games and finished the season with 43 catches for 743 yards with six touchdowns, ran four times for 11 yards with a touchdown, returned 12 kickoffs for 242 yards and made four tackles. For his performance on the season, Washington was named a Freshman All-American.

On March 24, 2021, Washington announced that he would be entering the transfer portal. Six days later, he announced that he would be transferring to USC.

=== USC ===
During the 2021 season, Washington played in 12 games and recorded 54 receptions for 602 yards with a touchdown and seven kickoff returns for 121 yards and a tackle. In week nine of the 2022 season, Washington had a career performance hauling in seven receptions for 118 yards and two touchdowns, in 45–37 over Arizona. During the 2022 season, he played in 14 games and started 11 of them. He finished the season with 50 receptions for 785 yards with six touchdowns and three kickoff returns for 75 yards.

During the 2023 season, Washington returned as a starter as a redshirt senior. On August 3, 2023, he was selected to the Paul Hornung Award Watch List.

== Professional career ==
Pre-draft measurables
Height	Weight	Arm length	Hand span	Wingspan	40-yard dash	10-yard split	20-yard split	20-yard shuttle	Three-cone drill	Vertical jump	Broad jump
5 ft 9 3/4 in (1.77 m)	174 lb (79 kg)	29 1/8 in (0.74 m)	8 3/8 in (0.21 m)	5 ft 10 in (1.78 m)	4.52 s	1.63 s	2.64 s	4.22 s	6.81 s	35.0 in (0.89 m)	10 ft 3 in (3.12 m)
All values from NFL Combine/Pro Day

=== Miami Dolphins ===
Washington was selected by the Miami Dolphins in the seventh round, 241st overall, of the 2024 NFL draft. He was placed on injured reserve on July 23, 2024, ending his season.

On August 25, 2026, Washington was waived by the Dolphins.

=== Philadelphia Eagles ===
On August 27, 2026, Washington signed with the Philadelphia Eagles. He was waived by the Eagles as a part of final roster cuts on August 30.
