= Bear Alexander =

American football player (born 2003)

No. 1 – Oregon Ducks
- Position: Defensive lineman
- Class: Redshirt Senior

Personal information
- Born: October 7, 2003 (age 23); Terrell, Texas, U.S.
- Listed height: 6 ft 3 in (1.91 m)
- Listed weight: 302 lb (137 kg)

Career information
- High school: IMG Academy (Bradenton, Florida)
- College: Georgia (2022); USC (2023–2024); Oregon (2025–present)

Awards and highlights
- CFP National Champion (2022); Second-team All-Big Ten (2025)
- Stats at ESPN

Keithian Deshun "Bear" Alexander (born October 7, 2003) is an American college football defensive lineman for the Oregon Ducks. He previously played for the Georgia Bulldogs and the USC Trojans.

== Early life ==
Alexander attended IMG Academy in Bradenton, Florida. A four-star recruit, Alexander committed to play college football at the University of Georgia, over offers from Alabama, Florida, and Texas A&M.

== College career ==
=== Georgia ===
During his freshman season, Alexander played in 12 games, recording nine tackles, three tackles-for-loss, and two sacks. He would tally a sack in the 2023 College Football Playoff National Championship Game, in a 65–7 victory over TCU.

On April 15, 2023, Alexander announced that he would enter the transfer portal.

=== USC ===
On April 23, 2023, Alexander announced that he would transfer to the University of Southern California to play for the USC Trojans, under head coach Lincoln Riley. In his first season at USC, he totaled 48 tackles, 6.5 tackles-for-loss, and 1.5 sacks.

On September 25, 2024, Alexander's family announced that he would quit the active roster to redshirt and miss the Trojans' remaining games in the 2024 season. On December 9, 2024, Alexander announced that he would enter the transfer portal for the second time.

=== Oregon ===
On December 20, 2024, Alexander announced his decision to transfer to the University of Oregon to play for the Oregon Ducks. In his 2025 campaign he earned Second-Team All Big Ten.
