= Elijah Paige =

American football player (born 2005)

- Paige in 2023

No. 72 – USC Trojans
- Position: Offensive tackle
- Class: Redshirt Junior

Personal information
- Born: February 19, 2005 (age 21)
- Listed height: 6 ft 7 in (2.01 m)
- Listed weight: 315 lb (143 kg)

Career information
- High school: Pinnacle (Phoenix, Arizona)
- College: USC (2023–present)
- Stats at ESPN

Elijah Paige (born February 19, 2005) is an American college football offensive tackle for the USC Trojans.

== Early life ==
Paige attended Pinnacle High School in Phoenix, Arizona. He originally committed to play college football at the University of Notre Dame before flipping his commitment to the University of Southern California (USC) to play college football.

== College career ==
Paige played in five games and made one start his first year at USC in 2023. He took over as the starting left tackle in 2024 and started all 13 games. Paige started all seven games he appeared in 2026, missing six games due to injury. He returned to USC as the starting left tackle in 2026.
