= Austin Jones (running back) =

American football player (born 2001)

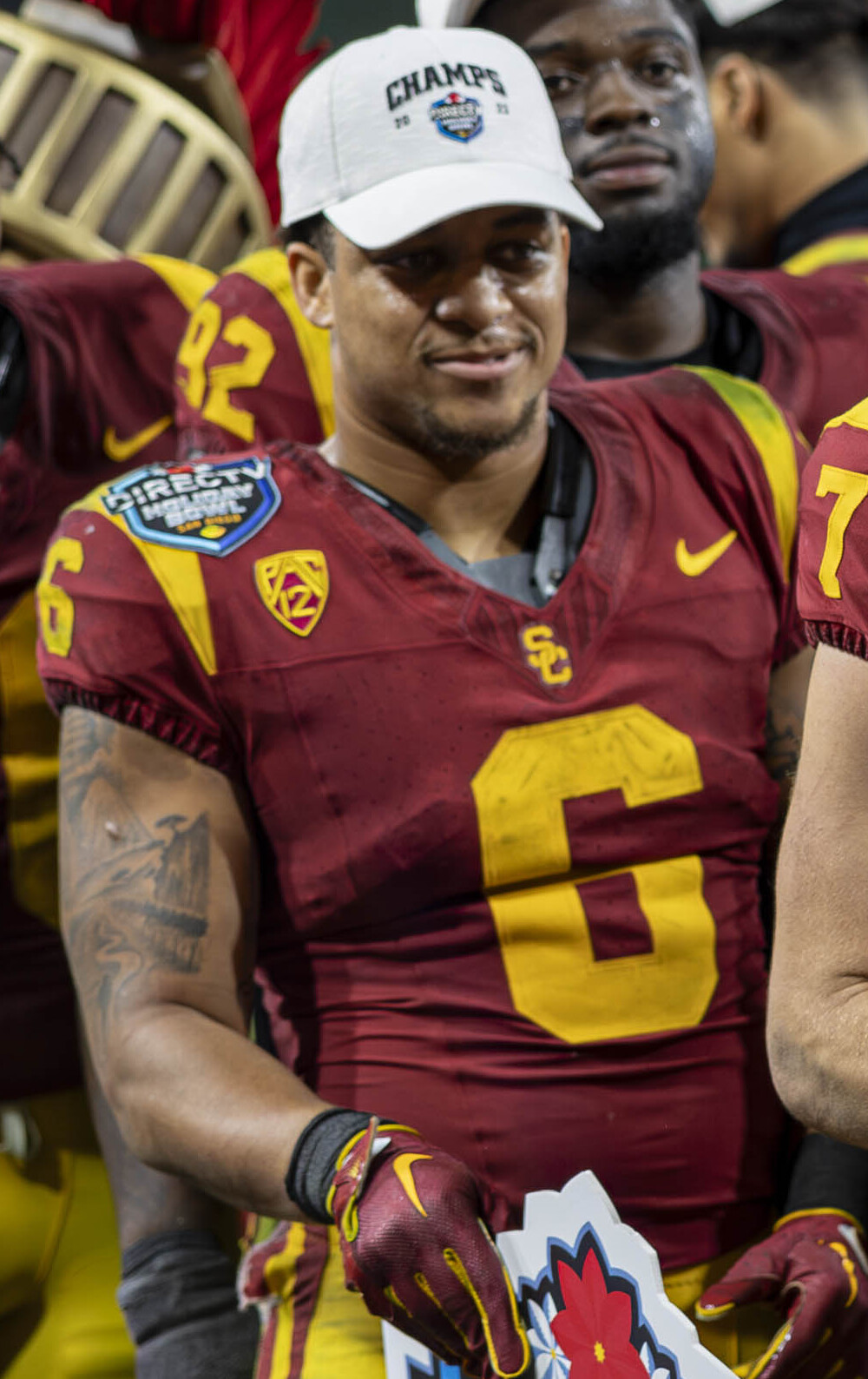
- Jones in 2023

Profile
- Position: Running back

Personal information
- Born: February 7, 2001 (age 25); Antioch, California, U.S.
- Listed height: 5 ft 10 in (1.78 m)
- Listed weight: 200 lb (91 kg)

Career information
- High school: Bishop O'Dowd (Oakland, California)
- College: Stanford (2019–2021); USC (2022–2023)
- NFL draft: 2024: undrafted

Career history

Playing
- Washington Commanders (2024)*
- * Offseason or practice squad member only

Coaching
- Lakeside High School (2025–present) Head coach

Austin Jones (born February 7, 2001) is an American professional football running back. He played college football for the Stanford Cardinal and USC Trojans and signed with the Washington Commanders as an undrafted free agent in 2024.

== Early life ==
Jones was born on February 7, 2001, in Antioch, California. He attended Bishop O'Dowd High School, where he rushed for 1,560 yards and 23 touchdowns as a junior Coming out of high school, Jones was rated as a four-star recruit; he committed to play college football for the Stanford Cardinal.

== College career ==
=== Stanford ===
As a freshman in 2019, Jones rushed 45 times for 227 yards and a touchdown. In 2020, he tallied 126 carries for 550 yards and nine touchdowns as he started all six games for Stanford. In 2021, Jones carried the ball 107 times for 378 yards and two touchdowns. After the season, he entered his name into the NCAA transfer portal.

During his time at Stanford, Jones recorded 278 carries for 1,155 yards and 12 touchdowns and hauled in 67 passes for 531 yards and a touchdown.

=== USC ===
Jones transferred to play for the USC Trojans. In his USC debut in the 2022 season opener, he rushed four times for 48 yards and two touchdowns and made one catch for 21 yards. In week 11 of the 2022 season, Jones rushed 11 times for 74 yards and hauled in four receptions and a touchdown. In week 12, Jones rushed for 120 yards and two touchdowns, while also hauling in four receptions for 57 yards. In the 2022 regular season finale, Jones rushed 25 times for 154 yards in a win over Notre Dame. During the 2022 season, Jones rushed 135 times for 705 yards and five touchdowns, while also totaling 25 receptions for 267 yards and a touchdown. In the 2023 season, Jones rushed 85 times for 477 yards and seven touchdowns. After the 2023 season, Jones declared for the 2024 NFL draft.

== Professional career ==
Pre-draft measurables
Height	Weight	Arm length	Hand span	40-yard dash	10-yard split	20-yard split	20-yard shuttle	Three-cone drill	Vertical jump	Broad jump
5 ft 9 5/8 in (1.77 m)	200 lb (91 kg)	29 1/4 in (0.74 m)	8 1/4 in (0.21 m)	4.58 s	1.64 s	2.66 s	4.39 s	7.00 s	36.5 in (0.93 m)	10 ft 0 in (3.05 m)
All values from Pro Day

Jones signed with the Washington Commanders as an undrafted free agent on April 29, 2024, and was released on August 27.

== Coaching career ==
In 2025, Austin Jones was hired by Lakeside High School (Lake Elsinore, CA) to coach their football team.
