= 2023 Holiday Bowl =

Postseason college football bowl game

2023 DirecTV Holiday Bowl
- 44th Holiday Bowl
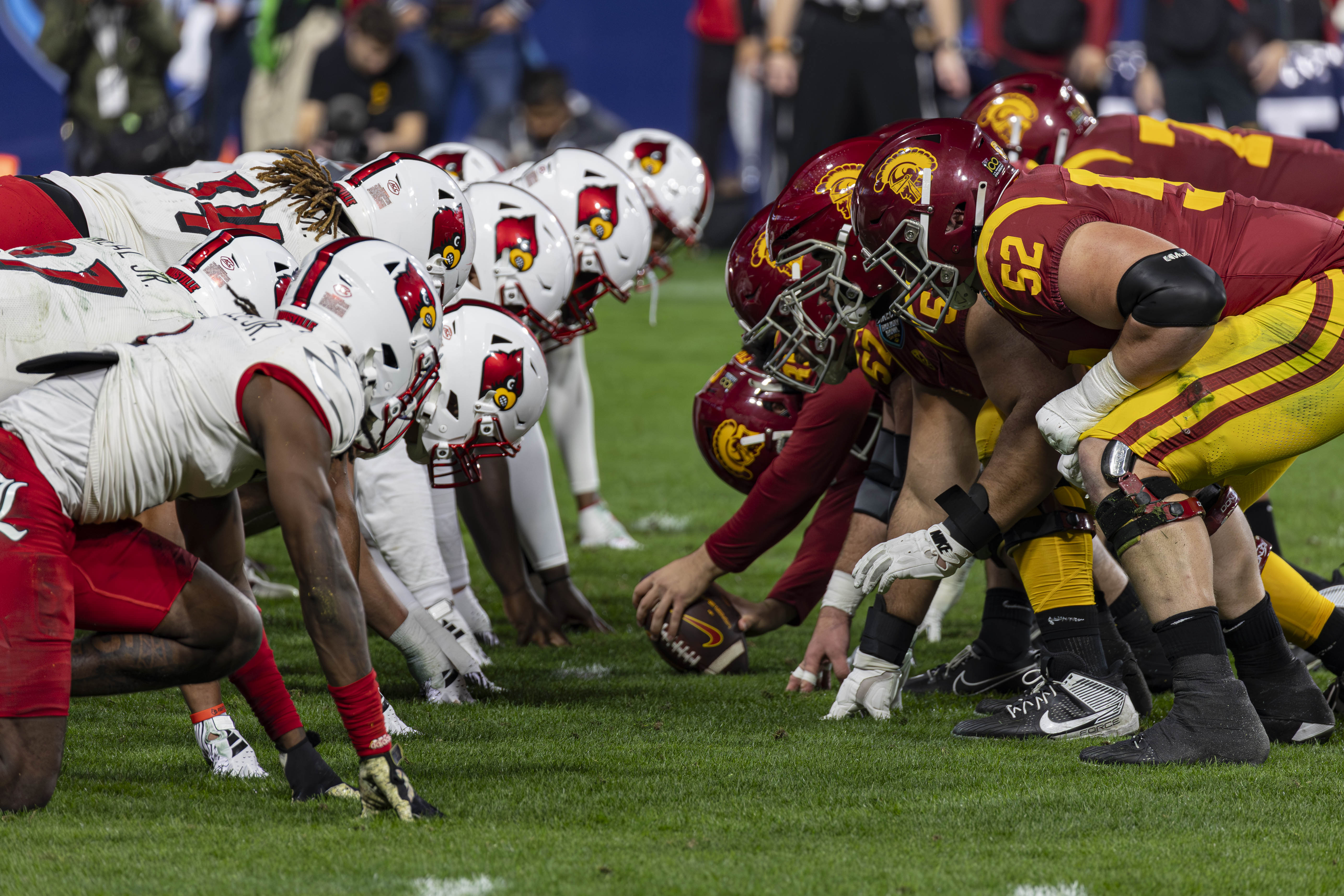
Louisville Cardinals	USC Trojans
(10–3)	(7–5)
ACC	Pac-12
28	42
Head coach: Jeff Brohm	Head coach: Lincoln Riley
AP / Coaches / CFP; 16 / 15 / 15
	1	2	3	4	Total
Louisville	7	7	7	7	28
USC	7	21	7	7	42
- Date: December 27, 2023
- Season: 2023
- Stadium: Petco Park
- Location: San Diego, California
- MVP: Off.: Miller Moss (QB, USC); Def.: Jaylin Smith (S, USC)
- Favorite: Louisville by 7.5
- Referee: Lee Hedrick (SEC)
- Attendance: 35,317

United States TV coverage
- Network: Fox
- Announcers: Gus Johnson, Joel Klatt, and Jenny Taft

The 2023 Holiday Bowl was a college football bowl game played on December 27, 2023, at Petco Park in San Diego, California. The 44th annual Holiday Bowl featured the Louisville Cardinals from the Atlantic Coast Conference (ACC) and the USC Trojans from the Pac-12 Conference. The game began at approximately 5:00 p.m. PST and was aired on Fox. It was one of the 2023–24 bowl games concluding the 2023 FBS football season. Sponsored by multichannel video programming distributor DirecTV, the game was officially known as the DirecTV Holiday Bowl.

== Teams ==
Consistent with conference tie-ins, the game featured teams from the Atlantic Coast Conference (ACC) and the Pac-12 Conference. This was the first-ever game between Louisville and USC.

=== Louisville Cardinals ===
The Cardinals entered the game with a 10–3 record (7–1 in ACC play) and No. 15 in the College Football Playoff rankings. Louisville finished second in the ACC but lost to Florida State in the ACC Championship Game, 16–6.

This was the Cardinals' first appearance in the Holiday Bowl.

=== USC Trojans ===
The Trojans entered the game with a 7–5 record (5–4 in Pac-12 play). USC finished tied for fourth place in their conference.

This was USC's final game as a member of the Pac-12, as the Trojans committed to move to the Big Ten Conference for the 2024 season.

USC made its fourth appearance in the Holiday Bowl, having previously won the 2014 edition and lost the 2015 edition and 2019 edition.

== Game summary ==
2023 DirecTV Holiday Bowl

Quarter	1	2	3	4	Total
No. 15 Louisville	7	7	7	7	28
USC	7	21	7	7	42

at Petco Park • San Diego

- Date: Wednesday, December 27, 2023
- Game time: 5:00 p.m. PST
- Game weather: Clear • Temperature: 61 °F (16 °C) • Wind: 5 mph (8.0 km/h) NW
- Game attendance: 35,317
- Referee: Lee Hedrick
- TV announcers (FOX): Gus Johnson (play-by-play), Joel Klatt (analyst), and Jenny Taft (sideline)
- Box score

Game information

First quarter

- (8:37) LOU – Isaac Guerendo 2-yard run, Nick Lopez kick (Drive: 10 plays, 71 yards, 5:10; Louisville 7–0)
- (4:25) USC – Tahj Washington 17-yard pass from Miller Moss, Denis Lynch kick (Drive: 3 plays, 19 yards, 1:33; Tied 7–7)

Second quarter

- (8:07) USC – Tahj Washington 29-yard pass from Miller Moss, Denis Lynch kick (Drive: 5 plays, 80 yards, 2:13; USC 14–7)
- (6:30) USC – Kyron Hudson 9-yard pass from Miller Moss, Denis Lynch kick (Drive: 2 plays, 18 yards, 0:39; USC 21–7)
- (1:56) LOU – Evan Conley 9-yard run, Nick Lopez kick (Drive: 9 plays, 73 yards, 4:34; USC 21–14)
- (0:19) USC – Ja'Kobi Lane 31-yard pass from Miller Moss, Denis Lynch kick (Drive: 3 plays, 34 yards, 1:15; USC 28–14)

Third quarter

- (9:43) LOU – Isaac Guerendo 1-yard run, Nick Lopez kick (Drive: 6 plays, 39 yards, 2:41; USC 28–21)
- (4:51) USC – Ja'Kobi Lane 12-yard pass from Miller Moss, Denis Lynch kick (Drive: 11 plays, 53 yards, 4:52; USC 35–21)

Fourth quarter

- (12:51) LOU – Isaac Guerendo 2-yard run, Nick Lopez kick (Drive: 12 plays, 72 yards, 7:00; USC 35–28)
- (10:00) USC – Duce Robinson 44-yard pass from Miller Moss, Denis Lynch kick (Drive: 7 plays, 75 yards, 2:51; USC 42–28)

=== Statistics ===
Statistics	LOU	USC
First downs	22	19
Plays–yards	70–361	52–443
Rushes–yards	45–220	19–71
Passing yards	141	372
Passing: comp–att–int	21–25–0	23–33–1
Time of possession	36:34	23:26

Team	Category	Player	Statistics
Louisville	Passing	Jack Plummer	21–25, 141 yds
Louisville	Rushing	Isaac Guerendo	23 cars, 161 yds, 3 TDs
Louisville	Receiving	Isaac Guerendo	5 rec, 42 yds
USC	Passing	Miller Moss	23–33, 372 yds, 6 TDs, 1 Int
USC	Rushing	Austin Jones	11 cars, 60 yds
USC	Receiving	Tahj Washington	7 rec, 99 yds, 2 TDs
