= 2026 USC Trojans football team =

American college football season

2026 USC Trojans football
- Conference: Big Ten Conference

Ranking
- Coaches: No. 19
- AP: No. 18
- CFP: No. 18
- Record: 8–3 (5–3 Big Ten)
- Head coach: Lincoln Riley (5th season)
- Offensive coordinator: Luke Huard (2nd season)
- Offensive scheme: Power raid
- Defensive coordinator: Gary Patterson (1st season)
- Base defense: 4–2–5
- Captains: Jayden Maiava; Kilian O'Connor; Tobias Raymond; Jide Abasiri; Alex VanSumeren
- Home stadium: Los Angeles Memorial Coliseum

Uniform

2026 Big Ten Conference football standings
	Conf.			Overall
Team	W		L	W		L
No. 4 UCLA	7	–	1	10	–	1
No. 8 Indiana	6	–	2	9	–	2
No. 15 Iowa	6	–	2	9	–	2
No. 13 Oregon	6	–	2	8	–	3
No. 18 USC	5	–	3	8	–	3
No. 14 Ohio State	5	–	3	7	–	4
Wisconsin	5	–	3	7	–	4
Nebraska	4	–	4	7	–	4
Washington	4	–	4	7	–	4
Illinois	4	–	4	6	–	5
Minnesota	4	–	4	6	–	5
Michigan	3	–	5	6	–	5
Northwestern	3	–	5	6	–	5
Penn State	3	–	5	6	–	5
Maryland	2	–	6	4	–	7
Purdue	2	–	6	3	–	8
Rutgers	2	–	6	3	–	8
Michigan State	1	–	7	3	–	8
Championship: December 5, 2026
^ – College Football Playoff participant; $ – Conference champion; y – Championship game participant; As of November 22, 2026; Rankings from CFP rankings

The 2026 USC Trojans football team represents the University of Southern California (USC) as a third-year member of the Big Ten Conference during the 2026 NCAA Division I FBS football season. Led by fifth-year head coach Lincoln Riley, the Trojans play home games at Los Angeles Memorial Coliseum located in Los Angeles.

== Schedule ==
Date	Time	Opponent	Rank	Site	TV	Result	Attendance
August 29	12:00 p.m.	San Jose State*	No. 14т	Los Angeles Memorial Coliseum; Los Angeles, CA	NBC	W 42–26	51,144
September 4	6:00 p.m.	Fresno State*	No. 14т	Los Angeles Memorial Coliseum; Los Angeles, CA	FOX	W 39–0	53,014
September 12	8:00 p.m.	Louisiana*	No. 14	Los Angeles Memorial Coliseum; Los Angeles, CA	BTN	W 49–30	60,019
September 19	12:30 p.m.	at Rutgers	No. 12	SHI Stadium; Piscataway, NJ	CBS	W 42–35	43,045
September 26	4:30 p.m.	No. 20 Oregon	No. 12	Los Angeles Memorial Coliseum; Los Angeles, CA (rivalry)	NBC	L 27–41	75,500
October 3	4:30 p.m.	Washington^{†}	No. 18	Los Angeles Memorial Coliseum; Los Angeles, CA	NBC	W 25–21	59,136
October 10	4:30 p.m.	at Penn State	No. 19	Beaver Stadium; University Park, PA	NBC	W 31–23	114,419
October 24	4:30 p.m.	at Wisconsin	No. 16	Camp Randall Stadium; Madison, WI	NBC	L 7–24	71,750
October 31	4:30 p.m.	No. 2 Ohio State		Los Angeles Memorial Coliseum; Los Angeles, CA	NBC	W 30–18	70,810
November 14	12:30 p.m.	at No. 9 Indiana	No. 18	Memorial Stadium; Bloomington, IN	CBS	L 13–27	54,336
November 21	3:15 p.m.	Maryland	No. 18	Los Angeles Memorial Coliseum; Los Angeles, CA	BTN	W 35–21	53,694
November 28	12:30 p.m.	at UCLA		Rose Bowl; Pasadena, CA (Victory Bell)	CBS		
*Non-conference game; ^{†}Homecoming; Rankings from AP Poll (and CFP Rankings, after November 3) – Released prior to game; All times are in Pacific time; Source:

== Rankings ==
Ranking movements Legend: ██ Increase in ranking ██ Decrease in ranking RV = Received votes т = Tied with team above or below
	Week															
Poll	Pre	1	2	3	4	5	6	7	8	9	10	11	12	13	14	Final
AP	14т	14	12	12	18	19	19	16	RV	18	15	18				
Coaches	14	14	11	12	18	17	15	15	25	17	14	19				
CFP	Not released									20	18	18				Not released

== Game summaries ==
=== vs San Jose State ===
San Jose State Spartans (0–0) at No. 14т USC Trojans (0–0) – Game summary

Quarter	1	2	3	4	Total
Spartans	0	0	3	23	26
No. 14т Trojans	7	21	7	7	42

at Los Angeles Memorial Coliseum • Los Angeles, California

- Date: August 29
- Game time: 12:00 pm PDT
- Game weather: Sunny • Temperature: 94 °F (34 °C) • Wind: SW at 7 miles per hour (11 km/h)
- Game attendance: 51,144
- Referee: Jim Wharrie
- TV announcers (NBC): Noah Eagle (Play-by-Play), Todd Blackledge (Color), and Kathryn Tappen (Sideline)
- Recap

Game information

First quarter

- (8:55) USC - Jayden Maiava 1-yard run (Chaden Chittenden kick) (Drive: 13 plays, 77 yards, 6:05; USC 7–0)

Second quarter

- (14:20) USC - Riley Wormley 5-yard run (Chaden Chittenden kick), (Drive: 8 plays, 43 yards, 3:46; USC 14–0)
- (2:46) USC - Kayden Dixon-Wyatt 9-yard pass from Jayden Maiava (Chaden Chittenden kick), (Drive: 12 plays, 91 yards, 5:35; USC 21–0)
- (0:30) - King Miller 4-yard run (Chaden Chittenden kick), (Drive: 6 plays, 80 yards, 1:14; USC 28–0)

Third quarter

- (7:15) SJSU - Trajan Sinatra 22-yard field goal (Drive: 9 plays, 69 yards, 3:17; USC 28–3)
- (2:28) USC - Trent Mosley 14-yard pass from Jayden Maiava (Chaden Chittenden kick), (Drive: 9 plays, 74 yards, 4:41; USC 35–3)

Fourth quarter

- (14:56) SJSU - Jerry McClure 28-yard pass from Luke Weaver (Luke Weaver–Kamaehu Kopa-Kaawalauole pass), (Drive: 5 plays, 68 yards, 2:26; USC 35–11)
- (9:42) USC - Shana Alston 1-yard run (Chaden Chittenden kick), (Drive: 10 plays, 75 yards, 5:14; USC 42–11)
- (5:11) SJSU - Jordan Anderson 3-yard pass from Luke Weaver (Trajan Sinatra kick), (Drive: 10 plays, 75 yards, 4:31; USC 42–18)
- (1:45) SJSU - Luke Weaver 7-yard run (Luke Weaver–Cooper Hoch pass), (Drive: 3 Plays, 35 yards, 0:39; USC 42–26)

Statistics	SJSU	USC
First downs	19	29
Plays–yards	56–336	76–505
Rushes–yards	24–102	40–164
Passing yards	234	341
Passing: comp–att–int	21–32–0	30–36–1
Turnovers	0	1
Time of possession	22:45	37:15

Team	Category	Player	Statistics
San Jose State	Passing	Luke Weaver	21/32, 234 yards, 2 TD
San Jose State	Rushing	Luke Weaver	8 carries, 42 yards, TD
San Jose State	Receiving	Carson Clark	6 receptions, 74 yards
USC	Passing	Jayden Maiava	25/29, 286 yards, 2 TD
USC	Rushing	King Miller	15 carries, 63 yards, TD
USC	Receiving	Trent Mosley	7 receptions, 118 yards, TD

=== vs Fresno State ===
Fresno State Bulldogs (0–0) at No. 14т USC Trojans (1–0) – Game summary

Quarter	1	2	3	4	Total
Bulldogs	0	0	0	0	0
No. 14т Trojans	7	23	2	7	39

at Los Angeles Memorial Coliseum • Los Angeles, California

- Date: September 4
- Game time: 6:00 pm PDT
- Game weather: Sunny • Temperature: 77 °F (25 °C) • Wind: SW at 7 miles per hour (11 km/h)
- Game attendance: 53,014
- Referee: Jason Gant
- TV announcers (FOX): Connor Onion (Play-by-Play), Robert Griffin III (Color) and Alexa Landestoy (Sideline)
- Recap

Game information

First quarter

- (9:27) USC - Tanook Hines 8-yard pass from Jayden Maiava (Caden Chittenden kick), (Drive: 12 plays, 82 yards, 5:33; USC 7-0)

Second quarter

- (12:27) USC - Trent Mosley 68-yard pass from Jayden Maiava (Caden Chitenden kick), (Drive: 4 plays, 83 yards, 1:45; USC 14-0)
- (7:09) USC - Jayden Mandal 1-yard sack by Kennedy Urlacher for a Safety (Drive: 3 plays, -13 yards, 1:03; USC 16-0)
- (4:07) USC - Trent Mosley 9-yard pass from Jayden Maiava (Caden Chitenden kick), (Drive: 5 plays, 65 yards, 2:56; USC 23-0)
- (0:11) USC - Waymond Jordan 2-yard run (Caden Chitenden kick), (Drive: 5 plays, 38 yards, 2:10; USC 30-0)

Third quarter

- (5:15) USC - Jayden Mandal 7-yard sack by Alex Graham (Drive: 1 play, -7 yards, 0:05; USC 32-0)

Fourth quarter

- (5:46) USC - Deshonne Redeaux 5-yard run (Caden Chitenden kick), (Drive: 10 plays, 79 yards, 6:47; USC 39-0)

Statistics	FRES	USC
First downs	9	27
Plays–yards	44–116	68–552
Rushes–yards	29–39	37–140
Passing yards	77	412
Passing: comp–att–int	7–15–1	29–31–0
Turnovers	2	2
Time of possession	21:08	38:52

Team	Category	Player	Statistics
Fresno State	Passing	Jayden Mandal	7/15, 77 yards, INT
Fresno State	Rushing	Rayshon Luke	8 carries, 21 yards
Fresno State	Receiving	Harold Duball	2 receptions, 34 yards
USC	Passing	Jayden Maiava	23/25, 349 yards, 3 TD
USC	Rushing	Waymond Jordan	11 carries, 67 yards, TD
USC	Receiving	Trent Mosley	4 receptions, 104 yards, 2 TD

=== vs Louisiana ===
Louisiana Ragin' Cajuns (0–1) at No. 14 USC Trojans (2–0) – Game summary

Quarter	1	2	3	4	Total
Ragin' Cajuns	3	7	7	13	30
No. 14 Trojans	7	21	7	14	49

at Los Angeles Memorial Coliseum • Los Angeles, California

- Date: September 12
- Game time: 8:00 pm PDT
- Game weather: Sunny • Temperature: 78 °F (26 °C) • Wind: SW at 7 miles per hour (11 km/h)
- Game attendance: 60,019
- Referee: Mark Kluczynski
- TV announcers (BTN): Mark Followill (Play-by-Play), Rhett Lewis (Color), and Caroline Hendershot (Sideline)
- Recap

Game information

First quarter

- (11:23) UL - Tony Sterner 47-yard field goal (Drive: 4 plays, 9 yards, 2:01; Louisiana 3-0)
- (4:57) USC - Mark Bowman 9-yard pass from Jayden Maiava (Caden Chittenden kick), (Drive: 13 plays, 79 yards, 6:21; USC 7-3)

Second quarter

- (12:31) USC - Mark Bowman 9 yard pass from Jayden Maiava (Caden Chittenden kick), (Drive: 10 plays, 77 yards, 5:28; USC 14-3)
- (9:21) UL - Steven Blanco 1-yard run (Tony Sterner kick), (Drive: 7 plays, 75 yards, 3:10; USC 14-10)
- (3:19) USC - Kayden Dixon-Wyatt 19-yard pass from Jayden Maiava (Caden Chittenden kick), (Drive: 12 plays, 87 yards, 6:02; USC 21-10)
- (1:24) USC - Trent Mosley 86-yard punt return (Caden Chittenden kick), (USC 28-10)

Third quarter

- (9:48) USC - Trent Mosley 21-yard pass from Jayden Maiava (Caden Chittenden kick), (Drive: 7 plays, 41 yards, 3:10; USC 35-10)
- (4:07) UL - Lunch Winfield 1-yard run (Tony Sterner kick), (Drive: 12 plays, 81 yards, 5:37; USC 35-17)

Fourth quarter

- (14:19) USC - Zacharyus Williams 44-yard pass from Jayden Maiava (Caden Chittenden kick), (Drive: 3 plays, 40 yards, 1:14; USC 42-17)
- (11:27) UL - Lunch Winfield 32-yard run (Two-Point Converstion pass to Lunch Winfield is no good), (Drive: 5 plays, 75 yards, 2:52; USC 42-23)
- (7:30) USC - King Miller 12-yard run (Caden Chittenden kick), (Drive: 7 plays, 75 yards, 3:57; USC 49-23)
- (2:38) UL - Russell Babineaux 14-yard pass from Lunch Winfield (Tony Sterner kick), (Drive: 8 plays, 75 yards, 4:52; USC 49-30)

Statistics	UL	USC
First downs	17	25
Plays–yards	52–358	71–483
Rushes–yards	30–146	40–214
Passing yards	212	269
Passing: comp–att–int	16–22–0	20–31–1
Turnovers	0	1
Time of possession	26:46	33:14

Team	Category	Player	Statistics
Louisiana	Passing	Lunch Winfield	16/22, 212 yards, TD
Louisiana	Rushing	Lunch Winfield	14 carries, 91 yards, 2 TD
Louisiana	Receiving	Russell Babineaux	6 receptions, 91 yards, TD
USC	Passing	Jayden Maiava	19/29, 261 yards, 5 TD, INT
USC	Rushing	King Miller	18 carries, 128 yards, TD
USC	Receiving	Mark Bowman	6 receptions, 83 yards, 2 TD

=== at Rutgers ===
No. 12 USC Trojans (3–0) at Rutgers Scarlet Knights (0–2) – Game summary

Quarter	1	2	3	4	Total
No. 12 Trojans	10	10	15	7	42
Scarlet Knights	7	7	14	7	35

at SHI Stadium • Piscataway, New Jersey

- Date: September 19
- Game time: 12:30 pm PDT
- Game weather: Sunny • Temperature: 76 °F (24 °C) • Wind: S at 5 miles per hour (8.0 km/h)
- Game attendance: 43,045
- Referee: Jim Wharrie
- TV announcers (CBS): Brad Nessler (Play-by-Play), Charles Davis (Color), and Jenny Dell (Sideline)
- Recap

Game information

First Quarter

- (9:30) USC - Caden Chittenden 35-yard field goal (Drive: 12 plays, 58 yards, 5:30; USC 3-0)
- (8:08) USC - King Miller 11-yard rush (Chaden Chittenden kick), (Drive: 2 plays, 24 yards, 0:35; USC 10-0)
- (0:04) Rutgers - KJ Duff 11-yard pass from Dylan Lonergan (Dane Pizzaro kick), (Drive: 12 plays, 75 yards, 8:04; USC 10-7)

Second Quarter

- (11:59) USC - Cory Simms 52-yard pass from Jayden Maiava (Chaden Chittenden kick), (Drive: 6 plays, 75 yards, 3:05; USC 17-7)
- (1:25) Rutgers - Elias Coke 16-yard pass from Dylan Lonergan (Dane Pizzaro kick), (Drive: 14 plays, 95 yards, 6:35; USC 17-14)
- (0:10) USC - Chaden Chittenden 32-yard field goal (Drive: 8 plays, 61 yards, 1:15; USC 20-14)

Third Quarter

- (10:32) USC - Prophet Brown returns a 99-yard interception for a Touchdown (USC 27-14)
- (8:53) Rutgers - Clay Thevenin 17-yard rush (Dane Pizzaro kick), (Drive: 3 plays, 75 yards, 1:39; USC 27-21)
- (5:52) USC - Riley Wormley 12-yard rush (Jayden Maiava–Kayden Dixon-Wyatt pass), (Drive: 7 plays, 75 yards, 3:01; USC 35-21)
- (1:07) Rutgers - Antwan Raymond 2-yard rush (Dane Pizzaro kick), (Drive: 8 plays, 75 yards, 4:45; USC 35-28)

Fourth Quarter

- (8:35) USC - Riley Wormley 2-yard pass from Jayden Maiava (Chaden Chittenden kick), (Drive: 5 plays, 24 yards, 3:04; USC 42-28)
- (4:24) Rutgers - Vernon Allen II 28-yard pass from Dylan Lonergan (Dane Pizzaro kick), (Drive: 12 plays, 75 yards, 4:17; USC 42-35)

Statistics	USC	RUTG
First downs	24	27
Plays–yards	63–461	69–460
Rushes–yards	31–184	32–168
Passing yards	277	292
Passing: comp–att–int	20–32–0	19–37–2
Turnovers	0	2
Time of possession	26:45	33:15

Team	Category	Player	Statistics
USC	Passing	Jayden Maiava	20/32, 277 yards, 2 TDs
USC	Rushing	King Miller	16 carries, 102 yards, TD
USC	Receiving	Kayden Dixon-Wyatt	5 receptions, 77 yards
Rutgers	Passing	Dylan Lonergan	18/36, 252 yards, 3 TDs, 2 INTs
Rutgers	Rushing	Antwan Raymond	21 carries, 122 yards, TD
Rutgers	Receiving	KJ Duff	7 receptions, 86 yards, TD

=== vs No. 20 Oregon (rivalry) ===
No. 20 Oregon Ducks (2–1) at No. 12 USC Trojans (4–0) – Game summary

Quarter	1	2	3	4	Total
No. 20 Ducks	3	10	14	14	41
No. 12 Trojans	0	10	10	7	27

at Los Angeles Memorial Coliseum • Los Angeles, California

- Date: September 26
- Game time: 4:30 pm PDT
- Game weather: Sunny • Temperature: 88 °F (31 °C) • Wind: SW at 7 miles per hour (11 km/h)
- Game attendance: 75,500
- Referee: Bryan Banks
- TV announcers (NBC): Noah Eagle (Play-by-Play), Todd Blackledge (Color), and Kathryn Tappen (Sideline)
- Recap

Game information

First Quarter

- (3:34) Oregon - Gage Hurych 30-yard field goal (Drive: 10 plays, 68 yards, 5:31; Oregon 3-0)

Second Quarter

- (12:53) USC - Kayden Dixon-Wyatt 31-yard pass from Jayden Maiava (Chaden Chittenden kick) (Drive: 4 plays, 58 yards, 1:15; USC 7-3)
- (9:05) Oregon - Evan Stewart 3-yard pass from Dylan Raiola (Gage Hurych kick), (Drive: 9 plays, 75 yards, 3:49; Oregon 10-7)
- (5:32) USC - Chaden Chittenden 38-yard field goal (Drive: 8 plays, 44 yards, 3:32; Tied 10-10)
- (0:01) Oregon - Gage Hurych 19-yard field goal (Drive: 16 plays, 76 yards, 5:26; Oregon 13-10)

Third Quarter

- (13:04) Oregon - Dierre Hill Jr. 1-yard rush (Gage Hurych kick), (Drive: 4 plays, 75 yards, 1:56; Oregon 20-10)
- (8:33) USC - Jayden Maiava 1-yard rush (Chaden Chittenden kick), (Drive: 9 plays, 75 yards, 4:31; Oregon 20-17)
- (5:52) Oregon - Dierre Hill Jr. 4-yard rush (Gage Hurych kick), (Drive: 7 plays, 75 yards, 2:41; Oregon 27-17)
- (1:32) USC - Chaden Chittenden 29-yard field goal (Drive: 10 plays, 63 yards, 4:20; Oregon 27-20)

Fourth Quarter

- (12:41) USC - Tanook Hines 11-yard pass from Jayden Maiava (Chade Chittenden kick), (Drive: 7 plays, 75 yards, 2:28; Tied 27-27)
- (8:35) Oregon - Dakorien Moore 29-yard pass from Dylan Raiola (Gage Hurych kick), (Drive: 9 plays, 75 yards, 4:06; Oregon 34-27)
- (2:03) Oregon - Jordan Davison 2-yard rush (Gage Hurych kick), (Drive: 8 plays, 49 yards, 5:12; Oregon 41-27)

Statistics	ORE	USC
First downs	23	26
Plays–yards	68–504	75–446
Rushes–yards	33–138	33–120
Passing yards	366	326
Passing: comp–att–int	27–35–0	23–42–1
Turnovers	0	1
Time of possession	31:25	28:35

Team	Category	Player	Statistics
Oregon	Passing	Dylan Raiola	19/25, 289 yards, 2 TDs
Oregon	Rushing	Jordon Davison	16 carries, 66 yards, TD
Oregon	Receiving	Jamari Johnson	7 receptions, 119 yards
USC	Passing	Jayden Maiava	23/43, 326 yards, 2 TDs, 1 INT
USC	Rushing	King Miller	13 carries, 74 yards
USC	Receiving	Kayden Dixon-Wyatt	7 receptions, 114 yards, TD

=== vs Washington ===
Washington Huskies (3–1) at No. 18 USC Trojans (4–1) – Game summary

Quarter	1	2	3	4	Total
Huskies	7	7	7	0	21
No. 18 Trojans	3	7	12	3	25

at Los Angeles Memorial Coliseum • Los Angeles, California

- Date: October 3
- Game time: 4:30 pm PDT
- Game weather: Sunny • Temperature: 98 °F (37 °C) • Wind: SW at 10 miles per hour (16 km/h)
- Game attendance: 59,136
- Referee: Jason Nickleby
- TV announcers (NBC): Noah Eagle (Play-by-Play), Todd Blackledge (Color), and Kathryn Tappen (Sideline)
- Recap

Game information

First Quarter

- (8:35) USC - Caden Chittenden 26-yard field goal (Drive: 9 plays, 75 yards, 5:04; USC 3-0)
- (1:46) Washington - Baron Naone 5-yard pass from Dezmen Roebuck (Tyler Robles kick), (Drive: 8 plays, 41 yards, 4:21; Washington 7-3)

Second Quarter

- (9:58) USC - Waymond Jordan 8-yard rush (Caden Chittenden kick), (Drive: 5 plays, 61 yards, 2:37; USC 10-7)
- (1:50) Washington - Cade Eldridge 1-yard rush (Tyler Robles kick), (Drive: 8 plays, 80 yards, 3:25; Washington 14-10)

Third Quarter

- (13:30) Washington - Decker DeGraaf 42-yard pass from Demond Williams Jr. (Tyler Robles kick), (Drive: 2 plays, 60 yards, 0:48; Washington 21-10)
- (6:30) USC - Tanook Hines 10-yard pass from Jayden Maiava (Jonas Williams Two-Point Conversation rush is no good), (Drive: 13 plays, 75 yards, 7:00; Washington 21-16)
- (4:40) USC - Jahkeem Stewart 48-yard fumble recovery (Boobie Feaster Two-Point Conversation rush is no good), (USC 22-21)

Fourth Quarter

- (9:36) USC - Caden Chittenden 39-yard field goal (Drive: 16 plays, 77 yards, 7:59; USC 25-21)

Statistics	WASH	USC
First downs	15	21
Plays–yards	60–319	69–360
Rushes–yards	33–116	35–115
Passing yards	203	245
Passing: comp–att–int	16–27–0	21–34–1
Turnovers	1	1
Time of possession	25:02	34:58

Team	Category	Player	Statistics
Washington	Passing	Demond Williams Jr.	15/26, 198 yards, TD
Washington	Rushing	Brian Bonner Jr.	19 carries, 89 yards
Washington	Receiving	Chris Lawson	5 receptions, 82 yards
USC	Passing	Jayden Maiava	21/34, 245 yards, TD, INT
USC	Rushing	King Miller	18 carries, 81 yards
USC	Receiving	Tanook Hines	6 receptions, 51 yards, TD

=== at Penn State ===
No. 19 USC Trojans (5–1) at Penn State Nittany Lions (3–2) – Game summary

Quarter	1	2	3	4	Total
No. 19 Trojans	7	10	7	7	31
Nittany Lions	7	10	3	3	23

at Beaver Stadium • University Park, Pennsylvania

- Date: October 10
- Game time: 4:30 pm PDT
- Game weather: Cloudy • Temperature: 59 °F (15 °C) • Wind: E at 9 miles per hour (14 km/h)
- Game attendance: 114,419
- Referee: Jeff Servinski
- TV announcers (NBC): Noah Eagle (Play-by-Play), Todd Blackledge (Color), and Kathryn Tappen (Sideline)
- Recap

Game information

First Quarter

- (10:37) USC - Trent Mosley 19-yard pass from Jayden Maiava (Caden Chittenden kick), (Drive: 8 plays, 75 yards, 4:23; USC 7-0)
- (7:26) Penn State - Andrew Rappleyea 13-yard pass from Rocco Becht (Ryan Barker kick) (Drive: 6 plays, 75 yards, 3:11; Tied 7-7)

Second Quarter

- (13:36) USC - Tanook Hines 11-yard pass from Jayden Maiava (Caden Chittenden kick), (Drive: 8 plays, 80 yards, 2:55; USC 14-7)
- (9:59) Penn State - Carson Hansen 3-yard rush (Ryan Barker kick), (Drive: 7 plays, 75 yards, 3:37; Tied 14-14)
- (2:11) USC - Caden Chittenden 37-yard field goal (Drive: 9 plays, 70 yards, 4:04; USC 17-14)
- (0:00) Penn State - Ryan Barker 48-yard field goal (Drive: 8 plays, 45 yards, 2:11; Tied 17-17)

Third Quarter

- (11:23) Penn State - Ryan Barker 35-yard field goal (Drive: 8 plays, 31 yards, 3:37; Penn State 17-14)
- (5:38) USC - King Miller 13-yard rush (Caden Chittenden kick), (Drive: 10 plays, 75 yards, 5:45; USC 24-20)

Fourth Quarter

- (14:52) Penn State - Ryan Barker 26-yard field goal (Drive: 13 plays, 58 yards, 5:46; USC 24-23')
- (11:11) USC - Kayden Dixon-Wyatt 10-yard pass from Jayden Maiava (Caden Chittenden kick), (Drive: 10 plays, 71 yards, 3:36; USC 31-23)

Statistics	USC	PSU
First downs	25	18
Plays–yards	63–430	63–357
Rushes–yards	30–129	31–68
Passing yards	301	289
Passing: comp–att–int	21–33–0	21–32–0
Turnovers	0	1
Time of possession	30:08	29:52

Team	Category	Player	Statistics
USC	Passing	Jayden Maiava	21/33, 301 yards, 3 TD
USC	Rushing	King Miller	19 carries, 102 yards, TD
USC	Receiving	Trent Mosley	9 receptions, 111 yards, TD
Penn State	Passing	Rocco Becht	21/32, 289 yards, TD
Penn State	Rushing	Carson Hansen	14 carries, 28 yards, TD
Penn State	Receiving	Chase Sowell	4 receptions, 95 yards

=== at Wisconsin ===
No. 16 USC Trojans (6–1) at Wisconsin Badgers (4–2) – Game summary

Quarter	1	2	3	4	Total
No. 16 Trojans	0	7	0	0	7
Badgers	3	7	7	7	24

at Camp Randall Stadium • Madison, Wisconsin

- Date: October 24
- Game time: 4:30 p.m.
- Game weather: Partly Cloudy • Temperature: 67 °F (19 °C) • Wind: SE at 9 miles per hour (14 km/h)
- Game attendance: 71,750
- Referee: Tim O'Day
- TV announcers (NBC): Noah Eagle (Play-by-Play), Todd Blackledge (Color), and Kathryn Tappen (Sideline)

Game information

First Quarter

- (7:20) Wisconsin - Gavin Lahm 33-yard field goal (Drive: 4 plays, 2 yards, 0:52; Wisconsin 3-0)

Second Quarter

- (9:44) USC - Taniela Tupou 4-yard pass from Jayden Maiava (Chaden Chittenden kick), (Drive: 14 plays, 67 yards, 7:01; USC 7-0)
- (1:51) Wisconsin - Bryan Jackson II 5-yard rush (Gavin Lahm kick), (Drive: 13 plays, 75 yards, 7:53; Wisconsin 10-7)

Third Quarter

- (9:36) Wisconsin - Chris Brooks Jr. 16-yard pass from Colton Joseph (Gavin Lahm kick), (Drive: 10 plays, 75 yards, 5:39; Wisconsin 17-7)

Fourth Quarter

- (5:02) Wisconsin - Ryan Schwendeman 1-yard rush (Gavin Lahm kick), (Drive: 13 plays, 59 yards, 8:12; Wisconsin 24-7)
- (:) - (), (Drive: , , ; )

Statistics	USC	WISC
First downs	22	16
Plays–yards	75–241	57–200
Rushes–yards	25–(-17)	43–143
Passing yards	258	58
Passing: comp–att–int	31–50–2	12–14–0
Time of possession	27:24	32:36

Team	Category	Player	Statistics
USC	Passing	Jayden Maiava	31/50, 258 yards, TD, 2 INT
USC	Rushing	Shahn Alston	7 carries, 28 yards
USC	Receiving	Taniela Tupou	6 receptions, 46 yards, TD
Wisconsin	Passing	Colton Joseph	12/14, 58 yards, TD
Wisconsin	Rushing	Abu Sama	17 carries, 71 yards
Wisconsin	Receiving	Eugene Hilton Jr.	3 receptions, 18 yards

=== vs No. 2 Ohio State ===
No. 2 Ohio State Buckeyes (6–1) at USC Trojans (6–2) – Game summary

Quarter	1	2	3	4	Total
No. 2 Buckeyes	3	6	0	9	18
Trojans	14	6	7	3	30

at Los Angeles Memorial Coliseum • Los Angeles, California

- Date: October 31
- Game time: 4:30 p.m.
- Game weather: Cloudy • Temperature: 70 °F (21 °C) • Wind: SW at 2 miles per hour (3.2 km/h)
- Game attendance: 70,810
- Referee: Kole Knueppel
- TV announcers (NBC): Noah Eagle (Play-by-Play), Todd Blackledge (Color) and Kathryn Tappen (Sideline)
- Recap
  Highlights

Game information

First Quarter

- (14:21) USC - Trent Mosley 69-yard pass from Jayden Maiava (Caden Chittenden kick), (Drive: 2 plays, 75 yards, 0:39; USC 7-0)
- (8:27) Ohio State - Connor Hawkins 39-yard field goal (Drive: 11 plays, 54 yards, 5:48; USC 7-3)
- (2:25) USC - Waymond Jordan 9-yard rush (Caden Chittenden kick), (Drive: 4 plays, 31 yards, 1:43; USC 14-3)

Second Quarter

- (13:22) Ohio State - Connor Hawkins 34-yard field goal (Drive: 8 plays, 59 yards, 4:03; USC 14-6)
- (10:21) USC - Ryon Sayeri 54-yard field goal (Drive: 9 plays, 38 yards, 3:01; USC 17-6)
- (1:46) Ohio State - Connor Hawkins 23-yard field goal (Drive: 13 plays, 53 yards, 4:09; USC 17-9)
- (0:01) USC - Caden Chittenden 36-yard field goal (Drive: 10 plays, 56 yards, 1:45; USC 20-9)

Third Quarter

- (6:11) USC - King Miller 1-yard rush (Caden Chittenden kick), (Drive: 3 plays, 68 yards, 1:36; USC 27-9)

Fourth Quarter

- (14:56) Ohio State - Connor Hawkins 47-yard field goal (Drive: 12 plays, 46 yards, 6:15; USC 27-12)
- (2:12) Ohio State - Jeremiah Smith 1-yard pass from Luke Fahey (Two-Point Conversation pass from Luke Fahey is no good), (Drive: 13 plays, 80 yards, 5:45; USC 27-18)
- (1:46) USC - Caden Chittenden 32-yard field goal (Drive: 4 plays, 6 yards, 0:23; USC 30-18)

Statistics	OSU	USC
First downs	25	15
Plays–yards	81–464	50–338
Rushes–yards	43–204	27–116
Passing yards	260	222
Passing: comp–att–int	21–38–0	15–23–0
Time of possession	39:28	20:32

Team	Category	Player	Statistics
Ohio State	Passing	Luke Fahey	21-38, 260 yards, TD
Ohio State	Rushing	Bo Jackson	21 carries, 121 yards
Ohio State	Receiving	Jeremiah Smith	10 receptions, 83 yards, TD
USC	Passing	Jayden Maiava	15-22, 222 yards, TD
USC	Rushing	King Miller; Waymond Jordan	13 carries, 78 yards, TD; 12 carries, 48 yards, TD
USC	Receiving	Trent Mosley	5 receptions, 101 yards, TD

=== at No. 9 Indiana ===
No. 18 USC Trojans (7–2) at No. 9 Indiana Hoosiers (8–1) – Game summary

Quarter	1	2	3	4	Total
No. 18 Trojans	3	7	3	0	13
No. 9 Hoosiers	7	3	10	7	27

at Memorial Stadium • Bloomington, Indiana

- Date: November 14
- Game time: 12:30 p.m.
- Game weather: Sunny • Temperature: 47 °F (8 °C) • Wind: NW at 10 miles per hour (16 km/h)
- Game attendance: 54,336
- Referee: Bryan Banks
- TV announcers (CBS): Brad Nessler (Play-by-Play), Charles Davis (Color), and Jenny Dell (Sideline)

Game information

First Quarter

- (8:18) Indiana - Brock Schott 13-yard pass from Grant Wilson (Nico Radicic kick), (Drive: 6 plays, 65 yards, 2:19; Indiana 7-0)
- (2:02) USC - Chaden Chittenden 29 yard field goal (Drive: 12 plays, 63 yards, 6:16; Indiana 7-3)

Second Quarter

- (1:45) Indiana - Nico Radicic 21-yard field goal (Drive: 9 plays, 29 yards, 3:46; Indiana 10-3)
- (0:21) USC - Zacharyus Williams 7-yard pass from Jayden Maiava (Chaden Chittenden kick), (Drive: 3 plays, 60 yards, 0:18; Tied 10-10)

Third Quarter

- (10:02) Indiana - Nico Radicic 24-yard field goal (Drive: 11 plays, 66 yards, 4:51; Indiana 13-10)
- (4:27) USC - Chaden Chittenden 25-yard field goal (Drive: 11 plays, 67 yards, 5:35; Tied 13-13)
- (2:39) Indiana - Khobie Martin 1-yard rush (Nico Radicic kick), (Drive: 5 plays, 75 yards, 1:48; Indiana 20-13)

Fourth Quarter

- (3:30) Indiana - Charlie Becker 42-yard pass from Grant Wilson (Nico Radicic kick), (Drive: 7 plays, 93 yards, 3:05; Indiana 27-13)

Statistics	USC	IU
First downs	21	18
Plays–yards	409	451
Rushes–yards	25–98	35–146
Passing yards	311	305
Passing: comp–att–int	26–42–3	17–27–1
Time of possession	30:12	29:48

Team	Category	Player	Statistics
USC	Passing	Jayden Maiava	26/42, 311 yards, 1 TD, 3 INT
USC	Rushing	Waymond Jordan	13 carries, 51 yards
USC	Receiving	Trent Mosley	9 receptions, 130 yards
Indiana	Passing	Grant Wilson	17/27, 305 yards, 2 TD, 1 INT
Indiana	Rushing	Khobie Martin	12 carries, 82 yards, 1 TD
Indiana	Receiving	Nick Marshall	4 receptions, 80 yards

=== vs Maryland ===
Maryland Terrapins (4–6) at No. 18 USC Trojans (7–3) – Game summary

Quarter	1	2	3	4	Total
Terrapins	0	14	0	7	21
No. 18 Trojans	10	3	7	15	35

at Los Angeles Memorial Coliseum • Los Angeles, California

- Date: November 21
- Game time: 3:15 p.m.
- Game weather:
- Game attendance:
- Referee: Chris Coyte
- TV announcers (BTN): Wayne Randazzo (Play-by-Play), Rhett Lewis (Color) and Caroline Hendershot (Sideline)

Statistics	MD	USC
First downs		
Plays–yards		
Rushes–yards		
Passing yards		
Passing: comp–att–int		
Time of possession		

Team	Category	Player	Statistics
Maryland	Passing		
Maryland	Rushing		
Maryland	Receiving		
USC	Passing		
USC	Rushing		
USC	Receiving		

=== at No. TBD UCLA ===
No. TBD USC Trojans (8–3) at No. TBD UCLA Bruins (10–1) – Game summary

Quarter	1	2	Total
Trojans			0
Bruins			0

at Rose Bowl • Pasadena, California

- Date: November 28
- Game time: 12:30 p.m.
- Game weather:
- Game attendance:
- Referee:
- TV announcers (CBS): Brad Nessler (Play-by-Play), Charles Davis (Color) and Jenny Dell (Sideline)

Statistics	USC	UCLA
First downs		
Plays–yards		
Rushes–yards		
Passing yards		
Passing: comp–att–int		
Time of possession		

Team	Category	Player	Statistics
USC	Passing		
USC	Rushing		
USC	Receiving		
UCLA	Passing		
UCLA	Rushing		
UCLA	Receiving		

== Personnel ==
=== Roster and coaching staff ===
2026 USC Trojans football team roster
Players
Coaches
Offense

Pos.	#	Name	Class
WR	0	Zacharyus Williams	So
WR	1	Boobie Feaster	Fr
RB	2	Waymond Jordan	Sr
WR	4	Trent Mosley	Fr
RB	6	Deshonne Redeaux	Fr
QB	7	Sam Huard	Sr
RB	8	King Miller	So
WR	9	Terrell Anderson	Jr
WR	10	Corey Simms	So
QB	14	Jayden Maiava	Sr
QB	15	Jonas Williams	Fr
WR	16	Tanook Hines	So
WR	17	Kayden Dixon-Wyatt	Fr
WR	18	Romero Ison	Fr
TE	19	Mark Bowman	Fr
QB	21	Alex Medyn	Fr
RB	22	Shahn Alston	Fr
TE	23	Walter Matthews	So
TE	24	Carson Tabaracci	Sr
RB	27	Riley Wormley	Fr
QB	28	James Johnson	Fr
QB	29	Will Doherty	Jr
RB	30	Kayne Miller	Fr
WR	31	Seth Zamora	So
RB	34	Tyson Park	Fr
TE	38	Patrick O’Brien	So
WR	40	Marcus Sung	Jr
RB	41	Cian McKelvey	Jr
TE	44	Manoah Leiato	Fr
WR	49	Grant Woods	Fr
OL	51	Vlad Dyakonov	Fr
OL	52	Willi Wascher	Fr
OL	56	Kannon Smith	Fr
OL	57	Esun Tafa	Fr
OL	60	Kaylon Miller	So
OL	62	Travis Leonard	So
OL	63	Cash Jacobsen	Fr
OL	64	Ryan Pauley	Sr
OL	65	Erwin Taomi	Jr
OL	66	Breck Kolojay	Fr
OL	67	Kilian O'Connor	Sr
OL	68	Hayden Treter	So
OL	70	Aaron Dunn	Fr
OL	71	Keenyi Pepe	Fr
OL	72	Elijah Paige	Jr
OL	73	Tobias Raymond	Jr
OL	74	Justin Tauanuu	So
OL	75	Ratumana Bulabalavu	So
OL	76	John Fifita	Fr
OL	77	Alani Noa	Sr
OL	78	Chase Deniz	Fr
OL	79	Elijah Vaikona	Fr
WR	80	Luc Weaver	Fr
WR	81	Cam Sermons	Fr
WR	82	Roderick Tezeno Jr.	Fr
TE	83	Fisher Melton	Fr
TE	84	Tucker Ashcraft	Jr
WR	85	Tron Baker	Fr
WR	86	Luke Degner	Sr
TE	87	Josiah Jefferson	Jr
TE	88	Taniela Tupou	Fr
WR	89	Griffin Brahm	Fr
WR	-	Jaden Lyons	Sr

Defense

Pos.	#	Name	Class
CB	0	Jontez Williams	Sr
DE	1	Kameryn Crawford	Jr
CB	2	Elbert Hill IV	Fr
DT	4	Jahkeem Stewart	So
S	6	Christian Pierce	Sr
CB	7	Alex Graham	Fr
LB	8	Desman Stephens II	Jr
S	9	Kennedy Urlacher	Jr
DE	10	Braylan Shelby	Sr
LB	14	Ta'Mere Robinson	Jr
LB	15	Jadyn Walker	So
CB	16	Prophet Brown	Sr
LB	17	Deven Bryant	Jr
DE	18	Zuriah Fisher	Sr
CB	19	Brandon Lockhart	Fr
CB	21	RJ Sermons	Fr
LB	22	Talanoa Ili	Fr
S	23	Kendarius Reddick	So
LB	24	Shaun Scott	Fr
CB	25	Marcelles Williams	So
LB	26	Elijah Newby	So
CB	27	Chasen Johnson	So
CB	28	Carrington Pierce	So
CB	29	Joshua Holland II	Fr
S	30	Marquis Gallegos	So
S	31	Madden Riordan	Fr
CB	34	Jayden Crowder	Fr
DE	35	Ty Swanson	Fr
S	36	Peyton Dyer	Fr
CB	37	Trestin Castro	Fr
S	38	Isaiah Rubin	So
S	39	Peter Sciarrino	Fr
CB	40	Shawn Sehra	Jr
CB	41	Derek Diniz	Fr
DT	44	Braeden Jones	Fr
DT	45	Jaimeon Winfield	Fr
LB	46	Nick De Fina	Sr
LB	47	Austin Engroff	Fr
DE	49	Simote Katoanga	Fr
LB	50	Taylor Johnson	Fr
DE	51	Andrew Williams	Fr
DT	52	Tomuhini Topui Jr.	Fr
DE	54	Ethan Brougham	Jr
LB	56	Ryan O’Connell	Sr
LB	57	Roman Marchetti	Sr
LB	58	GianCarlo Rufo	Sr
DT	88	Floyd Boucard	So
DT	89	Brendan Cho	So
DT	90	Jake Johnson	Fr
DT	91	Alex VanSumeren	Sr
DE	92	Samuel Smith	Fr
DE	94	Luke Wafle	Fr
DE	95	Jadyn Ramos	Fr
DT	96	Jordan Abarca	So
DT	97	Jide Abasiri	Jr
DT	99	Jamaal Jarrett	Jr
DT	-	Malik Brooks	Fr
LB	-	Luca Torti	Sr

Special teams

Pos.	#	Name	Class
P	35	Lachlan Carrigan	So
P	36	Rey Sanchez	Sr
P	37	Zachary Nandlal	So
P	39	Nate Hillenburg	Sr
K	45	Caden Chittenden	So
LS	46	Dylan Black	Sr
LS	47	Caleb Moser	Sr
K	48	Ryon Sayeri	So
LS	53	Luke Brown	Fr
P	93	Will Weisberg	Fr

Head coach

- Lincoln Riley

Coordinators/assistant coaches

- Mike Ekeler – Special teams coordinator/linebackers
- Paul Gonzales – Safeties/defensive pass game coordinator
- Zach Hanson – Offensive line/run game coordinator
- Luke Huard – Offensive coordinator/quarterbacks
- Anthony Jones Jr. – Assistant HC offense/running backs
- Skyler Jones – Defensive tackles
- Shaun Nua – Defensive ends
- Gary Patterson – Defensive coordinator
- Trovon Reed – Cornerbacks
- Chad Savage – Tight ends/inside wide receivers/passing game coordinator
- Dennis Simmons – Assistant HC/co-offensive coordinator/wide receivers
- Sam Carter – Assistant secondary coach/nickels
- Ryan Dougherty – co-special teams coordinator/specialists coach
- AJ Howard – Outside linebackers
- Chris Meyers – Assistant coach offensive line & tight ends coach/run game specialist
- Rob Ryan – Assistant HC defense
- Trumain Carroll – Director of football sports performances
- Chad Bowden – General manager
- Dre Brown – Assistant general manager

- Asante Das – Offensive analyst (WR)
- John McDonnell – Senior offensive analyst (OL)
- Spencer Jones – Offensive analyst (QB)
- Noah Knoell – Special teams/defensive analyst
- Lee Morris – Offensive analyst (WR)
- Dakota Prukop – Defensive analyst/defensive game strategy specialist
- Derrick Baker – Assistant director of football sports performance
- Lonnie Maddox – Associate director of football sports performance
- Caesar Martinez – Assistant director of football sports performance
- Ray Thomas – Assistant strength and conditioning coach/director of speed development
- Connor Killian – Director of game management/offensive assistant
- Jackson Polk – Director of sports science
- Eric Espinoza – Director of football video operations
- Conor McQuiston – Director of football analytics
- Spencer Missioreck – Football video & systems analyst

Legend

- (C) Team captain
- (S) Suspended
- (I) Ineligible
- Injured
- Redshirt

Roster
Last update: 7/30/25

=== Depth chart ===
Defense
4-3

FS
Christian Pierce
Marquis Gallegos OR Madden Riordan*

WILL	MIKE	Nickel
Deven Bryant OR Jadyn Walker	Desman Stephens II	Alex Graham OR Kennedy Urlacher
Talanoa Ili	Ta’Mere Robinson	Isaiah Rubin

SS
Prophet Brown
Madden Riordan*

CB
Jontez Williams
Marcelles Williams OR RJ Sermons

DE	DT	DT	DE
Kameryn Crawford	Jide Abasiri	Alex VanSumeren	Luke Wafle
Zuriah Fisher	Jahkeem Stewart; Tomuhini “Tom Tom” Topui Jr.	Floyd Boucard	Braylan Shelby; Jadyn Ramos

CB
Chasen Johnson OR
Elbert “Rock” Hill IV

Offense
Pro-style

WR
Tanook Hines OR
Tron Baker

WR
Kayden Dixon-Wyatt
Ethan “Boobie” Feaster

LT	LG	C	RG	RT
Elijah Paige	Hayden Treter OR Kaylon Miller	Tobias Raymond	Alani Noa	Justin Tauanuu
Vlad Dyakonov	Breck Kolojay	Willi Wascher	Kaylon Miller	Aaron Dunn

TE
Mark Bowman
Tucker Ashcraft OR Carson Tabaracci OR Taniela Tupou

WR
Trent Mosley
Zacharyus Williams

QB
Jayden Maiava
Sam Huard OR Jonas Williams

Key reserves
Offense
Defense
Special teams
Out (indefinitely)
Out (season injury)
OL Kilian O’Connor
WR Corey Simms
WR Terrell Anderson
Out (redshirting)
Out (suspended)
Out (retired)

RB
Waymond Jordan OR King Miller
Riley Wormley
Shahn Alston
Deshonne Redeaux

Special teams
PK Caden Chittenden
PK Ryon Sayeri (KOS)
P Lachlan Carrigan
KR -
PR -
LS Luke Brown
H Lachlan Carrigan

True Freshman
Double Position : * official Depth Chart (09/10/2026)

=== Injury and Redshirting report ===
Name	Position	Class	Injury	Duration
Kilian O'Connor	OL	(redshirt) Senior	non-contact	Season
Corey Simms	WR	Sophomore	Knee	Season
Terrell Anderson	WR	Junior	Undisclosed	Season

=== Scholarship distribution chart ===
Position/Year	Freshman (46)	Sophomore (21)	Junior (13)	Senior (14)	2027 commit (14)	2028 commit (1)
QB 3 (1)	Jonas Williams	-	-	Sam Huard; Jayden Maiava	-	Trey Wright
RB 5 (1)	Shahn Alston; Deshonne Redeaux; Riley Wormley	King Miller	-	Waymond Jordan Jr.	Javon Vital Jr.	-
WR 11 (2)	Ja’Myron Baker; Kayden Dixon-Wyatt; Boobie Feaster; Romero Ison; Trent Mosley; Roderick Tezeno Jr. Luc Weaver	Tanook Hines; Corey Simms; Zacharyus Williams	Terrell Anderson	-	Quentin Hale; Roye Oliver III	-
TE 6 (1)	Mark Bowman; Taniela Tupou	Walter Matthews	Tucker Ashcraft; Josiah Jefferson	Carson Tabaracci	Jace Cannon	-
OL 19 (1)	Chase Deniz; Aaron Dunn; Vlad Dyakonov; John Fifita; Breck Kolojay; Keenyi Pepe; Kannon Smith; Esun Tafa; Elijah Vaikona; Willi Wascher	Ratumana Bulabalavu; Kaylon Miller; Justin Tauanuu; Hayden Treter	Elijah Paige; Tobias Raymond; Erwin Taomi	Alani Noa; Kilian O'Connor	Drew Fielder	-
DL 11 (12)	Malik Brooks; Cash Jacobsen; Jake Johnson; Braeden Jones; Tomuhini Topui; Jaimeon Winfield	Floyd Boucard; Jahkeem Stewart	Jide Abasiri; Jamaal Jarrett	Alex VanSumeren	Alifeleti Tuihalamaka; Isaia Vandermade	-
DE 7 (1)	Simote Katoanga; Jadyn Ramos; Luke Wafle; Andrew Williams	-	Kameryn Crawford	Zuriah Fisher; Braylan Shelby	Mekai Brown	-
LB 9 (2)	Talanoa Ili; Taylor Johnson; Shaun Scott	Elijah Newby; Jadyn Walker	Deven Bryant; Ta’Mere Robinson; Desman Stephens II	Roman Marchetti	Josiah Poyer; Dylan Wafle	-
CB 12 (2)	Trestin Castro; Jayden Crowder; Peyton Dyer; Alex Graham; Elbert Hill IV; Brandon Lockhart; RJ Sermons	Chasen Johnson; Carrington Pierce; Marcelles Williams	-	Prophet Brown; Jontez Williams	Danny Lang; Aaryn Washington	-
S 7 (1)	Joshua Holland II; Madden Riordan	Marquis Gallegos; Kendarius Reddick; Isaiah Rubin	Kennedy Urlacher	Christian Pierce	Gavin Williams	-
SP 4 (0)	Lachlan Carrigan	Caden Chittenden; Ryon Sayeri	-	Dylan Black	-	-
ATH (1)	-	-	-	-	Honor Fa’alave-Johnson	-

- Scholarship Distribution 2026 chart

^ : the players who still have to make an official choice and the players who are eligible for the Covid year.

redshirt year used / redshirt year eligible / * Former Walk-on / LDS Mission

– - players on scholarships / 105 scholarships permitted

=== Coaching staff additions & promotions ===
Name	Position	Old team	Old position
Gary Patterson	Defensive coordinator	Baylor	Consultant (2024)
Ray Thomas	Assistant strength and conditioning coach/director of speed development	Kansas State	Associate director of strength & conditioning
Skyler Jones	Defensive tackles	USC	Defensive analyst (DL)
AJ Howard	Outside linebackers	USC	Defensive assistant (LB) / assistant linebackers coach
Chad Savage	Tight ends / inside wide receivers / offensive passing game coordinator	USC	Tight ends / inside wide receivers
Mike Ekeler	Special teams coordinator / linebackers	Nebraska	Special teams coordinator
Paul Gonzales	Safeties / defensive pass game coordinator	Baylor	Pass-game coordinator / cornerbacks
Chris Meyers	Assistant offensive line & tight ends coach / run game specialist	South Dakota State	Tight ends coach / recruiting coordinator
Sam Carter	Assistant secondary coach / Nickels	Louisiana Tech	Safeties coach
Connor Killian	Director of football strategy	Baylor	Director of football strategy
Lee Morris	Offensive analyst (WR)	Memphis Showboats (UFL)	Offensive quality control coach
Dakota Prukop	Defensive analyst / defensive game strategy specialist	Calgary Stampeders (CFL)	Quarterbacks coach
Asante Das	Offensive analyst	USC	Wide receiver (player)

=== Coaching staff departures ===
Name	Position	New Team	New Position
D'Anton Lynn	Defensive coordinator	Penn State	Defensive coordinator
Eric Henderson	Co-Defensive coordinator/run game coordinator/defensive line	Washington Commanders (NFL)	Defensive run game coordinator/defensive line
Adrian Klemm	Senior defensive analyst	Alabama	Offensive line
Grayson Reed	Offensive analyst (OL)	North Carolina Central	Offensive line
Joe D'Orazio	Offensive assistant (RB)/director of football strategy	Utah	General manager
Doug Belk	Secondary coach	Denver Broncos (NFL)	Defensive backs coach
Brad Aoki	Offensive analyst (QB)	Alabama	Pass game specialist

=== Transfers ===
==== Transfers out ====
Name	Pos.	Height	Weight	Year	Hometown	New school
Husan Longstreet	QB	6’0	200	Freshman	Corona, CA	LSU
Gage Roy	QB	6’2	200	(redshirt) Junior	Dallas, TX	Illinois State
Bryan Jackson	RB	6’0	235	Sophomore	Reno, NV	Wisconsin
Harry Dalton III	RB	5’10	205	Freshman	Dinwiddie, VA	Maryland
Prince Strachan	WR	6’5	215	Junior	Freeport, BHS	West Virginia
Xavier Jordan	WR	5’11	175	(redshirt) Freshman	Los Angeles, CA	Arizona
Collin Fasse	WR	5’10	185	(redshirt) Freshman	Santa Maria, CA	Northern Colorado
Walker Lyons	TE	6’4	245	Sophomore	Folsom, CA	BYU
Joey Olsen	TE	6’5	250	(redshirt) Freshman	Lake Oswego, OR	New Mexico
Alex Payne	OL	6’5	305	Freshman	Gainesville, GA	Virginia
Micah Bañuelos	OL	6’2	310	(redshirt) Sophomore	Auburn, WA	Purdue
Makai Saina	OL	6’4	310	(redshirt) Freshman	Arlington, TX	Purdue
Devan Thompkins	DT	6’5	290	(redshirt) Junior	Tracy, CA	Alabama State
Carlon Jones	DT	6’3	310	(redshirt) Freshman	Bay City, TX	Arkansas
Gus Cordova	DE	6’4	270	Freshman	Lake Travis, TX	Mississippi State
Anthony Beavers Jr.	LB	6’1	230	(redshirt) Senior	Baldwin Hills, CA	Wyoming
Garrison Madden	LB	6’2	235	(redshirt) Junior	Hampton, GA	Western Kentucky
Matai Tagoa’i	LB	6’4	205	Freshman	Las Vegas, NV	Arizona
AJ Tuitele	LB	6’2	215	Freshman	North Las Vegas, NV	California
Braylon Conley	CB	6’0	190	(redshirt) Freshman	Humble, TX	Georgia
Kevin Longstreet	CB	5’9	190	(redshirt) Sophomore	Corona, CA	New Mexico
James Johnson	CB	5’9	195	Freshman	Douglasville, GA	Middle Tennessee
Steve Miller	S	6’1	185	Freshman	Greensboro, GA	UConn

==== Transfers in ====
Name	Pos.	Height	Weight	Year	Hometown	Old school	Notes
Terrell Anderson	WR	6’2	204	Sophomore	Greensboro, NC	NC State	
Tucker Ashcraft	TE	6’5	260	Junior	Seattle, WA	Wisconsin	
Alex VanSumeren	DT	6’3	295	(redshirt) Junior	Bay City, MI	Michigan State	
Zuriah Fisher	DE	6’3	258	(redshirt) Senior	Aliquippa, PA	Penn State	
Deven Bryant	LB	5’11	230	Sophomore	Carson, CA	Washington	
Jontez Williams	CB	5’11	200	(redshirt) Junior	Starke, FL	Iowa State	
Carrington Pierce	CB	6’1	175	Sophomore	Fontana, CA	Oklahoma State	
Lachlan Carrigan	P	6’3	190	Freshman	Melbourne, AUS	Memphis	
Dylan Black	LS	6’1	222	(redshirt) Senior	Reno, NV	Oregon State	
Caleb Moser	LS	5’10	250	Junior	Winston-Salem, NC	UAB	
Luke Degner	WR	6’0	195	Senior	Newport Beach, CA	Chicago	PWO
Marcus Sung	WR	5’11	225	Sophomore	Irvine, CA	Grinnell	PWO
Patrick O’Brien	TE	6’5	240	Freshman	San Diego, CA	USC Basketball	PWO
Ryan Pauley	OL	6’2	315	(redshirt) Junior	Carmel, IN	Valparaiso	PWO
Jordan Abarca	DT	6’4	260	Freshman	Seal Beach, CA	UCLA	PWO
Ethan Brougham	DE	6’2	238	(redshirt) Sophomore	Dana Point, CA	Rice	PWO
Ryan O’Connell	LB	6’2	225	Senior	Fairfield, CT	Penn	PWO
GianCarlo Rufo	LB	6’2	232	Junior	Honolulu, HI	Georgetown	PWO
Nate Hillenburg	P	6’3	230	(redshirt) Junior	Indianapolis, IN	Valparaiso	PWO
Zachary Nandlal	P	5’8	175	Sophomore	Sydney, Australia	Saint Ignatius' College Riverview	PWO
Jaden Lyons	WR	6’0	185	Senior	Freeport, NY	Virginia	PWO
Luca Torti	LB	6’1	203	Senior	Carlsbad, CA	Wheaton	PWO

=== NFL draft ===
==== Entered NFL draft ====
The following players so far have declared for the 2026 NFL Draft: WRs Makai Lemon and Ja'Kobi Lane, TE Lake McRee, C J’Onre Reed, DT Keeshawn Silver, DE Anthony Lucas, LB Eric Gentry, CBs D.J. Harvey and DeCarlos Nicholson, Safeties Kamari Ramsey and Bishop Fitzgerald.

Player	Position	Round	Pick	Drafted by
Makai Lemon	WR	1	20	Philadelphia Eagles
Ja'Kobi Lane	WR	3	80	Baltimore Ravens
Kamari Ramsey	S	5	141	Houston Texans
Bishop Fitzgerald	S	UDFA		Tennessee Titans
Lake McRee	TE	UDFA		Pittsburgh Steelers
Keeshawn Silver	DT	UDFA		New Orleans Saints
DeCarlos Nicholson	CB	UDFA		Cleveland Browns
Eric Gentry	LB	UDFA		Cincinnati Bengals
Anthony Lucas	DE	UDFA		Detroit Lions
DJ Wingfield	OG	UDFA		Dallas Cowboys
D.J. Harvey	CB	Rookie Minicamp		Atlanta Falcons
Jaden Richardson	WR	Rookie Minicamp		Kansas City Chiefs
Sam Johnson	P	Rookie Minicamp		Las Vegas Raiders
Eli Sanders	RB			
Jay Fair	WR			
J’Onre Reed	C			
Hank Pepper	LS			

==== NFL Draft Combine ====
Participants
Name	POS	HT	WT	Arms	Hands	40	Bench press	Vert jump	20-yd shuttle	3-cone drill	Broad jump
Makai Lemon	WR	5’11”	192	30 1/2”	8 3/4”	DNP	DNP	DNP	DNP	DNP	DNP
Ja'Kobi Lane	WR	6’4”	200	32 5/8”	10 1/2”	4.47	DNP	40.00”	DNP	DNP	10’9”
Lake McRee	TE	6’4”	243	31 1/2”	9 1/4”	DNP	22	DNP	DNP	DNP	DNP
Anthony Lucas	DE	6’5 1/2”	256	33 1/2”	10 1/4”	DNP	DNP	DNP	DNP	DNP	DNP
Eric Gentry	LB	6’7”	221	35”	10 1/2”	DNP	DNP	DNP	DNP	DNP	DNP
Kamari Ramsey	S	6’0”	202	30 5/8”	9 1/4”	4.47	16	36.00”	DNP	DNP	10’0”
Bishop Fitzgerald	S	5’11”	201	31 1/4”	9 1/2”	4.55	12	33.00”	DNP	DNP	DNP

† Top performer DNP = Did not participate

==== USC Pro Day ====
2026 USC Pro Day
Name	POS	HT	WT	Arms	Hands	40	Bench press	Vert jump	20-yd shuttle	3-cone drill	Broad jump
Eli Sanders	RB	5’10 3/4”	199	31 3/8”	8 1/2”	DNP	16	DNP	DNP	DNP	DNP
Jay Fair	WR	5’10”	186	29 5/8”	8 5/8”	4.43	9	33 1/2”	4.32	7.03	9’10”
Makai Lemon	WR	5’11”	194	30 5/8”	9”	4.46	DNP	DNP	DNP	DNP	DNP
Ja'Kobi Lane	WR	6’4 1/8”	208	33 1/8”	10 3/8”	DNP	11	DNP	DNP	DNP	DNP
Jaden Richardson	WR	6’1 3/8”	209	31 3/4”	9 1/2”	4.52	16	35”	4.15	6.76	10’6”
Lake McRee	TE	6’3 3/4”	248	32 1/4”	9 3/8”	4.73	DNP	31 1/2”	4.41	7.15	9’3”
DJ Wingfield	OG	6’3 5/8”	311	33 5/8”	9 5/8”	5.01	21	23”	4.65	7.78	8’4”
J’Onre Reed	C	6’3”	311	34 1/4”	9 1/2”	5.27	17	23”	5.04	8.20	8’1”
Keeshawn Silver	DT	6’4 1/8”	319	35”	10”	DNP	DNP	DNP	DNP	DNP	DNP
Anthony Lucas	DE	6’5 3/8”	260	34 3/8”	10 1/4”	DNP	DNP	DNP	DNP	DNP	DNP
Eric Gentry	LB	6’6 5/8”	228	35 3/4”	10 1/2”	4.54	13	35 1/2”	4.32	6.76	10’4”
D.J. Harvey	CB	5’10”	189	28 7/8”	8 1/2”	4.46	13	35 1/2”	4.28	7.03	10’3”
DeCarlos Nicholson	CB	6’3 1/4”	200	33 1/2”	9 1/4”	4.50	11	34 1/2”	4.25	6.54	11”
Kamari Ramsey	S	6’0”	203	31”	9 1/8”	DNP	DNP	DNP	DNP	DNP	DNP
Bishop Fitzgerald	S	5’11”	201	31 1/4”	9 5/8”	DNP	DNP	34”	4.20	6.89	DNP
Sam Johnson	P	6’2 1/2”	222	30 1/2”	8 7/8”	DNP	DNP	DNP	DNP	DNP	DNP
Hank Pepper	LS	6’0 7/8”	216	31”	9”	4.74	DNP	35”	4.53	7.25	9’9”
Mason Cobb	LB (2024)	5’11 3/4”	240	30”	9 1/8”	4.79	25	DNP	DNP	DNP	DNP

† Top performer DNP = Did not participate

=== Returning starters ===
Offense

Player	Position	Games started
Jayden Maiava	Quarterback	13 games
King Miller	Running Back	7 games
Waymond Jordan	Running Back	6 games
Tanook Hines	Wide Receiver	8 games
Zacharyus Williams	Wide Receiver	2 games
Carson Tabaracci	Tight End	1 game
Tobias Raymond	Offensive Line	13 games
Justin Tauanuu	Offensive Line	13 games
Alani Noa	Offensive Line	10 games
Elijah Paige	Offensive Line	7 games
Kilian O'Connor	Offensive Line	7 games
Kaylon Miller	Offensive Line	3 games
Hayden Treter	Offensive Line	1 game

Defense

Player	Position	Games started
Jide Abasiri	Defensive Tackle	9 games
Kameryn Crawford	Defensive End	8 games
Braylan Shelby	Defensive End	6 games
Desman Stephens II	Linebacker	13 games
Jadyn Walker	Linebacker	5 games
Marcelles Williams	Cornerback	11 games
Alex Graham	Cornerback	2 games
Christian Pierce	Safety	9 games
Kennedy Urlacher	Safety	3 games

Special teams

Player	Position	Games started
Ryon Sayeri	Kicker	13 games

=== Recruiting class ===
College recruiting (2026)
Name	Hometown	School	Height	Weight	Commit date
Luke Wafle #1 EDGE #5 nat.	Middletown, NJ	The Hun School	6 ft 5.5 in (1.97 m)	255 lb (116 kg)	June 19, 2025 (Committed) / December 3, 2025 (Signed)
Luke Wafle #1 EDGE #5 nat.	Recruit ratings: Rivals: 247Sports: ESPN:				
Mark Bowman #4 TE #31 nat.	Santa Ana, Ca	Mater Dei HS	6 ft 4 in (1.93 m)	230 lb (100 kg)	May 30, 2025 (Committed) / December 3, 2025 (Signed)
Mark Bowman #4 TE #31 nat.	Recruit ratings: Rivals: 247Sports: ESPN:				
Keenyi Pepe #6 OT #37 nat.	Long Beach, CA	IMG Academy (FL)	6 ft 7 in (2.01 m)	325 lb (147 kg)	May 1st, 2025 (Committed) / December 3, 2025 (Signed)
Keenyi Pepe #6 OT #37 nat.	Recruit ratings: Rivals: 247Sports: ESPN:				
Jaimeon Winfield #3 DL #39 nat.	Richardson, TX	Richardson HS	6 ft 3 in (1.91 m)	325 lb (147 kg)	March 14, 2025 (Committed) / December 3, 2025 (Signed)
Jaimeon Winfield #3 DL #39 nat.	Recruit ratings: Rivals: 247Sports: ESPN:				
Boobie Feaster #4 WR #40 nat.	DeSoto, TX	DeSoto HS	6 ft 0.5 in (1.84 m)	175 lb (79 kg)	July 4, 2025 (Committed) / December 3, 2025 (Signed)
Boobie Feaster #4 WR #40 nat.	Recruit ratings: Rivals: 247Sports: ESPN:				
Elbert Hill IV #5 CB #48 nat.	Akron, OH	Archbishop Hoban HS	5 ft 11 in (1.80 m)	180 lb (82 kg)	May 2, 2025 (Committed) / December 3, 2025 (Signed)
Elbert Hill IV #5 CB #48 nat.	Recruit ratings: Rivals: 247Sports: ESPN:				
Kayden Dixon-Wyatt #8 WR #55 nat.	Inglewood, CA	Mater Dei HS	6 ft 2 in (1.88 m)	195 lb (88 kg)	December 3, 2025 (Committed) / December 3, 2025 (Signed)
Kayden Dixon-Wyatt #8 WR #55 nat.	Recruit ratings: Rivals: 247Sports: ESPN:				
Vlad Dyakonov #9 OT #85 nat.	Folsom, CA	Folsom HS	6 ft 6 in (1.98 m)	275 lb (125 kg)	April 9, 2025 (Committed) / December 3, 2025 (Signed)
Vlad Dyakonov #9 OT #85 nat.	Recruit ratings: Rivals: 247Sports: ESPN:				
Deshonne Redeaux #5 RB #88 nat.	Los Angeles, CA	Oaks Christian HS	5 ft 10 in (1.78 m)	195 lb (88 kg)	April 5, 2025 (Committed) / December 3, 2025 (Signed)
Deshonne Redeaux #5 RB #88 nat.	Recruit ratings: Rivals: 247Sports: ESPN:				
Talanoa Ili #6 LB #107 nat.	Kahuku, HI	Kahuku HS	6 ft 3 in (1.91 m)	210 lb (95 kg)	June 15, 2025 (Committed) / December 3, 2025 (Signed)
Talanoa Ili #6 LB #107 nat.	Recruit ratings: Rivals: 247Sports: ESPN:				
Jonas Williams #8 QB #117 nat.	Frankfort Heights, CA	Lincoln-Way East HS	6 ft 1.5 in (1.87 m)	200 lb (91 kg)	February 21, 2025 (Committed) / December 3, 2025 (Signed)
Jonas Williams #8 QB #117 nat.	Recruit ratings: Rivals: 247Sports: ESPN:				
Shahn Alston #8 RB #121 nat.	Painesville, OH	Harvey HS	5 ft 10 in (1.78 m)	205 lb (93 kg)	January 11, 2025 (Committed) / December 3, 2025 (Signed)
Shahn Alston #8 RB #121 nat.	Recruit ratings: Rivals: 247Sports: ESPN:				
Tomuhini Topui #14 DL #126 nat.	Santa Ana, CA	Mater Dei HS	6 ft 2 in (1.88 m)	337 lb (153 kg)	April 1st, 2025 (Committed) / December 3, 2025 (Signed)
Tomuhini Topui #14 DL #126 nat.	Recruit ratings: Rivals: 247Sports: ESPN:				
Simote Katoanga #24 EDGE #191 nat.	Rancho Santa Margarita, CA	Santa Margarita Catholic HS	6 ft 4.5 in (1.94 m)	255 lb (116 kg)	February 23, 2025 (Committed) / December 3, 2025 (Signed)
Simote Katoanga #24 EDGE #191 nat.	Recruit ratings: Rivals: 247Sports: ESPN:				
Brandon Lockhart #30 CB #218 nat.	Los Angeles, CA	Sierra Canyon HS	6 ft 1.5 in (1.87 m)	165 lb (75 kg)	October 29, 2023 (Committed) / December 3, 2025 (Signed)
Brandon Lockhart #30 CB #218 nat.	Recruit ratings: Rivals: 247Sports: ESPN:				
Trent Mosley #38 WR #224 nat.	Rancho Santa Margarita, CA	Santa Margarita Catholic HS	5 ft 10 in (1.78 m)	170 lb (77 kg)	March 11, 2025 (Committed) / December 3, 2025 (Signed)
Trent Mosley #38 WR #224 nat.	Recruit ratings: Rivals: 247Sports: ESPN:				
Esun Tafa #13 IOL #230 nat.	Draper, UT	Corner Canyon HS	6 ft 5 in (1.96 m)	335 lb (152 kg)	March 11, 2025 (Committed) / December 3, 2025 (Signed)
Esun Tafa #13 IOL #230 nat.	Recruit ratings: Rivals: 247Sports: ESPN:				
Josiah Jefferson #1 TE #7 JuCo	Chula Vista, CA	Southwestern College	6 ft 5 in (1.96 m)	230 lb (100 kg)	October 27, 2025 (Committed) / December 3, 2025 (Signed)
Josiah Jefferson #1 TE #7 JuCo	Recruit ratings: Rivals: 247Sports: ESPN:				
Peyton Dyer #24 S #248 nat.	Chattanooga, TN	Tyner Academy	6 ft 0 in (1.83 m)	190 lb (86 kg)	June 8, 2025 (Committed) / December 3, 2025 (Signed)
Peyton Dyer #24 S #248 nat.	Recruit ratings: Rivals: 247Sports: ESPN:				
Breck Kolojay #19 IOL #251 nat.	Littleton, CO	IMG Academy (FL)	6 ft 5 in (1.96 m)	320 lb (150 kg)	August 1st, 2025 (Committed) / December 3, 2025 (Signed)
Breck Kolojay #19 IOL #251 nat.	Recruit ratings: Rivals: 247Sports: ESPN:				
Luc Weaver #43 WR #265 nat.	Sherman Oaks, CA	Notre Dame HS	6 ft 3 in (1.91 m)	194 lb (88 kg)	May 3, 2025 (Committed) / December 3, 2025 (Signed)
Luc Weaver #43 WR #265 nat.	Recruit ratings: Rivals: 247Sports: ESPN:				
Shaun Scott #42 EDGE #392 nat.	Santa Ana, CA	Mater Dei HS	6 ft 1.5 in (1.87 m)	235 lb (107 kg)	May 11, 2025 (Committed) / December 3, 2025 (Signed)
Shaun Scott #42 EDGE #392 nat.	Recruit ratings: Rivals: 247Sports: ESPN:				
Braeden Jones #43 DL #436 nat.	Chicago, IL	Mount Camel HS	6 ft 4 in (1.93 m)	250 lb (110 kg)	October 13, 2024 (Committed) / December 3, 2025 (Signed)
Braeden Jones #43 DL #436 nat.	Recruit ratings: Rivals: 247Sports: ESPN:				
Roderick Tezeno Jr. #88 WR #611 nat.	Opelousas, LA	Opelousas Catholic School	6 ft 2 in (1.88 m)	175 lb (79 kg)	April 30, 2025 (Committed) / December 3, 2025 (Signed)
Roderick Tezeno Jr. #88 WR #611 nat.	Recruit ratings: Rivals: 247Sports: ESPN:				
Ja’Myron Baker #95 WR #671 nat.	Los Alamitos, CA	Sierra Canyon HS	6 ft 0.5 in (1.84 m)	170 lb (77 kg)	September 2, 2023 (Committed) / December 3, 2025 (Signed)
Ja’Myron Baker #95 WR #671 nat.	Recruit ratings: Rivals: 247Sports: ESPN:				
Kannon Smith #67 IOL #709 nat.	Denver, CO	Valor Christian HS	6 ft 4 in (1.93 m)	290 lb (130 kg)	April 21, 2025 (Committed) / December 3, 2025 (Signed)
Kannon Smith #67 IOL #709 nat.	Recruit ratings: Rivals: 247Sports: ESPN:				
Andrew Williams #84 EDGE #754 nat.	Los Angeles, CA	John C. Fremont Senior HS	6 ft 5 in (1.96 m)	220 lb (100 kg)	February 12, 2025 (Committed) / December 3, 2025 (Signed)
Andrew Williams #84 EDGE #754 nat.	Recruit ratings: Rivals: 247Sports: ESPN:				
Joshua Holland II #84 CB #834 nat.	Bellflower, CA	St. John Bosco HS	6 ft 2 in (1.88 m)	170 lb (77 kg)	July 29, 2024 (Committed) / December 3, 2025 (Signed)
Joshua Holland II #84 CB #834 nat.	Recruit ratings: Rivals: 247Sports: ESPN:				
Madden Riordan #83 S #917 nat.	Pasadena, CA	Sierra Canyon HS	5 ft 10 in (1.78 m)	165 lb (75 kg)	November 5, 2023 (Committed) / December 3, 2025 (Signed)
Madden Riordan #83 S #917 nat.	Recruit ratings: Rivals: 247Sports: ESPN:				
Jake Johnson #102 DL #997 nat.	Prosper, TX	Prosper HS	6 ft 3 in (1.91 m)	290 lb (130 kg)	April 7, 2025 (Committed) / December 3, 2025 (Signed)
Jake Johnson #102 DL #997 nat.	Recruit ratings: Rivals: 247Sports: ESPN:				
Taylor Johnson #93 LB #1005 nat.	San Bernardino, CA	Cajon HS	6 ft 1 in (1.85 m)	200 lb (91 kg)	May 12, 2025 (Committed) / December 3, 2025 (Signed)
Taylor Johnson #93 LB #1005 nat.	Recruit ratings: Rivals: 247Sports: ESPN:				
Jayden Crowder #98 CB #1050 nat.	Corona, CA	Santa Margarita Catholic HS	5 ft 11 in (1.80 m)	165 lb (75 kg)	October 16, 2025 (Committed) / December 3, 2025 (Signed)
Jayden Crowder #98 CB #1050 nat.	Recruit ratings: Rivals: 247Sports: ESPN:				
John Fifita #109 IOL #1146 nat.	Mountain View, CA	St. Francis HS	6 ft 6 in (1.98 m)	350 lb (160 kg)	March 10, 2025 (Committed) / December 3, 2025 (Signed)
John Fifita #109 IOL #1146 nat.	Recruit ratings: Rivals: 247Sports: ESPN:				
Chase Deniz #83 OT #1150 nat.	San Diego, CA	Cathedral Catholic HS	6 ft 7 in (2.01 m)	295 lb (134 kg)	March 26, 2025 (Committed) / December 3, 2025 (Signed)
Chase Deniz #83 OT #1150 nat.	Recruit ratings: Rivals: 247Sports: ESPN:				
Malik Brooks #147 DL #1514 nat.	Downey, CA	St. Pius X-St. Matthias Academy	6 ft 2.5 in (1.89 m)	350 lb (160 kg)	March 29, 2025 (Committed) / December 3, 2025 (Signed)
Malik Brooks #147 DL #1514 nat.	Recruit ratings: Rivals: 247Sports: ESPN:				
Alex Medyn; QB PWO	Chino Hills, CA	Chino Hills HS	6 ft 0 in (1.83 m)	200 lb (91 kg)	12 April, 2026 (Committed)
Alex Medyn; QB PWO	Recruit ratings: 247Sports:				
Tyson Park; RB PWO	Austin, TX	IMG Academy (FL)	5 ft 9 in (1.75 m)	190 lb (86 kg)	October 17, 2025 (Committed) / December 3, 2025 (Signed)
Tyson Park; RB PWO	Recruit ratings: No ratings found				
Kayne Miller; RB PWO	Calabasas, CA	Calabasas HS	5 ft 8 in (1.73 m)	175 lb (79 kg)	December 4, 2025 (Committed) / December 4, 2025 (Signed)
Kayne Miller; RB PWO	Recruit ratings: No ratings found				
Griffin Brahm; WR PWO	Dana Point, CA	Santa Margarita Catholic HS	6 ft 1 in (1.85 m)	195 lb (88 kg)	May 1st, 2026 (Committed)
Griffin Brahm; WR PWO	Recruit ratings: No ratings found				
Grant Woods; WR PWO	Thousand Oaks, CA	Crespi HS	6 ft 7 in (2.01 m)	230 lb (100 kg)	March 19, 2026 (Committed)
Grant Woods; WR PWO	Recruit ratings: No ratings found				
Manoah Leiato; TE & LS PWO	Santa Ana, CA	Mater Dei HS	6 ft 3 in (1.91 m)	245 lb (111 kg)	January 20, 2026 (Committed) / February 5, 2026 (Signed)
Manoah Leiato; TE & LS PWO	Recruit ratings: No ratings found				
Ty Swanson; EDGE & TE PWO	Rancho Santa Margarita, CA	Santa Margarita Catholic HS	6 ft 4 in (1.93 m)	200 lb (91 kg)	September 17, 2025 (Committed) / December 3, 2025 (Signed)
Ty Swanson; EDGE & TE PWO	Recruit ratings: No ratings found				
Sam Smith; EDGE PWO	San Juan Capistrano, CA	JSerra Catholic HS	6 ft 4 in (1.93 m)	240 lb (110 kg)	October 29, 2025 (Committed) / December 3, 2025 (Signed)
Sam Smith; EDGE PWO	Recruit ratings: No ratings found				
Austin Engroff; LB PWO	Boise, ID	Timberline HS	6 ft 0 in (1.83 m)	185 lb (84 kg)	October 9, 2025 (Committed) / December 3, 2025 (Signed)
Austin Engroff; LB PWO	Recruit ratings: No ratings found				
Derek Diniz; CB PWO	Pebble Beach, CA	Stevenson HS	5 ft 11 in (1.80 m)	175 lb (79 kg)	March 6, 2026 (Committed)
Derek Diniz; CB PWO	Recruit ratings: No ratings found				
Peter Sciarrino; S PWO	Los Angeles, CA	Loyola HS	6 ft 0 in (1.83 m)	190 lb (86 kg)	August 6, 2025 (Committed) / December 3, 2025 (Signed)
Peter Sciarrino; S PWO	Recruit ratings: No ratings found				
Will Doherty; JuCo QB PWO	Manhattan Beach, CA	Santa Barbara CC	6 ft 4 in (1.93 m)	215 lb (98 kg)	
Will Doherty; JuCo QB PWO	Recruit ratings: No ratings found				
James Johnson; JuCo QB PWO	Huntington Beach, CA	Golden West College	5 ft 11 in (1.80 m)	190 lb (86 kg)	
James Johnson; JuCo QB PWO	Recruit ratings: No ratings found				
Overall recruit ranking: Rivals: #1 247Sports: #5 ESPN: #1
Note: In many cases, Scout, Rivals, 247Sports, On3, and ESPN may conflict in their listings of height and weight.; In these cases, the average was taken. ESPN grades are on a 100-point scale.; Sources: "2026 USC Football Commitments". Rivals.; "2026 Team Ranking". Rivals.com.; "USC 2026 Football Commitments". 247Sports.

== Statistics ==
=== Team ===
	USC	Opp
Scoring
Total	81	26
Points per game	40.5	13.0
First downs
Total	56	28
Rushing	20	8
Passing	35	16
Penalty	1	4
Rushing
Total yards	304	141
Avg per rush	3.9	2.7
Avg per game	152	70.5
Touchdowns	6	1
Passing
Total yards	753	311
Att-Comp-Int	67–59–1	47–28–1
Avg per pass	11.24	6.62
Avg per game	376.5	155.5
Touchdowns	5	2
Total offense
Total yards	1,057	452
Avg per play	7.3	4.5
Avg per game	528.5	226.0
Kicking
Punts-Yards	2–90	8–336
Avg per punt	45.0	42.0
Field goals-Attempts	0–0	1–1
Penalties
Total-Yards	10–78	4–25
Avg per game	39.0	12.5
Time of Possession
Total	01:16:07	00:43:53
Avg per game	38:04	21:56
Miscellaneous
3rd down conversions	14–21	7–21
3rd Down Pct.	66.67%	33.33%
4th down conversions	2–4	0–2
4th Down Pct.	50.00%	00.00%
Fumbles-Lost	3–2	1–1
Sacks-Yards	6–29	2–19
Red Zone Attempts-Score	10–13	3–5
Red Zone TD	10	2
Touchdowns scored	11	3
PAT-Attempts	11–11	1–1
Attendance
Total	104,158	0
Games-Avg per game	2–52,079	0
Neutral Site	/	

=== Scoring ===
==== USC vs. non-conference opponents ====
	1	2	3	4	Total
USC	14	44	9	14	81
Opponents	0	0	3	23	26

==== USC vs. B1G opponents ====
	1	2	3	4	Total
USC	0	0	0	0	0
B1G opponents	0	0	0	0	0

==== USC vs. all opponents ====
	1	2	3	4	Total
USC	14	44	9	14	81
Opponents	0	0	3	23	26

=== Individual leaders ===
==== Offense ====
Passing statistics
#	NAME	POS	RAT	CMP	ATT	YDS	AVG/G	CMP%	TD	INT	LONG

Rushing statistics
#	NAME	POS	ATT	GAIN	AVG	TD	LONG	AVG/G

Receiving statistics
#	NAME	POS	CTH	YDS	AVG	TD	LONG	AVG/G

==== Defense ====
Defense statistics

Key: POS: Position, SOLO: Solo Tackles, AST: Assisted Tackles, TOT: Total Tackles, TFL: Tackles-for-loss, SACK: Quarterback Sacks, INT: Interceptions, BU: Passes Broken Up, PD: Passes Defended, QBH: Quarterback Hits, FR: Fumbles Recovered, FF: Forced Fumbles, BLK: Kicks or Punts Blocked, SAF: Safeties, TD : Touchdown

==== Special teams ====
Kicking statistics

Kickoff statistics
#	NAME	POS	KICKS	YDS	AVG	TB	OB

Punting statistics
#	NAME	POS	PUNTS	YDS	AVG	LONG	TB	FC	I–20	50+	BLK

Kick return statistics
#	NAME	POS	RTNS	YDS	AVG	TD	LNG

Punt return statistics
#	NAME	POS	RTNS	YDS	AVG	TD	LONG
