= 2026 Louisiana Ragin' Cajuns football team =

American college football season

2026 Louisiana Ragin' Cajuns football
- Conference: Sun Belt Conference
- West Division
- Record: 8–3 (5–2 Sun Belt)
- Head coach: Michael Desormeaux (5th season)
- Associate head coach: Jorge Munoz (5th season)
- Offensive coordinator: Tim Leger (6th season)
- Defensive coordinator: Jim Salgado (3rd season)
- Home stadium: Our Lady Lourdes Stadium

2026 Sun Belt Conference football standings
	Conf.			Overall
Team	W		L	W		L
East Division
Georgia Southern	6	–	1	7	–	4
James Madison	5	–	2	8	–	3
Appalachian State	4	–	3	7	–	4
Coastal Carolina	3	–	4	4	–	7
Marshall	3	–	4	6	–	5
Georgia State	2	–	5	5	–	6
Old Dominion	2	–	5	3	–	8
West Division
Louisiana Tech xy	7	–	0	9	–	2
Louisiana	5	–	2	8	–	3
South Alabama	4	–	3	6	–	5
Arkansas State	2	–	5	4	–	7
Troy	2	–	5	4	–	7
Southern Miss	2	–	5	3	–	8
Louisiana–Monroe	2	–	5	2	–	9
Championship: TBD vs. Louisiana Tech
$ – Conference champion; x – Division champion/co-champions; y – Championship game participant; As of November 22, 2026; Rankings from AP poll

The 2026 Louisiana Ragin' Cajuns football team will represent the University of Louisiana at Lafayette in the Sun Belt Conference's West Division during the 2026 NCAA Division I FBS football season. The Ragin' Cajuns will be led by Michael Desormeaux in his fifth year as head coach. The Ragin' Cajuns play their home games at Our Lady Lourdes Stadium, located in Lafayette, Louisiana.

== Preseason ==
=== Media poll ===
In the Sun Belt preseason coaches' poll, the Ragin' Cajuns were picked to finish second place in the West division.

Wide receiver Shelton Sampson Jr. and defensive back Brent Gordon Jr. were awarded to be in the preseason All-Sun Belt first team offense and defense, respectively. Offensive lineman Kaden Moreau and defensive lineman Fitzgerald West Jr. were named to the second team offense and defense.

== Schedule ==
Date	Time	Opponent	Site	TV	Result	Attendance
September 5	7:00 p.m.	No. 14 (FCS) Lamar*	Cajun Field; Lafayette, LA (Sabine Shoe)	ESPN+	W 38–7	20,851
September 12	10:00 p.m.	at No. 14 USC*	Los Angeles Memorial Coliseum; Los Angeles, CA	BTN	L 30–49	60,019
September 19	7:00 p.m.	UAB*	Cajun Field; Lafayette, LA	ESPN+	W 21–14	18,216
September 26	5:30 p.m.	at Charlotte*	Jerry Richardson Stadium; Charlotte, NC	ESPN+	W 34–7	14,311
October 3	7:00 p.m.	Arkansas State	Cajun Field; Lafayette, LA	ESPN+	W 23–20	21,211
October 10	6:30 p.m.	at Louisiana Tech	Joe Aillet Stadium; Ruston, LA (rivalry)	ESPN+	L 31–32	20,035
October 17	4:00 p.m.	Troy	Cajun Field; Lafayette, LA	ESPN+	W 33–6	20,623
October 24	4:00 p.m.	at Southern Miss	M.M. Roberts Stadium; Hattiesburg, MS	ESPN+	L 31–35	23,244
November 7	4:00 p.m.	South Alabama	Cajun Field; Lafayette, LA	ESPN+	W 28–26	14,194
November 12	8:00 p.m.	at Louisiana–Monroe	Malone Stadium; Monroe, LA (Battle on the Bayou)	ESPN2	W 42–21	9,002
November 21	2:00 p.m.	Coastal Carolina	Cajun Field; Lafayette, LA	ESPN+	W 38–24	19,367
November 28	1:00 p.m.	at Georgia State	Center Parc Stadium; Atlanta, GA	ESPN+		
*Non-conference game; Rankings from AP Poll and CFP Rankings released prior to game; All times are in Central time

== Personnel ==
2026 Louisiana Ragin' Cajuns football team roster
Players
Coaches
Offense

Pos.	#	Name	Class
RB	0	Darrell Smith	Fr
WR	2	Rahji Dennis	So
QB	3	Coleman Carter	Fr
WR	4	Trenton Chaney	Fr
WR	6	Shelton Sampson Jr.	Jr
QB	7	Lunch Winfield	Jr
WR	8	Jaydon Johnson	Sr
WR	9	KeDarius Wade	Jr
WR	10	Russell Babineaux	Fr
QB	11	Daniel Beale	So
QB	13	Alex Munoz	Fr
WR	15	Ja'Corian Norris	So
QB	16	Sam Altmann	So
WR	17	Landon Strother	So
TE	18	Khristian Mackintrush	Fr
RB	20	J. J. Garner	Fr
RB	21	Ke'Rynn Smith	Fr
RB	22	Anthony Reagan Jr.	Jr
RB	24	Steven Blanco	So
RB	29	Owen Morris	Fr
TE	43	Aiden Falgout	Fr
TE	44	Teddy Gawlik	So
TE	46	Emiliano Soldevilla	Jr
OL	50	Cooper Fordham	Jr
OL	52	Ryder Bentley	So
OL	53	Gunnar Goodwin	Fr
OL	55	Baylynn Williams	Fr
OL	57	Zay Alexander	So
OL	58	Trey Shaw	Fr
OL	59	Andrew Martinez	Jr
OL	60	Jackson Hammond	So
OL	61	Jayce Mitchell	So
OL	65	Xzavier Brown	Jr
OL	66	Colin Harrington	Fr
OL	67	Jayden Michael	Fr
OL	69	Jai'Vale Mays-Hudson	Fr
OL	71	George Jackson	Sr
OL	72	J'Marion Gooch	Jr
OL	73	Jayden McAllister	Fr
OL	74	Drake Perry	Fr
OL	75	Kaden Moreau	Sr
OL	76	Matthew Broussard	Jr
OL	77	Jakoby Isom	So
OL	78	Michael Bowens Jr.	Fr
OL	79	David Baker	Fr
WR	80	Jayden Lewis	Fr
TE	82	Quandre Coates	Fr
TE	83	Brock Chappell	Sr
WR	85	Landon Baptiste	Jr
TE	86	Jerry Birdlow	Fr
WR	87	Kristion Brooks	Fr
TE	88	Caden Jensen	Jr

Defense

Pos.	#	Name	Class
DL	0	Priest Ashe	So
OLB	2	Ashley Williams	Jr
LB	3	Micah Johnson	Jr
OLB	4	Princeton Malbrue	Sr
LB	6	Conor McPherson	So
LB	7	Ethan Veal	So
S	8	Kody Jackson	Jr
DE	9	Lance Williams	Jr
CB	10	Avery Demery	So
CB	11	Brent Gordon Jr.	So
CB	13	Curley Reed III	Jr
OLB	15	Na'Tori Brown	So
LB	16	Kailep Edwards	Sr
DE	17	Tito Chikere	Sr
CB	18	Cam Riley	Fr
S	19	Luke Green	Fr
CB	20	Braylon Walker	Fr
S	21	Maurion Eleam	Sr
CB	22	Kevin Malone	Fr
CB	23	Jeremiah Moses	Jr
S	24	Lake Bates	So
DB	25	Jayden Glosten	Fr
S	26	Kerry Wilson	Jr
S	27	Edrick Williams	Fr
S	28	Steven Ranel II	Fr
CB	30	Julius Harper	Fr
DL	31	Ty Dominique	Fr
OLB	33	A. J. Spencer	Fr
S	34	Jayden Reed	Fr
S	35	Collin Jacob	Sr
LB	36	Devin Franklin	Fr
LB	37	Harrison Kidder	Fr
DE	41	Chase Edwards	Jr
LB	44	Jake St. Andre	Sr
LB	45	Patrick Gosslee	Fr
S	46	Roderick Bingham	Fr
CB	47	Maurice Brown Jr.	Fr
LB	51	Hayden Darbonne	Jr
DL	68	Fitzgerald West Jr.	Sr
OLB	80	Lester Jones	Jr
DL	91	Jordan Pinnock	Fr
DL	93	Brodrick Stewart	Jr
DL	95	Maxie Baudoin IV	Sr
DL	96	Chase Howard	Fr
DL	97	Xavier Waters	Fr
DL	98	Jeremiah Holts	So
DL	99	Ashton Wright	So

Special teams

Pos.	#	Name	Class
K	25	Brek Schultz	Fr
K	40	Logan Klotz	Sr
LS	48	Jackson Villaume	Fr
P	49	Mason Golding	Fr
LS	54	Carson Kraft	Fr
K	95	Tony Sterner	Sr

Head coach

- Michael Desormeaux

Coordinators/assistant coaches

- Jorge Munoz – Associate head coach/tight ends
- Tim Leger – Offensive coordinator/wide receivers
- Jim Salgado – Defensive coordinator
- Mike Giuliani – Special teams coordinator
- Steve Farmer – Offensive linemen/run game coordinator
- George Barlow – Cornerbacks
- P. J. Burkhalter – Assistant offensive linemen
- Marquase Lovings – Running backs
- Scott Stoker – Inside linebackers
- Dennis Thomas – Defensive linemen

Legend

- (C) Team captain
- (S) Suspended
- (I) Ineligible
- Injured
- Redshirt

Roster
Last update: 08/01/2026

== Game summaries ==
=== No. 14 (FCS) Lamar (Sabine Shoe) ===
No. 14 (FCS) Lamar Cardinals (1–0) at Louisiana Ragin' Cajuns (0–0) – Game summary

Quarter	1	2	3	4	Total
No. 14 (FCS) Cardinals	0	0	0	7	7
Ragin' Cajuns	7	21	7	3	38

at Our Lady of Lourdes Stadium • Lafayette, Louisiana

- Date: September 5
- Game time: 7:00 p.m. CDT
- Game weather: Cloudy • Temperature: 78 °F (26 °C) • Wind: W at 1 mile per hour (1.6 km/h)
- Game attendance: 20,851
- Referee: Jeremy Parker
- TV announcers (ESPN+): Dan McDonald (play–by–play), Eric Mouton (analyst), and Ben Schafer (sideline reporter)

Game information

First quarter

- (7:15) LA – Darrell Smith 2-yard run, Tony Sterner kick (Drive: 10 plays, 74 yards, 4:41; Louisiana 7–0)

Second quarter

- (13:23) LA – Darrell Smith 25-yard run, Tony Sterner kick (Drive: 4 plays, 46 yards, 1:20; Louisiana 14–0)
- (9:09) LA – Anthony Reagan Jr. 11-yard run, Tony Sterner kick (Drive: 4 plays, 39 yards, 1:52; Louisiana 21–0)
- (0:31) LA – Lunch Winfield 22-yard run, Tony Sterner kick (Drive: 8 plays, 80 yards, 1:20; Louisiana 28–0)

Third quarter

- (0:00) LA – Steven Blanco 1-yard run, Tony Sterner kick (Drive: 9 plays, 60 yards, 5:45; Louisiana 35–0)

Fourth quarter

- (11:48) LAM – Lanar Kelley 40-yard interception return, Andres Sandoval kick (Louisiana 35–7)
- (2:58) LA – Tony Sterner 31-yard field goal (Drive: 14 plays, 67 yards, 8:50; Louisiana 38–7)

Statistics	LAM	LA
First downs	16	25
Plays–yards	60–205	69–474
Rushes–yards	29–56	41–243
Passing yards	149	231
Passing: comp–att–int	18–31–3	20–28–3
Turnovers	4	3
Time of possession	26:22	33:38

Team	Category	Player	Statistics
Lamar	Passing	Aiden McCown	15/26, 126 yards, 3 INT
Lamar	Rushing	Jojo Uga	8 carries, 24 yards
Lamar	Receiving	Kyndon Fuselier	3 receptions, 35 yards
Louisiana	Passing	Lunch Winfield	15/21, 189 yards, 2 INT
Louisiana	Rushing	Darrell Smith	10 carries, 84 yards, 2 TD
Louisiana	Receiving	Caden Jensen	5 receptions, 77 yards

=== at No. 14 USC ===
Louisiana Ragin' Cajuns (1–0) at No. 14 USC Trojans (2–0) – Game summary

Quarter	1	2	3	4	Total
Ragin' Cajuns	3	7	7	13	30
No. 14 Trojans	7	21	7	14	49

at Los Angeles Memorial Coliseum • Los Angeles, California

- Date: September 12
- Game time: 10:00 p.m. CDT
- Game weather: Sunny • Temperature: 78 °F (26 °C) • Wind: SW at 7 miles per hour (11 km/h)
- Game attendance: 60,019
- Referee: Mark Kluczynski
- TV announcers (BTN): Mark Followill (Play-by-Play), Rhett Lewis (Color), and Caroline Hendershot (Sideline)

Game information

First quarter

- (11:23) LA – Tony Sterner 47-yard field goal (Drive: 4 plays, 9 yards, 2:01; Louisiana 3-0)
- (4:57) USC – Mark Bowman 9-yard pass from Jayden Maiava (Caden Chittenden kick), (Drive: 13 plays, 79 yards, 6:21; USC 7-3)

Second quarter

- (12:31) USC – Mark Bowman 9 yard pass from Jayden Maiava (Caden Chittenden kick), (Drive: 10 plays, 77 yards, 5:28; USC 14-3)
- (9:21) LA – Steven Blanco 1-yard run (Tony Sterner kick), (Drive: 7 plays, 75 yards, 3:10; USC 14-10)
- (3:19) USC – Kayden Dixon-Wyatt 19-yard pass from Jayden Maiava (Caden Chittenden kick), (Drive: 12 plays, 87 yards, 6:02; USC 21-10)
- (1:24) USC – Trent Mosley 86-yard punt return (Caden Chittenden kick), (USC 28-10)

Third quarter

- (9:48) USC – Trent Mosley 21-yard pass from Jayden Maiava (Caden Chittenden kick), (Drive: 7 plays, 41 yards, 3:10; USC 35-10)
- (4:07) LA – Lunch Winfield 1-yard run (Tony Sterner kick), (Drive: 12 plays, 81 yards, 5:37; USC 35-17)

Fourth quarter

- (14:19) USC – Zacharyus Williams 44-yard pass from Jayden Maiava (Caden Chittenden kick), (Drive: 3 plays, 40 yards, 1:14; USC 42-17)
- (11:27) LA – Lunch Winfield 32-yard run (Two-Point Conversion pass to Lunch Winfield is no good), (Drive: 5 plays, 75 yards, 2:52; USC 42-23)
- (7:30) USC – King Miller 12-yard run (Caden Chittenden kick), (Drive: 7 plays, 75 yards, 3:57; USC 49-23)
- (2:38) LA – Russell Babineaux 14-yard pass from Lunch Winfield (Tony Sterner kick), (Drive: 8 plays, 75 yards, 4:52; USC 49-30)

Statistics	LA	USC
First downs	17	25
Plays–yards	52–358	71–483
Rushes–yards	30–146	40–214
Passing yards	212	269
Passing: comp–att–int	16–22–0	20–31–1
Turnovers	0	1
Time of possession	26:46	33:14

Team	Category	Player	Statistics
Louisiana	Passing	Lunch Winfield	16/22, 212 yards, TD
Louisiana	Rushing	Lunch Winfield	14 carries, 91 yards, 2 TD
Louisiana	Receiving	Russell Babineaux	6 receptions, 91 yards, TD
USC	Passing	Jayden Maiava	19/29, 261 yards, 5 TD, INT
USC	Rushing	King Miller	18 carries, 128 yards, TD
USC	Receiving	Mark Bowman	6 receptions, 83 yards, 2 TD

=== UAB ===
UAB Blazers (1–1) at Louisiana Ragin' Cajuns (1–1) – Game summary

Quarter	1	2	3	4	Total
Blazers	0	7	0	7	14
Ragin' Cajuns	7	14	0	0	21

at Our Lady of Lourdes Stadium • Lafayette, Louisiana

- Date: September 19
- Game time: 7:00 p.m. CDT
- Game weather: Clear • Temperature: 90 °F (32 °C) • Wind: SE at 4 miles per hour (6.4 km/h)
- Game attendance: 18,216
- Referee: Edwin Lee
- TV announcers (ESPN+): Dan McDonald (play-by-play) and Eric Mouton (analyst)

Game information

First quarter

- (8:52) LA – Steven Blanco 1-yard run (Tony Sterner kick), (Drive: 13 plays, 80 yards, 6:01; Louisiana 7-0)

Second quarter

- (14:51) LA – Lunch Winfield 9-yard run (Tony Sterner kick), (Drive: 7 plays, 40 yards, 2:21; Louisiana 14-0
- (7:56) UAB – Chris Burge 13-yard fumble return (Jonah Delange kick), (Drive: 1 play, -21 yards, 0:14; Louisiana 14-7)
- (0:44) LA – Lunch Winfield 11-yard run (Tony Sterner kick), (Drive: 7 plays, 75 yards, 1:09; Louisiana 21-7)

Fourth quarter

- (8:59) UAB – Nate Rogers 11-yard run (Jonah Delange kick), (Drive: 2 plays, 13 yards, 0:39; Louisiana 21-14)

Statistics	UAB	LA
First downs	11	21
Plays–yards	58-218	72-335
Rushes–yards	31-74	53-225
Passing yards	144	110
Passing: comp–att–int	15-27-1	14-19-0
Time of possession	24:37	35:23

Team	Category	Player	Statistics
UAB	Passing	Ryder Burton	15/25, 144 yards, INT
UAB	Rushing	Rod Robinson II	13 carries, 52 yards
UAB	Receiving	Ty Mims	4 receptions, 57 yards
Louisiana	Passing	Lunch Winfield	15/20, 110 yards
Louisiana	Rushing	Lunch Winfield	19 carries, 91 yards, 2 TD
Louisiana	Receiving	Landon Strother	5 receptions, 41 yards

=== at Charlotte ===
Louisiana Ragin' Cajuns (2–1) at Charlotte 49ers (0–3) – Game summary

Quarter	1	2	3	4	Total
Ragin' Cajuns	0	0	0	0	0
49ers	0	0	0	0	0

at Jerry Richardson Stadium • Charlotte, North Carolina

- Date: September 26
- Game time: 5:30 p.m. CDT
- Game attendance: 14,311
- TV announcers (ESPN+): Tom Werme (play-by-play) and Reginald Walker Jr. (analyst)

Statistics	LA	CLT
First downs		
Plays–yards		
Rushes–yards		
Passing yards		
Passing: comp–att–int		
Time of possession		

Team	Category	Player	Statistics
Louisiana	Passing		
Louisiana	Rushing		
Louisiana	Receiving		
Charlotte	Passing		
Charlotte	Rushing		
Charlotte	Receiving		

=== Arknasas State ===
Arkansas State Red Wolves (2–2) at Louisiana Ragin' Cajuns (3–1) – Game summary

Quarter	1	2	3	4	Total
Red Wolves	0	0	0	0	0
Ragin' Cajuns	0	0	0	0	0

at Our Lady of Lourdes Stadium • Lafayette, Louisiana

- Date: October 3
- Game time: 7:00 p.m. CDT
- Game attendance: 21,211
- TV announcers (ESPN+): Dan McDonald (play-by-play) and Eric Mouton (analyst)

Statistics	ARST	LA
First downs		
Plays–yards		
Rushes–yards		
Passing yards		
Passing: comp–att–int		
Time of possession		

Team	Category	Player	Statistics
Arkansas State	Passing		
Arkansas State	Rushing		
Arkansas State	Receiving		
Louisiana	Passing		
Louisiana	Rushing		
Louisiana	Receiving		

=== at Louisiana Tech (rivalry) ===
Louisiana Ragin' Cajuns (4–1) at Louisiana Tech Bulldogs (2–2) – Game summary

Quarter	1	2	3	4	Total
Ragin' Cajuns	0	0	0	0	0
Bulldogs	0	0	0	0	0

at Joe Aillet Stadium • Ruston, Louisiana

- Date: October 10
- Game time: 6:30 p.m. CDT
- Game attendance: 20,035
- TV announcers (ESPN+): Malcolm Butler (play-by-play) and Luke McCown (analyst)

Statistics	LA	LT
First downs		
Total yards		
Rushing yards		
Passing yards		
Turnovers		
Time of possession		

Team	Category	Player	Statistics
Louisiana	Passing		
Louisiana	Rushing		
Louisiana	Receiving		
Louisiana Tech	Passing		
Louisiana Tech	Rushing		
Louisiana Tech	Receiving		

=== Troy ===
Troy Trojans (3–2) at Louisiana Ragin' Cajuns (4–2) – Game summary

Quarter	1	2	3	4	Total
Trojans	0	0	0	0	0
Ragin' Cajuns	0	0	0	0	0

at Our Lady of Lourdes Stadium • Lafayette, Louisiana

- Date: October 17
- Game time: 4:00 p.m. CDT
- Game attendance: 20,623
- TV: ESPN+

Game information

First quarter
Second quarter
Third quarter
Fourth quarter

Statistics	TROY	LA
First downs		
Plays–yards		
Rushes–yards		
Passing yards		
Passing: comp–att–int		
Time of possession		

Team	Category	Player	Statistics
Troy	Passing		
Troy	Rushing		
Troy	Receiving		
Louisiana	Passing		
Louisiana	Rushing		
Louisiana	Receiving		

=== at Southern Miss ===
Louisiana Ragin' Cajuns (5–2) at Southern Miss Golden Eagles (1–5) – Game summary

Quarter	1	2	3	4	Total
Ragin' Cajuns	0	0	0	0	0
Golden Eagles	0	0	0	0	0

at M.M. Roberts Stadium • Hattiesburg, Mississippi

- Date: October 24
- Game time: 4:00 p.m. CDT
- Game attendance: 23,244
- TV: ESPN+

Statistics	LA	USM
First downs		
Plays–yards		
Rushes–yards		
Passing yards		
Passing: comp–att–int		
Time of possession		

Team	Category	Player	Statistics
Louisiana	Passing		
Louisiana	Rushing		
Louisiana	Receiving		
Southern Miss	Passing		
Southern Miss	Rushing		
Southern Miss	Receiving		

=== South Alabama ===
South Alabama Jaguars (4–4) at Louisiana Ragin' Cajuns (5–3) – Game summary

Quarter	1	2	3	4	Total
Jaguars	7	10	6	3	26
Ragin' Cajuns	7	14	7	0	28

at Our Lady of Lourdes Stadium • Lafayette, Louisiana

- Date: November 7
- Game time: 4:00 p.m. CDT
- Game weather: Sunny • Temperature: 74 °F (23 °C) • Wind: N at 9 miles per hour (14 km/h)
- Game attendance: 14,194
- Referee: Brandon Kirkland
- TV announcers (ESPN+): Dan McDonald (play-by-play), Steve Peloquin (analyst) and Ben Schafer (sideline)

Game information

First quarter

- (14:48) LA – JJ Garner 100-yard kickoff return, Tony Sterner kick (Louisiana 7–0)
- (2:11) USA – Bishop Davenport 1-yard run, Dylan Freebury kick (Drive: 14 plays, 63 yards, 6:03; Tied 7–7)

Second quarter

- (14:51) USA – JJ Garner 65-yard run, Tony Sterner kick (Drive: 5 plays, 86 yards, 2:15; Louisiana 14–7)
- (9:28) USA – Jaylen Moson 72-yard interception, Dylan Freebury kick (Tied 14–14)
- (4:16) LA – Lunch Winfield 14-yard run, Tony Sterner kick (Drive: 8 plays, 78 yards, 5:04; Louisiana 21–14)
- (1:13) USA – Dylan Freebury 44-yard field goal (Drive: 9 plays, 44 yards, 2:57; Louisiana 21–17)

Third quarter

- (3:52) LA – Shelton Sampson Jr. 27-yard pass from Lunch Winfield, Tony Sterner kick (Drive: 6 plays, 81 yards, 2:36; Louisiana 28–17)
- (3:18) USA – Bishop Davenport 45-yard run (Drive: 2 plays, 89 yards, 0:29; Louisiana 28–23)

Fourth quarter

- (10:26) USA – Dylan Freebury 50-yard field goal (Drive: 9 plays, 41 yards, 4:29; Louisiana 28–26)

Statistics	USA	LA
First downs	17	19
Plays–yards	57–369	58–459
Rushes–yards	35–159	44–312
Passing yards	210	147
Passing: comp–att–int	16–22–1	10–14–1
Time of possession	28:23	31:37

Team	Category	Player	Statistics
South Alabama	Passing	Bishop Davenport	16/22, 210 yards, INT
South Alabama	Rushing	Bishop Davenport	11 carries, 57 yards, 2 TD
South Alabama	Receiving	Brendan Jenkins	6 receptions, 101 yards
Louisiana	Passing	Lunch Winfield	10/14, 147 yards, TD, INT
Louisiana	Rushing	JJ Garner	10 carries, 136 yards, TD
Louisiana	Receiving	Trenton Chaney	2 receptions, 46 yards

=== at Louisiana–Monroe (Battle on the Bayou) ===
Louisiana Ragin' Cajuns (6–3) at Louisiana–Monroe Warhawks (2–7) – Game summary

Quarter	1	2	3	4	Total
Ragin' Cajuns	0	0	0	0	0
Warhawks	0	0	0	0	0

at Malone Stadium • Monroe, Louisiana

- Date: November 12
- Game time: 8:00 p.m.
- Game attendance: 9,002
- TV: ESPN2

Statistics	LA	ULM
First downs		
Plays–yards		
Rushes–yards		
Passing yards		
Passing: comp–att–int		
Time of possession		

Team	Category	Player	Statistics
Louisiana	Passing		
Louisiana	Rushing		
Louisiana	Receiving		
Louisiana–Monroe	Passing		
Louisiana–Monroe	Rushing		
Louisiana–Monroe	Receiving		

=== Coastal Carolina ===
Coastal Carolina Chanticleers (4–6) at Louisiana Ragin' Cajuns (7–3) – Game summary

Quarter	1	2	3	4	Total
Chanticleers	0	0	0	0	0
Ragin' Cajuns	0	0	0	0	0

at Our Lady of Lourdes Stadium • Lafayette, Louisiana

- Date: November 21
- Game time: 2:00 p.m. CDT
- TV: ESPN+

Game information

First quarter

Second quarter

Third quarter

Fourth quarter

Statistics	CCU	LA
First downs		
Total yards		
Rushing yards		
Passing yards		
Passing: Comp–Att–Int		
Time of possession		

Team	Category	Player	Statistics
Coastal Carolina	Passing		
Coastal Carolina	Rushing		
Coastal Carolina	Receiving		
Louisiana	Passing		
Louisiana	Rushing		
Louisiana	Receiving		

=== at Georgia State ===
Louisiana Ragin' Cajuns (0–0) at Georgia State Panthers (0–0) – Game summary

Quarter	1	2	3	4	Total
Ragin' Cajuns	0	0	0	0	0
Panthers	0	0	0	0	0

at Center Parc Stadium • Atlanta, Georgia

- Date: November 28
- Game time: 1:00 p.m. CDT
- TV: ESPN+

Game information

First quarter
Second quarter
Third quarter
Fourth quarter

Statistics	LA	GAST
First downs		
Plays–yards		
Rushes–yards		
Passing yards		
Passing: comp–att–int		
Turnovers		
Time of possession		

Team	Category	Player	Statistics
Louisiana	Passing		
Louisiana	Rushing		
Louisiana	Receiving		
Georgia State	Passing		
Georgia State	Rushing		
Georgia State	Receiving		
