= Doug Belk =

American football coach (born 1987)

Denver Broncos
- Title: Defensive backs coach

Personal information
- Born: September 16, 1987 (age 39); Valdosta, Georgia, U.S.
- Listed height: 5 ft 11 in (1.80 m)
- Listed weight: 190 lb (86 kg)

Career information
- Position: Quarterback
- High school: Lowndes County (Valdosta, Georgia)
- College: Carson–Newman (2007–2010)

Career history
- Valdosta State (2011–2013); Defensive assistant & special teams coach (2011); Defensive backs coach (2012–2013); Alabama (2014–2016) Graduate assistant; West Virginia (2017–2018) Cornerbacks coach; Houston (2019–2023); Co-defensive coordinator & safeties coach (2019); Assistant head coach, co-defensive coordinator & safeties coach (2020); Assistant head coach, defensive coordinator & safeties coach (2021–2023); USC (2024–2025) Defensive backs coach; Denver Broncos (2026–present) Defensive backs coach

Awards and highlights
- As assistant coach: CFP national champion (2015); NCAA Division II national champion (2012)

Douglas Belk (born September 16, 1987) is an American professional football coach who is the defensive backs coach for the Denver Broncos of the National Football League (NFL). He has also coached in college for the West Virginia Mountaineers, Houston Cougars, and USC Trojans.

== Early life and college career ==
Belk was born in Valdosta, Georgia to Douglas and Dorothia Belk. He attended Lowndes County High School and played quarterback, running back, and wide receiver in college for the Carson–Newman Eagles.

Pre-draft measurables
Height	Weight	40-yard dash	10-yard split	20-yard split	20-yard shuttle	Three-cone drill	Vertical jump	Broad jump
5 ft 10 3/4 in (1.80 m)	190 lb (86 kg)	4.55 s	1.64 s	2.66 s	4.19 s	7.27 s	37.0 in (0.94 m)	10 ft 2 in (3.10 m)
All values from Pro Day

== Coaching career ==
=== Valdosta State ===
Belk began his coaching career in 2011 at Division II Valdosta State. In his first year he worked as a defensive assistant and assisted with the special teams. In 2012 and 2013 he coached the team's secondary, and they went on to win a division 2 national championship.

=== Alabama ===
In 2014 Belk took a pay cut in order to join Nick Saban’s Alabama staff as a graduate assistant. He stayed there until the end of the 2016 season, winning a national championship in 2015 and the SEC every year he was there.

=== West Virginia ===
In 2017 Belk was hired as the Mountaineers cornerbacks’ coach. He stayed there until the end of the 2018 season.

=== Houston ===
On January 11, 2019, it was announced that Belk followed Dana Holgorsen to Houston and became the team's safeties coach in addition to the team's co-defensive coordinator. In January 2020, he was given the additional title of associate head coach. On January 19, 2021 in addition to his positions as safeties coach and associate head coach, Belk was given control of the defense, becoming the sole defensive coordinator for Houston. He stayed there until Holgorsen was fired at the end of the 2023 season.

=== USC ===
From 2024 to 2025, Belk served as the defensive backs coach for the USC Trojans. During his tenure at USC, he was credited with developing prospects such as Jaylin Smith, Bishop Fitzgerald, and Kamari Ramsey.

=== Denver Broncos ===
On February 14, 2026, Belk was hired as the Denver Broncos' defensive backs coach, replacing recently fired cornerbacks coach Addison Lynch.
