= DJ Harvey (American football) =

American football player (born 2003)

No. 36 – Winnipeg Blue Bombers
- Position: Defensive back
- Roster status: Practice roster
- CFL status: American

Personal information
- Born: February 17, 2003 (age 23); Los Angeles, California, U. S.
- Listed height: 5 ft 11 in (1.80 m)
- Listed weight: 185 lb (84 kg)

Career information
- High school: Sierra Canyon School (Los Angeles)
- College: Virginia Tech (2021–2022); San Jose State (2023–2024); USC (2025)

Career history
- Winnipeg Blue Bombers (2026–present)

Awards and highlights
- Second team All-MWC (2024)
- Stats at CFL.ca

Damion "DJ" Harvey Jr. (born February 17, 2003) is an American professional football defensive back for the Winnipeg Blue Bombers of the Canadian Football League (CFL). He played college football for the Virginia Tech Hokies and the San Jose State Spartans and USC Trojans.

== Early life ==
Harvey grew up in Palmdale, California and attended Sierra Canyon School in Chatsworth. He was a four-star recruit and rated as one of the top cornerbacks in the nation in the class of 2021. During his high school career, Harvey played on both sides of the ball, amassing over 3,300 all-purpose yards, 94 tackles, and 12 interceptions. He committed to play college football at Virginia Tech over offers from LSU, Oregon and USC, among others.

== College career ==
=== Virginia Tech ===
Harvey began his college career at Virginia Tech in 2021. He appeared in 14 games over two seasons, primarily in a reserve role and on special teams. During his time with the Hokies, he recorded five tackles and returned one punt for 13 yards.

On November 28, 2022, Harvey announced that he would enter the NCAA transfer portal.

=== San Jose State ===
Following the 2022 season, Harvey transferred to San Jose State. In two seasons with the Spartans, he played in 23 games and became a key contributor on defense and special teams. In 2023, he recorded 58 solo tackles, four interceptions, six pass breakups, two sacks, and one touchdown on an interception return. His performance earned him Second Team All-Mountain West honors and Mountain West Defensive Player of the Week recognition during the season.

=== USC ===
On December 13, 2024, Harvey announced that he would transfer to USC.

== Professional career ==
Pre-draft measurables
Height	Weight	Arm length	Hand span	Wingspan	40-yard dash	10-yard split	20-yard split	20-yard shuttle	Three-cone drill	Vertical jump	Broad jump	Bench press
5 ft 10 in (1.78 m)	189 lb (86 kg)	28 7/8 in (0.73 m)	8 1/2 in (0.22 m)	5 ft 10 5/8 in (1.79 m)	4.55 s	1.62 s	2.70 s	4.38 s	7.13 s	35.5 in (0.90 m)	10 ft 3 in (3.12 m)	13 reps
All values from Pro Day

On September 26, 2026, Harvey signed with the Winnipeg Blue Bombers of the Canadian Football League (CFL) to the practice roster.

== Personal life ==
Harvey’s godbrother is Kamari Ramsey, a USC safety who also attended Sierra Canyon. Their relationship reportedly influenced Harvey’s decision to transfer to USC for his final collegiate season.
