= Mark Bowman =

American football player (born 2008)

No. 19 – USC Trojans
- Position: Tight end
- Class: Freshman

Personal information
- Born: January 11, 2008 (age 18)
- Listed height: 6 ft 4 in (1.93 m)
- Listed weight: 235 lb (107 kg)

Career information
- High school: Mater Dei (Santa Ana, California)
- College: USC (2026–present)
- Stats at ESPN

Mark Bowman (born January 11, 2008) is an American college football tight end for the USC Trojans.

== Early life ==
Bowman grew up in Castle Rock, Colorado before attending Mater Dei High School in Santa Ana, California. He had 11 receptions for 125 yards and four touchdowns during his freshman year. As a sophomore, Bowman caught 31 passes for 427 yards and eight touchdowns and was named All-Trinity League first team and All-CIF-SS Division 1 after helping the Monarchs to back-to-back CIF Southern Section Division 1 and State Open Division titles. He repeated that reception total as a junior with 370 yards and two touchdowns and was again named All-Trinity League first team. He reclassified to the 2026 recruiting class after his sophomore year.

Bowman was rated as one of the top tight end prospects in the 2026 recruiting class. Bowman committed to play college football at USC over offers from Georgia, Ole Miss, Oregon, and Texas.

== College career ==
Bowman made his collegiate debut in the 2026 season opener against San Jose State, starting at tight end. He recorded three receptions for 15 yards in a 42–26 victory. In Week 3 against Louisiana, he caught six passes for 83 yards and his first two collegiate touchdowns, both on passes from quarterback Jayden Maiava, in a 49–30 win. Following the performance, he was named Big Ten Freshman of the Week. Following a Week 5 loss to No. 20 Oregon, Bowman sustained a hamstring injury that sidelined him for the next three games. He returned in Week 9 against No. 2 Ohio State, making a reception before hurdling Buckeyes defender Jaylen McClain and breaking multiple tackles for a 70-yard gain that set up a touchdown run by King Miller. Bowman's highlight-reel play gained national attention as USC went on to win 30–18.

=== Statistics ===
Year	Team	Games		Receiving			
Year	Team	GP	GS	Rec	Yds	Avg	TD
2026	USC	7	7	30	330	11.0	2
Career		7	7	30	330	11.0	2
