= Kennedy Urlacher =

American football player (born 2005)

No. 9 – USC Trojans
- Position: Safety
- Class: Junior

Personal information
- Born: May 20, 2005 (age 21)
- Listed height: 5 ft 11 in (1.80 m)
- Listed weight: 200 lb (91 kg)

Career information
- High school: Chandler (Chandler, Arizona)
- College: Notre Dame (2024); USC (2025–present)
- Stats at ESPN

Kennedy Lee Urlacher (born May 20, 2005) is an American college football safety for the USC Trojans of the Big Ten Conference. He previously played for the Notre Dame Fighting Irish.

== Early life ==
Urlacher grew up in Queen Creek, Arizona and attended Casteel High School, before transferring to Chandler High School in Chandler, Arizona after his freshman year. He committed to play college football at the University of Notre Dame.

== College career ==
=== Notre Dame ===
As a freshman in 2024, Urlacher played in 14 games including the 2025 College Football Playoff National Championship. He finished the season with 12 total tackles (seven solo and five assisted), one tackle for loss, one pass breakup and one fumble recovery for three yards. On April 16, 2025, Urlacher announced that he would enter the transfer portal.

=== USC ===
On April 19, 2025, Urlacher announced that he would transfer to USC.

=== Statistics ===
Year	Team	GP	Tackles				Interceptions				Fumbles		
Year	Team	GP	Total	Solo	Ast	Sack	PD	Int	Yds	TD	FF	FR	TD
2024	Notre Dame	14	12	7	5	0.0	1	0	0	0	0	1	0
2025	USC	13	26	22	4	1.0	1	1	10	0	0	0	0
2026	USC	7	21	18	3	3.0	1	0	0	0	1	0	0
Career		34	59	47	12	4.0	3	1	10	0	1	1	0

== Personal life ==
Urlacher is the son of Tyna Robertson and Pro Football Hall of Famer Brian Urlacher. In June 2005, his father filed suit to establish paternity for him. Genetic testing confirmed that he was his son. Urlacher was then placed in joint custody of both parents. In 2017, Urlacher's father appealed to Cook County court to remove him from Robertson's custody after her husband, Ryan Karageorge, was shot and killed in their residence.
