= Jonas Williams =

American football player (born 2008)

No. 15 – USC Trojans
- Position: Quarterback

Personal information
- Born: June 4, 2008 (age 18)
- Listed height: 6 ft 2 in (1.88 m)
- Listed weight: 215 lb (98 kg)

Career information
- High school: Lincoln-Way East (Frankfort, Illinois)
- College: USC (2026–present)

Jonas Williams (born June 4, 2008) is an American college football quarterback for the USC Trojans.

== Early life ==
Williams first attended Bolingbrook High School in Illinois, where he won the starting quarterback job as a freshman in 2022 and threw for 2,737 yards and 37 touchdowns. He then threw for 3,196 yards and 33 touchdowns as a sophomore in 2023. He transferred to Lincoln-Way East High School as a junior in 2024 and led the team to a record of 12–1 while throwing for 2,926 yards and 42 touchdowns, being named all-conference, all-state, and the Illinois Player of the Year by the Champaign News-Gazette. Prior to his senior year, Williams participated at the Elite 11 competition. He threw for 2,488 yards and 35 touchdowns as a senior in 2025, setting state records for career passing yards (11,347) and touchdowns (147). He was named the Gatorade Illinois Player of the Year for his performance.

A four-star recruit, Williams was ranked a top-10 quarterback prospect nationally and a top-120 player overall in the class of 2026. He initially committed to play college football for the Oregon Ducks in August 2024. He later flipped his commitment to the USC Trojans in February 2025 and signed with the Trojans in December 2025.
