= Lunch Winfield =

American football player (born 2004)

No. 7 – Louisiana Ragin' Cajuns
- Position: Quarterback
- Class: (redshirt) Junior

Personal information
- Born: December 20, 2004 (age 21)
- Listed height: 6 ft 2 in (1.88 m)
- Listed weight: 225 lb (102 kg)

Career information
- High school: Lutcher (Lutcher, Louisiana)
- College: Louisiana (2023–present)
- Stats at ESPN

D'Wanye' "Lunch" Winfield (born December 20, 2004) is an American college football quarterback for the Louisiana Ragin' Cajuns.

== Early life ==
Winfield attended Lutcher High School in Lutcher, Louisiana. As a senior, he accounted for 4,657 total yards and 70 total touchdowns, leading Lutcher to a state championship. Winfield committed to play college football at the University of Louisiana at Lafayette, following his high school career.

== College career ==
Winfield played sparingly in his first two seasons, appearing in two games. After entering the 2025 season as the third string quarterback, he received his first significant playing time against Marshall, totaling 254 total yards and five touchdowns in a come-from-behind victory. For his performance, Winfield was named the Sun Belt Conference Offensive Player of the Week. He was also named the Ragin' Cajuns starting quarterback. In his first career start against James Madison, Winfield completed 14 of 28 pass attempts, for 243 yards, two touchdowns, and an interception in a loss. Against South Alabama, he set the school record for quarterback completion rate, completing 14 of 15 passes for 232 yards and two touchdowns in the 31–22 victory.

=== Statistics ===
**Bold**	Career high

Season	Team	Games			Passing								Rushing			
Season	Team	GP	GS	Record	Cmp	Att	Pct	Yds	Avg	TD	Int	Rtg	Att	Yds	Avg	TD
2023	Louisiana	1	0	0–0	–	–	–	–	–	–	–	–	5	19	3.8	0
2024	Louisiana	1	0	0–0	1	2	50.0	6	3.0	0	0	75.2	5	19	3.8	0
2025	Louisiana	**12**	**8**	**4–4**	**127**	**216**	58.8	**1,555**	7.2	**11**	**7**	129.6	**152**	**667**	4.4	**9**
2026	Louisiana	4	4	3–1	65	89	**73.0**	660	**7.4**	2	2	**138.2**	55	295	**5.4**	6
Career		18	12	7−5	193	307	62.9	2,221	7.2	13	9	131.7	217	1,000	4.6	15

== Personal life ==
Winfield goes by the nickname "Lunch", originating from a time that he ate his grandfather's (Dave Winfield) chicken wing when he was just a few months old.
