= Luke Wafle =

American football player

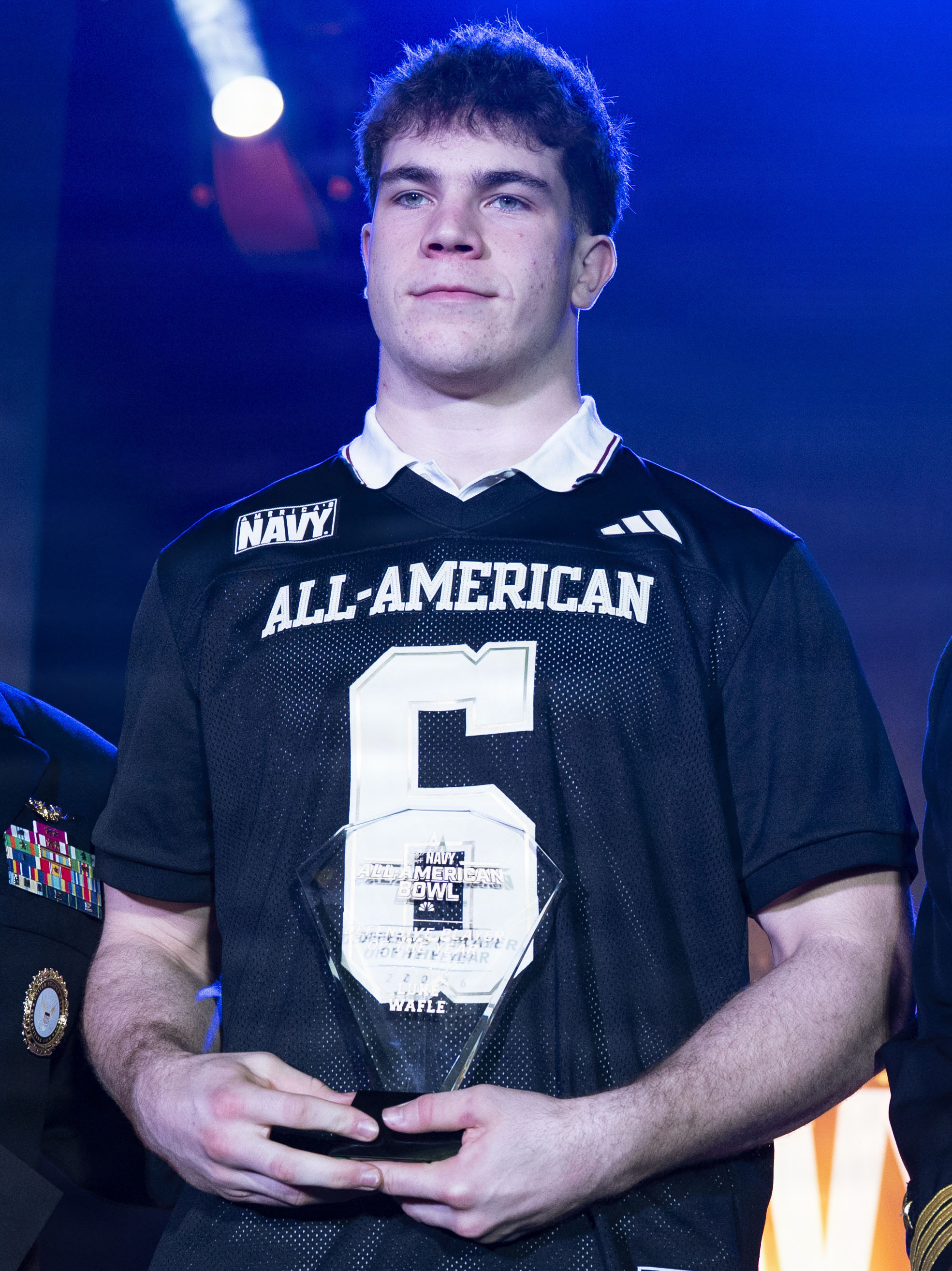
- Wafle at the All-American Bowl in 2026

No. 94 – USC Trojans
- Position: Defensive end
- Class: Freshman

Personal information
- Listed height: 6 ft 6 in (1.98 m)
- Listed weight: 265 lb (120 kg)

Career information
- High school: Hun School of Princeton (Princeton, New Jersey)
- College: USC (2026–present)

Luke Wafle is an American college football defensive end for the USC Trojans.

== Early life ==
Raised in Middletown Township, New Jersey, Wafle originally attended Middletown High School South, before transferring after his sophomore year to the Hun School of Princeton in Princeton, New Jersey, graduating in 2026. As a junior he had 53 tackles with eight sacks and as a senior had 99 tackles with a school record 23 sacks. He was named the 2025 All NJ Prep Football Team Defensive Player of the Year and the 2025 12th Man Touchdown Club Prep Lineman of Year his senior year.

Rivals.com rated Wafle as a five-star recruit and ranked him as the number 1 player in his class. He was selected to play in the 2026 Navy All-American Bowl, where he was named the MVP after recording two sacks and a fumble recovery. He committed to the University of Southern California to play college football.

== Personal life ==
His brother, Owen, plays college football at Duke.
