= Boobie Feaster =

American football player (born 2009)

No. 1 – USC Trojans
- Position: Wide receiver

Personal information
- Born: May 23, 2009 (age 17)
- Listed height: 6 ft 1 in (1.85 m)
- Listed weight: 185 lb (84 kg)

Career information
- High school: DeSoto (DeSoto, Texas)
- College: USC (2026–present)

Ethan "Boobie" Feaster (born May 23, 2009) is an American football wide receiver for the USC Trojans.

== Early life ==
Feaster's family is from Louisiana. He played football from a young age. At age four, while playing flag football, he acquired the nickname "Boobie" after Boobie Miles from Friday Night Lights. Prior to playing high school football, he already had 25 offers to play college football. He attended DeSoto High School where he became a starter at wide receiver as a freshman in 2023. Feaster was the first freshman wide receiver ever to win a starting role under coach Claude Mathis at DeSoto. That season, he helped DeSoto to the 6A Division II state championship, posting 634 receiving yards and nine touchdowns while being named a Freshman All-American and the 11-6A District Newcomer of the Year.

Prior to his sophomore year, Feaster already had 45 offers to play college football and was named a five-star recruit by Dave Campbell's Texas Football, becoming the youngest player ever to receive the distinction from the publication. He then totaled 57 catches for 824 yards and 13 touchdowns as a sophomore in 2024, earning first-team MaxPreps Sophomore All-America honors as well as first-team all-district honors. In 2025, he caught 98 passes for 1,777 yards and 21 touchdowns. He led the team to a State Championship and won Game MVP. He was selected to play at the Under Armour All-America Game and the Polynesian Bowl.

Feaster was initially ranked the top wide receiver recruit in the class of 2027. In February 2025, he announced his intention to reclassify to the class of 2026. A five-star prospect, the number three receiver and a top-30 recruit nationally according to ESPN, he committed to play college football for the USC Trojans. He signed with the Trojans in December 2025.
