= Jahkeem Stewart =

American football player (born 2007)

No. 4 – USC Trojans
- Position: Defensive lineman
- Class: Freshman

Personal information
- Born: May 6, 2007 (age 19); Reserve, Louisiana, U.S.
- Listed height: 6 ft 6 in (1.98 m)
- Listed weight: 290 lb (132 kg)

Career information
- High school: Edna Karr (New Orleans, Louisiana)
- College: USC (2025–present)

Jahkeem Stewart (born May 6, 2007) is an American college football defensive lineman for the USC Trojans. Stewart is rated as a five-star prospect and one of the top-ranked recruits for the class of 2025.

== Early life ==
Stewart was born in Reserve, Louisiana, where he grew up. He started playing football at age five. He was a standout in local youth leagues and continued playing while attending East St. John Preparatory Academy for middle school, being mainly used as a defensive lineman. He began working with trainer Clyde Alexander, a former Nicholls Colonels football player, in sixth grade. By that time, Stewart already stood at 6 feet 4 inches (193 cm) and 340 pounds (150 kg).

Stewart attended several national camps during summer 2021 and "dominated" there as well. By June 2021, at age 14, Stewart had already received athletic scholarship offers to play college football for major schools including Auburn, Ole Miss, Georgia, and Miami. He attended the eighth grade Under Armour All-America Game where he "tormented" top recruit Julian Lewis, according to ESPN.

== High school career ==
Although Stewart was initially going to play high school football for IMG Academy, he opted to transfer to St. Augustine High School in New Orleans as a freshman and thus had to sit out due to Louisiana High School Athletic Association (LHSAA) transfer rules. He meanwhile continued to impress at football camps and was ranked the consensus number one recruit for the class of 2026 by the time of his sophomore year. As a sophomore for St. Augustine in 2023, Stewart totaled 85 tackles, 33 tackles-for-loss (TFLs) and 20 sacks while appearing in 11 games. He received honors including first-team all-district 5A-9, first-team MaxPreps sophomore All-American and honorable mention 5A all-state from the Louisiana Sportswriters Association.

Stewart appeared in St. Augustine's season-opener in 2024. Afterwards, he opted to transfer to Edna Karr High School, in part due to St. Augustine opposing his request to re-classify to the class of 2025. However, due to LHSAA transfer rules, he became ineligible to play further in the 2024 season. The following month, he opted to re-classify, which thus ended his high school football career. He became the No. 11-overall player in ESPN's 2025 recruiting rankings and a five-star prospect. In December 2024, he announced his commitment to play college football for the USC Trojans.

== Personal life ==
Stewart lives with his trainer, Clyde Alexander, after his family's home was destroyed by Hurricane Ida in 2021.
