= Waymond Jordan =

American football player (born 2003)

No. 2 – USC Trojans
- Position: Running back
- Class: Senior

Personal information
- Born: November 4, 2003 (age 23)
- Listed height: 5 ft 10 in (1.78 m)
- Listed weight: 215 lb (98 kg)

Career information
- High school: Escambia (Pensacola, Florida)
- College: Hutchinson (2023–2024); USC (2025–present)
- Stats at ESPN

Waymond Jordan Jr. (born November 4, 2003) is an American college football running back for the USC Trojans.

== Early life ==
Jordan attended Escambia High School in Pensacola, Florida. During his high school career he rushed 569 yards for 4,235 yards with 42 touchdowns.

== College career ==
Jordan played two years at Hutchinson Community College. As a freshman in 2023, he played in seven games and rushed for 202 yards on 27 carries with touchdowns. As a sophomore in 2024 he was named the NJCAA DI Football Offensive Player of the Year after rushing for 1,614 yards on 218 carries with 20 touchdowns. After the season, Jordan transferred to the University of Southern California (USC). He entered his first year at USC in 2025 as the team's starting running back.
