= Kilian O'Connor =

American football player

No. 67 – USC Trojans
- Position: Offensive linesman
- Class: Redshirt Senior

Personal information
- Born: May 6, 2003 (age 23)
- Listed height: 6 ft 1 in (1.85 m)
- Listed weight: 295 lb (134 kg)

Career information
- High school: Santa Margarita (Rancho Santa Margarita, California)
- College: USC (2022–present)
- Stats at ESPN

Kilian O'Connor (born May 6, 2003) is an American football offensive linesman for the USC Trojans.

== Early life ==
O'Connor has played for the Trojans since 2022 and was a four star recruit, graduating from Santa Margarita Catholic High School.

== College ==
O'Connor redshirted as a true freshman during the 2022 season and did not appear in any games. In 2023, he appeared in seven games as a redshirt freshman, serving as a reserve center.

In 2024, O'Connor appeared in eight games, making one start in the 2024 Las Vegas Bowl against Texas A&M. During the 2025 offseason, he earned an athletic scholarship and appeared in eight games with seven starts, missing four games due to injury.

Entering the 2026 season, O'Connor was projected to be USC's starting center but suffered a noncontact leg injury during preseason practice and was ruled out for the season.
