= Kayden Dixon-Wyatt =

American football player (born 2007)

No. 17 – USC Trojans
- Position: Wide receiver
- Class: Freshman

Personal information
- Born: August 21, 2007 (age 19)
- Listed height: 6 ft 2 in (1.88 m)
- Listed weight: 200 lb (91 kg)

Career information
- High school: Mater Dei (Santa Ana, California)
- College: USC (2026–present)
- Stats at ESPN

Kayden Dixon-Wyatt (born August 21, 2007) is an American college football wide receiver for the USC Trojans.

== Early life ==
Dixon-Wyatt attended Mater Dei High School in Santa Ana, California. Over his freshman sophomore seasons, he combined for 37 receptions for 567 yards and five touchdowns. As a junior, he had 50 receptions for 693 yards with five touchdowns and as a senior had 42 receptions for 693 yards with eight touchdowns. Dixon-Wyatt was selected to play in the 2026 Navy All-American Bowl. He originally committed to play college football at Ohio State University before flipping his commitment to the University of Southern California (USC).

== College career ==
Dixon-Wyatt entered his true freshman year at USC in 2026 as a starter.
