= Trent Mosley =

American football player

No. 4 – USC Trojans
- Position: Wide receiver
- Class: Freshman

Personal information
- Born: July 26, 2006 (age 20)
- Listed height: 5 ft 10 in (1.78 m)
- Listed weight: 180 lb (82 kg)

Career information
- High school: Santa Margarita Catholic (Rancho Santa Margarita, California)
- College: USC (2026–present)
- Stats at ESPN

Trent Mosley (born July 26, 2006) is an American college football wide receiver for the USC Trojans.

== Early life ==
Mosley attended Santa Margarita Catholic High School in Rancho Santa Margarita, California. As a freshman, had 28 receptions for 409 yards with three touchdowns. As a sophomore he had 81 receptions for 1,282 yards with 11 touchdowns and also rushed for 270 yards and 15 touchdowns. For his junior year, Mosley had 61 receptions for 908 yards and eight touchdowns and added 102 yards and seven TDs rushing. As a senior, he was named the Los Angeles Times player of the year and Orange County Register athlete of the year. In the CIF Southern Section Division 1 championship game, Mosley had 10 receptions for 293 yards and two touchdowns while also scoring two rushing TDs in a 42-7 victory over Centennial High School. He finished the year with 58 receptions for 831 yards and six touchdowns while also rushing for 204 yards and scoring 10 TDs. Mosley was selected to play in the 2026 Navy All-American Bowl. He committed to the University of Southern California (USC) to play college football.

== College career ==
Mosley entered his true freshman year at USC in 2026 as a starter.

== Personal life ==
His brother, Emmett Mosley V, is also a wide receiver in college football. His father, Emmett Mosley, played college football at Notre Dame and his mother, Cindy Mosley, is a former soccer player.
