= Bishop Fitzgerald =

American football player (born 2003)

No. 37 – Tennessee Titans
- Position: Safety
- Roster status: Practice squad

Personal information
- Born: July 14, 2003 (age 23); Woodbridge, Virginia, U.S.
- Listed height: 5 ft 11 in (1.80 m)
- Listed weight: 201 lb (91 kg)

Career information
- High school: Gar-Field Senior (Woodbridge, Virginia)
- College: Coffeyville (2021–2022); NC State (2023–2024); USC (2025)
- NFL draft: 2026: undrafted

Career history
- Tennessee Titans (2026)*; Pittsburgh Steelers (2026)*; Detroit Lions (2026); Tennessee Titans (2026–present)*
- * Offseason or practice squad member only

Awards and highlights
- Consensus All-American (2025); First-team All-Big Ten (2025); KJCCC Defensive Player of the Year (2022)
- Stats at Pro Football Reference

Bishop Fitzgerald (born July 14, 2003) is an American professional football safety for the Tennessee Titans of the National Football League (NFL). He played college football for the Coffeyville Red Ravens, NC State Wolfpack, and USC Trojans. Fitzgerald was signed by the Tennessee Titans as an undrafted free agent following the 2026 NFL draft.

== Early life ==
Fitzgerald was born on July 14, 2004 in Woodbridge, Virginia. Fitzgerald attended Gar-Field Senior High School in Woodbridge, where he played quarterback.

== College career ==
Fitzgerald played at Coffeyville Community College in 2021 and 2022. As a sophomore in 2022, he was the Kansas Jayhawk Community College Conference (KJCCC) Defensive Player of the Year after recording 50 tackles and six interceptions. Fitzgerald transferred to NC State University for the 2023 season. In two years at NC State he played in 26 games and had 97 tackles and five interceptions.

Fitzgerald transferred to the University of Southern California (USC) for the 2025 season. He finished the year with 51 total tackles, three passes defended, a sack, and five interceptions, with one being returned for a touchdown. For the year, he earned a consensus All-American nod from the Associated Press (AP) as well as being selected First-team All-Big Ten.

== Professional career ==
Pre-draft measurables
Height	Weight	Arm length	Hand span	Wingspan	40-yard dash	10-yard split	20-yard split	20-yard shuttle	Three-cone drill	Vertical jump	Bench press
5 ft 11 in (1.80 m)	201 lb (91 kg)	31 1/4 in (0.79 m)	9 1/2 in (0.24 m)	6 ft 2 1/8 in (1.88 m)	4.55 s	1.58 s	2.63 s	4.23 s	6.99 s	34.0 in (0.86 m)	12 reps
All values from NFL Combine/Pro Day

=== Tennessee Titans (first stint) ===
On April 30, 2026, after going undrafted in the 2026 NFL draft, Fitzgerald signed with the Tennessee Titans as an undrafted free agent. On August 30, he was waived by the Titans as a part of final roster cuts before the start of the regular season.

=== Pittsburgh Steelers ===
On September 2, 2026, the Pittsburgh Steelers signed Fizgerald to their practice squad.

=== Detroit Lions ===
On September 22, 2026, the Detroit Lions signed Fitzgerald off of the Steelers' practice squad. On November 3, he was waived.

=== Tennessee Titans (second stint) ===
On November 16, 2026, Fitzgerald signed with the Tennessee Titans practice squad.
