= Kamari Ramsey =

American football player (born 2004)

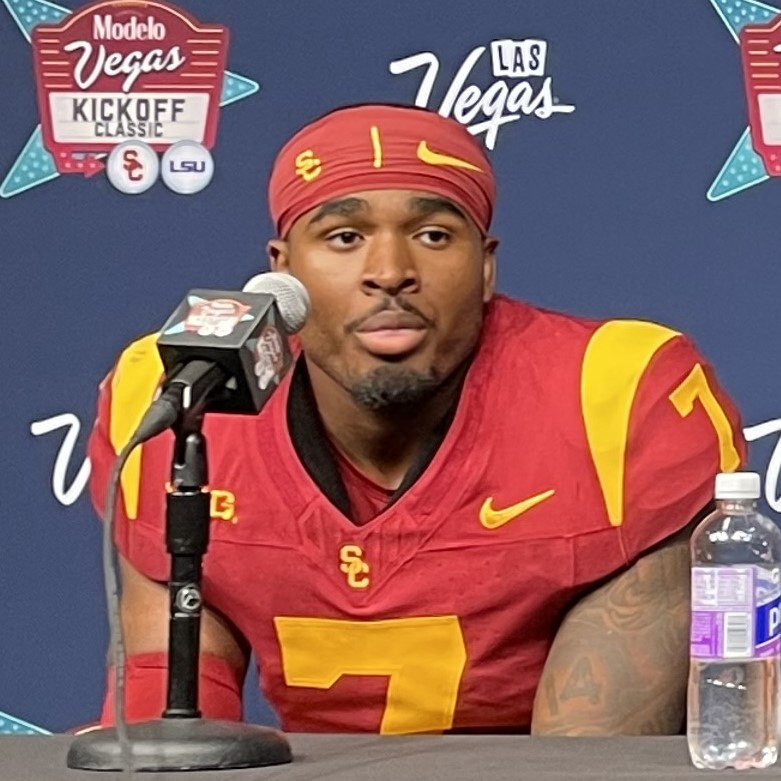
- Ramsey after the 2024 Vegas Kickoff Classic

No. 27 – Houston Texans
- Position: Safety
- Roster status: Active

Personal information
- Born: August 24, 2004 (age 22)
- Listed height: 6 ft 0 in (1.83 m)
- Listed weight: 205 lb (93 kg)

Career information
- High school: Sierra Canyon School (Los Angeles, California)
- College: UCLA (2022–2023); USC (2024–2025)
- NFL draft: 2026: 5th round, 141st overall pick

Career history
- Houston Texans (2026–present)

Career NFL statistics as of Week 10, 2026
- Tackles: 8
- Stats at Pro Football Reference

Kamari Ramsey (born August 24, 2004) is an American professional football safety for the Houston Texans of the National Football League (NFL). He played college football for the UCLA Bruins and USC Trojans and was selected by the Texans in the fifth round of the 2026 NFL draft.

== Early life ==
Ramsey attended Sierra Canyon School in Los Angeles, California. He was rated as a four-star recruit and initially committed to play college football for the Stanford Cardinal before flipping his commitment to the UCLA Bruins.

== College career ==
=== UCLA ===
Ramsey was redshirted as a freshman in 2022, playing in just four games totaling six tackles. In week 12 of the 2023 season, he tallied four tackles in a win over rival USC. In 2023, Ramsey notched 40 tackles with two and a half being for a loss, five pass deflections, and an interception, while allowing just eleven receptions. After the season, Ramsey entered his name into the NCAA transfer portal.

=== USC ===
Ramsey transferred to play for the USC Trojans.

== Professional career ==
Pre-draft measurables
Height	Weight	Arm length	Hand span	Wingspan	40-yard dash	10-yard split	20-yard split	Vertical jump	Broad jump	Bench press
6 ft 0 1/4 in (1.84 m)	202 lb (92 kg)	30 5/8 in (0.78 m)	9 1/4 in (0.23 m)	6 ft 2 5/8 in (1.90 m)	4.47 s	1.57 s	2.60 s	36.0 in (0.91 m)	10 ft 0 in (3.05 m)	16 reps
All values from NFL Combine

Ramsey was selected by the Houston Texans in the fifth round, 141st overall, of the 2026 NFL draft. Houston received the selection a month prior to the draft from the Cleveland Browns in exchange for OT Tytus Howard.
