= King Miller =

American football player

No. 8 – USC Trojans
- Position: Running back
- Class: Redshirt Sophomore

Personal information
- Born: January 17, 2005 (age 21)
- Listed height: 6 ft 0 in (1.83 m)
- Listed weight: 215 lb (98 kg)

Career information
- High school: Calabasas (Calabasas, California)
- College: USC (2024–present)
- Stats at ESPN

King Miller (born January 17, 2005) is an American football running back for the USC Trojans.

== Early life ==
Miller attended Calabasas High School in Calabasas, California. He was rated as a three-star recruit and committed to play college football for the USC Trojans as a preferred walk-on.

== College career ==
As a freshman in 2024, Miller did not appear in any games and was redshirted. In the 2025 season opener, he rushed for a 75-yard touchdown in a win over Missouri State. In week 7, Miller rushed for 158 yards and a touchdown on 18 carries in an upset victory versus Michigan. In week 10, he rushed for 129 yards and a touchdown on 18 carries in a victory over Nebraska.

=== Statistics ===
Legend
**Bold**	Career high

Year	Team	Games		Rushing				Receiving			
Year	Team	GP	GS	Att	Yds	Avg	TD	Rec	Yds	Avg	TD
2024	USC	0	0	Redshirted (redshirt)							
2025	USC	**13**	7	**156**	**972**	**6.2**	**8**	**16**	**111**	**6.9**	0
2026	USC	4	2	64	338	5.3	3	2	6	3.0	0
Career		17	9	220	1,310	6.0	11	18	117	6.5	0

== Personal life ==
Miller has a twin brother named Kaylon, who is also a walk-on for the USC Trojans. He is also the nephew of Dr. Dre and Warren G.
