= 2021 USC Trojans football team =

American college football season

2021 USC Trojans football
- Conference: Pac-12 Conference
- South Division
- Record: 4–8 (3–6 Pac-12)
- Head coach: Clay Helton (6th season; first 2 games); Donte Williams (interim; remainder of season)
- Offensive coordinator: Graham Harrell (3rd season)
- Offensive scheme: Air raid
- Defensive coordinator: Todd Orlando (2nd season)
- Base defense: 3–3–5
- Captain: 4: Vavae Malepeai; Drake London; Isaiah Pola-Mao; Ben Griffiths
- Home stadium: United Airlines Field at the Los Angeles Memorial Coliseum

Uniform
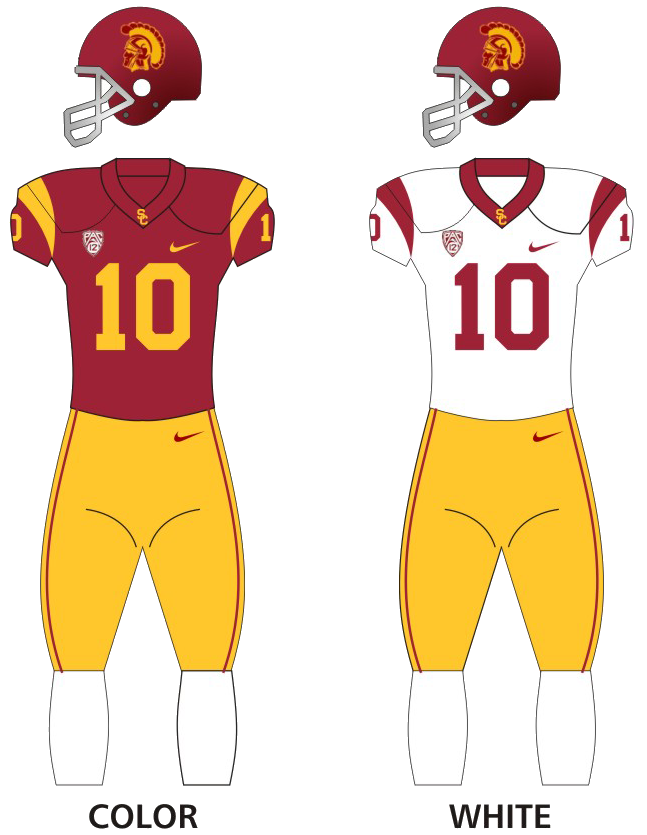

2021 Pac-12 Conference football standings
	Conf.			Overall
Team	W		L	W		L
North Division
No. 22 Oregon xy	7	–	2	10	–	4
Washington State	6	–	3	7	–	6
Oregon State	5	–	4	7	–	6
California	4	–	5	5	–	7
Washington	3	–	6	4	–	8
Stanford	2	–	7	3	–	9
South Division
No. 12 Utah xy$	8	–	1	10	–	4
UCLA	6	–	3	8	–	4
Arizona State†	0	–	3	0	–	5
USC	3	–	6	4	–	8
Colorado	3	–	6	4	–	8
Arizona	1	–	8	1	–	11
Championship: Utah 38, Oregon 10
$ – Conference champion; x – Division champion/co-champions; y – Championship game participant; Rankings from AP Poll

The 2021 USC Trojans football team represented the University of Southern California in the 2021 NCAA Division I FBS football season. They played their home games at the Los Angeles Memorial Coliseum and competed as members of the South Division of the Pac-12 Conference. They were led by sixth-year head coach Clay Helton in the first two games; Helton was fired on September 13 following the team's 42–28 loss to Stanford. Associate head coach Donte Williams took over as the team's interim head coach.

The Trojans finished the 2021 season at 4–8. It was their worst record since 1991, when they went 3–8. (Note: Not counting 2005, when USC originally went 12–1 but later had all 12 of its wins vacated by the NCAA for eligibility violations, thus retroactively giving them an "official" record of 0–1 that year.)

== Offseason ==
=== Transfers ===
The Trojans lost nine players via transfer.

Name	Number	Pos.	Height	Weight	Year	Hometown	Transfer to
Markese Stepp	#30	TB	6'0	235	Sophomore (redshirt)	Indianapolis, IN	Nebraska Cornhuskers
Connor Murphy	#90	DE	6'7	270	Senior (redshirt)	Mesa, AZ	UNLV Rebels
Palaie Gaoteote IV	#1	ILB	6'2	250	Junior	Las Vegas, NV	Ohio State Buckeyes
Abdul-Malik McClain	#42	OLB	6’4	245	Sophomore (redshirt)	Atlanta, GA	Jackson State Tigers
Chase McGrath	#40	K	6'0	190	Junior (redshirt)	Newport Beach, CA	Tennessee Volunteers
Caleb Tremblay	#96	DL	6'5	270	Senior (redshirt)	Napa, CA	Tennessee Volunteers
Munir McClain	#2	WR	6'4	210	Sophomore (redshirt)	Atlanta, GA	Utah Utes
Stephen Carr	#7	TB	6’0	215	Senior (redshirt)	Gardena, CA	Indiana Hoosiers
Jay Toia	#93	DL	6'2	315	Freshman	Inglewood, CA	UCLA Bruins

The Trojans add nine players and one walk-on player via transfer.

Name	Number	Pos.	Height	Weight	Year	Hometown	Transfer from
Ishmael Sopsher	#42	DL	6'4	334	Sophomore (redshirt)	Amite, LA	Alabama Crimson Tide
Xavion Alford	#29	DB	6'0	190	Freshman (redshirt)	Pearland, TX	Texas Longhorns
K.D. Nixon	#21	WR	5'8	190	Senior (redshirt)	DeSoto, TX	Colorado Buffaloes
Keaontay Ingram	#28	TB	6'0	222	Junior (redshirt)	Carthage, TX	Texas Longhorns
Tahj Washington	#16	WR	5'10	170	Freshman (redshirt)	Marshall, TX	Memphis Tigers
Malcolm Epps	#19	TE	6'6	244	Sophomore	Houston, TX	Texas Longhorns
Chris Thompson Jr.	#30	S	6'2	199	Sophomore	Duncanville, TX	Auburn Tigers
Darwin Barlow	#22	TB	5’11	204	Sophomore (redshirt)	Newton, TX	TCU Horned Frogs
Brendan Costello	#29	QB (Walk-On)	6’0	192	Freshman (redshirt)	San Clemente, CA	Oklahoma State Cowboys
Jake Smith	#82	WR	6'0	200	Junior	Scottsdale, AZ	Texas Longhorns

=== Returning Starters ===
USC returns 26 starters in 2021 including 11 on offense, 12 on defense, and 3 on special teams.

Key departures include Amon-Ra St. Brown (WR – 6 games), Tyler Vaughns (WR – 5 games), Alijah Vera-Tucker (OL – 6 games), Marlon Tuipulotu (DT – 6 games), Olaijah Griffin (CB – 5 games), and Talanoa Hufanga (S – 6 games).

==== Offense (11) ====
Player	Class	Position	Games started
Kedon Slovis	–	Quarterback	6 games
Vavae Malepeai	–	Running back	3 games
Drake London	–	Wide receiver	6 games
Bru McCoy	–	Wide receiver	3 games
Erik Krommenhoek	–	Tight end	6 games
Jalen McKenzie	–	Offensive tackle	6 games
Liam Jimmons	–	Offensive guard	6 games
Andrew Vorhees	–	Offensive guard	5 games
Courtland Ford	–	Offensive guard	1 game
Brett Neilon	–	Center	5 games
Justin Dedich	–	Center	1 game

==== Defense (12) ====
Player	Class	Position	Games started
Nick Figueroa	–	Defensive line	5 games
Tuli Tuipulotu	–	Defensive line	4 games
Drake Jackson	–	Defensive end	6 games
Ralen Goforth	–	Linebacker	5 games
Kana'i Mauga	–	Linebacker	4 games
Hunter Echols	–	Outside linebacker	2 games
Chris Steele	–	Cornerback	6 games
Isaac Taylor-Stuart	–	Cornerback	1 game
Greg Johnson	–	Nickelback	3 games
Max Williams	–	Defensive back	3 games
Chase Williams	–	Defensive back	1 game
Isaiah Pola-Mao	–	Safety	6 games

==== Special teams (3) ====
Player	Class	Position	Games started
Parker Lewis	–	Kicker	6 games
Ben Griffiths	–	Punter	6 games
Damon Johnson	–	Long snapper	6 games

=== 2021 NFL draft ===
The official list of participants for the 2021 Senior Bowl included USC football player Marlon Tuipulotu (DT).

The official list of participants for the 2021 NFL Combine included USC football players to be announced soon.

==== Team players drafted into the NFL ====
Player	Position	Round	Pick	NFL Team
Alijah Vera-Tucker	Offensive tackle	1	14	New York Jets
Jay Tufele	Defensive tackle	4	106	Jacksonville Jaguars
Amon-Ra St. Brown	Wide receiver	4	112	Detroit Lions
Talanoa Hufanga	Safety	5	180	San Francisco 49ers
Marlon Tuipulotu	Defensive tackle	6	189	Philadelphia Eagles
Olaijah Griffin	Cornerback	UDFA	–	Buffalo Bills
Tyler Vaughns	Wide receiver	UDFA	–	Indianapolis Colts

=== Recruiting class ===
College recruiting (2021)
Name	Hometown	School	Height	Weight	Commit date
Korey Foreman #1 DL #1 nat.	Corona, California	Centennial High School	6 ft 4 in (1.93 m)	265 lb (120 kg)	December 16, 2020 (Signed) / January 2, 2021 (Committed)
Korey Foreman #1 DL #1 nat.	Recruit ratings: Rivals: 247Sports: ESPN: (91)				
Raesjon Davis #6 LB #48 nat.	Santa Ana, California	Mater Dei High School	6 ft 1 in (1.85 m)	215 lb (98 kg)	February 2, 2021 (Signed) / February 2, 2021 (Committed)
Raesjon Davis #6 LB #48 nat.	Recruit ratings: Rivals: 247Sports: ESPN: (–)				
Jaxson Dart #9 QB #68 nat.	Kaysville, Utah	Corner Canyon High School	6 ft 3 in (1.91 m)	210 lb (95 kg)	December 16, 2020 (Signed) / December 16, 2020 (Committed)
Jaxson Dart #9 QB #68 nat.	Recruit ratings: Rivals: 247Sports: ESPN: (85)				
Miller Moss #11 QB #75 nat.	Los Angeles, California	Bishop Alemany High School	6 ft 2 in (1.88 m)	197 lb (89 kg)	December 16, 2020 (Signed) / June 1, 2020 (Committed)
Miller Moss #11 QB #75 nat.	Recruit ratings: Rivals: 247Sports: ESPN: (87)				
Ceyair Wright #6 CB #79 nat.	Los Angeles, California	Loyola High School	6 ft 1 in (1.85 m)	175 lb (79 kg)	February 2, 2021 (Signed) / January 2, 2021 (Committed)
Ceyair Wright #6 CB #79 nat.	Recruit ratings: Rivals: 247Sports: ESPN: (84)				
Julien Simon #14 LB #119 nat.	Tacoma, Washington	Lincoln High School	6 ft 2 in (1.88 m)	221 lb (100 kg)	December 16, 2020 (Signed) / May 10, 2020 (Committed)
Julien Simon #14 LB #119 nat.	Recruit ratings: Rivals: 247Sports: ESPN: (84)				
Kyron Hudson #22 WR #125 nat.	Duarte, California	Mater Dei High School	6 ft 1 in (1.85 m)	200 lb (91 kg)	December 16, 2020 (Signed) / November 30, 2020 (Committed)
Kyron Hudson #22 WR #125 nat.	Recruit ratings: Rivals: 247Sports: ESPN: (84)				
Michael Trigg #4 TE #129 nat.	Tampa, Florida	Carrollwood Day High School	6 ft 4 in (1.93 m)	230 lb (100 kg)	December 16, 2020 (Signed) / October 11, 2020 (Committed)
Michael Trigg #4 TE #129 nat.	Recruit ratings: Rivals: 247Sports: ESPN: (83)				
Prophet Brown #11 CB #162 nat.	Sacramento, California	Monterey Trail High School	5 ft 10 in (1.78 m)	180 lb (82 kg)	December 16, 2020 (Signed) / July 19, 2020 (Committed)
Prophet Brown #11 CB #162 nat.	Recruit ratings: Rivals: 247Sports: ESPN: (80)				
Calen Bullock #9 ATH (S) #200 nat.	Pasadena, California	John Muir High School	6 ft 2 in (1.88 m)	175 lb (79 kg)	December 16, 2020 (Signed) / April 18, 2020 (Committed)
Calen Bullock #9 ATH (S) #200 nat.	Recruit ratings: Rivals: 247Sports: ESPN: (78)				
Anthony Beavers Jr. #10 ATH (S) #220 nat.	Baldwin Hills, California	St. Bernard High School	6 ft 1 in (1.85 m)	195 lb (88 kg)	December 16, 2020 (Signed) / April 15, 2020 (Committed)
Anthony Beavers Jr. #10 ATH (S) #220 nat.	Recruit ratings: Rivals: 247Sports: ESPN: (83)				
Xamarion Gordon #21 S #314 nat.	Downey, California	Warren High School	6 ft 2 in (1.88 m)	190 lb (86 kg)	December 16, 2020 (Signed) / April 3, 2020 (Committed)
Xamarion Gordon #21 S #314 nat.	Recruit ratings: Rivals: 247Sports: ESPN: (80)				
Jaylin Smith #19 ATH (CB) #327 nat.	Palmdale, California	Bishop Alemany High School	5 ft 11 in (1.80 m)	180 lb (82 kg)	December 16, 2020 (Signed) / June 30, 2020 (Committed)
Jaylin Smith #19 ATH (CB) #327 nat.	Recruit ratings: Rivals: 247Sports: ESPN: (78)				
Brandon Campbell #22 TB #341 nat.	Katy, Texas	Lamar Consolidated High School	5 ft 10 in (1.78 m)	190 lb (86 kg)	December 16, 2020 (Signed) / March 28, 2020 (Committed)
Brandon Campbell #22 TB #341 nat.	Recruit ratings: Rivals: 247Sports: ESPN: (80)				
Michael Jackson III #59 WR #366 nat.	Las Vegas, Nevada	Desert Pines High School	6 ft 0 in (1.83 m)	198 lb (90 kg)	December 16, 2020 (Signed) / June 3, 2020 (Committed)
Michael Jackson III #59 WR #366 nat.	Recruit ratings: Rivals: 247Sports: ESPN: (75)				
Mason Murphy #28 OT #387 nat.	Riverside, California	J Serra Catholic High School	6 ft 5 in (1.96 m)	290 lb (130 kg)	December 16, 2020 (Signed) / March 11, 2020 (Committed)
Mason Murphy #28 OT #387 nat.	Recruit ratings: Rivals: 247Sports: ESPN: (78)				
Lake McRee #22 TE #489 nat.	Austin, Texas	Lake Travis High School	6 ft 4 in (1.93 m)	217 lb (98 kg)	December 16, 2020 (Signed) / June 5, 2020 (Committed)
Lake McRee #22 TE #489 nat.	Recruit ratings: Rivals: 247Sports: ESPN: (80)				
Colin Mobley #65 DL #513 nat.	Washington, D.C.	DeMatha Catholic High School	6 ft 4 in (1.93 m)	260 lb (120 kg)	December 16, 2020 (Signed) / May 15, 2020 (Committed)
Colin Mobley #65 DL #513 nat.	Recruit ratings: Rivals: 247Sports: ESPN: (79)				
Joseph Manjack IV #106 WR #689 nat.	Tomball, Texas	Tomball Memorial High School	6 ft 3 in (1.91 m)	200 lb (91 kg)	December 16, 2020 (Signed) / December 16, 2020 (Committed)
Joseph Manjack IV #106 WR #689 nat.	Recruit ratings: Rivals: 247Sports: ESPN: (78)				
Ty Buchanan #52 IOL #804 nat.	Corpus Christi, Texas	Calallen High School	6 ft 5 in (1.96 m)	280 lb (130 kg)	December 16, 2020 (Signed) / October 1, 2020 (Committed)
Ty Buchanan #52 IOL #804 nat.	Recruit ratings: Rivals: 247Sports: ESPN: (78)				
Maximus Gibbs #60 IOL #908 nat.	Norwalk, California	St. John Bosco High School	6 ft 6 in (1.98 m)	385 lb (175 kg)	December 16, 2020 (Signed) / April 17, 2020 (Committed)
Maximus Gibbs #60 IOL #908 nat.	Recruit ratings: Rivals: 247Sports: ESPN: (75)				
Denis Lynch; K	Newbury Park, California	Newbury Park High School	5 ft 7 in (1.70 m)	175 lb (79 kg)	Walk-On
Denis Lynch; K	Recruit ratings: Rivals: 247Sports: ESPN: (–)				
Josiah Zamora; WR	Santa Ana, California	Mater Dei High School	5 ft 9 in (1.75 m)	150 lb (68 kg)	Walk-On
Josiah Zamora; WR	Recruit ratings: Rivals: 247Sports: ESPN: (–)				
Overall recruit ranking: Scout: – Rivals: #8 247Sports: #8 ESPN: #8
Note: In many cases, Scout, Rivals, 247Sports, On3, and ESPN may conflict in their listings of height and weight.; In these cases, the average was taken. ESPN grades are on a 100-point scale.; Sources: "2021 Team Ranking". Rivals.com.

== Personnel ==
=== Coaching staff ===
Name	Position	Seasons at USC	Alma mater	Before USC
Donte Williams	Interim head coach	2	Idaho State (2006)	Oregon – Cornerbacks coach (2019)
Graham Harrell	Offensive coordinator / quarterbacks coach	3	Texas Tech (2009)	North Texas – Offensive coordinator / quarterbacks coach (2018)
Todd Orlando	Defensive coordinator	2	Wisconsin (1993)	Texas – Defensive coordinator / linebackers coach (2019)
Sean Snyder	Special teams coordinator	2	Kansas State (1993)	Kansas State – Assistant head coach / special teams coordinator / senior special teams analyst (2019)
Mike Jinks	Tailbacks coach	3	Angelo State (1993)	Bowling Green – Head coach (2018)
Keary Colbert	Wide receivers coach	7	USC (2006)	Alabama – Offensive analyst (2015)
Seth Doege	Tight ends coach	3	Texas Tech (2011)	Bowling Green – Special Teams coordinator / wide receivers coach (2018)
Clay McGuire	Offensive line coach	1	Texas Tech (2004)	Texas State – Offensive line coach (2020)
Vic So'oto	Defensive line coach	2	BYU (2011)	Virginia – Defensive line coach (2019)
Michael Hutchings	Linebackers coach	4	USC (2017)	USC – Defensive quality control analyst (2021)
Craig Naivar	Defensive backs coach	2	Hardin-Simmons (1993)	Texas – Co-Defensive coordinator / Safeties coach (2019)
Robert Stiner Jr.	Director of Football Sports Performance	1	Belhaven (2008)	Notre Dame – Assistant director of football strength and conditioning (2020)

=== Roster ===
2021 USC Trojans football roster
Quarterbacks: 2 Jaxson Dart Freshman (6'3, 215); 7 Miller Moss Freshman (6'2, 205); 9 Kedon Slovis Junior (6'3, 205); 29 Brendan Costello (redshirt) Sophomore (6'0, 195); 30 Mo Hasan (redshirt) Senior (6'3, 200); 31 Isaac Ward (redshirt) Freshman (6'0, 185); 38 Brad Aoki (redshirt) Junior (5'9, 170); Tailbacks: 6 Vavae Malepeai (redshirt) Senior (6'0, 220); 22 Darwin Barlow (redshirt) Sophomore (5'11, 205); 23 Kenan Christon Junior (5'10, 185); 25 Brandon Campbell Freshman (5'11, 210); 26 Samuel Oram-Jones (redshirt) Senior (5'8, 195); 27 Quincy Jountti (redshirt) Senior (5'11, 210); 28 Keaontay Ingram Senior (6'0, 215); 34 Matt Colombo (redshirt) Freshman (5'11, 195); Tight ends: 8 Michael Trigg Freshman (6'4, 245); 18 Jude Wolfe (redshirt) Sophomore (6'6, 245); 19 Michael Epps (redshirt) Junior (6'6, 245); 46 Grant Jones (redshirt) Senior (6'2, 220); 83 Josh Falo (redshirt) Senior (6'6, 245); 84 Erik Krommenhoek (redshirt) Senior (6'6, 250); 85 Ethan Rae (redshirt) Sophomore (6'5, 235); 87 Lake McRee Freshman (6'4, 235); 88 Kohl Hollinquest (redshirt) Senior (6'4, 240); 89 Sean Mahoney (redshirt) Sophomore (6'6, 230); Wide receivers: 1 Gary Bryant Jr. Sophomore (5'11, 180); 4 Bru McCoy (redshirt) Sophomore (6'3, 220); 10 Kyron Hudson Freshman (6'2, 215); 13 Michael Jackson III Freshman (6'0, 190); 14 Joseph Manjack IV Freshman (6'3, 205); 15 Drake London Junior (6'5, 210); 16 Tahj Washington (redshirt) Sophomore (5'11, 175); 17 Zach Wilson (redshirt) Junior (6'1, 210); 21 K.D. Nixon (redshirt) Senior (5'8, 190); 40 Ty Shamblin (redshirt) Freshman (6'0, 190); 41 Brandon Outlaw (redshirt) Senior (5'9, 170); 42 Danny Ryan (redshirt) Freshman (6'2, 175); 44 Josiah Zamora Freshman (5'10, 175); 49 Grant Zane Freshman (6'3, 190); 80 John Jackson III Junior (6'1, 210); 81 Kyle Ford (redshirt) Sophomore (6'2, 225); 82 Jake Smith Junior (6'0, 200); 86 Chase Locke (redshirt) Sophomore (6'3, 195)	Offensive line: 51 Casey Collier (redshirt) Freshman (6'7, 300); 56 Andres Dewerk (redshirt) Freshman (6'7, 310); 57 Justin Dedich (redshirt) Junior (6'2, 300); 60 Maximus Gibbs Freshman (6'7, 390); 61 Joe Bryson (redshirt) Junior (6'8, 295); 62 Brett Neilon (redshirt) Senior (6'2, 295); 63 Damian Lopez (redshirt) Senior (6'5, 305); 64 AJ Mageo (redshirt) Junior (6'5, 310); 66 Gino Quinones (redshirt) Sophomore (6'4, 295); 68 Liam Douglass (redshirt) Junior (6'5, 315); 69 Mark Zuvich (redshirt) Junior (6'3, 245); 70 Jalen McKenzie (redshirt) Senior (6'5, 320); 71 Liam Jimmons (redshirt) Senior (6'5, 320); 72 Andrew Vorhees (redshirt) Senior (6'6, 320); 73 Caadyn Stephen (redshirt) Freshman (6'5, 305); 74 Courtland Ford (redshirt) Freshman (6'6, 305); 75 Ty Buchanan Freshman (6'6, 285); 76 Mason Murphy Freshman (6'6, 315); 77 Jason Rodriguez (redshirt) Sophomore (6'6, 310); 78 Andrew Milek (redshirt) Freshman (6'5, 305); 79 Jonah Monheim (redshirt) Freshman (6'5, 295); Defensive line: 0 Korey Foreman Freshman (6'5, 265); 42 Ishmael Sopsher (redshirt) Sophomore (6'4, 330); 47 Stanley Ta’ufo’ou (redshirt) Sophomore (6'3, 275); 49 Tuli Tuipulotu Sophomore (6'4, 290); 50 Nick Figueroa (redshirt) Senior (6'5, 275); 77 Jamar Sekona (redshirt) Freshman (6'2, 295); 79 De’jon Benton (redshirt) Sophomore (6'2, 270); 90 Colin Mobley Freshman (6'4, 275); 91 Brandon Pili (redshirt) Senior (6'4, 325); 94 Kobe Pepe (redshirt) Freshman (6'2, 310); 95 Maninoa Tufono (redshirt) Sophomore (6'3, 290); 97 Jacob Lichtenstein (redshirt) Junior (6'6, 270); Outside Linebackers: 31 Hunter Echols (redshirt) Senior (6'5, 245); 41 Juliano Falaniko (redshirt) Senior (6'4, 230); 48 Peter Esparza (redshirt) Junior (6'1, 210); 99 Drake Jackson Junior (6'4, 250); Snappers: 39 Jac Casasante (redshirt) Junior (6'0, 215); 53 Nathan Weneta (redshirt) Freshman (6'2, 210); 59 Damon Johnson (redshirt) Senior (6'0, 210)	Linebackers: 9 Raesjon Davis Freshman (6'1, 215); 10 Ralen Goforth Junior (6'2, 235); 17 Micah Croom (redshirt) Senior (6'1, 225); 18 Raymond Scott (redshirt) Junior (6'2, 235); 24 Julien Simon Freshman (6'2, 240); 26 Kana'i Mauga Senior (6'2, 245); 34 Eli’jah Winston (redshirt) Junior (6'3, 240); 35 Kaulana Makaula (redshirt) Sophomore (6'3, 220); 36 Clyde Moore (redshirt) Sophomore (6'0, 225); 44 Tuasivi Nomura (redshirt) Sophomore (6'1, 240); 52 Spencer Gilbert (redshirt) Junior (6'0, 220); 54 Tayler Katoa (redshirt) Junior (6'2, 240); 57 Danny Lockhart II (redshirt) Freshman (6'0, 225); 58 Solomon Tuliaupupu (redshirt) Junior (6'3, 225); Cornerbacks: 2 Ceyair Wright Freshman (6'2, 180); 6 Isaac Taylor-Stuart (redshirt) Junior (6'2, 200); 8 Chris Steele Junior (6'1, 190); 13 Adonis Otey (redshirt) Sophomore (6'1, 185); 14 Jayden Williams Junior (6'1, 195); 16 Prophet Brown Freshman (6'0, 185); 22 Dorian Hewett Junior (6'0, 180); 23 Joshua Jackson Jr. (redshirt) Freshman (6'1, 195); 40 L Simpson (redshirt) Freshman (6'2, 190); Safeties: 1 Greg Johnson (redshirt) Senior (5'11, 195); 4 Max Williams (redshirt) Sophomore (5'9, 180); 7 Chase Williams (redshirt) Junior (6'2, 200); 15 Anthony Beavers Jr. Freshman (6'1, 200); 16 Jaylin Smith Freshman (5'11, 180); 21 Isaiah Pola-Mao (redshirt) Senior (6'4, 205); 25 Briton Allen Junior (6'0, 195); 27 Calen Bullock Freshman (6'3, 180); 28 Xamarion Gordon Freshman (6'2, 205); 29 Xavion Alford Jr. (redshirt) Freshman (6'0, 190); 30 Chris Thompson Jr. Sophomore (6'1, 210); 37 Tommy Maurice (redshirt) Freshman (5'9, 185); Kickers: 38 Alex Stadthaus (redshirt) Junior (6'2, 195); 46 Denis Lynch Freshman (5'8, 185); 48 Parker Lewis Sophomore (6'3, 205); Punters: 24 Ben Griffiths (redshirt) Junior (6'7, 240); 35 Michael McAllister (redshirt) Freshman (6'2, 215); 36 Will Rose (redshirt) Sophomore (6'2, 190)
2021 USC Football Roster (09/05/2021)

=== Depth chart ===
Defense

FS
Isaiah Pola-Mao
Xavion Alford Jr.
Xamarion Gordon

Nickelback	Mac LB	Rover LB	B-Backer
Greg Johnson	Kana'i Mauga	Ralen Goforth	Drake Jackson
Jaylin Smith	Tuasivi Nomura	Raymond Scott	Hunter Echols
Calen Bullock	Julien Simon	Raesjon Davis	Juliano Falaniko

SS
Chase Williams
Chris Thompson Jr.
Anthony Beavers Jr.

CB
Chris Steele
J. Williams
Prophet Brown

DE	NT	DE
Nick Figueroa	Stanley Ta’ufo’ou	Tuli Tuipulotu
Korey Foreman	Jamar Sekona	Jacob Lichtenstein
De'jon Benton	Ishmael Sopsher	Colin Mobley

CB
Isaac Taylor-Stuart
Joshua Jackson Jr.
Ceyair Wright

Offense

WR-X
Kyle Ford
Kyron Hudson
-

WR-Y / WR-A
Michael Trigg / Gary Bryant Jr.
Malcolm Epps / John Jackson III
Joseph Manjack IV

LT	LG	C	RG	RT
Courtland Ford	Andrew Vorhees	Brett Neilon	Liam Jimmons	Jalen McKenzie
Mason Murphy	Justin Dedich	Andrew Milek	Liam Douglass	Jonah Monheim
-	-	-	-	-

TE
Erik Krommenhoek
Jude Wolfe
Lake McRee

WR-Z
Tahj Washington
K. D. Nixon
Mike Jackson III

QB
Kedon Slovis
Jaxson Dart
Miller Moss

RB
Keaontay Ingram
Vavae Malepeai
Darwin Barlow

Special teams
PK Parker Lewis
PK Andrew Stadthaus
P Ben Griffiths
P Will Rose
KR Gary Bryant Jr. Brown
Tahj Washington
PR Gary Bryant Jr. Brown
K. D. Nixon
LS Damon Johnson
H B. Griffiths

- Depth Chart after Week 9 vs. Arizona Wildcats

True Freshman

=== Scholarship distribution chart ===
Position	Freshman (31)	Sophomore (20)	Junior (23)	Senior (21)	2022 commits (9)	2023 commit (1)	2024 commit (1)	2025 commit (1)
QB 4 (0)	Jaxson Dart; Miller Moss	–	Kedon Slovis	Mo Hasan	-	-	-	-
TB 6 (1)	Brandon Campbell	Darwin Barlow	Kenan Christon	Keaontay Ingram; Quincy Jountti; Vavae Malepeai	-	Johnny Thompson Jr.	-	-
WR 11 (2)	Michael Jackson III; Joseph Manjack IV; Kyron Hudson	Gary Bryant Jr. Kyle Ford; Bru McCoy; Tahj Washington	John Jackson III; Drake London; Jake Smith	K.D. Nixon	Caleb Douglas; Kevin Green Jr.	–	Jason Robinson Jr.	-
TE 7 (8)	Lake McRee; Michael Trigg	Ethan Rae; Jude Wolfe	Michael Epps	Josh Falo; Erik Krommenhoek	-	–	-	-
OL 18 (1)	Ty Buchanan; Casey Collier; Andres Dewerk; Courtland Ford; Maximus Gibbs; Andrew Milek; Jonah Monheim; Mason Murphy; Caadyn Stephen	Gino Quinones; Jason Rodriguez	Justin Dedich; Liam Douglass	Liam Jimmons; Frank Martin II; Jalen McKenzie; Brett Neilon; Andrew Vorhees	Keith Olson	–	-	-
DL 11 (0)	Colin Mobley; Kobe Pepe; Jamar Sekona	De'jon Benton; Ishmael Sopsher; Stanley Ta'ufo'ou; Maninoa Tufono; Tuli Tuipulotu	Jacob Lichtenstein	Nick Figueroa; Brandon Pili	-	–	-	-
B-BACKER 4 (1)	Korey Foreman	–	Drake Jackson	Hunter Echols; Juliano Falaniko	Devan Thompkins	–	-	-
LB 12 (0)	Raesjon Davis; Julien Simon	Kaulana Makaula; Tuasivi Nomura	Spencer Gilbert; Ralen Goforth; Tayler Katoa; Raymond Scott; Solomon Tuliaupupu; Eli'Jah Winston	Micah Croom; Kana'i Mauga	-	–	-	-
CB 8 (2)	Prophet Brown; Joshua Jackson Jr. Ceyair Wright	Adonis Otey	Dorian Hewett; Chris Steele; Isaac Taylor-Stuart; Jayden Williams	–	Jaeden Gould; Fabian Ross	–	-	-
NK 3 (1)	Jaylin Smith	Max Williams	–	Greg Johnson	Ephesians Prysock	–	-	-
S 8 (0)	Xavion Alford; Anthony Beavers Jr. Calen Bullock; Xamarion Gordon	Chris Thompson Jr.	Briton Allen; Chase Williams	Isaiah Pola-Mao	-	–	-	-
SP 3 (2)	–	Parker Lewis	Ben Griffiths	Damon Johnson	Atticus Bertrams; Daniel Meunier	–	-	-
ATH (0)	x	x	x	x	–	–	-	Arron White

redshirt year used / redshirt year eligible / * Former Walk-on

– 85 scholarships permitted, 95 currently allotted to players via extra Seniors.

– 95 recruited players on scholarship

Scholarship Distribution 2021

== Schedule ==
=== Spring Game ===
Date	Time	Spring Game	Site	Result
April 17, 2021	1:00 p.m. PDT	Cardinal vs Gold	United Airlines Field at the Los Angeles Memorial Coliseum • Los Angeles, CA	Gold 27–7

=== 2021 Cardinal vs Gold Spring Game ===
USC Cardinal at USC Gold

Quarter	1	2	3	4	Total
USC Cardinal	0	13	7	7	27
USC Gold	7	0	0	0	7

at Los Angeles Memorial Coliseum, Los Angeles, CA

- Date: April 17th, 2021
- Game time: 1:00 p.m. PDT
- TV: P12N

=== Regular season ===
Date	Time	Opponent	Rank	Site	TV	Result	Attendance
September 4	2:00 p.m.	San Jose State*	No. 15	Los Angeles Memorial Coliseum; Los Angeles, CA	P12N	W 30–7	54,398
September 11	7:30 p.m.	Stanford	No. 14	Los Angeles Memorial Coliseum; Los Angeles, CA (rivalry)	FOX	L 28–42	56,945
September 18	12:30 p.m.	at Washington State		Martin Stadium; Pullman, WA	FOX	W 45–14	24,714
September 25	7:30 p.m.	Oregon State		Los Angeles Memorial Coliseum; Los Angeles, CA	FS1	L 27–45	51,564
October 2	11:00 a.m.	at Colorado		Folsom Field; Boulder, CO	P12N	W 37–14	48,197
October 9	5:00 p.m.	Utah		Los Angeles Memorial Coliseum; Los Angeles, CA	FOX	L 26–42	54,088
October 23	4:30 p.m.	at No. 13 Notre Dame*		Notre Dame Stadium; Notre Dame, IN (rivalry)	NBC	L 16–31	77,622
October 30	4:00 p.m.	Arizona^{†}		Los Angeles Memorial Coliseum; Los Angeles, CA	ESPNU	W 41–34	52,435
November 6	7:30 p.m.	at Arizona State		Sun Devil Stadium; Tempe, AZ	ESPN	L 16–31	53,926
November 20	1:00 p.m.	UCLA		Los Angeles Memorial Coliseum; Los Angeles, CA (Victory Bell)	FOX	L 33–62	68,152
November 27	7:30 p.m.	No. 13 BYU*		Los Angeles Memorial Coliseum; Los Angeles, CA	ESPN	L 31–35	55,926
December 4 (Note: The USC–California game, originally scheduled for November 13 at 12:30 p.m., was postponed on November 9 due to a COVID-19 outbreak among the Golden Bears and rescheduled for December 4. On November 11, the game was officially given a kickoff time of 8:00 p.m. PST on FS1.)	8:00 p.m.	at California		California Memorial Stadium; Berkeley, CA	FS1	L 14–24	42,076
*Non-conference game; ^{†}Homecoming; Rankings from AP Poll (and CFP Rankings, after November 2) - Released prior to game; All times are in Pacific time

Conference opponents not played this season: Oregon, Washington

== Game summaries ==
=== San José State ===
San José State Spartans vs USC Trojans

Quarter	1	2	3	4	Total
Spartans	0	0	7	0	7
No. 15 Trojans	10	3	0	17	30

at Los Angeles Memorial Coliseum, Los Angeles, CA

- Date: September 4, 2021
- Game time: 2:00 p.m. PDT
- Game weather: 88 °F (31 °C) • Weather: Clear, Sunny
- Game attendance: 54,398
- Referee: Mike McCabe
- TV announcers (P12N): Ted Robinson (play-by-play), Yogi Roth (analyst)

Statistics	SJSU	USC
First downs	19	21
Plays–yards	65–375	70–423
Rushes–yards	19–67	34–160
Passing yards	308	263
Passing: comp–att–int	24–46–2	25–36–0
Turnovers		
Time of possession	28:00	32:00

Team	Category	Player	Statistics
SJSU	Passing	Nick Starkel	24–46 308yds, 2INT
SJSU	Rushing	Tyler Nevens	15run 58yds, 1 TD
SJSU	Receiving	Isaiah Hamilton	6rec 74yds
USC	Passing	Kedon Slovis	24–36 256yds, 2 TD
USC	Rushing	Keaontay Ingram	15run 86yds
USC	Receiving	Drake London	12rec 137yds

Scoring summary

Quarter	Time	Drive			Team	Scoring information	Score	
Quarter	Time	Plays	Yards	TOP	Team	Scoring information	SJSU	USC
1st	9:40	11	55	4:28	USC	27-yard field goal by Parker Lewis (#48)	0	3
1st	7:01	3	32	0:40	USC	Tahj Washington (#16) 29-yard touchdown reception from Kedon Slovis (#9), Parker Lewis (#48) kick good	0	10
2nd	4:38	12	60	4:33	USC	23-yard field goal by Parker Lewis (#48)	0	13
3rd	7:25	12	74	5:27	SJSU	Tyler Nevens (#23) 2-yard touchdown run, Matt Mercurio (#39) kick good	7	13
4th	13:41	12	62	5:54	USC	30-yard field goal by Parker Lewis (#48)	7	16
4th	12:28	1	37	-	USC	Interception returned 37 yards for touchdown by Greg Johnson (#1), Parker Lewis (#48) kick good	7	23
4st	2:07	9	91	5:18	USC	Erik Krommenhoek (#84) 20-yard touchdown reception from Kedon Slovis (#9), Parker Lewis (#48) kick good	7	30
"TOP" = time of possession. For other American football terms, see Glossary of American football.							7	30

=== Stanford ===
Stanford Cardinal vs USC Trojans

Quarter	1	2	3	4	Total
Cardinal	7	14	14	7	42
No. 14 Trojans	0	10	3	15	28

at Los Angeles Memorial Coliseum, Los Angeles, CA

- Date: September 11, 2021
- Game time: 7:30 p.m. PDT
- Game weather: 75 °F (24 °C) • Weather: Clear, Wind at 3 MPH
- Game attendance: 56,945
- Referee: Michael Mothershed
- TV announcers (FOX): Tim Brando (play-by-play) and Spencer Tillman (analyst)

Statistics	STAN	USC
First downs	18	24
Plays–yards	53–375	75–408
Rushes–yards	30–141	33–185
Passing yards	234	223
Passing: comp–att–int	16–23–0	27–42–1
Turnovers		
Time of possession	27:54	32:02

Team	Category	Player	Statistics
STAN	Passing	Tanner McKee	16–23 234yds 2 TDs
STAN	Rushing	Nathaniel Peat	6 carries 118yds 1 TD
STAN	Receiving	Elijah Higgins	5 receptions 67yds 1 TD
USC	Passing	Kedon Slovis	27–42 223yds 1 TD 1 INT
USC	Rushing	Vavae Malepeai	15 carries 94yds
USC	Receiving	Drake London	4 receptions 68yds 1 TD

Scoring summary

Quarter	Time	Drive			Team	Scoring information	Score	
Quarter	Time	Plays	Yards	TOP	Team	Scoring information	STAN	USC
1	9:04	1	87	0:12	STAN	Nathaniel Peat (#8) 87-yard touchdown run, Joshua Karty (#43) kick good	7	0
2	13:28	15	95	5:26	USC	Keanotay Ingram (#28) 2-yard touchdown run, Alex Stadthaus (#38) kick good	7	7
2	8:39	9	70	4:49	STAN	Elijah Higgins (#6) 3-yard touchdown reception from Tanner McKee (#18), Joshua Karty (#43) kick good	14	7
2	1:56	15	68	6:38	USC	24-yard field goal by Alex Stadthaus (#38)	14	10
2	0:09	4	66	1:47	STAN	Brycen Tremayne (#81) 6-yard touchdown reception from Tanner McKee (#18), Joshua Karty (#43) kick good	21	10
3	9:14	12	59	5:46	USC	33-yard field goal by Alex Stadthaus (#38)	21	13
3	5:02	3	5	-	STAN	Interception returned 31 yards for touchdown by Kyu Blu Kelly (#17), Joshua Karty (#43) kick good	28	13
3	0:25	5	56	2:15	STAN	Tanner McKee (#18) 1-yard touchdown run, Joshua Karty (#43) kick good	35	13
4	9:16	10	67	5:44	STAN	Isaiah Sanders (#0) 2-yard touchdown run, Joshua Karty (#43) kick good	42	13
4	5:54	9	75	3:22	USC	Drake London (#15) 11-yard touchdown reception from Kedon Slovis (#9), Alex Stadthaus (#38) kick good	42	20
4	0:46	10	69	2:39	USC	Darwin Barlow 4-yard touchdown run, 2-point pass good	42	28
"TOP" = time of possession. For other American football terms, see Glossary of American football.							42	28

=== At Washington State ===
USC Trojans at Washington State Cougars

Quarter	1	2	3	4	Total
Trojans	0	7	28	10	45
Cougars	7	7	0	0	14

at Martin Stadium, Pullman, WA

- Date: September 18, 2021
- Game time: 12:30 p.m. PDT
- Game weather: Cloudy
- Game attendance: 24,714
- Referee: Chris Coyte
- TV announcers (FOX): Joe Davis (play-by-play) and Brock Huard (analyst)

Statistics	USC	WSU
First downs	24	15
Plays–yards	73–447	64–279
Rushes–yards	25–48	30–99
Passing yards	399	180
Passing: comp–att–int	31–48–2	20–34–2
Turnovers		
Time of possession	29:43	30:17

Team	Category	Player	Statistics
USC	Passing	Jaxson Dart	30–46 391yds, 4 TD 2 INT
USC	Rushing	Jaxson Dart	6run 32yds
USC	Receiving	Drake London	13rec 170yds, 2 TD
WSU	Passing	Jayden de Laura	10–14 117yds, 2 TD 1 INT
WSU	Rushing	Max Borghi	13run 72yds
WSU	Receiving	Travell Harris	7rec 49yds, 2 TD

Scoring summary

Quarter	Time	Drive			Team	Scoring information	Score	
Quarter	Time	Plays	Yards	TOP	Team	Scoring information	USC	WSU
1st	6:03	12	89	6:20	WSU	Travell Harris (#1) 12-yard touchdown reception from Jayden de Laura (#4), Dean Janikowski (#49) kick good	0	7
2nd	6:13	7	58	3:20	WSU	Travell Harris (#1) 7-yard touchdown reception from Jayden de Laura (#4), Dean Janikowski (#49) kick good	0	14
2nd	0:32	11	93	3:52	USC	Gary Bryant Jr. (#1) 38-yard touchdown reception from Jaxson Dart (#2), Parker Lewis (#48) kick good	7	14
3rd	12:21	8	27	2:39	USC	Drake London (#15) 5-yard touchdown reception from Jaxson Dart (#2), Parker Lewis (#48) kick good	14	14
3rd	6:16	11	81	4:16	USC	Gary Bryant Jr. (#1) 3-yard touchdown run, Parker Lewis (#48) kick good	21	14
3rd	3:12	2	-5	0:48	USC	Fumble recovery returned 0 yards for touchdown by Tuli Tuipulotu (#49), Parker Lewis (#48) kick good	28	14
3rd	0:46	6	65	2:17	USC	Drake London (#15) 31-yard touchdown reception from Jaxson Dart (#2), Parker Lewis (#48) kick good	35	14
4th	8:49	8	56	3:57	USC	34-yard field goal by Parker Lewis (#48)	38	14
4th	6:12	1	36	0:07	USC	Kyle Ford (#81) 36-yard touchdown reception from Jaxson Dart (#2), Parker Lewis (#48) kick good	45	14
"TOP" = time of possession. For other American football terms, see Glossary of American football.							45	14

=== Oregon State ===
Oregon State Beavers vs USC Trojans

Quarter	1	2	3	4	Total
Beavers	7	14	14	10	45
Trojans	7	10	0	10	27

at Los Angeles Memorial Coliseum, Los Angeles, CA

- Date: September 25, 2021
- Game time: 7:30 p.m. PDT
- Game weather: 64 °F (18 °C); Sunny
- Game attendance: 51,564
- Referee: Matthew Richards
- TV announcers (FS1): Alex Faust (play by play), Petros Papadakis (analyst)

Statistics	OSU	USC
First downs	32	32
Plays–yards	69–532	71–431
Rushes–yards	50–319	22–76
Passing yards	213	355
Passing: comp–att–int	15–19–4	31–49–1
Turnovers		
Time of possession	34:39	25:21

Team	Category	Player	Statistics
OSU	Passing	Chance Nolan	15–19 213yds, 4 TD 2 INT
OSU	Rushing	B. J. Baylor	23run 158yds
OSU	Receiving	Tyjon Lindsey	5rec 102yds, 2 TD
USC	Passing	Kedon Slovis	31–49 355yds, 1 TD 3 INT
USC	Rushing	Keaontay Ingram	14run 79yds, 2 TD
USC	Receiving	Drake London	10rec 165yds

Scoring summary

Quarter	Time	Drive			Team	Scoring information	Score	
Quarter	Time	Plays	Yards	TOP	Team	Scoring information	OSU	USC
1	9:58	6	61	3:10	OSU	Teagan Quitoriano 27-yard touchdown reception from Chance Nolan, Everett Hayes kick good	7	0
1	8:14	5	75	1:44	USC	Gary Bryant Jr. 7-yard touchdown reception from Kedon Slovis, Parker Lewis kick good	7	7
2	13:23	9	80	4:38	USC	Keaontay Ingram 9-yard touchdown run, Parker Lewis kick good	7	14
2	2:50	10	92	5:20	OSU	Tyjon Lindsey 13-yard touchdown reception from Chance Nolan, Everett Hayes kick good	14	14
2	0:44	5	92	0:43	OSU	Tre'Shaun Harrison 36-yard touchdown reception from Chance Nolan, Everett Hayes kick good	21	14
2	0:00	6	66	0:44	USC	26-yard field goal by Parker Lewis	21	17
3	12:06	7	75	5:54	OSU	Tyjon Lindsey 17-yard touchdown reception from Chance Nolan, Everett Hayes kick good	28	17
3	6:33	7	75	2:54	OSU	Jack Colletto 1-yard touchdown run, Everett Hayes kick good	35	17
4	14:14	8	64	4:06	OSU	Jack Colletto 1-yard touchdown run, Everett Hayes kick good	42	17
4	10:26	11	75	3:48	USC	Keaontay Ingram 5-yard touchdown run, Parker Lewis kick good	42	24
4	6:29	6	40	1:59	USC	46-yard field goal by Parker Lewis	42	27
4	0:58	4	6	1:46	OSU	42-yard field goal by Everett Hayes	45	27
"TOP" = time of possession. For other American football terms, see Glossary of American football.							45	27

=== At Colorado ===
USC Trojans at Colorado Buffaloes

Quarter	1	2	3	4	Total
Trojans	10	10	10	7	37
Buffaloes	0	7	7	0	14

at Folsom Field, Boulder, CO

- Date: October 2, 2021
- Game time: 11:00 a.m.
- Game weather: 59° Partly Cloudy
- Game attendance: 48,197
- Referee: Mike McCabe
- TV announcers (P12N): Ted Robinson (play-by-play), Yogi Roth (analyst)

Statistics	USC	COL
First downs	21	13
Plays–yards	64–491	56–244
Rushes–yards	35–215	39–82
Passing yards	276	162
Passing: comp–att–int	19–29–3	10–17–1
Turnovers		
Time of possession	28:49	27:13

Team	Category	Player	Statistics
USC	Passing	Kedon Slovis	19–29 276yds, 3 TD
USC	Rushing	Keaontay Ingram	14run 123yds
USC	Receiving	Drake London	9rec 130yds, 1 TD
COL	Passing	Brendon Lewis	10–17 162yds, 1 TD 1 INT
COL	Rushing	Jarek Broussard	16run 68yds
COL	Receiving	Brady Russell	3rec 87yds

Scoring summary

Quarter	Time	Drive			Team	Scoring information	Score	
Quarter	Time	Plays	Yards	TOP	Team	Scoring information	USC	COL
1st	6:05	14	70	5:19	USC	30-yard field goal by Parker Lewis (#48)	3	0
1st	2:50	5	64	2:47	USC	Drake London (#15) 1-yard touchdown reception from Kedon Slovis (#9), Parker Lewis (#48) kick good	10	0
2nd	11:52	5	85	2:22	USC	Michael Trigg (#8) 46-yard touchdown reception from Kedon Slovis (#9), Parker Lewis (#48) kick good	17	0
2nd	6:56	5	30	2:35	USC	44-yard field goal by Parker Lewis (#48)	20	0
2nd	1:48	6	48	3:06	COL	Deion Smith (#20) 1-yard touchdown run, Cole Becker (#36) kick good	20	7
3rd	10:51	4	-3	1:32	USC	49-yard field goal by Parker Lewis (#48)	23	7
3rd	7:30	4	58	1:16	USC	Vavae Malepeai (#6) 2-yard touchdown run, Parker Lewis (#48) kick good	30	7
3rd	5:54	4	75	1:34	COL	Chase Penry (#3) 7-yard touchdown reception from Brendon Lewis (#12), Cole Becker (#36) kick good	30	14
4th	14:47	5	35	1:56	USC	Gary Bryant Jr. (#1) 15-yard touchdown reception from Kedon Slovis (#9), Parker Lewis (#48) kick good	37	14
"TOP" = time of possession. For other American football terms, see Glossary of American football.							37	14

=== Utah ===
Utah Utes vs USC Trojans

Quarter	1	2	3	4	Total
Utes	7	14	14	7	42
Trojans	3	7	0	16	26

at Los Angeles Memorial Coliseum, Los Angeles, CA

- Date: October 9, 2021
- Game time: 5:00 p.m. PDT
- Game weather: 70 °F (21 °C) • Weather: Sunny
- Game attendance: 54,088
- Referee: Francisco Villar
- TV announcers (FOX): Tim Brando (play-by-play), Spencer Tillman (analyst)

Statistics	UTAH	USC
First downs	23	27
Plays–yards	63–486	78–493
Rushes–yards	35–180	25–92
Passing yards	306	401
Passing: comp–att–int	22–28–0	33–53–1
Turnovers		
Time of possession	28:50	31:10

Team	Category	Player	Statistics
UTAH	Passing	Cameron Rising	22/28 306 yards 3 TDs
UTAH	Rushing	Tavion Thomas	16 carries 113 yards 1 TD
UTAH	Receiving	Devaughn Vele	4 receptions 84 yards 1 TD
USC	Passing	Kedon Slovis	33/53 401 yards 2 TDs 1 INT
USC	Rushing	Keaontay Ingram	14 carries 70 yards
USC	Receiving	Drake London	16 receptions 162 yards 1 TD

Scoring summary

Quarter	Time	Drive			Team	Scoring information	Score	
Quarter	Time	Plays	Yards	TOP	Team	Scoring information	UT	USC
1	3:58	12	53	5:26	USC	28-yard field goal by Parker Lewis (#48)	0	3
1	0:46	8	75	3:31	UTAH	Brant Kuithe (#80) 11-yard touchdown run, Jordan Noyes (#67) kick good	7	3
2	6:49	6	50	2:29	USC	Drake London (#15) 20-yard touchdown reception from Kedon Slovis (#9), Parker Lewis (#48) kick good	7	10
2	4:41	5	75	2:05	UTAH	Money Parks (#10) 12-yard touchdown reception from Cameron Rising (#7), Jordan Noyes (#67) kick good	14	10
2	0:17	7	77	0:57	UTAH	Devaughn Vele (#17) 37-yard touchdown reception from Cameron Rising (#7), Jordan Noyes (#67) kick good	21	10
3	13:24	5	75	2:19	UTAH	Tavion Thomas (#9) 43-yard touchdown run, Jordan Noyes (#67) kick good	28	10
3	9:58	4	40	1:42	UTAH	Cameron Rising (#7) 17-yard touchdown run, Jordan Noyes (#67) kick good	35	10
4	10:27	9	85	2:49	USC	Vavae Malepeai (#6) 2-yard touchdown run, 2-point pass complete	35	18
4	6:20	7	50	4:30	UTAH	Dalton Kincaid (#86) 1-yard touchdown reception from Cameron Rising (#7), Jordan Noyes (#67) kick good	42	18
4	1:19	5	70	1:10	USC	Malcolm Epps (#19) 41-yard touchdown reception from Kedon Slovis (#9), 2-point pass complete	42	26
"TOP" = time of possession. For other American football terms, see Glossary of American football.							42	26

=== At No. 13 Notre Dame ===
USC Trojans at No. 13 Notre Dame Fighting Irish

Quarter	1	2	3	4	Total
Trojans	0	3	0	13	16
No. 13 Fighting Irish	7	10	7	7	31

at Notre Dame Stadium, Notre Dame, IN

- Date: October 23, 2021
- Game time: 4:30 p.m. PDT
- Game weather: Sunny
- Game attendance: 77,622
- Referee: Chris Coyte
- TV announcers (NBC): Mike Tirico (play–by–play), Drew Brees (analyst) and Kathryn Tappen (sideline)

Statistics	USC	ND
First downs	25	26
Plays–yards	69–424	71–383
Rushes–yards	32–125	41–170
Passing yards	299	213
Passing: comp–att–int	27–37–0	22–30–1
Turnovers		
Time of possession	28:37	31:23

Team	Category	Player	Statistics
USC	Passing	Kedon Slovis	27/37 299yds, 1 Int
USC	Rushing	Keaontay Ingram	24run 138yds, 1 TD
USC	Receiving	Drake London	15rec 171yds
ND	Passing	Jack Coan	20/28 189yds, 1 TD 1 Int
ND	Rushing	Kyren Williams	25run 138yds, 2 TD
ND	Receiving	Lorenzo Styles Jr.	3rec 57yds

Scoring summary

Quarter	Time	Drive			Team	Scoring information	Score	
Quarter	Time	Plays	Yards	TOP	Team	Scoring information	USC	ND
1	4:34	11	70	4:59	ND	Avery Davis (#3) 4-yard touchdown reception from Jack Coan (#17), Jonathan Doerer (#39) kick good	0	7
2	13:37	4	1	1:36	ND	21-yard field goal by Jonathan Doerer (#39)	0	10
2	7:37	13	60	5:55	USC	33-yard field goal by Parker Lewis (#48)	3	10
2	4:38	9	75	3:16	ND	Kyren Williams (#23) 5-yard touchdown run, Jonathan Doerer (#39) kick good	3	17
3	3:23	13	80	5:25	ND	Kyren Williams (#23) 1-yard touchdown run, Jonathan Doerer (#39) kick good	3	24
4	15:00	9	77	2:59	USC	Keaontay Ingram (#28) 4-yard touchdown run, Parker Lewis(#48) kick good	10	24
4	9:14	8	86	2:40	USC	Darwin Barlow (#22) 3-yard touchdown run, Parker Lewis (#48) kick missed	16	24
4	5:32	8	75	3:59	ND	Tyler Buchner (#12) 3-yard touchdown run, Jonathan Doerer (#39) kick good	16	31
"TOP" = time of possession. For other American football terms, see Glossary of American football.							16	31

=== Arizona ===
Arizona Wildcats vs USC Trojans

Quarter	1	2	3	4	Total
Wildcats	7	7	7	13	34
Trojans	14	21	3	3	41

at Los Angeles Memorial Coliseum, Los Angeles, CA

- Date: October 30, 2021
- Game time: 4:30 p.m. PDT
- Game weather: -
- Game attendance: 52,435
- Referee: Michael Mothershed
- TV announcers (ESPNU): John Schriffen (play-by-play), Rene Ingoglia (analyst)

Statistics	ARIZ	USC
First downs	24	35
Plays–yards	71–466	81–517
Rushes–yards	32–127	43–216
Passing yards	339	301
Passing: comp–att–int	22–39–1	26–38–4
Turnovers		
Time of possession	27:02	32:58

Team	Category	Player	Statistics
ARIZ	Passing	Will Plummer	20/34 264yds
ARIZ	Rushing	Jalen John	9run 35yds
ARIZ	Receiving	Tayvian Cunningham	3rec 116yds, 1 TD
USC	Passing	Kedon Slovis	14/20 192yds, 2 TD 1 Int
USC	Rushing	Keaontay Ingram	26run 186yds, 1 TD
USC	Receiving	Gary Bryant Jr.	3rec 89yds, 2 TD

Scoring summary

Quarter	Time	Drive			Team	Scoring information	Score	
Quarter	Time	Plays	Yards	TOP	Team	Scoring information	ARIZ	USC
1	12:39	8	75	3:37	USC	Keaontay Ingram (#28) 3-yard touchdown run, Alex Stadthaus (#38) kick good	0	7
1	11:16	3	75	0:52	ARIZ	Tayvian Cunningham (#11) 73-yard touchdown reception from Jamarye Joiner (#10), Tyler Loop (#33) kick good	7	7
1	10:31	2	75	0:38	USC	Gary Bryant Jr. (#1) 62-yard touchdown reception from Kedon Slovis (#9), Alex Stadthaus (#38) kick good	7	14
2	8:17	15	96	5:21	USC	Drake London (#15) 2-yard touchdown reception from Jaxson Dart (#2), Alex Stadthaus (#38) kick good	7	21
2	4:21	6	62	3:05	USC	Drake London (#15) 6-yard touchdown reception from Jaxson Dart (#2), Alex Stadthaus (#38) kick good	7	28
2	2:58	6	75	1:40	ARIZ	Michael Wiley (#6) 1-yard touchdown run, Tyler Loop (#33) kick good	14	28
2	0:49	8	75	2:04	USC	Gary Bryant Jr. (#1) 15-yard touchdown reception from Kedon Slovis (#9), Alex Stadthaus (#38) kick good	14	35
3	11:25	1	37	-	ARIZ	Interception returned 37 yards for touchdown by Anthony Pandy (#8), Tyler Loop (#33) kick good	21	35
3	7:29	12	68	3:56	USC	23-yard field goal by Alex Stadthaus (#38)	21	38
4	13:46	9	60	4:10	ARIZ	Will Plummer (#15) 16-yard touchdown run, Tyler Loop (#33) kick good	28	38
4	6:09	13	72	3:03	ARIZ	25-yard field goal by Tyler Loop (#33)	31	38
4	4:19	5	52	2:45	USC	40-yard field goal by Alex Stadthaus (#38)	31	41
4	1:38	10	52	1:53	ARIZ	40-yard field goal by Tyler Loop (#33)	34	41
"TOP" = time of possession. For other American football terms, see Glossary of American football.							34	41

=== At Arizona State ===
USC Trojans at Arizona State Sun Devils

Quarter	1	2	3	4	Total
Trojans	0	10	6	0	16
Sun Devils	7	7	3	14	31

at Sun Devil Stadium, Tempe, AZ

- Date: November 6, 2021
- Game weather: 77 °F (25 °C) Clear, Sunny
- Game attendance: 53,926
- Referee: Steven Strimling
- TV announcers (ESPN): Dave Flemming, Rod Gilmore, Stormy Buonantony

Statistics	USC	ASU
First downs	20	19
Plays–yards	72–312	62–427
Rushes–yards	27–92	42–282
Passing yards	220	145
Passing: comp–att–int	24–45–0	11–20–0
Turnovers		
Time of possession	30:38	29:22

Team	Category	Player	Statistics
USC	Passing	Kedon Slovis	16/28 131yds, 1 Int
USC	Rushing	Keaontay Ingram	14run 54yds
USC	Receiving	Tahj Washington	9rec 78yds
ASU	Passing	Jayden Daniels	11/20 145yds, 2 Int
ASU	Rushing	Rachaad White	28run 202yds, 3 TD
ASU	Receiving	Bryan Thompson	4rec 68yds

Scoring summary

Quarter	Time	Drive			Team	Scoring information	Score	
Quarter	Time	Plays	Yards	TOP	Team	Scoring information	USC	ASU
1	1:39	12	94	6:02	ASU	Deamonte Trayanum (#1) 14-yard touchdown run, Cristian Zendejas (#8) kick good	0	7
2	11:40	10	54	4:18	USC	38-yard field goal by Parker Lewis (#48)	3	7
2	9:19	6	43	2:41	USC	Jaxson Dart (#2) 9-yard touchdown run, Parker Lewis (#48) kick good	10	7
2	8:08	3	75	1:04	ASU	Rachaad White (#3) 47-yard touchdown run, Cristian Zendejas (#8) kick good	10	14
3	12:47	7	64	2:24	ASU	29-yard field goal by Cristian Zendejas (#8)	10	17
3	10:11	8	47	3:13	USC	45-yard field goal by Parker Lewis (#48)	13	17
3	4:00	9	41	4:29	USC	52-yard field goal by Parker Lewis (#48)	16	17
4	8:55	8	80	3:20	ASU	Rachaad White (#3) 50-yard touchdown run, Cristian Zendejas (#8) kick good	16	24
4	2:03	10	67	5:42	ASU	Rachaad White (#3) 7-yard touchdown run, Cristian Zendejas (#8) kick good	16	31
"TOP" = time of possession. For other American football terms, see Glossary of American football.							16	31

=== UCLA ===
UCLA Bruins vs USC Trojans

Quarter	1	2	3	4	Total
Bruins	7	21	14	20	62
Trojans	10	7	9	7	33

at Los Angeles Memorial Coliseum, Los Angeles, CA

- Date: November 20, 2021
- Game time: 1:05 p.m.
- Game weather: 66 °F (19 °C) Sunny, Wind: 4 mph North
- Game attendance: 68,152
- Referee: Francisco Villar
- TV announcers (FOX): Joe Davis (play-by-play), Brock Huard (analyst), Bruce Feldman (sideline)

Statistics	UCLA	USC
First downs	30	27
Plays–yards	66–609	86–484
Rushes–yards	44–260	39–159
Passing yards	349	325
Passing: comp–att–int	16–22–2	27–47–2
Turnovers		
Time of possession	26:54	33:06

Team	Category	Player	Statistics
UCLA	Passing	Dorian Thompson-Robinson	16/22 349yds, 4 TD 2 Int
UCLA	Rushing	Zach Charbonnet	28run 167yds, 1 TD
UCLA	Receiving	Kazmeir Allen	3rec 115yds, 2 TD
USC	Passing	Jaxson Dart	27/47 325yds, 1 TD 2 Int
USC	Rushing	Vavae Malepeai	10run 49yds, 3 TD
USC	Receiving	Gary Bryant Jr.	9rec 161yds, 1 TD

Scoring summary

Quarter	Time	Drive			Team	Scoring information	Score	
Quarter	Time	Plays	Yards	TOP	Team	Scoring information	UCLA	USC
1st	11:05	10	63	4:04	USC	29-yard field goal by Alex Stadthaus (#38)	0	3
1st	5:17	8	14	2:36	UCLA	Kazmeir Allen (#19) 45-yard touchdown reception from Dorian Thompson-Robinson (#1), Nicholas Barr Mira (#2) kick good	7	3
1st	0:50	10	63	4:22	USC	Vavae Malepeai (#6) 7-yard touchdown run, Alex Stadthaus (#38) kick good	7	10
2nd	10:10	6	58	2:00	UCLA	Kyle Philips (#2) 23-yard touchdown reception from Dorian Thompson-Robinson (#1), Nicholas Barr Mira (#2) kick good	14	10
2nd	7:14	2	60	0:54	UCLA	Kazmeir Allen (#19) 58-yard touchdown reception from Dorian Thompson-Robinson (#1), Nicholas Barr Mira (#2) kick good	21	10
2nd	2:58	5	54	1:30	UCLA	Dorian Thompson-Robinson (#1) 4-yard touchdown run, Nicholas Barr Mira (#2) kick good	28	10
2nd	0:38	8	67	1:50	USC	Vavae Malepeai (#6) 3-yard touchdown run, Alex Stadthaus (#38) kick good	28	17
3rd	12:27	8	78	3:24	UCLA	Kyle Phillips (#2) 11-yard touchdown reception from Dorian Thompson-Robinson (#1), Nicholas Barr Mira (#2) kick good	35	17
3rd	5:43	16	65	6:34	USC	23-yard field goal by Alex Stadthaus (#38)	35	20
3rd	2:32	2	72	0:23	USC	Gary Bryant Jr. (#1) 44-yard touchdown reception from Jaxson Dart (#2), 2-point run no good	35	26
3rd	2:09	1	100	0:00	UCLA	Kazmeir Allen (#19) 100-yard touchdown run, Nicholas Barr Mira (#2) kick good	42	26
4th	10:48	11	98	6:07	UCLA	Zach Charbonnet (#24) 4-yard touchdown run, 2-point pass incomplete	48	26
4th	7:09	9	75	3:24	USC	Vavae Malepeai (#6) 1-yard touchdown run, Alex Stadthaus (#38) kick good	48	33
4th	4:38	5	25	3:01	UCLA	Dorian Thompson-Robinson (#1) 15-yard touchdown run, Nicholas Barr Mira (#2) kick good	55	33
4th	2:05	3	50	1:48	UCLA	Ethan Fernea (#36) 42-yard touchdown run, Nicholas Barr Mira (#2) kick good	62	33
"TOP" = time of possession. For other American football terms, see Glossary of American football.							62	33

=== No. 13 BYU ===
BYU Cougars vs USC Trojans

Quarter	1	2	3	4	Total
No. 13 Cougars	7	14	7	7	35
Trojans	3	10	10	8	31

at Los Angeles Memorial Coliseum, Los Angeles, CA

- Date: November 27, 2021
- Game time: TBD
- Game weather: -
- Game attendance: 55,926
- Referee: Mark Duddy
- TV announcers (ESPN): Dave Flemming, Rod Gilmore, Stormy Buonantony

Statistics	BYU	USC
First downs	27	27
Plays–yards	74–465	80–458
Rushes–yards	42–189	44–210
Passing yards	276	248
Passing: comp–att–int	20–32–2	23–36–0
Turnovers		
Time of possession	31:09	28:51

Team	Category	Player	Statistics
BYU	Passing	Jaren Hall	20/32 276yds, 2 TD 2 Int
BYU	Rushing	Tyler Allgeier	21run 111yds, 2 TD
BYU	Receiving	Keanu Hill	4rec 72yds, 1 TD
USC	Passing	Jaxson Dart	23/35 248yds, 1 TD
USC	Rushing	Vavae Malepeai	20run 99yds, 1 TD
USC	Receiving	Gary Bryant Jr.	5rec 56yds, 1 TD

Scoring summary

Quarter	Time	Drive			Team	Scoring information	Score	
Quarter	Time	Plays	Yards	TOP	Team	Scoring information	BYU	USC
1st	12:02	8	25	3:40	USC	26-yard field goal by Parker Lewis (#48)	0	3
1st	8:07	8	70	3:56	BYU	Puka Nacua (#12) 28-yard touchdown reception from Jaren Hall (#3), Jake Oldroyd (#39) kick good	7	3
2nd	11:38	15	94	6:46	BYU	Tyler Allgeier (#25) 9-yard touchdown run, Jake Oldroyd (#39) kick good	14	3
2nd	8:33	9	72	3:30	USC	Jaxson Dart (#2) 6-yard touchdown run, Parker Lewis (#48) kick good	14	10
2nd	5:56	6	68	2:19	BYU	Tyler Allgeier (#25) 5-yard touchdown run, Jake Oldroyd (#39) kick good	21	10
2nd	0:03	8	54	1:12	USC	33-yard field goal by Parker Lewis (#48)	21	13
3rd	12:29	6	75	3:23	BYU	Keanu Hill (#1) 41-yard touchdown reception from Jaren Hall (#3), Jake Oldroyd (#39) kick good	28	13
3rd	7:46	14	75	4:25	USC	Vavae Malepeai (#6) 2-yard touchdown run, Parker Lewis (#48) kick good	28	20
3rd	3:56	5	38	1:48	USC	37-yard field goal by Parker Lewis (#48)	28	23
4th	11:45	12	91	5:13	USC	Gary Bryant Jr. (#1) 10-yard touchdown reception from Jaxson Dart (#2), 2-point pass complete	28	31
4th	4:24	6	62	2:30	BYU	Jackson McChesney (#21) 7-yard touchdown run, Jake Oldroyd (#39) kick good	35	31
"TOP" = time of possession. For other American football terms, see Glossary of American football.							35	31

=== At California ===
USC Trojans at California Golden Bears

Quarter	1	2	3	4	Total
Trojans	0	7	0	7	14
Golden Bears	3	14	0	7	24

at California Memorial Stadium, Berkeley, CA

- Date: December 4, 2021
- Game time: 8:00 p.m. PST
- Game weather: 50 °F (10 °C) Mostly Cloudy
- Game attendance: 42,076
- Referee: Matthew Richards
- TV announcers (FS1): Tim Brando, Spencer Tillman

Statistics	USC	CAL
First downs	25	13
Plays–yards	79–409	52–265
Rushes–yards	40–144	31–88
Passing yards	265	177
Passing: comp–att–int	25–39–0	18–21–0
Turnovers		
Time of possession	31:16	28:44

Team	Category	Player	Statistics
USC	Passing	Jaxson Dart	17/26 191yds, 1 TD
USC	Rushing	Vavae Malepeai	18run 107yds
USC	Receiving	Kyle Ford	5rec 71yds, 1 TD
CAL	Passing	Chase Garbers	18/21 177yds
CAL	Rushing	Christopher Brooks	14run 49yds, 2 TD
CAL	Receiving	Trevon Clark	4rec 54yds

Scoring summary

Quarter	Time	Drive			Team	Scoring information	Score	
Quarter	Time	Plays	Yards	TOP	Team	Scoring information	USC	CAL
1st	2:12	14	62	7:54	CAL	22-yard field goal by Dario Longhetto (#30)	0	3
2nd	9:28	6	91	2:40	USC	Kyle Ford (#81) 45-yard touchdown reception from Jaxson Dart (#2), Parker Lewis (#48) kick good	7	3
2nd	4:51	8	79	4:31	CAL	Christopher Brooks (#34) 1-yard touchdown run, Dario Longhetto (#30) kick good	7	10
2nd	3:53	5	30	0:58	CAL	Fumble recovery returned 55 yards for touchdown by Trey Paster (#27), Dario Longhetto (#30) kick good	7	17
4th	5:37	8	65	4:10	CAL	Christopher Brooks (#34) 2-yard touchdown run, Dario Longhetto (#30) kick good	7	24
4th	1:36	14	87	3:55	USC	K.D. Nixon (#21) 16-yard touchdown reception from Miller Moss (#7), Parker Lewis (#48) kick good	14	24
"TOP" = time of possession. For other American football terms, see Glossary of American football.							14	24

== Rankings ==
Ranking movements Legend: ██ Increase in ranking ██ Decrease in ranking — = Not ranked RV = Received votes
	Week															
Poll	Pre	1	2	3	4	5	6	7	8	9	10	11	12	13	14	Final
AP	15	15	14	RV	RV	—										
Coaches	14	14	14	RV	RV	—										
CFP	Not released															Not released

== Statistics ==
USC vs Opponents

	1	2	3	4	Total
USC	57	105	69	113	344
Opponents	66	129	94	92	381

USC vs Pac-12 opponents

	1	2	3	4	Total
USC	44	89	59	75	267
Pac-12 opponents	52	105	73	78	308

=== Offense ===
Passing statistics
#	NAME	POS	RAT	CMP	ATT	YDS	AVG/G	CMP%	TD	INT	LONG
2	Jaxson Dart	QB	132.46	117	189	1353	225.50	61.90%	9	5	45
7	Miller Moss	QB	134.74	8	13	74	37.0	61.54%	1	0	16
9	Kedon Slovis	QB	132.71	193	297	2153	239.22	64.98%	11	8	62
	TOTALS		132.40	318	500	3580	298.33	63.60%	21	13	62

Rushing statistics
#	NAME	POS	ATT	GAIN	AVG	TD	LONG	AVG/G
6	Vavae Malepeai	TB	114	502	4.4	6	35	41.83
22	Darwin Barlow	TB	62	289	4.7	2	16	26.27
25	Brandon Campbell	TB	12	53	4.4	0	13	17.67
28	Keaontay Ingram	TB	156	911	5.8	5	53	91.10
1	Gary Bryant Jr.	WR	1	3	3.0	1	3	0.30
2	Jaxson Dart	QB	22	43	2.0	2	18	7.17
7	Miller Moss	QB	3	-14	-4.7	0	10	-7.0
9	Kedon Slovis	QB	25	-40	-1.6	0	11	-4.44
15	Drake London	WR	1	2	2.0	0	2	0.25
-	Team	-	4	-6	-2.0	0	0	-0.50
	TOTALS		400	1743	4.4	16	53	145.25

Receiving statistics
#	NAME	POS	CTH	YDS	AVG	TD	LONG	AVG/G
1	Gary Bryant Jr.	WR	44	579	13.16	7	62	57.90
8	Michael Trigg	TE	7	109	15.57	1	46	18.17
10	Kyron Hudson	WR	2	4	2.00	0	5	4.00
13	Michael Jackson III	WR	12	116	9.67	0	21	16.57
14	Joseph Manjack IV	WR	7	67	9.57	0	42	6.09
15	Drake London	WR	88	1084	12.32	7	44	135.50
16	Tahj Washington	WR	54	602	11.15	1	29	50.17
18	Jude Wolfe	TE	8	56	7.00	0	18	5.09
19	Michael Epps	TE	10	173	17.30	1	41	14.42
21	K.D. Nixon	WR	3	35	11.67	1	16	3.50
80	John Jackson III	WR	3	16	5.33	0	7	1.60
81	Kyle Ford	WR	19	252	13.26	2	45	31.50
84	Erik Krommenhoek	TE	15	137	9.13	1	20	11.42
87	Lake McRee	TE	7	91	13.00	0	19	22.75
6	Vavae Malepeai	TB	12	65	5.42	0	24	5.42
22	Darwin Barlow	TB	4	22	5.50	0	14	2.00
25	Brandon Campbell	TB	1	16	16.00	0	16	5.33
28	Keaontay Ingram	TB	22	156	7.09	0	32	15.60
	TOTALS		318	3580	11.26	21	62	298.32

=== Defense ===
Defense statistics
#	NAME	POS	SOLO	AST	TOT	TFL-YDS	SACK-YDS	INT	BU	QBH	FR	FF	BLK	SAF	TD
0	Korey Foreman	DL	7	4	11	3.5–8	2.5–7	0	0	1	0	0	0	0	0
47	Stanley Ta’ufo’ou	DL	5	13	18	1.5–1	0	0	0	0	0	0	0	0	0
49	Tuli Tuipulotu	DL	24	24	48	7.5–42	5.5–39	0	2	0	1	2	0	0	1
50	Nick Figueroa	DL	8	8	16	3.5–4	0	0	0	0	0	0	0	0	0
60	Maximus Gibbs	OL/DL	2	0	2	1.0–2	0	0	0	0	0	0	0	0	0
77	Jamar Sekona	DL	4	4	8	0	0	0	0	0	0	0	0	0	0
79	De’jon Benton	DL	1	2	3	0	0	0	0	0	0	0	0	0	0
97	Jacob Lichtenstein	DL	11	17	28	6.0–17	4.0–11	0	0	1	0	0	0	0	0
31	Hunter Echols	BB	11	9	20	1.5–4	0	0	1	0	0	0	0	0	0
41	Juliano Falaniko	BB	2	0	2	0	0	0	0	0	0	0	0	0	0
99	Drake Jackson	BB	23	14	37	8.0-35	5.0–30	1	1	1	1	1	0	0	0
10	Ralen Goforth	LB	31	29	60	1.0–3	0	0	0	0	1	1	0	0	0
17	Micah Croom	LB	2	0	2	0	0	0	0	0	0	1	0	0	0
18	Raymond Scott	LB	12	15	27	1.0-2	0	0	1	1	0	0	0	0	0
26	Kana'i Mauga	LB	56	35	91	5.5–16	1.0–10	1	2	0	0	1	0	0	0
34	Eli’jah Winston	LB	0	1	1	0	0	0	0	0	0	0	0	0	0
35	Kaulana Makaula	LB	2	1	3	0	0	0	0	1	0	0	0	0	0
36	Clyde Moore	LB	1	0	1	0	0	0	0	0	0	0	0	0	0
44	Tuasivi Nomura	LB	2	3	5	0	0	0	0	0	0	0	0	0	0
2	Ceyair Wright	CB	1	1	2	0	0	0	0	0	0	0	0	0	0
6	Isaac Taylor-Stuart	CB	25	14	39	0	0	1	3	0	0	0	0	0	0
8	Chris Steele	CB	19	14	33	2.0–21	1.0–19	2	3	0	0	1	0	0	0
14	Jayden Williams	CB	5	3	8	1.0–1	0	1	1	0	0	0	0	0	0
16	Prophet Brown	CB	5	2	7	0	0	0	0	0	0	0	0	0	0
23	Joshua Jackson Jr.	CB	4	5	9	0	0	1	1	0	0	0	0	0	0
1	Greg Johnson	S	19	13	32	2.5–13	0	1	1	0	0	1	0	0	1
7	Chase Williams	S	31	17	48	2.5–6	1.0–2	0	1	1	0	0	0	0	0
19	Jaylin Smith	S	10	1	11	2.0–9	1.0—6	1	1	0	0	1	0	0	0
21	Isaiah Pola-Mao	S	41	16	57	1.0–1	0	0	1	0	1	0	0	0	0
27	Calen Bullock	S	25	15	40	0	0	2	3	0	0	0	0	0	0
28	Xamarion Gordon	S	0	1	1	0	0	0	0	0	0	0	0	0	0
29	Xavion Alford Jr.	S	27	4	31	0	0	3	3	0	0	0	0	0	0
30	Chris Thompson Jr.	S	6	5	11	1.0–1	0	0	0	0	0	0	0	0	0
	Team		9	6	15	0	0	0	0	0	1	0	0	0	0
	TOTAL		431	296	727	52.0-186	21.0-124	14	25	6	5	9	0	0	2

Key: POS: Position, SOLO: Solo Tackles, AST: Assisted Tackles, TOT: Total Tackles, TFL: Tackles-for-loss, SACK: Quarterback Sacks, INT: Interceptions, BU: Passes Broken Up, PD: Passes Defended, QBH: Quarterback Hits, FR: Fumbles Recovered, FF: Forced Fumbles, BLK: Kicks or Punts Blocked, SAF: Safeties, TD : Touchdown

=== Special teams ===
Kicking statistics
#	NAME	POS	XPM	XPA	XP%	FGM	FGA	FG%	1–19	20–29	30–39	40–49	50+	LNG
38	Alex Stadthaus	PK	10	10	100.00%	6	6	100.00%	0/0	4/4	1/1	1/1	0/0	40
48	Parker Lewis	PK	23	24	95.83%	17	22	77.27%	0/0	5/5	7/8	4/6	1/3	52
	TOTALS		33	34	97.05%	23	28	82.14%	0/0	9/9	8/9	5/7	1/3	52

Kickoff statistics
#	NAME	POS	KICKS	YDS	AVG	TB	OB
38	Alex Stadthaus	PK	30	1916	63.9	18	0
48	Parker Lewis	PK	34	2164	63.6	27	2
	TOTALS		64	4080	63.8	45	2

Punting statistics
#	NAME	POS	PUNTS	YDS	AVG	LONG	TB	I–20	50+	BLK
24	Ben Griffiths	P	44	1978	44.95	71	5	17	11	0
	TOTALS		44	1978	44.95	71	5	17	11	0

Kick return statistics
#	NAME	POS	RTNS	YDS	AVG	TD	LNG
1	Gary Bryant Jr.	WR	16	413	25.81	0	62
16	Tahj Washington	WR	7	121	17.29	0	24
21	K.D. Nixon	WR	3	55	18.33	0	21
23	Keenan Christon	TB	1	17	17.0	0	17
27	Quincy Jountti	TB	1	11	11.0	0	11
	TOTALS		28	617	22.04	0	62

Punt return statistics
#	NAME	POS	RTNS	YDS	AVG	TD	LONG
1	Gary Bryant Jr.	WR	11	50	4.55	0	21
13	Michael Jackson III	WR	2	5	2.5	0	5
21	K.D. Nixon	WR	3	21	7.0	0	15
	TOTALS		16	76	4.75	0	21

== After the Season ==
=== Awards and honors ===
Weekly awards
Player	Position	Date	Ref.

==== Conference ====
Conference awards
Player	Position	Award	Ref.

==== National ====
Individual Awards
Player	Position	Award	Result
Damon Johnson	Long snapper	Mannelly Award	Finalist

==== All-Americans ====
All-American
Player	AP	AFCA	FWAA	TSN	WCFF	Designation
The NCAA recognizes a selection to all five of the AP, AFCA, FWAA, TSN and WCFF first teams for unanimous selections and three of five for consensus selections. HM = Honorable mention. Source:

All-Pac-12
Player	Position	1st/2nd team
HM = Honorable mention. Source:

All-Pac-12 Academic
Player	Position	Class	Major	Ref.
HM = Honorable mention. Source:

=== NFL draft ===
The NFL draft will be held at Allegiant Stadium in Paradise, Nevada on April 28–30, 2022.

Trojans who attended the 2022 NFL Draft:

Round	Pick	Player	Position	NFL team
Drake London	Wide receiver	1	8	Atlanta Falcons
Drake Jackson	Outside linebacker	2	61	San Francisco 49ers
Keaontay Ingram	Tailback	6	201	Arizona Cardinals
Erik Krommenhoek	Tight end	UDFA	-	Los Angeles Chargers
Jalen McKenzie	Offensive tackle	UDFA	-	Tennessee Titans
Kana'i Mauga	Linebacker	UDFA	-	Denver Broncos
Isaiah Pola-Mao	Safety	UDFA	-	Las Vegas Raiders
Chris Steele	Cornerback	UDFA	-	Pittsburgh Steelers
Isaac Taylor-Stuart	Cornerback	UDFA	-	Dallas Cowboys
Liam Jimmons	Offensive guard	Rookie camp	-	Baltimore Ravens; Buffalo Bills
Ben Griffiths	Punter	-	-	-
Greg Johnson	Safety	-	-	-
Vavae Malepeai	Tailback	-	-	-
KD Nixon	Wide receiver	-	-	-

=== CFL global draft ===
The 2022 CFL global draft will be held in Toronto on May 3, 2022.

Trojans who attended the 2022 CFL global draft:

Round	Pick	Player	Position	CFL Team
Ben Griffiths	Punter	1	9	Edmonton Elks
Samuel Oram-Jones	Tailback	-	-	-

==== NFL Draft combine ====
Five members of the 2021 team were invited to participate in drills at the 2022 NFL Scouting Combine.

2022 NFL combine participants
Name	POS	HT	WT	Arms	Hands	40	Bench press	Vert jump	Broad jump	3-cone drill	20-yd shuttle
Keaontay Ingram	TB	6’0	221	31 1/2“	9“	4.53	DNP	34.50“	122	DNP	DNP
Drake Jackson	OLB	6’3	254	34“	10 1/8“	DNP	DNP	36.5“	127	DNP	DNP
Drake London	WR	6’4“	219	33“	9 3/8“	DNP	DNP	DNP	DNP	DNP	DNP
Chris Steele	CB	6’0“	187	31 1/8“	8 3/4“	4.48	DNP	37.5“	126	DNP	DNP
Isaac Taylor-Stuart	CB	6’1 1/2“	201	31 1/2“	9“	4.42	DNP	DNP	123	DNP	DNP

† Top performer

DNP = Did not participate

==== NFL Pro Day ====
Sixteen members of the 2021 team were invited to participate in drills at the NFL Pro Day 2022.

2022 NFL Pro Day Participants
Name	POS	HT	WT	Arms	Hands	40	Bench press	Vert jump	Broad jump	3-cone drill	20-yd shuttle (Pro Agility)
Ben Griffiths	P	6’6	240	32 5/8	9 7/8	4.96	DNP	30”	9’6	DNP	DNP
Kohl Hollinquest	TE	6’2	245	32	9 1/8	5.21	DNP	26.5”	9’3	7.76	4.59
Keaontay Ingram	TB	5’11	220	31 3/8	8 7/8	DNP	23	33”	DNP	7.19	4.44
Drake Jackson	OLB	6’3	273	10 1/4	34 1/4	DNP	DNP	DNP	DNP	7.09	4.28
Liam Jimmons	OG	6’5	293	32	10	5.25	17	23”	8’3	7.90	4.88
Greg Johnson	S	5’10	194	31 7/8	10	4.66	DNP	29”5	9’9	7.15	4.34
Erik Krommenhoek	TE	6’5	245	31 5/8	9	4.84	23	26”5	9’8	7.00	4.50
Drake London	WR	April 18									
Vavae Malepeai	TB	5’10	212	30 3/4	9 3/8	April 18	April 18	27”5	9’2	April 18	April 18
Kana'i Mauga	LB	6’0	245	32 1/8	9 1/2	4.65	21	32”	9’7	7.27	4.40
Jalen McKenzie	OT	6’4	310	34 1/4	10 5/8	5.32	22	24”5	8’5	7.81	4.80
KD Nixon	WR	5’6	190	28 7/8	8 7/8	4.59	15	29”5	9’3	7.14	4.28
Samuel Oram-Jones	TB	5’7	201	28 3/4	9	4.87	21	DNP	DNP	7.46	4.60
Isaiah Pola-Mao	S	6’3	212	32 3/8	8 1/2	4.51	DNP	31”	10’6	6.87	4.34
Chris Steele	CB	6’0	195	30 3/4	8 7/8	DNP	17	DNP	DNP	7.31	4.54
Isaac Taylor-Stuart	CB	6’1	200	31 7/8	9	4.43	15	36”5	10’3	6.81	4.17

† Top performer

DNP = Did not participate

== Notes ==
- August 19, 2020 – USC DT Jay Tufele declares for 2021 NFL Draft.
- November 30, 2020 – Kyron Ware-Hudson flips from Oregon to USC football recruiting class for 2021.
- December 1, 2020 – USC football kicker Chase McGrath enters transfer portal.
- December 3, 2020 – Top USC football commit Jake Garcia decommits from the Trojans.
- December 7, 2020 – USC football loses linebacker Palaie Gaoteote to transfer portal.
- December 11, 2020 – USC football adds Alabama DT Ishmael Sopsher via transfer.
- December 16, 2020 – USC Football Announces Early Signing Period 2021 Class.
- December 19, 2020 – USC Football Opts Out Of Playing In A Bowl.
- December 25, 2020 – USC football adds Xavion Alford as transfer from Texas.
- December 28, 2020 – USC football's Alijah Vera-Tucker declares for NFL Draft.
- December 28, 2020 – Markese Stepp enters transfer portal intending to leave USC football.
- December 30, 2020 – Talanoa Hufanga declares for NFL Draft after All-American season for USC football.
- December 31, 2020 – USC Cornerbacks Coach Donte Williams Adds Associate head coach Title.
- January 1, 2021 – USC defensive lineman Marlon Tuipulotu declares for NFL Draft.
- January 2, 2021 – USC receiver Amon-Ra St. Brown enters the 2021 NFL Draft.
- January 2, 2021 – Ceyair Wright commits to USC football recruiting class for 2021.
- January 2, 2021 – Korey Foreman, Nation's No. 1 Overall Recruit, Signs With USC Football.
- January 3, 2021 – Tim Drevno, Aaron Ausmus Will Not Return To USC Football Coaching Staff.
- January 4, 2021 – USC football recruiting rolls into 2022 with Fabian Ross commitment.
- January 4, 2021 – USC wide receiver Tyler Vaughns declares for NFL Draft.
- January 16, 2021 – Robert Stiner Named Director of Football Sports Performance At USC.
