= Calen Bullock =

American football player (born 2003)

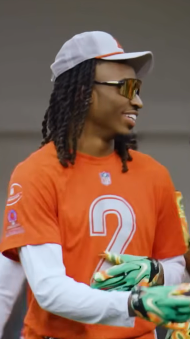
- Bullock at the 2026 Pro Bowl Games

No. 2 – Houston Texans
- Position: Safety
- Roster status: Active

Personal information
- Born: April 30, 2003 (age 23); Pasadena, California, U.S.
- Listed height: 6 ft 3 in (1.91 m)
- Listed weight: 190 lb (86 kg)

Career information
- High school: John Muir (Pasadena)
- College: USC (2021–2023)
- NFL draft: 2024: 3rd round, 78th overall pick

Career history
- Houston Texans (2024–present)

Awards and highlights
- Pro Bowl (2025); PFWA All-Rookie Team (2024); First-team All-Pac-12 (2023); Second-team All-Pac-12 (2022)

Career NFL statistics as of 2025
- Total tackles: 118
- Forced fumbles: 1
- Fumble recoveries: 1
- Pass deflections: 21
- Interceptions: 9
- Stats at Pro Football Reference

Calen Bullock Jr. (born April 30, 2003) is an American professional football safety for the Houston Texans of the National Football League (NFL). He played college football for the USC Trojans.

== Early life ==
Bullock was born on April 30, 2003, in Pasadena, California. He attended and played high school football for John Muir High School in Pasadena, playing defensive back and wide receiver. He committed to USC to play college football.

== College career ==
Bullock entered his true freshman season at USC in 2021 as a starter for the opening game due to starter Isaiah Pola-Mao testing positive for COVID-19. Overall he started six of 12 games recording 39 tackles and two interceptions. Bullock was named first-team All-Pac-12 in 2023 after recorded 42 tackles, seven pass deflections, and two interceptions. He declared for the 2024 NFL draft following the season.

== Professional career ==
=== Pre-draft ===
NFL draft analyst Lance Zierlein projected Bullock would be selected in the third or fourth round in the 2024 NFL draft. Following the pre-draft process, NFL.com analyst Bucky Brooks ranked Bullock the third-best prospect amongst all safeties in the draft. Pro Football Focus had him ranked as the fourth-best safety prospect (81st overall) available in the draft. NFL analyst Daniel Jeremiah had Bullock ranked as the seventh-best safety prospect (98th overall) in the draft. Scouts Inc. had him listed as the fifth-best safety (104th overall) on their official big board.

Pre-draft measurables
Height	Weight	Arm length	Hand span	Wingspan	40-yard dash	10-yard split	20-yard split	Vertical jump	Broad jump	Bench press
6 ft 2 in (1.88 m)	188 lb (85 kg)	32 1/2 in (0.83 m)	9 in (0.23 m)	6 ft 6 1/8 in (1.98 m)	4.48 s	1.51 s	2.62 s	33.0 in (0.84 m)	10 ft 0 in (3.05 m)	8 reps
All values from NFL Combine/Pro Day

=== 2024 season ===
The Houston Texans selected Bullock in the third round (78th overall) of the 2024 NFL draft. In order to secure their ability to immediately draft Bullock, the Texans traded their third (86th overall) and fourth round (123rd overall) picks in the 2024 NFL draft to the Philadelphia Eagles in return for the third round pick (78th overall) used to draft Bullock.

External videos
- Texans select Calen Bullock 78th overall

On May 17, 2024, the Houston Texans signed Bullock to a four—year, $8.85 million rookie contract that includes an initial signing bonus of $1.07 million. Throughout training camp, Bullock competed against veteran Jimmie Ward for a starting role as a strong safety. Head coach Demeco Ryans named Bullock a backup safety to begin the regular season, behind Jalen Pitre, Jimmie Ward, and Eric Murray.

On September 8, 2024, Bullock made his professional regular season debut in the Texans' season-opener at the Indianapolis Colts and made three tackles, one pass deflection, and had the first interception of his career on a pass attempt by Anthony Richardson as they won 29—27. He was named to the PFWA All-Rookie Team. On September 29, 2024, Bullock earned his first career start in place of Jimmie Ward who was inactive due to a groin injury and recorded five combined tackles (three solo) and had a pass deflection during a 20—24 victory against the Jacksonville Jaguars. In Week 15, he set a season-high with six combined tackles (three solo), made three pass deflections, and had his fifth interception of the season as the Texans defeated the Miami Dolphins 12—20. He completed his rookie campaign with a total of 54 combined tackles (37 solo), 11 pass deflections, and five interceptions in 17 games and 13 starts.

=== 2025 season ===
Bullock entered training camp slated as a starting safety following the departure of Eric Murray and the recovery of Jimmie Ward after undergoing surgery. He opted to change his jersey number from No. 21 to No. 2 after 2 became available following the departure of wide receiver Robert Woods. Head coach Demeco Ryans named Bullock the starting free safety to begin the season, alongside C. J. Gardner-Johnson at strong safety and Jalen Pitre at nickelback.

On November 20, 2025, Bullock made five solo tackles, two pass deflections, and set a career-high with two interceptions off pass attempts thrown by Josh Allen as the Texans defeated the Buffalo Bills 19—23. In Week 16, he set a season-high with nine combined tackles (three solo) during a 23—21 victory against the Las Vegas Raiders. He started all 17 games throughout the season and finished with 64 combined tackles (44 solo), ten pass deflections, and four interceptions.

The Houston Texans finished the 2025 NFL season second in the AFC South with a 12—5 record, earning a playoff berth. On January 12, 2026, Bullock recorded three solo tackles, one pass deflection, and had the first pick-six of his career as the Texans routed the Pittsburgh Steelers 30—6 in the AFC Wild-Card Game. He intercepted a pass attempt by Aaron Rodgers to tight end Pat Freiermuth and returned it 50-yards to score the first touchdown of his career. On January 26, 2026, Bullock was announced to be selected for the 2026 Pro Bowl, as a replacement for Steelers' safety Jalen Ramsey. Pro Football Focus had him finish with an overall grade of 69.3, which ranked 29th amongst 98 safeties in 2025.

== Career statistics ==
=== Regular season ===
Year	Team	Games		Tackles				Interceptions						Fumbles			
Year	Team	GP	GS	Cmb	Solo	Ast	Sck	Int	Yds	Avg	Lng	TD	PD	FF	FR	Yds	TD
2024	HOU	17	13	54	37	17	0.0	5	96	18.6	68	0	11	0	1	0	0
2025	HOU	17	17	64	44	20	0.0	4	40	10.0	29	0	10	1	0	0	0
Career		34	30	118	81	37	0.0	9	136	15.1	68	0	21	1	1	0	0

=== Postseason ===
Year	Team	Games		Tackles				Interceptions						Fumbles			
Year	Team	GP	GS	Cmb	Solo	Ast	Sck	Int	Yds	Avg	Lng	TD	PD	FF	FR	Yds	TD
2024	HOU	2	2	5	2	3	0.0	0	0	0.0	0	0	0	0	0	0	0
2025	HOU	2	2	8	4	4	0.0	1	50	50.0	50	1	1	0	0	0	0
Career		4	4	13	6	7	0.0	1	50	50.0	50	1	1	0	0	0	0
