= Rivals.com =

Sports recruiting website

Rivals
- Website type: Sports recruiting information
- Available in: English
- Owner: On3.com
- Website: www.on3.com/rivals
- Commercial: Yes
- Registration: Depending on individual usage
- Launched: November 4, 1998; 27 years ago
- Current status: Online

Rivals is a service provided by On3.com that focuses on college football, basketball, and softball recruiting in the United States. It releases individual high school athlete rankings each year.

== History ==
The service was founded in 1996 and launched as Rivals.com in November 1998 in Seattle by Jim Heckman, Shannon Terry, William Sornsin, and other investors.

In February 2000, the company raised $35 million from SoftBank Group. In total, the company raised $90 million in venture capital from investors including SoftBank Group, Hummer Winblad Venture Partners, Intel, and Fox Digital Entertainment.

In December 2000, Rivals.com switched to a subscription business model. By March 2001, it had 20,000 paying subscribers.

In January 2000, Rivals acquired AllianceSports, a regional network that primarily covered college sports in the Southeastern United States, founded by Shannon Terry, for $3 million.

At its peak in 2000, Rivals.com employed close to 200 people, operated a network of 700 independent websites, filed for an initial public offering worth $100 million led by Goldman Sachs, and sponsored the Hula Bowl in Hawaii.

In April 2001, the bursting of the dot-com bubble caused the operator of the website, Rival Networks, to cease operations, though it never sought bankruptcy protection. Shannon Terry then bought back the assets for $500,000.

In June 2007, Yahoo acquired Rivals.com for approximately $100 million.

In April 2025, On3.com, led by Shannon Terry, acquired Rivals and Yahoo Sports acquired an ownership stake in On3.

== Rivals Football ==
=== #1 Ranked Football Players ===
Year	Player name	Position	High School
2002	Vince Young	Quarterback	Madison HS (TX)
2003	Ernie Sims	Linebacker	North Florida Christian HS (FL)
2004	Adrian Peterson	Running Back	Palestine HS (TX)
2005	Derrick Williams	Wide Receiver	Eleanor Roosevelt HS (MD)
2006	Percy Harvin	Wide Receiver	Landstown HS (VA)
2007	Jimmy Clausen	Quarterback	Oaks Christian HS (CA)
2008	Terrelle Pryor	Quarterback	Jeannette HS (PA)
2009	Bryce Brown	Running Back	Wichita East HS (KS)
2010	Ronald Powell	Defensive End	Rancho Verde HS (CA)
2011	Jadeveon Clowney	Defensive End	South Pointe HS (SC)
2012	Dorial Green-Beckham	Wide Receiver	Hillcrest HS (MO)
2013	Robert Nkemdiche	Defensive End	Grayson HS (GA)
2014	Da'Shawn Hand	Defensive End	Woodbridge HS (VA)
2015	Byron Cowart	Defensive End	Armwood HS (FL)
2016	Rashan Gary	Defensive Tackle	Paramus Catholic HS (NJ)
2017	Najee Harris	Running Back	Antioch HS (CA)
2018	Trevor Lawrence	Quarterback	Cartersville HS (GA)
2019	Nolan Smith	Defensive End	IMG Academy (FL)
2020	Bryan Bresee	Defensive Tackle	Damascus HS (MD)
2021	Korey Foreman	Defensive End	Centennial HS (CA)
2022	Travis Hunter	Cornerback	Collins Hill HS (GA)
2023	Arch Manning	Quarterback	Isidore Newman HS (LA)
2024	Dylan Raiola	Quarterback	Buford HS (GA)
2025	Keelon Russell	Dual-threat QB	Duncanville HS (TX)
2026	Luke Wafle	Defensive End	Hun School (NJ)

=== Rivals Football Camp Series ===
Beginning in 2012, Rivals hosted "Rivals Camp Series", which features assessment camps and athletic combines for skilled high school athletes in the United States. Notable players to have attended the camp include Lamar Jackson, Joe Burrow, Saquon Barkley, Patrick Mahomes, Puka Nacua, Sauce Gardner and Jayden Daniels.

== Rivals Basketball ==
=== #1 Ranked Basketball Players ===
Year	Player	High School
2003	LeBron James	St. Vincent-St. Mary High School, OH
2004	Dwight Howard	Southwest Atlanta Christian Academy, GA
2005	Tasmin Mitchell	Denham Springs High School, LA
2006	Greg Oden	Lawrence North High School, IN
2007	Michael Beasley	Oak Hill Academy
2008	Brandon Jennings	Oak Hill Academy, VA
2009	Lance Stephenson	Lincoln High School, NY
2010	Josh Selby	Lake Clifton High School, MD
2011	Austin Rivers	Winter Park High School, FL
2012	Shabazz Muhammad	Bishop Gorman High School, NV
2013	Andrew Wiggins	Huntington Prep, WV
2014	Jahlil Okafor	Whitney Young High School, IL
2015	Ben Simmons	Montverde Academy, FL
2016	Josh Jackson	Prolific Prep, CA
2017	Michael Porter Jr.	Nathan Hale High School, WA
2018	R.J. Barrett	Montverde Academy, FL
2019	James Wiseman	Memphis East High School, TN
2020	Cade Cunningham	Montverde Academy, FL
2021	Chet Holmgren	Minnehaha Academy, MN
2022	Dereck Lively II	Westtown School, PA
2023	Isaiah Collier	Wheeler High School, GA
2024	Tre Johnson	Link Year, MO
2025	AJ Dybantsa	Utah Prep Academy, UT
2026	Tyran Stokes	Rainier Beach High School, WA
