= Vavae Malepeai =

American football player (born 1998)

Current position
- Title: Offensive quality control analyst
- Team: Stanford Cardinal
- Conference: ACC

Biographical details
- Born: January 28, 1998 (age 28); Aiea, Hawaii, U.S.
- Education: University of Southern California (2019, 2021)

Playing career
- 2016–2021: USC
- Position: Running back

Coaching career (HC unless noted)
- 2023–present: Stanford (OQCA)

Vavae Malepeai (born January 28, 1998) is an American former football running back. He is currently an offensive quality control analyst at Stanford, a position he has held since 2023. Malepeai played for the USC Trojans.

== Early years ==
Malepeai was born in 1998 in Aiea, Hawaii. He played football at Mililani High School where he became one of the best running backs in Hawaii high school football history. He concluded his high school career with more rushing yards than any other player in state history. He would originally commit to play at Oregon but would switch his commitment to USC.

== College career ==
Malepeai enrolled at the University of Southern California in 2016. He was redshirted as a true freshman after suffering a broken shoulder blade in training camp. Despite having his season shortened due to injury, he led the 2019 USC Trojans football team with 503 rushing yards in eight games. His 2019 season was cut short by a knee injury. Malepeai later revealed that he had injured the knee in before the season began and played hurt, hoping he could fight through it.

In 2020, he again led USC in rushing yardage.

=== Statistics ===
Season	Games		Rushing				Receiving				
Season	GP	GS	Att	Yards	Avg	TD	Rec	Yards	Avg	TD	
2016	USC	Redshirt (redshirt)									
2017	USC	13	0	49	261	5.3	0	3	5	0.4	0
2018	USC	12	1	93	501	5.4	8	15	88	7.3	0
2019	USC	8	7	105	503	4.8	6	15	70	8.8	1
2020	USC	5	3	54	238	4.4	3	16	64	12.8	0
2021	USC	12	4	114	502	4.4	6	12	65	5.4	0
Career		50	15	415	2,005	4.8	23	61	292	4.8	1

== Personal life ==
A native of Hawaii, his three uncles, Silila, Tasi and Pulou Malepeai, all played college football for the Oregon Ducks.

In April 2024, he became engaged to Anna Smith, a former USC women's soccer team starting goalkeeper. They wed in Hawaii in July 2025.
