= Mason Murphy =

American football player (born 2002)

- Murphy in 2023

No. 74 – New Orleans Saints
- Position: Offensive tackle
- Roster status: Active

Personal information
- Born: June 21, 2002 (age 24); Riverside, California, U.S.
- Listed height: 6 ft 5 in (1.96 m)
- Listed weight: 315 lb (143 kg)

Career information
- High school: Martin Luther King (Riverside, California) JSerra Catholic (San Juan Capistrano, California)
- College: USC (2021–2024); Auburn (2025)
- NFL draft: 2026: undrafted

Career history
- Chicago Bears (2026)*; New Orleans Saints (2026–present)
- * Offseason or practice squad member only

Career NFL statistics as of Week 10, 2026
- Games played: 6
- Stats at Pro Football Reference

Mason Murphy (born June 21, 2002) is an American professional football offensive tackle for the New Orleans Saints of the National Football League (NFL). He played college football for the USC Trojans and Auburn Tigers.

== Early life ==
Murphy initially played football for Martin Luther King High School in Riverside, California, before transferring to JSerra Catholic High School prior to his junior year. During his junior year, Murphy committed to play college football at the University of Southern California over offers from Arizona, Arizona State, Colorado and Michigan. The following year, Murphy was named to the Los Angeles Times first-team All-Area team and All-Trinity League team.

== College career ==
Murphy redshirted his freshman year, not appearing in any games for USC amidst undergoing surgery on his left foot, which he fractured mid-season. During his sophomore year, Murphy played in all fourteen games, including starting three towards the end of the season. In 2023, Murphy again appeared in every game for USC, but started intermittently, with five on the season. Murphy was named the starting right tackle for the 2024 season, starting in all twelve games for USC. Following the season, Murphy entered the transfer portal.

Murphy transferred to Auburn, where he would play his final season of college football. He spent most of the 2025 season as Auburn's starting right tackle, but spent the final three games as the starting center in place of the injured Connor Lew.

== Professional career ==
Pre-draft measurables
Height	Weight	Arm length	Hand span	Wingspan	40-yard dash	10-yard split	20-yard split	20-yard shuttle	Three-cone drill	Vertical jump	Broad jump	Bench press
6 ft 5 1/8 in (1.96 m)	315 lb (143 kg)	34 3/8 in (0.87 m)	10 1/8 in (0.26 m)	6 ft 9 1/8 in (2.06 m)	5.32 s	1.87 s	3.08 s	4.82 s	8.02 s	27.0 in (0.69 m)	9 ft 1 in (2.77 m)	22 reps
All values from Pro Day

=== Chicago Bears ===
On May 8, 2026, Murphy signed with the Chicago Bears as an undrafted free agent following the conclusion of the 2026 NFL draft. Murphy was waived by the Chicago Bears as a part of preseason roster cuts on August 30.

=== New Orleans Saints ===
On August 31, 2026, Murphy was claimed off of waivers by the New Orleans Saints and added to the team's active roster.
