= Kana'i Mauga =

American football player (born 2000)

Profile
- Position: Linebacker

Personal information
- Born: January 8, 2000 (age 26); Waianae, Hawaii, U.S.
- Listed height: 6 ft 2 in (1.88 m)
- Listed weight: 245 lb (111 kg)

Career information
- High school: Waianae (HI)
- College: USC (2018–2021)
- NFL draft: 2022: undrafted

Career history
- Denver Broncos (2022)*; Las Vegas Raiders (2022–2024); Los Angeles Chargers (2025)*; Pittsburgh Steelers (2025)*; Orlando Storm (2026)
- * Offseason or practice squad member only

Career NFL statistics as of 2024
- Total tackles: 6
- Stats at Pro Football Reference

Kana'i Mauga (born January 8, 2000) is an American professional football linebacker. He played college football for the USC Trojans and was signed by the Denver Broncos as an undrafted free agent in 2022.

== Early life ==
Mauga was born on January 8, 2000, in Waianae, Hawaii. He attended Waianae High School and after being named third-team all-state as a junior he was the Hawaii Defensive Player of the Year in 2017 while totaling 52.5 tackles and three defensive touchdowns. Ranked a four-star prospect and the best outside linebacker in the state, Mauga committed to play college football for the USC Trojans.

== College career ==
As a true freshman at USC in 2018, Mauga appeared in all 12 games and posted 14 tackles with two pass breakups. He saw his first time as a starter in 2019, posting in his first start 13 tackles, a sack, an interception and a forced fumble. He finished the year with eight starts and compiled 59 tackles, seven TFLs, three sacks and two pass breakups. He tallied 41 tackles, three TFLs, a sack and an interception in the COVID-19-impacted 2020 season. In his final year, Mauga played 12 games and finished with 91 tackles, 5.5 TFLs, a sack and an interception. He declared for the National Football League Draft after the 2021 season, ending his stint at USC with 206 tackles, six pass breakups, five sacks and three interceptions.

== Professional career ==
Pre-draft measurables
| Height | Weight | Arm length | Hand span | Wingspan | 40-yard dash | 10-yard split | 20-yard split | 20-yard shuttle | Three-cone drill | Vertical jump | Broad jump | Bench press |
|---|---|---|---|---|---|---|---|---|---|---|---|---|
| 6 ft 0 3/4 in (1.85 m) | 245 lb (111 kg) | 33 1/4 in (0.84 m) | 9 3/4 in (0.25 m) | 6 ft 5 1/4 in (1.96 m) | 4.67 s | 1.67 s | 2.67 s | 4.40 s | 7.27 s | 32.0 in (0.81 m) | 9 ft 7 in (2.92 m) | 21 reps |
All values from Pro Day

=== Denver Broncos ===
After going unselected in the 2022 NFL draft, Mauga was signed by the Denver Broncos as an undrafted free agent. He was waived on August 30 and subsequently re-signed to the practice squad. He was released from the practice squad on November 1.

=== Las Vegas Raiders ===
On December 13, 2022, Mauga was signed to the practice squad of the Las Vegas Raiders. He was signed to a reserve/future contract by Las Vegas on January 9, 2023. Mauga was released on August 1, but later re-signed on August 12. He was released at the final roster cuts in 2023 and subsequently re-signed to the practice squad. He was signed to the active roster on September 30 and later made his NFL debut in the team's Week 4 game against the Los Angeles Chargers, becoming the third alumni of his high school to ever make it to the NFL. He was placed on injured reserve on October 30, and activated on December 9, but placed back on IR three days later with a knee injury. Mauga finished the 2023 season with five games played and three tackles.

On April 25, 2025, Mauga was waived by the Raiders.

=== Los Angeles Chargers ===
On May 12, 2025, Mauga signed with the Los Angeles Chargers. He was released on August 26, and re-signed to the practice squad on September 9. Mauga was released on October 7.

=== Pittsburgh Steelers ===
On December 3, 2025, Mauga signed with the Pittsburgh Steelers' practice squad. He was released by the Steelers on December 19.

=== Orlando Storm ===
On May 12, 2026 Mauga signed with the Orlando Storm of the United Football League (UFL).
