= Gary Bryant Jr. =

American footballer (born 2001)

No. 2 – Oregon Ducks
- Position: Wide receiver
- Class: Redshirt Sophomore

Personal information
- Born: April 26, 2001 (age 25); Riverside, California, U.S.
- Listed height: 5 ft 11 in (1.80 m)
- Listed weight: 191 lb (87 kg)

Career information
- High school: Centennial (Corona, California)
- College: USC (2020–2022); Oregon (2023–2025)
- Stats at ESPN

Gary Bryant Jr. (born April 26, 2001) is an American college football wide receiver for the Oregon Ducks. He previously played for the USC Trojans.

== Early life ==
Bryant grew up in Riverside, California and attended Centennial High School in Corona, California. As a senior he caught 58 passes 1,134 yards and ten touchdowns. Bryant committed to play college football at USC during the 2020 All-American Bowl.

== College career ==
Bryant caught seven passes for 51 yards and returned eight kickoffs for a team leading 210 yards during his freshman season. He became a starter during his sophomore season. Bryant finished the season with 44 receptions for 579 yards and seven touchdowns and also returned 11 punts for 50 yards and 16 kickoffs for 413 yards.

On May 13, 2023, Bryant announced that he is transferring to the University of Oregon.
