= Ralen Goforth =

American football player (born 2000)

Profile
- Position: Linebacker

Personal information
- Born: November 2, 2000 (age 26); Long Beach, California, U.S.
- Listed height: 6 ft 1 in (1.85 m)
- Listed weight: 230 lb (104 kg)

Career information
- High school: St. John Bosco (Bellflower, California)
- College: USC (2019–2022); Washington (2023)
- NFL draft: 2024: undrafted

Career history
- Green Bay Packers (2024)*; Michigan Panthers (2025)*; DC Defenders (2025); BC Lions (2026)
- * Offseason or practice squad member only
- Stats at Pro Football Reference

Ralen Goforth (born November 2, 2000) is an American professional football linebacker. He played college football for the USC Trojans and for the Washington Huskies.

== Early life ==
Goforth attended high school at St. John Bosco. Coming out of high school, Goforth was rated as a four star recruit, where he decided to commit to play college football for the USC Trojans.

== College career ==
=== USC ===
In Goforth's first two seasons in 2019 and 2020, he tallied 44 tackles with three being for a loss, and two pass deflections. In the 2021 season, Goforth notched 62 tackles with one being for a loss, a fumble recovery, and a forced fumble. In the 2022 season opening victory over Rice, Goforth intercepted a pass which he returned 31 yards for a touchdown. During the 2022 season, Goforth totaled 43 tackles, a fumble recovery, an interception, and a touchdown. After the conclusion of the 2022 season, Goforth decided to enter his name into the NCAA transfer portal.

=== Washington ===
Goforth decided to transfer to play for the Washington Huskies. In Goforth's lone season with the Huskies in 2023, he totaled 37 tackles with four being for a loss, two pass deflections, and a fumble recovery.

== Professional career ==
Pre-draft measurables
Height	Weight	Arm length	Hand span	Wingspan	40-yard dash	10-yard split	20-yard split	20-yard shuttle	Three-cone drill	Vertical jump	Broad jump	Bench press
6 ft 1 1/4 in (1.86 m)	227 lb (103 kg)	32 3/8 in (0.82 m)	9 1/2 in (0.24 m)	6 ft 6 1/8 in (1.98 m)	4.66 s	1.63 s	2.69 s	4.21 s	7.07 s	33.5 in (0.85 m)	9 ft 8 in (2.95 m)	22 reps
All values from Pro Day

=== Green Bay Packers ===
On April 30, 2024, Goforth signed with the Green Bay Packers as an undrafted free agent. He was waived/injured on August 27, 2024, but returned to the Packers injured reserve list. On November 5, 2024, the Packers released Goforth from IR with an injury settlement.

=== Michigan Panthers ===
On January 13, 2025, Gofroth signed with the Michigan Panthers of the United Football League (UFL). He was released on March 20, 2025.

=== DC Defenders ===
On April 22, 2025, Goforth signed with the DC Defenders of the United Football League (UFL). He was released on May 6.

=== BC Lions ===
On January 2, 2026, Goforth signed with the BC Lions of the Canadian Football League (CFL). On May 31, 2026, Goforth was assigned to the Lions' practice roster to start the 2026 CFL season. On July 24, 2026, Goforth was promoted to the Lions' active roster. On September 2, 2026, Goforth was released by the Lions', per the CFL's transactions page.
