= Kyron Hudson =

American football player (born 2002)

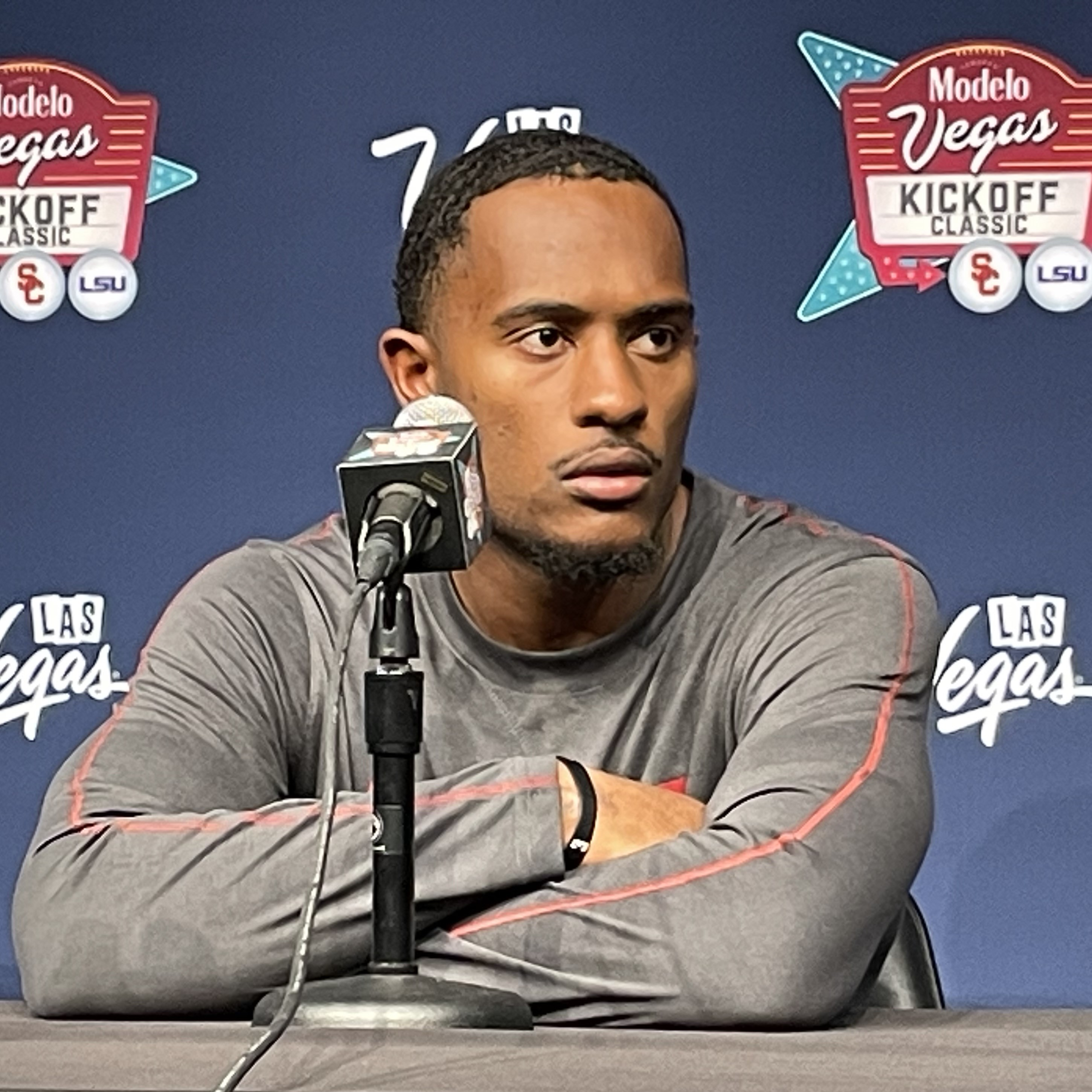
- Hudson with the USC Trojans in 2024

Profile
- Position: Wide receiver

Personal information
- Born: May 16, 2002 (age 24)
- Listed height: 6 ft 1 in (1.85 m)
- Listed weight: 212 lb (96 kg)

Career information
- High school: Mater Dei (Santa Ana, California)
- College: USC (2021–2024); Penn State (2025)
- NFL draft: 2026: undrafted

Career history
- Chicago Bears (2026)*
- * Offseason or practice squad member only

Kyron Hudson (born May 16, 2002) is an American professional football wide receiver. He played college football for the Penn State Nittany Lions and USC Trojans.

== Early life ==
Hudson attended Mater Dei High School located in Santa Ana, California. During his junior year, he caught 59 passes for 853 yards and 13 touchdowns, where coming out of high school, he held offers from schools such as LSU, Penn State, Arizona and Arizona State, where he was rated as a four star recruit. Initially, Hudson committed to play college football for the Oregon Ducks. However, he later flipped his commitment and signed to play for the USC Trojans.

== College career ==
=== USC ===
During his first collegiate season in 2021, Hudson hauled in just two receptions. In the 2022 season, he tallied 15 catches for 152 yards and three touchdowns in 14 games. In week one of the 2024 season, he hauled in five receptions for 83 yards in a victory over LSU. Hudson finished the 2023 season, totaling 17 catches for 189 yards and two touchdowns. During the 2024 season, Hudson recorded 38 receptions for 462 yards and three touchdowns. After the conclusion of the 2024 season, he decided to enter his name into the NCAA transfer portal.

=== Penn State ===
Hudson transferred to play for the Penn State Nittany Lions. Heading into the 2025 season, Hudson is poised to be one the team's top players, as he will compete for a starting spot.

== Professional career ==
Pre-draft measurables
Height	Weight	Arm length	Hand span	Wingspan	40-yard dash	10-yard split	20-yard split	20-yard shuttle	Three-cone drill	Vertical jump	Broad jump	Bench press
6 ft 1 in (1.85 m)	212 lb (96 kg)	31 1/2 in (0.80 m)	9 3/4 in (0.25 m)	6 ft 3 in (1.91 m)	4.64 s	1.63 s	2.63 s	4.50 s	7.47 s	30.5 in (0.77 m)	9 ft 7 in (2.92 m)	15 reps
All values from Pro Day

Hudson signed with the Chicago Bears as an undrafted free agent on May 11, 2026. On August 16, he was waived with an injury settlement.
