= Jaylin Smith =

American football player (born 2003)

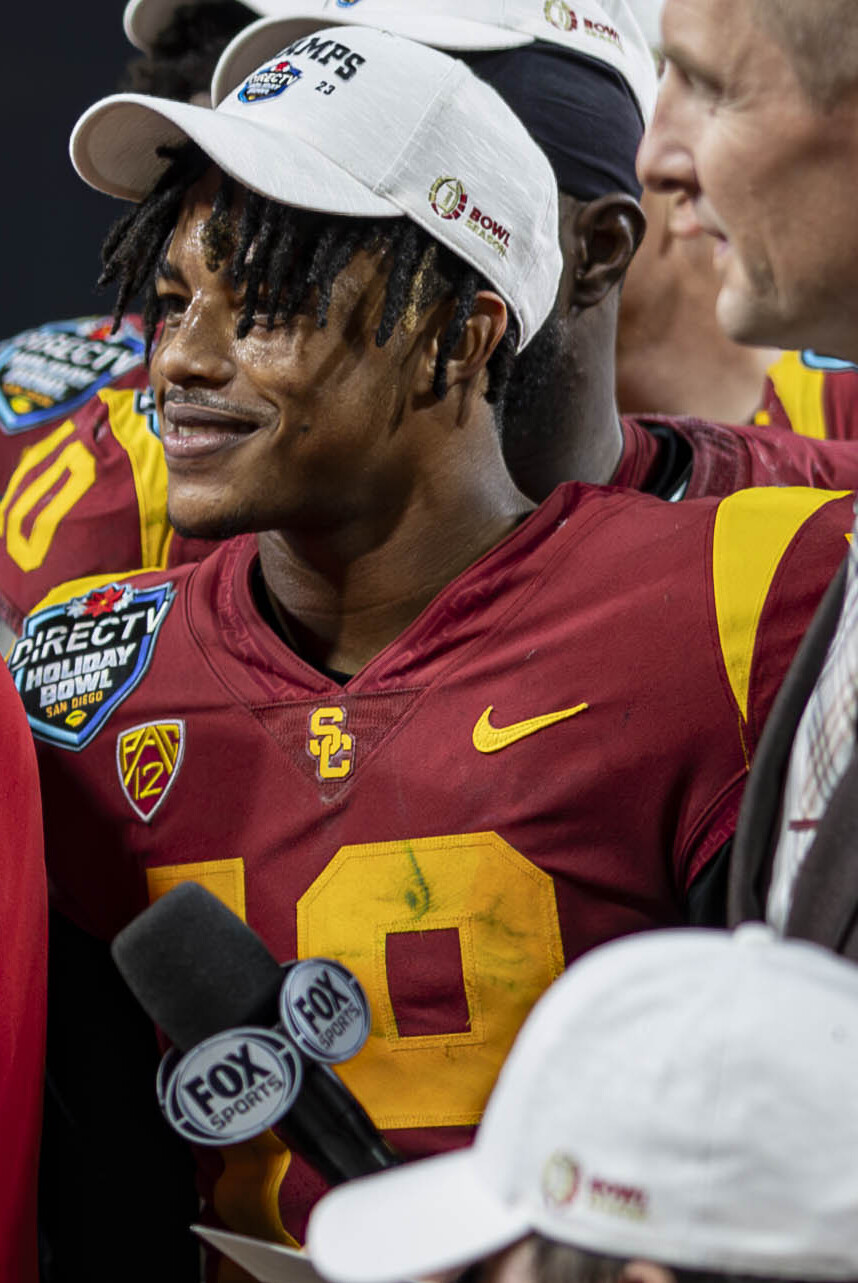
- Smith in 2023

No. 22 – Houston Texans
- Position: Cornerback
- Roster status: Active

Personal information
- Born: November 5, 2003 (age 23); Palmdale, California, U.S.
- Listed height: 5 ft 11 in (1.80 m)
- Listed weight: 190 lb (86 kg)

Career information
- High school: Bishop Alemany (Mission Hills, California)
- College: USC (2021–2024)
- NFL draft: 2025: 3rd round, 97th overall pick

Career history
- Houston Texans (2025–present)

Awards and highlights
- Third-team All-Big Ten (2024)

Career NFL statistics as of 2025
- Total tackles: 6
- Stats at Pro Football Reference

Jaylin Smith (born November 5, 2003) is an American professional football cornerback for the Houston Texans of the National Football League (NFL). He played college football for the USC Trojans and was selected by the Texans in the third round of the 2025 NFL draft.

== Early life ==
Smith attended Bishop Alemany High School in Los Angeles, California. Coming out of high school, he was rated as a four-star recruit and held offers from schools such as Alabama, Clemson, Michigan, Oregon, Texas, USC, and Washington. Smith committed to play college football for the USC Trojans.

== College career ==
In his first three collegiate seasons from 2021 through 2023, Smith appeared in 33 games, where he totaled 123 tackles with nine being for a loss, two sacks, four pass deflections, an interception, and two forced fumbles for the Trojans. During the 2023 Holiday Bowl, he was named one of the game's MVPs after notching 12 solo tackles in a win over Louisville. In week six of the 2024 season, Smith notched four tackles with one being for a loss against Minnesota. Smith accepted an invite to play in the 2025 Senior Bowl.

== Professional career ==
Pre-draft measurables
Height	Weight	Arm length	Hand span	Wingspan	40-yard dash	10-yard split	20-yard split	Vertical jump	Broad jump	Bench press
5 ft 10 1/2 in (1.79 m)	187 lb (85 kg)	29 7/8 in (0.76 m)	9 1/4 in (0.23 m)	6 ft 3 1/4 in (1.91 m)	4.45 s	1.60 s	2.64 s	32.5 in (0.83 m)	10 ft 2 in (3.10 m)	15 reps
All values from NFL Combine/Pro Day

Smith was selected in the third round with the 97th pick of the 2025 NFL draft by the Houston Texans. He signed a four-year contract with the team on May 7, 2025. Smith was placed on season-ending injured reserve on November 5, due to a hamstring injury.

== Personal life ==
In 2018, Smith appeared in Snoop Dogg's docu-series, Coach Snoop.

Smith has been in a relationship with Olympic gymnast Sunisa Lee since 2021, resulting in backlash from the Hmong-American community concerning the relationship.
