= Korey Foreman =

American football player (born 2002)

Calgary Stampeders
- Position: Defensive end
- Roster status: Active
- CFL status: American

Personal information
- Born: November 8, 2002 (age 23); Corona, California, U.S.
- Listed height: 6 ft 4 in (1.93 m)
- Listed weight: 270 lb (122 kg)

Career information
- High school: Centennial (Corona, California)
- College: USC (2021–2023); Fresno State (2024–2025)

Career history
- Calgary Stampeders (2026–present)
- Stats at ESPN

Korey Foreman (born November 8, 2002) is an American professional football defensive end for the Calgary Stampeders of the Canadian Football League (CFL). He played college football for the Fresno State Bulldogsand the USC Trojans.

== Early life ==
Foreman attended Centennial High School in Corona, California. As a senior, Foreman was named to the All-American bowl although the game was not held due to the COVID-19 pandemic. A consensus top 5 prospect, USA Today ranked him the #1 recruit in the country for the class of 2021. He originally committed to play college football at Clemson, before de-committing in order to take more college visits, as Clemson head coach Dabo Swinney has a policy that players committed to Clemson cannot take additional visits. On January 2, 2021, he committed to the University of Southern California over Clemson, Georgia, Arizona State and LSU, citing the school's proximity to his hometown, and the NIL opportunities that playing in Los Angeles would provide to him as key factors to his decision. Foreman's father has stated that Foreman held a makeshift raffle in order to decide where to attend college, drawing a ball with USC's logo out of a hat.

== College career ==
=== USC ===
Foreman received limited playing time in what was later described as a "frustrating" freshman season, finishing the year with 11 tackles, 3.5 tackles for loss and 2.5 sacks. In his sophomore season, Foreman once again struggled to see the field, largely due to injuries and inconsistent play. In the Trojans ranked showdown against crosstown rival UCLA, Foreman had the best game of his career, playing the majority of the game and having a game-clinching interception late in the 4th quarter of the Trojans victory. He finished the season with 13 tackles and one tackle for a loss.

On December 19, 2023, Foreman announced that he would be entering the transfer portal.

=== Fresno State ===
On January 11, 2024, Foreman announced that he would transfer to Fresno State.

== Professional career ==
Pre-draft measurables
Height	Weight	Arm length	Hand span	Wingspan	40-yard dash	10-yard split	20-yard split	20-yard shuttle	Three-cone drill	Vertical jump	Broad jump	Bench press
6 ft 3 5/8 in (1.92 m)	270 lb (122 kg)	32 1/2 in (0.83 m)	10 in (0.25 m)	6 ft 8 in (2.03 m)	4.85 s	1.70 s	2.75 s	4.65 s	7.48 s	29.0 in (0.74 m)	9 ft 3 in (2.82 m)	29 reps
All values from Pro Day

On September 24, 2026, Foreman signed a futures contract with the Calgary Stampeders of the Canadian Football League.
