= Isaiah Pola-Mao =

American football player (born 1999)

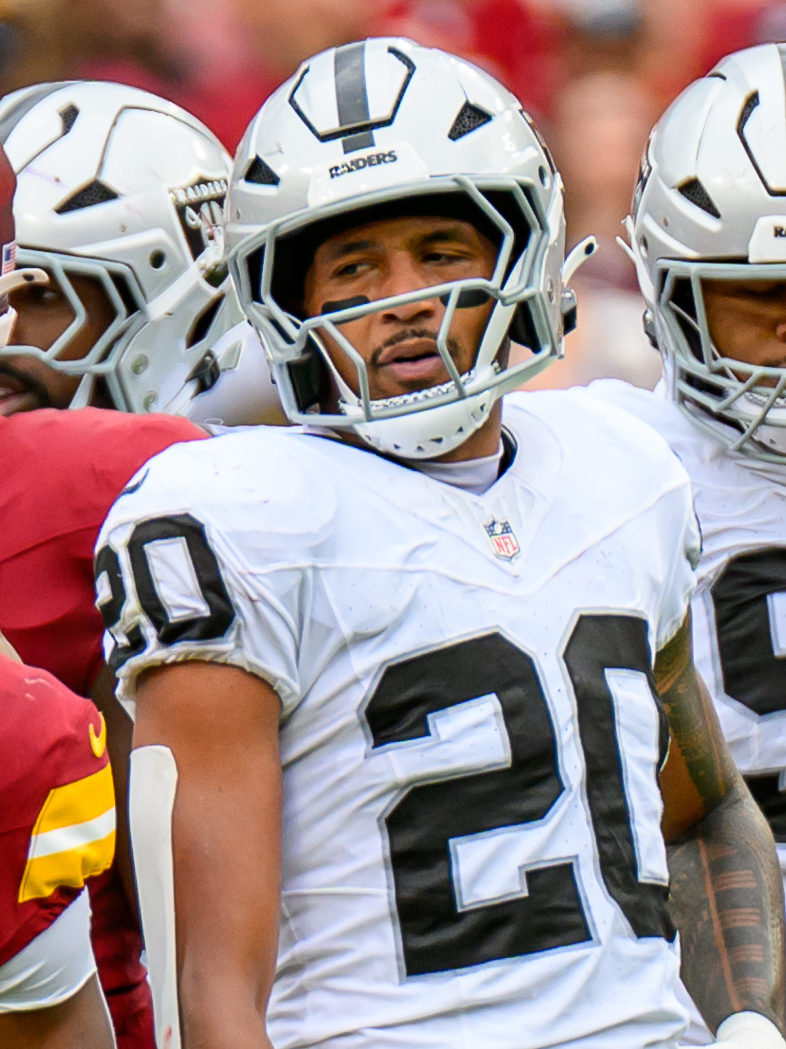
- Pola-Mao with the Las Vegas Raiders in 2025

No. 20 – Las Vegas Raiders
- Position: Safety
- Roster status: Active

Personal information
- Born: June 30, 1999 (age 27); Phoenix, Arizona, U.S.
- Listed height: 6 ft 3 in (1.91 m)
- Listed weight: 204 lb (93 kg)

Career information
- High school: Mountain Pointe (Phoenix)
- College: USC (2017–2021)
- NFL draft: 2022: undrafted

Career history
- Las Vegas Raiders (2022–present)

Career NFL statistics as of Week 7, 2026
- Total tackles: 236
- Sacks: 3.0
- Forced fumbles: 2
- Pass deflections: 10
- Interceptions: 3
- Stats at Pro Football Reference

Isaiah Pola-Mao (born June 30, 1999) is an American professional football safety for the Las Vegas Raiders of the National Football League (NFL). He played college football for the USC Trojans and was signed by the Raiders as an undrafted free agent in 2022.

== Early life and education ==
Pola-Mao was born on June 30, 1999, in Phoenix, Arizona. He attended Mountain Pointe High School, where he played football, basketball, and track. As a sophomore in football, Pola-Mao was named first-team USA Today All-Arizona after recording 35 tackles and seven interceptions, two of which were returned for touchdowns. In his junior year, he again earned first-team All-Arizona honors, posting 98 tackles and four interceptions on defense while making 27 pass receptions on offense. As a senior, Pola-Mao was named a PrepStar All-American, Max Preps first-team All-America, USA Today All-Arizona and the All-East Valley Tribune Defensive Player of the Year after recording 100 tackles and 10 interceptions. He returned three picks for scores and registered 646 receiving yards on 28 catches, scoring nine touchdowns offensively.

In January 2017, Pola-Mao announced his commitment to USC. He redshirted as a freshman after having season-ending shoulder surgery in training camp. As a redshirt-freshman the following year, he started the first two games before re-injuring his shoulder, ending his season. He recorded eight tackles and a forced fumble in the games in which he appeared.

As a sophomore in 2019, Pola-Mao was the starting USC free safety, recording 73 tackles and a team-high four interceptions in 13 games played. He made interceptions in three consecutive games, becoming the first USC player in over 20 years to have this accomplishment. At the end of the year, Pola-Mao was named the USC co-Defensive Perimeter Player of the Year.

As a junior in 2020, Pola-Mao started at free safety and appeared in all six games during a COVID-19-shortened season. He was team captain and made 40 tackles, 2.5 for-loss, as well as a team-leading five passes defended, team-leading three fumbles recovered and one interception. He was named second-team All-Pac-12 Conference by Associated Press (AP) and a third-team choice by Pro Football Focus.

Pola-Mao announced his return for a final season in 2021. He started at free safety during the year, playing in 11 games, nine as a starter, and making 57 tackles, placing third on the team. He also made a pass deflection and recorded a fumble recovered. He was co-team captain during the season. Pola-Mao finished his college career with 178 tackles, five interceptions, eight passes defended, four fumbles recovered and one forced in 32 games played.

== Professional career ==
Pre-draft measurables
Height	Weight	Arm length	Hand span	Wingspan	40-yard dash	10-yard split	20-yard split	20-yard shuttle	Three-cone drill	Vertical jump	Broad jump
6 ft 3 1/2 in (1.92 m)	212 lb (96 kg)	32 1/2 in (0.83 m)	8 1/2 in (0.22 m)	6 ft 4 1/2 in (1.94 m)	4.51 s	1.58 s	2.59 s	4.34 s	6.87 s	31.0 in (0.79 m)	10 ft 6 in (3.20 m)
All values from Pro Day

After going unselected in the 2022 NFL draft, Pola-Mao was signed by the Las Vegas Raiders as an undrafted free agent. He was one of four undrafted rookies to make the Raiders' final roster. He was waived on September 29, after appearing in two games. He was re-signed to the practice squad on October 1. The Raiders promoted him to the active roster on November 9.

In Week 16 of the 2024 season, Pola-Mao recorded nine tackles and two forced fumbles in a 19-14 win over the Jacksonville Jaguars, earning AFC Defensive Player of the Week. In 17 games (14 starts) for the Raiders, he logged 5 pass deflections, 2 forced fumbles, 1.0 sack, and 89 combined tackles.

On February 24, 2025, Pola-Mao re-signed with the Raiders on a two-year, $8.45 million contract.

== NFL career statistics ==
Legend
**Bold**	Career high

Year	Team	Games		Tackles					Interceptions						Fumbles				
Year	Team	GP	GS	Cmb	Solo	Ast	Sck	TFL	Int	Yds	Avg	Lng	TD	PD	FF	Fum	FR	Yds	TD
2022	LV	11	0	20	14	6	**1.0**	2	0	0	0.0	0	0	0	0	0	0	0	0
2023	LV	16	0	20	14	6	**1.0**	1	1	0	0.0	0	0	1	0	0	0	0	0
2024	LV	**17**	14	89	57	32	**1.0**	2	0	0	0.0	0	0	**5**	**2**	0	0	0	0
2025	LV	**17**	**17**	**92**	**58**	**34**	0.0	**4**	**2**	0	0.0	0	0	4	0	0	0	0	0
Career		61	31	221	143	78	3.0	9	3	0	0.0	0	0	10	2	0	0	0	0

== Personal life ==
Pola-Mao's father, Tracey Mao, played for the Arizona Rattlers of the Arena Football League. Isaiah is the nephew of Pro Football Hall of Famer Troy Polamalu.
