= 2025 Washington Huskies football team =

American college football season

2025 Washington Huskies football

LA Bowl champion

LA Bowl, W 38–10 vs. Boise State
- Conference: Big Ten Conference
- Record: 9–4 (5–4 Big Ten)
- Head coach: Jedd Fisch (2nd season)
- Offensive coordinator: Jimmie Dougherty (1st season)
- Offensive scheme: Pro-style
- Defensive coordinator: Ryan Walters (1st season)
- Base defense: Multiple 4–2–5
- Home stadium: Husky Stadium

Uniform

2025 Big Ten Conference football standings
| | Conf. | | | Overall |
| Team | W | | L | W | | L |
|---|---|---|---|---|---|---|
| No. 1 Indiana y$#^ | 9 | – | 0 | 16 | – | 0 |
| No. 5 Ohio State y^ | 9 | – | 0 | 12 | – | 2 |
| No. 4 Oregon ^ | 8 | – | 1 | 13 | – | 2 |
| No. 21 Michigan | 7 | – | 2 | 9 | – | 4 |
| No. 20 USC | 7 | – | 2 | 9 | – | 4 |
| No. 17 Iowa | 6 | – | 3 | 9 | – | 4 |
| Illinois | 5 | – | 4 | 9 | – | 4 |
| Washington | 5 | – | 4 | 9 | – | 4 |
| Minnesota | 5 | – | 4 | 8 | – | 5 |
| Nebraska | 4 | – | 5 | 7 | – | 6 |
| Northwestern | 4 | – | 5 | 7 | – | 6 |
| Penn State | 3 | – | 6 | 7 | – | 6 |
| UCLA | 3 | – | 6 | 3 | – | 9 |
| Rutgers | 2 | – | 7 | 5 | – | 7 |
| Wisconsin | 2 | – | 7 | 4 | – | 8 |
| Maryland | 1 | – | 8 | 4 | – | 8 |
| Michigan State | 1 | – | 8 | 4 | – | 8 |
| Purdue | 0 | – | 9 | 2 | – | 10 |
Championship: Indiana 13, Ohio State 10
# – College Football Playoff champion; ^ – College Football Playoff participant; $ – Conference champion; y – Championship game participant; As of November 14, 2026; Rankings from AP Poll

The 2025 Washington Huskies football team represented the University of Washington as a member of the Big Ten Conference during the 2025 NCAA Division I FBS football season. They were led by second-year head coach Jedd Fisch and played home games on campus at Husky Stadium located in Seattle.

== Preseason ==
=== Transfers ===
2025 Transfers
| Name | Num | Pos. | Height | Weight | Year | Hometown | Transferred from |
| Taariq "Buddah" Al-Uqdah | 3 | LB | 6'0" | 232 | Junior | Los Angeles, CA | Washington State |
| CJ Christian | 4 | S | 6'1" | 196 | Senior | Normal, IL | FIU |
| Omari Evans | 5 | WR | 6'0" | 190 | Senior | Killeen, TX | Penn State |
| Tacario Davis | 8 | CB | 6'4" | 190 | Senior | Long Beach, CA | Arizona |
| Jacob Manu | 9 | LB | 5'11" | 228 | Senior | Santa Ana, CA | Arizona |
| Xe'ree Alexander | 10 | LB | 6'2" | 223 | Junior | Auburn, WA | UCF |
| Ta'ita'i Uiagalelei | 11 | DL | 6'4" | 280 | Senior | Costa Mesa, CA | Arizona |
| Alex McLaughlin | 12 | S | 6'2" | 190 | Junior | Chandler, AZ | Northern Arizona |
| Kai Horton | 15 | QB | 6'4" | 219 | (redshirt) Senior | Carthage, TX | Tulane |
| Ryan Kean | 33 | LS | 6'2" | 210 | Junior | Corona, CA | Utah Tech |
| Ethan Moczulski | 37 | K | 5'11" | 190 | Junior | Spokane, WA | Illinois |
| Trevor Allen | 38 | P | 6'2" | 185 | Junior | Escondido, CA | Adams State |
| Kade Eldridge | 44 | TE | 6'4" | 250 | Junior | Lynden, WA | USC |
| Luke Dunne | 45 | P | 6'5" | 220 | (redshirt) Freshman | Melbourne, Victoria | Oregon |
| Carver Willis | 50 | OT | 6'5" | 291 | Senior | Durango, CO | Kansas State |
| Anterio Thompson | 54 | DL | 6'3" | 293 | Senior | Dubuque, IA | Western Michigan |
| Geirean Hatchett | 56 | IOL | 6'4" | 300 | Senior | Ferndale, WA | Oklahoma |
| Simote Pepa | 77 | DL | 6'3" | 340 | Senior | South Jordan, UT | Utah |
| Name | Num | Pos. | Height | Weight | Year | Hometown | Transferred to |
| Caleb Presley | 2 | CB | 6'0" | 177 | (redshirt) Freshman | Federal Way, WA | San Jose State |
| Jordan Shaw | 3 | CB | 6'1" | 173 | (redshirt) Freshman | Los Angeles, CA | Texas A&M |
| Justin Harrington | 4 | S | 6'3" | 209 | Senior | Raleigh, NC | West Virginia |
| Bryun Parham | 6 | LB | 5'11" | 223 | Senior | Long Beach, CA | UConn |
| Thaddeus Dixon | 9 | CB | 6'1" | 186 | Senior | Los Angeles, CA | North Carolina |
| Lance Holtzclaw | 10 | EDGE | 6'3" | 224 | Sophomore | Dorchester, MA | Utah |
| Tristan Dunn | 12 | S | 6'4" | 191 | Sophomore | Sumner, WA | California |
| Keith Reynolds | 15 | WR | 5'9" | 180 | (redshirt) Freshman | Adelanto, CA | Miami (OH) |
| Curley Reed III | 16 | CB | 6'1" | 191 | (redshirt) Freshman | Lake Charles, LA | Louisiana |
| Teddy Purcell | 17 | QB | 6'1" | 186 | Junior | Menlo Park, CA | TBD |
| Camden Sirmon | 18 | WR | 6'0" | 196 | Junior | Missoula, MT | TBD |
| Jayden Wayne | 18 | EDGE | 6'6" | 262 | Sophomore | Tacoma, WA | California |
| Darren Barkins | 19 | CB | 5'11" | 169 | Junior | Spring Valley, CA | Cal Poly |
| Cameron Davis | 22 | RB | 6'0" | 214 | Senior | Rancho Cucamonga, CA | Minnesota |
| Peyton Waters | 22 | S | 6'1" | 182 | Freshman | Northridge, CA | North Carolina |
| Jason Robinson Jr. | 23 | WR | 5'10" | 151 | Freshman | Long Beach, CA | North Carolina |
| Ryder Bumgarner | 25 | RB | 5'9" | 195 | (redshirt) Freshman | Stanwood, WA | Central Washington |
| Elijah Jackson | 25 | CB | 6'1" | 193 | Junior | Carson, CA | TCU |
| Sam Adams II | 28 | RB | 6'2" | 212 | Junior | Kirkland, WA | Sacramento State |
| Khmori House | 28 | LB | 6'0" | 213 | Freshman | Pasadena, CA | North Carolina |
| Jack McCallister | 38 | P | 6'0" | 205 | Junior | Edmonds, WA | Nebraska |
| Adam Saul | 43 | P | 6'6" | 192 | Junior | Gurnee, IL | Ball State |
| Maurice Heims | 45 | EDGE | 6'5" | 263 | Junior | Hamburg, Germany | Idaho |
| Cameron Warchuck | 47 | LS | 6'0" | 243 | Junior | Norco, CA | TBD |
| Logan Lisherness | 53 | LB | 6'2" | 230 | (redshirt) Freshman | Puyallup, WA | Central Washington |
| Michael Levelle Watkins | 55 | OL | 6'2" | 320 | Freshman | Glendale, AZ | San Diego State |
| Roice Cleeland | 63 | IOL | 6'2" | 297 | (redshirt) Freshman | Vancouver, WA | UC Davis |
| Gaard Memmelaar | 64 | OL | 6'4" | 315 | Junior | Middleton, ID | UCF |
| Kahlee Tafai | 71 | OL | 6'5" | 330 | (redshirt) Freshman | Los Angeles, CA | Minnesota |
| Wilson Schwartz | 80 | TE | 6'3" | 249 | Junior | Westwood, CA | Claremont-Mudd-Scripps |
| Caleb Johnston | 82 | LS | 5'11" | 221 | Sophomore | Ripon, CA | California |
| Tyrese Johnson | 93 | EDGE | 6'4" | 258 | Freshman | Arvada, CO | Northern Colorado |

== Schedule ==
| Date | Time | Opponent | Rank | Site | TV | Result | Attendance |
|---|---|---|---|---|---|---|---|
| August 30 | 8:00 p.m. | Colorado State* | | Husky Stadium; Seattle, WA | BTN | W 38–21 | 67,778 |
| September 6 | 8:00 p.m. | No. 8 (FCS) UC Davis* | | Husky Stadium; Seattle, WA | BTN | W 70–10 | 65,421 |
| September 20 | 4:30 p.m. | at Washington State* | | Martin Stadium; Pullman, WA (Apple Cup) | CBS | W 59–24 | 32,952 |
| September 27 | 12:30 p.m. | No. 1 Ohio State | | Husky Stadium; Seattle, WA | CBS | L 6–24 | 72,485 |
| October 4 | 12:30 p.m. | at Maryland | | SECU Stadium; College Park, MD | BTN | W 24–20 | 46,185 |
| October 10 | 6:00 p.m. | Rutgers^{†} | | Husky Stadium; Seattle, WA | FS1 | W 38–19 | 63,743 |
| October 18 | 9:00 a.m. | at Michigan | | Michigan Stadium; Ann Arbor, MI | FOX | L 7–24 | 110,701 |
| October 25 | 12:30 p.m. | No. 23 Illinois | | Husky Stadium; Seattle, WA | BTN | W 42–25 | 68,630 |
| November 8 | 1:30 p.m. | at Wisconsin | No. 23 | Camp Randall Stadium; Madison, WI | BTN | L 10–13 | 71,217 |
| November 15 | 4:00 p.m. | Purdue | | Husky Stadium; Seattle, WA | FS1 | W 49–13 | 67,229 |
| November 22 | 7:30 p.m. | at UCLA | | Rose Bowl; Pasadena, CA | NBC | W 48–14 | 38,201 |
| November 29 | 12:30 p.m. | No. 6 Oregon | | Husky Stadium; Seattle, WA (rivalry) | CBS | L 14–26 | 72,376 |
| December 13 | 5:00 p.m. | vs. Boise State* | | SoFi Stadium; Inglewood, CA (LA Bowl) | ABC | W 38–10 | 23,269 |
*Non-conference game; ^{†}Homecoming; Rankings from AP Poll (and CFP Rankings, after November 4) - Released prior to game; All times are in Pacific time; Source:

== Rankings ==
Ranking movements Legend: ██ Increase in ranking ██ Decrease in ranking — = Not ranked RV = Received votes
| | Week | | | | | | | | | | | | | | | | |
| Poll | Pre | 1 | 2 | 3 | 4 | 5 | 6 | 7 | 8 | 9 | 10 | 11 | 12 | 13 | 14 | 15 | Final |
|---|---|---|---|---|---|---|---|---|---|---|---|---|---|---|---|---|---|
| AP | — | — | — | — | — | — | RV | RV | — | RV | 24 | — | RV | RV | RV | RV | RV |
| Coaches | RV | RV | RV | RV | RV | RV | RV | RV | RV | RV | RV | RV | RV | RV | RV | RV | RV |
| CFP | Not released | | | | | | | | | | 23 | — | — | — | — | — | Not released |

== Game summaries ==
=== Colorado State ===
Colorado State Rams (0–0) at Washington Huskies (0–0) – Game summary

| Quarter | 1 | 2 | 3 | 4 | Total |
|---|---|---|---|---|---|
| Rams | 7 | 7 | 7 | 0 | 21 |
| Huskies | 7 | 7 | 14 | 10 | 38 |

at Husky Stadium • Seattle, WA

- Date: August 30
- Game time: 8:00 p.m. PDT
- Game weather: Cloudy • Temperature: 67 °F (19 °C) • Wind: N at 6 miles per hour (9.7 km/h)
- Game attendance: 67,778
- Referee: David Siegle
- TV announcers (BTN): Mark Followill (play-by-play), Lincoln Kennedy (analyst), and Alyssa Charlston (sideline reporter)

Game information

First quarter

- WASH – Jonah Coleman 26-yard run (Grady Gross kick), 11:08. Huskies 7–0. Drive: 6 plays, 59 yards, 2:22.
- CSU – Tahj Bullock 2-yard run (Isaiah Hankins kick), 6:47. Tied 7–7. Drive: 9 plays, 75 yards, 4:11.

Second quarter

- WASH – Adam Mohammed 1-yard run (Grady Gross kick), 10:43. Huskies 14–7. Drive: 7 plays, 88 yards, 3:32.
- CSU – Jalen Dupree 15-yard run (Isaiah Hankins kick), 0:10. Tied 14–14. Drive: 9 plays, 66 yards, 1:32.

Third quarter

- WASH – Kade Eldridge 1-yard run (Grady Gross kick), 11:17. Huskies 21–14. Drive: 7 plays, 59 yards, 3:35.
- CSU – Jaxxon Warren 27-yard pass from Brayden Fowler-Nicolosi (Isaiah Hankins kick), 8:01. Tied 21–21. Drive: 7 plays, 65 yards, 3:16.
- WASH – Denzel Boston 12-yard pass from Demond Williams Jr. (Grady Gross kick), 3:01. Huskies 28–21. Drive: 9 plays, 69 yards, 4:51.

Fourth quarter

- WASH – Grady Gross 24-yard field goal, 12:11. Huskies 31–21. Drive: 11 plays, 56 yards, 4:30.
- WASH – Jonah Coleman 3-yard run (Grady Gross kick), 6:57. Huskies 38–21. Drive: 5 plays, 52 yards, 2:38.

| Statistics | CSU | WASH |
|---|---|---|
| First downs | 17 | 26 |
| Plays–yards | 60–265 | 74–513 |
| Rushes–yards | 27–85 | 50–287 |
| Passing yards | 180 | 226 |
| Passing: comp–att–int | 17–33–1 | 18–24–0 |
| Turnovers | 1 | 1 |
| Time of possession | 23:16 | 36:44 |

| Team | Category | Player | Statistics |
|---|---|---|---|
| Colorado State | Passing | Brayden Fowler-Nicolosi | 17/32, 180 yards, TD, INT |
| Colorado State | Rushing | Jalen Dupree | 15 carries, 92 yards, TD |
| Colorado State | Receiving | Jaxxon Warren | 6 receptions, 79 yards, TD |
| Washington | Passing | Demond Williams Jr. | 18/24, 226 yards, TD |
| Washington | Rushing | Jonah Coleman | 24 carries, 177 yards, 2 TD |
| Washington | Receiving | Denzel Boston | 5 receptions, 92 yards, TD |

=== No. 8 (FCS) UC Davis ===
No. 8 (FCS) UC Davis Aggies (1–0) at Washington Huskies (1–0) – Game summary

| Quarter | 1 | 2 | 3 | 4 | Total |
|---|---|---|---|---|---|
| No. 8 (FCS) Aggies | 3 | 7 | 0 | 0 | 10 |
| Huskies | 14 | 28 | 14 | 14 | 70 |

at Husky Stadium • Seattle, WA

- Date: September 6
- Game time: 8:00 p.m. PDT
- Game weather: Cloudy • Temperature: 67 °F (19 °C) • Wind: SW at 6 miles per hour (9.7 km/h)
- Game attendance: 65,421
- Referee: Matt Packowski
- TV announcers (BTN): A.J. Kanell (play-by-play), Marcel Reece (analyst), and Alyssa Charlston (sideline reporter)

Game information

First quarter

- WASH – Jonah Coleman 15-yard run (Grady Gross kick), 12:17. Huskies 7–0. Drive: 3 plays, 60 yards, 1:20.
- WASH – Jonah Coleman 1-yard run (Grady Gross kick), 8:28. Huskies 14–0. Drive: 6 plays, 70 yards, 2:55.
- UCD – Hunter Ridley 45-yard field goal, 5:35. Huskies 14–3. Drive: 8 plays, 47 yards, 2:53.

Second quarter

- WASH – Demond Williams Jr. 8-yard run (Grady Gross kick), 14:51. Huskies 21–3. Drive: 12 plays, 63 yards, 5:39.
- WASH – Jonah Coleman 9-yard run (Grady Gross kick), 10:27. Huskies 28–3. Drive: 11 plays, 62 yards, 4:12.
- UCD – Matteo Perez 1-yard pass from Caden Pinnick (Hunter Ridley kick), 5:28. Huskies 28–10. Drive: 8 plays, 65 yards, 4:59.
- WASH – Jonah Coleman 7-yard run (Grady Gross kick), 2:36. Huskies 35–10. Drive: 6 plays, 65 yards, 2:52.
- WASH – Denzel Boston 78-yard punt return (Grady Gross kick), 1:43. Huskies 42–10.

Third quarter

- WASH – Jonah Coleman 5-yard run (Grady Gross kick), 11:31. Huskies 49–10. Drive: 9 plays, 56 yards, 3:18.
- WASH – Dezmen Roebuck 47-yard pass from Demond Williams Jr. (Grady Gross kick), 4:33. Huskies 56–10. Drive: 7 plays, 90 yards, 2:41.

Fourth quarter

- WASH – Kai Horton 10-yard run (Grady Gross kick), 13:52. Huskies 63–10. Drive: 9 plays, 64 yards, 4:03.
- WASH – Adam Mohammed 4-yard run (Grady Gross kick), 3:02. Huskies 70–10. Drive: 13 plays, 93 yards, 7:52.

| Statistics | UCD | WASH |
|---|---|---|
| First downs | 13 | 34 |
| Plays–yards | 52–218 | 76–628 |
| Rushes–yards | 24–76 | 46–324 |
| Passing yards | 142 | 304 |
| Passing: comp–att–int | 14–28–1 | 19–30–0 |
| Turnovers | 1 | 0 |
| Time of possession | 24:52 | 35:08 |

| Team | Category | Player | Statistics |
|---|---|---|---|
| UC Davis | Passing | Caden Pinnick | 8/16, 50 yards, TD, INT |
| UC Davis | Rushing | Carter Vargas | 5 carries, 43 yards |
| UC Davis | Receiving | Mitchell Dixon | 2 receptions, 44 yards |
| Washington | Passing | Demond Williams Jr. | 16/25, 254 yards, TD |
| Washington | Rushing | Jonah Coleman | 15 carries, 111 yards, 5 TD |
| Washington | Receiving | Dezmen Roebuck | 4 receptions, 77 yards, TD |

=== at Washington State (Apple Cup) ===
Washington Huskies (2–0) at Washington State Cougars (2–1) – Game summary

| Quarter | 1 | 2 | 3 | 4 | Total |
|---|---|---|---|---|---|
| Huskies | 14 | 10 | 7 | 28 | 59 |
| Cougars | 0 | 10 | 14 | 0 | 24 |

at Martin Stadium • Pullman, WA

- Date: September 20
- Game time: 4:30 p.m. PDT
- Game weather: Sunny • Temperature: 84 °F (29 °C) • Wind: SWS at 7 miles per hour (11 km/h)
- Game attendance: 32,952
- Referee: Tim O'Dey
- TV announcers (CBS): Rich Waltz (play-by-play), Logan Ryan (analyst), and Tiffany Blackmon (sideline reporter)

Game information

First quarter

- WAS – Denzel Boston 29-yard pass from Demond Williams Jr. (Grady Gross kick), 10:53. Huskies 7–0. Drive: 9 plays, 75 yards, 4:07.
- WAS – Demond Williams Jr. 23-yard run (Grady Gross kick), 3:47. Huskies 14–0. Drive: 5 plays, 53 yards, 2:18.

Second quarter

- WSU – Beau Baker 12-yard pass from Zevi Eckhaus (Jack Stevens kick), 12:05. Huskies 14–7. Drive: 11 plays, 75 yards, 6:42.
- WAS – Jonah Coleman 12-yard run (Grady Gross kick), 10:02. Huskies 21–7. Drive: 4 plays, 75 yards, 2:03.
- WSU – Jack Stevens 36-yard field goal, 5:21. Huskies 21–10. Drive: 8 plays, 56 yards, 4:41.
- WAS – Grady Gross 51-yard field goal, 00;25. Huskies 24–10. Drive: 11 plays, 42 yards, 4:56.

Third quarter

- WSU – Devin Ellison 8-yard pass from Zevi Eckhaus (Jack Stevens kick), 10:39. Huskies 24–17. Drive: 7 plays, 75 yards, 4:21.
- WAS – Denzel Boston 7-yard pass from Demond Williams Jr. (Grady Gross kick), 8:16. Huskies 31–17. Drive: 5 plays, 35 yards, 2:20.
- WSU – Zevi Eckhaus 1-yard run (Jack Stevens kick), 2:38. Huskies 31–24. Drive: 9 plays, 75 yards, 5:38.

Fourth quarter

- WAS – Denzel Boston 7-yard pass from Demond Williams Jr. (Grady Gross kick), 12:49. Huskies 38–24. Drive: 11 plays, 75 yards, 4:49.
- WAS – Alex McLaughlin 47-yard interception (Grady Gross kick), 11:34. Huskies 45–24.
- WAS – Jonah Coleman 34-yard pass from Demond Williams Jr. (Grady Gross kick), 10:08. Huskies 52–24. Drive: 3 plays, 28 yards, 1:15.
- WAS – Omari Evans 59-yard pass from Demond Williams Jr. (Grady Gross kick), 2:40. Huskies 59–24. Drive: 4 plays, 80 yards, 2:08.

| Statistics | WASH | WSU |
|---|---|---|
| First downs | 23 | 21 |
| Plays–yards | 52–471 | 64–304 |
| Rushes–yards | 33–173 | 28–27 |
| Passing yards | 298 | 277 |
| Passing: comp–att–int | 16–19–0 | 25–36–2 |
| Turnovers | 0 | 3 |
| Time of possession | 24:14 | 35:46 |

| Team | Category | Player | Statistics |
|---|---|---|---|
| Washington | Passing | Demond Williams Jr. | 16/19, 298 yards, 4 TD |
| Washington | Rushing | Demond Williams Jr. | 13 carries, 88 yards, TD |
| Washington | Receiving | Denzel Boston | 6 receptions, 107 yards, 2 TD |
| Washington State | Passing | Zevi Eckhaus | 25/36, 277 yards, 2 TD, 2 INT |
| Washington State | Rushing | Kirby Vorhees | 5 carries, 13 yards |
| Washington State | Receiving | Joshua Meredith | 3 receptions, 70 yards |

=== No. 1 Ohio State ===
No. 1 Ohio State Buckeyes (3–0) at Washington Huskies (3–0) – Game summary

| Quarter | 1 | 2 | 3 | 4 | Total |
|---|---|---|---|---|---|
| No. 1 Buckeyes | 0 | 7 | 7 | 10 | 24 |
| Huskies | 0 | 3 | 3 | 0 | 6 |

at Husky Stadium • Seattle, WA

- Date: September 27
- Game time: 12:30 p.m. PDT
- Game weather: Sunny • Temperature: 69 °F (21 °C) • Wind: W at 5 miles per hour (8.0 km/h)
- Game attendance: 72,485
- Referee: Chris Coyte
- TV announcers (CBS): Brad Nessler (play-by-play), Gary Danielson (analyst), and Jenny Dell (sideline reporter)

Game information

First quarter

- No scoring plays.

Second quarter

- (14:05) WASH – Grady Gross 28-yard field goal (Drive: 10 plays, 69 yards, 5:55; Washington 3–0)
- (1:08) OSU – Jeremiah Smith 18-yard pass from Julian Sayin, Jayden Fielding kick (Drive: 10 plays, 73 yards, 3:31; Ohio State 7–3)

Third quarter

- (7:19) OSU – CJ Donaldson 1-yard run, Jayden Fielding kick (Drive: 14 plays, 75 yards, 7:41; Ohio State 14–3)
- (3:49) WASH – Grady Gross 28-yard field goal (Drive: 8 plays, 65 yards, 3:30; Ohio State 14–6)

Fourth quarter

- (13:19) OSU – Jayden Fielding 34-yard field goal (Drive: 11 plays, 59 yards, 5:30; Ohio State 17–6)
- (4:56) OSU – CJ Donaldson 4-yard pass from Julian Sayin, Jayden Fielding kick (Drive: 8 plays, 44 yards, 3:48; Ohio State 24–6)

| Statistics | OSU | WASH |
|---|---|---|
| First downs | 23 | 15 |
| Plays–yards | 62–357 | 53–234 |
| Rushes–yards | 34–149 | 30–61 |
| Passing yards | 208 | 173 |
| Passing: comp–att–int | 22–28–0 | 18–23–0 |
| Turnovers | 1 | 0 |
| Time of possession | 31:55 | 28:05 |

| Team | Category | Player | Statistics |
|---|---|---|---|
| Ohio State | Passing | Julian Sayin | 22/28, 208 yards, 2 TD |
| Ohio State | Rushing | Bo Jackson | 17 carries, 80 yards |
| Ohio State | Receiving | Jeremiah Smith | 8 receptions, 81 yards, TD |
| Washington | Passing | Demond Williams Jr. | 18/22, 173 yards |
| Washington | Rushing | Jonah Coleman | 13 carries, 70 yards |
| Washington | Receiving | Dezmen Roebuck | 4 receptions, 58 yards |

=== at Maryland ===
Washington Huskies (3–1) at Maryland Terrapins (4–0) – Game summary

| Quarter | 1 | 2 | 3 | 4 | Total |
|---|---|---|---|---|---|
| Huskies | 0 | 0 | 3 | 21 | 24 |
| Terrapins | 10 | 3 | 7 | 0 | 20 |

at SECU Stadium • College Park, MD

- Date: October 4
- Game time: 12:30 p.m. PDT
- Game weather: Sunny • Temperature: 77 °F (25 °C) • Wind: SW at 3 miles per hour (4.8 km/h)
- Game attendance: 46,185
- Referee: Bryan Banks
- TV announcers (BTN): Guy Haberman (play-by-play), Jake Butt (analyst), and Brooke Fletcher (sideline reporter)

Game information

First quarter

- (11:22) MD – Sean O'Haire 26-yard field goal (Drive: 4 plays, 5 yards, 0:54; Maryland 3–0)
- (0:20) MD – Malik Washington 4-yard run, Sean O'Haire kick (Drive: 16 plays, 71 yards, 8:09; Maryland 10–0)

Second quarter

- (4:01) MD – Sean O'Haire 29-yard field goal (Drive: 16 plays, 57 yards, 8:03; Maryland 13–0)

Third quarter

- (11:25) MD – AJ Szymanski 2-yard pass from Malik Washington, Sean O'Haire kick (Drive: 9 plays, 75 yards, 3:35; Maryland 20–0)
- (3:44) WASH – Grady Gross 36-yard field goal (Drive: 16 plays, 55 yards, 7:37; Maryland 20–3)

Fourth quarter

- (14:23) WASH – Denzel Boston 3-yard pass from Demond Williams Jr., Grady Gross kick (Drive: 9 plays, 74 yards, 3:01; Maryland 20–10)
- (11:32) WASH – Dezmen Roebuck 34-yard pass from Demond Williams Jr., Grady Gross kick (Drive: 4 plays, 75 yards, 1:19; Maryland 20–17)
- (3:21) WASH – Jonah Coleman 1-yard run, Grady Gross kick (Drive: 11 plays, 80 yards, 5:17; Washington 24–20)

| Statistics | WASH | MD |
|---|---|---|
| First downs | 28 | 19 |
| Plays–yards | 77–390 | 69–274 |
| Rushes–yards | 36–115 | 20–55 |
| Passing yards | 275 | 219 |
| Passing: comp–att–int | 28–41–1 | 30–49–1 |
| Turnovers | 1 | 1 |
| Time of possession | 30:59 | 29:01 |

| Team | Category | Player | Statistics |
|---|---|---|---|
| Washington | Passing | Demond Williams Jr. | 28/41, 275 yards, 2 TD, INT |
| Washington | Rushing | Jonah Coleman | 18 carries, 57 yards, TD |
| Washington | Receiving | Denzel Boston | 6 receptions, 71 yards, TD |
| Maryland | Passing | Malik Washington | 30/49, 219 yards, TD, INT |
| Maryland | Rushing | DeJuan Williams | 12 carries, 26 yards |
| Maryland | Receiving | Octavian Smith Jr. | 3 receptions, 57 yards |

=== Rutgers ===
Rutgers Scarlet Knights (3–2) at Washington Huskies (4–1) – Game summary

| Quarter | 1 | 2 | 3 | 4 | Total |
|---|---|---|---|---|---|
| Scarlet Knights | 10 | 3 | 6 | 0 | 19 |
| Huskies | 0 | 10 | 21 | 7 | 38 |

at Husky Stadium • Seattle, WA

- Date: October 10
- Game time: 6:00 p.m. PDT
- Game weather: Cloudy • Temperature: 60 °F (16 °C) • Wind: S at 7 miles per hour (11 km/h)
- Game attendance: 63,743
- Referee: Kole Knueppel
- TV announcers (FS1): Noah Reed (play-by-play) and Robert Smith (analyst)

Game information

First quarter

- (13:42) RUTG – KJ Duff 20-yard pass from Athan Kaliakmanis, Jai Patel kick (Drive: 4 plays, 75 yards, 1:18; Rutgers 7–0)
- (5:38) RUTG – Jai Patel 35-yard field goal (Drive: 12 plays, 62 yards, 5:15; Rutgers 10–0)

Second quarter

- (13:21) WASH – Denzel Boston 23-yard pass from Demond Williams Jr., Grady Gross kick (Drive: 3 plays, 50 yards, 1:20; Rutgers 10–7)
- (0:39) RUTG – Jai Patel 37-yard field goal (Drive: 8 plays, 78 yards, 1:21; Rutgers 13–7)
- (0:00) WASH – Grady Gross 36-yard field goal (Drive: 5 plays, 57 yards, 0:39; Rutgers 13–10)

Third quarter

- (13:01) WASH – Jonah Coleman 1-yard run, Grady Gross kick (Drive: 4 plays, 75 yards, 1:54; Washington 17–13)
- (10:06) WASH – Denzel Boston 38-yard pass from Demond Williams Jr., Grady Gross kick (Drive: 3 plays, 60 yards, 1:13; Washington 24–13)
- (9:17) RUTG – Antwan Raymond 48-yard pass from Athan Kaliakmanis (Drive: 2 plays, 75 yards, 0:49; Washington 24–19)
- (2:53) WASH – Demond Williams Jr. 11-yard run, Grady Gross kick (Drive: 12 plays, 75 yards, 6:24; Washington 31–19)

Fourth quarter

- (6:52) WASH – Demond Williams Jr. 7-yard run, Grady Gross kick (Drive: 8 plays, 97 yards, 4:54; Washington 38–19)

| Statistics | RUTG | WASH |
|---|---|---|
| First downs | 25 | 26 |
| Plays–yards | 77–493 | 59–579 |
| Rushes–yards | 27–107 | 32–177 |
| Passing yards | 386 | 402 |
| Passing: comp–att–int | 31–50–1 | 21–27–0 |
| Turnovers | 1 | 1 |
| Time of possession | 30:12 | 29:48 |

| Team | Category | Player | Statistics |
|---|---|---|---|
| Rutgers | Passing | Athan Kaliakmanis | 31/50, 386 yards, 2 TD, INT |
| Rutgers | Rushing | Antwan Raymond | 15 carries, 89 yards |
| Rutgers | Receiving | Ian Strong | 7 receptions, 124 yards |
| Washington | Passing | Demond Williams Jr. | 21/27, 402 yards, 2 TD |
| Washington | Rushing | Demond Williams Jr. | 13 carries, 136 yards, 2 TD |
| Washington | Receiving | Dezmen Roebuck | 4 receptions, 108 yards |

=== at Michigan ===
Washington Huskies (5–1) at Michigan Wolverines (4–2) – Game summary

| Quarter | 1 | 2 | 3 | 4 | Total |
|---|---|---|---|---|---|
| Huskies | 0 | 7 | 0 | 0 | 7 |
| Wolverines | 7 | 0 | 7 | 10 | 24 |

at Michigan Stadium • Ann Arbor, MI

- Date: October 18
- Game time: 9:00 AM PDT
- Game weather: 71 °F (22 °C), sunny, SW 10 miles per hour (16 km/h)
- Game attendance: 110,701
- Referee: Jason Nickleby
- TV announcers (FOX): Gus Johnson (play-by-play), Joel Klatt (analyst), and Jenny Taft (sideline reporter)

Game information

First quarter

- (0:33) MICH - Andrew Marsh 22-yard pass from Bryce Underwood (Dominic Zvada kick) (Drive: 7 plays, 80 yards, 3:47; Michigan 7-0)

Second quarter

- (0:40) WASH - Jonah Coleman 1-yard run (Grady Gross kick) (Drive: 13 plays, 70 yards, 4:31; Tied 7-7)

Third quarter

- (1:20) MICH - Jordan Marshall 14-yard run (Dominic Zvada kick) (Drive: 1 play, 14 yards, 0:06; Michigan 14-7)

Fourth quarter

- (10:05) MICH - Zack Marshall 10-yard pass from Bryce Underwood (Dominic Zvada kick) (Drive: 9 plays, 62 yards, 5:25; Michigan 21-7)
- (4:10) MICH - Dominic Zvada 26-yard field goal (Drive: 7 plays, 9 yards, 4:24; Michigan 24-7)

| Statistics | WASH | MICH |
|---|---|---|
| First downs | 14 | 23 |
| Plays–yards | 55–249 | 68–417 |
| Rushes–yards | 23–40 | 40–187 |
| Passing yards | 209 | 230 |
| Passing: comp–att–int | 20–32–3 | 21–28–0 |
| Turnovers | 3 | 0 |
| Time of possession | 22:31 | 37:29 |

| Team | Category | Player | Statistics |
|---|---|---|---|
| Washington | Passing | Demond Williams Jr. | 20/32, 209 yards, 3 INT |
| Washington | Rushing | Jonah Coleman | 16 carries, 50 yards, TD |
| Washington | Receiving | Denzel Boston | 4 receptions, 71 yards |
| Michigan | Passing | Bryce Underwood | 21/27, 230 yards, 2 TD |
| Michigan | Rushing | Jordan Marshall | 25 carries, 133 yards, TD |
| Michigan | Receiving | Zack Marshall | 5 receptions, 72 yards, TD |

=== No. 23 Illinois ===
No. 23 Illinois Fighting Illini (5–2) at Washington Huskies (5–2) – Game summary

| Quarter | 1 | 2 | 3 | 4 | Total |
|---|---|---|---|---|---|
| No. 23 Fighting Illini | 3 | 14 | 0 | 8 | 25 |
| Huskies | 14 | 7 | 7 | 14 | 42 |

at Husky Stadium • Seattle, WA

- Date: October 25
- Game time: 12:30 PM PDT
- Game weather: Cloudy • Temperature: 53 °F (12 °C) • Wind: SE 15 mph
- Game attendance: 68,630
- Referee: Francisco Villar
- TV announcers (BTN): Jeff Levering (play-by-play), Jake Butt (analyst), and Brooke Fletcher (sideline reporter)

Game information

First quarter

- (9:31) WASH - Dezmen Roebuck 13-yard pass from Demond Williams Jr. (Grady Gross kick) (Drive: 10 plays, 75 yards, 5:23; Washington 7-0)
- (5:05) ILL - David Olano 33-yard field goal (Drive: 10 plays, 39 yards, 4:20; Washington 7-3)
- (0:46) WASH - Dezmen Roebuck 13-yard pass from Demond Williams Jr. (Grady Gross kick) (Drive: 8 plays, 67 yards, 4:12; Washington 14-3)

Second quarter

- (7:26) ILL - Collin Dixon 2-yard pass from Luke Altmyer (David Olano kick) (Drive: 14 plays, 75 yards, 8:20; Washington 14-10)
- (1:55) ILL - Tanner Arkin 5-yard pass from Luke Altmyer (David Olano kick) (Drive: 10 plays, 79 yards, 4:15; Illinois 17-14)
- (0:40) WASH - Jonah Coleman 12-yard pass from Denzel Boston (Grady Gross kick) (Drive: 11 plays, 75 yards, 1:15; Washington 21-17)

Third quarter

- (7:45) WASH - Jonah Coleman 7-yard run (Grady Gross kick) (Drive: 11 plays, 90 yards, 5:37; Washington 28-17)

Fourth quarter

- (14:39) WASH - Denzel Boston 6-yard pass from Demond Williams Jr. (Grady Gross kick) (Drive: 7 plays, 36 yards, 2:50; Washington 35-17)
- (11:07) ILL - Jordan Anderson 1-yard run (Luke Altmyer pass to Cole Rusk for two-point conversion) (Drive: 7 plays, 75 yards, 3:32; Washington 35-25)
- (8:16) WASH - Decker DeGraaf 2-yard pass from Demond Williams Jr. (Grady Gross kick) (Drive: 7 plays, 75 yards, 2:51; Washington 42-25)

| Statistics | ILL | WASH |
|---|---|---|
| First downs | 22 | 27 |
| Plays–yards | 67–337 | 67–449 |
| Rushes–yards | 29-138 | 33-157 |
| Passing yards | 199 | 292 |
| Passing: comp–att–int | 22-34-2 | 27-34-0 |
| Turnovers | 2 | 0 |
| Time of possession | 30:21 | 29:39 |

| Team | Category | Player | Statistics |
|---|---|---|---|
| Illinois | Passing | Luke Altmyer | 22/34. 199 yards, 2 TD, 2 INT |
| Illinois | Rushing | Luke Altmyer | 7 carries, 48 yards |
| Illinois | Receiving | Hank Beatty | 6 receptions, 73 yards |
| Washington | Passing | Demond Williams Jr. | 26/33, 280 yards, 4 TD |
| Washington | Rushing | Jonah Coleman | 14 carries, 75 yards, TD |
| Washington | Receiving | Denzel Boston | 10 receptions, 153 yards, TD |

=== at Wisconsin ===
No. 23 Washington Huskies (6–2) at Wisconsin Badgers (2–6) – Game summary

| Quarter | 1 | 2 | 3 | 4 | Total |
|---|---|---|---|---|---|
| No. 23 Huskies | 0 | 10 | 0 | 0 | 10 |
| Badgers | 0 | 3 | 10 | 0 | 13 |

at Camp Randall Stadium • Madison, WI

- Date: November 8
- Game time: 1:30 p.m. PST
- Game weather: Cloudy, 40 °F (4 °C); Wind: E 7 mph
- Game attendance: 71,217
- Referee: Bryan Banks
- TV announcers (BTN): Rhett Lewis (play-by-play), Yogi Roth (analyst), and Dannie Rogers (sideline reporter)

Game information

First quarter

- No scorign plays.

Second quarter

- (13:39) WIS – Nathanial Vakos 42-yard field goal (Drive: 8 plays, 18 yards, 13:39; Wisconsin 3-0)
- (9:33) WASH – Grady Gross 42-yard field goal (Drive: 11 plays, 52 yards, 4:06; Tied 3-3)
- (7:44) WASH - Denzel Boston 1-yard pass from Demond Williams Jr. (Grady Gross kick) (Drive: 2 plays, 1 yard, 0:34; Washington 10-3)

Third quarter

- (6:26) WIS - Carter Smith 2-yard run (Nathanial Vakos kick) (Drive: 2 plays, 7 yards, 0:40; Tied 10-10)
- (1:58) WIS - Nathanial Vakos 32-yard field goal (Drive: 6 plays, 22 yards, 2:43; Wisconsin 13-10)

Fourth quarter

- No scoring plays.

| Statistics | WASH | WIS |
|---|---|---|
| First downs | 15 | 12 |
| Plays–yards | 68-251 | 65-205 |
| Rushes–yards | 36-117 | 47-157 |
| Passing yards | 134 | 48 |
| Passing: comp–att–int | 20-32-1 | 6-18-0 |
| Turnovers | 2 | 0 |
| Time of possession | 28:38 | 31:22 |

| Team | Category | Player | Statistics |
|---|---|---|---|
| Washington | Passing | Demond Williams Jr. | 20/32, 134 yards, TD, INT |
| Washington | Rushing | Demond Williams Jr. | 19 carries, 61 yards |
| Washington | Receiving | Denzel Boston | 8 receptions, 62 yards, TD |
| Wisconsin | Passing | Sean West | 1/1, 24 yards |
| Wisconsin | Rushing | Gideon Ituka | 19 carries, 73 yards |
| Wisconsin | Receiving | Jackson Acker | 3 receptions, 27 yards |

=== Purdue ===
Purdue Boilermakers (2–8) at Washington Huskies (6–3) – Game summary

| Quarter | 1 | 2 | 3 | 4 | Total |
|---|---|---|---|---|---|
| Boilermakers | 0 | 0 | 3 | 10 | 13 |
| Huskies | 7 | 21 | 14 | 7 | 49 |

at Husky Stadium • Seattle, WA

- Date: November 15
- Game time: 4:00 p.m. PST
- Game weather: Rain • Temperature: 54 °F (12 °C) • Wind: S 6 mph
- Game attendance: 67,229
- Referee: Gregory Blum
- TV announcers (FS1): Dan Hellie (play-by-play) and Spencer Tillman (analyst)

Game information

First quarter

- (3:30) WASH - Adam Mohammed 1-yard run (Grady Gross kick) (Drive: 6 plays, 62 yards, 3:22; Washington 7-0)

Second quarter

- (9:07) WASH - Adam Mohammed 1-yard run (Grady Gross kick) (Drive: 14 plays, 61 yards, 7:09; Washington 14-0)
- (7:05) WASH - Jordan Washington 68-yard run (Grady Gross kick) (Drive: 1 play, 68 yards, 0:10; Washington 21-0)
- (0:55) WASH - Adam Mohammed 5-yard run (Grady Gross kick) (Drive: 8 plays, 90 yards, 2:48; Washington 28-0)

Third quarter

- (11:59) WASH - Audric Harris 61-yard pass from Demond Williams Jr. (Grady Gross kick) (Drive: 4 plays, 87 yards, 1:58; Washington 35-0)
- (7:02) PUR - Spencer Porath 41-yard field goal (Drive: 11 plays, 52 yards, 4:57; Washington 35-3)
- (3:27) WASH - Dezmen Roebuck 2-yard pass from Demond Williams Jr. (Grady Gross kick) (Drive: 8 plays, 75 yards, 3:40; Washington 42-3)

Fourth quarter

- (12:15) PUR - Spencer Porath 53-yard field goal (Drive: 13 plays, 40 yards, 6:07; Washington 42-6)
- (7:15) PUR - EJ Horton Jr. 9-yard pass from Malachi Singleton (Spencer Porath kick) (Drive: 7 plays, 68 yards, 3:32; Washington 42-13)
- (1:54) WASH - Kai Horton 2-yard run (Grady Gross kick) (Drive: 8 plays, 75 yards, 5:17; Washington 49-13)

| Statistics | PUR | WASH |
|---|---|---|
| First downs | 14 | 24 |
| Plays–yards | 66-267 | 60-506 |
| Rushes–yards | 30-100 | 40-212 |
| Passing yards | 167 | 294 |
| Passing: comp–att–int | 17-34-1 | 18-22-0 |
| Turnovers | 1 | 1 |
| Time of possession | 28:52 | 31:08 |

| Team | Category | Player | Statistics |
|---|---|---|---|
| Purdue | Passing | Malachi Singleton | 16/28, 150 yards, TD |
| Purdue | Rushing | EJ Horton Jr. | 1 carry, 31 yards |
| Purdue | Receiving | Nitro Tuggle | 3 receptions, 57 yards |
| Washington | Passing | Demond Williams Jr. | 16/19, 257 yards, 2 TD |
| Washington | Rushing | Jordan Washington | 5 carries, 108 yards, TD |
| Washington | Receiving | Decker DeGraaf | 5 receptions, 91 yards |

=== at UCLA ===
Washington Huskies (7–3) at UCLA Bruins (3–7) – Game summary

| Quarter | 1 | 2 | 3 | 4 | Total |
|---|---|---|---|---|---|
| Huskies | 3 | 17 | 14 | 14 | 48 |
| Bruins | 0 | 0 | 7 | 7 | 14 |

at Rose Bowl • Pasadena, CA

- Date: November 22
- Game time: 7:30 p.m. PDT
- Game weather: Sunny
- Game attendance: 38,201
- Referee: Jason Nickelby
- TV announcers (NBC): Paul Burmeister (play-by-play), Yogi Roth (analyst) and Caroline Pineda (sideline)

Game information

First quarter

- (1:10) WASH - Grady Gross 36-yard field goal (Drive: 4 plays, 2 yards, 0:49; Washington 3-0)

Second quarter

- (10:56) WASH - Demond Williams Jr. 25-yard run (Grady Gross kick) (Drive: 8 plays, 65 yards, 3:52; Washington 10-0)
- (5:46) WASH - Grady Gross 22-yard field goal (Drive: 8 plays, 41 yards, 3:04; Washington 13-0)
- (1:44) WASH - Alex McLaughlin 59-yard fumble return (Grady Gross kick) (Drive: 4 plays, -76 yards, 1:27; Washington 20-0)

Third quarter

- (10:38) WASH - Demond Williams Jr. 11-yard run (Grady Gross kick) (Drive: 6 plays, 55 yards, 2:57; Washington 27-0)
- (5:24) WASH - Dezmen Roebuck 18-yard pass from Demond Williams Jr. (Grady Gross kick) (Drive: 4 plays, 68 yards, 2:57; Washington 34-0)
- (2:53) UCLA - Mikey Matthews 37-yard pass from Luke Duncan (Mateen Bhaghani kick) (Drive: 7 plays, 82 yards, 2:26; Washington 34-7)

Fourth quarter

- (12:53) WASH - Jonah Coleman 1-yard run (Grady Gross kick) (Drive: 11 plays, 75 yards, 5:00; Washington 41-7)
- (11:19) UCLA - Jamir Benjamin 13-yard fumble return (Mateen Bhaghani kick) (Drive: 4 plays, 8 yards, 1:34; Washington 41-14)
- (7:14) WASH - Decker DeGraaf 24-yard pass from Demond Williams Jr. (Grady Gross kick) (Drive: 7 plays, 75 yards, 4:05; Washington 48-14)

| Statistics | WASH | UCLA |
|---|---|---|
| First downs | 25 | 10 |
| Plays–yards | 69–426 | 60–207 |
| Rushes–yards | 39–212 | 22–57 |
| Passing yards | 214 | 150 |
| Passing: comp–att–int | 18–28–1 | 21–37–0 |
| Turnovers | 2 | 3 |
| Time of possession | 34:27 | 25:33 |

| Team | Category | Player | Statistics |
|---|---|---|---|
| Washington | Passing | Demond Williams Jr. | 17/26, 213 yards, 2 TD, INT |
| Washington | Rushing | Adam Mohammed | 21 carries, 108 yards |
| Washington | Receiving | Dezmen Roebuck | 7 receptions, 96 yards, TD |
| UCLA | Passing | Luke Duncan | 5/11, 81 yards, TD |
| UCLA | Rushing | Jalen Berger | 6 carries, 26 yards |
| UCLA | Receiving | Mikey Matthews | 6 receptions, 38 yards, TD |

=== vs Oregon (rivalry) ===
No. 7 Oregon Ducks (10-1) at Washington Huskies (8-3) – Game summary

| Quarter | 1 | 2 | 3 | 4 | Total |
|---|---|---|---|---|---|
| Ducks | 3 | 10 | 6 | 7 | 26 |
| Huskies | 0 | 7 | 0 | 7 | 14 |

at Husky Stadium • Seattle, WA

- Date: November 29
- Game time: 12:30 p.m.
- Game weather: Cloudy
- Game attendance: 72,376
- Referee: Ron Snodgrass
- TV announcers (CBS): Brad Nessler (play-by-play), Gary Danielson (analyst), and Jenny Dell (sideline reporter)

Game information

First quarter

- (11:12) ORE - Atticus Sappington 46-yard field goal (Drive: 7 plays, 43 yards, 1:57; Oregon 3-0)

Second quarter

- (10:54) ORE - Dante Moore 1-yard run (Atticus Sappington kick) (Drive: 14 plays, 80 yards, 6:52; Oregon 10-0)
- (3:18) ORE - Atticus Sappington 32-yard field goal (Drive: 12 plays, 62 yards, 5:53; Oregon 13-0)
- (0:10) WASH - Denzel Boston 3-yard pass from Demond Williams Jr. (Grady Gross kick) (Drive: 12 plays, 75 yards, 3:08; Oregon 13-7)

Third quarter

- (9:07) ORE - Atticus Sappington 37-yard field goal (Drive: 11 plays, 56 yards, 5:53; Oregon 16-7)
- (2:34) ORE - Atticus Sappington 51-yard field goal (Drive: 7 plays, 60 yards, 3:54; Oregon 19-7)

Fourth quarter

- (8:54) WASH - Denzel Boston 13-yard pass from Demond Williams Jr. (Grady Gross kick) (Drive: 13 plays, 69 yards, 5:54; Oregon 19-14)
- (7:55) ORE - Malik Benson 64-yard pass from Dante Moore (Atticus Sappington kick) (Drive: 3 plays, 65 yards, 0:59; Oregon 26-14)

| Statistics | ORE | WASH |
|---|---|---|
| First downs | 17 | 18 |
| Plays–yards | 75–392 | 63–283 |
| Rushes–yards | 42–106 | 33–154 |
| Passing yards | 286 | 129 |
| Passing: comp–att–int | 20–29–0 | 15–30–2 |
| Turnovers | 0 | 2 |
| Time of possession | 34:58 | 25:02 |

| Team | Category | Player | Statistics |
|---|---|---|---|
| Oregon | Passing | Dante Moore | 20/29, 286 yards, TD |
| Oregon | Rushing | Noah Whittington | 17 carries, 47 yards |
| Oregon | Receiving | Malik Benson | 5 receptions, 102 yards, TD |
| Washington | Passing | Demond Williams Jr. | 15/30, 129 yards, 2 TD, 2 INT |
| Washington | Rushing | Adam Mohammed | 14 carries, 105 yards |
| Washington | Receiving | Dezmen Roebuck | 2 receptions, 27 yards |

=== vs Boise State (LA Bowl) ===
2025 Bucked Up LA Bowl Hosted by Gronk
Boise State Broncos (9–4) vs Washington Huskies (8–4) – Game summary

| Quarter | 1 | 2 | 3 | 4 | Total |
|---|---|---|---|---|---|
| Broncos | 3 | 0 | 0 | 7 | 10 |
| Huskies | 3 | 21 | 7 | 7 | 38 |

at SoFi Stadium • Inglewood, CA

- Date: December 13, 2025
- Game time: 5:00 p.m.
- Game weather: Clear • Temperature: 59 °F (15 °C) • Wind: N/A (indoors)
- Game attendance: 23,269
- Referee: Edwin Lee
- TV announcers (ABC/ESPN Radio): ABC: Dave Pasch (play-by-play), Dusty Dvoracek (analyst) and Taylor McGregor (sideline reporter)
  ESPN Radio: Mike Couzens (play-by-play) and Max Browne (analyst)

Game information

First quarter

- (11:35) BOIS - Colton Boomer 52-yard field goal, 11:35. (Drive: 6 plays, 21 yards, 3:16; Broncos 3–0)
- (4:20) WASH - Grady Gross 33-yard field goal, 4:20. (Drive: 15 plays, 60 yards, 7:15; Tied 3–3)

Second quarter

- (9:54) WASH - Denzel Boston 78-yard pass from Demond Williams Jr. (Grady Gross kick), 9:54. (Drive: 2 plays, 82 yards, 0:52; Huskies 10–3)
- (1:56) WASH - Dezmen Roebuck 6-yard pass from Demond Williams Jr. (Grady Gross kick), 1:56. (Drive: 7 plays, 57 yards, 3:03; Huskies 17–3)
- (1:17) WASH - Raiden Vines-Bright 3-yard pass from Demond Williams Jr. (Grady Gross kick), 1:17. (Drive: 3 plays, 35 yards, 0:22; Huskies 24–3)

Third quarter

- (12:05) WASH - Quentin Moore 32-yard pass from Demond Williams Jr. (Grady Gross kick), 12:05. (Drive: 6 plays, 70 yards, 2:47; Huskies 31–3)

Fourth quarter

- (10:46) WASH - Jonah Coleman 6-yard run (Grady Gross kick), 10:46. (Drive: 3 plays, 9 yards, 0:49; Huskies 38–3)
- (1:18) BOIS - Matt Lauter 8-yard pass from Max Cutforth (Colton Boomer kick), 1:18. (Drive: 13 plays, 94 yards, 5:01; Huskies 38–10)

| Statistics | BOIS | WASH |
|---|---|---|
| First downs | 16 | 17 |
| Plays–yards | 72–311 | 61–355 |
| Rushes–yards | 28–58 | 34–127 |
| Passing yards | 253 | 228 |
| Passing: comp–att–int | 22–43–5 | 17–28–0 |
| Turnovers | 5 | 1 |
| Time of possession | 32:06 | 28:04 |

| Team | Category | Player | Statistics |
|---|---|---|---|
| Boise State | Passing | Max Cutforth | 15/27, 302 yards, TD, 3 INT |
| Boise State | Rushing | Dylan Riley | 10 carries, 34 yards |
| Boise State | Receiving | Chris Marshall | 5 receptions, 97 yards |
| Washington | Passing | Demond Williams Jr. | 15/24, 214 yards, 4 TD |
| Washington | Rushing | Jonah Coleman | 12 carries, 96 yards, TD |
| Washington | Receiving | Denzel Boston | 6 receptions, 125 yards, TD |

== Roster ==
2025 Washington Huskies football team roster
Players
Coaches
Offense

| Pos. | # | Name | Class |
|---|---|---|---|
| WR | 0 | Kevin Green Jr. | Jr |
| RB | 1 | Jonah Coleman | Sr |
| QB | 2 | Demond Williams Jr. | So |
| WR | 3 | Rashid Williams (injured) | So |
| RB | 4 | Jordan Washington | Fr |
| WR | 5 | Omari Evans | Sr |
| WR | 7 | Raiden Vines-Bright | Fr |
| WR | 8 | Chris Lawson | Fr |
| QB | 9 | Dash Beierly | Fr |
| QB | 10 | Treston "Kini" McMillan | Fr |
| WR | 11 | Marcus Harris | Fr |
| WR | 12 | Denzel Boston | Jr |
| WR | 13 | Audric Harris | So |
| QB | 15 | Kai Horton | Sr |
| WR | 16 | Justice Williams | Fr |
| RB | 21 | Quaid Carr | Fr |
| RB | 24 | Adam Mohammed | So |
| RB | 25 | Beck Walker | Jr |
| RB | 29 | Julian McMahan | Fr |
| WR | 31 | Luke Luchini | So |
| RB | 32 | Ryken Moon | Fr |
| WR | 35 | Jace Burton | Fr |
| TE | 44 | Kade Eldridge (injured) | So |
| TE | 45 | Austin Simmons | Fr |
| OL | 50 | Carver Willis | Sr |
| OL | 53 | Paki Finau | Fr |
| OL | 54 | Parker Cross | So |
| OL | 56 | Geirean Hatchett | Sr |
| OL | 58 | Zachary Henning | So |
| OL | 65 | Jack Shaffer | Fr |
| OL | 66 | Landen Hatchett | So |
| OL | 67 | Aidan Anderson | So |
| OL | 68 | Soane Faasalo | So |
| OL | 70 | Justin Hylkema | Fr |
| OL | 71 | Davit Boyajyan | Fr |
| OL | 72 | John Mills | Fr |
| OL | 73 | Champ Taulealea | Fr |
| OL | 74 | Drew Azzopardi | Jr |
| OL | 75 | Lowen Colman-Brusa | Fr |
| OL | 76 | Elishah Jackett | So |
| OL | 77 | Maximus McCree | Sr |
| OL | 78 | Jake Flores | Fr |
| WR | 81 | Dezmen Roebuck | Fr |
| WR | 82 | Deji Ajose | Fr |
| WR | 83 | Luke Gayton | Fr |
| TE | 85 | Baron Naone | Fr |
| TE | 86 | Decker DeGraaf | So |
| TE | 88 | Quentin Moore | Sr |
| TE | 89 | Charlie Crowell (injured) | Fr |

Defense

| Pos. | # | Name | Class |
|---|---|---|---|
| CB | 0 | Leroy Bryant | So |
| S | 2 | Rahshawn Clark | Fr |
| LB | 3 | Taariq "Buddah" Al-Uqdah (injured) | Jr |
| S | 4 | CJ Christian (injured) | Sr |
| EDGE | 5 | Zach Durfee | Sr |
| CB | 6 | Dylan Robinson | Fr |
| CB | 7 | Ephesians Prysock | Sr |
| CB | 8 | Tacario Davis | Sr |
| LB | 9 | Jacob Manu | Sr |
| LB | 10 | Xe'ree Alexander | Jr |
| DL | 11 | Ta'ita'i Uiagalelei | Sr |
| S | 12 | Alex McLaughlin | Jr |
| EDGE | 14 | Milton Hopkins Jr. | Sr |
| S | 15 | Rahim Wright II (injured) | Fr |
| CB | 16 | Ramonz Adams Jr. | Fr |
| LB | 17 | Deven Bryant | So |
| S | 18 | Rylon Dillard-Allen | Fr |
| DL | 19 | Caleb Smith | Fr |
| S | 21 | Dyson McCutcheon (injured) | Sr |
| LB | 22 | Jonathan Epperson Jr. | Fr |
| LB | 23 | Zaydrius Rainey-Sale | Fr |
| S | 24 | Makell Esteen | Sr |
| LB | 25 | Donovan Robinson Jr. | Fr |
| CB | 26 | Elias Jackson | Fr |
| S | 27 | Vincent Holmes | So |
| DB | 28 | D'Aryhian Clemons | Fr |
| S | 30 | Kayden Greene | Fr |
| S | 31 | Paul Mencke Jr. | Fr |
| S | 32 | Tristan Warner | Jr |
| DL | 41 | Deshawn Lynch | Sr |
| LB | 44 | Hayden Moore | So |
| EDGE | 48 | Jacob Lane | Jr |
| LB | 49 | Griffin Miller | Jr |
| EDGE | 52 | Devin Hyde | Fr |
| DL | 54 | Anterio Thompson | Sr |
| EDGE | 55 | Victor Sanchez Hernandez | Fr |
| DL | 56 | Annas Davis | Fr |
| LB | 57 | Anthony Ward | Sr |
| DL | 77 | Simote Pepa | Sr |
| DL | 90 | Elinneus Davis | So |
| EDGE | 91 | Isaiah Ward | Jr |
| DL | 92 | Bryce Butler | Jr |
| DL | 93 | Dominic Macon | Fr |
| DL | 94 | Jayvon Parker | Jr |
| DL | 95 | Armon Parker | Jr |
| DL | 97 | Logan Sagapolu | Sr |
| DL | 98 | Omar Khan | Fr |
| DL | 99 | Russell Davis II (injured) | Jr |

Special teams

| Pos. | # | Name | Class |
|---|---|---|---|
| LS | 33 | Ryan Kean | Jr |
| K | 37 | Ethan Moczulski | Jr |
| P | 38 | Trevor Allen | Jr |
| P | 45 | Luke Dunne | So |
| LS | 84 | Hunter Solwold | Fr |
| K | 95 | Grady Gross | Sr |

Head coach

- Jedd Fisch

Coordinators/assistant coaches

- Jimmie Dougherty – Offensive coordinator/quarterbacks
- Michael Switzer – Offensive line
- Jordan Paopao – Tight ends
- Kevin Cummings – Wide receivers
- Scottie Graham – Running backs
- Mike Brewster – Quality control, offense
- J. P. Losman – Quality control, offense
- Dom Caldwell – Quality control, offense
- Luke Del Rio – Quality control, offense
- Caleb Wilson – Quality control, offense
- Jacob Smith – Graduate assistant, offense
- Kekoa Crawford – Graduate assistant, offense
- Ryan Walters – Defensive coordinator
- Jason Kaufusi – Run game coordinator/defensive line
- Brian Odom – Inside linebackers
- John Richardson – Secondary
- Taylor Mays – Safeties
- Aaron Van Horn – Outside linebackers
- Kirkland Parker – Quality control, defense
- Martell Irby – Quality control, defense
- Ben Ford – Quality control, defense
- Austin Karr – Quality control, defense
- Korey Rush – Quality control, defense
- Chris Petrilli – Special teams coordinator
- Greg Froelich – Quality control, special teams
- Tyler Owens – Director, strength and conditioning
- Lance Ancar – Assistant, strength and conditioning
- Aaron Brosz – Assistant, strength and conditioning
- Morris Henry Jr. – Assistant, strength and conditioning
- Cadillac Mitchell – Assistant, strength and conditioning

Legend

- (C) Team captain
- (S) Suspended
- (I) Ineligible
- Injured
- Redshirt

Roster
Last update: 11/11/25
