= 2023 Arizona Wildcats football team =

American college football season

2023 Arizona Wildcats football

Alamo Bowl champion

Alamo Bowl, W 38–24 vs. Oklahoma
- Conference: Pac-12 Conference

Ranking
- Coaches: No. 11
- AP: No. 11
- Record: 10–3 (7–2 Pac-12)
- Head coach: Jedd Fisch (3rd season)
- Offensive coordinator: Brennan Carroll (3rd season)
- Offensive scheme: Pro-style
- Defensive coordinator: Johnny Nansen (2nd season)
- Base defense: 4–3
- Home stadium: Arizona Stadium

2023 Pac-12 Conference football standings
	Conf.			Overall
Team	W		L	W		L
No. 2 Washington y$^	9	–	0	14	–	1
No. 6 Oregon y	8	–	1	12	–	2
No. 11 Arizona	7	–	2	10	–	3
Oregon State	5	–	4	8	–	5
Utah	5	–	4	8	–	5
USC	5	–	4	8	–	5
California	4	–	5	6	–	7
UCLA	4	–	5	8	–	5
Washington State	2	–	7	5	–	7
Stanford	2	–	7	3	–	9
Arizona State*	2	–	7	3	–	9
Colorado	1	–	8	4	–	8
Championship: Washington 34, Oregon 31
^ – College Football Playoff participant; $ – Conference champion; y – Championship game participant; * – Ineligible for postseason play due to self-imposed ban for 2020 recruiting violations; Rankings from AP Poll

The 2023 Arizona Wildcats football team represented the University of Arizona as a member of the Pac-12 Conference during the 2023 NCAA Division I FBS football season. The Wildcats were led by third-year head coach Jedd Fisch and played home games at Arizona Stadium in Tucson, Arizona. 2023 was Arizona's 124th season of competition and the program's 45th and final year in the Pac-12 Conference before it joined the Big 12 Conference in 2024.

The Wildcats ended the season on a seven-game winning streak and finished 10–3, achieving the fourth 10-win regular season in program history. The Wildcats netted a berth in the 2023 Alamo Bowl, the school's first bowl appearance since 2017, where they faced the Oklahoma Sooners. Arizona won 38–24, marking their first bowl victory since 2015. Arizona finished ranked 11th in the final AP Poll, their highest finish in the poll since the 1998 season.

The Arizona Wildcats football team drew an average home attendance of 47,320 in 2023.

== Offseason ==
Positions key
Offense	Defense	Special teams
QB — Quarterback; RB — Running back; FB — Fullback; WR — Wide receiver; TE — Tight end; OL — Offensive lineman; T — Tackle; G — Guard; C — Center	DL — Defensive lineman; DT — Defensive tackle (Note: Includes nose tackle (NT)); DE — Defensive end; EDGE — Edge rusher; LB — Linebacker (Note: Includes middle linebacker (MLB/MIKE), weakside linebacker (WILL), strongside linebacker (SAM), off-ball linebacker, and outside linebacker (OLB)); DB — Defensive back; CB — Cornerback; S — Safety (Note: Includes free safety (FS) and strong safety (SS))	K — Kicker (Note: Also known as a placekicker (PK)); P — Punter; LS — Long snapper; RS — Return specialist (Note: Includes kickoff and punt returners)

=== Team departures ===
Over the course of the off-season, Arizona lost 40 total players. 5 players graduated, 3 declared for the 2023 NFL draft, while the other 33 entered the transfer portal.

2023 Arizona offseason departures
Name	Pos.	Height/Weight	Year	Hometown	Reason
Anthony Simpson	WR	5′11, 205	Sophomore	Pawling, NY	Transferred to UMass
Jalen Harris	DL	6′6, 275	(redshirt) Senior	Gilbert, AZ	Completed college eligibility
Isaiah Rutherford	CB	6′1, 190	Junior	Sacramento, CA	Unknown
Jaydin Young	CB	6′0, 180	Sophomore	Peoria, AZ	Transferred to Oregon State
Jordan McCloud	QB	6′0, 193	Sophomore	Tampa, FL	Transferred to James Madison
Christian Roland-Wallace	CB	6′0, 205	Junior	Palmdale, CA	Transferred to USC
Christian Young	DB	6′3, 225	Senior	Houston, TX	Declared for 2023 NFL draft
Drake Anderson	RB	6′0, 180	Sophomore	Chandler, AZ	Transferred to Akron
Dorian Singer	WR	6′1, 185	Sophomore	Saint Paul, MN	Transferred to USC
Jamayre Joiner	WR	6′1, 220	(redshirt) Junior	Tucson, AZ	Transferred to Jacksonville State
Kolbe Cage	LB	6′1, 215	(redshirt) Freshman	New Orleans, LA	Transferred to Southern Miss
J.B. Brown	DL	6′2, 280	(redshirt) Grad Student	Long Beach, CA	Transferred to UMass
Ma'Jon Wright	lWR	6′2, 218	Freshman	Fort Lauderdale, FL	Transferred to Grambling State
Adama Fall	DB	6′2, 192	(redshirt) Freshman	Simi Valley, CA	Transferred to Arizona State
Jaxen Turner	DB	6′2, 210	Junior	Moreno Valley, CA	Transferred to UNLV
Jalen John	RB	5′11, 225	Sophomore	Portland, OR	Transferred to UMass
Jashon Butler	RB	5′10, 200	(redshirt) Junior	Lynnwood, WA	Transferred
Hunter Echols	DL	6′5, 250	(redshirt) Grad Student	Los Angeles, CA	Declared for 2023 NFL draft
Matthew Weerts	LB	6′1, 220	(redshirt) Freshman	Batavia, IL	Transferred
James Bohls	RB	6′0, 215	(redshirt) Freshman	San Clemente, CA	Transferred to Southern Utah
RJ Edwards	LB	6′2, 222	Junior	Las Vegas, NV	Transferred to UMass
Kevon Garcia	DE	6′2, 230	(redshirt) Freshman	New Orleans, LA	Transferred
Eddie Siaumau-Saniota	DE	6′3, 245	(redshirt) Sophomore	Pago Pago, AS	Transferred
Jerry Roberts	LB	6′2, 230	(redshirt) Grad Student	Erie, PA	Transferred to UMass
Malik Reed	LB	6′2, 230	Sophomore	Chandler, AZ	Transferred
Tyler Martin	LB	6′1, 245	Sophomore	Acton, MA	Transferred to UMass
Evan Branch-Hayes	DL	6′2, 300	(redshirt) Sophomore	Richmond, CA	Transferred to Bowling Green
Josh Donovan	OL	6′6, 325	(redshirt) Senior	College Station, TX	Completed college eligibility
Shontrail Key	OL	6′5, 305	(redshirt) Freshman	Chicago, IL	Transferred to Grambling State
Jack Buford	OT	6′4, 310	Sophomore	St. Louis, MO	Transferred to Lindenwood
Woody Jean	OL	6′4, 315	Sophomore	Deerfield Beach, FL	Transferred to Florida Atlantic
Paiton Fears	DL	6′6, 275	(redshirt) Senior	Mascotte, FL	Declared for 2023 NFL draft
Jake George	WR	6'1, 200	(redshirt) Freshman	Whittier, CA	Unknown
Kyon Barrs	DL	6′4, 310	Junior	Murrieta, CA	Transferred to USC
Dion Wilson Jr.	DL	6′6, 295	Sophomore	Perris, CA	Transferred to New Mexico State
Paris Shand	DL	6′5, 290	Sophomore	Toronto, ON	Transferred to LSU
Alex Lines	TE	6′6, 250	Sophomore	Gilbert, AZ	Transferred
Traemaine Savea	DL	6′2, 295	Senior	Utulei, American Samoa	Completed college eligibility
Jermaine Wiggins Jr.	DL	6′3, 250	Freshman	Boxford, MA	Transferred to UMass

=== Incoming transfers ===
Over the off-season, Arizona added thirteen players via transfer portal. According to 247 Sports, Arizona had the No. 51 ranked transfer class in the country.

Arizona Incoming transfers
Name	Pos.	Height/Weight	Year	Hometown	Previous school	Source
Dylan Wyatt	DB	6′1, 180	Senior	Oakland, CA	Cal Poly	
Montana Lemonious-Craig	WR	6′2, 190	Sophomore	Inglewood, CA	Colorado	
Justin Flowe	LB	6′3, 220	Freshman	Upland, CA	Oregon	
Martell Irby	DB	5′9, 208	Junior	San Diego, CA	UCLA	
David Heimuli	LB	6′0, 225	Sophomore	East Palo Alto, CA	Washington	
Cruz Rushing	DB	6′0, 194	Freshman	Tucson, AZ	Florida	
C. J. Flores	DB	5′11, 190	Freshman	Tucson, AZ	NAU	
Orin Patu	LB	6′4, 235	(redshirt) Junior	Seattle, WA	California	
Sio Nofoagatoto’a	DL	6′3, 315	Senior	Ili'ili, American Samoa	Indiana	
Tyler Manoa	DL	6′4, 300	Senior	Hayward, CA	UCLA	
Bill Norton	DL	6′6, 300	Junior	Memphis, TN	Georgia	
Taylor Upshaw	DL	6′4, 255	Senior	Bradenton, FL	Michigan	
Chase Randall	DL	6′2, 265	Freshman	Tucson, AZ	Valparaiso	
Cash Peterman	K	6′0, 200	Sophomore	Chandler, AZ	BYU	

=== Returning starters ===
Offense
Player	Class	Position
Jayden de Laura	Junior	Quarterback
Michael Wiley	Junior	Running back
Jacob Cowing	Senior	Wide receiver
Tanner McLachlan	RS Senior	Tight end
Keyan Burnett	Sophomore	Tight end
Jordan Morgan	Grad Student	Offensive lineman

Defense
Player	Class	Position
Jason Harris	(redshirt) Sophomore	Defensive lineman
Jacob Manu	Sophomore	Linebacker
Gunner Maldonado	Sophomore	Defensive back

Special teams
Player	Class	Position
Tyler Loop	Junior	Placekicker
Kyle Ostendorp	Senior	Punter

* Bowl game not played. ^ Waiting decision for 2023 season. † Indicates player was a starter in 2021 but missed all of 2022 due to injury.

=== Recruiting class ===
Arizona signed 26 players in the class of 2023. The Wildcats' was ranked forty-fourth by 247Sports and ranked forty-fifth by Rivals.com rankings. One signees were ranked in the ESPN 300 top prospect list. Arizona also signed walk-ons during national signing period.

College recruiting (2023)
Name	Hometown	School	Height	Weight	Commit date
Brayden Dorman; QB	Colorado Springs, CO	Vista Ridge	6 ft 5 in (1.96 m)	195 lb (88 kg)	Feb 22, 2022
Brayden Dorman; QB	Recruit ratings: Rivals: 247Sports: On3: ESPN: (82)				
Leviticus Su'a; LB	Santa Ana, CA	Mater Dei	6 ft 1 in (1.85 m)	215 lb (98 kg)	Jan 20, 2023
Leviticus Su'a; LB	Recruit ratings: Rivals: 247Sports: On3: ESPN: (80)				
Carlos Wilson; WR	Sacramento, CA	Inderkum	6 ft 0 in (1.83 m)	165 lb (75 kg)	Dec 21, 2022
Carlos Wilson; WR	Recruit ratings: Rivals: 247Sports: On3: ESPN: (80)				
Raymond Pulido; OL	Apple Valley, CA	Apple Valley	6 ft 6 in (1.98 m)	325 lb (147 kg)	Aug 13, 2022
Raymond Pulido; OL	Recruit ratings: Rivals: 247Sports: On3: ESPN: (79)				
Brandon Johnson; RB	Palmdale, CA	Highland	6 ft 2 in (1.88 m)	280 lb (130 kg)	Jun 14, 2022
Brandon Johnson; RB	Recruit ratings: Rivals: 247Sports: ESPN: (79)				
Malachi Riley; WR	Corona, CA	Centennial	6 ft 1 in (1.85 m)	165 lb (75 kg)	Dec 16, 2022
Malachi Riley; WR	Recruit ratings: Rivals: 247Sports: On3: ESPN: (79)				
Rhino Tapaatoutai; OT	Mission Hills, CA	Bishop Alemany	6 ft 5 in (1.96 m)	280 lb (130 kg)	Apr 18, 2022
Rhino Tapaatoutai; OT	Recruit ratings: Rivals: 247Sports: On3: ESPN: (78)				
Taye Brown; LB	Chandler, AZ	Hamilton	6 ft 2 in (1.88 m)	220 lb (100 kg)	Nov 26, 2022
Taye Brown; LB	Recruit ratings: Rivals: 247Sports: On3: ESPN: (78)				
Emmanuel Karnley; CB	Pittsburg, CA	Pittsburg	6 ft 2 in (1.88 m)	180 lb (82 kg)	Dec 16, 2022
Emmanuel Karnley; CB	Recruit ratings: Rivals: 247Sports: On3: ESPN: (78)				
Devin Hyatt; WR	Irmo, SC	IMG (FL)	6 ft 1 in (1.85 m)	175 lb (79 kg)	Feb 1, 2023
Devin Hyatt; WR	Recruit ratings: Rivals: 247Sports: On3: ESPN: (78)				
Arian Parish; S	Katy, TX	Katy	5 ft 11 in (1.80 m)	170 lb (77 kg)	Jun 10, 2022
Arian Parish; S	Recruit ratings: Rivals: 247Sports: On3: ESPN: (77)				
Canyon Moses; CB	Midland, TX	Midland	5 ft 9 in (1.75 m)	185 lb (84 kg)	Feb 1, 2022
Canyon Moses; CB	Recruit ratings: Rivals: 247Sports: On3: ESPN: (77)				
Elijha Payne; OT	Las Vegas, NV	Desert Pines	6 ft 6 in (1.98 m)	286 lb (130 kg)	Jul 13, 2022
Elijha Payne; OT	Recruit ratings: Rivals: 247Sports: On3: ESPN: (77)				
Tylen Gonzalez; DE	Carlsbad, NM	Carlsbad	6 ft 5 in (1.96 m)	250 lb (110 kg)	Jun 5, 2022
Tylen Gonzalez; DE	Recruit ratings: Rivals: ESPN: (77)				
Nicholas Gonzalez; DE	San Pedro, CA	San Pedro	6 ft 4 in (1.93 m)	255 lb (116 kg)	Nov 9, 2022
Nicholas Gonzalez; DE	Recruit ratings: Rivals: 247Sports: On3: ESPN: (76)				
Dorian Thomas; TE	Kent, WA	Kentridge	6 ft 6 in (1.98 m)	215 lb (98 kg)	Dec 21, 2022
Dorian Thomas; TE	Recruit ratings: Rivals: 247Sports: On3: ESPN: (76)				
Tristan Davis; DE	Lake Oswego, OR	Lake Oswego	6 ft 6 in (1.98 m)	235 lb (107 kg)	Aug 2, 2022
Tristan Davis; DE	Recruit ratings: Rivals: 247Sports: On3: ESPN: (76)				
Gavin Hunter; ATH	Mililani, HI	Mililani	6 ft 2 in (1.88 m)	190 lb (86 kg)	Jun 8, 2022
Gavin Hunter; ATH	Recruit ratings: Rivals: 247Sports: On3: ESPN: (76)				
Jackson Holman; TE	Mission Viejo, CA	Mission Viejo	6 ft 4 in (1.93 m)	200 lb (91 kg)	Jul 2, 2022
Jackson Holman; TE	Recruit ratings: Rivals: 247Sports: On3: ESPN: (76)				
Julien Savaiinaea; DE	Honolulu, HI	Saint Louis (HI)	6 ft 3 in (1.91 m)	240 lb (110 kg)	Jun 15, 2022
Julien Savaiinaea; DE	Recruit ratings: Rivals: 247Sports: ESPN: (75)				
Dominic Lolesio; DE	Long Beach, CA	Long Beach	6 ft 3 in (1.91 m)	230 lb (100 kg)	Jun 8, 2022
Dominic Lolesio; DE	Recruit ratings: Rivals: 247Sports: ESPN: (75)				
Genesis Smith; S	Chandler, AZ	Hamilton	6 ft 1 in (1.85 m)	190 lb (86 kg)	Aug 27, 2022
Genesis Smith; S	Recruit ratings: Rivals: 247Sports: ESPN: (75)				
Kamuela Kaaihue; LB	Honolulu, HI	Roosevelt	6 ft 2 in (1.88 m)	210 lb (95 kg)	Jun 8, 2022
Kamuela Kaaihue; LB	Recruit ratings: Rivals: 247Sports: ESPN: (73)				
Keanu Mailoto; DT	Auburn, WA	Mt. San Antonio (JC)	6 ft 4 in (1.93 m)	275 lb (125 kg)	Dec 29, 2022
Keanu Mailoto; DT	Recruit ratings: Rivals: 247Sports: ESPN: (70)				
Charles Yates; ATH	Mobile, AL	Los Angeles Pierce (JC)	5 ft 11 in (1.80 m)	190 lb (86 kg)	Jan 7, 2023
Charles Yates; ATH	Recruit ratings: Rivals:				
Overall recruit ranking:
‡ Refers to 40-yard dash; Note: In many cases, Scout, Rivals, 247Sports, On3, and ESPN may conflict in their listings of height, weight and 40 time.; In these cases, the average was taken. ESPN grades are on a 100-point scale.; Sources: "Arizona Football Commitment List". Rivals.; "2023 Player Commitments – Arizona". ESPN.; "2023 Team Ranking". Rivals.com.; "2023 Arizona Wildcats football team". 247Sports.

*= 247Sports Composite rating; ratings are out of 1.00. (five stars= 1.00–.98, four stars= .97–.90, three stars= .80–.89, two stars= .79–.70, no stars= <70)
†= Despite being rated as a four and five star recruit by ESPN, On3.com, Rivals.com and 247Sports.com, Dorman received a four star 247Sports Composite rating.
Δ= Left the Arizona program following signing but prior to the 2023 season.

2023 overall class rankings

Website	National rank	Conference rank	4 star recruits	3 star recruits	2 star recruits	1 star recruits	No star ranking
ESPN	--	--	3	14	0	0	0
On3 Recruits	56	6	1	11	0	0	0
Rivals	36	4	1	11	0	0	0
247 Sports	36	4	1	15	0	0	0

=== Walk-ons ===
Name	Pos.	Height/Weight	Hometown	High school
Tyler Mustain	ATH	6′2, 220	Tucson, AZ	Pusch Ridge
Deric English	WR	6'4, 210	Scottsdale, AZ	Saguaro
Nolan Clement	DE	6′3, 220	Scottsdale, AZ	Desert Mountain
Zarius Wells	OL	6′6, 290	Chandler, AZ	Chandler
Bryce Echols	DL	6′5, 245	Henderson, NV	Coronado
Ammon Kaufusi	DL	6′5, 257	Salt Lake City, UT	Highland

== Preseason ==
=== Spring game ===
The Wildcats were scheduled to hold spring practices on March 13–14, 2023, with spring game is tentatively scheduled to take place in Tucson, Arizona on April 15, 2023, with Blue Team Holds off Red Team 23–19 in Spring Game.

=== Award watch lists ===
Listed in the order that they were released

Award	Player	Position	Year	Ref
Lott Trophy	Justin Flowe	LB	Jr.	
Butkus Award	Justin Flowe	LB	Jr.	
Manning Award	Jayden de Laura	QB	Jr.	
Maxwell Award	Jayden de Laura	QB	Jr.	
Maxwell Award	Jacob Cowing	WR	Sr.	
Paul Hornung Award	Jacob Cowing	WR	Sr.	
Biletnikoff Award	Jacob Cowing	WR	Sr.	
Rotary Lombardi Award	Jordan Morgan	OT	Sr.	
Wuerffel Trophy	Jordan Morgan	OT	Sr.	
Outland Trophy	Jordan Morgan	OT	Sr.	
Outland Trophy	Jonah Savaiinaea	OT	So.	
Polynesian College Football Player Of The Year Award	Jonah Savaiinaea	OT	So.	
Polynesian College Football Player Of The Year Award	Sio Nofoagatoto’a	DL	Sr.	
Polynesian College Football Player Of The Year Award	Tiaoalii Savea	DL	Jr.	
Polynesian College Football Player Of The Year Award	Jacob Manu	LB	So.	
Polynesian College Football Player Of The Year Award	Tetairoa McMillan	WR	So.	
Lou Groza Award	Tyler Loop	PK	Jr.	
Ray Guy Award	Kyle Ostendorp	P	Sr.	
Doak Walker Award	Michael Wiley	RB	Sr.	
Earl Campbell Tyler Rose Award	Michael Wiley	RB	Sr.	

=== Pac-12 Media Day ===
The Pac-12 Media Day was held on July 21, 2023, at the TBD in Las Vegas, NV (Pac-12 Network). The preseason polls will be released in July 2023. Arizona was picked to finish in eighth place in the conference.

=== Preseason All-Pac-12 ===
Second team

Position	Player	Class
Offense
WR	Jacob Cowing	Senior
Special Teams
AP	Jacob Cowing	Senior

Second Team All-Americans
Player	Position	AP	AS	CBS Sports	ESPN	PFF	Sporting News	WCFF	Designation
Jacob Cowing	WR	✓							

== Schedule ==
Date	Time	Opponent	Rank	Site	TV	Result	Attendance
September 2	7:00 p.m.	Northern Arizona*		Arizona Stadium; Tucson, AZ	P12N	W 38–3	48,159
September 9	4:30 p.m.	at Mississippi State*		Davis Wade Stadium; Starkville, MS	SECN	L 24–31 ^{OT}	51,648
September 16	8:00 p.m.	UTEP*		Arizona Stadium; Tucson, AZ	P12N	W 31–10	44,182
September 23	4:00 p.m.	at Stanford		Stanford Stadium; Stanford, CA	P12N	W 21–20	38,046
September 30	7:00 p.m.	No. 7 Washington		Arizona Stadium; Tucson, AZ	P12N	L 24–31	50,800
October 7	7:30 p.m.	at No. 9 USC		LA Memorial Coliseum; Los Angeles, CA	ESPN	L 41–43 ^{3OT}	62,916
October 14	4:00 p.m.	at No. 19 Washington State		Martin Stadium; Pullman, WA	P12N	W 44–6	26,155
October 28	7:30 p.m.	No. 11 Oregon State		Arizona Stadium; Tucson, AZ	ESPN	W 27–24	45,023
November 4	7:30 p.m.	No. 19 UCLA^{†}		Arizona Stadium; Tucson, AZ	FS1	W 27–10	44,956
November 11	12:00 p.m.	at Colorado	No. 21	Folsom Field; Boulder, CO	P12N	W 34–31	52,788
November 18	12:30 p.m.	No. 22 Utah	No. 17	Arizona Stadium; Tucson, AZ	P12N	W 42–18	50,800
November 25	1:30 p.m.	at Arizona State	No. 15	Mountain America Stadium; Tempe, AZ (Territorial Cup)	ESPN	W 59–23	53,414
December 28	7:15 pm	vs. No. 12 Oklahoma	No. 14	Alamodome; San Antonio, TX (Alamo Bowl)	ESPN	W 38–24	55,853
*Non-conference game; ^{†}Homecoming; Rankings from AP Poll (and CFP Rankings, after October 31) - Released prior to game; All times are in Mountain time

== Personnel ==
=== Roster ===
2023 Arizona Wildcats football team roster
Players
Coaches
Offense

Pos.	#	Name	Class
WR	2	Jacob Cowing (C)	Sr
RB	3	Jonah Coleman	So
WR	4	Tetairoa McMillan	So
WR	5	Montana Lemonious-Craig	So
RB	6	Michael Wiley (C)	Sr
QB	7	Jayden de Laura (C)	Jr
RB	8	D. J. Williams	GS
WR	9	Jackson Holman	Fr
WR	10	Malachi Riley	Fr
QB	11	Noah Fifita	Fr
WR	12	Kevin Green Jr.	Fr
WR	13	Jaden Clark	So
QB	14	Cole Tannenbaum	So
WR	15	Carlos Wilson	Fr
WR	16	A. J. Jones	Fr
QB	17	Brayden Dorman	Fr
RB	21	Rayshon Luke	So
RB	23	Stevie Rocker Jr.	So
WR	25	Chris Hunter	Fr
RB	28	Nazar Bombata	Sr
RB	29	Brandon Johnson	Fr
WR	31	Deric English	Fr
OL	54	Jacob Reece	Fr
OL	55	J. T. Hand	So
OL	56	Tylen Gonzalez	Fr
OL	58	Sam Langi	Sr
OL	59	Rhino Tapa'atoutai	Fr
OL	62	Joseph Borjon	So
OL	63	Elijha Payne	Fr
OL	65	Leif Magnuson	So
OL	70	Zarius Wells	Fr
OL	71	Jonah Savaiinaea	So
OL	72	Wendell Moe	Fr
OL	75	Josh Baker	Jr
OL	76	Anthony Patt	So
OL	77	Jordan Morgan (C)	Sr
OL	78	Grayson Stovall	Fr
OL	79	Raymond Pulido	Fr
WR	80	Devin Hyatt	Fr
WR	81	Julius Oliver	Fr
TE	82	Dorian Thomas	Fr
WR	83	Sam Graci-Glazer	Fr
TE	84	Tanner McLachlan	Sr
TE	85	Roberto Miranda	So
TE	86	John Hart	Fr
TE	87	Tyler Powell	Fr
TE	88	Keyan Burnett	So

Defense

Pos.	#	Name	Class
CB	2	Treydan Stukes (C)	Jr
CB	3	Dylan Wyatt	GS
S	4	Isaiah Taylor	So
LB	5	Jacob Manu (C)	So
LB	6	Taye Brown	Fr
CB	7	Ephesians Prysock	So
LB	8	Sterling Lane II	So
S	9	Gunner Maldonado (C)	Jr
LB	10	Justin Flowe	So
DE	11	Taylor Upshaw	GS
S	12	Genesis Smith	Fr
DB	13	Martell Irby (C)	Sr
S	14	D. J. Warnell Jr.	Jr
LB	15	Daniel Heimuli	Jr
S	16	Gavin Hunter	Fr
DB	17	Charles Yates Jr.	Jr
LB	18	Kamuela Ka'aihue	Fr
CB	23	Tacario Davis	So
CB	24	Jai-Ayviauynn Celestine	Fr
DB	25	Arian Parish	Fr
DB	26	Canyon Moses	Fr
S	27	Will Uhrich	So
CB	29	Devin Dunn	Fr
S	30	Jax Stam	Fr
S	31	Cruz Rushing	Fr
CB	33	Emmanuel Karnley	Fr
DL	34	Ammon Kaufusi	Fr
DB	35	C. J. Flores	Fr
LB	36	Dominic Hanger	Fr
DE	37	Nolan Clement	Fr
CB	39	Jeffrey Robinson	So
LB	40	Ammon Allen	So
DL	41	Julian Savaiinaea	Fr
DE	42	Dominic Lolesio	Fr
S	43	Dalton Johnson	So
LB	44	Jeremy Mercier	Sr
DL	45	Bill Norton	Sr
DL	46	Ta'ita'i Uiagalelei	So
DB	47	Rex Haynes	Fr
DL	48	Orin Patu	Sr
DL	50	Sio Nofoagatoto'a	Sr
LB	51	Tyler Mustain	Fr
LB	52	Brandon Craddock	Fr
DE	53	Christian Madoski	Fr
DL	54	Chase Randall	So
LB	55	Leviticus Su'a	Fr
DL	56	Bryce Echols	Fr
LB	57	Anthony Ward	So
DL	90	Isaiah Ward	Fr
DL	91	Isaiah Johnson	Fr
DL	92	Tyler Manoa	Sr
DL	93	Jacob Kongaika	So
DL	95	Keanu Mailoto	Fr
DL	96	Nick Fernandez	Fr
DE	97	Tristan Davis	Fr
DL	98	Tiaoalii Savea	Jr
DL	99	Russell Davis II	So

Special teams

Pos.	#	Name	Class
P	19	Kyle Ostendorp	Sr
PK	33	Tyler Loop	Jr
LS	39	Kameron Hawkins	Jr
P	49	Jordan Forbes	Fr
LS	64	Seth MacKellar	Sr
P	99	Cash Peterman	Jr

Head coach

- Jedd Fisch

Coordinators/assistant coaches

- Brennan Carroll – Offensive coordinator/offensive linemen
- Johnny Nansen – Defensive coordinator
- Jimmie Dougherty – Passing game coordinator/quarterbacks
- Jordan Paopao – Special teams coordinator/tight ends
- Chuck Cecil – Defensive backs
- Kevin Cummings – Wide receivers
- Scottie Graham – Running backs
- Ricky Hunley – Defensive linemen
- Jason Kaufusi – Defensive ends/outside linebackers
- John Richardson – Cornerbacks
- Duane Akina – Secondary
- Darren Andrews – Offensive analyst
- Luke McNitt – Offensive analyst
- Michael Switzer – Offensive analyst
- Brett Arce – Defensive analyst
- Ty Nichols – Defensive analyst
- Carson Bicknell – Special teams analyst
- Teddy Bolin – Graduate assistant
- Dominic Caldwell – Graduate assistant
- Jacob Smith – Graduate assistant
- Aaron Van Horn – Graduate assistant
- Andrew Sims – Director, Football Operations
- Tyler Owens – Director, strength & conditioning

Legend

- (C) Team captain
- (S) Suspended
- (I) Ineligible
- Injured
- Redshirt

Roster
Last update: 8/23/23

== Game summaries ==
=== vs Northern Arizona ===
Northern Arizona Lumberjacks (0–0) vs Arizona Wildcats (0–0) – Game summary

Quarter	1	2	3	4	Total
Lumberjacks	0	3	0	0	3
Wildcats	7	7	21	3	38

at Arizona Stadium • Tucson, AZ

- Date: September 2, 2023
- Game time: 7:00 p.m.
- Game weather: Sunny, 88 °F (31 °C)
- Game attendance: 48,159
- Referee: Cravonne Barrett
- TV announcers (Pac-12 Network): J. B. Long (play-by-play), Max Browne (analyst)

Game information

First quarter

- (11:13) ARIZ – Jacob Cowing 4-yard pass from Jayden de Laura, Tyler Loop kick (Drive: 7 plays, 65 yards, 3:47; Arizona 7–0)

Second quarter

- (13:24) ARIZ – Jonah Coleman 7-yard pass from Jayden de Laura, Tyler Loop kick (Drive: 7 plays, 78 yards, 3:04; Arizona 14–0)
- (0:00) NAU – Marcus Lye 49-yard field goal (Drive: 16 plays, 49 yards, 7:43; Arizona 14–3)

Third quarter

- (11:26) ARIZ – Tacario Davis 85-yard blocked field goal return, Tyler Loop kick (Arizona 21–3)
- (4:34) ARIZ – Tetairoa McMillan 5-yard pass from Jayden de Laura, Tyler Loop kick (Drive: 4 plays, 37 yards, 2:04; Arizona 28–3)
- (2:02) ARIZ – Jayden de Laura 53-yard run, Tyler Loop kick (Drive: 3 plays, 63 yards, 1:07; Arizona 35–3)

Fourth quarter

- (10:46) ARIZ – Tyler Loop 35-yard field goal (Drive: 7 plays, 64 yards, 2:32; Arizona 38–3)

Statistics	NAU	ARIZ
First downs	17	22
Total yards	264	478
Rushing yards	41–78	27–186
Passing yards	186	292
Passing: Comp–Att–Int	18–29–0	20–26–1
Time of possession	35:04	24:56

Team	Category	Player	Statistics
Northern Arizona	Passing	Kai Millner	14/22, 166 yards
Northern Arizona	Rushing	T. J. McDaniel	14 carries, 56 yards
Northern Arizona	Receiving	Coleman Owen	5 receptions, 90 yards
Arizona	Passing	Jayden de Laura	18/24, 285 yards, 3 TD, INT
Arizona	Rushing	Michael Wiley	10 carries, 54 yards
Arizona	Receiving	Michael Wiley	6 receptions, 57 yards

=== at Mississippi State ===
Arizona Wildcats (1–0) at Mississippi State Bulldogs (1–0) – Game summary

Quarter	1	2	3	4	OT	Total
Wildcats	0	7	7	10	0	24
Bulldogs	14	0	7	3	7	31

at Davis Wade Stadium • Starkville, MS

- Date: September 9, 2023
- Game time: 6:30 p.m.
- Game weather: Sunny, 82 °F (28 °C)
- Game attendance: 51,648
- Referee: John Love
- TV announcers (SEC Network): Tom Hart (play-by-play), Jordan Rodgers (analyst), Cole Cubelic (sideline)

Game information

First quarter

- (5:06) MSST – Lideatrick Griffin 23-yard pass from Will Rogers, Kyle Ferrie kick (Drive: 4 plays, 50 yards, 1:53; Mississippi State 7–0)
- (3:27) MSST – Jo'Quavious Marks 1-yard run, Kyle Ferrie kick (Drive: 2 plays, 6 yards, 0:22; Mississippi State 14–0)

Second quarter

- (0:02) ARIZ – Jayden de Laura 1-yard run, Tyler Loop kick (Drive: 3 plays, 77 yards, 0:38; Mississippi State 14–7)

Third quarter

- (11:07) MSST – Lideatrick Griffin 15-yard pass from Will Rogers, Kyle Ferrie kick (Drive: 4 plays, 30 yards, 2:06; Mississippi State 21–7)
- (6:34) ARIZ– Jacob Cowing 17-yard pass from Jayden de Laura, Tyler Loop kick (Drive: 10 plays, 75 yards, 4:33; Mississippi State 21–14)

Fourth quarter

- (9:14) ARIZ – Tetairoa McMillan 11-yard pass from Jayden de Laura, Tyler Loop kick (Drive: 9 plays, 80 yards, 3:40; Tied 21–21)
- (6:47) MSST – Kyle Ferrie 36-yard field goal (Drive: 5 plays, 57 yards, 2:27; Mississippi State 24–21)
- (0:05) ARIZ – Tyler Loop 36-yard field goal (Drive: 5 plays, 57 yards, 2:31; Tied 24–24)

Overtime

- (0:00) MSST – Jeffery Pittman 29-yard pass from Will Rogers, Kyle Ferrie kick (Drive: 2 plays, 25 yards, 0:00; Mississippi State 31–24)

Statistics	ARIZ	MSST
First downs	23	16
Total yards	431	307
Rushing yards	25–91	38–145
Passing yards	340	162
Passing: Comp–Att–Int	33–47–4	13–17–0
Time of possession	32:22	27:38

Team	Category	Player	Statistics
Arizona	Passing	Jayden de Laura	32/46, 342 yards, 2 TD, 4 INT
Arizona	Rushing	Jayden de Laura	8 carries, 44 yards, TD
Arizona	Receiving	Tetairoa McMillan	8 receptions, 161 yards, TD
Mississippi State	Passing	Will Rogers	13/17, 162 yards, 3 TD
Mississippi State	Rushing	Jo'Quavious Marks	24 carries, 123 yards, TD
Mississippi State	Receiving	Lideatrick Griffin	5 receptions, 83 yards, 2 TD

=== vs UTEP ===
UTEP Miners (1–2) vs Arizona Wildcats (1–1) – Game summary

Quarter	1	2	3	4	Total
Miners	0	3	0	7	10
Wildcats	0	14	10	7	31

at Arizona Stadium • Tucson, AZ

- Date: September 16, 2023
- Game time: 8:00 p.m.
- Game weather: Sunny, 89 °F (32 °C)
- Game attendance: 44,182
- Referee: Mark Duddy
- TV announcers (Pac-12 Network): Jordan Kent (play-by-play), Bob Davie (analyst)

Game information

First quarter

None

Second quarter

- (14:53) ARIZ – Tetairoa McMillan 18-yard pass from Jayden de Laura, Tyler Loop kick (Drive: 7 plays, 92 yards, 2:38; Arizona 7–0)
- (5:13) UTEP – Buzz Flabiano 25-yard field goal (Drive: 7 plays, 65 yards, 3:40; Arizona 7–3)
- (1:23) ARIZ – Michael Wiley 3-yard run, Tyler Loop kick (Drive: 10 plays, 74 yards, 3:44; Arizona 14–3)

Third quarter

- (8:59) ARIZ – Tyler Loop 38-yard field goal (Drive: 8 plays, 54 yards, 4:33; Arizona 17–3)
- (2:42) ARIZ – Jacob Cowing 2-yard pass from Jayden de Laura, Tyler Loop kick (Drive: 6 plays, 82 yards, 3:13; Arizona 24–3)

Fourth quarter

- (9:19) ARIZ – Montana Lemonious-Craig 4-yard pass from Jayden de Laura, Tyler Loop kick (Drive: 3 plays, 26 yards, 1:26; Arizona 31–3)
- (1:32) UTEP – Javoni Gardere 25-yard pass from Kevin Hurley, Buzz Flabiano kick (Drive: 7 plays, 75 yards, 3:12; Arizona 31–10)

Statistics	UTEP	ARIZ
First downs	13	26
Total yards	332	544
Rushing yards	26–49	32–244
Passing yards	283	300
Passing: Comp–Att–Int	18–35–0	25–32–0
Time of possession	29:43	30:17

Team	Category	Player	Statistics
UTEP	Passing	Gavin Hardison	15/31, 228 yards
UTEP	Rushing	Deion Hankins	9 carries, 34 yards
UTEP	Receiving	Torrance Burgess Jr.	3 receptions, 78 yards
Arizona	Passing	Jayden de Laura	23/29, 285 yards, 3 TD
Arizona	Rushing	Michael Wiley	17 carries, 87 yards, TD
Arizona	Receiving	Tetairoa McMillan	6 receptions, 89 yards, TD

=== at Stanford ===
Arizona Wildcats (2–1) at Stanford Cardinal (1–2) – Game summary

Quarter	1	2	3	4	Total
Wildcats	0	7	7	7	21
Cardinal	3	7	7	3	20

at Stanford Stadium • Stanford, CA

- Date: September 23, 2023
- Game time: 4:00 p.m.
- Game weather: Sunny, 66 °F (19 °C)
- Game attendance: 38,046
- Referee: Mike McCabe
- TV announcers (Pac-12 Network): Ted Robinson (play-by-play), Yogi Roth (analyst)

Game information

First quarter

- (10:35) STAN – Joshua Karty 35-yard field goal (Drive: 7 plays, 38 yards, 3:39; Stanford 3–0)

Second quarter

- (13:37) ARIZ – Tanner McLachlan 36-yard pass from Jayden de Laura, Tyler Loop kick (Drive: 3 plays, 67 yards, 1:23; Arizona 7–3)
- (5:44) STAN – Bryce Farrell 2-yard run, Joshua Karty kick (Drive: 10 plays, 50 yards, 4:58; Stanford 10–7)

Third quarter

- (5:53) ARIZ – Jayden de Laura 7-yard run, Tyler Loop kick (Drive: 11 plays, 66 yards, 5:45; Arizona 14–10)
- (1:49) STAN – Sedrick Irvin 1-yard run, Joshua Karty kick (Drive: 11 plays, 75 yards, 4:04; Stanford 17–14)

Fourth quarter

- (7:42) ARIZ – D. J. Williams 2-yard run, Tyler Loop kick (Drive: 9 plays, 67 yards, 3:58; Arizona 21–17)
- (3:09) STAN – Joshua Karty 46-yard field goal (Drive: 10 plays, 47 yards, 4:34; Arizona 21–20)

Statistics	ARIZ	STAN
First downs	20	18
Total yards	349	354
Rushing yards	37–145	34–108
Passing yards	204	246
Passing: Comp–Att–Int	18–30–0	18–32–0
Time of possession	28:51	31:09

Team	Category	Player	Statistics
Arizona	Passing	Jayden de Laura	14/26, 157 yards, TD
Arizona	Rushing	Jonah Coleman	12 carries, 75 yards
Arizona	Receiving	Jacob Cowing	8 receptions, 85 yards
Stanford	Passing	Ashton Daniels	14/26, 198 yards
Stanford	Rushing	Sedrick Irvin	10 carries, 70 yards, TD
Stanford	Receiving	Tiger Bachmeier	4 receptions, 93 yards

=== vs No. 7 Washington ===
No. 7 Washington Huskies (4–0) vs Arizona Wildcats (3–1) – Game summary

Quarter	1	2	3	4	Total
Huskies	14	7	7	3	31
Wildcats	0	10	7	7	24

at Arizona Stadium • Tucson, AZ

- Date: September 30, 2023
- Game time: 7:00 p.m.
- Game weather: Clear, 73 °F (23 °C)
- Game attendance: 50,800
- Referee: Justin Elliott
- TV announcers (Pac-12 Network): Ted Robinson (play-by-play), Yogi Roth (analyst)

Game information

First quarter

- (6:02) WASH – Dillon Johnson 4-yard run, Grady Gross kick (Drive: 12 plays, 95 yards, 6:59; Washington 7–0)
- (0:38) WASH – Germie Bernard 3-yard run, Grady Gross kick (Drive: 7 plays, 57 yards, 3:13; Washington 14–0)

Second quarter

- (9:31) ARIZ – Jacob Cowing 8-yard pass from Noah Fifita, Tyler Loop kick (Drive: 12 plays, 75 yards, 6:07; Washington 14–7)
- (3:31) WASH – Will Nixon 5-yard run, Grady Gross kick (Drive: 12 plays, 73 yards, 5:58; Washington 21–7)
- (0:23) ARIZ – Tyler Loop 30-yard field goal (Drive: 12 plays, 62 yards, 3:08; Washington 21–10)

Third quarter

- (6:42) WASH – Dillon Johnson 4-yard run, Grady Gross kick (Drive: 7 plays, 84 yards, 3:34; Washington 28–10)
- (3:03) ARIZ – Tetairoa McMillan 1-yard pass from Noah Fifita, Tyler Loop kick (Drive: 7 plays, 75 yards, 3:39; Washington 28–17)

Fourth quarter

- (13:24) WASH – Grady Gross 37-yard field goal (Drive: 11 plays, 55 yards, 4:39; Washington 31–17)
- (1:08) ARIZ – Tetairoa McMillan 10-yard pass from Noah Fifita, Tyler Loop kick (Drive: 11 plays, 90 yards, 2:47; Washington 31–24)

Statistics	WASH	ARIZ
First downs	26	27
Total yards	474	342
Rushing yards	26–111	31–110
Passing yards	363	232
Passing: Comp–Att–Int	30–40–0	27–39–1
Time of possession	29:51	30:09

Team	Category	Player	Statistics
Washington	Passing	Michael Penix Jr.	30/40, 363 yards
Washington	Rushing	Dillon Johnson	16 carries, 91 yards, 2 TD
Washington	Receiving	Germie Bernard	8 receptions, 89 yards
Arizona	Passing	Noah Fifita	27/39, 232 yards, 3 TD, INT
Arizona	Rushing	Jonah Coleman	12 carries, 44 yards
Arizona	Receiving	Jacob Cowing	8 receptions, 61 yards, TD

=== at No. 9 USC ===
Arizona Wildcats (3–2) at No. 9 USC Trojans (5–0) – Game summary

Quarter	1	2	3	4	OT	2OT	3OT	Total
Wildcats	10	7	3	8	7	6	0	41
No. 9 Trojans	0	14	7	7	7	6	2	43

at Los Angeles Memorial Coliseum • Los Angeles, CA

- Date: October 7, 2023
- Game time: 7:30 p.m.
- Game weather: Clear, 71 °F (22 °C)
- Game attendance: 62,916
- Referee: Jeff Dahle
- TV announcers (ESPN): Dave Flemming (play-by-play), Brock Osweiler (analyst) & Kayla Burton (sideline)

Game information

First quarter

- (10:12) ARIZ – Tyler Loop 23-yard field goal (Drive: 8 plays, 60 yards, 3:19; Arizona 3–0)
- (4:59) ARIZ – Jacob Cowing 23-yard pass from Noah Fifita, Tyler Loop kick (Drive: 10 plays, 64 yards, 4:21; Arizona 10–0)

Second quarter

- (13:05) ARIZ – Tanner McLachlan 18-yard pass from Noah Fifita, Tyler Loop kick (Drive: 11 plays, 92 yards, 5:51; Arizona 17–0)
- (9:43) USC – Caleb Williams 3-yard run, Denis Lynch kick (Drive: 2 plays, 12 yards, 1:22; Arizona 17–7)
- (13:05) USC – Kyron Hudson 5-yard pass from Caleb Williams, Denis Lynch kick (Drive: 6 plays, 65 yards, 2:50; Arizona 17–14)

Third quarter

- (10:20) ARIZ – Tyler Loop 22-yard field goal (Drive: 7 plays, 70 yards, 4:40; Arizona 20–14)
- (5:44) USC – MarShawn Lloyd 9-yard run, Denis Lynch kick (Drive: 8 plays, 75 yards, 4:36; USC 21–20)

Fourth quarter

- (12:54) USC – Caleb Williams 1-yard run, Denis Lynch kick (Drive: 11 plays, 76 yards, 5:29; USC 28–20)
- (8:17) ARIZ – Jacob Cowing 3-yard pass from Noah Fifita, Noah Fifita two-point pass to Tetairoa McMillan (Drive: 10 plays, 75 yards, 4:37; Tied 28–28)

First overtime

- USC – Caleb Williams 18-yard run, Denis Lynch kick (Drive: 5 plays, 25 yards; USC 35–28)
- ARIZ – Jacob Cowing 25-yard pass from Noah Fifita, Tyler Loop kick (Drive: 1 play, 25 yards; Tied 35–35)

Second overtime

- ARIZ – Jacob Cowing 8-yard pass from Noah Fifita, two-point pass failed (Drive: 5 plays, 25 yards; Arizona 41–35)
- USC – Austin Jones 11-yard run, two-point pass failed (Drive: 3 plays, 25 yards; Tied 41–41)

Third overtime

- USC - Caleb Williams run for two-point conversion (USC 43-41)

Statistics	ARIZ	USC
First downs	28	23
Total yards	506	365
Rushing yards	42–203	33–146
Passing yards	303	219
Passing: Comp–Att–Int	25–35–1	14–25–0
Time of possession	35:39	24:21

Team	Category	Player	Statistics
Arizona	Passing	Noah Fifita	25/35, 303 yards, 5 TD, INT
Arizona	Rushing	Jonah Coleman	22 carries, 143 yards
Arizona	Receiving	Tetairoa McMillan	6 receptions, 138 yards
USC	Passing	Caleb Williams	14/25, 219 yards, TD
USC	Rushing	MarShawn Lloyd	15 carries, 86 yards, TD
USC	Receiving	Brenden Rice	4 receptions, 96 yards

=== at No. 19 Washington State ===
Arizona Wildcats (3–3) at No. 19 Washington State Cougars (4–1) – Game summary

Quarter	1	2	3	4	Total
Wildcats	10	10	10	14	44
No. 19 Cougars	6	0	0	0	6

at Martin Stadium • Pullman, WA

- Date: October 14, 2023
- Game time: 4:07 p.m.
- Game weather: Sunny, 67 °F (19 °C)
- Game attendance: 26,155
- Referee: Matthew Richards
- TV announcers (Pac-12 Network): Ted Robinson (play-by-play), Yogi Roth (analyst)

Game information

First quarter

- (10:01) WSU – Nakia Watson 1-yard run, two-point pass failed (Drive: 11 plays, 75 yards, 4:59; Washington State 6–0)
- (8:29) ARIZ – Jonah Coleman 1-yard run, Tyler Loop kick (Drive: 4 plays, 75 yards, 1:32; Arizona 7–6)
- (5:18) ARIZ – Tyler Loop 37-yard field goal (Drive: 5 plays, 13 yards, 1:34; Arizona 10–6)

Second quarter

- (14:53) ARIZ – Rayshon Luke 40-yard run, Tyler Loop kick (Drive: 9 plays, 85 yards, 4:07; Arizona 17–6)
- (8:07) ARIZ – Tyler Loop 40-yard field goal (Drive: 11 plays, 38 yards, 4:48; Arizona 20–6)

Third quarter

- (10:49) ARIZ – Tyler Loop 21-yard field goal (Drive: 10 plays, 71 yards, 4:11; Arizona 23–6)
- (2:57) ARIZ – Jonah Coleman 1-yard run, Tyler Loop kick (Drive: 16 plays, 60 yards, 7:11; Arizona 30–6)

Fourth quarter

- (12:37) ARIZ – DJ Williams 15-yard run, Tyler Loop kick (Drive: 1 play, 15 yards, 0:05; Arizona 37–6)
- (6:52) ARIZ – Jonah Coleman 23-yard run, Tyler Loop kick (Drive: 7 plays, 79 yards, 3:59; Arizona 44–6)

Statistics	ARIZ	WSU
First downs	26	12
Total yards	516	234
Rushing yards	37–174	22–35
Passing yards	342	199
Passing: Comp–Att–Int	34–43–0	23–33–2
Time of possession	38:39	21:21

Team	Category	Player	Statistics
Arizona	Passing	Noah Fifita	34/43, 342 yards
Arizona	Rushing	Rayshon Luke	10 carries, 71 yards, TD
Arizona	Receiving	Jonah Coleman	4 receptions, 98 yards
Washington State	Passing	Cam Ward	22/30, 192 yards, INT
Washington State	Rushing	Dylan Paine	3 carries, 23 yards
Washington State	Receiving	Nakia Watson	5 receptions, 88 yards

=== vs No. 11 Oregon State ===
No. 11 Oregon State Beavers (6–1) vs Arizona Wildcats (4–3) – Game summary

Quarter	1	2	3	4	Total
No. 11 Beavers	7	3	0	14	24
Wildcats	3	7	3	14	27

at Arizona Stadium • Tucson, AZ

- Date: October 28, 2023
- Game time: 7:30 p.m.
- Game weather: Clear, 74 °F (23 °C)
- Game attendance: 45,023
- TV announcers (ESPN): Brian Custer (play-by-play), Rod Gilmore (analyst), Lauren Sisler (sideline)

Game information

First quarter

- (8:28) OSU – Jack Velling 22-yard pass from DJ Uiagalelei, Atticus Sappington kick (Drive: 12 plays, 75 yards, 6:32; Oregon State 7–0)
- (1:34) ARIZ – Tyler Loop 51-yard field goal (Drive: 14 plays, 41 yards, 6:54; Oregon State 7–3)

Second quarter

- (10:32) ARIZ – Tetairoa McMillan 7-yard pass from Noah Fifita, Tyler Loop kick (Drive: 7 plays, 94 yards, 3:22; Arizona 10–7)
- (5:13) OSU – Atticus Sappington 35-yard field goal (Drive: 9 plays, 61 yards, 5:19; Tied 10–10)

Third quarter

- (11:27) ARIZ – Tyler Loop 25-yard field goal (Drive: 9 plays, 67 yards, 3:33; Arizona 13–10)

Fourth quarter

- (14:47) OSU – Silas Bolden 8-yard run, Atticus Sappington kick (Drive: 9 plays, 80 yards, 4:06; Oregon State 17–13)
- (8:46) ARIZ – Michael Wiley 40-yard pass from Noah Fifita, Tyler Loop kick (Drive: 2 plays, 40 yards, 0:45; Arizona 20–17)
- (2:22) ARIZ – Michael Wiley 3-yard pass from Noah Fifita, Tyler Loop kick (Drive: 10 plays, 55 yards, 5:20; Arizona 27–17)
- (1:38) OSU – Jimmy Valsin III 20-yard pass from DJ Uiagalelei, Atticus Sappington kick (Drive: 4 plays, 75 yards, 0:44; Arizona 27–24)

Statistics	OSU	ARIZ
First downs	23	21
Total yards	407	363
Rushing yards	29–131	30–88
Passing yards	276	275
Passing: Comp–Att–Int	18–33–0	25–32–1
Time of possession	29:14	30:46

Team	Category	Player	Statistics
Oregon State	Passing	DJ Uiagalelei	16/30, 218 yards, 2 TD
Oregon State	Rushing	Damien Martinez	14 carries, 87 yards
Oregon State	Receiving	Jack Velling	5 receptions, 71 yards, TD
Arizona	Passing	Noah Fifita	25/32, 275 yards, 3 TD, INT
Arizona	Rushing	Jonah Coleman	11 carries, 55 yards
Arizona	Receiving	Tetairoa McMillan	8 receptions, 80 yards, TD

=== vs No. 19 UCLA ===
No. 19 UCLA Bruins (6–2) vs Arizona Wildcats (5–3) – Game summary

Quarter	1	2	3	4	Total
No. 19 Bruins	0	7	3	0	10
Wildcats	7	7	3	10	27

at Arizona Stadium • Tucson, AZ

- Date: November 4, 2023
- Game time: 7:30 p.m.
- Game weather: Clear, 75 °F (24 °C)
- Game attendance: 44,956
- Referee: John Love
- TV announcers (FS1): Jeff Levering (play-by-play), Mark Helfrich (analyst)

Game information

First quarter

- (2:27) ARIZ – Montana Lemonious-Craig 9-yard pass from Noah Fifita, Tyler Loop kick (Drive: 11 plays, 76 yards, 5:10; Arizona 7–0)

Second quarter

- (1:27) ARIZ – Jacob Cowing 9-yard pass from Noah Fifita, Tyler Loop kick (Drive: 7 plays, 61 yards, 3:07; Arizona 14–0)
- (0:03) UCLA – Carsen Ryan 14-yard pass from Ethan Garbers, Blake Glessner kick (Drive: 8 plays, 75 yards, 1:24; Arizona 14–7)

Third quarter

- (8:15) ARIZ – Tyler Loop 37-yard field goal (Drive: 14 plays, 55 yards, 6:45; Arizona 17–7)
- (2:28) UCLA – Blake Glessner 29-yard field goal (Drive: 14 plays, 64 yards, 5:47; Arizona 17–10)

Fourth quarter

- (14:37) ARIZ – Tetairoa McMillan 11-yard pass from Noah Fifita, Tyler Loop kick (Drive: 6 plays, 75 yards, 2:51; Arizona 24–10)
- (4:40) ARIZ – Tyler Loop 22-yard field goal (Drive: 5 plays, 72 yards, 3:12; Arizona 27–10)

Statistics	UCLA	ARIZ
First downs	17	23
Total yards	271	429
Rushing yards	29–114	35–129
Passing yards	157	300
Passing: Comp–Att–Int	17–33–0	25–33–1
Time of possession	24:46	35:14

Team	Category	Player	Statistics
UCLA	Passing	Ethan Garbers	13/21, 143 yards, TD
UCLA	Rushing	Collin Schlee	6 carries, 46 yards
UCLA	Receiving	Logan Loya	3 receptions, 42 yards
Arizona	Passing	Noah Fifita	25/32, 300 yards, 3 TD, INT
Arizona	Rushing	Jonah Coleman	17 carries, 77 yards
Arizona	Receiving	Tetairoa McMillan	4 receptions, 81 yards, TD

=== at Colorado ===
No. 21 Arizona Wildcats (6–3) at Colorado Buffaloes (4–5) – Game summary

Quarter	1	2	3	4	Total
No. 21 Wildcats	7	10	7	10	34
Buffaloes	14	10	7	0	31

at Folsom Field • Boulder, CO

- Date: November 11, 2023
- Game time: 12:00 p.m.
- Game weather: Sunny, 57 °F (14 °C)
- Game attendance: 52,788
- Referee: Cravonne Barrett
- TV announcers (Pac-12 Network): Ted Robinson (play-by-play), Yogi Roth (analyst)

Game information

First quarter

- (11:14) COLO – Shedeur Sanders 16-yard run, Alejandro Mata kick (Drive: 3 plays, 36 yards, 1:16; Colorado 7–0)
- (8:26) ARIZ – DJ Williams 11-yard run, Tyler Loop kick (Drive: 6 plays, 75 yards, 2:48; Tied 7–7)
- (0:14) COLO – Jimmy Horn Jr. 20-yard pass from Shedeur Sanders, Alejandro Mata kick (Drive: 8 plays, 48 yards, 3:04; Colorado 14–7)

Second quarter

- (8:33) ARIZ – Jacob Cowing 3-yard pass from Noah Fifita, Tyler Loop kick (Drive: 5 plays, 72 yards, 2:23; Tied 14–14)
- (3:13) COLO – Sy'veon Wilkerson 1-yard run, Alejandro Mata kick (Drive: 10 plays, 75 yards, 5:20; Colorado 21–14)
- (1:32) ARIZ - Tyler Loop 52-yard field goal (Drive: 6 plays, 25 yards, 1:31; Colorado 21-17)
- (0:00) COLO - Alejandro Mata 39-yard field goal (Drive: 7 plays, 54 yards, 1:32; Colorado 24-17)

Third quarter

- (12:41) ARIZ – Tetairoa McMillan 2-yard pass from Noah Fifita, Tyler Loop kick (Drive: 5 plays, 75 yards, 2:19; Tied 24–24)
- (3:22) COLO – Michael Harrison 7-yard pass from Shedeur Sanders, Alejandro Mata kick (Drive: 8 plays, 35 yards, 3:47; Colorado 31–24)

Fourth quarter

- (14:55) ARIZ – DJ Williams 7-yard run, Tyler Loop kick (Drive: 6 plays, 75 yards, 3:27; Tied 31–31)
- (0:00) ARIZ - Tyler Loop 24-yard field goal (Drive: 11 plays, 67 yards, 4:57; Arizona 34-31)

Statistics	ARIZ	COLO
First downs	22	18
Total yards	421	339
Rushing yards	27–207	30–77
Passing yards	214	262
Passing: Comp–Att–Int	21–35–0	22–35–0
Time of possession	28:12	31:48

Team	Category	Player	Statistics
Arizona	Passing	Noah Fifita	21/35, 214 yards, 2 TD
Arizona	Rushing	Jonah Coleman	11 carries, 179 yards
Arizona	Receiving	Tetairoa McMillan	9 receptions, 107 yards, TD
Colorado	Passing	Shedeur Sanders	22/35, 262 yards, 2 TD
Colorado	Rushing	Shedeur Sanders	13 carries, 29 yards, TD
Colorado	Receiving	Xavier Weaver	5 receptions, 84 yards

=== vs No. 22 Utah ===
No. 22 Utah Utes (7–3) vs No. 17 Arizona Wildcats (7–3) – Game summary

Quarter	1	2	3	4	Total
No. 22 Utes	0	7	3	8	18
No. 17 Wildcats	21	7	0	14	42

at Arizona Stadium • Tucson, AZ

- Date: November 18, 2023
- Game time: 12:30 p.m.
- Game weather: Cloudy, 71 °F (22 °C)
- Game attendance: 50,800
- Referee: Jeff Dahle
- TV announcers (Pac-12 Network): Ted Robinson (play-by-play), Yogi Roth (analyst)

Game information

First quarter

- (10:33) ARIZ – Michael Wiley 21-yard pass from Tetairoa McMillan, Tyler Loop kick (Drive: 8 plays, 75 yards, 4:27; Arizona 7–0)
- (8:32) ARIZ – Anthony Ward 2-yard blocked punt return, Tyler Loop kick (Arizona 14–0)
- (4:06) ARIZ – Montana Lemonious-Craig 32-yard pass from Noah Fifita, Tyler Loop kick (Drive: 6 plays, 80 yards, 2:55; Arizona 21–0)

Second quarter

- (14:53) ARIZ – Michael Wiley 31-yard pass from Noah Fifita, Tyler Loop kick (Drive: 6 plays, 72 yards, 2:19; Arizona 28–0)
- (0:52) UTAH – Devaughn Vele 20-yard pass from Bryson Barnes, Cole Becker kick (Drive: 10 plays, 92 yards, 4:46; Arizona 28–7)

Third quarter

- (10:00) UTAH – Cole Becker 36-yard field goal (Drive: 12 plays, 57 yards, 5:00; Arizona 28–10)

Fourth quarter

- (7:57) ARIZ – Jonah Coleman 1-yard run, Tyler Loop kick (Drive: 7 plays, 61 yards, 3:25; Arizona 35–10)
- (0:43) UTAH – Munir McClain 2-yard pass from Bryson Barnes, Bryson Barnes run for two-point conversion (Drive: 14 plays, 88 yards, 2:44; Arizona 35–18)
- (0:32) ARIZ – Tetairoa McMillan 51-yard pass from Jayden de Laura, Tyler Loop kick (Drive: 1 play, 46 yards, 0:09; Arizona 42–18)

Statistics	UTAH	ARIZ
First downs	26	21
Total yards	438	443
Rushing yards	37–118	24–118
Passing yards	320	325
Passing: Comp–Att–Int	31–53–2	25–33–0
Time of possession	35:34	24:26

Team	Category	Player	Statistics
Utah	Passing	Bryson Barnes	31/53, 320 yards, 2 TD, 2 INT
Utah	Rushing	Ja'Quinden Jackson	10 carries, 47 yards
Utah	Receiving	Devaughn Vele	9 receptions, 111 yards, TD
Arizona	Passing	Noah Fifita	22/30, 253 yards, 2 TD
Arizona	Rushing	Jonah Coleman	14 carries, 90 yards, TD
Arizona	Receiving	Tetairoa McMillan	8 receptions, 116 yards, TD

=== at Arizona State ===
No. 15 Arizona Wildcats (8–3) at Arizona State Sun Devils (3–8) – Game summary

Quarter	1	2	3	4	Total
No. 15 Wildcats	10	28	14	7	59
Sun Devils	7	0	8	8	23

at Mountain America Stadium • Tempe, AZ

- Date: November 25, 2023
- Game time: 1:30 p.m.
- Game weather: Sunny, 66 °F (19 °C)
- Game attendance: 53,414
- Referee: Mark Duddy
- TV announcers (ESPN): Mark Jones (play-by-play), Louis Riddick (analyst), Quint Kessenich (sideline reporter)

Game information

First quarter

- (11:57) ARIZ – Tyler Loop 35-yard field goal (Drive: 8 plays, 57 yards, 3:03; Arizona 3–0)
- (7:53) ASU – Cam Skattebo 4-yard run, Dario Longhetto kick (Drive: 7 plays, 75 yards, 4:04; Arizona State 7–3)
- (3:45) ARIZ – Tanner McLachlan 3-yard pass from Noah Fifita, Tyler Loop kick (Drive: 9 plays, 75 yards, 4:08; Arizona 10–7)

Second quarter

- (13:26) ARIZ – Jonah Coleman 4-yard run, Tyler Loop kick (Drive: 2 plays, 61 yards, 0:44; Arizona 17–7)
- (7:16) ARIZ – Michael Wiley 22-yard run, Tyler Loop kick (Drive: 6 plays, 77 yards, 2:40; Arizona 24–7)
- (2:12) ARIZ – Michael Wiley 1-yard run, Tyler Loop kick (Drive: 8 plays, 60 yards, 2:56; Arizona 31–7)
- (0:42) ARIZ – Michael Wiley 21-yard pass from Noah Fifita, Tyler Loop kick (Drive: 4 plays, 70 yards, 0:35; Arizona 38–7)

Third quarter

- (13:29) ARIZ – Tanner McLachlan 8-yard pass from Noah Fifita, Tyler Loop kick (Drive: 2 plays, 9 yards, 0:39; Arizona 45–7)
- (9:08) ARIZ – Tetairoa McMillan 50-yard pass from Noah Fifita, Tyler Loop kick (Drive: 3 plays, 53 yards, 1:11; Arizona 52–7)
- (4:04) ASU – Jalin Conyers 1-yard run, Jalin Conyers run for two-point conversion (Drive: 12 plays, 75 yards, 5:04; Arizona 52–15)

Fourth quarter

- (4:04) ASU – Troy Omeire 31-yard pass from Jaden Rashada, DeCarlos Brooks run for two-point conversion (Drive: 6 plays, 55 yards, 2:02; Arizona 52–23)
- (3:54) ARIZ – Jacob Cowing 1-yard pass from Noah Fifita, Tyler Loop kick (Drive: 7 plays, 39 yards, 4:36; Arizona 59–23)

Statistics	ARIZ	ASU
First downs	24	28
Total yards	619	306
Rushing yards	25–92	42–224
Passing yards	527	82
Passing: Comp–Att–Int	30–41–1	10–23–2
Time of possession	30:03	29:57

Team	Category	Player	Statistics
Arizona	Passing	Noah Fifita	30/41, 527 yards, 5 TD, INT
Arizona	Rushing	Michael Wiley	12 carries, 66 yards, 2 TD
Arizona	Receiving	Tetairoa McMillan	11 receptions, 266 yards, TD
Arizona State	Passing	Jaden Rashada	10/22, 82 yards, TD, 2 INT
Arizona State	Rushing	Cameron Skattebo	17 carries, 108 yards, TD
Arizona State	Receiving	Troy Omeire	3 receptions, 38 yards, TD

This was the Wildcats' first win over the Sun Devils in Tempe since 2011. As well as their first time beating the Sun Devils in consecutive seasons since the 2008 and 2009 seasons.

=== vs Oklahoma (Alamo Bowl) ===
No. 14 Arizona Wildcats (9–3) vs No. 12 Oklahoma Sooners (10–2) – Game summary
(2023 Valero Alamo Bowl)

Quarter	1	2	3	4	Total
No. 14 Wildcats	10	3	8	17	38
No. 12 Sooners	0	14	10	0	24

at Alamodome • San Antonio, TX

- Date: December 28, 2023
- Game time: 7:15 p.m.
- Game weather: None (indoor stadium)
- Game attendance: 55,853
- Referee: David Smith
- TV announcers (ESPN): Tom Hart (play-by-play), Jordan Rodgers (analyst) & Cole Cubelic (sideline)

Game information

First quarter

- (10:57) ARIZ – Tyler Loop 39-yard field goal (Drive: 8 plays, 57 yards, 3:56; Arizona 3–0)
- (10:33) ARIZ – Jacob Cowing 35-yard pass from Noah Fifita, Tyler Loop kick (Drive: 1 play, 35 yards, 0:08; Arizona 10–0)

Second quarter

- (13:05) ARIZ – Tyler Loop 38-yard field goal (Drive: 12 plays, 45 yards, 4:24; Arizona 13–0)
- (9:42) OKLA – Gavin Sawchuk 18-yard run, Zach Schmit kick (Drive: 10 plays, 75 yards, 3:23; Arizona 13–7)
- (2:53) OKLA – Nic Anderson 10-yard pass from Jackson Arnold, Zach Schmit kick (Drive: 6 plays, 92 yards, 2:39; Oklahoma 14–13)

Third quarter

- (14:29) OKLA – Brenen Thompson 63-yard pass from Jackson Arnold, Zach Schmit kick (Drive: 2 plays, 75 yards, 0:31; Oklahoma 21–13)
- (6:59) OKLA – Zach Schmit 22-yard field goal (Drive: 12 plays, 84 yards, 4:12; Oklahoma 24–13)
- (0:02) ARIZ – Gunner Maldonado 87-yard fumble return, Noah Fifita two-point pass to Montana Lemonious-Craig (Oklahoma 24–21)

Fourth quarter

- (12:49) ARIZ – Tyler Loop 37-yard field goal (Drive: 4 plays, -9 yards, 2:02; Tied 24–24)
- (5:28) ARIZ – Jacob Cowing 57-yard pass from Noah Fifita, Tyler Loop kick (Drive: 8 plays, 95 yards, 4:27; Arizona 31–24)
- (2:56) ARIZ – D.J. Williams 19-yard run, Tyler Loop kick (Drive: 2 plays, 19 yards, 0:47; Arizona 38–24)

Statistics	ARIZ	OKLA
First downs	17	23
Total yards	383	562
Rushing yards	29–26	34–201
Passing yards	354	361
Passing: Comp–Att–Int	24–38–1	26–45–3
Time of possession	31:25	28:35

Team	Category	Player	Statistics
Arizona	Passing	Noah Fifita	24/38, 354 yards, 2 TD, INT
Arizona	Rushing	D.J. Williams	6 carries, 28 yards, TD
Arizona	Receiving	Tetairoa McMillan	10 receptions, 160 yards
Oklahoma	Passing	Jackson Arnold	26/45, 361 yards, 2 TD, 3 INT
Oklahoma	Rushing	Gavin Sawchuk	15 carries, 135 yards, TD
Oklahoma	Receiving	Brenen Thompson	2 receptions, 83 yards, TD

Wide receiver Jacob Cowing was named Offensive MVP.

Safety Gunner Maldonado was named Defensive MVP.

== Awards and honors ==
Pac-12 Weekly Honors
Date	Player	Position	Award	Ref.
Week 6	Noah Fifita	QB	Freshman of the Week	
Week 7	Noah Fifita	QB	Freshman of the Week	
Week 9	Noah Fifita	QB	Freshman of the Week	
Week 10	Noah Fifita	QB	Freshman of the Week	
Week 11	Tyler Loop	PK	Special Teams Player of the Week	
Week 13	Tetairoa McMillan	WR	Offensive Player of the Week	
Week 13	Noah Fifita	QB	Freshman of the Week	

National Weekly Honors
Date	Player	Position	Award

=== All-Pac 12 ===
All-Pac-12
Player	Position	1st/2nd team
Jordan Morgan	OL	1st
Jacob Manu	LB	1st
Tetairoa McMillan	WR	2nd
Tyler Loop	PK	2nd
Jonah Coleman	RB	HM
Jacob Cowing	WR	HM
Tacario Davis	DB	HM
Tanner McLachlan	TE	HM
Ephesians Prysock	DB	HM
Jonah Savaiinaea	OL	HM
Treydan Stukes	DB	HM
Taylor Upshaw	DL	HM
HM = Honorable mention. Source:

== Rankings ==
Ranking movements Legend: ██ Increase in ranking ██ Decrease in ranking — = Not ranked RV = Received votes
	Week															
Poll	Pre	1	2	3	4	5	6	7	8	9	10	11	12	13	14	Final
AP	—	—	—	—	—	—	—	—	—	RV	23	19	16	14	14	11
Coaches	RV	RV	—	—	—	—	—	RV	RV	RV	24	22	16	15	14	11
CFP	Not released									—	21	17	15	15	14	Not released
