= Jonah Coleman =

American football player (born 2003)

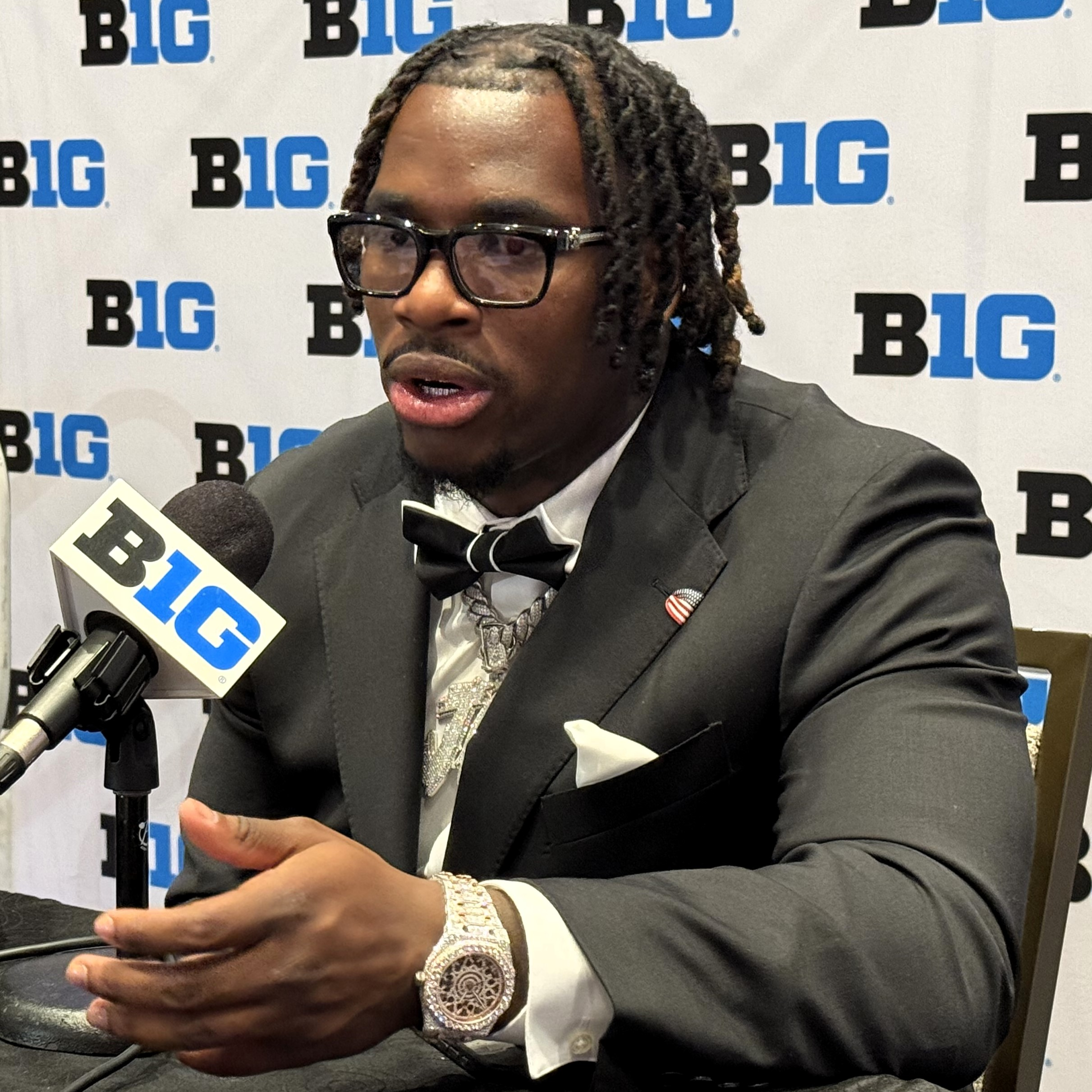
- Coleman at 2025 Big Ten Media Days

No. 20 – Denver Broncos
- Position: Running back
- Roster status: Active

Personal information
- Born: August 20, 2003 (age 23); Stockton, California, U.S.
- Listed height: 5 ft 8 in (1.73 m)
- Listed weight: 220 lb (100 kg)

Career information
- High school: Lincoln (Stockton)
- College: Arizona (2022–2023); Washington (2024–2025)
- NFL draft: 2026: 4th round, 108th overall pick

Career history
- Denver Broncos (2026–present)

Awards and highlights
- Third-team All-Big Ten (2024)

Career NFL statistics as of Week 10, 2026
- Rushing yards: 191
- Rushing average: 4.1
- Rushing touchdowns: 3
- Receptions: 13
- Receiving yards: 128
- Stats at Pro Football Reference

Jonah Coleman (born August 20, 2003) is an American professional football running back for the Denver Broncos of the National Football League (NFL). He played college football for the Arizona Wildcats and Washington Huskies. Coleman was selected by the Broncos in the fourth round of the 2026 NFL draft.

== Early life ==
Coleman attended Lincoln High School in Stockton, California. During his high school career, he rushed for 3,319 yards and 58 touchdowns on 334 carries. He committed to the University of Arizona to play college football.

== College career ==
As a true freshman at Arizona in 2022, Coleman played in 12 games with two starts and had 372 yards on 75 carries with four touchdowns. He played in 13 games in 2023 and had 871 yards on 128 carries with five touchdowns. After the season, Coleman entered the transfer portal and transferred to the University of Washington.

=== Statistics ===
Year	Team	GP	Rushing				Receiving			
Year	Team	GP	Att	Yds	Avg	TD	Rec	Yds	Avg	TD
2022	Arizona	12	75	372	5.0	4	8	24	3.0	0
2023	Arizona	13	128	871	6.8	5	25	283	11.3	1
2024	Washington	13	193	1,053	5.5	10	23	177	7.7	0
2025	Washington	12	156	758	4.9	15	31	354	11.4	2
Career		50	552	3,054	5.5	34	87	838	9.6	3

== Professional career ==
Pre-draft measurables
Height	Weight	Arm length	Hand span	Wingspan	Bench press
5 ft 8 1/8 in (1.73 m)	220 lb (100 kg)	28 7/8 in (0.73 m)	9 1/8 in (0.23 m)	5 ft 11 1/8 in (1.81 m)	22 reps
All values from NFL Combine

Coleman was selected by the Denver Broncos in the fourth round (108th overall) of the 2026 NFL draft. The Broncos previously traded Devaughn Vele to the New Orleans Saints to receive the selection. On May 20, 2026, Coleman signed his four-year rookie contract. Coleman scored his first career touchdown in Week 2 against the Jacksonville Jaguars, giving the Broncos a seven-point lead in the fourth quarter. Denver would go on to win the game, 20–13. During the game, Coleman suffered a sprained ankle. He was later placed on injured reserve on September 26. He was activated from injured reserve on October 24.

== Personal life ==
Coleman's father, Jamon, is a former member of the Bloods gang. At one point during Coleman's childhood, a group of armed Crips accosted him and his father at a football practice. Coleman's mother, Marcella Johnson, was serving time in jail for welfare fraud while pregnant with him, and he was born shortly after she was released.
