= Montana Lemonious-Craig =

American football player (born 2002)

Profile
- Position: Wide receiver

Personal information
- Born: July 29, 2002 (age 24); Inglewood, California, U.S.
- Listed height: 6 ft 2 in (1.88 m)
- Listed weight: 194 lb (88 kg)

Career information
- High school: Inglewood
- College: Colorado (2020–2022); Arizona (2023–2024)
- NFL draft: 2025: undrafted

Career history
- Pittsburgh Steelers (2025)*
- * Offseason or practice squad member only
- Stats at Pro Football Reference

Montana-George Eugene Lemonious-Craig (born July 29, 2002) is an American professional football wide receiver. He played college football for the Colorado Buffaloes and Arizona Wildcats.

== Early life ==
Lemonious-Craig grew up in Inglewood, California, and attended Inglewood High School. As a senior, he had 46 receptions for 1,289 yards and 23 touchdowns along with two rushes for 22 yards for 1,314 from scrimmage. He committed to play college football at Colorado.

== College career ==
=== Colorado ===
During his true freshman season, Lemonious-Craig appeared in three games and caught his first career pass in the Alamo Bowl. The following season, he appeared in ten games before being limited by injuries during the final two games of the season. During 2022, he appeared in all 12 games and lead the Buffaloes in receptions. On April 24, 2023, Lemonious-Craig entered the transfer portal.

=== Arizona ===
On May 20, 2023, Lemonious-Craig transferred to Arizona. During the 2023 season, he appeared in every game for the Wildcats and recorded 28 receptions for 296 yards and three touchdowns, including five catches for 67 yards against Colorado. In 2024, he missed one game, but managed to haul in 17 passes for 172 yards and one touchdown.

=== College statistics ===
| Year | Team | GP | Receiving | | | | |
| Year | Team | GP | Rec | Yds | Avg | Lng | TD |
|---|---|---|---|---|---|---|---|
| 2020 | Colorado | 3 | 1 | 15 | 15.0 | 15 | 0 |
| 2021 | Colorado | 10 | 10 | 123 | 12.3 | 25 | 2 |
| 2022 | Colorado | 12 | 23 | 359 | 15.6 | 69 | 3 |
| 2023 | Arizona | 13 | 28 | 296 | 10.6 | 39 | 3 |
| 2024 | Arizona | 11 | 17 | 172 | 10.1 | 20 | 1 |
| Career | | 47 | 79 | 965 | 12.2 | 69 | 9 |

== Professional career ==
Pre-draft measurables
| Height | Weight | Arm length | Hand span | 40-yard dash | 10-yard split | 20-yard split | 20-yard shuttle | Vertical jump | Broad jump | Bench press |
|---|---|---|---|---|---|---|---|---|---|---|
| 6 ft 1 in (1.85 m) | 189 lb (86 kg) | 30 1/8 in (0.77 m) | 9 1/8 in (0.23 m) | 4.57 s | 1.57 s | 2.66 s | 4.34 s | 35.0 in (0.89 m) | 9 ft 9 in (2.97 m) | 14 reps |
All values from Pro Day

=== Pittsburgh Steelers ===
On May 27, 2025, Lemonious-Craig was signed by the Pittsburgh Steelers as an undrafted free agent.
