= Anterio Thompson =

American football player (born 2002)

No. 98 – Atlanta Falcons
- Position: Defensive tackle
- Roster status: Non-football injury

Personal information
- Born: October 29, 2002 (age 24); Madison, Wisconsin, U.S.
- Listed height: 6 ft 2 in (1.88 m)
- Listed weight: 306 lb (139 kg)

Career information
- High school: Hempstead (Dubuque, Iowa)
- College: Iowa Western (2022); Iowa (2023); Western Michigan (2024); Washington (2025)
- NFL draft: 2026: 6th round, 208th overall pick

Career history
- Atlanta Falcons (2026–present)
- Stats at Pro Football Reference

Anterio Thompson (born October 29, 2002) is an American professional football defensive tackle for the Atlanta Falcons of the National Football League (NFL). He played college football for the Iowa Western Reivers, the Iowa Hawkeyes, the Western Michigan Broncos and the Washington Huskies. Thompson was selected by the Falcons in the sixth round of the 2026 NFL draft.

== Early life ==
Thompson is the son of Tyshaun Thompson and Areal Greenwood and grew up in Madison, Wisconsin. He primarily focused on basketball at Hempstead High School. In his senior year, Thompson joined the football team as a defensive lineman and earned all-region honors with 39 tackles, seven tackles for loss and one sack. He committed to play college football at Iowa Western Community College in June 2021.

== College career ==
Thompson began his college career at Iowa Western Community College. In his freshman season in 2022, he played in 12 games and had 32 tackles and six sacks, helping the team win a junior college title. Thompson transferred to Iowa after the season. He appeared in seven games as a sophomore, and had one tackle and two blocked punts, one returned for a safety. Thompson transferred to Western Michigan for his junior season and recorded 32 tackles in 12 games including 1.5 tackles for a loss and a sack as well as batting down two passes and a blocked kick. In his senior season, Thompson transferred again to Washington. He had three starts in 12 games and tallied 30 tackles including 2.5 tackles for a loss, 1.5 sacks and batted two passes. Thompson initially sought to get a waiver to play in 2026 but ultimately opted to focus on the NFL.

== Professional career ==
Pre-draft measurables
Height	Weight	Arm length	Hand span	Wingspan	40-yard dash	10-yard split	20-yard split	20-yard shuttle	Three-cone drill	Vertical jump	Broad jump	Bench press
6 ft 1 7/8 in (1.88 m)	306 lb (139 kg)	33 1/2 in (0.85 m)	10 in (0.25 m)	6 ft 8 5/8 in (2.05 m)	4.75 s	1.74 s	2.70 s	4.38 s	7.80 s	29.5 in (0.75 m)	9 ft 6 in (2.90 m)	30 reps
All values from Pro Day

Thompson was selected by the Atlanta Falcons in the sixth round with the 208th overall pick in the 2026 NFL draft.
