= Alex McLaughlin =

American football player

No. 7 – Washington Huskies
- Position: Safety
- Class: Senior

Personal information
- Born: Philadelphia, Pennsylvania, U.S.
- Listed height: 6 ft 2 in (1.88 m)
- Listed weight: 205 lb (93 kg)

Career information
- High school: Hamilton (Chandler, Arizona)
- College: Northern Arizona (2023–2024); Washington (2025–present)
- Stats at ESPN

Alex McLaughlin is an American college football safety for the Washington Huskies. He previously played for the Northern Arizona Lumberjacks.

== Early life ==
McLaughlin attended Hamilton High School in Chandler, Arizona. A linebacker in high school, he had 107 tackles, three interceptions and eight sacks as a senior. He committed to Northern Arizona University to play college football.

== College career ==
As a freshman at Northern Arizona in 2023, McLaughlin started all 10 games he played in and led the team with 71 tackles and four interceptions. He played in all 13 games in 2024, recording 96 tackles, two interceptions and 5.5 sacks. Afte the season, McLaughlin entered the transfer portal and committed to the University of Washington. In his first season at Washington in 2025, he started all 13 games and had 94 tackles and two interceptions with one returned for a touchdown. McLaughlin returned to Washington for his senior year in 2026.
