= Jacob Manu =

American football player (born 2003)

No. 9 – Washington Huskies
- Position: Linebacker
- Class: Senior

Personal information
- Born: January 4, 2003 (age 23)
- Listed height: 5 ft 9 in (1.75 m)
- Listed weight: 222 lb (101 kg)

Career information
- High school: Servite (Anaheim, California)
- College: Arizona (2022–2024); Washington (2025–present)

Awards and highlights
- First-team All-Pac-12 (2023)
- Stats at ESPN

Jacob Manu (born January 4, 2003) is an American college football linebacker for the Washington Huskies. He previously played for the Arizona Wildcats.

== Early life ==
Manu attended Servite High School in Anaheim, California. Rated as a three-star recruit, he committed to play college football for the Arizona Wildcats.

== College career ==
=== Arizona ===
In week 12 of the 2022 season, Manu was named the Pac-12 Conference freshman of the week after notching ten tackles and a pass deflection in an upset win over #12 UCLA. He finished the season with 54 tackles, with four being for a loss, a sack, and a pass deflection. Heading into the 2023 season, Manu was named a team captain. That season, he recorded 116 tackles, with nine and a half being for a loss, six and a half sacks, and an interception, en route to being named first-team all-Pac-12.

On December 8, 2024, Manu announced that he would enter the NCAA transfer portal.

=== Washington ===
On December 20, 2024, Manu announced that he would transfer to Washington.
