= Kevin Cummings =

American football player and coach (born 1990)

Washington Huskies
- Title: Wide receivers coach

Personal information
- Born: December 1, 1990 (age 35); Los Angeles, California, U.S.
- Listed height: 6 ft 1 in (1.85 m)
- Listed weight: 185 lb (84 kg)

Career information
- High school: Encino (CA) Crespi Carmelite
- College: Oregon State
- NFL draft: 2014: undrafted

Career history

Playing
- Edmonton Eskimos (2014)*; Portland Thunder (2014)
- * Offseason or practice squad member only

Coaching
- Oregon State (2014–2016) Offensive quality control assistant; San Jose State (2017–2020) Wide receivers coach; Arizona (2021–2023) Wide receivers coach; Washington (2024–present) Wide receivers coach

Career AFL statistics
- Receptions: 2
- Receiving yards: 16
- Receiving touchdowns: 1
- Stats at ArenaFan.com

Kevin Cummings
Medal record

Men's American football

Representing United States

World Championship
Gold medal – first place	2015 USA	Team competition

Kevin Cummings (born December 1, 1990) is an American football coach who is currently the wide receivers coach for the Washington Huskies football team. He played college football at Oregon State University.

== Playing career ==
=== College ===
Cummings was a wide receiver and special teams player on the Oregon State teams from 2010 to 2013.

=== Professional ===
Pre-draft measurables
Height	Weight	Arm length	Hand span	40-yard dash	10-yard split	20-yard split	20-yard shuttle	Three-cone drill	Vertical jump	Broad jump	Bench press
6 ft 1 in (1.85 m)	184 lb (83 kg)	30 5/8 in (0.78 m)	8 3/4 in (0.22 m)	4.48 s	1.58 s	2.61 s	4.24 s	6.98 s	34.5 in (0.88 m)	9 ft 2 in (2.79 m)	13 reps
All values from Pro Day

After college, Cummings participated in the rookie mini-camp with the San Francisco 49ers. He split the 2014 season with the Ottawa Redblacks and Edmonton Eskimos of the Canadian Football League and the Portland Thunder of the Arena Football League.

== Coaching career ==
From 2014 to 2017, he worked in Offensive Quality Control at Oregon State.

In 2017, he followed OSU colleague Brent Brennan to San Jose State to become the wide receivers coach.

He joined the University of Arizona's coaching staff as wide receivers coach in 2021.

Jedd Fisch was appointed head coach at University of Washington and Cummings followed the head coach. He was announced as the wide receiver coach on January 17, 2024
