= Jimmie Dougherty =

American football player and coach (born 1978)

Seattle Seahawks
- Title: Offensive assistant

Personal information
- Born: September 9, 1978 (age 48); Peoria, Illinois, U.S.

Career information
- Position: Quarterback
- College: Missouri (1997–2001)

Career history
- Illinois Wesleyan (2002–2003) Defensive backs coach; San Diego (2004) Wide receivers coach; San Diego (2005) Tight ends coach; San Diego (2006) Quarterbacks coach; San Diego (2007) Quarterbacks coach & pass game coordinator; San Diego (2008) Offensive coordinator & quarterbacks coach; Washington (2009–2012) Wide receivers coach & pass game coordinator; San Jose State (2013) Offensive coordinator & quarterbacks coach; San Jose State (2014) Assistant head coach, offensive coordinator & quarterbacks coach; San Jose State (2015) Assistant head coach, pass game coordinator & wide receivers coach; Michigan (2016) Offensive analyst; UCLA (2017–2020) Wide receivers coach; Arizona (2021–2023) Quarterbacks coach & pass game coordinator; Washington (2024) Quarterbacks coach & pass game coordinator; Washington (2025) Offensive coordinator & quarterbacks coach; Seattle Seahawks (2026–present) Offensive assistant

James Michael Dougherty (born September 9, 1978) is an American football coach who is currently an offensive assistant for the Seattle Seahawks of the National Football League (NFL). He was most recently the offensive coordinator and quarterbacks for the University of Washington. Prior to that, he was the quarterbacks coach and pass game coordinator at Arizona.

== Early life ==
Dougherty was born on September 9, 1978, in Peoria, Illinois. He attended Edwardsville High School in Edwardsville, Illinois, where he played for his father, Tim Dougherty, and earned all-state honors as a quarterback. Dougherty played college football at Missouri from 1997 to 2001. In 2002, he earned a bachelor's degree in Interdisciplinary Studies in Missouri, and he went on to attain a master's degree in Sport Management from Illinois State University in 2004.

== Coaching career ==
=== Illinois Wesleyan ===
Dougherty began his coaching career as the defensive backs coach at Illinois Wesleyan University, where he spent the 2002 and 2003 seasons.

=== San Diego ===
After earning his master's degree from Illinois State in 2004, Dougherty embarked on a five-year tenure at the University of San Diego. He coached the team's wide receivers in the 2004 season. One of the receivers Dougherty coached was All-American, team MVP, and later Philadelphia Eagles signee Michael Gasperson. Dougherty also mentored Adam Hannula, who set school receiving records.

In the 2005 season, Dougherty coached the Toreros' tight ends; senior tight end Matt Koller earned All-Pioneer League honors during this season.

The following two seasons, Dougherty served as the Toreros' passing game coordinator and quarterbacks coach. He mentored Josh Johnson, who became USD's all-time leading passer and was selected by the Tampa Bay Buccaneers in the 2008 NFL draft. In the 2007 season, Johnson amassed 43 passing touchdowns and just one interception in the 2007 season and finished third in voting for Walter Payton Award, which is awarded to the nation's top Football Championship Subdivision (FCS) player. Johnson also set a new all-time NCAA record with a career passing efficiency rating of 176.7. Johnson has spent 14 seasons as a professional football player, currently as a backup quarterback to Lamar Jackson with the Baltimore Ravens.

In 2008, Dougherty was promoted to offensive coordinator. He oversaw an offense that scored an average of 35.3 points per game.

=== Washington ===
From 2009 to 2012, Dougherty served as the wide receivers coach for the Washington Huskies. Dougherty tutored four of the ten all-time receiving leaders in school history: Jaydon Mickens, Jermaine Kearse, Kasen Williams, and Devin Aguilar. Kearse went on to start for the Seattle Seahawks in the 2013 season, in which the Seahawks won Super Bowl XLVIII. Dougherty was given the additional title of passing game coordinator in the 2012 season. The Huskies played in a bowl game in each of Dougherty's last three seasons with the program.

=== San Jose State ===
Dougherty spent the 2013, 2014, and 2015 seasons with the San Jose State Spartans.

In 2013, Dougherty, who was serving as the offensive coordinator and quarterbacks coach, presided over an offense that ranked sixth in the country in passing offense, with 355.9 passing yards per game, and 15th in the country in total offense per game, with 493.3 yards. Quarterback David Fales, who went on to be selected by the Chicago Bears in the 2014 NFL draft, passed for over 4,000 yards that season. In the season finale, San Jose State handed Fresno State its sole regular-season loss with a 62–52 victory. Fales completed 37 of 45 passes for 545 yards and six touchdowns in the win. Dougherty was nominated for the Frank Broyles Award, which is awarded to the top Football Bowl Subdivision assistant in the country.

Dougherty added the title of assistant head coach in the 2014 season, during which he mentored quarterback Joe Gray, who tied a Mountain West Conference record for consecutive 300-yard passing outings. However, the Spartans stumbled to a 3–9 record that season. In his third and final season with the Spartans, Dougherty served as passing game coordinator and wide receivers coach; the 2015 Spartans offense ranked eighth in the FBS for passing completion percentage (67.5%), 12th in third-down conversion percentage (47.8%), and 18th in red zone offense (88.9%).

=== Michigan ===
In the 2016 season, Dougherty served as an offensive analyst for the Michigan Wolverines, contributing to an offense that averaged 41.0 points per game, which ranked 12th in the FBS.

=== UCLA ===
In December 2016, Dougherty accepted an offer to become the wide receivers coach for the Oregon Ducks. However, after just seven weeks on the job, Dougherty accepted an offer to become the wide receivers coach and passing game coordinator for the UCLA Bruins, joining newly minted offensive coordinator Jedd Fisch, with whom Dougherty had worked at Michigan.

In the 2017 season, with Dougherty serving as the pass game coordinator, the Bruins' offense set a new record for passing yards in a season, with 4,478. Jordan Lasley, who played on the 2017 UCLA team, was selected by the Baltimore Ravens in the 2018 NFL draft. In 2018, the Bruins' leading wide receiver, Theo Howard, made 51 catches for 677 yards and did not drop a single pass all season. In 2019—Dougherty's third season at UCLA—redshirt freshman Kyle Philips finished the season with the most catches by a freshman receiver in UCLA history and became the first Bruin in 18 years to lead the team in receptions as a freshman.

=== Seattle Seahawks ===
On March 28, 2026, the Seattle Seahawks hired Dougherty to serve as an offensive assistant.
