= 2022 Arizona Wildcats football team =

American college football season

2022 Arizona Wildcats football
- Conference: Pac-12 Conference
- Record: 5–7 (3–6 Pac-12)
- Head coach: Jedd Fisch (2nd season)
- Offensive coordinator: Brennan Carroll (2nd season)
- Offensive scheme: Pro-style
- Defensive coordinator: Johnny Nansen (1st season)
- Base defense: 4–3
- Home stadium: Arizona Stadium

2022 Pac-12 Conference football standings
	Conf.			Overall
Team	W		L	W		L
No. 12 USC y	8	–	1	11	–	3
No. 10 Utah y$	7	–	2	10	–	4
No. 8 Washington	7	–	2	11	–	2
No. 15 Oregon	7	–	2	10	–	3
No. 17 Oregon State	6	–	3	10	–	3
No. 21 UCLA	6	–	3	9	–	4
Washington State	4	–	5	7	–	6
Arizona	3	–	6	5	–	7
California	2	–	7	4	–	8
Arizona State†	1	–	7	1	–	9
Stanford	1	–	8	3	–	9
Colorado	1	–	8	1	–	11
Championship: Utah 47, USC 24
$ – Conference champion; y – Championship game participant; Rankings from AP Poll

The 2022 Arizona Wildcats football team represented the University of Arizona during the 2022 NCAA Division I FBS football season. They were led by second-year head coach Jedd Fisch, and played their home games at Arizona Stadium in Tucson, Arizona. It was the Wildcats' 123rd season overall and 44th as a member of the Pac-12 Conference. The Wildcats finished 5–7 overall (3–6 in conference play) and failed to qualify for a bowl game.

== Offseason ==
=== Position key ===
Positions key
Offense	Defense	Special teams
QB — Quarterback; RB — Running back; FB — Fullback; WR — Wide receiver; TE — Tight end; OL — Offensive lineman; T — Tackle; G — Guard; C — Center	DL — Defensive lineman; DT — Defensive tackle (Note: Includes nose tackle (NT)); DE — Defensive end; EDGE — Edge rusher; LB — Linebacker (Note: Includes middle linebacker (MLB/MIKE), weakside linebacker (WILL), strongside linebacker (SAM), off-ball linebacker, and outside linebacker (OLB)); DB — Defensive back; CB — Cornerback; S — Safety (Note: Includes free safety (FS) and strong safety (SS))	K — Kicker (Note: Also known as a placekicker (PK)); P — Punter; LS — Long snapper; RS — Return specialist (Note: Includes kickoff and punt returners)

=== Team departures ===
Over the course of the off-season, Arizona lost 48 total players. 18 players graduated, while the other 28 entered the transfer portal.

2022 Arizona offseason departures
Name	Number	Pos.	Height	Weight	Year	Hometown	Notes
Stanley Berryhill	#1	WR	5'11	190	(redshirt) Junior	Tucson, AZ	Declared for 2022 NFL draft
Rashie Hodge Jr.	#35	LB	5'11	214	Junior	Phoenix, AZ	Declared for 2022 NFL draft
Leevel Tatum III	#97	DL	6'1	284	Senior	Fresno, CA	Graduated/Declared for 2022 NFL draft
Mohamed Diallo	#26	DL	6'4	306	(redshirt) Senior	Toronto, CAN	Graduated/Declared for 2022 NFL draft
Trevon Mason	#90	DL	6'5	305	Graduated Student	Arlington, TX	Graduated/Declared for 2022 NFL draft
Lucas Havrisik	#43	PK	6'2	188	Graduated Student	Riverside, CA	Graduated/Declared for 2022 NFL draft
Christian Young	#5	DB	6'3	217	Senior	Houston, TX	Graduated
Anthony Pandy	#8	LB	6'1	228	Graduated Student	Carson, CA	Graduated
Luke Ashworth	#13	QB	6'2	208	Senior	Phoenix, AZ	Graduated
Thomas Reid III	#16	WR	6'3	221	Graduated Student	Chesapeake, VA	Graduated
Jacob Meeker-Hackett	#32	PK	6'0	215	Graduated Student	Tucson, AZ	Graduated
Donte Smith	#38	LB	5'10	222	RS senior	Round Rock, TX	Graduated
Clay Markoff	#44	RB	5'10	239	Graduated Student	Olympia, WA	Graduated
Josh McCauley	#50	OL	6'4	310	Graduated Student	Mesa, AZ	Graduated
Matthew Stefanski	#54	OL	6'4	324	RS senior	Frankfort, MI	Graduated
David Watson	#67	OL	6'5	290	RS senior	Tucson, AZ	Graduated
Donovan Laie	#78	OL	6'5	323	Senior	Oceanside, CA	Graduated
Connor Hutchings	#80	TE	6'5	230	Graduated Student	Phoenix, AZ	Graduated
Bryce Wolma	#81	TE	6'4	237	Graduated Student	Saline, MI	Graduated
Tristen D'Angelo	#84	WR	6'3	200	RS senior	Anthem, AZ	Graduated

==== Coaching staff departures ====
During the off-season, Arizona lost 2 position coaches and 1 support staff members. The two position coaches that departed the team were defensive coordinator Don Brown and linebackers coach Keith Dudzinski. Brown took an upgrade by becoming the 30th head coach to return at UMass, while Dudzinski returned to become the defensive coordinator at UMass. Furthermore, Brown and Dudzinski were the final 2 coaches that were under current head coach Jedd Fisch.

Name	Position	New Team	New Position
Don Brown	Defensive Coordinator	UMass	Head coach
Keith Dudzinski	Assistant coach, Linebackers & Co-Special Teams Coordinator	UMass	Defensive coordinator
Ryan Partridge	Director of High School Scouting and Recruiting coordinator	UMass	Wide receivers coach

==== Outgoing transfers ====
Twenty-four players elected to enter the NCAA Transfer Portal during or after the 2021 season.

Arizona Outgoing transfers
Name	No.	Pos.	Height	Weight	Hometown	Year	New school	Sources
Boobie Curry	#2	WR	6 ft 2 in (1.88 m)	211 pounds (96 kg)	(redshirt) Senior	Houston, TX	Transferred to Buffalo	
BJ Casteel	#5	WR	6 ft 0 in (1.83 m)	197 pounds (89 kg)	(redshirt) Senior	Pasadena, CA	Transferred to Nevada	
Jaden Mitchell	#7	WR	5 ft 9 in (1.75 m)	182 pounds (83 kg)	(redshirt) Freshman	Las Vegas, NV	Transferred to Texas State	
Rhedi Short	#7	DB	6 ft 1 in (1.85 m)	196 pounds (89 kg)	(redshirt) Senior	Pasadena, CA	Transferred to Montana State	
Tayvian Cunningham	#11	WR	5 ft 8 in (1.73 m)	183 pounds (83 kg)	(redshirt) Graduate	Vacaville, CA	TBD	
Brayden Zermeno	#12	QB	6 ft 4 in (1.93 m)	216 pounds (98 kg)	Freshman	Los Angeles, CA	Transferred to UConn	
Jalen Johnson	#13	WR	6 ft 3 in (1.91 m)	209 pounds (95 kg)	(redshirt) Sophomore	Corona, CA	TBD	
Logan Kraut	#14	DB	6 ft 2 in (1.88 m)	197 pounds (89 kg)	Freshman	Santa Rosa, CA	Transferred to UC Davis	
McKenzie Barnes	#15	CB	6 ft 2 in (1.88 m)	185 pounds (84 kg)	Junior	Fresno, CA	Transferred to Hawaii	
Regen Terry	#17	DL	6 ft 4 in (1.93 m)	284 pounds (129 kg)	(redshirt) Freshman	Florence, AZ	Transferred to Boston College	
Jabar Triplett	#17	LB	6 ft 1 in (1.85 m)	229 pounds (104 kg)	(redshirt) Freshman	Baton Rouge, LA	Transferred to Grambling State	
Ma'Jon Wright	#18	WR	6 ft 2 in (1.88 m)	218 pounds (99 kg)	Freshman	Fort Lauderdale, FL	TBD	†
Nick Moore	#18	QB	6 ft 1 in (1.85 m)	182 pounds (83 kg)	Freshman	Newhall, CA	TBD	
Darrius Smith	#20	RB	5 ft 9 in (1.75 m)	187 pounds (85 kg)	(redshirt) Junior	Houston, TX	Transferred to Jacksonville State	
Malik Hausman	#23	DB	6 ft 0 in (1.83 m)	187 pounds (85 kg)	(redshirt) Senior	Las Vegas, NV	Transferred to Hawaii	
Javione Carr	#25	DB	5 ft 11 in (1.80 m)	182 pounds (83 kg)	Freshman	Arlington, TX	Transferred to Kansas State	
Jakelyn Morgan	#27	DB	6 ft 1 in (1.85 m)	170 pounds (77 kg)	Freshman	Tyler, TX	Transferred to Louisiana Tech	
Jackson Bailey	#29	LB	6 ft 3 in (1.91 m)	229 pounds (104 kg)	Freshman	DeSoto, TX	Transferred to Louisiana–Monroe	
Thor Canales	#46	LB	6 ft 3 in (1.91 m)	224 pounds (102 kg)	Freshman	Plano, TX	TBD	
Rourke Freeburg	#47	LB	6 ft 2 in (1.88 m)	220 pounds (100 kg)	(redshirt) Senior	Scottsdale, AZ	Transferred to Toledo	
Lucas Eckardt	#51	OL	6 ft 6 in (1.98 m)	220 pounds (100 kg)	Freshman	Spring Grove, IL	Transferred to Colorado	
David Watson	#67	OL	6 ft 6 in (1.98 m)	290 pounds (130 kg)	(redshirt) Sophomore	Tucson, AZ	Transferred to Adams State	
Edgar Burrola	#72	OL	6 ft 6 in (1.98 m)	305 pounds (138 kg)	(redshirt) Junior	Las Vegas, NV	TBD	
Zach Williams	#82	TE	6 ft 3 in (1.91 m)	235 pounds (107 kg)	(redshirt) Sophomore	Johns Creek, GA	TBD	
Colby Powers	#83	TE	6 ft 4 in (1.93 m)	230 pounds (100 kg)	Freshman	Spring, TX	Transferred to Tulsa	
Stacey Marshall Jr.	#87	TE	6 ft 5 in (1.96 m)	262 pounds (119 kg)	Senior	Montgomery, AL	Transferred to Marshall	
Alex Navarro-Silva	#91	DL	6 ft 5 in (1.96 m)	280 pounds (130 kg)	Sophomore	Chino, CA	TBD	
Myles Tapusoa	#99	DT	6 ft 1 in (1.85 m)	345 pounds (156 kg)	Senior	Rose Park, UT	TBD	

† Note: Players with a dash in the new school column didn't land on a new team for the 2022 season.

=== Acquisitions ===
==== Incoming transfers ====
Over the off-season, Arizona added nine players from the transfer portal. According to 247 Sports, Arizona had the 27th ranked transfer class in the country. The first transfer was quarterback Jayden de Laura. de Laura transferred from Washington State. On the offensive side, Arizona also added Florida State running back D.J. Williams, UTEP wide receiver Jacob Cowing and New Mexico offensive lineman Jack Buford. However, Arizona only took 5 defensive transfers in UCLA defensive back DJ Warnell and UCLA defensive lineman Tiaoalii Savea, Michigan linebacker Anthony Solomon, USC Trojans linebacker Hunter Echols and Utah linebacker Jeremy Mercier.

Arizona Incoming transfers
Name	No.	Pos.	Height	Weight	Year	Hometown	Previous school	Sources
Jacob Cowing	#6	WR	5 ft 11 in (1.80 m)	170 pounds (77 kg)	Sophomore	Maricopa, AZ	UTEP	
Jayden de Laura	#7	QB	6 ft 0 in (1.83 m)	190 pounds (86 kg)	Sophomore	Honolulu, HI	Washington State	
Anthony Solomon	#10	LB	6 ft 1 in (1.85 m)	215 pounds (98 kg)	Junior	Fort Lauderdale, FL	Michigan	
DJ Warnell	#14	DB	6 ft 2 in (1.88 m)	201 pounds (91 kg)	Sophomore	La Marque, TX	UCLA	
Jeremy Mercier	#20	LB	6 ft 3 in (1.91 m)	235 pounds (107 kg)	Junior	Chandler, AZ	Utah	
Hunter Echols	#31	LB	6 ft 5 in (1.96 m)	245 pounds (111 kg)	(redshirt) Senior	Los Angeles, CA	USC	
D.J. Williams	#37	RB	5 ft 10 in (1.78 m)	210 pounds (95 kg)	(redshirt) Junior	Lake Placid, FL	Florida State	
Anthony Ward	#57	LB	6 ft 0 in (1.83 m)	225 pounds (102 kg)	Freshman	Ontario, CA	Washington	
Jack Buford	#59	OT	6 ft 4 in (1.93 m)	310 pounds (140 kg)	Sophomore	St. Louis, MO	New Mexico	
Tanner McLachlan	#84	TE	6 ft 6 in (1.98 m)	255 pounds (116 kg)	Sophomore	Lethbridge, AB	Southern Utah	
Tiaoalii Savea	#98	DL	6 ft 4 in (1.93 m)	275 pounds (125 kg)	Freshman	Las Vegas, NV	UCLA	

==== 2022 recruiting class ====
Arizona signed 25 players in the class of 2022. The Wildcats' recruiting class ranks 19th in the nation for 247Sports and 22nd in Rivals rankings. Four signees were ranked in the ESPN 300 top prospect list. Arizona also signed walk-ons during national signing day period.

College recruiting
Name	Hometown	School	Height	Weight	Commit date
Tetairoa McMillan; WR	Waimanalo, HI	Servite High School (CA)	6 ft 2 in (1.88 m)	185 lb (84 kg)	Dec 17, 2021
Tetairoa McMillan; WR	Recruit ratings: Rivals: 247Sports: On3: ESPN: (83)				
Rayshon Luke; RB	Bellflower, CA	St. John Bosco High School	5 ft 9 in (1.75 m)	165 lb (75 kg)	Jan 8, 2022
Rayshon Luke; RB	Recruit ratings: Rivals: 247Sports: On3: ESPN: (82)				
Keyan Burnett; TE	Anaheim, CA	Servite High School	6 ft 4 in (1.93 m)	210 lb (95 kg)	Aug 1, 2021
Keyan Burnett; TE	Recruit ratings: Rivals: 247Sports: On3: ESPN: (82)				
Ephesians Prysock; S	Mission Hills, CA	Bishop Alemany High School	6 ft 3 in (1.91 m)	170 lb (77 kg)	Dec 15, 2021
Ephesians Prysock; S	Recruit ratings: Rivals: 247Sports: On3: ESPN: (82)				
Sterling Lane; LB	Westlake Village, CA	Oaks Christian School	6 ft 4 in (1.93 m)	235 lb (107 kg)	Aug 20, 2021
Sterling Lane; LB	Recruit ratings: Rivals: 247Sports: On3: ESPN: (80)				
Kevin Green Jr. WR	Mission Hills, CA	Bishop Alemany High School	5 ft 11 in (1.80 m)	165 lb (75 kg)	Dec 11, 2021
Kevin Green Jr. WR	Recruit ratings: Rivals: 247Sports: On3: ESPN: (80)				
Tyler Martin; LB	Cambridge, MA	Buckingham Browne & Nichols School	6 ft 3 in (1.91 m)	230 lb (100 kg)	Sep 16, 2021
Tyler Martin; LB	Recruit ratings: Rivals: 247Sports: On3: ESPN: (79)				
Grayson Stovall; OG	Chandler, AZ	Hamilton High School	6 ft 3 in (1.91 m)	275 lb (125 kg)	Jan 21, 2021
Grayson Stovall; OG	Recruit ratings: Rivals: 247Sports: On3: ESPN: (78)				
Russell Davis II; DE	Chandler, AZ	Hamilton High School	6 ft 3 in (1.91 m)	215 lb (98 kg)	Jul 3, 2021
Russell Davis II; DE	Recruit ratings: Rivals: 247Sports: On3: ESPN: (78)				
Jonah Coleman; RB	Stockton, CA	Lincoln High School	5 ft 9 in (1.75 m)	180 lb (82 kg)	Mar 1, 2021
Jonah Coleman; RB	Recruit ratings: Rivals: 247Sports: On3: ESPN: (78)				
Tacario Davis; CB	Long Beach, CA	Millikan High School	6 ft 2 in (1.88 m)	185 lb (84 kg)	Feb 21, 2021
Tacario Davis; CB	Recruit ratings: Rivals: 247Sports: On3: ESPN: (77)				
A.J. Jones; WR	Ontario, CA	Colony High School	6 ft 4 in (1.93 m)	195 lb (88 kg)	Jul 5, 2021
A.J. Jones; WR	Recruit ratings: Rivals: 247Sports: On3: ESPN: (77)				
Jai-Ayviauynn Celestine; ATH	Miami, FL	Miami Palmetto Senior High School	5 ft 10 in (1.78 m)	175 lb (79 kg)	Dec 15, 2021
Jai-Ayviauynn Celestine; ATH	Recruit ratings: Rivals: 247Sports: On3: ESPN: (76)				
Noah Fifita; QB	Anaheim, CA	Servite High School	5 ft 11 in (1.80 m)	175 lb (79 kg)	Apr 5, 2021
Noah Fifita; QB	Recruit ratings: Rivals: 247Sports: On3: ESPN: (76)				
Isaiah Johnson; DT	Chandler, AZ	Chandler High School	6 ft 3 in (1.91 m)	285 lb (129 kg)	Jul 13, 2021
Isaiah Johnson; DT	Recruit ratings: Rivals: 247Sports: On3: ESPN: (76)				
Jacob Manu; LB	Anaheim, CA	Servite High School	5 ft 11 in (1.80 m)	210 lb (95 kg)	Oct 10, 2021
Jacob Manu; LB	Recruit ratings: Rivals: 247Sports: On3: ESPN: (76)				
Jermaine Wiggins Jr. DE	Boxford, MA	Bridgton Academy	6 ft 4 in (1.93 m)	230 lb (100 kg)	Mar 19, 2021
Jermaine Wiggins Jr. DE	Recruit ratings: Rivals: 247Sports: On3: ESPN: (75)				
Jonah Savaiinaea; OG	Honolulu, HI	Saint Louis School	6 ft 3 in (1.91 m)	330 lb (150 kg)	Jun 22, 2021
Jonah Savaiinaea; OG	Recruit ratings: Rivals: 247Sports: On3: ESPN: (75)				
Taitai Uiagelelei; DE	Santa Ana, CA	Mater Dei High School	6 ft 3 in (1.91 m)	255 lb (116 kg)	Dec 15, 2021
Taitai Uiagelelei; DE	Recruit ratings: Rivals: 247Sports: On3: ESPN: (74)				
Tyler Powell; TE	Phoenix, AZ	Brophy Prep	6 ft 7 in (2.01 m)	240 lb (110 kg)	Aug 13, 2021
Tyler Powell; TE	Recruit ratings: Rivals: 247Sports: On3: ESPN: (74)				
Jacob Reece; OG	Salt Lake City, UT	Brighton High School	6 ft 5 in (1.96 m)	290 lb (130 kg)	Dec 7, 2021
Jacob Reece; OG	Recruit ratings: Rivals: 247Sports: On3: ESPN: (72)				
Wendell Moe; OL	Long Beach, CA	Long Beach Poly High School	6 ft 3 in (1.91 m)	330 lb (150 kg)	Apr 30, 2022
Wendell Moe; OL	Recruit ratings: 247Sports:				
Overall recruit ranking: Rivals: #22 247Sports: #19 On3: #30 ESPN: #24
‡ Refers to 40-yard dash; Note: In many cases, Scout, Rivals, 247Sports, On3, and ESPN may conflict in their listings of height, weight and 40 time.; In these cases, the average was taken. ESPN grades are on a 100-point scale.; Sources: "Arizona Football Commitment List". Rivals.; "2022 Player Commitments – Arizona". ESPN.; "2022 Team Ranking". Rivals.com.; "2022 Arizona Wildcats football team". 247Sports.

*= 247Sports Composite rating; ratings are out of 1.00. (five stars= 1.00–.98, four stars= .97–.90, three stars= .80–.89, two stars= .79–.70, no stars= <70)
†= Despite being rated as a four and five star recruit by ESPN, On3.com, Rivals.com and 247Sports.com, McMillan received a four star 247Sports Composite rating.
Δ= Left the Arizona program following signing but prior to the 2022 season.

2022 overall class rankings

Website	National rank	Conference rank	5 star recruits	4 star recruits	3 star recruits	2 star recruits	1 star recruits	No star ranking
ESPN	#24	#2	-	6	17	0	0	0
On3 Recruits	#27	#2	-	5	17	0	0	0
Rivals	#19	#1	1	4	15	3	0	0
247 Sports	#21	#2	-	5	17	0	0	0

==== Walk-ons ====
Name	Pos.	Height	Weight	Hometown	High school
Joe Borjon	OL	6'8	330	La Puente, CA	Mt. San Antonio College (JC)
Jax Stam	DB	5'11	195	Peoria, AZ	Liberty High School
Jacob Rich Kongaika	DL	6'2	280	Santa Ana, CA	Mater Dei High School
Cole Tannebaum	QB	6'4	200	Brentwood, CA	Oaks Christian School
John Hart	TE	6'4	232	Peoria, AZ	Sunrise Mountain High School
Rex Haynes	WR	6'4	195	San Diego, CA	Cathedral Catholic High School
Matthew Moore	WR	6'3	203	Pomona, CA	Carlsbad High School (California)
Sam Graci-Glazer	WR	6'3	160	Tampa, FL	IMG Academy
Gavin Smith	WR	5'11	180	Scottsdale, AZ	Notre Dame Prep
Jake George	WR	6'3	190	Whittier, CA	La Serna High School
Javier Perkins	OL	6'4	295	Wauwatosa, WI	Wauwatosa West High School
Devin Dunn	CB	5'11	195	Chandler, AZ	Chandler High School
Brandon Craddock	LB	6'0	218	Phoenix, AZ	Sandra Day O'Connor High School
Will Uhrich	S	6'1	195	Burlingame, CA	Burlingame High School
Jordan Forbes	P	6'1	205	Mesa, AZ	Desert Ridge High School

==== 2023 recruiting class ====
College recruiting (2023)
Name	Hometown	School	Height	Weight	Commit date
Brayden Dorman; QB	Colorado Springs, CO	Vista Ridge High School	6 ft 5 in (1.96 m)	195 lb (88 kg)	Feb 22, 2022
Brayden Dorman; QB	Recruit ratings: Rivals: 247Sports: On3: ESPN: (82)				
Carlos Wilson; WR	Sacramento, CA	Inderkum High School	6 ft 0 in (1.83 m)	165 lb (75 kg)	Dec 21, 2022
Carlos Wilson; WR	Recruit ratings: Rivals: 247Sports: On3: ESPN: (80)				
Raymond Pulido; OL	Apple Valley, CA	Apple Valley High School	6 ft 6 in (1.98 m)	325 lb (147 kg)	Aug 13, 2022
Raymond Pulido; OL	Recruit ratings: Rivals: 247Sports: On3: ESPN: (79)				
Brandon Johnson; RB	Palmdale, CA	Highland High School	6 ft 2 in (1.88 m)	280 lb (130 kg)	Jun 14, 2022
Brandon Johnson; RB	Recruit ratings: Rivals: 247Sports: On3: ESPN: (79)				
Malachi Riley; WR	Corona, CA	Centennial High School	6 ft 1 in (1.85 m)	165 lb (75 kg)	Dec 16, 2022
Malachi Riley; WR	Recruit ratings: Rivals: 247Sports: On3: ESPN: (79)				
Rhino Tapaatoutai; OT	Mission Hills, CA	Bishop Alemany High School	6 ft 5 in (1.96 m)	280 lb (130 kg)	Apr 18, 2022
Rhino Tapaatoutai; OT	Recruit ratings: Rivals: 247Sports: On3: ESPN: (78)				
Taye Brown; LB	Chandler, AZ	Hamilton High School	6 ft 2 in (1.88 m)	220 lb (100 kg)	Nov 26, 2022
Taye Brown; LB	Recruit ratings: Rivals: 247Sports: On3: ESPN: (78)				
Emmanuel Karnley; CB	Pittsburg, CA	Pittsburg High School	6 ft 2 in (1.88 m)	180 lb (82 kg)	Dec 16, 2022
Emmanuel Karnley; CB	Recruit ratings: Rivals: 247Sports: On3: ESPN: (78)				
Arian Parish; S	Katy, TX	Katy High School	5 ft 11 in (1.80 m)	170 lb (77 kg)	Jun 10, 2022
Arian Parish; S	Recruit ratings: Rivals: 247Sports: On3: ESPN: (77)				
Canyon Moses; CB	Midland, TX	Midland High School	5 ft 9 in (1.75 m)	185 lb (84 kg)	Feb 1, 2022
Canyon Moses; CB	Recruit ratings: Rivals: 247Sports: On3: ESPN: (77)				
Elijha Payne; OT	Las Vegas, NV	Desert Pines High School	6 ft 6 in (1.98 m)	286 lb (130 kg)	Jul 13, 2022
Elijha Payne; OT	Recruit ratings: Rivals: 247Sports: On3: ESPN:				
Justin Johnson; S	Inglewood, CA	Inglewood High School	6 ft 1 in (1.85 m)	200 lb (91 kg)	Apr 5, 2022
Justin Johnson; S	Recruit ratings: Rivals: 247Sports: On3: ESPN: (77)				
Tylen Gonzalez; DE	Carlsbad, NM	Carlsbad High School	6 ft 5 in (1.96 m)	250 lb (110 kg)	Jun 5, 2022
Tylen Gonzalez; DE	Recruit ratings: Rivals: ESPN: (77)				
Nicholas Gonzalez; DE	San Pedro, CA	San Pedro High School	6 ft 4 in (1.93 m)	255 lb (116 kg)	Nov 9, 2022
Nicholas Gonzalez; DE	Recruit ratings: Rivals: 247Sports: On3: ESPN: (76)				
Dorian Thomas; TE	Kent, WA	Kentridge High School	6 ft 6 in (1.98 m)	215 lb (98 kg)	Dec 21, 2022
Dorian Thomas; TE	Recruit ratings: Rivals: 247Sports: On3: ESPN: (76)				
Tristan Davis; DE	Lake Oswego, OR	Lake Oswego High School	6 ft 6 in (1.98 m)	235 lb (107 kg)	Aug 2, 2022
Tristan Davis; DE	Recruit ratings: Rivals: 247Sports: On3: ESPN: (76)				
Gavin Hunter; ATH	Mililani, HI	Mililani High School	6 ft 2 in (1.88 m)	190 lb (86 kg)	Jun 8, 2022
Gavin Hunter; ATH	Recruit ratings: Rivals: 247Sports: On3: ESPN: (76)				
Jackson Holman; TE	Mission Viejo, CA	Mission Viejo High School	6 ft 4 in (1.93 m)	200 lb (91 kg)	Jul 2, 2022
Jackson Holman; TE	Recruit ratings: Rivals: 247Sports: On3: ESPN: (76)				
Julien Savaiinaea; DE	Honolulu, HI	Saint Louis School	6 ft 3 in (1.91 m)	240 lb (110 kg)	Jun 15, 2022
Julien Savaiinaea; DE	Recruit ratings: Rivals: 247Sports: ESPN: (75)				
Dominic Lolesio; DE	Long Beach, CA	Long Beach Polytechnic High School	6 ft 3 in (1.91 m)	230 lb (100 kg)	Jun 8, 2022
Dominic Lolesio; DE	Recruit ratings: Rivals: 247Sports: ESPN: (75)				
Genesis Smith; S	Chandler, AZ	Hamilton High School	6 ft 1 in (1.85 m)	190 lb (86 kg)	Aug 27, 2022
Genesis Smith; S	Recruit ratings: Rivals: 247Sports: ESPN: (75)				
Kamuela Kaaihue; LB	Honolulu, HI	Roosevelt High School	6 ft 2 in (1.88 m)	210 lb (95 kg)	Jun 8, 2022
Kamuela Kaaihue; LB	Recruit ratings: Rivals: 247Sports: ESPN: (73)				
Overall recruit ranking:
‡ Refers to 40-yard dash; Note: In many cases, Scout, Rivals, 247Sports, On3, and ESPN may conflict in their listings of height, weight and 40 time.; In these cases, the average was taken. ESPN grades are on a 100-point scale.; Sources: "Arizona Football Commitment List". Rivals.; "2023 Player Commitments – Arizona". ESPN.; "2023 Team Ranking". Rivals.com.; "2022 Arizona Wildcats football team". 247Sports.

2023 overall class rankings

Website	National rank	Conference rank	5 star recruits	4 star recruits	3 star recruits	2 star recruits	1 star recruits	No star ranking
ESPN	--	--	-	2	14	0	0	0
On3 Recruits	#56	#6	-	1	11	0	0	0
Rivals	#36	#4	--	1	11	0	0	0
247 Sports	#36	#4	-	1	15	0	0	0

==== Coaching staff additions ====
Name	Previous Position/Team	New Position/Team
Johnny Nansen	Defensive line coach (UCLA)	Defensive coordinator (Arizona)
Jason Kaufusi	Assistant coach, Outside linebackers (UCLA)	Outside linebackers/Defensive ends (Arizona)
Jordan Paopao	Tight ends (UNLV)	Special teams coordinator/Tight ends (Arizona)

=== Returning starters ===
Offense
Player	Class	Position	Games started
Will Plummer	Sophomore	Quarterback	
Michael Wiley	Junior	Running back	
Jarmarye Joiner	RS junior	Wide receiver	
Dorian Singer	Sophomore	Wide receiver	
Paiton Fears	RS senior	Offensive line	

Defense
Player	Class	Position	Games started
J.B. Brown	Grad Student	Defensive line	
Jerry Roberts	Grad Student	Linebacker	
Christian Roland-Wallace	Senior	Cornerback	

Special teams
Player	Class	Position	Games started
Tyler Loop	Sophomore	Placekicker	
Kyle Ostendorp	Junior	Punter	
Kameron Hawkins	Sophomore	Long snapper	
Michael Wiley	Junior	Kickoff Returner	
Jamarye Joiner	RSJunior	Punt Returner	

† Indicates player was a starter in 2021 but missed all of 2022 due to injury.

== Preseason ==
=== Spring game ===
The 2022 Wildcats spring game is tentatively scheduled to take place in Tucson, Arizona on April 9, 2022. The Wildcats were scheduled to hold spring practices on March 2 to April 7, 2022.

ARZ Red at ARZ Blue

Quarter	1	2	3	4	Total
ARZ Red	0	10	14	0	24
ARZ Blue	7	0	7	7	21

at Arizona Stadium, Tucson, AZ

- Date: April 9, 2022
- Game time: TBD MDT
- TV: P12N

=== Award watch lists ===
Listed in the order that they were released

Award	Player	Position	Year	Ref
Lott Trophy	Kyon Barrs	DL	Jr.	
Maxwell Award	Jacob Cowing	WR	Jr.	
Biletnikoff Award	Dorian Singer	WR	So.	
Lou Groza Award	Tyler Loop	PK	So.	
Ray Guy Award	Kyle Ostendorp	P	Jr.	
Wuerffel Trophy	Jordan Morgan	OL	Jr.	
Polynesian College Football Player Of The Year Award	Jonah Savaiinaea	OL	Fr.	
Polynesian College Football Player Of The Year Award	Tetairoa McMillan	WR	Fr.	
Polynesian College Football Player Of The Year Award	Tiaoalii Savea	DL	So.	
Manning Award	Jayden de Laura	QB	So.	

=== Pac-12 Media Day ===
The Pac-12 Media Day was held on July 29, 2022 at the Novo Theater, LA Live (Pac-12 Network) with Jedd Fisch (HC), Jacob Cowing (WR) and Christian Young (DB). The preseason polls will be released on July 28, 2022. Arizona was picked to finish 11th in the annual Pac-12 football media poll released by the league.

=== Preseason All-Pac-12 and All-American honors ===
First team

Position	Player	Class	Team
Special teams
PK	Kyle Ostendorp	Senior	Arizona

Second team

Position	Player	Class	Team
Offense
WR	Jacob Cowing	Senior	Arizona
Defense
DL	Kyon Barrs	Senior	Arizona

Pre-season All-American Honors
Player	Position	AP	CBS Sports	ESPN	Sporting News	WCFF	Designation
Kyle Ostendorp	P (#19)	2nd team	2nd team	2nd team	2nd team	2nd team	Unanimous

== Roster ==
2022 Arizona Wildcats football team roster
Players
Coaches
Offense

Pos.	#	Name	Class
WR	1	Anthony Simpson	So
WR	2	Jacob Cowing	Jr
WR	4	Tetairoa McMillan	Fr
WR	5	Dorian Singer	So
RB	6	Michael Wiley	Jr
QB	7	Jayden de Laura	So
RB	8	Drake Anderson	Jr
QB	9	Gunner Cruz	So
WR	10	Jamayre Jones	Jr
QB	11	Noah Fifita	Fr
WR	12	Kevin Green Jr.	Fr
QB	14	Cole Tannenbaum	Fr
QB	15	Will Plummer	So
WR	16	A. J. Jones	Fr
RB	20	Rayshon Luke	Fr
RB	21	Jalen John	So
RB	23	Stevie Rocker Jr.	So
RB	24	Jonah Coleman	Fr
WR	25	Chris Hunter	Fr
WR	26	Jaden Clark	Fr
WR	27	Rex Haynes	Fr
RB	28	Nazar Bombata	Jr
RB	29	Jashon Butler	Jr
RB	32	D. J. Williams	Sr
RB	33	James Bohls	Fr
OL	54	Jacob Reece	Fr
OL	55	J. T. Hand	Fr
OL	56	Josh Donovan	Sr
OL	57	Shontrail Key	Fr
OL	58	Sam Langi	Jr
OL	62	Joseph Borjon	So
OL	65	Leif Magnuson	Fr
OL	71	Jonah Savaiinaea	Fr
OL	72	Wendell Moe	Fr
OL	73	Woody Jean	Fr
OL	74	Paiton Fears	Sr
OL	74	Josh Baker	So
OL	76	Anthony Patt	Fr
OL	77	Jordan Morgan	Jr
OL	78	Grayson Stovall	Fr
WR	80	Matthew Moore	Fr
WR	81	Jake George	Fr
WR	82	Gavin Smith	Fr
WR	83	Sam Graci-Glazer	Fr
TE	84	Tanner McLachlan	Jr
TE	85	Roberto Miranda	Fr
TE	86	John Hart	Fr
TE	87	Tyler Powell	Fr
TE	89	Keyan Burnett	Fr

Defense

Pos.	#	Name	Class
DE	1	Jalen Harris	Sr
CB	2	Isaiah Rutherford	Jr
S	3	Jaydin Young	So
CB	4	Christian Roland-Wallace	Jr
S	5	Christian Young	Sr
DE	6	Jason Harris	Fr
CB	7	Ephesians Prysock	Fr
LB	8	Sterling Lane II	Fr
S	9	Gunner Maldonado	So
LB	10	Anthony Solomon	Sr
LB	11	Kolbe Cage	Fr
CB	13	Isaiah Mays	Jr
S	14	D. J. Warnell Jr.	So
S	16	Dalton Johnson	Fr
S	18	Isaiah Taylor	Fr
CB	19	Adama Fall	Fr
CB	20	Treydan Stukes	So
S	21	Jaxen Turner	Jr
CB	23	Tacario Davis	Fr
CB	24	Jai-Ayviauynn Celestine	Fr
S	27	Will Uhrich	Fr
CB	29	Devin Dunn	Fr
S	30	Jax Stam	Fr
DL	31	Hunter Echols	Sr
LB	32	Mojo Weerts	Fr
S	35	Samuel Chung	Fr
LB	36	R. J. Edwards	So
DE	37	Kevon Garcia	Fr
LB	38	Dante Smith	Jr
CB	39	Jeffrey Robinson	Fr
LB	40	Ammon Allen	Fr
DE	41	Eddie Siaumau-Sanitoa	So
LB	44	Jeremy Mercier	Jr
LB	45	Issaiah Johnson	Jr
DE	46	Ta'ita'i Uiagalelei	Fr
LB	47	Victor Zayas	Fr
LB	48	Jerry Roberts	Sr
LB	50	Brandon Craddock	Fr
LB	53	Malik Reed	So
LB	54	Tyler Martin	Fr
DL	55	Evan Branch-Haynes	Fr
LB	57	Anthony Ward	Fr
LB	59	Jacob Manu	Fr
DL	90	Isaiah Ward	Fr
DL	91	Isaiah Johnson	Fr
DL	92	Kyon Barrs	Jr
DL	93	Jacob Kongaika	Fr
DL	94	Dion Wilson Jr.	So
DL	95	Paris Shand	So
DL	96	Traemaine Savea	Sr
DL	97	Jermaine Wiggins Jr.	Fr
DL	98	Tiaoali Savea	So
DL	99	Russell Davis II	Fr

Special teams

Pos.	#	Name	Class
P	19	Kyle Ostendorp	Jr
K	33	Tyler Loop	So
LS	39	Kameron Hawkins	So
P	42	Brady Weinberg	Fr
P	49	Jordan Forbes	Fr
LS	64	Seth MacKellar	Jr

Head coach

- Jedd Fisch

Coordinators/assistant coaches

- Brennan Carroll – Offensive Coordinator/Offensive Line
- Johnny Nansen – Defensive Coordinator
- Jimmie Dougherty – Passing Game Coordinator/Quarterbacks
- Jordan Paopao – Special Teams Coordinator/Tight Ends
- Chuck Cecil – Defensive Backs
- Kevin Cummings – Wide Receivers
- Scottie Graham – Running Backs
- Ricky Hunley – Defensive Line
- Jason Kaufusi – Defensive Ends/Outside Linebackers
- DeWayne Walker – Defensive Backs

Legend

- (C) Team captain
- (S) Suspended
- (I) Ineligible
- Injured
- Redshirt

Roster
Last update: 10/23/22

== Schedule ==
Date	Time	Opponent	Site	TV	Result	Attendance
September 3	12:30 p.m.	at San Diego State*	Snapdragon Stadium; San Diego, CA	CBS	W 38–20	34,046
September 10	8:00 p.m.	Mississippi State*	Arizona Stadium; Tucson, AZ	FS1	L 17–39	46,275
September 17	8:00 p.m.	No. 1 (FCS) North Dakota State*	Arizona Stadium; Tucson, AZ	FS1	W 31–28	41,211
September 24	2:30 p.m.	at California	California Memorial Stadium; Berkeley, CA	P12N	L 31–49	37,216
October 1	6:30 p.m.	Colorado	Arizona Stadium; Tucson, AZ	P12N	W 43–20	36,591
October 8	6:00 p.m.	No. 12 Oregon	Arizona Stadium; Tucson, AZ	P12N	L 22–49	50,800
October 15	2:30 p.m.	at Washington	Husky Stadium; Seattle, WA	P12N	L 39–49	63,189
October 29	4:00 p.m.	No. 10 USC^{†}	Arizona Stadium; Tucson, AZ	P12N	L 37–45	44,006
November 5	4:30 p.m.	at No. 14 Utah	Rice-Eccles Stadium; Salt Lake City, UT	P12N	L 20–45	51,919
November 12	8:30 p.m.	at No. 12 UCLA	Rose Bowl; Pasadena, CA	FOX	W 34–28	44,430
November 19	12:00 p.m.	Washington State	Arizona Stadium; Tucson, AZ	P12N	L 20–31	40,717
November 25	1:00 p.m.	Arizona State	Arizona Stadium; Tucson, AZ (rivalry)	FS1	W 38–35	49,865
*Non-conference game; ^{†}Homecoming; Rankings from AP Poll and CFP Rankings after November 1 released prior to game; All times are in Mountain time

== Game summaries ==
=== at San Diego State ===
Arizona Wildcats (0–0) at San Diego State Aztecs (0–0) – Game summary

Quarter	1	2	3	4	Total
Wildcats	10	14	7	7	38
Aztecs	0	10	10	0	20

at Snapdragon Stadium • San Diego, CA

- Date: September 3, 2022
- Game time: 12:30 p.m.
- Game weather: Sunny, 100 °F (38 °C)
- Game attendance: 34,046
- Referee: Francisco Villar
- TV announcers (CBS): Brad Nessler (play-by-play), Gary Danielson (analyst), Jenny Dell (sideline)

Game information

First quarter

- (7:06) ARIZ – Tyler Loop 25-yard field goal (Drive: 16 plays, 66 yards, 5:35; Arizona 3–0)
- (3:19) ARIZ – Jacob Cowing 17-yard pass from Jayden de Laura, Tyler Loop kick (Drive: 7 plays, 40 yards, 2:59; Arizona 10–0)

Second quarter

- (13:31) SDSU – Jack Browning 44-yard field goal (Drive: 11 plays, 48 yards, 4:48; Arizona 10–3)
- (10:19) ARIZ – Tetairoa McMillan 6-yard pass from Jayden de Laura, Tyler Loop kick (Drive: 8 plays, 75 yards, 3:12; Arizona 17–3)
- (4:49) SDSU – Tyrell Shavers 11-yard pass from Braxton Burmeister, Jack Browning kick (Drive: 7 plays, 32 yards, 3:37; Arizona 17–10)
- (0:28) ARIZ – Jacob Cowing 4-yard pass from Jayden de Laura, Tyler Loop kick (Drive: 6 plays, 54 yards, 2:07; Arizona 24–10)

Third quarter

- (12:40) ARIZ – Jacob Cowing 25-yard pass from Jayden de Laura, Tyler Loop kick (Drive: 5 plays, 75 yards, 2:20; Arizona 31–10)
- (7:46) SDSU – Jaylon Armstong 0-yard blocked punt return, Jack Browning kick (Drive: 3 plays, -2 yards, 1:03; Arizona 31–17)
- (3:36) SDSU – Jack Browning 23-yard field goal (Drive: 8 plays, 37 yards, 3:19; Arizona 31–20)

Fourth quarter

- (13:02) ARIZ – D. J. Williams 10-yard run, Tyler Loop kick (Drive: 11 plays, 75 yards, 5:34; Arizona 38–20)

Statistics	ARIZ	SDSU
First downs	25	14
Total yards	461	232
Rushes/yards	39–162	42–170
Passing yards	299	62
Passing: Comp–Att–Int	22–35–1	7–16–1
Time of possession	32:37	27:23

Team	Category	Player	Statistics
Arizona	Passing	Jayden de Laura	22/35, 299 yards, 4 TD, INT
Arizona	Rushing	D. J. Williams	14 carries, 88 yards, TD
Arizona	Receiving	Jacob Cowing	8 receptions, 152 yards, 3 TD
San Diego State	Passing	Braxton Burmeister	5/10, 51 yards, TD, INT
San Diego State	Rushing	Cam Davis	8 carries, 39 yards
San Diego State	Receiving	Kenan Christon	2 receptions, 19 yards

=== vs Mississippi State ===
Mississippi State Bulldogs (1–0) vs Arizona Wildcats (1–0) – Game summary

Quarter	1	2	3	4	Total
Bulldogs	15	3	7	14	39
Wildcats	7	3	7	0	17

at Arizona Stadium • Tucson, AZ

- Date: September 10, 2022
- Game time: 8:00 p.m.
- Game weather: Cloudy, 84 °F (29 °C)
- Game attendance: 46,275
- Referee: Kyle Olson
- TV announcers (FS1): Alex Faust (play-by-play), Petros Papadakis (analyst)

Game information

First quarter

- (12:57) ARIZ – Michael Wiley 34-yard run, Tyler Loop kick (Drive: 6 plays, 75 yards, 1:55; Arizona 7–0)
- (9:14) MSST – Jo'quavious Marks 9-yard run (Drive: 8 plays, 70 yards, 3:13; Arizona 7–6)
- (5:27) MSST – Caleb Ducking 9-yard pass from Will Rogers (Drive: 3 plays, 22 yards, 1:03; Mississippi State 12–7)
- (0:40) MSST – Ben Raybon 39-yard field goal (Drive: 7 plays, 19 yards, 3:46; Mississippi State 15–7)

Second quarter

- (12:55) ARIZ – Tyler Loop 43-yard field goal (Drive: 4 plays, 2 yards, 1:27; Mississippi State 15–10)
- (0:33) MSST – Ben Raybon 22-yard field goal (Drive: 14 plays, 76 yards, 6:19; Mississippi State 18–10)

Third quarter

- (10:45) MSST – Austin Williams 5-yard pass from Will Rogers, Ben Raybon kick (Drive: 8 plays, 75 yards, 4:15; Mississippi State 25–10)
- (7:37) ARIZ – Jacob Cowing 2-yard pass from Jayden de Laura, Tyler Loop kick (Drive: 2 plays, 4 yards, 0:48; Mississippi State 25–17)

Fourth quarter

- (14:17) MSST – Austin Williams 4-yard pass from Will Rogers, Ben Raybon kick (Drive: 4 plays, 11 yards, 1:49; Mississippi State 32–17)
- (3:18) MSST – Caleb Ducking 2-yard pass from Will Rogers, Ben Raybon kick (Drive: 12 plays, 69 yards, 5:58; Mississippi State 39–17)

Statistics	MSST	ARIZ
First downs	27	19
Total yards	426	316
Rushes/yards	24–106	22–40
Passing yards	320	276
Passing: Comp–Att–Int	40–49–1	27–54–3
Time of possession	36:57	23:03

Team	Category	Player	Statistics
Mississippi State	Passing	Will Rogers	39/48, 313 yards, 4 TD, INT
Mississippi State	Rushing	Dillon Johnson	11 carries, 60 yards
Mississippi State	Receiving	RaRa Thomas	5 receptions, 63 yards
Arizona	Passing	Jayden de Laura	23/45, 220 yards, TD, 3 INT
Arizona	Rushing	Michael Wiley	6 carries, 49 yards, TD
Arizona	Receiving	Tetairoa McMillan	4 receptions, 69 yards

=== vs North Dakota State ===
North Dakota State Bison (2–0) vs Arizona Wildcats (1–1) – Game summary

Quarter	1	2	3	4	Total
Bison	7	7	14	0	28
Wildcats	7	10	7	7	31

at Arizona Stadium • Tucson, AZ

- Date: September 17, 2022
- Game time: 8:00 p.m.
- Game weather: Clear, 86 °F (30 °C)
- Game attendance: 41,211
- Referee: Mike McCabe
- TV announcers (FS1): Alex Faust (play-by-play), Petros Papadakis (analyst)

Game information

First quarter

- (5:18) ARIZ – Michael Wiley 6-yard run, Tyler Loop kick (Drive: 8 plays, 59 yards, 3:45; Arizona 7–0)
- (0:59) NDSU – Hunter Luepke 31-yard pass from Cam Miller, Griffin Crosa kick (Drive: 9 plays, 80 yards, 4:12; Tied 7–7)

Second quarter

- (5:45) ARIZ – Jayden de Laura 7-yard run, Tyler Loop kick (Drive: 10 plays, 83 yards, 4:44; Arizona 14–7)
- (0:50) NDSU – Cam Miller 2-yard run, Griffin Crosa kick (Drive: 9 plays, 75 yards, 4:55; Tied 14–14)
- (0:00) ARIZ – Tyler Loop 36-yard field goal (Drive: 4 plays, 56 yards, 0:50; Arizona 17–14)

Third quarter

- (9:40) NDSU – Hunter Luepke 6-yard run, Griffin Crosa kick (Drive: 6 plays, 76 yards, 2:45; North Dakota State 21–17)
- (5:41) ARIZ – Jonah Coleman 2-yard run, Tyler Loop kick (Drive: 8 plays, 75 yards, 3:59; Arizona 24–21)
- (2:07) NDSU – Hunter Luepke 38-yard run, Griffin Crosa kick (Drive: 7 plays, 75 yards, 3:34; North Dakota State 28–24)

Fourth quarter

- (4:53) ARIZ – Jacob Cowing 22-yard pass from Jayden de Laura, Tyler Loop kick (Drive: 10 plays, 78 yards, 4:06; Arizona 31–28)

Statistics	NDSU	ARIZ
First downs	21	23
Total yards	407	394
Rushes/yards	45–283	36–165
Passing yards	124	229
Passing: Comp–Att–Int	10–12–0	20–28–0
Time of possession	31:18	28:42

Team	Category	Player	Statistics
North Dakota State	Passing	Cam Miller	10/12, 124 yards, TD
North Dakota State	Rushing	Hunter Luepke	18 carries, 115 yards, 2 TD
North Dakota State	Receiving	Hunter Luepke	3 receptions, 65 yards, TD
Arizona	Passing	Jayden de Laura	20/28, 229 yards, TD
Arizona	Rushing	Michael Wiley	9 carries, 51 yards, TD
Arizona	Receiving	Dorian Singer	6 receptions, 88 yards

=== at California ===
Arizona Wildcats (2–1) at California Golden Bears (2–1) – Game summary

Quarter	1	2	3	4	Total
Wildcats	14	10	0	7	31
Golden Bears	7	14	14	14	49

at California Memorial Stadium • Berkeley, CA

- Date: September 24, 2022
- Game time: 2:37 p.m.
- Game weather: Sunny, 80 °F (27 °C)
- Game attendance: 37,216
- Referee: Mark Duddy
- TV announcers (Pac-12 Network): J. B. Long (play-by-play), Max Browne (analyst)

Game information

First quarter

- (14:17) CAL – Jaydn Ott 73-yard run, Dario Longhetto kick (Drive: 7 plays, 75 yards, 0:43; California 7–7)
- (11:16) ARIZ – Jonah Coleman 1-yard run, Tyler Loop kick (Drive: 8 plays, 75 yards, 3:01; Tied 7–7)
- (5:28) ARIZ – Michael Wiley 1-yard run, Tyler Loop kick (Drive: 9 plays, 92 yards, 4:23; Arizona 14–7)

Second quarter

- (11:56) CAL – J. Michael Sturdivant 16-yard pass from Jack Plummer, Dario Longhetto kick (Drive: 8 plays, 80 yards, 3:22; Tied 14–14)
- (10:00) ARIZ – Tetairoa McMillan 24-yard pass from Jayden de Laura, Tyler Loop kick (Drive: 6 plays, 75 yards, 1:56; Arizona 21–14)
- (3:40) CAL – DeCarlos Brooks 3-yard run, Dario Longhetto kick (Drive: 13 plays, 82 yards, 6:16; Tied 21–21)
- (0:40) ARIZ – Tyler Loop 37-yard field goal (Drive: 10 plays, 41 yards, 2:53; Arizona 24–21)

Third quarter

- (9:17) CAL – Keleki Latu 3-yard pass from Jack Plummer, Dario Longhetto kick (Drive: 8 plays, 87 yards, 4:03; California 28–24)
- (4:59) CAL – Jaydn Ott 18-yard run, Dario Longhetto kick (Drive: 5 plays, 58 yards, 2:14; California 35–24)

Fourth quarter

- (14:53) CAL – Jeremiah Hunter 37-yard pass from Jack Plummer, Dario Longhetto kick (Drive: 6 plays, 71 yards, 2:53; California 42–24)
- (12:36) ARIZ – Jacob Cowing 14-yard pass from Jayden de Laura, Tyler Loop kick (Drive: 6 plays, 75 yards, 2:17; California 42–31)
- (4:56) CAL – Jaydn Ott 72-yard run, Dario Longhetto kick (Drive: 2 plays, 75 yards, 0:55; California 49–31)

Statistics	ARIZ	CAL
First downs	31	27
Total yards	536	599
Rushes/yards	26–135	38–354
Passing yards	401	245
Passing: Comp–Att–Int	27–45–2	18–28–0
Time of possession	26:46	33:14

Team	Category	Player	Statistics
Arizona	Passing	Jayden de Laura	27/45, 402 yards, 2 TD, 2 INT
Arizona	Rushing	Michael Wiley	14 carries, 79 yards, TD
Arizona	Receiving	Jacob Cowing	7 receptions, 133 yards, TD
California	Passing	Jack Plummer	18/28, 245 yards, 3 TD
California	Rushing	Jaydn Ott	19 carries, 274 yards, 3 TD
California	Receiving	Jeremiah Hunter	5 receptions, 82 yards

=== vs Colorado ===
Colorado Buffaloes (0–4) vs Arizona Wildcats (2–2) – Game summary

Quarter	1	2	3	4	Total
Buffaloes	7	6	7	0	20
Wildcats	13	13	10	7	43

at Arizona Stadium • Tucson, AZ

- Date: October 1, 2022
- Game time: 6:30 p.m.
- Game weather: Cloudy, 81 °F (27 °C)
- Game attendance: 36,591
- Referee: Steven Strimling
- TV announcers (Pac-12 Network): J. B. Long (play-by-play), Max Browne (analyst)

Game information

First quarter

- (9:58) ARIZ – Michael Wiley 8-yard pass from Jayden de Laura, Tyler Loop kick (Drive: 11 plays, 75 yards, 5:02; Arizona 7–0)
- (6:35) COL – Owen McCown 1-yard run, Cole Becker kick (Drive: 9 plays, 70 yards, 3:23; Tied 7–7)
- (1:19) ARIZ – Jacob Cowing 3-yard pass from Jayden de Laura (Drive: 14 plays, 75 yards, 5:16; Arizona 13–7)

Second quarter

- (8:16) ARIZ – Dorian Singer 5-yard pass from Jayden de Laura (Drive: 4 plays, 60 yards, 1:11; Arizona 19–7)
- (3:42) ARIZ – Tanner McLachlan 8-yard pass from Jayden de Laura, Tyler Loop kick (Drive: 6 plays, 65 yards, 2:48; Arizona 26–7)
- (1:05) COL – Daniel Arias 14-yard pass from Owen McCown (Drive: 5 plays, 65 yards, 0:50; Arizona 26–13)

Third quarter

- (8:10) ARIZ – Tetairoa McMillan 23-yard pass from Jayden de Laura, Tyler Loop kick (Drive: 6 plays, 80 yards, 2:52; Arizona 33–13)
- (4:57) COL – Anthony Hankerson 7-yard run, Cole Becker kick (Drive: 7 plays, 75 yards, 3:13; Arizona 33–20)
- (1:22) ARIZ – Tyler Loop 29-yard field goal (Drive: 10 plays, 75 yards, 3:35; Arizona 36–20)

Fourth quarter

- (8:57) ARIZ – Michael Wiley 5-yard pass from Jayden de Laura, Tyler Loop kick (Drive: 11 plays, 57 yards, 4:32; Arizona 43–20)

Statistics	COL	ARIZ
First downs	19	36
Total yards	340	673
Rushes/yards	31–154	34–178
Passing yards	186	495
Passing: Comp–Att–Int	14–30–0	34–49–0
Time of possession	24:43	35:17

Team	Category	Player	Statistics
Colorado	Passing	Owen McCown	14/30, 186 yards, TD
Colorado	Rushing	Anthony Hankerson	12 carries, 68 yards, TD
Colorado	Receiving	Jordyn Tyson	1 reception, 42 yards
Arizona	Passing	Jayden de Laura	33/46, 484 yards, 6 TD
Arizona	Rushing	Michael Wiley	16 carries, 77 yards
Arizona	Receiving	Jacob Cowing	12 receptions, 180 yards, TD

=== vs No. 12 Oregon ===
No. 12 Oregon Ducks (4–1) vs Arizona Wildcats (3–2) – Game summary

Quarter	1	2	3	4	Total
No. 12 Ducks	7	21	21	0	49
Wildcats	3	10	3	6	22

at Arizona Stadium • Tucson, AZ

- Date: October 8, 2022
- Game time: 6:00 p.m.
- Game weather: Cloudy, 69 °F (21 °C)
- Game attendance: 50,800
- Referee: Chris Coyte
- TV announcers (Pac-12 Network): Ted Robinson (play-by-play), Yogi Roth (analyst)

Game information

First quarter

- (5:13) ARIZ – Tyler Loop 38-yard field goal (Drive: 9 plays, 44 yards, 3:40; Arizona 3–0)
- (2:53) ORE – Noah Whittington 55-yard run, Camden Lewis kick (Drive: 5 plays, 75 yards, 2:20; Oregon 7–3)

Second quarter

- (12:01) ORE – Bo Nix 2-yard run, Camden Lewis kick (Drive: 7 plays, 90 yards, 2:59; Oregon 14–3)
- (4:42) ORE – Moliki Matavao 3-yard run, Camden Lewis kick (Drive: 9 plays, 86 yards, 4:13; Oregon 21–3)
- (3:43) ARIZ – D. J. Williams 52-yard run, Tyler Loop kick (Drive: 2 plays, 75 yards, 0:59; Oregon 21–10)
- (0:34) ORE – Jordan James 1-yard run, Camden Lewis kick (Drive: 8 plays, 75 yards, 3:09; Oregon 28–10)
- (0:00) ARIZ – Tyler Loop 36-yard field goal (Drive: 5 plays, 56 yards, 0:34; Oregon 28–13)

Third quarter

- (11:13) ORE – Bo Nix 2-yard run, Camden Lewis kick (Drive: 8 plays, 75 yards, 3:47; Oregon 35–13)
- (9:44) ORE – Bucky Irving 23-yard run, Camden Lewis kick (Drive: 4 plays, 39 yards, 1:09; Oregon 42–13)
- (5:04) ORE – Bo Nix 25-yard run, Camden Lewis kick (Drive: 5 plays, 57 yards, 2:15; Oregon 49–13)
- (0:28) ARIZ – Tyler Loop 30-yard field goal (Drive: 5 plays, 18 yards, 1:00; Oregon 49–16)

Fourth quarter

- (9:51) ARIZ – Tetairoa McMillan 11-yard pass from Jayden de Laura (Drive: 10 plays, 85 yards, 4:20; Oregon 49–22)

Statistics	ORE	ARIZ
First downs	29	23
Total yards	580	356
Rushes/yards	41–306	25–115
Passing yards	274	241
Passing: Comp–Att–Int	23–29–0	24–42–1
Time of possession	33:19	26:41

Team	Category	Player	Statistics
Oregon	Passing	Bo Nix	20/25, 265 yards
Oregon	Rushing	Noah Whittington	6 carries, 92 yards, TD
Oregon	Receiving	Chase Cota	3 receptions, 60 yards
Arizona	Passing	Jayden de Laura	24/42, 241 yards, TD, INT
Arizona	Rushing	Jonah Coleman	9 carries, 74 yards
Arizona	Receiving	Jacob Cowing	6 receptions, 77 yards

=== at Washington ===
Arizona Wildcats (3–3) at Washington Huskies (4–2) – Game summary

Quarter	1	2	3	4	Total
Wildcats	7	7	10	15	39
Huskies	7	14	21	7	49

at Husky Stadium • Seattle, WA

- Date: October 15, 2022
- Game time: 2:30 p.m.
- Game weather: Sunny, 73 °F (23 °C)
- Game attendance: 63,189
- Referee: Francisco Villar
- TV announcers (Pac-12 Network): Ted Robinson (play-by-play), Yogi Roth (analyst)

Game information

First quarter

- (10:25) WASH – Jalen McMillan 23-yard pass from Michael Penix Jr., Peyton Henry kick (Drive: 5 plays, 46 yards, 2:45; Washington 7–0)
- (1:48) ARIZ – Tetairoa McMillan 46-yard pass from Jayden de Laura, Tyler Loop kick (Drive: 4 plays, 79 yards, 2:01; Tied 7–7)

Second quarter

- (13:46) WASH – Cameron Davis 1-yard run, Peyton Henry kick (Drive: 7 plays, 75 yards, 2:54; Washington 14–7)
- (2:23) ARIZ – Dorian Singer 39-yard pass from Jayden de Laura, Tyler Loop kick (Drive: 4 plays, 55 yards, 1:27; Tied 14–14)
- (0:08) WASH – Sam Adams II 4-yard pass from Michael Penix Jr., Peyton Henry kick (Drive: 12 plays, 75 yards, 2:15; Washington 21–14)

Third quarter

- (14:14) WASH – Rome Odunze 45-yard pass from Michael Penix Jr., Peyton Henry kick (Drive: 2 plays, 48 yards, 0:45; Washington 28–14)
- (12:16) ARIZ – Jonah Coleman 3-yard run, Tyler Loop kick (Drive: 4 plays, 75 yards, 1:58; Washington 28–21)
- (8:15) WASH – Michael Penix Jr. 8-yard run, Peyton Henry kick (Drive: 9 plays, 77 yards, 3:51; Washington 35–21)
- (4:01) ARIZ – Tyler Loop 48-yard field goal (Drive: 10 plays, 44 yards, 4:14; Washington 35–24)
- (1:56) WASH – Rome Odunze 48-yard pass from Michael Penix Jr., Peyton Henry kick (Drive: 6 plays, 75 yards, 2:05; Washington 42–24)

Fourth quarter

- (13:14) ARIZ – Tanner McLachlan 20-yard Jayden de Laura, Tyler Loop kick (Drive: 10 plays, 75 yards, 3:42; Washington 42–31)
- (9:51) ARIZ – Tetairoa McMillan 26-yard pass from Jayden de Laura, Jayden de Laura two-point pass to Jonah Coleman (Drive: 4 plays, 71 yards, 1:31; Washington 42–39)
- (5:30) WASH – Cameron Davis 19-yard run, Peyton Henry kick (Drive: 8 plays, 75 yards, 4:21; Washington 49–39)

Statistics	ARIZ	WASH
First downs	31	31
Total yards	526	595
Rushes/yards	33–126	29–79
Passing yards	400	516
Passing: Comp–Att–Int	25–35–0	36–44–0
Time of possession	28:45	31:15

Team	Category	Player	Statistics
Arizona	Passing	Jayden de Laura	25/34, 400 yards, 4 TD
Arizona	Rushing	Jonah Coleman	14 carries, 53 yards, TD
Arizona	Receiving	Tetairoa McMillan	7 receptions, 132 yards, 2 TD
Washington	Passing	Michael Penix Jr.	36/44, 516 yards, 4 TD
Washington	Rushing	Cameron Davis	8 carries, 41 yards, 2 TD
Washington	Receiving	Rome Odunze	9 receptions, 169 yards, 2 TD

=== vs No. 10 USC ===
No. 10 USC Trojans (6–1) vs Arizona Wildcats (3–4) – Game summary

Quarter	1	2	3	4	Total
No. 10 Trojans	10	7	14	14	45
Wildcats	10	3	16	8	37

at Arizona Stadium • Tucson, AZ

- Date: October 29, 2022
- Game time: 4:00 p.m.
- Game weather: Sunny, 79 °F (26 °C)
- Game attendance: 44,006
- Referee: Michael Mothershed
- TV announcers (Pac-12 Network): Ted Robinson (play-by-play), Yogi Roth (sideline)

Game information

First quarter

- (10:56) USC – Denis Lynch 45-yard field goal (Drive: 10 plays, 47 yards, 4:04; USC 3–0)
- (7:01) ARIZ – Dorian Singer 23-yard pass from Jayden de Laura, Tyler Loop kick (Drive: 8 plays, 75 yards, 3:55; Arizona 7–3)
- (2:57) USC – Raleek Brown 6-yard pass from Caleb Williams, Denis Lynch kick (Drive: 10 plays, 75 yards, 4:04; USC 10–7)
- (0:49) ARIZ – Tyler Loop 42-yard field goal (Drive: 7 plays, 50 yards, 2:08; Tied 10–10)

Second quarter

- (12:33) USC – Brenden Rice 2-yard pass from Caleb Williams, Denis Lynch kick (Drive: 8 plays, 75 yards, 3:16; USC 17–10)
- (6:59) ARIZ – Tyler Loop 25-yard field goal (Drive: 13 plays, 67 yards, 5:34; USC 17–13)

Third quarter

- (12:07) ARIZ – Tyler Loop 29-yard goal (Drive: 7 plays, 74 yards, 2:53; USC 17–16)
- (10:58) USC – Tahj Washington 5-yard pass from Caleb Williams, Denis Lynch kick (Drive: 4 plays, 75 yards, 1:09; USC 24–16)
- (5:08) USC – Tahj Washington 47-yard pass from Caleb Williams, Denis Lynch kick (Drive: 1 plays, 47 yards, 0:12; USC 31–16)
- (3:58) ARIZ – Dorian Singer 19-yard pass from Jayden de Laura, Tyler Loop kick (Drive: 4 plays, 60 yards, 1:10; USC 31–23)
- (1:42) ARIZ – Michael Wiley 10-yard run (Drive: 3 plays, 57 yards, 1:06; USC 31–29)

Fourth quarter

- (13:38) USC – Kyle Ford 5-yard pass from Caleb Williams, Denis Lynch kick (Drive: 9 plays, 75 yards, 3:04; USC 38–29)
- (6:24) USC – Travis Dye 2-yard run, Denis Lynch kick (Drive: 11 plays, 83 yards, 5:23; USC 45–29)
- (1:26) ARIZ – Dorian Singer 5-yard pass from Jayden de Laura, Jayden de Laura two-point pass to Jacob Cowing (Drive: 12 plays, 75 yards, 4:58; USC 45–37)

Statistics	USC	ARIZ
First downs	26	28
Total yards	621	543
Rushes/yards	32–210	26–163
Passing yards	411	380
Passing: Comp–Att–Int	31–45–0	26–43–1
Time of possession	30:51	29:09

Team	Category	Player	Statistics
USC	Passing	Caleb Williams	31/45, 411 yards, 5 TD
USC	Rushing	Travis Dye	20 carries, 113 yards, TD
USC	Receiving	Tahj Washington	7 receptions, 118 yards, 2 TD
Arizona	Passing	Jayden de Laura	26/43, 380 yards, 3 TD, INT
Arizona	Rushing	Jayden de Laura	8 carries, 54 yards
Arizona	Receiving	Dorian Singer	7 receptions, 141 yards, 3 TD

=== at No. 14 Utah ===
Arizona Wildcats (3–5) at No. 14 Utah Utes (6–2) – Game summary

Quarter	1	2	3	4	Total
Wildcats	7	3	0	10	20
No. 14 Utes	14	14	3	14	45

at Rice-Eccles Stadium • Salt Lake City, UT

- Date: November 5, 2022
- Game time: 5:30 p.m.
- Game weather: Cloudy, 46 °F (8 °C)
- Game attendance: 51,919
- Referee: Mike McCabe
- TV announcers (Pac-12 Network): Ted Robinson (play-by-play), Yogi Roth (analyst)

Game information

First quarter

- (8:53) UTAH – Jaylen Dixon 7-yard run, Jadon Redding kick (Drive: 6 plays, 37 yards, 2:26; Utah 7–0)
- (7:07) ARIZ – Jayden de Laura 3-yard run, Tyler Loop kick (Drive: 4 plays, 75 yards, 1:40; Tied 7–7)
- (1:35) UTAH – Nate Johnson 8-yard run, Jadon Redding kick (Drive: 11 plays, 75 yards, 5:32; Utah 14–7)

Second quarter

- (11:21) UTAH – Ja'Quinden Jackson 2-yard run, Jadon Redding kick (Drive: 5 plays, 60 yards, 2:41; Utah 21–7)
- (3:23) UTAH – Nate Johnson 9-yard run, Jadon Redding kick (Drive: 1 plays, 9 yards, 0:07; Utah 28–7)
- (0:44) ARIZ – Tyler Loop 30-yard field goal (Drive: 8 plays, 62 yards, 2:39; Utah 28–10)

Third quarter

- (4:31) UTAH – Jadon Redding 27-yard field goal (Drive: 9 plays, 41 yards, 4:49; Utah 31–10)

Fourth quarter

- (10:16) UTAH – Thomas Yassmin 12-yard pass from Cameron Rising, Jadon Redding kick (Drive: 10 plays, 61 yards, 4:49; Utah 37–10)
- (4:10) UTAH – Charlie Vincent 2-yard run, Jadon Redding kick (Drive: 7 plays, 43 yards, 4:29; Utah 45–10)
- (2:31) ARIZ – Team safety (Utah 45–12)
- (0:57) ARIZ – Tetairoa McMillan 2-yard pass from Noah Fifita, Noah Fifita two-point pass to Tetairoa McMillan (Drive: 5 plays, 58 yards, 1:29; Utah 45–20)

Statistics	ARIZ	UTAH
First downs	14	27
Total yards	387	457
Rushes/yards	25–156	55–306
Passing yards	231	151
Passing: Comp–Att–Int	15–30–0	13–25–0
Time of possession	22:01	37:59

Team	Category	Player	Statistics
Arizona	Passing	Jayden de Laura	10/20, 159 yards
Arizona	Rushing	Michael Wiley	6 carries, 64 yards
Arizona	Receiving	Tetairoa McMillan	4 receptions, 78 yards, TD
Utah	Passing	Cameron Rising	13/25, 151 yards, TD
Utah	Rushing	Ja'Quinden Jackson	13 carries, 97 yards, TD
Utah	Receiving	Devaughn Vele	5 receptions, 57 yards

=== at No. 12 UCLA ===
Arizona Wildcats (3–6) at No. 12 UCLA Bruins (8–1) – Game summary

Quarter	1	2	3	4	Total
Wildcats	14	7	0	13	34
No. 12 Bruins	0	14	7	7	28

at Rose Bowl • Pasadena, CA

- Date: November 12, 2022
- Game time: 7:30 p.m.
- Game weather: Clear, 58 °F (14 °C)
- Game attendance: 44,430
- Referee: Matthew Richards
- TV announcers (FOX): Noah Eagle (play-by-play), Mark Helfrich (analyst)

Game information

First quarter

- (8:47) ARIZ – Michael Wiley 10-yard run, Tyler Loop kick (Drive: 7 plays, 55 yards, 3:15; Arizona 7–0)
- (3:50) ARIZ – Michael Wiley 22-yard pass from Jayden de Laura, Tyler Loop kick (Drive: 7 plays, 63 yards, 3:01; Arizona 14–0)

Second quarter

- (13:12) UCLA – Zach Charbonnet 1-yard run, Nicholas Barr-Mira kick (Drive: 12 plays, 73 yards, 4:42; Arizona 14–7)
- (8:11) UCLA – Hudson Habermehl 51-yard pass from Dorian Thompson-Robinson, Nicholas Barr-Mira kick (Drive: 5 plays, 99 yards, 1:34; Tied 14–14)
- (2:01) ARIZ – Jayden de Laura 3-yard run, Tyler Loop kick (Drive: 10 plays, 75 yards, 6:10; Arizona 21–14)

Third quarter

- (3:38) UCLA – Zach Charbonnet 1-yard run, Nicholas Barr-Mira kick (Drive: 12 plays, 89 yards, 4:40; Tied 21–21)

Fourth quarter

- (13:20) ARIZ – Tyler Loop 35-yard field goal (Drive: 10 plays, 57 yards, 5:18; Arizona 24–21)
- (10:22) UCLA – Zach Charbonnet 5-yard run, Nicholas Barr-Mira kick (Drive: 9 plays, 65 yards, 2:58; UCLA 28–24)
- (6:34) ARIZ – Tetairoa McMillan 17-yard pass from Jayden de Laura, Tyler Loop kick (Drive: 8 plays, 82 yards, 3:41; Arizona 31–28)
- (1:07) ARIZ – Tyler Loop 23-yard field goal (Drive: 9 plays, 30 yards, 4:40; Arizona 34–28)

Statistics	ARIZ	UCLA
First downs	22	26
Total yards	436	465
Rushes/yards	36–124	37–220
Passing yards	312	245
Passing: Comp–Att–Int	23–29–0	26–39–0
Time of possession	34:20	25:40

Team	Category	Player	Statistics
Arizona	Passing	Jayden de Laura	22/28, 315 yards, 2 TD,
Arizona	Rushing	Michael Wiley	21 carries, 97 yards, TD
Arizona	Receiving	Jacob Cowing	9 receptions, 118 yards
UCLA	Passing	Dorian Thompson-Robinson	26/39, 245 yards, TD
UCLA	Rushing	Zach Charbonnet	24 carries, 181 yards, 3 TD
UCLA	Receiving	Hudson Habermehl	3 receptions, 64 yards, TD

=== vs Washington State ===
Washington State Cougars (6–4) vs Arizona Wildcats (4–6) – Game summary

Quarter	1	2	3	4	Total
Cougars	7	14	10	0	31
Wildcats	0	6	0	14	20

at Arizona Stadium • Tucson, AZ

- Date: November 19, 2022
- Game time: 11:00 a.m.
- Game weather: Sunny, 67 °F (19 °C)
- Game attendance: 40,717
- Referee: Francisco Villar
- TV announcers (Pac-12 Network): Jordan Kent (play-by-play), Max Browne (analyst)

Game information

First quarter

- (11:31) WSU – Nakia Watson 4-yard pass from Cameron Ward, Dean Janikowski kick (Drive: 11 plays, 75 yards, 3:29; Washington State 7–0)

Second quarter

- (9:06) WSU – Cameron Ward 17-yard run, Dean Janikowski kick (Drive: 7 plays, 60 yards, 2:45; Washington State 14–0)
- (6:38) ARIZ – Tyler Loop 38-yard field goal (Drive: 7 plays, 54 yards, 2:28; Washington State 14–3)
- (1:27) WSU – Nakia Watson 2-yard run, Dean Janikowski kick (Drive: 12 plays, 63 yards, 5:04; Washington State 21–3)
- (0:30) ARIZ – Tyler Loop 47-yard field goal (Drive: 7 plays, 45 yards, 0:57; Washington State 21–6)

Third quarter

- (4:45) WSU – Dean Janikowski 23-yard field goal (Drive: 6 plays, 13 yards, 2:20; Washington State 24–6)
- (4:09) WSU – Derrick Langford Jr. 35-yard interception return, Dean Janikowski kick (Drive: 2 plays, 3 yards, 0:36; Washington State 31–6)

Fourth quarter

- (10:41) ARIZ – Jayden de Laura 11-yard run, Tyler Loop kick (Drive: 8 plays, 66 yards, 2:41; Washington State 31–13)
- (1:16) ARIZ – Dorian Singer 47-yard pass from Jayden de Laura, Tyler Loop kick (Drive: 4 plays, 86 yards, 0:51; Washington State 31–20)

Statistics	WSU	ARIZ
First downs	22	19
Total yards	354	441
Rushes/yards	37–161	22–84
Passing yards	193	357
Passing: Comp–Att–Int	25–36–0	28–46–4
Time of possession	33:00	27:00

Team	Category	Player	Statistics
Washington State	Passing	Cam Ward	25/36, 193 yards, TD
Washington State	Rushing	Cameron Ward	8 carries, 59 yards, TD
Washington State	Receiving	Donovan Ollie	3 receptions, 53 yards
Arizona	Passing	Jayden de Laura	28/46, 357 yards, TD, 4 INT
Arizona	Rushing	Michael Wiley	7 carries, 50 yards
Arizona	Receiving	Dorian Singer	9 receptions, 176 yards, TD

=== vs Arizona State ===
Arizona State Sun Devils (3–8) vs Arizona Wildcats (4–7) – Game summary

Quarter	1	2	3	4	Total
Sun Devils	0	14	14	7	35
Wildcats	7	3	21	7	38

at Arizona Stadium • Tucson, AZ

- Date: November 25, 2022
- Game time: 1:00 p.m.
- Game weather: Sunny, 64 °F (18 °C)
- Game attendance: 49,865
- Referee: Steve Strimling
- TV announcers (FS1): Adam Alexander (play-by-play), Devin Gardner (analyst)

Game information

First quarter

- (8:51) ARIZ – Michael Wiley 51-yard run, Tyler Loop kick (Drive: 4 plays, 80 yards, 2:31; Arizona 7–0)

Second quarter

- (14:17) ARIZ – Tyler Loop 29-yard field goal (Drive: 10 plays, 28 yards, 3:28; Arizona 10–0)
- (10:35) ASU – Xazavian Valladay 4-yard run, Carter Brown kick (Drive: 10 plays, 75 yards, 3:42; Arizona 10–7)
- (0:58) ASU – Elijhah Badger 4-yard pass from Trenton Bourguet, Carter Brown kick (Drive: 16 plays, 80 yards, 5:24; Arizona State 14–10)

Third quarter

- (12:43) ARIZ – Jonah Coleman 9-yard run, Tyler Loop kick (Drive: 7 plays, 75 yards, 2:17; Arizona 17–14)
- (7:08) ASU – Giovanni Sanders 9-yard pass from Trenton Bourguet, Carter Brown kick (Drive: 11 plays, 72 yards, 5:29; Arizona State 21–17)
- (6:07) ASU – Michael Wiley 12-yard run, Tyler Loop kick (Drive: 3 plays, 75 yards, 1:01; Arizona 24–21)
- (4:00) ARIZ – Michael Wiley 72-yard run, Tyler Loop kick (Drive: 2 plays, 64 yards, 0:38; Arizona 31–21)
- (0:01) ASU – Xazavian Valladay 1-yard run, Carter Brown kick (Drive: 8 plays, 74 yards, 3:52; Arizona 31–28)

Fourth quarter

- (11:04) ASU – Jalin Conyers 4-yard pass from Trenton Bourguet, Carter Brown kick (Drive: 8 plays, 65 yards, 3:03; Arizona State 35–31)
- (8:53) ARIZ – D. J. Williams 1-yard run, Tyler Loop kick (Drive: 4 plays, 75 yards, 2:11; Arizona 38–35)

Statistics	ASU	ARIZ
First downs	39	18
Total yards	537	480
Rushes/yards	38–161	28–280
Passing yards	376	200
Passing: Comp–Att–Int	37–49–1	12–23–1
Time of possession	37:39	22:21

Team	Category	Player	Statistics
Arizona State	Passing	Trenton Bourguet	37/49, 376 yards, 3 TD, 2 INT
Arizona State	Rushing	Xazavian Valladay	24 carries, 97 yards, 2 TD
Arizona State	Receiving	Giovanni Sanders	8 receptions, 120 yards, TD
Arizona	Passing	Jayden de Laura	12/23, 200 yards, INT
Arizona	Rushing	Michael Wiley	12 carries, 214 yards, 3 TD
Arizona	Receiving	Dorian Singer	3 receptions, 91 yards

== Awards and honors ==
Pac-12 Weekly Honors
Date	Player	Position	Award	Ref.
Week 1	Jayden de Laura	QB	Offensive Player of the Week	
Week 1	Jalen Harris	DE	Defensive linemen of the Week	
Week 3	Hunter Echols	DL	Defensive lineman Player of the Week	
Week 5	Tetairoa McMillan	WR	Freshman Player of the Week	
Week 7	Tetairoa McMillan	WR	Freshman Player of the Week	
Week 11	Jacob Manu	LB	Freshman Player of the Week	

National Weekly Honors
Date	Player	Position	Award
November 14	Jayden de Laura	QB	Maxwell Award Player of the Week
November 14	Michael Wiley	RB	Earl Campbell Tyler Rose Award honorable mention

=== All-Pac 12 ===
All-Pac-12
Player	Position	1st/2nd team
Dorian Singer	WR	2nd
Jacob Cowing	WR	HM
Jayden de Laura	QB	HM
Michael Wiley	RB	HM
Tyler Loop	K	HM
Jordan Morgan	OL	HM
Jonah Savaiinaea	OL	HM
HM = Honorable mention. Source:
