= Shaun Aguano =

American football coach

Current position
- Title: Running backs coach
- Team: Arizona State
- Conference: Big 12

Biographical details
- Born: 1970 or 1971

Playing career
- 1988–1991: Linfield
- Position: Running back

Coaching career (HC unless noted)
- 2001–2010: Chandler HS (AZ) (assistant)
- 2011–2018: Chandler HS (AZ)
- 2019–present: Arizona State (RB)
- 2022: Arizona State (interim HC)

Head coaching record
- Overall: 88–19 (high school); 0–7 (college) (Note: The 2 wins were vacated because of NCAA violations.)

Shaun Aguano (born 1970 or 1971) is an American football coach and former player. He is the running backs coach at Arizona State University (ASU) and previously served as the interim head coach for the last 9 games of the 2022 season, taking over for Herm Edwards. Aguano had coached running backs at Arizona State since 2019. Prior to that, he spent eight years as the head football coach at Chandler High School in Chandler, Arizona, compiling a record of 88–19.

== Career ==
Aguano attended Kapaʻa High School in Kapaʻa, Hawaiʻi, on the island of Kauaʻi; he lettered in football, baseball, basketball, and track. After playing for Linfield College in McMinnville, Oregon, he returned to Kauai to serve as assistant football coach and head basketball coach at Kapaa before leaving in 1999.

Aguano then joined the coaching staff at Chandler High School, originally serving as a wide receivers coach before becoming offensive coordinator and assuming the head coach position in 2011 when head coach Jim Ewan retired. Under Aguano, the Chandler football program won four state titles in five years, including in each of Aguano's final three years; these were Chandler's first state titles since 1949. (Note: Prior to the late 1950s, no state football championships in Arizona were determined in title games.) During Aguano's tenure, players including Paul Perkins, N'Keal Harry, Chase Lucas, and Brett Hundley played at Chandler and went on to NFL careers. In addition, the program's profile was raised by the regular scheduling of out-of-state programs, with at least one such matchup in each year from 2013 to 2018. During his eight years at Chandler, his record was 88–19.

In 2019, Aguano joined the ASU football staff as running backs coach after what he described a five-minute interview with coach Herm Edwards, with whom he had previously worked on staff for the Under Armour All-America Game; according to Aguano, Edwards simply asked him, "You want the job?", which Aguano accepted. Arizona State named Aguano the interim head coach following the dismissal of Edwards on September 18, 2022. At that time, he was the second-longest-tenured assistant on the ASU staff.

After Aguano's first win, an upset victory over the Washington Huskies on October 8, the Arizona Football Coaches Association, representing more than 200 high school coaches from around the state, expressed support for Aguano getting the job on a full-time basis.

== Personal life ==
Aguano's wife, Kristin, was a teacher at Chandler High while he was coaching. They have four children.

== Head coaching record ==
=== College ===
| Year | Team | Overall | Conference | Standing | Bowl/playoffs |
|---|---|---|---|---|---|
Arizona State Sun Devils (Pac-12 Conference) (2022)
| 2022 | Arizona State | 0–7 (Note: Herm Edwards was Arizona State head coach for the first three games of the season before he was fired and Aguano was appointed interim head coach.) | 0–7 | T–9th | |
| Arizona State: | | 0–7 | 0–7 | | |
| Total: | | 2–7 | | | |
