= 2022 Arizona State Sun Devils football team =

American college football season

2022 Arizona State Sun Devils football
- Conference: Pac-12 Conference
- Record: 1–9, 2 wins vacated (0–7 Pac-12, 2 wins vacated)
- Head coach: Herm Edwards (5th season; first 3 games); Shaun Aguano (interim, remainder of the season)
- Offensive coordinator: Glenn Thomas (1st season)
- Offensive scheme: Spread
- Defensive coordinator: Donnie Henderson (1st season)
- Base defense: 3–4
- Home stadium: Sun Devil Stadium

Uniform
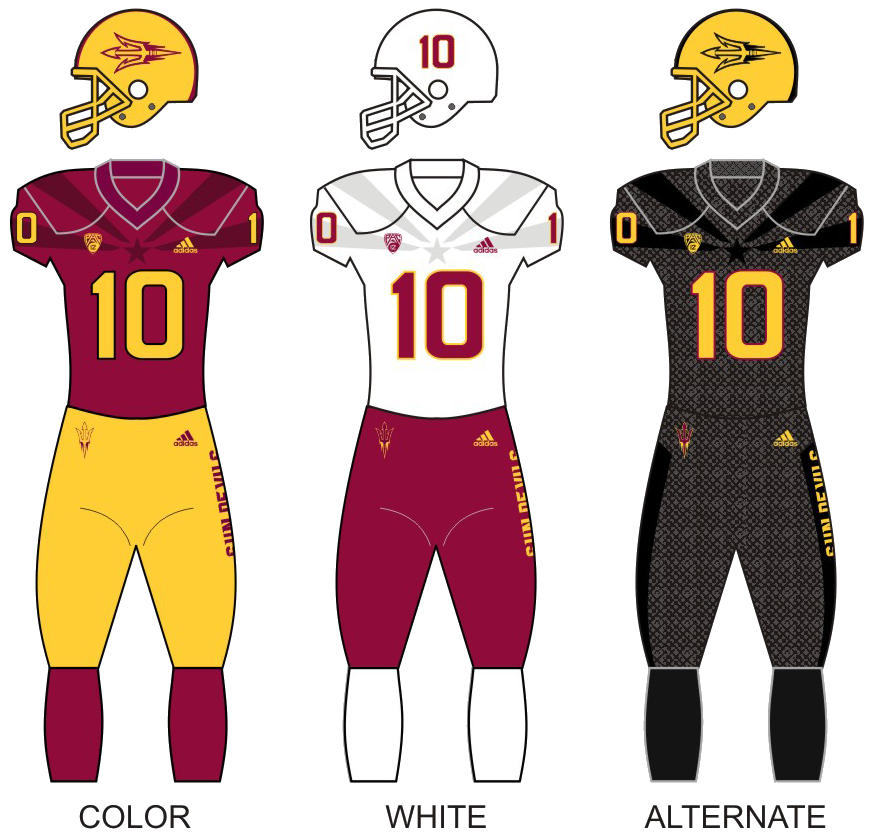

2022 Pac-12 Conference football standings
	Conf.			Overall
Team	W		L	W		L
No. 12 USC y	8	–	1	11	–	3
No. 10 Utah y$	7	–	2	10	–	4
No. 8 Washington	7	–	2	11	–	2
No. 15 Oregon	7	–	2	10	–	3
No. 17 Oregon State	6	–	3	10	–	3
No. 21 UCLA	6	–	3	9	–	4
Washington State	4	–	5	7	–	6
Arizona	3	–	6	5	–	7
California	2	–	7	4	–	8
Arizona State†	2	–	7	3	–	9
Stanford	1	–	8	3	–	9
Colorado	1	–	8	1	–	11
Championship: Utah 47, USC 24
$ – Conference champion; y – Championship game participant; Rankings from AP Poll

The 2022 Arizona State Sun Devils football team represented Arizona State University as a member of as a member of the Pac-12 Conference during the 2022 NCAA Division I FBS football season. After starting the season 1–2, head coach Herm Edwards was fired on September 18. Shaun Aguano took over as interim head coach. The Sun Devils played their home games at Sun Devil Stadium in Tempe Arizona. The Sun Devils went 3–9, their worst season since 1946. This season is also the worst attended season since 1968, averaging 43,081 for the six home games.

On April 19, 2024, Arizona State vacated 2 of their 3 wins due to NCAA violations stemming from Arizona State offering recruiting inducements, impermissible tryouts and tampering.

== Offseason ==
=== 2022 NFL draft ===
==== ASU players drafted into the NFL ====
Round	Pick	Player	Position	Team
3	91	Rachaad White	RB	Tampa Bay Buccaneers
4	121	Jack Jones	DB	New England Patriots
5	127	DJ Davidson	DT	New York Giants
7	237	Chase Lucas	DB	Detroit Lions

=== Recruiting class ===
The Sun Devils signed a total of 6 student–athletes on Early National Signing Day (December, 2021).

==== Recruits ====
College recruiting
Name	Hometown	School	Height	Weight	Commit date
Tevin White; RB	Stafford, VA	North Stafford High School	6 ft 1 in (1.85 m)	200 lb (91 kg)	Jun 24, 2021
Tevin White; RB	Recruit ratings: Rivals: 247Sports: ESPN: (83)				
Bennett Meredith; QB	Birmingham, AL	Hoover High School	6 ft 3 in (1.91 m)	190 lb (86 kg)	Dec 15, 2021
Bennett Meredith; QB	Recruit ratings: Rivals: 247Sports: ESPN: (76)				
Jacob Newell; TE	Springfield, OR	Thurston High School	6 ft 5 in (1.96 m)	225 lb (102 kg)	Nov 8, 2021
Jacob Newell; TE	Recruit ratings: Rivals: 247Sports: ESPN: (74)				
Bryce Pierre; TE	Rancho Cucamonga, CA	Chaffey College	6 ft 5 in (1.96 m)	235 lb (107 kg)	Dec 4, 2021
Bryce Pierre; TE	Recruit ratings: Rivals: 247Sports: ESPN: (74)				
Robby Harrison; DT	Greenwood, SC	Emerald High School	6 ft 3 in (1.91 m)	285 lb (129 kg)	Sep 27, 2021
Robby Harrison; DT	Recruit ratings: Rivals: 247Sports: ESPN: (74)				
Carter Brown; K	Pearland, TX	Dawson High School	6 ft 1 in (1.85 m)	185 lb (84 kg)	Nov 27, 2020
Carter Brown; K	Recruit ratings: Rivals: 247Sports: ESPN: (NR)				
Overall recruit ranking:
Note: In many cases, Scout, Rivals, 247Sports, On3, and ESPN may conflict in their listings of height and weight.; In these cases, the average was taken. ESPN grades are on a 100-point scale.; Sources: "Arizona State Football Commitment List". Rivals.; "2022 Player Commitments – Arizona State". ESPN.; "2022 Team Ranking". Rivals.com.; "2022 Arizona State Sun Devils football team". 247Sports.

=== Position key ===
Back	B	Center	C	Cornerback	CB	Defensive back	DB
Defensive end	DE	Defensive lineman	DL	Defensive tackle	DT	End	E
Fullback	FB	Guard	G	Halfback	HB	Kicker	K
Kickoff returner	KR	Offensive tackle	OT	Offensive lineman	OL	Linebacker	LB
Long snapper	LS	Punter	P	Punt returner	PR	Quarterback	QB
Running back	RB	Safety	S	Tight end	TE	Wide receiver	WR

=== Transfers ===
Outgoing

The Sun Devils lost 17 players via transfer portal prior to the 2022 season.

Name	No.	Pos.	Height	Weight	Year	Hometown	New school
Michael Turk	#25	P	6 ft 0 in (1.83 m)	230 pounds (100 kg)	(redshirt) Senior	Dallas, TX	Oklahoma
Cam Phillips	#15	DB	6 ft 1 in (1.85 m)	175 pounds (79 kg)	(redshirt) Sophomore	Houston, TX	TBD
Geordon Porter	#2	WR	6 ft 1 in (1.85 m)	190 pounds (86 kg)	(redshirt) Junior	Rancho Cucamonga, CA	New Mexico
DeaMonte Traynum	#1	RB	5 ft 11 in (1.80 m)	235 pounds (107 kg)	Sophomore	Akron, OH	Ohio State
Jordan Banks	#23	LB	6 ft 1 in (1.85 m)	245 pounds (111 kg)	(redshirt) Freshman	Harbor City, CA	Northwestern State
Tommi Hill	#6	DB	6 ft 0 in (1.83 m)	205 pounds (93 kg)	Freshman	Orlando, FL	Nebraska
Johnny Wilson	#14	WR	6 ft 7 in (2.01 m)	230 pounds (100 kg)	(redshirt) Freshman	Pacoima, CA	Florida State
Ricky Pearsall	#19	WR	6 ft 2 in (1.88 m)	210 pounds (95 kg)	Junior	Tempe, AZ	Florida
Jayden Daniels	#5	QB	6 ft 3 in (1.91 m)	185 pounds (84 kg)	Junior	San Bernardino, California	LSU
Eric Gentry	#18	LB	6 ft 6 in (1.98 m)	200 pounds (91 kg)	Freshman	Philadelphia, Pennsylvania	USC
LV Bunkley-Shelton	#3	WR	5 ft 11 in (1.80 m)	198 pounds (90 kg)	Sophomore	Gardena, California	Oklahoma
Jermayne Lole	#90	OL	6 ft 2 in (1.88 m)	270 pounds (120 kg)	Graduate	Long Beach, California	Louisville
Ezra Dotson-Oyetade	#52	LB	6 ft 3 in (1.91 m)	285 pounds (129 kg)	Freshman	Garland, Texas	TCU
Ethan Long	#7	QB	6 ft 2 in (1.88 m)	212 pounds (96 kg)	Sophomore	West Linn, Oregon	Abilene Christian
Lonyatta Alexander	#13	WR	6 ft 1 in (1.85 m)	212 pounds (96 kg)	Freshman	Burien, Washington	Washington
Sione Veikoso	#72	OT	6 ft 6 in (1.98 m)	212 pounds (96 kg)	Freshman	Kailua, Hawaii	BYU
Spencer Lovell	#76	OT	6 ft 7 in (2.01 m)	315 pounds (143 kg)	Senior	Fort Collins, Colorado	California

Incoming

Name	No.	Pos.	Height	Weight	Year	Hometown	Former school
Emory Jones	#5	QB	6 ft 2 in (1.88 m)	201 pounds (91 kg)	(redshirt) Senior	Lagrange, GA	Florida
Ro Torrence	#9	CB	6 ft 3 in (1.91 m)	210 pounds (95 kg)	(redshirt) Sophomore	Bessemer, AL	Auburn
Des Holmes	#75	OL	6 ft 5 in (1.96 m)	320 pounds (150 kg)	Graduate	Norristown, PA	Penn State
Chris Martinez	#53	OT	6 ft 4 in (1.93 m)	310 pounds (140 kg)	Graduate	Turlock, CA	San Diego State
Xazavian Valladay	#1	RB	6 ft 0 in (1.83 m)	200 pounds (91 kg)	Graduate	Chicago, IL	Wyoming
Paul Tyson	#9	QB	6 ft 5 in (1.96 m)	230 pounds (100 kg)	(redshirt) Junior	Birmingham, AL	Alabama
Nesta Jade Silvera	#4	DL	6 ft 2 in (1.88 m)	315 pounds (143 kg)	Graduate	Broward County, FL	Miami
Khoury Bethley	#15	DB	5 ft 11 in (1.80 m)	205 pounds (93 kg)	Graduate	Chino, CA	Hawaii
Joey Ramos	#69	QB	6 ft 5 in (1.96 m)	305 pounds (138 kg)	(redshirt) Junior	Phoenix, AZ	Iowa State
Cam Johnson	#7	WR	6 ft 0 in (1.83 m)	205 pounds (93 kg)	(redshirt) Junior	Nashville, TN	Vanderbilt
Chris Edmonds	#5	S	6 ft 2 in (1.88 m)	215 pounds (98 kg)	Junior	Phenix City, AL	Samford

== Preseason ==
=== Pac-12 Media Day ===
The Pac-12 Media Day was held in July, 2022 in Hollywood, California.

Predicted finish	Team	Votes (1st place)
1	Utah	384 (26)
2	Oregon	345 (2)
3	USC	341 (5)
4	UCLA	289
5	Oregon State	246
6	Washington	212
7	Washington State	177
8	Stanford	159
9	California	154
10	Arizona State	123
11	Arizona	86
12	Colorado	58

Media poll (Pac-12 Championship)
Rank	Team	Votes
1	Utah	26
2	Oregon	2
3	USC	5

=== Preseason All-Pac-12 teams ===
First team

Position	Player	Class	Team
First team offense
—	―	―	Arizona State
First team defense
―	―	―	Arizona State
First team special teams
RS	D.J. Taylor	RS So.	Arizona State

Second team

Position	Player	Class	Team
Second team offense
DL	LaDarius Henderson	Sr.	Arizona State
Second team defense
LB	Merlin Robertson	GS	Arizona State
Second team special teams
―	―	―	Arizona State

== Personnel ==
=== Roster ===
2022 Arizona State Sun Devils football team roster
Players
Coaches
Offense

Pos.	#	Name	Class
WR	0	Charles Hall	Sr
RB	1	Xazavian Valladay	GS
WR	2	Elijhah Badger	So
RB	4	Daniyel Ngata	So
QB	5	Emory Jones	Jr
WR	7	Cam Johnson	Jr
QB	7	Bennett Meredith	Fr
WR	8	Javen Jacobs	Fr
QB	9	Paul Tyson	Jr
QB	10	Finn Collins	Fr
TE	12	Jalin Conyers	So
TE	13	Bryce Pierre	Jr
WR	14	Zeek Freeman	Jr
QB	15	Daylin McLemore	So
QB	16	Trenton Bourguet	Jr
WR	17	Chad Johnson Jr.	So
WR	18	Patrick Williams II	Fr
QB	19	Max Clark	Fr
WR	20	Giovanni Sanders	Sr
WR	22	Bryan Thompson	GS
RB	23	Deonce Elliott	Fr
WR	24	Isaac Yates	Fr
RB	28	Tevin White	Fr
RB	29	Bryce Douglass	Fr
RB	39	George Hart	So
FB	44	Case Hatch	Sr
OL	53	Chris Martinez	GS
OL	55	Danny Valenzuela	So
OL	56	Matteo Ortiz	Jr
OL	57	Armon Bethea	Fr
OL	62	Matt Katergaris	Fr
OL	64	Ben Bray	So
OL	65	Kolbe Stuckwisch	So
OL	66	Ben Scott	Jr
OL	69	Joey Ramos	Jr
OL	70	Emmit Bohle	Sr
OL	71	Austin Barry	Fr
OL	73	Isaia Glass	So
OL	75	Des Holmes	GS
OL	76	Thomas Le Boucher	Jr
OL	77	LaDarius Henderson	Sr
OL	79	Ralph Frias	Sr
TE	80	Messiah Swinson	Jr
WR	81	Shawn Charles	Jr
WR	82	Andre Johnson	Jr
WR	83	Cooper Wallace	Fr
TE	84	Jack Cole	Fr
TE	85	Ryan Morgan	So
TE	87	Colby Garvin	Fr
TE	87	Justin Roehl	Fr
WR	87	Max Ware	Fr
WR	88	Coben Bourguet	Fr
TE	88	Jacob Newell	Fr
WR	89	Josh Hart	So

Defense

Pos.	#	Name	Class
DB	0	Isaiah Johnson	Fr
DB	1	Jordan Clark	Jr
DB	3	D. J. Taylor	So
DL	4	Nesta Jade Silvera	GS
DB	5	Chris Edmonds	Jr
DB	6	Macen Williams	So
DB	7	Timarcus Davis	Sr
LB	8	Merlin Robertson	Sr
DB	9	Ro Torrence	So
DB	10	Ed Woods	So
DB	12	Kejuan Markham	Sr
DB	13	Keon Markham	Jr
DB	15	Khoury Bethley	GS
LB	18	Connor Soelle	Jr
DB	19	Conner Lewis	So
DB	21	R. J. Regan	So
LB	22	Caleb McCullough	So
DB	23	Donovan Johnson	Fr
DB	24	Willie Harts	Jr
DB	25	Tarik Luckett	Jr
LB	28	Will Shaffer	So
DB	29	Alphonso Taylor	So
DB	31	Jean Boyd III	So
LB	32	Charlie Allen	Fr
LB	34	Kyle Soelle	Sr
DL	35	B.J. Green	So
DB	36	Alijah Gammage	Jr
DB	37	Saadite Green Jr.	Fr
DB	38	Damon Williamson	Jr
LB	41	Zach Bowers	Jr
DL	44	Tautala Pesefea	Sr
LB	46	Jared Behrens	Fr
LB	48	Spencer McKelligon	Fr
DL	49	Travez Moore	GS
LB	51	Dylan DeVito	Fr
LB	52	Jacob Jornadal	So
LB	53	Fritzney Niclass	So
DL	55	Omarr Norman-Lott	So
DL	58	Joe Moore	So
LB	66	James Djonkam	So
DL	90	Brandon McElroy	Jr
DL	91	Michael Matus	Sr
DL	92	B'Ahmad Miller	GS
DL	93	Robby Harrison	Fr
DL	94	Dylan Hall	Jr
DL	95	Matthew Pola-Mao	So
DL	96	Anthonie Cooper	Jr
DL	97	Blazen Lono-Wong	Fr
DL	98	Jalil Rivera-Harvey	So
DL	99	Gharin Stansbury	So

Special teams

Pos.	#	Name	Class
K	3	Carter Brown	Fr
K, P	17	Eddie Czaplicki	So
P	39	Adam Babb	Fr
LS	43	John Ferlmann	Fr
K	45	Jace Feely	Fr
P	47	Race Mahlum	So
LS	49	Gage King	So
K	97	Robert Liss	So

Head coach

- Herm Edwards

Coordinators/assistant coaches

- Glenn Thomas – Offensive coordinator/Quarterbacks
- Donnie Henderson – Defensive coordinator
- Shaun Aguano – Associate head coach/Running backs
- Brian Billick – Offensive analyst
- Marvin Lewis – Special assistant to the head coach
- Shawn Slocum – Special teams coordinator
- Mike Cavanaugh – Offensive line
- Chris Claiborne – Linebackers
- Aaron Fletcher – Defensive backs
- Robert Rodriguez – Defensive line
- Bobby Wade – Wide receivers
- Juston Wood – Tight ends
- Kyle Jacobo – Interim, running backs
- Joe Connolly – Director, Sports performance
- Colbert Calhoun – Assistant director of sports performance
- Clayton Kirven – Assistant director of sports performance
- Gabe Landa – Offensive analyst
- Steven Beard – Defensive analyst
- Mike Fletcher – Defensive analyst
- Marcus Lewis – Defensive analyst
- Shannon Forman – Graduate assistant
- Nick Harvey – Graduate assistant
- Caleb Moore – Graduate assistant
- Jack Tufono – Graduate assistant

Legend

- (C) Team captain
- (S) Suspended
- (I) Ineligible
- Injured
- Redshirt

Roster
Last update: 5/17/23

== Schedule ==
Date	Time	Opponent	Site	TV	Result	Attendance
September 1	7:00 p.m.	Northern Arizona*	Sun Devil Stadium; Tempe, AZ	P12N	W 40–3	44,764
September 10	4:30 p.m.	at No. 11 Oklahoma State*	Boone Pickens Stadium; Stillwater, OK	ESPN2	L 17–34	54,949
September 17	8:00 p.m.	Eastern Michigan*	Sun Devil Stadium; Tempe, AZ	P12N	L 21–30	43,788
September 24	8:30 p.m.	No. 13 Utah	Sun Devil Stadium; Tempe, AZ	ESPN	L 13–34	39,876
October 1	8:30 p.m.	at No. 6 USC	Los Angeles Memorial Coliseum; Los Angeles, CA	ESPN	L 25–42	62,133
October 8	1:00 p.m.	No. 21 Washington	Sun Devil Stadium; Tempe, AZ	P12N	W 45–38 (vacated)	39,244
October 22	1:00 p.m.	at Stanford	Stanford Stadium; Stanford, CA	P12N	L 14–15	25,061
October 29	4:30 p.m.	at Colorado	Folsom Field; Boulder, CO	ESPNU	W 42–34 (vacated)	40,334
November 5	7:30 p.m.	No. 12 UCLA	Sun Devil Stadium; Tempe, AZ	FS1	L 36–50	51,265
November 12	1:30 p.m.	at Washington State	Martin Stadium; Pullman, WA	P12N	L 18–28	24,039
November 19	12:15 p.m.	No. 23 Oregon State^{†}	Sun Devil Stadium; Tempe, AZ	ESPN2	L 7–31	39,551
November 25	1:00 p.m.	at Arizona	Arizona Stadium; Tucson, AZ (rivalry)	FS1	L 35–38	49,865
*Non-conference game; ^{†}Homecoming; Rankings from AP Poll (and CFP Rankings, after November 1) - Released prior to game; All times are in Mountain time

== Game summaries ==
=== vs Northern Arizona ===
Northern Arizona Lumberjacks (0–0) vs Arizona State Sun Devils (0–0) – Game summary

Quarter	1	2	3	4	Total
Lumberjacks	0	3	0	0	3
Sun Devils	3	21	13	3	40

at Sun Devil Stadium • Tempe, AZ

- Date: September 1, 2022
- Game time: 7:00 p.m.
- Game weather: Clear, 103 °F (39 °C)
- Game attendance: 44,764
- Referee: Michael Mothershed
- TV announcers (Pac-12 Network): Roxy Bernstein (play-by-play), Lincoln Kennedy (analyst)

Game information

First quarter

- (8:21) ASU – Carter Brown 27-yard field goal (Drive: 11 plays, 69 yards, 5:07; Arizona State 3–0)

Second quarter

- (8:05) ASU – Emory Jones 1-yard run, Carter Brown kick (Drive: 9 plays, 72 yards, 4:42; Arizona State 10–0)
- (3:44) ASU – Xazavian Valladay 4-yard run, Carter Brown kick (Drive: 6 plays, 75 yards, 2:39; Arizona State 17–0)
- (2:19) ASU – Emory Jones 17-yard run, Carter Brown kick (Drive: 2 plays, 45 yards, 0:30; Arizona State 24–0)
- (0:05) NAU – Collin Robbins 48-yard field goal (Drive: 4 plays, -2 yards, 0:54; Arizona State 24–3)

Third quarter

- (12:32) ASU – Xazavian Valladay 27-yard run, Carter Brown kick (Drive: 5 plays, 68 yards, 2:28; Arizona State 31–3)
- (9:42) ASU – Carter Brown 36-yard field goal (Drive: 4 plays, 6 yards, 1:16; Arizona State 34–3)
- (0:17) ASU – Carter Brown 44-yard field goal (Drive: 10 plays, 39 yards, 5:14; Arizona State 37–3)

Fourth quarter

- (7:54) ASU – Carter Brown 44-yard field goal (Drive: 10 plays, 55 yards, 5:43; Arizona State 40–3)

Statistics	NAU	ASU
First downs	7	24
Total yards	120	419
Rushes/yards	23–23	49–267
Passing yards	97	152
Passing: Comp–Att–Int	20–30–2	13–18–0
Time of possession	23:49	36:11

Team	Category	Player	Statistics
Northern Arizona	Passing	R. J. Martinez	18/28, 92 yards, 2 INT
Northern Arizona	Rushing	Draycen Hall	2 carries, 14 yards
Northern Arizona	Receiving	Coleman Owen	5 receptions, 24 yards
Arizona State	Passing	Emory Jones	13/18, 152 yards
Arizona State	Rushing	Xazavian Valladay	15 carries, 116 yards, 2 TD
Arizona State	Receiving	Messiah Swinson	3 receptions, 50 yards

=== at No. 11 Oklahoma State ===
Arizona State Sun Devils (1–0) at No. 11 Oklahoma State Cowboys (1–0) – Game summary

Quarter	1	2	3	4	Total
Sun Devils	3	0	7	7	17
No. 11 Cowboys	0	17	3	14	34

at Boone Pickens Stadium • Stillwater, OK

- Date: September 10, 2022
- Game time: 6:30 p.m. CST
- Game weather: Cloudy, 83 °F (28 °C)
- Game attendance: 54,949
- Referee: Steve Strimling
- TV announcers (ESPN2): Dave Flemming (play-by-play), Rod Gilmore (analyst), Tiffany Blackmon (sideline)

Game information

First quarter

- (9:00) ASU – Carter Brown 27-yard field goal (Drive: 8 plays, 78 yards, 3:41; Arizona State 3–0)

Second quarter

- (8:28) OKST – Dominic Richardson 3-yard run, Tanner Brown kick (Drive: 5 plays, 37 yards, 1:13; Oklahoma State 7–3)
- (2:45) OKST – Spencer Sanders 6-yard run, Tanner Brown kick (Drive: 12 plays, 96 yards, 3:07; Oklahoma State 14–3)
- (0:26) OKST – Tanner Brown 43-yard field goal (Drive: 6 plays, 14 yards, 1:25; Oklahoma State 17–3)

Third quarter

- (12:18) ASU – Xazavian Valladay 1-yard run, Carter Brown kick (Drive: 4 plays, 75 yards, 2:42; Oklahoma State 17–10)
- (5:48) OKST – Tanner Brown 24-yard field goal (Drive: 8 plays, 63 yards, 1:45; Oklahoma State 20–10)

Fourth quarter

- (14:25) ASU – Elijhah Badger 21-yard pass from Emory Jones, Carter Brown kick (Drive: 8 plays, 85 yards, 3:01; Oklahoma State 20–17)
- (13:31) OKST – Bryson Green 31-yard pass from Spencer Sanders, Tanner Brown kick (Drive: 3 plays, 65 yards, 0:54; Oklahoma State 27–17)
- (7:41) OKST – Ollie Gordon II 14-yard pass from Spencer Sanders, Tanner Brown kick (Drive: 13 plays, 80 yards, 5:19; Oklahoma State 34–17)

Statistics	ASU	OKST
First downs	13	30
Total yards	354	465
Rushes/yards	37–131	46–197
Passing yards	223	268
Passing: Comp–Att–Int	12–24–0	21–38–1
Time of possession	30:34	29:26

Team	Category	Player	Statistics
Arizona State	Passing	Emory Jones	12/24, 223 yards, TD
Arizona State	Rushing	Xazavian Valladay	21 carries, 118 yards, TD
Arizona State	Receiving	Giovanni Sanders	3 receptions, 94 yards
Oklahoma State	Passing	Spencer Sanders	21/38, 268 yards, 2 TD, INT
Oklahoma State	Rushing	Dominic Richardson	27 carries, 131 yards, TD
Oklahoma State	Receiving	Bryson Green	5 receptions, 83 yards, TD

=== vs Eastern Michigan ===
Eastern Michigan Eagles (1–1) vs Arizona State Sun Devils (1–1) – Game summary

Quarter	1	2	3	4	Total
Eagles	10	14	3	3	30
Sun Devils	0	14	0	7	21

at Sun Devil Stadium • Tempe, AZ

- Date: September 17, 2022
- Game time: 8:00 p.m.
- Game weather: Clear, 96 °F (36 °C)
- Game attendance: 43,778
- Referee: Matthew Richards
- TV announcers (Pac-12 Network): J. B. Long (play-by-play), Bob Davie (analyst)

Game information

First quarter

- (11:04) EMU – Jesus Gomez 27-yard field goal (Drive: 12 plays, 56 yards, 3:56; Eastern Michigan 3–0)
- (3:18) EMU – Jaylon Jackson 4-yard run, Jesus Gomez kick (Drive: 11 plays, 80 yards, 5:37; Eastern Michigan 10–0)

Second quarter

- (14:54) ASU – Andre Johnson 3-yard pass from Emory Jones, Carter Brown kick (Drive: 3 plays, 22 yards, 0:35; Eastern Michigan 10–7)
- (8:11) EMU – Hassan Beydoun 6-yard pass from Austin Smith, Jesus Gomez kick (Drive: 13 plays, 75 yards, 6:43; Eastern Michigan 17–7)
- (2:53) ASU – Emory Jones 3-yard run, Carter Brown kick (Drive: 11 plays, 75 yards, 5:18; Eastern Michigan 17–14)
- (1:12) EMU – Samson Evans 3-yard run, Jesus Gomez kick (Drive: 8 plays, 79 yards, 1:41; Eastern Michigan 24–14)

Third quarter

- (7:04) EMU – Jesus Gomez 40-yard field goal (Drive: 7 plays, 39 yards, 2:41; Eastern Michigan 27–14)

Fourth quarter

- (10:48) ASU – Xazavian Valladay 44-yard run, Carter Brown kick (Drive: 5 plays, 80 yards, 1:34; Eastern Michigan 27–21)
- (4:24) EMU – Jesus Gomez 20-yard field goal (Drive: 9 plays, 73 yards, 5:44; Eastern Michigan 30–21)

Statistics	EMU	ASU
First downs	25	18
Total yards	458	352
Rushes/yards	51–305	23–170
Passing yards	153	182
Passing: Comp–Att–Int	14–22–1	20–32–0
Time of possession	34:43	25:17

Team	Category	Player	Statistics
Eastern Michigan	Passing	Taylor Powell	10/14, 93 yards, INT
Eastern Michigan	Rushing	Samson Evans	36 carries, 258 yards, TD
Eastern Michigan	Receiving	Tanner Knue	3 receptions, 53 yards
Arizona State	Passing	Emory Jones	20/32, 182 yards, TD
Arizona State	Rushing	Xazavian Valladay	16 carries, 127 yards, TD
Arizona State	Receiving	Elijhah Badger	7 receptions, 88 yards

=== vs No. 13 Utah ===
No. 13 Utah Utes (2–1) vs Arizona State Sun Devils (1–2) – Game summary

Quarter	1	2	3	4	Total
No. 13 Utes	14	10	7	3	34
Sun Devils	0	6	0	7	13

at Sun Devil Stadium • Tempe, AZ

- Date: September 24, 2022
- Game time: 7:30 p.m.
- Game weather: Clear, 96 °F (36 °C)
- Game attendance: 39,876
- Referee: Francisco Villar
- TV announcers (ESPN): Dave Pasch (play-by-play), Dusty Dvoracek (analyst), Tom Luginbill (sideline)

Game information

First quarter

- (11:41) UTAH – Dalton Kincaid 29-yard pass from Cameron Rising, Jordon Noyes kick (Drive: 2 plays, 53 yards, 0:22; Utah 7–0)
- (3:16) UTAH – Dalton Kincaid 6-yard pass from Cameron Rising, Jordon Noyes kick (Drive: 14 plays, 70 yards, 6:15; Utah 14–0)

Second quarter

- (7:03) UTAH – Jordan Noyes 23-yard field goal (Drive: 8 plays, 26 yards, 4:03; Utah 17–0)
- (4:45) ASU – Carter Brown 36-yard field goal (Drive: 6 plays, 24 yards, 2:18; Utah 17–3)
- (0:44) UTAH – Ja'Quinden Jackson 2-yard run, Jordon Noyes kick (Drive: 10 plays, 75 yards, 4:01; Utah 24–3)
- (0:00) ASU – Carter Brown 47-yard field goal (Drive: 6 plays, 24 yards, 0:44; Utah 24–6)

Third quarter

- (6:16) UTAH – Jaylen Dixon 11-yard run, Jordon Noyes kick (Drive: 9 plays, 74 yards, 3:56; Utah 31–6)

Fourth quarter

- (10:49) UTAH – Jordan Noyes 28-yard field goal (Drive: 9 plays, 24 yards, 4:11; Utah 34–6)
- (2:06) ASU – Messiah Swinson 11-yard pass from Emory Jones, Carter Brown kick (Drive: 10 plays, 45 yards, 3:23; Utah 34–13)

Statistics	UTAH	ASU
First downs	26	15
Total yards	465	267
Rushes/yards	45–205	20–6
Passing yards	260	261
Passing: Comp–Att–Int	19–29–1	21–36–2
Time of possession	35:33	24:27

Team	Category	Player	Statistics
Utah	Passing	Cameron Rising	19/29, 260 yards, 2 TD, INT
Utah	Rushing	Tavion Thomas	11 carries, 60 yards
Utah	Receiving	Thomas Yassmin	1 reception, 72 yards
Arizona State	Passing	Emory Jones	21/36, 261 yards, TD, INT
Arizona State	Rushing	Xazavian Valladay	8 carries, 30 yards
Arizona State	Receiving	Elijhah Badger	5 receptions, 76 yards

=== at No. 6 USC ===
Arizona State Sun Devils (1–3) at No. 6 USC Trojans (4–0) – Game summary

Quarter	1	2	3	4	Total
Sun Devils	7	10	0	8	25
No. 6 Trojans	14	7	7	14	42

at Los Angeles Memorial Coliseum • Los Angeles, CA

- Date: October 1, 2022
- Game time: 7:30 p.m.
- Game weather: Clear, 66 °F (19 °C)
- Game attendance: 62,133
- Referee: Chris Coyte
- TV announcers (ESPN): Dave Flemming (play-by-play), Rod Gilmore (analyst), Tiffany Blackmon (sideline)

Game information

First quarter

- (10:28) USC – Caleb Williams 1-yard run, Denis Lynch kick (Drive: 9 plays, 75 yards, 4:32; USC 7–0)
- (6:28) ASU – Xazavian Valladay 29-yard pass from Emory Jones, Carter Brown kick (Drive: 8 plays, 74 yards, 4:00; Tied 7–7)
- (1:52) USC – Mario Williams 7-yard pass from Caleb Williams, Denis Lynch kick (Drive: 10 plays, 75 yards, 4:36; USC 14–7)

Second quarter

- (9:53) ASU – Carter Brown 40-yard field goal (Drive: 12 plays, 53 yards, 6:59; USC 14–10)
- (6:05) USC – Malcolm Epps 4-yard pass from Caleb Williams, Denis Lynch kick (Drive: 10 plays, 94 yards, 3:48; USC 21–10)
- (2:27) ASU – Emory Jones 6-yard run, Denis Lynch kick (Drive: 7 plays, 75 yards, 3:38; USC 21–17)

Third quarter

- (1:10) USC – Travis Dye 2-yard run, Denis Lynch kick (Drive: 9 plays, 50 yards, 5:28; USC 28–17)

Fourth quarter

- (10:54) USC – Kyron Hudson 2-yard pass from Caleb Williams, Denis Lynch kick (Drive: 8 plays, 60 yards, 3:20; USC 35–17)
- (6:16) ASU – Xazavian Valladay 2-yard run, Emory Jones two-point pass to Xazavian Valladay (Drive: 10 plays, 75 yards, 4:38; USC 35–25)
- (3:46) USC – Travis Dye 1-yard run, Denis Lynch kick (Drive: 5 plays, 39 yards, 2:30; USC 42–25)

Statistics	ASU	USC
First downs	20	29
Total yards	331	485
Rushes/yards	29–88	30–137
Passing yards	243	348
Passing: Comp–Att–Int	23–32–1	27–37–1
Time of possession	29:55	30:05

Team	Category	Player	Statistics
Arizona State	Passing	Emory Jones	23/32, 243 yards, TD, INT
Arizona State	Rushing	Xazavian Valladay	13 carries, 64 yards, TD
Arizona State	Receiving	Bryan Thompson	5 receptions, 86 yards
USC	Passing	Caleb Williams	27/37, 348 yards, 3 TD, INT
USC	Rushing	Travis Dye	13 carries, 62 yards, 2 TD
USC	Receiving	Jordan Addison	8 receptions, 105 yards

=== vs No. 21 Washington ===
No. 21 Washington Huskies (4–1) vs Arizona State Sun Devils (1–4) – Game summary

Quarter	1	2	3	4	Total
No. 21 Huskies	7	10	14	7	38
Sun Devils	3	21	14	7	45

at Sun Devil Stadium • Tempe, AZ

- Date: October 8, 2022
- Game time: 1:00 p.m.
- Game weather: Clear, 73 °F (23 °C)
- Game attendance: 39,244
- Referee: Michael Mothershed
- TV announcers (Pac-12 Network): J. B. Long (play-by-play), Lincoln Kennedy (analyst)

Game information

First quarter

- (10:29) WASH – Michael Penix Jr. 1-yard run, Peyton Henry kick (Drive: 12 plays, 75 yards, 4:31; Washington 7–0)
- (3:57) ASU – Carter Brown 53-yard field goal (Drive: 12 plays, 40 yards, 6:32; Washington 7–3)

Second quarter

- (13:15) WASH – Peyton Henry 27-yard field goal (Drive: 14 plays, 65 yards, 5:42; Washington 10–3)
- (8:45) ASU – Xazavian Valladay 11-yard run, Carter Brown kick (Drive: 10 plays, 75 yards, 4:30; Tied 10–10)
- (3:47) ASU – Xazavian Valladay 14-yard pass from Trenton Bourguet, Carter Brown kick (Drive: 11 plays, 90 yards, 4:03; Arizona State 17–10)
- (2:51) ASU – Jordan Clark 38-yard interception return, Carter Brown kick (Drive: 3 plays, 15 yards, 0:50; Arizona State 24–10)
- (0:34) WASH – Wayne Taulapapa 1-yard run, Peyton Henry kick (Drive: 9 plays, 75 yards, 2:17; Arizona State 24–17)

Third quarter

- (8:57) ASU – Elijhah Badger 10-yard pass from Trenton Bourguet, Carter Brown kick (Drive: 5 plays, 29 yards, 2:40; Arizona State 31–17)
- (6:36) WASH – Cameron Davis 4-yard run, Peyton Henry kick (Drive: 6 plays, 75 yards, 2:21; Arizona State 31–24)
- (4:45) ASU – Daniyel Ngata 1-yard run, Carter Brown kick (Drive: 5 plays, 79 yards, 1:46; Arizona State 38–24)
- (0:36) WASH – Cameron Davis 1-yard run, Peyton Henry kick (Drive: 12 plays, 75 yards, 4:09; Arizona State 38–31)

Fourth quarter

- (12:09) WASH – Cameron Davis 5-yard run, Peyton Henry kick (Drive: 5 plays, 53 yards, 2:39; Tied 38–38)
- (7:27) ASU – Elijhah Badger 2-yard pass from Trenton Bourguet, Carter Brown kick (Drive: 10 plays, 82 yards, 4:35; Arizona State 45–38)

Statistics	WASH	ASU
First downs	32	23
Total yards	458	397
Rushes/yards	33–134	32–156
Passing yards	324	241
Passing: Comp–Att–Int	34–54–1	22–30–1
Time of possession	31:57	28:03

Team	Category	Player	Statistics
Washington	Passing	Michael Penix Jr.	33/53, 311 yards, INT
Washington	Rushing	Cameron Davis	9 carries, 77 yards, 3 TD
Washington	Receiving	Rome Odunze	9 receptions, 115 yards
Arizona State	Passing	Trenton Bourguet	15/21, 182 yards, 3 TD, INT
Arizona State	Rushing	Xazavian Valladay	23 carries, 111 yards, TD
Arizona State	Receiving	Bryan Thompson	3 receptions, 78 yards

=== at Stanford ===
Arizona State Sun Devils (2–4) at Stanford Cardinal (2–4) – Game summary

Quarter	1	2	3	4	Total
Sun Devils	7	7	0	0	14
Cardinal	6	0	3	6	15

at Stanford Stadium • Stanford, CA

- Date: October 22, 2022
- Game time: 1:00 p.m.
- Game weather: Cloudy, 67 °F (19 °C)
- Game attendance: 25,061
- Referee: Matthew Richard
- TV announcers (Pac-12 Network): J. B. Long (play-by-play), Yogi Roth (analyst)

Game information

First quarter

- (10:00) STAN – Joshua Karty 44-yard field goal (Drive: 9 plays, 44 yards, 3:42; Stanford 3–0)
- (6:47) ASU – Xazavian Valladay 15-yard run, Carter Brown kick (Drive: 6 plays, 75 yards, 3:13; Arizona State 7–3)
- (1:55) STAN – Joshua Karty 36-yard field goal (Drive: 11 plays, 57 yards, 4:52; Arizona State 7–6)

Second Quarter

- (14:01) ASU – Elijhah Badger 39-yard pass from Emory Jones, Carter Brown kick (Drive: 7 plays, 75 yards, 2:54; Arizona State 14–6)

Third quarter

- (6:08) STAN – Joshua Karty 44-yard field goal (Drive: 8 plays, 21 yards, 2:50; Arizona State 14–9)

Fourth quarter

- (14:52) STAN – Joshua Karty 36-yard field goal (Drive: 9 plays, 67 yards, 2:27; Arizona State 14–12)
- (6:28) STAN – Joshua Karty 47-yard field goal (Drive: 15 plays, 70 yards, 5:05; Stanford 15–14)

Statistics	ASU	STAN
First downs	19	28
Total yards	355	398
Rushes/yards	34–128	25–78
Passing yards	227	320
Passing: Comp–Att–Int	14–26–1	33–58–1
Time of possession	28:22	31:38

Team	Category	Player	Statistics
Arizona State	Passing	Emory Jones	14/25, 227 yards, TD, INT
Arizona State	Rushing	Xazavian Valladay	18 carries, 76 yards, TD
Arizona State	Receiving	Elijhah Badger	6 receptions, 118 yards, TD
Stanford	Passing	Tanner McKee	33/57, 320 yards, INT
Stanford	Rushing	Casey Filkins	8 carries, 48 yards
Stanford	Receiving	John Humphreys	8 receptions, 90 yards

=== at Colorado ===
Arizona State Sun Devils (2–5) at Colorado Buffaloes (1–6) – Game summary

Quarter	1	2	3	4	Total
Sun Devils	14	14	7	7	42
Buffaloes	3	14	3	14	34

at Folsom Field • Boulder, CO

- Date: October 29, 2022
- Game time: 5:30 p.m. MST
- Game weather: Sunny, 50 °F (10 °C)
- Game attendance: 54,949
- Referee: Steve Strimling
- TV announcers (ESPNU): Drew Carter (play-by-play), Rene Ingoglia (analyst)

Game information

First quarter

- (10:37) ASU – Xazavian Valladay 3-yard run, Carter Brown kick (Drive: 8 plays, 64 yards, 3:23; Arizona State 7–0)
- (5:51) COL – Cole Becker 49-yard field goal (Drive: 10 plays, 44 yards, 4:46; Arizona State 7–3)
- (2:39) ASU – Jalin Conyers 12-yard pass from Trenton Bourguet, Carter Brown kick (Drive: 7 plays, 75 yards, 3:12; Arizona State 14–3)

Second quarter

- (10:52) COL – Montana Lemonious-Craig 7-yard pass from J. T. Shrout, Cole Becker kick (Drive: 7 plays, 52 yards, 3:14; Arizona State 14–10)
- (7:59) ASU – Xazavian Valladay 42-yard run, Carter Brown kick (Drive: 7 plays, 75 yards, 2:43; Arizona State 21–10)
- (3:16) COL – Jordyn Tyson 58-yard pass from J. T. Shrout, Cole Becker kick (Drive: 4 plays, 67 yards, 1:57; Arizona State 21–17)
- (0:55) ASU – Xazavian Valladay 1-yard run, Carter Brown kick (Drive: 9 plays, 75 yards, 2:21; Arizona State 28–17)

Third quarter

- (8:11) ASU – Jalin Conyers 5-yard pass from Trenton Bourguet, Carter Brown kick (Drive: 9 plays, 53 yards, 3:51; Arizona State 35–17)
- (3:47) COL – Cole Becker 27-yard field goal (Drive: 7 plays, 35 yards, 1:56; Arizona State 35–20)

Fourth quarter

- (12:40) ASU – Jalin Conyers 20-yard pass from Trenton Bourguet, Carter Brown kick (Drive: 7 plays, 88 yards, 3:37; Arizona State 42–20)
- (8:12) COL – Deion Smith 1-yard run, Cole Becker kick (Drive: 14 plays, 71 yards, 4:21; Arizona State 42–27)
- (3:50) COL – Jordyn Tyson 88-yard punt return, Cole Becker kick (Drive: 5 plays, 23 yards, 4:22; Arizona State 42–34)

Statistics	ASU	COL
First downs	22	20
Total yards	557	359
Rushes/yards	33–122	35–137
Passing yards	435	222
Passing: Comp–Att–Int	32–43–1	13–34–1
Time of possession	33:21	26:39

Team	Category	Player	Statistics
Arizona State	Passing	Trenton Bourguet	32/43, 435 yards, 3 TD, INT
Arizona State	Rushing	Xazavian Valladay	23 carries, 118 yards, 3 TD
Arizona State	Receiving	Elijhah Badger	8 receptions, 137 yards
Colorado	Passing	J. T. Shrout	13/34, 222 yards, 2 TD, INT
Colorado	Rushing	Deion Smith	24 carries, 111 yards, TD
Colorado	Receiving	Jordyn Tyson	5 receptions, 115 yards, TD

=== vs No. 12 UCLA ===
No. 12 UCLA Bruins (7–1) vs Arizona State Sun Devils (3–5) – Game summary

Quarter	1	2	3	4	Total
No. 12 Bruins	14	14	14	8	50
Sun Devils	10	0	15	11	36

at Sun Devil Stadium • Tempe, AZ

- Date: November 5, 2022
- Game time: 7:40 pm
- Game weather: Clear, 70 °F (21 °C)
- Game attendance: 51,265
- Referee: Francisco Villar
- TV announcers (FS1): Noah Eagle (play-by-play), Mark Helfrich (analyst)

Game information

First quarter

- (11:19) ASU – Carter Brown 25-yard field goal (Drive: 8 plays, 33 yards, 3:33; Arizona State 3–0)
- (8:54) UCLA – Dorian Thompson-Robinson 14-yard run, Nicholas Barr-Mira kick (Drive: 7 plays, 75 yards, 2:25; UCLA 7–3)
- (2:41) ASU – Messiah Swinson 3-yard pass from Trenton Bourguet, Carter Brown kick (Drive: 12 plays, 75 yards, 6:07; Arizona State 10–7)
- (0:32) UCLA – Keegan Jones 3-yard pass from Dorian Thompson-Robinson, Nicholas Barr-Mira kick (Drive: 5 plays, 77 yards, 2:01; UCLA 14–10)

Second quarter

- (9:43) UCLA – Keegan Jones 10-yard run, Nicholas Barr-Mira kick (Drive: 5 plays, 91 yards, 1:43; UCLA 21–10)
- (0:33) UCLA – Michael Ezeike 9-yard pass from Dorian Thompson-Robinson, Nicholas Barr-Mira kick (Drive: 16 plays, 90 yards, 5:48; UCLA 28–10)

Third quarter

- (10:03) UCLA – Dorian Thompson-Robinson 4-yard run, Nicholas Barr-Mira kick (Drive: 10 plays, 65 yards, 3:16; UCLA 35–10)
- (6:15) ASU – Elijhah Badger 7-yard pass from Trenton Bourguet, Trenton Bourguet two-point pass to Xazavian Valladay (Drive: 8 plays, 75 yards, 3:48; UCLA 35–18)
- (6:03) UCLA – Kazmeir Allen 75-yard run, Nicholas Barr-Mira kick (Drive: 1 plays, 75 yards, 0:12; UCLA 42–18)
- (0:30) ASU – Xazavian Valladay 1-yard run, Carter Brown kick (Drive: 10 plays, 75 yards, 5:33; UCLA 42–25)

Fourth quarter

- (11:09) ASU – Carter Brown 36-yard field goal (Drive: 7 plays, 36 yards, 3:22; UCLA 42–28)
- (6:24) ASU – Xazavian Valladay 1-yard run, Trenton Bourguet two-point pass to Andre Johnson (Drive: 8 plays, 69 yards, 2:34; UCLA 42–36)
- (2:30) UCLA – Colson Yankoff 1-yard run, Dorian Thompson-Robinson two-point pass to Titus Mokiao-Atimalala (Drive: 7 plays, 74 yards, 3:48; UCLA 50–36)

Statistics	UCLA	ASU
First downs	24	30
Total yards	571	468
Rushes/yards	42–402	31–119
Passing yards	169	349
Passing: Comp–Att–Int	13–20–1	38–49–1
Time of possession	23:48	36:12

Team	Category	Player	Statistics
UCLA	Passing	Dorian Thompson-Robinson	13/20, 169 yards, 2 TD, INT
UCLA	Rushing	Kazmeir Allen	11 carries, 137 yards, TD
UCLA	Receiving	Jake Bobo	3 receptions, 64 yards
Arizona State	Passing	Trenton Bourguet	38/49, 349 yards, 2 TD, INT
Arizona State	Rushing	Xazavian Valladay	20 carries, 92 yards, 2 TD
Arizona State	Receiving	Xazavian Valladay	10 receptions, 89 yards

=== at Washington State ===
Arizona State Sun Devils (3–6) at Washington State Cougars (5–4) – Game summary

Quarter	1	2	3	4	Total
Sun Devils	0	0	6	12	18
Cougars	13	15	0	0	28

at Martin Stadium • Pullman, WA

- Date: November 12, 2022
- Game time: 12:30 p.m. PST
- Game weather: Sunny, 38 °F (3 °C)
- Game attendance: 24,039
- Referee: Chris Coyte
- TV announcers (Pac-12 Network): Roxy Bernstein (play-by-play), Lincoln Kennedy (analyst)

Game information

First quarter

- (6:31) WSU – Nakia Watson 2-yard run, Dean Janikowski kick (Drive: 9 plays, 39 yards, 3:02; Washington State 7–0)
- (3:59) WSU – Leyton Smithson 2-yard pass from Cameron Ward (Drive: 7 plays, 84 yards, 1:41; Washington State 13–0)

Second quarter

- (7:43) WSU – Nakia Watson 5-yard run, Cameron Ward two-point pass to Leyton Smithson (Drive: 2 plays, 4 yards, 0:30; Washington State 21–0)
- (0:03) WSU – Nakia Watson 2-yard run, Dean Janikowski kick (Drive: 13 plays, 75 yards, 3:08; Washington State 28–0)

Third quarter

- (0:51) ASU – Jalin Conyers 47-yard pass from Emory Jones (Drive: 4 plays, 52 yards, 1:09; Washington State 28–6)

Fourth quarter

- (4:10) ASU – Xazavian Valladay 1-yard run (Drive: 4 plays, 43 yards, 1:24; Washington State 28–12)
- (0:57) ASU – Elijhah Badger 9-yard pass from Emory Jones (Drive: 5 plays, 63 yards, 1:20; Washington State 28–18)

Statistics	ASU	WSU
First downs	18	19
Total yards	333	356
Rushes/yards	34–121	35–137
Passing yards	212	219
Passing: Comp–Att–Int	18–33–1	22–37–0
Time of possession	33:13	26:47

Team	Category	Player	Statistics
Arizona State	Passing	Emory Jones	15/23, 186 yards, 2 TD
Arizona State	Rushing	Xazavian Valladay	21 carries, 134 yards, TD
Arizona State	Receiving	Xazavian Valladay	6 receptions, 55 yards
Washington State	Passing	Cam Ward	22/37, 219 yards, 2 TD
Washington State	Rushing	Nakia Watson	20 carries, 116 yards, 3 TD
Washington State	Receiving	De'Zhaun Stribling	5 receptions, 64 yards

=== vs No. 23 Oregon State ===
No. 23 Oregon State Beavers (7–3) vs Arizona State Sun Devils (3–7) – Game summary

Quarter	1	2	3	4	Total
No. 23 Beavers	7	7	14	3	31
Sun Devils	0	7	0	0	7

at Sun Devil Stadium • Tempe, AZ

- Date: November 19, 2022
- Game time: 12:15 p.m.
- Game weather: Sunny, 71 °F (22 °C)
- Game attendance: 39,551
- Referee: Matthew Richards
- TV announcers (ESPN2): Anish Shroff (play-by-play), Brock Osweiler (analyst), Taylor McGregor (sideline)

Game information

First quarter

- (8:22) OSU – Damien Martinez 5-yard run, Everett Hayes kick (Drive 9 plays, 78 yards, 4:44; Oregon State 7–0)

Second quarter

- (1:53) ASU – Xazavian Valladay 11-yard run, Jace Feely kick (Drive 7 plays, 67 yards, 3:00; Tied 7–7)
- (1:00) OSU – Jack Velling 21-yard pass from Ben Gulbranson, Everett Hayes kick (Drive 4 plays, 75 yards, 0:53; Oregon State 14–7)

Third quarter

- (9:43) OSU – Damien Martinez 12-yard run, Everett Hayes kick (Drive 10 plays, 83 yards, 5:10; Oregon State 21–7)
- (0:10) OSU – Ben Gulbranson 8-yard run, Everett Hayes kick (Drive 11 plays, 59 yards, 5:35; Oregon State 28–7)

Fourth quarter

- (9:38) OSU – Everett Hayes 26-yard field goal (Drive 4 plays, 3 yards, 0:51; Oregon State 31–7)

Statistics	OSU	ASU
First downs	28	13
Total yards	443	276
Rushes/yards	42–222	25–154
Passing yards	221	122
Passing: Comp–Att–Int	18–24–0	20–32–0
Time of possession	34:17	25:43

Team	Category	Player	Statistics
Oregon State	Passing	Ben Gulbranson	15/21, 188 yards, TD
Oregon State	Rushing	Damien Martinez	22 carries, 138 yards, 2 TD
Oregon State	Receiving	Jack Velling	3 receptions, 74 yards, TD
Arizona State	Passing	Trenton Bourguet	20/32, 122 yards
Arizona State	Rushing	Xazavian Valladay	13 carries, 109 yards, TD
Arizona State	Receiving	Jalin Conyers	6 receptions, 49 yards

=== at Arizona ===
Arizona State Sun Devils (3–8) at Arizona Wildcats (4–7) – Game summary

Quarter	1	2	3	4	Total
Sun Devils	0	14	14	7	35
Wildcats	7	3	21	7	38

at Arizona Stadium • Tucson, AZ

- Date: November 25, 2022
- Game time: 1:00 p.m.
- Game weather: Sunny, 64 °F (18 °C)
- Game attendance: 49,865
- Referee: Steve Strimling
- TV announcers (FS1): Adam Alexander (play-by-play), Devin Gardner (analyst)

Game information

First quarter

- (8:51) ARIZ – Michael Wiley 51-yard run, Tyler Loop kick (Drive: 4 plays, 80 yards, 2:31; Arizona 7–0)

Second quarter

- (14:17) ARIZ – Tyler Loop 29-yard field goal (Drive: 10 plays, 28 yards, 3:28; Arizona 10–0)
- (10:35) ASU – Xazavian Valladay 4-yard run, Carter Brown kick (Drive: 10 plays, 75 yards, 3:42; Arizona 10–7)
- (0:58) ASU – Elijhah Badger 4-yard pass from Trenton Bourguet, Carter Brown kick (Drive: 16 plays, 80 yards, 5:24; Arizona State 14–10)

Third quarter

- (12:43) ARIZ – Jonah Coleman 9-yard run, Tyler Loop kick (Drive: 7 plays, 75 yards, 2:17; Arizona 17–14)
- (7:08) ASU – Giovanni Sanders 9-yard pass from Trenton Bourguet, Carter Brown kick (Drive: 11 plays, 72 yards, 5:29; Arizona State 21–17)
- (6:07) ASU – Michael Wiley 12-yard run, Tyler Loop kick (Drive: 3 plays, 75 yards, 1:01; Arizona 24–21)
- (4:00) ARIZ – Michael Wiley 72-yard run, Tyler Loop kick (Drive: 2 plays, 64 yards, 0:38; Arizona 31–21)
- (0:01) ASU – Xazavian Valladay 1-yard run, Carter Brown kick (Drive: 8 plays, 74 yards, 3:52; Arizona 31–28)

Fourth quarter

- (11:04) ASU – Jalin Conyers 4-yard pass from Trenton Bourguet, Carter Brown kick (Drive: 8 plays, 65 yards, 3:03; Arizona State 35–31)
- (8:53) ARIZ – D. J. Williams 1-yard run, Tyler Loop kick (Drive: 4 plays, 75 yards, 2:11; Arizona 38–35)

Statistics	ASU	ARIZ
First downs	39	18
Total yards	537	480
Rushes/yards	38–161	28–280
Passing yards	376	200
Passing: Comp–Att–Int	37–49–1	12–23–1
Time of possession	37:39	22:21

Team	Category	Player	Statistics
Arizona State	Passing	Trenton Bourguet	37/49, 376 yards, 3 TD, 2 INT
Arizona State	Rushing	Xazavian Valladay	24 carries, 97 yards, 2 TD
Arizona State	Receiving	Giovanni Sanders	8 receptions, 120 yards, TD
Arizona	Passing	Jayden de Laura	12/23, 200 yards, INT
Arizona	Rushing	Michael Wiley	12 carries, 214 yards, 3 TD
Arizona	Receiving	Dorian Singer	3 receptions, 91 yards
