= Michael Wiley (running back, born 2000) =

American football player (born 2000)

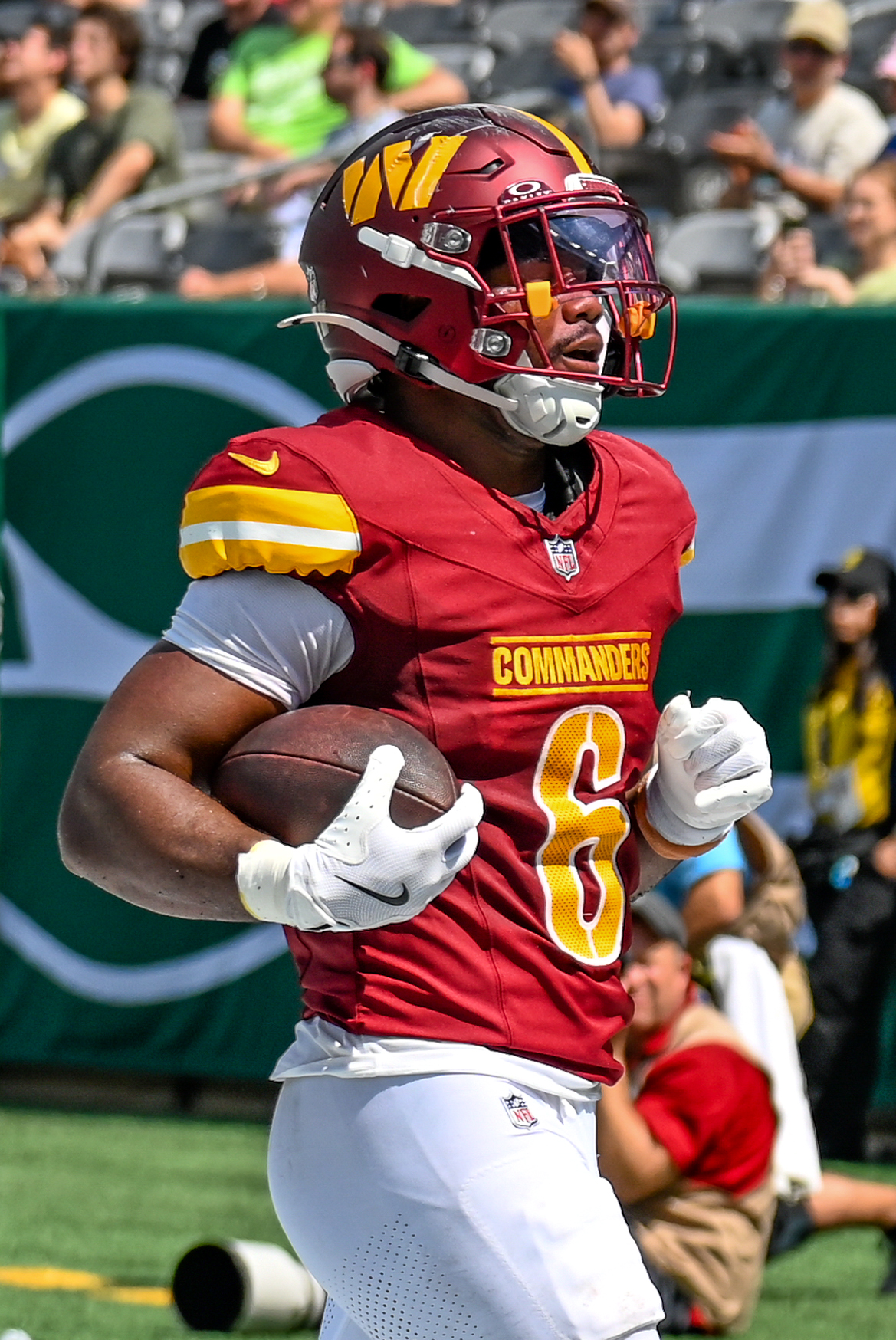
- Wiley with the Washington Commanders in 2024

Profile
- Position: Running back

Personal information
- Born: November 10, 2000 (age 25); Houston, Texas, U.S.
- Listed height: 5 ft 10 in (1.78 m)
- Listed weight: 209 lb (95 kg)

Career information
- High school: Strake Jesuit (Houston)
- College: Arizona (2019–2023)
- NFL draft: 2024: undrafted

Career history
- Washington Commanders (2024)*; Kansas City Chiefs (2025)*; Tampa Bay Buccaneers (2025)*
- * Offseason or practice squad member only
- Stats at Pro Football Reference

Michael Wiley (born November 10, 2000) is an American professional football running back. He played college football for the Arizona Wildcats and signed with the Washington Commanders as an undrafted free agent in 2024.

== Early life ==
Wiley was born on November 10, 2000, in Houston, Texas. He attended Strake Jesuit College Preparatory where he lettered in football, basketball, and track. Coming out of high school, Wiley was rated as a three-star recruit where he garnered interest from schools such as Arizona, Iowa State, Utah, and Toledo. Wiley decided to commit to play college football for the Arizona Wildcats.

== College career ==
In week three of the 2020 season, Wiley had a breakout game rushing seven times for 123 yards. In Wiley's first three seasons in 2019, 2020, and 2021 he rushed 153 times for 630 yards and five touchdowns, while also notching 59 receptions for 495 yards and four touchdowns. In the 2022 regular-season finale, Wiley rushed for 214 yards and three touchdowns, as he helped Arizona beat rival Arizona State. For his performance against Arizona State, Wiley was named the game's MVP. During the 2022 season, Wiley rushed for 771 yards and eight touchdowns, while also bringing in 36 receptions for 349 yards and three touchdowns. For his performance on the 2022 season, Wiley was named an all Pac-12 honorable mention. Wiley entered the 2023 season as a team Captain for the Wildcats. During the 2023 season, Wiley rushed for 311 yards and three touchdowns, while also hauling in 28 receptions for 306 yards and five touchdowns. Wiley finished his career at Arizona rushing for 1,712 yards and 16 touchdowns with 1,150 receiving yards and 12 touchdowns.

== Professional career ==
Pre-draft measurables
Height	Weight	Arm length	Hand span	Wingspan	40-yard dash	10-yard split	20-yard split	20-yard shuttle	Three-cone drill	Vertical jump	Broad jump
5 ft 10 1/2 in (1.79 m)	210 lb (95 kg)	30 in (0.76 m)	9 1/4 in (0.23 m)	6 ft 2 1/8 in (1.88 m)	4.51 s	1.54 s	2.61 s	4.43 s	7.14 s	35.5 in (0.90 m)	10 ft 0 in (3.05 m)
All values from NFL Combine/Pro Day

=== Washington Commanders ===
Wiley signed with the Washington Commanders as an undrafted free agent on April 29, 2024. He was also selected by the DC Defenders in the sixth round of the 2024 UFL draft on July 17. Wiley was waived by the team on August 27, and joined their practice squad the following day. He signed a futures contract with Washington on February 6, 2025. Wiley was released on July 22.

=== Kansas City Chiefs ===
On August 12, 2025, Wiley signed with the Kansas City Chiefs. He was waived on August 26 as part of final roster cuts.

=== Tampa Bay Buccaneers ===
On October 14, 2025, Wiley signed with the Tampa Bay Buccaneers' practice squad. He was released by Tampa Bay on December 30. On January 8, 2026, Wiley signed a reserve/futures contract with the Buccaneers. He was waived by the team on May 9.
