= Ephesians Prysock =

American football player (born 2003)

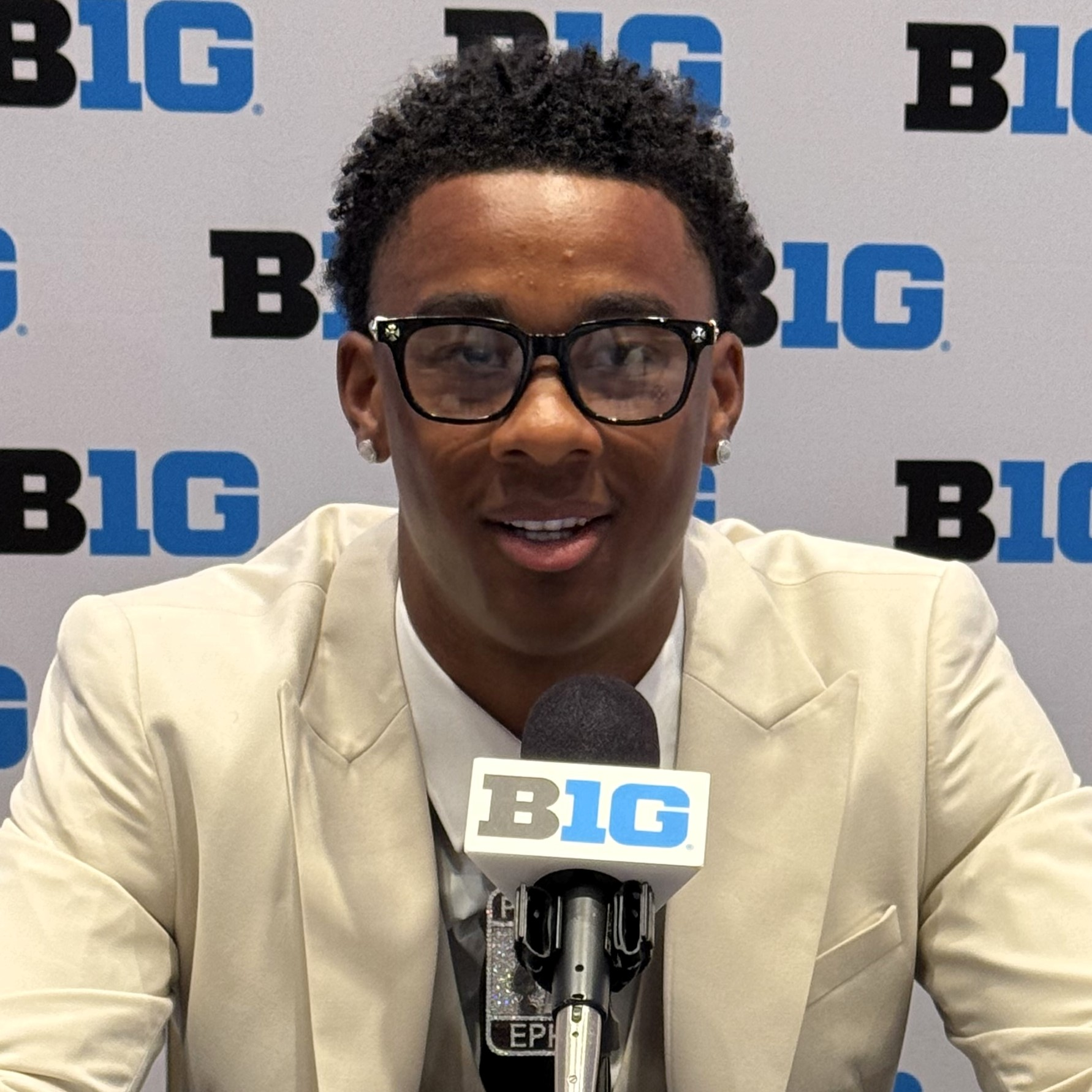
- Prysock in 2025

No. 28 – San Francisco 49ers
- Position: Cornerback
- Roster status: Active

Personal information
- Born: February 28, 2003 (age 23); Canyon Country, California
- Listed height: 6 ft 3 in (1.91 m)
- Listed weight: 196 lb (89 kg)

Career information
- High school: Bishop Alemany (Mission Hills, California)
- College: Arizona (2022–2023); Washington (2024–2025)
- NFL draft: 2026: 4th round, 139th overall pick

Career history
- San Francisco 49ers (2026–present)
- Stats at Pro Football Reference

Ephesians Prysock (born February 28, 2003) is an American professional football cornerback for the San Francisco 49ers of the National Football League (NFL). He played college football for the Arizona Wildcats and Washington Huskies and was selected by the 49ers in the fourth round of the 2026 NFL draft.

== Early life ==
Coming out of high school, Prysock was rated as a four-star recruit and the 26th best cornerback in the class of 2022. He received offers from schools such as Arizona, Arizona State, Colorado, LSU, Notre Dame, Oklahoma, Ohio State, Oregon, Tennessee, UCLA, and USC, ultimately committing to play college football for the Arizona Wildcats.

== College career ==
=== Arizona ===
As a freshman in 2022, Prysock played in ten games where he made 16 tackles. In 2023, he started all 13 games for Arizona, where he notched 61 tackles with one going for a loss, seven pass deflections, and an interception, earning honorable mention all-Pac-12 Conference honors. After the season, Prysock entered his name into the NCAA transfer portal.

Prysock finished his career at Arizona totaling 80 tackles, seven pass deflections, and an interception.

=== Washington ===
Prysock transferred to play for the Washington Huskies. In two seasons for the Huskies, Prysock compiled 93 total tackles, 14 passes defensed and an interception. He was named Honorable Mention All-Big Ten.

== Professional career ==
Pre-draft measurables
Height	Weight	Arm length	Hand span	Wingspan	40-yard dash	10-yard split	20-yard split	20-yard shuttle	Three-cone drill	Vertical jump	Broad jump
6 ft 3 3/8 in (1.91 m)	196 lb (89 kg)	33 1/8 in (0.84 m)	9 3/4 in (0.25 m)	6 ft 8 1/2 in (2.04 m)	4.45 s	1.57 s	2.62 s	4.15 s	6.82 s	39.0 in (0.99 m)	10 ft 4 in (3.15 m)
All values from NFL Combine/Pro Day

Prysock was selected in the fourth round of the 2026 NFL draft with the 139th pick by the San Francisco 49ers. On May 8, he signed his rookie deal with the 49ers.
