= 2021 Arizona Wildcats football team =

American college football season

2021 Arizona Wildcats football
- Conference: Pac-12 Conference
- South Division
- Record: 1–11 (1–8 Pac-12)
- Head coach: Jedd Fisch (1st season)
- Offensive coordinator: Brennan Carroll (1st season)
- Offensive scheme: Pro-style
- Defensive coordinator: Don Brown (1st season)
- Base defense: 4–3
- Home stadium: Arizona Stadium

2021 Pac-12 Conference football standings
	Conf.			Overall
Team	W		L	W		L
North Division
No. 22 Oregon xy	7	–	2	10	–	4
Washington State	6	–	3	7	–	6
Oregon State	5	–	4	7	–	6
California	4	–	5	5	–	7
Washington	3	–	6	4	–	8
Stanford	2	–	7	3	–	9
South Division
No. 12 Utah xy$	8	–	1	10	–	4
UCLA	6	–	3	8	–	4
Arizona State†	0	–	3	0	–	5
USC	3	–	6	4	–	8
Colorado	3	–	6	4	–	8
Arizona	1	–	8	1	–	11
Championship: Utah 38, Oregon 10
$ – Conference champion; x – Division champion/co-champions; y – Championship game participant; Rankings from AP Poll

The 2021 Arizona Wildcats football team represented the University of Arizona during the 2021 NCAA Division I FBS football season. They were led by first-year head coach Jedd Fisch, and they played their home games at Arizona Stadium in Tucson, Arizona. It was the Wildcats' 122nd season overall and 43rd as a member of the Pac-12 Conference and 11th in the Pac-12 South Division.

== Offseason ==
=== Position key ===
Back	B	Center	C	Cornerback	CB	Defensive back	DB
Defensive end	DE	Defensive lineman	DL	Defensive tackle	DT	End	E
Fullback	FB	Guard	G	Halfback	HB	Kicker	K
Kickoff returner	KR	Offensive tackle	OT	Offensive lineman	OL	Linebacker	LB
Long snapper	LS	Punter	P	Punt returner	PR	Quarterback	QB
Running back	RB	Safety	S	Tight end	TE	Wide receiver	WR

=== Players ===
Name	Number	Pos.	Height	Weight	Year	Hometown	Notes
Gary Brightwell	#23	RB	6'1	210	Senior	Chester, PA	Graduated/Declared for NFL draft
Lorenzo Burns	#2	DB	5'11	175	RS senior	Murrieta, CA	Graduated/Declared for NFL draft
Roy Lopez	51	DL	6'2	310	Graduate Student	Tempe, AZ	Graduated/Declared for NFL draft
Steven Bailey	63	C	6'3	313	RS senior	Litchfield Park, AZ	Graduated
Dante Diaz-Infante	40	DE	6'1	262	Senior	Phoenix, AZ	Graduated

==== Outgoing transfers ====
The Wildcats lost fifteen players via transfer portal for the 2021 season.

Name	No.	Pos.	Height	Weight	Year	Hometown	New school
Grant Gunnell	#17	QB	6 ft 6 in (1.98 m)	225 pounds (102 kg)	Sophomore	The Woodlands, TX	Memphis
Robert Congel	#66	OL	6 ft 10 in (2.08 m)	310 pounds (140 kg)	Junior	Greenwood Village, CO	Oklahoma
Jamari Williams	#55	OL	6 ft 3 in (1.91 m)	298 pounds (135 kg)	(redshirt) Freshman	Fort Lauderdale, FL	Middle Tennessee
Rhett Rodriguez	#4	QB	6 ft 0 in (1.83 m)	192 pounds (87 kg)	(redshirt) Junior	Catalina Foothills, AZ	Louisiana-Monroe
Kylan Wilborn	#14	LB	6 ft 2 in (1.88 m)	243 pounds (110 kg)	Junior	Northridge, CA	UNLV
Khary Crump	#20	DB	5 ft 11 in (1.80 m)	164 pounds (74 kg)	Freshman	Culver City, CA	Michigan State
Drew Dixon	#1	WR	6 ft 3 in (1.91 m)	205 pounds (93 kg)	(redshirt) Junior	Tucson, AZ	TBD
Edric Whitley	#11	DB	5 ft 11 in (1.80 m)	144 pounds (65 kg)	Freshman	Pflugerville, TX	Kilgore College
Frank Brown	#8	RB	6 ft 0 in (1.83 m)	200 pounds (91 kg)	Freshman	Houston, TX	TBD
Mykee Irving	#60	DL	6 ft 3 in (1.91 m)	337 pounds (153 kg)	(redshirt) Junior	Calabasas, CA	San Diego
Jarrius Wallace	#3	S	6 ft 1 in (1.85 m)	185 pounds (84 kg)	(redshirt) Senior	Villa, LA	McNeese State
Kevin Doyle	#12	QB	6 ft 3 in (1.91 m)	205 pounds (93 kg)	(redshirt) Junior	Washington, D.C.	William & Mary
Nathan Tilford	#33	RB	6 ft 2 in (1.88 m)	207 pounds (94 kg)	(redshirt) Junior	Fontana, CA	UT Permian Basin
Cameron Fietz	#16	QB	6 ft 1 in (1.85 m)	196 pounds (89 kg)	(redshirt) Junior	Calgary, Alberta	TBD
Darrell Branch	#71	OG	6 ft 2 in (1.88 m)	319 pounds (145 kg)	Freshman	Gilbert, AZ	Tennessee State
Derrick Mourning	#18	LB	6 ft 3 in (1.91 m)	229 pounds (104 kg)	(redshirt) Freshman	Gilbert, AZ	Kilgore College

Incoming transfers

The Wildcats add fourteen players via transfer portal from the 2020 season.

Name	No.	Pos.	Height	Weight	Year	Hometown	Prev. school
Mohamed Diallo	#--	DL	6 ft 4 in (1.93 m)	306 pounds (139 kg)	Senior	Toronto, Canada	Central Michigan
Isaiah Rutherford	#2	CB	6 ft 0 in (1.83 m)	193 pounds (88 kg)	Sophomore	Sacramento, CA	Notre Dame
Jordan McCloud	#4	QB	6 ft 0 in (1.83 m)	193 pounds (88 kg)	Sophomore	Tampa, FL	South Florida
Jason Harris	#6	LB	6 ft 7 in (2.01 m)	240 pounds (110 kg)	Freshman	Gilbert, AZ	Colorado
Drake Anderson	#8	RB	6 ft 0 in (1.83 m)	180 pounds (82 kg)	Sophomore	Chandler, AZ	Northwestern
Gunner Cruz	#9	QB	6 ft 5 in (1.96 m)	217 pounds (98 kg)	Freshman	Gilbert, AZ	Washington State
Gunner Maldonado	#9	DB	6 ft 0 in (1.83 m)	180 pounds (82 kg)	Freshman	Chandler, AZ	Northwestern
Kenny Hebert	#21	LB	6 ft 4 in (1.93 m)	232 pounds (105 kg)	(redshirt) Senior	New Orleans, LA	Vanderbilt
Treshaun Hayward	#23	LB	6 ft 1 in (1.85 m)	235 pounds (107 kg)	Senior	Ypsilanti, MI	Western Michigan
Jerry Roberts	#33	LB	6 ft 4 in (1.93 m)	235 pounds (107 kg)	(redshirt) Junior	Erie, PA	Bowling Green
Alex Lines	#34	TE	6 ft 5 in (1.96 m)	245 pounds (111 kg)	Freshman	Gilbert, AZ	UNLV
Clay Markoff	#44	RB	5 ft 10 in (1.78 m)	239 pounds (108 kg)	Senior	Olympia, WA	Washington State
Malik Reed	#53	LB	6 ft 2 in (1.88 m)	220 pounds (100 kg)	Freshman	Chandler, AZ	Wisconsin
Davis DiVall	#79	OL	6 ft 4 in (1.93 m)	293 pounds (133 kg)	Freshman	Phoenix, AZ	Baylor
Leevel Tatum	#97	DE	6 ft 1 in (1.85 m)	259 pounds (117 kg)	Senior	Fresno, CA	Fresno State

=== Recruiting class ===
The Wildcats signed a total of 18 scholarship recruits and 7 walk-ons during national signing period.

==== Overall class rankings ====
Website	Overall rank	Conference rank	5 star recruits	4 star recruits	3 star recruits
ESPN	—	—	0	0	0
Rivals	68	11	0	1	22
247 Sports	77	11	0	1	22

==== Recruits ====
College recruiting
Name	Hometown	School	Height	Weight	Commit date
Javione Carr; CB	Arlington, TX	Sam Houston High School	5 ft 10 in (1.78 m)	165 lb (75 kg)	Sep 10, 2020
Javione Carr; CB	Recruit ratings: Rivals: 247Sports: ESPN: (76)				
Kevon Garcia; LB	Houston, TX	Andy Dekaney High School	6 ft 2 in (1.88 m)	215 lb (98 kg)	Jun 15, 2020
Kevon Garcia; LB	Recruit ratings: Rivals: 247Sports: ESPN: (76)				
James Bohls; RB	San Clemente, CA	San Clemente High School	6 ft 0 in (1.83 m)	195 lb (88 kg)	Aug 23, 2020
James Bohls; RB	Recruit ratings: Rivals: 247Sports: ESPN: (75)				
D.J. Fryar; LB	Steilacoom, WA	Steilacoom High School	6 ft 3 in (1.91 m)	210 lb (95 kg)	Jul 4, 2020
D.J. Fryar; LB	Recruit ratings: Rivals: 247Sports: ESPN: (74)				
Alex Navarro-Silva; DE	Chino, CA	Riverside Community College (JC)	6 ft 5 in (1.96 m)	220 lb (100 kg)	Jun 28, 2020
Alex Navarro-Silva; DE	Recruit ratings: Rivals: 247Sports: ESPN: (74)				
Jackson Bailey; LB	Red Oak, TX	Red Oak High School	6 ft 1 in (1.85 m)	220 lb (100 kg)	May 8, 2020
Jackson Bailey; LB	Recruit ratings: Rivals: 247Sports: ESPN: (74)				
Dalton Johnson; S	Katy, TX	Katy High School	5 ft 10 in (1.78 m)	180 lb (82 kg)	Jun 15, 2020
Dalton Johnson; S	Recruit ratings: Rivals: 247Sports: ESPN: (74)				
Kolbe Cage; LB	New Orleans, LA	Holy Cross High School	6 ft 0 in (1.83 m)	200 lb (91 kg)	May 6, 2020
Kolbe Cage; LB	Recruit ratings: Rivals: 247Sports: ESPN: (74)				
Isaiah Taylor; CB	Fort Lauderdale, FL	St. Thomas Aquinas High School	5 ft 11 in (1.80 m)	185 lb (84 kg)	Jan 8, 2021
Isaiah Taylor; CB	Recruit ratings: Rivals: 247Sports: ESPN: (73)				
Logan Kraut; ATH (WR/DB)	Santa Rosa, CA	Maria Carrillo High School	6 ft 2 in (1.88 m)	190 lb (86 kg)	Jul 12, 2020
Logan Kraut; ATH (WR/DB)	Recruit ratings: Rivals: 247Sports: ESPN: (73)				
Matthew Weerts; LB	Batavia, IL	Batavia High School	6 ft 2 in (1.88 m)	225 lb (102 kg)	Jun 22, 2020
Matthew Weerts; LB	Recruit ratings: Rivals: 247Sports: ESPN: (73)				
J.T. Hand; OL	Mission Viejo, CA	Mission Viejo High School	6 ft 3 in (1.91 m)	285 lb (129 kg)	May 31, 2020
J.T. Hand; OL	Recruit ratings: Rivals: 247Sports: ESPN: (73)				
Colby Powers; TE	Klein, TX	Klein Collins High School	6 ft 4 in (1.93 m)	235 lb (107 kg)	Jun 26, 2020
Colby Powers; TE	Recruit ratings: Rivals: 247Sports: ESPN: (71)				
Luke Eckardt; OT	Richmond, IL	Richmond-Burton High School	6 ft 7 in (2.01 m)	265 lb (120 kg)	Jul 17, 2020
Luke Eckardt; OT	Recruit ratings: Rivals: 247Sports: ESPN: (71)				
Anthony Simpson; ATH (RB/S)	Bloomfield, CT	Bloomfield High School	5 ft 11 in (1.80 m)	180 lb (82 kg)	Jan 8, 2021
Anthony Simpson; ATH (RB/S)	Recruit ratings: Rivals: 247Sports: ESPN: (71)				
Evan Branch-Haynes; DT	San Francisco, CA	Sacred Heart Cathedral Prep	6 ft 2 in (1.88 m)	270 lb (120 kg)	Jun 7, 2020
Evan Branch-Haynes; DT	Recruit ratings: Rivals: 247Sports: ESPN: (70)				
Jakelyn Morgan; CB	Tyler, TX	Tyler Legacy High School	6 ft 1 in (1.85 m)	175 lb (79 kg)	Aug 27, 2020
Jakelyn Morgan; CB	Recruit ratings: Rivals: 247Sports: ESPN: (70)				
Overall recruit ranking: Rivals: 64 247Sports: 65 ESPN: 40
‡ Refers to 40-yard dash; Note: In many cases, Scout, Rivals, 247Sports, On3, and ESPN may conflict in their listings of height, weight and 40 time.; In these cases, the average was taken. ESPN grades are on a 100-point scale.; Sources: "Arizona Football Commitment List". Rivals.; "2021 Player Commitments – Arizona". ESPN.; "2021 Team Ranking". Rivals.com.; "2021 Arizona Wildcats football team". 247Sports.

=== 2021 NFL draft ===
The following Wildcats were selected in the 2021 NFL draft.

Round	Pick	Player	Position	NFL team
6	195	Roy Lopez	DT	Houston Texans
6	196	Gary Brightwell	RB	New York Giants

=== Returning starters ===
Offense

Player	Class	Position
Will Plummer	Sophomore	Quarterback
Michael Wiley	Sophomore	Running back
Jarmarye Joiner	RS junior	Wide receiver
Stanley Berryhill	RS senior	Wide receiver
Bryce Wolma	Grad Student	Tight end
Josh McCauley	Grad Student	Offensive line

Defense

Player	Class	Position
J.B. Brown	Grad Student	Defensive end
Anthony Pandy	Grad Student	Linebacker
Christian Young	Senior	Defensive back

Special teams

Player	Class	Position
Lucas Havrisik	Grad Student	Placekicker
Kyle Ostendorp	Junior	Punter
Seth MacKellar	Junior	Long snapper
Tayvian Cunningham	Grad Student	Kickoff Returner
Jarmarye Joiner	RS junior	Punt Returner

† Indicates player was a starter in 2020 but missed all of 2021 due to injury.

== Preseason ==
=== Award watch lists ===
Listed in the order that they were released

Award	Player	Position	Year
Doak Walker Award	Michael Wiley	RB	So.
Rimington Trophy	Josh McCauley	C	GS.
Wuerffel Trophy	Bryce Wolma	TE	GS
Earl Campbell Tyler Rose Award	Michael Wiley	RB	So.
Polynesian College Football Player Of The Year Award	Donovan Laie	OL	Sr.

=== Pac-12 Media Day ===
The Pac-12 Media Day was held on July 27, 2021, in Hollywood, California. Arizona head coach Jedd Fisch, wide receiver Stanley Berryhill, and linebacker Anthony Pandy were in attendance to field questions from the media.

In the preseason media poll, Arizona was predicted to finish sixth in the Pac-12 South Division.

=== Preseason All-Pac-12 teams ===
Second team

Position	Player	Class	Team
Second Team Special teams
PK	Lucas Havrisik	Sr.	Arizona

== Personnel ==
=== Coaching staff ===
Name	Position	Alma mater	Year at Arizona
Jedd Fisch	Head coach	University of Florida (1998)	1st
Brennan Carroll	Offensive Coordinator, Offensive line coach	University of Pittsburgh (2001)	1st
Jimmie Dougherty	Assistant coach, Quarterbacks, Passing game coordinator	University of Missouri (2002)	1st
Scottie Graham	Assistant coach, Running Backs	Ohio State University (1996)	1st
Kevin Cummings	Assistant coach, Wide receivers	Oregon State University (2014)	1st
Jordan Paopao	Assistant coach, Tight Ends & Co-Special Teams Coordinator	University of San Diego (2008)	1st
Don Brown	Defensive Coordinator	Norwich University (1977)	1st
Ricky Hunley	Assistant coach, Defensive Line	University of Arizona (1983)	1st
Chuck Cecil	Assistant coach, Safeties	University of Arizona (1987)	1st
DeWayne Walker	Assistant coach, Cornerbacks	University of Minnesota (1981)	1st
Keith Dudzinski	Assistant coach, Linebackers & Co-Special Teams Coordinator	University of New Haven (1991)	1st
Tedy Bruschi	Senior Advisor to Head Coach	University of Arizona (1995)	1st
Tyler Owens	Director of Strength and Conditioning	University of Alabama (2015)	1st

Graduate assistants

Name	Position	Alma mater	Year at Arizona
Luke McNitt	Offensive graduate assistant	University of Nebraska–Lincoln (2018)	2nd
Darren Andrews	Graduate Assistant, wide receivers coach	UCLA (2018)	1st
Ty Nichols	Graduate Assistant	Texas Tech University (2020)	1st
Garrison Smith	Graduate Assistant	University of Georgia (2013)	3rd

Analysts

Name	Position	Alma mater	Year at Arizona
Derron Montgomery	Assistant running backs coach, Senior Offensive Analyst	Abilene Christian University (2011)	1st
Beyah Rasool	Assistant Defensive backs coach, Senior Defensive Analyst	Eastern Arizona College (2007)	1st
Scott Spurrier	Special Teams Analyst	University of South Carolina (2008)	1st
Darell Garretson	Offensive Analyst	Oregon State University (2016)	1st
Aaron Van Horn	Defensive Analyst	University of Michigan (2019)	1st
Kyle Rosenbaum	Recruiting Analyst	Indiana University (2020)	1st

=== Roster ===
2021 Arizona Wildcats roster
Quarterback: 4 – Jordan McCloud – (redshirt) junior (6'0, 200); 9 – Gunner Cruz – (redshirt) sophomore (6'5, 227); 12 – Brayden Zermeno – freshman (6'4, 219); 13 – Luke Ashworth – (redshirt) junior (6'2, 208); 15 – Will Plummer – sophomore (6'1, 204); 17 – Jaden White – freshman (6'0, 197); Running back: 6 – Michael Wiley – junior (5'11, 207); 8 – Drake Anderson – (redshirt) sophomore (5'11, 194); 20 – Darrius Smith – (redshirt) junior (5'9, 187); 21 – Jalen John – sophomore (5'11, 221); 23 – Stevie Rocker – freshman (6'0, 202); 28 – Nazar Bombata – (redshirt) junior (6'0, 202); 29 – Jashon Butler – (redshirt) sophomore (5'10, 201); 33 – James Bohls – freshman (6'0, 211); 44 – Clay Markoff – (redshirt) Graduate (5'10, 239); Wide receiver: 1 – Stanley Berryhill – (redshirt) senior (5'11, 190); 2 – Boobie Curry – junior (6'2, 211); 3 – Jalen Johnson – (redshirt) Sophomore (6'2, 209); 5 – Brian Casteel – (redshirt) senior (6'0, 197); 7 – Jaden Mitchell – (redshirt) freshman (5'9, 182); 10 – Jamarye Joiner – (redshirt) junior (6'1, 208); 11 – Tayvian Cunningham – (redshirt) Graduate (5'7, 183); 16 – Thomas Reid III – (redshirt) Graduate (6'3, 221); 18 – Ma'Jon Wright – freshman (6'2, 197); 24 – Dorian Singer – freshman (6'1, 185); 25 – Anthony Simpson – freshman (5'11, 184); 26 – Jaden Clark – freshman (5'10, 172); 84 – Tristen D'Angelo – (redshirt) junior (6'3, 200); Tight ends: 80 – Connor Hutchings – (redshirt) Graduate (6'5, 230); 81 – Bryce Wolma – (redshirt) Graduate (6'4, 237); 82 – Zach Williams – (redshirt) junior (6'3, 239); 83 – Colby Powers – freshman (6'4, 230); 85 – Roberto Miranda – sophomore (6'2, 217); 87 – Stacey Marshall – senior (6'5, 262); 88 – Alex Lines – (redshirt) freshman (6'5, 245); Placekicker: 32 – Jacob Meeker-Hackett (redshirt) Graduate (6'0, 215); 33 – Tyler Loop – sophomore (6'0, 180); 43 – Lucas Havrisik – (redshirt) Graduate (6'2, 188)	Offensive Lineman: 50 – Josh McCauley – OL – (redshirt) Graduate (6'4, 310); 51 – Lucas Eckardt – OT – freshman (6'6, 290); 54 – Matthew Stefanski – OG – (redshirt) junior (6'4, 324); 55 – JT Hand – OL – freshman (6'4, 310); 56 – Josh Donovan – OT – (redshirt) senior (6'5, 320); 58 – Sam Langi – OG – (redshirt) junior (6'5, 311); 65 – Leif Magnuson – OT – (redshirt) freshman (6'4, 296); 67 – David Watson – OT – (redshirt) junior (6'5, 290); 71 – Jaxon McBride – OT – freshman (6'5, 295); 73 – Woody Jean – OL – sophomore (6'4, 302); 74 – Paiton Fears – OT – (redshirt) senior (6'6, 307); 75 – Josh Baker – OL – sophomore (6'3, 305); 76 – Anthony Patt – OT – sophomore (6'5, 275); 77 – Jordan Morgan – OT – junior (6'6, 312); 78 – Donovan Laie – OT – senior (6'5, 323); 79 – Davis DiVall – OG – (redshirt) freshman (6'4, 295); Defensive Lineman: 1 – Jalen Harris – DT – (redshirt) senior (6'5, 254); 12 – JB Brown – DT – (redshirt) Graduate (6'3, 281); 17 – Regen Terry – DE – freshman (6'4, 284); 26 – Mohamed Diallo – Graduate Student (6'4, 306); 41 – Eddie Siaumau-Sanitoa – DE – (redshirt) freshman (6'3, 245); 44 – Shontrail Key – DT – freshman (6'4, 261); 52 – Aaron Blackwell – DT – (redshirt) Graduate (6'3, 284); 55 – Evan Branch-Haynes – DE – freshman (6'2, 309); 58 – Nahe Sulunga – DT – (redshirt) junior (6'3, 253); 90 – Trevon Mason – DT – (redshirt) Graduate (6'5, 305); 91 – Alex Navarro-Silva – Sophomore (6'5, 280); 92 – Kyon Barrs – DT – junior (6'3, 295); 93 – Ugochukwu Nosike – DT – freshman (6'3, 280); 94 – Dion Wilson Jr. – DE – freshman (6'4, 285); 95 – Paris Shand – DE – sophomore (6'5, 281); 96 – Reid Codwell – DT – freshman (6'2, 262); 97 – Leevel Tatum III – DT – (redshirt) Graduate (6'1, 285); 99 – Myles Tapusoa – DT – (redshirt) Graduate (6'1, 345); Punter: 19 – Kyle Ostendorp – junior (6'1, 215)	Linebacker: 6 – Jason Harris – (redshirt) freshman (6'7, 255); 8 – Anthony Pandy – (redshirt) Graduate (6'1, 228); 10 – Jabar Triplett – (redshirt) freshman (6'1, 238); 11 – Kolbe Cage – freshman (6'0, 205); 18 – Kenny Hebert – (redshirt) Graduate (6'4, 231); 23 – Treshaun Hayward – (redshirt) Graduate (6'1, 229); 29 – Jackson Bailey – freshman (6'3, 237); 32 – Matt Weerts – freshman (6'1, 223); 34 – John Burton – (redshirt) sophomore (5'11, 205); 35 – Rashie Hodge Jr. – (redshirt) Graduate (5'11, 214); 36 – RJ Edwards – freshman (6'2, 217); 37 – Kevon Garcia – freshman (6'2, 240); 38 – Dante Smith – (redshirt) junior (5'10, 222); 40 – Ammon Allen – freshman (6'3, 194); 42 – DJ Fryar Jr. – freshman (6'2, 227); 45 – Issaiah Johnson – (redshirt) sophomore (6'1, 245); 46 – Victor Zayas – freshman (6'2, 220); 47 – Rourke Freeburg – (redshirt) senior (6'2, 220); 48 – Jerry Roberts – (redshirt) Graduate (6'2, 226); 51 – Chandler Kelly – sophomore (6'2, 222); 53 – Malik Reed – freshman (6'1, 225); Defensive backs: 2 – Isaiah Rutherford – CB – sophomore (6'1, 195); 3 – Jaydin Young – S – freshman (6'0, 192); 4 – Christian Roland-Wallace – CB – sophomore (6'0, 194); 5 – Christian Young – S – senior (6'3, 217); 7 – Rhedi Short – S – (redshirt) senior (6'1, 196); 9 – Gunner Maldonado – S – (redshirt) freshman (6'0, 195); 13 – Isaiah Mays – CB – senior (6'1, 193); 14 – Logan Kraut – S – freshman (6'2, 197); 15 – McKenzie Barnes – CB – senior (6'2, 185); 16 – Dalton Johnson – S – freshman (5'11, 187); 19 – Adama Fall – CB – freshman (6'2, 200); 20 – Treydan Stukes – CB – sophomore (6'1, 184); 21 – Jaxen Turner – S – junior (6'0, 209); 23 – Malik Hausman – CB – (redshirt) senior (6'0, 187); 25 – Javione Carr – CB – freshman (5'11, 182); 27 – Jakelyn Morgan – CB – freshman (6'0, 170); 28 – Isaiah Taylor – S – freshman (5'11, 196); 30 – Anthony Gonzales – S – freshman (5'10, 183); 31 – Trey Cartledge – S – (redshirt) freshman (6'0, 170); 39 – Jeffrey Robinson – CB – freshman (5'9, 178); Long snappers: 39 – Kameron Hawkins – sophomore (5'11, 211); 64 – Seth Mackellar – junior (6'0, 220); Legend: (C) Team captain; (S) Suspended; (I) Ineligible; Injured; Redshirt
Source and player details:

=== Depth chart ===
Starters and backups.

Defense

FS
Jaydin Young
Gunner Maldonado
Trey Cartledge
⋅

WLB	MLB	SLB
Anthony Pandy	Treshaun Hayward; Jerry Roberts	Kenny Hebert
Malik Reed; Rashie Hodge Jr. RJ Edwards; Kolbe Cage	Dante Smith	Isaiah Johnson
⋅	⋅	⋅

SS
Jaxen Turner
Rhedi Short
Isaiah Taylor

CB
Christian Roland-Wallace
Malik Hausman
Isaiah Mays

DE	DT	DT	DE
JB Brown	Trevon Mason	Kyon Barrs	Jalen Harris
Mo Diallo	Dion Wilson Jr.	Leevel Tatum III	Nahe Sulunga; Eddie Siamau-Sanitoa
⋅	⋅	⋅	Jason Harris

CB
Isaiah Rutherford
Treydan Stukes
McKenzie Barnes

Offense

WR
Brian Casteel
Jalen Johnson
⋅

WR
Stanley Berryhill
Thomas Reid III
⋅

LT	LG	C	RG	RT
Jordan Morgan	Donovan Laie	Josh McCauley	Josh Donovan	Paiton Fears
Donovan Laie	Sam Langi	JT Hand	Josh Baker	⋅
⋅	⋅	⋅	⋅	⋅

TE
Bryce Wolma
Alex Lines
Stacey Marshall Jr.
Zach Williams
Clay Markoff

WR
Tayvian Cunningham
Boobie Curry
⋅

QB
Will Plummer
Gunner Cruz
Jordan McCloud
⋅

Key reserves
Season-ending injury
Suspension

RB
Michael Wiley
Drake Anderson
Stevie Rocker Jr.
Jalen John

Special teams
PK Lucas Havrisik
Tyler Loop
P Kyle Ostendorp
Jacob Meeker-Hackett
KR Tayvian Cunningham
Stanley Berryhill
PR Brian Casteel
Michael Wiley
LS Seth MacKellar
Kameron Hawkins
H Kyle Ostendorp
Jacob Meeker-Hackett

True Freshman
Double Position : *

Depth Chart Source: 2021 Arizona Wildcats Football Fact Book

== Schedule ==
=== Spring game ===
The 2021 Wildcats spring game is tentatively scheduled to take place in Tucson, Arizona on April 24, 2021. The Wildcats were scheduled to hold spring practices on March 23, 2021, will practice every Tuesday, Thursday and Saturday for five weeks.

Date	Time	Spring Game	Site	Result	Source
April 24, 2021	12:07 p.m.	Red vs Blue	Arizona Stadium • Tucson, AZ	Red 17–13	

=== Regular season ===
The Wildcats' 2021 schedule consists of 4 home and 5 away games and 1 neutral site game for the regular season. Arizona's out of conference opponents represent the Big Sky, NCAA Division I FBS independent and Mountain West conferences. The Wildcats currently own the nations longest FBS losing streak at 14 games.

The Wildcats are scheduled to play three non-conference games, against San Diego State from the (Mountain West) and Northern Arizona from the (Big Sky) at home and on the neutral against BYU (NCAA Division I FBS independent) at Allegiant Stadium in Las Vegas. The Wildcats are scheduled to host California, UCLA, Utah and Washington. They are scheduled to travel to Colorado, Oregon, Washington State, USC and arch-rival Arizona State for the 95th annual Territorial Cup. Arizona is not scheduled to play Pac-12 North opponents Oregon State, and Stanford for the 2021 Pac-12 regular season.

Date	Time	Opponent	Site	TV	Result	Attendance
September 4	7:30 p.m.	vs. BYU*	Allegiant Stadium; Paradise, NV (Vegas Kickoff Classic)	ESPN	L 16–24	54,541
September 11	7:00 p.m.	San Diego State*	Arizona Stadium; Tucson, AZ	P12N	L 14–38	39,097
September 18	7:00 p.m.	Northern Arizona*	Arizona Stadium; Tucson, AZ	P12N	L 19–21	33,481
September 25	7:30 p.m.	at No. 3 Oregon	Autzen Stadium; Eugene, OR	ESPN	L 19–41	50,024
October 9	7:30 p.m.	UCLA	Arizona Stadium; Tucson, AZ	ESPN	L 16–34	43,258
October 16	12:30 p.m.	at Colorado	Folsom Field; Boulder, CO	P12N	L 0–34	49,806
October 22	7:30 p.m.	Washington	Arizona Stadium; Tucson, AZ	ESPN2	L 16–21	30,880
October 30	4:00 p.m.	at USC	Los Angeles Memorial Coliseum; Los Angeles, CA	ESPNU	L 34–41	52,435
November 6	12:00 p.m.	California^{†}	Arizona Stadium; Tucson, AZ	P12N	W 10–3	30,677
November 13	12:00 p.m.	No. 24 Utah	Arizona Stadium; Tucson, AZ	P12N	L 29–38	32,008
November 19	7:00 p.m.	at Washington State	Martin Stadium; Pullman, WA	P12N	L 18–44	22,541
November 27	2:00 p.m.	at Arizona State	Sun Devil Stadium; Tempe, AZ (rivalry)	P12N	L 15–38	52,305
*Non-conference game; ^{†}Homecoming; Rankings from AP Poll and CFP Rankings after November 2 released prior to game; All times are in Mountain time

== Game summaries ==
=== vs BYU ===
BYU Cougars (0–0) vs Arizona Wildcats (0–0) – Game summary

Quarter	1	2	3	4	Total
Cougars	0	14	7	3	24
Wildcats	0	3	10	3	16

at Allegiant Stadium • Paradise, NV

- Date: September 4, 2021
- Game time: 7:30 P.M.
- Game weather: None (Indoor stadium)
- Game attendance: 54,541
- Referee: Kevin Mar
- TV announcers (ESPN): Dave Flemming (play-by-play), Rod Gilmore (analyst), Stormy Buonantony (sideline reporter)

Game information

First quarter

- No scoring plays

Second quarter

- (9:17) BYU – Tyler Allgeier 15-yard run, kick failed (Drive: 9 plays, 73 yards, 3:58; BYU 6–0)
- (2:06) BYU – Neil Pau'u 67-yard pass from Jaren Hall, Jaren Hall two-point pass to Lopini Katoa (Drive: 5 plays, 80 yards, 2:26; BYU 14–0)
- (0:13) ARIZ – Lucas Havrisik 28-yard field goal (Drive: 11 plays, 65 yards, 1:47; BYU 14–3)

Third quarter

- (7:28) BYU – Neil Pau'u 6-yard pass from Jaren Hall, Justen Smith kick (Drive: 9 plays, 80 yards, 4:48; BYU 21–3)
- (3:12) ARIZ – Team safety (BYU 21–5)
- (2:00) ARIZ – Brian Casteel 29-yard pass from Gunner Cruz, Gunner Cruz two-point pass to Brian Casteel (Drive: 3 plays, 46 yards, 1:05; BYU 21–13)

Fourth quarter

- (7:34) BYU – Justen Smith 40-yard field goal (Drive: 8 plays, 51 yards, 4:08; BYU 24–13)
- (0:49) ARIZ – Lucas Havrisik 37-yard field goal (Drive: 12 plays, 65 yards, 2:35; BYU 24–16)

Statistics	BYU	ARIZ
First downs	18	27
Total yards	369	426
Rushing yards	33–162	35–81
Passing yards	207	345
Passing: Comp–Att–Int	19–29–0	36–48–1
Time of possession	28:11	31:07

Team	Category	Player	Statistics
BYU	Passing	Jaren Hall	18/28, 198 yards, 2 TD
BYU	Rushing	Tyler Allgeier	17 carries, 94 yards, TD
BYU	Receiving	Neil Pau'u	8 receptions, 126 yards, 2 TD
Arizona	Passing	Gunner Cruz	34/45, 336 yards, TD, INT
Arizona	Rushing	Michael Wiley	15 carries, 64 yards
Arizona	Receiving	Stanley Berryhill III	12 receptions, 102 yards

=== vs San Diego State ===
San Diego State Aztecs (1–0) vs Arizona Wildcats (0–1) – Game summary

Quarter	1	2	3	4	Total
Aztecs	21	14	3	0	38
Wildcats	7	0	0	7	14

at Arizona Stadium • Tucson, AZ

- Date: September 11, 2021
- Game time: 7:00 P.M.
- Game weather: Sunny, 91 °F (33 °C)
- Game attendance: 39,097
- Referee: Kevin Mar
- TV announcers (Pac-12 Network): Roxy Bernstein (play-by-play), Yogi Roth (analyst)

Game information

First quarter

- (13:22) SDSU – Greg Bell 55-yard run, Matt Araiza kick (Drive: 4 plays, 75 yards, 1:38; San Diego State 7–0)
- (9:12) SDSU – Jordon Brookshire 3-yard run, Matt Araiza kick (Drive: 6 plays, 96 yards, 3:08; San Diego State 14–0)
- (7:07) SDSU – Tyrell Shavers 27-yard punt return, Matt Araiza kick (San Diego State 21–0)
- (5:50) ARIZ – Stanley Berryhill III 43-yard pass from Gunner Cruz, Tyler Loop kick (Drive: 4 plays, 75 yards, 1:17; San Diego State 21–7)

Second quarter

- (12:29) SDSU – Daniel Bellinger 25-yard pass from Jordon Brookshire, Matt Araiza kick (Drive: 7 plays, 78 yards, 3:35; San Diego State 28–7)
- (1:52) SDSU – Ethan Dedeaux 40-yard pass from Jordon Brookshire, Matt Araiza kick (Drive: 3 plays, 56 yards, 0:55; San Diego State 35–7)

Third quarter

- (5:13) SDSU – Matt Araiza 32-yard field goal (Drive: 6 plays, 6 yards, 3:22; San Diego State 38–7)

Fourth quarter

- (8:24) ARIZ – Tayvian Cunningham 7-yard pass from Will Plummer, Tyler Loop kick (Drive: 11 plays, 80 yards, 2:52; San Diego State 38–14)

Statistics	SDSU	ARIZ
First downs	21	9
Total yards	454	230
Rushing yards	55–271	20–51
Passing yards	183	179
Passing: Comp–Att–Int	10–15–0	18–36–1
Time of possession	37:34	22:26

Team	Category	Player	Statistics
San Diego State	Passing	Jordon Brookshire	10/14, 183 yards, 2 TD
San Diego State	Rushing	Greg Bell	17 carries, 125 yards, TD
San Diego State	Receiving	Daniel Bellinger	3 receptions, 113 yards, TD
Arizona	Passing	Will Plummer	8/17, 109 yards, TD
Arizona	Rushing	Stanley Berryhill III	2 carries, 26 yards
Arizona	Receiving	Tayvian Cunningham	5 receptions, 81 yards, TD

=== vs Northern Arizona ===
Northern Arizona Lumberjacks (0–2) vs Arizona Wildcats (0–2) – Game summary

Quarter	1	2	3	4	Total
Lumberjacks	0	7	7	7	21
Wildcats	10	3	0	6	19

at Arizona Stadium • Tucson, AZ

- Date: September 18, 2021
- Game time: 7:00 P.M.
- Game weather: Sunny, 82 °F (28 °C)
- Game attendance: 33,481
- Referee: Mike McCabe
- TV announcers (Pac-12 Network): Chris Fisher (play-by-play), Lance Briggs (analyst)

Game information

First quarter

- (5:13) ARIZ – Lucas Havrisik 31-yard field goal (Drive: 4 plays, 5 yards, 1:51; Arizona 3–0)
- (2:05) ARIZ – Boobie Curry 49-yard pass from Will Plummer, Lucas Havrisik kick (Drive: 4 plays, 68 yards, 1:01; Arizona 10–0)

Second quarter

- (13:05) ARIZ – Lucas Havrisik 24-yard field goal (Drive: 7 plays, 18 yards, 2:10; Arizona 13–0)
- (1:48) NAU – Brady Shough 28-yard interception return, Luis Aguilar kick (Arizona 13–7)

Third quarter

- (4:16) NAU – Kevin Daniels 12-yard run, Luis Aguilar kick (Drive: 7 plays, 65 yards, 3:05; Northern Arizona 14–13)

Fourth quarter

- (7:53) NAU – Hendrix Johnson 9-yard pass from RJ Martinez, Luis Aguilar kick (Drive: 10 plays, 60 yards, 5:00; Northern Arizona 21–13)
- (2:16) ARIZ – Boobie Curry 3-yard pass from Jordan McCloud, two-point pass failed (Drive: 7 plays, 85 yards, 2:14; Northern Arizona 21–19)

Statistics	NAU	ARIZ
First downs	15	19
Total yards	240	363
Rushing yards	45–148	27–106
Passing yards	92	257
Passing: Comp–Att–Int	12–20–2	25–41–2
Time of possession	34:41	24:51

Team	Category	Player	Statistics
Northern Arizona	Passing	RJ Martinez	11/16, 88 yards, TD, INT
Northern Arizona	Rushing	Kevin Daniels	27 carries, 127 yards, TD
Northern Arizona	Receiving	Draycen Hall	4 receptions, 48 yards
Arizona	Passing	Will Plummer	19/34, 191 yards, TD, 2 INT
Arizona	Rushing	Drake Anderson	12 carries, 72 yards
Arizona	Receiving	Stanley Berryhill III	11 receptions, 94 yards

=== at No. 3 Oregon ===
Arizona Wildcats (0–3) at No. 3 Oregon Ducks (3–0) – Game summary

Quarter	1	2	3	4	Total
Wildcats	7	3	9	0	19
#3 Ducks	17	7	0	17	41

at Autzen Stadium • Eugene, OR

- Date: September 25, 2021
- Game time: 7:30 P.M.
- Game weather: Cloudy, 66 °F (19 °C)
- Game attendance: 50,024
- Referee: Francisco Villar
- TV announcers (ESPN): Dave Flemming (play by play), Rod Gilmore (analyst), Stormy Buonantony (sideline reporter)

Game information

First quarter

- (14:28) ORE – Jaylon Redd 63-yard pass from Anthony Brown, Camden Lewis kick (Drive: 3 plays, 75 yards, 1:02; Oregon 7–0)
- (2:56) ORE – Camden Lewis 21-yard field goal (Drive: 7 plays, 22 yards, 2:56; Oregon 10–0)
- (14:28) ARIZ – Bryce Wolma 11-yard pass from Jordan McCloud, Lucas Havrisik kick (Drive: 10 plays, 91 yards, 4:30; Oregon 10–7)
- (1:57) ORE – CJ Verdell 11-yard run, Camden Lewis kick (Drive: 5 plays, 75 yards, 1:59; Oregon 17–7)

Second quarter

- (5:09) ORE – Terrance Ferguson 9-yard pass from Anthony Brown, Camden Lewis kick (Drive: 8 plays, 80 yards, 3:41; Oregon 24–7)
- (2:56) ARIZ – Lucas Havrisik 28-yard field goal (Drive: 12 plays, 70 yards, 5:30; Oregon 24–10)

Third quarter

- (3:12) ARIZ – Team safety (Oregon 24–12)
- (1:57) ARIZ – Drake Anderson 1-yard run, Lucas Havrisik kick (Drive: 12 plays, 71 yards, 5:30; Oregon 24–19)

Fourth quarter

- (2:56) ORE – Camden Lewis 43-yard field goal (Drive: 9 plays, 50 yards, 2:59; Oregon 27–19)
- (10:02) ORE – Spencer Webb 18-yard pass from Anthony Brown, Camden Lewis kick (Drive: 7 plays, 59 yards, 4:00; Oregon 34–19)
- (1:48) ORE – Bennett Williams 68-yard interception return, Camden Lewis kick (Oregon 41–19)

Statistics	ARIZ	ORE
First downs	31	17
Total yards	435	393
Rushing yards	53–202	31–187
Passing yards	233	206
Passing: Comp–Att–Int	21–35–5	10–24–0
Time of possession	37:58	22:02

Team	Category	Player	Statistics
Arizona	Passing	Jordan McCloud	21/35, 233 yards, TD, 5 INT
Arizona	Rushing	Drake Anderson	21 carries, 67 yards, TD
Arizona	Receiving	Stanley Berryhill III	5 receptions, 75 yards
Oregon	Passing	Anthony Brown	10/21, 206 yards, 3 TD
Oregon	Rushing	Travis Dye	5 carries, 92 yards
Oregon	Receiving	Jaylon Redd	1 reception, 63 yards, TD

=== vs UCLA ===
UCLA Bruins (3–2) vs Arizona Wildcats (0–4) – Game summary

Quarter	1	2	3	4	Total
Bruins	7	7	10	10	34
Wildcats	3	10	3	0	16

at Arizona Stadium • Tucson, AZ

- Date: October 9, 2021
- Game time: 7:30 P.M.
- Game weather: Sunny, 76 °F (24 °C)
- Game attendance: 43,258
- Referee: Chris Coyte
- TV announcers (ESPN): Dave Flemming (play by play), Rod Gilmore (analyst), Stormy Buonantony (sideline reporter)

Game information

First quarter

- (9:03) ARIZ – Lucas Havrisik 28-yard field goal (Drive: 14 plays, 65 yards, 5:57; Arizona 3–0)
- (3:48) UCLA – Greg Dulcich 3-yard pass from Dorian Thompson-Robinson, Nicholas Barr-Mira kick (Drive: 13 plays, 75 yards, 5:15; UCLA 7–0)

Second quarter

- (14:18) ARIZ – Lucas Havrisik 46-yard field goal (Drive: 12 plays, 47 yards, 4:30; UCLA 7–6)
- (3:01) UCLA – Dorian Thompson-Robinson 2-yard run, Nicholas Barr-Mira kick (Drive: 9 plays, 72 yards, 4:00; UCLA 14–6)
- (0:30) ARIZ – Michael Wiley 10-yard pass from Jamarye Joiner, Tyler Loop kick (Drive: 9 plays, 75 yards, 2:31; UCLA 14–13)

Third quarter

- (13:17) UCLA – Nicholas Barr-Mira 23-yard field goal (Drive: 5 plays, 15 yards, 1:33; UCLA 17–13)
- (8:18) ARIZ – Lucas Havrisik 46-yard field goal (Drive: 11 plays, 48 yards, 4:59; UCLA 17–16)
- (4:06) UCLA – Dorian Thompson-Robinson 4-yard run, Nicholas Barr-Mira kick (Drive: 9 plays, 75 yards, 4:12; UCLA 24–16)

Fourth quarter

- (7:48) UCLA – Brittain Brown 48-yard run, Nicholas Barr-Mira kick (Drive: 6 plays, 69 yards, 3:17; UCLA 31–16)
- (1:43) UCLA – Nicholas Barr-Mira 43-yard field goal (Drive: 12 plays, 35 yards, 5:24; UCLA 34–16)

Statistics	UCLA	ARIZ
First downs	22	27
Total yards	411	362
Rushing yards	47–329	42–122
Passing yards	82	154
Passing: Comp–Att–Int	8–19–1	26–38–0
Time of possession	29:37	30:23

Team	Category	Player	Statistics
UCLA	Passing	Dorian Thompson-Robinson	8/19, 82 yards, TD, INT
UCLA	Rushing	Brittain Brown	12 carries, 146 yards, TD
UCLA	Receiving	Greg Dulcich	3 receptions, 36 yards, TD
Arizona	Passing	Jordan McCloud	21/30, 182 yards
Arizona	Rushing	Drake Anderson	16 carries, 58 yards
Arizona	Receiving	Stanley Berryhill III	7 receptions, 59 yards

=== at Colorado ===
Arizona Wildcats (0–5) at Colorado Buffaloes (1–4) – Game summary

Quarter	1	2	3	4	Total
Wildcats	0	0	0	0	0
Buffaloes	3	3	21	7	34

at Folsom Field • Boulder, CO

- Date: October 16, 2021
- Game time: 12:30 P.M.
- Game weather: Sunny, 64 °F (18 °C)
- Game attendance: 49,806
- Referee: Matthew Richards
- TV announcers (Pac-12 Network): Ted Robinson (play-by-play), Yogi Roth (analyst)

Game information

First quarter

- (8:26) COLO – Cole Becker 19-yard field goal (Drive: 10 plays, 68 yards, 4:22; Colorado 3–0)

Second quarter

- (7:14) COLO – Cole Becker 37-yard field goal (Drive: 7 plays, 61 yards, 2:52; Colorado 6–0)

Third quarter

- (6:46) COLO – Trevor Woods 36-yard punt return, Cole Becker kick (Colorado 13–0)
- (5:32) COLO – Carson Wells 50-yard interception return, Cole Becker kick (Colorado 20–0)
- (1:42) COLO – Brenden Rice 62-yard pass from Brendon Lewis, Cole Becker kick (Drive: 4 plays, 80 yards, 1:15; Colorado 27–0)

Fourth quarter

- (4:08) COLO – Dimitri Stanley 11-yard pass from Brendon Lewis, Cole Becker kick (Drive: 9 plays, 70 yards, 4:45; Arizona 34–0)

Statistics	ARIZ	COLO
First downs	19	18
Total yards	280	365
Rushing yards	31–127	39–117
Passing yards	153	248
Passing: Comp–Att–Int	20–39–2	12–19–0
Time of possession	30:58	29:02

Team	Category	Player	Statistics
Arizona	Passing	Gunner Cruz	13/22, 82 yards, INT
Arizona	Rushing	Jalen John	11 carries, 71 yards
Arizona	Receiving	Stanley Berryhill III	8 receptions, 48 yards
Colorado	Passing	Brendon Lewis	12/19, 248 yards, 2 TD
Colorado	Rushing	Jarek Broussard	13 carries, 53 yards
Colorado	Receiving	Brenden Rice	3 receptions, 111 yards, TD

=== vs Washington ===
Washington Huskies (2–4) vs Arizona Wildcats (0–6) – Game summary

Quarter	1	2	3	4	Total
Huskies	0	0	7	14	21
Wildcats	3	10	3	0	16

at Arizona Stadium • Tucson, AZ

- Date: October 22, 2021
- Game time: 7:30 P.M.
- Game weather: Sunny, 75 °F (24 °C)
- Game attendance: 30,880
- Referee: Steve Strimling
- TV announcers (ESPN2): Clay Matvick (play-by-play), Rocky Boiman (analyst), Tiffany Blackmon (sideline reporter)

Game information

First quarter

- (9:01) ARIZ – Tyler Loop 34-yard field goal (Drive: 4 plays, 7 yards, 1:48; Washington 3–0)

Second quarter

- (8:16) ARIZ – Jamarye Joiner 1-yard run, Tyler Loop kick (Drive: 10 plays, 64 yards, 3:40; Washington 41–20)
- (2:23) ARIZ – Lucas Havrisik 50-yard field goal (Drive: 6 plays, 60 yards, 1:49; Washington 6–3)

Third quarter

- (9:41) WASH – Terrell Bynum 16-yard pass from Dylan Morris, Peyton Henry kick (Drive: 8 plays, 80 yards, 3:21; Washington 20–17)
- (2:31) ARIZ – Tyler Loop 35-yard field goal (Drive: 15 plays, 58 yards, 7:10; Washington 27–20)

Fourth quarter

- (11:39) WASH – Cameron Davis 9-yard run, Peyton Henry kick (Drive: 4 plays, 71 yards, 1:19; Washington 41–20)
- (6:44) WASH – Rome Odunze 8-yard pass from Dylan Morris, Peyton Henry kick (Drive: 7 plays, 82 yards, 3:17; Washington 34–20)

Statistics	WASH	ARIZ
First downs	16	15
Total yards	305	280
Rushing yards	38–88	40–218
Passing yards	217	62
Passing: Comp–Att–Int	13–22–0	13–21–2
Time of possession	30:32	29:28

Team	Category	Player	Statistics
Washington	Passing	Dylan Morris	13/21, 217 yards, 2 TD
Washington	Rushing	Sean McGrew	17 carries, 43 yards
Washington	Receiving	Terrell Bynum	5 receptions, 143 yards, TD
Arizona	Passing	Will Plummer	13/20, 62 yards, 2 INT
Arizona	Rushing	Stevie Rocker Jr.	8 carries, 87 yards
Arizona	Receiving	Stanley Berryhill III	6 receptions, 20 yards

=== at USC ===
Arizona Wildcats (0–7) at USC Trojans (3–4) – Game summary

Quarter	1	2	3	4	Total
Wildcats	7	7	7	13	34
Trojans	14	21	3	3	41

at Los Angeles Memorial Coliseum • Los Angeles, CA

- Date: October 30, 2021
- Game time: 4:00 P.M.
- Game weather: Sunny, 70 °F (21 °C)
- Game attendance: 52,435
- Referee: Michael Mothershed
- TV announcers (ESPNU): John Schriffen (play by play), Rene Ingoglia (analyst)

Game information

First quarter

- (11:23) USC – Keaontay Ingram 3-yard run, Alex Stadthaus kick (Drive: 8 plays, 75 yards, 3:37; USC 7–0)
- (10:31) ARIZ – Tayvian Cunningham 73-yard pass from Jamarye Joiner, Tyler Loop kick (Drive: 3 plays, 75 yards, 0:52; Tied 7–7)
- (9:53) USC – Gary Bryant Jr. 62-yard pass from Kedon Slovis, Alex Stadthaus kick (Drive: 2 plays, 75 yards, 0:38; USC 14–7)

Second quarter

- (7:59) USC – Drake London 2-yard pass from Jaxon Dart, Alex Stadthaus kick (Drive: 15 plays, 96 yards, 4:32; USC 21–7)
- (4:16) USC – Drake London 6-yard pass from Jaxon Dart, Alex Stadthaus kick (Drive: 6 plays, 62 yards, 2:45; USC 28–7)
- (2:36) ARIZ – Michael Wiley 1-yard run, Tyler Loop kick (Drive: 6 plays, 75 yards, 1:40; USC 28–14)
- (0:32) USC – Gary Bryant Jr. 15-yard pass from Kedon Slovis, Alex Stadthaus kick (Drive: 8 plays, 75 yards, 2:04; USC 35–14)

Third quarter

- (10:44) ARIZ – Anthony Pandy 37-yard interception return, Tyler Loop kick (USC 35–21)
- (6:48) USC – Alex Stadthaus 23-yard field goal (Drive: 12 plays, 68 yards, 3:51; USC 38–21)

Fourth quarter

- (12:50) ARIZ – Will Plummer 16-yard run, Tyler Loop kick (Drive: 9 plays, 60 yards, 3:55; USC 38–28)
- (6:04) ARIZ – Tyler Loop 25-yard field goal (Drive: 13 plays, 72 yards, 2:55; USC 38–31)
- (3:19) USC – Alex Stadthaus 40-yard field goal (Drive: 5 plays, 52 yards, 2:45; USC 41–31)
- (1:26) ARIZ – Tyler Loop 40-yard field goal (Drive: 10 plays, 52 yards, 1:53; USC 41–34)

Statistics	ARIZ	USC
First downs	24	35
Total yards	466	547
Rushing yards	32–127	44–234
Passing yards	339	313
Passing: Comp–Att–Int	22–39–0	27–39–1
Time of possession	27:02	32:58

Team	Category	Player	Statistics
Arizona	Passing	Will Plummer	20/34, 264 yards
Arizona	Rushing	Jalen John	9 carries, 35 yards
Arizona	Receiving	Tayvian Cunningham	3 receptions, 116 yards, TD
USC	Passing	Kedon Slovis	15/21, 204 yards, 2 TD, INT
USC	Rushing	Keaontay Ingram	27 carries, 204 yards, TD
USC	Receiving	Gary Bryant Jr.	3 receptions, 89 yards, 2 TD

=== vs California ===
California Golden Bears (3–5) vs Arizona Wildcats (0–8) – Game summary

Quarter	1	2	3	4	Total
Golden Bears	0	0	3	0	3
Wildcats	0	0	3	7	10

at Arizona Stadium • Tucson, AZ

- Date: November 6, 2021
- Game time: 1:30 P.M.
- Game weather: Sunny, 84 °F (29 °C)
- Game attendance: 30,677
- Referee: Mark Duddy
- TV announcers (Pac-12 Network): Roxy Bernstein (play by play), Lincoln Kennedy (analyst)

Game information

First quarter

- No scoring plays

Second quarter

- No scoring plays

Third quarter

- (5:46) ARIZ – Tyler Loop 29-yard field goal (Drive: 10 plays, 61 yards, 5:07; Arizona 3–0)
- (2:09) CAL – Nick Lopez 34-yard field goal (Drive: 9 plays, 59 yards, 3:37; Tied 3–3)

Fourth quarter

- (2:17) ARIZ – Michael Wiley 10-yard run, Tyler Loop kick (Drive: 8 plays, 55 yards, 2:39; Arizona 10–3)

Statistics	CAL	ARIZ
First downs	9	21
Total yards	122	331
Rushing yards	24–28	52–202
Passing yards	94	129
Passing: Comp–Att–Int	11–29–0	16–30–3
Time of possession	24:11	35:10

Team	Category	Player	Statistics
California	Passing	Ryan Glover	11/29, 94 yards
California	Rushing	Christopher Brooks	11 carries, 31 yards
California	Receiving	Kekoa Crawford	5 receptions, 56 yards
Arizona	Passing	Will Plummer	16/28, 129 yards, 2 INT
Arizona	Rushing	Will Plummer	11 carries, 68 yards
Arizona	Receiving	Dorian Singer	5 receptions, 46 yards

=== vs No. 24 Utah ===
No. 24 Utah Utes (6–3) vs Arizona Wildcats (1–8) – Game summary

Quarter	1	2	3	4	Total
#24 Utes	7	14	10	7	38
Wildcats	14	3	3	9	29

at Arizona Stadium • Tucson, AZ

- Date: November 13, 2021
- Game time: 12:00 P.M.
- Game weather: Sunny, 81 °F (27 °C)
- Game attendance: 32,008
- Referee: Chris Coyte
- TV announcers (Pac-12 Network): Roxy Bernstein (play by play), Lincoln Kennedy (analyst)

Game information

First quarter

- (10:05) UTAH – Cameron Rising 11-yard run, Jadon Redding kick (Drive: 9 plays, 75 yards, 4:55; Utah 7–0)
- (7:44) ARIZ – Will Plummer 43-yard run, Tyler Loop kick (Drive: 7 plays, 65 yards, 2:21; Tied 7–7)
- (1:41) ARIZ – Michael Wiley 6-yard pass from Will Plummer, Tyler Loop kick (Drive: 10 plays, 72 yards, 4:03; Arizona 14–7)

Second quarter

- (14:55) UTAH – T.J. Pledger 15-yard run, Jadon Redding kick (Drive: 6 plays, 75 yards, 1:46; Tied 14–14)
- (1:24) ARIZ – Lucas Havrisik 57-yard field goal (Drive: 7 plays, 22 yards, 2:46; Arizona 17–14)
- (0:02) UTAH – Brant Kuithe 2-yard pass from Cameron Rising, Jadon Redding kick (Drive: 9 plays, 75 yards, 1:22; Utah 21–17)

Third quarter

- (11:33) ARIZ – Tyler Loop 31-yard field goal (Drive: 10 plays, 62 yards, 3:27; Utah 21–20)
- (6:58) UTAH – Jadon Redding 30-yard field goal (Drive: 10 plays, 63 yards, 4:35; Utah 24–20)
- (2:57) UTAH – Dalton Kincaid 17-yard pass from Cameron Rising, Jadon Redding kick (Drive: 6 plays, 76 yards, 2:32; Utah 31–20)

Fourth quarter

- (11:31) ARIZ – Tyler Loop 22-yard field goal (Drive: 15 plays, 76 yards, 6:19; Utah 31–23)
- (10:34) ARIZ – Rhedi Short 3-yard blocked punt return, two-point run failed (Utah 31–29)
- (2:10) UTAH – T.J. Pledger 2-yard run, Jadon Redding kick (Drive: 15 plays, 75 yards, 8:24; Utah 38–29)

Statistics	UTAH	ARIZ
First downs	26	16
Total yards	174	102
Rushing yards	44–174	30–102
Passing yards	294	227
Passing: Comp–Att–Int	19–30–0	20–35–0
Time of possession	33:51	26:09

Team	Category	Player	Statistics
Utah	Passing	Cameron Rising	19/30, 294 yards, 2 TD
Utah	Rushing	T.J. Pledger	25 carries, 119 yards, 2 TD
Utah	Receiving	Micah Bernard	3 receptions, 60 yards
Arizona	Passing	Will Plummer	19/34, 223 yards, TD
Arizona	Rushing	Will Plummer	10 carries, 50 yards, TD
Arizona	Receiving	Dorian Singer	5 receptions, 84 yards

=== at Washington State ===
Arizona Wildcats (1–9) at Washington State Cougars (5–5) – Game summary

Quarter	1	2	3	4	Total
Wildcats	0	7	3	8	18
Cougars	7	14	16	7	44

at Martin Stadium • Pullman, WA

- Date: November 19, 2021
- Game time: 12:30 P.M.
- Game weather: Light snow, 32 °F (0 °C)
- Game attendance: 31,711
- Referee: Matthew Richards
- TV announcers (Pac-12 Network): J.B. Long (play by play), Maurice Jones-Drew (analyst)

Game information

First quarter

- (7:11) WSU – Max Borghi 26-yard run, Dean Janikowski kick (Drive: 8 plays, 55 yards, 3:28; Washington State 7–0)

Second quarter

- (4:28) WSU – Travell Harris 8-yard pass from Jayden de Laura, Dean Janikowski kick (Drive: 7 plays, 69 yards, 3:13; Washington State 14–0)
- (2:22) ARIZ – Boobie Curry 11-yard pass from Will Plummer, Tyler Loop kick (Drive: 5 plays, 90 yards, 1:59; Washington State 14–7)
- (1:26) WSU – Calvin Jackson Jr. 43-yard pass from Jayden de Laura, Dean Janikowski kick (Drive: 3 plays, 75 yards, 0:56; Washington State 21–7)

Third quarter

- (10:07) WSU – Max Borghi 2-yard run, Dean Janikowski kick (Drive: 6 plays, 69 yards, 2:36; Washington State 28–7)
- (8:54) WSU – Team safety (Washington State 30–7)
- (7:10) WSU – Travell Harris 31-yard pass from Jayden de Laura, Dean Janikowski kick (Drive: 4 plays, 60 yards, 1:40; Washington State 37–7)
- (2:39) ARIZ – Tyler Loop 42-yard field goal (Drive: 11 plays, 51 yards, 4:31; Washington State 37–10)

Fourth quarter

- (12:16) ARIZ – Michael Wiley 27-yard pass from Will Plummer, Will Plummer two-point pass to Dorian Singer (Drive: 10 plays, 80 yards, 3:11; Washington State 37–18)
- (8:37) WSU – Calvin Jackson Jr. 78-yard pass from Jayden de Laura, Dean Janikowski kick (Drive: 2 plays, 78 yards, 0:17; Washington State 44–18)

Statistics	ARIZ	WSU
First downs	18	18
Total yards	374	482
Rushing yards	30–168	36–223
Passing yards	206	259
Passing: Comp–Att–Int	23–42–1	13–23–0
Time of possession	31:35	28:25

Team	Category	Player	Statistics
Arizona	Passing	Will Plummer	23/42, 206 yards, 2 TD, INT
Arizona	Rushing	Drake Anderson	8 carries, 92 yards
Arizona	Receiving	Michael Wiley	8 receptions, 87 yards, TD
Washington State	Passing	Jayden de Laura	13/23, 259 yards, 4 TD
Washington State	Rushing	Max Borghi	16 carries, 139 yards, 2 TD
Washington State	Receiving	Calvin Jackson Jr.	4 receptions, 133 yards, 2 TD

=== at Arizona State ===
Arizona Wildcats (1–10) at Arizona State Sun Devils (7–4) – Game summary

Quarter	1	2	3	4	Total
Wildcats	3	6	6	0	15
Sun Devils	7	7	17	7	38

at Sun Devil Stadium • Tempe, AZ

- Date: November 27, 2021
- Game time: 2:00 P.M.
- Game weather: Sunny, 73 °F (23 °C)
- Game attendance: 52,305
- Referee: Steve Strimling
- TV announcers (Pac-12 Network): Ted Robinson (play by play), Yogi Roth (analyst)

Game information

First quarter

- (10:37) ARIZ – Tyler Loop 32-yard field goal (Drive: 9 plays, 77 yards, 4:17; Arizona 3–0)
- (6:14) ASU – Ricky Pearsall 14-yard pass from Jayden Daniels, Christian Zendejas kick (Drive: 9 plays, 75 yards, 4:23; Arizona State 7–3)

Second quarter

- (14:55) ARIZ – Tyler Loop 26-yard field goal (Drive: 12 plays, 67 yards, 6:19; Arizona State 7–6)
- (12:12) ASU – Rachaad White 1-yard run, Christian Zendejas kick (Drive: 1 play, 1 yard, 0:03; Arizona State 14–6)
- (2:19) ARIZ – Tyler Loop 32-yard field goal (Drive: 8 plays, 81 yards, 3:14; Arizona State 14–9)

Third quarter

- (13:07) ASU – Jayden Daniels 48-yard run, Christian Zendejas kick (Drive: 4 plays, 67 yards, 1:46; Arizona State 21–9)
- (9:35) ARIZ – Michael Wiley 5-yard pass from Will Plummer, two-point pass failed (Drive: 9 plays, 54 yards, 3:27; Arizona State 21–15)
- (4:50) ASU – Ricky Pearsall 14-yard pass from Jayden Daniels, Jayden Daniels two-point pass to Curtis Hodges (Drive: 10 plays, 78 yards, 4:38; Arizona State 29–15)
- (1:44) ASU – Team safety (Arizona State 31–15)

Fourth quarter

- (9:49) ASU – Jack Jones 87-yard interception return, Christian Zendejas kick (Arizona State 38–15)

Statistics	ARIZ	ASU
First downs	22	16
Total yards	396	314
Rushing yards	34–50	37–228
Passing yards	346	86
Passing: Comp–Att–Int	28–39–1	10–14–0
Time of possession	35:31	24:29

Team	Category	Player	Statistics
Arizona	Passing	Will Plummer	28/38, 346 yards, TD, INT
Arizona	Rushing	Jamarye Joiner	5 carries, 28 yards
Arizona	Receiving	Stanley Berryhill III	10 receptions, 104 yards
Arizona State	Passing	Jayden Daniels	10/14, 86 yards, 2 TD
Arizona State	Rushing	Rachaad White	21 carries, 98 yards, TD
Arizona State	Receiving	Ricky Pearsall	5 receptions, 52 yards, 2 TD

== Statistics ==
=== Team statistics ===
Team Statistics
	Arizona	Opponents
Points		
First Downs		
Rushing		
Passing		
Penalty		
Rushing Yards		
Rushing Attempts		
Average Per Rush		
Long		
Rushing TDs		
Passing Yards		
Comp–Att		
Comp %		
Average Per Game		
Average per Attempt		
Passing TDs		
INTs		
Rating		
Touchdowns		
Passing		
Rushing		
Defensive		
Interceptions		
Yards		
Long		
Total Offense		
Total Plays		
Average Per Yards/Game		
Kick Returns: # – Yards		
TDs		
Long		
Punts		
Yards		
Average		
Punt Returns: # – Yards		
TDs		
Long		
Fumbles – Fumbles Lost		
Opposing TDs		
Penalties – Yards		
3rd–Down Conversion %		
4th–Down Conversion %		
Takeaways		
Field Goals		
Extra Point		
Sacks		
Sack Against		
Yards		

=== Offense ===
Passing statistics
#	NAME	POS	RAT	CMP	ATT	YDS	Y/A	CMP%	TD	INT	LONG
#4	Jordan McCloud	QB	—	—	—	—	—	—	—	—	—
#9	Gunner Cruz	QB	—	—	—	—	—	—	—	—	–
#12	Brayden Zermeno	QB	—	—	—	—	—	—	—	—	—
#13	Luke Ashworth	QB	—	—	—	—	—	—	—	—	—
#15	Will Plummer	QB	—	—	—	—	—	—	—	—	—
#17	Jaden White	QB	—	—	—	—	—	—	—	—	–
	TOTALS		-	-	-	-	-	-	-	-	-
	OPPONENTS		—	—	—	—	—	—	—	—	—

Rushing statistics
#	NAME	POS	CAR	YDS	AVG	LONG	TD
#6	Michael Wiley	RB	—	—	—	—	—
#8	Drake Anderson	RB	—	—	—	—	—
#20	Bam Smith	RB	—	—	—	—	—
#21	Jalen John	RB	—	—	—	—	—
#23	Stevie Rocker	RB	—	—	—	—	—
#28	Nazar Bombata	RB	—	—	—	—	—
#29	Jashon Butler	RB	—	—	—	—	—
#33	James Bohls	RB	—	—	—	—	—
	TOTALS		-	-	-	-	-
	OPPONENTS		—	—	—	—	—

Receiving statistics
#	NAME	POS	REC	YDS	AVG	LONG	TD
#1	Stanley Berryhill	WR	—	—	—	—	—
#2	Boobie Curry	WR	—	—	—	—	—
#3	Jalen Johnson	WR	—	—	—	—	—
#5	Brian Casteel	WR	—	—	—	—	—
#7	Jaden Mitchell	WR	—	—	—	—	– –
#10	Jamarye Joiner	WR	—	—	—	—	—
#11	Tayvian Cunningham	WR	—	—	—	—	—
#16	Thomas Reid II	WR	—	—	—	—	—
#18	Ma'Jon Wright	WR	—	—	—	—	—
#24	Dorian Singer	WR	—	—	—	—	—
#25	Anthony Simpson	WR	—	—	—	—	—
#26	Jaden Clark	WR	—	—	—	—	—
#44	Clay Markoff	TE	—	—	—	—	—
#80	Connor Hutchings	TE	—	—	—	—	—
#81	Bryce Wolma	TE	—	—	—	—	—
#82	Zach Williams	TE	—	—	—	—	—
#83	Colby Powers	TE	—	—	—	—	—
#84	Tristen D'Angelo	WR	—	—	—	—	—
#85	Roberto Miranda	TE	—	—	—	—	–
#87	Stacey Marshall	TE	—	—	—	—	—
#88	Alex Lines	TE	—	—	—	—	—
	TOTALS		-	-	-	-	-
	OPPONENTS		—	—	—	—	—

=== Defense ===
Defense statistics
#	NAME	POS	SOLO	AST	TOT	TFL-YDS	SACK-YDS	INT	BU	QBH	FR-YDS	FF	BLK	SAF	TD
#1	Jalen Harris	DL	—	—	—	—	—	—	—	—	—	—	—	—	–
#2	Isaiah Rutherford	DB	—	—	—	—	—	—	—	—	—	—	—	—	–
#3	Jaydin Young	DB	—	—	—	—	—	—	—	—	—	—	—	—	—
#4	Christian Roland-Wallace	DB	—	—	—	—	—	—	—	—	—	—	—	—	—
#5	Christian Young	DB	—	—	—	—	—	—	—	—	—	—	—	—	—
#6	Jason Harris	LB	—	—	—	—	—	—	—	—	—	—	—	—	—
#7	Rhedi Short	DB	—	—	—	—	—	—	—	—	—	—	—	—	–
#8	Anthony Pandy	LB	—	—	—	—	—	—	—	—	—	—	—	—	–
#9	Gunner Maldonado	DB	—	—	—	—	—	—	—	—	—	—	—	—	–
#10	Jabar Triplett	LB	—	—	—	—	—	—	—	—	—	—	—	—	–
#11	Kolbe Cage	LB	—	—	—	—	—	—	—	—	—	—	—	—	—
#12	JB Brown	DL	—	—	—	—	—	—	—	—	—	—	—	—	—
#13	Isaiah Mays	DB	—	—	—	—	—	—	—	—	—	—	—	—	—
#14	Logan Kraut	LB	—	—	—	—	—	—	—	—	—	—	—	—	—
#15	McKenzie Barnes	DB	—	—	—	—	—	—	—	—	—	—	—	—	—
#16	Dalton Johnson	DB	—	—	—	—	—	—	—	—	—	—	—	—	—
#17	Regen Terry	DL	—	—	—	—	—	—	—	—	—	—	—	—	—
#18	Kenny Hebert	LB	—	—	—	—	—	—	—	—	—	—	—	—	—
#19	Adama Fall	DB	—	—	—	—	—	—	—	—	—	—	—	—	—
#20	Treydan Stukes	DB	—	—	—	—	—	—	—	—	—	—	—	—	—
#21	Jaxen Turner	DB	—	—	—	—	—	—	—	—	—	—	—	—	—
#23	Malik Hausman	DB	—	—	—	—	—	—	—	—	—	—	—	—	—
#23	Treshaun Hayward	LB	—	—	—	—	—	—	—	—	—	—	—	—	–
#25	Javione Carr	DB	—	—	—	—	—	—	—	—	—	—	—	—	—
#26	Mo Diallo	DL	—	—	—	—	—	—	—	—	—	—	—	—	—
#27	Jakelyn Morgan	DB	—	—	—	—	—	—	—	—	—	—	—	—	—
#28	Isaiah Taylor	DB	—	—	—	—	—	—	—	—	—	—	—	—	—
#29	Jackson Bailey	LB	—	—	—	—	—	—	—	—	—	—	—	—	—
#30	Anthony Gonzales	DB	—	—	—	—	—	—	—	—	—	—	—	—	—
#31	Trey Cartledge	DB	—	—	—	—	—	—	—	—	—	—	—	—	—
#32	Matthew Weerts	LB	—	—	—	—	—	—	—	—	—	—	—	—	—
#34	John Burton	LB	—	—	—	—	—	—	—	—	—	—	—	—	—
#35	Rashie Hodge Jr.	DB	—	—	—	—	—	—	—	—	—	—	—	—	—
#36	RJ Edwards	LB	—	—	—	—	—	—	—	—	—	—	—	—	—
#37	Kevon Garcia	LB	—	—	—	—	—	—	—	—	—	—	—	—	–
#38	Dante Smith	LB	—	—	—	—	—	—	—	—	—	—	—	—	—
#39	Jeffrey Robinson	DB	—	—	—	—	—	—	—	—	—	—	—	—	—
#40	Ammon Allen	LB	—	—	—	—	—	—	—	—	—	—	—	—	—
#41	Eddie Siaumau-Sanitoa	DL	—	—	—	—	—	—	—	—	—	—	—	—	—
#42	D.J. Fryar	LB	—	—	—	—	—	—	—	—	—	—	—	—	–
#44	Shontrail Key	DL	—	—	—	—	—	—	—	—	—	—	—	—	—
#45	Issaiah Johnson	DL	—	—	—	—	—	—	—	—	—	—	—	—	–
#46	Victor Zayas	LB	—	—	—	—	—	—	—	—	—	—	—	—	—
#47	Rourke Freeburg	LB	—	—	—	—	—	—	—	—	—	—	—	—	—
#48	Jerry Roberts	LB	—	—	—	—	—	—	—	—	—	—	—	—	–
#51	Chandler Kelly	LB	—	—	—	—	—	—	—	—	—	—	—	—	—
#52	Aaron Blackwell	DL	—	—	—	—	—	—	—	—	—	—	—	—	—
#53	Malik Reed	LB	—	—	—	—	—	—	—	—	—	—	—	—	—
#55	Nahe Sulung	DL	—	—	—	—	—	—	—	—	—	—	—	—	—
#58	Evan Branch-Haynes	DL	—	—	—	—	—	—	—	—	—	—	—	—	—
#90	Trevon Mason	DL	—	—	—	—	—	—	—	—	—	—	—	—	—
#91	Alex Navarro-Silva	DL	—	—	—	—	—	—	—	—	—	—	—	—	—
#92	Kyon Barrs	DL	—	—	—	—	—	—	—	—	—	—	—	—	—
#93	Ugochukwu Nosike	DL	—	—	—	—	—	—	—	—	—	—	—	—	—
#94	Dion Wilson Jr.	DL	—	—	—	—	—	—	—	—	—	—	—	—	—
#95	Paris Shand	DL	—	—	—	—	—	—	—	—	—	—	—	—	–
#96	Reid Codwell	DL	—	—	—	—	—	—	—	—	—	—	—	—	—
#97	Leevel Tatum III	DL	—	—	—	—	—	—	—	—	—	—	—	—	—
#99	Myles Tapusoa	DL	—	—	—	—	—	—	—	—	—	—	—	—	—
	TOTAL		-	-	-	-	-	-	-	-	-	-	-	-	-
	OPPONENTS		—	—	—	—	—	—	—	—	—	—	—	—	—

Key: POS: Position, SOLO: Solo Tackles, AST: Assisted Tackles, TOT: Total Tackles, TFL: Tackles-for-loss, SACK: Quarterback Sacks, INT: Interceptions, BU: Passes Broken Up, PD: Passes Defended, QBH: Quarterback Hits, FR: Fumbles Recovered, FF: Forced Fumbles, BLK: Kicks or Punts Blocked, SAF: Safeties, TD : Touchdown

=== Special teams ===
Kicking statistics
#	NAME	POS	XPM	XPA	XP%	FGM	FGA	FG%	1–19	20–29	30–39	40–49	50+	LNG	PTS	KICKS	YDS	AVG	TB	OB
#32	Jacob Meeker-Hackett	PK	—	—	%	—	—	%	0/0	0/0	0/0	0/0	0/0	—	—	—	—	—	—	—
#33	Tyler Loop	PK	12	12	100%	12	12	100%	0/0	5/5	5/5	2/2	0/0	42	48	—	—	—	—	—
#43	Lucas Havrisik	PK	3	3	100%	9	14	64.3%	0/0	3/3	2/3	2/4	2/4	57	30	—	—	—	—	—
	TOTALS		-	-	%	-	-	%	0/0	0/0	0/0	0/0	0/0	-	-	-	-	-	-	-
	OPPONENTS		—	—	%	—	—	%	0/0	0/0	0/0	0/0	0/0	—	—	—	—	—	—	—

Punting statistics
#	NAME	POS	PUNTS	YDS	AVG	LONG	TB	I–20	50+	BLK
#19	Kyle Ostendorp	P	—	—	—	—	—	—	—	—
	TOTALS		-	-	-	-	-	-	-	-
	OPPONENTS		—	—	—	—	—	—	—	—

Kick return statistics
#	NAME	POS	RTNS	YDS	AVG	TD	LNG
11	Tayvian Cunningham	WR	—	—	—	—	—
	TOTALS		-	-	-	-	-
	OPPONENTS		—	—	—	—	—

Punt return statistics
#	NAME	POS	RTNS	YDS	AVG	TD	LONG
10	Jamarye Joiner	WR	—	—	—	—	—
	TOTALS		-	-	-	-	-
	OPPONENTS		—	—	—	—	—

=== Scoring ===
==== Scores by quarter (non-conference opponents) ====
	1	2	3	4	Total
All opponents	0	0	0	0	0
Arizona	0	0	0	0	0

==== Scores by quarter (Pac-12 opponents) ====
	1	2	3	4	Total
Pac-12 opponents	0	0	0	0	0
Arizona	0	0	0	0	0

==== Scores by quarter (all opponents) ====
	1	2	3	4	Total
All opponents	0	0	0	0	0
Arizona	0	0	0	0	0

== Rankings ==
Ranking movements Legend: — = Not ranked
	Week																
Poll	Pre	1	2	3	4	5	6	7	8	9	10	11	12	13	14	15	Final
AP	—	—	—	—	—	—	—	—	—	—	—	—	—	—			
Coaches	—	—	—	—	—	—	—	—	—	—	—	—	—	—			
CFP	Not released										—	—	—	—			Not released

== After the season ==
=== Awards and honors ===
Weekly awards
Player	Position	Date	Ref.

==== Conference ====
Conference awards
Player	Position	Award	Ref.

==== National ====
Individual Awards
Player	Position	Award	Ref.

==== All-Americans ====
All-American
Player	AP	AFCA	FWAA	TSN	WCFF	Designation
The NCAA recognizes a selection to all five of the AP, AFCA, FWAA, TSN and WCFF first teams for unanimous selections and three of five for consensus selections. HM = Honorable mention. Source:

All-Pac-12
Player	Position	1st/2nd team
HM = Honorable mention. Source:

All-Pac-12 Academic
Player	Position	Class	Major	Ref.
HM = Honorable mention. Source:

=== NFL draft ===
The NFL draft will be held at Allegiant Stadium in Paradise, Nevada on April 28–30, 2022.

Six Arizona Wildcats players who were picked in the 2022 NFL draft:

Round	Pick	Player	Position	NFL team
		Stanley Berryhill	WR	
		Leevel Tatum III	DL	
		Rashie Hodge Jr.	LB	
		Mohamed Diallo	DL	
		Trevon Mason	DL	
		Lucas Havrisik	PK	

==== NFL draft combine ====
No members of the 2021 team were invited to participate in drills at the 2022 NFL Scouting Combine.

2022 NFL combine participants
Name	POS	HT	WT	Arms	Hands	40	Bench press	Vert jump	Broad jump	3-cone drill	20-yd shuttle	60-yd shuttle	Ref

† Top performer

DNP = Did not participate

== Media affiliates ==
=== Radio ===
- ESPN Radio – (ESPN Tucson 1490 AM & 104.09 FM) – Nationwide (Dish Network, Sirius XM, TuneIn radio and iHeartRadio)
- KCUB 1290 AM – Football Radio Show – (Tucson, AZ)
- KHYT – 107.5 FM (Tucson, AZ)
- KTKT 990 AM – La Hora de Los Gatos (Spanish) – (Tucson, AZ)
- KGME 910 AM – (IMG Sports Network) – (Phoenix, AZ)
- KTAN 1420 AM – (Sierra Vista, AZ)
- KDAP 96.5 FM (Douglas, Arizona)
- KWRQ 102.3 FM – (Safford, AZ/Thatcher, AZ)
- KIKO 1340 AM – (Globe, AZ)
- KVWM 970 AM – (Show Low, AZ/Pinetop-Lakeside, AZ)
- XENY 760 – (Nogales, Sonora) (Spanish)

=== TV ===
- CBS Family – KOLD (CBS), CBSN
- ABC/ESPN Family – KGUN (ABC), ABC, ESPN, ESPN2, ESPNU, ESPN+,
- FOX Family – KMSB (FOX), FOX/FS1, FSN
- Pac-12 Network (Pac-12 Arizona)
- NBC – KVOA, NBC Sports, NBCSN
