= Thatcher Unified School District =

School district in Graham County, Arizona

Location
- Thatcher, Arizona United States
- Coordinates: 32°51′02″N 109°45′38″W

District information
- Grades: Pre-K–12
- Schools: 4
- NCES District ID: 0408410

Students and staff
- Students: 1,528 (2011–12)
- Teachers: 79.50 (on FTE basis)
- Student–teacher ratio: 19.22:1

The Thatcher Unified School District serves the town of Thatcher, Arizona. It includes Jack Daley Primary School (grades K–2), Thatcher Elementary School (grades 3–5), Thatcher Middle School (grades 6–8), and Thatcher High School. The middle, elementary, and primary schools are located 3 blocks up 2nd from Reay.

In 2009, Jack Daley Primary School was named a National Blue Ribbon School.
