= Jeremy Nelson =

American visual effects artist

- Born: Thatcher, Arizona
- Occupation: Visual effects artist
- Years active: 2005–present

Jeremy Nelson is an American visual effects artist. He won a Visual Effects Society award in 2011 for best compositing for his work on the HBO mini-series, The Pacific.

Nelson was born in Thatcher, Arizona and attended Thatcher High School and Eastern Arizona College. He has also worked on the motion pictures The Guardian, Clash of the Titans, The Day the Earth Stood Still and Spy and on the television shows Grimm and Bosch as well as several others.
