= 2023 Alamo Bowl =

Postseason college football bowl game

2023 Valero Alamo Bowl
- 31st Alamo Bowl
Arizona Wildcats	Oklahoma Sooners
(9–3)	(10–2)
Pac-12	Big 12
38	24
Head coach: Jedd Fisch	Head coach: Brent Venables
AP / Coaches / CFP; 14 / 14 / 14	AP / Coaches / CFP; 12 / 12 / 12
	1	2	3	4	Total
Arizona	10	3	8	17	38
Oklahoma	0	14	10	0	24
- Date: December 28, 2023
- Season: 2023
- Stadium: Alamodome
- Location: San Antonio, Texas
- MVP: Jacob Cowing (WR, Arizona) & Gunner Maldonado (S, Arizona)
- Favorite: Arizona by 2.5
- Referee: David Smith (SEC)
- Attendance: 55,853

United States TV coverage
- Network: ESPN; ESPN Radio
- Announcers: Tom Hart (play-by-play), Jordan Rodgers (analyst), and Cole Cubelic (sideline) (ESPN); Justin Kutcher (play-by-play), Max Starks (analyst), and Ian Fitzsimmons (sideline) (ESPN Radio)

The 2023 Alamo Bowl was a college football bowl game played on December 28, 2023, at the Alamodome in San Antonio, Texas. The 31st annual Alamo Bowl featured the Oklahoma Sooners from the Big 12 Conference and the Arizona Wildcats from the Pac-12 Conference. The game began at approximately 8:15 p.m. CST and was aired on ESPN. The Alamo Bowl was one of the 2023–24 bowl games concluding the 2023 FBS football season. The bowl was sponsored by Valero Energy and was officially known as the Valero Alamo Bowl.

The 2023 Alamo Bowl was the 6th highest attended bowl game in the 2023-24 bowl season, the highest among the non New Year’s Six bowls and beating the NY6 Fiesta Bowl (mainly due to Oregon being expected to blow out Liberty).

== Teams ==
Consistent with conference tie-ins, the game featured the Oklahoma Sooners from the Big 12 Conference and Arizona Wildcats from the Pac-12 Conference. This was the third meeting between the two teams; entering the game, the series was tied, 1–1. Arizona won their most recent prior matchup, in 1989.

=== Arizona ===
Arizona entered the bowl with a 9–3 record (7–2 in Pac-12), finishing third in their conference. The Wildcats opened the season with three losses in their first six gams, then won their final six games. They entered the bowl ranked 14th in both the AP poll and College Football Playoff rankings.

This was Arizona's second Alamo Bowl; the Wildcats previously lost the 2010 edition.

This was Arizona's final game as a member of the Pac-12, as the Wildcats committed to join the Big 12 for the 2024 season.

=== Oklahoma ===
Oklahoma entered the bowl with 10–2 record (7–2 in Big 12), finishing tied for second in their conference. The Sooners began the season looking to improve on their 2022 season (6-6) and make a return to their conference championship game. Starting the season by winning its slate of non-conference games, Oklahoma continued its success into conference games beating Cincinnati, Iowa State, Texas, and UCF before suffering consecutive loses to Kansas and Oklahoma State. Following those losses, Oklahoma beat West Virginia, BYU, and TCU to finish the season on a three-game winning streak. The loss to Oklahoma State resulted in Oklahoma not being selected to the 2023 Big 12 Championship Game. The Sooners entered the bowl ranked 12th in both the AP poll and College Football Playoff rankings.

This was Oklahoma's second Alamo Bowl; they previously won the 2021 edition.

This was Oklahoma's final game as a member of the Big 12, as the Sooners committed to move to the Southeastern Conference (SEC) for the 2024 season.

== Game summary ==
2023 Valero Alamo Bowl

Quarter	1	2	3	4	Total
No. 14 Arizona	10	3	8	17	38
No. 12 Oklahoma	0	14	10	0	24

at Alamodome • San Antonio, Texas

- Date: Thursday, December 28, 2023
- Game time: 8:15 p.m. CST
- Game weather: N/A (indoor stadium)
- Game attendance: 55,853
- Referee: David Smith
- TV announcers (ESPN): Tom Hart (play-by-play), Jordan Rodgers (analyst), and Cole Cubelic (sideline)
- Box score

Game information

First quarter

- (10:57) ARI – Tyler Loop 39 yard field goal (Drive: 8 plays, 57 yards, 4:03; Arizona 3–0)
- (10:33) ARI – Jacob Cowing 35 yard pass from Noah Fifita, Tyler Loop kick (Drive: 1 plays, 35 yards, 0:08; Arizona 10–0)

Second quarter

- (13:05) ARI – Tyler Loop 38 yard field goal (Drive: 12 plays, 45 yards, 4:24; Arizona 13–0)
- (9:42) OU – Gavin Sawchuk 1-yard run, Zach Schmit kick (Drive: 10 plays, 75 yards, 3:23; Arizona 13–7)
- (2:53) OU – Nic Anderson 10 yard pass from Jackson Arnold, Zach Schmit kick (Drive: 6 plays, 92 yards, 2:39; Oklahoma 14–13)

Third quarter

- (14:29) OU – Brenen Thompson 63 yard pass from Jackson Arnold, Zach Schmit kick (Drive: 2 plays, 75 yards, 0:31; Oklahoma 21–13)
- (6:59) OU – Zach Schmit 22 yard field goal (Drive: 12 plays, 84 yards, 4:12; Oklahoma 24–13)
- (0:02) ARI – Gunner Maldonado 87 yard fumble return, 2-point pass good (Drive: 7 plays, 61 yards, 2:38; Oklahoma 24–21)

Fourth quarter

- (12:49) ARI – Tyler Loop 37 yard field goal (Drive: 4 plays, -9 yards, 2:02; Tied 24–24)
- (5:28) ARI – Jacob Cowing 57 yard pass from Noah Fifita, Tyler Loop kick (Drive: 8 plays, 95 yards, 4:27; Arizona 31–24)
- (2:56) ARI – DJ Williams 19 yard run, Tyler Loop kick (Drive: 2 plays, 19 yards, 0:47; Arizona 38–24)

=== Statistics ===
Statistics	ARZ	OU
First downs	16	23
Plays–yards	64–383	60–562
Rushes–yards	26–29	34–201
Passing yards	354	361
Passing: comp–att–int	24–38–1	26–45–6
Time of possession	31:25	28:35

Team	Category	Player	Statistics
Arizona	Passing	Noah Fifita	24/38, 354 yards, 2 TD, INT
Arizona	Rushing	DJ Williams	6 carries, 27 yards, TD
Arizona	Receiving	Tetairoa McMillan	10 catches, 160 yards
Oklahoma	Passing	Jackson Arnold	26/45, 361 yards, 2 TD, 3 INT
Oklahoma	Rushing	Gavin Sawchuk	15 carries, 134 yards, TD
Oklahoma	Receiving	Brenen Thompson	2 catches, 83 yards, TD
