= Jedd Fisch =

American football coach (born 1976)

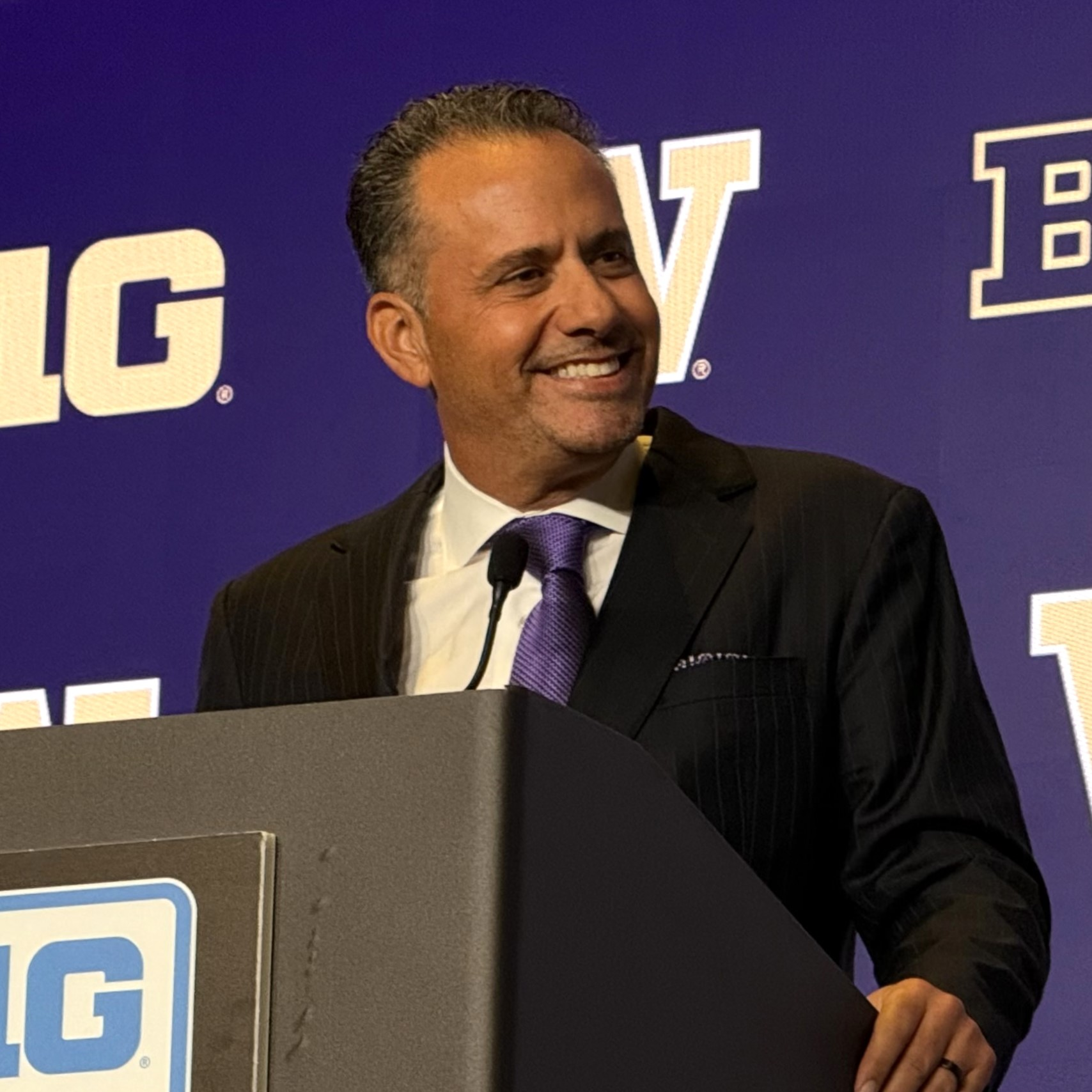
- Fisch at 2026 Big Ten Media Day

Current position
- Title: Head coach
- Team: Washington
- Conference: Big Ten
- Record: 22–15
- Annual salary: $7.75 million

Biographical details
- Born: May 5, 1976 (age 50); Livingston, New Jersey, U.S.
- Education: University of Florida ('98)

Coaching career (HC unless noted)
- 1997: P. K. Yonge Developmental Research School (FL) (DC)
- 1998: New Jersey Red Dogs (WR/QC)
- 1999–2000: Florida (GA)
- 2002–2003: Houston Texans (DQC)
- 2004–2007: Baltimore Ravens (offensive assistant)
- 2008: Denver Broncos (WR)
- 2009: Minnesota (OC/QB)
- 2010: Seattle Seahawks (QB)
- 2011–2012: Miami (FL) (OC/QB)
- 2013–2014: Jacksonville Jaguars (OC)
- 2015–2016: Michigan (QB/WR/PGC)
- 2017: UCLA (OC/QB)
- 2017: UCLA (interim HC)
- 2018: Los Angeles Rams (senior offensive assistant)
- 2019: Los Angeles Rams (assistant OC)
- 2020: New England Patriots (QB)
- 2021–2023: Arizona
- 2024–present: Washington

Head coaching record
- Overall: 39–37
- Bowls: 2–2

Jedd Ari Fisch (born May 5, 1976) is an American football coach, currently the head coach at the University of Washington. He was previously the head coach at the University of Arizona for three seasons.

Prior to his tenure at Arizona, Fisch served as an assistant coach for the New England Patriots, Los Angeles Rams, University of California, Los Angeles (UCLA), University of Michigan, Jacksonville Jaguars, University of Miami, Seattle Seahawks, University of Minnesota, Denver Broncos, Baltimore Ravens, Houston Texans, and the University of Florida.

== Early life ==
Fisch grew up in a Jewish family in Livingston, New Jersey, and attended Hanover Park High School in nearby East Hanover Township. He did not play football at the high school or college level, but was an all-state tennis player during his prep career.

Fisch graduated from the University of Florida in 1998 with a degree in criminology. He attended Florida almost solely for the opportunity to someday work for Gators head coach Steve Spurrier, and was college roommates and fraternity brothers with Philadelphia Eagles general manager Howie Roseman.

== Coaching career ==
=== Early career ===
Fisch embarked on a career in coaching while still in college as an undergraduate student. From 1997 to 1998, Fisch was the defensive coordinator for P. K. Yonge Developmental Research School in Gainesville, and he then spent one year (1998) with the New Jersey Red Dogs of the Arena Football League as a wide receivers/quality control coach.

Fisch got his break in coaching when he was named a graduate assistant coach for the Florida Gators football team under Spurrier from 1999 to 2000. During this time, he earned his master's degree in sports management.

=== NFL assistant coach ===
==== Houston Texans ====
In 2002, Fisch was hired by the Houston Texans as a defensive quality control coach under head coach Dom Capers.

==== Baltimore Ravens ====
In 2004, Fisch was then hired by the Baltimore Ravens under head coach Brian Billick, where he first served as a general offensive assistant for the 2004 season before being named assistant quarterbacks coach and assistant wide receivers coach for the 2005–2007 seasons. Fisch would not be retained under new head coach John Harbaugh.

==== Denver Broncos ====
In 2008, Fisch was hired by the Denver Broncos as their wide receivers coach under head coach Mike Shanahan. Under his tutelage, Brandon Marshall finished the season ranked third among NFL wide receivers in receptions (104), seventh in receiving yards (1,265), fifth in receiving yards per game (84.3), seventh in yards after the catch (419), third in catches that led to first downs (65) and first in number of times targeted for the second consecutive season (181). Marshall also finished first in fan voting for AFC wide receivers in the 2009 Pro Bowl. Rookie second round draft pick Eddie Royal also had a career season in 2008. Royal's 91 receptions are second most in NFL history for a rookie, behind only Anquan Boldin who had 101 receptions in 2003. His 980 yards and five touchdowns are both Broncos rookie records, and sixth in the NFL in total yards. Fisch would not be retained under new head coach Josh McDaniels.

==== Seattle Seahawks ====
In 2010, after spending a year at the University of Minnesota, Fisch was hired by the Seattle Seahawks as their quarterbacks coach under head coach Pete Carroll. Fisch remained with the Seahawks for a season before returning to coach college football at Miami.

==== Jacksonville Jaguars ====
In 2013, Fisch returned to the NFL and was hired by the Jacksonville Jaguars as their offensive coordinator under head coach Gus Bradley. He was terminated from the Jaguars on December 30, 2014.

==== Los Angeles Rams ====
On January 24, 2018, after stints at Michigan and UCLA, Fisch was hired by the Los Angeles Rams as a senior offensive assistant under head coach Sean McVay, adding Fisch to their deep group of offensive coaches. Fisch operated as the Rams' clock-management specialist. Fisch and the Rams appeared in Super Bowl LIII, where they lost to the New England Patriots 13-3 in what was both a rematch of Super Bowl XXXVI and the lowest scoring Super Bowl in NFL history. He was promoted to assistant offensive coordinator for the 2019 season.

==== New England Patriots ====
On January 24, 2020, Fisch was hired by the New England Patriots as their quarterbacks coach under head coach Bill Belichick. Two months after Fisch's arrival, long-time quarterback Tom Brady announced his departure from the Patriots after two decades and would sign with the Tampa Bay Buccaneers on March 20, 2020. In April, it was revealed that Fisch's title would be quarterbacks coach. In his lone season in New England, Fisch coached quarterbacks Cam Newton, Brian Hoyer, and Jarrett Stidham.

=== College assistant coach ===
==== Minnesota ====
In 2009, Fisch returned to the college game, serving a single season as offensive coordinator and quarterbacks coach for the Minnesota Golden Gophers football team under head coach Tim Brewster.

==== Miami ====
In 2011, Fisch joined the Miami Hurricanes football team as their offensive coordinator and quarterbacks coach under head coach Al Golden after a year with the Seattle Seahawks.

==== Michigan ====
On January 9, 2015, Fisch was hired by the Michigan Wolverines to serve as their quarterbacks coach, wide receivers coach, and passing game coordinator. Fisch stated that he was drawn to a job at Michigan despite not having ties to incoming head coach Jim Harbaugh, the University, or the area. However, he does have a long-standing coaching relationship with Vic Fangio, Harbaugh's defensive coordinator for four years with the San Francisco 49ers and one year with Stanford.

==== UCLA ====
On January 5, 2017, Fisch was hired by the UCLA Bruins as the offensive coordinator under sixth-year head coach Jim L. Mora.

Following the firing of Mora, Fisch was named interim head coach on November 19 for the remainder of the 2017 season. With the Bruins at 5–6, he guided them to bowl eligibility with a 30–27 win over the likewise 5–6 California Golden Bears. At the Cactus Bowl in Phoenix on December 26, UCLA was defeated 35–17 by favored Kansas State and finished at 6–7.

=== Head coach ===
==== Arizona ====
On December 23, 2020, Fisch was hired as the 30th head coach at the University of Arizona. At the time, he was believed to be one of a handful of head coaches never to play college football and had spent the previous three seasons as an NFL assistant.

In his third year in 2023, Fisch led the Wildcats to a 9–3 regular season (7–2 in Pac-12, third) and defeated Oklahoma 38–24 in the Alamo Bowl to finish at 10–3 (.769). Arizona was ranked eleventh in the final AP Poll, their highest finish in a quarter century.

==== Washington ====
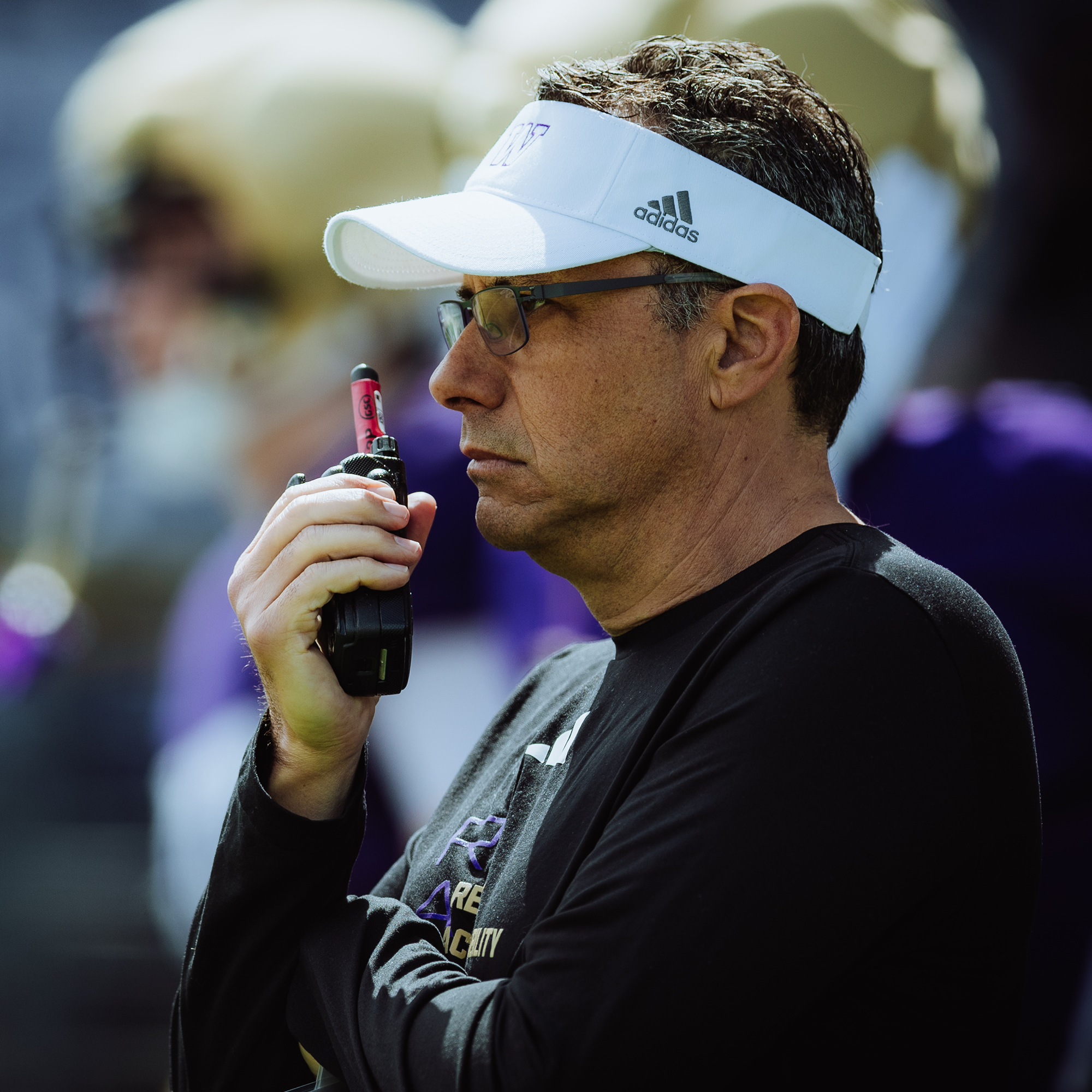
Fisch at UW Spring Ball Practice 2026.

On January 14, 2024, Fisch became the 31st head coach at the University of Washington, accepting a seven-year contract at $7.75 million annually. Fisch left Arizona after three seasons to replace Kalen DeBoer, who left Washington for Alabama.

His first Washington team returned two starters on defense and none on offense. In his first year, the Huskies finished 6-7 and lost the Sun Bowl to Louisville, 34-35. However, that team beat No. 10 Michigan and USC and extended the home winning streak to 20 games, a Husky Stadium record.

In 2025, Washington finished 9-4, and beat No. 23 Illinois, 42-25 on October 25, but lost 13-10 at Wisconsin on November 8, a team that had lost its previous six games. Washington closed the 2025 season with a win over Boise State in the LA Bowl.

In 2026, Washington lost 27-24 at home to Minnesota on September 26, its first home loss to an unranked opponent since 2021.

A week later Washington suffered another loss to USC, their first in LA since 2011, after Jedd Fisch's offense stalled out on multiple second half drives.

== Head coaching record ==
Year	Team	Overall	Conference	Standing	Bowl/playoffs	Coaches^{#}	AP^{°}
UCLA Bruins (Pac-12 Conference) (2017)
2017	UCLA	1–1 (Note: Fisch became interim head coach after Jim L. Mora was fired)	1–0	4th (South)	L Cactus		
UCLA:		1–1	1–0				
Arizona Wildcats (Pac-12 Conference) (2021–2023)
2021	Arizona	1–11	1–8	6th (South)			
2022	Arizona	5–7	3–6	8th			
2023	Arizona	10–3	7–2	3rd	W Alamo	11	11
Arizona:		16–21	11–16				
Washington Huskies (Big Ten Conference) (2024–present)
2024	Washington	6–7	4–5	T–9th	L Sun		
2025	Washington	9–4	5–4	T–7th	W LA		
2026	Washington	7–4	4–4				
Washington:		22–15	13–13				
Total:		39–37					
