= Thatcher High School =

Public high school in Graham County, Arizona

Coordinates: 32.843414°N 109.753765°W

Location
- 601 N. 3rd Avenue; Thatcher, Arizona 85552; United States

Information
- School type: Public high school
- School district: Thatcher Unified School District
- CEEB code: 030440
- Principal: Carol McAtee
- Teaching staff: 30.26 (FTE)
- Grades: 9-12
- Enrollment: 512 (2023–2024)
- Student to teacher ratio: 16.92
- Colors: Kelly green and white
- Mascot: Eagles
- Website: ths.thatcherud.org

Thatcher High School is a high school in Thatcher, Arizona. It is the only high school in the Thatcher Unified School District. Its current building opened in 2000.

== Notable alumni ==
- Elliot Johnson, Current MLB player (Tampa Bay Rays)
