= Gunner Maldonado =

American football player (born 2001)

No. 3 – Kansas State Wildcats
- Position: Safety
- Class: Senior

Personal information
- Born: June 13, 2001 (age 25); Gilbert, Arizona, U.S.
- Listed height: 5 ft 11 in (1.80 m)
- Listed weight: 193 lb (88 kg)

Career information
- High school: Chandler (Chandler, Arizona)
- College: Northwestern (2020); Arizona (2021–2024); Kansas State (2025)

Awards and highlights
- Alamo Bowl Defensive MVP (2023)
- Stats at ESPN

Gunner Maldonado (born June 13, 2001) is an American college football safety for the Kansas State Wildcats. He previously played for the Northwestern Wildcats and the Arizona Wildcats.

== Early life ==
Maldonado attended Chandler High School in Chandler, Arizona, and was rated as a three-star recruit. He committed to play college football for the Northwestern Wildcats over offers from schools such as Arizona, Arizona State, Indiana, and Iowa State.

== College career ==
=== Northwestern ===
Maldonado saw limited playing time as a freshman at Northwestern in 2020, appearing in three games and recording one tackle before entering his name into the NCAA transfer portal after the season.

=== Arizona ===
Maldonado transferred to play for the Arizona Wildcats. In his first season with the Wildcats in 2021, he tallied 36 tackles, two pass deflections, an interception, and a forced fumble. In 2022, Maldonado totaled 48 tackles, a pass deflection, and three forced fumbles. In week eight of the 2023 season, he recorded a team-high ten tackles as he helped the Wildcats to an upset win over Oregon State. During the 2023 Alamo Bowl, Maldonado was named the game's defensive MVP after totaling nine tackles, an interception, two fumble recoveries, and a touchdown, as he helped the Wildcats to a win over Oklahoma. Maldonado finished the season with 81 tackles, a pass deflection, two interceptions, three fumble recoveries, two forced fumbles, and a touchdown.

On December 10, 2024, Maldonado announced that he would enter the transfer portal for the second time.

=== Kansas State ===
On December 23, 2024, Maldonado announced that he would transfer to Kansas State.
