= 2010 Alamo Bowl =

The 2010 Alamo Bowl may refer to:

- 2010 Alamo Bowl (January), January 1, 2010 bowl game between Michigan State University and Texas Tech University
- 2010 Alamo Bowl (December), December 29, 2010 bowl game between Oklahoma State and Arizona
