= Eastern Arizona College =

Community college in Graham County, Arizona

- Former names: St. Joseph Stake Academy (1888 - 1938); Gila Junior College of Graham County (1938 - 1950); Eastern Arizona Junior College (1950 - 1966)
- Type: Community College
- Established: 1888; 138 years ago
- Accreditation: HLC
- President: Todd Haynie
- Students: 5,004 (Fall 2024)
- Location: Thatcher, Arizona, U.S. 32.8419°N 109.7620°W
- Campus: Rural
- Colors: Purple & gold
- Nickname: Gila Monsters
- Mascot: Gila Hank
- Website: www.eac.edu

Eastern Arizona College (EAC), is a community college in Graham County, Arizona, United States. The main campus is in Thatcher, with satellite locations in Gila County and Greenlee County. It is the oldest community college in Arizona and the only one in the state with a marching band.

== History ==
Eastern Arizona College was chartered by the Church of Jesus Christ of Latter-day Saints in 1888. Classes started in a church room in Central, Arizona in 1890 with 17 students and was called the St. Joseph Stake Academy. In 1891, classes were moved to Thatcher, Arizona, to be more centralized and due to room constraints. The school continued to expand, though it was strapped financially. In 1903, land was purchased for a new building, but construction was not able to get underway until 1908. The new 21-room building that finally opened in December 1911 would eventually be known as Old Main.

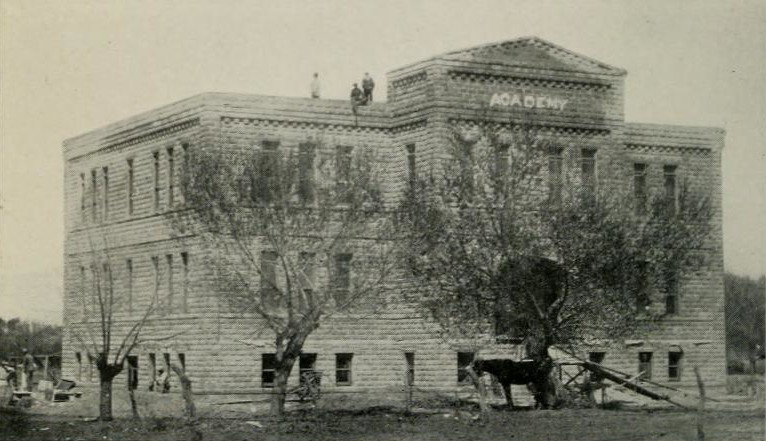
The "Old Main" building around 1921, when the academy was known as Gila Normal College

In 1932, the Church stated they could no longer afford to support the college financially and would close it unless the local valley could support it. In 1933, the residents of Graham County passed an initiative funding the school. The state of Arizona took over the school, changing the name to Gila Junior College of Graham County. This name was changed to Eastern Arizona Junior College in 1950, then simply Eastern Arizona College in 1966. In 1962, it was the inaugural member of Arizona's newly created Junior College system. The 1960s was a time of growth and the college purchased nearby farmland to extend their campus.

In 1972 a fine arts center was completed. In 1979, two fires within one week destroyed Old Main. The building was razed and a new administration building was constructed on the site. During the 1987–88 school year, Eastern Arizona College celebrated its centennial.

Eastern Arizona College has changed names nine times, growing from a one-room school house to becoming a large community college serving three counties and hosting a satellite campus for a university.

In December 2012, after 10 years of lobbying, Eastern Arizona College launched its first bachelor's degree programs in a partnership with Arizona State University. The bachelor's degree programs include nursing and business.

== Ownership ==
EAC is a state-sponsored community college and comes under the guidance and control of the state of Arizona.

== Campus ==
The main campus 32°50′31″N 109°45′43″W sits in the center of the Upper Gila River Valley with Mt. Graham towering to the south and the Gila River to the north. The buildings on the campus are plain, while the grass, trees, and flower beds on EAC's campus are impeccably maintained year-round.

On September 15, 2007, Eastern Arizona College dedicated their Bell Tower. The tower is adjacent to the administration building, between the north and south campuses.

== Housing ==
Eastern Arizona College provides dormitories for single students. EAC has the following houses:

- Mark Allen
- Wesley Taylor
- Nellie Lee
- Residence towers (three towers)

Married student housing is not available on-campus. Most married couples are able to find off-campus apartments.

In addition to on-campus housing, there are many off-campus places available for rent. EAC has a housing office with information for on- and off-campus living.

== Academics ==
Eastern Arizona College has nine academic divisions:

- Business
- Communicative Arts
- Fine Arts
- Health and Physical Education
- Industrial Technology Education
- Liberal Studies
- Mathematics
- Science and Allied Health
- Social Sciences

In addition to the traditional range of associate's degrees and certificates found at community colleges, EAC offers a small number of bachelor's degrees:

- BA in Organizational Leadership (beginning fall 2026)
- BS in Health Sciences
- BS in Music Education

EAC began offering four-year degrees in fall 2024 with their Health Sciences and Music Education programs. Their third four-year degree program in Organizational Leadership is a continuation of an existing two-year program and is set to begin enrolling students in upper division courses in fall 2026, pending accreditation from the Higher Learning Commission.

== Museum ==
Eastern Arizona College is the home of the Mills Collection, the life-work of avocational archaeologists Jack and Vera Mills. The Mills conducted extensive excavations on archaeological sites in Southeastern Arizona and Western New Mexico from the 1940s through the 1970s. They restored numerous pottery vessels and amassed more than 600 whole and restored pots, as well as over 5,000 other artifacts. Most of their work was carried out on private land in southeastern Arizona and western New Mexico. They donated their collection of some 600 whole vessels to EAC, on condition that their collection be placed on permanent public display.

== Mascot ==
The college's mascot is "Gila Hank"—the Gila monster is a species indigenous to the region.

== Notable alumni ==
- H. Verlan Andersen, LDS general authority
- Mike Bellamy, CFL player
- Christo Bilukidi, NFL player
- Del M. Clawson, politician
- Henry Eyring, chemist
- Mark Gastineau, NFL player
- Adarius Glanton, NFL player
- Tay Glover-Wright, NFL player
- Michael Haynes, NFL player
- Mitch Hoopes, NFL player
- Orlando Huff, NFL Player
- Mike James, NBA player
- Walter S. Johnson, businessman and philanthropist
- Spencer W. Kimball, religious leader
- Bronzell Miller, NFL player and actor
- John Mitchell, NFL assistant coach
- Jeremy Nelson, visual effects artist
- Nick Nolte, actor
- Spencer J. Palmer, religious scholar
- Nolan Richardson, college basketball coach
- Seton Sobolewski, college basketball coach
- Brandon Stewart, CFL player
- James Tolkan, actor
- Frank R. Zapata, United States District judge
