= Thatcher, Arizona =

Town in Graham County, Arizona

- Town
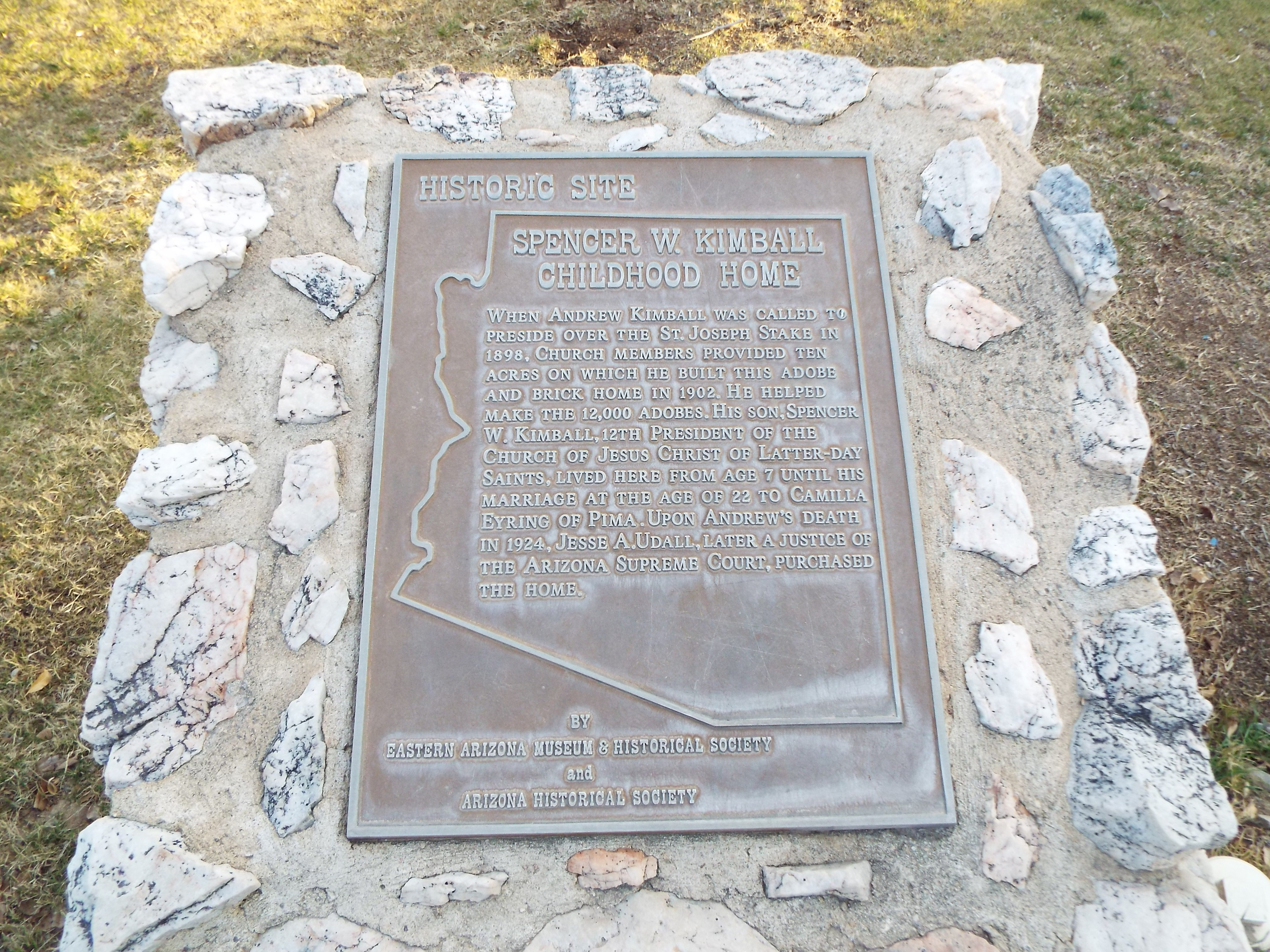
- Spencer W. Kimball Childhood Home Marker

- Flag

- Location of Thatcher in Graham County, Arizona

- Location in the United States
- Coordinates: 32°50′35″N 109°44′56″W
- Country: United States
- State: Arizona
- County: Graham
- Incorporated: 1899

Government
  - Type: Incorporated Town
  - Mayor: Jenny Howard

Area
  - Total: 6.62 sq mi (17.14 km^{2})
  - Land: 6.60 sq mi (17.10 km^{2})
  - Water: 0.015 sq mi (0.04 km^{2})
- Elevation: 2,914 ft (888 m)

Population (2020)
  - Total: 5,231
  - Density: 792.2/sq mi (305.86/km^{2})
- Time zone: UTC-7 (MST (no DST))
- ZIP code: 85552
- Area code: 928
- FIPS code: 04-73420
- GNIS feature ID: 2413382
- Website: Town of Thatcher

Thatcher is a town in Graham County, Arizona, United States. As of the 2020 census, Thatcher had a population of 5,231. It is the home of Eastern Arizona College (EAC).

== History ==
Thatcher was originally settled by members of the Church of Jesus Christ of Latter-day Saints. The first settler was John M. Moody who arrived in Thatcher with his wife and children in 1881. The founding of Thatcher is attributed to Mormon pioneer Christopher Layton, who bought two thousand acres, named the acreage "Thatcher", divided them into lots, and sold those lots to Mormon settlers. Layton also bought a gristmill and built roads, canals and homes.

Eastern Arizona College traces its history to the St. Joseph Stake Academy started by the church in nearby Central. Central is also the location of the Gila Valley Arizona Temple.

== Geography ==
The town is centered in the Upper Gila River Valley with one of Arizona's famous Madrean Sky Islands towering to the south and the Gila River to the north.

According to the United States Census Bureau, the town has a total area of 6.7 square miles (17 km^{2}), including 0.02 square miles (0.052 km^{2}) of water.

== Demographics ==
Historical population
Census	Pop.	Note	%±
1890	320		—
1900	644		101.3%
1910	904		40.4%
1920	899		−0.6%
1930	895		−0.4%
1940	1,106		23.6%
1950	1,284		16.1%
1960	1,581		23.1%
1970	2,320		46.7%
1980	3,374		45.4%
1990	3,763		11.5%
2000	4,022		6.9%
2010	4,865		21.0%
2020	5,231		7.5%
U.S. Decennial Census

Thatcher is part of the Safford Micropolitan Statistical Area.

=== 2020 census ===
As of the 2020 census, Thatcher had a population of 5,231. The median age was 29.7 years. 29.2% of residents were under the age of 18 and 14.6% of residents were 65 years of age or older. For every 100 females there were 97.1 males, and for every 100 females age 18 and over there were 94.4 males age 18 and over.

93.7% of residents lived in urban areas, while 6.3% lived in rural areas.

There were 1,807 households in Thatcher, of which 36.9% had children under the age of 18 living in them. Of all households, 52.2% were married-couple households, 16.2% were households with a male householder and no spouse or partner present, and 26.6% were households with a female householder and no spouse or partner present. About 23.1% of all households were made up of individuals and 9.5% had someone living alone who was 65 years of age or older.

There were 1,965 housing units, of which 8.0% were vacant. The homeowner vacancy rate was 2.2% and the rental vacancy rate was 9.7%.

Racial composition as of the 2020 census
Race	Number	Percent
White	4,298	82.2%
Black or African American	28	0.5%
American Indian and Alaska Native	103	2.0%
Asian	32	0.6%
Native Hawaiian and Other Pacific Islander	1	0.0%
Some other race	281	5.4%
Two or more races	488	9.3%
Hispanic or Latino (of any race)	1,278	24.4%

=== 2000 census ===
As of the 2000 census, there were 4,022 people, 1,281 households, and 927 families residing in the town. The population density was 919.4 inhabitants per square mile (355.0/km^{2}). There were 1,427 housing units at an average density of 326.2 per square mile (125.9/km^{2}). The racial makeup of the town was 84.7% White, 0.8% Black or African American, 1.8% Native American, 0.5% Asian, 0.1% Pacific Islander, 9.9% from other races, and 2.2% from two or more races. 19.5% of the population were Hispanic or Latino of any race.

There were 1,281 households, out of which 36.3% had children under the age of 18 living with them, 59.3% were married couples living together, 9.9% had a female householder with no husband present, and 27.6% were non-families. 19.7% of all households were made up of individuals, and 10.5% had someone living alone who was 65 years of age or older. The average household size was 2.94 and the average family size was 3.37.

In the town, the population was spread out, with 27.6% under the age of 18, 22.8% from 18 to 24, 18.9% from 25 to 44, 18.3% from 45 to 64, and 12.4% who were 65 years of age or older. The median age was 25 years. For every 100 females, there were 87.9 males. For every 100 females age 18 and over, there were 83.5 males.

=== Income and poverty ===
The median income for a household in the town was $32,412, and the median income for a family was $40,392. Males had a median income of $35,815 versus $20,964 for females. The per capita income for the town was $12,961. 17.2% of the population lives below the poverty line.

== Government ==
The Thatcher Police Department (TPD) is the municipal law enforcement agency responsible for policing the town. It has an approximately 10-man uniformed division.

Fire services are provided by the all volunteer Thatcher Fire Department, which has the capability to respond with various types of equipment, including several fire engines and a ladder truck. Mount Graham Regional Medical Center is the medical services provider for the area.

Emergency 911 services are provided by the 24/7 dispatch center of the Graham County Sheriff's Office.

== Transportation ==
San Carlos Apache Nnee Bich'o Nii Transit provides transportation from Thatcher to the San Carlos Apache Indian Reservation, Safford and Globe. Greyhound Lines serves Thatcher on its Phoenix–El Paso via Globe route.

The Arizona Eastern Railway operates rail freight through town on a branch formerly operated by the Southern Pacific. Traffic is primarily copper products on the route between Bowie and Miami, AZ.

== Notable people ==
- Elliot Johnson, professional baseball player MLB.
- Paul Robinson, former professional football player NFL.
- Spencer W. Kimball, former president of the Church of Jesus Christ of Latter-day Saints.
- Don Lancaster, early print on demand and personal computer pioneer, involved in the keyboard design of the Apple I computer.
- Jacque Mercer, Miss Arizona and Miss America, 1949.
- Jess Mortensen, former coach and NCAA-champion track athlete from USC and former world record holder in decathlon.
- Jeremy Nelson, award-winning visual effects artist.
- Frank Wanlass, inventor of CMOS and pioneer in the field of solid-state electronics.

== Gallery ==
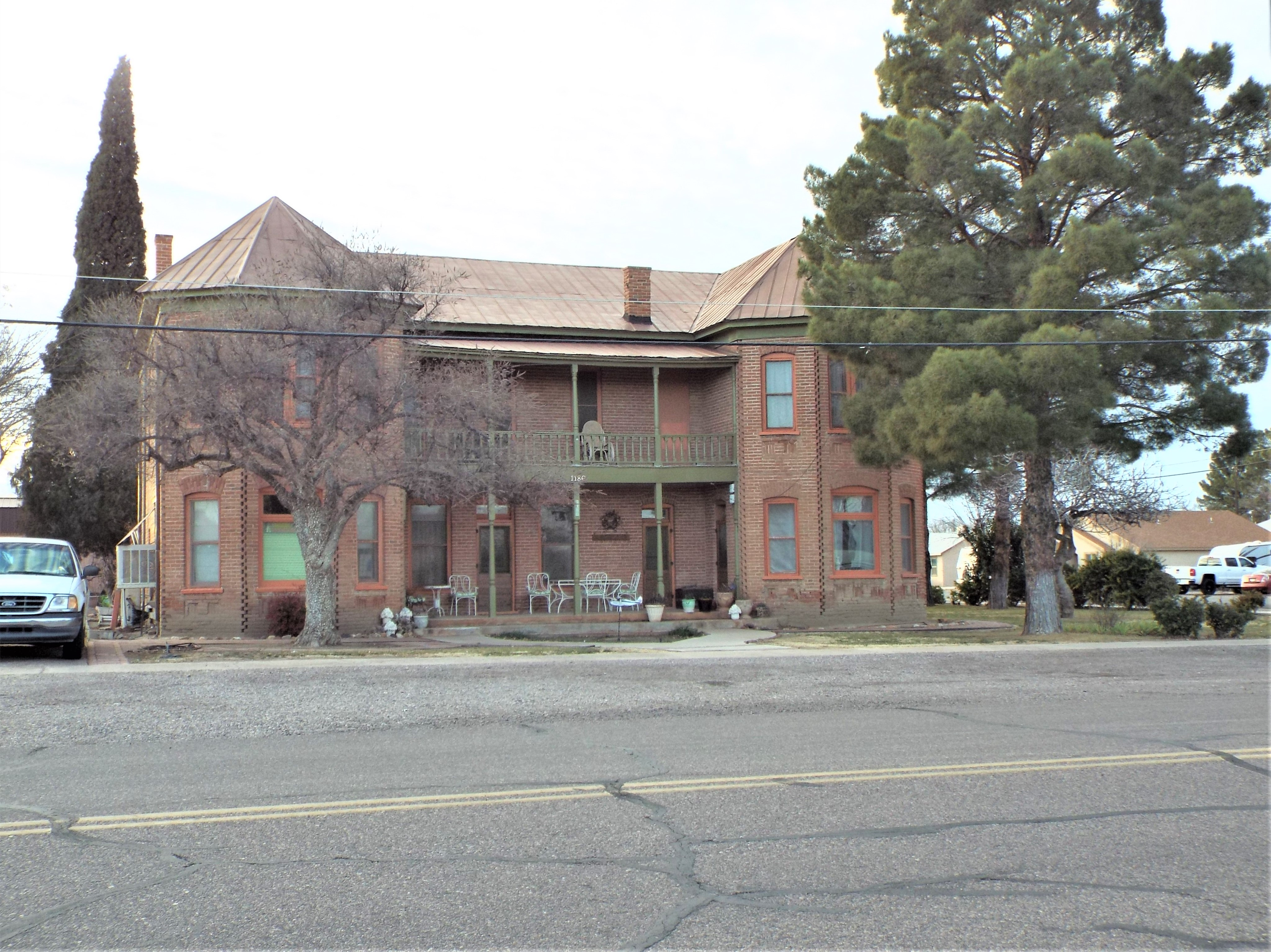
Brinkeroff Hotel – 1900

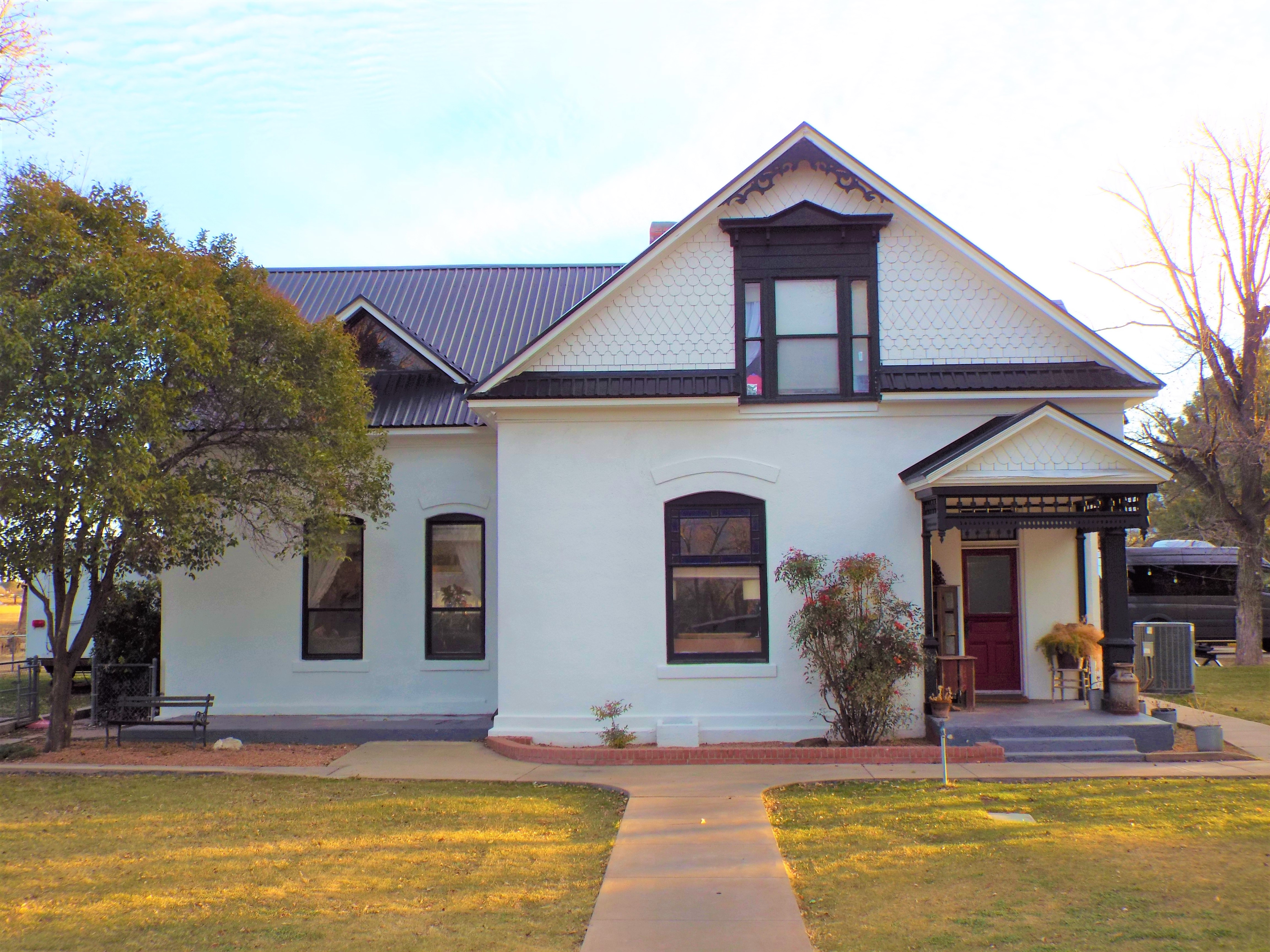
Spencer W. Kimball Childhood Home

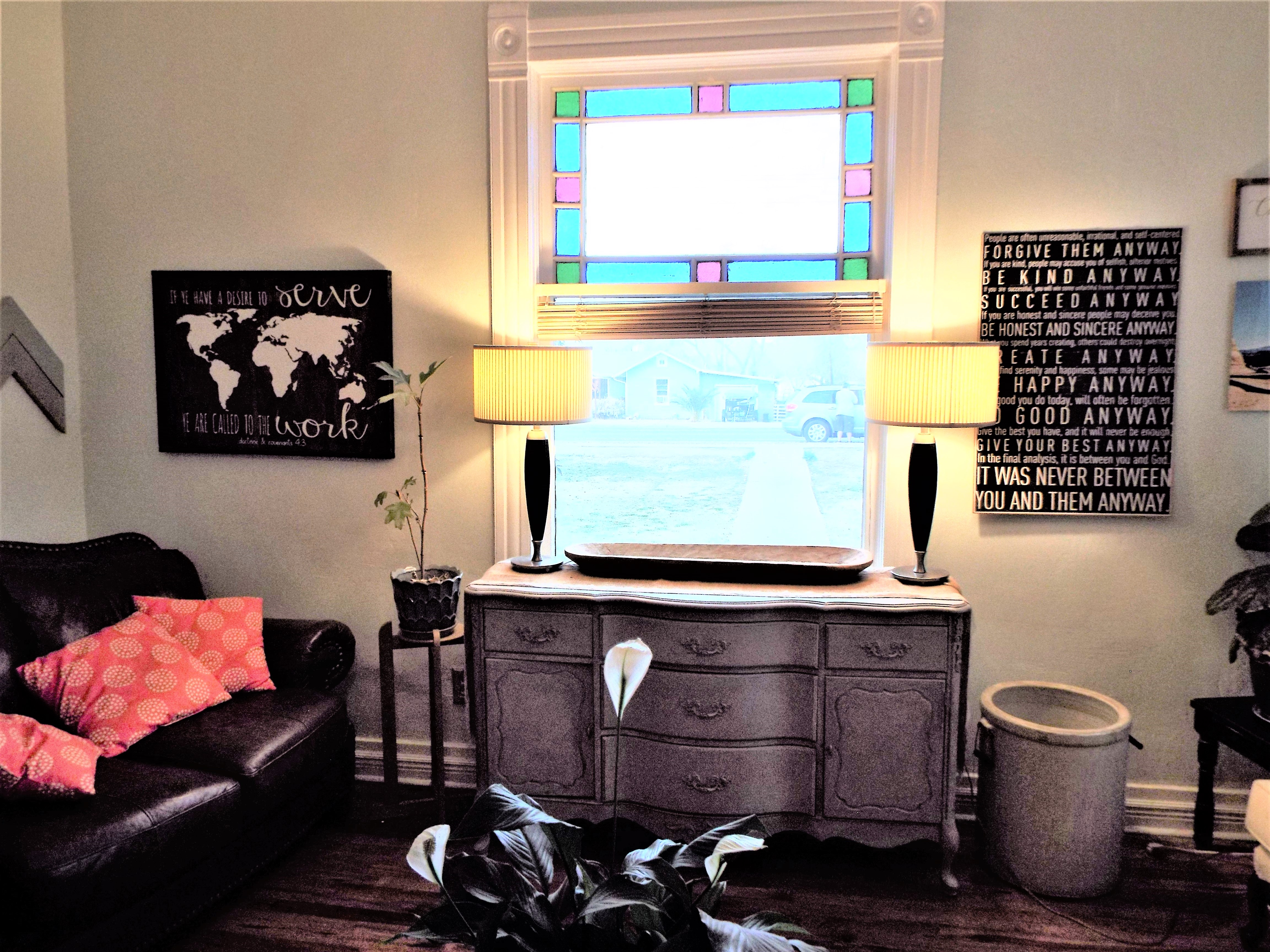
Inside the Spencer W. Kimball Childhood home

== See also ==
- The Church of Jesus Christ of Latter-day Saints in Arizona
