= 2024 Arizona Wildcats football team =

American college football season

2024 Arizona Wildcats football
- Conference: Big 12 Conference
- Record: 4–8 (2–7 Big 12)
- Head coach: Brent Brennan (1st season)
- Offensive coordinator: Dino Babers (1st season)
- Offensive scheme: Veer and shoot
- Defensive coordinator: Duane Akina (1st season)
- Base defense: 4–3
- Captains: Noah Fifita; Josh Baker; Jonah Savaiinaea; Jacob Manu; Gunner Maldonado; Treydan Stukes
- Home stadium: Arizona Stadium

Uniform

2024 Big 12 Conference football standings
	Conf.			Overall
Team	W		L	W		L
No. 7 Arizona State y$^	7	–	2	11	–	3
No. 15 Iowa State y	7	–	2	11	–	3
No. 13 BYU	7	–	2	11	–	2
No. 25 Colorado	7	–	2	9	–	4
Baylor	6	–	3	8	–	5
TCU	6	–	3	9	–	4
Texas Tech	6	–	3	8	–	5
Kansas State	5	–	4	9	–	4
West Virginia	5	–	4	6	–	7
Kansas	4	–	5	5	–	7
Cincinnati	3	–	6	5	–	7
Houston	3	–	6	4	–	8
Utah	2	–	7	5	–	7
UCF	2	–	7	4	–	8
Arizona	2	–	7	4	–	8
Oklahoma State	0	–	9	3	–	9
Championship: Arizona State 45, Iowa State 19
^ – College Football Playoff participant; $ – Conference champion; y – Championship game participant; Rankings from AP Poll

The 2024 Arizona Wildcats football team represented the University of Arizona in the Big 12 Conference during the 2024 NCAA Division I FBS football season. Arizona was led by first-year head coach Brent Brennan, following the departure of Jedd Fisch to Washington. They played at Arizona Stadium in Tucson, Arizona. It was the Wildcats' 125th season overall, and their first year in the Big 12. Despite high regular season expectations off of their previous season, including a #21 ranking in the preseason AP poll, the Wildcats regressed under Brennan, finishing 4–8 overall (2–7 in conference play) and failing to qualify for a bowl game for the sixth time in seven seasons.

== Offseason ==
Positions key
Offense	Defense	Special teams
QB — Quarterback; RB — Running back; FB — Fullback; WR — Wide receiver; TE — Tight end; OL — Offensive lineman; T — Tackle; G — Guard; C — Center	DL — Defensive lineman; DT — Defensive tackle (Note: Includes nose tackle (NT)); DE — Defensive end; EDGE — Edge rusher; LB — Linebacker (Note: Includes middle linebacker (MLB/MIKE), weakside linebacker (WILL), strongside linebacker (SAM), off-ball linebacker, and outside linebacker (OLB)); DB — Defensive back; CB — Cornerback; S — Safety (Note: Includes free safety (FS) and strong safety (SS))	K — Kicker (Note: Also known as a placekicker (PK)); P — Punter; LS — Long snapper; RS — Return specialist (Note: Includes kickoff and punt returners)

== Preseason ==
=== Spring Game ===
The Wildcats were scheduled to hold spring practices on March 26, 2024, with spring game is tentatively scheduled to take place in Tucson, Arizona on April 27, 2024.

=== Big 12 media poll ===
The Big 12 preseason poll was released on July 2, 2024. Arizona was predicted to finish in fifth place in the conference.

=== Preseason Big-12 awards ===
2024 Preseason All Big-12 teams

Offensive

Position	Player	Class
Offense
WR	Tetairoa McMillan	Jr.
OL	Jonah Savaiinaea	Jr.
Special teams
PK	Tyler Loop	Sr.

Defense

Position	Player	Class
Defense
DB	Tacario Davis	Jr.
LB	Jacob Manu	Jr.

=== Preseason All-Americans ===
Pre-season All-American Honors
Player	Position	Designation	AP	Athlon	CBS Sports	CFN	ESPN	PFF	SI	SN	USAT	WCFF
Tetairoa McMillan	Wide Receiver	1st Team Offense; Unanimous	✓	✓	✓	✓	✓	✓	✓	✓	✓	✓
Tacario Davis	Cornerback	1st Team Defense	--	--	--	--	--	--	--	✓	--	--

Other All-Americans teams
Player	Position	Class	Selector(s)
Tacario Davis	Cornerback	Junior	2nd Team Offense (CFN); 3rd Team Defense (Athlon); Honorable Mention (SI)
Jonah Savaiinaea	Offensive Line	Junior	2nd Team Offense (CFN); 4th Team Offense (Athlon)
Jacob Manu	Linebacker	Junior	4th Team Defense (Athlon)

=== Award watch lists ===
Listed in the order that they were released

Award	Player	Position	Year	Source
Lott Trophy	Jacob Manu	LB	Jr.	
Lott Trophy	Tacario Davis	CB	Jr.	
Maxwell Award	Noah Fifita	QB	So.	
Maxwell Award	Tetairoa McMillan	WR	Jr.	
Outland Trophy	Jonah Savaiinaea	OL	Jr.	
Bronko Nagurski Award	Jacob Manu	LB	Jr.	
Bronko Nagurski Award	Tacario Davis	CB	Jr.	
Jim Thorpe Award	Tacario Davis	CB	Jr.	
Wuerffel Trophy	Noah Fifita	QB	So.	
Lou Groza Award	Tyler Loop	PK	Sr.	
Walter Camp Award	Noah Fifita	QB	So.	
Walter Camp Award	Tetairoa McMillan	WR	Jr.	
Doak Walker Award	Jacory Croskey-Merritt	RB	Sr.	
Davey O'Brien Award	Noah Fifita	QB	So.	
Fred Biletnikoff Award	Tetairoa McMillan	WR	Jr.	
Bednarik Award	Tacario Davis	CB	Jr.	
Butkus Award	Jacob Manu	LB	Jr.	
Johnny Unitas Golden Arm Award	Noah Fifita	QB	So.	
Manning Award	Noah Fifita	QB	So.	
Polynesian College Football Player Of The Year Award	Noah Fifita	QB	So.	
Polynesian College Football Player Of The Year Award	Keanu Mailoto	DL	R-Jr.	
Polynesian College Football Player Of The Year Award	Ta'ita'i Uiagalelei	DL	Jr.	
Polynesian College Football Player Of The Year Award	Jacob Manu	LB	Jr.	
Polynesian College Football Player Of The Year Award	Tetairoa McMillan	WR	Jr.	
Polynesian College Football Player Of The Year Award	Jonah Savaiinaea	OL	Jr.	
Polynesian College Football Player Of The Year Award	Stanley Ta'ufo'ou	OL	R-Sr.	
Rotary Lombardi Award	Jacob Manu	LB	Jr.	
Rotary Lombardi Award	Jonah Savaiinaea	OL	Jr.	

== Schedule ==
Date	Time	Opponent	Rank	Site	TV	Result	Attendance
August 31	7:30 p.m.	New Mexico*	No. 21	Arizona Stadium; Tucson, AZ (rivalry)	ESPN	W 61–39	44,748
September 7	7:00 p.m.	Northern Arizona*	No. 20	Arizona Stadium; Tucson, AZ	ESPN+	W 22–10	47,746
September 13	5:00 p.m.	at No. 14 Kansas State (Note: Although both Arizona and Kansas State are in the Big 12, this game will not count in conference standings due to the game being scheduled before Arizona joined the Big 12.)*	No. 20	Bill Snyder Family Football Stadium; Manhattan, KS	FOX	L 7–31	51,290
September 28	7:15 p.m.	at No. 10 Utah		Rice–Eccles Stadium; Salt Lake City, UT	ESPN	W 23–10	52,898
October 5	8:00 p.m.	Texas Tech		Arizona Stadium; Tucson, AZ	FOX	L 22–28	45,773
October 12	1:00 p.m.	at No. 14 BYU		LaVell Edwards Stadium; Provo, UT (Big Noon Kickoff)	FOX	L 19–41	64,420
October 19	1:00 p.m.	Colorado^{†}		Arizona Stadium; Tucson, AZ	FOX	L 7–34	50,724
October 26	4:00 p.m.	West Virginia		Arizona Stadium; Tucson, AZ	FS1	L 26–31	49,888
November 2	12:30 p.m.	at UCF		FBC Mortgage Stadium; Orlando, FL (Space Game)	FS1	L 12–56	42,110
November 15	8:15 p.m.	Houston		Arizona Stadium; Tucson, AZ	FS1	W 27–3	38,538
November 23	1:00 p.m.	at TCU		Amon G. Carter Stadium; Fort Worth, TX	ESPN+	L 28–49	42,977
November 30	1:30 p.m.	No. 16 Arizona State		Arizona Stadium; Tucson, AZ (Territorial Cup)	FOX	L 7–49	49,813
*Non-conference game; ^{†}Homecoming; Rankings from AP Poll (and CFP Rankings, after Week 8) - Released prior to game; All times are in Mountain time

== Games summaries ==
=== vs. New Mexico (rivalry) ===
Uniform Combination
Helmet	Jersey	Pants

New Mexico Lobos (0–1) vs No. 21 Arizona Wildcats (0–0) – Game summary

Quarter	1	2	3	4	Total
Lobos	14	10	7	8	39
No. 21 Wildcats	14	13	21	13	61

at Arizona Stadium • Tucson, AZ

- Date: August 31, 2024
- Game time: 7:30 p.m.
- Game weather: Cloudy, 89 °F (32 °C)
- Game attendance: 44,748
- Referee: Stephen Baron
- TV announcers (ESPN): Brian Custer (play-by-play), Rod Gilmore (analyst), and Lauren Sisler (sideline reporter)

Game information

First quarter

- (11:45) ARIZ – Tetairoa McMillan 69-yard pass from Noah Fifita, Tyler Loop kick (Drive: 3 plays, 98 yards, 1:14; Arizona 7–0)
- (7:23) UNM – Luke Wysong 16-yard pass from Devon Dampier, Luke Drzewiecki kick (Drive: 8 plays, 75 yards, 4:22; Tied 7–7)
- (5:06) ARIZ – Tetairoa McMillan 17-yard pass from Noah Fifita, Tyler Loop kick (Drive: 4 plays, 75 yards, 2:17; Arizona 14–7)
- (7:23) UNM – NaQuari Rogers 6-yard pass from Devon Dampier, Luke Drzewiecki kick (Drive: 8 plays, 75 yards, 4:08; Tied 14–14)

Second quarter

- (12:16) ARIZ – Tyler Loop 54-yard field goal (Drive: 4 plays, 2 yards, 1:00; Arizona 17–14)
- (9:17) UNM – Luke Drzewiecki 20-yard field goal (Drive: 9 plays, 72 yards, 2:59; Tied 17–17)
- (4:51) UNM – Devon Dampier 13-yard run, Luke Drzewiecki kick (Drive: 7 plays, 51 yards, 2:34; New Mexico 24–17)
- (4:21) ARIZ – Tetairoa McMillan 78-yard pass from Noah Fifita, Tyler Loop kick (Drive: 3 plays, 78 yards, 0:24; Tied 24–24)
- (0:30) ARIZ – Tyler Loop 46-yard field goal (Drive: 8 plays, 17 yards, 2:52; Arizona 27–24)

Third quarter

- (13:40) ARIZ – Quali Conley 51-yard run, Tyler Loop kick (Drive: 3 plays, 60 yards, 1:11; Arizona 34–24)
- (12:26) ARIZ – Tetairoa McMillan 40-yard pass from Noah Fifita, Tyler Loop kick (Drive: 1 play, 40 yards, 0:09; Arizona 41–24)
- (8:02) UNM – Devon Dampier 7-yard run, Luke Drzewiecki kick (Drive: 10 plays, 75 yards, 4:24; Arizona 41–31)
- (3:13) ARIZ – Quali Conley 1-yard run, Tyler Loop kick (Drive: 8 plays, 77 yards, 4:43; Arizona 48–31)

Fourth quarter

- (10:18) ARIZ – Quali Conley 23-yard run, Tyler Loop kick (Drive: 11 plays, 86 yards, 4:49; Arizona 55–31)
- (4:44) UNM – Caleb Medford 9-yard pass from Devon Dampier, Devon Dampier two-point pass to Eli Sanders (Drive: 13 plays, 75 yards, 5:34; Arizona 55–39)
- (2:24) ARIZ – Jacory Croskey-Merritt 36-yard run, kick failed (Drive: 4 plays, 48 yards, 2:19; Arizona 61–39)

Statistics	UNM	ARIZ
First downs	30	22
Total yards	471	672
Rushing yards	38–211	26–205
Passing yards	260	422
Passing: Comp–Att–Int	24–42–2	19–31–1
Time of possession	34:58	25:02

Team	Category	Player	Statistics
New Mexico	Passing	Devon Dampier	24/42, 260 yards, 3 TD, 2 INT
New Mexico	Rushing	Devon Dampier	15 carries, 130 yards, 2 TD
New Mexico	Receiving	Luke Wysong	8 receptions, 129 yards, TD
Arizona	Passing	Noah Fifita	19/31, 422 yards, 4 TD, INT
Arizona	Rushing	Jacory Croskey-Merritt	13 carries, 106 yards, TD
Arizona	Receiving	Tetairoa McMillan	10 receptions, 304 yards, 4 TD

=== vs Northern Arizona (FCS) ===
Uniform Combination
Helmet	Jersey	Pants

Northern Arizona Lumberjacks (FCS) (1–0) vs No. 20 Arizona Wildcats (1–0) – Game summary

Quarter	1	2	3	4	Total
Lumberjacks (FCS)	0	10	0	0	10
No. 20 Wildcats	3	3	7	9	22

at Arizona Stadium • Tucson, AZ

- Date: September 7, 2024
- Game time: 7:00 p.m.
- Game weather: Sunny, 92 °F (33 °C)
- Game attendance: 47,746
- Referee: Michael VanderVelde
- TV announcers (ESPN+): Chris Sylvester (play-by-play), Brad Hopkins (analyst), and Shane Sparks (sideline reporter)

Game information

First quarter

- (11:33) ARIZ – Tyler Loop 33-yard field goal (Drive: 6 plays, 69 yards, 3:23; Arizona 3–0)

Second quarter

- (10:24) NAU – Xander Werner 25-yard pass from Isaiah Eastman, Marcus Lye kick (Drive: 10 plays, 83 yards, 4:58; Northern Arizona 7–3)
- (6:20) NAU – Marcus Lye 38-yard field goal (Drive: 6 plays, 42 yards, 2:34; Northern Arizona 10–3)
- (0:32) ARIZ – Tyler Loop 48-yard field goal (Drive: 6 plays, 12 yards, 2:11; Northern Arizona 10–6)

Third quarter

- (12:06) ARIZ – Jeremiah Patterson 17-yard pass from Noah Fifita, Tyler Loop kick (Drive: 3 plays, 34 yards, 1:46; Arizona 13–10)

Fourth quarter

- (11:33) ARIZ – Team safety (Arizona 15–10)
- (9:32) ARIZ – Kedrick Reescano 56-yard run, Tyler Loop kick (Drive: 4 plays, 80 yards, 1:53; Arizona 22–10)

Statistics	NAU	ARIZ
First downs	14	18
Total yards	198	361
Rushing yards	31–89	29–188
Passing yards	109	173
Passing: Comp–Att–Int	15–25–0	18–26–1
Time of possession	27:23	32:37

Team	Category	Player	Statistics
Northern Arizona	Passing	Ty Pennington	14/24, 84 yards
Northern Arizona	Rushing	Seth Cromwell	11 carries, 41 yards
Northern Arizona	Receiving	Xander Werner	1 reception, 25 yards, TD
Arizona	Passing	Noah Fifita	18/26, 173 yards, TD, INT
Arizona	Rushing	Quali Conley	17 carries, 112 yards
Arizona	Receiving	Quali Conley	5 receptions, 38 yards

=== at No. 14 Kansas State ===
Uniform Combination
Helmet	Jersey	Pants

No. 20 Arizona Wildcats (2–0) at No. 14 Kansas State Wildcats (2–0) – Game summary

Quarter	1	2	3	4	Total
No. 20 Arizona	7	0	0	0	7
No. 14 Kansas State	7	7	14	3	31

at Bill Snyder Family Football Stadium • Manhattan, KS

- Date: September 13, 2024
- Game time: 5:00 p.m.
- Game weather: Sunny, 86 °F (30 °C)
- Game attendance: 51,290
- Referee: Kevin Mar
- TV announcers (Fox): Tim Brando (play-by-play), Devin Gardner (analyst), and Josh Sims (sideline reporter)

Game information

First quarter

- (7:26) ARIZ – Quali Conley 1-yard run, Tyler Loop kick (Drive: 14 plays, 73 yards, 7:28; Arizona 7–0)
- (1:01) KSU – Will Swanson 3-yard pass from Avery Johnson, Chris Tennant kick (Drive: 15 plays, 75 yards, 6:25; Tied 7–7)

Second quarter

- (14:37) KSU – Dylan Edwards 71-yard punt return, Chris Tennant kick (Kansas State 14–7)

Third quarter

- (9:29) KSU – Brayden Loftin 9-yard pass from Avery Johnson, Chris Tennant kick (Drive: 6 plays, 86 yards, 2:38; Kansas State 21–7)
- (0:34) KSU – DJ Giddens 1-yard run, Chris Tennant kick (Drive: 11 plays, 83 yards, 5:51; Kansas State 28–7)

Fourth quarter

- (7:04) KSU – Chris Tennant 35-yard field goal (Drive: 7 plays, 46 yards, 4:41; Kansas State 31–7)

Statistics	ARIZ	KSU
First downs	16	21
Total yards	324	391
Rushing yards	19–56	41–235
Passing yards	268	156
Passing: Comp–Att–Int	26–42–1	14–23–0
Time of possession	30:41	29:19

Team	Category	Player	Statistics
Arizona	Passing	Noah Fifita	26/42, 268 yards, INT
Arizona	Rushing	Quali Conley	14 carries, 48 yards, TD
Arizona	Receiving	Tetairoa McMillan	11 receptions, 138 yards
Kansas State	Passing	Avery Johnson	14/23, 156 yards, 2 TD
Kansas State	Rushing	Avery Johnson	17 carries, 110 yards
Kansas State	Receiving	Jayce Brown	3 receptions, 60 yards

=== at No. 10 Utah ===
Uniform Combination
Helmet	Jersey	Pants

Arizona Wildcats (2–1) at No. 10 Utah Utes (4–0) – Game summary

Quarter	1	2	3	4	Total
Wildcats	3	7	6	7	23
No. 10 Utes	0	3	0	7	10

at Rice–Eccles Stadium • Salt Lake City, UT

- Date: September 28, 2024
- Game time: 7:15 p.m.
- Game weather: Sunny, 81 °F (27 °C)
- Game attendance: 52,898
- Referee: David Alvarez
- TV announcers (ESPN): Dave Flemming (play-by-play), Brock Osweiler (analyst), and Stormy Buonantony (sideline reporter)

Game information

First quarter

- (1:48) ARIZ – Tyler Loop 47-yard field goal (Drive: 9 plays, 60 yards, 4:51; Arizona 3–0)

Second quarter

- (6:56) UTAH – Cole Becker 23-yard field goal (Drive: 6 plays, 48 yards, 2:57; Tied 3–3)
- (3:17) ARIZ – Jeremiah Patterson 3-yard pass from Noah Fifita, Tyler Loop kick (Drive: 7 plays, 75 yards, 3:39; Arizona 10–3)

Third quarter

- (7:36) ARIZ – Tyler Loop 53-yard field goal (Drive: 10 plays, 58 yards, 4:34; Arizona 13–3)
- (6:33) ARIZ – Tyler Loop 33-yard field goal (Drive: 4 plays, 3 yards, 0:54; Arizona 16–3)

Fourth quarter

- (11:54) UTAH – Caleb Lohner 20-yard pass from Isaac Wilson, Cole Becker kick (Drive: 6 plays, 80 yards, 2:59; Arizona 16–10)
- (8:13) ARIZ – Keyan Burnett 35-yard pass from Noah Fifita, Tyler Loop kick (Drive: 8 plays, 87 yards, 3:31; Arizona 23–10)

Statistics	ARIZ	UTAH
First downs	17	19
Total yards	358	364
Rushing yards	30–161	29–84
Passing yards	197	280
Passing: Comp–Att–Int	19–31–1	20–40–2
Time of possession	28:05	31:55

Team	Category	Player	Statistics
Arizona	Passing	Noah Fifita	19/31, 197 yards, 2 TD, INT
Arizona	Rushing	Kedrick Reescano	7 carries, 73 yards
Arizona	Receiving	Keyan Burnett	5 receptions, 76 yards, TD
Utah	Passing	Isaac Wilson	20/40, 280 yards, TD, 2 INT
Utah	Rushing	Micah Bernard	16 carries, 91 yards
Utah	Receiving	Dorian Singer	9 receptions, 155 yards

=== vs Texas Tech ===
Uniform Combination
Helmet	Jersey	Pants

Texas Tech Red Raiders (4–1) vs Arizona Wildcats (3–1) – Game summary

Quarter	1	2	3	4	Total
Red Raiders	7	11	0	10	28
Wildcats	3	0	13	6	22

at Arizona Stadium • Tucson, AZ

- Date: October 5, 2024
- Game time: 8:00 p.m.
- Game weather: Sunny, 89 °F (32 °C)
- Game attendance: 45,773
- Referee: Luke Richmond
- TV announcers (Fox): Connor Onion (play-by-play), Mark Helfrich (analyst), and Allison Williams (sideline reporter)

Game information
First quarter
- (5:38) TTU – Tahj Brooks 3-yard run, Gino Garcia kick (Drive: 5 plays, 61 yards, 2:27; Texas Tech 7–0)
- (0:22) ARIZ – Tyler Loop 47-yard field goal (Drive: 11 plays, 46 yards, 5:16; Texas Tech 7–3)

Second quarter

- (1:38) TTU – Tahj Brooks 9-yard run, Johncarlos Miller II run for two-point conversion (Drive: 6 plays, 30 yards, 1:13; Texas Tech 15–3)
- (0:00) TTU – Gino Garcia 30-yard field goal (Drive: 4 plays, 76 yards, 0:40; Texas Tech 18–3)

Third quarter

- (9:29) ARIZ – Tyler Loop 40-yard field goal (Drive: 9 plays, 56 yards, 2:56; Texas Tech 18–6)
- (6:46) ARIZ – Tyler Loop 30-yard field goal (Drive: 7 plays, 20 yards, 2:08; Texas Tech 18–9)
- (1:10) ARIZ – Quali Conley 3-yard run, Tyler Loop kick (Drive: 8 plays, 72 yards, 4:37; Texas Tech 18–16)

Fourth quarter

- (10:07) ARIZ – Tyler Loop 37-yard field goal (Drive: 6 plays, 25 yards, 4:41; Arizona 19–18)
- (2:21) TTU – Gino Garcia 41-yard field goal (Drive: 8 plays, 47 yards, 2:31; Texas Tech 21–19)
- (1:53) TTU – Tahj Brooks 32-yard run, Gino Garcia kick (Drive: 3 plays, 43 yards, 0:19; Texas Tech 28–19)
- (0:54) ARIZ – Tyler Loop 52-yard field goal (Drive: 8 plays, 41 yards, 0:59; Texas Tech 28–22)

Statistics	TTU	ARIZ
First downs	14	25
Total yards	331	442
Rushing yards	29–117	30–121
Passing yards	214	301
Passing: Comp–Att–Int	17–29–0	28–49–2
Time of possession	23:39	36:21

Team	Category	Player	Statistics
Texas Tech	Passing	Behren Morton	17/29, 214 yards
Texas Tech	Rushing	Tahj Brooks	21 carries, 128 yards, 3 TD
Texas Tech	Receiving	Caleb Douglas	5 receptions, 116 yards
Arizona	Passing	Noah Fifita	28/49, 301 yards, 2 INT
Arizona	Rushing	Quali Conley	14 carries, 97 yards, TD
Arizona	Receiving	Tetairoa McMillan	6 receptions, 161 yards

=== at No. 14 BYU ===
Uniform Combination
Helmet	Jersey	Pants

Arizona Wildcats (3–2) at No. 14 BYU Cougars (5–0) – Game summary

Quarter	1	2	3	4	Total
Wildcats	7	0	3	9	19
No. 14 Cougars	0	14	13	14	41

at LaVell Edwards Stadium • Provo, UT

- Date: October 12, 2024
- Game time: 1:00 p.m.
- Game weather: 78 °F (26 °C)
- Game attendance: 64,420
- Referee: Mike McCabe
- TV announcers (Fox): Gus Johnson (play-by-play), Joel Klatt (analyst), and Jenny Taft (sideline reporter)

Game information
First quarter
- (3:27) ARIZ – Montana Lemonious-Craig 14-yard pass from Noah Fifita, Tyler Loop kick (Drive: 11 plays, 95 yards, 4:52; Arizona 7–0)

Second quarter

- (13:30) BYU – Parker Kingston 20-yard pass from Jake Retzlaff, Will Ferrin kick (Drive: 10 plays, 75 yards, 4:57; Arizona 7–7)
- (6:30) BYU – LJ Martin 33-yard pass from Parker Kingston, Will Ferrin kick (Drive: 7 plays, 99 yards, 3:40; BYU 14–7)

Third quarter

- (14:50) BYU – Chase Roberts 9-yard pass from Jake Retzlaff, Will Ferrin kick (Drive: 1 plays, 9 yards, 0:00; BYU 21–7)
- (13:11) BYU – Will Ferrin 33-yard field goal (Drive: 4 plays, 0 yards, 0:57; BYU 24–7)
- (6:12) ARIZ – Tyler Loop 33-yard field goal (Drive: 8 plays, 22 yards, 3:40; BYU 24–10)
- (1:47) BYU – Will Ferrin 39-yard field goal (Drive: 10 plays, 54 yards, 4:25; BYU 27–10)

Fourth quarter

- (9:02) ARIZ – Tyler Loop 21-yard field goal (Drive: 18 plays, 72 yards, 7:45; BYU 27–13)
- (5:38) BYU – LJ Martin 1-yard run, Will Ferrin kick (Drive: 6 plays, 75 yards, 3:24; BYU 34–13)
- (2:58) ARIZ – Quali Conley 2-yard run, two-point attempt failed (Drive: 10 plays, 75 yards, 2:40; BYU 34–19)
- (1:02) BYU – Isaiah Glasker 21-yard interception return, Will Ferrin Kick (Drive: 4 plays, 0 yards, 0:30; BYU 41–19)

Statistics	ARIZ	BYU
First downs	25	22
Total yards	389	398
Rushing yards	114	147
Passing yards	275	251
Passing: Comp–Att–Int	26–52–3	19–33–0
Time of possession	32:39	27:21

Team	Category	Player	Statistics
Arizona	Passing	Noah Fifita	26/52, 275 yards, 1 TD, 3 INT
Arizona	Rushing	Kedrick Reescano	9 carries, 48 yards
Arizona	Receiving	Tetairoa McMillan	5 receptions, 78 yards
BYU	Passing	Jake Retzlaff	18/32, 218 yards, 2 TD
BYU	Rushing	Hinckley Ropati	9 carries, 65 yards
BYU	Receiving	Darius Lassiter	5 receptions, 86 yards

=== vs Colorado ===
Uniform Combination
Helmet	Jersey	Pants

Colorado Buffaloes (4–2) vs Arizona Wildcats (3–3) – Game summary

Quarter	1	2	3	4	Total
Buffaloes	14	14	3	3	34
Wildcats	7	0	0	0	7

at Arizona Stadium • Tucson, AZ

- Date: October 19, 2024
- Game time: 1:00 p.m.
- Game weather: Cloudy, 68 °F (20 °C)
- Game attendance: 50,724
- Referee: Cravonne Barrett
- TV announcers (Fox): Jason Benetti (play-by-play), Brock Huard (analyst), and Allison Williams (sideline)

Game information

First quarter

- (12:37) COLO – Isaiah Augustave 1-yard run, Alejandro Mata kick (Drive: 5 plays, 46 yards, 2:21; Colorado 7–0)
- (6:16) COLO – Drelon Miller 1-yard pass from Shedeur Sanders, Alejandro Mata kick (Drive: 9 plays, 63 yards, 4:52; Colorado 14–0)
- (1:17) ARIZ – Chris Hunter 1-yard pass from Noah Fifita, Tyler Loop kick (Drive: 10 plays, 75 yards, 4:54; Colorado 14–7)

Second quarter

- (13:03) COLO – Will Sheppard 16-yard pass from Shedeur Sanders, Alejandro Mata kick (Drive: 11 plays, 75 yards, 3:14; Colorado 21–7)
- (1:07) COLO – Shedeur Sanders 6-yard run, Alejandro Mata kick (Drive: 7 plays, 31 yards, 1:36; Colorado 28–7)

Third quarter

- (5:58) COLO – Alejandro Mata 28-yard field goal (Drive: 9 plays, 76 yards, 4:04; Colorado 31–7)

Fourth quarter

- (4:42) COLO – Alejandro Mata 34-yard field goal (Drive: 4 plays, 7 yards, 1:42; Colorado 34–7)

Statistics	COLO	ARIZ
First downs	21	16
Total yards	398	245
Rushing yards	39–148	34–107
Passing yards	250	138
Passing: Comp–Att–Int	23–34–2	16–26–1
Time of possession	30:34	29:26

Team	Category	Player	Statistics
Colorado	Passing	Shedeur Sanders	23/33, 250 yards, 2 TD, 2 INT
Colorado	Rushing	Isaiah Augustave	14 carries, 53 yards, TD
Colorado	Receiving	LaJohntay Wester	8 receptions, 127 yards
Arizona	Passing	Noah Fifita	16/26, 138 yards, TD, INT
Arizona	Rushing	Quali Conley	11 carries, 42 yards
Arizona	Receiving	Tetairoa McMillan	5 receptions, 38 yards

=== vs West Virginia ===
Uniform Combination
Helmet	Jersey	Pants

West Virginia Mountaineers (3–4) vs Arizona Wildcats (3–4) – Game summary

Quarter	1	2	3	4	Total
Mountaineers	10	7	7	7	31
Wildcats	0	7	6	13	26

at Arizona Stadium • Tucson, AZ

- Date: October 26, 2024
- Game time: 4:00 p.m.
- Game weather: Sunny, 97 °F (36 °C)
- Game attendance: 49,888
- Referee: Kevin Mar
- TV announcers (FS1): Alex Faust (play-by-play) and Robert Smith (analyst)

Game information

First quarter

- (8:09) WVU – Michael Hayes II 45-yard field goal (Drive: 12 plays, 48 yards, 6:51; West Virginia 3–0)
- (0:31) WVU – Leighton Bechdel 14-yard run, Michael Hayes II kick (Drive: 10 plays, 81 yards, 5:51; West Virginia 10–0)

Second quarter

- (7:34) ARIZ – Quali Conley 1-yard run, Tyler Loop kick (Drive: 14 plays, 75 yards, 7:57; West Virginia 10–7)
- (2:55) WVU – Hudson Clement 3-yard pass from Nicco Marchiol, Michael Hayes II kick (Drive: 8 plays, 75 yards, 4:39; West Virginia 17–7)

Third quarter

- (7:59) WVU – CJ Donaldson Jr. 20-yard run, Michael Hayes II kick (Drive: 8 plays, 44 yards, 4:54; West Virginia 24–7)
- (1:18) ARIZ – Sam Olson 23-yard pass from Noah Fifita, kick failed (Drive: 6 plays, 65 yards, 2:24; West Virginia 24–13)

Fourth quarter

- (13:31) WVU – Traylon Ray 54-yard pass from Nicco Marchiol, Michael Hayes II kick (Drive: 5 plays, 75 yards, 2:47; West Virginia 31–13)
- (8:52) ARIZ – Tetairoa McMillan 34-yard pass from Noah Fifita, two-point pass failed (Drive: 13 plays, 75 yards, 4:39; West Virginia 31–19)
- (4:35) ARIZ – Noah Fifita 3-yard run, Tyler Loop kick (Drive: 6 plays, 71 yards, 1:27; West Virginia 31–26)

Statistics	WVU	ARIZ
First downs	16	18
Total yards	401	386
Rushing yards	40–203	25–78
Passing yards	198	308
Passing: Comp–Att–Int	18–22–0	22–34–0
Time of possession	35:04	24:56

Team	Category	Player	Statistics
West Virginia	Passing	Nicco Marchiol	18/22, 198 yards, 2 TD
West Virginia	Rushing	Jahiem White	12 carries, 92 yards
West Virginia	Receiving	Traylon Ray	2 receptions, 78 yards, TD
Arizona	Passing	Noah Fifita	21/32, 294 yards, 2 TD
Arizona	Rushing	Quali Conley	16 carries, 72 yards, TD
Arizona	Receiving	Tetairoa McMillan	10 receptions, 202 yards, TD

=== at UCF ===
Uniform Combination
Helmet	Jersey	Pants

Arizona Wildcats (3–5) at UCF Knights (3–5) – Game summary

Quarter	1	2	3	4	Total
Wildcats	0	6	6	0	12
Knights	14	21	14	7	56

at FBC Mortgage Stadium • Orlando, FL

- Date: November 2, 2024
- Game time: 12:30 p.m.
- Game weather: 86 °F (30 °C)
- Game attendance: 42,110
- Referee: Tutashinda Salaam
- TV announcers (FS1): Dan Hellie (play-by-play) and Robert Smith (analyst)

Game information

First quarter

- (3:58) UCF – Jacurri Brown 4-yard run, Grant Reddick kick (Drive: 11 plays, 80 yards, 4:54; UCF 7–0)
- (3:38) UCF – RJ Harvey 17-yard run, Grant Reddick kick (Drive: 1 play, 17 yards, 0:04; UCF 14–0)

Second quarter

- (10:34) UCF – RJ Harvey 18-yard run, Grant Reddick kick (Drive: 12 plays, 99 yards, 5:17; UCF 21–0)
- (3:39) UCF – Myles Montgomery 5-yard run, Grant Reddick kick (Drive: 8 plays, 88 yards, 4:13; UCF 28–0)
- (0:46) ARIZ – Sam Olson 23-yard pass from Noah Fifita, Tyler Loop PAT failed (Drive: 10 plays, 78 yards, 2:46; UCF 28–6)
- (0:00) UCF – Randy Pittman Jr. 48-yard pass from Dylan Rizk, Grant Reddick kick (Drive: 5 plays, 75 yards, 0:46; UCF 35–6)

Third quarter

- (10:01) UCF – RJ Harvey 19-yard run, Grant Reddick kick (Drive: 5 plays, 76 yards, 2:35; UCF 42–6)
- (8:02) ARIZ – Tetairoa McMillan 2-yard pass from Noah Fifita, Two-point pass conversion failed (Drive: 6 plays, 60 yards, 1:55; UCF 42–12)
- (6:49) UCF – Jacoby Jones 40-yard pass from Dylan Rizk, Grant Reddick kick (Drive: 4 plays, 75 yards, 1:13; UCF 49–12)

Fourth quarter

- (1:56) UCF – Randy Pittman Jr. 1-yard pass from Dylan Rizk, Grant Reddick kick (Drive: 8 plays, 57 yards, 4:34; UCF 56–12)

Statistics	ARIZ	UCF
First downs	14	33
Total yards	261	602
Rushing yards	5	308
Passing yards	256	294
Passing: Comp–Att–Int	24–33–0	20–25–0
Time of possession	28:39	31:21

Team	Category	Player	Statistics
Arizona	Passing	Noah Fifita	24/33, 256 yards, 2 TD
Arizona	Rushing	Kedrick Reescano	8 carries, 20 yards
Arizona	Receiving	Chris Hunter	7 receptions, 102 yards
UCF	Passing	Dylan Rizk	20/25, 294 yards, 3 TD
UCF	Rushing	RJ Harvey	22 carries, 184 yards, 3 TD
UCF	Receiving	Jacoby Jones	5 receptions, 108 yards, TD

=== vs Houston ===
Uniform Combination
Helmet	Jersey	Pants

Houston Cougars (4–5) vs Arizona Wildcats (3–6) – Game summary

Quarter	1	2	3	4	Total
Cougars	0	3	0	0	3
Wildcats	7	3	17	0	27

at Arizona Stadium • Tucson, AZ

- Date: November 15, 2024
- Game time: 8:15 p.m.
- Game weather: Clear, 58 °F (14 °C)
- Game attendance: 38,538
- Referee: Mike McCabe
- TV announcers (FS1): Trent Rush (play-by-play) and Petros Papadakis (analyst)

Game information

First quarter

- (8:28) ARIZ – Tetairoa McMillan 33-yard pass from Noah Fifita, Tyler Loop kick (Drive: 7 plays, 60 yards, 2:51; Arizona 7–0)

Second quarter

- (0:42) HOU – Jack Martin 49-yard field goal (Drive: 7 plays, 49 yards, 3:06; Arizona 7–3)
- (0:00) ARIZ – Tyler Loop 62-yard field goal (Drive: 6 plays, 31 yards, 0:42; Arizona 10–3)

Third quarter

- (10:01) ARIZ – Quali Conley 13-yard pass from Noah Fifita, Tyler Loop kick (Drive: 10 plays, 70 yards, 3:41; Arizona 17–3)
- (6:15) ARIZ – Tyler Loop 51-yard field goal (Drive: 5 plays, 16 yards, 1:47; Arizona 20–3)
- (4:27) ARIZ – Quali Conley 50-yard run, Tyler Loop kick (Drive: 1 play, 50 yards, 0:10; Arizona 27–3)

Fourth quarter

No scoring plays

Statistics	HOU	ARIZ
First downs	14	20
Total yards	326	337
Rushing yards	34–135	36–113
Passing yards	191	224
Passing: Comp–Att–Int	16–28–1	20–35–1
Time of possession	28:56	31:04

Team	Category	Player	Statistics
Houston	Passing	Zeon Chriss	16/27, 191 yards, INT
Houston	Rushing	Re'Shaun Sanford II	10 carries, 76 yards
Houston	Receiving	Stephon Johnson	4 receptions, 70 yards
Arizona	Passing	Noah Fifita	20/35, 224 yards, 2 TD, INT
Arizona	Rushing	Quali Conley	11 carries, 107 yards, TD
Arizona	Receiving	Tetairoa McMillan	6 receptions, 70 yards, TD

=== at TCU ===
Uniform Combination
Helmet	Jersey	Pants

Arizona Wildcats (4–6) at TCU Horned Frogs (6–4) – Game summary

Quarter	1	2	3	4	Total
Wildcats	7	6	0	15	28
Horned Frogs	14	7	14	14	49

at Amon G. Carter Stadium • Fort Worth, TX

- Date: November 23, 2024
- Game time: 1:00 p.m.
- Game weather: Sunny • Temperature: 73 °F (23 °C) • Wind: S 15 miles per hour (24 km/h)
- Game attendance: 42,977
- Referee: Cravonne Barrett
- TV announcers (ESPN+): Richard Cross (play-by-play) and Barrett Brooks (analyst)

Game information

First quarter

- (12:48) TCU – Trent Battle 4-yard run, Kyle Lemmermann kick (Drive: 5 plays, 37 yards, 2:06; TCU 7–0)
- (2:10) TCU – Savion Williams 1-yard run, Kyle Lemmermann kick (Drive: 5 plays, 61 yards, 2:58; TCU 14–0)
- (0:16) ARI – Chris Hunter 17-yard pass from Noah Fifita, Tyler Loop kick (Drive: 6 plays, 75 yards, 1:54; TCU 14–7)

Second quarter

- (8:08) ARI – Tyler Loop 53-yard field goal (Drive: 12 plays, 46 yards, 6:06; TCU 14–10)
- (1:55) ARI – Tyler Loop 43-yard field goal (Drive: 10 plays, 39 yards, 5:05; TCU 14–13)
- (0:13) TCU – Savion Williams 20-yard run, Kyle Lemmermann kick (Drive: 12 plays, 75 yards, 1:42; TCU 21–13)

Third quarter

- (10:13) TCU – Trent Battle 1-yard run, Kyle Lemmermann kick (Drive: 9 plays, 76 yards, 4:47; TCU 28–13)
- (7:51) TCU – JP Richardson 38-yard pass from Josh Hoover, Kyle Lemmermann kick (Drive: 2 plays, 34 yards, 0:51; TCU 35–13)

Fourth quarter

- (14:53) ARI – Chris Hunter 3-yard pass from Noah Fifita, Jeremiah Patterson pass (Drive: 15 plays, 75 yards, 7:58; TCU 35–21)
- (10:23) TCU – Cam Cook 6-yard run, Kyle Lemmermann kick (Drive: 9 plays, 75 yards, 4:30; TCU 42–21)
- (5:25) TCU – Jeremy Payne 30-yard run, Kyle Lemmermann kick (Drive: 5 plays, 68 yards, 2:31; TCU 49–21)
- (1:00) ARI – Sterling Lane II 70-yard fumble recovery, Tyler Loop kick (TCU 49–28)

Statistics	ARIZ	TCU
First downs	16	24
Total yards	325	450
Rushing yards	38	147
Passing yards	287	303
Passing: Comp–Att–Int	30–47–1	21–29–1
Time of possession	31:28	28:32

Team	Category	Player	Statistics
Arizona	Passing	Noah Fifita	29/44, 284 yards, 2 TD, INT
Arizona	Rushing	Quali Conley	13 carries, 42 yards
Arizona	Receiving	Tetairoa McMillan	9 receptions, 115 yards
TCU	Passing	Josh Hoover	19/26, 252 yards, TD, INT
TCU	Rushing	Savion Williams	9 carries, 80 yards, 2 TD
TCU	Receiving	JP Richardson	6 receptions, 107 yards, TD

=== vs No. 16 Arizona State (rivalry) ===
Uniform Combination
Helmet	Jersey	Pants

No. 16 Arizona State Sun Devils (9–2) vs Arizona Wildcats (4–7) – Game summary

Quarter	1	2	3	4	Total
No. 16 Sun Devils	14	21	0	14	49
Wildcats	0	0	7	0	7

at Arizona Stadium • Tucson, AZ

- Date: November 30, 2024
- Game time: 1:30 p.m.
- Game weather: 76 °F (24 °C)
- Game attendance: 49,813
- Referee: Luke Richmond
- TV announcers (FOX): Jason Benetti (play-by-play), Brock Huard (analyst), and Allison Williams (sideline reporter)

Game information

First quarter

- (9:32) ASU – Cam Skattebo 2-yard run, Parker Lewis kick (Drive: 9 plays, 75 yards, 5:28; ASU 7–0)
- (9:32) ASU – Cam Skattebo 2-yard run, Parker Lewis kick (Drive: 5 plays, 73 yards, 2:17; ASU 14–0)

Second quarter

- (13:29) ASU – Jordyn Tyson 13-yard pass from Sam Leavitt, Parker Lewis kick (Drive: 6 plays, 80 yards, 3:08; ASU 21–0)
- (6:28) ASU – Cam Skattebo 3-yard run, Parker Lewis kick (Drive: 11 plays, 63 yards, 6:00; ASU 28–0)
- (0:41) ASU – Chamon Metayer 22-yard pass from Sam Leavitt, Parker Lewis kick (Drive: 5 plays, 70 yards, 0:46; ASU 35–0)

Third quarter

- (10:53) ARI – Tetairoa McMillan 28-yard pass from Noah Fifita, Tyler Loop kick (Drive: 8 plays, 75 yards, 4:07; ASU 35–7)

Fourth quarter

- (14:55) ASU – Xavier Guillory 31-yard pass from Sam Leavitt, Parker Lewis kick (Drive: 9 plays, 81 yards, 4:33; ASU 42–7)
- (10:56) ASU – Derek Eusebio 64-yard pass from Trenton Bourguet, Parker Lewis kick (Drive: 3 plays, 75 yards, 1:33; ASU 49–7)

Statistics	ASU	ARIZ
First downs	24	15
Total yards	643	210
Rushing yards	281	84
Passing yards	362	126
Passing: Comp–Att–Int	19–25–0	14–31–1
Time of possession	33:57	26:03

Team	Category	Player	Statistics
Arizona State	Passing	Sam Leavitt	17/22, 291 yards, 3 TD
Arizona State	Rushing	Cam Skattebo	21 carries, 177 yards, 3 TD
Arizona State	Receiving	Jordyn Tyson	8 receptions, 143 yards, TD
Arizona	Passing	Noah Fifita	14/29 126 yards, TD
Arizona	Rushing	Keedrick Reescano	11 carries, 55 yards
Arizona	Receiving	Tetairoa McMillan	6 receptions, 68 yards, TD

== Personnel ==
=== Roster and coaching staff ===
2024 Arizona Wildcats football team roster
Players
Coaches
Offense

Pos.	#	Name	Class
WR	0	Reymello Murphy	So
RB	1	Jacory Croskey-Merritt	GS
WR	2	Jeremiah Patterson	So
RB	3	Kedrick Reescano	Fr
WR	4	Tetairoa McMillan	Jr
WR	5	Montana Lemonious-Craig	Sr
WR	6	A.J. Jones	So
RB	7	Quali Conley	Sr
QB	8	Anthony Garcia	Fr
WR	9	Jackson Holman	Fr
WR	10	Malachi Riley	So
QB	11	Noah Fifita (C)	So
QB	12	Cole Tannenbaum	So
WR	13	Devin Hyatt	Fr
QB	14	Mason Bray	Fr
WR	14	Rex Haynes	So
WR	15	Jaden Clark	Jr
QB	15	Adam Domante	So
WR	16	Chris Hunter	So
QB	17	Brayden Dorman	Fr
WR	18	Brandon Phelps	Fr
RB	20	Brandon Johnson	Fr
RB	21	Rayshon Luke	Jr
RB	28	Anthony Wilhite	So
RB	30	Kayden Luke	Fr
OL	50	Shannco Matautia	Jr
OL	53	Joey Capra	Sr
OL	55	J.T. Hand	Jr
OL	56	Tylen Gonzalez	So
OL	58	Ryan Stewart	Jr
OL	59	Rhino Tapa'atoutai	So
OL	60	Alexander Doost	Fr
OL	63	Elijha Payne	Fr
OL	65	Leif Magnuson	Jr
OL	70	Zarius Wells	Fr
OL	71	Jonah Savaiinaea (C)	Jr
OL	72	Wendell Moe	So
OL	73	Matthew Lado	Fr
OL	75	Josh Baker (C)	Sr
OL	76	Jonah Rodriguez	Fr
OL	77	Michael Wooten	Fr
OL	78	Grayson Stovall	So
OL	79	Raymond Pulido	So
TE	80	Dylan Tapley	Fr
WR	81	Julius Oliver	Fr
TE	82	Dorian Thomas	Fr
WR	83	Sam Graci-Glazer	So
TE	84	Sam Olson	Jr
TE	85	Roberto Miranda	Jr
TE	86	John Hart	So
TE	87	Tyler Powell	So
TE	88	Keyan Burnett	Jr
WR	89	Jordan McCord	Fr

Defense

Pos.	#	Name	Class
LB	0	Justin Flowe	Jr
CB	1	Tacario Davis	Jr
CB	2	Treydan Stukes (C)	Sr
DL	3	Tre Smith	Jr
LB	5	Jacob Manu (C)	Jr
LB	6	Taye Brown	So
DB	7	Demetrius Freeney	Sr
LB	8	Sterling Lane II	So
S	9	Gunner Maldonado (C)	Sr
DB	10	Quinn Olson	Fr
DE	11	Chase Kennedy	Fr
S	12	Genesis Smith	So
S	13	Jack Luttrell	Fr
LB	14	Stacy Bey	Fr
LB	15	Jabari Mann	Fr
S	16	Gavin Hunter	So
LB	18	Kamuela Ka'aihue	So
CB	19	Marquis Groves-Killebrew	So
DB	21	Johno Price	So
CB	23	Emmanuel Karnley	Fr
CB	24	Jai-Ayviauynn Celestine	So
DB	25	Arian Parish	So
DB	27	Owen Goss	GS
CB	29	Devin Dunn	Fr
DB	32	Nela Taliauli	Fr
DL	34	Ammon Kaufusi	So
DB	35	C. J. Flores	So
LB	36	Dominic Hanger	So
DE	37	Nolan Clement	So
LB	40	Jared Small	GS
DL	41	Julian Savaiinaea	Fr
DE	42	Dominic Lolesio	So
S	43	Dalton Johnson	Jr
DL	44	Jarra Anderson	So
DL	45	Kevon Darton	Sr
DL	46	Ta'ita'i Uiagalelei	Jr
DB	47	Stanley Ta’ufo’ou	GS
LB	51	Tyler Mustain	So
LB	52	Brandon Craddock	So
DE	53	Christian Madoski	Fr
DL	54	Chase Randall	Jr
LB	55	Leviticus Su'a	Fr
DL	56	Bryce Echols	Fr
DE	90	Lance Keneley	GS
DL	91	Isaiah Johnson	So
DL	92	Chubba Ma'ae	Sr
DE	94	Edukwa Okundaye	Fr
DL	95	Keanu Mailoto	Jr
DL	96	Nick Fernandez	So
DE	97	Tristan Davis	Fr
DL	99	Cyrus Durham	So

Special teams

Pos.	#	Name	Class
PK	19	Michael Salgado-Medina	Fr
LS	31	Justin Holloway	GS
P	32	Cash Peterman	Jr
PK	33	Tyler Loop	Sr
P	49	Jordan Forbes	So
LS	52	Trey Naughton	So
P	96	Lachlan Bruce	Jr

Head coach

- Brent Brennan

Coordinators/assistant coaches

- Dino Babers – Offensive coordinator
- Duane Akina – Defensive coordinator
- Alonzo Carter – Running backs
- Josh Oglesby – offensive linemen/Run game coordinator
- Matt Adkins – Tight Ends/Pass game coordinator
- Joe Seumalo – Defensive linemen
- Danny Gonzales – Special teams coordinator/Linebackers
- Bobby Wade – Wide receivers
- Chip Viney – Cornerbacks
- Brett Arce – Stars Coach

Legend

- (C) Team captain
- (S) Suspended
- (I) Ineligible
- Injured
- Redshirt

Roster
Last update: 08/29/2024

=== Depth chart ===
Defense
4-3

FS
Dalton Johnson
Owen Goss
Gavin Hunter

WILL	MIKE	SAM
Taye Brown	Jacob Manu	Treydan Stukes
Jared Small	Kamuela Ka’aihue	Genesis Smith
-	Justin Flowe	-

SS
Gunner Maldonado
Jack Luttrell
Genesis Smith

CB
Tacario Davis
Emmanuel Karnley
-

DE	DT	DT	DE
Ta’ita’i Uiagalelei; Sterling Lane II	Isaiah Johnson	Tre Smith	Stanley Ta’ufo’ou; Kevon Darton
Chase Kennedy	Chubba Ma’ae	Dominic Lolesio	Jarra Anderson
Eduwa Okundaye	Keanu Mailoto	Cyrus Durham	Julian Savaiinaea

CB
Marquis Groves-Killebrew
Demetrius Freeney
Jai-Ayuviann Celestine

Offense
Pro-style

WR
Tetairoa McMillan
Devin Hyatt
-

WR
Montana Lemonious-Craig
Malachi Riley
-

LT	LG	C	RG	RT
Rhino Tapa’atoutai	Wendell Moe Jr.	Josh Baker	Ryan Stewart	Jonah Savaiinaea
Mike Wooten	Alexander Doost	Grayson Stovall	Leif Magnuson	Matthew Lado
-	-	-	-	-

TE
Keyan Burnett
Sam Olson
Roberto Miranda

WR
Jeremiah Patterson
Raymello Murphy
-

QB
Noah Fifita
Cole Tannenbaum
-

Key reserves
Offense
Defense
Special teams
Out (indefinitely)
Out (season)
Out (suspended)
Out (retired)

RB
Jacory Croskey-Merritt
Quali Conley
Kendrick Reescano
Rayshon Luke

Special teams
PK Tyler Loop
PK Michael Salgado-Medina
P Michael Salgado-Medina
P Jordan Forbes
Lachlan Bruce
KR Jeremiah Patterson
Rayshon Luker
PR Jack Luttrell
Jeremiah Patterson
LS Justin Holloway
Trey Haughton
H Michael Salgado-Medina
Jordan Forbes

True Freshman
Double Position : *
projected Depth Chart Week 1 vs New Mexico

=== Coaching staff additions ===
Name	Position	Old team	Old position
Brent Brennan	Head coach	San Jose State	Head coach
Dino Babers	Offensive coordinator/Quarterbacks coach	Syracuse	Head coach
Josh Oglesby	Offensive line coach	San Jose State	Offensive line coach/Run game coordinator
Matt Adkins	Tight end coach/Passing game coordinator	San Jose State	Tight ends coach
Alonzo Carter	Assistant head coach/Running backs coach	San Jose State	Assistant head coach/Running backs coach/Recruiting coordinator
Danny Gonzales	Linebackers coach/Special Teams coordinator	New Mexico	Head coach
Bobby Wade	Wide receivers coach	Arizona State	Offensive analyst
Duane Akina	Defensive coordinator	Arizona	Analyst

- : to be confirmed

=== Coaching staff departures ===
Name	Position	New team	New position
Jedd Fisch	Head coach	Washington	Head coach
Jimmie Dougherty	Passing game coordinator/Quarterbacks coach	Washington	Passing game coordinator/Quarterbacks coach
Brennan Carroll	Offensive coordinator/offensive line coach	Washington	Offensive coordinator/offensive line coach
Jordan Paopao	Tight end coach	Washington	Tight ends coach
Scottie Graham	Running backs coach	Washington	Running backs coach
Jason Kaufusi	Outside linebackers coach/Defensive line coach/Co-Special Teams coordinator	Washington	Outside linebackers coach/Defensive line coach/Co-Special Teams coordinator
Kevin Cummings	Wide receivers coach	Washington	Wide receivers coach
Johnny Nansen	Defensive coordinator	Texas	Defensive coordinator

=== Team departures ===
Over the course of the off-season, Arizona lost 42 total players. 5 players graduated, 11 declared for the NFL Draft, while the other 26 entered the transfer portal.

2024 Arizona offseason departures
Name	Pos.	Height/Weight	Hometown	Year	Reason
Martell Irby	DB	5'9, 200	San Diego, CA	Senior	Graduated
Kyle Ostendorp	P	6’2, 215	Phoenix, AZ	Redshirt Senior	Graduated
Jeremy Mercier	LB	6’3, 245	Chandler, AZ	Senior	Graduated
Sam Langi	OL	6’5, 320	San Francisco, CA	Senior	Graduated
Seth MacKellar	LS	6’0, 235	San Juan Capistrano, CA	Senior	Graduated

=== Transfers ===
==== Transfers out ====
The Wildcats have lost 26 players via transfer.

Name	Pos.	Height/Weight	Year	Hometown	New school
Jacob Kongaika	DL	6'2, 300	Sophomore	Rowland Heights, CA	Arizona State
Orin Patu	DL	6'4, 245	Senior	Seattle, WA	Bethune–Cookman (FCS)
Jason Harris	DL	6'7, 240	Redshirt Freshman	Gilbert, AZ	Marshall
Isaiah Taylor	DB	5'11, 200	Sophomore	Fort Lauderdale, FL	Miami
Stevie Rocker Jr.	RB	6'0, 215	Redshirt Sophomore	Tucson, AZ	Montana (FCS)
Ammon Allen	LB	6'3, 220	Junior	Gilbert, AZ	Northern Arizona (FCS)
Canyon Moses	DB	5'11, 195	Freshman	Midland, TX	Northern Arizona (FCS)
Charles Yates Jr.	DB	5'11, 200	Junior	Mobile, AL	Old Dominion
Tiaoalii Savea	DL	6'4, 305	Junior	Las Vegas, NV	Texas
Jonah Coleman	RB	5'9, 225	Sophomore	Stockton, CA	Washington
Ephesians Prysock	DB	6'4, 190	Junior	Mission Hills, CA	Washington
Russell Davis II	DL	6'3, 220	Junior	Chandler, AZ	Washington
Audric Harris	WR	6'0, 175	Freshman	Las Vegas, NV	Washington
Anthony Ward	LB	6'1, 195	Redshirt Sophomore	Ontario, CA	Washington
Cruz Rushing	DB	6'0, 194	Junior	Tucson, AZ	Oregon (walk-on)
Isaiah Ward	DL	6'5, 225	Redshirt Sophomore	Ontario, CA	Washington
Daniel Heimuli	LB	6'0, 225	Junior	East Palo Alto, CA	Georgia State
Bill Norton	DL	6′6, 300	Junior	Memphis, TN	Texas
DJ Warnell	DB	6'1, 202	Junior	La Marque, TX	Indiana
Joe Borjon	OL	6'8, 330	Sophomore	La Puente, CA	San Diego State
Kameron Hawkins	LS	5'11, 220	Redshirt Junior	Victorville, CA	Colorado
Kevin Green Jr.	WR	5'11, 170	Redshirt Sophomore	Mission Hills, CA	Washington
Anthony Patt	OL	6'5, 300	Redshirt Junior	San Marcos, CA	Old Dominion
Michael Watkins	IOL	6'2, 300	Senior	Glendale, AZ	Washington
Demond Williams Jr.	QB	5'10, 180	Senior	Chandler, AZ	Washington
Jordan Washington	RB	5'10, 160	Freshman	Long Beach, CA	Washington
Deric English	WR	6'4, 215	Freshman	Scottsdale, AZ	

==== Transfers in ====
The Wildcats have added 27 players via transfer. According to 247 Sports, Arizona had the No. 37 ranked transfer class in the country.

Name	Pos.	Height/Weight	Year	Hometown	Old school	Sources
Chubba Maae	DL	6′2, 347	Junior	Long Beach, CA	UC Davis (FCS)	
Jack Luttrell	S	6′0, 180	Freshman	Gainesville, GA	Tennessee	
Alexander Doost	IOL	6′6, 309	Freshman	Glendale, AZ	Northwestern	
Quali Conley	RB	5′10, 207	Senior	Fresno, CA	San Jose State	
Kevon Darton	DL	5′11, 271	Senior	Fitchburg, MA	Syracuse	
Cyrus Durham	EDGE	6′4, 235	Sophomore	Redwood, CA	College of San Mateo (JC)	
Johno Price	CB	6′2, 175	Sophomore	East Palo Alto, CA	College of San Mateo (JC)	
Tre Smith	EDGE	6′5, 255	Junior	Mesa, AZ	San Jose State	
Ryan Stewart	OL	6′4, 295	Junior	Mokena, IL	San Jose State	
Marquis Groves-Killebrew	CB	6'0, 180	Redshirt Freshman	Kennesaw, GA	Louisville	
Anthony Wilhite	RB	5'11, 185	Freshman	Tucson, AZ	Ottawa (AZ)	--
Justin Holloway	LS	6'3, 206	Senior	Venice, FL	Ohio	
Anthony Garcia	QB	6'1, 192	Freshman	Sacramento, CA	San Jose State	
Sam Olson	TE	6'3, 238	Junior	Visalia, CA	San Jose State	
Jarra Anderson	DL	6'2, 260	Freshman	Katy, TX	Memphis	
James Smith	DB	6'1, 190	Redshirt Sophomore	Los Angeles, CA	San Jose State	
Chase Kennedy	EDGE	6'3, 231	Sophomore	Dallas, TX	Utah	
Michael Wooten	OL	6'4, 310	Redshirt Freshman	Simi Valley, CA	Oregon	
Reymello Murphy	WR	6'0, 185	Sophomore	Fremont, CA	Old Dominion	
Jonah Rodriguez	OL	6'4, 275	Freshman	San Diego, CA	San Diego State	
Marquis Brown	CB	6′4, 200	Sophomore	Hillsboro, OR	Golden West College (JC)	
Lance Keneley	LB	6′4, 250	Senior	Mission Viejo, CA	Stanford	
Demetrius Freeney	CB	6′0, 190	Junior	San Leandro, CA	Miami	
Jeremiah Patterson	WR	5′9, 175	Sophomore	Union City, CA	College of San Mateo (JC)	
Kedrick Resscano	RB	6'0, 210	Freshman	New Caney, TX	Ole Miss	
Jacory Croskey-Merritt	RB	5′11, 205	Senior	Montgomery, AL	New Mexico	
Adam Damante	QB	6'2, 180	Freshman	Gilbert, AZ	Northern Arizona (FCS)	
Shannco Matautia	OL	6'2, 346	Sophomore	Anaheim, CA	New Mexico	
Stanley Ta’ufo’ou	DL	6′2, 275	Redshirt Senior	Simi Valley, CA	USC	
Owen Goss	DB	6′0, 205	Senior	Hinsdale, IL	Colgate (FCS)	
Jared Small	LB	6'2, 220	Senior	Baton Rouge, LA	Tulane	
Joey Capra	OL	6'4, 301	Redshirt Senior	Auburn, CA	Nevada	

Note: Players with a dash in the new school column didn't land on a new team for the 2024 season.

=== NFL draft ===
==== Entered NFL draft ====
Player	Position	Round	Pick	Drafted by
Jordan Morgan	OL	1	25	Green Bay Packers
Jacob Cowing	WR	4	135	San Francisco 49ers
Tanner McLachlan	TE	6	194	Cincinnati Bengals
Michael Wiley	RB	UDFA		Washington Commanders
Taylor Upshaw	LB	UDFA		Carolina Panthers
Tyler Manoa	DL	UDFA		Minnesota Vikings
DJ Williams	RB	UDFA		Tampa Bay Buccaneers

=== CFL draft ===
==== CFL global draft ====
The following player have headed for the 2024 CFL global Draft : TE Tanner McLahlan.

Player	Position	Round	Pick	Drafted by
Tanner McLachlan	DL	6	51	Calgary Stampeders

=== Returning starters ===
Offense
Player	Position	Class	Games started
Noah Fifita	R-So.	Quarterback	
Rayshon Luke	Junior	Running back	
Tetairoa McMillan	Junior	Wide receiver	
Keyan Burnett	Junior	Tight end	
Jonah Savaiinaea	Junior	Offensive lineman	

Defense
Player	Class	Position	Games started
Isaiah Johnson	R-So.	Defensive lineman	
Jacob Manu	Junior	Linebacker	
Gunner Maldonado	Senior	Defensive back	

Special teams
Player	Class	Position	Games started
Tyler Loop	Senior	Placekicker	
Jordan Forbes	R-So.	Punter	

=== Recruiting class ===
Arizona signed 8 players in the 2024 recruiting cycle. The Wildcats' was ranked fifty-six by 247Sports and ranked forty-six by Rivals.com rankings. No Arizona signees were ranked in the ESPN 300 top prospect list. Arizona also signed 4 JuCo, 6 walk-ons during national signing period.

College recruiting
Name	Hometown	School	Height	Weight	Commit date
Dylan Tapley; Tight end	Scottsdale, AZ	Desert Mountain High School	6 ft 0 in (1.83 m)	165 lb (75 kg)	Nov 11, 2023
Dylan Tapley; Tight end	Recruit ratings: Rivals: 247Sports: On3: ESPN: (79)				
Turran Williams; Safety	Pasadena, CA	John Muir High School	6 ft 4 in (1.93 m)	210 lb (95 kg)	Jul 3, 2023
Turran Williams; Safety	Recruit ratings: Rivals: 247Sports: On3: ESPN: (78)				
Edukwa Okundaye; Defensive end	Katy, TX	Obra D. Tompkins High School	6 ft 3 in (1.91 m)	220 lb (100 kg)	Jun 13, 2023
Edukwa Okundaye; Defensive end	Recruit ratings: Rivals: 247Sports: On3: ESPN: (77)				
Brandon Phelps; Wide receiver	Gilbert, AZ	American Leadership Academy	6 ft 3 in (1.91 m)	200 lb (91 kg)	Dec 22, 2022
Brandon Phelps; Wide receiver	Recruit ratings: Rivals: 247Sports: On3: ESPN: (77)				
Stacy Bey; Inside linebacker	Fontana, CA	Rancho Cucamonga High School	6 ft 1 in (1.85 m)	205 lb (93 kg)	Oct 8, 2023
Stacy Bey; Inside linebacker	Recruit ratings: Rivals: 247Sports: On3: ESPN: (75)				
Matthew Lado; Offensive tackle	Glendale, AZ	Apollo High School	6 ft 5 in (1.96 m)	260 lb (120 kg)	Jun 19, 2023
Matthew Lado; Offensive tackle	Recruit ratings: Rivals: 247Sports: On3: ESPN: (75)				
Michael Salgado-Medina; Kicker	Mission Viejo, CA	Mission Viejo High School	6 ft 2 in (1.88 m)	190 lb (86 kg)	Jun 18, 2023
Michael Salgado-Medina; Kicker	Recruit ratings: Rivals: 247Sports: On3: ESPN: (74)				
Jabari Mann; Athlete	San Mateo, CA	Junipero Serra High School	6 ft 0 in (1.83 m)	200 lb (91 kg)	Feb 21, 2024
Jabari Mann; Athlete	Recruit ratings: Rivals: 247Sports: On3: ESPN: (74)				
Overall recruit ranking:
‡ Refers to 40-yard dash; Note: In many cases, Scout, Rivals, 247Sports, On3, and ESPN may conflict in their listings of height, weight and 40 time.; In these cases, the average was taken. ESPN grades are on a 100-point scale.; Sources: "Arizona Football Commitment List". Rivals.; "2024 Player Commitments – Arizona". ESPN.; "2024 Team Ranking". Rivals.com.; "Arizona 2024 Football Commitments". 247Sports.

*= 247Sports Composite rating; ratings are out of 1.00. (five stars= 1.00–.98, four stars= .97–.90, three stars= .80–.89)
†= Despite being rated as a four and five star recruit by ESPN, On3.com, Rivals.com and 247Sports.com, Williams and Whittington received a four star 247Sports Composite rating.
Δ= Demond Williams Jr. and Jordan Washington left the Arizona program following signing but prior to the 2024 season.

2024 overall class rankings

Website	National rank	Conference rank	5 star recruits	4 star recruits	3 star recruits
ESPN	--	--	--	2	17
On3 Recruits	50	9	--	2	17
Rivals	46	5	--	2	15
247 Sports	56	11	--	2	21

Walks-ons

Name	Pos.	Height/Weight	Hometown	High school
Jordan McCord	WR	5’11, 170	Soquel, CA	Soquel
Joseph Washington	DB	5’10, 175	Phoenix, AZ	Mountain Pointe
Kayden Luke	RB/LB	5’11, 220	Tucson, AZ	Canyon del Oro
Mason Bray	QB	6’0, 175	Scottsdale, AZ	Saguaro
Quinn Olson	DB	6’3, 195	Sioux City, IA	Bishop Heelan Catholic
Taniela Taliauli	DB	6’0, 190	Honolulu, HI	Iolani

== Rankings ==
Ranking movements Legend: ██ Increase in ranking ██ Decrease in ranking — = Not ranked RV = Received votes
	Week																
Poll	Pre	1	2	3	4	5	6	7	8	9	10	11	12	13	14	15	Final
AP	21	20	20	RV	RV	RV	—	—	—	—	—	—	—	—	—	—	—
Coaches	21	18	18	RV	RV	RV	RV	—	—	—	—	—	—	—	—	—	—
CFP	Not released										—	—	—	—	—	—	Not released

== Statistics ==
=== Scoring ===
==== Arizona vs. non-conference opponents ====
	1	2	3	4	Total
Arizona	24	16	28	22	90
Opponents	21	27	21	11	80

==== Arizona vs. Big 12 opponents ====
	1	2	3	4	OT	Total
Arizona	20	14	28	35	0	97
Big 12 opponents	31	49	23	41	0	144

==== Arizona vs. all opponents ====
	1	2	3	4	OT	Total
Arizona	44	30	56	57	0	187
Opponents	52	76	44	52	0	224

== Awards and honors ==
Big 12 Weekly Honors
Date	Player	Class	Position	Award	Ref.
September 1	Tetairoa McMillan	Jr.	WR	Big 12 Offensive Player of the Week	
September 30	Tacario Davis	Jr.	DB	Big 12 Defensive Player of the Week	

National Weekly Honors
Date	Player	Class	Position	Award
September 1	Tetairoa McMillan	Jr.	WR	Reese's Senior Bowl Co-Offensive Player of the Week
September 3	Tetairoa McMillan	Jr.	WR	AP National Player of the Week
September 4	Tetairoa McMillan	Jr.	WR	Walter Camp National Player of the Week

=== All-Big 12 ===
All-Big 12
Player	Position	1st/2nd team
HM = Honorable mention. Source:
