= Duane Akina =

American football player and coach (born 1956)

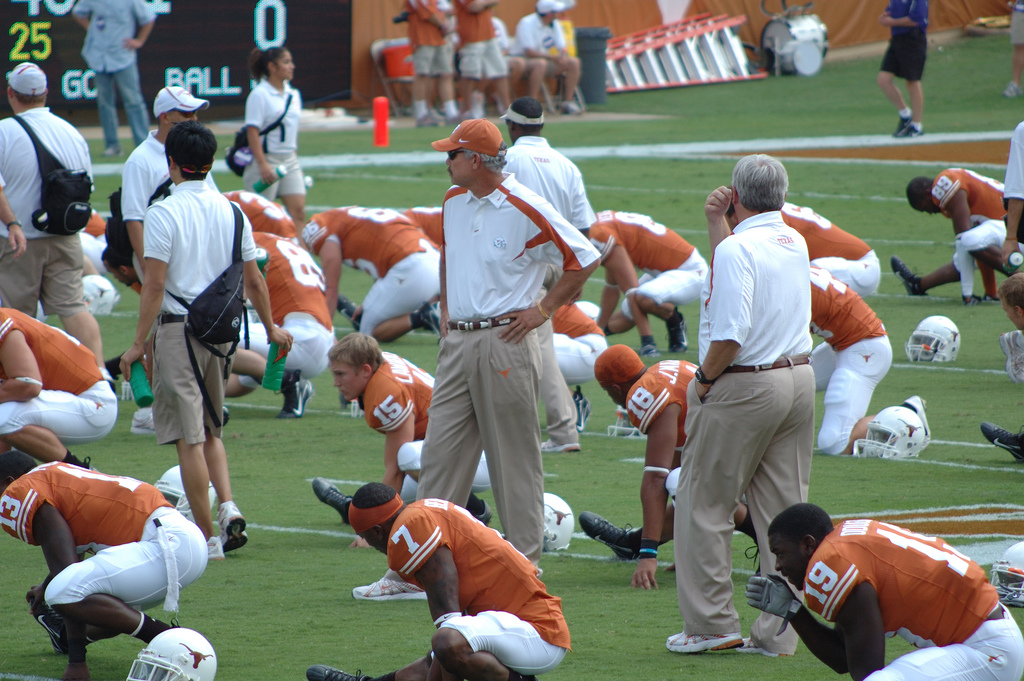

Current position
- Title: Nickels coach / senior analyst
- Team: Kansas

Biographical details
- Born: October 22, 1956 (age 70); Honolulu, Hawaii, U.S.

Playing career
- 1976–1979: Washington
- Position: Quarterback

Coaching career (HC unless noted)
- 1979–1980: Washington (GA)
- 1981–1982: Hawaii (DB)
- 1983: Hawaii (OLB)
- 1984–1985: Hawaii (DB)
- 1986: Calgary Stampeders (DB)
- 1987–1988: Arizona (DB)
- 1989-1991: Arizona (AHC/DB)
- 1992–1995: Arizona (OC)
- 1996–2000: Arizona (DB)
- 2001–2002: Texas (DB)
- 2003–2004: Texas (AHC/DB)
- 2005–2007: Texas (co-DC/DB)
- 2008–2010: Texas (AC/DB)
- 2011–2013: Texas (AHC/DB)
- 2014–2022: Stanford (DB)
- 2023: Arizona (analyst)
- 2024: Arizona (DC)
- 2025: Texas (DPGC)
- 2026: Kansas (Nickels)

Duane Akina (born October 22, 1956) is an American football coach for the Kansas Jayhawks. He was previously the defensive pass game coordinator for the Texas Longhorns.

In 28 years of coaching football, Akina has coached three Thorpe Award winners in Darryll Lewis (1990), Michael Huff (2005), and Aaron Ross (2006), as well as five finalists for the award, among them Chris McAlister. Twenty of his defensive backs have also gone on to play in the NFL.

He was an assistant coach to Dick Tomey at the University of Arizona for 14 years, serving as defensive backs coach and offensive coordinator. He was named Arizona defensive coordinator in 2000, but decided to leave for Texas to become the team's defensive back coach.

Akina was promoted to co-defensive coordinator and retained his duties as defensive backs coach for the Longhorns from 2005 to 2007. In the 2007 season, he shared the defensive coordinator position with Larry Mac Duff, but called the defensive plays. After a frustrating season, in which the Longhorns defense allowed a school-record 4,498 total yards, Akina could have faced dismissal following the 2007 Holiday Bowl. However, not Akina, but Larry Mac Duff resigned. Akina was nonetheless demoted to secondary coach after Will Muschamp was hired as the new defensive coordinator.

Following June Jones' resignation at Hawaiʻi, Akina was considered to be one of the candidates for his replacement.

In January 2011, it was announced that Akina would be leaving the Longhorns to be the defensive backs coach at the University of Arizona. One month later, his replacement at Texas, Jerry Gray, left the Longhorns to become the defensive coordinator of the Tennessee Titans. A few days later, Akina announced that he would be returning to Texas to resume his defensive backs position with the Longhorns due to family considerations. On January 10, 2014, it was reported that Akina would not return for the Longhorns in 2014 after new head coach Charlie Strong decided not to keep him on his staff.

In March 2014, Akina was hired as the defensive backs coach for Stanford.

On December 18, 2025, Texas fired Akina, along with defensive coordinator Pete Kwiatkowski.
