= Jonah Savaiinaea =

American football player (born 2004)

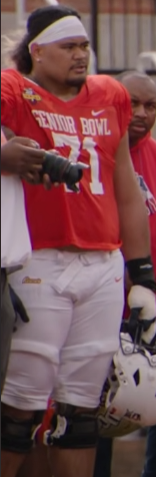
- Savaiinaea at the 2025 Senior Bowl

No. 71 – Miami Dolphins
- Position: Offensive guard
- Roster status: Active

Personal information
- Born: January 13, 2004 (age 22); Tafuna, American Samoa
- Listed height: 6 ft 5 in (1.96 m)
- Listed weight: 325 lb (147 kg)

Career information
- High school: Saint Louis (Honolulu, Hawaii, U.S.)
- College: Arizona (2022–2024)
- NFL draft: 2025: 2nd round, 37th overall pick

Career history
- Miami Dolphins (2025–present)

Career NFL statistics as of 2025
- Games played: 17
- Games started: 17
- Stats at Pro Football Reference

Jonah M. Savaiinaea (Savuh-ee-NYE-uh; born January 13, 2004) is an American professional football guard for the Miami Dolphins of the National Football League (NFL). He played college football for the Arizona Wildcats and was selected by the Dolphins in the second round of the 2025 NFL draft.

== Early life ==
Savaiinaea was born in Tafuna, American Samoa, and attended the Saint Louis School in Honolulu, Hawaii. He was rated as a three-star recruit and committed to play college football for the Arizona Wildcats while also having numerous Power 4 offers.

== College career ==
As a freshman in 2022, Savaiinaea started all 12 games at right guard for the Wildcats. For his performance on the season, he was named to the FWAA freshman all-American team and was an honorable mention all-Pac-12 Conference selection. Heading into the 2023 season, Savaiinaea was converted from right guard to right tackle. During the season though, he played both right guard and tackle. Savaiinaea started all 13 games for Arizona in 2023, once again receiving all-Pac-12 honorable mention all-Pac-12.

== Professional career ==
Pre-draft measurables
Height	Weight	Arm length	Hand span	Wingspan	40-yard dash	10-yard split	20-yard split	20-yard shuttle	Vertical jump	Broad jump	Bench press
6 ft 4 1/8 in (1.93 m)	324 lb (147 kg)	33 7/8 in (0.86 m)	10 1/4 in (0.26 m)	6 ft 10 1/4 in (2.09 m)	4.95 s	1.72 s	2.87 s	4.66 s	29.0 in (0.74 m)	8 ft 10 in (2.69 m)	26 reps
All values from NFL Combine/Pro Day

Savaiinaea was selected by the Miami Dolphins in the second round with the 37th overall pick in the 2025 NFL draft.
